= Koji Doi =

Japanese professional wrestler

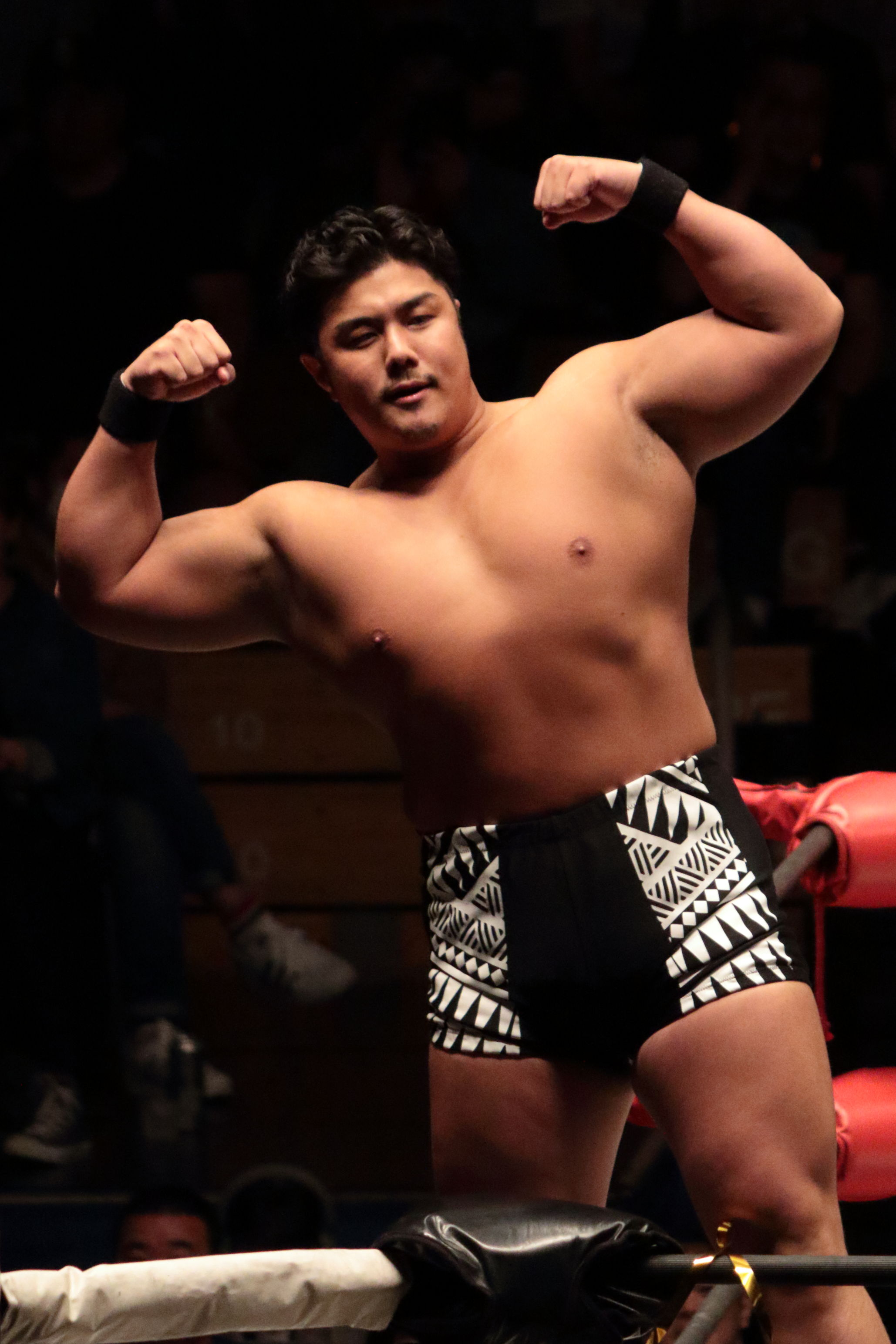
- Doi in May 2019

Personal information
- Born: February 11, 1990 (age 36) Kawasaki, Japan

Professional wrestling career
- Ring name: Koji Doi
- Billed height: 178 cm (5 ft 10 in)
- Billed weight: 110 kg (243 lb)
- Trained by: Animal Hamaguchi; Shuji Kondo; Tajiri
- Debut: 2011

Koji Doi (土肥 孝司, Doi Kōji; ring name: 土肥 こうじ) (born February 11, 1990) is a Japanese professional wrestler currently working as a freelancer and is best known for his tenure with the Japanese promotions Wrestle-1 and All Japan Pro Wrestling.

== Professional wrestling career ==
=== Independent circuit (2011–present) ===
Doi has made freelance work ever since he started his career, competing in various promotions from the Japanese independent scene. At Endless Survivor 2014, an event promoted by Big Japan Pro Wrestling on May 5, he teamed up with Masaya Takahashi to defeat Hideyoshi Kamitani and Takayuki Ueki. At Zero1 Yamanashi Pro Wrestling Festival Vol. 5 on November 13, 2022, he teamed up with Shoki Kitamura to defeat Minorita and Tsugutaka Sato.

=== Wrestle-1 (2014–2020) ===
Doi is probably best known for his time in now defunct promotion Wrestle-1. He made his debut in the company at W-1 WRESTLE-1 Tour 2014 After The IMPACT on July 12, where he teamed up with Yusuke Kodama in a losing effort against Daiki Inaba and Yasufumi Nakanoue. During his time in the company, he chased for various titles promoted by it. Doi is a former five-time Wrestle-1 Tag Team Champion, titles which he held with three different partners, a four-time UWA World Trios Champion and a former Wrestle-1 Result Champion. In separate occasions, he even challenged for titles owned by other promotions but held by Wrestle-1 personnel. At W-1 WRESTLE-1 Tour 2020 Sunrise on January 12, he unsuccessfully challenged Shigehiro Irie for the OWE Openweight Championship. On April 1, 2020, at W-1 WRESTLE-1 Tour 2020 Trans Magic, Wrestle-1 has held its last event before closure. Doi teamed up with Daiki Inaba and Enfants Terribles (Kumaarashi and Shotaro Ashino) in a losing effort against Kaz Hayashi, Keiji Muto, Masayuki Kono and Shuji Kondo as a result of an eight-man tag team match.

He is known for competing in various of the promotion's signature events. In the Wrestle-1 Grand Prix, which was the biggest yearly event promoted by the company, he made his first appearance at the 2015 edition which was also the first ever held, where he defeated Masayuki Kono in the first rounds but fell short to Tajiri in the second ones. At the 2016 edition he fell short to Akira in the first rounds. At the 2017 edition, he fell short to Jiro Kuroshio in the first rounds. At the 2018 edition, he fell short to Shuji Kondo in the first rounds. At the 2019 and final edition of the tournament, he defeated Manabu Soya in the first rounds and fell short to Shotaro Ashino in the second ones.

As for the Wrestle-1 Tag League, Doi made his first appearance at the 2014 edition where he teamed up with Yusuke Kodama as "Novus", placing themselves in the block B where they scored only one point after competing against the teams of Akatenrou (Kai and Ryota Hama), New Wild Order (Akira and Manabu Soya), Too Sharp (Minoru Tanaka and Seiki Yoshioka), and Seiya to Hiroshi (Hiroshi Yamato and Seiya Sanada). At the 2017 edition, he teamed up with Kumagoro as DoiKuma and won the entire tournament. They finished the A Block on the second spot with three points after going against the teams of New Era (Daiki Inaba and Jiro Kuroshio), Tokyo Gurentai (Mazada and Nosawa Rongai), and Team 246 Presidents (Kaz Hayashi and Shuji Kondo), and then qualified for the semifinals where they defeated Beast Tyrant (Yuji Hino and Jake Omen), and furtherly Inaba and Kuroshio in the finals. Doi also succeeded in winning the 2018 edition where he teamed up with Shuji Kondo and topped the block B with four points after taking on Takanori Ito and Ryuji Hijikata, Masayuki Kono and Yukio Naya, and Ganseki Tanaka and Tsugutaka Sato, and then moved to the finals where they outmatched Manabu Soya and Daiki Inaba. At the 2019 and last edition, he teamed up with Inaba and scored a total of three points in the block B after competing against Kumaarashi and René Duprée, Seiki Yoshioka and El Lindaman, and Shuji Kondo and Manabu Soya.

=== All Japan Pro Wrestling (2014–2022) ===
Doi is also known for his tenure with All Japan Pro Wrestling. He made his debut in the company at AJPW Dynamite Series 2014 on June 15, where he teamed up with Osamu Nishimura to defeat Masato Shibata and Yutaka Yoshie. During his time with the promotion, he chased for various titles and took part of the "Total Eclipse" stable led by Jake Lee and formed a sub-tag team with his old Wrestle-1 tag team partner Kumaarashi. At AJPW Raising An Army Memorial Series on October 2, 2022, he and Arashi unsuccessfully challenged Gungnir Of Anarchy (Ryuki Honda and Shotaro Ashino) for the World Tag Team Championship.

Doi competed in the promotion's biggest yearly series of events, the "AJPW New Year Wars". On the first night of the 2021 edition from January 2, he competed twice, first in a battle royal won by The Bodyguard and also involving Francesco Akira, Atsuki Aoyagi, Rising Hayato, Ryuji Hijikata, Yoshitatsu, Takayuki Ueki and others, and secondly by teaming up with Kumaarashi as a sub-group of the "Enfants Terribles" in a losing effort against Evolution (Dan Tamura and Hikaru Sato). On the second night, he and Arashi unsuccessfully challenged Purple Haze (Izanagi and Zeus) for the All Asia Tag Team Championship. On the second night of the 2022 edition from January 3, he unsuccessfully challenged Shigehiro Irie for the Gaora TV Championship.

He competed in various of the promotion's signature events such as the Champion Carnival in which he made his first appearance at the 2021 edition where he scored a total of two points after competing against Kento Miyahara, Yuma Aoyagi, Kohei Sato, Zeus, Shuji Ishikawa, Suwama, Shotaro Ashino and Shinjiro Otani. In the Ōdō Tournament, he made his first appearance at the 2021 edition where he fell short to Koji Iwamoto in the first rounds.

In the Real World Tag League, he made his first appearance at the 2016 edition where he teamed up with Kumagoro and scored a total of two points in the block B after competing against the teams of Takao Omori and Manabu Soya, Jun Akiyama and Kendo Kashin, Bodyguard and Zeus, Yuma Aoyagi and Naoya Nomura, and Hikaru Sato and Super Tiger. After five years of hiatus, he returned at the 2021 edition where he again teamed up with Kumagoro (this time going under the name of Kumaarashi), won the block D with a total of four points after going against Koji Iwamoto and Ryuki Honda, Zeus and Shigehiro Irie, and Takao Omori and Isami Kodaka, advanced to the semifinals where they outmatched Suwama and Shotaro Ashino but fell short to Kento Miyahara and Yuma Aoyagi in the finals. At the 2022 edition, they teamed up again to score a total of six points in the only block of the tournament after going against Kento Miyahara and Takuya Nomura, Shuji Ishikawa and Cyrus, Jake Lee and Yuma Aoyagi, Suwama and Kono, Jun Saito and Rei Saito, Yuji Nagata and Yuma Anzai, and Shotaro Ashino and Ryuki Honda.

=== Colega Pro Wrestling (2021–2022) ===
Doi started making freelancer appearances for Colega Pro Wrestling since 2021. At CPW Overheat on August 13, 2022, he defeated Andy Wu to win the King of Colega Championship.

== Championships and accomplishments ==
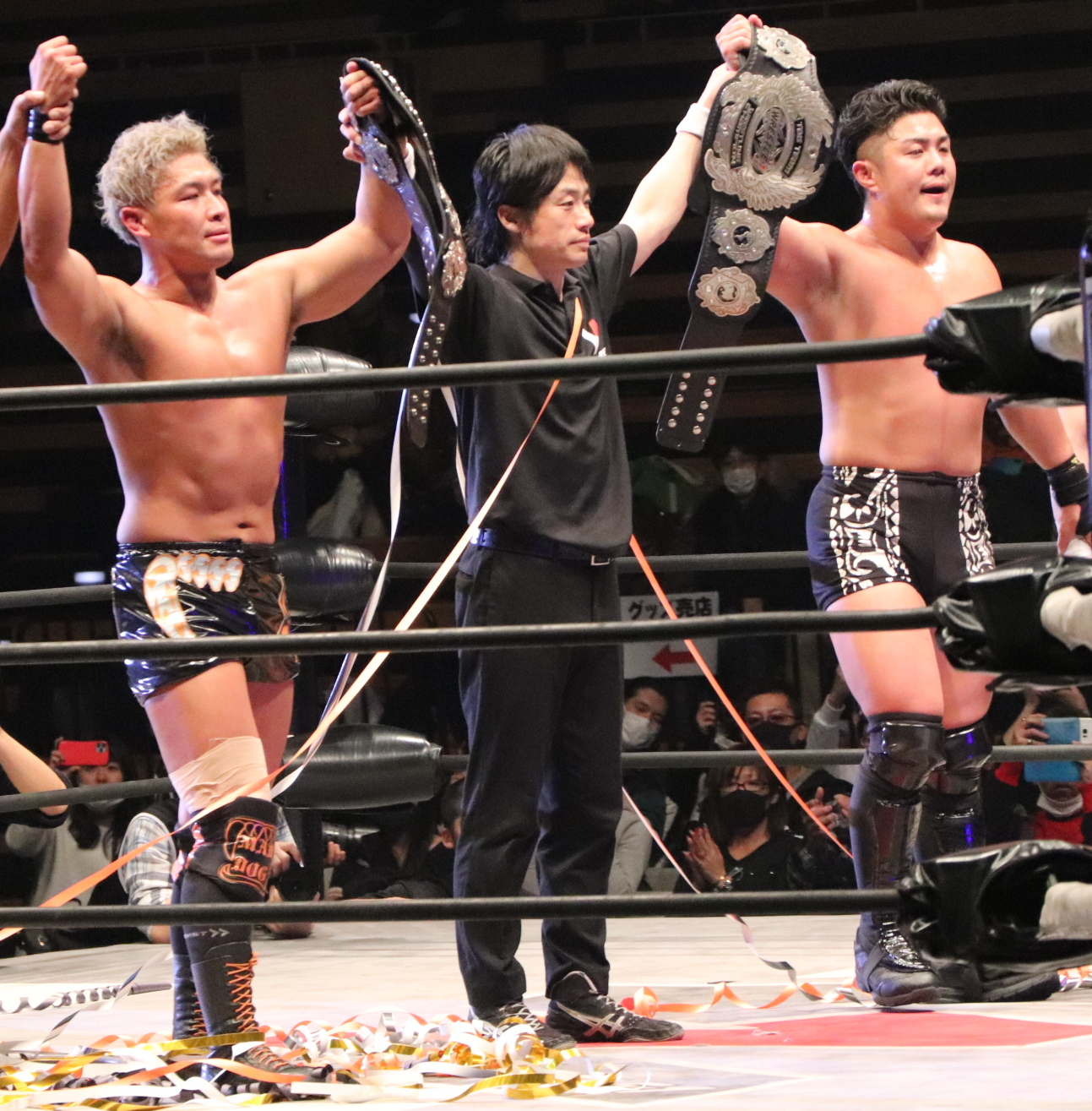
Koji Doi (right) and Daiki Inaba (left) after winning the Wrestle-1 Tag Team Championship at Wrestle Wars in March 2020

- Colega Pro Wrestling
  - King of Colega Championship (1 time, final)
- Kyushu Pro-Wrestling
  - Kyushu Pro-Wrestling Tag Team Championship (1 time) – with Kumaarashi
- Niigata Pro Wrestling
  - Niigata Heavyweight Championship (1 time, current)
  - Niigata Openweight Championship (1 time)
  - Niigata Tag Team Championship (1 time) – with Kumaarashi
- Pro Wrestling Illustrated
  - Ranked No. 306 of the top 500 singles wrestlers in the PWI 500 in 2018
- Wrestle-1
  - Wrestle-1 Result Championship (1 time)
  - Wrestle-1 Tag Team Championship (5 times, final) – with Kumagoro (3), Shuji Kondo (1) and Daiki Inaba (1)
  - UWA World Trios Championship (4 times) – with Kazma Sakamoto and Nosawa Rongai (1), Andy Wu and Kumagoro (1), Jiro Kuroshio and Kumagoro (1), Kumagoro and Takanori Ito (1)
  - Wrestle-1 Tag League (2017, 2018) – with Kumagoro and Shuji Kondo
