= Wrestle-1 Tag League =

The Wrestle-1 Tag League was a professional wrestling round-robin tag team tournament held by Wrestle-1. It was created in 2014. Originally known as the Tag League Greatest in 2014. The tournament was given its current name in June 2017. The inaugural tournament, was held to determine the first Wrestle-1 Tag Team Champions, which was won by Kaz Hayashi and Shuji Kondo who also became the longest reigning Wrestle-1 Tag Team Champions. The winners of the tournament can choose a title shot of their choosing.

The Wrestle-1 Tag League was held under a round-robin system, with two points for a win, one for a draw and none for a loss. The teams finishing a top of the points standings in the two blocks advanced to the knockout stage, where the winner was determined in a head-to-head match. Matches in the Wrestle-1 Tag League had a 30-minute time limit, which is the same as matches for Wrestle-1 Tag Team Championship.

== List of winners ==
| Tournament | Year | Winners (total won as an individual) | Total won as a team | Reference |
|---|---|---|---|---|
| Tag League Greatest | 2014 | Kaz Hayashi and Shuji Kondo | 1 | |
| Wrestle-1 Tag League | 2017 | Koji Doi and Kumagoro | 1 | |
| Wrestle-1 Tag League | 2018 | Shuji Kondo (2) and Koji Doi (2) | 1 | |
| Wrestle-1 Tag League | 2019 | T-Hawk and Shigehiro Irie | 1 | |

== 2014 ==
The 2014 Tag League Greatest featured two blocks containing five participants each and took place between November 15 and 30, 2014. The winners of the tournament would become the inaugural Wrestle-1 Tag Team Champions. The two blocks containing the ten participating teams were revealed on November 3. The teams were later given official team names on November 14. Held under a points system, with two points for a win, one for a draw and none for a loss. The top two teams from each block would advance to the knockout stage. Matches in the tournament had a 30-minute time limit, which is the same as matches for Wrestle-1. On November 27, Seiki Yoshioka pulled out of the tournament with a knee injury, forcing his team to forfeit their final match in the tournament. On November 30, Team 246 (Kaz Hayashi and Shuji Kondo) defeated the new Wild order (Akira and Manabu Soya) in the finals to win the tournament and become the inaugural Wrestle-1 Tag Team Champions.

Final standings
| Block A | | Block B | |
| Masayuki Kono and Tajiri (Desperado) | 8 | Kai and Ryota Hama (Akatenrou) | 6 |
| Kaz Hayashi and Shuji Kondo (Team 246) | 6 | Akira and Manabu Soya (New Wild Order) | 5 |
| Jiro Kuroshio and Masakatsu Funaki (Ikeman Samurai) | 4 | Minoru Tanaka and Seiki Yoshioka (Too Sharp) | 4 |
| Taiyo Kea and Yasufumi Nakanoue (Sunrise) | 2 | Hiroshi Yamato and Seiya Sanada (Seiya to Hiroshi) | 4 |
| Nosawa Rongai and Mazada (Tokyo Gurentai) | 0 | Koji Doi and Yusuke Kodama (Novus) | 1 |

Semifinals
1 | Kono & Tajiri | Pin
3 | Akira & Soya | 9:15
2 | Kai & Hama | Pin
4 | Hayashi & Kondo | 11:37

Finals
1 | Akira & Soya | Pin
2 | Hayashi & Kondo | 26:05

== 2017 ==
On June 14, Wrestle-1 announced the creation of the Wrestle-1 Tag League in the fall. On July 31, Wrestle-1 president Kaz Hayashi announced that the Wrestle-1 Tag League would be on September 24 until October 11, covering five shows. All participants and blocks were announced on September 18.

Final standings
| Block A | | Block B | |
| Daiki Inaba and Jiro Kuroshio (New Era) | 5 | Yuji Hino and Jake Omen (Beast Tyrant) | 6 |
| Koji Doi and Kumagoro (DoiKuma) | 3 | Masayuki Kono and Takanori Ito (Team Japan) | 4 |
| Mazada and Nosawa Rongai (Tokyo Gurentai) | 2 | Shotaro Ashino and Yusuke Kodama (Enfants Terrible) | 2 |
| Kaz Hayashi and Shuji Kondo (Team 246 Presidents) | 2 | Manabu Soya and Ganseki Tanaka (Get Wild&Rock) | 0 |

Semifinals
1 | Inaba & Kuroshio | Pin
3 | Kono & Ito | 11:56
2 | Hino & Omen | Pin
4 | Doi & Kumagoro | 9:44

Finals
1 | Inaba & Kuroshio | Pin
2 | Doi & Kumagoro | 34:02

== 2018 ==
The 2018 Wrestle-1 Tag League took place between September 18 and October 24.

Final standings
| Block A | | Block B | |
| Manabu Soya and Daiki Inaba | 6 | Shuji Kondo and Koji Doi | 4 |
| Kaz Hayashi and Pegaso Iluminar | 4 | Takanori Ito and Ryuji Hijikata | 2 |
| Andy Wu and El Hijo del Pantera | 2 | Masayuki Kono and Yukio Naya | 2 |
| Shotaro Ashino and Kumaarashi | 0 | Ganseki Tanaka and Tsugutaka Sato | 0 |

| Finals |
| 1 | Soya & Inaba | Pin |
| 2 | Kondo & Doi | 21:37 |

== 2019 ==
The 2019 Wrestle-1 Tag League ran from October 23 to November 27.

Final standings
| Block A | | Block B | |
| T-Hawk and Shigehiro Irie | 6 | Kumaarashi and René Duprée | 6 |
| Shotaro Ashino and Yusuke Kodama | 4 | Daiki Inaba and Koji Doi | 3 |
| Masayuki Kono and Alejandro | 2 | Seiki Yoshioka and El Lindaman | 3 |
| Jun Tonsho and Pegaso Iluminar | 0 | Shuji Kondo and Manabu Soya | 0 |

| Finals |
| A1 | T-Hawk and Irie | Pin |
| B1 | Arashi and Duprée | 13:37 |

== See also ==
- World Tag League
- World's Strongest Tag Determination League
- Global Tag League
