= Kumaarashi =

Japanese professional wrestler

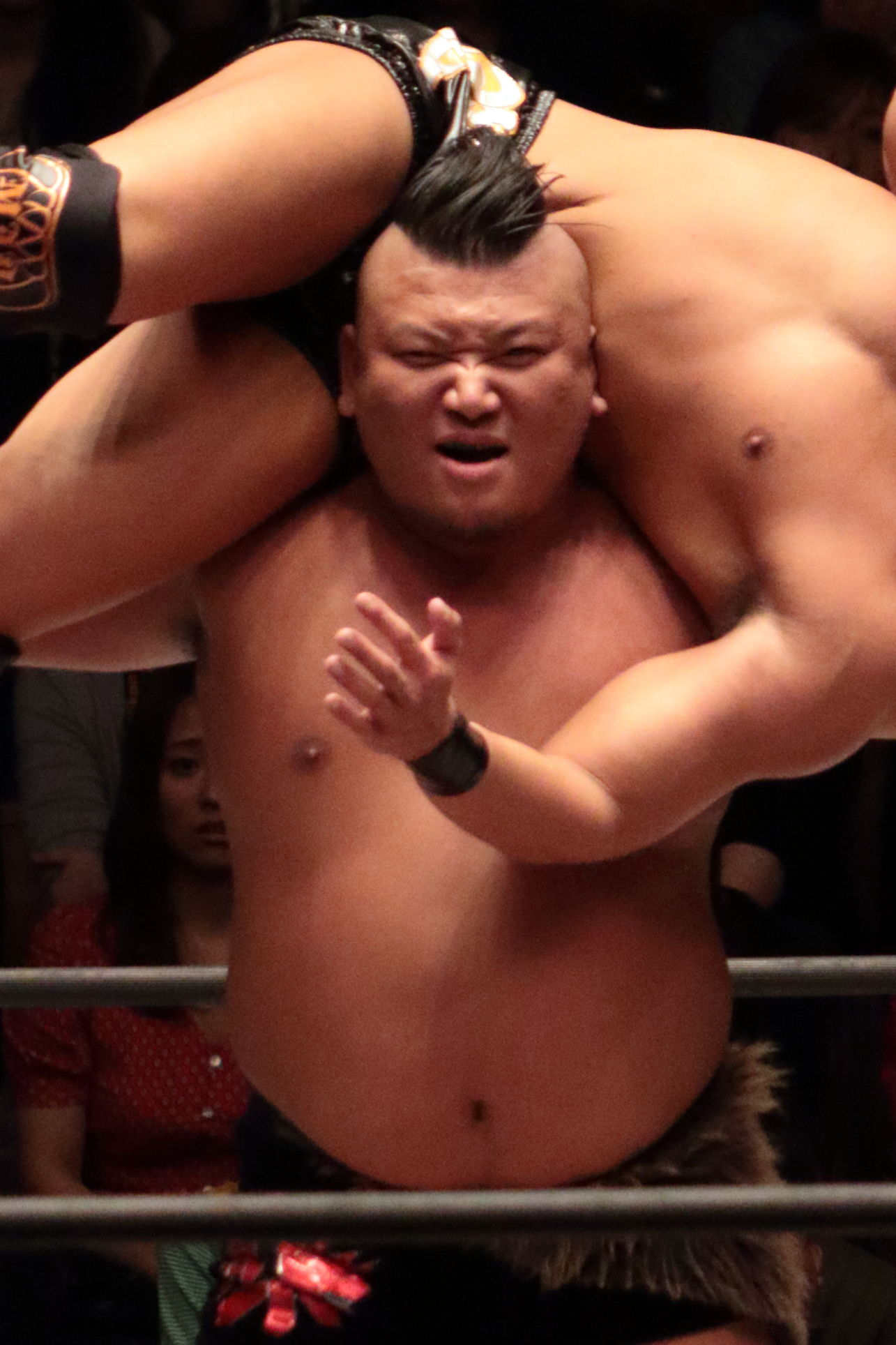
- Kumaarashi in May 2019

Personal information
- Born: December 1, 1991 (age 34) Saitama, Japan

Professional wrestling career
- Ring names: Kumagoro; Kumaarashi
- Billed height: 1.78 m (5 ft 10 in)
- Billed weight: 105 kg (231 lb)
- Trained by: Animal Hamaguchi; Keiji Muto
- Debut: 2015

Masaya Suzuki (鈴木 優也, Suzuki Masaya; born December 1, 1991) better known by his ring names Kumaarashi (羆嵐) and formerly Kumagoro (熊ゴロー, Kumagorō), is a Japanese professional wrestler currently working as a freelancer and is best known for his tenure with the Japanese promotions Wrestle-1 and Active Advance Pro Wrestling.

== Professional wrestling career ==
=== Independent circuit (2015–present) ===
Suzuki has done freelance work ever since he started his career, competing in various promotions from the Japanese independent scene. At 2AW Grand Slam In TKP Garden City Chiba, an event promoted by Active Advance Pro Wrestling on July 31, 2022, he unsuccessfully challenged Kengo Mashimo for the 2AW Openweight Championship. At Tenryu Project Wrestle And Romance Vol. 10, an event promoted by Tenryu Project on February 16, 2023, he teamed up with Masayuki Kono and Yusuke Kodama to defeat Kohei Sato, Mizuki Watase, and Rey Paloma in a six-man tag team match.

=== All Japan Pro Wrestling (2016–2022) ===
Suzuki is also known for his tenure with All Japan Pro Wrestling. He made his debut in the company on the first night of the AJPW Raising an Army Memorial Series 2016 on October 9, where he teamed up with Koji Doi to defeat Nextream (Naoya Nomura and Yuma Aoyagi). During his time with the promotion, he chased for various titles and took part of the "Total Eclipse" stable led by Jake Lee and formed a sub-tag team with his old Wrestle-1 tag team partner Koji Doi. At AJPW Raising An Army Memorial Series on October 2, 2022, he and Doi unsuccessfully challenged Gungnir Of Anarchy (Ryuki Honda and Shotaro Ashino) for the World Tag Team Championship.

Suzuki competed in the promotion's biggest yearly series of events, the "AJPW New Year Wars". On the first night of the 2021 edition from January 2, he teamed up with Koji Doi as a sub-group of the "Enfants Terribles" in a losing effort against Evolution (Dan Tamura and Hikaru Sato). On the second night, he and Doi unsuccessfully challenged Purple Haze (Izanagi and Zeus) for the All Asia Tag Team Championship. On the second night of the 2022 edition from January 3, he teamed up with his "Total Eclipse" stablemates Koji Doi and Ryuki Honda in a losing effort against Abdullah Kobayashi, Daisuke Sekimoto and Ryuji Ito.

He competed in various of the promotion's signature events such as the Champion Carnival in which he made his first appearance at the 2020 edition where he scored a total of two points in block A after competing against Zeus, Jake Lee, Jiro Kuroshio, and Suwama. At the 2022 edition, he placed himself in the block B where he scored a total of two points after competing against Yuma Aoyagi, Kento Miyahara, Takuya Nomura, Suwama and Yoshitatsu. In the Ōdō Tournament, he made his first appearance at the 2021 edition where he fell short to Shigehiro Irie in the first rounds.

In the Real World Tag League, he made his first appearance at the 2016 edition where he teamed up with Koji Doi and scored a total of two points in the block B after competing against the teams of Takao Omori and Manabu Soya, Jun Akiyama and Kendo Kashin, Bodyguard and Zeus, Yuma Aoyagi and Naoya Nomura, and Hikaru Sato and Super Tiger. After five years of hiatus, he returned at the 2021 edition where he again teamed up with Doi, won the block D with a total of four points after going against Koji Iwamoto and Ryuki Honda, Zeus and Shigehiro Irie, and Takao Omori and Isami Kodaka, advanced to the semifinals where they outmatched Suwama and Shotaro Ashino but fell short to Kento Miyahara and Yuma Aoyagi in the finals. At the 2022 edition, they teamed up again to score a total of six points in the only block of the tournament after going against Kento Miyahara and Takuya Nomura, Shuji Ishikawa and Cyrus, Jake Lee and Yuma Aoyagi, Suwama and Kono, Jun Saito and Rei Saito, Yuji Nagata and Yuma Anzai, and Shotaro Ashino and Ryuki Honda.

=== Wrestle-1 (2015–2020) ===
Suzuki is probably best known for his time in the now-defunct promotion Wrestle-1. He made his professional wrestling debut at W-1 WRESTLE-1 Tour 2015 West Side Story on February 13, 2015, where he fell short to Shotaro Ashino in a singles competition. During his time in the company, he chased various titles promoted by it. Suzuki is a former four-time Wrestle-1 Tag Team Champion, titles which he held with two different partners, a four-time UWA World Trios Champion, and a former Wrestle-1 Result Champion. At W-1 WRESTLE-1 Tour 2019 Shining Winter on December 26, he unsuccessfully challenged Daiki Inaba for the Wrestle-1 Championship. On April 1, 2020, at W-1 WRESTLE-1 Tour 2020 Trans Magic, Wrestle-1 held its last event before closure. Suzuki teamed up with Shotaro Ashino as "Enfants Terribles" and Daiki Inaba and Koji Doi in a losing effort against Kaz Hayashi, Keiji Muto, Masayuki Kono, and Shuji Kondo as a result of an eight-man tag team match.

He is known for competing in various of the promotion's signature events. In the Wrestle-1 Grand Prix, which was the biggest yearly event promoted by the company, he made his first appearance at the 2015 edition which was also the first ever held, where he fell short to Ryota Hama in the first rounds. At the 2016 edition he fell short to Yasufumi Nakanoue in the first rounds. At the 2017 edition, he fell short to Manabu Soya in the first rounds. At the 2018 edition, he defeated Takanori Ito in the first rounds, but fell short to Koji Doi in the second ones. At the 2019 and final edition of the tournament, he defeated Pegaso Illuminar in the first rounds but fell short to Daiki Inaba in the second ones.

As for the Wrestle-1 Tag League, Suzuki made his first appearance at the 2017 edition where he teamed up with Koji Doi as "DoiKuma" and won the entire tournament. They finished the A Block on the second spot with three points after going against the teams of New Era (Daiki Inaba and Jiro Kuroshio), Tokyo Gurentai (Mazada and Nosawa Rongai), and Team 246 Presidents (Kaz Hayashi and Shuji Kondo), and then qualified for the semifinals where they defeated Beast Tyrant (Yuji Hino and Jake Omen), and furtherly Inaba and Kuroshio in the finals. At the 2018 edition, he teamed up with Shotaro Ashino and competed in block A where they failed to score any points after competing against Manabu Soya and Daiki Inaba, Kaz Hayashi and Pegaso Illuminar, Andy Wu and El Hijo del Pantera. At the 2019 and last edition, he teamed up with René Duprée and topped the block B with a total of six points after competing against Daiki Inaba and Koji Doi, Seiki Yoshioka, and El Lindaman, and Shuji Kondo and Manabu Soya, and then falling short to T-Hawk and Shigehiro Irie in the finals.

== Championships and accomplishments ==
- All Japan Pro Wrestling
  - Gaora TV Championship (1 time)
  - AJPW TV Six-Man Tag Team Championship (3 times) – with Hokuto Omori and Cyrus (1), Takashi Yoshida and Hokuto Omori (1), Ryuki Honda and Seigo Tachibana (1)
- Pro Wrestling Illustrated
  - Ranked No. 283 of the top 500 singles wrestlers in the PWI 500 in 2026
- Kyushu Pro-Wrestling
  - Kyushu Pro-Wrestling Tag Team Championship (1 time) – with Koji Doi
- Niigata Pro Wrestling
  - Niigata Tag Team Championship (1 time) – with Koji Doi
- Tenryu Project
  - Tenryu Project World 6-Man Tag Team Championship (1 time) – with Masayuki Kono and Yusuke Kodama
- Wrestle-1
  - Wrestle-1 Result Championship (1 time, final)
  - Wrestle-1 Tag Team Championship (4 times) – with Koji Doi (3) and Shotaro Ashino (1)
  - UWA World Trios Championship (4 times) – with Andy Wu and Koji Doi (1), Jay Freddie and Jiro Kuroshio (1), Jiro Kuroshio and Koji Doi (1), Koji Doi and Takanori Ito (1)
  - Wrestle-1 Tag League (2017) – with Koji Doi
