= Wrestle-1 Result Championship =

Professional wrestling championship

Details
- Promotion: Wrestle-1
- Date established: January 8, 2017
Statistics
- First champion: Koji Doi
- Final champion: Kuma Arashi
- Most reigns: Takanori Ito (2 reigns)
- Longest reign: Koji Doi (144 days)
- Shortest reign: Seigo Tachibana (22 days)
- Oldest champion: Koji Doi (27 years, 11 days)
- Youngest champion: Seigo Tachibana (20 years, 10 days)
- Heaviest champion: Takanori Ito (115 kg (254 lb))
- Lightest champion: Seigo Tachibana (69 kg (152 lb))

The Wrestle-1 Result Championship (WRESTLE-1 リザルトチャンピオンシップ, Wrestle-1 Rizaruto Chanpionshippu) was a professional wrestling championship owned by the Wrestle-1 (W-1) promotion. The title is meant for the promotion's younger wrestlers.

Like most professional wrestling championships, the title is won as a result of a scripted match. There have been seven reigns shared among six wrestlers.

== History ==
On January 8, 2017, Wrestle-1 announced the creation of the Wrestle-1 Result Championship, meant for the promotion's younger generation of wrestlers, which includes wrestlers from its sub-promotion Pro Wrestling ACE.

=== Championship tournament ===
A tournament to crown the inaugural Wrestle-1 Result Champion took place between January 15 and February 22, 2017. The tournament was mainly made up of Wrestle-1 and ACE wrestlers, but also included Ehime Puroresu representative Masayuki Mitomi.

First round (January 15, 22)
Koji Doi	Pin
Masayuki Mitomi	12:37
Kohei Fujimura	Pin
Ganseki Tanaka	07:30
Kumagoro	Pin
Seigo Tachibana	09:55
Hiroki Murase	Pin
Jun Tonsho	10:26

Semifinals (February 22)
Koji Doi	Pin
Ganseki Tanaka	07:04
Kumagoro	Pin
Hiroki Murase	12:17

Finals (February 22)
Koji Doi	Pin
Hiroki Murase	24:06

== Title history ==
Key
No.	Overall reign number
Reign	Reign number for the specific champion
Days	Number of days held
Defenses	Number of successful defenses
+	Current reign is changing daily

No.	Champion	Championship change			Reign statistics			Notes	Ref.
No.	Champion	Date	Event	Location	Reign	Days	Defenses	Notes	Ref.
1	Koji Doi	February 22, 2017	W-Impact	Tokyo	1	144	3	Doi defeated Hiroki Murase in the finals of an eight-man tournament to become the inaugural champion.	
2	Takanori Ito	July 16, 2017	Symbol	Osaka	1	26	1		
3	Seigo Tachibana	August 11, 2017	Flashing Summer	Tokyo	1	22	0		
4	Takanori Ito	September 2, 2017	2017 Puroresu Love in Yokohama	Yokohama	2	165	3		
5	Jiro Kuroshio	February 14, 2018	2018 W-Impact Tour	Tokyo	1	201	1		
6	Ganseki Tanaka	September 29, 2018	2018 Wrestle-1 5th Anniversary tour	Tokyo	1	49	1	Defeated Tsugutaka Sato in a tournament final	
7	Kumaarashi	November 17, 2018	2018 Wrestle-1 Autumn Bout tour	Tokyo	1	501	2	Kumaarashi returned the title due to dissatisfaction, further being declared as vacated on June 5, 2019. However, Wrestle-1 recognized Kumaarashi's reign as uninterrupted.	
—	Deactivated	April 1, 2020	—	—	—	—	—	Deactivated when Wrestle-1 closed.	

== Combined reigns ==
Rank	Wrestler	No. of reigns	Combined defenses	Combined days
1	Kumaarashi	1	2	501
2	Jiro Kuroshio	1	1	201
3	Takanori Ito	2	4	191
4	Koji Doi	1	3	144
5	Ganseki Tanaka	1	1	49
6	Seigo Tachibana	1	0	22

== See also ==
- List of National Wrestling Alliance championships
- IWGP Intercontinental Championship
- PWF World Asia Heavyweight Championship
- PWF Gaora Television Heavyweight Championship
- GHC National Championship
