= Wrestle-1 Tag Team Championship =

Professional wrestling tag team championship

- The Wrestle-1 Tag Team Championship belt (November 2014 — Present)

Details
- Promotion: Wrestle-1
- Date established: November 30, 2014
- Date retired: April 1, 2020
Statistics
- First champions: Team 246 (Kaz Hayashi and Shuji Kondo)
- Final champions: Daiki Inaba and Koji Doi
- Most reigns: (as a team) New Era (Koji Doi and Kumagoro) (3 reigns) (as an individual) Shuji Kondo (5 reigns)
- Longest reign: Team 246 (Kaz Hayashi and Shuji Kondo) (224 days)
- Shortest reign: Shuji Kondo and Seigo Tachibana (17 days)
- Oldest champion: Akira (52 years)
- Youngest champion: Takanori Ito (23 years, 226 days)
- Heaviest champion: Masayuki Kono, Yuji Okabayashi and Takanori Ito (115 kg (254 lb))
- Lightest champion: Kaz Hayashi (83 kg (183 lb))

The Wrestle-1 Tag Team Championship (WRESTLE-1タッグチャンピオンシップ, Wrestle-1 Taggu Chanpionshippu) was a professional wrestling tag team championship owned by the Wrestle-1 (W-1) promotion. The title was announced on September 22, 2014, in conjunction with the start of a tournament to crown the first Wrestle-1 Champion. In Japanese the title's name includes the katakana term for "championship", Chanpionshippu (チャンピオンシップ), derived from the English language instead of the more common kanji term Ōza (王座).

Like most professional wrestling championships, the title is won as a result of a scripted match. There have been eighteen reigns shared among sixteen teams and twenty one wrestlers.

== History ==
=== Championship tournament ===
On September 22, 2014, during the second day of a tournament to determine the inaugural Wrestle-1 Champion, it was announced that Wrestle-1 would also be introducing its own tag team championship. Through Wrestle-1's relationship with American promotion Total Nonstop Action Wrestling (TNA), the promotion had previously presented a match for the TNA World Tag Team Championship. The first Wrestle-1 Tag Team Champions would be crowned in the "First Tag League Greatest" round-robin tournament taking place between November 15 and 30, 2014. The two blocks containing the ten participating teams were revealed on November 3. The teams were later given official team names on November 14. In the tournament, a win was worth two points, a draw one point and a loss zero points. The top two teams from each block advanced to the semifinals and the winners wrestled in the tournament final to determine the inaugural champions. On November 27, Seiki Yoshioka pulled out of the tournament with a knee injury, forcing his team to forfeit their final match in the tournament. On November 30, Team 246 (Kaz Hayashi and Shuji Kondo) defeated the new Wild order (Akira and Manabu Soya) in the finals to win the tournament and become the inaugural Wrestle-1 Tag Team Champions.

Final standings
A		B	
Wrestlers	Score	Wrestlers	Score
Masayuki Kono and Tajiri (Desperado)	8	Kai and Ryota Hama (Akatenrou)	6
Kaz Hayashi and Shuji Kondo (Team 246)	6	Akira and Manabu Soya (new Wild order)	5
Jiro Kuroshio and Masakatsu Funaki (Ikemen Samurai)	4	Minoru Tanaka and Seiki Yoshioka (Too Sharp)	4
Taiyō Kea and Yasufumi Nakanoue (Sunrise)	2	Hiroshi Yamato and Seiya Sanada (Seiya to Hiroshi)	4
Mazada and Nosawa Rongai (Tokyo Gurentai)	0	Koji Doi and Yusuke Kodama (Novus)	1

A	Kuroshio Funaki	Hayashi Kondo	Kono Tajiri	Mazada Nosawa	Kea Nakanoue
Kuroshio Funaki	X	Hayashi; Kondo (12:10)	Kono; Tajiri (10:52)	Kuroshio; Funaki (09:55)	Kuroshio; Funaki (12:38)
Hayashi Kondo	Hayashi; Kondo (12:10)	X	Kono; Tajiri (14:46)	Hayashi; Kondo (06:28)	Hayashi; Kondo (13:28)
Kono Tajiri	Kono; Tajiri (10:52)	Kono; Tajiri (14:46)	X	Kono; Tajiri (03:35)	Kono; Tajiri (09:18)
Mazada Nosawa	Kuroshio; Funaki (09:55)	Hayashi; Kondo (06:28)	Kono; Tajiri (03:35)	X	Kea; Nakanoue (07:54)
Kea Nakanoue	Kuroshio; Funaki (12:38)	Hayashi; Kondo (13:28)	Kono; Tajiri (09:18)	Kea; Nakanoue (07:54)	X
B	Akira Soya	Yamato Sanada	Kai Hama	Doi Kodama	Tanaka Yoshioka
Akira Soya	X	Draw (30:00)	Kai; Hama (16:22)	Akira; Soya (09:52)	Akira; Soya (14:46)
Yamato Sanada	Draw (30:00)	X	Yamato; Sanada (17:08)	Draw (30:00)	Tanaka; Yoshioka (15:50)
Kai Hama	Kai; Hama (16:22)	Yamato; Sanada (17:08)	X	Kai; Hama (12:05)	Kai; Hama (forfeit)
Doi Kodama	Akira; Soya (09:52)	Draw (30:00)	Kai; Hama (12:05)	X	Tanaka; Yoshioka (10:20)
Tanaka Yoshioka	Akira; Soya (14:46)	Tanaka; Yoshioka (15:50)	Kai; Hama (forfeit)	Tanaka; Yoshioka (10:20)	X

Semifinals
A1	Kono and Tajiri	Pin
B2	Akira and Soya	09:15
B1	Kai and Hama	Pin
A2	Hayashi and Kondo	11:37

Final
Akira and Soya	Pin
Hayashi and Kondo	26:05

== Title history ==
Key
No.	Overall reign number
Reign	Reign number for the specific team—reign numbers for the individuals are in parentheses, if different
Days	Number of days held
Defenses	Number of successful defenses
+	Current reign is changing daily

No.	Champion	Championship change			Reign statistics			Notes	Ref.
No.	Champion	Date	Event	Location	Reign	Days	Defenses	Notes	Ref.
1	Team 246 (Kaz Hayashi and Shuji Kondo)	November 30, 2014	First Tag League Greatest	Tokyo	1	224	7	Hayashi and Kondo defeated Akira and Manabu Soya in the finals of a ten-team tournament to become the inaugural champions.	
2	new Wild order (Jun Kasai and Manabu Soya)	July 12, 2015	Symbol	Tokyo	1	138	2		
3	TriggeR (Masayuki Kono and Shuji Kondo (2))	November 27, 2015	Autumn Bout	Tokyo	1	100	0		
4	Real Desperado (Kazma Sakamoto and Yuji Hino)	March 6, 2016	Trans Magic	Sendai	1	94	2		
5	Yasufumi Nakanoue and Yuji Okabayashi	June 8, 2016	Outbreak	Tokyo	1	51	1		
6	new Wild order (Jun Kasai and Manabu Soya)	July 29, 2016	Symbol	Tokyo	2	22	0		
—	Vacated	August 20, 2016	—	—	—	—	—	Title vacated due to Soya being sidelined with a shoulder injury.	
7	Kaz Hayashi (2) and Kotaro Suzuki	September 18, 2016	3rd Anniversary	Tokyo	1	183	3	Hayashi and Kondo defeated "brother" Yasshi and Shuji Kondo to win the vacant title.	
8	New Era (Koji Doi and Kumagoro)	March 20, 2017	Trans Magic	Tokyo	1	45	1		
9	Masayuki Kono (2) and Takanori Ito	May 4, 2017	Triumph	Tokyo	1	51	1		
10	New Era (Koji Doi and Kumagoro)	June 24, 2017	Outbreak	Yokohama	2	70	1		
11	Team 246 (Kaz Hayashi (3) and Shuji Kondo (3))	September 2, 2017	2017 Puroresu Love in Yokohama	Yokohama	2	78	1		
12	New Era (Koji Doi and Kumagoro)	November 19, 2017	Autumn Bout	Chiba	3	150	1		
13	new Wild order (Manabu Soya (3) and Akira)	April 18, 2018	2018 Cherry Blossom	Tokyo	1	18	0		
14	Enfant Terribles (Kumaarashi (4) and Shotaro Ashino (1))	May 6, 2018	2018 Triumph	Tokyo	1	47	0	Arashi previously known as Kumagoro.	
15	Jiro Kuroshio and Masato Tanaka	June 22, 2018	2018 Triumph	Tokyo	1	50	0		
16	Shuji Kondo (4) and Koji Doi (4)	August 11, 2018	2018 Flashing Summer	Tokyo	1	173	3		
—	Vacated	January 31, 2019	—	—	—	—	—	Title vacated.	
17	Masayuki Kono (3) and Alejandro	March 21, 2019	Wrestle Wars 2019	Tokyo	1	82	2	Kono and Alejandro defeated Kaz Hayashi and Pegaso Iluminar to win the vacant title.	
18	Shuji Kondo (5) and Seigo Tachibana	June 11, 2019	2019 Outbreak Tour	Tokyo	1	17	0		
—	Vacated	June 28, 2019	—	—	—	—	—	Title vacated due to Tachibana suffering an injury.	
19	Enfant Terribles (Shotaro Ashino (2) and Yusuke Kodama)	August 1, 2019	2019 Flashing Summer Tour	Tokyo	1	227	3	Ashino and Kodama defeated Shuji Kondo and Manabu Soya to win the vacant titles.	
20	Daiki Inaba and Koji Doi (5)	March 15, 2020	Wrestle Wars 2020	Tokyo	1	17	0		
—	Deactivated	April 1, 2020	—	—	—	—	—	Deactivated when Wrestle-1 closed.	

== Combined reigns ==
As of October 22, 2026

†	Indicates the current champions

=== By team ===
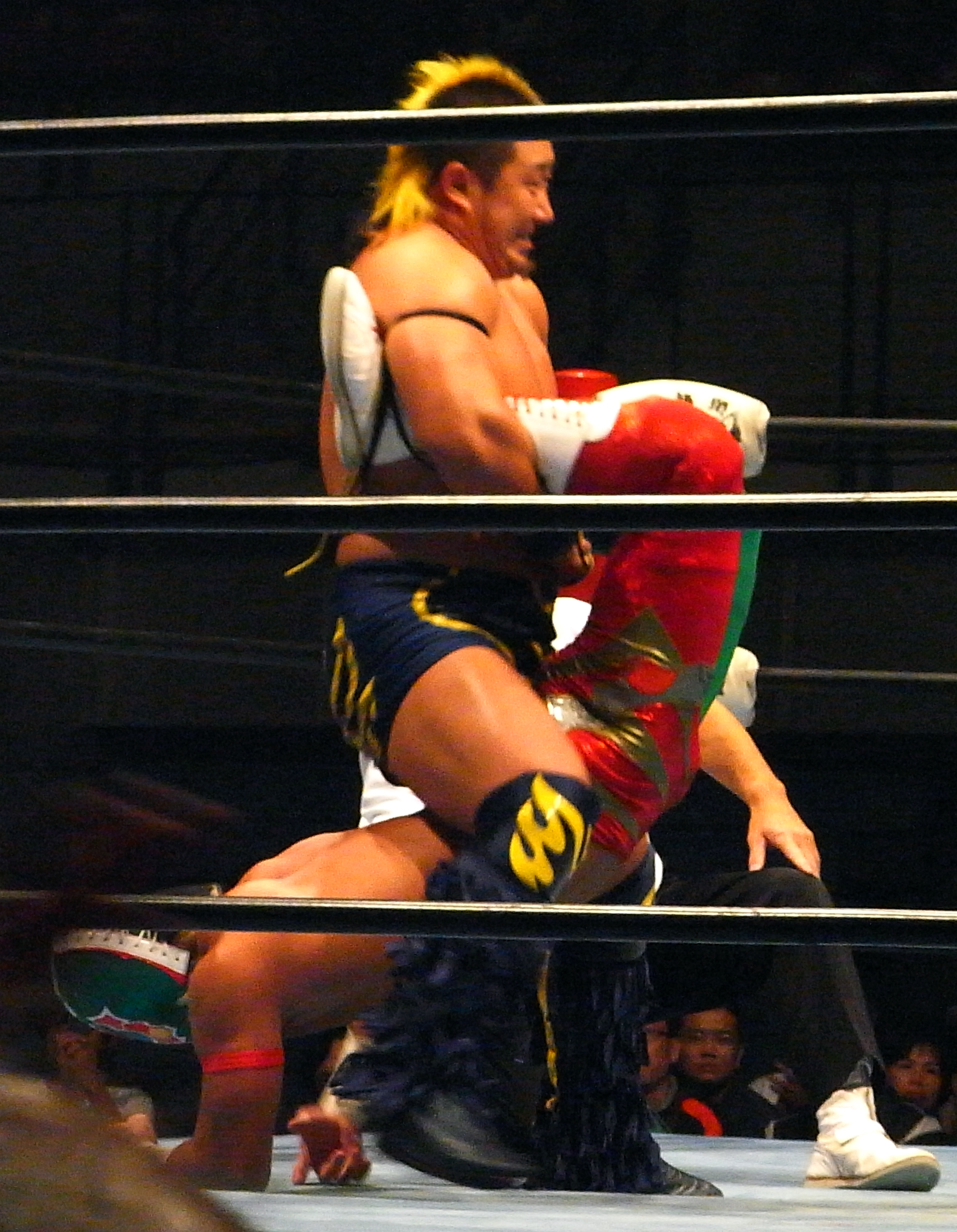
Shuji Kondo

Rank	Team	No. of reigns	Combined defenses	Combined days
1	Team 246 (Kaz Hayashi and Shuji Kondo)	2	8	302
2	New Era (Koji Doi and Kumagoro)	3	3	265
3	Enfant Terribles (Shotaro Ashino and Yusuke Kodama)	1	3	227
4	Kaz Hayashi and Kotaro Suzuki	1	3	183
5	Shuji Kondo and Koji Doi	1	3	173
6	new Wild order (Jun Kasai and Manabu Soya)	2	2	160
7	TriggeR (Masayuki Kono and Shuji Kondo)	1	0	100
8	Real Desperado (Kazma Sakamoto and Yuji Hino)	1	2	94
9	Masayuki Kono and Takanori Ito	1	1	51
10	Masayuki Kono and Alejandro	1	2	82
11	Yasufumi Nakanoue and Yuji Okabayashi	1	1	51
12	Jiro Kuroshio and Masato Tanaka	1	0	50
13	Enfant Terribles (Kuma Arashi and Shotaro Ashino)	1	0	47
14	new Wild order (Manabu Soya and Akira)	1	0	18
15	Shuji Kondo and Seigo Tachibana	1	0	17
16	Daiki Inaba and Koji Doi	1	0	17

=== By wrestler ===
Rank	Wrestler	No. of reigns	Combined defenses	Combined days
1	Shuji Kondo	5	11	592
2	Koji Doi	5	6	455
3	Kumagoro/Kumaarashi	4	3	312
4	Kaz Hayashi	3	11	302
5	Shotaro Ashino	2	3	274
6	Yusuke Kodama	1	3	227
7	Masayuki Kono	3	3	223
8	Kotaro Suzuki	1	3	183
9	Manabu Soya	3	2	178
10	Jun Kasai	2	2	160
11	Kazma Sakamoto	1	2	94
11	Yuji Hino	1	2	94
13	Alejandro	1	2	82
14	Takanori Ito	1	1	51
14	Yasufumi Nakanoue	1	1	51
14	Yuji Okabayashi	1	1	51
17	Jiro Kuroshio	1	0	50
17	Masato Tanaka	1	0	50
19	Akira	1	0	18
20	Seigo Tachibana	1	0	17
20	Daiki Inaba	1	0	17

== See also ==
- World Tag Team Championship (AJPW)
- IWGP World Tag Team Championship
- GHC Tag Team Championship
- NWA Intercontinental Tag Team Championship
