= Takanori Ito =

Japanese professional wrestler

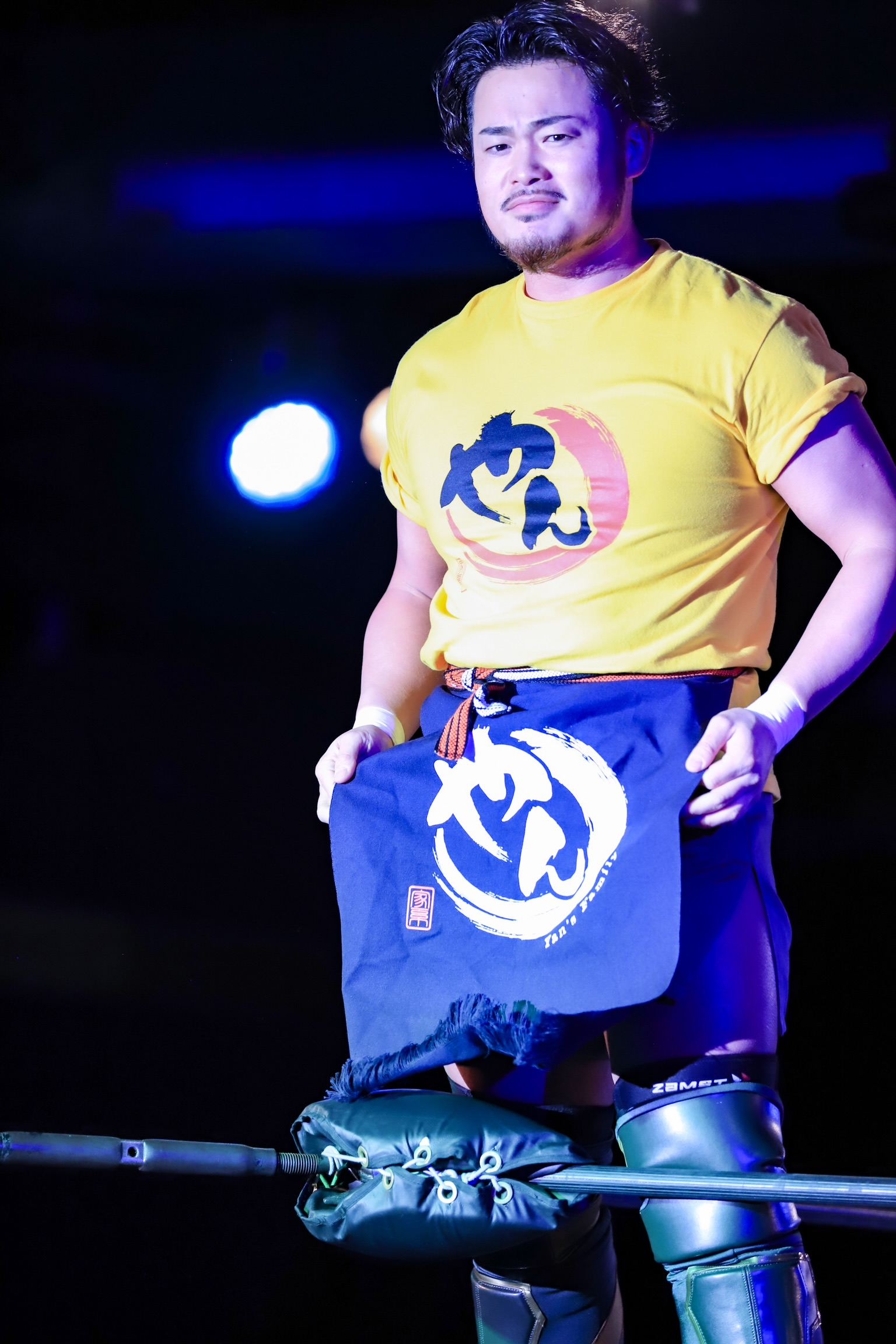
- Ito in February 2023

Personal information
- Born: September 20, 1993 (age 33) Osaka, Japan

Professional wrestling career
- Ring name: Takanori Ito
- Billed height: 1.80 m (5 ft 11 in)
- Billed weight: 115 kg (254 lb)
- Trained by: Wrestle-1 Dojo
- Debut: September 18, 2016

Takanori Ito (伊藤 貴則, Itō Takanori; born September 20, 1993) is a Japanese professional wrestler who currently wrestles for Gleat. He is best known for working for Wrestle-1, where he is a two-time Wrestle-1 Result Champion and a one-time Wrestle-1 Tag Team Champion, alongside Masayuki Kono. He also won the Striker Full Contact Karate Heavyweight Championship.

== Early life ==
Before entering the Wrestle-1 dojo, Ito had a background on Karate where he has a black belt.

== Professional wrestling career ==
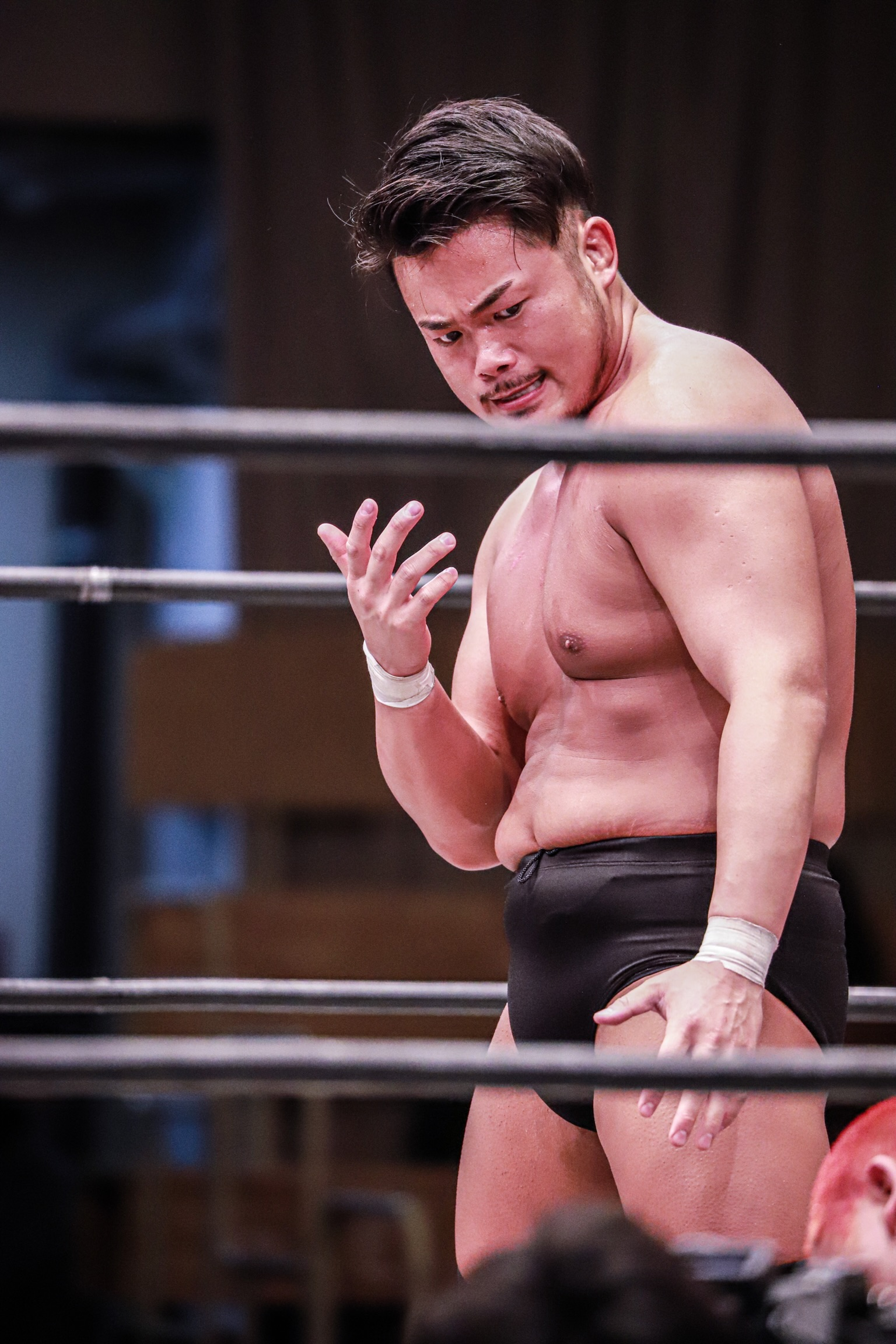
Ito in February 2022

=== Wrestle-1 (2016–2020) ===
On September 18, 2016, Ito made his wrestling debut with his mate Dennis Shinohara in a losing effort to Mazada and Nosawa Rongai. On November 12, after he scored his first win defeating another rookie Kohei Fujimura, it was announced that he would be joining his rookie mates at Pro Wrestling A.C.E.

On April 19, Masayuki Kono challenged Koji Doi and Kumagoro into a title match for the Wrestle-1 Tag Team Championship. Kono announced that he would find himself an appropriate teammate which end up to being Ito. On May 4, Ito and Kono defeated Koji Doi and Kumagoro to win the Wrestle-1 Tag Team Championship. They would make one successful title defense on June 6 against Manabu Soya and Ganseki Tanaka before losing the titles back to Doi and Kumagoro on June 24. On July 2 Ito defeated Seigo Tachibana in the finals of a tournament to earn the right to enter in the Wrestle-1 Grand Prix. At the Wrestle-1 Grand Prix, Ito managed to get into the semifinals losing to his tag team partner Masayuki Kono. After the loss, Ito won his first singles title in his career defeating Koji Doi on July 16 to win the Wrestle-1 Result Championship. Ito would defend the title once defeating Kumagoro on August 6 before he lost the title to Seigo Tachibana four days later. On September 2, Ito would rematch Tachibana for the Result Championship, emerging victorious and regaining the championship. From September to October, Ito teamed with Kono in the 2017 Wrestle-1 Tag League where they placed second in Block B with 4 points. On October 8, Ito made his first successful defense defeating Ganseki Tanaka. On November 2, Ito successfully defended the title a second time defeated Daiki Inaba. On December 2, Ito became a double champion when he teamed with Koji Doi and Kumagoro to win the UWA World Trios Championship.

On January 14, 2019, Ito successfully defended the Result Championship for a third time against Dyna Mido. On February 14, Ito lost the Result Championship to Jiro Kuroshio. One month later on March 14, Ito, Doi, and Kumagoro lost the UWA World Trio Titles to Fujita, Mazada, and Nosawa Rongai. In July, Ito participated in the 2018 Wrestle-1 Grand Prix but lost in the first round to Kumaarashi (formerly Kumagoro). In the fall, Ito then entered the 2018 Wrestle-1 Tag League teaming with Ryuji Hijikata where they tied for second in Block B with two points. After Ito lost to Super Tiger at a Real Japan Pro Wrestling event on September 20, he suffered a torn ACL and sat out the next fifteen months. After recovering, Ito returned to the ring at Wrestle-1's Wonder Carnival event on December 31, 2019, where he teamed with Andy Wu and Jiro Kuroshio in a losing effort to Jun Akiyama, Kaz Hayashi, and Shinjiro Otani. On March 31, 2020, Ito, along with the rest of the roster, was released from Wrestle-1 when the promotion ceased operations. On April 1, Ito wrestled at Wrestle-1's final show defeating Pegaso Iluminar. He then participated in a battle royal which was won by Manabu Soya.

== Championships and accomplishments ==
=== Professional wrestling ===
- Gleat
  - Lidet UWF World Championship (2 times, current, inaugural)
  - UWF Rules Tournament (2021)
- Wrestle-1
  - UWA World Trios Championship (1 time) – with Koji Doi and Kumagoro
  - Wrestle-1 Tag Team Championship (1 time) – with Masayuki Kono
  - Wrestle-1 Result Championship (2 times)
  - Wrestle-1 Grand Prix Decision Tournament (2017)

=== Karate ===
- Striker
  - Full Contact Karate Heavyweight Championship (1 time)
