= Shuji Kondo =

Japanese professional wrestler (born 1978)

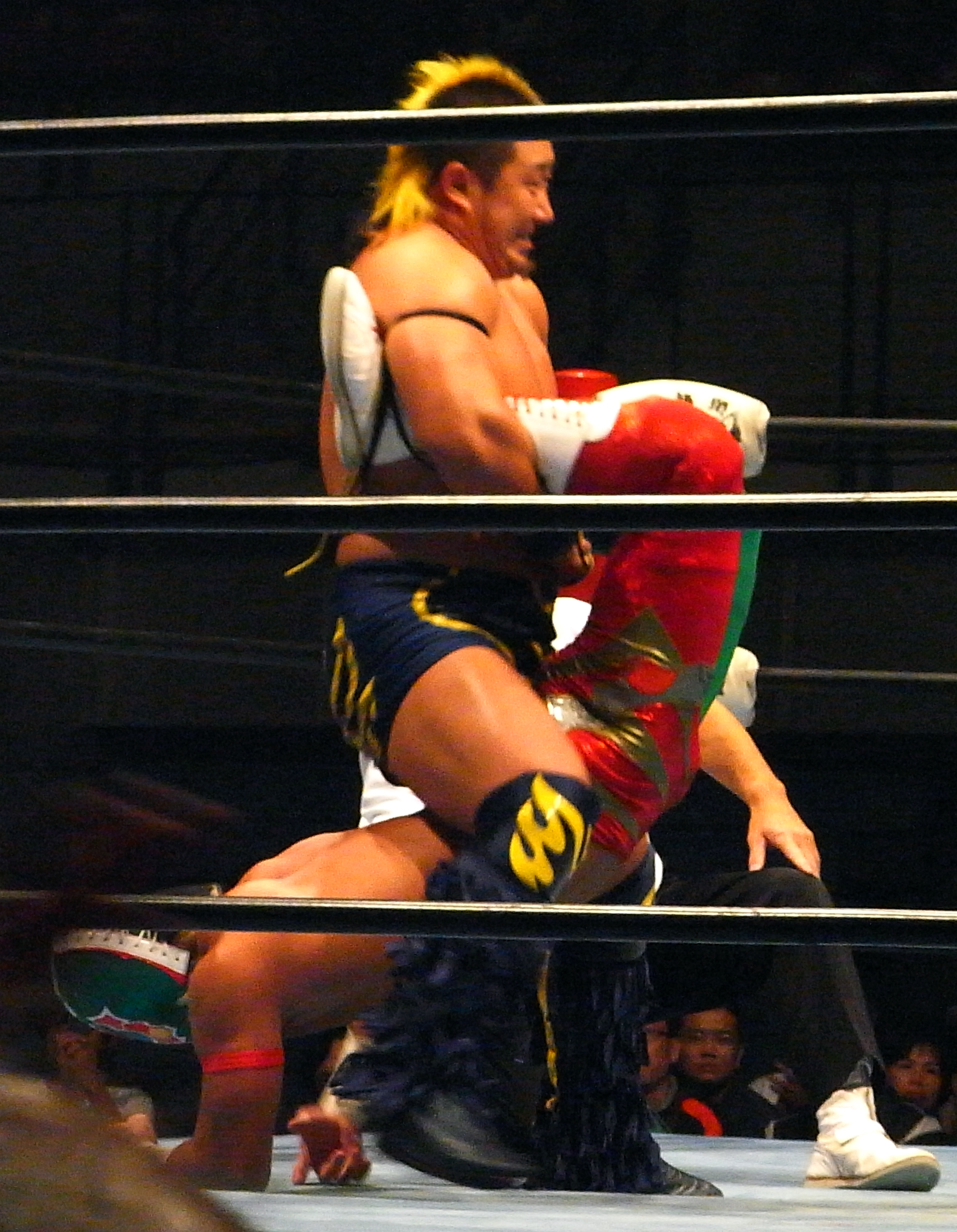
- Kondo in 2010

Personal information
- Born: January 21, 1978 (age 48) Fuji, Shizuoka

Professional wrestling career
- Ring name(s): Shuji Kondo; Condotti Shuji; Dotti Shuji
- Billed height: 1.73 m (5 ft 8 in)
- Billed weight: 95 kg (209 lb)
- Trained by: Último Dragón; Skayde
- Debut: May 18, 2001

Shuji Kondo (近藤修司, Kondō Shūji; born January 21, 1978) is a Japanese professional wrestler. Prior to becoming a pro wrestler, he played rugby. After starting his career in Toryumon, Kondo eventually joined All Japan Pro Wrestling (AJPW), where he became one of the promotion's top junior heavyweights, winning the World Junior Heavyweight Championship three times and the All Asia Tag Team Championship once. Upon leaving AJPW in 2013, Kondo joined Wrestle-1, where he became half of the inaugural Wrestle-1 Tag Team Champions. Kondo also worked as the vice president, booker and trainer for Wrestle-1 until its closure in 2020. He now works as a freelancer in promotions like Pro Wrestling Basara and DragonGate.

== Professional wrestling career ==
=== Toryumon/Dragon Gate ===
Kondo was part of the T2P class in Toryumon. At first he was a face in the Toryumon Seikigun.

He would turn heel and join the Italian Connection, changing his name to Condotti Shuji, after the shopping district. One of his stablemates in the ItaCon was "brother" Yasshi, who has remained a firm ally of his ever since.

In 2003, the ItaCon was divided over the face/heel issue, with Kondo leading the heel side. He would lead the turn, briefly rename to Dotti Shuji, and soon after revert to his real name. He and Yasshi formed a group called Hagure Gundam (Rogue Corps in English) with fellow ItaCon member Shogo Takagi, and Toru Owashi. When Hagure Gundam was joined by Masaaki Mochizuki, it was renamed Aagan Iisou. Mochizuki would later be kicked out of the stable after he and Kondo feuded over who was leader, and Takuya Sugawara was added to the group.

On December 31, 2004, all five members of Aagan Iisou – Kondo, Yasshi, Sugawara, Owashi, and Shogo – were fired from Dragon Gate, the newly renamed Toryumon, for alleged behavioral problems.

=== Dragondoor ===
Kondo was built up as the heel ace of the Dragondoor promotion. All five members of Aagan Iisou were on the roster, but Kondo only aligned himself with YASSHI and Sugawara. Despite the three of them being the heels, they received most of the fan support over the babyfaces.

=== All Japan Pro Wrestling ===
He soon joined AJPW, where he and long-time associate "brother" Yasshi would ally themselves with Taru's Voodoo Murders stable and even hold the All-Asia Tag Team Titles for a short time. The Voodoo Murderers were previously in an intense feud against RO&D, but defeated their long-time foes after D'Lo Brown and Buchanan turned on RO&D and joined the Voodoo Murderers. Kondo also became the World Junior Heavyweight Champion having won the title from junior ace Taka Michinoku. On February 17, 2007, Kondo lost the Jr. Heavyweight Title to Katsuhiko Nakajima, thus ending his 1-year, 4-month title reign. Kondo would remain a regular top player in AJPW's junior division for the next several years – a run which included a tag-team with Kaz Hayashi and occasionally working with the heavyweights in tag-team action as a partner of Suwama. His allegiance with both men would be defining parts of his tenure through his working with both men across multiple factions in big-match scenarios. As AJPW and Pro Wrestling NOAH began working together more in 2011–2013, Shuji began working NOAH as a part-time outsider and, as an AJPW representative, would defeat NOAH's Yoshinobu Kanemaru for the GHC Junior Heavyweight Championship on September 29, 2012. Before the year was out, Kondo would return twice to NOAH for successful defenses against Atsushi Aoki and Kotaro Suzuki, respectively. His third defense would be on January 2, 2013, in a dual-title match against reigning AJPW World Junior Heavyweight Champion Hiroshi Yamato. With the victory over Yamato, Kondo became the first person to hold both AJPW and GHC Junior Championships simultaneously; though, the dual-title run would be short lived as Kondo would lose the GHC Junior Title to old dragondoor rival Taiji Ishimori on January 28. In that same month, the new incarnation of the Burning faction – Jun Akiyama, Go Shiozaki, Yoshinobu Kanemaru, Kotaro Suzuki, and Atsushi Aoki – would invade AJPW after leaving their old home of Pro Wrestling NOAH the month prior. All members immediately challenged for AJPW gold and on February 23, Kondo would fall to Kanemaru to end his second reign. On March 4, 2013, Kondo joined Suwama and Joe Doering as a member of the stable, Last Revolution. In June 2013, Kondo announced his resignation from All Japan in the aftermath of Nobuo Shiraishi taking over as the president and Keiji Mutoh leaving the promotion. His final match as an AJPW roster member was on June 30 when he and Kaz Hayashi challenged unsuccessfully for the All Asia Tag Team Championship being held by Burning's Aoki and Suzuki.

On January 25, 2018, Kondo returned to AJPW as a Wrestle-1 representative for an eight-man tag team match. Despite having competed for the heavyweight division there and in other promotions, Kondo participated in the Jr. Battle of Glory. Kondo would win his block with a 4–1 record, and go on to defeat 2017 tournament winner, Koji Iwamoto, in the Final. The tournament victory would lead to an unsuccessful challenge for Atsushi Aoki's World Junior Heavyweight Championship on March 25. Kondo would next return on August 3, teaming with freelancer Kotaro Suzuki for a run in the Junior Tag Battle of Glory which ended at an even 3–3 record. Though unsuccessful in the tournament, Kondo did get another direct pinfall over Koji Iwamoto in their league match which led to Kondo being nominated as Iwamoto's first challenger for Koji's newly-won Junior Title. On September 22, Kondo regained the World Junior Heavyweight Championship for a third time. His third reign would last two months – passing a defense against Hikaru Sato before losing the title back to Koji Iwamoto on November 29.

=== El Dorado ===
Kondo is also one of the main players in dragondoor's successor, El Dorado. Unlike in dragondoor, Kondo was set up to be the face ace of the promotion. He and YASSHI split for the first time in years, with YASSHI briefly leading his own faction. Kondo started a faction called Sukiyaki, named after his famous love of meat dishes. When his friend and fellow Dragon Gate exile Naoki Tanisaki abruptly left El Dorado and returned to Dragon Gate, Kondo disbanded Sukiyaki. After defeating Magnitude Kishiwada on August 15, 2008 to win the Greatest Golden League, Kondo announced his departure from El Dorado.

=== Wrestle-1 ===
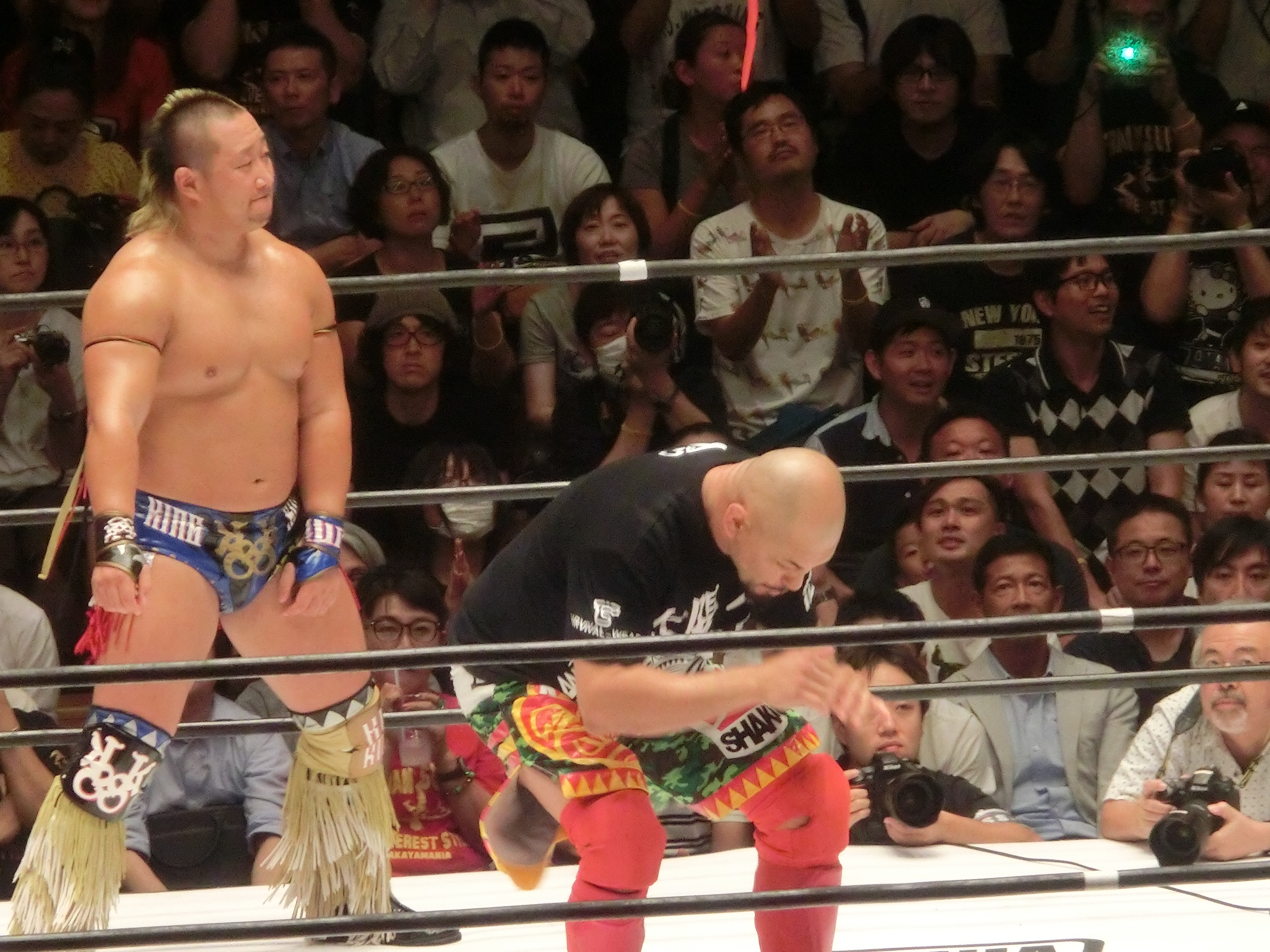
Kondo (left) with Taiyo Kea (right) in 2018.

On July 10, 2013, Kondo was announced as part of Keiji Mutoh's new Wrestle-1 promotion. During the promotion's inaugural event on September 8, Kondo teamed with Kaz Hayashi in a tag team match, where they were defeated by the Big Japan Pro Wrestling team of Daisuke Sekimoto and Yuji Okabayashi. As part of a working relationship between Wrestle-1 and American promotion Total Nonstop Action Wrestling (TNA), Kondo and Hayashi earned a shot at the TNA World Tag Team Championship by defeating Desperado (Kazma Sakamoto and Masayuki Kono) on February 15, 2014. On March 2 at Kaisen: Outbreak, Kondo and Hayashi unsuccessfully challenged The Wolves (Davey Richards and Eddie Edwards) for the TNA World Tag Team Championship in a three-way match, which also included The BroMans (Jessie Godderz and Robbie E), who went on to win the match and become the new champions. On September 22, Kondo entered the Wrestle-1 Championship tournament, defeating his tag team partner Hayashi in his first round match. The following day, he defeated Hiroshi Yamato to advance to the semifinals of the tournament. On October 8, Kondo was eliminated from the tournament in the semifinals by Kai. Through Wrestle-1's relationship with Pro Wrestling Zero1, Kondo and Seiki Yoshioka won the NWA International Lightweight Tag Team Championship on November 7 by defeating "brother" Yasshi and Takuya Sugawara. In November, Kondo and Hayashi took part in the First Tag League Greatest tournament, set to determine the inaugural Wrestle-1 Tag Team Champions, where they finished second in their block with a record of three wins and one loss, advancing to the semifinals. On November 30, Kondo and Hayashi first defeated Kai and Ryota Hama in the semifinals and then Akira and Manabu Soya in the finals to win the tournament and become the inaugural Wrestle-1 Tag Team Champions. On March 1, 2015, Kondo and Yoshioka lost the NWA International Lightweight Tag Team Championship back to Yasshi and Sugawara. After seven successful title defenses, Kondo and Hayashi lost the Wrestle-1 Tag Team Championship to Jun Kasai and Manabu Soya on July 12, 2015.

On October 9, 2015, Kondo broke off his partnership with Hayashi and formed a new stable with Masayuki Kono and rookies Hiroki Murase and Shotaro Ashino. On October 31, the stable was named TriggeR. On November 27, Kondo and Kono won the Wrestle-1 Tag Team Championship. They lost the title to Kazma Sakamoto and Yuji Hino on March 6, 2016. On December 9 Kondo with Jun Kasai and Nosawa Rongai defeated Andy Wu, Daiki Inaba and Seiki Yoshioka to win the UWA World Trios Championship.

On March 27, 2017, it was announced that Kondo would become Wrestle-1's new executive vice president on April 1, serving under new president Kaz Hayashi.

== Championships and accomplishments ==
- All Japan Pro Wrestling

- All Asia Tag Team Championship (1 time) – with "brother" Yasshi
- World Junior Heavyweight Championship (3 times)
- Junior League/Jr. Battle of Glory (2009, 2018)
- Junior Tag League (2012) – with Kaz Hayashi
- Mika Kayama Cup (2010) – with Kohei Suwama
- Aquamarine Cup Tag Tournament (2005) – with "brother" Yasshi

- Dragon Gate
  - Open the Twin Gate Championship (1 time) – with Kenoh
- El Dorado Wrestling

- Treasure Hunters Tag Tournament (2006) – with Dick Togo
- Greatest Golden League (2008)

- Pro-Wrestling Basara

- UWA World Trios Championship (1 time, current) – with Takuya Sugawara and Toru Owashi

- Pro Wrestling Illustrated

- PWI ranked him #236 of the top 500 singles wrestlers in the PWI 500 in 2013

- Pro Wrestling Noah

- GHC 200 Championship (1 time, current)
- GHC Junior Heavyweight Championship (1 time)
- GHC Junior Heavyweight Tag Team Championship (2 times) – with Hajime Ohara (1) and Eita (1)

- Pro Wrestling Zero1

- NWA International Lightweight Tag Team Championship (1 time) – with Seiki Yoshioka

- Tokyo Sports

- Match of the Year (2008) – vs. Naomichi Marufuji on November 3, 2008
- Tag Team Of The Year (2006) – with Taru, Suwama, & "brother" Yasshi

- Toryumon Japan

- British Commonwealth Junior Heavyweight Championship (1 time)
- UWA World Trios Championship (2 times) – with Milano Collection A.T. and Yossino (1), and Toru Owashi and "brother" Yasshi (1)
- Rey de Parejas (2003) – with "brother" Yasshi

- Wrestle-1

- UWA World Trios Championship (3 times) – with Jun Kasai and Nosawa Rongai (1), Kaz Hayashi and Masayuki Kono (1), and Kaz Hayashi and Manabu Soya (1)
- Wrestle-1 Tag Team Championship (5 times) – with Kaz Hayashi (2), Koji Doi (1), Masayuki Kono (1), and Seigo Tachibana (1)
- Tag League Greatest (2014) – with Kaz Hayashi
- Wrestle-1 Tag League (2018) – with Koji Doi
