= Jiro Kuroshio =

Japanese professional wrestler (born 1992)

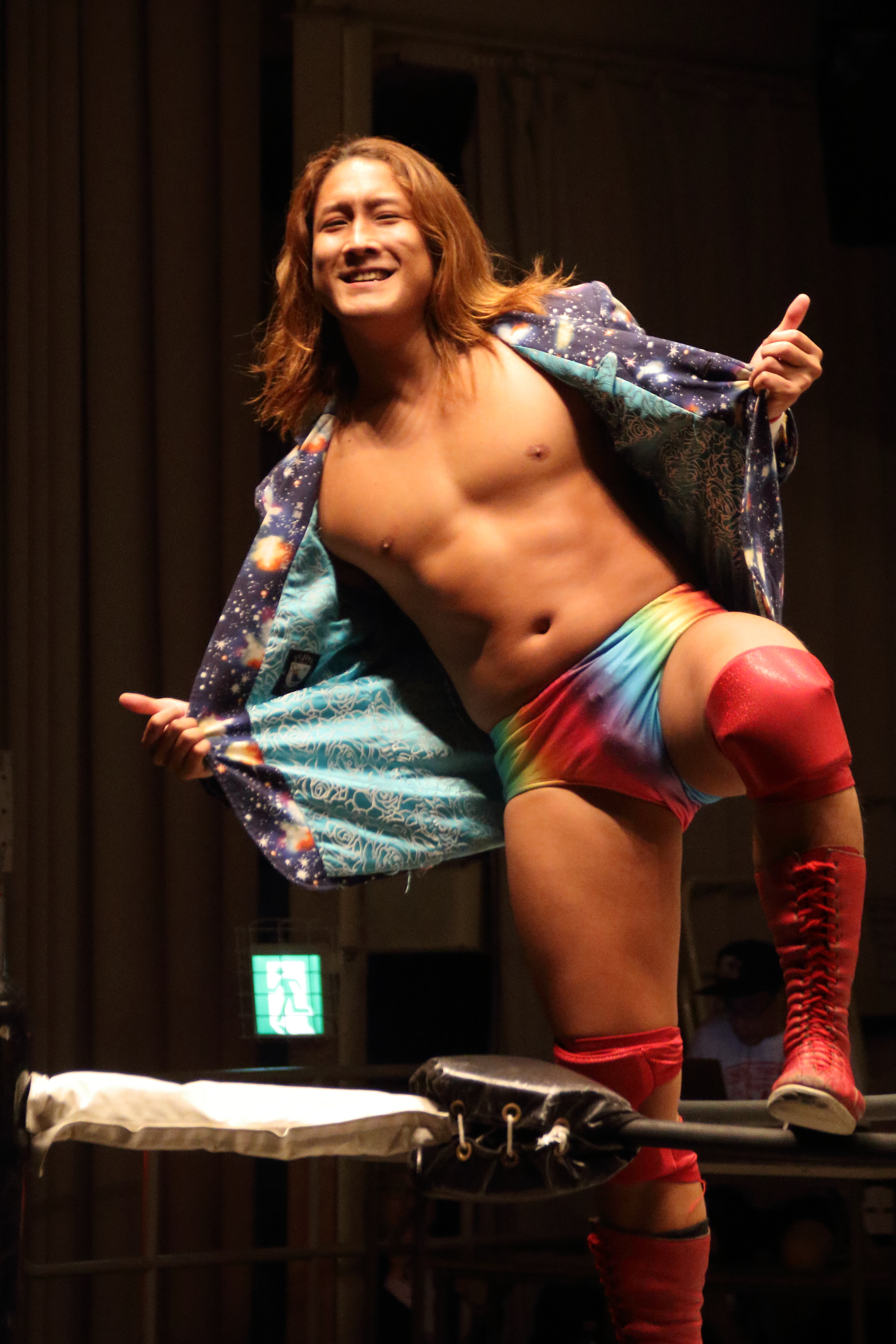
- Kuroshio in 2017

Personal information
- Born: Sōjirō Higuchi; September 19, 1992 (age 33) Adachi, Tokyo, Japan

Professional wrestling career
- Ring names: Bu Saiku; Ikemen Jiro; Jiro "Ikemen" Kuroshio; Jiro Kuroshio; Kuroshio Tokyo Japan; Sōjirō Higuchi
- Billed height: 5 ft 11 in (1.80 m)
- Billed weight: 176 lb (80 kg)
- Billed from: Japan
- Trained by: Yoshihiro Tajiri
- Debut: December 30, 2011

Sōjirō Higuchi (Japanese: 樋口 壮士朗, Hepburn: Higuchi Sōjirō; born September 19, 1992), best known as Jiro "Ikemen" Kuroshio (黒潮"イケメン"二郎, Kuroshio "Ikemen" Jirō) and currently performing as Kuroshio Tokyo Japan (黒潮TOKYOジャパン, Kuroshio Tōkyō Japan), is a Japanese professional wrestler and Internet personality.

Higuchi is known for his work in the Wrestle-1 promotion, where he was a former Wrestle-1 Result Champion and Wrestle-1 Tag Team Champion before leaving the promotion in January 2019. He worked for WWE from 2020 until his release in 2023, performing for the NXT brand under the ring name Ikemen Jiro, where he notably formed a tag team with Kushida known as Jacket Time.

Higuchi portrays an ikemen character, reflected in his aliases, ring attire and mannerisms. Since his release from WWE in 2023, he has gone under the ring name Kuroshio Tokyo Japan, retaining his ikemen character in the process.

== Early life ==
Higuchi was born in Adachi, Tokyo. When he was young, he often attended professional wrestling events with his father, who was a fan. His father became friends with the elder brother of Yoshihiro Tajiri, which in turn led to a friendship with Tajiri himself. He started training with Tajiri's Hustle promotion when he was 14. However, without a definite plan towards making a professional debut plus other commitments beyond wrestling such as school, Higuchi's interest in wrestling waned and at one time he moved away from the sport. He eventually returned to wrestling by joining the Smash promotion's training camp.

== Professional wrestling career ==
=== Early career ===
Using the ring name Jiro Kuroshio, Higuchi made his professional wrestling debut on December 30, 2011, against fellow camp attendee Koji Doi at the "Smash 24" event. He adopted the name "Kuroshio" from the name of the nabemono restaurant operated by his parents, "Nabeya Kuroshio". The Smash promotion folded in March 2012 and on April 5, 2012, Kuroshio, along with Tajiri and all other wrestlers, referees and trainees, moved to the spin-off Wrestling New Classic promotion.

At WNC Before the Dawn, Kuroshio wrestled the very first match for Wrestling New Classic, losing to Josh O'Brien. At an event at Korakuen Hall on August 30, 2012, after defeating Koji Doi, Kuroshio announced he had become an apprentice of Hajime Ohara and joined Ohara's unit "DQN". On July 16, Kuroshio, Lin Byron and Tsubasa defeated The Bodyguard, Mio Shirai and Takuya Kito in the finals of a one night six person tournament to win the 2012 Kito Cup, with Byron pinning the tournament's creator Kito for the win. He also participated in 2012's Dave Finlay Cup, losing to Koji Doi in the semi-final. In 2013 he changed his ring name to "Jiro Ikemen Kuroshiro" and adopted an "ikemen" character. Like the year before, he participated in the Dave Finlay Cup, losing to Kaji Tomato. On July 1, 2014, Kuroshio moved to the Wrestle-1.

=== Wrestle-1 (2014–2020) ===
Making his Wrestle-1 debut in April 2014, Kuroshio became an official member of the roster on July 1, when Kuroshio along with Tajiri, Akira, Yusuke Kodama, Koji Doi and Rionne Fujiwara left WNC. Kuroshio quickly formed the stable Novus with fellow WNC alumni Kodama, Doi and Fujiwara. In August, he defeated Andy Wu in a qualification bout, earning the right to enter the inaugural Wrestle-1 Championship tournament, he would go on to lose to Masayuki Kono in the first round. In November, he formed the "Ikemen Samurai" tag-team partnership with Masakatsu Funaki and competed in the inaugural Wrestle-1 Tag-Team Championship tournament. With Kuroshio teaming with Funaki and Doi joining Desperado, Novus quietly disbanded. On May 30, 2015, Kuroshio would win the "Road to Keiji Mutoh Tournament" earning the right to face Keiji Mutoh in a one-on-one match, he would lose to Mutoh on June 18. Also in June, Ikemen Samurai would come to an end with Funaki leaving the promotion. Kuroshio would make it to the semi-finals of the 2015 Wrestle-1 Grand Prix before losing to the eventual winner Manabu Soya but gained impressive wins over his former mentor Tajiri and former Wrestle-1 Champion Kai.

Following the tournament, Kuroshio formed the stable Jackets with Yasufumi Nakanoue and Seiki Yoshioka. On October 9, the trio defeated New Wild Order (Akira, Jun Kasai and Kumagoro) to win the vacant UWA World Trios Championship. On November 3, they lost the titles to Real Desperado (Kazma Sakamoto, Koji Doi and Nosawa Rongai) but would regain the belts on November 27. On January 7, 2016, Jackets would vacate the titles due to Yoshioka being sidelined following cecum surgery and being unable to attend a title defense set for January 10. On January 31, Jackets lost to Kaz Hayashi, Minoru Tanaka and Tajiri for the vacant title. In mid 2016 Jackets disbanded when Nakanoue left Wrestle-1.

On November 27, 2016, Kuroshio defeated Yohei Nakajima for the Gaora TV Championship, his first singles title reign. On December 7 Kuroshio, Andy Wu, Daiki Inaba, Yusuke Kodama, Seiki Yoshioka, Koji Doi, Kumagoro and Kohei Fujimura formed a stable named New Era. Kuroshio suffered a posterior cruciate ligament injury during a match against Shotaro Ashino on January 8, 2017, forcing him to vacate the Gaora TV Championship in February as he was unable to make the mandatory title defense.

On March 23, 2019, Kuroshio announced his departure from Wrestle-1, with his last match under contract scheduled to take place on April 3 in Korakuen Hall. Kuroshio made his American debut a month later on April 5, at an independent event in New York City, defeating Rich Swann. Kuroshio periodically returned to Wrestle-1 as a freelancer and participated in a battle royal on the promotion's last card on April 1, 2020.

=== WWE (2020–2023) ===
In December 2020, WWE announced Kuroshiro as a recruit to the WWE Performance Center. On May 7, 2021, Kuroshio debuted on 205 Live under the name Ikemen Jiro, teaming with August Grey to defeat Tony Nese and Ariya Daivari. Jiro would then continue to team with Grey on 205 Live until June when Grey was released from WWE. On July 6, Jiro was announced to be a part of the 2021 NXT Breakout Tournament. On the July 13 episode of NXT, Jiro was eliminated in the first round by Duke Hudson. Soon after, Jiro would form a tag team called Jacket Time with Kushida and the pair would feud with The Diamond Mine. In January 2022, Jacket Time would compete in the 2022 Dusty Rhodes Tag Team Classic but were eliminated in the first round by 2021 winners MSK (Nash Carter and Wes Lee), on the January 25 episode of NXT 2.0. On April 18, Kushida would depart WWE thus disbanding Jacket Time. Jiro was released on September 21, 2023.

=== All Japan Pro Wrestling (2023–present) ===
On October 21, 2023, in the All Japan Pro Wrestling (AJPW) 51st Anniversary Tour, Kuroshio was revealed as an entrant in the World's Strongest Tag League under the ring name Kuroshio Tokyo Japan (黒潮TOKYOジャパン), in a team with Seigo Tachibana.

=== DDT Pro-Wrestling (2023–present) ===
On October 22, 2023, Kuroshio appeared in DDT Pro-Wrestling at God Bless DDT 2023, making his return to the promotion since his last match in 2020. He challenged rookie Takeshi Masada to a singles bout at Ultimate Party 2023 after he had been recommended by Konosuke Takeshita over in America. Kuroshio went on to win the match.

== Championships and accomplishments ==
- All Japan Pro Wrestling
  - Gaora TV Championship (2 times)
- DDT Pro-Wrestling
  - DDT Extreme Championship (1 time)
  - Ironman Heavymetalweight Championship (1 time)
- Gleat
  - G-Infinity Championship (2 times) – with Seigo Tachibana (1) and Cima (1)
- Pro Wrestling Up Town
  - Up Town Championship (1 time)
- Kuroshio Tokyo Japan Produce
  - Smash Championship (1 time)
- Professional Wrestling Just Tap Out
  - Independent World Junior Heavyweight Championship (1 time)
- Pro Wrestling Illustrated
  - Ranked No. 228 of the top 500 singles wrestlers in the PWI 500 in 2018
- Strong Style Pro-Wrestling
  - Legend Championship (1 time, current)
- Wrestle-1
  - UWA World Trios Championship (4 times) – with Yasufumi Nakanoue and Seiki Yoshioka (2), Jay Freddie and Kumagoro (1), and Koji Doi and Kumagoro (1)
  - Wrestle-1 Result Championship (1 time)
  - Wrestle-1 Tag Team Championship (1 time) – with Masato Tanaka
  - Wrestle-1 Grand Prix (2017)
  - Road To Keiji Mutoh Tournament (2015)
- Wrestling New Classic
  - Kito Cup (2012) – with Lin Byron and Tsubasa
