= Yasufumi Nakanoue =

Japanese professional wrestler (born 1986)

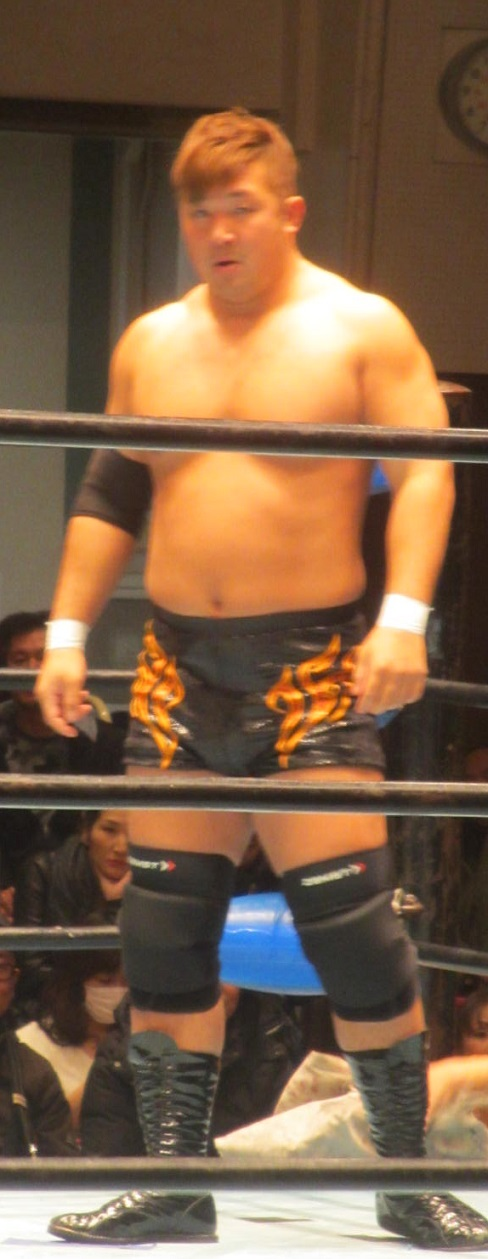
- Nakanoue in December 2016

Personal information
- Born: Yasufumi Nakaue; 14 June 1986 (age 40) Osaka, Japan

Professional wrestling career
- Ring name(s): Yasu; Yasufumi Nakanoue
- Billed height: 6 ft 0 in (1.83 m)
- Billed weight: 200 lb (91 kg)
- Trained by: Animal Hamaguchi; Kaz Hayashi; Satoshi Kojima
- Debut: January 2, 2010

Yasufumi Nakaue (中上 靖文, Nakaue Yasufumi; born June 14, 1986) is a Japanese professional wrestler, better known by the ring name Yasufumi Nakanoue (中之上 靖文, Nakanoue Yasufumi), currently signed to Big Japan Pro Wrestling (BJW) in the Strong BJ division, where he was the BJW World Strong Heavyweight Champion. He started his career in All Japan Pro Wrestling (AJPW) and has also worked for Wrestle-1 (W-1), where he is a former one-time Wrestle-1 Tag Team Champion and a two-time UWA World Trios Champion.

== Professional wrestling career ==
=== All Japan Pro Wrestling (2010–2013) ===
Nakanoue debuted for All Japan Pro Wrestling (AJPW) on January 2, 2010, losing to Shuji Kondo. On April 29, 2013, Nakanoue teamed with Sushi in a losing effort against Kaz Hayashi and Shuji Kondo. Despite the loss, Hayashi and Kondo offered him a spot in Last Revolution, which Nakanoue accepted. On October 7, Nakanoue reached the finals of a tournament to crown the inaugural Gaora TV Champion, losing to Seiya Sanada. Following backstage issues that led to Keiji Mutoh's resignation from AJPW, Nakanoue and several other wrestlers also resigned effective July 1. On June 30, Nakanoue teamed with Joe Doering for his last match with AJPW, losing to Taiyō Kea and Takao Omori.

=== Wrestle-1 (2013–2016) ===
On July 10, 2013, Nakanoue was announced as part of Keiji Mutoh's new Wrestle-1 (W-1) promotion. During the promotion's inaugural event on September 8, Nakanoue teamed with Ryota Hama in a tag team match, where they were defeated by Kohei Sato and Ryouji Sai. At Kaisen: Outbreak, Nakanoue lost to Satoshi Kojima. On March 9, 2014, Nakanoue appeared for Total Nonstop Action Wrestling as part of TNA's working agreement with Wrestle-1, teaming with The Great Muta and Sanada to defeat Chris Sabin, Christopher Daniels and Kazarian in a six-man tag team steel cage match at Lockdown. On May 4, Nakanoue and Seiki Yoshioka unsuccessfully challenged Strongest-K Tag Team Champions Hiroki and Yuji Hino. In November, he teamed with Taiyō Kea in the First Tag League Greatest but failed to progress to the semifinals. In September 2015, Nakanoue would form the stables Jackets with Jiro Kuroshio and Seiki Yoshioka. On October 9, the trio defeated new Wild order (Akira, Jun Kasai and Kumagoro) for the newly revived UWA World Trios Championship. On November 3, they lost the titles to Real Desperado (Kazma Sakamoto, Koji Doi and Nosawa Rongai) but would regain the belts on November 27. On January 7, 2016, Jackets would vacate the titles due to Yoshioka being sidelined following cecum surgery and being unable to attend a title defence set for January 10. On January 31, Jackets lost to Kaz Hayashi, Minoru Tanaka and Tajiri for the vacant title. In April, Nakanoue began teaming with Big Japan Pro Wrestling (BJW)'s Yuji Okabayashi and split his time between Wrestle-1 and BJW. On June 8, they won the Wrestle-1 Tag Team Championship from Real Desperado's Kazma Sakamoto and Yuji Hino. On June 28, it was announced that Nakanoue and several other wrestlers would be leaving Wrestle-1 due to their contracts expiring. Nakanoue and Okabayashi remained champions until June 29 when they lost them to new Wild order's Jun Kasai and Manabu Soya.

=== Big Japan Pro Wrestling (2016–present) ===
Nakanoue began making regular appearances for Big Japan Pro Wrestling (BJW) in April 2016 after forming a tag team with Yuji Okabayashi. After leaving Wrestle-1, Nakanoue wrestled predominantly for BJW. On August 24, he and Okabayashi unsuccessfully challenged Twin Towers (Kohei Sato and Shuji Ishikawa) for the BJW Tag Team Championship. From September 4 to October 31, Nakanoue teamed with Ryuichi Kawakami as part of the Strong B Block but missed out on the quarterfinals. On October 9, he unsuccessfully challenged Hideyoshi Kamitani for the BJW World Strong Heavyweight Championship. On May 25, he teamed with former Wrestle-1 talent Ryota Hama to challenge BJW Tag Team Champions Strong BJ (Daisuke Sekimoto and Yuji Okabayashi) and lost. In July, Nakanoue officially signed with BJW.

Nakanoue continued teaming with Hama and they won the Yokohama Shopping Street 6-Man Tag Team Championship with Shogun Okamoto from Moon Vulcan (Hideki Suzuki, Takuya Nomura and Yoshihisa Uto) on July 3. From September 6 and October 15, Nakanoue and Hama participated in the 2017 Saikyo Tag League as part of the Strong Block; they failed to advance to the semi-finals with only four points. On December 17, Hama, Nakanoue and Okamoto lost the Yokohama Shopping Street 6-Man Tag Team Championship to Daisuke Sekimoto, Hideyoshi Kamitani and Kohei Sato. On February 27, he unsuccessfully challenged Daichi Hashimoto for the BJW World Strong Heavyweight Championship. Nakanoue entered the 2018 Ikkitousen Strong Climb on March 8 and finished the group stages runner up; in the semifinals he lost to eventual winner Hideki Suzuki. On April 21, Nakanoue, Hama and Yoshihisa Uto won the Yokohama Shopping Street Six Man Tag Team Championship from Sekimoto, Kamitani and Sato. From May 22 to June 20, they lost and regained the Championship on three occasions, before losing the titles permanently to the 3rd Generation Chimidoro Brothers (Masaya Takahashi, Takayuki Ueki and Toshiyuki Sakuda) on July 24. Starting on August 12, Nakanoue and Hama entered the 2018 Saikyo Tag League where the vacant BJW Tag Team Championship was held up. They dominated the Strong Block, gaining ten points from five wins, and defeated Abdullah Kobayashi and Yoshihisa Uto in the semi-finals on October 16. Three days later, they won the Yokohama Shopping Street 6-Man Tag Team Championship from the 3rd Generation Chimidoro Brothers with Takeshi Irei. On October 25, Hama and Nakanoue won the Saikyo Tag League and BJW Tag Team Championship when they defeated Daichi Hashimoto and Hideyoshi Kamitani. At Ryogokutan 2018, on November 11, they successfully defended their titles against Takayuki Ueki and Toshiyuki Sakuda, but lost the Yokohama Shopping Street 6-Man Tag Team Championship to the 3rd Generation Chimidoro Brothers six days later. On July 21, Hama and Nakanoue lost the BJW Tag Team Championship to Sekimoto and The Bodyguard. In March 2020, Nakanoue entered the Ikkitousen Strong Climb but was out of the tournament early due to the tournament was cut short due to the COVID-19 pandemic and he missed out on the semifinals. On July 24, he unsuccessfully challenged Daichi Hashimoto for the BJW World Strong Heavyweight Championship a second time.

After a relatively quiet year for Nakanoue, he started 2021 off with a bang, winning the BJW World Strong Heavyweight Championship from Yuji Okabayashi on January 2.

== Championships and accomplishments ==
- Big Japan Pro Wrestling
  - BJW Tag Team Championship (1 time) – with Ryota Hama
  - BJW World Strong Heavyweight Championship (1 time)
  - Yokohama Shopping Street 6-Man Tag Team Championship (10 times) – with Ryota Hama and Shogun Okamoto (1), Ryota Hama and Yoshihisa Uto (4), and Ryota Hama and Takeshi Irei (1), Chicharito Shoki and Yuji Okabayashi (1), Kazumasa Yoshida and Daichi Hashimoto (1), Kazumi Kikuta and Yuya Aoki (1), Daisuke Sekimoto and Kazumi Kikuta (1)
  - Saikyo Tag League (2018) – with Ryota Hama
  - Shuffle Tag Tournament (2019) – with Yuya Aoki
  - UWA World Tag Team Championship (1 time) – with Andy Wu
- Pro Wrestling Illustrated
  - Ranked No. 168 of the top 500 singles wrestlers in the PWI 500 in 2022
- Wrestle-1
  - UWA World Trios Championship (2 times) – with Jiro Kuroshio and Seiki Yoshioka
  - Wrestle-1 Tag Team Championship (1 time) – with Yuji Okabayashi
