= Masayuki Kono =

Japanese professional wrestler and MMA fighter (born 1980)

Masayuki Kono 河野真幸
Personal information
- Born: April 12, 1980 (age 46) Noboribetsu, Hokkaido

Professional wrestling career
- Ring name(s): Masayuki Kono; Kono
- Billed height: 1.92 m (6 ft 3 1/2 in)
- Billed weight: 115 kg (254 lb)
- Trained by: All Japan Pro Wrestling; Keiji Mutoh; Hiroshi Hase; Animal Hamaguchi
- Debut: March 29, 2003

Masayuki Kono
- Born: April 12, 1980 (age 46); Noboribetsu, Hokkaido
- Nationality: Japanese
- Height: 1.92 m (6 ft 3 1/2 in)
- Weight: 108 kg (238 lb)
- Division: Heavyweight
- Years active: 2005–2008

Mixed martial arts record
- Total: 8
- Wins: 3
- By knockout: 2
- By submission: 1
- Losses: 5
- By knockout: 3
- By submission: 2

Other information
- Mixed martial arts record from Sherdog

Masayuki Kono (河野 真幸, Kōno Masayuki; born April 12, 1980 in Noboribetsu, Hokkaidō) is a Japanese professional wrestler and former mixed martial artist. He is working as a freelancer. He is best known for his time in Wrestle-1, where he is a former two-time Wrestle-1 Champion.

== Career ==
=== All Japan Pro Wrestling (2003–2005) ===
Kono began training in the All Japan Dojo in late 2002 and made his debut on March 28, 2003 in a losing effort to Nobutaka Araya. For the next two years, Kono was largely featured in opening matches where he worked with fellow newcomers and older wrestlers, often coming out on the losing end, a common practice for young wrestlers in Japan as a way of paying dues. During this time, Kono had no title matches and did not take part in any tournaments. In 2005, he left All Japan and professional wrestling to pursue a career in Mixed Martial Arts.

=== Mixed martial arts (2005–2008) ===
In early 2005, Kono began a MMA career fighting for Pancrase Hybrid Wrestling. He won his first fight at Pancrase – Spiral 5 on July 10, 2005 defeating Yukio Kawabe by Technical Submission. He then lost to Aslan Dzeboev by Knockout at Pancrase – Spiral 8 on October 2. He then went on a two fight win streak defeating Teymur Aliyev at Pancrase – Blow 4 and Daniel Lyons at Pancrase – Blow 7 both by TKO. Kono then lost his last four fights, losing to Mu Bae Choi by Technical Submission at Pancrase – Blow 10, then to Tetsuya Mizuno at Pancrase – Rising 9 by TKO. His next appearance was at Warrior Realm 12 where he lost to Brad Morris by Submission. His most recent fight was a loss to Stanislav Nedkov at Pancrase – Shining 10 by TKO.

=== Return to All Japan (2009–2013) ===
By early 2009, Kono had retired from MMA and returned to professional wrestling. He spent the first few months of 2009 in Canada, wrestling on the independents before returning to All Japan in May 2009. Upon his return, Kono was pushed immediately, as he teamed Keiji Mutoh to defeat Satoshi Kojima and Suwama with Kono submitting Kojima. Throughout the spring and summer, Kono often competed in tag team matches for the All Japan army and occasionally teamed with Mutoh. On July 5, 2009, he received his first title shot when he unsuccessfully teamed with Mutoh to challenge Minoru Suzuki and Taiyo Kea for the World Tag Team Championship. In the fall of 2009, Kono teamed with Suwama in the 2009 World's Strongest Tag Determination League. The two were able to make it to the finals but lost to Mutoh and Masakatsu Funaki.

In his first big victory of 2010, Kono defeated Suwama at Pro Wrestling Love in Ryogoku Vol. 9 on March 21, 2010. In the spring, he entered the 2010 Champion Carnival, finishing second in his block with 5 points, allowing him to advance to the semi-finals where he fell to Funaki. Following the Champion Carnival, Kono joined the New Generation Force stable with Suwama, Ryota Hama, Seiya Sanada, and Manabu Soya and from there began a feud with the Partisan Forces stable (Minoru Suzuki, Masakatsu Funaki, Akebono, and Taiyo Kea). On July 4, 2010, Kono challenged Suzuki for the Triple Crown Heavyweight Championship but lost. At Pro Wrestling Love in Ryogoku Vol. 10 on August 29, Kono faced Masakatsu Funaki and lost by Knockout. In September 2010, the New Generation Force disbanded, and shortly afterward, Kono joined the Voodoo Murders and began wrestling simply as Kono (stylised in all capital letters). On November 5, 2010, Kono teamed with Minoru to win a Number 1 Contenders tournament for the All Asia Tag Team Championship, but lost the following the day in the title match against Seiya Sanada and Manabu Soya. In late November, Kono entered the 2010 World's Strongest Tag Determination League teaming with Kenso. The two emerged victorious, defeating Suwama and Ryota Hama in the finals.

On January 3, 2011, Kono and Kenso challenged Taiyo Kea and Akebono for the World Tag Team Championship but lost. On February 6, Kono and Joe Doering defeated Taiyo Kea and Akebono to win the World Tag Team Championship. On June 3, 2011, in the aftermath of a backstage fight between Yoshikazu Taru and Nobukazu Hirai which resulted in Hirai suffering a stroke, All Japan immediately disbanded the Voodoo Murders, suspended all of its Japanese members, including Kono, and vacated the Unified World Tag Team Championship. Kono was suspended specifically for not attempting to stop Taru's assault on Hirai. Kono's suspension was lifted on June 30. At a press conference, Kono announced that he would be returning to performing under his real name. Kono made his return to All Japan on October 10, 2011, teaming with Joe Doering and Osamu Nishimura in a six-man tag team match, where they were defeated by Akebono, Masakatsu Funaki and Ryota Hama. On January 4, 2012, Kono made a special appearance for New Japan Pro-Wrestling at Wrestle Kingdom VI in Tokyo Dome, where he teamed with Masakatsu Funaki to defeat the New Japan Seigigun of Yuji Nagata and Wataru Inoue. On June 20, 2013, Kono, following Funaki, announced his resignation from All Japan out of loyalty to Keiji Mutoh, who had left the promotion when Nobuo Shiraishi took over as its new president at the beginning of the month. Kono's final match for the promotion took place on June 30 and saw him, Funaki and Koji Kanemoto lose to Akebono, Osamu Nishimura and Ryota Hama in a six-man tag team match.

=== Wrestle-1 (2013–2020) ===
On July 10, 2013, Kono was announced as part of Keiji Mutoh's new Wrestle-1 promotion. During the promotion's inaugural event on September 8, Kono teamed with Masakatsu Funaki in a tag team match, where they were defeated by Katsuyori Shibata and Kazushi Sakuraba. Following the match, Kono turned on Funaki, hitting his mentor with a steel chair and beating him down with help from Kohei Sato and Ryoji Sai. Kono and Funaki faced off in a singles match at Wrestle 1's second show on September 15, where Kono was victorious with help from Sai and Kazma Sakamoto. Kono, Sai and Sakamoto, replacing an injured Kohei Sato, formed a stable named Desperado, which was in October also joined by René Duprée. In early 2014, after Desperado had failed in their attempt to recruit Kai to the stable, Kono entered a new feud with the self-proclaimed ace of Wrestle-1. The feud culminated on July 6 in a grudge match, where Kono put the future of Desperado on the line. Kono, however, was victorious over Kai, forcing him to have his head shaved. On September 21, Kono entered the Wrestle-1 Championship tournament, defeating Jiro Kuroshio in his first round match. The following day, Kono handed Wrestle-1 founder Keiji Mutoh his first loss since March 2012 by submitting him in a three-on-four handicap match, where he, Kazma Sakamoto and Ryoji Sai faced Mutoh and the Novus stable (Jiro Kuroshio, Koji Doi and Rionne Fujiwara). On September 23, Kono defeated Yusuke Kodama to advance to the semifinals of the Wrestle-1 Championship tournament. On October 8, Kono defeated Masakatsu Funaki in their semifinal match, after Funaki's training partner Tajiri turned on him and joined Desperado. Later that same day, Kono defeated Kai to win the tournament and become the inaugural Wrestle-1 Champion. Following his win, Kono nominated Keiji Mutoh as his first challenger for the title, claiming that he was going to retire Mutoh at his 30th anniversary event on November 1. On November 1, Kono lost the title to Mutoh in his first defense. Later that same month, Kono and Tajiri took part in the First Tag League Greatest tournament, set to determine the inaugural Wrestle-1 Tag Team Champions, where they won their block with a clean record of four wins and zero losses, advancing to the semifinals. On November 30, Kono and Tajiri were eliminated from the tournament in the semifinals by Akira and Manabu Soya. On August 2, 2015, the rest of Desperado turned on Kono, kicking him out of the stable. Kono then started a feud with his former stablemate Kazma Sakamoto over the rights to the name Desperado. On September 6, Kono was defeated by Sakamoto and Koji Doi in a handicap match, when his scheduled partner Nosawa Rongai turned on him and, as a result, lost the name Desperado to the new trio of Sakamoto, Doi and Nosawa. On October 9, Kono formed a new stable with Shuji Kondo and rookies Hiroki Murase and Shotaro Ashino. On October 31, the stable was named TriggeR. On November 27, Kono and Kondo won the Wrestle-1 Tag Team Championship. They lost the title to Kazma Sakamoto and Yuji Hino on March 6, 2016. On November 2, Kono defeated Daiki Inaba to win the Wrestle-1 Championship for the second time. He lost the title to Shotaro Ashino on March 20, 2017. On March 31, 2020, Kono, along with the rest of Wrestle-1's roster was released as the promotion ceased operations on April 1. On April 1, Kono participated in Wrestle-1's final event teaming with Mutoh, Hayashi, and Kondo in a losing effort against Daiki Inaba, Koji Doi, Shotaro Ashino, and Kuma Arashi. Following this, he competed in a battle royal which was won by Manabu Soya.

=== Freelancer (2020 - ) ===
Kono has competed as a freelancer since the closure of Wrestle-1. He has promoted a number of events with Andy Wu.

== Championships and accomplishments ==
- All Japan Pro Wrestling

- World Tag Team Championship (2 times) – with Joe Doering (1) and Suwama (1)
- AJPW TV Six-Man Tag Team Championship (1 time) – with Hideki Suzuki and Shota Kofuji
- World's Strongest Tag Determination League (2010) – with Kenso

- Pro Wrestling Illustrated

- PWI ranked him #157 of the top 500 singles wrestlers in the PWI 500 in 2011

- Tenryu Project

- Tenryu Project United National Heavyweight Tag Team Championship (1 time) – with Kohei Sato
- Tenryu Project World 6-Man Tag Team Championship (4 times) – with Kenichiro Arai and Kohei Sato (1), Kuma Arashi and Yusuke Kodama (1) and Kengo and Yuya Susumu (2)

- Wrestle-1

- UWA World Trios Championship (1 time) – with Kaz Hayashi and Shuji Kondo
- Wrestle-1 Championship (2 times)
- Wrestle-1 Tag Team Championship (3 times) – with Shuji Kondo (1) Takanori Ito (1) and Alejandro (1)
- Wrestle-1 Championship Tournament (2014)

== Mixed martial arts record ==
Professional record breakdown
8 matches	3 wins	5 losses
By knockout	2	3
By submission	1	2

Res.	Record	Opponent	Method	Event	Date	Round	Time	Location	Notes
Loss	3–5	Stanislav Nedkov	TKO (punches)	Pancrase: Shining 10	December 7, 2008	1	1:35	Tokyo, Japan	
Loss	3–4	Brad Morris	Submission (punches)	WR 12: Warriors Realm 12	February 9, 2008	1	1:32	Australia	
Loss	3–3	Tatsuya Mizuno	TKO (punches)	Pancrase: Rising 9	November 28, 2007	1	3:28	Tokyo, Japan	
Loss	3–2	Mu Bae Choi	Technical Submission (arm-triangle choke)	Pancrase: Blow 10	December 2, 2006	2	2:36	Tokyo, Japan	
Win	3–1	Daniel Lyons	TKO (punches)	Pancrase: Blow 7	September 16, 2006	1	3:46	Tokyo, Japan	
Win	2–1	Teymur Aliyev	TKO (punches)	Pancrase: Blow 4	May 2, 2006	1	4:09	Tokyo, Japan	
Loss	1–1	Aslan Dzeboev	KO (punch)	Pancrase: Spiral 8	October 2, 2005	1	4:12	Yokohama, Kanagawa, Japan	
Win	1–0	Yukio Kawabe	Technical Submission (kimura)	Pancrase: Spiral 5	July 10, 2005	1	1:10	Yokohama, Japan	
