= Yuji Okabayashi =

Japanese wrestler (born 1982)

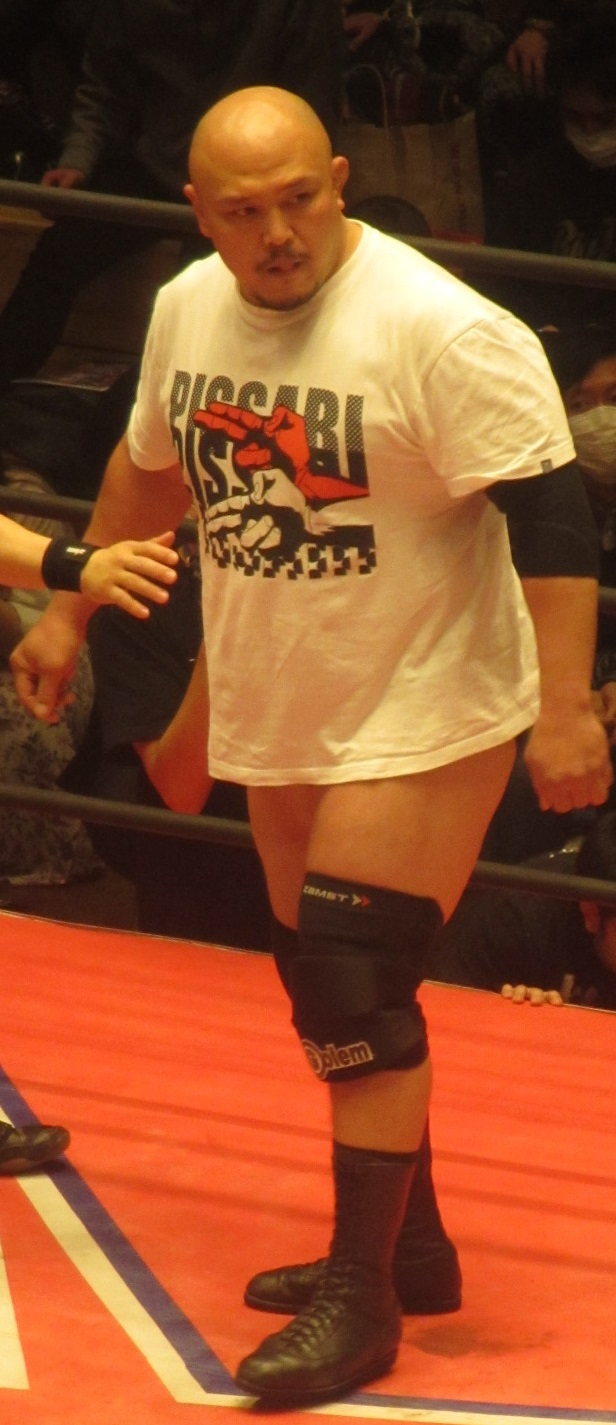
- Okabayashi in 2019

Personal information
- Born: October 31, 1982 (age 44) Nankoku, Kōchi

Professional wrestling career
- Ring name(s): Gregory Okabayashi; Shining Tiger Big Buddy; Yuji Okabayashi
- Billed height: 175 cm (5 ft 9 in)
- Billed weight: 120 kg (265 lb)
- Trained by: Big Japan Pro Wrestling dojo
- Debut: June 27, 2008

Yuji Okabayashi (岡林 裕二, Okabayashi Yūji; born October 31, 1982) is a Japanese semi-retired professional wrestler. He is currently signed to Big Japan Pro Wrestling (BJW) in the Strong BJ division, but is on an indefinite absence. Known as "The Golem", he has been working in BJW since his debut in June 2008, and is best known as part of a tag team with Daisuke Sekimoto, with whom he has held the BJW Tag Team Championship, All Japan Pro Wrestling's (AJPW) World Tag Team and All Asia Tag Team Championships and DDT Pro-Wrestling (DDT)'s KO-D Tag Team Championship. As a singles wrestler, he is notably a four-time BJW World Strong Heavyweight Champion.

== Professional wrestling career ==
=== Big Japan Pro Wrestling (2008–present) ===
Okabayashi is a former member of the Japan Self-Defense Forces and had a sports background in judo and weightlifting, when he joined Big Japan Pro Wrestling (BJW) in 2008 for a new career in professional wrestling. He made his debut for the promotion against Katsumasa Inoue on June 27, 2008. Okabayashi joined the promotion's non-deathmatch division, Strong BJ, eventually becoming one of its cornerstones alongside the likes of Daisuke Sekimoto and Yoshihito Sasaki. Four months after his debut, Okabayashi made his American debut, when he, along with several other BJW wrestlers, took part in the Global Gauntlet events held by the Chikara promotion.

Back in BJW, Okabayashi formed a tag team with Daisuke Sekimoto, which led to him winning his first title on July 27, 2009, when the two defeated Isami Kodaka and Masashi Takeda for the BJW Tag Team Championship. After a five-month reign, they lost the title to Shinya Ishikawa and Yoshihito Sasaki. On January 9, 2010, Okabayashi made his debut for Osaka Pro Wrestling, when he and Sekimoto unsuccessfully challenged Hideyoshi and Masamune for the Osaka Pro Wrestling Tag Team Championship. The following April, Okabayashi returned to Chikara to represent BJW in the 2010 King of Trios tournament, where he formed a trio with Sekimoto and Kankuro Hoshino. They made it to the semifinals, before being eliminated by Bruderschaft des Kreuzes (Ares, Claudio Castagnoli and Tursas). At the end of 2010, Tokyo Sports named Okabayashi Japanese professional wrestling's Rookie of the Year.

The following year, Okabayashi and Sekimoto began making appearances for All Japan Pro Wrestling (AJPW), where they won the All Asia Tag Team Championship twice. During the year, they also won the Big Japan Tag League. At the end of the year, Tokyo Sports named Okabayashi and Sekimoto the 2011 Tag Team of the Year. During 2012, Okabayashi set his sights on the BJW World Strong Heavyweight Championship, a new title intended for the Strong BJ division. He received his first shot at the title on June 21, but was defeated by Yoshihito Sasaki. The following month, Okabayashi regained the BJW Tag Team Championship, this time teaming with Shinobu. After a four-month reign, they lost the title to Isami Kodaka and Yuko Miyamoto in the finals of the 2012 Big Japan Tag League. On March 31, 2013, Okabayashi received another shot at the BJW World Strong Heavyweight Championship, unsuccessfully challenging longtime tag team partner Daisuke Sekimoto.

Okabayashi missed most of 2014 with a left shoulder injury, which he suffered while wrestling in Germany in January. He returned from the injury on December 21. His first big match since his return took place on February 2, 2015, when he unsuccessfully challenged Shuji Ishikawa for the BJW World Strong Heavyweight Championship. On February 15, Okabayashi and Sekimoto won another tag team title, when they defeated Konosuke Takeshita and Tetsuya Endo to win the DDT Pro-Wrestling promotion's KO-D Tag Team Championship. On July 20, Okabayashi scored his first-ever win over Sekimoto, when he defeated him to become the new BJW World Strong Heavyweight Champion, winning the first singles title of his professional wrestling career. On August 23, Okabayashi and Sasaki lost the KO-D Tag Team Championship to Daisuke Sasaki and Kota Ibushi. On October 29, Okabayashi and Sekimoto defeated Kohei Sato and Shuji Ishikawa in the finals to win the 2015 Saikyo Tag League and the BJW Tag Team Championship. They lost the title to Hideyoshi Kamitani and Ryota Hama on December 30. On June 8, 2016, Okabayashi won another tag team title, when he and Yasufumi Nakanoue defeated Kazma Sakamoto and Yuji Hino for the Wrestle-1 Tag Team Championship. A week later, Okabayashi and Daisuke Sekimoto defeated Bodyguard and Zeus to win AJPW's World Tag Team Championship. On July 24, Okabayashi lost the BJW World Strong Heavyweight Championship to Hideyoshi Kamitani in his fourth defense. On July 29, Okabayashi and Nakanoue lost the Wrestle-1 Tag Team Championship to Jun Kasai and Manabu Soya in their second defense. On October 31, Okabayashi and Sekimoto defeated Isami Kodaka and Yuko Miyamoto to win their second Big Japan Saikyo Tag League in a row. On November 27, Okabayashi and Sekimoto lost the AJPW World Tag Team Championship back to Bodyguard and Zeus. On December 14, Okabayashi and Sekimoto won their second Tag Team of the Year award from Tokyo Sports. On January 2, 2017, Okabayashi and Sekimoto defeated Kohei Sato and Shuji Ishikawa to win the BJW Tag Team Championship for the third time. They lost the title to Abdullah Kobayashi and Ryuji Ito in their fifth defense on July 17. On August 27, Okabayashi and Sekimoto defeated Kai and Naoya Nomura to win the vacant AJPW World Tag Team Championship for the second time. They relinquished the title on October 16 after Okabayashi suffered a shoulder injury. It was later announced that Okabayashi would be undergoing surgery the following December, which would sideline him for up to a year.

In October 2018, BJW announced that Okabayashi would be returning from injury at Ryōgokutan 2018. On November 11, he lost Ryuichi Kawakami in his return match. On December 9, Okabayashi and Sekimoto unsuccessfully challenged Ryota Hama and Yasufumi Nakanoue for the BJW Tag Team Championship. On January 13, 2019, they won the AJPW World Tag Team Championships for a third time, defeating Shuji Ishikawa and Suwama. They defended their titles against Jake Lee and Ryoji Sai on February 24 before losing the titles back to Ishikawa and Suwama on March 19. In April, Okabayashi won a tournament to determine the number one contender for the BJW World Strong Heavyweight Championship by defeating Daichi Hashimoto in the finals on April 14. On May 5, for a second time, he defeated Sekimoto to win the BJW World Strong Heavyweight Championship. He lost the title to Kohei Sato on August 25 after two title defences. In November, he won the Zero1 Furinkazan Tag Tournament with Yuji Hino and the BJW Saikyo Tag League with Shigehiro Irie. On January 1, 2020, he unsuccessfully challenged Hino for the Zero1 World Heavyweight Championship. The following day, he also unsuccessfully challenged Daichi Hashimoto for the BJW World Strong Heavyweight Championship. On January 13, he won the World Is Not Enough ~ Six Man Tag Team Tournament with Hino and Akira Hyodo. On March 3, Okabayashi and Irie unsuccessfully challenged Sekimoto and Sato for the BJW Tag Team Championship. On March 25, he won the 2AW Openweight Championship from Shu Asakawa. Also in March, Okabayashi had been entered into the 2020 Ikkitousen Strong Climb as part of the C Block; however, due to the COVID-19 pandemic, several events scheduled to showcase the Ikkitousen Strong Climb were cancelled and all remaining matches were adjudged as draws, causing Okabayashi to miss out on the finals. On July 5, he lost the 2AW Openweight Championship to Ayato Yoshida. On October 21, Okabayashi won his third BJW World Strong Heavyweight Championship by defeating Daichi Hashimoto. He lost the title to Yasufumi Nakanoue on January 2.

== Personal life ==
Okabayashi married his partner of two years, Mika Mukai, in July 2012.

== Championships and accomplishments ==
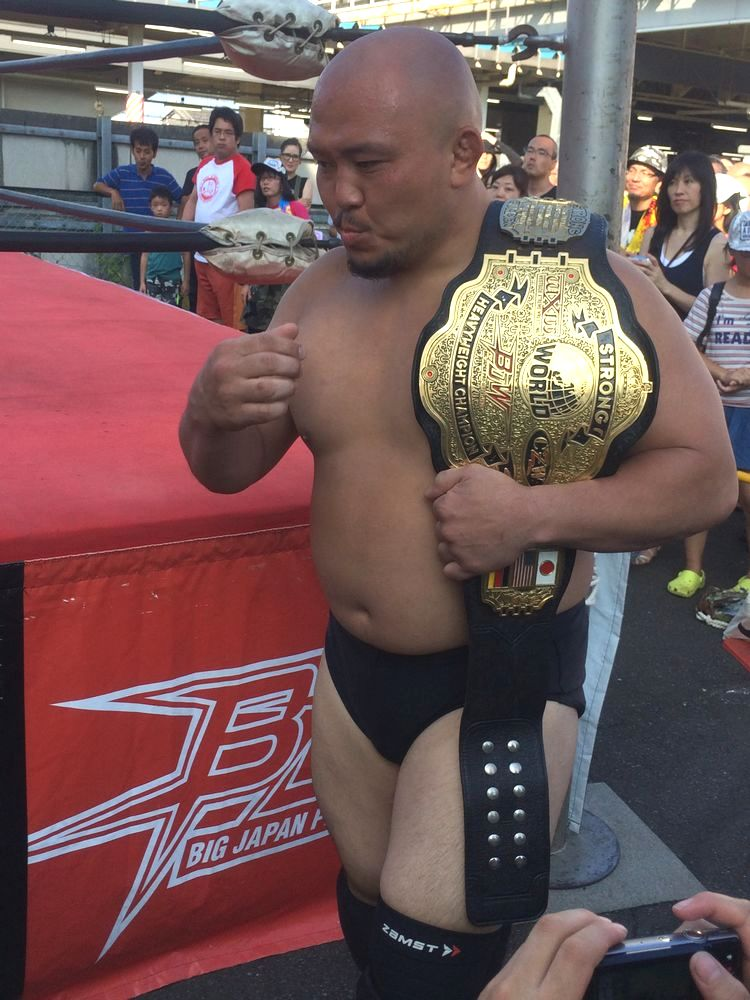
Okabayashi as the BJW World Strong Heavyweight Champion in August 2015

- Active Advance Pro Wrestling
  - 2AW Openweight Championship (1 time)
- All Japan Pro Wrestling
  - All Asia Tag Team Championship (2 times) – with Daisuke Sekimoto
  - World Tag Team Championship (3 times) – with Daisuke Sekimoto
- Big Japan Pro Wrestling
  - BJW Tag Team Championship (6 times) – with Daisuke Sekimoto (5 times) and Shinobu (1)
  - BJW World Strong Heavyweight Championship (4 times)
  - Yokohama Shopping Street 6-Man Tag Team Championship (2 times) – with Kazuki Hashimoto and Takumi Tsukamoto (1) and Ryuichi Kawakami and Shinya Ishikawa (1)
  - 8-Man 1 Day Tournament (2009) – with Daisuke Sekimoto, Shinya Ishikawa and Yoshihito Sasaki
  - Dainichi-X (2011) – with Abdullah Kobayashi
  - D-Dash Tag Tournament (2009) – with Atsushi Ohashi
  - Saikyo Tag League (2011, 2015, 2016) – with Daisuke Sekimoto
  - Saikyo Tag League (2019) - with Shigehiro Irie
  - World Is Not Enough Six Man Tag Team Tournament (2020) – with Akira Hyodo and Yuji Hino
- DDT Pro-Wrestling
  - KO-D Tag Team Championship (2 times) – with Daisuke Sekimoto (1) and Harashima (1)
- Japan Indie Awards
  - Best Bout Award (2015) vs. Daisuke Sekimoto on July 20
  - MVP Award (2015)
- Pro Wrestling Illustrated
  - Ranked No. 60 of the top 500 singles wrestlers in the PWI 500 in 2016
- Pro Wrestling Zero1
  - Furinkazan (2019) – with Yuji Hino
- Tokyo Sports
  - Best Tag Team Award (2011, 2016) – with Daisuke Sekimoto
  - Fighting Spirit Award (2015)
  - Newcomer Award (2010)
- Toshikoshi Puroresu
  - Toshiwasure! Shuffle Tag Tournament (2020) – with Harashima
- Wrestle-1
  - Wrestle-1 Tag Team Championship (1 time) – with Yasufumi Nakanoue
