= Kazma Sakamoto =

Japanese wrestler and manager

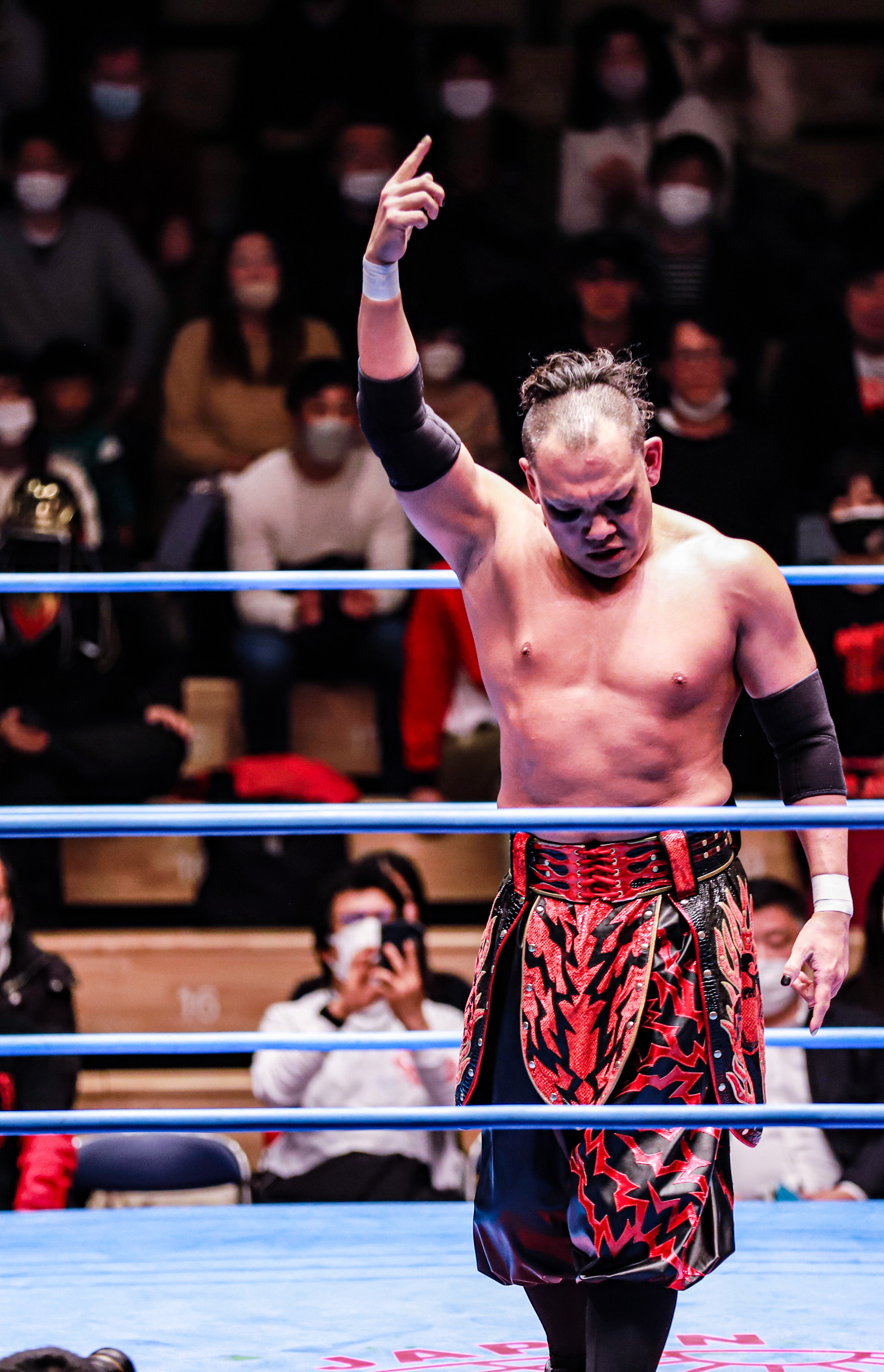
- Sakamoto in March 2023

Personal information
- Born: Kazma Sakamoto; 1 October 1982 (age 44) Tokyo, Japan

Professional wrestling career
- Ring name(s): Kazma; Kazma Sakamoto; Sakamoto
- Billed height: 6 ft 1 in (1.85 m)
- Billed weight: 231 lb (105 kg)
- Billed from: Japan
- Trained by: Taka Michinoku; Florida Championship Wrestling
- Debut: 3 May 2003

Kazma Sakamoto (born 1 October 1982) is a Japanese professional wrestler.

He originally started his career working for Kaientai Dojo in Japan, where he became a one-time Strongest-K Champion and a three-time Strongest-K Tag Team Champion alongside Ryota Chikuzen, Kengo Mashimo and Miyawaki. He spent two years working for WWE, as well as for its development brands, Florida Championship Wrestling (FCW) and NXT. After his release from WWE, he returned to Japan working as a freelancer for Kaientai Dojo (K-Dojo), Pro Wrestling Zero1 (Zero1) and Wrestle-1 (W-1), the latter of which he signed for in 2015. A year later, his contract with Wrestle-1 expired, and he returned to freelancing work, later appearing for Pro Wrestling Noah (Noah), Dragon Gate (DG) and Gleat.

== Professional wrestling career ==
=== Kaientai Dojo (2003–2011) ===
Kazma was trained by Taka Michinoku at his Kaientai Dojo wrestling school and made his debut for the promotion on 3 May 2003. In 2005, Kazma took on Michinoku for the Strongest-K Championship and a few days later took part in the Strongest-K 2005 tournament and would lose both.

In 2005, under the guidance of former Far East Connection manager, 296, Kazma formed a stable along with Kengo Mashimo called Kinnoutou and started to dominate, eventually taking on Ryota Chikuzen and Kunio Toshima as well. Mashimo and Kazma were very successful as a group, Mashimo and Kazma went on an undefeated streak since the formation of Kinnoutou and did not drop a fall until well after he left the group. Mashimo and Kazma won the first Strongest-K Tag Team tournament and were crowned the first ever Strongest-K Tag Team Champions. The two began dominating the tag team scene in K-Dojo as they also won the UWA and UWF Intercontinental Tag Team championships, absorbing them into the Strongest-K Tag Team championship. When K-Dojo split its roster into two, Kazma, along with the rest of his Kinnoutou allies were drafted to GET. Early 2006 saw Mashimo and Kazma lose their first ever tag match together, losing the Strongest-K Tag Team titles in February to Makoto Oishi and Shiori Asahi. After losing, signs of friction started to grow in Kinnoutou with Kunio Toshima's sense of justice saving Michinoku from a Kinnoutou attack.

In the beginning of 2007, Kazma began teaming up with Michinoku and together participated in Strongest-K Tag League 2007 and reached the finals before they were eliminated by Makoto Oishi and Shiori Asahi. In March, Kazma defeated Miyawaki to become the number one contender for the Strongest-K Championship and a month later took on former Kinnotou member Kengo Mashimo for the championship and lost. Kazma teamed up with Ryota Chikuzen to take on Miyawaki and Yoshiya for the Strongest-K Tag Team Championship and lost. In summer 2007, Kazma participated in Strongest-K Tournament 2007 and reached the semifinals before being knocked out of the competition. On 4 September 2007, Kazma and Chikuzen defeated Miyawaki and Naoki Tanizaki to become the Strongest-K Tag Team Champions and held the titles for about a month before losing them to Mashimo and Madoka. Kazma, Kengo Mashimo and Ryota Chikuzen teamed up to defeat Joe, Michinoku and Taishi Takizawa in Chikuzen's K-Dojo retirement match and with Chikuzen leaving, Kinnotou was no more.

In the beginning of 2008, Kazma teamed up with Takizawa and lost in the first round of the Kaientai Dojo Tag League 2008. With this loss Kazma teamed up with Yuji Hino to take part in the same tournament and reached the final before being eliminated by Mashimo and Madoka. After the tournament, Kazma joined the stable OMEGA and for most of the first part of 2008 teamed up with members of OMEGA to take part in tag team matches against rivals Handsome and Slum. On 20 June 2008, Kazma and Miyawaki defeated Handsome members, Joe and Michinoku, for the Strongest-K Championship. After winning the championships, Kazma participated in the Strongest-K Tournament 2008 and in the first round, Michinoku would get his revenge by knocking Kazma out of the competition. In August, Kazma and Miyawaki lost the tag team championship to the former champions. He would eventually leave the stable to form a new one with former Kinnotou member, Mashimo.

Along with Kazma and Mashimo, Kaji Yamato, Daigoro Kashiwa and Hiro Tonai were also part of Monster Plant. For most of 2009, Kazma would take on members of other stables and factions in both singles and tag team match ups. In the Strongest-K Tournament 2009 he would lose to Daigoro Kashiwa in the semifinals. Kazma would take part in two tournaments in quick succession, the first being a one-day three-way tournament, which was won by Hino, and Strongest-K Tournament 2009, where he was eliminated by Kashiwa in the semifinals. On 17 October 2009, Kazma finally defeated Michinoku to become Strongest-K Champion. He went on to team up with Tonai in the Kaientai Dojo Tag League 2010 and earned four points which two other teams in block A had also and therefore took part in a decision three-way won by Asahi and Hino. Throughout 2009 and 2010 Kazma would defend his championship on multiple occasions and always retaining it until 15 August 2010, where he lost it to Hino. With the loss of his title Monster Plant would disintegrate, leaving Kazma on his own.

With no stable or faction Kazma would be alone and his prospects would suffer as a result. Throughout 2011, Kazma had multiple opportunities to become a champion or the number one contender and lost all of them. Kazma and Harashima would lose to Hiroki and Mashimo for the Strongest-K Tag Team Championship. Kazma also lost his rematch for the Strongest-K Championship. In the summer of 2011, he participated in number one contendership for the Strongest-K Championship in battle royals and other types of match ups. In the Strongest-K tournament Kazma would gain a total of six points in block B which was not enough to progress to the semifinals. Kazma's last match for Kaientai Dojo came on 10 September 2011, he teamed with Asahi and lost to Tonai and Takizawa.

=== WWE (2011–2013) ===
In the summer of 2011, he went on an excursion to North America and was subsequently signed to a developmental contract by WWE and assigned to their developmental territory Florida Championship Wrestling under the name Sakamoto. Sakamoto made his FCW debut on 4 December 2011 alongside fellow K-Dojo alum Jiro in a loss against the team of Big E Langston and Nick Rogers. Sakamoto went on to lose every televised FCW match he participated in, including defeats to Dean Ambrose and Mike Dalton.

On 26 March 2012, Sakamoto made his first appearance on WWE television in a vignette for the re-debuting Lord Tensai. Sakamoto made his debut on the 2 April 2012 episode of Raw as the follower of Tensai. Sakamoto would aid Tensai by interfering in his matches and attacking his adversaries. From June, with Tensai losing more frequently, he would often vent his frustrations by abusing and attacking Sakamoto, who would remain loyal to his master. By September, Tensai stopped appearing with Sakamoto, who disappeared from television.

Following his disassociation from Tensai, Sakamoto returned to WWE's developmental territory, the former FCW, which had been rebranded into NXT; he made his NXT debut on the 16 January 2013 episode, losing to Adrian Neville. While facing Briley Pierce on the 8 May episode of NXT, both men were attacked by Conor O'Brian; this led to both men challenging O'Brian to a handicap match during the next episode, which O'Brian won. On 17 May 2013, Sakamoto was released; his last match was a battle royal on the 29 May episode of NXT (which was taped before his release) to determine the #1 contender for the NXT Championship where he and Pierce were the first men eliminated from the match courtesy of Mason Ryan.

=== Return to Japan (2013–present) ===
On 11 June 2013, Kazma, billed under the ring name Kazma Sakamoto, returned to Japan at a Pro Wrestling Zero1 event, where he announced that he would be taking part in the 2013 Fire Festival. On 15 July, Sakamoto wrestled his first match since his WWE release, when he defeated Tank Nagai at a Kaientai Dojo event. Sakamoto finished his Fire Festival on 4 August with a record of two wins, one draw and two losses, failing to advance to the finals of the tournament. On 15 September, Sakamoto made his debut for Wrestle-1, teaming with Ryoji Sai in a tag team match, where they defeated Ryota Hama and Yasufumi Nakanoue. Sakamoto replaced an injured Kohei Sato as a member of a heel stable named Desperado, led by Masayuki Kono, and later in the event helped Kono defeat Masakatsu Funaki. Back in Kaientai Dojo the following day, Sakamoto and Kengo Mashimo defeated Daigoro Kashiwa and Ricky Fuji to win the Strongest-K Tag Team Championship. They lost the title in their first defense on 10 November to the team of Kaji Tomato and Taka Michinoku. On 11 January 2014, Sakamoto made his debut for Wrestling New Classic (WNC), defeating Masaya Takahashi, after which he challenged and attacked WNC Champion Tajiri. This led to a title match between the two on 30 January, where Tajiri retained his title. Through Wrestle-1's working relationship with American promotion Total Nonstop Action Wrestling (TNA), Sakamoto worked TNA's Bound for Glory event in Tokyo on 12 October, losing to MVP. On 30 January 2015, Sakamoto received his first title shot in Wrestle-1, when he and Desperado's newest member Koji Doi unsuccessfully challenged Kaz Hayashi and Shuji Kondo for the Wrestle-1 Tag Team Championship. On 26 June 2015, it was announced that Sakamoto had signed with Wrestle-1, officially ending his days as a freelancer. Shortly afterwards, Sakamoto became the new leader of Desperado, after kicking Kono out of the group. Under the new leadership, the stable was renamed "Real Desperado" on 13 October. On 3 November, Sakamoto, Koji Doi and Nosawa Rongai defeated Jackets (Jiro Kuroshio, Seiki Yoshioka and Yasufumi Nakanoue) for the UWA World Trios Championship. They lost the title back to Jackets on 27 November. On 6 March 2016, Sakamoto and Real Desperado's newest member Yuji Hino defeated Masayuki Kono and Shuji Kondo for the Wrestle-1 Tag Team Championship. They lost the title to Yasufumi Nakanoue and Yuji Okabayashi on 8 June. On 31 August, Sakamoto's contract with Wrestle-1 expired and he became a freelancer once again.

== Other media ==
Sakamoto appeared on the 81st episode of Zack Ryder's YouTube show, Z! True Long Island Story, in a segment called "Where's Trent?".

== Championships and accomplishments ==
- Dragon Gate
  - Open the Triangle Gate Championship (3 times) – with Takashi Yoshida and Yasushi Kanda (1), Diamante and Takashi Yoshida (1), and SB Kento and Takashi Yoshida (1)
  - Open the Twin Gate Championship (2 times) – with B×B Hulk (1) and Kaito Ishida (1)
- Ganbare☆Pro-Wrestling
  - World's Strongest Ganbare Tag Tournament (2017) – with Kenso Ohka
- Gleat
  - G-Infinity Championship (2 times, inaugural) – with Ryuichi Kawakami (1, inaugural) and Kaito Ishida (1)
  - G-Infinity Title First Champion Decision Tournament (2022) – with Ryuichi Kawakami
  - G-Infinity Title Tournament (2025) – with Kaito Ishida
- Kaientai Dojo
  - Strongest-K Championship (1 time)
  - Strongest-K Tag Team Championship (4 times) – with Kengo Mashimo (2), Ryota Chikuzen (1) and Miyawaki (1)
  - UWA/UWF Intercontinental Tag Team Championship (1 time, final) – with Kengo Mashimo
  - Strongest-K Tag Team Tournament (2005) – with Kengo Mashimo
  - Tag Team Match of the Year (2013) – with Kengo Mashimo vs. Kaji Tomato and Taka Michinoku on 10 November
- Pro Wrestling Noah
  - GHC Tag Team Championship (1 time) – with Takashi Sugiura
  - Global Tag League (2019) – with Takashi Sugiura
- Pro Wrestling Society
  - PWS Losers Weight Championship (1 time)
- Wrestle-1
  - UWA World Trios Championship (1 time) – with Koji Doi and Nosawa Rongai
  - Wrestle-1 Tag Team Championship (1 time) – with Yuji Hino
