= Noah The New Year 2023 =

2023 Pro Wrestling Noah event

NOAH The New Year 2023
- Promotional poster featuring Kaito Kiyomiya and Kenoh
- Promotion: CyberFight
- Brand(s): Pro Wrestling Noah
- Date: January 1, 2023
- City: Tokyo, Japan
- Venue: Nippon Budokan
- Attendance: 9,500

Pay-per-view chronology
← Previous; N Innovation	Next → The Great Muta Final "Bye-Bye"

Noah The New Year chronology
← Previous; 2022	Next → 2024

NOAH The New Year 2023 was a professional wrestling event promoted by CyberFight's sub-brand Pro Wrestling Noah. It took place on January 1, 2023, in Tokyo, Japan, at the Nippon Budokan. The event aired on CyberAgent's AbemaTV online linear television service and CyberFight's streaming service Wrestle Universe. It was the first pay-per-view promoted by Noah in 2023.

Eleven matches were contested at the event, and four of Noah's five championships were on the line. This event was notable for the appearance of WWE's Shinsuke Nakamura of the SmackDown brand division who had defeated The Great Muta in his final singles match.

== Background ==
=== Storylines ===
The event featured eleven professional wrestling matches that resulted from scripted storylines, where wrestlers portrayed villains, heroes, or less distinguishable characters in the scripted events that built tension and culminated in a wrestling match or series of matches.

== Event ==
=== Preliminary matches ===
The show started with the confrontation between Yasutaka Yano and Taishi Ozawa which ended with the latter's victory. In the second bout, Daiki Inaba, Masa Kitamiya, and Yoshiki Inamura picked up a victory over Akitoshi Saito, Muhammad Yone, and Shuhei Taniguchi. Next, Alejandro, Dante Leon and Ninja Mack defeated Kongo (Hi69, Shuji Kondo and Tadasuke). The fourth match saw Dragon Gate's Masaaki Mochizuki, Susumu Mochizuki and Mochizuki Jr. picking up a voctory over El Hijo del Dr. Wagner Jr. and Stinger's Atsushi Kotoge and Seiki Yoshioka. Next, another loss of Kongo's stable was represented by Katsuhiko Nakajima, Masakatsu Funaki, Manabu Soya and Hajime Ohara in front of Kazuyuki Fujita, Kendo Kashin, Nosawa Rongai and Hiroshi Hase, where Hase was revealed as the mystery partner. The sixth match saw Jack Morris defeating Timothy Thatcher. After the match concluded, Jake Lee appeared and aligned himself with Morris. Next, Amakusa secured his first defense of the GHC Junior Heavyweight Championship against Junta Miyawaki. Later on, Takashi Sugiura and Satoshi Kojima secured their third defense of the GHC Tag Team Championship against New Japan Pro Wrestling's Kenta and Naomichi Marufuji. In the eighth bout, Yoshinari Ogawa and Los Perros del Mal de Japón's Eita defeated Yo-Hey and Kzy to win the GHC Junior Heavyweight Tag Team Championship. In the semi main event, Kaito Kiyomiya secured the third defense of the GHC Heavyweight Championship against Kenoh.

=== Main event ===
The show's main event portrayed the final Noah appearance of The Great Muta before his retirement ceremony which occurred on February 21, 2023. He faced WWE's Shinsuke Nakamura in a losing effort which concluded in little over eighteen minutes. The match ended after a "green mist" and a Kinshasa. After the match, Nakamura helped Muta up, showing a sign of respect and sportsmanship.

== Results ==
No.	Results	Stipulations	Times
1	Yasutaka Yano defeated Taishi Ozawa by pinfall	Singles match	4:01
2	Daiki Inaba, Masa Kitamiya, and Yoshiki Inamura defeated Akitoshi Saito, Muhammad Yone, and Shuhei Taniguchi by pinfall	Six-man tag team match	8:48
3	Alejandro, Dante Leon and Ninja Mack defeated Kongo (Hi69, Shuji Kondo and Tadasuke) by pinfall	Six-man tag team match	8:11
4	M3K (Masaaki Mochizuki, Susumu Mochizuki and Mochizuki Jr.) defeated El Hijo del Dr. Wagner Jr., Atsushi Kotoge and Seiki Yoshioka by pinfall	Six-man tag team match	10:27
5	Sugiura-gun (Kazuyuki Fujita and Kendo Kashin), Nosawa Rongai and Hiroshi Hase defeated Kongo (Katsuhiko Nakajima, Masakatsu Funaki, Manabu Soya and Hajime Ohara) by pinfall	Eight-man tag team match	16:36
6	Jack Morris defeated Timothy Thatcher by pinfall	Singles match	12:16
7	Amakusa (c) defeated Junta Miyawaki by pinfall	Singles match for the GHC Junior Heavyweight Championship	15:00
8	TakaKoji (Takashi Sugiura and Satoshi Kojima) (c) defeated Kenta and Naomichi Marufuji by pinfall	Tag team match for the GHC Tag Team Championship	18:40
9	Yoshinari Ogawa and Eita defeated Yo-Hey and Kzy (c) by pinfall	Tag team match for the GHC Junior Heavyweight Tag Team Championship	19:17
10	Kaito Kiyomiya (c) defeated Kenoh by pinfall	Singles match for the GHC Heavyweight Championship	19:23
11	Shinsuke Nakamura defeated The Great Muta by pinfall	Singles match	18:19
(c) / – the champion(s) heading into the match
