= Wrestle-1 Grand Prix =

Professional wrestling tournament

Wrestle-1 Grand Prix was a professional wrestling tournament run by the Wrestle-1 promotion in Japan. It was inaugurated in 2015.

The tournament takes its name from a similar tournament done by the Wrestle-1 joint venture cards in 2005; however that tournament never finished, as the promotion broke up in October 2 of that year, before the semifinals could take place.

== Results ==
=== List of winners ===
- 2015: Manabu Soya
- 2016: Manabu Soya
- 2017: Jiro Kuroshio
- 2018: Shotaro Ashino
- 2019: Daiki Inaba

=== 2015 ===
The 2015 Wrestle-1 Grand Prix, was held from held from August 2 to August 30. The tournament featured 21-man single-elimination tournament The first two rounds were held on individual nights, with round one and The winner of the tournament get a shot for The Wrestle-1 Championship.

First round (August 2)
Kazma Sakamoto	Pin
Jay Freddie	6:26
Akira	Pin
Kaz Hayashi	8:13
Mazada	Pin
Hiroki Murase	8:43
Minoru Tanaka	Sub
Andy Wu	9:00
Yasufumi Nakanoue	Pin
Jiro Kuroshio	13:51
Masayuki Kono	Pin
Koji Doi	6:05
Kumagoro	Pin
Ryota Hama	1:38
Shotaro Ashino	Pin
Nosawa Rongai	7:52

Second round (August 2)
Kazma Sakamoto	Bye
Hiroshi Yamato	Pin
Kaz Hayashi	14:20
Mazada	Pin
Shuji Kondo	13:05
Minoru Tanaka	Bye
Kai	Pin
Jiro Kuroshio	16:43
Tajiri	Pin
Koji Doi	8:22
Manabu Soya	Pin
Ryota Hama	5:30
Shotaro Ashino	Bye

Quarter-finals (August 8)
Kazma Sakamoto	Pin
Kaz Hayashi	10:15
Shuji Kondo	Pin
Minoru Tanaka	23:34
Jiro Kuroshio	Pin
Tajiri	16:13
Manabu Soya	Sub
Shotaro Ashino	11:08

Semi-finals (August 30)
Kazma Sakamoto	Pin
Shuji Kondo	10:44
Jiro Kuroshio	Pin
Manabu Soya	13:22

Final (August 30)
Shuji Kondo	Pin
Manabu Soya	20:42

=== 2016 ===
The 2016 Wrestle-1 Grand Prix is scheduled to take place between June 15 and July 1.

First round (June 15)
Manabu Soya	Pin
Kazma Sakamoto	23:10
Hiroki Murase	Sub
Daiki Inaba	6:49
Shotaro Ashino	Sub
Jiro Kuroshio	11:56
Koji Doi	Pin
Akira	9:41
Yuji Hino	Pin
Ryota Hama	10:49
Yasufumi Nakanoue	Pin
Kumagoro	5:20
Kaz Hayashi	Pin
Minoru Tanaka	3:05
Masayuki Kono	Pin
Seiki Yoshioka	8:02

Second round (June 18, 26)
Manabu Soya	Pin
Daiki Inaba	12:31
Shotaro Ashino	Sub
Akira	10:09
Yuji Hino	Pin
Yasufumi Nakanoue	9:14
Kaz Hayashi	Pin
Masayuki Kono	8:09

Semifinals (July 1)
Manabu Soya	TKO
Shotaro Ashino	0:27
Yuji Hino	Pin
Kaz Hayashi	5:16

Final (July 1)
Manabu Soya	Pin
Yuji Hino	15:00

=== 2017 ===
The 2017 Wrestle-1 Grand Prix took place on July 12.

First round
Masayuki Kono	Pin
Daiki Inaba	3:44
Shuji Kondo	Pin
Takanori Ito	6:05
Manabu Soya	Pin
Kumagoro	6:15
Jiro Kuroshio	Pin
Koji Doi	6:01

Semifinals
Masayuki Kono	Sub
Takanori Ito	4:49
Manabu Soya	Pin
Jiro Kuroshio	7:41

Final
Masayuki Kono	Pin
Jiro Kuroshio	15:30

=== 2018 ===
The 2018 Wrestle-1 Grand Prix took place on July 1 and July 18.

First round
Kuma Arashi	Pin
Takanori Ito	11:07
Shuji Kondo	Pin
Koji Doi	11:07
Shotaro Ashino	Pin
Kaz Hayashi	11:57
Jiro Kuroshio	Pin
Masayuki Kono	13:24

Semifinals
Kuma Arashi	Sub
Koji Doi	7:03
Shotaro Ashino	Pin
Jiro Kuroshio	14:04

Final
Koji Doi	Pin
Shotaro Ashino	21:30

=== 2019 ===
The 2019 Wrestle-1 Grand Prix took place on June 2 and July 2.

First round
Kuma Arashi	Pin
Pegaso Illuminar	8:05
Masayuki Kono	Sub
Daiki Inaba	9:32
Shotaro Ashino	Sub
Seigo Tachibana	15:35
Koji Doi	Pin
Manabu Soya	16:07

Semifinals
Kuma Arashi	Sub
Daiki Inaba	11:39
Shotaro Ashino	Sub
Koji Doi	14:37

Final
Daiki Inaba	Sub
Shotaro Ashino	22:05

== See also ==
- New Japan Cup
- Ōdō Tournament
