= Noah The New Year 2022 =

2022 Pro Wrestling Noah event

- Promotional poster featuring Kaito Kiyomiya, Go Shiozaki, Katsuhiko Nakajima, Kenoh and Hayata
- Promotion: CyberFight
- Brand: Pro Wrestling Noah
- Date: January 1, 2022
- City: Tokyo, Japan
- Venue: Nippon Budokan
- Attendance: 3,181

Pay-per-view chronology
← Previous; The Best 2021	Next → Bumper Crop 2022 in Sendai

Noah The New Year chronology
← Previous; 2021	Next → 2023

Noah The New Year 2022 was a professional wrestling event promoted by CyberFight's sub-brand Pro Wrestling Noah. It took place on January 1, 2022, in Tokyo, Japan, at the Nippon Budokan. The event aired on CyberAgent's AbemaTV online linear television service and CyberFight's streaming service Wrestle Universe. It was the first pay-per-view promoted by Noah in 2022.

The event featured ten matches with four of Noah's championships on the line. The main event saw Katsuhiko Nakajima defeat Go Shiozaki to retain the GHC Heavyweight Championship. Other top matches included Kenoh successfully defending the GHC National Championship against Kaito Kiyomiya, Keiji Muto and Naomichi Marufuji defeated M's Alliance stablemates Masaaki Mochizuki and Masato Tanaka to retain the GHC Tag Team Championship, and Hayata defeated Yoshinari Ogawa to retain the GHC Junior Heavyweight Championship.

== Background ==
The event featured ten professional wrestling matches that resulted from scripted storylines, where wrestlers portrayed villains, heroes, or less distinguishable characters in the scripted events that built tension and culminated in a wrestling match or series of matches. The official theme song for the event was "Voyage" by Funky Kato.

== Event ==
=== Preliminary matches ===
The event started with the confrontation between the teams of Junta Miyawaki and Kinya Okada, and Kai Fujimura and Yasutaka Yano which solded with the victory of the preceding team. In the second bout, Funky Express (Akitoshi Saito, King Tany and Mohammed Yone) defeated Kongo (Manabu Soya, Nio and Tadasuke) in six-man tag team action. Next, Kongo (Aleja and Hao) outmatched the team of Stinger (Seiki Yoshioka and Yuya Susumu). The fourth bout saw Hajime Ohara, Momo No Seishun Tag (Atsushi Kotoge and Daisuke Harada) and Último Dragón picking a victory over Los Perros del Mal de Japón (Eita, Kotaro Suzuki, Nosawa Rongai and Yo-Hey) in eight-man tag team action. Next up, Kazuyuki Fujita and Kendo Kashin defeated Ikuto Hidaka and Masakatsu Funaki. In the sixth match, Hayata secured the eighth consecutive defense of the GHC Junior Heavyweight Championship against Stinger stablemate Yoshinari Ogawa. In the seventh match, Keiji Muto and Naomichi Marufuji defended the GHC Tag Team Championship for the first time against M's Alliance stablemates Masaaki Mochizuki and Masato Tanaka. Next up, Kenta and Sugiura-gun (Kazushi Sakuraba and Takashi Sugiura) defeated Daiki Inaba, Masa Kitamiya and Yoshiki Inamura. In the semi main event, Kenoh secured the second consecutive defense of the GHC National Championship against Kaito Kiyomiya.

=== Main event ===
In the main event, Katsuhiko Nakajima defeated Go Shiozaki to mark his third consecutive defense of the GHC Heavyweight Championship.

== Results ==
No.	Results	Stipulations	Times
1	Junta Miyawaki and Kinya Okada defeated Kai Fujimura and Yasutaka Yano by pinfall	Tag team match	8:39
2	Funky Express (Akitoshi Saito, King Tany and Mohammed Yone) defeated Kongo (Manabu Soya, Nio and Tadasuke) by pinfall	Six-man tag team match	8:45
3	Kongo (Aleja and Hao) defeated Stinger (Seiki Yoshioka and Yuya Susumu) by pinfall	Tag team match	11:44
4	Hajime Ohara, Momo No Seishun Tag (Atsushi Kotoge and Daisuke Harada) and Último Dragón defeated Los Perros del Mal de Japón (Eita, Kotaro Suzuki, Nosawa Rongai and Yo-Hey) by pinfall	Eight-man tag team match	13:51
5	Sugiura-gun (Kazuyuki Fujita and Kendo Kashin) defeated Ikuto Hidaka and Masakatsu Funaki by pinfall	Tag team match	12:17
6	Hayata (c) defeated Yoshinari Ogawa by pinfall	Singles match for the GHC Junior Heavyweight Championship	20:54
7	M's Alliance (Keiji Muto and Naomichi Marufuji) (c) defeated M's Alliance (Masaaki Mochizuki and Masato Tanaka) by pinfall	Tag team match for the GHC Tag Team Championship	20:50
8	Kenta and Sugiura-gun (Kazushi Sakuraba and Takashi Sugiura) defeated Daiki Inaba, Masa Kitamiya and Yoshiki Inamura by pinfall	Six-man tag team match	25:46
9	Kenoh (c) defeated Kaito Kiyomiya by referee's decision	Singles match for the GHC National Championship	24:42
10	Katsuhiko Nakajima (c) defeated Go Shiozaki by pinfall	Singles match for the GHC Heavyweight Championship	30:10
(c) / – the champion(s) heading into the match
