= Yuji Hino =

Japanese wrestler

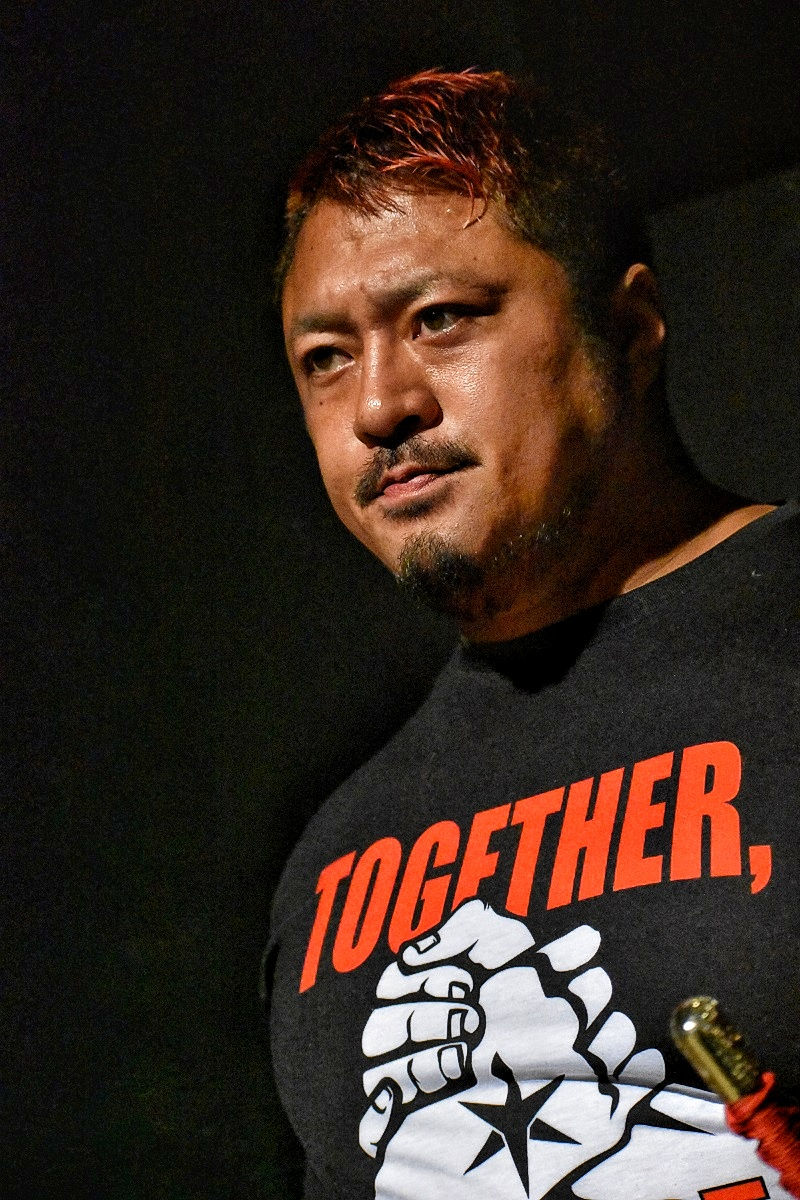
- Hino in October 2019

Personal information
- Born: Yusuke Hino (日野 裕介, Hino Yūsuke); January 27, 1985 (age 41) Hirakata, Osaka

Professional wrestling career
- Ring name(s): Bane Hino; Hi no Keshin; Hino X Yosuke Nomoto; Yuji Hino; Yusuke Hinomoto
- Billed height: 1.78 m (5 ft 10 in)
- Billed weight: 110 kg (243 lb)
- Trained by: Taka Michinoku
- Debut: November 23, 2003

Yusuke Hino (日野 裕介, Hino Yūsuke; born January 27, 1985), better known by the ring name Yuji Hino (火野 裕士, Hino Yūji), is a Japanese professional wrestler, He is currently competing as a freelancer on the Japanese independent circuit. One of the most well-travelled heavyweights in Japan, Hino was trained by Taka Michinoku and made his debut for his Kaientai Dojo (K-Dojo) promotion in November 2003, becoming a four-time Strongest-K Champion and a four-time Strongest-K Tag Team Champion, before leaving the promotion in October 2015. He has also wrestled extensively for DDT Pro-Wrestling (DDT) and Wrestle-1 (W-1), where he is a former one-time KO-D Openweight Champion, a two-time KO-D Tag Team Champion and a two-time KO-D 6-Man Tag Team Champion, as well as a former Wrestle-1 Champion and Wrestle-1 Tag Team Champion.

== Professional wrestling career ==
=== Kaientai Dojo (2003–2015) ===
Trained by Taka Michinoku, Hino made his professional wrestling debut for Michinoku's Kaientai Dojo (K-Dojo) promotion on November 23, 2003, teaming with Joe Aoyama and Ryota Chikuzen in a six-man tag team match, where they were defeated by Michinoku, Hi69 and Kazma. Hino wrestled several opening matches during the rest of the year, most notably having a trilogy of matches with Yasu Urano in December, but, as is customary for a rookie in Japanese professional wrestling, lost all of his matches. Hino finally picked up his first win on January 10, 2004, defeating Romy Suzuki. Hino started picking up wins more regularly the following July. On July 19, Hino entered the 2004 K-Metal League. Dominating his round-robin block with five wins and one loss, Hino made it to the finals of the tournament, where, on August 22, he was defeated by Shiori Asahi. On September 29, Hino received his first title opportunity, when he and Asahi unsuccessfully challenged Gentaro and Yoshiya for the UWA/UWF Intercontinental Tag Team Championship. On November 8, Hino made his debut for New Japan Pro-Wrestling, losing to Hirooki Goto. On December 12, Hino teamed with Hi69 to unsuccessfully challenge Ryota Chikuzen and Taka Michinoku for the same title. At the end of his first full year in professional wrestling, Kaientai Dojo named Hino the 2004 Newcomer of the Year.

In February 2005, Hino and his now regular tag team partner Hi69 made it to the semifinals of the Strongest-K Tag Team Tournament, before unsuccessfully challenging Kengo Mashimo and Kazma for the Strongest-K Tag Team Championship on April 3. During the summer of 2005, Hino made it to the finals of the 2005 Strongest-K Tournament, where, on August 14, he was defeated by Kengo Mashimo. Following the tournament, Hino left Hi69 to form the New Standard stable with Saburo Inematsu, Super-X and Yuu Yamagata. On July 8, 2006, Hino received his first shot at the Strongest-K Championship, but was defeated by Joe. On January 7, 2007, Hino won his first title, when he and stablemate Saburo Inematsu defeated Joe and Yasu Urano for the Strongest-K Tag Team Championship. After two successful title defenses, Hino and Inematsu lost the title to Miyawaki and Yoshiya on May 6.

On July 8, Hino turned on the New Standard and joined the villainous Omega stable by helping its members Miyawaki and Yoshiya successfully defend the Strongest-K Tag Team Championship against Kazma and Ryota Chikuzen. Omega also included Makoto Oishi and Shiori Asahi. On August 12, Hino made it to the finals of his second Strongest-K Tournament, but was again defeated there, this time by Taka Michinoku. On October 14, Hino, Asahi and Oishi won the Taj Mahal Cup Scramble 1-Day 6 Person Tag Team Tournament. Having recently gained several kilograms of muscle, Hino finally received a main event push as a member of Omega. On April 13, 2008, at ev.7, Kaientai Dojo's largest annual event, Hino defeated Kengo Mashimo in the main event to win the Strongest-K Championship for the first time. Hino made his first successful title defense on May 6, defeating former Omega stablemate Yoshiya, which was followed by another successful defense on June 12 against Madoka. On August 9, Hino lost the title back to Kengo Mashimo in his third title defense, ending his reign at 118 days. At the end of the year, the August 9 match was named Kaientai Dojo's 2008 Match of the Year. In February 2009, Hino and Saburo Inematsu made it to the finals of the Kaientai Dojo Tag League, but were there defeated by Hiro Tonai and Taishi Takizawa. On June 19, Hino defeated Kengo Mashimo and Shiori Asahi in the finals to win the 1-Day 3-Way Tournament. On November 14, Hino received a rematch for the Strongest-K Championship, but was unable to dethrone the defending champion, Kazma.

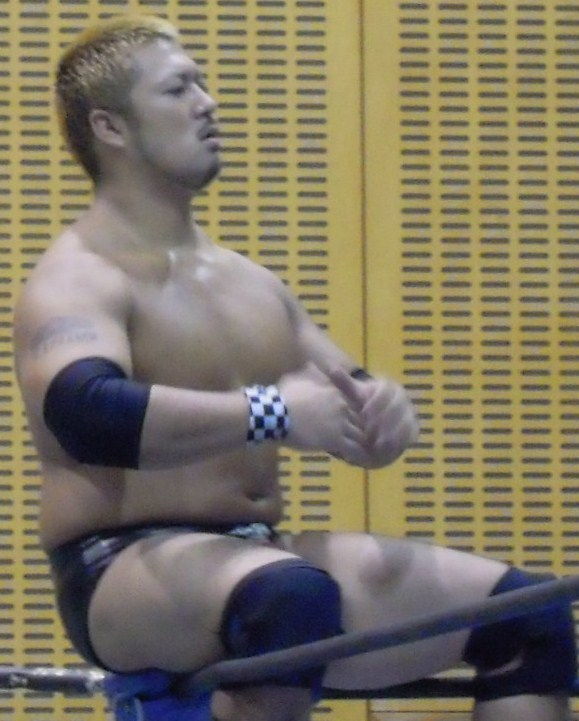
Hino in August 2010

Hino started off 2010 by teaming with Shiori Asahi to win the Kaientai Dojo Tag League, defeating the team of Daigoro Kashiwa and Kengo Mashimo in the finals. On March 17, Hino and Saburo Inematsu defeated Brahman Kei and Brahman Shu to win the WEW Hardcore Tag Team Championship. On April 2 at evolution8, Hino and Inematsu defeated Daigoro Kashiwa and Kengo Mashimo to not only successfully defend the WEW Hardcore Tag Team Championship, but to also win the Strongest-K Tag Team Championship. They would go on to lose the Strongest-K Tag Team Championship to Kaji Tomato and Taishi Takizawa on May 5. Hino's impressive 2010 continued the following summer, when, on July 11, he defeated Kengo Mashimo in the finals to win the 2010 Strongest-K Tournament. As a result, Hino was granted a shot at the Strongest-K Championship, which he went on to win, defeating Kazma on August 15. On October 17, Hino's stable Omega decided to mutually disband. On November 23, Hino made his first successful defense of the Strongest-K Championship, defeating tag team partner Saburo Inematsu. On December 25, Hino also successfully defended the title against Taishi Takizawa. The year ended with Hino being named Kaientai Dojo's 2010 Wrestler of the Year, while his title win over Kazma was ranked the Match of the Year.

After a year-long reign, Hino and Inematsu lost the WEW Hardcore Tag Team Championship to Kengo Mashimo and Ryuichi Sekine on March 20, 2011. On April 17 at evolution9, Hino made his third successful defense of the Strongest-K Championship, defeating Canadian Quiet Storm. On May 5, Hino also successfully defended the title against previous champion, Kazma, in a rematch of their match of the year. After a 307-day reign, Hino lost the Strongest-K Championship to Kengo Mashimo on June 18. On September 17, Hino, Bambi and Ricky Fuji defeated Hiro Tonai, Shiori Asahi and Yuki Sato to win the Chiba 6 Man Tag Team Championship. After three successful title defenses, they lost the title to Daigoro Kashiwa, Kaji Tomato and Marines Mask II on December 18. At the end of the year, Hino was awarded his third Match of the Year accolade for his Strongest-K Championship match against Kengo Mashimo. In early 2012, Hino began once again teaming regularly with Saburo Inematsu, which led to the two defeating Kengo Mashimo and Taka Michinoku on May 6 to win the Strongest-K Tag Team Championship for the third time. They went on to lose the title to Hiro Tonai and Shiori Asahi on June 17. On July 8, Hino wrestled in a special main event, where he was defeated by freelancer Daisuke Sekimoto.

On July 29, Hino entered a special tournament, which was set to determine a new top stable in Kaientai Dojo. In the first round of the tournament, Hino and Ayumu Honda were defeated by Shiori Asahi and Yuki Sato. As the winners of the match, Asahi and Sato were given the right to recruit one of the losers as part of their stable, and chose Hino to join them. Later that same event, Hino, Asahi and Sato were defeated in the semifinals by Hiro Tonai, Kaji Tomato and Jonathan Bada. Once again, the winners chose Hino to join their stable. In the finals, Hino, Tonai, Tomato and Bada defeated Crazy Mary, Ryuichi Sekine, Saburo Inematsu and Yoshiya to win the tournament, forming the new stable named Uchuu Puroresu Kyoukai. On October 7, Hino received a shot at the Strongest-K Championship, but his match with Daisuke Sekimoto ended in a double knockout, after neither man was able to continue. On October 14, Hino defeated Taishi Takizawa to earn another shot at Daisuke Sekimoto and the Strongest-K Championship. On November 13, Hino defeated Sekimoto in a rematch to win the Strongest-K Championship for the third time. Hino made the first successful title defense of his third reign against Shiori Asahi on December 24. That same day, Hino earned his second Wrestler of the Year award. On January 26, 2013, Hino teamed with Saburo Inematsu to unsuccessfully challenge Kengo Mashimo and Ryuichi Sekine for the Strongest-K Tag Team Championship. On April 14, Hino lost the Strongest-K Championship to Taishi Takizawa in the main event of evolution11. In September, Hino announced that he would undergo surgery on his right elbow following October 6, which would sideline him for the next few months. On October 6, Hino produced his own event, which celebrated his tenth anniversary in professional wrestling. During the event, Hino wrestled three times; first in the opening six-man tag team match, where he, Antonio Honda and Daisuke Sasaki were defeated by Hikaru Sato, Kengo Mashimo and Yukio Sakaguchi, and later in the scheduled main event, an Omega reunion match, where he, Makoto Oishi and Shiori Asahi defeated Hiroki, Ryota Chikuzen and Taka Michinoku. Following the main event, Hino also wrestled Quiet Storm to a five-minute time limit draw. Hino was expected to return for Kaientai Dojo's big New Year's Eve event, but on November 19, he announced that his surgery had not produced desired results, forcing him to remain sidelined.

Hino returned to the ring on January 26, 2014, when he teamed with Hiroki in a tag team match, where they defeated Ryuichi Sekine and Tank Nagai, pinning Sekine for the win. On February 16, Hino and Hiroki defeated Hiro Tonai and Yuki Sato in the finals to win the 2014 Bo-so Golden Tag Tournament. This led to a match on March 2, where Hino and Hiroki defeated Kaji Tomato and Taka Michinoku to win the Strongest-K Tag Team Championship. On November 3, Hino and the renamed Hi69 lost the Strongest-K Tag Team Championship to Kaji Tomato and Shiori Asahi. On April 12, 2015, Hino defeated Kengo Mashimo to win the Strongest-K Championship for the fourth time. He lost the title to Tank Nagai on September 6. On October 27, Kaientai Dojo announced Hino's resignation from the promotion. In a press conference on November 1, it was announced that Hino would continue his career as a freelancer.

=== DDT Pro-Wrestling (2009, 2011–2014) ===
On November 3, 2009, Hino made his debut for DDT Pro-Wrestling (DDT), teaming with Shiori Asahi in a tag team match, where they faced Harashima and Yukihiro Abe. On September 18, 2011, Hino returned to DDT, teaming with Ryuichi Sekine to defeat Shigehiro Irie and Soma Takao in a tag team match.

On November 27, 2011, Hino began working regularly for DDT, when he formed the Crying Wolf stable with Antonio Honda, Keita Yano and Yasu Urano. In their first match together, the four defeated Daisuke Sasaki, Masa Takanashi, Mikami and Soma Takao in an eight-man tag team match, with Hino pinning Sasaki for the win. Crying Wolf remained undefeated for the remainder of the year, culminating on December 31, when Hino and Urano defeated Keisuke Ishii and Shigehiro Irie to win the KO-D Tag Team Championship. At the following event on January 8, 2012, Crying Wolf suffered its first loss, when Daisuke Sasaki pinned Urano in an eight-man tag team match. This led to a match on January 22, where Hino and Urano successfully defended the KO-D Tag Team Championship against Sasaki and Masa Takanashi. On February 11, Hino and Urano made another successful title defense, defeating Ishii and Irie in a rematch, which was followed eight days later by them also successfully defending the title against Makoto Oishi and Masao Inoue. On March 11, Hino and Urano lost the KO-D Tag Team Championship to Sanshiro Takagi and Soma Takao. On April 1, Hino, Urano and Keita Yano entered the annual Anytime and Anywhere battle royal, a match combining elements of a regular battle royal and a ladder match. Yano exited the match, after Hino helped him grab one of the letters hanging over the ring, giving him the right to book his own DDT event. Eventually, the match came down to Hino and Urano, with Hino pinning his tag team partner for the win to earn the first shot at the new KO-D Openweight Champion, Masa Takanashi. Before the match with Takanashi took place, Hino and Urano regained the KO-D Tag Team Championship from Takagi and Takao on April 15. On May 4, Hino defeated Takanashi to also become the new KO-D Openweight Champion. Nine days later, Hino and Urano made their first successful defense of the KO-D Tag Team Championship by defeating Danshoku Dino and Kota Ibushi. On May 27, Hino defeated Harashima for his first successful defense of the KO-D Openweight Championship. On June 3, Hino and Urano defeated Gentaro and Tomomitsu Matsunaga to make their second successful defense of the KO-D Tag Team Championship. On June 16, Hino and Urano lost the title to Kudo and Makoto Oishi. On June 24, Hino lost the KO-D Openweight Championship to Kota Ibushi, suffering his first direct pinfall loss in DDT in the process.

On July 8, Hino formed the Monster Army stable with Antonio Honda, Daisuke Sasaki, Hoshitango, Masa Takanashi and Yasu Urano. The group employed a military theme as each member was given a rank, with Hino taking the rank of a sergeant. On July 15, Hino and Urano received a rematch for the KO-D Tag Team Championship, but were again defeated by Kudo and Oishi. On July 22, the Monster Army was disbanded and split up into two opposing camps, Hino, Honda and Urano, again known as Crying Wolf, and Takanashi, Sasaki and Hoshitango, known as Familia. Crying Wolf disbanded on September 19, when Antonio Honda turned on Yasu Urano in the aftermath of DDT General Manager Amon Tsurumi ordering all stables in the promotion disbanded. Hino was then announced as a member of a new stable formed by Masa Takanashi and Toru Owashi. However, in his first match as a member of Takanashi's stable on September 30, Hino turned on Takanashi and joined Antonio Honda, Daisuke Sasaki and Hoshitango to reform the Monster Army, with Honda claiming that Takanashi and Urano were the ones who ruined the original stable. DDT's 2012 ended with a storyline, where Sanshiro Takagi brought in the New Japan Pro-Wrestling tag team of Hiroyoshi Tenzan and Satoshi Kojima to stop the Monster Army, in particular Antonio Honda, who had begun stealing other wrestlers' clothes. At the final event of the year on December 23, the entire Monster Army was defeated in a four-on-three handicap match by Takagi, Tenzan and Kojima, after which Hino, Honda, Sasaki and Hoshitango were all supposedly arrested by the New Japan duo. On January 27, 2013, Hino's 28th birthday, he, Honda and Sasaki defeated Team Drift (Keisuke Ishii, Shigehiro Irie and Soma Takao) to win the KO-D 6-Man Tag Team Championship. They made their first successful title defense on March 20 against the team of Danshoku Dino, Gabai-Ji-chan and Makoto Oishi. On April 13, the Monster Army made another successful title defense against Dino, Oishi and Alpha Female. On May 26, the Monster Army lost the KO-D 6-Man Tag Team Championship to Golden☆Rendezvous～ (Gota Ihashi, Kenny Omega and Kota Ibushi) in their third defense. On June 2, Hino teamed with Hoshitango to unsuccessfully challenge Hikaru Sato and Yukio Sakaguchi for the KO-D Tag Team Championship. On June 23, Monster Army, with Hoshitango replacing Daisuke Sasaki, regained the KO-D 6-Man Tag Team Championship from Golden☆Rendezvous～. However, the three lost the title in their first defense on July 21 to the team of Danshoku Dino, Kensuke Sasaki and Makoto Oishi. After recovering from an elbow surgery, Hino returned to DDT on March 21, 2014, to take part in Monster Army's final match together, where he, Honda, Sasaki and Hoshitango defeated Gorgeous Matsuno, Gota Ihashi, Sanshiro Takagi and Toru Owashi.

=== Wrestle-1 (2014, 2015–2019) ===
On January 31, 2014, Hino made his debut for Wrestle-1 (W-1), declaring a war on the entire promotion, before defeating Kai in a singles match. On March 22, Hino defeated Yasufumi Nakanoue in a singles match, after which he deemed his opponent "weak", starting a storyline rivalry between the two. Hino's entry to Wrestle-1 also led to interpromotional matches between Kaientai Dojo and Wrestle-1, including a match on April 13 at Kaientai Dojo's twelfth anniversary event, where Hino and Hiroki successfully defended the Strongest-K Tag Team Championship against Kaz Hayashi and Shuji Kondo. Back in Wrestle-1 four days later, Hino and Hiroki suffered an upset loss in a non-title match against Nakanoue and rookie Seiki Yoshioka. This led to a match at Wrestle-1's May 4 event, where Hino and Hiroki successfully defended the Strongest-K Tag Team Championship against Nakanoue and Yoshioka. Following the match, Hino, noting that he held victories over Kai, Kaz Hayashi and Shuji Kondo, declared himself the ace of Wrestle-1 and later in the event attacked Kai, after he had made his own claim for the title. On May 22, Hino suffered his first direct loss in Wrestle-1, when he was defeated by Kai.

On November 27, 2015, Hino returned to Wrestle-1 as the newest member of the Real Desperado stable. On January 10, 2016, he defeated Manabu Soya to become the new Wrestle-1 Champion. He made his first successful title defense on February 10 against Minoru Tanaka. After the match, Shuji Kondo entered the ring and challenged Hino to a title match, which resulted in Hino making his own challenge for Kondo's Wrestle-1 Tag Team Championship. On March 6, Hino became a double champion, when he and Real Desperado stablemate Kazma Sakamoto defeated Kondo and Masayuki Kono for the Wrestle-1 Tag Team Championship. This was followed by Hino making his second successful defense of the Wrestle-1 Championship against Kondo on March 13. On May 4, Hino lost the Wrestle-1 Championship to Kai in his third defense. On June 8, Hino and Sakamoto lost the Wrestle-1 Tag Team Championship to Yasufumi Nakanoue and Yuji Okabayashi in their third defense. Over the next month, Hino made it to the finals of the 2016 Wrestle-1 Grand Prix, but was defeated there on July 1 by Manabu Soya.

=== Other promotions ===
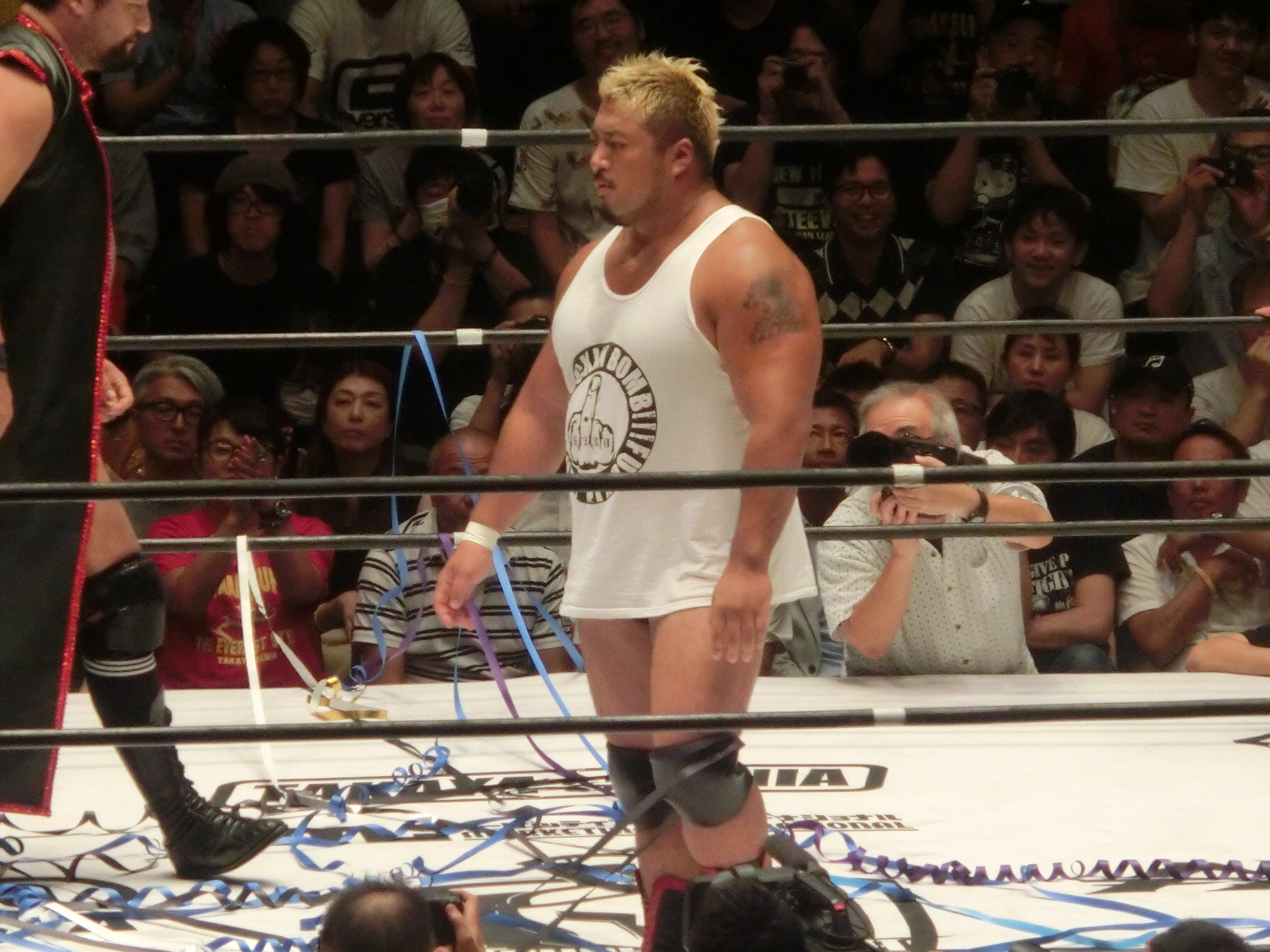
Hino at Takayamania 2018

In July 2004, Hino made his debut for All Japan Pro Wrestling (AJPW), working the Summer Action Series 2004 tour.

On May 2, 2014, Hino defeated Takashi Sasaki to win Pro Wrestling Freedoms' King of Freedom World Championship. After successfully defending the title against Minoru Fujita on July 24, he lost the title to Jun Kasai on September 15.

In September 2015, Hino returned to AJPW, taking part in the annual Ōdō Tournament. After defeating Zeus in his first round match and Yoshinobu Kanemaru in his second round match, Hino was eliminated from the tournament in the semifinals by eventual tournament winner, Jun Akiyama.

== Championships and accomplishments ==
- DDT Pro-Wrestling
  - KO-D Six Man Tag Team Championship (2 times) – with Antonio Honda and Daisuke Sasaki (1), and Antonio Honda and Hoshitango (1)
  - KO-D Openweight Championship (2 times)
  - KO-D Tag Team Championship (3 time) with Yasu Urano (2) and Makoto Oishi (1)
- Kaientai Dojo
  - Chiba Six Man Tag Team Championship (1 time) – with Bambi and Ricky Fuji
  - Strongest-K Championship (4 times)
  - Strongest-K Tag Team Championship (4 times) – with Saburo Inematsu (3) and Hiroki/Hi69 (1)
  - WEW Hardcore Tag Team Championship (1 time) – with Saburo Inematsu
  - 1-Day 3-Way Tournament (2009)
  - Bo-so Golden Tag Tournament (2014) – with Hiroki
  - Kaientai Dojo Tag League (2010) – with Shiori Asahi
  - Special Unit Formation Tournament (2012) – with Hiro Tonai, Kaji Tomato and Jonathan Bada
  - Strongest-K Tournament (2010)
  - Taj Mahal Cup Scramble 1-Day 6 Person Tag Team Tournament (2007) – with Makoto Oishi and Shiori Asahi
  - Newcomer of the Year (2004)
  - Singles Match of the Year (2008) vs. Kengo Mashimo on August 9
  - Singles Match of the Year (2010) vs. Kazma on August 15
  - Singles Match of the Year (2011) vs. Kengo Mashimo on June 18
  - Singles Match of the Year (2012) vs. Daisuke Sekimoto on November 13
  - Singles Match of the Year (2013) vs. Kengo Mashimo on July 15
  - Singles Match of the Year (2015) vs. Kengo Mashimo on February 22
  - Tag Team Match of the Year (2014) with Hi69 vs. Kaji Tomato and Shiori Asahi on November 3
  - Wrestler of the Year (2010, 2012)
- Pro Wrestling Freedoms
  - King of Freedom World Championship (1 time)
  - Barefoot King Championship (1 time)
- Pro Wrestling Illustrated
  - PWI ranked him #232 of the top 500 singles wrestlers in the PWI 500 in 2016
- Pro Wrestling Noah
  - GHC Tag Team Championship (1 time) – with Maybach Taniguchi
- Kyushu Pro-Wrestling
  - Kyushu Pro-Wrestling Championship (1 time)
  - Kyushu Pro-Wrestling Tag Team Championship (1 time) – with Ryota Chikuzen
- Pro Wrestling Zero1
  - NWA Intercontinental Tag Team Championship (2 times) – with Masato Tanaka (1) and Quiet Storm (1)
  - World Heavyweight Championship (1 time)
  - Fire Festival (2019)
  - Furinkazan (2019) – with Yuji Okabayashi
- Big Japan Pro Wrestling
  - World Is Not Enough Six Man Tag Team Tournament (2020) – with Akira Hyodo and Yuji Okabayashi
- Wrestle-1
  - Wrestle-1 Championship (1 time)
  - Wrestle-1 Tag Team Championship (1 time) – with Kazma Sakamoto
