= Shotaro Ashino =

Japanese wrestler (born 1990)

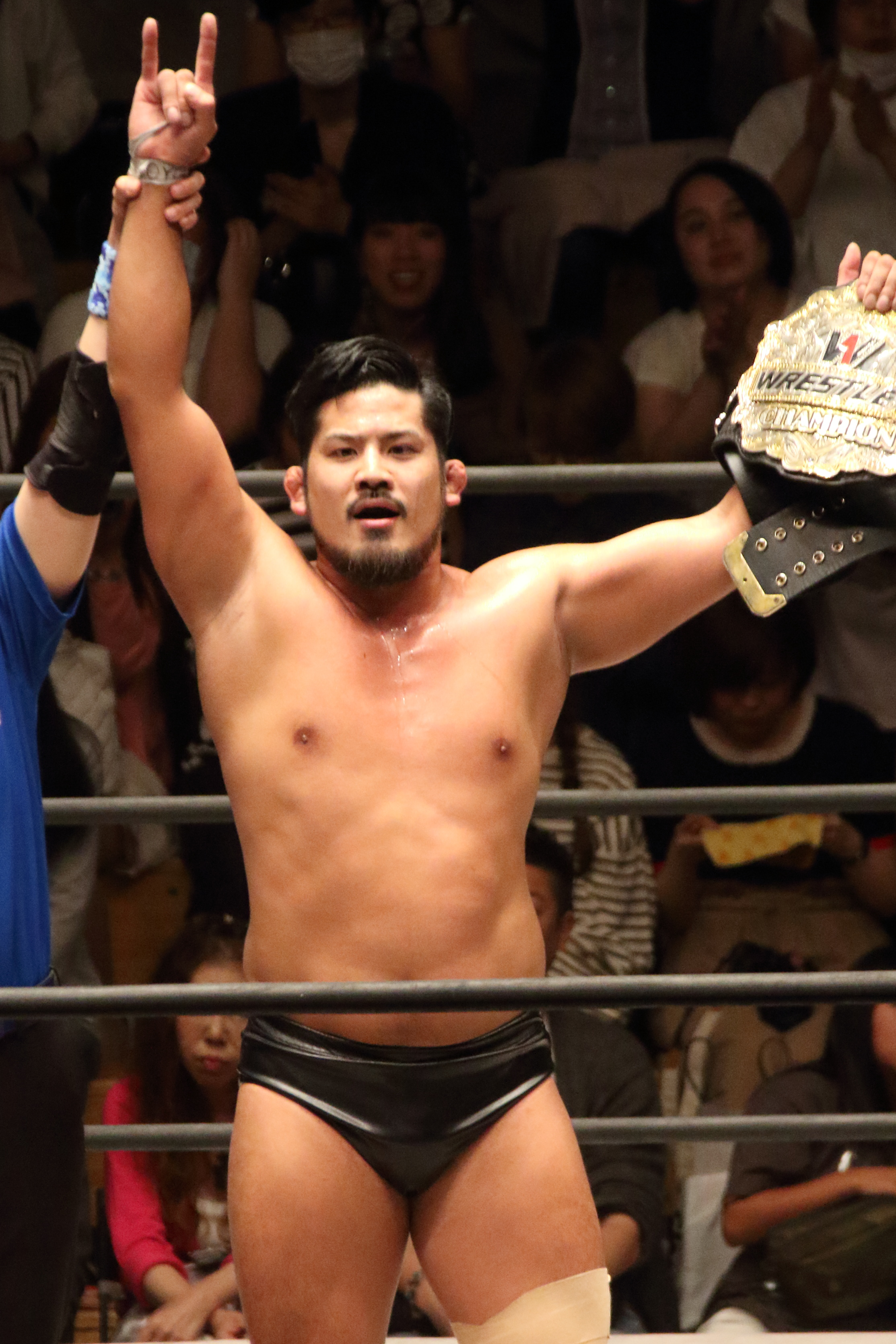
- Ashino as the Wrestle-1 Champion in June 2017

Personal information
- Born: January 4, 1990 (age 36) Nishi-Tokyo, Tokyo, Japan
- Education: Nippon Sport Science University

Professional wrestling career
- Ring name: Shotaro Ashino
- Billed height: 1.74 m (5 ft 8 1/2 in)
- Billed weight: 97 kg (214 lb)
- Trained by: Keiji Mutoh; Kaz Hayashi; Wrestle-1
- Debut: February 13, 2015

Shotaro Ashino (芦野 祥太郎, Ashino Shōtarō; born January 4, 1990) is a Japanese professional wrestler who is signed to All Japan Pro Wrestling (AJPW). He was trained by and best known for his time in Wrestle-1, where he was a former two time Wrestle-1 Champion.

== Early life ==
Ashino was an amateur wrestler throughout his youth, competing in the sport throughout high school and university. Ashino graduated from Nippon Sport Science University and after being recommended by Hiroshi Hase, joined the Wrestle-1 dojo in August 2014, where he trained under Keiji Mutoh and Kaz Hayashi.

== Professional wrestling career ==
=== Wrestle-1 ===
==== Trigger (2015–2017) ====
After being trained in the dojo for six months, Ashino made his debut for Wrestle-1 on February 13, 2015, defeating Kumagoro. In August, Ashino took part in the 2015 Wrestle-1 Grand Prix, defeating Nosawa Rongai in the first round but losing to Manabu Soya in the quarter-finals. In late 2015, Ashino formed Trigger (stylised as TriggeR) alongside Masayuki Kono, Shuji Kondo and Hiroki Murase after Kondo turned on longtime partner Kaz Hayashi during a match against Ashino and Murase. On November 3, Murase and Ashino unsuccessfully challenged Manabu Soya and Jun Kasai for the Wrestle-1 Tag Team Championship. On June 8, 2016, Ashino received his first shot at the Wrestle-1 Championship, unsuccessfully challenging Kai. In July, Ashino once again participated in the Wrestle-1 Grand Prix, making it to the semi-finals where he faced Manabu Soya, however, the match was quickly brought to an end after Ashino suffered a legitimate injury to his right leg. Ashino took three months to recover, and returned in November. In January 2017, after Trigger stablemate Masayuki Kono had successfully defended the Wrestle-1 Championship against Shuji Kondo, Ashino challenged him to a match for the championship. On March 20, Ashino defeated Kono to win the championship for the first time in his career. After successfully defending the championship against Shuji Kondo on April 19, Ashino left Trigger.

==== Enfants Terribles (2017–2020) ====
Prior to leaving Trigger, Ashino regularly teamed with Seigo Tachibana and this continued following the split from Trigger. On July 12, Ashino and Tachibana defeated Ganeski Tanaka after Yusuke Kodama turned on him mid-match. The three men attacked Tanaka and later Daiki Inaba after the match, with Kodama cementing his defection from New Era. The trio of Kodama, Ashino and Tachibana would go on to be known as Enfants Terribles. At Pro Wrestling Love in Yokohama 2017, Ashino defended his Wrestle-1 Championship against Jiro Kuroshio for his fourth successful defence. Following a fifth title defence against Daiki Inaba, a fourth man dubbed Drunk Andy by Ashino joined Enfants Terribles. From September 24 until October 2, Ashino teamed with Kodama to take part in the Wrestle-1 Tag League, missing out on a semi-final berth with only one win. On October 21, Ashino, Kodama and Tachibana defeated New Era's Jiro Kuroshio, Koji Doi and Kumagoro to win the UWA World Trios Championship. The trio made two successful defences before losing the titles to another New Era trio in Doi, Kumagoro and Takanori Ito on December 2. On March 14, 2018, Ashino fell in his eighth Wrestle-1 Championship defence to Manabu Soya. At the time of Wrestle-1's closure, Ashino's first Wrestle-1 Championship reign was the longest in the title's history at 359 days, with Ashino making a record seven title defences.

On April 18, Kumagoro joined Enfants Terrible after turning on Koji Doi after losing the Wrestle-1 Tag Team Championship. Following the match, Ashino and Kumagoro challenged Akira and Manabu Soya to a title match. On May 6, Ashino and Kumagoro won the Wrestle-1 Tag Team Championships, with Kumagoro changing his name to Kumaarashi after the match. During the post-match celebration, Drunk Andy revealed himself to be Kenichiro Arai and attacked Tachibana; Ashino would later kick out Tachibana from Enfants Terribles. On June 22, Ashino and Kumaarashi lost the Wrestle-1 Tag Team Titles to Kuroshio and Masato Tanaka. After defeating Kaz Hayashi on July 1 in the opening round of the 2018 Wrestle-1 Grand Prix, Ashino was matched against Manabu Soya, a repeat of 2016's Grand Prix semi-final. On July 18, Ashino defeated Soya and went on to win the Wrestle-1 Grand Prix by defeating Koji Doi in the tournament finals. At Pro Wrestling Love in Yokohama 2018, Ashino reclaimed the Wrestle-1 Championship from Manabu Soya. After two successful title defences, Ashino lost the Wrestle-1 Championship to T-Hawk on January 5, 2019. On July 2, Ashino would once again make it to the Wrestle-1 Grand Prix final but lost to Daiki Inaba.

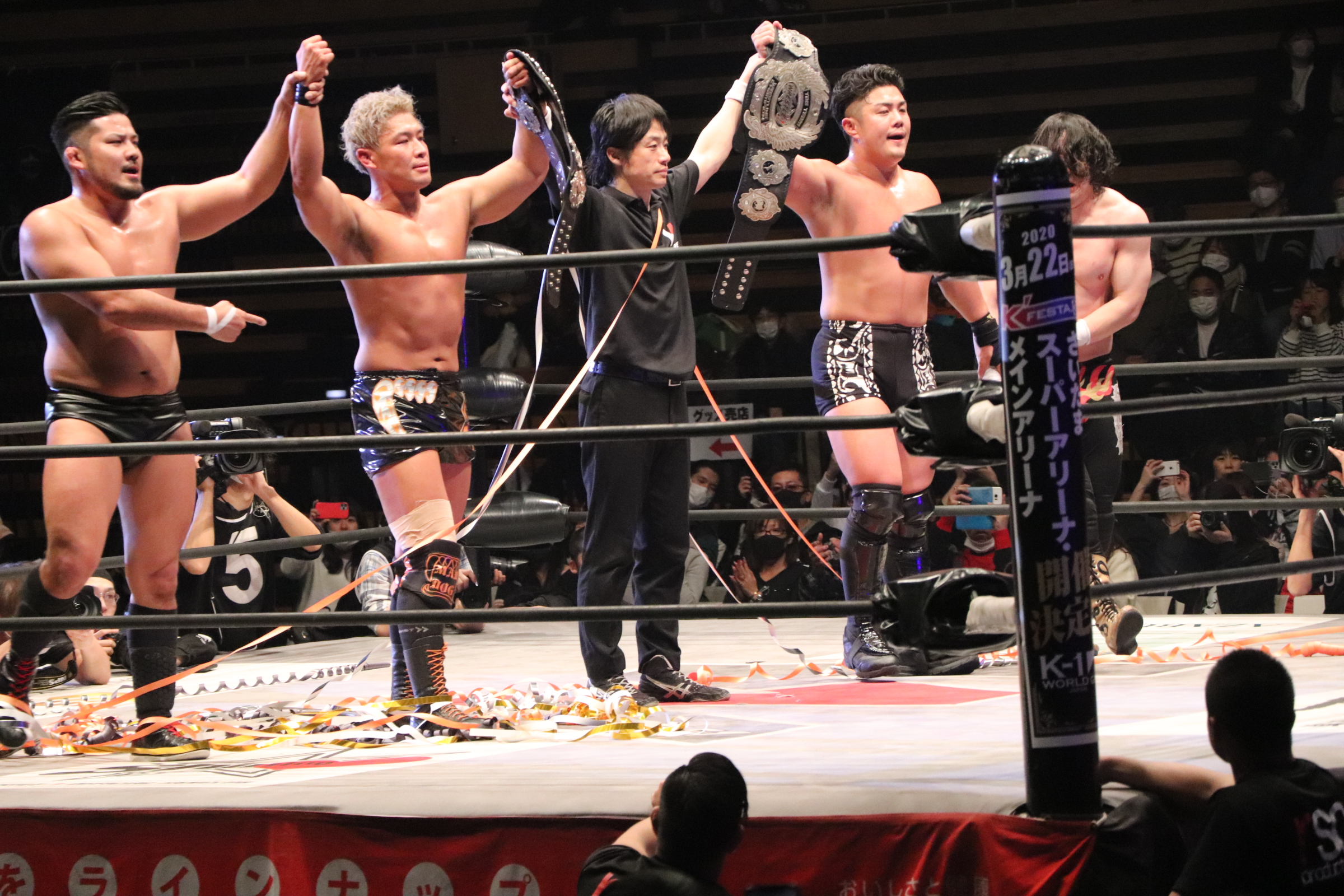
Ashino (left) and Yusuke Kodama (right) after losing the Wrestle-1 Tag Team Championship to Daiki Inaba (center left) and Koji Doi (center right) at Wrestle Wars in March 2020

On August 8, Ashino and Kodama won the vacant Wrestle-1 Tag Team Championship after defeating Manabu Soya and Shuji Kondo. At Pro Wrestling Love in Yokohama 2019, Ashino and Kodama successfully defended their titles against Strong Hearts' El Lindaman and Shigehiro Irie. Ashino and Kodama made two further title defences before losing the Wrestle-1 Tag Team Championships to Daiki Inaba and Koji Doi at Wrestle Wars in March 2020.

On February 29, 2020, Wrestle-1 announced that they would be holding their final event on April 1, with all members of the roster being released from their contracts the day prior.

=== All Japan Pro Wrestling (2020–present) ===
On April 6, Ashino made his debut for All Japan Pro Wrestling where he announced he would make All Japan his "main battlefield". On April 30, Ashino made his in-ring debut teaming with a mystery partner, later revealed to be the debuting Yusuke Kodama, against Takao Omori and Hokuto Omori with Ashino and Kodama emerging victorious. The following week, Kumaarashi also joined All Japan and the trio quickly established Enfants Terribles as a force to be reckoned with; they would later be joined by Hokuto Omori and Koji Doi. On June 25, Ashino defeated Yuma Aoyagi in a number one contendership match for the Triple Crown Heavyweight Championship. Five days later, Ashino received his shot against Suwama but was defeated. In his first Champion Carnival, Ashino earned four points from an available eight through victories over Shuji Ishikawa and Yoshitatsu. Although not enough to progress to the finals, his victory over Ishikawa earned him an opportunity to challenge Ishikawa and Suwama for the World Tag Team Championship. On October 24, Ashino and Kumaarashi were unsuccessful in their challenge. Nevertheless, the duo entered their first Real World Tag League together, finishing the tournament with three wins from seven matches and near the bottom of the tournament table. On January 24, 2021, Ashino unsuccessfully challenged Suwama for the Triple Crown Heavyweight Championship for a second time.

On February 23, the members of Enfants Terribles turned on Ashino during a six man tag team match. In the post match beatdown, Jake Lee also attacked Ashino and turned on his tag partner Iwamoto with the five men leaving together.

In August 2025, Ashino formed a stable, "HAVOC", with Oddyssey and Xyon.

== Personal life ==
Ashino is a fan of the rock band Metallica, and a supporter of the English football team Arsenal.

== Championships and accomplishments ==
- All Japan Pro Wrestling
  - Gaora TV Championship (1 time)
  - World Tag Team Championship (2 times) – with Suwama (1) and Ryuki Honda (1)
  - Champion Carnival (2023)
- Kuroshio Tokyo Japan Produce
  - Smash Championship (1 time)
- Pro Wrestling Illustrated
  - Ranked No. 216 of the top 500 singles wrestlers in the PWI 500 in 2021
- Wrestle-1

- Wrestle-1 Championship (2 times)
- Wrestle-1 Tag Team Championship (2 times) – with Kumaarashi (1) and Yusuke Kodama (1)
- UWA World Trios Championship (1 time) – with Seigo Tachibana and Yusuke Kodama
- Wrestle-1 Grand Prix (2018)
