= Noah Higher Ground 2022 =

2022 Pro Wrestling Noah event

- Promotional poster featuring Kenoh and Masakatsu Funaki
- Promotion: CyberFight
- Brand: Pro Wrestling Noah
- Date: January 22, 2022
- City: Osaka, Japan
- Venue: Edion Arena Osaka
- Attendance: 456

Pay-per-view chronology
← Previous; Bumper Crop 2022 In Sendai	Next → Gain Control 2022 In Nagoya

Noah Higher Ground 2022 was a professional wrestling event promoted by CyberFight's sub-brand Pro Wrestling Noah. It took place on January 22, 2022, in Osaka, Japan, at the Edion Arena Osaka. The event aired on CyberAgent's AbemaTV online linear television service and CyberFight's streaming service Wrestle Universe.

Seven matches were contested at the event, and two of Noah's five championships were on the line. The main event saw Masakatsu Funaki defeat Kenoh to win the GHC National Championship. In another prominent match, Scramble Time (Seiki Yoshioka and Yuya Susumu) defeated Atsushi Kotoge and Hajime Ohara to win the vacant GHC Junior Heavyweight Championship.

== Storylines ==
The event featured seven professional wrestling matches that resulted from scripted storylines, where wrestlers portrayed villains, heroes, or less distinguishable characters in the scripted events that built tension and culminated in a wrestling match or series of matches.

=== Event ===
The event started with the confrontation between ex-tag team partners Hao and Nio after Hao betrayed Kongo one week prior at Bumper Crop 2022 In Sendai. The bout ended in a time-limit draw. Next up, King Tany and Mohammed Yone picked up a victory over Kotaro Suzuki and Nosawa Rongai in tag team competition. The third bout saw Stinger leader Hayata outmatching Yo-Hey in singles competition. In the fourth match, Daisuke Harada, Go Shiozaki and Masa Kitamiya defeated Aleja, Katsuhiko Nakajima and Manabu Soya in six-man tag team action. Next up, Seiki Yoshioka and Yuya Susumu defeated Atsushi Kotoge and Hajime Ohara to win the vacant GHC Junior Heavyweight Tag Team Championship after Yoshinari Ogawa previously relinquishing his half of the championship held alongside Hayata due to testing positive for COVID-19. In the semi main event, Masato Tanaka and one half of the GHC Tag Team Champions Naomichi Marufuji defeated Kazushi Sakuraba and Takashi Sugiura in tag team action.

In the main event, Masakatsu Funaki defeated Kenoh in less than four minutes to win the GHC National Championship, ending the champion's reign at 70 days and three consecutive defenses.

== Results ==
No.	Results	Stipulations	Times
1	Hao vs. Nio ended in a time-limit draw	Singles match	20:00
2	Funky Express (King Tany and Mohammed Yone) defeated Los Perros del Mal de Japón (Kotaro Suzuki and Nosawa Rongai) by pinfall	Tag team match	9:31
3	Hayata defeated Yo-Hey by pinfall	Singles match	13:24
4	Daisuke Harada, Go Shiozaki and Masa Kitamiya defeated Kongo (Aleja, Katsuhiko Nakajima and Manabu Soya) by pinfall	Six-man tag team match	16:54
5	Scramble Time (Seiki Yoshioka and Yuya Susumu) defeated Atsushi Kotoge and Hajime Ohara by pinfall	Tag team match for the vacant GHC Junior Heavyweight Tag Team Championship	7:39
6	M's Alliance (Masato Tanaka and Naomichi Marufuji) defeated Sugiura-gun (Kazushi Sakuraba and Takashi Sugiura) by pinfall	Tag team match	20:26
7	Masakatsu Funaki defeated Kenoh (c) by pinfall	Singles match for the GHC National Championship	3:58
(c) / – the champion(s) heading into the match
