= Noah Bumper Crop 2022 In Sendai =

2022 Pro Wrestling Noah event

- Promotional poster featuring Keiji Mutoh, Katsuhiko Nakajima and Kaito Kiyomiya
- Promotion: CyberFight
- Brand(s): Pro Wrestling Noah
- Date: January 16, 2022
- City: Sendai, Japan
- Venue: Sendai Sun Plaza
- Attendance: 633

Pay-per-view chronology
← Previous; The New Year 2022	Next → Higher Ground 2022

Noah Bumper Crop 2022 In Sendai was a professional wrestling event promoted by CyberFight's sub-brand Pro Wrestling Noah. It took place on January 16, 2022, in Sendai, Japan, at the Sendai Sun Plaza. The event aired on CyberAgent's AbemaTV online linear television service and CyberFight's streaming service Wrestle Universe.

Seven matches were contested at the event, and two of Noah's five championships were on the line. The main event saw Katsuhiko Nakajima defeat Masa Kitamiya to retain the GHC Heavyweight Championship. In another prominent match, M's Alliance (Keiji Muto and Naomichi Marufuji) successfully retained the GHC Tag Team Championship against Kongo (Kenoh and Manabu Soya).

== Storylines ==
The event featured seven professional wrestling matches that resulted from scripted storylines, where wrestlers portrayed villains, heroes, or less distinguishable characters in the scripted events that built tension and culminated in a wrestling match or series of matches.

=== Event ===
The event started with the confrontation between Kotaro Suzuki, Nosawa Rongai and Yo-Hey, and Aleja, Hao and Nio, solded with the victory of the preceding team. Next, Atsushi Kotoge and Hajime Ohara defeated Hayata and Yuya Susumu in tag team action. The third bout saw Daisuke Harada picking up a victory over Seiki Yoshioka in singles competition. In the fourth match, Daisuke Harada and Hao defeated Aleja and Nio after Hao turned on Kongo. Next, Sugiura-gun (Kazushi Sakuraba, Kazuyuki Fujita, Kendo Kashin and Takashi Sugiura) outmatched Funky Express (King Tany and Mohammed Yone), Go Shiozaki and Masakatsu Funaki in eighth-man tag team action. In the semi main event, Keiji Muto and Naomichi Marufuji marked their second defense of the GHC Tag Team Championship against Kenoh and Manabu Soya.

In the main event, Katsuhiko Nakajima marked his fourth successful defense in a row of the GHC Heavyweight Championship against Masa Kitamiya. After the match concluded, Najakima received a challenge from Kazuyuki Fujita.

== Results ==
No.	Results	Stipulations	Times
1	Los Perros del Mal de Japón (Kotaro Suzuki, Nosawa Rongai and Yo-Hey) defeated Kongo (Aleja, Hao and Nio) by pinfall	Six-man tag team match	8:56
2	Atsushi Kotoge and Hajime Ohara defeated Stinger (Hayata and Yuya Susumu) by pinfall	Tag team match	11:50
3	Daisuke Harada defeated Seiki Yoshioka by pinfall	Singles match	12:07
4	Daisuke Harada and Hao defeated Kongo (Aleja and Nio) by pinfall	Tag team match	9:59
5	Sugiura-gun (Kazushi Sakuraba, Kazuyuki Fujita, Kendo Kashin and Takashi Sugiura) defeated Funky Express (King Tany and Mohammed Yone), Go Shiozaki and Masakatsu Funaki by pinfall	Eight-man tag team match	18:54
6	M's Alliance (Keiji Muto and Naomichi Marufuji) (c) defeated Kongo (Kenoh and Manabu Soya) by pinfall	Tag team match for the GHC Tag Team Championship	20:55
7	Katsuhiko Nakajima (c) defeated Masa Kitamiya by pinfall	Singles match for the GHC Heavyweight Championship	28:40
(c) / – the champion(s) heading into the match
