= Daiki Inaba =

Japanese professional wrestler

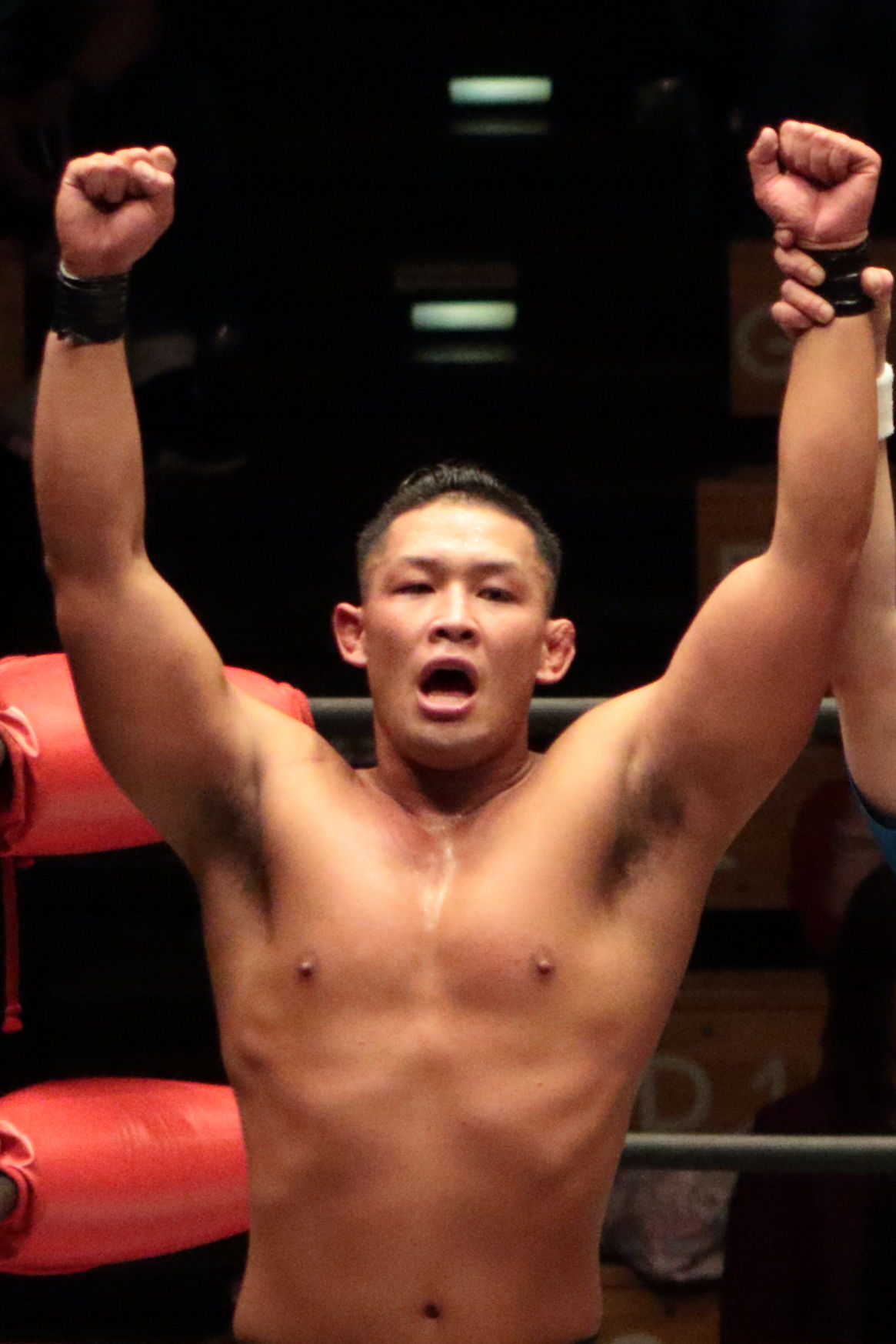

Personal information
- Born: Daiki Inaba; February 28, 1988 (age 38) Yamaga, Kumamoto, Japan

Professional wrestling career
- Ring name(s): Daiki Inaba; Tokyo Inaba; Hiroki Inaba; America VIP
- Billed height: 172 cm (5 ft 7 1/2 in)
- Billed weight: 82 kg (181 lb)
- Trained by: Emile Duprée; Keiji Mutoh; El Pantera; Shuji Kondo; Bobby Sharp
- Debut: May 3, 2013

Daiki Inaba (稲葉 大樹, Inaba Daiki; born February 28, 1988) is a Japanese professional wrestler who currently competes as a freelancer, majorly for Pro Wrestling Noah. He's best known for his time in Wrestle-1, where he was a former two-time Wrestle-1 Champion, former one-time and final holder Wrestle-1 Tag Team Champion with Koji Doi and the winner of the 2019 Wrestle-1 Grand Prix. His nickname is Mad Dog and he currently works as a babyface (hero).

== Early career ==
Inaba participated in Amateur wrestling and Judo while attending college. After college, he continued his training while working for former New Japan Pro-Wrestling wrestler and medical trainer Takeshi Misawa's osteopathic clinic.

== Professional Wrestling career ==
=== AJPW/North American promotions (2012–2013) ===
In January 2012, Inaba successfully passed a public audition for All Japan Pro Wrestling (AJPW) and began training full-time in their dojo. After training for 17 months, he was sent on an overseas learning excursion and made his professional wrestling debut on May 3, 2013, for an independent Mexican wrestling promotion under the ring name Hiroki Inaba in a match that fellow AJPW wrestler Andy Wu was also involved in. On May 24, Inaba made his debut for Emile Duprée's Atlantic Grand Prix Wrestling (AGPW) in Canada under the ring name Tokyo Inaba. Wrestling mainly in losing efforts against Bobby Sharp and wearing facepaint during his matches, he continued to work for the promotion during their summer tour until June 22. Inaba also teamed with AJPW wrestler Seiya Sanada to take on Sharp and another AJPW wrestler, René Duprée. Inaba briefly returned to Mexico on August 18 to work a tag team match for International Wrestling Revolution Group (IWRG) under the name America VIP. During this time, there was a mass exodus from AJPW, and while abroad, Inaba made the decision to join new promotion Wrestle-1 (W-1) run by one of his AJPW trainers, Keiji Muto.

=== Wrestle-1 (2013–2020) ===
Inaba returned to Japan and made his debut for Wrestle-1 at the promotion's inaugural event Wrestle-1 Hataage Sen on September 8, 2013. In W-1's first ever match, he teamed with Hiroshi Yamato in a winning effort against Tokyo Gurentai (Mazada and Nosawa Rongai).

On March 2, 2014, at Kaisen: Outbreak, Inaba teamed with Andy Wu and Hiroshi Yamato in a losing effort against Kazushi Miyamoto and Tokyo Gurentai (Mazada and Nosawa Rongai). On March 15, Inaba competed in a battle royal to determine the number one contender for the TNA X Division Championship, which was won by Seiki Yoshioka.

On July 29, 2016, Inaba along with Andy Wu and Seiki Yoshioka defeated Kaz Hayashi, Minoru Tanaka and Tajiri to win the UWA World Trios Championships. On August 24, Inaba defeated Kai to become the Wrestle-1 Champion. Three days later, he, along with Andy & Yoshioka successfully defended their UWA World Trios belts against Hiroki Murase, Kai & Shota. He would defend the Wrestle-1 Championship against Kai a month later in Korakuen Hall. On October 2, after again defending the UWA World Trios Championship with Andy & Yoshioka, this time against Koji Doi, Kumagoro & Yusuke Kodama, all six men formed an alliance, it would later be named Newera. On November 2, 2016, Inaba lost the Wrestle-1 Championship to Masayuki Kono during the Wrestle-1 2016 Autumn Tour on the first night of the tour. A month later, he also lost the UWA World Trios Championship to Jun Kasai, Nosawa Rongai & Shuji Kondo, with Kondo pinning Inaba after a King Kong Lariat.

On February 22, 2017, Inaba again won the UWA World Trios Championship, this time with Kohei Fujimura (who had recently joined Newera) & Yusuke Kodama. The three would hold the belt for 46 days, defending successfully once before losing them to Trigger representatives (Masayuki Kono & Shuji Kondo) & Kaz Hayashi.

In 2018, Newera broke up after repeated infighting.

On July 2, 2019, Inaba won the Wrestle-1 Grand Prix, in his third attempt. He defeated Shotaro Ashino in the final and on September 1, 2019, at W-1 Pro-Wrestling Love In Yokohama 2019, Inaba defeated T-Hawk to become a two time Wrestle-1 Champion. He would defend the title successfully against Kuma Arashi before losing it to Katsuhiko Nakajima of Pro Wrestling Noah on January 12, 2020.

On February 21, 2020, Wrestle-1 announced it would be indefinitely suspended on April 1 and that all wrestlers would be immediately released from their contracts. On March 15, Inaba and Koji Doi became the final Wrestle-1 Tag Team Champions after defeating Shotaro Ashino & Yusuke Kodama. On April 1, Wrestle-1 held its to-date final show, Wrestle-1 Tour 2020 Trans Magic in Korakuen Hall, and Inaba was part of the winning team in an 8-man tag team match opposing Wrestle-1 executives Keiji Muto & Kaz Hayashi. His W-1 Tag Team Championship was retired immediately afterward.

=== Freelancer (2020–present) ===
After finishing up with Wrestle-1, Inaba was now a freelancer. He appeared in Pro Wrestling Noah on their Noah New Hope show on May 31, challenging Kaito Kiyomiya after the main event. On July 5, the two had a match, and Kiyomiya was victorious. Afterwards though, Kiyomiya agreed to team with him, and Inaba officially welcomed into Noah's Home Team, while not being a contracted wrestler.

In February 2021, Inaba suffered an injury. After 5 months, Inaba returned as a surprise tag partner of Kiyomiya & Masa Kitamiya at Noah Up To Emotion 2021 in Korakuen Hall. They were unsuccessful against Kongo (Kenoh, Katsuhiko Nakajima & Manabu Soya), with Inaba being pinned by Soya, who was also a part of Wrestle-1 throughout its entire history, after a Powerbomb. Inaba wished to face Kiyomiya one-on-one again, and he accepted. Their match was scheduled for July 27 at Noah Sanctuary in Kawasaki, and Kiyomiya won with a Tiger Suplex. On August 6, Inaba was announced as a participant in the 2021 N-1 Victory, where he would fight in B Block against Kenoh, Masaaki Mochizuki & Kazunari Murakami.

== Championships and accomplishments ==
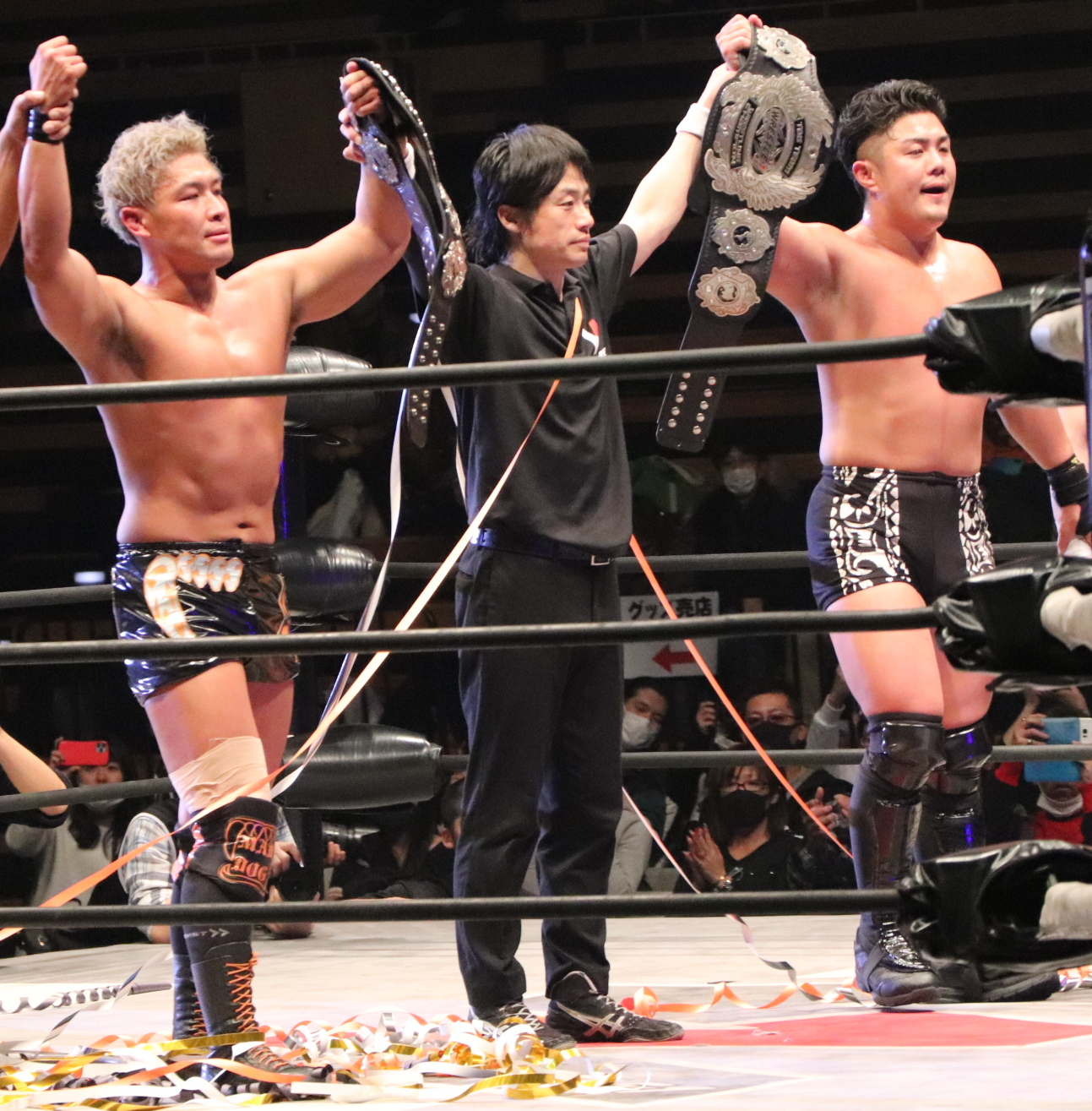
Daiki Inaba (left) and Koji Doi (right) after winning the Wrestle-1 Tag Team Championship at Wrestle Wars in March 2020

- Pro Wrestling Noah
  - GHC Tag Team Championship (2 times) – with Masa Kitamiya (1) and Manabu Soya (1)
- Wrestle-1
  - Wrestle-1 Championship (2 times)
  - Wrestle-1 Tag Team Championship (1 time, final) – with Koji Doi
  - UWA World Trios Championship (2 times) – with Andy Wu and Seiki Yoshioka (1), Kohei Fujimura and Yusuke Kodama (1)
  - Wrestle-1 Grand Prix (2019)
