= Kai (wrestler) =

Japanese professional wrestler (born 1983)

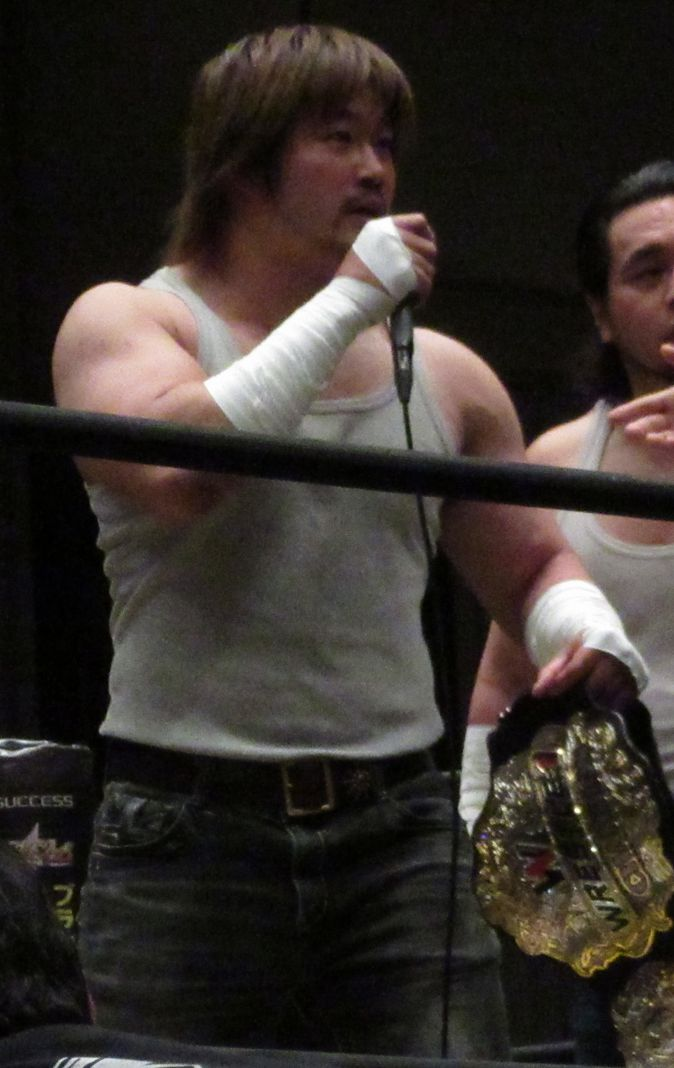
- Kai holding the Wrestle-1 Championship belt in May 2016

Personal information
- Born: Atsushi Sakai; May 20, 1983 (age 43) Yokohama, Kanagawa

Professional wrestling career
- Ring name: Kai
- Billed height: 1.77 m (5 ft 9 1/2 in)
- Billed weight: 87 kg (192 lb) (as a junior heavyweight); 100 kg (220 lb) (as a heavyweight)
- Trained by: Animal Hamaguchi; Kaz Hayashi; Keiji Mutoh; Virus
- Debut: February 22, 2007

Atsushi Sakai (境 敦史, Sakai Atsushi; born May 20, 1983) is a Japanese professional wrestler better known under the ring name Kai (stylized in all capital letters). Best known for his work in the All Japan Pro Wrestling promotion, Kai is an accomplished junior heavyweight wrestler, having won the World Junior Heavyweight Championship twice and the Junior League also twice (2008 and 2011), while he and Kaz Hayashi also won the 2011 Junior Tag League. In August 2012, Kai announced that he was ending his junior heavyweight days and becoming a heavyweight wrestler. After taking a seven-month break from in-ring action, Kai returned to All Japan in March 2013, now working as a heavyweight wrestler. However, the following July, Kai quit All Japan following a change in the promotion's management and joined the new Wrestle-1 promotion. In March 2015, Kai won the promotion's top title, the Wrestle-1 Championship. He went on to win the title two more times, before quitting Wrestle-1 in December 2016 to become a freelancer.

== Professional wrestling career ==
=== Training ===
After three and a half years of initial training under Animal Hamaguchi, Sakai passed an audition in 2006 to enter Keiji Mutoh's All Japan Pro Wrestling (AJPW) affiliated Mutohjuku training school, where he continued training under Mutoh and Kaz Hayashi.

=== All Japan Pro Wrestling ===
==== Junior heavyweight (2007–2012) ====
In 2007, All Japan Pro Wrestling sent Sakai on a learning excursion to Mexico, where he made his in-ring debut on February 22, 2007, in a tag team match, where he, performing under the ring name Kai, and Yamato faced Los Traumas (Trauma I and Trauma II). Kai finally returned to his native country and All Japan Pro Wrestling in February 2008. He was quick to achieve his first accomplishment in his home promotion by winning the 2008 Junior League the following August. As a result of his win, Kai earned his first shot at the World Junior Heavyweight Championship, but was defeated in the title match on August 31 by the defending champion, Ryuji Hijikata. For his first years in All Japan, Kai teamed regularly with Hiroshi Yamato and in late 2008 the two joined forces with Satoshi Kojima and Zodiac to form the "F4" (Friend, Fight, Fan and Future) stable, with Kojima being positioned as the leader of the group. On October 13, Kai made his debut for New Japan Pro-Wrestling at Destruction '08, teaming with Kojima and Yamato in a six-man tag team match, where they were defeated by Great Bash Heel (Togi Makabe, Tomohiro Ishii and Toru Yano). In All Japan, F4 mainly feuded with the Voodoo Murders stable.

On September 6, 2009, Kai returned to Mexico to work events held by the Alianza Universal de Lucha Libre (AULL) and International Wrestling Revolution Group (IWRG) promotions. On January 30, 2010, Kai made his American debut for Pro Wrestling Guerrilla (PWG) in Los Angeles, California as part of WrestleReunion 4. He teamed with The Great Muta in a tag team match, where they defeated The Dynasty (Joey Ryan and Scott Lost). Back in All Japan, Kai received another shot at the World Junior Heavyweight Championship on March 21, 2010, but was again defeated by the defending champion, this time Kaz Hayashi. The following August, Kai made it to the finals of the 2010 Junior League, before losing to Jimmy Yang. In November 2010, Kai worked a tour of France with the American Wrestling Rampage (AWR) promotion.

In April 2011, Kai teamed up with former opponent, Kaz Hayashi, to win the 2011 Junior Tag League. On May 15, Kai defeated Hayashi to become the number one contender to the World Junior Heavyweight Championship. After the reigning champion, Minoru, was suspended, the World Junior Heavyweight Championship was vacated, leading to a match on June 19, where Kai defeated Shuji Kondo in a decision match to finally win the title for the first time. Kai made his first successful title defense on July 31, defeating the returning Minoru, who was now working under his real name Minoru Tanaka. Kai's second defense took place on August 13, when he defeated former tag team partner Hiroshi Yamato. On September 25, Kai defeated Koji Kanemoto in the finals to win the 2011 Junior League. However, an earlier round-robin loss against Kenny Omega led to Kai offering him the next shot at his title. This led to a match on October 23, where Kai lost the World Junior Heavyweight Championship to Omega, ending his reign at two successful defenses and 126 days. Kai, however, ended his year on a high note, when he and Seiya Sanada won the 2011 World's Strongest Tag Determination League by defeating Masakatsu Funaki and Masayuki Kono in the finals on December 4. They were, however, defeated in their match for the World Tag Team Championship on January 3, 2012, by the defending champions, Dark Cuervo and Dark Ozz. On May 27, Kai defeated Kenny Omega to regain the World Junior Heavyweight Championship. On June 1, Kai returned to the United States, teaming with The Great Muta to defeat Anthony Nese and Sami Callihan at a Pro Wrestling Syndicate (PWS) internet pay-per-view in Rahway, New Jersey. At another PWS event the following day, Kai wrestled Nese to a fifteen-minute time limit draw. Kai's second World Junior Heavyweight Championship reign lasted just 77 days as he lost the title to Hiroshi Yamato in his first defense on August 12. On August 27, All Japan announced that Kai would be taking an indefinite break from in-ring competition as he was getting ready bulk up and leave the junior heavyweight division and become a heavyweight wrestler.

==== Heavyweight (2013) ====
On February 23, 2013, All Japan Pro Wrestling announced that Kai would be making his return to the ring and his debut as a heavyweight on March 17 against Seiya Sanada in Ryōgoku Kokugikan. On March 17, Kai defeated Sanada in his heavyweight debut match. On April 18, Kai entered his first Champion Carnival, losing to Masakatsu Funaki in his opening round-robin match. After one more loss and two wins, Kai finished his round-robin portion of the tournament with a win over Joe Doering on April 27 and, as a result, managed to finish second in his block, advancing to the semifinals. On April 29, Kai defeated Go Shiozaki to advance to the finals of the tournament, where he was defeated by Jun Akiyama. On June 2, Kai dislocated his left elbow during a match with Masayuki Kono. Though an MRI revealed no abnormalities in the bone or ligaments, Kai had suffered biceps damage, which would take three months to heal, sidelining him from in-ring action. While Kai was out with his injury, Nobuo Shiraishi took over as the new president of All Japan, leading to former owner Keiji Mutoh, as well as several wrestlers loyal to him, quitting the promotion. On July 1, Shiraishi officially confirmed the resignations of nine wrestlers, including Kai.

=== Wrestle-1 (2013–2016) ===
On July 10, 2013, Keiji Mutoh held a press conference to announce the foundation of his new Wrestle-1 promotion, announcing Kai as part of its roster. Kai returned from his injury during the promotion's inaugural event on September 8, when he defeated his surprise opponent Seiya Sanada in a singles match. Following the match, Kai announced that he was going to become the "ace" of Wrestle-1, repeating a claim he had made at the previous day's press conference. Kai and Sanada had a rematch in the main event of Wrestle-1's second show on September 15; this time Sanada was victorious. The two continued working against each other for the rest of the September tour, splitting victories. Kai and Sanada concluded their five match series on October 6 in the main event of Wrestle-1's first-ever show in Korakuen Hall with Kai picking up the win to take the series 3–2. Post-match, he once again proclaimed himself the ace of Wrestle-1. However, despite the seemingly decisive win and Kai announcing that he wanted the match series to end, he was successfully provoked by Sanada into resuming the series, after being pinned by his rival in a tag team match on October 8. Kai and Sanada were finally split away from each other during the November tour, when the singles match series between the two was tied at 4–4 and the tag team match series 1–1. In January 2014, Kai found himself at odds with new on-screen matchmaker Manabu Soya, who claimed that Kai was not worthy of the title of Wrestle-1 ace, after he had been defeated by Minoru Tanaka on January 12, and instead named Seiya Sanada his own ace candidate. Kai then went on a losing streak, which included losses against Tanaka in a rematch, Masakatsu Funaki, and the debuting Yuji Hino.

Because of his losing streak, Soya originally did not pick Kai as a participant in the TNA World Heavyweight Championship number one contender's tournament, however, when Seiya Sanada opted not to enter the tournament in order to instead chase the TNA X Division Championship, Kai was allowed to take his place. On February 15, Kai ended his losing streak, when he first defeated Minoru Tanaka in a first round match and then Masakatsu Funaki in the finals to win the tournament and earn a shot at the TNA World Heavyweight Championship. Kai received his title shot on March 2 at Kaisen: Outbreak, but was defeated by the defending champion, Magnus. In light of Kai's loss and Seiya Sanada's TNA X Division Championship win, Manabu Soya now felt he had been vindicated in his view of Sanada as the Wrestle-1 ace and began taunting Kai as a "fake ace". The rivalry between Kai and Soya led to a main event grudge match between the two on March 13, where Kai was victorious. On March 22, Kai teamed up with Masayuki Kono and René Duprée, two members of the villainous Desperado stable, to take on Soya, Kaz Hayashi and Shuji Kondo in a six-man tag team match, which ended with Kai scoring another pinfall win over Soya, however, only after he had first been hit with a steel chair by Kono. Kai, however, assured he was not joining Desperado, but on April 17 accidentally cost himself, Hayashi and Kondo a six-man tag team match, where they faced Desperado. Post-match, Kai tried to apologize to his partners, but was again taunted by Soya, which led to a brawl between the two and Kai issuing a challenge for a match, where if Soya lost he would lose his job as the matchmaker, while if Kai lost he could no longer compete in main event matches, effectively surrendering his claim to being the Wrestle-1 ace. On May 4, Kai defeated Soya, forcing him out of the matchmaker position.

Following the match, as Kai once again declared himself the ace of Wrestle-1, he was attacked by Yuji Hino, who had earlier made his own claim for the title. After Hino had left the ring, Masayuki Kono entered, but instead of continuing the assault, the Desperado leader helped Kai backstage. This led to a match on May 22, where Kai defeated Hino, handing him his first direct loss in Wrestle-1. Post-match, Kai once again turned down an offer to join Desperado and was as a result attacked by the stable, only to be saved by Manabu Soya. Kai and Kono faced off in a grudge match on July 6 at Shōgeki: Impact, where Kai's hair and Desperado's future were on the line. In the end, Kai was defeated following outside interference from Desperado and, as a result, was forced to have his head shaved. From July 21 to 30, Kai took part in Pro Wrestling Zero1's 2014 Fire Festival tournament, where he finished at the top of his round-robin block with a record of three wins, one draw and one loss, advancing to the knockout stage. On August 3, Kai defeated Daemon Ueda to advance to the finals of the tournament, where he was defeated by Ryoji Sai later that same day.

On September 22, Kai entered a tournament to crown the first Wrestle-1 Champion, defeating Manabu Soya in his first round match. The following day, Kai defeated Minoru Tanaka to advance to the semifinals of the tournament. On October 8, Kai defeated Shuji Kondo in the semifinals to advance to the finals of the tournament, where, later that same day, he was defeated by Masayuki Kono. On November 15, Kai entered the First Tag League Greatest tournament, set to determine the inaugural Wrestle-1 Tag Team Champions, alongside Ryota Hama under the team name Akatenrou ("Red Sirius"). After losing their opening match against Hiroshi Yamato and Seiya Sanada, Akatenrou came back to win their three other matches, winning their block and advancing to the semifinals. On November 30, Akatenrou was eliminated from the tournament in the semifinals by the eventual tournament winners, Team 246 (Kaz Hayashi and Shuji Kondo).

After admitting at the end of 2014 that he was not qualified to challenge for the Wrestle-1 Championship, Kai announced his goal for 2015; becoming a champion in Wrestle-1. He began the year with two big singles wins over Masakatsu Funaki on January 11 and Masayuki Kono on January 30, starting his climb towards a future title match. After picking up a major win over Pro Wrestling Zero1 representative Masato Tanaka on February 13, Kai announced he was now ready to challenge Keiji Mutoh for the Wrestle-1 Championship. On March 8, Kai defeated Mutoh to become the third Wrestle-1 Champion. Kai's reign ended only 24 days later on April 1, when he was defeated by freelancer Hideki Suzuki in his first title defense. Kai received his rematch against Suzuki on July 12 and defeated him to regain the title and become the first two-time Wrestle-1 Champion. Despite defeating an outsider to regain the title, Kai's win was largely met with boos from the Korakuen Hall audience. On August 2, Kai entered the inaugural Wrestle-1 Grand Prix, which was billed as Wrestle-1's premier tournament, but suffered an upset loss in his opening match against Jiro Kuroshio and was immediately eliminated from the tournament. Afterwards, Keiji Mutoh suggested a fan voting on whether Kai should get to keep his newly won Wrestle-1 Championship. On September 21, Kai lost the Wrestle-1 Championship to the winner of the 2015 Wrestle-1 Grand Prix, Manabu Soya, again ending his reign at his first defense.

Afterwards, Kai adopted Atsushi Onita's "Street Fight Style" by starting to wrestle in a tank top and jeans, while also incorporating hardcore wrestling into his repertoire. On April 6, Kai defeated Masayuki Kono to become the number one contender to the Wrestle-1 Championship, held by Yuji Hino. In the win, Kai debuted a new finishing maneuver, the Gannosuke Clutch. However, since he had not gotten Mr. Gannosuke's blessing to use the hold, he dubbed it Shōtakōnin Gannosuke Clutch ("Shōta Certified Gannosuke Clutch") after another wrestler affiliated with Gannosuke's home promotion, Guts World Pro Wrestling. On April 24, Kai took part in a Guts World event and used the hold to win a six-man tag team match, which also included Mr. Gannosuke. Afterwards, Gannosuke agreed to teach the hold to Kai, who now renamed it Honkekōnin Gannosuke Clutch ("Originator Certified Gannosuke Clutch"). On May 4, Kai used the hold to defeat Yuji Hino and win the Wrestle-1 Championship for the third time. After his win, Kai dubbed himself a "free" champion, stating he would defend the title all over Japan and the world. As part of being a "free" champion, Kai then announced he was taking the title on a tour of promotions such as Big Japan Pro Wrestling (BJW), Ganbare☆Puroresu, Guts World and women's wrestling promotion Ice Ribbon. Kai made his first title defense on June 8 by defeating Shotaro Ashino. On July 3, Kai and Ken Ohka won the DDT Pro-Wrestling promotion's KO-D Tag Team Championship by defeating Daisuke Sasaki and Shuji Ishikawa. On August 11, Kai lost the Wrestle-1 Championship to Daiki Inaba in his second defense. On August 28, Kai and Ohka lost the KO-D Tag Team Championship to Harashima and Yuko Miyamoto in their first defense at DDT's biggest event of the year, Ryōgoku Peter Pan 2016. On September 18, Kai received a rematch for the Wrestle-1 Championship, but was again defeated by Inaba. On December 18, Kai and Yusaku Obata defeated Akebono and Shogun Okamoto in the finals to win Pro Wrestling Zero1's 2016 Furinkazan Tag Tournament. On December 20, it was announced that Kai would be leaving Wrestle-1 and becoming a freelancer at the end of the year.

=== Freelancing (2017–present) ===
Kai wrestled his first match as a freelancer at a Pro Wrestling Zero1 event on January 1, 2017, where he defeated Hartley Jackson. The following day, Kai returned to All Japan Pro Wrestling, announcing he would again start wrestling for the promotion in February with the goal of obtaining the Triple Crown Heavyweight Championship. On February 3, Kai received a shot at Zero1's World Heavyweight Championship, but the match against defending champion Kohei Sato ended in a thirty-minute time limit draw. Kai's AJPW return match took place on February 17, when he and Ryoji Sai defeated Joe Doering and Suwama. On March 2, Kai and Yusaku Obata unsuccessfully challenged Akebono and Shogun Okamoto for the NWA Intercontinental Tag Team Championship. In April, Kai took part in AJPW's 2017 Champion Carnival, where he finished with a record of three wins and three losses. On May 21, Kai and Kengo Mashimo won AJPW's World Tag Team Championship by defeating Bodyguard and Zeus. Later that same day, Kai teamed with Yusaku Obata to defeat Hideki Suzuki and Kohei Sato for Zero1's vacant NWA Intercontinental Tag Team Championship, becoming a triple crown tag team champion in one day (the World Tag Team Championship is made up of two titles). Kai and Mashimo lost the World Tag Team Championship back to Bodyguard and Zeus on June 11. On August 27, Kai replaced an injured Jake Lee and teamed with Naoya Nomura in an attempt to regain the World Tag Team Championship, but the two were defeated by Daisuke Sekimoto and Yuji Okabayashi in a match for the vacant title. Three days later, Kai and Obata were stripped of the NWA Intercontinental Tag Team Championship due to Zero1 being unable to book a title defense for the two because of scheduling conflicts. On October 31, Kai took part in Atsushi Onita's retirement match.

==== Dragon Gate (2018–present) ====
Kai made his debut for Dragon Gate in August 2018, teaming with former partner Hiroshi Yamato to defeated Kagetora and Yosuke Santa Maria. Kai slowly began aligning himself with Yamato and his Tribe Vanguard stable, and in January became a full fledged member of the group. On March 3, Kai and U-T unsuccessfully challenged Big Ben (Big R Shimizu) and Ben-K) for the Open the Twin Gate Championship.

== Personal life ==
Sakai got married in November 2011.

== Championships and accomplishments ==
- All Japan Pro Wrestling
  - World Junior Heavyweight Championship (2 times)
  - World Tag Team Championship (1 time) – with Kengo Mashimo
  - Junior League (2008, 2011)
  - Junior Tag League (2011) – with Kaz Hayashi
  - World's Strongest Tag Determination League (2011) – with Seiya Sanada
  - New Year Openweight Battle Royal (2018)
- Dragon Gate
  - Open the Dream Gate Championship (1 time)
  - Open the Triangle Gate Championship (4 times) — with Ishin and Shun Skywalker (2) and Ishin and Yoshiki Kato (2)
  - Open the Twin Gate Championship (3 times) - with Yamato (1) and BxB Hulk (2)
- DDT Pro-Wrestling
  - KO-D Tag Team Championship (1 time) – with Ken Ohka
- Pro Wrestling Illustrated
  - Ranked No. 50 of the 500 best singles wrestlers in the PWI 500 in 2022
- Pro Wrestling Zero1
  - NWA Intercontinental Tag Team Championship (1 time) – with Yusaku Obata
  - Furinkazan Tag Tournament (2016) – with Yusaku Obata
- Wrestle-1
  - Wrestle-1 Championship (3 times)
  - TNA World Heavyweight Championship Challenger Tournament (2014)
- Wrestling Observer Newsletter
  - Rookie of the Year (2008)
