= Wrestle-1 Championship =

Professional wrestling championship

- The Wrestle-1 Championship belt

Details
- Promotion: Wrestle-1
- Date established: July 21, 2014
- Date retired: April 1, 2020
Statistics
- First champion: Masayuki Kono
- Final champion: Kaz Hayashi
- Most reigns: Kai (3 reigns)
- Longest reign: Shotaro Ashino (359 days)
- Shortest reign: Kaz Hayashi (17 days)
- Oldest champion: Keiji Muto (51 years, 313 days)
- Youngest champion: Shotaro Ashino (27 years, 75 days)
- Heaviest champion: Masayuki Kono (115 kg (254 lb))
- Lightest champion: Daiki Inaba (82 kg (181 lb))

The Wrestle-1 Championship (WRESTLE-1チャンピオンシップ, Wrestle-1 Chanpionshippu) was the top professional wrestling title owned by the Wrestle-1 (W-1) promotion. In Japanese the title's name includes the katakana term for "championship", Chanpionshippu (チャンピオンシップ), derived from the English language instead of the more common kanji term Ōza (王座). The title also does not feature the word "Heavyweight" or any other weight class, indicating an open-weight status de facto.

Like most professional wrestling championships, the title is won as a result of a scripted match. There have been seventeen reigns shared among eleven wrestlers.

== History ==
=== Championship tournament ===
On July 21, 2014, a full year after the start of the promotion, Wrestle-1 announced the creation of its first own title, the Wrestle-1 Championship. Previous Wrestle-1 events had featured matches for championships owned by other promotions like All Star Wrestling (ASW), European Wrestling Promotion (EWP), Pro Wrestling Zero1 and Total Nonstop Action Wrestling (TNA). It was announced that the inaugural champion would be determined in a sixteen-man single-elimination tournament taking place between September 21 and October 8. Wrestle-1's founder Keiji Muto quickly announced that he would not be taking part in the tournament. The tournament brackets were revealed on August 8, with the exception of two participants, who would be determined in qualifying matches on August 31. In the qualifying matches, Jiro Kuroshio defeated Andy Wu and Daiki Inaba defeated Koji Doi. The tournament featured only wrestlers officially signed to Wrestle-1 and none of the freelancers or outside wrestlers working regularly for the promotion. Pro Wrestling Zero1's reigning World Heavyweight Champion Masakatsu Funaki announced he was looking to defend his title throughout the tournament and unifying it with the Wrestle-1 Championship. However, just before the start of the tournament on September 19, Funaki lost the World Heavyweight Championship. The Wrestle-1 Championship belt was unveiled at a press conference on September 17. The first two rounds of the tournament were held over three shows between September 21 and 23 and saw Kai, Masakatsu Funaki, Masayuki Kono and Shuji Kondo advance to set up the two semifinal matches for October 8. In the semifinals, Kai and Kono were victorious over Kondo and Funaki, respectively, setting up a final match later that same day, where Kono defeated Kai to win the tournament and become the inaugural Wrestle-1 Champion.

First round (September 21, 22)
Kai	Pin
Manabu Soya	23:40
Minoru Tanaka	Pin
Daiki Inaba	12:31
Hiroshi Yamato	Pin
Seiki Yoshioka	18:48
Shuji Kondo	Pin
Kaz Hayashi	16:35
Masakatsu Funaki	Sub
Tajiri	03:50
Ryota Hama	Pin
Akira	07:34
Masayuki Kono	Pin
Jiro Kuroshio	04:56
Yasufumi Nakanoue	Pin
Yusuke Kodama	12:32

Second round (September 23)
Kai	Pin
Minoru Tanaka	18:18
Hiroshi Yamato	Pin
Shuji Kondo	15:11
Masakatsu Funaki	Pin
Akira	14:13
Masayuki Kono	Sub
Yusuke Kodama	09:07

Semifinals (October 8)
Kai	Pin
Shuji Kondo	12:50
Masakatsu Funaki	Pin
Masayuki Kono	07:10

Finals (October 8)
Kai	Pin
Masayuki Kono	17:57

== Title history ==
Key
No.	Overall reign number
Reign	Reign number for the specific champion
Days	Number of days held
Defenses	Number of successful defenses
+	Current reign is changing daily

No.	Champion	Championship change			Reign statistics			Notes	Ref.
No.	Champion	Date	Event	Location	Reign	Days	Defenses	Notes	Ref.
1	Masayuki Kono	October 8, 2014	Shodai Ōja Kettei Tournament	Tokyo	1	24	0	Kono defeated Kai in the finals of a sixteen-man tournament to become the inaugural champion.	
2	Keiji Muto	November 1, 2014	Hold Out	Tokyo	1	127	2		
3	Kai	March 8, 2015	Trans Magic	Tokyo	1	24	0		
4	Hideki Suzuki	April 1, 2015	Cherry Blossom	Tokyo	1	102	2		
5	Kai	July 12, 2015	Symbol	Tokyo	2	71	0		
6	Manabu Soya	September 21, 2015	2nd Anniversary	Tokyo	1	111	2		
7	Yuji Hino	January 10, 2016	Sunrise	Tokyo	1	115	2		
8	Kai	May 4, 2016	Triumph	Tokyo	3	99	1		
9	Daiki Inaba	August 11, 2016	Puroresu Love in Yokohama	Yokohama	1	83	1		
10	Masayuki Kono	November 2, 2016	Autumn Bout	Tokyo	2	138	2		
11	Shotaro Ashino	March 20, 2017	Trans Magic	Tokyo	1	359	7		
12	Manabu Soya	March 14, 2018	Trans Magic	Tokyo	2	172	1		
13	Shotaro Ashino	September 2, 2018	Pro Wrestling Love 2018 in Yokohama	Yokohama	2	125	2		
14	T-Hawk	January 5, 2019	Sunrise	Tokyo	1	239	2		
15	Daiki Inaba	September 1, 2019	Puroresu Love in Yokohama	Yokohama	2	133	1		
16	Katsuhiko Nakajima	January 12, 2020	Sunrise	Tokyo	1	63	1		
17	Kaz Hayashi	March 15, 2020	Wrestle Wars 2020	Ota City	1	17	0		
—	Deactivated	April 1, 2020	—	—	—	—	—	Deactivated when Wrestle-1 closed.	

== Combined reigns ==
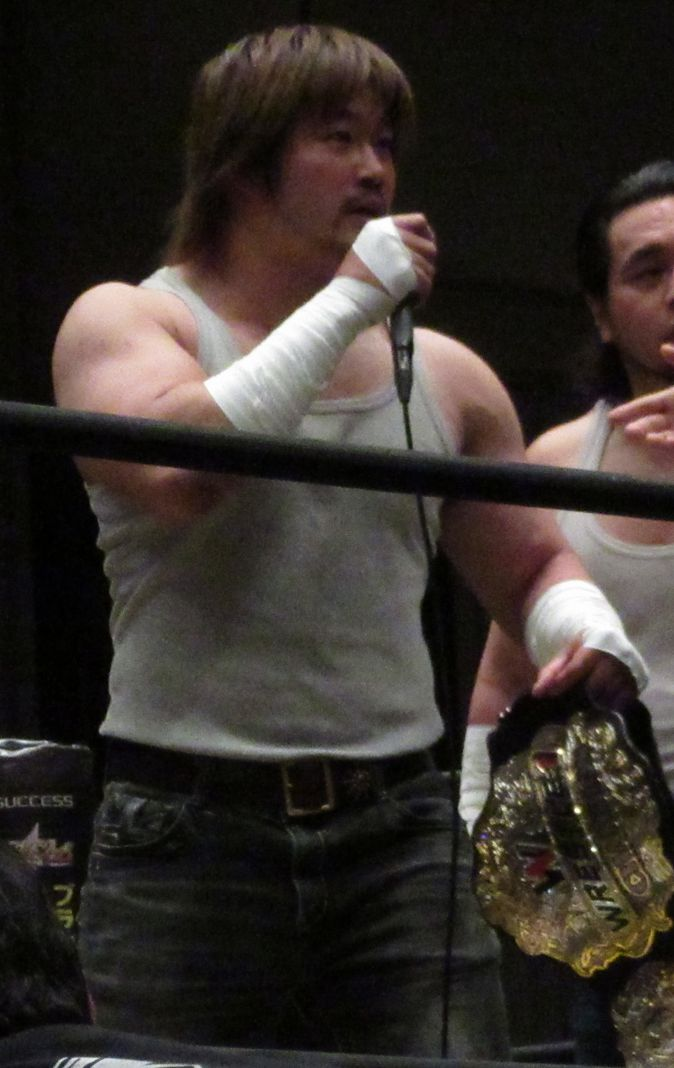
Kai, record three-time Wrestle-1 Champion

Rank	Wrestler	No. of reigns	Combined defenses	Combined days
1	Shotaro Ashino	2	9	484
2	Manabu Soya	2	3	283
3	T-Hawk	1	2	239
4	Daiki Inaba	2	2	216
5	Kai	3	1	194
6	Masayuki Kono	2	2	162
7	Keiji Muto	1	2	127
8	Yuji Hino	1	2	115
9	Hideki Suzuki	1	2	102
10	Katsuhiko Nakajima	1	0	63
11	Kaz Hayashi	1	0	17

== Belt design ==
The standard Championship belt has three plates on a black leather strap.
