= Kaz Hayashi =

Japanese professional wrestler (born 1973)

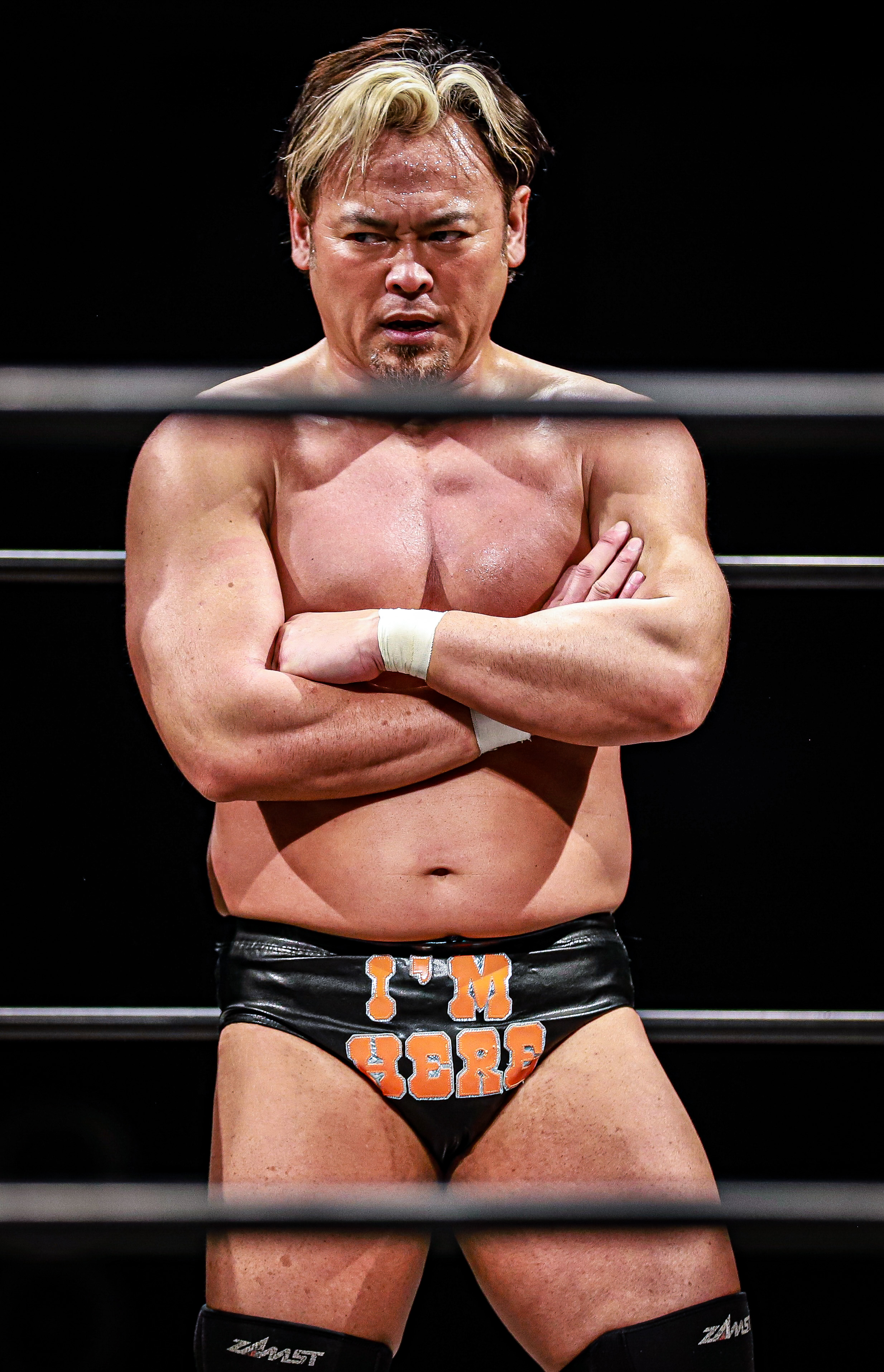
- Hayashi in 2023

Personal information
- Born: Kazuhiro Hayashi (林 和広, Hayashi Kazuhiro); May 18, 1973 (age 53) Setagaya, Tokyo, Japan

Professional wrestling career
- Ring name(s): El Gringo; The Great Hayashi; Kaz Hayashi; Miguel Hayashi Jr. Shiryu
- Billed height: 1.73 m (5 ft 8 in)
- Billed weight: 83 kg (183 lb)
- Trained by: Gran Hamada; Último Dragón
- Debut: November 19, 1992
- Retired: July 1, 2024

Kazuhiro Hayashi (林 和広, Hayashi Kazuhiro; born May 18, 1973), best known by the ring name Kaz Hayashi (カズ・ハヤシ, Kazu Hayashi), is a Japanese business executive and retired professional wrestler who last competed in Gleat and serves as the company's chief technical officer (CTO). He is best known for his work in World Championship Wrestling and All Japan Pro Wrestling (AJPW), where in addition to being a wrestler for the latter promotion, he also served as the head booker for the company's junior heavyweight division. After leaving AJPW in 2013, Hayashi competed for Wrestle-1, where he also worked as a trainer. In April 2017, Hayashi took over as the new president of Wrestle-1, remaining in the position until the promotion's closure in 2020; he was also the promotion's final champion of the Wrestle-1 Championship.

Hayashi retired from in-ring competition in July 2024, and since then has maintained his role as Gleat's chief technical officer.

== Professional wrestling career ==
=== Early career (1992–1997) ===
Hayashi, under a mask as Shiryu (獅龍, Growing Dragon) debuted in 1992 in Universal Lucha Libre promotion in a tag team match, with Terry Boy losing to Mongolian Yuga (also debuting) and Buffalo Chohi. For much of his early career, Hayashi wrestled in Universal's successor promotion, Michinoku Pro Wrestling (Michinoku Pro/MPW). As Shiryu, he was part of the memorable rudo group, Kaientai Deluxe, which waged war with Michinoku Pro's Sekigun for many years, producing some classic matches. In June 1997, he left Michinoku Pro for the Mexican Promo Azteca promotion, before joining World Championship Wrestling (WCW) in the United States in October of that year.

=== World Championship Wrestling (1997–2001) ===
After unmasking, Hayashi joined WCW in 1998. Early on, he was relegated to a jobber and comedy character. He would be taken under the management of Sonny Onoo and even come to inherit Glacier's ceremonial armor and light show for a time. In late 1999, Vince Russo and Ed Ferrara began booking WCW programs and Hayashi was paired with La Parka. During interviews, the two would speak in their native languages which would be humorously dubbed over by charismatic English speakers, calling him names such as "The Kaz Master" and "Kazanova". This ended shortly when La Parka became upset and tossed the microphone down as Ferrera was speaking.

In mid-2000, Hayashi formed the stable The Jung Dragons along with Jamie-San and Yang. Primarily feuding with 3 Count, the Jung Dragons consisted of high-flying cruiserweight talent and gained considerable popularity until the group's demise the following year. During this time, he became friends with Keiji Mutoh, who was appearing in his final run with the promotion under his Great Muta guise.

=== World Wrestling Federation (2001–2002) ===
Hayashi's contract was bought by the World Wrestling Federation (WWF) following their purchase of WCW in early 2001. He was first sent to WWF's developmental territory the Heartland Wrestling Association (HWA) before being moved to the main roster. Hayashi made his WWF main roster debut during the Invasion storyline as a member of The Alliance faction but only made one appearance before returning to HWA and ultimately heading back to Japan.

=== All Japan Pro Wrestling (2002–2013, 2021–2022) ===
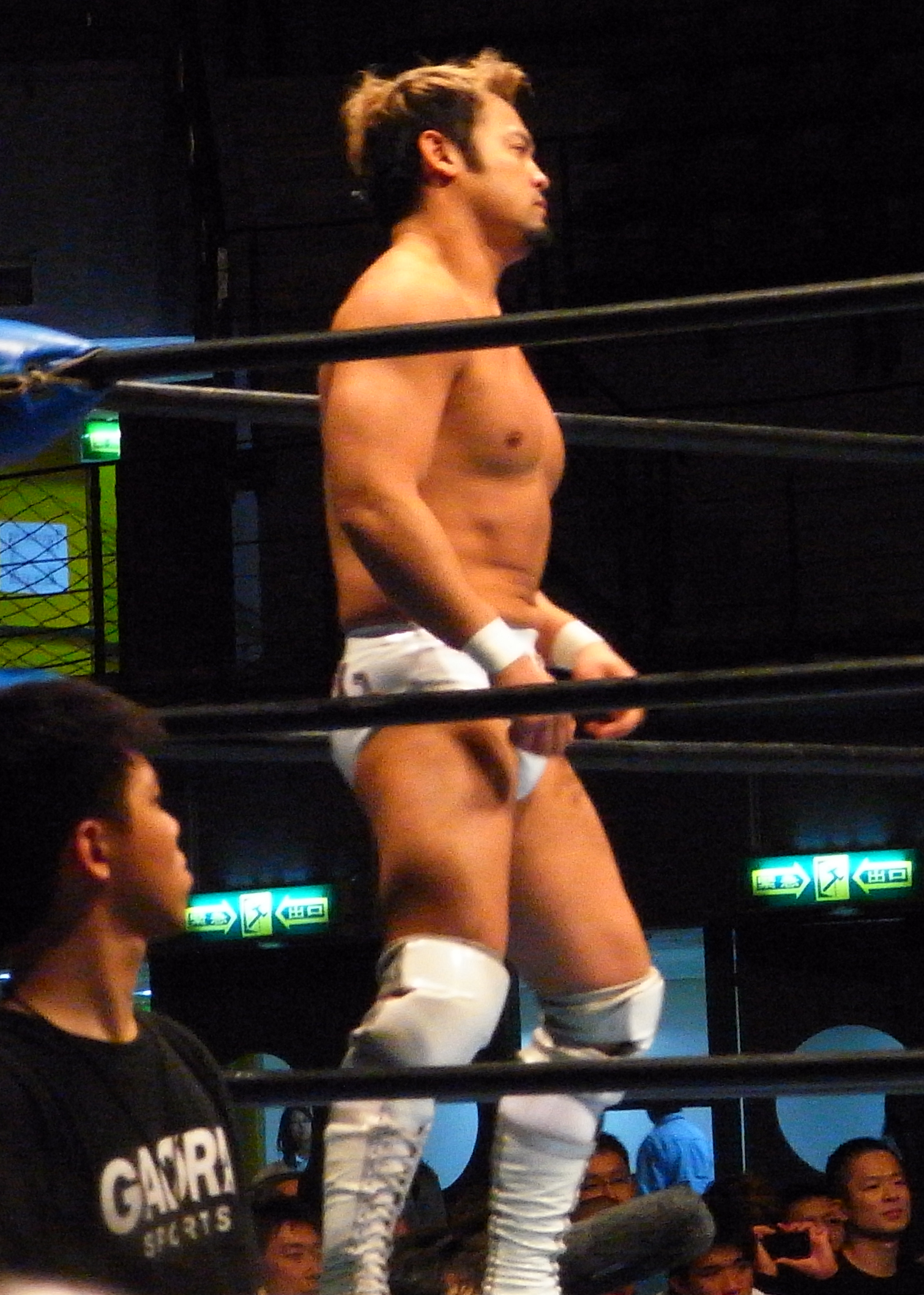
Hayashi in November 2010

After returning to Japan, Hayashi eventually decided to join All Japan Pro Wrestling (AJPW) due to his friendship with Keiji Mutoh and established himself as one of their top stars, winning the World Junior Heavyweight Championship and both the World Tag Team Championship and the All Asia Tag Team Championship with Satoshi Kojima. In 2006, Hayashi won the AJPW Junior League tournament.

Now under the name Miguel Hayashi Jr., Hayashi, PEPE Michinoku, and El NOSAWA Mendoza formed a team during the AJPW Champion Carnival called Mexico Amigos. Nobutaka Araya joined the team after six-man Action between Mexico Amigos and Araya/Fuchi/Hirai at the Carnival's final show.

After multiple bouts against Minoru Suzuki, Nosawa offered Suzuki an invitation into Mexico Amigos, which he declined. This resulted in the group changing multiple assets. Their name was changed to Mexico Amigos Black, the previous worn Mexican Flag attire became Black and Gold attire, and Nobutaka Araya was kicked out of the group. The groups is currently in a heated rivalry with Mazada's Samurai New Japan group, Minoru Suzuki, and Voodoo Murders.

At AJPW's "Fan Appreciation Day" show, The Mexico Amigos teamed with Ray Suzuki and defeated Ryuji Hijikata, Kikutaro, T28 and Ryuji Yamaguchi. After the match, Ray Suzuki revealed himself as Minoru Suzuki and stated that starting next year he would throw his Amigos tights away and return to NOSAWA Rongai, then kidnapped him to start early training. This led to Pepe and Miguel stating they would return to Mexico, but Kaz and Taka would return come the new year. After one last "Viva Mexico", the Mexico Amigos disbanded.

On February 6, 2009, Hayashi defeated Naomichi Marufuji to win the World Junior Heavyweight Championship for a second time. During Hayashi's 23-month reign, he successfully defended the title a record–breaking seventeen times. He would lose the title to Minoru on January 2, 2011.

In June 2013, Hayashi announced his resignation from All Japan in the aftermath of Nobuo Shiraishi taking over as the president and Keiji Mutoh leaving the promotion. Hayashi's final match for the promotion took place on June 30 and saw him and his longtime tag team partner Shuji Kondo, who was also leaving All Japan, unsuccessfully challenge Burning (Atsushi Aoki and Kotaro Suzuki) for the All Asia Tag Team Championship.

Beginning in 2021, following the collapse of Wrestle-1 and in conjunction with his GLEAT appearances, Hayashi began appearing in All Japan sporadically, with a six-man tag team match on October 31 in which he, Koji Iwamoto and Jun Saito lost to Suwama, Shotaro Ashino and Dan Tamura. On May 12, 2024, he challenged titleholder Rising Hayato for the World Junior Heavyweight Championship, but was defeated.

=== Wrestle-1 (2013–2020) ===
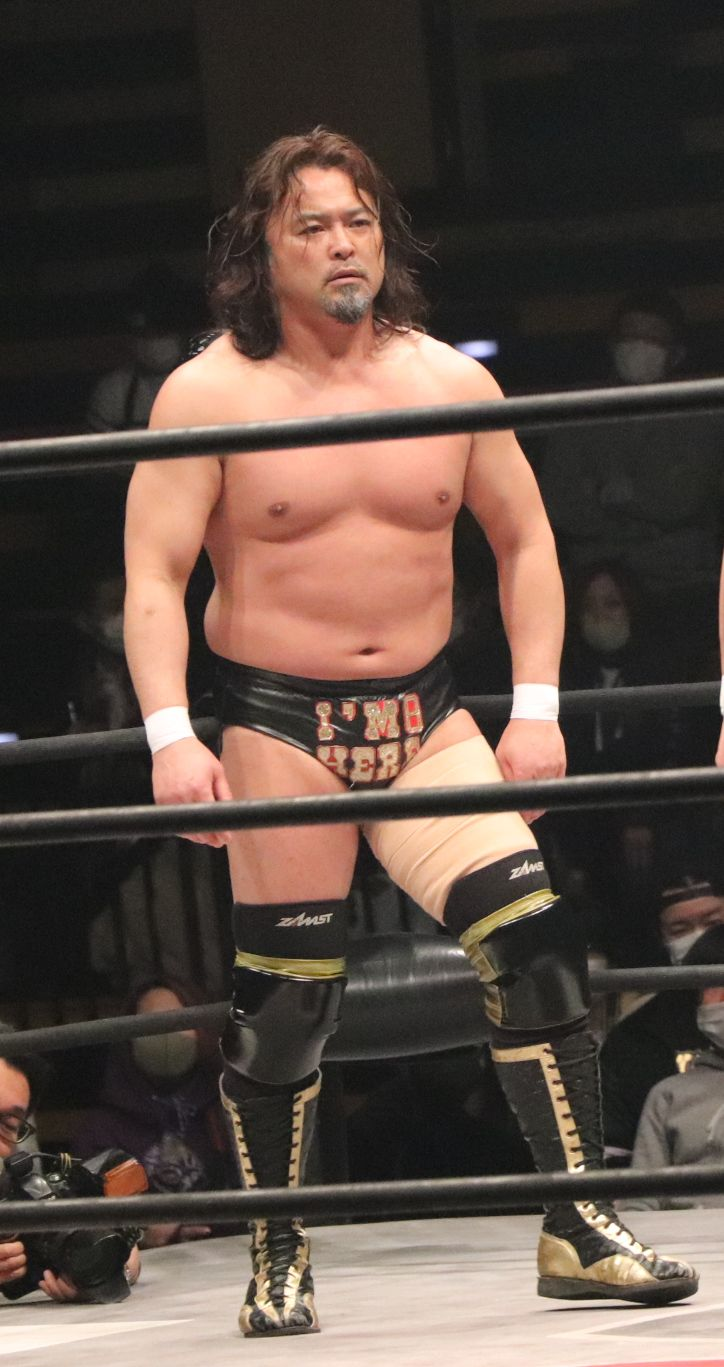
Hayashi in 2020, during one of the last W1 events, Wrestle Wars

On July 10, 2013, Hayashi was announced as part of Keiji Mutoh's new Wrestle-1 promotion. During the promotion's inaugural event on September 8, Hayashi teamed with Shuji Kondo in a tag team match, where they were defeated by the Big Japan Pro Wrestling team of Daisuke Sekimoto and Yuji Okabayashi. As part of a working relationship between Wrestle-1 and American promotion Total Nonstop Action Wrestling (TNA), Hayashi and Kondo earned a shot at the TNA World Tag Team Championship by defeating Desperado (Kazma Sakamoto and Masayuki Kono) on February 15, 2014. On March 2 at Kaisen: Outbreak, Hayashi and Kondo unsuccessfully challenged The Wolves (Davey Richards and Eddie Edwards) for the TNA World Tag Team Championship in a three-way match, which also included The BroMans (Jessie Godderz and Robbie E), who went on to win the match and become the new champions. On September 22, Hayashi entered the Wrestle-1 Championship tournament, but was defeated in his first round match by Kondo. On October 12, Hayashi worked TNA's Bound for Glory event in Tokyo, unsuccessfully challenging Samoa Joe for the TNA X Division Championship in a three-way match, which also included Low Ki. In November, Hayashi and Kondo took part in the First Tag League Greatest tournament, set to determine the inaugural Wrestle-1 Tag Team Champions, where they finished second in their block with a record of three wins and one loss, advancing to the semifinals. On November 30, Hayashi and Kondo first defeated Kai and Ryota Hama in the semifinals and then Akira and Manabu Soya in the finals to win the tournament and become the inaugural Wrestle-1 Tag Team Champions. After seven successful title defenses, they lost the title to Soya and Jun Kasai on July 12, 2015. On October 9, Kondo broke off his partnership with Hayashi. On January 31, 2016, Hayashi, Minoru Tanaka and Tajiri won the vacant UWA World Trios Championship. They lost the title to Andy Wu, Daiki Inaba and Seiki Yoshioka in their fifth defense on July 29. On September 18, Hayashi and Kotaro Suzuki won the vacant Wrestle-1 Tag Team Championship. They lost the title to Koji Doi and Kumagoro on March 20, 2017.

On March 27, 2017, it was announced that Hayashi would become Wrestle-1's new president on April 1 with Shuji Kondo as his vice president. Wrestle-1 ran its final event on April 1, 2020.

=== Gleat (2020–2024) ===
In August 2020, it was announced that Hayashi was joining Gleat as the promotion's Chief Technical Officer. On December 30, 2023, Hayashi announced that he will retire on the promotion's third anniversary show on July 1, 2024. On March 13, 2024, Hayashi won what was his final championship, the G-Infinity Championship with Cima, defeating Seiki Yoshioka and T-Hawk in a tournament final to win the vacant titles. He lost the titles on July 1, 2024 to Tetsuya Izuchi and Kaito Ishida in his retirement bout.

== Championships and accomplishments ==
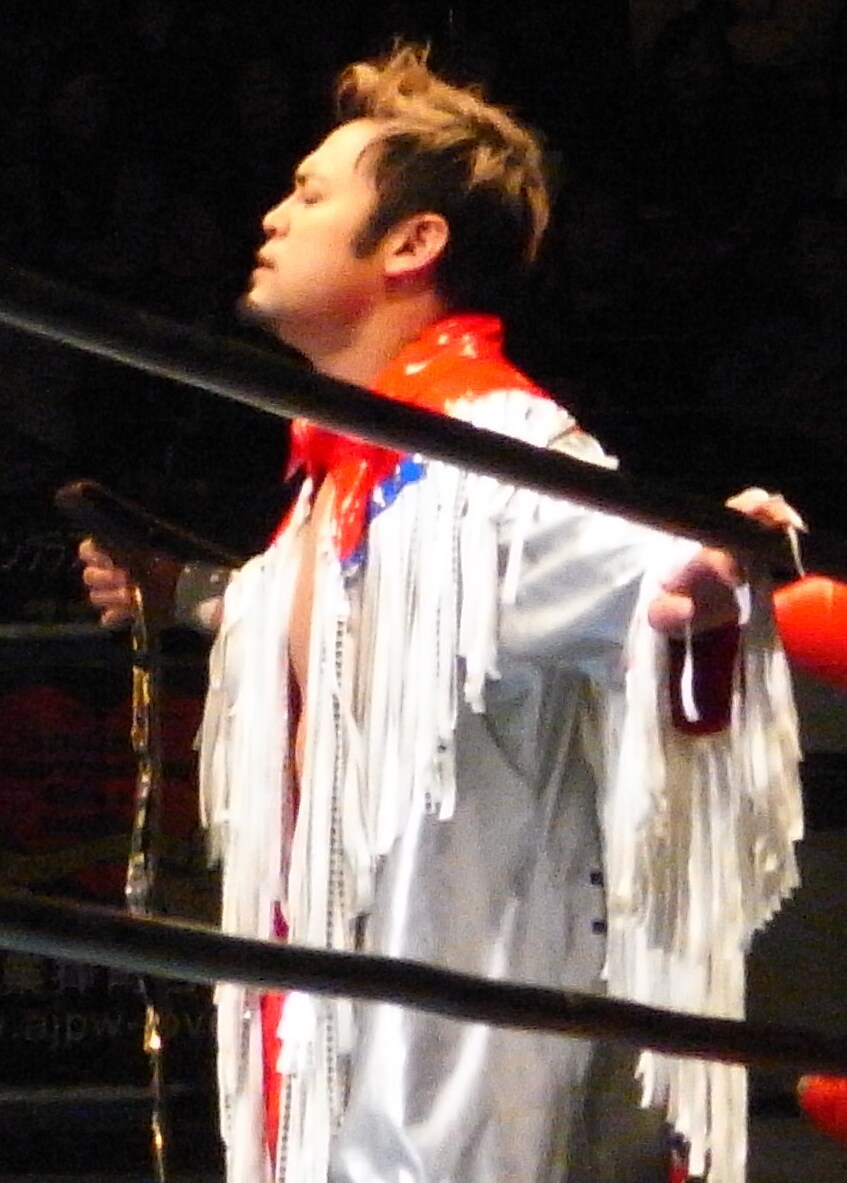
Hayashi is a two-time World Junior Heavyweight Champion in AJPW.

- All Japan Pro Wrestling
  - All Asia Tag Team Championship (1 time) – with The Great Kosuke
  - World Junior Heavyweight Championship (2 times)
  - World Tag Team Championship (1 time) – with Satoshi Kojima
  - AJPW Junior League (2006)
  - AJPW Junior Tag League (2011) – with KAI
  - AJPW Junior Tag League (2012) – with Shuji Kondo
  - World's Strongest Junior Tag League (2002) - with Jimmy Yang
  - World's Strongest Tag Determination League (2003) – with Satoshi Kojima
  - Giant Baba Six Man Cup (2002) - with Keiji Mutoh & George Hines
  - January 3 Korakuen Hall Junior Heavyweight Battle Royal (2004, 2008)
- Gleat
  - G-Infinity Championship (1 time) – with Cima
  - G-Infinity Title Tournament (2024) with – Cima
- Kaientai Dojo
  - Strongest-K Championship (1 time)
- Michinoku Pro Wrestling
  - Central American Middleweight Championship (1 time)
- Pro Wrestling Illustrated
  - PWI ranked him #55 of the top 500 singles wrestlers in the PWI 500 in 2006
- Pro Wrestling ZERO1-MAX
  - NWA International Lightweight Tag Team Championship (1 time) – with Leonardo Spanky
- Tokyo Gurentai
  - Tokyo Intercontinental Tag Team Championship (1 time) – with Dick Togo
  - Tokyo World Heavyweight Championship (1 time)
- Pro Wrestling Heat Up
  - Heat Up Universal Tag Team Championship (1 time) – with Soma Watanabe
- Tokyo Sports
  - Technique Award (2010)
- Wrestle-1
  - UWA World Trios Championship (3 times) – with Minoru Tanaka and Tajiri (1), Masayuki Kono and Shuji Kondo (1), and Manabu Soya and Shuji Kondo (1)
  - Wrestle-1 Tag Team Championship (3 times) – with Shuji Kondo (2) and Kotaro Suzuki (1)
  - Tag League Greatest (2014) – with Shuji Kondo
  - Wrestle-1 Championship (1 time, final)
