= Manabu Soya =

Japanese professional wrestler

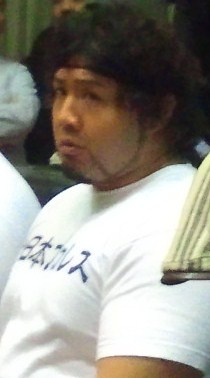
- Soya in April 2011

Personal information
- Born: Manabu Soya (征矢 学, Soya Manabu); December 23, 1984 (age 41) Minowa, Nagano

Professional wrestling career
- Ring name: Manabu Soya
- Billed height: 1.80 m (5 ft 11 in)
- Billed weight: 108 kg (238 lb)
- Trained by: Seiji Sakaguchi; Scott D'Amore; Osamu Nishimura
- Debut: April 11, 2007

Manabu Soya (征矢 学, Soya Manabu; born December 23, 1984) is a Japanese professional wrestler. He is currently signed to Pro Wrestling NOAH. He is best known for his work in All Japan Pro Wrestling, and he previously lived in Canada training at the Can-Am Wrestling School under Scott D'Amore, working regularly for the Maximum Pro Wrestling promotion.

== Professional wrestling career ==
=== MUGA (2007) ===
Soya debuted in MUGA as Osamu Nishimura's pupil, losing to Katsushi Takemura on April 11. Over the next few days however Soya reached a five-minute draw with Yutaka Yoshie, Katsushi Takemura, and Nobuyuki Kurashima On July 1 Soya got a match against Tatsumi Fujinami himself, but Fujinami would have little trouble putting him away. In October Soya and Nishimura would leave MUGA for All Japan Pro Wrestling, and Soya would join the other All Japan dojo mates (such as T28 and Seiya Sanada).

=== All Japan Pro Wrestling (2007-2014) ===
Soya teamed with Sanada for much of the year in the mid-card, as they gained valuable experience wrestling against the Voodoo Murders. He did not take part in any of the tournaments, but he showed that perhaps he is the head of his class when he defeated Sanada convincingly at the November Sumo Hall event. In the World's Strongest Tag Determination League he teamed with Sanada, but the pair would come in last place.

After starting the year continuing with his mentor Nishimura, things didn't stay that way as Soya switched over to team with Nishimura's old nemesis Riki Choshu. Starting the year Nishimura and Soya wrestled together in the mid-card, but unlike Sanada he did not take part in the Champion Carnival. After teaming with Nishimura at Sumo Hall and losing to Choshu and Koshinaka, soon thereafter Soya decided he had had enough of MUGA and switched to Choshu-ism. After teaming off and on during the fall (whenever Choshu was in All Japan), the pair teamed in the World's Strongest Tag Determination League, and they did very well as they came in 4th place including a big win over All Asia Tag Team Champions Akebono and Ryota Hama. Near the end of the year, Soya left Japan to train under Scott D'Amore at the Can-Am Wrestling School. He also began appearing on Ontario independent shows.

In Canada for the beginning of 2010, Soya has become a regular of the independent circuit in Ontario, most notably Maximum Pro Wrestling. After returning to Japan, Soya teamed up with Seiya Sanada and on August 29, 2010, they defeated the Voodoo Murders (Big Daddy Voodoo and TARU) to win the All Asia Tag Team Championship for the first time. They would lose the title to Daisuke Sekimoto and Yuji Okabayashi on March 21, 2011.

In late 2011 to early 2012 Manabu Soya and All Japan veteran Takao Omori formed the team "GET WILD". On March 20, 2012, Soya and Omori defeated Dark Cuervo and Dark Ozz to win the World Tag Team Championship. After losing the title to Joe Doering and Seiya Sanada on May 20, Soya and Omori regained the title on June 17. They vacated the title on October 30, in time for the 2012 World's Strongest Tag Determination League. They then won Block A defeating the team of Turmeric Storm (Tomoaki Honma and Kazushi Miyamoto). They got to the finals defeating Last Revolution (Joe Doering and Suwama) to win 2012's World Strongest Tag Determination League and to become the 64th generation World Tag Team Champions. On December 11, Soya unsuccessfully challenged Masakatsu Funaki for the Triple Crown Heavyweight Championship. As a result, Get Wild was forced to disband, despite still holding the World Tag Team Championship. Get Wild went on to lose the title to Burning (Go Shiozaki and Jun Akiyama) on March 17, 2013. Following the loss, Soya was sidelined with a cervical hernia and an oculomotor nerve palsy. Soya underwent eye surgery on May 29 and shoulder surgery on June 12. While still sidelined from in-ring action, Soya held a press conference on December 27, 2013, to announce his resignation from All Japan.

=== Wrestle-1 (2014-2020) ===
On January 12, 2014, Soya made his debut for Keiji Mutoh's All Japan splinter promotion Wrestle-1, in an on-screen matchmaker role. Soya was portrayed as a biased authority figure, favoring former tag team partner Seiya Sanada. On February 15, Soya made a surprise in-ring return for a twenty-man battle royal, helping Sanada win the match to become the number one contender to the TNA X Division Championship. Soya wrestled his official return match at a Wrestle-1 event on February 21, losing to Masayuki Kono. On May 4, Soya was defeated by Kai in a grudge match and, as a result, lost his job as the matchmaker of Wrestle-1. On August 8, Wrestle-1 announced Soya had signed with the promotion, ending his days as a freelancer. On September 22, Soya entered the Wrestle-1 Championship tournament, but was defeated in his first round match by Kai. In mid-2014, Soya entered a storyline, where he began accusing Akira of being a spy for the villainous Desperado stable. However, on November 1, after it had been revealed that Soya had been wrong and Tajiri had been the spy, Soya and Akira formed a new version of Get Wild, later named "new Wild order". Later that same month, new Wild order took part in the First Tag League Greatest tournament, set to determine the inaugural Wrestle-1 Tag Team Champions, where they finished second in their block with a record of two wins, one draw and one loss, advancing to the semifinals. On November 30, new Wild order defeated Masayuki Kono and Tajiri to advance to the finals of the tournament, where, later that same day, they were defeated by Kaz Hayashi and Shuji Kondo. Following the tournament, Wrestle-1 quickly set up a rematch between the two finalist teams, but Soya and Akira were again defeated in the title rematch on December 7. On January 30, 2015, Soya received his first shot at the Wrestle-1 Championship, but was defeated by the defending champion, Keiji Mutoh. On April 1, new Wild order received another shot at the Wrestle-1 Tag Team Championship, but were for the third time defeated by Hayashi and Kondo. Following the loss, Soya and Akira announced they were looking for new members to join new Wild order. This led to an evaluation match on June 18, after which Jun Kasai and rookie Kumagoro were accepted as the third and fourth members of new Wild order, turning it from a tag team into a stable. On July 12, Soya and Kasai defeated Hayashi and Kondo to win the Wrestle-1 Tag Team Championship. On August 30, Soya defeated Shuji Kondo in the finals to win the 2015 Wrestle-1 Grand Prix. On September 21, Soya defeated Kai to win the Wrestle-1 Championship. On November 27, Soya and Kasai lost the Wrestle-1 Tag Team Championship to Masayuki Kono and Shuji Kondo. On January 10, 2016, Soya lost the Wrestle-1 Championship to Yuji Hino. On July 1, Soya won his second Wrestle-1 Grand Prix in a row, defeating Hino in the finals. On July 29, Soya and Kasai won the Wrestle-1 Tag Team Championship for the second time. After Soya had been sidelined with a shoulder injury, he and Kasai were stripped of the title on August 20. On December 18, the reunited Get Wild defeated Jake Lee and Kento Miyahara in the finals to win All Japan's 2016 World's Strongest Tag Determination League.

=== Pro Wrestling Noah (2020–Present) ===
On April 19, 2020, Manabu Soya made his debut for Pro Wrestling NOAH, being revealed as the newest member of KONGOH, which had previously been teased by its leader Kenoh. On May 3, Soya and the rest of the members of KONGOH and Sugiura-gun faced each other in various matches between them, before facing each other in a twelve-man elimination tag team match, which KONGOH won and would end their feud with Sugiura-gun. In June, Soya took part in the All Four Sides, a tournament to determine the next challenger to the GHC National Championship. In the finals, on June 20, Soya defeated KONGOH stablemate Masa Kitamiya, to become the 1º contender to the GHC National Championship. The following day, Soya unsuccessfully challenged Katsuhiko Nakajima for the GHC National Championship. From September 18 and October 11, Soya took part in the 2020 N-1 Victory, finishing the tournament with a record of two wins, and three losses, failing to advance to the finals. On June 30, 2021, following the breakup of The Aggression, Soya was chosen by his stablemate Katsuhiko Nakajima to face Masa Kitamiya and Kaito Kiyomiya for the vacant GHC Tag Team Championship. On July 22, Soya and Nakajima were defeated by Kitamiya and Kaito Kiyomiya in the match for the vacant titles. In September, Soya took part in the 2021 N-1 Victory, losing all of his qualifying matches, failing to advance to the semifinals of the tournament.

On March 21, 2023, Soya returned to AJPW, alongside KONGOH stablemate Kenoh defeating Naoya Nomura and Yuma Aoyagi to win World Tag Team Championship. From April 8 and May 7, Soya took part in the 2023 Champion Carnival, finishing the tournament with a record of four wins and three losses, failing to advance to the finals of the tournament. On June 15, Soya and Kenoh lost the World Tag Team Championship to Kento Miyahara and Yuma Aoyagi. On June 24, at Kenoh 15th Anniversary Show, KONGOH faced Naomichi Marufuji, Masato Tanaka, Kazushi Sakuraba, AMAKUSA and Alejandro in a winning effort. Afterwards, Kenoh decided to disband the stable, having informed the members of the stable of the decision beforehand. In August, Soya took part in the 2023 N-1 Victory, finishing the tournament with a record of four wins, two losses, and a draw against Go Shiozaki in their head-to-head match, meaning that both finished leveled on points in their block. This led to NOAH setting up a rematch between them to decide, who would advance to the finals, which Soya lost on August 27.

On October 28 at Demolition Stage In Fukuoka, Soya challenged former KONGOH stablemate Kenoh to a title match for the GHC Heavyweight Championship for the third time, after he had won the title, setting up their match at The New Year, on January 2, 2024, which he lost. From February 24 to March 10, Soya and Shuji Kondo took part in the 2024 Victory Challenge Tag League. They finished the tournament with a record of two wins, four losses, and a draw, failing to advance to the finals of the tournament. Shortly after, Soya was sidelined with cubital tunnel syndrome, leading him to make his return on June 16 at Grand Ship In Yokohama, announcing his in ring return to competition on July 13 at Destination 2024. In August, Soya took part in the 2024 N-1 Victory, finishing the tournament with a record of five wins and two losses, failing to advance to the finals of the tournament.

On September 14, Soya defeated Ulka Sasaki to win the GHC National Championship. He lost the title to Tetsuya Endo on January 11, 2025, following the interference from Team 2000 X, before regaining it on February 11. After the match, he was attacked by Team 2000 X, before being saved by RATEL'S. He was subsequently added to the stable, becoming RATEL'S first heavyweight member. Shortly after, the stable was renamed to Passionate RATEL'S, following Soya's addition. Later that night, Soya challenged OZAWA to a title match for the GHC Heavyweight Championship, offering to put his belt on the line in a double title match. This led to a Winner Takes All Lumberjack Deathmatch, on March 2 at Memorial Voyage in Yokohama, where Soya lost GHC National Championship and unsuccessfully challenged OZAWA for the GHC Heavyweight Championship, after Tadasuke turned on him and Passionate RATEL'S and joined Team 2000 X.

== Personal life ==
Soya's younger brother Takumi is a former professional wrestler, having worked for All Japan from January 2011 to May 2012.

On 16 September 2023, Soya revealed that he is married to Joshi professional wrestler, Koharu Hinata, with the couple made their marriage public on Soya's first video on his YouTube channel. Several days later on 23 September 2023, Soya and Hinata also revealed that they have a son.

== Championships and accomplishments ==
- All Japan Pro Wrestling
  - All Asia Tag Team Championship (2 times) – with Seiya Sanada
  - World Tag Team Championship (4 times) – with Takao Omori (3) and Kenoh (1)
  - World's Strongest Tag Determination League (2012, 2016) – with Takao Omori
  - F-1 Tag Team Championship (1 time) – with RG^{1}
  - January 2 New Year's Heavyweight Battle Royal (2012)
- Big Japan Pro Wrestling
  - BJW World Strong Heavyweight Championship (1 time)
- Nikkan Sports
  - Best Tag Team Award (2012) with Takao Omori
- Pro Wrestling Noah
  - GHC National Championship (2 times)
  - GHC Tag Team Championship (2 times, current) – with Daiki Inaba (1) and Yuki Iino (1)
  - Global Tag League (2026) – with Yuki Iino
- Pro Wrestling Illustrated
  - Ranked No. 139 of the top 500 wrestlers in the PWI 500 in 2013 and 2025
- Tokyo Sports
  - Best Tag Team Award (2012) – with Takao Omori
- Wrestle-1
  - UWA World Trios Championship (2 times) – with Kaz Hayashi and Shuji Kondo (1), and Ganseki Tanaka and Nosawa Rongai (1)
  - Wrestle-1 Championship (2 times)
  - Wrestle-1 Tag Team Championship (3 times) – with Jun Kasai (2) and Akira (1)
  - Wrestle-1 Grand Prix (2015, 2016)

^{1}Championship not officially recognized by All Japan Pro Wrestling.
