= El Hijo del Pantera =

Mexican luchador (born 1991)

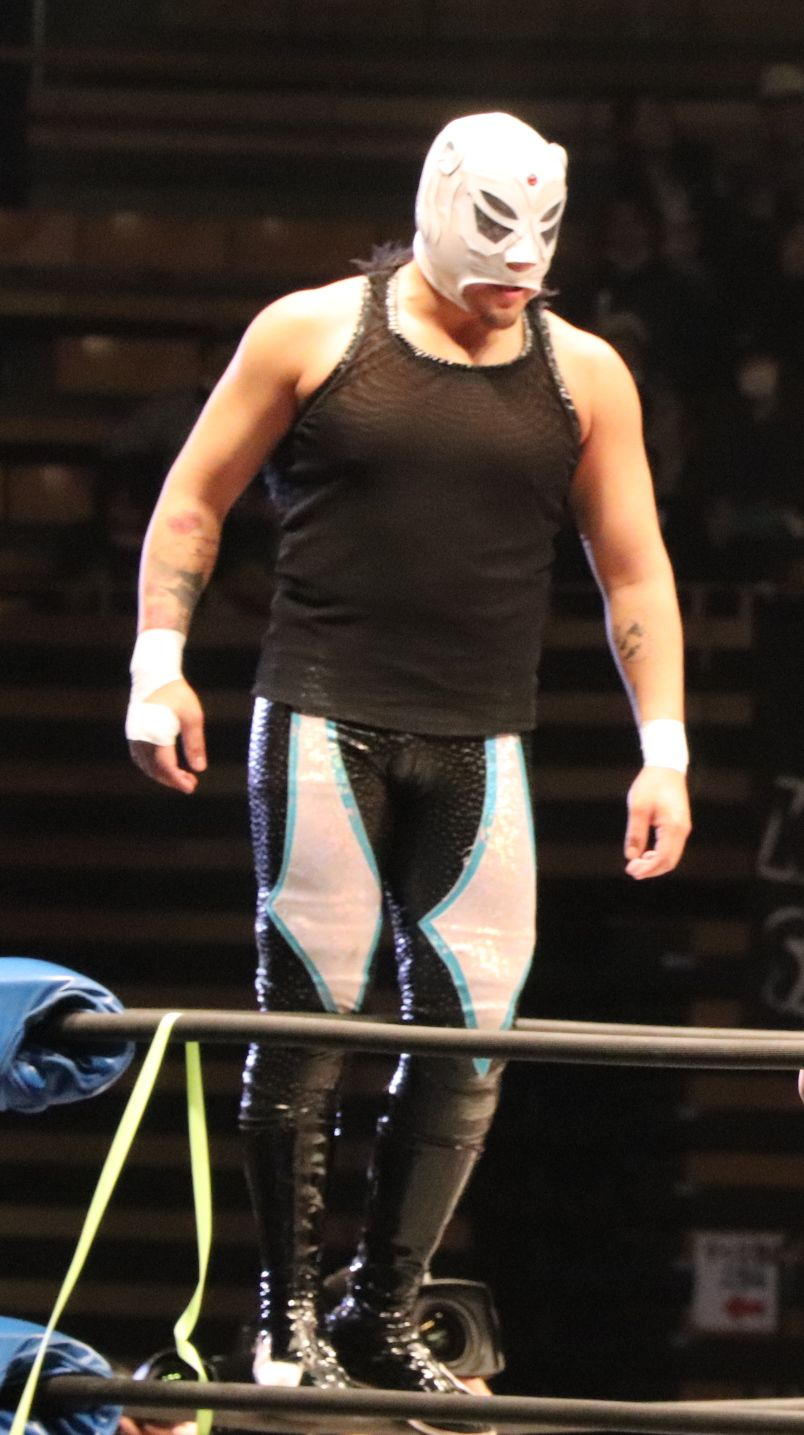
- El Hijo del Pantera at Wrestle Wars 2020, one of W-1's last events

Personal information
- Born: December 18, 1991 (age 34) Mexico

Professional wrestling career
- Ring name(s): El Hijo del Pantera; Dinamita Kid
- Billed height: 1.73 m (5 ft 8 in)
- Billed weight: 80 kg (180 lb)
- Trained by: Black Terry; Akira Nogami; Yoshihiro Tajiri
- Debut: July 31, 2008

El Hijo del Pantera (born December 18, 1991) is a Mexican professional wrestler, who currently wrestles on the independent circuit in the country. He also wrestled in Japanese promotion Pro Wrestling Noah. He is best known for his time with Wrestle-1. His real name is not a matter of public record, as is often the case with masked wrestlers in Mexico, where their private lives are kept a secret from the wrestling fans. El Hijo del Pantera is the cousin of professional wrestler Último Gladiador, the son of Pantera, and the brother of Pantera Jr.

== Professional wrestling career ==
On October 6, 2013, El Hijo del Pantera debuted for Wrestle-1 (W-1), defeating Daiki Inaba. On November 16, Andy Wu debuted for W-1, teaming with Inaba and El Hijo del Pantera to defeat Hiroshi Yamato, Mazada and Nosawa Rongai. From his debut, Wu feuded with Tokyo Gurentai's Mazada and regularly teamed with El Hijo del Pantera. Wu and El Hijo del Pantera moved onto feuding with Novus, a stable off wrestlers from the defunct Wrestling New Classic (WNC). At Total Nonstop Action Wrestling's Bound for Glory, Wu and El Hijo del Pantera lost to Jiro Kuroshio and Yusuke Kodama. On February 13, 2015, after Wu and El Hijo del Pantera lost to Kazma Sakamoto and Koji Doi, the pair argued which ultimately led to El Hijo del Pantera joining the Desperado stable. They briefly feuded; El Hijo del Pantera defeated Wu in the opening round of the tournament to crown the first Wrestle-1 Cruiser Division Champion, but it came to an end on June 20 when the pair shook hands after Wu defeated El Hijo del Pantera.

On July 19, Los Panteras, who consisted of El Hijo del Pantera and his father El Pantera, defeated Hijo de Máscara Año 2000 and Universo 2000 Jr. in the finals of an eight-team tournament to win the vacant IWRG Intercontinental Tag Team Championship. On September 16, they lost the IWRG tag team titles to Los Gringos VIP (Apolo Estrada Jr. and El Hijo del Diablo) in a Steel cage match that also included Los Traumas. Los Panteras regained the titles from Los Gringos VIP on November 22. They held the titles until September 16, 2016 when they lost them to Chicano and Veneno.

In May 2018, El Hijo del Pantera returned to Wrestle-1 and teamed with Andy Wu and Alejandro to unsuccessfully challenge Tokyo Gurentai for the UWA World Trios Championship. He also participated in the 2018 Global Junior Heavyweight Tag League, where he teamed up with Ricky Marvin and competing against teams as Ikuto Hidaka and Takuya Sugawara, and Junta Miyawaki and Seiya Morohashi, finishing with six points. From September 18 to October 24, Wu and El Hijo del Pantera participated in the 2018 Wrestle-1 Tag League but failed to win their block. After successful defending his Wrestle-1 Cruiser Division Championship against El Lindaman on May 13, Wu lost the title to his friend and tag team partner El Hijo del Pantera on September 1. On December 26, El Hijo del Pantera lost the title to Seiki Yoshioka.

On February 29, 2020, Wrestle-1 announced that they would be holding their final event on April 1, with all members of the roster being released from their contracts the day prior. As a result of the pandemic, El Hijo del Pantera returned to Mexico, where he has competed in the Welcome to Mi Barrio, International Wrestling Revolution Group and Consejo Mundial de Lucha Libre.

== Championships and accomplishments ==
- International Wrestling Revolution Group

- IWRG Intercontinental Tag Team Championship (2 times) – with Pantera (2)

- Wrestle-1

- Wrestle-1 Cruiser Division Championship (1 time)

- Welcome To Mi Barrio

- Barrio Bravo Tag Team Championship (1 time) – with Pantera Jr

== Luchas de Apuestas record ==
Winner (wager)	Loser (wager)	Location	Event	Date	Notes
El Hijo del Pantera (mask)	Mazada (hair)	Korakuen Hall - Bunkyō, Tokyo	Live event	October 31, 2013	
