= Andy Wu (wrestler) =

Japanese professional wrestler

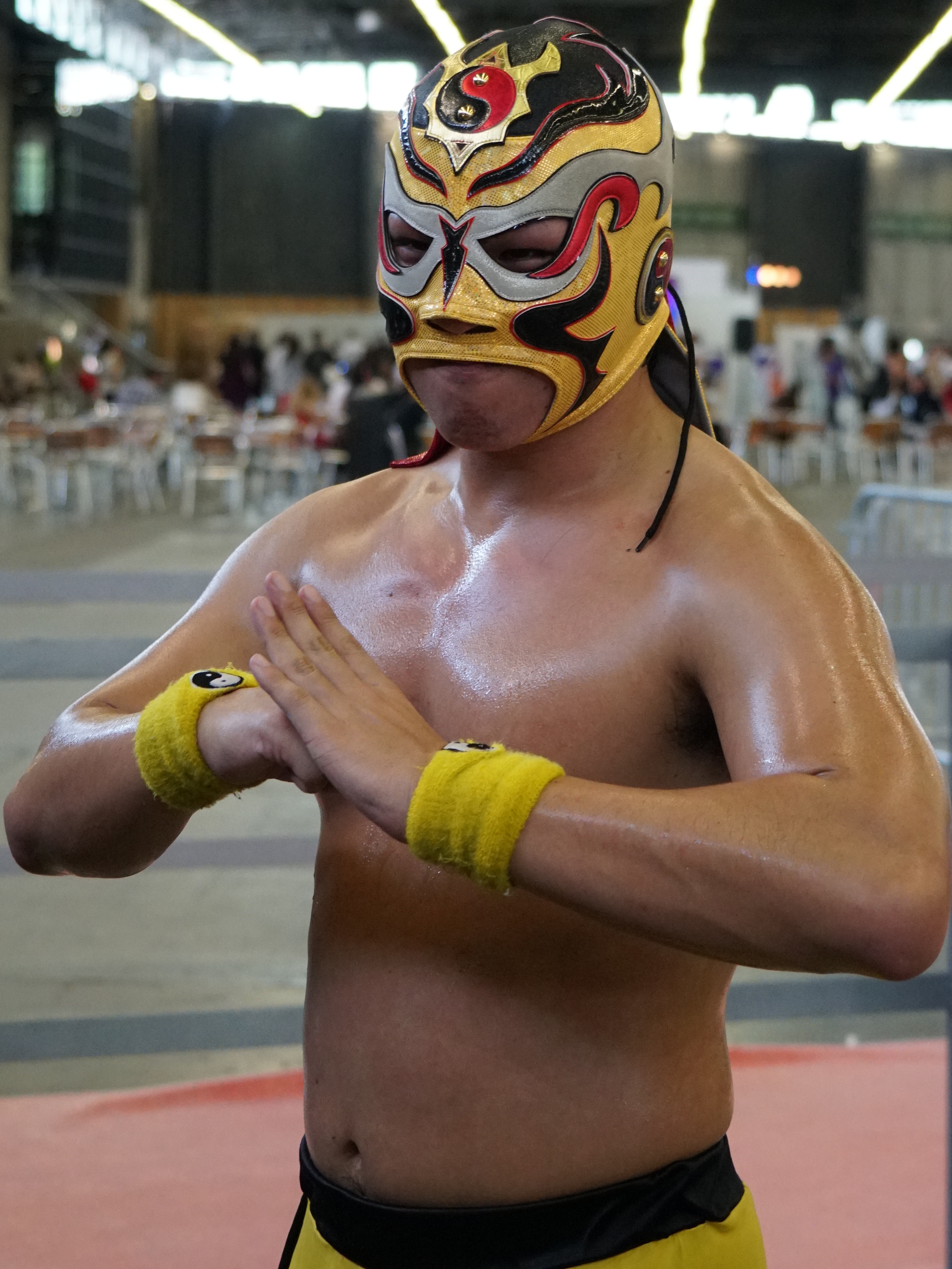
- Andy Wu in 2017

Personal information
- Born: Amagasaki, Hyogo, Japan

Professional wrestling career
- Billed height: 5 ft 7 in (1.70 m)
- Billed weight: 176 lb (80 kg)
- Billed from: Japan
- Trained by: Kaz Hayashi; El Pantera; All Japan Pro Wrestling Dojo
- Debut: July 15, 2012

Andy Wu (アンディ・ウー, Andi Ū) is a Japanese professional wrestler. He currently performs on the independent circuit. He is best known for his time with Wrestle-1 and All Japan Pro Wrestling (AJPW).

== Professional wrestling career ==
=== All Japan Pro Wrestling (2012–2013) ===
Andy Wu debuted for All Japan Pro Wrestling (AJPW) on July 15, 2012, teaming with Yasufumi Nakanoue in a losing effort against Minoru Tanaka and Gillette. In July, he entered the 2012 Junior Hyper League but finishes with no wins. He also competed in the 2013 Junior Hyper Tag League with Sushi and managed to pick up two wins but would not proceed to the next stage. Afterwards, Wu would go on a learning excursion to Mexico to train under Pantera. He wrestled briefly whilst in Mexico, making rare appearances in Queretaro in the summer and wrestling a dark match for International Wrestling Revolution Group (IWRG) on August 18.

During his time in Mexico, backstage issues led to the resignation of Keiji Mutoh and several other wrestlers effective July 1. When Wu returned to Japan, he would choose to follow Mutoh to Wrestle-1 and not return to AJPW.

=== Wrestle-1 (2013–2020) ===
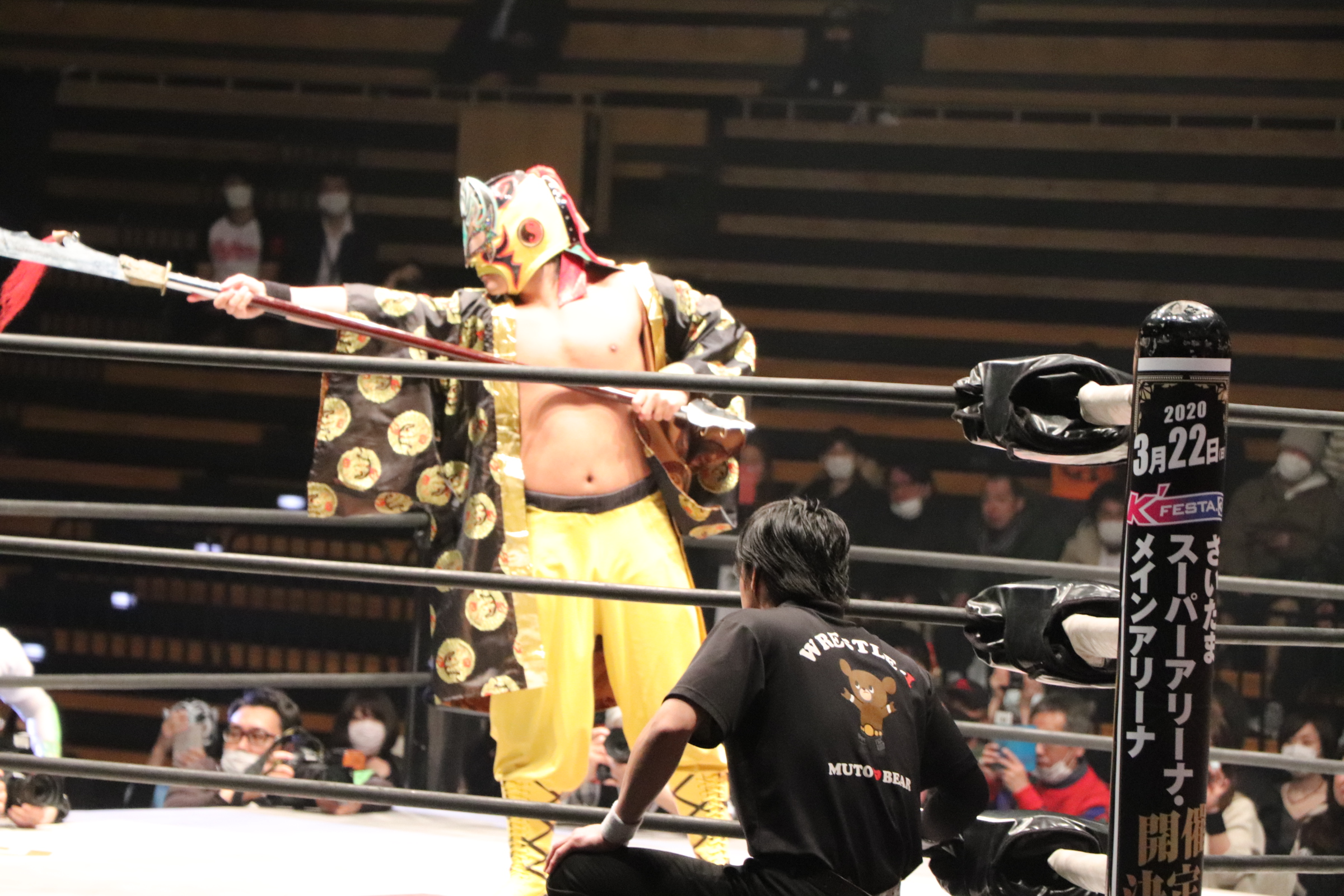
Wu working at Wrestle Wars 2020, one of W1 last events

On November 16, 2013, Wu debuted for Wrestle-1 (W-1), teaming with Daiki Inaba and El Hijo del Pantera to defeat Hiroshi Yamato, Mazada and Nosawa Rongai. From his debut, Wu feuded with Tokyo Gurentai's Mazada and regularly teamed with El Hijo del Pantera. On January 12, 2014, he defeated veteran Mazada in a singles match at Korakuen Hall. At Kaisen: Outbreak, Wu, Inaba and Yamato lost to Tokyo Gurentai. On April 17, Wu defeated Mazada in another Korakuen Hall singles match. On July 6, at Ryōgoku Kokugikan, Wu and Inaba defeated Mazada and Rongai. Wu and El Hijo del Pantera moved onto feuding with Novus, a stable off wrestlers from the defunct Wrestling New Classic (WNC). At Total Nonstop Action Wrestling's Bound for Glory, Wu and El Hijo del Pantera lost to Jiro Kuroshio and Yusuke Kodama. On February 13, 2015, after Wu and El Hijo del Pantera lost to Kazma Sakamoto and Koji Doi, the pair argued which ultimately led to El Hijo del Pantera joining the Desperado stable. They briefly feuded; El Hijo del Pantera defeated Wu in the opening round of the tournament to crown the first Wrestle-1 Cruiser Division Champion, but it came to an end on June 20 when the pair shook hands after Wu defeated El Hijo del Pantera.

On September 23, Wu defeated Minoru Tanaka to win the Wrestle-1 Cruiser Division Championship, the first championship of his career. He made three successful defences before losing the title to Hiroshi Yamato on January 10, 2016. On July 1, Wu unsuccessfully challenged Kotaro Suzuki for the Wrestle-1 Cruiser Division Championship. Wu bounced back 28 days later by winning the UWA World Trios Championship with Daiki Inaba and Seiki Yoshioka. On December 6, the trio along with Jiro Kuroshio, Yusuke Kodama, Kumagoro, Koji Doi and Kohei Fujimura formed New Era, a stable of young wrestlers with the goal to dominate Wrestle-1. Two days later, they lost the UWA World Trios Championship to Jun Kasai, Nosawa Rongai and Shuji Kondo. On April 16, 2017, Wu teamed with Kumagoro and Koji Doi to win back the UWA World Trios Championship for New Era. Three days later, Wu defeated Yoshioka for his second Wrestle-1 Cruiser Division Championship. He lost the title to Mazada on May 4 and also lost the UWA World Trios Championship two days later. Wu regained the Wrestle-1 Cruiser Division Championship on July 16 but it was another short title reign as he lost it to Yoshioka on September 2. Wu reached the finals of the 2018 Wrestle-1 Cruiser Festival but was defeated by fellow New Era member Alejando (formally Kohei Fujimura) on March 14. After infighting and member defections, New Era choose to disband officially on April 19.

In May 2018, El Hijo del Pantera returned to Wrestle-1 and teamed with Wu and Alejandro to unsuccessfully challenge Tokyo Gurentai for the UWA World Trios Championship. From September 18 to October 24, Wu and El Hijo del Pantera participated in the 2018 Wrestle-1 Tag League but failed to win their block. On April 20, 2019, Wu defeated Yusuke Kodama to win a record fourth Wrestle-1 Cruiser Division Championship. After a successful title defence against El Lindaman on May 13, he lost the title to his friend and tag team partner El Hijo del Pantera on September 1.

On February 29, 2020, Wrestle-1 announced that they would be holding their final event on April 1, with all members of the roster being released from their contracts the day prior.

=== Freelance (2020–present) ===
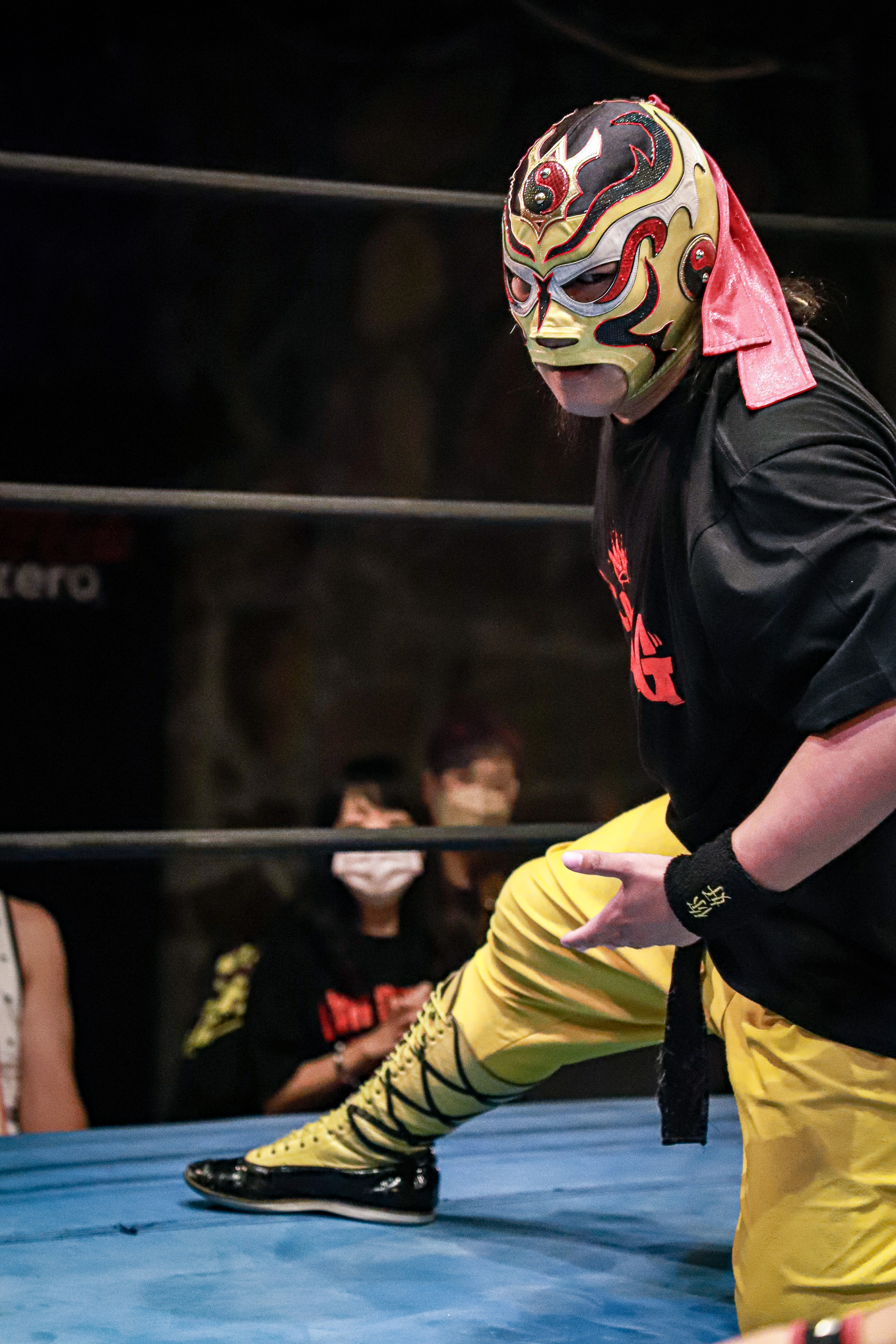
Wu in 2023

Since Wrestle-1's closure, Wu has wrestled most notably for Big Japan Pro Wrestling (BJW) and Pro Wrestling Zero1 (Zero1). On November 23, he unsuccessfully challenged Tatsuhiko Yoshino for the BJW Junior Heavyweight Championship.

== Championships and accomplishments ==
- Big Japan Pro Wrestling

- UWA World Tag Team Championship (1 time) – with Yasufumi Nakanoue

- Colega Pro Wrestling

- King of Colega Championship (1 time)
- King of Colega Tournament (2021)

- Japan Wrestling Entertainment

- JWE Lightweight Championship (1 time, current, inaugural)
- JWE Lightweight Title Tournament (2021)

- Okinawa Pro Wrestling

- Okinawa Pro Wrestling Championship (1 time)

- Wrestle-1

- UWA World Trios Championship (2 times) - with Daiki Inaba and Seiki Yoshioka (1), and Koji Doi and Kumagoro (1)
- Wrestle-1 Cruiser Division Championship (4 times)
