= Seiki Yoshioka =

Japanese professional wrestler

Personal information
- Born: January 5, 1988 (age 38) Kumamoto, Japan

Professional wrestling career
- Ring name(s): Leave Mask #2; Seiki; Seiki Yoshioka
- Billed height: 170 cm (5 ft 7 in)
- Billed weight: 77 kg (170 lb)
- Billed from: Japan
- Trained by: Hanzo; Minoru Tanaka; Kaz Hayashi; Keiji Muto; Shuji Kondo
- Debut: October 5, 2008

Seiki Yoshioka (吉岡 世起, Yoshioka Seiki; born January 5, 1988), previously known as Seiki (stylized in all capital letters), is a Japanese professional wrestler. Yoshioka is known for his time in Wrestle-1, where he was a three-time Wrestle-1 Cruiser Division Champion and UWA World Trios Champion and a one-time NWA International Lightweight Tag Team Champion in Pro Wrestling Zero1. In Wrestle-1, Yoshioka was a member of the #Stronghearts stable, led by Cima. In the past, Yoshioka has also toured Great Britain, as the former one-time All Star Wrestling British Mid-Heavyweight Champion.

== Early life ==
Yoshioka grew up in Kumamoto City, Kumamoto. His father and two older brothers are all doctors. After watching a pro-wrestling video while still in elementary school, he became inspired by Keiji Muto. While in third year of junior high, he learnt about Triple H attempting to recover from a serious quad injury, and was so impressed he decided to become a pro-wrestler. To supplement this, he attended a Taekwondo Dojo while attending Kumamoto Prefectural High School and learnt various techniques. Yoshioka attended Okayama University as it was close to the Wrestle Gate dojo in Hiroshima, and after one unsuccessful attempt, was entered into the college on his second attempt. He started in April 2007 and studied at their Faculty of Pharmaceutical Sciences for 6 years, earning a qualification as a pharmacist.

== Professional wrestling career ==
=== Wrestle Gate (2007-2013) ===
A day after starting at university, Yoshioka began training at Wrestle Gate, run by Hanzo, and would train there whilst also attending school. After nearly a year, Yoshioka was given exhibition matches on Wrestle Gate pre-shows, whilst wearing a mask, On October 5, 2008, he made his official debut teaming with Susumu in a losing effort against Kindaichi Hogo & Minoru Fujita on Wrestle Gate's 5th Anniversary show. Eventually, he changed his ring name to just Seiki (stylized in all capital letters).

In 2011, Seiki won his first belt, winning the Hakata Tag Team Championship (a championship managed by Pro Wrestling Kageki) with Susumu, in a team known as Scramble☆Time. They successfully defended the belts 3 times before losing them to Hanzo & Victory Shanghai. During this time, when All Japan Pro Wrestling (AJPW), DDT Pro-Wrestling (DDT) & Wrestling New Classic (WNC) were in Hiroshima & Okayama, Seiki would occasionally perform on their shows.

Seiki unsuccessfully challenged for the Hakata Light Heavyweight Championship (held by Cosmo Soldier) twice in 2012 while spending that year wrestling his final matches for Wrestle Gate & Pro Wrestling Kageki.

=== All Japan Pro-Wrestling (2013, 2019) ===
In April 2013, after finishing his pharmacist degree, Seiki decided to start wrestling full-time in Tokyo and graduate from Wrestle Gate in Hiroshima. He wrestled his farewell match on May 26, 2013, teaming with Betcha Hogo in a winning effort against Daisuke Masaoka & Yuki Tanaka. He was signed by All Japan Pro-Wrestling on May 1 as Seiki's trainer, Hanzo, is close with Kaz Hayashi who was a senior figure there at the time. Seiki then again started going by his real name Seiki Yoshioka and begun retraining for AJPW.

After only making sporadic appearances since signing with Wrestle-1, Yoshioka wrestled his first full tour in 5 years by participating in the Junior Battle of Glory 2019. Yoshioka finished the league with a record of 3 wins, 1 loss and a draw, advancing to the final, where he was defeated by Koji Iwamoto.

=== Wrestle-1 (2013-2020) ===
In 2013, there was a mass exodus from All Japan Pro-Wrestling after issues with its new ownership, and Yoshioka was one of the many that joined Keiji Muto's new promotion, Wrestle-1 (W-1), He left AJPW on June 30 and transferred to W-1 on July 10. He resumed his re-training, and debuted against Hiroshi Yamato on September 15 in a losing effort.

Yoshioka's first big win came in January 2014 when he pinned Kaz Hayashi in a singles match in just over 6 minutes after a Swanton bomb. On March 2, he and Manabu Soya defeated Ryoji Sai & Kazma Sakamoto in Ryōgoku Kokugikan in an event co-promoted by partner company Total Nonstop Action (TNA). Later that month, Yoshioka won a battle royal to face Seiya Sanada for the TNA X-Division Championship. He would go on to unsuccessfully challenge for the title in a Korakuen Hall main event after Sanada pinned him following a Rounding Body Press. Sanada said that he had 'changed so much in these two weeks'.

On June 22, Yoshioka defeated Jiro 'Ikemen' Kuroshio, then won another battle royal for a title opportunity, this time for All Star Wrestling (ASW)'s British Light Heavyweight Championship. On July 6, in Ryogoku Kokugikan, he defeated Dean Allmark to win the belt with his signature Swanton Bomb. Yoshioka was then immediately sent on a foreign learning excursion to Britain, where he lost the title back to Allmark on August 19 in Rhyl, Wales. After a month, he returned to Japan.

On November 7 on Kassen ~ Battle Zero1vsW-1 Full Battle~ in Shinjuku Face, Yoshioka won Pro Wrestling Zero1 (Zero1)'s NWA International Lightweight Tag Team Championship with Shuji Kondo from Takuya Sugawara and "brother" Yasshi, after Yoshioka pinned Sugawara. Yoshioka entered W-1's First Tag League with Minoru Tanaka, but failed to win the tournament. After one successful defence, Yoshioka & Kondo lost their belts back to Sugawara and Yasshi. After two straight unsuccessful challenges for Minoru Tanaka's Wrestle-1 Cruiser Division Championship, he started teaming with Jiro 'Ikemen' Kushio. This alliance eventually came to include Yasufumi Nakanoue, and the three became known as Jackets, as all three men wore jackets during their matches. They won the UWA World Trios Championship from New Wild Order (Akira, Jun Kasai & Kumagoro) on October 9, 2015, at Wrestle-1 Tour 2015 Fan Appreciation Day in Korakuen Hall. A month later, they lost those titles to Real Desperado (Kazma Sakamoto, Nosawa Rongai & Koji Doi), although they won them straight back less than 30 days later at Wrestle-1 2015 Tour Autumn Bout. Yoshioka unsuccessfully challenged Andy Wu for the Wrestle-1 Cruiserweight Championship on December 24.

On January 7, Jackets would vacate their UWA World Trios belts after Yoshioka couldn't make their next scheduled defence due to cecum surgery. On January 31, Jackets would attempt to regain those belts against Kaz Hayashi, Minoru Tanaka & Tajiri, but lost. On April 28, Yoshioka would team with Nakanoue to challenge Real Desperado (Yuji Hino & Kazma Sakamoto) for their Wrestle-1 Tag Team Championship, but were unsuccessful after Yoshioka was pinned by Hino following a Fucking Bomb. In June, Nakanoue left Wrestle-1, and this led to Jackets disbanding. Their last match together was against Real Desperado (Yuji Hino, Kazma Sakamoto & Nosawa Rongai), with Nakanoue pinning Nosawa after a Diving Elbow Drop for the win. In July, Yoshioka would team up with Andy Wu & Daiki Inaba to win the UWA World Trios titles back from Hayashi, Tanaka & Tajiri at Wrestle-1 Tour 2016 Symbol in Shinjuku Face. This time, Yoshioka's team managed a successful defence, defending against Kai, Hiroki Murase & Shota. Yoshioka would defeat teammate Andy Wu in a Cruiserweight Championship #1 contender's match, and on September 18, challenged Yusuke Kodama in a losing effort. Yoshioka, Wu & Inaba made a second successful defence, defending the UWA World Trios belts against Koji Doi, Yusuke Kodama & Kumagoro. After this match, all six men would form an alliance. Yoshioka, Inaba & Wu again successfully defended, this time against Trigger (Masayuki Kono & Shuji Kondo) & Nosawa Rongai. On December 9 at Wrestle-1 Tour 2016 Shining Winter, the unit of Yoshioka, Inaba, Yusuke Kodama, Koji Doi, Kumagoro & Andy Wu was named Newera. That same night, Yoshioka lost his UWA World Trios titles to Allied Forces (Shuji Kondo, Jun Kasai & Nosawa Rongai) after Kondo pinned Inaba following a King Kong Lariat.

On March 20, 2017, Yoshioka finally won the Wrestle-1 Cruiserweight Championship, beating Mazada in Korakuen Hall after his Clock Strikes Kicks. A month later, stablemate Andy Wu defeated him for the belt, ending his reign with 0 defences. Yoshioka then made regaining the championship his goal, eventually winning it back on September 2 at 2017 Pro-Wrestling Love in Yokohama after an SK kick. He made his first successful defence a month later against Jun Tonsho. Another month later, he made a second successful defence against Kenshin Chikano. Yoshioka's third successful defence came in December against Ryuiji Hijikata.

Newera's Yoshioka, Daiki Inaba & Jiro 'Ikemen' Kuroshio unsuccessfully challenged for the UWA World Trios Titles against Koji Doi, Takanori Ito & Kumagoro in January 2018. Yoshioka defended his Cruiser Division title against Alejandro on April 18, marking his fourth defense. The next day, Newera disbanded. On June 13, Yoshioka lost his championship to former ally Yusuke Kodama who had recently just joined Enfants Terribles. This brought his reign to 9 months with 4 defences. In September, Yoshioka failed to regain the Cruiser Division Championship from Kodoma. Yoshioka suffered an injury that month on a J-Stage show and missed 2 months of action. Before his return, it was revealed by the #Stronghearts stable led by Cima that they had a 'spy' on Wrestle-1's roster that would join them. This was revealed on the November 23 show Wrestle-1 Tour 2018 Autumn Bout in Korakuen Hall to be Yoshioka, who interfered in a tag team match with Alejandro's mask, provoking Kaz Hayashi & Pegaso Iluminal. He then wrestled in the main event 6-man tag match teaming with #Stronghearts's T-Hawk & El Lindaman to defeats Enfants Terribles (Shotaro Ashino, Kumagoro & Kenichiro Arai), with Yoshioka himself submitting Kumagoro with a Crossface Lock.

As part of #Stronghearts, Yoshioka had more freedom to perform for other promotions, returning to AJPW for their Junior Battle of Glory 2019 and making appearances for DDT. At W-1, though he'd progressed to the final of the Wrestle-1 2019 Cruiser Fes, beating Andy Wu and Jun Tondoroko to make it there. On March 10, he defeated El Hijo de Pantera with his new technique, the Crush Driver to win the 2019 Cruiser Fes, although the injuries sustained in the match meant he had to miss 3 months and couldn't capitalize on his momentum. He returned to the ring on June 9 teaming with #Stronghearts to take on Wrestle-1's Home Team. #Stronghearts lost the match. Yoshioka teamed with El Lindaman in the Wrestle-1 Tag League 2019, finishing the league with a record of 1-1-1. On December 26, Yoshioka won his third, and final Cruiser Division Championship from El Hijo de Pantera with the Crush Driver.

On February 21, 2020, Wrestle-1 announced it would be indefinitely suspended on April 1 and that all wrestlers would be immediately released from their contracts. On March 15 at Wrestle Wars 2020 in Ōta, Tokyo, he defended against Heat. On March 25, Newera made a reunion to farewell Wrestle-1 as Yoshioka, Daiki Inaba & Andy Wu fought the former Allied Powers, Kaz Hayashi, Shuji Kondo & Masayuki Kono to a 30-minute time limit draw in that show's main event. At Wrestle-1's last show to date, Yoshioka teamed with Cima & Issei Onitsuka of #Stronghearts in a losing effort against Andy Wu, Jun Tonsho & El Hijo del Pantera. Yoshioka was now a free agent, and also withdrew from #Stronghearts.

=== J-Stage appearances (2015-2020) ===
On December 1, Yoshioka would team with Yuya Susumu (formerly known as just Susumu) & Hayata at J-Stage's first event, both of whom he had trained with at Wrestle Gate. They would lose their match at J-Stage 1st in Shin-Kiba 1st Ring against Hi69, Mikami & Minoru Tanaka. On March 29, 2016, Yoshioka defeated Hayata. Scramble☆Time was reunited on August 5 as Yoshioka & Susumu lost to Masaaki Mochizuki & Minoru Tanaka. The next year, on 3 July 2017, Susumu defeated Yoshioka. On February 21, 2018, Yoshioka teamed with Jun Tonsho & Minoru Tanaka in a losing effort against Ratel's (Hayata & Yo-Hey) & Yuya Susumu. Yoshioka finally got a win over his senior, Susumu on the September 12 show for the first time in the 10 years they had been wrestling. Unfortunately, though he suffered a vertabre contusion, ruling him out for 2 months. Yoshioka's last appearance to date is an appearance on the March 18, 2020 show in Korakuen Hall where he and Susumu fought Big Japan Pro Wrestling's Astronauts (Fuminori Abe & Takuya Nomura) in a 20-minute time limit draw.

=== Pro Wrestling Noah (2018, 2020-present) ===
In June 2018, Yoshioka made an appearance in Pro Wrestling Noah teaming with Hayata, whom he had trained with at Wrestle Gate, to defeat Jiro 'Ikemen' Kuroshio & Yo-Hey.

On April 18, Yoshioka appeared at Pro Wrestling Noah, as the newest member of Takashi Sugiura's Sugiura-gun after being recruited by Nosawa Rongai. He then pinned Daisuke Harada in a six-man tag team match. He teamed up with Sugiura-gun member Hajime Ohara to challenge Ratel's (Hayata & Yo-Hey) for the GHC Junior Heavyweight Tag Team Championship the next day, but they were unsuccessful. On May 5, Sugiura-gun faced off against Kongo, in which Yoshioka faced Haoh in a losing effort, and Yoshioka, teaming with Sugiura-gun (Takashi Sugiura, Kazushi Sakuraba, René Duprée, Hajime Ohara & Nosawa Rongai) lost to Kongo (Kenoh, Masa Kitamiya, Manabu Soya, Yoshiki Inamura, Nioh & Haoh) in an Elimination Match. In that match, Yoshioka was eliminated first. On May 10, after Stinger (Atsushi Kotoge & Kotaro Suzuki) defeated Yoshioka & Ohara, Kotoge betrayed Suzuki, and wished to join Sugiura-gun. Nosawa Rongai then came out and disallowed it, saying he didn't trust him. This led to Yoshioka, Ohara & Kotoge turning on Nosawa, forming their own stable, which became known as Full Throttle. On August 30, at Kawasaki, Go! Yoshioka unsuccessfully challenged Kotaro Suzuki for the GHC Junior Heavyweight Championship. On September 23, Yo-Hey turned on Daisuke Harada, and Atsushi Kotoge defended his old friend, reuniting Momo no Seishun Tag.This caused Ohara & Yoshioka to kick Kotoge, their leader, out of Full Throttle, and welcome Yo-Hey as their newest member. On October 28, at Premium Prelude 2020, Yoshioka & Yo-Hey unsuccessfully challenged Momo no Seishun Tag for the GHC Junior Heavyweight Tag Team Championship. On November 6, Yoshioka signed a one-year contract with Noah.

On February 12, 2021, at Destination 2021 ~Back To Budokan~ in the Nippon Budokan, Yoshioka defeated GHC Junior Heavyweight Champion Daisuke Harada in just over 10 minutes to win the belt for the first time. After the match, he said that he was 'proud to be a part of Noah's Junior division'. He would go on to lose the belt to Atsushi Kotoge on March 14 at Great Voyage 2021 in Fukuoka, ending the run at just over a month and without a successful defence. On May 2, Yoshioka attacked tag partner Yo-Hey, betraying Full Throttle and joined Stinger with Yoshinari Ogawa & Wrestle Gate alumni Hayata & Yuya Susumu. Other Full Throttle member, Hajime Ohara, joined Daisuke Harada, Atsushi Kotoge & Junta Miyawaki's team. The two stables had an 8-man tag team match the next day, where Stinger won after Susumu pinned Miyawaki. Yo-Hey joined Nosawa Rongai's new unit, Los Perros del Mal de Japon, and Yoshioka met him at Muta the World on June 27, where Yoshioka teamed with Stinger mates Ogawa & Susumu to take on Los Perros del Mal de Japón's Yo-Hey, Nosawa & Dragon Gate's Eita. Yo-Hey pinned Yoshioka after 18 minutes with the Yo-Roll. On July 11, after Daisuke Harada & Hajime Harada defended their GHC Junior Heavyweight Tag Team Championships, Yoshioka & Susumu stepped up to challenge them. The match was scheduled for Cross Over 2021 in Hiroshima on August 1. On July 27, Noah held a 'Junior Team Game' in which Stinger was involved. In Stinger's match against Noah Regular Army, Yoshioka scored a submission elimination over former tag team partner Hajime Ohara. He made it to the last two, before being eliminated by Daisuke Harada, and thus Stinger was eliminated from the tournament. The reunion of Scramble☆Time (Yoshioka & Susumu) defeated Harada & Ohara at Cross Over 2021 in Hiroshima to each win the GHC Junior Heavyweight Tag Team Championship for the first time each.

== Championships and accomplishments ==
- All Japan Pro Wrestling
  - World Junior Heavyweight Championship (1 time)
  - All Asia Tag Team Championship (3 times, current) – with Musashi
- All Star Wrestling
  - British Light Heavyweight Championship (1 time)
- Dragon Gate
  - Open the Triangle Gate Championship (1 time) – with Yoshinari Ogawa and Yuya Susumu
- Pro Wrestling Illustrated
  - Ranked No. 368 of the top 500 singles wrestlers in the PWI 500 in 2018
- Pro Wrestling Kageki
  - Hakata Tag Team Championship (1 time) - with Susumu
- Pro Wrestling Noah
  - GHC Junior Heavyweight Championship (1 time)
  - GHC Junior Heavyweight Tag Team Championship (4 times) - with Yuya Susumu (2) and Atsushi Kotoge (2)
- Pro Wrestling Zero1
  - NWA World Junior Heavyweight Championship (1 time)
  - International Junior Heavyweight Championship (1 time)
  - NWA International Lightweight Tag Team Championship (1 time) - with Shuji Kondo
- Wrestle-1
  - UWA World Trios Championship (3 times) - with Jiro Kuroshio and Yasufumi Nakanoue (2), and Andy Wu and Daiki Inaba (1)
  - Wrestle-1 Cruiser Division Championship (3 times, final)
  - Wrestle-1 Cruiser Festival (2019)

== See also ==
- List of Wrestle-1 personnel
