= Wrestle-1 =

Japanese professional wrestling promotion

- Acronym: W-1
- Founded: July 10, 2013
- Defunct: April 1, 2020
- Style: "Fighting Entertainment"
- Headquarters: Hyakunincho, Shinjuku, Tokyo
- Founder: Keiji Mutoh
- Owner: Keiji Mutoh
- Parent: K.K. GEN Sports Entertainment
- Split from: All Japan Pro Wrestling
- Website: W-1.co.jp

Wrestle-1 (レッスル・ワン, Ressuru Wan) was a Japanese puroresu or professional wrestling promotion, founded in July 2013 by Keiji Mutoh following his resignation from All Japan Pro Wrestling (AJPW). The core of the promotion's roster was formed by wrestlers loyal to Mutoh, who left AJPW in a mass exodus during June 2013. Mutoh served as the promotion's first president and the head of its parent company, kabushiki gaisha named GEN Sports Entertainment. In March 2017, Kaz Hayashi took over as the new president of Wrestle-1. The promotion held its first event on September 8, 2013, at Tokyo Dome City Hall.

The promotion shares its name with a series of professional wrestling events run by AJPW, K-1 and Pride Fighting Championships in the first half of the 2000s, but it is not considered a direct continuation of that project.

On April 1, 2020, Wrestle-1 ceased operations.

== History ==
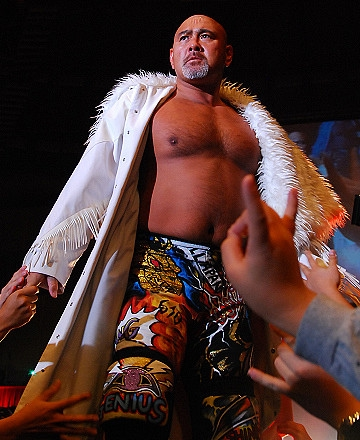
Keiji Mutoh, the founder and first president of Wrestle-1

=== 2013 ===
==== Formation ====
On November 1, 2012, IT company Speed Partners bought 100% of All Japan Pro Wrestling (AJPW) shares from main shareholder Keiji Mutoh and his business partners for ¥200 million. In late May 2013, Speed Partners president Nobuo Shiraishi fired AJPW president, Mutoh's longtime right-hand man Masayuki Uchida, and took over as the promotion's new president himself effective June 1, which led to Mutoh resigning as the chairman of the board and leaving the promotion. For the next weeks, Mutoh attempted to buy back his shares of the promotion from Speed Partners, but eventually gave up the attempt before the end of the month. During the rest of June, Masakatsu Funaki, Kaz Hayashi, Shuji Kondo, Ryota Hama, Hiroshi Yamato, Masayuki Kono, Koji Kanemoto, Minoru Tanaka, Yasufumi Nakanoue, Kai, Seiya Sanada, and Andy Wu all announced their resignation from AJPW out of loyalty to Mutoh and left the promotion following a June 30 event in Ryōgoku Kokugikan, which marked the official end of the eleven-year-long "Mutoh All Japan".

On July 10, Mutoh held a press conference to announce the foundation of his new promotion, named "Wrestle-1". Mutoh got the name from a series of professional wrestling events that were produced by his AJPW, K-1 and Pride Fighting Championships between 2002 and 2005. Wrestle-1 continues Mutoh's brand of "Pro Wrestling Love", which he had launched after taking over AJPW in 2002. Mutoh dubbed Wrestle-1's style of puroresu "Fighting Entertainment". As the label suggests, Wrestle-1 is considered more entertainment based than the traditional AJPW. The press conference was also attended by Funaki, Hama, Hayashi, Kai, Kondo, Kono, Nakanoue, Tanaka and Yamato. Andy Wu would also join the promotion, once he returned from an excursion to Mexico, along with trainees Brian Ishizaka, Daiki Inaba and Seiki Yoshioka, ring announcer Makoto Abe and referees Daichi Murayama and Daisuke Kanbayashi. The promotion announced its inaugural event for September 8, 2013, at Tokyo Dome City Hall. At the press conference, Mutoh stated that Wrestle-1 was open to working with other promotions and that he was looking to use Taiwan as a stepping stone towards an Asian and eventually global expansion. Mutoh also stated that he was open to the idea of having a women's division in Wrestle-1. On July 26, the Gaora television station announced that it would broadcast the inaugural event, as well as a 30-minute preview show, live on its channels. On July 30, Mutoh met with Jeff Jarrett in Nashville, Tennessee, United States to discuss a possible working relationship between Wrestle-1 and Total Nonstop Action Wrestling (TNA). Jarrett was later announced as a participant in Wrestle-1's October 6 event. Mutoh later also revealed that he wanted to form partnerships with promotions in Europe and Mexico, specifically mentioning Lucha Libre AAA World Wide (AAA), and create a "true" world championship that would be recognized on three continents. On August 9, Mutoh revealed the promotion's official logo and a partial card for the inaugural event. Also announced was a sponsorship deal with the Ezaki Glico confectionery company, with its sales department and product manager Hiroki Kuwabara signed to Wrestle-1 as a conditioning coach.

==== Wrestle-1 Hataage Sen ====
Wrestle-1 Hataage Sen (WRESTLE-1旗揚げ戦, Wrestle-1 Hataage Sen; literally translated "Wrestle-1 Raising an Army Competition") was Wrestle-1's inaugural event, which took place on September 8, 2013, at Tokyo Dome City Hall. On August 9, Wrestle-1 released the first partial card for the event, which revealed only the Wrestle-1 signed workers taking part in the event, but none of their partners or opponents. The event featured a women's match and the Japanese in-ring debut of Daiki Inaba. None of the other workers were revealed before the event, though Mutoh stated that TNA wrestlers would not be taking part in the event. The event aired in Japan on Gaora and internationally on internet pay-per-view (iPPV) through Niconico and Ustream. Tickets to the 2,500-seat arena were sold out the day they went on sale. Sports journalist Dave Meltzer wrote that this, coupled with AJPW's recent decline in attendance numbers, showed that "fans are taking Muto's [sic] group as the real future of All Japan rather than All Japan". The event featured outside participation from several freelancers as well as wrestlers from Big Japan Pro Wrestling, Dragon Gate, Michinoku Pro Wrestling, Pro Wrestling Zero1 and World Wonder Ring Stardom. Koji Kanemoto, René Duprée, Seiya Sanada and Zodiac, who were with AJPW prior to Mutoh's departure, but had not announced their affiliation with Wrestle-1, made surprise appearances during the event. In fact, Duprée, who took part in the main event, was still officially AJPW's reigning Gaora TV Champion at the time of the event. Duprée returned the title belt to AJPW three days after the event. Bob Sapp, who had appeared in several of the old Wrestle-1 events, made an appearance in a tag team main event with Mutoh. Kenta Kobashi, who had the previous March announced that he would be joining AJPW following his retirement in May, worked the event as a color commentator.

No.	Results	Stipulations	Times
1	Daiki Inaba and Hiroshi Yamato defeated Tokyo Gurentai (Mazada and Nosawa Rongai)	Tag team match	06:38
2	Kohei Sato and Ryoji Sai defeated Ryota Hama and Yasufumi Nakanoue	Tag team match	10:18
3	Yoshiko defeated Mayu Iwatani	Singles match	06:27
4	Junior Stars (Koji Kanemoto and Minoru Tanaka) defeated Fujita Hayato and Masaaki Mochizuki	Tag team match	13:01
5	Daisuke Sekimoto and Yuji Okabayashi defeated Team 246 (Kaz Hayashi and Shuji Kondo)	Tag team match	15:06
6	Laughter7 (Katsuyori Shibata and Kazushi Sakuraba) defeated Stack of Arms (Masakatsu Funaki and Masayuki Kono)	Tag team match	18:06
7	Kai defeated Seiya Sanada	Singles match	16:45
8	Bob Sapp and Keiji Mutoh defeated René Duprée and Zodiac	Tag team match	10:20

==== Launch of regular tours ====
Wrestle-1 began running regular tours right after Hataage Sen; the first tour ran until September 22 and the second from October 6 to 14. Many of the outsiders taking part in the inaugural event became regular members of the Wrestle-1 roster with the exception of Bob Sapp, Fujita Hayato, Katsuyori Shibata, Kazushi Sakuraba and Masaaki Mochizuki. Though Wrestle-1 also did not have regular female wrestlers on its roster, each event included a women's match, featuring wrestlers such as Ryo Mizunami and Shuu Shibutani from Pro Wrestling Wave, Koharu Hinata, Makoto and Syuri from Wrestling New Classic, Hikaru Shida, Maki Narumiya, Risa Sera and Tsukasa Fujimoto from Ice Ribbon, and freelancers Akino and Hiroyo Matsumoto. Wrestle-1 sought to introduce an "openweight division", where its wrestlers would not be typecast as heavyweights or junior heavyweights, like in most Japanese promotions, but would be able to interact with each other across weight limits. On September 24, Wrestle-1 announced that Seiya Sanada had signed a contract to officially become part of the promotion's roster effective October 1. On October 6, Wrestle-1 held its first event in Korakuen Hall in front of a sold-out crowd of 1,750. On October 18, Mutoh announced his semi-retirement from in-ring action, saying that in the future he would be concentrating on running Wrestle-1.

The following month saw the continuation of a working relationship between Wrestle-1 and TNA, with A.J. Styles coming in to defend the TNA World Heavyweight Championship against Seiya Sanada on November 16 and Jay Bradley and Rob Terry working the entire tour from November 16 to December 1. Meanwhile, Andy Wu also made his return from his seven-month Mexican excursion, making his debut for his new home promotion on November 16. During the event, Wrestle-1 announced its first ever event at Ryōgoku Kokugikan, set to take place on March 2, 2014. Mutoh later announced that this would mark only the first of four events Wrestle-1 intended to run at Ryōgoku Kokugikan in 2014.

=== 2014 ===
On January 12, 2014, Manabu Soya, who had resigned from AJPW the previous month, joined Wrestle-1 as a freelancer, taking the role of an on-screen matchmaker, while recovering from a recent shoulder surgery. On January 26, Wrestle-1 held its first tryout, which resulted in three men being accepted to begin training at the promotion's dojo the following April.

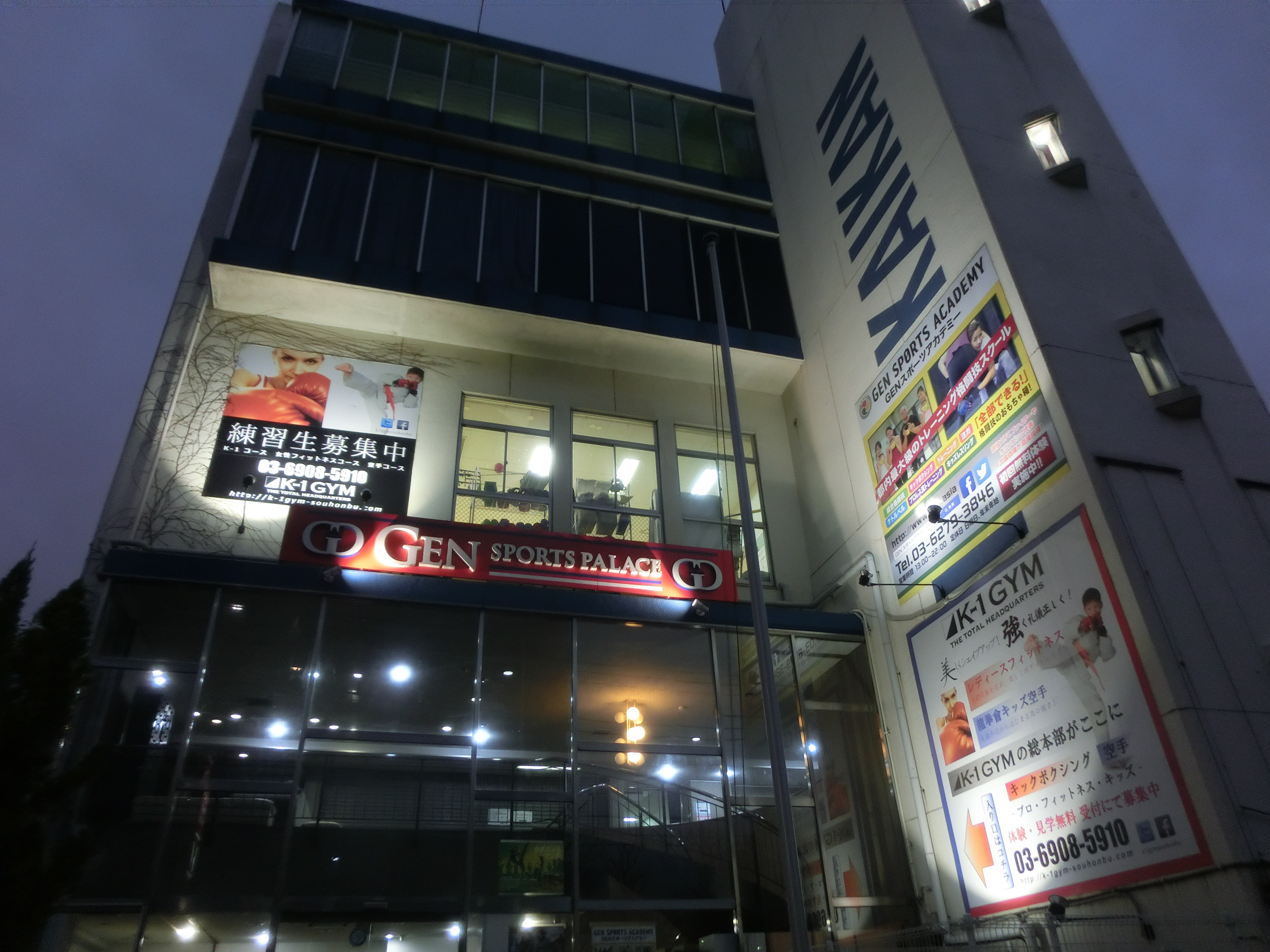
GEN Sports Palace, the location of Wrestle-1's office and dojo

On January 30 it was announced that the March 2 Ryōgoku Kokugikan event would feature a "Wrestle-1 vs. TNA" theme with thirteen wrestlers coming in to represent the American promotion in addition to Rob Terry, who had remained with Wrestle-1 since the past November. Jeff Jarrett, the original man behind the Wrestle-1-TNA relationship, had since parted ways with TNA and now the relationship was handled by Bob Ryder and John Gaburick on the Americans' side. On March 2 at Kaisen: Outbreak, three TNA titles were defended as part of Wrestle-1's first Ryōgoku Kokugikan event. While Kaz Hayashi and Shuji Kondo failed to capture the TNA World Tag Team Championship and Kai the TNA World Heavyweight Championship, Seiya Sanada defeated Austin Aries to become the new TNA X Division Champion. The event also saw the debut of another former AJPW worker, Taiyō Kea. The following day, it was announced that Sanada would be leaving Wrestle-1 to work for TNA indefinitely. Also in March, Wrestle-1 relocated their offices from Minami-Azabu, Minato, Tokyo to Hyakunincho, Shinjuku, Tokyo to their own four-story building called "GEN Sports Palace", which also includes the promotion's dojo. In April, Wrestle-1 established two more international relationships with British promotion All Star Wrestling (ASW) and German promotion European Wrestling Promotion (EWP). As part of the relationship, EWP wrestlers Ecki Eckstein and Leon Van Gasteren worked a tour with Wrestle-1 from April 27 to May 4, with Van Gasteren successfully defending the EWP Intercontinental Championship against Hiroshi Yamato on the final day.

On June 18, Wrestle-1 held a press conference to announce that effective July 1 the promotion would be joined by Akira, Jiro Kuroshio, Koji Doi, Rionne Fujiwara, Tajiri and Yusuke Kodama, after their previous promotion Wrestling New Classic went inactive following June 26. On July 1, Wrestle-1 was also joined by Hiroki Murase, a freelancer who had started his career with WNC in January 2013. Wrestle-1's second Ryōgoku Kokugikan event, Shōgeki: Impact, took place on July 6 and featured matches for ASW's British Light Heavyweight Championship, EWP's Intercontinental Championship, TNA's World Tag Team Championship and Zero1's World Heavyweight Championship with Hiroshi Yamato capturing the EWP title from Leon Van Gasteren, Masakatsu Funaki the Zero1 title from Kohei Sato and Seiki Yoshioka the ASW title from Dean Allmark. The following day, Seiya Sanada announced he had agreed to a contract with TNA, which meant that he would continue to spend most of his time in the United States, occasionally returning to take part in Wrestle-1's larger events. Sanada remained with TNA until April 2015. Meanwhile, Seiki Yoshioka left for an extended tour of the United Kingdom with ASW, during which he lost the British Light Heavyweight Championship back to Allmark.

On July 21, Wrestle-1 announced the creation of its first own title, the Wrestle-1 Championship, with the inaugural champion being determined in a sixteen-man single-elimination tournament taking place between September 21 and October 8. On August 8, Wrestle-1 announced that Manabu Soya had signed with the promotion, ending his days as a freelancer. On September 22, Wrestle-1 announced the creation of the Wrestle-1 Tag Team Championship with the inaugural champions being determined in a round-robin tournament taking place between November 15 and 30. On September 25, Wrestle-1 and Pro Wrestling Zero1 announced that the two promotions would be coming together to hold three joint shows at Shinjuku Face between November 5 and 7. On October 8, Masayuki Kono defeated Kai in the finals of the sixteen-man tournament to become the inaugural Wrestle-1 Champion. The relationship between Wrestle-1 and TNA continued on October 12 with eleven Wrestle-1 wrestlers taking part in TNA's Bound for Glory event in Korakuen Hall. On November 1, Wrestle-1 held an event at Ryōgoku Kokugikan celebrating Keiji Mutoh's 30th anniversary in professional wrestling. The main event of the show saw Mutoh defeat Masayuki Kono to become the second Wrestle-1 Champion. On November 30, Team 246 (Kaz Hayashi and Shuji Kondo) won the First Tag League Greatest to become the inaugural Wrestle-1 Tag Team Champions.

=== 2015 ===
On February 25, 2015, Wrestle-1 announced the creation of a cruiserweight division and a new third title, which was on March 9 officially named the Wrestle-1 Cruiser Division Championship. Starting on April 11, Wrestle-1 began holding shows at their dojo under the brand name "Wrestle-1 Starting Point", which were intended to showcase the promotion's younger wrestlers. On March 6, Minoru Tanaka won the tournament to become the inaugural Wrestle-1 Cruiser Division Champion. Also in May, it was reported that the relationship between Wrestle-1 and TNA had come to an end. Seiya Sanada remained in the United States, working on the local independent circuit.

In March 2015, Wrestle-1's management was hit with several resignations, which led to Mutoh offering DDT Pro-Wrestling president Sanshiro Takagi a job in his promotion's management. On May 5, Takagi was officially revealed as Wrestle-1's new chief executive officer (CEO). His goal was to make Wrestle-1 more profitable by getting sales up and increasing the number of shows. There were no plans for Takagi to start wrestling for Wrestle-1 or for Wrestle-1 and DDT to exchange talent. On May 13, Wrestle-1 and Seiya Sanada held a press conference, where it was announced that the two sides had decided to amicably part ways when Sanada's contract with the promotion would expire two days later, so he could continue working in the United States full-time as a freelancer. Later that month, it was announced that Wrestle-1 would be teaming up with American Pro Wrestling Alliance (APWA) to hold their first tour of the United States, holding five shows in Pennsylvania, West Virginia, North Carolina and Georgia, including one at the former ECW Arena, between June 23 and 28. However, on June 19, the tour was canceled with APWA citing a sponsor pulling out due to miscommunication between the two promotions as the reason. That same day, Wrestle-1 announced that Masakatsu Funaki would be leaving the promotion following his contract expiring on June 30. Meanwhile, Tajiri would only work sporadic Wrestle-1 events from July onwards. On June 26, Wrestle-1 announced the results of their recent contract negotiations with their wrestlers. 21 wrestlers had signed new contracts, including freelancer Kazma Sakamoto who in the process made Wrestle-1 his new home promotion, while Rionne Fujiwara became the second wrestler to leave the promotion following his contract expiring at the end of the month.

On July 13, Wrestle-1 announced the first "Wrestle-1 Grand Prix", a single-elimination tournament featuring 21 participants and taking place between August 2 and 30. The tournament was billed as the Wrestle-1 equivalent of New Japan Pro-Wrestling's G1 Climax. On August 3, Wrestle-1 announced the establishment of Puroresu Sōgō Gakuin ("Pro wrestling comprehensive school"), where Akira, Hiroshi Yamato, Kaz Hayashi, Shuji Kondo and Yasufumi Nakanoue would train both men and women in six-month-long terms. Graduates from the school are not automatically signed to Wrestle-1 and are free to join other promotions. The school's first term started two months later. On August 30, Wrestle-1 announced it was reviving two inactive titles on October 9; the UWA World Trios Championship and the F-1 Tag Team Championship, the latter being a comedy title Mutoh created in AJPW in 2006 for teams made up of a wrestler and an impressionist. On October 27, Wrestle-1 announced a new project named "Wrestling Camp", headed by Kaz Hayashi and former wrestler American Balloon, with the goal of recruiting more foreign wrestlers for the promotion.

=== 2016 ===
On March 30, 2016, Wrestle-1 held a show to celebrate the conclusion of the first term of the Puroresu Sōgō Gakuin, while also announcing the graduation of Hana Kimura, Jun Tonsho, Reika Saiki and Seigo Tachibana. With two women graduating from the class, Keiji Mutoh teased the possibility of starting a women's division in Wrestle-1. On May 4, AJPW president Jun Akiyama made a surprise appearance for Wrestle-1, facing off with Keiji Mutoh with the two agreeing to a tag team match against each other on August 11. On June 28, Wrestle-1 announced that Akira, Minoru Tanaka, Ryota Hama, Tajiri and Yasufumi Nakanoue would all be leaving the promotion following the expiration of their contracts two days later. On August 11, Wrestle-1 presented an interpromotional six-man tag team match, which saw AJPW president Jun Akiyama take on former AJPW president Keiji Mutoh. In the match, the AJPW trio of Akiyama, Naoya Nomura and Yuma Aoyagi was victorious over the Wrestle-1 trio of Mutoh, Koji Doi and Kumagoro. On August 31, Kazma Sakamoto also left Wrestle-1 following the expiration of his contract. On September 18, Wrestle-1 announced a new sub-promotion Pro-Wrestling A.C.E. (Academy, Challenge, Entertainment), which was made up of rookies from their wrestling school. On December 20, Kai announced he would be leaving Wrestle-1 and becoming a freelancer at the end of the year.

=== 2017 ===
On January 8, 2017, Wrestle-1 announced the creation of a new title, the Wrestle-1 Result Championship, meant for the promotion's younger wrestlers. On March 27, Wrestle-1 announced it was undergoing a change in management on April 1 with Keiji Mutoh moving on to the role of representative director, while Kaz Hayashi would become the new president. Also, Shuji Kondo takes over as the new executive vice president, while Sanshiro Takagi moves from being the CEO to the role of an advisor. On June 14, Wrestle-1 announced the creation of the Wrestle-1 Tag League in the fall and Wrestle-1 Cruiser Festival in the winter. On September 2, Sanshiro Takagi resigned from his advisory role in Wrestle-1. It was stated that the company would continue to have a friendly relationship with Takagi's DDT promotion.

=== 2018–2019 ===
On January 17, 2018, Wrestle-1 established a working relationship with Booker T's Reality of Wrestling (ROW) promotion.

In 2019, Wrestle-1 established the "Wrestle-1 Alliance", a promotional partnership with multiple U.S.-based wrestling companies.

=== 2020 ===
On February 29, 2020, Wrestle-1 announced that they would be holding their final event on April 1, with all members of the roster being released from their contracts the day prior. In the last card, on April 1 (with no attendance due to the COVID-19 pandemic), Manabu Soya won a 30-man battle royal, last eliminating Akira. Keiji Muto participated in the match prior to the main event, teaming with Hayashi, Kono and Kondo in a losing effort against Ashino, Inaba, Doi and Kuma Arashi, but did not participate in the battle royal.

== Roster ==
=== Natives ===
- Alejandro/Kohei Fujimura
- Andy Wu
- Cima
- Daiki Inaba
- El Lindaman
- Kannazuki
- Kaz Hayashi
- Keiji Mutoh
- Manabu Soya
- Masakatsu Funaki
- Masato Tanaka
- Masayuki Kono
- Mazada
- Minoru Tanaka
- Nosawa Rongai
- Jiro Kuroshio
- Kai
- Ryota Hama
- Ryuki Honda
- Seigo Tachibana
- Seiki Yoshioka
- Seiya Sanada
- Shotaro Ashino
- Shuji Kondo
- Soma Watanabe
- T-Hawk
- Tajiri
- Takanori Ito
- Takumi Baba
- Takuro Niki
- Yusuke Kodama
- Hiroki Murase/Utamaro
- Koji Doi
- Kumagoro/Kuma Arashi

=== Foreigners ===
- Bob Sapp
- El Hijo del Pantera
- Jay Bradley
- René Duprée
- Rob Terry
- Taiyo Kea
- Zodiac

== Championships ==
Championship	Final champion(s)	Reign	Date won	Days held	Notes
Wrestle-1 Championship	Kaz Hayashi	1	March 15, 2020	17	Defeated Katsuhiko Nakajima at Wrestle Wars 2020.
Wrestle-1 Cruiser Division Championship	Seiki Yoshioka	3	December 26, 2019	97	Defeated El Hijo del Pantera at Wrestle-1 Tour 2019 Shining Winter.
Wrestle-1 Result Championship	Vacant	—	June 5, 2019	—	Vacant after Kuma Arashi returns the belt due to dissatisfaction.
Wrestle-1 Tag Team Championship	Daiki Inaba and Koji Doi	1 (1 / 5)	March 15, 2020	17	Defeated Shotaro Ashino and Yusuke Kodama at Wrestle Wars 2020.

=== Other championships used by Wrestle-1 ===
Championship	Final champion(s) recognized by Wrestle-1	Reign	Date won	Days held	Notes
UWA World Trios Championship	Vacant	—	March 9, 2019	—	Vacant after champions Tokyo Gurentai (Fujita, Mazada and Nosawa Rongai) left the company. The championship originated in the Universal Wrestling Association.
F-1 Tag Team Championship	Kannazuki and Keiji Mutoh	2 (3 / 2)	October 9, 2015	1,636	Defeated Manabu Soya and Sugi-chan at Fan Kansha Dē. The championship originated in All Japan Pro Wrestling.

== Tournaments ==
Tournament	Latest winner(s)	Date won
Wrestle-1 Grand Prix	Daiki Inaba	July 2, 2019
Wrestle-1 Tag League	Shigehiro Irie and T-Hawk	November 27, 2019
Wrestle-1 Cruiser Festival	Heat	February 12, 2020
Road to Keiji Mutoh Tournament	Jiro Kuroshio	May 30, 2015

== See also ==
- All Japan Pro Wrestling
- Pro Wrestling Zero1
- Wrestling New Classic
