= Tokyo Gurentai =

Professional wrestling stable

Stable
- Members: Fujita; Kikuzawa; Mazada; Nosawa Rongai
- Name(s): La Legion Japonesa; Tokyo Gurentai
- Billed from: Tokyo, Japan
- Former members: Magnitude Tokyo; Mikami; Sugawara; Takemura
- Debut: July 2000
- Years active: 2000–present

Tokyo Gurentai (東京愚連隊, Tōkyō Gurentai) is a professional wrestling stable, currently made up of Fujita, Kikuzawa, Mazada, and Nosawa Rongai. The group was formed in 2000 by Kikuzawa, Mazada and Nosawa and has since appeared for Japan's four biggest promotions; All Japan Pro Wrestling, Dragon Gate, New Japan Pro-Wrestling and Pro Wrestling Noah, as well as several larger independent promotions such DDT Pro-Wrestling, Diamond Ring, Kaientai Dojo, Osaka Pro Wrestling and Wrestling New Classic (WNC), while also regularly producing their own independent events. The stable has also made appearances for promotions in Mexico and the United States. Currently the stable is working most notably for Wrestle-1. "Gurentai", denoting "hoodlums", is one of the three principal member categories of the yakuza crime syndicate.

== History ==
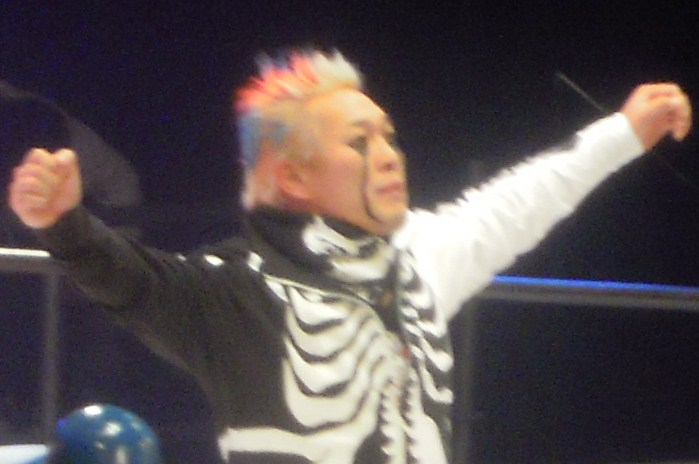
Nosawa Rongai

In July 2000, while working for the American Xtreme Pro Wrestling (XPW) promotion in Los Angeles, California, Japanese wrestlers Kikuzawa and Nosawa began teaming together as "Tokyo Gurentai". Later that same month, Nosawa used the same team name while teaming with compatriot Mazada on the Mexican independent circuit, culminating in the two defeating Los Rayos Tapatío (Rayo Tapatío I and Rayo Tapatío II) for the UWA World Tag Team Championship. Upon their return to Japan, Kikuzawa, Mazada and Nosawa teamed together for local independent promotions until January 2001, when Kikuzawa left the group as he began concentrating on his work with Osaka Pro Wrestling as the masked comedy character Ebessan. The following March, Mazada and Nosawa returned to Mexico to work for the International Wrestling Revolution Group (IWRG), where Fujita joined them as the third member of Tokyo Gurentai. The three also teamed together for promotions in the United States the following month. Mazada and Nosawa returned to IWRG during the summer of 2001, first losing their hairs to Mike Segura and Último Vampiro in a Hair vs. Hair match on May 31, and then defeating Los Megas (Mega and Super Mega) on June 10 for the IWRG Intercontinental Tag Team Championship. They held the title for a month, before being stripped when Nosawa no-showed a scheduled title defense. As the relationship between Mazada and Nosawa went sour, the Tokyo Gurentai was effectively dissolved.

Mazada and Nosawa finally made amends in April 2002 and the following month began working together for Mexican promotion Consejo Mundial de Lucha Libre (CMLL), forming a new version of the Tokyo Gurentai with Takemura. The group also returned to IWRG and in June 2003 won the promotion's Intercontinental Trios Championship from Los Megas (Mega, Omega and Ultra Mega). They, however, held the title for only a week before losing it back to Los Megas. That same month, the Tokyo Gurentai produced their own independent event in Tulancingo, Hidalgo. Takemura left the Tokyo Gurentai in October 2003, after signing with New Japan Pro-Wrestling (NJPW), while Mazada and Nosawa began working regularly with All Japan Pro Wrestling (AJPW) in February 2004. In May 2004, Mazada and Nosawa also made guest appearances for NJPW, feuding with former stablemate Takemura. The following month, Takemura quit NJPW and jumped to AJPW, re-joining the Tokyo Gurentai. Mazada and Nosawa, the latter now known as Nosawa Rongai (Nosawa論外) (which made him the first Tokyo Gurentai member to use Japanese script as part of his ring name), received their first title opportunity in AJPW in October 2004, when they unsuccessfully challenged Genichiro Tenryu and Masanobu Fuchi for the All Asia Tag Team Championship. In February 2005, Mazada and Nosawa had another storyline falling out, after which Nozawa formed the new tag team RonKaz with Kaz Hayashi, throwing the future of the Tokyo Gurentai into question. While the Tokyo Gurentai was inactive in Japan, the stable's three original members, Kikuzawa, Mazada and Nosawa, made a one-night reunion in April 2005, working for the Los Angeles-based Alternative Wrestling Show (AWS) promotion.

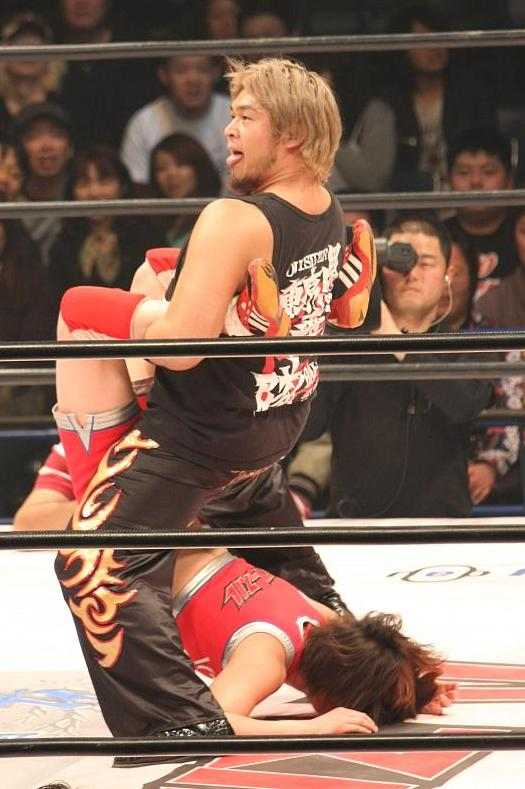
Takemura

Mazada and Nosawa tried a reunion also in Japan in June 2005 by entering a tournament for the vacant All Asia Tag Team Championship, however, after being eliminated in their first round match, the two began feuding with each other, leading to a Loser Leaves Town match in July, where Mazada defeated Nosawa, forcing him to leave AJPW. Before the end of the year, Mazada and Nosawa made several more attempts to once again get along with each other, which eventually led to them re-forming the Tokyo Gurentai with Takemura in December. The following month, Mazada and Nosawa returned to AJPW, where, two months later, they won the first annual Junior Tag League. In June 2006, Mazada and Nosawa also returned to Mexico, working for Toryumon Mexico. In January 2008, the Tokyo Gurentai was turned into an official corporation, which began producing its own events on a more regular basis, with Mazada, Nosawa and Takemura becoming its official representatives. In March 2008, Mazada and Nosawa revived the UWA World Tag Team Championship, which had not been seen in eight years, losing it to the team of Kagetora and Kota Ibushi at an event held by El Dorado Wrestling. In December, Mazada, Nosawa and Takemura won the Mobius promotion's Apex of Triangle Six-Man Tag Team Championship. In January 2009, Takemura suffered a shoulder injury, which would eventually force him to retire from professional wrestling. In February 2009, Fujita reunited with Mazada and Nosawa, effectively replacing Takemura as the third member of Tokyo Gurentai. He would become officially affiliated with the group in January 2010. From 2008 to 2010, Tokyo Gurentai was a sub-group of an AJPW stable named simply Gurentai, which also included Minoru Suzuki, Taiyō Kea and Yoshihiro Takayama. During the first six months of 2010, Fujita, Mazada and Nosawa worked for DDT Pro-Wrestling and Osaka Pro Wrestling and between the two promotions won the UWA World Trios Championship on two occasions. Shortly afterwards, Tokyo Gurentai was split up, when Fujita and Nosawa joined Pro Wrestling Noah, where they chased the GHC Junior Heavyweight Tag Team Championship, while Mazada remained a regular with AJPW. During 2011, Tokyo Gurentai was hit hard, when first in February, Nosawa was arrested for stealing a taxi, which led to him taking a break from professional wrestling, and then in May, Mazada also went inactive, after being suspended by AJPW for his role in a backstage fight between Nobukazu Hirai and Yoshikazu Taru, which left Hirai in a coma. Tokyo Gurentai reunited on September 28, 2011, when the stable produced its own event titled Tokyo Love II: Second Chance. Following the main event, where Nosawa lost his Tokyo World Heavyweight Championship to Sanshiro Takagi, he was confronted by Mazada, who suggested the two reformed their old tag team. The event concluded with Mazada, Nosawa, Fujita and Kikuzawa posing together and showing that the Tokyo Gurentai was back in full force. Most of 2012, Mazada and Nosawa, however, spent away from each other, with Mazada continuing to work regularly for AJPW and Nosawa for Diamond Ring. Nosawa's career was also halted for three months by a drug smuggling arrest, though all charges against him were later dropped. In September 2012, Nosawa returned to AJPW, where he and Mazada once again attempted to win the All Asia Tag Team Championship, but were defeated by Koji Kanemoto and Minoru Tanaka in the semifinals of a tournament for the vacant title.

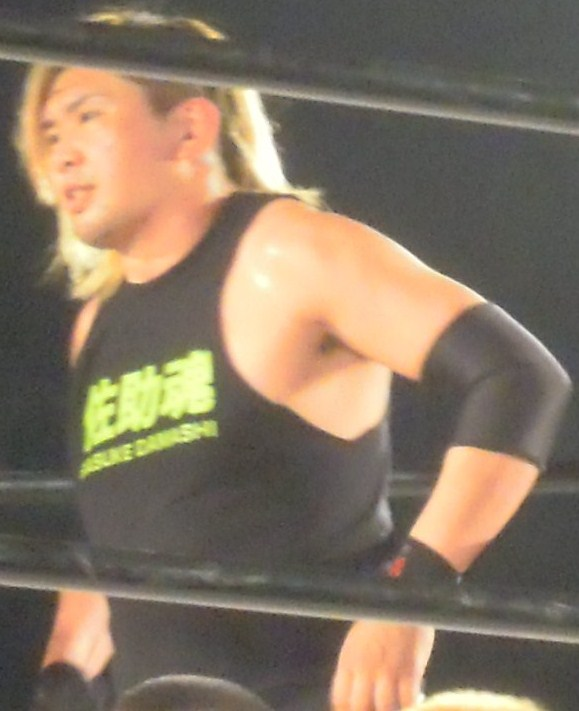
Fujita

On January 16, 2013, Tokyo Gurentai produced Tokyo Love III, which saw Mazada and Nosawa defeat Cima and Gamma to become the inaugural Tokyo World Tag Team Champions. Meanwhile, in the main event, Fujita defeated Takagi to become the third Tokyo World Heavyweight Champion. During the summer of 2013, Tokyo Gurentai made appearances for Wrestling New Classic (WNC), where most notably Mazada got involved in a feud with Mexican wrestler El Hijo del Pantera, which led to a Mask vs. Hair match on October 31, where Pantera was victorious, forcing Mazada to have his head shaved. Members of Tokyo Gurentai remained regulars for AJPW until mid-2013, when Keiji Mutoh left the promotion to form Wrestle-1. From September onwards, Mazada and Nosawa wrestled regularly for Wrestle-1, where they formed alliances with Hub and Yoshihiro Takayama and feuded with the promotion's rookies as well as Hiroshi Yamato. In October, Tokyo Gurentai entered a storyline, where Yamato, despite being turned down by Nosawa, attempted to force himself into Tokyo Gurentai. Mazada and Nosawa were forced into teaming with Yamato, but refused to accept him as an official member of their stable. On December 4, Tokyo Gurentai produced Tokyo Dream 2013 in Korakuen Hall. In the main event, Mazada and Nosawa lost the Tokyo World Tag Team Championship to Mexican veteran wrestlers Dos Caras and Mil Máscaras. After Caras and Máscaras left Japan with the Tokyo World Tag Team Championship, the Tokyo Gurentai created a new title, the Tokyo Intercontinental Tag Team Championship, to take the old title's place. Mazada and Hub became the first champions, after defeating Hikaru Sato and Masaaki Mochizuki at Tokyo Love IV: Classic Events on April 7, 2014. They lost the title to Sato and Mochizuki on July 7 at Tokyo Starrcade in a three-way elimination match, which also included Nosawa and Dr. Wagner Jr. On December 11, Tokyo Gurentai presented Tokyo Dream 2014, during which Mazada defeated Fujita to become the fourth Tokyo World Heavyweight Champion, ending Fujita's near two-year reign at his sixth title defense.

In November 2014, Mazada and Nosawa represented Tokyo Gurentai in Wrestle-1's First Tag League Greatest, a tournament which was used to determine the inaugural Wrestle-1 Tag Team Champions. Losing all four of their matches in the tournament, they finished last in their round-robin block. They finally earned their first shot at the title by defeating Ikemen Samurai (Jiro Kuroshio and Masakatsu Funaki) and new Wild order (Akira and Manabu Soya) in a three-way match on May 5, 2015. The title match took place on May 23 and saw Tokyo Gurentai being defeated by the defending champions, Team 246 (Kaz Hayashi and Shuji Kondo). On July 15, Tokyo Gurentai held Tokyo Love 5, which featured Mazada successfully defending the Tokyo World Heavyweight Championship against Nosawa in the main event. On December 1 at Tokyo Dream 2015, Mazada lost the title to Masaaki Mochizuki. On September 27, 2017, Fujita and Mazada defeated Dick Togo and Shiryu to win the Tokyo Intercontinental Tag Team Championship.

== Championships promoted ==
=== Active ===
Championship	Current champion(s)	Date won	Won from
Tokyo World Heavyweight Championship	Fujita	September 25, 2019	Akira
Tokyo Intercontinental Tag Team Championship	Dick Togo and Mazada	September 25, 2019	Masaaki Mochizuki and Rocky Kawamura

=== Inactive ===
Championship	Last champion(s)	Date won	Won from
Tokyo World Tag Team Championship	Dos Caras and Mil Máscaras	December 4, 2013	Mazada and Nosawa Rongai

=== Tokyo World Heavyweight Championship ===
Tokyo World Heavyweight Championship

Details
- Promotion: Tokyo Gurentai
- Date established: April 15, 2010
- Current champion: Fujita
- Date won: September 25, 2019
Statistics
- First champion: Nosawa Rongai
- Most reigns: Fujita (2 reigns)
- Longest reign: Masaaki Mochizuki (959 days)
- Shortest reign: Akira (57 days)
- Oldest champion: Akira (53 years, 139 days)
- Youngest champion: Nosawa Rongai (33 years, 119 days)
- Heaviest champion: Sanshiro Takagi (231 lbs)
- Lightest champion: Nosawa Rongai (176 lbs)

Key
No.	Overall reign number
Reign	Reign number for the specific champion
Days	Number of days held
<1	Reign lasted less than a day
+	Current reign is changing daily

No.	Champion	Championship change			Reign statistics		Notes	Ref.
No.	Champion	Date	Event	Location	Reign	Days	Notes	Ref.
1	Nosawa Rongai	April 15, 2010	Tokyo Love Spring Battle	Tokyo, Japan	1	531	Defeated Fujita, Mazada and Kikuzawa in a four-way elimination match to become the inaugural champion.	
2	Sanshiro Takagi	September 28, 2011	Tokyo Love II Another Chance	Tokyo, Japan	1	476		
3	Fujita	January 16, 2013	Tokyo Love III We Are T*okyo	Tokyo, Japan	1	694		
4	Mazada	December 11, 2014	Tokyo Dream 2014	Tokyo, Japan	1	355		
5	Masaaki Mochizuki	December 1, 2015	Tokyo Dream 2015 ~ NOSAWA Rongai 20th Anniversary Show	Tokyo, Japan	1	959		
6	Kaz Hayashi	July 17, 2018	Tokyo Love VIII	Tokyo, Japan	1	378		
7	Akira	July 30, 2019	Tokyo Carnival 2019	Tokyo, Japan	1	57		
8	Fujita	September 25, 2019	Tokyo Dream 2019	Tokyo, Japan	2	2,490+		

=== Combined reigns ===
†	Indicates the current champion

Rank	Wrestler	No. of reigns	Combined days
1	Fujita †	2	3,184+
2	Masaaki Mochizuki	1	959
3	Nosawa Rongai	1	531
4	Sanshiro Takagi	1	476
5	Kaz Hayashi	1	378
6	Mazada	1	355
7	Akira	1	57

=== Tokyo Intercontinental Tag Team Championship ===
Tokyo Intercontinental Tag Team Championship

Details
- Promotion: Tokyo Gurentai
- Date established: April 7, 2014
- Current champions: Dick Togo and Mazada
- Date won: September 25, 2019
Statistics
- First champions: HUB and Mazada
- Most reigns: As an individual: Mazada (3 reigns); As a team: All teams (1 reign)
- Longest reign: Hikaru Sato and Masaaki Mochizuki (373 days)
- Shortest reign: Yankee Two Kenju (Isami Kodaka and Yuko Miyamoto) (71 days)
- Oldest champion: Mitsuo Momota (66 years, 297 days)
- Youngest champion: Rocky Kawamura (34 years, 280 days)
- Heaviest champion: Kikutaro (231 lbs)
- Lightest champion: Stalker Ichikawa (143 lbs)

Key
No.	Overall reign number
Reign	Reign number for the specific team—reign numbers for the individuals are in parentheses, if different
Days	Number of days held
<1	Reign lasted less than a day
+	Current reign is changing daily

No.	Champion	Championship change			Reign statistics		Notes	Ref.
No.	Champion	Date	Event	Location	Reign	Days	Notes	Ref.
1	HUB and Mazada	April 7, 2014	House show	Tokyo, Japan	1	91	No documentation attests this title win. HUB and Mazada were billed as inaugural champions under unknown circumstances.	
2	Hikaru Sato and Masaaki Mochizuki	July 7, 2014	Tokyo Starrcade ~ Tanabatayaro A-Team	Tokyo, Japan	1	373	This was a three-way tag team match also involving Dr. Wagner Jr. and Nosawa Rongai.	
3	Chikara and Mitsuo Momota	July 15, 2015	Tokyo Love 5 ~ Next Innovation ~	Tokyo, Japan	1	139		
4	Kikutaro/Kikusan Hansen and Stalker Ichikawa/Stan Ichikawa	December 1, 2015	Tokyo Dream 2015 ~ NOSAWA Rongai 20th Anniversary Show	Tokyo, Japan	1	125	During this reign, Kikutaro was also known as Kikusan Hansen and Stalker Ichikawa as Stan Ichikawa.	
5	Hikaru Sato (2) and Rocky Kawamura	April 6, 2016	Tokyo Love VI ~ Road To Future	Tokyo, Japan	1	238		
6	Dick Togo and Shiryu	November 28, 2016	Tokyo Dream 2016	Tokyo, Japan	1	303		
7	Tokyo Gurentai (Fujita and Mazada (2))	September 27, 2017	Tokyo Love VII	Tokyo, Japan	1	293		
8	Yankee Two Kenju (Isami Kodaka and Yuko Miyamoto)	July 17, 2018	Tokyo Love VIII	Tokyo, Japan	1	71		
9	Masaaki Mochizuki (2) and Rocky Kawamura (2)	September 26, 2018	Tokyo Carnival 2018	Tokyo, Japan	1	364	Takumi Tsukamoto replaced Isami Kodaka after Kodaka got injured and unable to defend the titles.	
10	Dick Togo (2) and Mazada (3)	September 25, 2019	Tokyo Dream 2019	Tokyo, Japan	1	2,490+		

=== Combined reigns ===
†	Indicates the current champion

Rank	Team	No. of reigns	Combined days
1	Hikaru Sato and Masaaki Mochizuki	1	373
2	Masaaki Mochizuki and Rocky Kawamura	1	364
3	Dick Togo and Mazada †	1	2,490+
4	Dick Togo and Shiryu	1	303
5	Tokyo Gurentai (Fujita and Mazada)	1	293
6	Hikaru Sato and Rocky Kawamura	1	238
7	Chikara and Mitsuo Momota	1	139
8	Kikutaro/Kikusan Hansen and Stalker Ichikawa/Stan Ichikawa	1	125
9	HUB and Mazada	1	91
10	Yankee Two Kenju (Isami Kodaka and Yuko Miyamoto)	1	71

=== By wrestler ===
Rank	Wrestler	No. of reigns	Combined days
1	Masaaki Mochizuki	2	737
2	Mazada †	3	2,820+
3	Dick Togo †	2	2,793+
4	Hikaru Sato	2	611
5	Rocky Kawamura	2	608
6	Shiryu	1	303
7	Fujita	1	293
8	Chikara	1	139
8	Mitsuo Momota	1	139
10	Kikutaro/Kikusan Hansen	1	125
10	Stalker Ichikawa/Stan Ichikawa	1	125
12	HUB	1	91
13	Isami Kodaka	1	71
13	Yuko Miyamoto	1	71

== Championships and accomplishments ==
- All Japan Pro Wrestling
  - AJPW Junior Tag League (2006) – Mazada and Nosawa
- Apache Pro-Wrestling Army
  - WEW World Tag Team Championship (1 time) – Mazada and Nosawa
- DDT Pro-Wrestling
  - UWA World Trios Championship (2 times) – Fujita, Mazada and Nosawa
- International Wrestling Revolution Group
  - IWRG Intercontinental Tag Team Championship (1 time) – Mazada and Nosawa
  - IWRG Intercontinental Trios Championship (1 time) – Mazada, Nosawa and Takemura
- Mobius
  - Apex of Triangle Six-Man Tag Team Championship (1 time) – Mazada, Nosawa and Takemura
- Tokyo Gurentai
  - Tokyo Intercontinental Tag Team Championship (2 times) – Mazada and Hub (1), and Fujita and Mazada (1)
  - Tokyo World Heavyweight Championship (2 times) – Nosawa (1) and Fujita (1)
  - Tokyo World Tag Team Championship (1 time) – Mazada and Nosawa
- Wrestle-1
  - Wrestle-1 Cruiser Division Championship (1 time) – Mazada
  - UWA World Trios Championship (1 time) – Fujita, Mazada and Nosawa

== See also ==
- Puroresu
