= Hiroshi Yamato =

Japanese professional wrestler (born 1983)

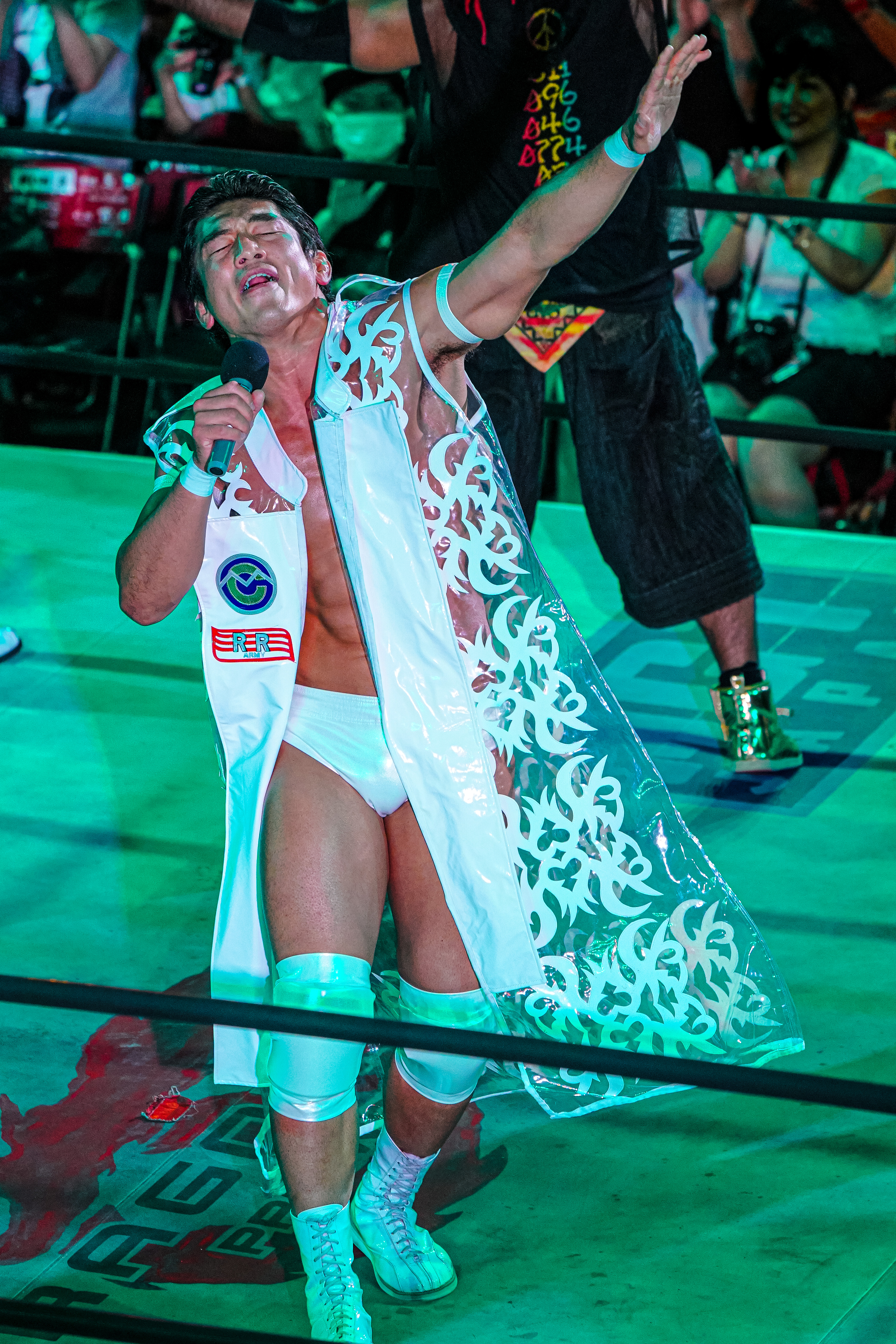
- Yamato in July 2019

Personal information
- Born: Hiroshi Mihara; October 20, 1983 (age 43) Kimitsu, Chiba, Japan

Professional wrestling career
- Ring name(s): Hijikata Toshizō; Hiroshi Yamato; Kick-Ass; Yamato
- Billed height: 1.77 m (5 ft 9 1/2 in)
- Billed weight: 82 kg (181 lb)
- Trained by: Animal Hamaguchi; Kaz Hayashi; Keiji Mutoh; Virus
- Debut: February 22, 2007

Hiroshi Mihara (三原 弘嗣, Mihara Hiroshi; born October 20, 1983), better known by his ring name Hiroshi Yamato (大和ヒロシ, Yamato Hiroshi), is a Japanese professional wrestler who works as a freelancer. Trained by the All Japan Pro Wrestling promotion, he started his career in February 2007 working in Mexico for the International Wrestling Revolution Group (IWRG) promotion, where he won the 2007 Rey del Ring tournament. Yamato returned to Japan and his home promotion in February 2008 and during the next five years went on to become a one-time World Junior Heavyweight and All Asia Tag Team Champion and the winner of the 2012 Junior Hyper League. In June 2013, Yamato left All Japan in a mass exodus to join the new Wrestle-1 promotion. In January 2016, Yamato won the Wrestle-1 Cruiser Division Championship. Yamato also worked as a trainer and sales manager for Wrestle-1 until his departure from the promotion in 2018.

== Early life ==
Mihara is an alum of Tokyo University of Agriculture, which he represented at the 2002 JOC Junior Olympic Cup, where he finished third at 76 kg (168 lb) weight class in amateur wrestling.

== Professional wrestling career ==
=== All Japan Pro Wrestling (2007–2013) ===
Mihara was originally trained in professional wrestling at the All Japan Pro Wrestling (AJPW) dojo, before going on a learning excursion to Mexico, where he made his in-ring debut on February 22, 2007, in a tag team match, where he, performing under the ring name Yamato, and fellow All Japan debutant Kai faced Los Traumas (Trauma I and Trauma II). Mihara spent the rest of 2007 in Mexico, losing his hair to Cerebro Negro in a Lucha de Apuestas on June 21 and winning the 2007 Rey del Ring on July 26. Mihara finally returned to Japan and All Japan Pro Wrestling in February 2008, adopting the ring name Hiroshi Yamato and forming a regular partnership with Kai, which eventually led to the two coming together with Satoshi Kojima and Zodiac to form the stable F4 (Friend, Fight, Fan and Future). Through the new alliance, Yamato also made his debut for New Japan Pro-Wrestling on October 13, 2008, at Destruction '08, in a six-man tag team match, where he, Kai and Kojima were defeated by Great Bash Heel (Togi Makabe, Tomohiro Ishii and Toru Yano). On December 14, Yamato, Kai and Kojima faced each other in a special three-way elimination match, where Yamato was victorious, scoring pinfalls over both of his opponents. Yamato continued teaming with Kai throughout 2009, with the two entering the 2009 Junior Tag League in April, from which they were eliminated after losing to the team of Petey Williams and Phil Atlas in their final round-robin match. On January 3, 2010, Yamato won the annual junior heavyweight battle royal in Korakuen Hall. As a result, he was granted his first shot at the World Junior Heavyweight Championship, but was defeated in the title match on January 11 by the defending champion, Kaz Hayashi. F4's long storyline rivalry with the Voodoo Murders stable built to a four-on-four match on February 7, 2010, where F4 was defeated and, as a result, forced to disband.

With his tag team with Kai behind him, Yamato went on to form a new partnership with Shuji Kondo and continued his rivalry with the Voodoo Murders. On July 1, 2010, Yamato and Kondo unsuccessfully challenged Voodoo Murders members Big Daddy Voodoo and Taru for the All Asia Tag Team Championship. Later that same month, Yamato entered the 2010 Junior League, where he finished second in his round-robin block with three wins and two losses, advancing to the semifinals. However, on August 8, he was eliminated from the tournament in the semifinals by former tag team partner Kai. In April 2011, Yamato and Kondo took part in the 2011 Junior Tag League, from which they were eliminated after losing to the Voodoo Murders team of Mazada and Super Hate in their final round-robin match. Afterwards, Yamato broke away from Kondo and set his sights on the World Junior Heavyweight Championship, but was unable to capture the title from Kai in their title match on August 13, 2011. Yamato received another title shot on January 3, 2012, but was again defeated by the defending champion, this time Kenny Omega. On February 14, Yamato reunited with Shuji Kondo to unsuccessfully challenge Atsushi Aoki and Kotaro Suzuki for Pro Wrestling Noah's GHC Junior Heavyweight Tag Team Championship.

In April, Yamato took part in the 2012 Junior Tag League alongside DDT Pro-Wrestling and Pancrase representative Hikaru Sato, with the two failing to advance from their round-robin block. The following July, Yamato entered the 2012 Junior Hyper League, where he finished second in his round-robin block with three wins, one draw and one loss. On July 29, Yamato first defeated Koji Kanemoto in his semifinal match and then Shuji Kondo in the finals to win the tournament. This led to a match on August 12, where Yamato defeated Kai to win the World Junior Heavyweight Championship for the first time. Before the end of the year, Yamato racked up five successful title defenses, against Minoru Tanaka, Hikaru Sato, Kenny Omega, Kaz Hayashi, and Koji Kanemoto. On January 2, 2013, Yamato lost the title to Shuji Kondo in a match, which was also contested for Kondo's GHC Junior Heavyweight Championship. The following day, Yamato bounced back by winning his second annual junior heavyweight battle royal. That same day, Yamato reunited with Hikaru Sato to formally challenge the Junior Stars of Koji Kanemoto and Minoru Tanaka for the All Asia Tag Team Championship. On January 10, Yamato and Sato held a public training session, during which they shaved each other's heads to show that they were a cohesive unit ahead of their upcoming title match. On January 26, the team, billed as "Jounetsu Hentai Baka", defeated the Junior Stars to become the new All Asia Tag Team Champions. After only a fifteen-day reign, Yamato and Sato lost the title back to Kanemoto and Tanaka on February 10. From March 30 to April 7, Yamato and Sato took part in the 2013 Junior Hyper Tag League, where they made it all the way to the finals, before losing to Burning (Atsushi Aoki and Kotaro Suzuki), whom they had defeated in their opening match of the tournament. Afterwards, Yamato set his sights on regaining the World Junior Heavyweight Championship, pinning reigning champion Yoshinobu Kanemaru on April 29 in a six-man tag team match, where he, Koji Kanemoto and Minoru Tanaka faced the Burning trio of Kanemaru, Atsushi Aoki and Kotaro Suzuki. On June 2, Yamato unsuccessfully challenged Kanemaru for the World Junior Heavyweight Championship. On June 20, Yamato announced his resignation from All Japan out of loyalty to his trainer Keiji Mutoh, who had left the promotion when Nobuo Shiraishi took over as its new president at the beginning of the month. Prior to leaving All Japan, Yamato was entered into one more storyline, where a disappointed Hikaru Sato announced his return to the promotion to take on his former Jounetsu Hentai Baka partner. On June 30, Yamato was defeated by Sato in his final All Japan match, a three-way match, which also included Kazushi Miyamoto.

=== Wrestle-1 (2013–2018) ===
On July 10, 2013, Keiji Mutoh held a press conference to announce the foundation of his new Wrestle-1 promotion, announcing Yamato as part of its roster. During Wrestle-1's inaugural event on September 8, Yamato wrestled in the opening match, where he and the debuting Daiki Inaba defeated Tokyo Gurentai (Mazada and Nosawa Rongai). During the second event on September 15, Yamato took part in the debut match of another Wrestle-1 trainee, Seiki Yoshioka, picking up the win in a singles match. Through Wrestle-1's working relationship with Pro Wrestling Zero1, Yamato made his debut for the promotion on September 28, teaming with Yasufumi Nakanoue in a tag team match, where they were defeated by Kazma Sakamoto and Ryoji Sai, representing a stable led by Wrestle-1's Masayuki Kono. The following day, Yamato produced his own small outdoor professional wrestling event in Chiba, during which he and Daiki Inaba defeated Kai and Ryota Hama in a tag team match. Yamato produced a larger event on October 26 in Ōamishirasato, Chiba, where he and Kai defeated Nosawa Rongai and Yoshihiro Takayama in a main event tag team match. On October 6, Yamato surprisingly announced that he wanted to join Tokyo Gurentai, with whom he had feuded since the start of Wrestle-1, but his direct appeal was turned down by Nosawa. Despite being rejected, Yamato appeared at the November 16 Korakuen Hall event with a new villainous persona, bleached blonde look and the new ring name Yamato (written in Roman alphabets and stylized in all capital letters), trying to force his way into Tokyo Gurentai. As Tokyo Gurentai still refused to accept him as an official member, Yamato worked the rest of the November tour under his old look and ring name, going up against members of the stable. On December 1, Yamato again appeared under his Tokyo Gurentai look, teaming with Nosawa and Mazada in a six-man tag team match, where they defeated Andy Wu, Daiki Inaba and Seiki Yoshioka, with Yamato scoring the pinfall over Inaba. Later that same event, Yamato's outside interference ruined a three-way match between Kaz Hayashi, El Pantera and Shuji Kondo and led to a three-way nine-man tag team match between those three, the team of Wu, Inaba and Yoshioka, and Yamato, Nosawa and Mazada. The Tokyo Gurentai trio lost the match, after Mazada turned on Yamato and hit him with a shinai. On January 31, Yamato apologized to Daiki Inaba and pledged that his days of trying to get into Tokyo Gurentai were over.

On April 17, Yamato defeated Kazushi Miyamoto in a "Chance Contra Chance" match and was, as a result, allowed to make a wish for his future. Yamato then announced he was going to be releasing a music CD and challenging for European Wrestling Promotion's (EWP) Intercontinental Championship. Yamato received his title shot on May 4, but was defeated by the defending champion, Leon Van Gasteren. Yamato received a rematch for the title on July 6 at Wrestle-1's second Ryōgoku Kokugikan event, Shōgeki: Impact, where he defeated Van Gasteren to become the new EWP Intercontinental Champion. In September, Yamato traveled to Hannover, Germany, where he wrestled Van Gasteren to a draw at an EWP event on September 20, making his first successful defense of the EWP Intercontinental Championship. Back in Japan two days later, Yamato entered the Wrestle-1 Championship tournament, defeating Seiki Yoshioka in his first round match. The following day, Yamato was eliminated from the tournament in the second round by Shuji Kondo. In November, Yamato teamed up with Seiya Sanada for the First Tag League Greatest tournament, set to determine the inaugural Wrestle-1 Tag Team Champions. The team finished their block with a record of one win, two draws and one loss, narrowly missing advancement to the semifinals. On December 7, Yamato lost the EWP Intercontinental Championship to Minoru Tanaka in his second title defense. On April 19, 2015, Yamato entered a tournament to crown the inaugural Wrestle-1 Cruiser Division Champion, defeating Rionne Fujiwara in his first round match. He was eliminated from the tournament in the semifinals on May 5 by Kaz Hayashi. Yamato received his first shot at the title on June 7, but was defeated by the defending champion, Minoru Tanaka. On August 3, Yamato was announced as one of five trainers at Wrestle-1's new Puroresu Sōgō Gakuin ("Pro wrestling comprehensive school").

On January 10, 2016, Yamato defeated Andy Wu to win the Wrestle-1 Cruiser Division Championship. He made his first successful title defense on February 10 against Daiki Inaba. On March 6, Yamato was hospitalized after suffering a neck injury during a match. Preliminary diagnosis suspected that he had suffered a cervical spine injury. As a result of the injury, Yamato was forced to relinquish the Wrestle-1 Cruiser Division Championship. Yamato returned from his injury on August 11. On October 11, Yamato announced he would be forced to undergo a neck surgery later that month, which would sideline him for at least six months. During his hiatus, Yamato would concentrate on his new role as Wrestle-1's sales manager.

=== Freelance (2018–present) ===
In March 2018, Yamato announced he would be leaving Wrestle-1 to become a freelancer. In his last match under W1 contract, he and Alejandro defeated Jun Tonsho and Seiki Yoshioka. In April, Yamato announced he would begin competing in Pro Wrestling Zero1, and took part in the promotion's 2018 Fire Festival, where he finished with 10 points. Yamato also began working for Kaientai Dojo, and unsuccessfully challenged Taka Michinoku for the UWA World Middleweight Championship in September. Yamato also began competing in Pro Wrestling Noah, Dradition, Heat Up and Asuka Project throughout the latter half of 2018.

== Personal life ==
Mihara married a woman named Chisato in 2009. She gave birth to the couple's first child, a baby boy, on March 27, 2013. In October 2014, Mihara took part in Best Body Japan's eastern Japan "Mister Best Physique" competition, where he finished third. As a result, he earned a spot in the national finals the following December, where he finished eighth. Mihara is a qualified personal fitness trainer, high school agriculture teacher, assistant surveyor, retail salesperson and hazardous materials engineer.

== Championships and accomplishments ==
- All Japan Pro Wrestling

- All Asia Tag Team Championship (1 time) – with Hikaru Sato
- World Junior Heavyweight Championship (1 time)
- Junior Hyper League (2012)
- New Year Junior Heavyweight Battle Royal (2010, 2013)

- European Wrestling Promotion

- EWP Intercontinental Championship (1 time)

- Best Body Japan Pro-Wrestling

- BBW Tag Team Championship (1 time) – with Seiya Morohashi

- Niigata Pro Wrestling
  - Niigata Tag Team Championship (1 time) - with Koji Iwamoto
- DDT Pro-Wrestling

- Ironman Heavymetalweight Championship (1 time) – with Toru Owashi
- KO-D 8-Man Tag Team Championship (1 time) – with Yoshiaki Yatsu, Akito and Keigo Nakamura

- International Wrestling Revolution Group

- Rey del Ring (2007)

- Wrestle-1

- Wrestle-1 Cruiser Division Championship (1 time)

=== Luchas de Apuestas ===
Wager	Winner	Loser	Location	Date	Notes
Hair	Cerebro Negro	Yamato	Naucalpan, State of Mexico, Mexico	June 21, 2007	Lost a three-way Parejas Suicidas tag team match against Dr. Cerebro and Kai, and El Felino and El Pantera and were forced to face each other.
