= Wrestle-1 Cruiser Division Championship =

Professional wrestling championship

- The Wrestle-1 Cruiser Division Championship belt (March 2015 — Present)

Details
- Promotion: Wrestle-1
- Date established: February 25, 2015
- Date retired: April 1, 2020
Statistics
- First champion: Minoru Tanaka
- Final champion: Seiki Yoshioka
- Most reigns: Andy Wu (4 reigns)
- Longest reign: Kotaro Suzuki (151 days)
- Shortest reign: Seiki Yoshioka (30 days)
- Oldest champion: Minoru Tanaka (42 years, 157 days)
- Youngest champion: Andy Wu (23–24 years)
- Heaviest champion: Mazada (87 kg (192 lb))
- Lightest champion: Seiki Yoshioka(77 kg (170 lb))

The Wrestle-1 Cruiser Division Championship (WRESTLE-1クルーザーディビジョンチャンピオンシップ, Wrestle-1 Kurūzā Dibijon Chanpionshippu) is a professional wrestling championship owned by the Wrestle-1 (W-1) promotion. The title is meant for cruiserweight wrestlers and holds a weight limit of 200 lb (91 kg).

Like most professional wrestling championships, the title is won as a result of a scripted match. There have been fifteen reigns shared among eight wrestlers.

== History ==
When Wrestle-1 was founded in 2013, one of its main focuses was to build an openweight division, where its wrestlers would not be typecast as heavyweights or junior heavyweights, like in most Japanese promotions, but would be able to interact with each other across weight limits. However, on February 13, 2015, after Kaz Hayashi and Shuji Kondo had successfully defended the Wrestle-1 Tag Team Championship against Minoru Tanaka and Seiki Yoshioka, Hayashi announced he was interested in building a division for Wrestle-1's lighter wrestlers, electing to call the proposed division a "cruiserweight" division instead of the "junior heavyweight" division, which is more common in Japanese puroresu, and reminiscing of Mutoh and Hayashi's stints in WCW in the 1990s. This led to a match on February 22, billed as an "assessment match" to a possible cruiserweight division, where Tanaka defeated Hayashi. Following the match, Tanaka, Andy Wu, El Hijo del Pantera, Hiroshi Yamato, Rionne Fujiwara, Seiki Yoshioka and Yusuke Kodama voiced their support for a cruiserweight division in Wrestle-1. On February 25, Wrestle-1 officially announced the creation of a cruiserweight division and the promotion's third title, a cruiserweight championship.

In May 2016, Kotaro Suzuki made the title's first international defenses by defeating Mark Haskins and Ultimo Tiger in England at events held by 4 Front Wrestling and Pro Wrestling Pride.

=== Championship tournament ===
On March 9, 2015, Wrestle-1 officially presented the new title, naming it the "Wrestle-1 Cruiser Division Championship". It was announced that the title holds a weight limit of 200 lb (91 kg) that wrestlers need to make the day before a title match. Also announced was an eight-man single-elimination tournament that would culminate on May 5 with the crowning of the first champion. The championship belt was officially unveiled on March 31 at a press conference, where all participants in the tournament underwent and passed a weigh-in. On May 5, Minoru Tanaka defeated Kaz Hayashi in the finals of the tournament to become the inaugural Wrestle-1 Cruiser Division Champion.

First round (April 1, 19)
Minoru Tanaka	Pin
Seiki Yoshioka	17:26
Andy Wu	Pin
El Hijo del Pantera	08:08
Kaz Hayashi	Pin
Yusuke Kodama	17:52
Hiroshi Yamato	Pin
Rionne Fujiwara	09:31

Semifinals (May 5)
Minoru Tanaka	Sub
El Hijo del Pantera	07:43
Kaz Hayashi	Pin
Hiroshi Yamato	14:38

Finals (May 5)
Minoru Tanaka	Pin
Kaz Hayashi	23:53

== Title history ==
Key
No.	Overall reign number
Reign	Reign number for the specific champion
Days	Number of days held
Defenses	Number of successful defenses
+	Current reign is changing daily

No.	Champion	Championship change			Reign statistics			Notes	Ref.
No.	Champion	Date	Event	Location	Reign	Days	Defenses	Notes	Ref.
1	Minoru Tanaka	May 5, 2015	Triumph	Tokyo	1	141	5	Tanaka defeated Kaz Hayashi in the finals of an eight-man tournament to become the inaugural champion.	
2	Andy Wu	September 23, 2015	2nd Anniversary	Osaka	1	109	3		
3	Hiroshi Yamato	January 10, 2016	Sunrise	Tokyo	1	58	1		
—	Vacated	March 8, 2016	—	—	—	—	—	Yamato was stripped of the title after suffering a neck injury.	
4	Kotaro Suzuki	March 13, 2016	Trans Magic	Tokyo	1	151	5	Suzuki defeated Minoru Tanaka in the finals of a four-man tournament to win the vacant title.	
5	Yusuke Kodama	August 11, 2016	Puroresu Love in Yokohama	Yokohama	1	120	3		
6	Mazada	December 9, 2016	Shining Winter	Tokyo	1	101	1		
7	Seiki Yoshioka	March 20, 2017	Trans Magic	Tokyo	1	30	0		
8	Andy Wu	April 19, 2017	Cherry Blossom	Tokyo	2	15	0		
9	Mazada	May 4, 2017	Triumph	Tokyo	2	73	1		
10	Andy Wu	July 16, 2017	Symbol	Osaka	3	48	0		
11	Seiki Yoshioka	September 2, 2017	2017 Puroresu Love in Yokohama	Yokohama	2	284	4		
12	Yusuke Kodama	June 13, 2018	2018 Outbreak	Tokyo	2	311	4		
13	Andy Wu	April 20, 2019	Tour 2019 Cherry Blossom	Aga	4	134	1		
14	El Hijo del Pantera	September 1, 2019	Puroresu Love in Yokohama 2019	Yokohama	1	116	2		
15	Seiki Yoshioka	December 26, 2019	W-1 WRESTLE-1 Tour 2019 Shining Winter	Tokyo	3	97	1		
—	Deactivated	April 1, 2020	—	—	—	—	—	Deactivated when Wrestle-1 closed.	

== Combined reigns ==
Rank	Wrestler	No. of reigns	Combined defenses	Combined days
1	Yusuke Kodama	2	7	431
2	Seiki Yoshioka	3	5	427
3	Andy Wu	4	4	307
4	Mazada	2	2	174
5	Kotaro Suzuki	1	5	151
6	Minoru Tanaka	1	5	141
7	El Hijo del Pantera	1	2	116
8	Hiroshi Yamato	1	1	58

== See also ==
- World Junior Heavyweight Championship (AJPW)
- IWGP Junior Heavyweight Championship
- GHC Junior Heavyweight Championship
- International Junior Heavyweight Championship (Zero1)
- WCW World Cruiserweight Championship
