= Minoru Tanaka (wrestler) =

Japanese professional wrestler (born 1972)

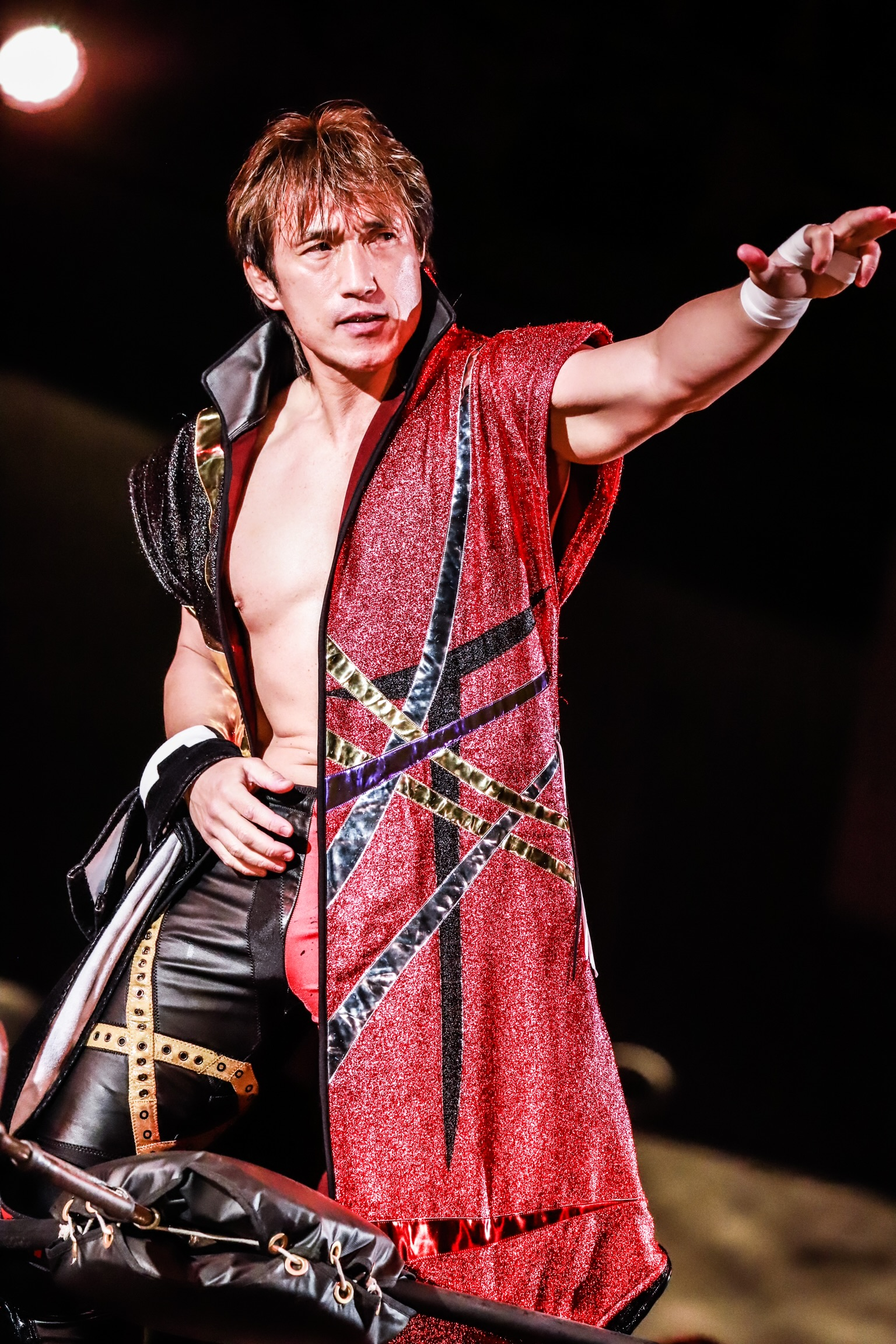
- Tanaka in November 2022

Personal information
- Born: November 29, 1972 (age 53) Komaki, Aichi, Japan
- Spouse: Yumi Fukawa (m. 2002)
- Children: 2 (including Kizuna Tanaka)

Professional wrestling career
- Ring name(s): C.T.U Ranger Pink; Heat; Minoru; Minoru Polnareff; Minoru Tanaka; The Orange Prince; Tanaka; Trans-Am★Tanaka; Watanabe no Tsuna
- Billed height: 1.75 m (5 ft 9 in)
- Billed weight: 85 kg (187 lb)
- Trained by: Yoshiaki Fujiwara
- Debut: January 24, 1994

Minoru Tanaka (田中稔, Tanaka Minoru; born November 29, 1972), also known by the ring names Heat (ヒート, Hīto) and the mononymous Minoru (稔, Minoru), is a Japanese professional wrestler, shoot wrestler and mixed martial artist. He is currently signed to Gleat, predominantly performing in its G Prowrestling and Lidet UWF divisions; he also serves as Gleat's UWF Rules Technical Officer.

Known as "The Special One", Tanaka first gained prominence in Pro Wrestling Fujiwara Gumi (PWFG) and Fighting Investigation Team Battlarts (Battlarts) before moving on to New Japan Pro-Wrestling (NJPW), where he became a four time IWGP Junior Heavyweight Champion, a five time IWGP Junior Heavyweight Tag Team Champion and the winner of the 2006 Best of the Super Juniors tournament. After leaving NJPW, he joined All Japan Pro Wrestling (AJPW), where he found continued success in the junior heavyweight and tag team ranks upon winning the World Junior Heavyweight Championship once and the All Asia Tag Team Championship twice. From 2013 to 2016, Tanaka worked for Wrestle-1. He also performed for Pro Wrestling Noah (Noah), where he held the GHC Junior Heavyweight Tag Team Championship twice and is a former GHC Junior Heavyweight Champion, making him the second man (after Naomichi Marufuji) to hold all three major Japanese junior heavyweight singles titles as well as the only man to hold all five major junior heavyweight titles in Japan (counting the aforementioned tag team prizes).

== Professional wrestling career ==
=== Early years (1994–1999) ===
Minoru Tanaka was originally a shootboxer. He started his career as a wrestler in Fujiwara Gumi, trained by its owner, Yoshiaki Fujiwara. In late 1995, Tanaka and everyone else in the promotion abandoned Fujiwara and formed their own promotion, Battlarts, led by Yuki Ishikawa. Despite being a simulated shoot style professional wrestling promotion, Battlarts, like its predecessor, often cooperated with other federations and styles, such as Fighting Network Rings (where he competed in some legitimate shoot fights), Kingdom, Michinoku Pro and Big Japan Pro Wrestling. Tanaka's first championship, the UWA World Middleweight Championship (originally based in Mexico and introduced in Japan through Universal Lucha Libre and Michinoku), came in 1996. He later won Frontier Martial Arts Wrestling's Independent World Junior Heavyweight Championship (which was outsourced to Battlarts after Hiromichi Fuyuki abolished all previous FMW titles and replaced them with WEW titles). Tanaka made a one-night appearance for the World Wrestling Federation on July 28, 1998, in a dark match on Shotgun Saturday Night defeating Christopher Daniels in San Diego, California.

=== New Japan Pro-Wrestling (1999–2009) ===
==== Early success (1999–2002) ====
Tanaka made his New Japan Pro-Wrestling debut on April 10, 1999, and would proceed to take part in Best of the Super Juniors in block B. Tanaka would reappear for New Japan in late 1999 to early 2000 before he joined the New Japan roster as a full-time competitor. His natural talent enabled him to immediately rise in the junior heavyweight ranks and win the IWGP Junior Heavyweight Tag Team Championship in July with Koji Kanemoto, who used a similar but more ground-oriented style. The Kanemoto-Tanaka combination was reminiscent of the old Akira Maeda-Nobuhiko Takada combination in 1987. In October, Tanaka won the IWGP Junior Heavyweight Championship - thus becoming the first man to hold both junior titles at the same time. In March 2001, Tanaka and Kanemoto lost their titles to El Samurai and Jushin Thunder Liger, in June he lost in the finals of 2001's Best of the Super Juniors to Liger and in July he lost his singles title. Even with all these losses, Tanaka finished 2001 strong, winning the G1 Jr. Six Man Tag Team Tournament Masahito Kakihara and Masayuki Naruse. For a second time in his career, Tanaka held both junior titles, defeating Masahito Kakihara for the IWGP Junior Heavyweight Champion and defeating Gedo and Jado with Jushin Thunder Liger for the IWGP Junior Heavyweight Tag Team Championship. After Koji Kanemoto defeated Tanaka in 2002's Best of the Super Juniors, Kanemoto defeated Tanaka once again for his IWGP Junior Heavyweight Championship, and a month later lost his tag team championship to Tsuyoshi Kikuchi and Yoshinobu Kanemaru.

==== Control Terrorism Unit (2002–2007) ====
In late 2002 Tanaka began wearing a mask and calling himself "HEAT" (ヒート) in reference to the Game Boy Advance video game Toukon Heat. In only his second match under the persona, Tanaka faced on Kanemoto in an attempt to regain the title but failed. Like the game, the HEAT character often floundered in his early years with the only positive being his victory of the Naeba Cup Tag Tournament alongside Manabu Nakanishi. Heat finally began to pick up steam in 2003, and defeated Jado in December to become a three-time IWGP Junior Heavyweight Champion. In September 2004, Heat returned to his birth name and reunited with Kanemoto to challenge Gedo and Jado for the IWGP Junior Heavyweight Tag Team Championship. Before the match could end, however, Minoru turned on Kanemoto and helped Gedo and Jado win, turning heel and joining CTU in the process. Heat's true success came after turning heel, though he competed as both Heat and simply Minoru Tanaka after joining CTU. After losing to Tiger Mask in the semi-final of the 2004 Best of the Super Juniors, he found his new rival and defeated Tiger Mask. Their rivalry continued over the year and culminated at Toukon Festival: Wrestling World where Heat lost his IWGP Junior Heavyweight Championship to Tiger Mask. After this loss, he officially dropped the mask and began wrestling as Minoru Tanaka once again until dropping his surname, calling himself Minoru (稔, Minoru). He also competed as Masked CTU-J sporadically from this point forward. On May 14, Minoru teamed up with new CTU recruit Hirooki Goto and defeated Koji Kanemoto and Wataru Inoue to become a three-time IWGP Junior Heavyweight Tag Team Champion and would lose them to El Samurai and Ryusuke Taguchi in early 2006.

In 2006, Minoru joined the American Total Nonstop Action Wrestling promotion as a member of Team Japan (consisting of Hirooki Goto, Jushin Thunder Liger, Black Tiger and Minoru), one of the four teams competing in the TNA 2006 World X-Cup Tournament. He debuted in TNA on April 23, 2006, at Lockdown, where he teamed with Hirooki Goto against Team USA members Sonjay Dutt, Jay Lethal and Alex Shelley. Team Japan defeated USA when Black Tiger pinned Lethal. On the April 27 episode of Impact!, Goto and Minoru lost to Dutt and Shelley, giving a first round victory and two points to Team USA.

Following his stint in TNA, Minoru managed to find success upon returning to Japan, as he won the 2006 Best of the Super Juniors after defeating Tiger Mask in the finals. Minoru lost his chance at the IWGP Junior Heavyweight Championship in October, but would be granted another one at "Battle Xmas! Catch the Victory", where he defeated Koji Kanemoto for the title, making him a four-time IWGP Junior Heavyweight Champion. He would hold the title until he was defeated by Ryusuke Taguchi. After this loss, CTU would take a turn for the worse and eventually disbanded on August 8 where all members would wrestle under their Masked CTU personas.

==== RISE (2007–2009) ====
In late 2007, after the break up of CTU, some of the former members, which included Prince Devitt, Hirooki Goto and Minoru along with Shinsuke Nakamura, formed the stable RISE. In early 2008, Minoru and Devitt would win the IWGP Junior Heavyweight Tag Team Championship. However, they would lose the title not even a month later to members of the Legend stable, AKIRA and Jushin Thunder Liger. Minoru and Devitt defeated AKIRA and Liger in their return match for the IWGP Junior Heavyweight Tag Team Championship, making the pair two-time champions together and Minoru's fifth overall. They lost the titles in October to No Limit (Tetsuya Naito and Yujiro Takahashi). Minoru stayed out of the lime light during late 2008 and early 2009 making him unhappy with his status in the company. Along with Minoru becoming unable to come to terms on a new contract, he left New Japan after nearly a decade with the company January 31, 2009.

=== All Japan Pro Wrestling (2009–2013, 2017) ===
==== VooDoo Murders (2009–2011) ====
After leaving New Japan on January 31, 2009, in a shocking move, Tanaka quickly signed with rival promotion All Japan Pro Wrestling in late February and made his presence felt by joining the hated Voodoo Murders stable, replacing the recently retired brother YASSHI in the group. In his first All Japan pay-per-view, he took on Kaz Hayashi for the World Junior Heavyweight Championship and lost. Moving on from this loss, he teamed up with Toshizo to take part in 2009's AJPW Junior Tag League, where they defeated Kaz Hayashi and Shuji Kondo. After finishing top in Junior League 2009 he was defeated by Super Crazy in the semi-finals. In 2010, he participated in that years junior tournaments failing to win any of them but did come close in the Junior League where he lost to Jimmy Yang. In late 2010, he won an All Asia Tag Team Championship contendership tournament with KONO but failed to win the titles on the next night.

On January 2, 2011, Minoru won the World Junior Heavyweight Championship from Kaz Hayashi. On June 3, 2011, in the aftermath of a backstage fight between Yoshikazu Taru and Nobukazu Hirai, which resulted in Hirai suffering a stroke, All Japan Pro Wrestling disbanded Voodoo Murders, suspended all of its Japanese members, including Minoru, and vacated the World Junior Heavyweight Championship. Minoru was suspended specifically for not attempting to stop Taru's assault on Hirai. Minoru's suspension was lifted on June 30. In October 2011, Minoru began once again wrestling under his full name. In an interview on All Japan's official website, Tanaka explained that by using his full name he wanted to pay tribute to his original home promotion BattlARTS, which closed its doors on November 5, 2011, and where he originally made his breakthrough under his full name.

==== Stack of Arms (2011–2013) ====
On December 21, Tanaka along with Masakatsu Funaki and Masayuki Kono formed the stable Stack of Arms. The stable tried to start of strong by winning the AJPW Junior Tag League 2012, but failed in their attempt, not even getting through the starting stages. From this point, Stack of Arms have feud against Team Destruction (Kaz Hayashi, Shuji Kondo and Suwama). When Koji Kanemoto joined Stack of Arms in October 2012, their fortunes turned around, Kanemoto and Tanaka defeated Kazushi Miyamoto and Tomoaki Honma to win the vacant All Asia Tag Team Championship. On January 26, 2013, Kanemoto and Tanaka, calling themselves Junior Stars but still part of Stack of Arms, lost the titles to Hikaru Sato and Hiroshi Yamato but would regain the title less than a month later. Their second reign ended on April 25, 2013, when they were defeated by Atsushi Aoki and Kotaro Suzuki. In June 2013, Tanaka, along with the rest of Stack of Arms, announced his resignation from All Japan in the aftermath of Nobuo Shiraishi taking over as the promotion's new president. On June 30, Tanaka unsuccessfully challenged Yoshinobu Kanemaru for the World Junior Heavyweight Championship in his final All Japan match.

==== Brief Return (2017) ====
In the beginning of 2017, Minoru Tanaka returned to AJPW after three and a half years of being away. As Nobuo Shiraishi had long been gone from the company, his original reason for leaving is gone. He returned on the January 2nd Korakuen and soon announced his participation in the 2017 Junior Battle of Glory. Unfortunately, Tanaka would fail to advance to the final after going 1–2–1 in four matches, only achieving three points but tied with AJPW Junior Champion Keisuke Ishii. He stayed in the company after the tournament, consistently working undercards. On July 17, he challenged fellow shooter Hikaru Sato for his recently won AJPW Junior Heavyweight Championship but was unsuccessful. Tanaka worked All Japan's 45th Anniversary Show in Sumo Hall on August 27, in a brief all-star tag-team match in the upper mid-card where he, Jun Akiyama, Koji Iwamoto, and Takao Omori got a quick victory. He would not stay much longer after this - his final match came on September 19 in an unsuccessful challenge for Jun Akiyama's GAORA TV Championship. He began working for Pro Wrestling NOAH full-time after this.

=== Wrestle-1 (2013–2016) ===
On July 10, 2013, Tanaka was announced as part of Keiji Mutoh's new Wrestle-1 promotion. During the promotion's inaugural event on September 8, Tanaka reunited the Junior Stars with Koji Kanemoto in a tag team match, where they defeated Fujita Hayato and Masaaki Mochizuki. On January 31, 2014, Tanaka celebrated his 20th anniversary in professional wrestling, teaming with Kanemoto and the debuting Jushin Thunder Liger and Yoshiaki Fujiwara in an eight-man tag team main event, where they defeated Desperado (Kazma Sakamoto, Masayuki Kono, René Duprée and Ryoji Sai). In September, Tanaka took part in the Wrestle-1 Championship tournament, where he made it to the second round, before losing to Kai. Through Wrestle-1's working relationship with American promotion Total Nonstop Action Wrestling (TNA), Tanaka worked TNA's Bound for Glory event in Tokyo on October 12, defeating Manik. On December 7, Tanaka defeated Hiroshi Yamato to win the European Wrestling Promotion (EWP) Intercontinental Championship. Later that month, Tanaka traveled to Hannover, Germany to successfully defend the title against Michael Kovac. Through Wrestle-1's relationship with Pro Wrestling Zero1, Tanaka won two more titles on March 1, 2015, when he defeated Jason Lee for the International Junior Heavyweight and NWA World Junior Heavyweight Championships. On May 5, Tanaka won yet another title, when he defeated Kaz Hayashi in the finals of a tournament to become the inaugural Wrestle-1 Cruiser Division Champion. Tanaka lost the first of his four titles on May 16, when Tajiri defeated him for the EWP Intercontinental Championship. He regained the title on May 30 in a match also contested for the Wrestle-1 Cruiser Division Championship. On September 12, Tanaka lost the EWP Intercontinental Championship to Robbie Dynamite in Hannover, Germany. On September 23, Tanaka lost the Wrestle-1 Cruiser Division Championship to Andy Wu in his sixth defense. On October 11, Tanaka lost his final two titles, the Zero1 junior heavyweight championships, to Shinjiro Otani. On January 31, 2016, Tanaka, Kaz Hayashi and Tajiri won the vacant UWA World Trios Championship. On June 28, Tanaka announced he was leaving Wrestle-1 due to his contract with the company expiring. On July 29, Tanaka, Hayashi and Tajiri lost the UWA World Trios Championship to Andy Wu, Daiki Inaba and Seiki Yoshioka in their fifth defense.

=== Pro Wrestling Noah (2017–2020) ===
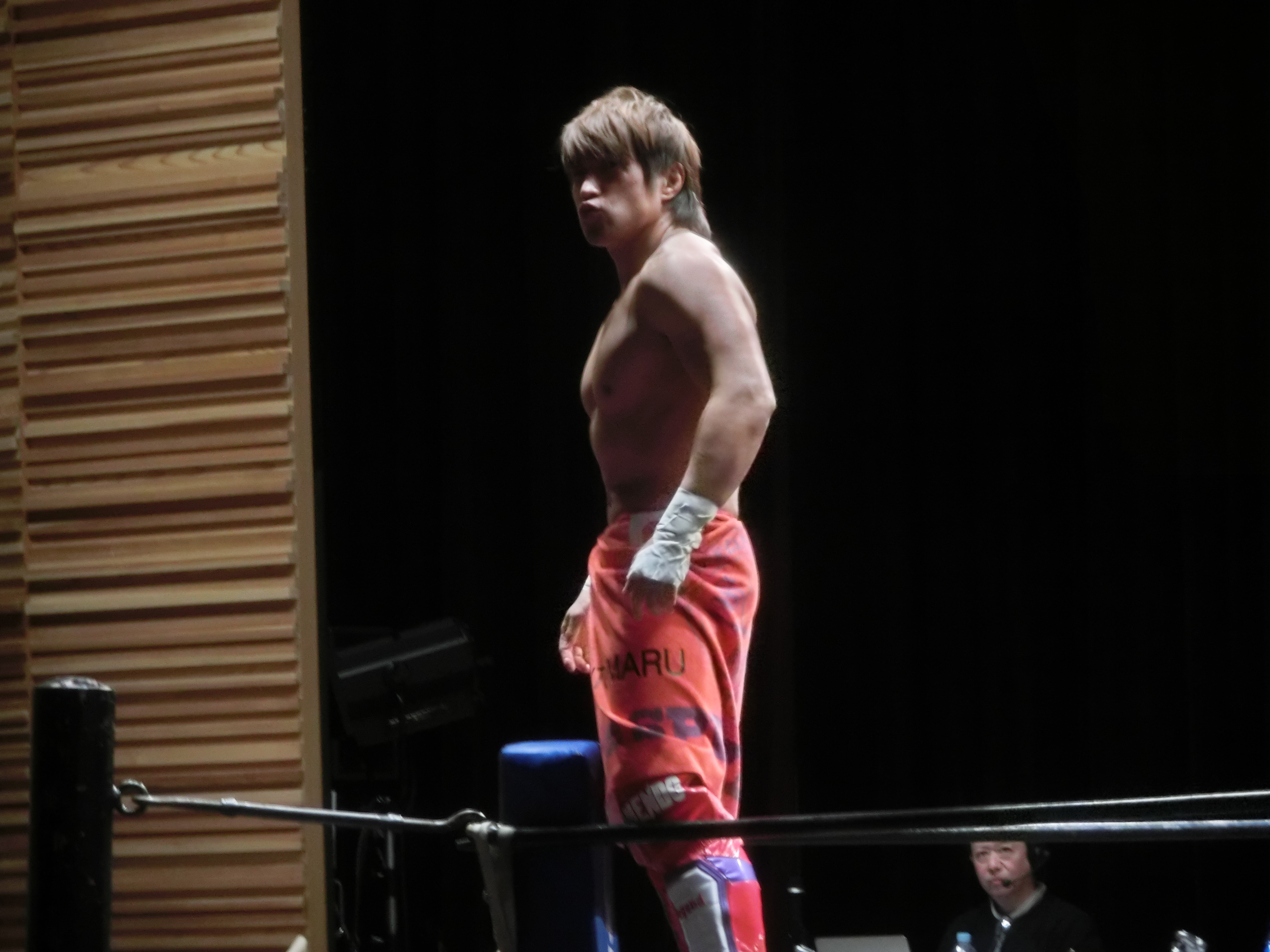
Tanaka in 2019

Tanaka made his first appearance in NOAH after 15 years on September 5, 2017, and called for a shot at the GHC Junior Heavyweight Championship, but first defeated Hitoshi Kumano on October 1. He would eventually get his shot on December 22, but was defeated by the defending champion Daisuke Harada. On March 11, 2018, he and Yoshinari Ogawa defeated XX (Hi69 and Taiji Ishimori) to win the GHC Junior Heavyweight Tag Team Championship, but, as Ishimori announced his departure the very next day, Ogawa opted to vacate the titles as he would not accept a title victory over someone focused mentally on leaving rather than focused on the match. This led to a tournament being set up to crown new champions, where Tanaka and new partner Hi69 defeated Ratel's (Hayata (wrestler) and Yo-Hey) in the finals on April 15 to regain the titles. On May 29, the two continued their battle against the stable by successfully defending the titles against Tadasuke and Daisuke Harada. On August 18, they successfully defended the titles by defeating Hayata and Yo-Hey once again. The pair continued their dominating run in a series of matches against some of Tanaka's regular career rivals – on September 2, the duo defeated Ikuto Hidaka and Takuya Sugawara from Zero1, the former of whom came up with Minoru as a rival in Battlearts. On November 25, Minoru and Hi69 won their fourth and final defense of the Junior Tag-Titles, taking on Tanaka's 20-year partner and enemy, Koji Kanemoto, and his partner Hiroshi Yamato. At Great Voyage on December 16, the duo's reign came to an end as they were defeated by The Back Breakers (Hajime Ohara and Hitoshi Kumano). On March 10, 2019, Tanaka finally defeated Harada to win the GHC Junior Heavyweight Championship and complete his wins of the top three junior heavyweight championships in Japan (New Japan's IWGP, Noah's GHC, and All Japan's PWF) as well as Zero1's and Wrestle-1's titles.

== Personal life ==
In 2002, Tanaka married former professional wrestler Yumi Fukawa soon after her retirement. The couple have two children. Their eldest daughter Kizuna is a fellow professional wrestler and has been working in Dream Star Fighting Marigold since July 2024.

== Championships and accomplishments ==
- All Japan Pro Wrestling
  - All Asia Tag Team Championship (3 times) – with Koji Kanemoto (2) and Toshizo (1)
  - Gaora TV Championship (1 time)
  - World Junior Heavyweight Championship (1 time)
  - Junior Tag League (2009) – with Toshizo
- European Wrestling Promotion
  - EWP Intercontinental Championship (2 times)
- Fujiwara Gumi / Battlarts
  - FMW World Junior Heavyweight/Independent World Junior Heavyweight Championship (2 times)
  - UWA World Middleweight Championship (1 time)
  - Japanese Junior Crown League (1999)
- Gleat
  - G-Rush Championship (1 time)
  - Lidet UWF Title Next Challenger Tournament (2023)
- New Japan Pro-Wrestling
  - IWGP Junior Heavyweight Championship (4 times)
  - IWGP Junior Heavyweight Tag Team Championship (5 times) – with Koji Kanemoto (1), Jushin Thunder Liger (1), Hirooki Goto (1) and Prince Devitt (2)
  - Best of the Super Juniors (2006)
  - G1 Junior Six Man Tag Team Tournament (2001) – with Masayuki Naruse and Masahito Kakihara
  - Junior Heavyweight Tag MVP Award (2005) with Hirooki Goto
  - Naeba Cup Tag Tournament (2003) – with Manabu Nakanishi
- Pro Wrestling Illustrated
  - Ranked No. 12 of the top 500 singles wrestlers in the PWI 500 in 2002
- Pro Wrestling Noah
  - GHC Junior Heavyweight Tag Team Championship (2 times) – with Yoshinari Ogawa (1) and Hi69 (1)
  - GHC Junior Heavyweight Championship (1 time)
- Pro Wrestling Zero1
  - International Junior Heavyweight Championship (1 time)
  - NWA International Lightweight Tag Team Championship (1 time) – with Koji Kanemoto
  - NWA World Junior Heavyweight Championship (1 time)
- Wrestle-1
  - UWA World Trios Championship (1 time) – with Kaz Hayashi and Tajiri
  - Wrestle-1 Cruiser Division Championship (1 time)
  - Wrestle-1 Cruiser Festival (2020)
- Wrestling Observer Newsletter awards
  - Best Technical Wrestler (2001)

== Mixed martial arts record ==
Professional record breakdown
2 matches	0 wins	2 losses
By knockout	0	2

Res.	Record	Opponent	Method	Event	Date	Round	Time	Location	Notes
Loss	0–2	Takuya Wada	TKO (punches and elbows)	Gleat MMA Ver.0	December 14, 2022	1	1:37	Tokyo, Japan	Openweight bout.
Loss	0–1	Sanae Kikuta	Submission (guillotine choke)	RINGS - Rings Battle Genesis II	October 14, 1997	2	3:08	Korakuen Hall Tokyo, Japan	Openweight bout.
