= Kazuhiko Masada =

Japanese professional wrestler

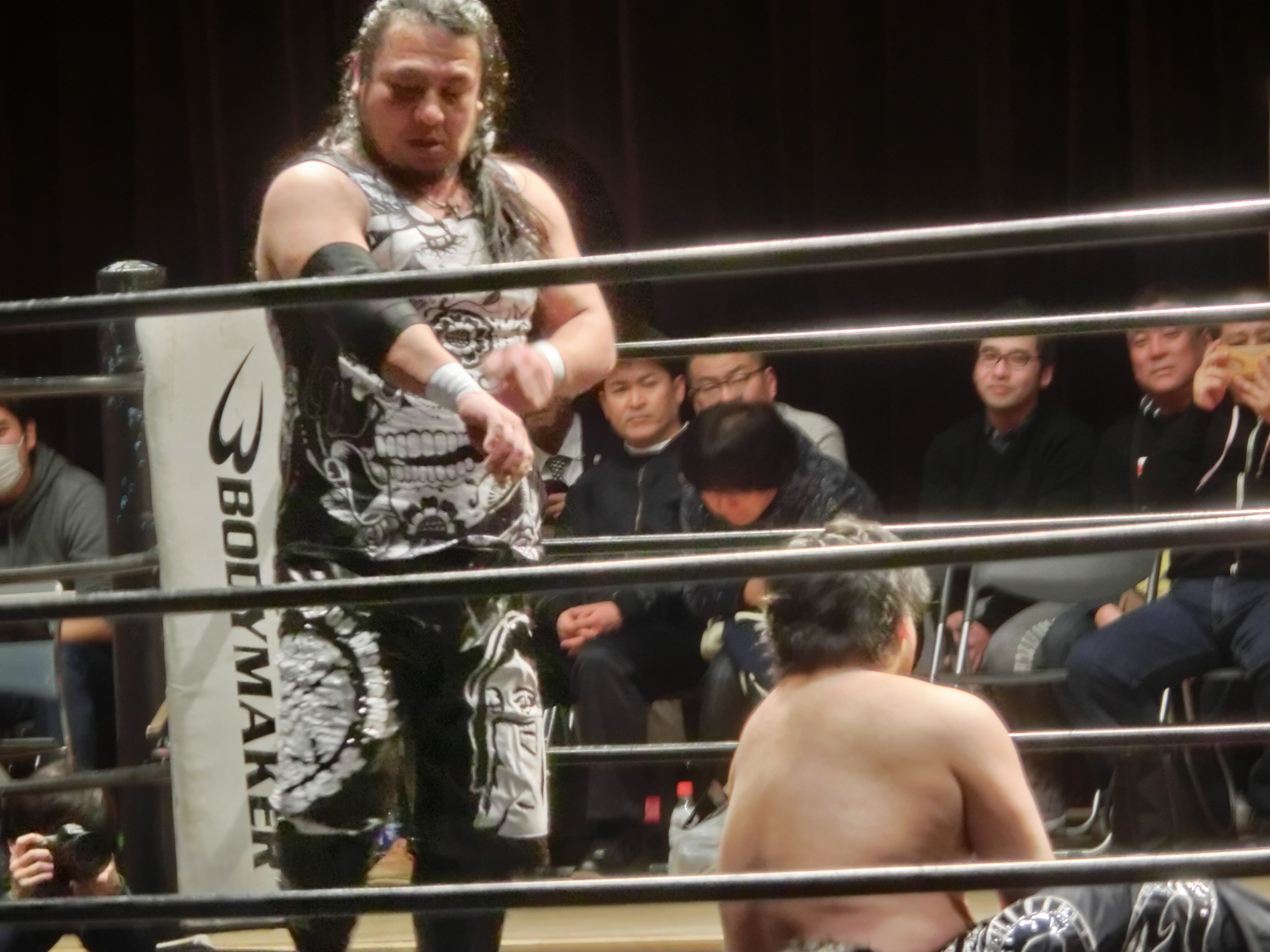
- Mazada in 2019

Personal information
- Born: May 23, 1975 (age 51) Mikuni, Fukui, Japan

Professional wrestling career
- Ring name(s): Enigma; Kazuhiko Masada; Kazuhiko Shoda; Majari; Masacaras; Mazada; Kaz Masada; Pentagón Viper; Señor Saito
- Billed height: 1.72 m (5 ft 8 in)
- Billed weight: 87 kg (192 lb)
- Trained by: Tatsumi Fujinami; Minoru Suzuki
- Debut: November 15, 1995

Kazuhiko Masada (正田 和彦, Masada Kazuhiko) (born May 23, 1975) is a Japanese professional wrestler, mostly known for his ring name Mazada (written in all capitals). He is one of the founding members of the renowned stable Tokyo Gurentai along with Nosawa Rongai and Kikuzawa.

== Championships and accomplishments ==
- All Japan Pro Wrestling
  - AJPW Junior Tag League (2006) - with Nosawa Rongai
- Apache Army
  - WEW Tag Team Championship (1 time) - with Nosawa Rongai
- Dradition Pro Wrestling
  - CAW Central United States Tag Team Championship (1 time) - with Katsushi Takemura
- Dramatic Dream Team
  - UWA World Trios Championship (2 times) - with Nosawa Rongai and Fujita
- El Dorado Wrestling
  - UWA World Tag Team Championship (1 time) - with Nosawa Rongai
- International Wrestling Revolution Group
  - IWRG Intercontinental Tag Team Championship (2 times) - with Nosawa (1) and American Gigolo (1)
  - IWRG Intercontinental Trios Championship (1 time) - with Nosawa and Takemura
  - Copa Higher Power (2004) - with Nosawa Rongai, Garuda and Black Tiger III
- Mobius
  - Apex of Triangle Six–Man Tag Team Championship (1 time) - with Nosawa Rongai and Takemura
- Pro Wrestling Illustrated
  - PWI ranked him #277 of the best 500 singles wrestlers in the PWI 500 in 2006
- Tokyo Gurentai
  - Tokyo Intercontinental Tag Team Championship (3 times) – with HUB (1) and Fujita (1), Dick Togo (1)
  - Tokyo World Heavyweight Championship (1 time)
  - Tokyo World Tag Team Championship (1 time) - with Nosawa Rongai
- Wrestle-1
  - Wrestle-1 Cruiser Division Championship (2 times)
  - UWA World Trios Championship (1 time) - with Nosawa Rongai and Fujita
