= List of Wrestle-1 personnel =

Wrestle-1 (W-1) was a Japanese professional wrestling promotion that operated from 2013 until 2020. Wrestle-1 personnel consisted of professional wrestlers, ring announcers, referees, and trainees.

== Roster at time of closure ==
=== Wrestlers ===
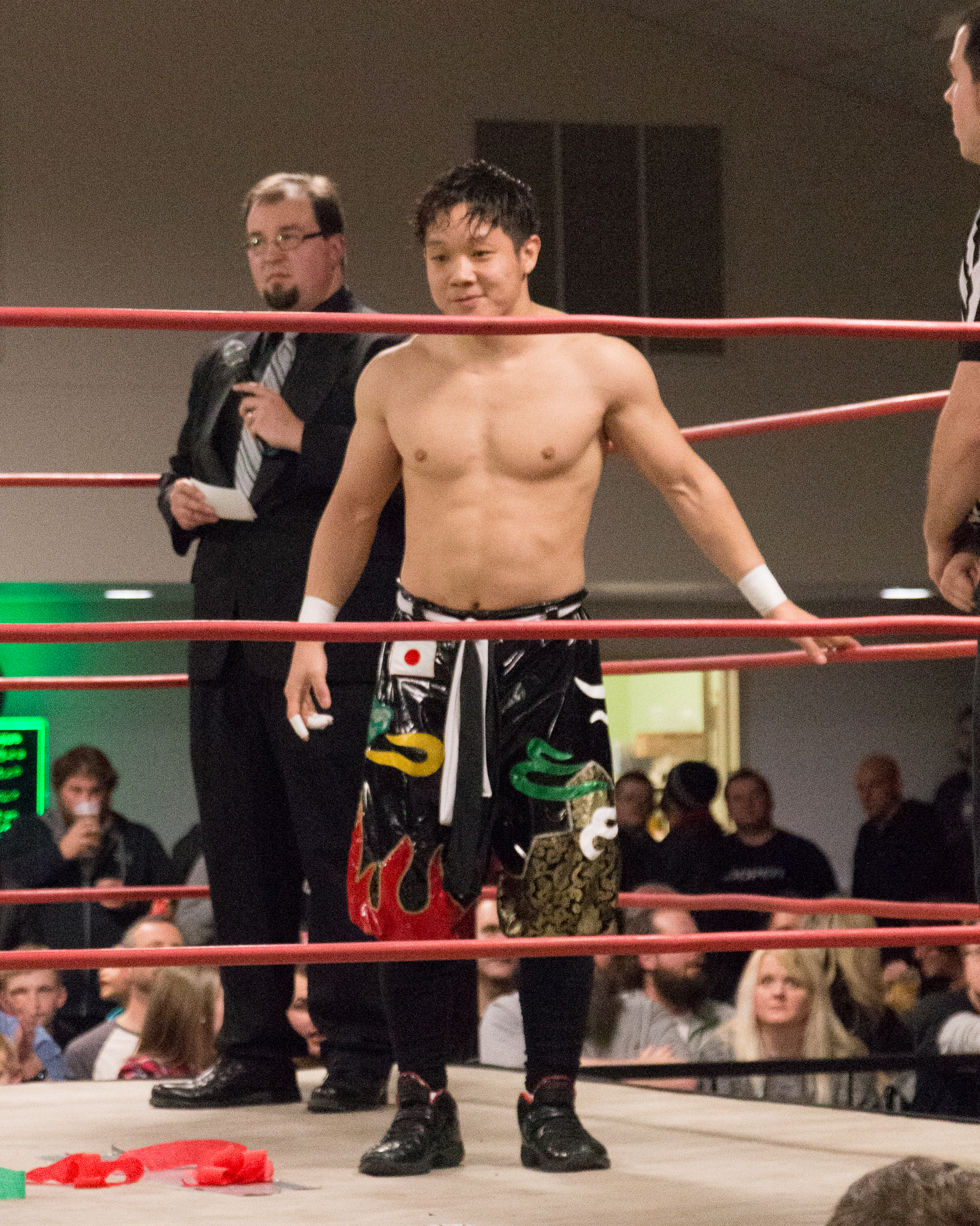
Yusuke Kodama

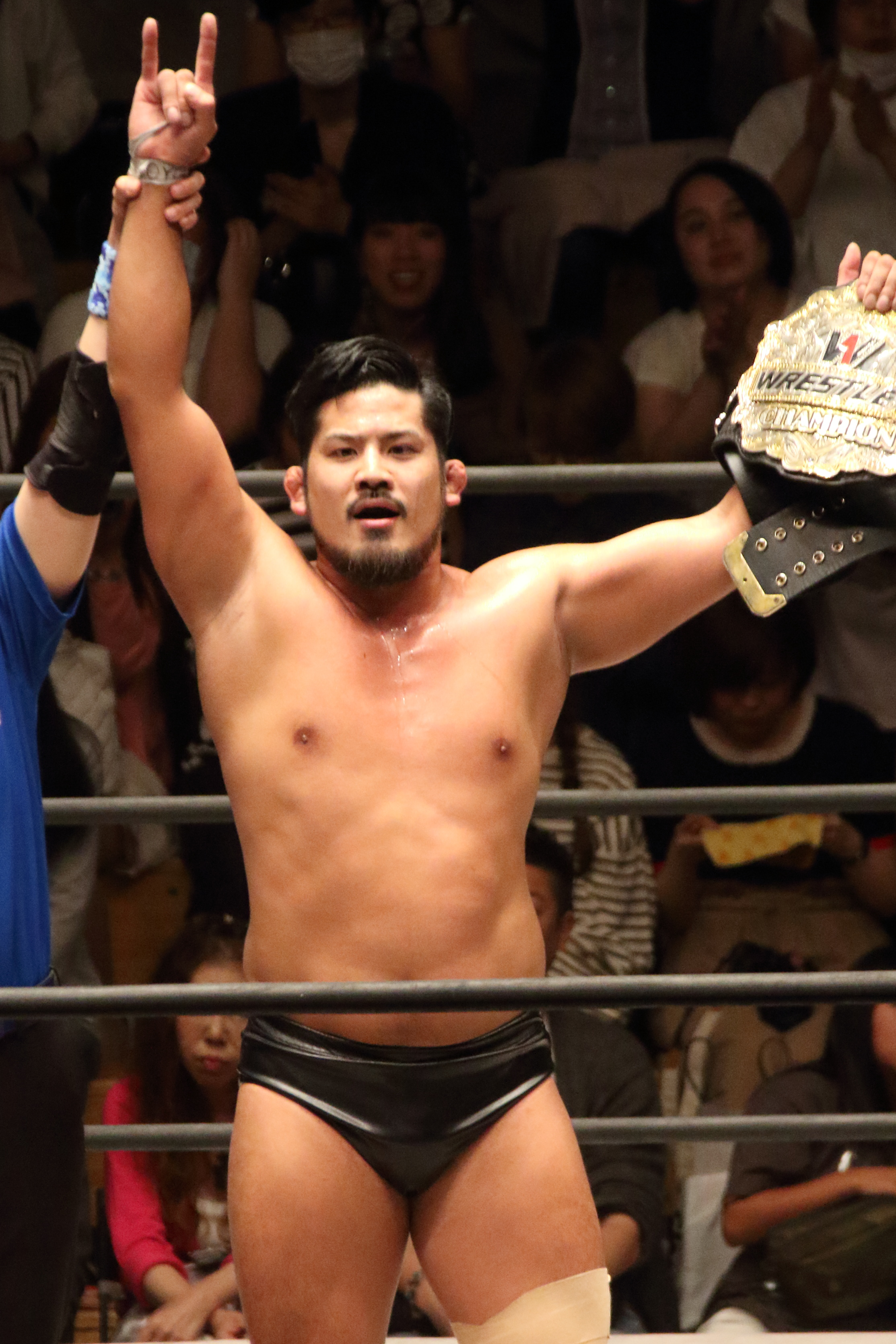
Shotaro Ashino

Ring name	Real name	Notes
Alejandro	Kohei Fujimura	
Andy Wu	Chihiro Mizuki	
Cima	Nobuhiko Oshima	President of Oriental Wrestling Entertainment
Daiki Inaba	Daiki Inaba	Final Wrestle-1 Tag Team Champion
El Hijo del Pantera	Unknown	
El Lindaman	Yuga Hayashi	Signed to Oriental Wrestling Entertainment
Hajime	Hajime Nomura	
Jun Tonsho	Jun Tonsho	
Kannazuki	Satoshi Okumura	Final F-1 Tag Team Champion
Kaz Hayashi	Kazuhiro Hayashi	Final Wrestle-1 Champion; President; Trainer
Keiji Mutoh	Keiji Mutoh	Final F-1 Tag Team Champion; Founder and representative director Also wrestled as The Great Muta
Kohei Fujimura	Kohei Fujimura	
Koji Doi	Takashi Doi	
Kuma Arashi	Masaya Suzuki	
Manabu Soya	Manabu Soya	
Masayuki Kono	Masayuki Kono	
Mazada	Kazuhiko Masada	Freelancer
René Duprée	René Goguen	
Ryuki Honda	Ryuki Honda	
Seigo Tachibana	Seigo Tachibana	
Seiki Yoshioka	Seiki Yoshioka	Final Wrestle-1 Cruiser Division Champion
Shotaro Ashino	Shotaro Ashino	
Shuji Kondo	Shuji Kondo	Executive vice president Booker; Trainer
T-Hawk	Takuya Onodera	Signed to Oriental Wrestling Entertainment
Takumi Baba	Takumi Baba	
Takehiro Yamamura	Takehiro Yamamura	Signed to Oriental Wrestling Entertainment
Takanori Ito	Takanori Ito	
Yushi Takahashi	Yushi Takahashi	
Yusuke Kodama	Yusuke Kodama	

=== Trainees ===
Name	Notes
Marco Antonio Yamamoto	Began training in April 2015
Mizuki Higuchi	Began training in April 2015
Tomoki Ichihara	Began training in April 2015
Tomoya Ebina	Began training in April 2014

=== Staff ===
Name	Notes
Daichi Murayama	Referee
Daisuke Kanbayashi	Referee
Hiroki Kuwabara	Conditioning coach
Takanori Ishigame	Ring announcer

== Notable alumni ==
=== Men ===
- Bob Sapp
- Masakatsu Funaki
- Masato Tanaka
- Minoru Tanaka
- Nosawa Rongai
- Jay Bradley
- Jiro Kuroshio
- Kai
- Kaji Tomato
- Rob Terry
- Ryota Hama
- Seiya Sanada
- Shoki Kitamura
- Shu Asakawa
- Taiyō Kea
- Tajiri
- Takuro Niki
- Zodiac

=== Joshi talent ===
- Hana Kimura
- Hanako Nakamori
- Mika Iwata
- Nao Kakuta
- Natsumi Maki
- Sachie Abe
- Saori Anou
