= Koriki Choshu =

Japanese comedian

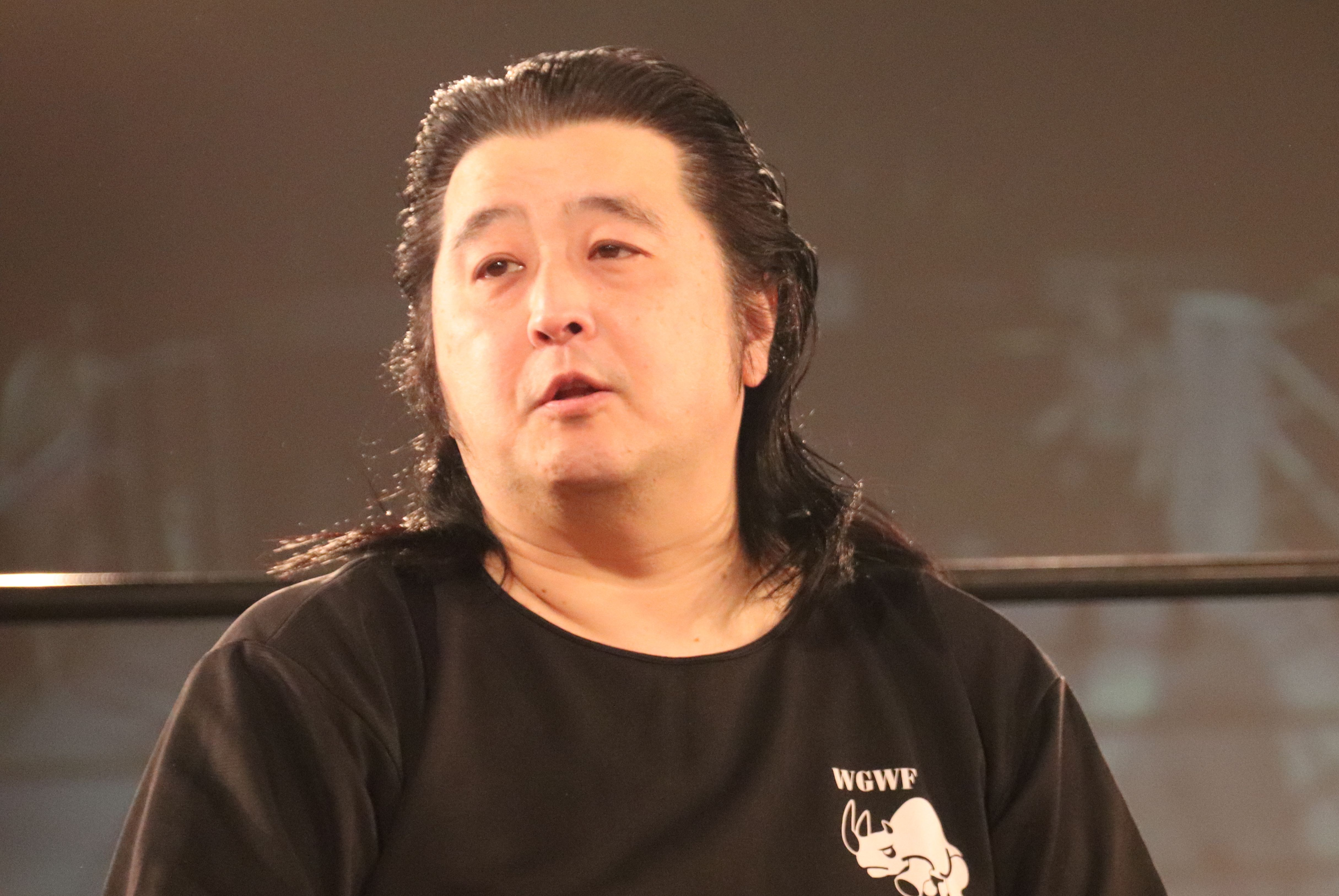
Koriki Choshu (February 2023)

Koriki Choshu (長州小力, Chōshū Koriki) (born Kazuteru Kubota (久保田和輝, Kubota Kazuteru), February 5, 1972 in the city of Nishi-Tokyo, Tokyo) is a Japanese comedian. He is most famous for his act in which he mocks a famous Japanese professional wrestler Riki Choshu due to his resemblance. Koriki is a wordplay on Riki's name, meaning something like "little Riki".

Unlike many Japanese comedians, he is not associated with any entertainment agency, though he belongs to a comedian "pro-wrestling" organization, West Gate Wrestling Federation (西口プロレス, Nishiguchi Puroresu).

On television, he is always seen wearing the same outfit, short bicycle shorts and a far too short T-shirt showing off his protruding belly. He speaks with a very strong lisp (much less so when not in character) and is prone to treating mundane objects (such as his microphone) as wrestling opponents.

More recently, he has added Para Para (a Japanese dancing style) to his comedy routine, always to the tune of "Night of Fire", a popular Eurobeat track by Bratt Sinclaire. In 2005, riding the popularity of his act, Koriki was featured in a cover version of Niko's track with Para Para oriented Japanese idol group Hinoi Team, accompanying a video and CD release.

He also tried to work with a partner who was looking like Antonio Inoki, aptly named Antonio Koinoki, but the gimmick failed and his partner faded into obscurity.

He has also performed as a competitor on Sasuke, having entered five tournaments (15th, 18th, 19th, 20th, 24th), but has never made it past the First Stage. Only in the 18th tournament did he ever manage to clear the first obstacle.

In the anime School Rumble, Choshu made a cameo appearance in episode 17 doing the Para Para dance with Tsukamoto Tenma who is trying to scare away Harima Kenji.

On December 12, 2010, Choshu made an appearance for All Japan Pro Wrestling and teamed with Ryota Hama in a match, where they defeated Keiji Mutoh and comedian Kannazuki to win the F–1 (Fake–1 Gran Prix) Tag Team Championship. The title is not officially recognized by the promotion. Their team lost this parodic title to Manabu Soya and RG on December 11, 2011.

== Championships ==
  - F-1 Tag Team Championship (1 time) – with Ryota Hama
  - Current Shinshu Wrestling Federation Tag Champion (1 time) – with Antonio Koinoki

Note: this championship not officially recognized by All Japan Pro Wrestling.
