= Razor Ramon (disambiguation) =

Razor Ramon (Scott Hall, 1958–2022) was an American professional wrestler.

Razor Ramon may also refer to:

- Rick Bognar (1970–2019), Canadian wrestler, portrayed Hall's "Razor Ramon" gimmick for a short-lived 1996 revival; also known as "Fake Razor Ramon"
- Masaki Sumitani (born 1975), Japanese comedian and wrestler, who performed under the name Razor Ramon HG (a.k.a. Razor Ramon Hard Gay)
- Makoto Izubuchi (born 1974), Japanese comedian and wrestler, who performed under the name Razor Ramon RG (a.k.a. Razor Ramon Real Gay)
