= Kannazuki (disambiguation) =

Kannazuki (神無月) is the tenth month of the Japanese calendar.

Kannazuki may also refer to:

- Kannazuki (comedian) (born 1965), Japanese comedian
- Kannazuki no Miko, a Japanese manga series
