= WWE Hall of Fame (2023) =

Professional wrestling induction event

- Promotion: WWE
- Date: March 31, 2023
- City: Los Angeles, California
- Venue: Crypto.com Arena

WWE Hall of Fame chronology
← Previous; 2022	Next → 2024

The 2023 WWE Hall of Fame was a professional wrestling event produced by WWE that featured the induction of the 24th class into the WWE Hall of Fame. The ceremony took place on March 31, 2023, at Crypto.com Arena in Los Angeles, California, the night preceding WrestleMania 39. It aired live at 10pm Eastern Time on Peacock in the United States and the WWE Network internationally, immediately after the airing of WWE's regular Friday night program, SmackDown.

== Background ==
On March 10, 2023, Rey Mysterio was announced as the first individual inductee for the WWE Hall of Fame Class of 2023. On March 15, 2023, The Great Muta was announced as the second individual inductee for the WWE Hall of Fame Class of 2023 by Ric Flair. On March 20, 2023, Andy Kaufman, known for his feud with Jerry "The King" Lawler, was announced as the third inductee. On March 27, 2023, Stacy Keibler was announced as the fourth inductee. On March 29, 2023, Tim White was announced to receive the Warrior Award. which, for the second time since the 2019 ceremony, Dana Warrior did not present the award. This would also the final time that the award would be presented due to Warrior being released later that year and the award being discontinued thereafter.

For the second year in a row, there were no Legacy Wing inductees.

== Inductees ==
=== Individual ===
- Class headliners appear in **boldface**

Image	Ring name (Birth name)	Inducted by	WWE recognized accolades
	**Rey Mysterio** (Óscar Gutiérrez)	Konnan	One-time WWE Champion; Two-time World Heavyweight Champion; Two-time WWE Intercontinental Champion; Three-time WWE United States Champion; Eight-time WCW/WWE Cruiserweight Champion; Four-time WWE Tag Team Champion; One-time WWE SmackDown Tag Team Champion; Three-time WCW World Tag Team Champion; One-time WCW Cruiserweight Tag Team Champion; 2006 Royal Rumble winner. In 2023 Mysterio won his third WWE United States Championship.
	The Great Muta (Keiji Muto)	Ric Flair	Four-time IWGP Heavyweight Champion; Three-time Triple Crown Heavyweight Champion; One-time GHC Heavyweight Champion; One-time NWA Worlds Heavyweight Champion; One-time WCW World Television Champion; One-time WCW World Tag Team Champion; 1992 BattleBowl winner Popularized or innovated moves such as the Shining Wizard, Moonsault, Muta Lock, and Asian Mist.
	Stacy Keibler (Stacy Ann-Marie Keibler)	Mick Foley and Torrie Wilson	Nitro Girl Search winner (1999); WWE Babe of the Year (2004); Manager/valet for numerous wrestlers in WCW and WWE.

=== Celebrity ===
Image	Recipient (Birth name)	Inducted by	Notes
	Andy Kaufman (Andrew Geoffrey Kaufman)	Jerry Lawler and Jimmy Hart	Posthumous inductee: Represented by his brother Michael, his sister Carol, his niece Maria, and his daughter Brittany. A comedian and actor who rose to fame in the late 1970s and early 1980s as a star of the TV series Taxi, Kaufman became involved in wrestling by promoting himself as the "Inter-Gender Wrestling Champion of the World", where he would wrestle against women. This would lead to a feud with Jerry Lawler in the Continental Wrestling Association (CWA). As part of the feud, Lawler famously slapped Kaufman in the face during an interview on Late Night with David Letterman. Considered by WWE as one of the first celebrities to cross over into wrestling.

=== Warrior Award ===
Recipient (Birth name)	Inducted by	Notes
Tim White (Timothy Rhys White)	John "Bradshaw" Layfield and Ron Simmons	Posthumous recipient: Represented by his brothers, Tom and Pat. Former referee and producer for WWE, backstage assistant for André the Giant.
