= F-1 Tag Team Championship =

Japanese sporting competition

Details
- Promotion: All Japan Pro Wrestling (2006–2013); Wrestle-1 (2015–2020)
- Date established: December 2006

Other names
- F-1 Tag Team Championship (F-1タッグ王座, F-1 Taggu Ōza)
Statistics
- First champions: Keiji Muto and Kannazuki
- Final champions: Keiji Muto and Kannazuki
- Longest reign: Keiji Muto and Kannazuki (second reign, {1,636 days)
- Shortest reign: Kannazuki and Takao Omori (first reign, 137 days)

The F-1 Tag Team Championship (F-1タッグチャンピオンシップ, F-1 Taggu Chanpionshippu) was a title owned and promoted by the Wrestle-1 promotion. The title was originally created in 2006 in All Japan Pro Wrestling (AJPW), with the inaugural champions crowned on December 15, 2006. The "F" in F-1 stands for "fake". In Japanese the title's name includes the katakana term for "championship", Chanpionshippu (チャンピオンシップ), derived from the English language instead of the more common kanji term Ōza (王座) that was used in the name of the title when it was still owned by AJPW.

Being a professional wrestling championship, the title is won as a result of a match with a predetermined outcome. The last champions were Keiji Muto and Kannazuki.

== History ==
The F-1 Tag Team Championship was an unofficial tag team title in All Japan Pro Wrestling (AJPW) that was not recognized by the promotion. It was more of a comedy title as matches were a mix of regular wrestling and impromptu standup comedy routines involving the wrestlers. It was created by Keiji Muto in December 2006, and he and comedian Kannazuki were the first to win the titles.

In May 2013, 11 wrestlers including Keiji Muto left AJPW, and established a new promotion, Wrestle-1. With the departure of its creator, the F-1 Tag Team Championship was abandoned.

On August 30, 2015 it was announced that the title was going to be revived and new champions would be crowned on October 9. At Wrestle-1 Tour 2015 Fan Appreciation Day, Muto and Kannazuki reunited to defeat Manabu Soya and Sugi-chan to win the titles for their second time, starting their first reign as the F-1 Tag Team Champions in Wrestle-1; however they never defended the title as Kannazuki stopped wrestling thereafter.

On February 29, 2020, Wrestle-1 announced that they would be closing down following their final event on April 1, thus deactivating all championship titles.

== Reigns ==
Key
No.	Overall reign number
Reign	Reign number for the specific team—reign numbers for the individuals are in parentheses, if different
Days	Number of days held
Defenses	Number of successful defenses

No.	Champion	Championship change			Reign statistics			Notes	Ref.
No.	Champion	Date	Event	Location	Reign	Days	Defenses	Notes	Ref.
All Japan Pro Wrestling (AJPW)
1	Keiji Muto and Kannazuki	December 15, 2006	Fan Appreciation Day 2006	Tokyo, Japan	1	1,458	8	Defeated Hiroyoshi Tenzan and Akimasa Haraguchi to become the inaugural champions.	
2	Ryota Hama and Koriki Choshu	December 12, 2010	Fan Appreciation Day 2010	Tokyo, Japan	1	364	0		
3	Manabu Soya and RG	December 11, 2011	Fan Appreciation Day 2011	Tokyo, Japan	1	370	0		
4	Kannazuki and Takao Omori	December 15, 2012	Fan Appreciation Day 2012	Morioka, Japan	1 (2, 1)	137	0		
—	Deactivated	May 1, 2013	—	—	—	—	—	All Japan Pro Wrestling abandoned the title.	
Wrestle-1 (W-1)
5	Keiji Muto and Kannazuki	October 9, 2015	Wrestle-1 Tour 2015 Fan Appreciation Day	Tokyo, Japan	2 (2, 3)	1,636	0	Defeated Manabu Soya and Sugi-chan, after the title was revived by Wrestle-1. Wrestle-1, however, considered this a new title and dubbed Keiji Muto and Kannazuki as the first champions.	
—	Deactivated	April 1, 2020	—	—	—	—	—	Title retired when Wrestle-1 closed.	

=== By team ===
Rank (Note: Each reign is ranked highest to lowest; reigns with the same number mean that they are tied for that certain rank.)	Team	No. of reigns	Combined defenses	Combined days
1	Keiji Muto and Kannazuki	2	8	3,094
2	Manabu Soya and RG	1	0	370
3	Ryota Hama and Koriki Choshu	1	0	364
4	Kannazuki and Takao Omori	1	0	137

=== By wrestler ===
Rank	Wrestler	No. of reigns	Combined defenses	Combined days
1	Kannazuki	3	8	3,231
2	Keiji Muto	2	8	3,094
3	RG	1	0	370
3	Manabu Soya	1	0	370
5	Koriki Choshu	1	0	364
5	Ryota Hama	1	0	364
7	Takao Omori	1	0	137
