= Masaki Sumitani =

Japanese comedian, professional wrestler and tarento

- 住谷正樹
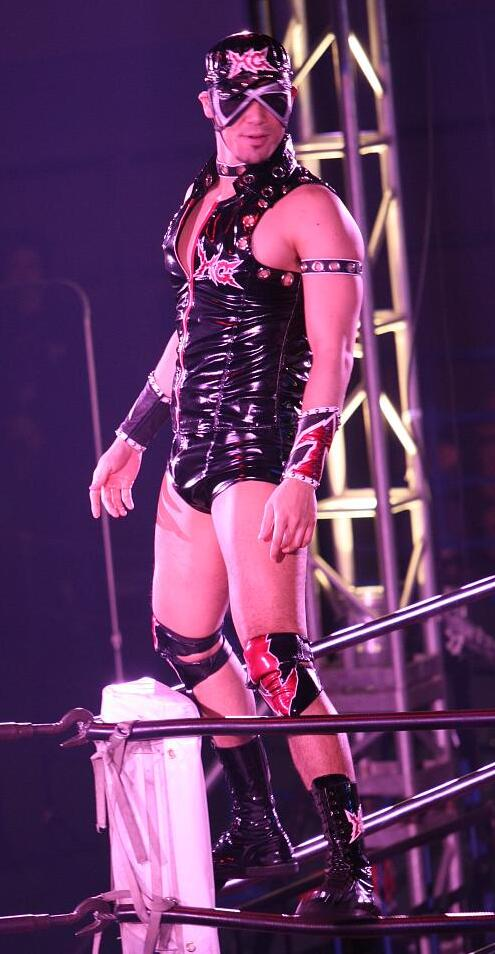
- Sumitani as Hard Gay in 2008
- Born: December 18, 1975 (age 50); Harima, Hyōgo, Japan
- Other name: Razor Ramon HG
- Occupations: Comedian, Wrestler
- Professional wrestling career
- Ring names: HG; Monster HG; Super HG
- Billed height: 1.85 m (6 ft 1 in)
- Billed weight: 88 kg (194 lb)
- Billed from: Harima, Hyōgo
- Debut: November 3, 2005
- Retired: April 5, 2010

Masaki Sumitani (住谷 正樹, Sumitani Masaki; born December 18, 1975) a Japanese comedian, television personality, and retired professional wrestler. He is best known for creating and portraying Razor Ramon HG (レイザーラモンHG, Reizā Ramon Eichi Jī; also known as Hard Gay), (Note: Occasionally also known as HG, Super HG or Monster HG. In 2019, Masaki changed the "HG" acronym from "Hard Gay" to "Hot Guy".) a satirical fictional character who became known through appearances on the Japanese variety show Bakusho Mondai no Bakuten!

== Early life ==
Masaki Sumitani was born December 18, 1975, in Harima, Hyōgo Prefecture, Japan. After graduating from Hyogo Prefectural Kakogawa Higashi High School, he entered Doshisha University and majored in commerce.

== Professional wrestling career ==
While at college he picked up wrestling as a hobby and soon joined the Doshisha Professional Wrestling Alliance (DWA). Under his performing name "GiveUp Sumitani", he won the heavy class Kyoto pro-wrestling championship co-hosted by DWA and the Ritsumeikan Wrestling Alliance (RWA) of nearby Ritsumeikan University in Kyoto. Former IWGP Champion Hiroshi Tanahashi and fellow comedian Makoto Izubuchi were also participants of these events.

Sumitani continued his pro-wrestling aspirations in late 2005, working in the comedically off-beat Hustle promotion and defeating Yinling the Erotic Terrorist in his debut match; he has since gone to a team with Naoya Ogawa and Yoshihiro Tajiri in leading the Hustle Army against Generalissimo Takada's Monster Army.

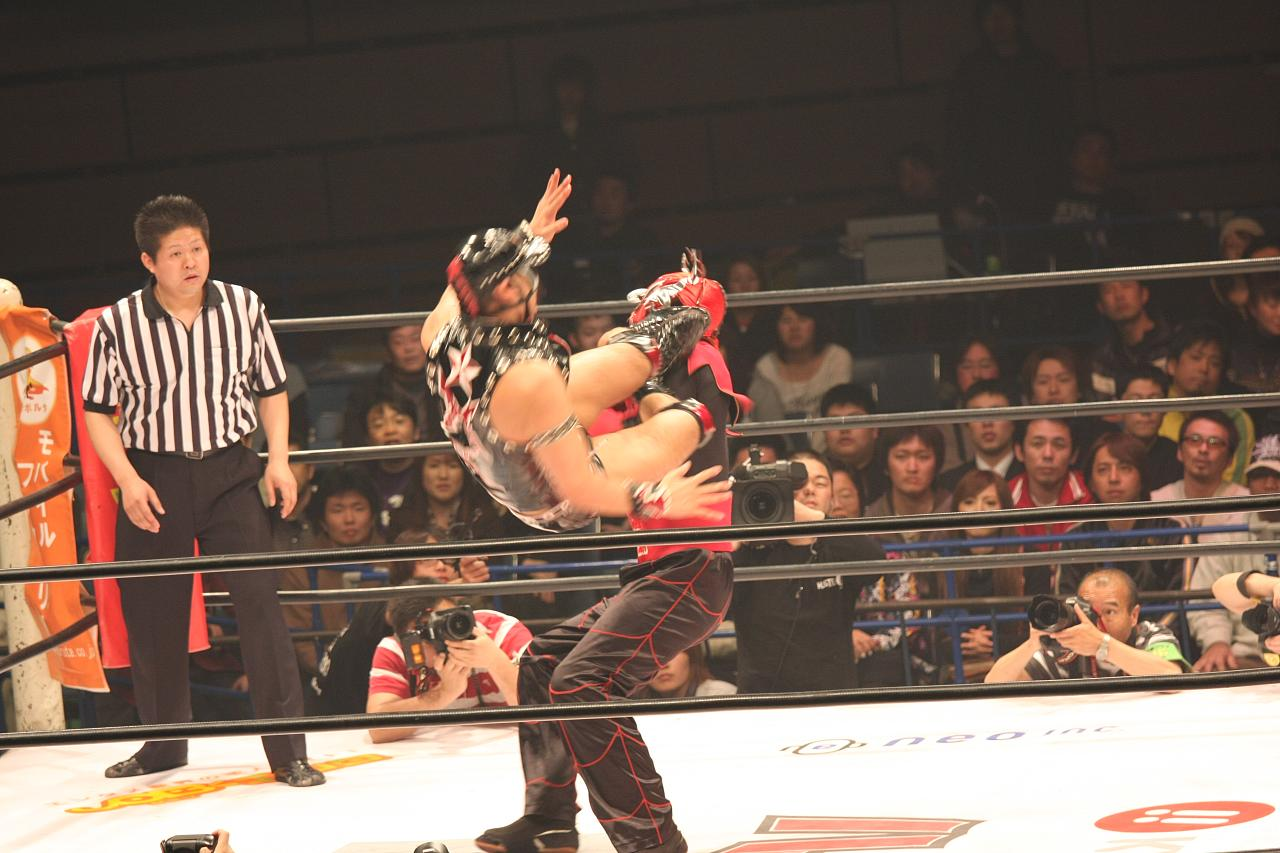
HG wrestling Onigumo at Hustle 30, in 2008

In early 2006, he started working with manzai partner Izubuchi again, with Izubuchi taking the name Razor Ramon RG ("RG" meaning "Real Gay"). Izubuchi's character was not nearly as well-received as Sumitani's but was an active pro-wrestler in Hustle, even teaming up with The Great Muta. Sumitani's character was that of an underdog face that had a never say die attitude and used his quickness to defeat his larger opponents. Daily Sports in Japan reported that Razor Ramon HG retired from pro-wrestling after Hustle Mania, which took place November 23, 2006, at Yokohama Arena with Sumitani being defeated by The Esperanza. However, as with most retirements in pro-wrestling, Sumitani returned to action, pro-wrestling at Hustle 21 on March 18 and Hustle 22 on April 21.

Hard Gay rose up to become one of the top faces of the Hustle promotion, but his pro-wrestling career came to an abrupt end in July 2009 when he shattered his left foot while diving from the ring during an event at Korakuen Hall. He needed 12 bolts to put his foot back together. Upon his recovery, he hoped to return to TV comedy.

In 2019, Hard Gay made his pro-wrestling return being defeated by Super Delfin in a three-way match.

== Comedy ==
It was through pro-wrestling in their college years, that Sumitani met Makoto Izubuchi, with whom he would later form the comedy duo "Razor Ramon", the name inspired by the character portrayed by professional wrestler Scott Hall, which debuted in the World Wrestling Federation (now WWE) in 1992. During their college years, Razor Ramon won the Fukuwarai award in the Imamiya Kids' Ebisu Manzai Contest and gained experience on the stage through the audition live performance SABUKI at 2chome-gekijo, an Osaka comedy club opened by the Yoshimoto Kogyo comedy troupe at which many comedians from the Kansai area start their career.

After completing his degree at the prestigious Doshisha University, Sumitani got a job at Co-Op Kobe, as a grocery delivery man. His desire to pursue a career as a professional comedian led him to quit his job after four months, when he joined Yoshimoto Kogyo with his partner Makoto Izubuchi. Razor Ramon made their TV debut in 1999 and won the Judges Special Award in the ABC Owarai (Comedy) Grand-Prix in 2000. Both Sumitani and Izubuchi joined the Yoshimoto Kogyo-produced program Yoshimoto Shin-kigeki in 2001, often playing yakuza, salaryman, udon restaurant owners, construction workers, and others.

=== Hard Gay ===
A character (introduced in 2002) developed and portrayed by Sumitani is Hard Gay (ハードゲイ, Hādo Gei). The term "Hādo Gei" is a Japanese reference to American gay subculture in similar fashion to "punk". In Japan, gender subculture with distinct dress style is referred to as "Gei" (ゲイ). In turn, the term "hard gay" became the reference to more masculine oriented "drag" seen to be prevalent in America. The fact that Hard Gay does not portray any Japanese gay subculture also explains why the sketch was allowed to be aired on Japanese TV, which has its own code of political correctness.

The official name is Razor Ramon HG. Dressing in a tight black PVC gay fetish outfit, he performed acts of charity (yonaoshi, “social improvement”) for unsuspecting bystanders while performing trademark pelvic thrusts and vocalizations, often accompanied by "Livin' la Vida Loca" by Ricky Martin.

According to some accounts, the name "Hard Gay" was the suggestion of Sumitani's senior comedian in the Yoshimoto Kogyo group, Kendo Kobayashi, in reference to his hard dancing. The name has also been described as a pun on 芸, gei, which means "skill" or "art". However, to develop his character, Sumitani visited gay bars in Doyama-cho, Osaka's biggest gay area, and his costume, which consists of hot pants, a small vest, and cap, all in black PVC, along with aviator sunglasses, was purchased at a shop called VFTQ in Minami-Horie, Osaka, which specializes in gay fashion. Hard Gay makes regular use of a number of catchphrases in his act; he usually makes his entrance in front of the camera shouting "Dōmō Haadogei desu" ("Hello, it's Hard Gay"), with arms thrust out and a spin afterwards. His self-introduction is then followed by his dance moves. He often shouts "Hoooooo!" (フゥ～!) or "Foohhhh!" (フォー！), a running joke in his performances. He often stops people saying unfavorable things to him by shouting "Sei sei sei sei sei" with his palm in front of the person's face. Whether this means anything is debatable, although Sumitani has commented that "sei sei" is something that comes out from his mouth when he is not happy, and that he does not mean "say" as in to speak something, although one might compare this action to the "talk to the hand" gesture. A possible interpretation might be that the origin lies in the word urusai (lit. "noisy", meaning "Be quiet!"), which is often pronounced urusē (うるせー) in Kansai dialect, shortened to sei. Another theory is the word sei written by kanji 静, meaning "quiet".

Sumitani's supposed homosexuality was exposed as a gimmick when he was caught in the midst of a date with Japanese actress and swimsuit model Anna Suzuki, whom he has since married. He has been criticised for his stereotypical depiction of gay men and for building a career on using bizarre and extreme antics to "parody" a social minority. A spokesperson for the Hokkaido Sexual Minority Association Sapporo Meeting, a support group for gay, lesbian and transgender people, has said: "Hard Gay's acceptance by the Japanese public shows me that there is a strong tendency here to see homosexuality as something to be laughed at. That is sad."

He then announced that he would start to reappear on television as Masaki Sumitani instead of Razor Ramon HG. His first reappearance as Masaki Sumitani was April 18, 2008, in a theatrical production of the jidaigeki take, Hakana.

Prior to his transition back to television comedy, Sumitani revealed that during his hiatus between his career-ending wrestling injury and his impending TV return that he has fallen on hard times and has been making the equivalent of US$70 a month. He is planning to reinvent himself because he does not want to go down in Japanese television history as a "one-hit wonder". Whether this entails a new neta (comic hook) for his HG character or a brand new character altogether for Sumitani remains to be seen.

Sumitani once reprised his role as Hard Gay for a teaser for the video game Devil's Third. Unlike his early appearances, he wears a suit but retains his signature cap and glasses.

== Other media ==
Razor Ramon HG made a small cameo in the May 2006 chapter of Gantz (chapter 233), shown on television in Kurono Kei's apartment. He also made a small cameo in episode 12 of The Melancholy of Haruhi Suzumiya, at 2:29, with Akihiro Miwa. A picture of him is shown in Ğ. In addition, a reference to Razor Ramon HG is made in Chapter 2 of the manga "Asu no Yoichi", with a character attempting to silence someone much like HG would with "Sei!"

Sumitani released his first single entitled "Young Man" on 8 February 2006; it is a Japanese rendition of the Village People's song "YMCA".

He has also appeared in several television programs. HG (as himself) portrayed a gym teacher in the high school episode of the batsu game series from the Japanese variety show Gaki no Tsukai. He also did a cameo on the set of Hana Yori Dango. Razor Ramon was a contestant on Viking: The Ultimate Obstacle Course, even making it to the final and finished in 2nd place. He was featured on The Soup's "Souper Fantastic Ultra Wish Time". He was featured on Lost in Tokyo, a Dutch and Flemish game show. He has also appeared in multiple episodes of Jonathan Ross' Japanorama on the BBC. In May 2009, he made an appearance in the comical Drama, Atashinchi no Danshi, where his character was in love with one of the male characters named Fuu. There were repeated shoots of his catchphrase "Fuuuu!" while he walked around the family house in search of Fuu. In 2016, Sumitani appeared in Gantz: O, voice acting as the character George Shimaki.

Hard Gay, dressed differently, makes a cameo as a construction worker in the game Freshly-Picked Tingle's Rosy Rupeeland. After he fixes one of the bridges for Tingle, he proceeds to do his trademark pelvic thrusts while a smooth jazz-style song plays in the background.

Once again dressed in his wrestling outfit, Sumitani makes a cameo as Hard Gay in the 2016 Netflix drama Hibana: Spark. In this appearance, he takes part in the same comedy television show as the main character.

Seeking to shed his former image and strike out on his own, he turned to modelling. He is now the male face for boots retailer Luan.

== Personal life ==
Sumitani married actress and television personality Anna Suzuki on November 27, 2006, only four days after his initial retirement. Suzuki ended her modelling career after her commitments were finished and concentrated on starting a family. The couple had their first child in 2008.

== Championships and accomplishments ==
- Pro-Wrestling Illustrated
  - Ranked No. 129 of the top 500 singles wrestlers in the PWI 500 in 2006
- Tokyo Sports
  - Newcomer Award (2006)

== Filmography ==
- Uchu Sentai Kyuranger the Movie: Geth Indaver Strikes Back (2017) – Ommo Indaver
- Straight to Hell (2026) – Himself
