= Ryota Hama =

Japanese professional wrestler

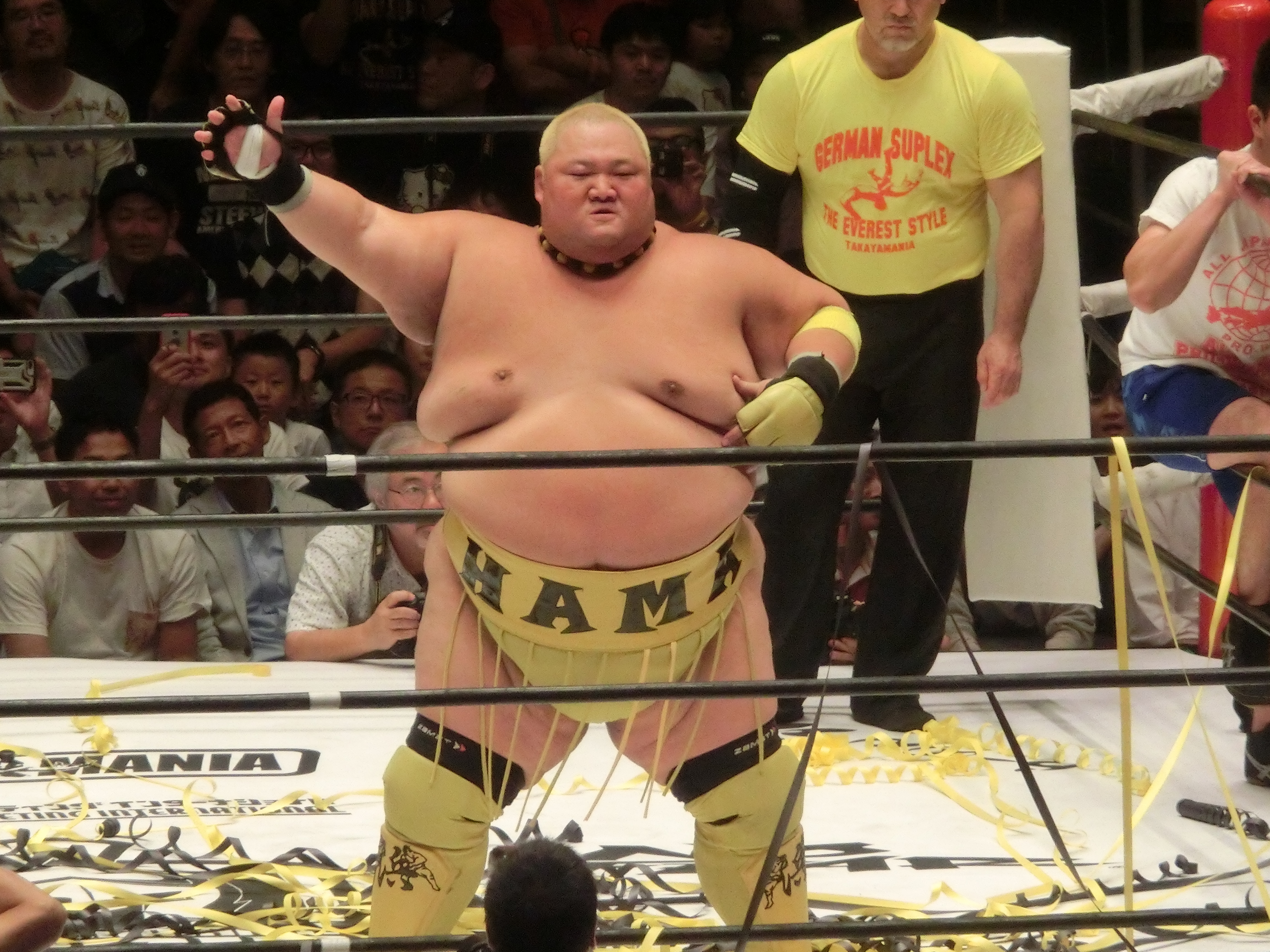
- Hama in 2018.

Personal information
- Born: November 21, 1979 (age 46) Ibaraki, Osaka, Japan

Professional wrestling career
- Ring name(s): Big Sushi; Captain All Japan; Mad Paulie; Ryota Hama; S1 Mask; Yapper Man #4
- Billed height: 1.75 m (5 ft 9 in)
- Billed weight: 226 kg (498 lb)
- Trained by: Kaz Hayashi; Kohei Suwama
- Debut: November 3, 2008

Ryota Hama (濱 亮太, Hama Ryōta; ring name: 浜 亮太) (born November 21, 1979) is a retired Japanese sumo wrestler and current professional wrestler, signed to Big Japan Pro Wrestling (BJW) in the Strong BJ division.

== Sumo career ==
Hokutoarashi Ryōta
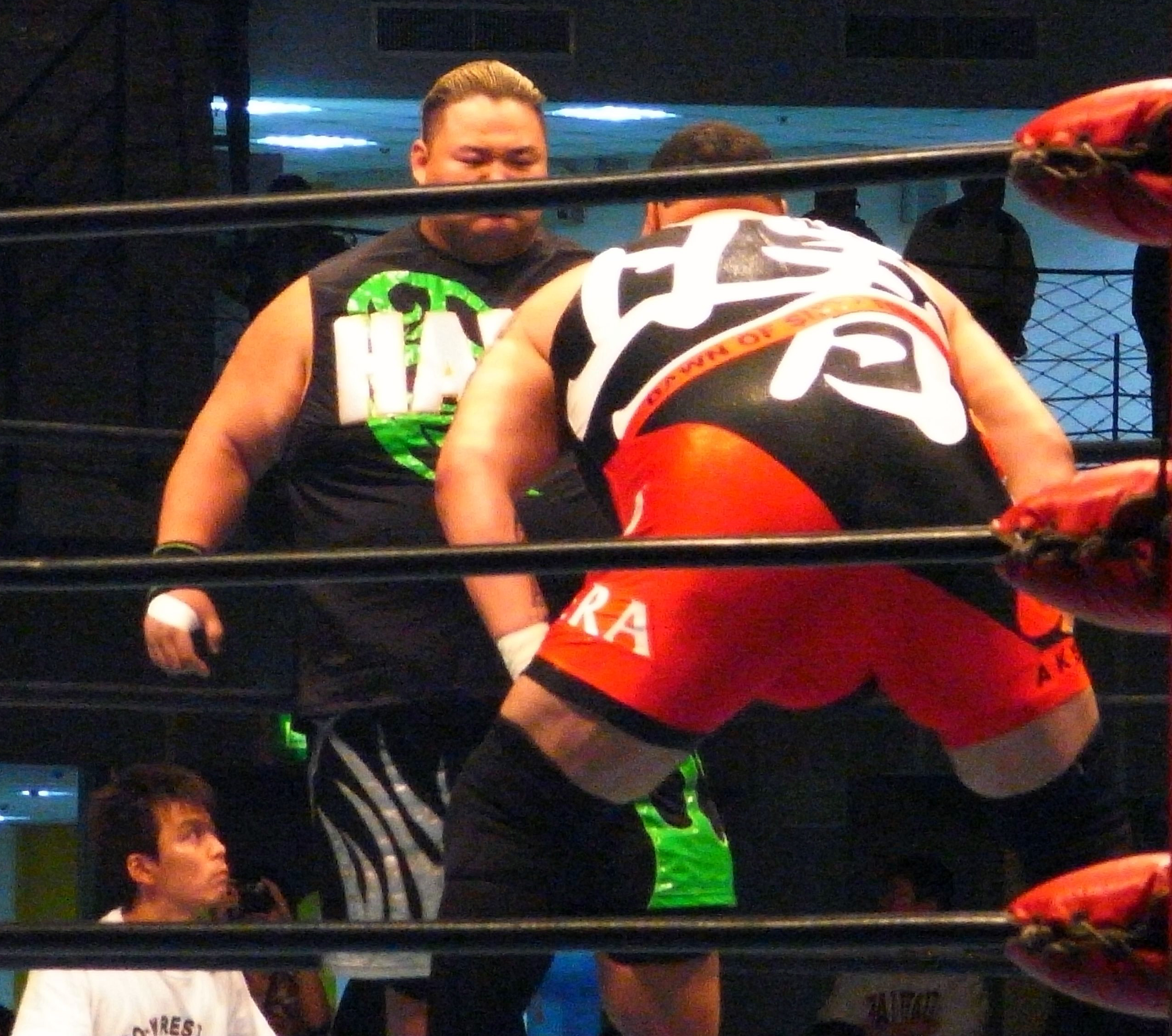

Personal information
- Native name: 北勝嵐 亮太
- Born: Hama Ryōta; 21 November 1979 (age 46) Ibaraki, Osaka
- Height: 1.75 m (5 ft 9 in)
- Weight: 182 kg (401 lb)

Sport
- Sport: Sumo
- Retired: May, 2008
- Heya: Hakkaku
- Record: 235-169-114
- Debut: July, 1995
- Highest rank: Makushita 6 (November, 2001)
- Championships: 1 (Makushita); 1 (Jonidan)
- Updated on Sep. 2021

Hama joined sumo in July 1995, and he fought for the Hakkaku stable run by former yokozuna Hokutoumi. His shikona was Hokutoarashi (meaning "North Victory Storm") and he reached a highest rank of makushita 6 in November 2001. Injury-prone in his knees, he fell greatly in rank and announced his retirement in May 2008. His career record was 235 wins to 169 losses, with 114 absences due to injury.

== Professional wrestling career ==
=== All Japan Pro Wrestling (2008–2013) ===
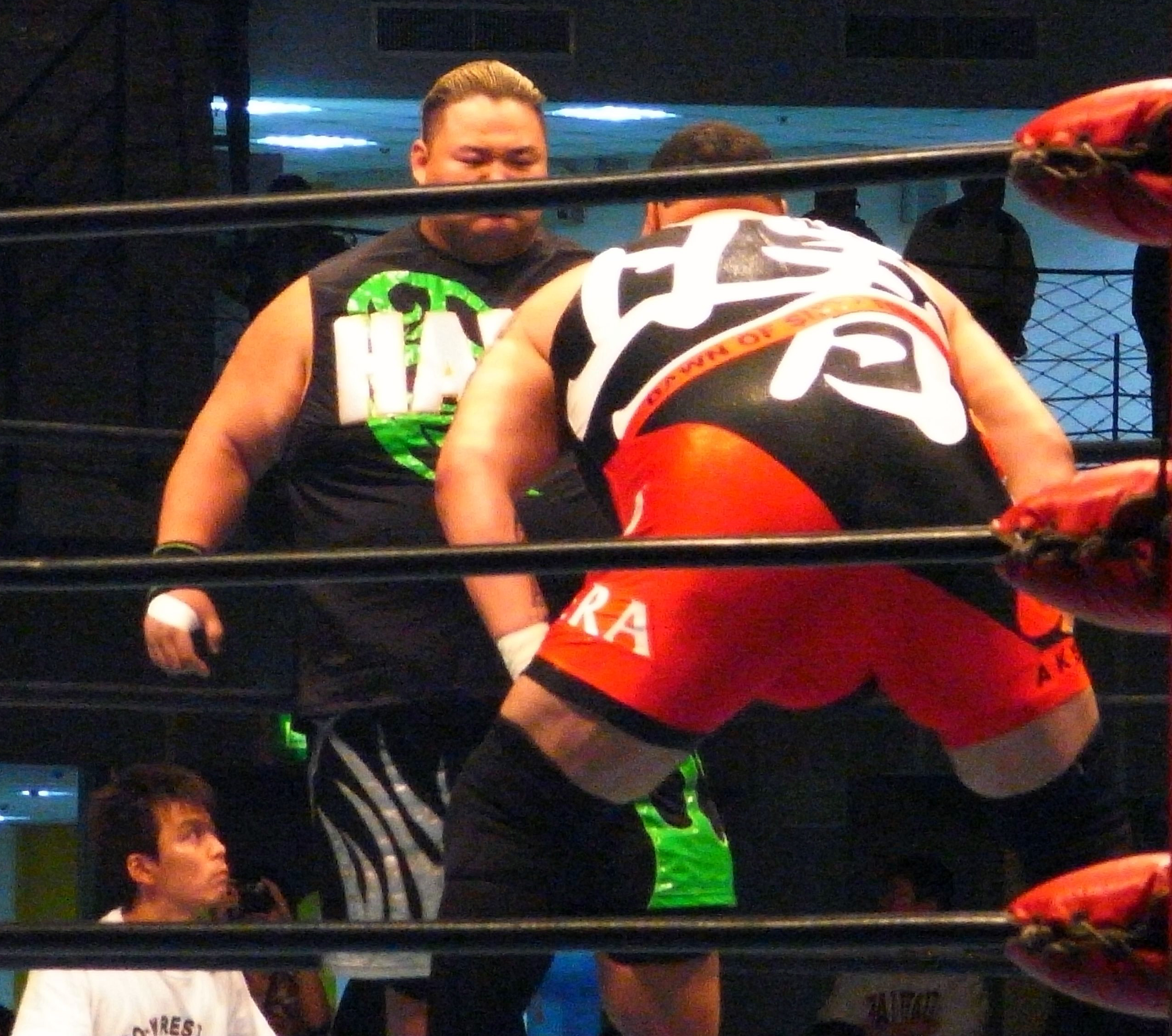
Hama (on the left) and Akebono in 2010

After retiring from sumo, Hama became a professional wrestler. Hama debuted in professional wrestling on November 3, 2008, losing to former Sumo champion Akebono.

On September 23, 2009, Hama and Akebono, known collectively as SMOP (Super Megaton Ohzumo Powers), won the All Asia Tag Team Championship, defeating Minoru Suzuki and Nosawa Rongai. With Akebono as his partner, Hama participated in the 2009 World's Strongest Tag Determination League, finishing 5th out of 9 teams with four victories and four defeats. While still holding the All Asia Tag Team Championship, Hama won the Triple Crown Heavyweight Championship, defeating champion Satoshi Kojima on March 21, 2010. Hama holds the record for fastest superstar to attain the Triple Crown title, winning the title 503 days after his debut.

In 2010, Hama was also part of Suwama's New Generation Force stable, which rivaled Minoru Suzuki and his Partisan Forces faction. After internal trouble in the group, Hama faced fellow member Masayuki Kono in a special match, but Kono defeated him thanks to the help of Kenso and Voodoo Murders, leading Kono to leave New Generation Force and join them. The stable then dissolved, with Hama following Suwama while the other two remaining members, Manabu Soya and Seiya Sanada, went apart.

Hama finished the 2010 Champion Carnival in 4th place in Block A. He earned 4 points having defeated Minoru Suzuki and Seiya Sanada. Hama and Akebono ended up losing the All Asia Tag Team Championship at the hands of Voodoo Murders' Taru and Big Daddy Voodoo on April 29, 2010. Three days later, on May 2, 2010, he lost the Triple Crown Championship in a match against Minoru Suzuki. On June 19, 2013, Hama announced his resignation from All Japan out of loyalty to Keiji Mutoh, who had left the promotion when Nobuo Shiraishi took over as its new president at the beginning of the month.

=== Wrestle-1 (2013–2016) ===
On July 10, 2013, Hama was announced as part of Keiji Mutoh's new Wrestle-1 (W-1) promotion. Hama wrestled on the promotion's inaugural event on September 8, teaming with Yasufumi Nakanoue in a tag team match, where they were defeated by the Pro Wrestling Zero1 team of Kohei Sato and Ryoji Sai. He adopted clothing and mannerisms inspired on WWF's Rikishi, like his trademark thong and Stink Face maneuver. On September 21, 2014, Hama entered the Wrestle-1 Championship tournament, but was defeated in his first round match by Akira. Through Wrestle-1's working relationship with American promotion Total Nonstop Action Wrestling (TNA), Hama worked TNA's Bound for Glory event in Tokyo on October 12, losing to Ethan Carter III. On June 28, 2016, Hama announced he was leaving Wrestle-1 due to his contract with the company expiring.

=== Big Japan Pro Wrestling (2015–present) ===
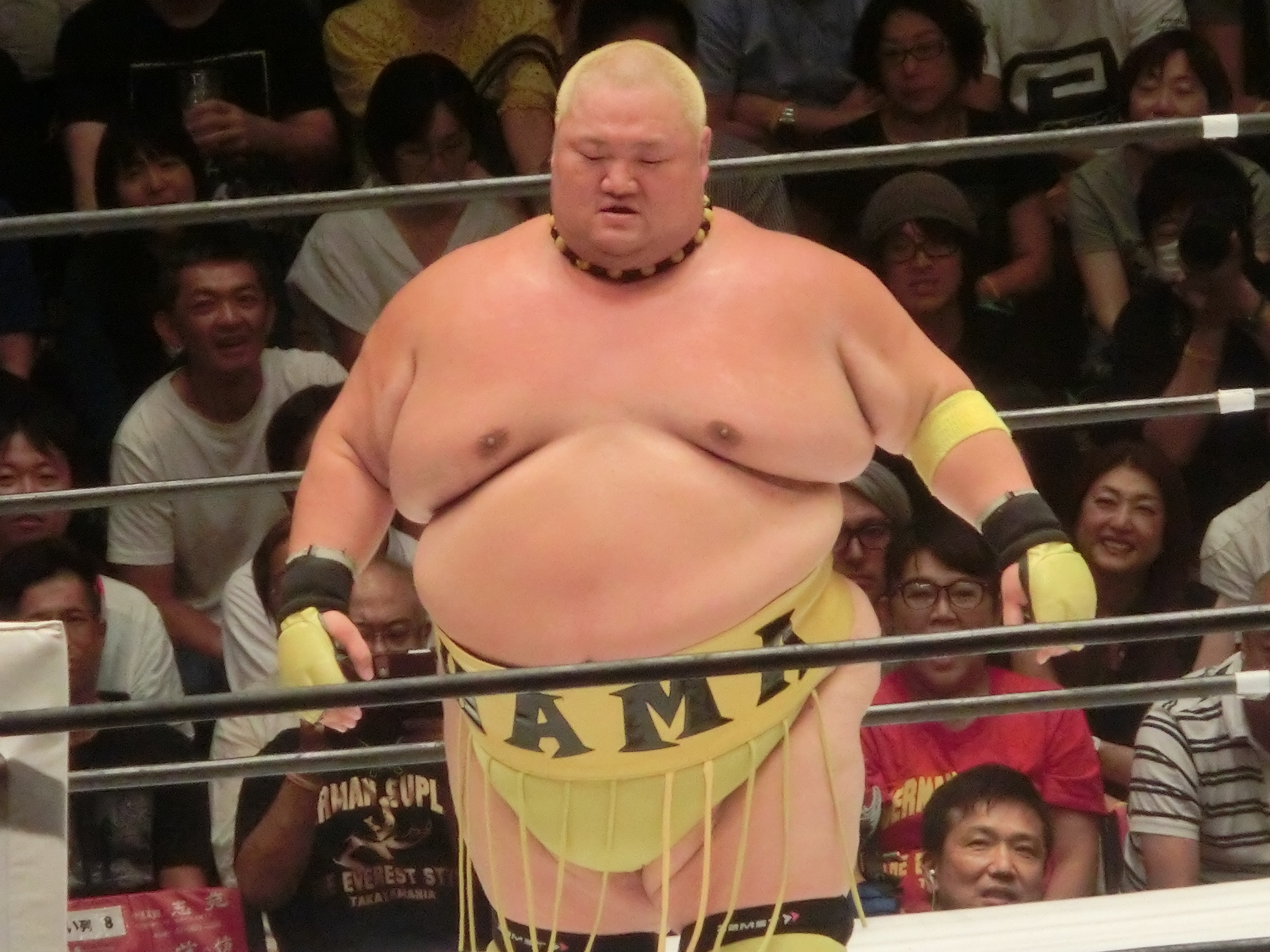
Hama in 2018

In 2015, whilst signed with Wrestle-1, Hama formed a tag team with Hideyoshi Kamitani named Hamakami in Big Japan Pro Wrestling (BJW). They competed in that years Saikyou Tag League as part of the Strong Block. Despite missing the semi-finals, they defeated eventual winners and new BJW Tag Team Champions Strong BJ (Daisuke Sekimoto and Yuji Okabayashi). On December 30, they challenged Strong BJ to a rematch and won the BJW Tag Team Championship. On January 24, 2016, Hama unsuccessfully challenge Okabayashi for the BJW World Strong Heavyweight Championship. Hamakami also lost the BJW Tag Team Championship to Kohei Sato and Shuji Ishikawa on May 30. After leaving Wrestle-1, Hama participated in Pro Wrestling Zero1's Fire Festival and briefly re-formed SMOP in BJW. At Ryogokutan 2016, on July 24, SMOP unsuccessfully challenged Sato and Ishikawa for the BJW Tag Team Championship. Later they entered the 2016 Saikyo Tag League as part of the Strong B Block, cruising through the block to win undefeated. On October 14, they lost to Strong BJ in the quarter-finals. On February 23, 2017, at a Diamond Stars Wrestling event, Hama unsuccessfully challenged Tim Storm for the NWA Worlds Heavyweight Championship. On May 25, he teamed with former Wrestle-1 talent Yasufumi Nakanoue to challenge BJW Tag Team Champions Strong BJ and lost. In July, Hama officially signed with BJW.

Hama continued teaming with Nakanoue and they won the Yokohama Shopping Street 6-Man Tag Team Championship with Shogun Okamoto from Moon Vulcan (Hideki Suzuki, Takuya Nomura and Yoshihisa Uto) on July 3. From September 6 and October 15, Hama and Nakanoue participated in the 2017 Saikyo Tag League as part of the Strong Block; they failed to advance to the semi-finals with only four points. On December 17, Hama, Nakanoue and Okamoto lost the Yokohama Shopping Street title to Daisuke Sekimoto, Hideyoshi Kamitani and Kohei Sato. Hama entered the 2018 Ikkitousen Strong Climb in Block A but failed to progress to the semi-finals. On April 21, Hama, Nakanoue and Yoshihisa Uto won the Yokohama Shopping Street title from Sekimoto, Kamitani and Sato. From May 22 to June 20, they lost and regained the championship on three occasions, before losing the titles permanently to the 3rd Generation Chimidoro Brothers (Masaya Takahashi, Takayuki Ueki and Toshiyuki Sakuda) on July 24. Starting on August 12, Hama and Nakanoue entered the 2018 Saikyo Tag League where the vacant BJW Tag Team Championship was held up. They dominated the Strong Block, gaining ten points from five wins, and defeated Abdullah Kobayashi and Yoshihisa Uto in the semi-finals on October 16. Three days later, they won the Yokohama Shopping Street 6-Man Tag Team Championship from the 3rd Generation Chimidoro Brothers with Takeshi Irei. On October 25, Hama and Nakanoue won the Saikyo Tag League and BJW Tag Team Championship when they defeated Daichi Hashimoto and Hideyoshi Kamitani. At Ryogokutan 2018, on November 11, they successfully defended their titles against Takayuki Ueki and Toshiyuki Sakuda, but lost the Yokohama Shopping Street 6-Man Tag Team Championship to the 3rd Generation Chimidoro Brothers six days later. On December 9, after Hama and Nakanoue made their second successful title defence against Strong BJ, Hama challenged Daisuke Sekimoto for the BJW Strong World Heavyweight Championship. On January 2, 2019, he lost to Sekimoto. On July 21, Hama and Nakanoue lost the BJW Tag Team Championship to Sekimoto and The Bodyguard.

== Sumo career record ==
Hokutoarashi Ryōta
Year	January Hatsu basho, Tokyo	March Haru basho, Osaka	May Natsu basho, Tokyo	July Nagoya basho, Nagoya	September Aki basho, Tokyo	November Kyūshū basho, Fukuoka
1995	x	x	x	(Maezumo)	East Jonokuchi #59; 6–1	East Jonidan #120; 3–4
1996	West Jonidan #146; 4–3	West Jonidan #111; 0–1–6	East Jonidan #182; Sat out due to injury 0–0–7	East Jonokuchi #55; Sat out due to injury 0–0–7	(Banzukegai)	(Banzukegai)
1997	(Maezumo)	West Jonokuchi #50; 6–1	West Jonidan #115; 4–3	East Jonidan #90; 7–0–P	East Sandanme #81; 5–2	East Sandanme #48; 4–3
1998	West Sandanme #32; 4–3	West Sandanme #17; 2–5	East Sandanme #42; 3–4	West Sandanme #54; 6–1	West Sandanme #7; 2–5	West Sandanme #33; 3–4
1999	East Sandanme #48; Sat out due to injury 0–0–7	East Jonidan #8; Sat out due to injury 0–0–7	East Jonidan #78; Sat out due to injury 0–0–7	East Jonidan #148; 7–0–P; Champion	East Sandanme #98; 6–1	East Sandanme #43; 3–4
2000	West Sandanme #61; 2–5	East Sandanme #83; 6–1	East Sandanme #30; 6–1	East Makushita #52; 3–4	East Sandanme #3; 4–3	East Makushita #52; 4–3
2001	West Makushita #42; Sat out due to injury 0–0–7	East Sandanme #22; Sat out due to injury 0–0–7	East Sandanme #83; 6–1	West Sandanme #25; 5–2	West Makushita #59; 7–0; Champion	East Makushita #6; 1–6
2002	East Makushita #26; 4–3	East Makushita #22; 4–3	West Makushita #16; 0–4–3	East Makushita #51; Sat out due to injury 0–0–7	East Makushita #51; 4–3	East Makushita #41; 5–2
2003	West Makushita #24; 2–5	West Makushita #45; 2–5	West Sandanme #4; 1–6	West Sandanme #38; 5–2	East Sandanme #13; 3–4	East Sandanme #28; 1–0–6
2004	West Sandanme #58; 2–1–4	East Sandanme #79; 5–2	West Sandanme #46; 5–2	West Sandanme #15; 4–3	West Sandanme #5; 5–2	West Makushita #51; 4–3
2005	West Makushita #42; 1–6	West Sandanme #9; 5–2	West Makushita #52; 4–3	East Makushita #44; 0–7	West Sandanme #19; Sat out due to injury 0–0–7	West Sandanme #79; 6–1
2006	East Sandanme #22; 5–2	West Makushita #58; 2–5	East Sandanme #22; 5–2	West Makushita #58; 3–4	East Sandanme #15; 5–2	West Makushita #54; Sat out due to injury 0–0–7
2007	West Sandanme #34; Sat out due to injury 0–0–7	West Sandanme #94; Sat out due to injury 0–0–7	West Jonidan #54; Sat out due to injury 0–0–7	West Jonidan #124; 6–1	West Jonidan #42; 5–2	East Jonidan #7; 5–2
2008	West Sandanme #74; 2–5	East Sandanme #95; 6–1	West Sandanme #35; Retired; 0–3–4	x	x	x
Record given as wins–losses–absences Top division champion Top division runner-up Retired Lower divisions Non-participation Sanshō key: F=Fighting spirit; O=Outstanding performance; T=Technique Also shown: ★=Kinboshi; P=Playoff(s); Divisions: Makuuchi — Jūryō — Makushita — Sandanme — Jonidan — Jonokuchi Makuuchi ranks: Yokozuna — Ōzeki — Sekiwake — Komusubi — Maegashira

== Championships and accomplishments ==
- All Japan Pro Wrestling

- All Asia Tag Team Championship (2 times) – with Akebono
- Triple Crown Heavyweight Championship (1 time)
- F-1 Tag Team Championship (1 time) – with Koriki Choshu^{1}
- Akiho Yoshizawa Cup (2010) – with Keiji Mutoh and Masakatsu Funaki

- Big Japan Pro Wrestling

- BJW Tag Team Championship (2 times) – with Hideyoshi Kamitani (1) and Yasufumi Nakanoue (1)
- Yokohama Shopping Street 6-Man Tag Team Championship (6 times) – with Shogun Okamoto and Yasufumi Nakanoue (1), Yasufumi Nakanoue and Yoshihisa Uto (4), and Yasufumi Nakanoue and Takeshi Irei (1)
- Saikyo Tag League (2018) – with Yasufumi Nakanoue

- Pro Wrestling Illustrated

- Ranked No. 24 of the top 500 singles wrestlers in the PWI 500 in 2010

- Tokyo Sports

- Best Tag Team Award (2009) – with Akebono
- Newcomer Award (2009)

^{1}This championship is not officially recognized by All Japan Pro Wrestling.
