= Keiji Muto =

Japanese professional wrestler (born 1962)

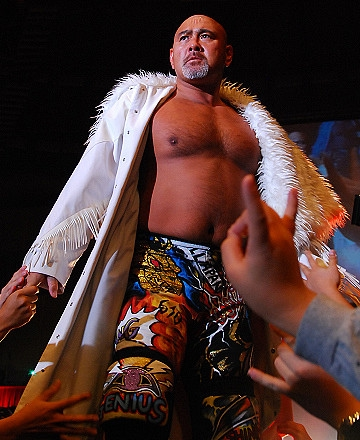
- Muto in 2009

Personal information
- Born: December 23, 1962 (age 63) Fujiyoshida, Yamanashi, Japan
- Spouse: Hisae Ashida (m. 1992)
- Children: 2

Professional wrestling career
- Ring name(s): Bach Mutoh; The Black Ninja; Great Mota (The) Great Muta; Keiji Muto; Kokushi; Kokushi-Muso; The Space Lone Wolf; The Super Black Ninja; The Super Ninja; Takeda Shingen; Viet Cong Ming; The White Ninja
- Billed height: 1.88 m (6 ft 2 in)
- Billed weight: 104.5 kg (230 lb)
- Billed from: Tokyo, Japan; New Orleans, Louisiana (as the Great Muta); The Land of the Rising Sun (as the Great Muta)
- Trained by: Antonio Inoki; Hiro Matsuda; Kotetsu Yamamoto
- Debut: October 5, 1984
- Retired: February 21, 2023

Keiji Muto (武藤 敬司, Mutō Keiji; born December 23, 1962) (Note: Also spelt Mutoh.) is a Japanese professional wrestling executive, actor and retired professional wrestler. He is known for his work under his real name and as his alter ego The Great Muta (グレート・ムタ, Gurēto Muta) in New Japan Pro-Wrestling (NJPW) and World Championship Wrestling (WCW) during the 1980s and 1990s. He is also known for his runs in both All Japan Pro-Wrestling (AJPW) between 2001 and 2013, and his run in Pro Wrestling Noah (NOAH) from 2020 to 2023. He was the president of All Japan Pro Wrestling (AJPW) from 2002 to 2013 and representative director of Wrestle-1 (W-1) from 2013 until its closure in 2020.

Considered one of the greatest and most influential wrestlers of all time, Muto is one of the first Japanese wrestlers (puroresura) to gain an international fanbase in the 1990s and beyond, thanks in large part to his Great Muta gimmick. The gimmick is one of the most influential in puroresu, emulated by many wrestlers, and seen as the most prevalent of Muto's alter ego's. Many wrestlers copied or modified some of the moves that he popularized or innovated, such as the Shining Wizard, Moonsault (also known as the Rounding Body Press), Muta Lock, and the Dragon-screw leg-whip. He took part in what was generally considered to be one of the bloodiest professional wrestling matches at the time against Hiroshi Hase, leading to the creation of the "Muta scale", which rates the bloodiness of matches relative to this one's 1.0 value.

Muto is one of the five wrestlers to win the three major championships of puroresu (AJPW's Triple Crown Heavyweight Championship, NJPW's IWGP Heavyweight Championship, and Pro Wrestling Noah's GHC Heavyweight Championship) with Kensuke Sasaki, Yoshihiro Takayama, Satoshi Kojima, and Yuji Nagata. He also held the NWA Worlds Heavyweight Championship, making him an overall nine-time world champion. He is also a 13-time world tag team champion with five AJPW World Tag Team Championships, six IWGP Tag Team Championships, one GHC Tag Team Championship, and one WCW World Tag Team Championship. In total, he held 32 championships throughout his 38-year career.

In 2013, Muto founded W-1, where he also wrestled semi-regularly. He made special appearances for the American promotion Total Nonstop Action Wrestling (TNA, renamed Impact Wrestling in 2017) from 2014 to 2019, as part of a talent exchange with W-1. In June 2022, Muto announced that he would retire in 2023. His retirement matches occurred on February 21, 2023, in the Tokyo Dome during Noah's Keiji Muto Grand Final Pro-Wrestling "Last-Love" event, first against his scheduled opponent Tetsuya Naito, and second in an impromptu double-retirement match against Masahiro Chono. In April 2023, Muto was inducted into the WWE Hall of Fame.

== Professional wrestling career ==
=== New Japan Pro-Wrestling (1984–1988) ===
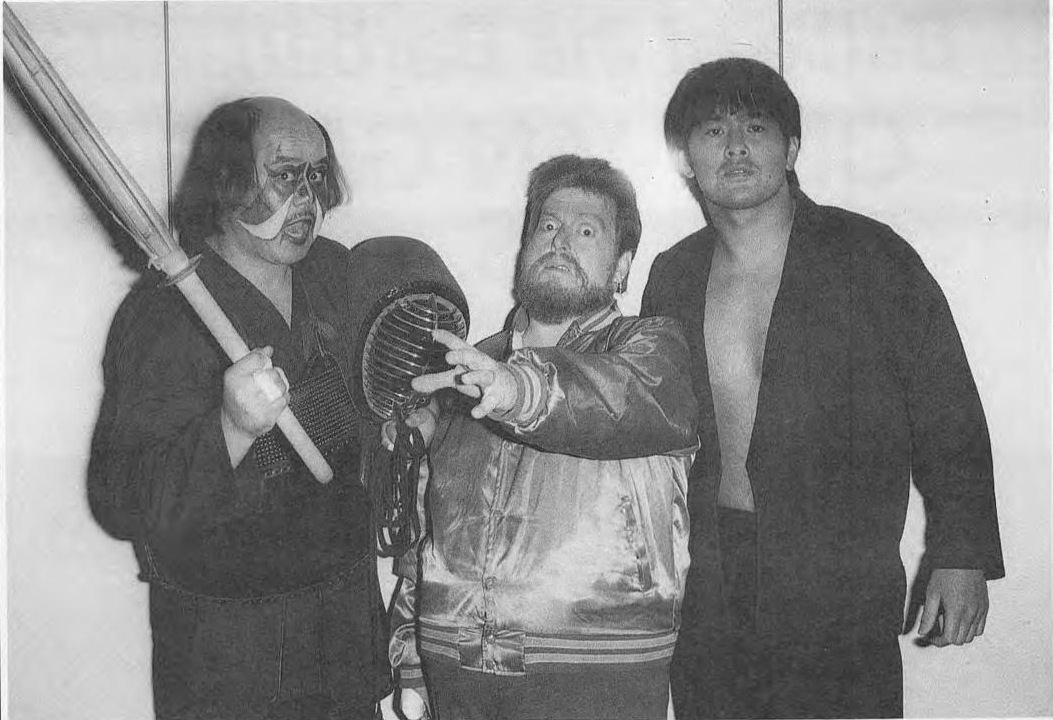
Muto (right) with Kazuo Sakurada (left) and manager Oliver Humperdink (center), circa 1986

Muto was an accomplished amateur wrestler and a judo black belt with experience in many national competitions prior to being trained by Hiro Matsuda in the New Japan Pro-Wrestling Dojo. He debuted on October 5, 1984, against Masahiro Chono. In 1985, Muto was sent on his first learning excursion to the United States. Primarily wrestling in Championship Wrestling from Florida as the "White Ninja", Muto teamed with Kendo Nagasaki. During his first excursion, Muto became a one-time NWA Florida Heavyweight Champion and a one-time NWA Southeastern United States Junior Heavyweight Champion. Muto returned to New Japan in 1986, where he was nicknamed "Space Lone Wolf", a space-age type character that was briefly revived in 2005 by NOSAWA Rongai.

In March 1987, Muto won the IWGP Tag Team Championship with Shiro Koshinaka, before losing the titles to Akira Maeda and Nobuhiko Takada six days later. In the summer of 1987, Muto took part in the NOW vs. NEW feud, in which he aligned himself with Antonio Inoki and his group, teaming with the likes of Inoki, Seiji Sakaguchi, Yoshiaki Fujiwara, and Kantaro Hoshino, and battling the likes of Tatsumi Fujinami, Riki Choshu, Akira Maeda, Kengo Kimura, and Super Strong Machine.

=== Capitol Sports Promotions (1988) ===
In January 1988, Muto went on another excursion, this time in Puerto Rico for Capitol Sports Promotions under his new ring name, "Super Black Ninja". He feuded with Miguel Perez Jr., with whom he lost a hair vs. hair match to that April. It was in Puerto Rico he formed the Three Musketeers with Masahiro Chono and Shinya Hashimoto. He wrestled only one match in New Japan during this period on July 29, before returning to Puerto Rico.

=== World Class Championship Wrestling (1988–1989) ===
In the fall of 1988, Muto moved to the Dallas, Texas-based World Class Championship Wrestling under the name Super Black Ninja, where he reunited with Kendo Nagasaki and had a feud with Kevin Von Erich before departing the organization in March 1989. Muto's personality and ring skills shown in his early American matches earned him a high billing within the National Wrestling Alliance (NWA).

=== World Championship Wrestling (1989–1990) ===
Muto first appeared as "Great Mota" in the NWA's World Championship Wrestling territory on the March 18, 1989, edition of WCW Saturday Night. His manager Gary Hart introduced him as the son of the Great Kabuki, whom Gary Hart also had managed years earlier. He defeated Cougar Jay in his debut match. Muto's name would eventually be changed to "The Great Muta". Muta would feud with stars like Lex Luger, Ric Flair, and Sting, from whom he would capture the WCW World Television Championship on September 3, 1989. Muto eventually lost the championship to Arn Anderson on January 2, 1990, which aired on the January 12, 1990, edition of WCW Power Hour, and some time after the Clash of the Champions X on February 6, Muto would return to New Japan, going between his real name and his Muta gimmick as he pleased.

=== New Japan Pro-Wrestling (1990–2002) ===
==== Rise to prominence (1990–1992) ====
Muto quickly rose in the ranks upon returning to New Japan Pro-Wrestling in March 1990. He made his in-ring return to NJPW on April 27 by teaming with Masahiro Chono to defeat Shinya Hashimoto and Masa Saito to win the IWGP Tag Team Championship, marking Muto's second reign with the title. He and Chono would hold the titles for over six months, before finally losing them to Hiroshi Hase and Kensuke Sasaki on November 1. During this time, Muto also entered the Kyushu Cup tournament on June 12, in which he defeated Chono to advance to the finals of the tournament, where he lost to Hashimoto. On September 7, Muto introduced his Great Muta moniker for the first time in NJPW during a match against Samurai Shiro, which Muto won. Muto would occasionally perform the Muta gimmick for major matches while competing under his real name for regular matches. On September 30, Muta picked up a huge win over Ricky Steamboat.

Muto revived his Great Muta moniker at the WCW and NJPW-jointly promoted Starrcade in Tokyo Dome event on March 21, 1991, where he defeated Sting. Later that year, Muto and Chono, along with Hashimoto, cemented their status as the next generation of New Japan, surpassing Antonio Inoki, Tatsumi Fujinami, and Riki Choshu, after the finals of the first G1 Climax tournament on August 11. He lost to Scott Norton but defeated Tatsumi Fujinami and Big Van Vader in his block to advance to the final against Chono, which turned out to be an epic thirty-minute match in which Muto was bested by Chono and, together with Hashimoto, the three celebrated in the ring, then afterwards they were officially labeled "The Three Musketeers" of New Japan Pro-Wrestling. In October, Muto paired with Hiroshi Hase to participate in the 1991 Super Tag League, where they lost three of their tournament matches and won three, narrowly missing the chance to qualify for the knockout stage. However, shortly after the tournament, the duo found success as they defeated Rick Steiner and Scott Norton to win the IWGP Tag Team Championship at Budokan Hall on November 5.

On January 4, 1992, Muto headlined the Super Warriors in Tokyo Dome event as Great Muta by teaming with Sting for the first time ever to defeat The Steiner Brothers at the Tokyo Dome. This was the first January 4 Tokyo Dome Show, which would become the flagship event for NJPW in years to come. At the NJPW 20th Anniversary Show on March 1, Muto and Hase lost the IWGP Tag Team Championship to Big Van Vader and Crusher Bam Bam Bigelow. Muto continued to rise as a singles competitor, gaining his first title shot at the prestigious IWGP Heavyweight Championship against Riki Choshu on May 17, which he failed to win. Muto participated in the 1992 G1 Climax for the vacant NWA World Heavyweight Championship, defeating Barry Windham in the opening round in Shizuoka on August 6 and Steve Austin in the quarterfinals on August 10, before losing to the eventual winner Masahiro Chono in the semi-finals on August 11.

==== IWGP Heavyweight Champion (1992–1996) ====
On August 16, Muto donned his Great Muta persona to beat Japanese legend Riki Choshu to win the Greatest 18 Club Championship and the IWGP Heavyweight Championship for the first time, thus winning the first world championship of his professional wrestling career. He successfully defended both titles against Shinya Hashimoto on September 23 and then retired the Greatest 18 Club Championship to focus on defending the IWGP Heavyweight Championship. He successfully defended the title against Scott Norton on October 18 and Sting on November 22. On December 14, Muta faced Hiroshi Hase in a winning effort in a famous match where Hase used a foreign object to beat at Muta's forehead, as payback for their previous encounters, including the September 14, 1990, encounter, in which Muta busted Hase open. Muta bladed and cut very deeply into his forehead. As a result of this, Muta bled profusely for the rest of the match, and to this day he still bears scars from where he sliced.

On January 4, 1993, Muta defeated Masahiro Chono in a title versus title match at Fantastic Story in Tokyo Dome (known in North America as WCW/New Japan Supershow III) to retain the IWGP Heavyweight Championship and win the NWA World Heavyweight Championship, thus becoming the second of the only two men to hold both titles at the same time, the first being Tatsumi Fujinami. After losing the NWA title in WCW, Muta had a variety of challengers in title matches and exhibitions throughout the year. He lost to Hulk Hogan at Wrestling Dontaku in May and then successfully defended his IWGP title against The Great Kabuki on June 15. After holding the title for longer than a year, Muta finally lost the title to Shinya Hashimoto on September 20. Following this title loss and a match with Hogan against the Hell Raisers (Hawk Warrior and Power Warrior) on September 23, Muto returned to fighting primarily under his real name, reviving the Muta name for certain matches. On December 10, Muto received a rematch against Hashimoto for the IWGP Heavyweight Championship, which he failed to win.

Muto resumed teaming with Hiroshi Hase in the fall of 1993 and the duo wrestled the Steiner Brothers in a losing effort at Battlefield on January 4, 1994. Muto reprised his Great Muta moniker for a dream match against the legendary Antonio Inoki at May's Wrestling Dontaku, which Muta lost. In October, Muto and Hase entered the Super Grade Tag League, where they lost only two matches in the tournament, winning rest of their matches and scored fourteen points, thus advancing to the finals on October 30, where they defeated Masahiro Chono and Super Strong Machine to win the tournament, thus earning an IWGP Tag Team Championship opportunity against Hell Raisers on November 25, which Muto and Hase won, thus marking their second reign as a team and Muto's fourth individual tag title reign. They successfully defended the titles against Steiner Brothers in their first title defense at Battle 7 on January 4, 1995.

On February 3, Muto lost to Scott Norton in a #1 contender's match for the IWGP Heavyweight Championship. However, Muto received an opportunity for the title against Shinya Hashimoto at Wrestling Dontaku on May 3, where he defeated Hashimoto to capture his second IWGP Heavyweight Championship and subsequently vacated the IWGP Tag Team Championship three days later on May 6 to focus on defending the IWGP Heavyweight Championship. Muto successfully defended the title against Hiroyoshi Tenzan on June 14 and Hawk Warrior on July 13, before winning the G1 Climax in August, beating Hashimoto in the finals to become the first of two men to win the G1 Climax as IWGP Heavyweight Champion as Kensuke Sasaki would achieve this feat in 2000. Muto held the IWGP title throughout the rest of the year. On September 25, Muto successfully defended the title against Junji Hirata. He would then lead New Japan in the opening battles of the feud with Nobuhiko Takada and the UWF-i army, defeating Takada in his fourth title defense on October 9. Muto closed the year with his fifth successful title defense against Shiro Koshinaka on December 11. Muto finally lost the title to Takada at Wrestling World on January 4, 1996.

==== nWo Japan (1996–2000) ====
The latter half of 1996 had Muto pitted against Masahiro Chono's Ookami Gundan, which eventually blossomed into a war with the Chono-led nWo Japan. In the process, Muto began teasing at a possible turn to the side of the nWo, proclaiming himself to be the true successor to Antonio Inoki's legacy, and "accidentally" attacking his own partners in the middle of a match. During this period, Muto underwent a long slump in big matches, losing not only to members of the nWo, but fellow New Japan wrestlers including Power Warrior at Wrestling World on January 4, 1997, and Shinya Hashimoto for the IWGP Heavyweight Championship on June 5. The turn was teased many times. Muto would even wear an nWo shirt only to proclaim days later that he refused to join Chono's army. Muto further raised confusion by playing both sides of the feud; fighting as a member of New Japan under his real name, and as The Great Muta in nWo Japan, before being The Great Muta full-time for several months in 1997. The full turn came in September 1997, when Muto, after teasing a turn on his nWo teammates, double-crossed Kensuke Sasaki and Kazuo Yamazaki, sealing away the Muta name and formally joining nWo Japan as himself. Almost immediately following this, he and Chono dominated the tag team scene in NJPW, defeating Yamazaki and Sasaki for their second IWGP Tag Team Championship reign as a duo on October 19, and spray-painting the plates of the belts black as a show of disrespect for the championship's legacy. They continued their dominance in the tag team division by winning the Super Grade Tag League by defeating Manabu Nakanishi and Shinya Hashimoto in the final on December 8.

On January 4, 1998, Muto headlined Final Power Hall in Tokyo Dome as he unsuccessfully challenged Kensuke Sasaki for the IWGP Heavyweight Championship. Muto and Chono were forced to vacate the IWGP Tag Team Championship on April 21, when Muto injured his knees, as his years of using the moonsault press were finally catching up to him. During this time, he took a hiatus from action, returning just before the 1998 G1 Climax, from which he was eliminated by Genichiro Tenryu in the first round. Despite his return, Muto was plagued by this nagging injury, fighting through his pain throughout the rest of 1998 and all of 1999. Towards the end of 1998, Muto took the leadership of nWo Japan, after Chono suffered a neck injury and was out of action, turning the nWo into a face stable. Muto would then team with teammate Satoshi Kojima as they won the Super Grade Tag League by defeating Shinya Hashimoto and Tatsumi Fujinami in the final on December 6.

At Wrestling World on January 4, 1999, Muto defeated one of Chono's right-hand men, Scott Norton to win his third IWGP Heavyweight Championship. The following month, Masahiro Chono returned to NJPW and disagreed with Muto over Muto's philosophy and leadership of the nWo Japan, thus leaving the group and Muto feuded with Chono for the name of the nWo, which evolved into a war between the nWo, led by Muto, Hiroyoshi Tenzan, and Satoshi Kojima and Chono's new Team 2000 unit, with himself, Don Frye, Super J, and others from the old generation of the nWo. Muto successfully defended the IWGP Heavyweight Championship against Kensuke Sasaki at St. Valentine's Day Massacre, Team 2000 member Don Frye at Strong Style Symphony, Genichiro Tenryu on May 5 and Satoshi Kojima on July 20.

In August, Muto entered the G1 Climax, where he lost only one match to Tatsumi Fujinami while winning the rest of his matches in the block thus qualifying to the final against Manabu Nakanishi, which he lost, leading to a match between Muto and Nakanishi for the IWGP Heavyweight Championship at Final Dome, where Muto retained. Muto revived Great Muta character at Jingu Climax on August 28 for a No Rope Explosive Barbed Wire Barricade Explosive Land Mine Double Hell Deathmatch against Great Nita, which Muta won. The following month, Muto entered the Super Grade Tag League with stablemate Scott Norton, which they won by defeating Manabu Nakanishi and Yuji Nagata in the final. On December 10, Muto finally lost the IWGP Heavyweight Championship to Genichiro Tenryu. The war between Chono and Muto was lost by Muto at the 2000 Wrestling World event as he was defeated by Chono. Muto took an extended hiatus to rehabilitate his damaged knees after that, focusing instead on one last run in America for WCW, thus marking the dissolution of nWo Japan as it merged into Chono's Team 2000.

==== Bad Ass Translate Trading (2001–2002) ====
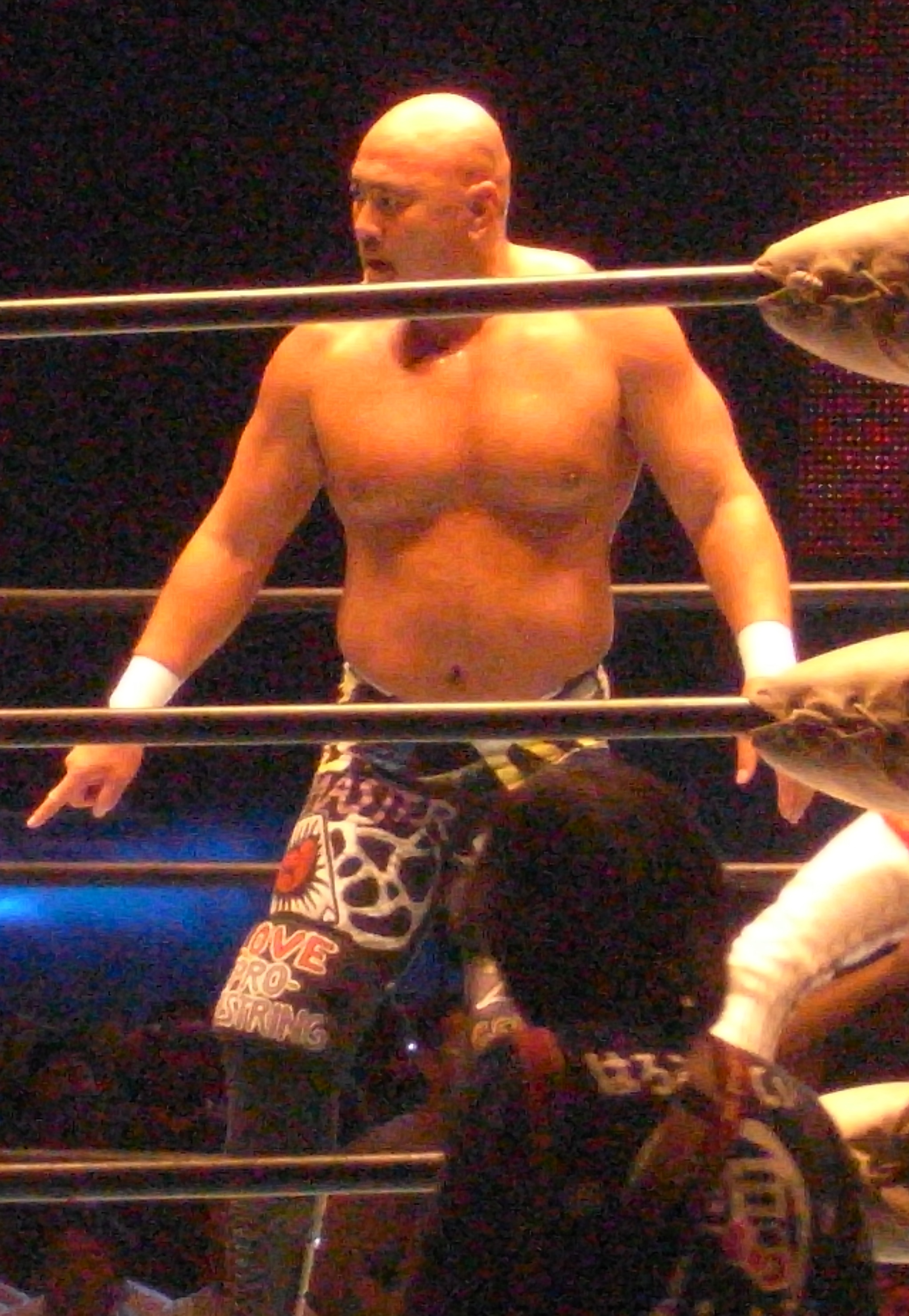
Muto in 2008

After a planned tag team match with FMW's Hayabusa for Wrestling World 2001 was cancelled due to Hayabusa's injury to both his elbows that required reconstructive surgery, it seemed as if Muto reached a confusing crossroads in his career; however, he chose to completely change his image, shaving his head bald (he had a pronounced receding hairline throughout much of 2000), growing out a goatee, and aligning himself with a fellow NJPW wrestler who had gone overseas for an extended period of time, Shinjiro Otani. The two returned to New Japan on January 4, 2001, at Wrestling World, making short work of Manabu Nakanishi and Jushin Liger. Shortly after, Muto also began appearing for All Japan Pro Wrestling, where he debuted at King's Road New Century by defeating Taiyō Kea. On February 18, Muto debuted his new trademark move, the Shining Wizard, to defeat Kazunari Murakami. Since its creation, it has become an extremely popular move on both sides of the Pacific, used by Muto's allies, rivals, and fans of his work. Muto would begin appearing in both New Japan and on a part-time basis All Japan, which led to Muto creating a new stable with Don Frye and Shinjiro Otani which later came to be known as Bad Ass Translate Trading (BATT). Added to their ranks were Taiyō Kea of All Japan Pro Wrestling and Jinsei Shinzaki of Michinoku Pro Wrestling. Muto defeated AJPW's veteran Toshiaki Kawada in a dream match at Champion Carnival One Night Special on April 14. At Super Force Group Declaration, Muto defeated Hiroshi Hase, then a member of All Japan, which led to Hase joining BATT as well.

Muto then entered the 2001 G1 Climax, where he won all matches in his block, with the exception of a loss to Satoshi Kojima, thus qualifying for the semi-final on August 11, in which he defeated Tadao Yasuda and then lost to Yuji Nagata in the final a day later. Muto would then defend the Triple Crown Heavyweight Championship for the first time in New Japan against Scott Hall on September 23, which Muto retained. Muto and Hase would then lose to Yuji Nagata and Jun Akiyama at Indicate of Next.

Muto captured more gold by winning All Japan's World Tag Team Championship alongside stablemate Taiyō Kea by defeating Genichiro Tenryu and Yoji Anjo on October 22. Muto would then successfully defend the Triple Crown Heavyweight Championship against Masahiro Chono at an All Japan event on October 27. The following day, at a New Japan event, Muto and Kea defeated Osamu Nishimura and Tatsumi Fujinami in a title versus title match to win the IWGP Tag Team Championship as well, thus giving Muto a total of six belts at one time. Muto and Kea would win that year's Real World Tag League by defeating Mitsuya Nagai and Toshiaki Kawada in the final. Muto closed out the year with a successful title defense of the Triple Crown Heavyweight Championship against Tatsumi Fujinami at a New Japan event on December 11.

Muto wrestled his last match as a member of the New Japan roster at Wrestling World 2002 on January 4, 2002, where he alongside his teammate Hiroshi Hase defeated Osamu Nishimura and Tatsumi Fujinami. Muto would then defect full-time to All Japan, which led to him and Kea being stripped off the IWGP Tag Team Championship on February 2.

=== World Championship Wrestling (1990–1995, 2000) ===
==== Sporadic appearances (1990–1995) ====
At Clash of the Champions XIII in November 1990, it was announced that The Great Muta would be returning to World Championship Wrestling at Starrcade '90: Collision Course the following month to team with Mr. Saito. At Starrcade, Muto teamed with Saito in the Pat O'Connor Memorial Tag-Team Tournament at Starrcade. The duo defeated The New Zealand Militia in the quarterfinals, then Victor Zangiev and Salmon Hasimikov (representing the USSR) in the semi-finals. Muta and Saito were defeated by then US Tag Team Champions The Steiner Brothers in the finals.

Muta continued to make sporadic appearances within WCW during 1991 while wrestling regularly in New Japan. He was shown in attendance at WrestleWar 91, and then defeated old rival Sting at the combined New Japan/WCW Starrcade event on March 21, 1991, in Tokyo, Japan. Muto was entered into a match with United States Heavyweight Champion Lex Luger to determine the Number One Contender for the WCW World Heavyweight Championship. On June 12 at Clash of the Champions XV, Muta was pinned by Luger to earn the right to challenge Ric Flair at The Great American Bash '91. He went on to wrestle several house shows that month before returning to Japan.

In May he returned again to WCW and began appearing on house shows in tag-team matches with Nikita Koloff against Big Van Vader and Rick Rude. He returned to television on the May 30 episode of WCW Saturday Night, defeating Brad Armstrong in a best of three contest. On June 7 Muta was pinned by Scott Steiner at a house show at the Omni in Atlanta, GA. He finished out his short run facing Larry Zbyszko on successive house shows, then returned to New Japan. On December 25, he returned to WCW to begin another short stint, losing to Sting in a non-title match in Jacksonville, Florida. He wrestled Sting again on the house show circuit, as well as Steve Austin. On December 28 he made his fourth successive Starrcade appearance, teaming with Barry Windham to defeat Brian Pillman and 2 Cold Scorpio. Later that night Muta eliminated Windham to win the Starrcade '92: Battlebowl – The Lethal Lottery II BattleBowl.

On April 17, 1994, Muto returned to WCW to face Stunning Steve Austin at Spring Stampede for the WCW United States Championship. Austin defeated him by disqualification. This would be his last US appearance for nearly a year, and he would not return until February 19, 1995, when he was shown in the crowd at SuperBrawl IV. He returned to WCW on May 21, 1995, to defeat Paul Orndorff at Slamboree '95: A Legends' Reunion.

==== Dark Carnival (2000) ====
After suffering a knee injury in early 2000, Muto took a hiatus from NJPW and returned to WCW in mid-2000 to team with Vampiro. Due to the bad booking and the decline of WCW in its last years, however, Muto could not recapture the previous popularity he had in the late 1980s and early 1990s. He returned to television on the July 11, 2000, episode of Thunder and teamed with The Jung Dragons against Three Count and Tank Abbott. A week later he appeared on Nitro, defeating Vampiro in the quarterfinals of the United States Heavyweight Championship tournament. Later that night he was pinned by Mike Awesome in the semifinals. He won the WCW World Tag-Team Championship with Vampiro at New Blood Rising against KroniK. They lost it the next night on Nitro against the team of Rey Mysterio and Juventud Guerrera. His last WCW match came at a house show on September 23, 2000, in Lubbock, TX against Sting.

After leaving WCW, a no-compete clause in his WCW contract prevented him from competing in the World Wrestling Federation.

=== All Japan Pro Wrestling (2001–2013) ===
==== Triple Crown Heavyweight Champion (2001–2003) ====
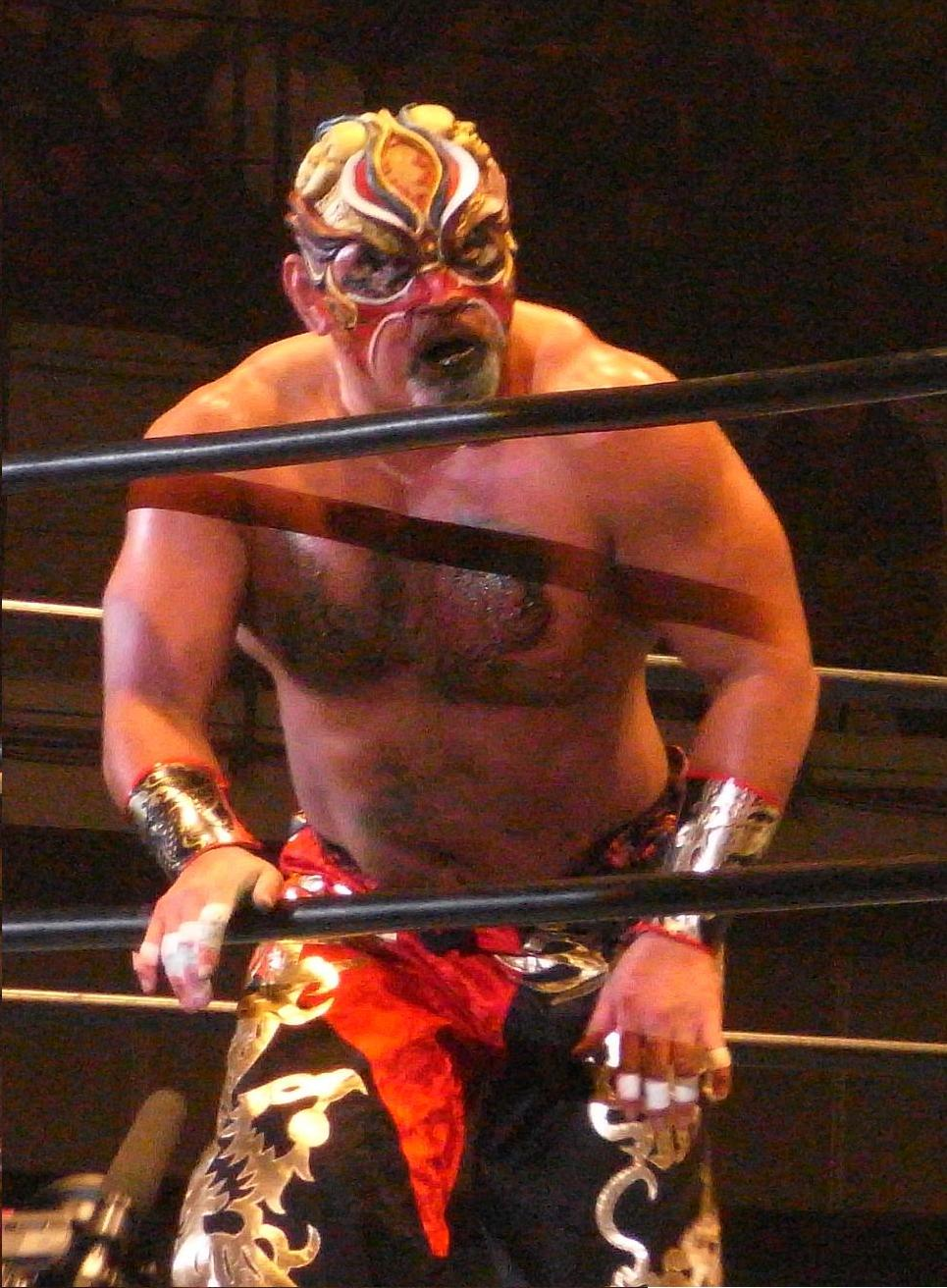
Muto as The Great Muta in November 2009

Muto, as a member of New Japan Pro-Wrestling, made part-time appearances to All Japan in 2001, fighting Toshiaki Kawada and "Dr. Death" Steve Williams in major singles matches on pay-per-view. 2001 proved to be Muto's year of renewal besides the formation of his BATT unit in New Japan, as he challenged, and defeated Genichiro Tenryu for All Japan's coveted Triple Crown Heavyweight Championship on June 8. In Muto's first title defense on July 14, Steve Williams lost to Muto for the Triple Crown Heavyweight Championship in a pay-per-view main event, where it ended in an altercation. After leaving the backstage area Williams would then going on a huge swearing tirade, where he kicked a trash can, was about to cry in tears, and then throwing his arm-pads to the ground while swearing again. Such scenes never happened in the traditional All Japan and was characteristic to the "crash TV" style of Vince Russo's writing. This would ultimately lead Muto to a grudge feud with Williams into 2002.

On January 11, 2002, following the end of a year-long cross-promotional angle with New Japan Pro-Wrestling, Keiji Muto shocked the Japanese wrestling world by defecting to All-Japan as a full-time competitor, taking Satoshi Kojima and Kendo Kashin with him. In his first match as an AJPW contracted wrestler, Muto and Taiyo Kea successfully defended the World Tag Team Championship against Mike Barton and Jim Steele on January 14. Muto would then lose the Triple Crown Heavyweight Championship to Toshiaki Kawada on February 24. Returning to his grudge feud with Steve Williams, Muto had a singles match against Williams on pay-per-view, which Williams ultimately won and got his revenge for losing the year prior. In April, Muto participated in the 2002 Champion Carnival, where he lost only two matches in his block while winning the rest of his matches and thus advancing to the knockout stage on April 10, where he defeated Satoshi Kojima in the semi-final and Mike Barton (Bart Gunn) in the final to win the tournament. Three days later, at Grand Champion Carnival, Muto faced Genichiro Tenryu in a match for the vacant Triple Crown Heavyweight Championship after Kawada was forced to vacate the title due to injury. Muto lost the match. The following month, on May 12, Muto teamed with George Hines and Kaz Hayashi as the trio won the Giant Baba Six-Man Cup tournament. On July 17, Muto and Kea lost the World Tag Team Championship to KroniK.

At the Nippon Budokan on July 20, Muto wrestled as three different characters on the card: "Kokushi Muso", defeating Kaz Hayashi on the second match, himself in a six-man tag team match in the mid-card, and in the second-to-last match, he defeated Satoshi Kojima, under his "Great Koji" persona, as The Great Muta. On September 30, during an All Japan 30th Anniversary party at the famed Tokyo City Hotel, Mokoto Baba officially announced Muto's appointment as the new president of All Japan, transferring all of the Baba family stock to him. Despite this position, however, Muto continued to wrestle full-time for the promotion.

At Royal Road 30 Giant Battle In Budokan Final Battle on October 27, Muto under his Great Muta moniker, defeated Genichiro Tenryu to win his second Triple Crown Heavyweight Championship. The following month, he lost to Bob Sapp in a non-title match at Wrestle-1. Muto then entered the Real World Tag League alongside Animal Warrior but failed to advance in the tournament. Muta successfully defended the title against The Gladiator in his first title defense on January 13, 2003. On January 19, Muto teamed with Goldberg to defeat KroniK in a tag team match, which led to KroniK being injured in the match and being forced to retire. On February 23, Muta lost the Triple Crown Heavyweight Championship to Shinya Hashimoto.

==== Various feuds and title reigns (2003–2008) ====
Shortly after his title loss, Muto entered the 2003 Champion Carnival, defeating John Tenta in the quarter-final but lost to Arashi in the semi-final. On June 8, Muto teamed with Arashi to participate in a tournament for the vacant World Tag Team Championship, which they won by defeating Gigantes and The Gladiator in the semi-final and Jimmy Yang and Satoshi Kojima in the final. On July 13, Muto failed to become the #1 contender for the Triple Crown Heavyweight Championship by losing to Toshiaki Kawada. After successfully defending the tag team titles, Muto and Arashi entered the Real World Tag League but they failed to advance in the tournament. On December 27, Muto made a return to the United States, wrestling for the Ring of Honor promotion as part of an interpromotional All Japan vs. ROH card, which hosted a series of cross-promotional "dream" matches. In the main event, Muto reverted to his Great Muta persona and teamed with Arashi to defeat Prophecy members Christopher Daniels and Dan Maff. Muto and Arashi finally lost the tag titles to Kaz Hayashi and Satoshi Kojima on January 18, 2004.

Muto would then support AJPW in its feud with Roughly Obsess and Destroy and spent most part of the fall of 2003 and 2004 by competing in several matches against RO&D members. Muto found success in 2004 by entering that year's Champion Carnival, which he won by defeating Takao Omori in the semi-final and Kensuke Sasaki in the final on April 20. Muto picked up a major win against Osamu Nishimura at Battle Banquet. In November, Muto teamed with Nishimura to participate in the 2004 Real World Tag League but could not advance in their block. In 2005, Muto defeated his pupil Hiroshi Tanahashi of NJPW at Realize. On July 26, Muto received a title shot against Satoshi Kojima for the Triple Crown Heavyweight Championship but failed to win the title. While continuing to feud with RO&D, Muto and his supporters from the AJPW roster also began feuding with the Voodoo Murders. In November, Muto teamed with Akebono as they entered the 2005 Real World Tag League, making it to the final against Team 3D, which they lost.

On March 10, 2006, Muto revived his Great Muta moniker as he unsuccessfully challenged Satoshi Kojima for the Triple Crown Heavyweight Championship. Muto failed in the 2006 Champion Carnival and continued his feud with Voodoo Murders throughout the year. At the end of the year, Muto was paired with Toshiaki Kawada in the 2006 Real World Tag League, where they tied Satoshi Kojima and Hiroyoshi Tenzan with eight points in the round robin stage, which led to a match between the two teams on December 2 to determine the final round opponents for the top-ranked team in the tournament, RO'Z and Suwama. Muto and Kawada lost their match. On December 15, Muto teamed with Kannazuki to defeat Hiroyoshi Tenzan and Akimasa Haraguchi to become the inaugural F-1 Tag Team Champions.

He made his British debut on January 12, 2007, wrestling for Real Quality Wrestling at the York Hall in Bethnal Green, London, England, where he defeated RQW Heavyweight Champion Martin Stone in a non-title match. On February 17, Muto competed as Great Muta for a special tag team match in which he teamed with Tajiri to defeat Goldustin and Hakushi. In March, Muto participated in the 2007 Champion Carnival, competing in Block A and finishing with 6 points total; Muto defeated Toshiaki Kawada in the finals on March 30, winning the tournament for a third time. At Pro-Wrestling Love In Yokohama, Muto unsuccessfully challenged Minoru Suzuki for the Triple Crown Heavyweight Championship.

In the fall of the year, Muto and his partner Joe Doering participated in the 2007 Real World Tag League, which they won by defeating Satoshi Kojima and Suwama in the final on December 9. This earned them a title shot for the World Tag Team Championship against Kojima and TARU on January 3, 2008, which Muto and Doering won. In April, Muto entered the 2008 Champion Carnival, winning only two matches and failing to advance in the round robin stage. Muto and Doering lost the World Tag Team Championship to Minoru Suzuki and Taiyo Kea after a five-month reign on June 28.

==== Dual world champion (2008–2009) ====
Muto had won the IWGP Heavyweight Championship in NJPW earlier in 2008 and successfully defended the title in All Japan against Hirooki Goto at Pro-Wrestling Love in Ryogoku Vol. 5. On September 29, Muto wrestled as The Great Muta as he defeated Suwama to capture the Triple Crown Heavyweight Championship for the third time, becoming only the second wrestler, after Satoshi Kojima, to hold the Triple Crown Heavyweight Championship and the IWGP Heavyweight Championship at the same time. Muta successfully defended the title against Minoru Suzuki at Pro-Wrestling Love in Ryogoku Vol. 6. Muto closed out the year with an unsuccessful stint in the 2008 Real World Tag League alongside Ryota Hama.

In 2009, Muto took part in a tournament for the vacant All Asia Tag Team Championship by teaming with Kaz Hayashi, defeating Ryota Hama and Shuji Kondo in the quarter-final before losing to Minoru Suzuki and Nosawa Rongai in the semi-final. On March 14, Muto defended his Triple Crown Heavyweight Championship against Yoshihiro Takayama. He bloodied him severely, as is his trademark, and even used the Shining Wizard to his opponent on the barricade. During the course of the match, however, his mask was ripped off, and he was bleeding profusely. Towards the end of the match, Takayama dominated Muta, but Muta reversed a kick into a Dragon Screw, and attempted to use the Asian Mist against him, but Takayama blocked it, and performed an Everest Suplex Pin on Muta, and won the match. Muta subsequently walked away in shock of what had happened.

Following the title loss, Muto participated in the 2009 Champion Carnival, where he won four out of five matches in his block, losing only to Kaz Hayashi. As a result, Muto advanced to the semi-final of the tournament, where he lost to Minoru Suzuki. Muto would spend the entire year representing All Japan in matches against Voodoo Murders, Tokyo Gurentai and F4. In November, Muto teamed with Masakatsu Funaki to participate in the 2009 Real World Tag League. The duo won the tournament by defeating Masayuki Kono and Suwama.

==== World Tag Team Champion (2010–2011) ====
The 2009 Real World Tag League win earned Muto and Masakatsu Funaki, a title match for the World Tag Team Championship against Minoru Suzuki and Taiyo Kea on January 3, 2010, which Muto and Funaki won. On January 30, Muto, under his Great Muta gimmick, made a special appearance for Pro Wrestling Guerrilla in Los Angeles, California, during the WrestleReunion 4 weekend, teaming up with Kai in a match, where they defeated the team of Joey Ryan and Scott Lost. On March 9, Muto and Funaki were forced to vacate the titles due to Muto going through a reconstructive knee surgery that kept him out of the ring for the rest of the year. Muto returned to All Japan as Great Muta at Pro-Wrestling Love in Ryogoku Vol.10 in August, where he lost to Kenso in a Tables, Ladders and Chairs match. On September 10, Muto faced his former tag team partner Masakatsu Funaki in a special return match, which ended in a thirty-minute time limit draw. On October 24, Muto unsuccessfully challenged Kaz Hayashi for the World Junior Heavyweight Championship. On December 12, Muto and Kannazuki lost the F-1 Tag Team Championship to Ryota Hama and Koriki Choshu after a four-year reign.

Muto would win the junior heavyweight and heavyweight battle royals at the Korakuen Hall on January 1 and 3, 2011, respectively. At Pro-Wrestling Love In Ryogoku Vol. 12, Muto and Kenso defeated SMOP (Akebono and Ryota Hama) to win the World Tag Team Championship, marking Muto's fifth and final reign with the title. At All Together, Muto teamed with Kenta Kobashi to defeat Takashi Iizuka and Toru Yano in a tag team match. On October 23, Muto and Kenso lost the World Tag Team Championship to Dark Cuervo and Dark Ozz, thus ending Muto's final championship reign in All Japan.

==== Final years and departure (2011–2013) ====
On June 7, 2011, Muto announced his resignation as the president of All Japan Pro Wrestling, remaining in the promotion as an active wrestler and a member of the Supervisory Board. Muto's decision stemmed from a real-life incident where Yoshikazu Taru assaulted Nobukazu Hirai backstage at an All Japan Pro Wrestling show, which led to Hirai suffering a stroke after competing in a match. Muto took the blame for the incident, which led to All Japan suspending not only Taru, but also Kazuhiko Masada, Masayuki Kono and Minoru Tanaka who were present when the attack took place. After being on the midcard and without a big feud for most of 2011, Muto became the main challenger for Noah's Jun Akiyama, who had won the Triple Crown Championship from Suwama. Muto reunited with Kenta Kobashi at All Together to defeat Akiyama and Takao Omori. Akiyama challenged Muto to a match for the title that took place on March 20, 2012, which Muto eventually lost.

On June 1, Muto returned to the United States to make an appearance for Pro Wrestling Syndicate (PWS) in Rahway, New Jersey, teaming with Kai to defeat Anthony Nese and Sami Callihan in a tag team match. In November 2012, Muto and his business partners sold all of their All Japan shares to the Speed Partners corporation for ¥200 million. On June 1, 2013, Speed Partners president Nobuo Shiraishi took over as the new president of All Japan, firing the previous president, Muto's longtime right-hand man Masayuki Uchida, in the process, which led to Muto resigning from the promotion, effective June 30, 2013.

=== New Japan Pro-Wrestling ===
==== 2004–2005 ====
Muto returned to NJPW as a member of the All Japan roster at Wrestling World on January 4, 2004, to team with Bob Sapp to defeat Cho-Ten. Muto next appeared at Pro-Wrestlers Be Strongest by teaming with Osamu Nishimura in a loss to Hiroshi Tanahashi and Shinsuke Nakamura. Muto would wrestle only one match for NJPW in 2005 at Nexess VI, where he defeated Ron Waterman.

==== 2007–2009 ====
He then appeared at Wrestle Kingdom I in 2007 where he reunited with former partner and rival Masahiro Chono to defeat Tencozy in a "Super Dream Tag match" pitting NJPW and AJPW wrestlers together.

On January 4, 2008, at Wrestle Kingdom II in Tokyo Dome, under the Great Muta persona, he defeated Hirooki Goto. On April 27, Muto defeated Shinsuke Nakamura to win his fourth IWGP Heavyweight Championship, this was his second appearance in 2008 for NJPW and he had not held the title for eight years and four months prior to the win. After retaining the title against Manabu Nakanishi and Togi Makabe, Muta defended the title against former champion Shinsuke Nakamura at Destruction on October 13 and retained following a Frankensteiner. He would lose the title to his former student Hiroshi Tanahashi at Wrestle Kingdom III on January 4, 2009, after Tanahashi used his signature High Fly Flow twice to get the pin. After the match, Muto said backstage that he had passed Tanahashi his sash after doing his best for over half a year to raise the worth of the title, and suggested that he would withdraw and leave New Japan to move their company forward. Muto would make his second appearance in NJPW on October 12 to commemorate Masahiro Chono's twenty-fifth year in professional wrestling as Muto teamed with Chono and Kenta Kobashi to defeat Jun Akiyama, Manabu Nakanishi and Satoshi Kojima in a six-man tag team match.

==== 2012–2014 ====
On January 4, 2012, Muto made a return to New Japan at Wrestle Kingdom VI in Tokyo Dome, where he defeated Tetsuya Naito in a singles match. A year later at Wrestle Kingdom 7 in Tokyo Dome, Muto teamed with Shinjiro Otani, a replacement for an injured Daichi Hashimoto, in a tag team match, where they were defeated by Hiroyoshi Tenzan and Satoshi Kojima. Muto returned to New Japan again a year later at Wrestle Kingdom 8 in Tokyo Dome, now working as The Great Muta in a tag team match, where he and Toru Yano defeated Suzuki-gun (Minoru Suzuki and Shelton X Benjamin). As the only face in the match, Muta turned on Yano towards the end of the match, but his green mist accidentally hit Suzuki instead, leading to Yano pinning him for the win.

==== 2019–2023 ====
Muto, in his Great Muta persona, was the last entrant in the Honor Rumble at the G1 Supercard Show on April 6, 2019. This marked his first appearance for the promotion in 5 years. On February 19, 2020, Muto made an appearance at the Tiger Hattori Retirement Show, appearing alongside fellow NJPW alumni Riki Choshu, The Great Kabuki, and Hiroshi Hase.

On January 8, 2022, at Wrestle Kingdom 16, Muto teamed with Kaito Kiyomiya in a losing effort against Kazuchika Okada and Hiroshi Tanahashi during the event's main event match. On November 20, Muto, in his Great Muta persona, competed in his penultimate NJPW match at the Historic X-Over event. At the event, Muta teamed with Chaos (Kazuchika Okada and Toru Yano) to defeat United Empire (Great-O-Khan, Jeff Cobb, and Aaron Henare). On January 4, 2023, at Wrestle Kingdom 17 night 1, Muto competed in his final NJPW match, teaming with Hiroshi Tanahashi and Shota Umino to defeat Los Ingobernables de Japon (Tetsuya Naito, Sanada and Bushi). Muto appeared at night 2 of Wrestle Kingdom 17, challenging Naito to a retirement match as part of Noah's Keiji Muto Grand Final Pro-Wrestling "Last-Love" event.

=== Total Nonstop Action Wrestling (2007, 2009) ===
In 2007, while Muto was in Orlando, Florida, in order to establish a working agreement between All Japan and Total Nonstop Action Wrestling (TNA), he made an appearance for the company, under his Great Muta gimmick, at the Destination X pay-per-view, in a segment with Christian Cage. In February 2009 Muto was featured in multiple interview segments, taped in Japan, where he spoke of his student Akira Raijin, who had just begun working for TNA.

=== Wrestle-1 (2013–2020) ===
On July 10, 2013, Muto announced the foundation of a promotion named Wrestle-1, bringing over many of the former wrestlers of All Japan Pro-Wrestling that left in June. At the promotion's inaugural event on September 8, Muto teamed with Bob Sapp in a main event tag team match, where they defeated René Duprée and Zodiac. During Wrestle-1's secondshow on September 15, Muto made his first Japanese appearance as The Great Muta in two years, when he and Tajiri defeated Duprée and Zodiac in a tag team match. On October 18, Muto announced his semi-retirement, saying that in the future he would only work Wrestle-1's larger events. On March 2, 2014, Muto put his career on the line at Kaisen: Outbreak, Wrestle-1's first event in Ryōgoku Kokugikan. Muto teamed with Rob Terry and the debuting Taiyō Kea in a six-man tag team match, where they defeated Masayuki Kono, René Duprée and Samoa Joe, thus saving his career. Through Wrestle-1's working relationship with TNA, Muto, working under his Great Muta persona, returned to the American promotion on March 9 at Lockdown, where he, Sanada and Yasu defeated Chris Sabin, Christopher Daniels and Kazarian in a six-man tag team steel cage match. Muta returned to TNA on the July 25, 2014, defeating Robbie E at an Impact Wrestling taping in New York City. After the match, Sanada turned on Muta. This led to a match at Wrestle-1's Shōgeki: Impact event on July 6, where The Great Muta defeated Sanada in a main event singles match. On September 22, Muto suffered his first direct loss since March 2012, when he was submitted by Masayuki Kono in a four-on-three handicap match, where he and the Novus stable (Jiro Kuroshio, Koji Doi and Rionne Fujiwara) faced the Desperado stable (Kono, Kazma Sakamoto and Ryoji Sai). On October 12, Muto, as the Great Muta, worked TNA's Bound for Glory event in Tokyo, teaming with Tajiri in a tag team main event, where they defeated James Storm and The Great Sanada. On November 1, during an event celebrating his 30th anniversary in professional wrestling, Muto defeated Masayuki Kono to become the second Wrestle-1 Champion. He made his first successful title defense on December 22 against Seiya Sanada. His second defense took place on January 30, 2015, when he defeated Manabu Soya. On February 16, Muto, as the Great Muta, returned to TNA, defeating Mr. Anderson as part of Global Impact: USA vs The World. On March 8, Muto lost the Wrestle-1 Championship to Kai in his third defense. On March 27, 2017, Muto announced he was stepping down as the president of Wrestle-1 with Kaz Hayashi taking over the position. Muto remained with the promotion as its representative director. On June 8, 2019, Muto returned to Impact Wrestling, wrestling as The Great Muta in the main event of their A Night You Can't Mist event in a tag team match where he teamed with Tommy Dreamer to defeat Michael Elgin and Johnny Impact. On April 1, 2020, at Wrestle-1's final event, Muto team with Kaz Hayashi, Masayuki Kono, and Shuji Kondo unsuccessfully against Kuma Arashi, Shotaro Ashino, Daiki Inaba, and Koji Doi.

=== Total Nonstop Action Wrestling (2014–2015, 2019) ===
On March 2, 2014, at TNA Global Impact Japan, Muto, under his Great Muta persona, teamed with Rob Terry and Taiyō Kea to defeat Masayuki Kono, René Duprée and Samoa Joe in a six-man tag team match. Later in March, through Wrestle-1's working relationship with TNA, Muto, working under his Great Muta persona, returned to America, at Lockdown, where he, Sanada and Yasu defeated Chris Sabin, Christopher Daniels and Kazarian in a six-man tag team steel cage match.

Muta returned to TNA on the July 25, 2014, defeating Robbie E at an Impact Wrestling taping in New York City. After the match, Sanada turned on Muta. This led to a match at Wrestle-1's Shōgeki: Impact event on July 6, where The Great Muta defeated Sanada in a main event singles match. On October 12, the blow-off of the Muta-Sanada feud occurred at Bound for Glory in Tokyo, where Muta teamed with Tajiri in a tag team main event to defeat James Storm and The Great Sanada. On February 16, 2015, Muto, as the Great Muta, returned to TNA, defeating Mr. Anderson as part of Global Impact – USA vs. The World.

On June 8, 2019, Muto returned to TNA, now renamed Impact Wrestling, wrestling as The Great Muta in the main event of their A Night You Can't Mist event in a tag team match where he teamed with Tommy Dreamer to defeat Michael Elgin and Johnny Impact.

=== All Elite Wrestling (2019, 2022) ===
On November 9, 2019, Muto made a surprise special appearance at All Elite Wrestling's Full Gear as one of the judges for the AEW World Championship match, in the event of a draw.

On September 23, 2022, he made a surprise appearance at AEW Rampage: Grand Slam, saving Sting from The House of Black.

=== Pro Wrestling Noah (2020–2023) ===
On February 12, 2021, Muto successfully won the GHC Heavyweight Championship in a match against Go Shiozaki at Pro Wrestling Noah's Destination 2021 event in Nippon Budokan. On March 14, he made his first successful title defense, defeating Kaito Kiyomiya at the Noah: Great Voyage 2021. He made another successful defense against Masa Kitamiya on April 29 at Noah: The Glory 2021. On June 6, at CyberFight Festival, Muto lost the title to Naomichi Marufuji.

On June 12, 2022, at CyberFight Festival 2022, Muto announced his intention to retire from professional wrestling in 2023. On October 30, it was announced that Shinsuke Nakamura (while still under a WWE contract) would be Muto's opponent for the Noah The New Year show on January 1, 2023. At the event, Nakamura defeated Muto, who was wrestling under his Great Muta persona.

On January 22, 2023, at The Great Muta Final "Bye-Bye", Muto wrestled his last match under his Great Muta persona, teaming with Sting and Darby Allin to defeat Hakushi, Akira and Naomichi Marufuji. On February 21, Muto wrestled the final full match of his professional wrestling career, losing to Tetsuya Naito at the Keiji Muto Grand Final Pro-Wrestling "Last-Love" event. After the match Muto challenged Masahiro Chono, who was on commentary for the match with Naito and hadn't wrestled a match in 9 years, to an impromptu final match, which Chono won by submission, the opposite result from their common debut nearly 39 years before.

On March 15, 2023, The Great Muta was announced as the second individual inductee for the WWE Hall of Fame Class of 2023. At the ceremony, Muta was inducted by Ric Flair.

== Professional wrestling style and persona ==
Muto frequently wrestled under two ring names: the first as Keiji Muto and the second, The Great Muta. Muto innovated the Muta Lock, named after him, and the Shining Wizard. He is also known for using the Figure-four leglock and the Moonsault as finishing moves as well as the Asian mist.

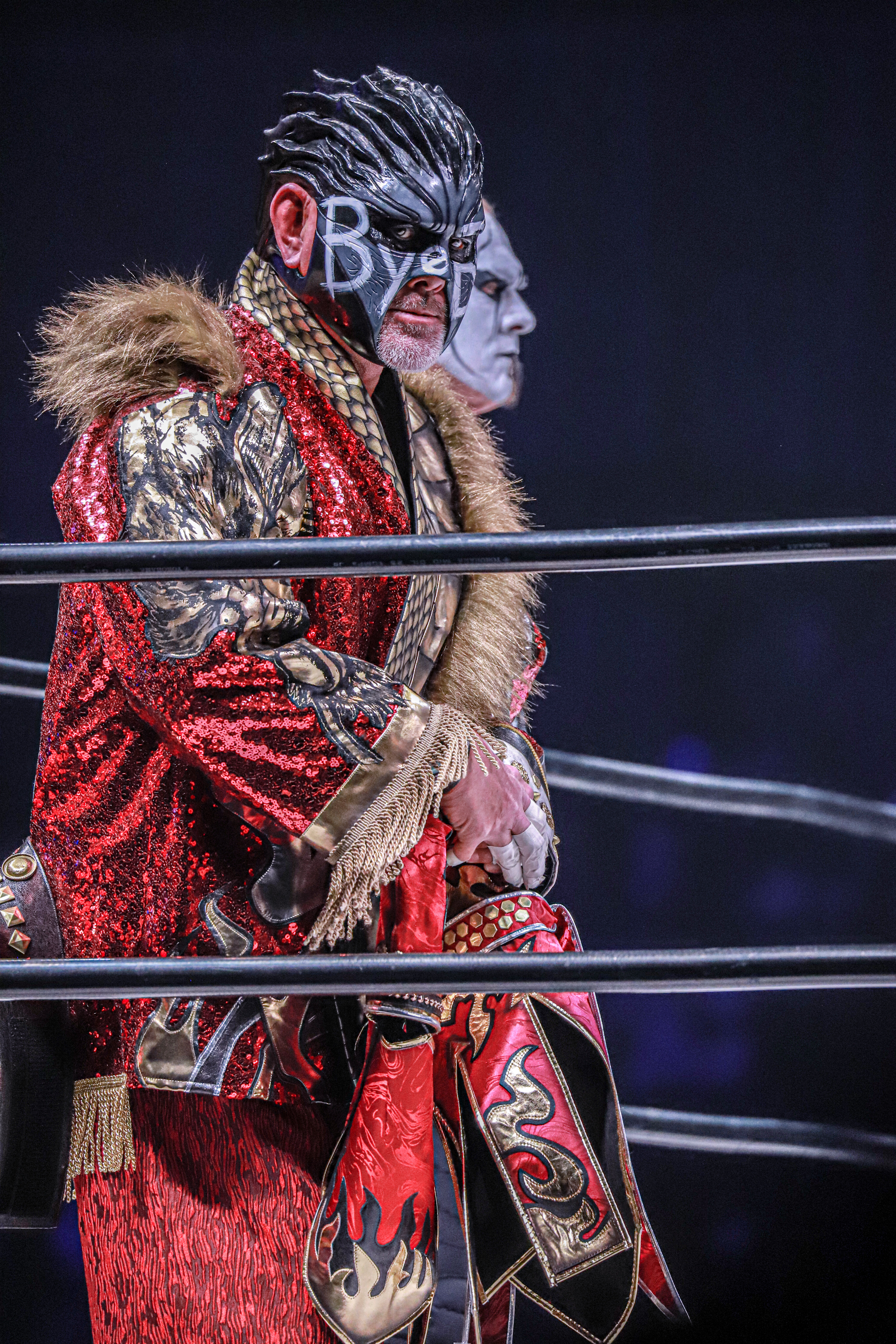
Muto as The Great Muta at The Great Muta Final "Bye-Bye"

The Great Muta is Muto's best-known gimmick, which he has wrestled as often throughout his career, switching back and forth between this alter ego and his real name since March 1989. He was originally billed as the son of Japanese wrestler Great Kabuki (unrelated in real life), who used a similar gimmick, but the connection is rarely mentioned nowadays. Like his father, Great Muta is a mysterious, manifestly supernatural character who distinguishes himself through his macabre looks and magical skills. His appearance is highlighted by his lavish, exotical entrance costumes, which are taken off to reveal a horrifically painted face, later replaced by an organic-looking mask after Muto shaved his head. Muta uses Muto's moveset with little variation (his version of the Shining Wizard is named Senkou Youjutsu ("Flash Magic") instead), though Muta tends to be much more aggressive and utilizes more weapons. Muta can also spit green or red mist and plays mind games to distract his opponents. The Great Muta is the gimmick most fans in the United States know Muto for, as he wrestled as The Great Muta throughout the late 1980s and early 1990s for the NWA, and in his later stints in World Championship Wrestling.

The gimmick was deeply expanded during the 2000s in the promotion Hustle, where he appeared in a storyline in which he gained a son in the form of The Great Bono (played by Muta's wrestling trainee Akebono), forming a tag team reminiscence of Muta's team with his own father Great Kabuki. Some of those elements were later used in All Japan Pro Wrestling as well. In November 2023, Pro Wrestling Noah introduced Muta's storyline daughter, Great Sakuya.

Other portrayers of the Great Muta character were:

- Troy Endres (2002–2003): Endres, a professional wrestler and mixed martial artist, briefly used the Great Muta gimmick in New Japan Pro-Wrestling from 2002 to 2003. Endres died on August 3, 2014, at age 46.
- Johnny Stamboli (2004–2005): After being released by WWE, Stamboli worked for All Japan Pro Wrestling as the Great Muta from 2004 to 2005, where he feuded with Muto. In his penultimate match under the gimmick on December 5, 2004, Stamboli, as the Great Muta, lost a match to Muto's version of the character. In 2007, Stamboli began portraying a new character "Rellik" ("killer" spelled backwards) in TNA, which was based on the Great Muta gimmick.

Kokushi-Muso, a gimmick used on special occasions, is a play-off of Jinsei Shinzaki's mystic character Hakushi. Muto debuted it in Michinoku Pro Wrestling in 2001, but it later migrated with him to All Japan Pro Wrestling, where he used it when teaming with Shinzaki. Kokushi means "Black Master" in the same line Hakushi means "White Master", while Muso means "Unparalleled"; together, they are a pun with the kokushi musou Japanese Mahjong yaku. Like Hakushi, Kokushi is characterized for sporting Buddhist shakyo painted all over his body, though interspersed with English phrases like Muto's motto "Puroresu Love", and wearing black garments instead of white. Similarly, he uses wrestling moves associated with Hakushi while at the same time retaining mannerisms and moves used by The Great Muta. He finally completes it with Buddhist monk paraphernalia like carrying an ojuzu and meditating in the ring.

White Ninja, a Japanese ninja gimmick, was used in Championship Wrestling from Florida between November 1985 and October 1986.

Super Black Ninja, a gimmick similar to that of the White Ninja, was used in World Class Championship Wrestling in Texas and also was used in the World Wrestling Council in Puerto Rico, between January 1988 and March 1989. This was Muto's first gimmick to sport face paint.

Space Lone Wolf, a space-age type character, was used in New Japan between October 1986 and December 1987. Space Lone Wolf's entrance attire would feature the numbers "610" which means "Muto" in Japanese numerics. Muto had also stated that NJPW founder Antonio Inoki insisted on wearing a helmet to the ring in order to attract sponsorship from a Japanese motorcycle helmet manufacturer.

== Other media ==
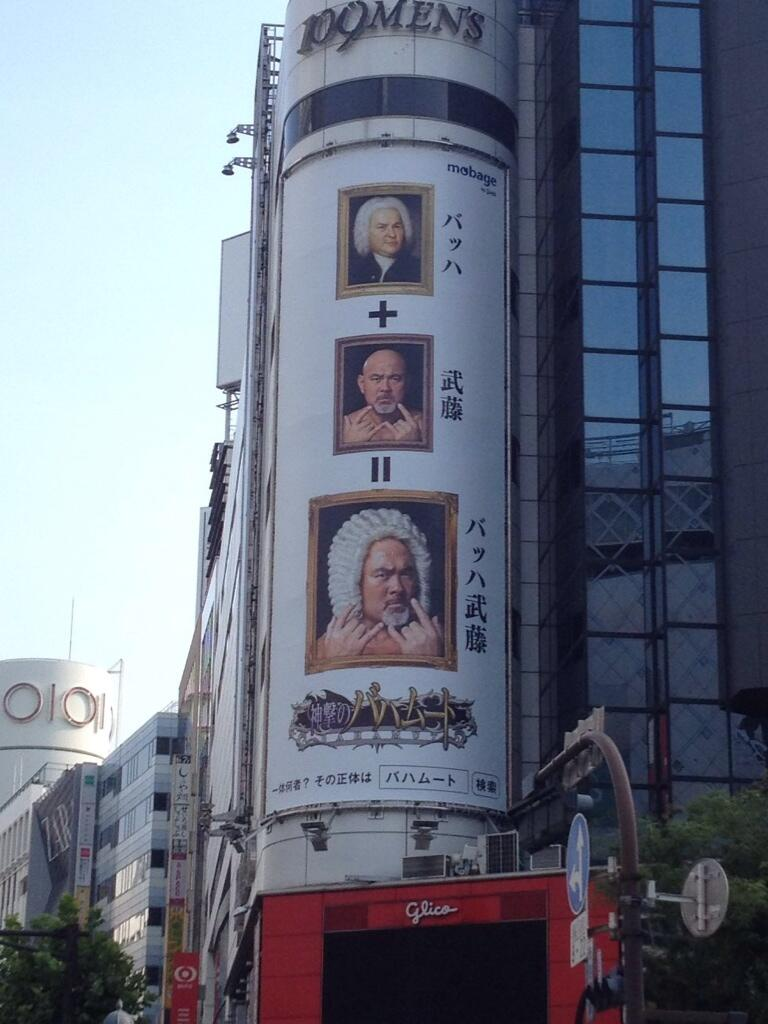
A billboard of Muto as Bahamutō in 2013, ran as an advertising campaign for Shingeki no Bahamut

Muto has appeared in a vast number of media appearances in Japan, including many commercials and films. Muto was interviewed for wrestling documentary Bloodstained Memoirs.

In 1991, he made his video game debut in New Japan Pro-Wrestling: The Three Musketeers for the Game Boy handheld system in Japan.

In 1995, Muto starred in the Japanese thriller Yajuu Densetsu: Dragon Blue, as Ryusaki, a suave detective who joins forces with a beautiful young spiritualist named Mazuki (played by Hiroko Tanaka) to solve a bizarre case of killings from a mystical sea creature.

In 2000, he appeared in the video game Virtual Pro Wrestling 2.

In 2004, he played the role of Harold Sakata in the movie Rikidōzan, a film based on the real-life story of a wrestler who would eventually be known as the "Father of Puroresu"; Harold Sakata took Rikidozan under his wing and introduced him into the world of professional wrestling.

In 2006, he appeared as a guest star in the Japanese historical drama series Saiyūki, playing a village headman who is helped by Son Gokū (played by Shingo Katori).

Muto has worked extensively with Japanese clothing company A Bathing Ape, helping them to produce a number of t-shirts featuring his likeness and the All Japan Pro Wrestling logo. Muto was also responsible for organizing Bapesta Pro Wrestling, a previously annual wrestling event sponsored and promoted by Bape.

Muto appears as a gang member in the 2017 video game Yakuza Kiwami 2, alongside Genichiro Tenryu, Masahiro Chono, Riki Choshu and Tatsumi Fujinami.

In 2024 Muto was added to WWE 2K24 as part of the WCW pack DLC.

== Personal life ==
In 1992, Muto married his wife, Hisae Ashida. Together they have two children.

Outside of professional wrestling, Muto also owns a yakiniku restaurant, opened in 2015, called "Yakiniku Dining 610" (焼肉Dining 610) which was inspired by Muto's early "Space Lone Wolf" gimmick. In Japanese, the numbers 610 (which were featured on Lone Wolf's entrance attire) can be read as "Muto", lit. translated as "Six-Ten".

== Championships and accomplishments ==
- All Japan Pro Wrestling
  - F-1 Tag Team Championship (1 time) – with Kannazuki (Note: Championship not officially recognized by All Japan Pro Wrestling.)
  - Triple Crown Heavyweight Championship (3 times)
  - World Tag Team Championship (5 times) – with Taiyō Kea (1), Arashi (1), Joe Doering (1), Masakatsu Funaki (1) and Kenso (1)
  - Akiho Yoshizawa Cup (2010) – with Masakatsu Funaki and S1 Mask
  - Champion Carnival (2002, 2004, 2007)
  - Giant Baba Six Man Cup (2002) – with George Hines and Kaz Hayashi
  - January 2 Korakuen Hall Heavyweight Battle Royal (2011)
  - January 3 Korakuen Hall Junior Heavyweight Battle Royal (2011)
  - World's Strongest Tag Determination League (2001) – with Taiyō Kea
  - World's Strongest Tag Determination League (2007) – with Joe Doering
  - World's Strongest Tag Determination League (2009) – with Masakatsu Funaki
- Championship Wrestling from Florida
  - NWA Florida Heavyweight Championship (1 time)
- Continental Wrestling Federation
  - NWA Southeastern United States Junior Heavyweight Championship (1 time) (Note: Championship reign not officially recognized due to outside interference.)
- International Professional Wrestling Hall of Fame
  - Class of 2023
- New Japan Pro-Wrestling
  - IWGP Heavyweight Championship (4 times)
  - IWGP Tag Team Championship (6 times) – with Shiro Koshinaka (1), Masahiro Chono (2), Hiroshi Hase (2) and Taiyō Kea (1)
  - NWA Worlds Heavyweight Championship (1 time)
  - Greatest 18 Championship (1 time, final)
  - G1 Climax (1995)
  - Super Grade Tag League/G1 Tag League (1993, 1994) – with Hiroshi Hase
  - G1 Tag League (1997) – with Masahiro Chono
  - G1 Tag League (1998) – with Satoshi Kojima
  - G1 Tag League (1999) – with Scott Norton
  - MVP Award (2001)
  - Singles Best Bout (2001) vs. Yuji Nagata on August 12
  - Tag Team Best Bout (2001) with Hiroshi Hase vs. Jun Akiyama and Yuji Nagata on October 8
- Nikkan Sports
  - Match of the Year (1999) vs. Genichiro Tenryu on May 3
  - Match of the Year (2001) with Hiroshi Hase vs. Yuji Nagata & Jun Akiyama on October 8
  - Outstanding Performance Award (1998)
  - Tag Team of the Year (2009) with Masakatsu Funaki
  - Technique Award (1997)
  - Wrestler of the Year (1999, 2001, 2008)
- Pro Wrestling Illustrated
  - PWI ranked him No. 3 of the 500 best singles wrestlers in the PWI 500 in 2002
  - PWI ranked him No. 25 of the top 500 singles wrestlers of the PWI Years in 2003
- Pro Wrestling Noah
  - GHC Heavyweight Championship (1 time)
  - GHC Tag Team Championship (1 time) – with Naomichi Marufuji
- Tokyo Sports
  - Best Bout Award (2021) vs. Go Shiozaki (February 12 at Destination 2021: Back to Budokan)
  - Best Bout Award (2023) vs. Shinsuke Nakamura at Keiji Muto Grand Final Pro-Wrestling "Last" Love
  - Match of the Year (1999) with Genichiro Tenryu on May 3, 1999
  - Match of the Year (2011) with Kenta Kobashi vs. Takashi Iizuka and Toru Yano (August 27 at All Together)
  - Outstanding Performance Award (1998)
  - Rookie of the Year (1986)
  - Special Award (1989)
  - Tag Team of the Year (1990) with Masahiro Chono
  - Tag Team of the Year (2005) with Akebono
  - Wrestler of the Year (1995, 1999, 2001, 2008)
- Total Nonstop Action Wrestling
  - Global Impact Tournament (2015) – with Team International (Angelina Love, Bram, Drew Galloway, The Great Sanada, Khoya, Magnus, Rockstar Spud, Sonjay Dutt and Tigre Uno)
- World Championship Wrestling
  - NWA World Television Championship (1 time)
  - WCW World Tag Team Championship (1 time) – with Vampiro
  - BattleBowl (1992)
- World Wrestling Council
  - WWC Puerto Rico Heavyweight Championship (1 time)
  - WWC World Television Championship (1 time)
- Wrestle-1
  - Wrestle-1 Championship (1 time)
  - F-1 Tag Team Championship (1 time) – with Kannazuki
- Wrestling Observer Newsletter
  - Best Wrestling Maneuver (2001) Shining Wizard
  - Match of the Year (2001) vs. Genichiro Tenryu on June 8, Tokyo, Japan
  - Most Improved Wrestler (2001)
  - Wrestler of the Year (2001)
  - Readers' Favorite Wrestler (2001)
  - Wrestling Observer Newsletter Hall of Fame (Class of 1999)
- WWE
  - WWE Hall of Fame (Class of 2023)
- Other achievements
  - Bahamut Championship (1 time) – with Sugi-chan
