= Makoto Izubuchi =

Japanese comedian, professional wrestler and tarento

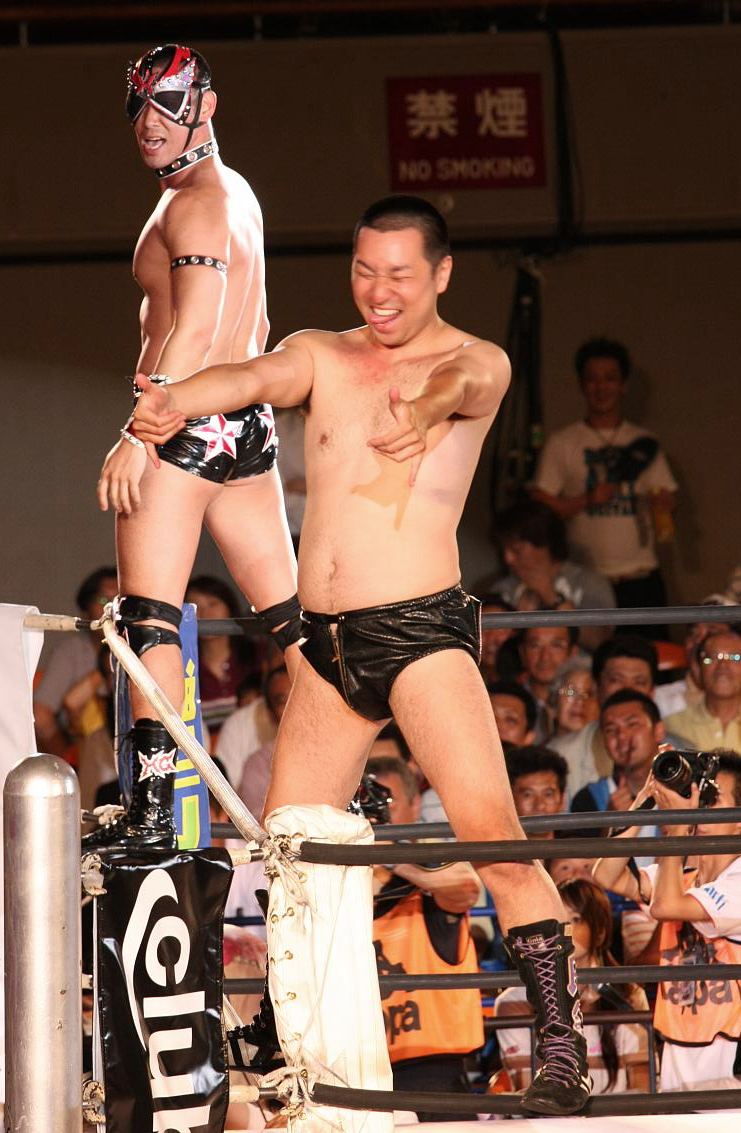
- Born: June 9, 1974 (age 52); Tamana, Kumamoto Prefecture, Japan
- Occupations: Comedian, Wrestler

Makoto Izubuchi (出渕 誠, Izubuchi Makoto) (born June 9, 1974) is a Japanese comedian, professional wrestler and tarento ("talent") better known for his performing name of Razor Ramon Real Gay (レイザーラモンRG, Reizā Ramon RG; occasionally RG, Razor Ramon Izubuchi, Real Gay, or simply Makoto), which he adopted from his comedy partner Razor Ramon Hard Gay. He is better known for his work in Hustle and TV appearances.

== Professional wrestling career ==
While at college, Izubuchi pic wrestling as a hobby and then joined the Doshisha Professional Wrestling Alliance (DWA). Along with his longtime friend Masaki "GiveUp" Sumitani, Izubuchin joined the tag team championship co-hosted by DWA and the Ritsumeikan Wrestling Alliance (RWA) of nearby Ritsumeikan University in Kyoto. Current New Japan Pro-Wrestling member Hiroshi Tanahashi was also a participant of these events.

In 2006, Izubuchi debuted in the pro wrestling promotion Hustle, where Sumitani was working as his character Razor Ramon Hard Gay. Izubuchi first appeared in Hustle auditions as a Hard Gay parody before renaming himself Razor Ramon Real Gay. His gimmick was similar to Hard Gay's, but adding a rastafari wig and a characteristic dance during his entrance. Initially working as Hustle's unpopular general manager along with Hiroko Suzuki, Real Gay was challenged by Monster Army member Kenzo Suzuki, Hiroko's husband, who stipulated that if he was the winner, she would be appointed the only GM. Unfortunately for RG, he was squashed by Suzuki and lost his job. RG then became a regular wrestler for the Hustle Army, but he proved to be a comically weak contender and spent his early years being brutally beaten by each opponent he faced. Despite his losses, his never-say-die attitude and charisma made turned him into a favorite among Hustle fans. He used a humorous wrestling style, wearing a red fundoshi under his tights (which he would display to perform his signature stink face) and selling exaggeratedly whenever he received an atomic drop. He formed a tag team with Hard Gay, which resembled their old manzai duo.

== Comedy ==
Izubuchi met Masaki Sumitani while they were both in college wrestling. The duo would later form the comedy duo "Razor Ramon"; the name was inspired by the character portrayed by professional wrestler Scott Hall in 1997. During their college years, Razor Ramon won the Fukuwarai award in the Imamiya Kids' Ebisu Manzai Contest and gained experience on the stage through the audition live performance SABUKI at 2chome-gekijo, an Osaka comedy club opened by the Yoshimoto Kogyo comedy troupe at which many comedians from the Kansai area start their career.

Years after, he reunited with Sumitani and officially joined Yoshimoto Kogyo. Razor Ramon made their TV debut in 1999 and won the Judges Special Award in the ABC Owarai (Comedy) Grand-Prix in 2000. Both Sumitani and Izubuchi joined the Yoshimoto Kogyo-produced program Yoshimoto Shin-kigeki in 2001, often playing yakuza, salaryman, udon restaurant owners, construction workers, and others.

== Championships and accomplishments ==
- All Japan Pro Wrestling
  - F-1 Tag Team Championship (1 time) - with Manabu Soya^{1}

^{1}Championship not officially recognized by All Japan Pro Wrestling.

== Film ==
Year	Title	Role	Notes
2010	Farewell, Beloved President		
2016	Gantz: O	Nobuo Muroya	
2015	Uchu Sentai Kyuranger the Movie: Geth Indaver Strikes Back	Kaal Indaver	
