= Kannazuki (comedian) =

Japanese comedian

- 神奈月
- Born: Satoshi Okumura; 3 November 1965 (age 60); Toki, Gifu Prefecture, Japan
- Occupation: Comedian
- Years active: 1987-present
- Agent: Ōta Productions
- Height: 1.73 m (5 ft 8 in)
- Website: coron-kannazuki.com

Satoshi Okumura (奥村 聡司, Okumura Satoshi; born 3 November 1965), better known by his stage name Kannazuki (神奈月), is a Japanese comedian who specializes in impersonations of sportspeople.

== Biography ==
Okumura was born in Gifu Prefecture on 3 November 1965.
