= List of major Pro Wrestling Noah events =

List of pay-per-view events produced by Pro Wrestling Noah

Pro Wrestling Noah is a Japanese professional wrestling promotion founded in 2000. During the years, the promotion has held various notable pay-per-view events which feature professional wrestling matches that resulted from scripted storylines, where wrestlers portrayed villains, heroes, or less distinguishable characters in the scripted events that built tension and culminated in a wrestling match or series of matches.

== Annual tournaments ==
Tournament	Latest winner(s)	Date won
N-1 Victory	Kaito Kiyomiya	September 1, 2024
Victory Challenge Tag League	Kaito Kiyomiya and Ryohei Oiwa	March 10, 2024
Global Junior Heavyweight League	Daisuke Harada	January 30, 2020
Global Junior Heavyweight Tag League	Kotaro Suzuki and Yoshinari Ogawa	June 13, 2019

== Past events ==
=== 2004 ===
Event	Date	Location	Venue	Main event	Ref
Departure	July 10, 2004	Tokyo, Japan	Tokyo Dome	Kenta Kobashi (c) vs. Jun Akiyama for the GHC Heavyweight Championship	
(c) – refers to the champion(s) heading into the match

=== 2005 ===
Event	Date	Location	Venue	Main event	Ref
Destiny	July 18, 2005	Tokyo, Japan	Tokyo Dome	Mitsuharu Misawa vs. Toshiaki Kawada	
(c) – refers to the champion(s) heading into the match

=== 2013 ===
Event	Date	Location	Venue	Main event	Notes	Ref
Final Burning in Budokan	May 11	Tokyo, Japan	Nippon Budokan	Jun Akiyama, Keiji Mutoh, Kensuke Sasaki and Kenta Kobashi vs. Go Shiozaki, Kenta, Maybach Taniguchi and Yoshinobu Kanemaru		
Border Wars	May 12	Toronto, Ontario, Canada	Ted Reeve Arena	Kevin Steen (c) vs. El Generico in a Ladder War IV match for the ROH World Championship	Co-produced with Ring of Honor	
(c) – refers to the champion(s) heading into the match

=== 2021 ===
Event	Date	Location	Venue	Main event	Ref
Destination 2021 ~ Back to the Budokan	February 12, 2021	Tokyo, Japan	Nippon Budokan	Go Shiozaki (c) vs. Keiji Muto for the GHC Heavyweight Championship	
The Infinity 2021	March 21, 2021	Tokyo, Japan	Korakuen Hall	Kenoh (c) vs. Kazuyuki Fujita for the GHC National Championship	
The Glory 2021	April 29, 2021	Nagoya, Aichi, Japan	Nagoya Congress Center	Keiji Muto (c) vs. Masa Kitamiya for the GHC Heavyweight Championship	
Mitsuharu Misawa Memorial 2021	May 31, 2021	Tokyo, Japan	Korakuen Hall	M's Alliance (Keiji Muto and Masato Tanaka) vs. M's Alliance (Masakatsu Funaki and Naomichi Marufuji)	
CyberFight Festival	June 6, 2021	Saitama, Japan	Saitama Super Arena	Keiji Mutoh (c) vs. Naomichi Marufuji for the GHC Heavyweight Championship	
Cross Over in Sendai 2021	July 11, 2021	Sendai, Miyagi, Japan	Sendai Sun Plaza	Naomichi Marufuji (c) vs. Takashi Sugiura for the GHC Heavyweight Championship	
Cross Over in Hiroshima	August 1, 2021	Hiroshima, Japan	Hiroshima Sun Plaza	Naomichi Marufuji (c) vs. Kazushi Sakuraba for the GHC Heavyweight Championship	
Grand Square 2021	October 10, 2021	Osaka, Japan	Edion Arena Osaka	Naomichi Marufuji (c) vs. Katsuhiko Nakajima for the GHC Heavyweight Championship	
Demolition Stage	November 13, 2021	Yokohama, Kanagawa, Japan	Yokohama Budokan	Kaito Kiyomiya and Masa Kitamiya (c) vs. M's Alliance (Keiji Muto and Naomichi Marufuji) for the GHC Tag Team Championship	
The Best	November 28, 2021	Tokyo, Japan	Yoyogi National Gymnasium	Katsuhiko Nakajima (Heavyweight) vs. Kenoh (National) for the GHC Heavyweight Championship and GHC National Championship	
(c) – refers to the champion(s) heading into the match

=== 2022 ===
Event	Date	Location	Venue	Main event	Ref
The New Year	January 1, 2022	Tokyo, Japan	Nippon Budokan	Katsuhiko Nakajima (c) vs. Go Shiozaki for the GHC Heavyweight Championship	
Bumper Crop in Sendai	January 16, 2022	Sendai, Japan	Sendai Sun Plaza	Katsuhiko Nakajima (c) vs. Masa Kitamiya for the GHC Heavyweight Championship	
Higher Ground 2022	January 22, 2022	Osaka, Japan	Edion Arena Osaka	Kenoh (c) vs. Masakatsu Funaki for the GHC National Championship	
Gain Control In Nagoya	February 23, 2022	Nagoya, Japan	Fukuoka Convention Center	Katsuhiko Nakajima (c) vs. Kazuyuki Fujita for the GHC Heavyweight Championship	
Great Voyage in Fukuoka	March 21, 2022	Fukuoka, Japan	Fukuoka Convention Center	Kazuyuki Fujita (c) vs. Masato Tanaka for the GHC Heavyweight Championship	
Majestic	April 29, 2022	Tokyo, Japan	Ryogoku Kokugikan	Eita (c) vs. Hayata for the GHC Junior Heavyweight Championship	
Majestic	April 30, 2022	Tokyo, Japan	Ryogoku Kokugikan	Go Shiozaki vs. Kaito Kiyomiya for the vacant GHC Heavyweight Championship	
Dream On Final	May 21, 2022	Tokyo, Japan	Ota City General Gymnasium	Go Shiozaki, Kaito Kiyomiya and Masato Tanaka vs. M's Alliance (Keiji Muto and Naomichi Marufuji) and Satoshi Kojima	
CyberFight Festival	June 12, 2022	Saitama, Japan	Saitama Super Arena	Go Shiozaki (c) vs. Satoshi Kojima for the GHC Heavyweight Championship	
Destination	July 16, 2022	Tokyo, Japan	Nippon Budokan	Satoshi Kojima (c) vs. Kenoh for the GHC Heavyweight Championship	
Departure	August 5, 2022	Tokyo, Japan	Korakuen Hall	Hayata (c) vs. Shuji Kondo for the GHC Junior Heavyweight Championship	
Grand Ship In Nagoya	September 25, 2022	Nagoya, Japan	Aichi Prefectural Gymnasium	Kenoh (c) vs. Kaito Kiyomiya for the GHC Heavyweight Championship	
Ariake Triumph	October 30, 2022	Tokyo, Japan	Ariake Arena	Kaito Kiyomiya (c) vs. Kazuyuki Fujita for the GHC Heavyweight Championship	
Global Honored Crown	November 10, 2022	Tokyo, Japan	Korakuen Hall	Kaito Kiyomiya (c) vs. Timothy Thatcher for the GHC Heavyweight Championship	
The Best	November 23, 2022	Tokyo, Japan	Yoyogi National Gymnasium	El Hijo del Dr. Wagner Jr. (c) vs. Yoshiki Inamura for the GHC National Championship	
N Innovation	December 23, 2022	Tokyo, Japan	Shinjuku Face	Dante Leon (c) vs. Amakusa for the GHC Junior Heavyweight Championship	
(c) – refers to the champion(s) heading into the match

=== 2023 ===
Event	Date	Location	Venue	Main event	Ref
The New Year	January 1, 2023	Tokyo, Japan	Nippon Budokan	The Great Muta vs. Shinsuke Nakamura	
The Great Muta Final "Bye-Bye"	January 22, 2023	Yokohama, Japan	Yokohama Arena	The Great Muta, Sting and Darby Allin (with The Great Kabuki) vs. Hakushi, Akira and Naomichi Marufuji	
Star Navigation (Night 1)	February 5, 2023	Tokyo, Japan	Korakuen Hall	El Hijo de Dr. Wagner Jr. (c) vs. Manabu Soya for the GHC National Championship	
Great Voyage in Osaka	February 12, 2023	Osaka, Japan	Osaka Prefectural Gymnasium	Kaito Kiyomiya (c) vs. Jack Morris for the GHC Heavyweight Championship	
Keiji Muto Grand Final Pro-Wrestling "Last-Love"	February 21, 2023	Tokyo, Japan	Tokyo Dome	Keiji Muto vs. Tetsuya Naito	
Star Navigation (Night 2)	March 9, 2023	Tokyo, Japan	Korakuen Hall	Amakusa (c) vs. Hi69 for the GHC Junior Heavyweight Championship	
Great Voyage in Yokohama	March 19, 2023	Yokohama, Japan	Yokohama Budokan	Kaito Kiyomiya (c) vs. Jake Lee for the GHC Heavyweight Championship	
Green Journey in Sendai 2023	April 16, 2023	Sendai, Japan	Xebio Arena Sendai	Jake Lee (c) vs. Katsuhiko Nakajima for the GHC Heavyweight Championship	
Majestic 2023	May 4, 2023	Tokyo, Japan	Ryōgoku Kokugikan	Jake Lee (c) vs. Naomichi Marufuji for the GHC Heavyweight Championship	
Great Journey in Nagoya 2023	June 17, 2023	Nagoya, Japan	Nagoya Congress Center	Jake Lee (c) vs. Takashi Sugiura for the GHC Heavyweight Championship	
Grand Ship In Nagoya 2023	September 24, 2023	Nagoya, Japan	Nagoya Congress Center	Jake Lee (c) vs. Go Shiozaki for the GHC Heavyweight Championship	
Demolition Stage In Fukuoka 2023	October 28, 2023	Fukuoka, Japan	Fukuoka Convention Center	Jake Lee (c) vs. Kenoh for the GHC Heavyweight Championship	
(c) – refers to the champion(s) heading into the match

=== 2024 ===
Event	Date	Location	Venue	Main event	Ref
The New Year	January 2, 2024	Tokyo, Japan	Ariake Arena	Naomichi Marufuji vs. Kota Ibushi	
Star Navigation 2024 (Night 1)	January 13, 2024	Tokyo, Japan	Korakuen Hall	Kenoh (c) vs. Go Shiozaki for the GHC Heavyweight Championship	
Sunny Voyage 2024	January 17, 2024	Tokyo, Japan	Shinjuku Face	Jack Morris (c) vs. Titus Alexander for the GHC National Championship	
Cross Over in Sendai	February 4, 2024	Sendai, Japan	Sendai Sun Plaza	Kenoh (c) vs. El Hijo de Dr. Wagner Jr. for the GHC Heavyweight Championship	
Star Navigation 2024 (Night 2)	February 23, 2024	Tokyo, Japan	Korakuen Hall	Jack Morris (c) vs. Anthony Greene for the GHC National Championship	
Great Voyage in Yokohama	March 17, 2024	Yokohama, Japan	Yokohama Budokan	Good Looking Guys (Anthony Greene and Jack Morris) (c) vs. Real (Saxon Huxley and Timothy Thatcher) for the GHC Tag Team Championship	
Star Navigation 2024 (Night 3)	March 31, 2024	Tokyo, Japan	Korakuen Hall	El Hijo de Dr. Wagner Jr. (c) vs. Jake Lee for the GHC Heavyweight Championship	
Star Navigation 2024 (Night 4)	April 11, 2024	Tokyo, Japan	Korakuen Hall	Kaito Kiyomiya vs. Kenoh in a number one contendership match for the GHC Heavyweight Championship	
Wrestle Magic	May 4, 2024	Tokyo, Japan	Ryogoku Kokugikan	El Hijo de Dr. Wagner Jr. (c) vs. Kaito Kiyomiya for the GHC Heavyweight Championship	
Limit Break 2	May 29, 2024	Tokyo, Japan	Shinjuku Face	Akitoshi Saito (c) vs. Go Shiozaki for the Zero1 World Heavyweight Championship	
Grand Ship in Yokohama	June 16, 2024	Yokohama, Japan	Yokohama Buntai	Kaito Kiyomiya (c) vs. Gabe Kidd for the GHC Heavyweight Championship	
Destination 2024	July 13, 2024	Tokyo, Japan	Nippon Budokan	Kaito Kiyomiya (c) vs. Yoichi for the GHC Heavyweight Championship	
Star Navigation in Tokyo 2024	September 14, 2024	Tokyo, Japan	Korakuen Hall	Kaito Kiyomiya vs. Ryohei Oiwa	
Star Navigation Premium: Akitoshi Saito Road Last	October 14, 2024	Tokyo, Japan	Korakuen Hall	Kaito Kiyomiya (c) vs. Masa Kitamiya for the GHC Heavyweight Championship	
Deathnity	November 17, 2024	Nagoya, Japan	Aichi Prefectural Gymnasium	Kaito Kiyomiya (c) vs. Takashi Sugiura for the GHC Heavyweight Championship	
(c) – refers to the champion(s) heading into the match

=== 2025 ===
Event	Date	Location	Venue	Main event	Ref
The New Year 2025	January 1, 2025	Tokyo, Japan	Nippon Budokan	Kaito Kiyomiya (c) vs. Ozawa for the GHC Heavyweight Championship	
Star Navigation Premium 2025 (Night 1)	January 11, 2025	Tokyo, Japan	Korakuen Hall	Manabu Soya (c) vs. Tetsuya Endo for the GHC National Championship	
Star Navigation Premium 2025 (Night 2)	February 11, 2025	Tokyo, Japan	Korakuen Hall	Ozawa (c) vs. Galeno del Mal for the GHC Heavyweight Championship	
Memorial Voyage in Yokohama	March 2, 2025	Yokohama, Japan	Yokohama Budokan	Ozawa (Heavyweight) vs. Manabu Soya (National) in a winner takes all match for the GHC Heavyweight Championship and GHC National Championship	
Star Navigation Premium 2025 (Night 3)	March 22, 2025	Tokyo, Japan	Korakuen Hall	Ozawa (c) vs. Masa Kitamiya for the GHC Heavyweight Championship	
25th Anniversary Memorial Voyage in Kokugikan	May 3, 2025	Tokyo, Japan	Ryogoku Kokugikan	Ozawa (c) vs. Kenta for the GHC Heavyweight Championship	
Star Navigation 2025 (Night 1)	May 18, 2025	Tokyo, Japan	Korakuen Hall	Ozawa (c) vs. Kaito Kiyomiya for the GHC Heavyweight Championship	
Star Navigation 2025 (Night 2)	June 3, 2025	Tokyo, Japan	Korakuen Hall	Ozawa (c) vs. Tetsuya Endo vs. Takashi Sugiura for the GHC Heavyweight Championship	
New Departure	July 19, 2025	Tokyo, Japan	Korakuen Hall	Ozawa (c) vs. Kenoh for the GHC Heavyweight Championship	
New Departure	July 20, 2025	Tokyo, Japan	Korakuen Hall	Kenoh (c) vs. Kenta for the GHC Heavyweight Championship	
Wrestle Odyssey	October 11, 2025	Tokyo, Japan	Ryogoku Kokugikan	Kenta (c) vs. Masa Kitamiya for the GHC Heavyweight Championship	
Star Navigation 2025 (Night 3)	November 8, 2025	Tokyo, Japan	Korakuen Hall	Kenta (c) vs. Yoshiki Inamura for the GHC Heavyweight Championship	
Cross Over in Sendai 2025	November 21, 2025	Sendai, Japan	Sendai Sun Plaza	Yoshiki Inamura (c) vs. Kaito Kiyomiya for the GHC Heavyweight Championship	
(c) – refers to the champion(s) heading into the match

=== 2026 ===
Event	Date	Location	Venue	Main event	Ref
The New Year 2026	January 1, 2026	Tokyo, Japan	Nippon Budokan	Yoshiki Inamura (c) vs. Ozawa for the GHC Heavyweight Championship	
Legacy Rise 2026 (Night 1)	January 11, 2026	Tokyo, Japan	Korakuen Hall	Yoshiki Inamura (c) vs. Masa Kitamiya for the GHC Heavyweight Championship	
Apex Conquest 2026 (Night 1)	March 8, 2026	Yokohama, Japan	Yokohama Budokan	Yoshiki Inamura (c) vs. Kenoh for the GHC Heavyweight Championship	
Apex Conquest 2026 (Night 2)	April 12, 2026	Nagoya, Japan	Kinjofuto Arena	Yoshiki Inamura (c) vs. Alpha Wolf for the GHC Heavyweight Championship	
Spring Mayhem	May 2, 2026	Tokyo, Japan	Ryogoku Kokugikan	Yoshiki Inamura (c) vs. Shane Haste for the GHC Heavyweight Championship	
Legacy Rise 2026 (Night 2)	June 25, 2026	Tokyo, Japan	Korakuen Hall	Shane Haste (c) vs. Tetsuya Endo for the GHC Heavyweight Championship	
Summer Epic 2026	July 18, 2026	Osaka, Japan	Intex Osaka – Hall 5	Shane Haste (c) vs. Ozawa for the GHC Heavyweight Championship	
Legacy Rise 2026 (Night 4)	August 10, 2026	Tokyo, Japan	Korakuen Hall	Eita (c) vs. Kai Fujimura for the GHC Junior Heavyweight Championship	
Wrestle Odyssey	October 25, 2026	Tokyo, Japan	Ryogoku Kokugikan	Tetsuya Naito (c) vs. Ozawa for the GHC Heavyweight Championship	
(c) – refers to the champion(s) heading into the match

== Upcoming events ==
Event	Date	Location	Venue	Main event	Ref

== Shared events ==
=== New Japan Pro Wrestling ===
Starting with 2022, Pro Wrestling Noah began organizing exhibition matches as part of various events promoted by New Japan Pro Wrestling, mainly the Wrestle Kingdom branch. All the matches usually took place in the second or third night of the event, dedicated to inter-promotional competition. The bouts are preponderantly scripted as tag team matches in which Noah's wrestlers compete under the banner of their respective units against the wrestlers from NJPW's units. As of October 25, 2026, Noah has held matches in two different NJPW pay-per-views.

NJPW-only promoted events
Event	Date	Location	Venue	Second & Third day main event	Ref
Wrestle Kingdom 16	January 8, 2022	Yokohama, Kanagawa, Japan	Yokohama Arena	Kazuchika Okada and Hiroshi Tanahashi vs. Keiji Mutoh and Kaito Kiyomiya	
Wrestle Kingdom 17	January 21, 2023	Yokohama, Kanagawa, Japan	Yokohama Arena	Tetsuya Naito vs. Kenoh	

=== All Together ===
All Together was a series of two professional wrestling events organized together by Japan's three biggest promotions; All Japan Pro Wrestling (AJPW), New Japan Pro-Wrestling (NJPW) and Pro Wrestling Noah, in response to the March 2011 Tōhoku earthquake and tsunami. The first event was held in Tokyo on August 27, 2011, and the second in Sendai on February 19, 2012. All proceeds from the events were donated to Japanese Red Cross. The events featured no storylines or championship matches, instead they were booked as "supercards", putting together combinations of wrestlers from the three promotions that fans would normally not see.

== See also ==
- List of Pro Wrestling Noah personnel
