= Noah Summer Epic 2026 =

2026 Pro Wrestling Noah event

NOAH Summer Epic
- Promotional poster featuring various wrestlers
- Promotion: CyberFight
- Brand: Pro Wrestling Noah
- Date: July 18, 2026
- City: Osaka, Japan
- Venue: Intex Osaka – Hall 5
- Attendance: 2,088

Pay-per-view chronology
← Previous; Legacy Rise 2026 (Night 2)	Next → —

NOAH Summer Epic was a professional wrestling event promoted by CyberFight's sub-brand Pro Wrestling Noah and took place on July 18, 2026, in Osaka, Japan, at the Intex Osaka – Hall 5. It was broadcast on CyberAgent's AbemaTV online linear television service and CyberFight's streaming service Wrestle Universe.

== Background ==
=== Storylines ===
The event featured eleven professional wrestling matches that resulted from scripted storylines, where wrestlers portrayed villains, heroes, or less distinguishable characters in the scripted events that built tension and culminated in a wrestling match or series of matches.

=== Event ===
The event started with two preshow bouts. In the first one, Atsushi Kotoge, Hajime Ohara, Mohammed Yone and Hi69 outmatched Hiroto Tsuruya, Katsumi Inahata, Midori Takahashi and Yuto Koyanagi in eight-man tag team competition, while in the second one, Hayata and Tetsuya Endo picked up a victory over Black Menso-re and Ryusei in tag team competition.

In the first main card bout, Dragon Bane and Alejandro defeated Dragongate's Jacky Kamei and Riiita to secure the fourth consecutive defense of the GHC Junior Heavyweight Tag Team Championship in that respective reign. Next up, Yoshiki Inamura defeated Kazuyuki Fujita in singles competition. The fifth match saw Alpha Wolf defeat Amakusa, Daiki Odashima, Jun Masaoka, Kid Lykos, Kid Lykos II and Tadasuke in a ladder match to qualify to the 2026 N-1 Victory tournament. Next up, Tetsuya Naito defeated Kaito Kiyomiya in singles competition. The seventh bout saw Eita defeat Bushi to secure the second consecutive defense of the GHC Junior Heavyweight Championship in that respective reign. Next up, Manabu Soya and Yuki Iino) defeated Masa Kitamiya and Takashi Sugiura to secure the first consecutive defense of the GHC Tag Team Championship in that respective reign. In the semi main event, Naomichi Marufuji defeated Kenoh to secure the third consecutive defense of the GHC National Championship in that respective reign.

In the main event, Shane Haste defeated Ozawa to secure the third consecutive defense of the GHC Heavyweight Championship in that respective reign.

== Results ==
No.	Results	Stipulations	Times
1^{P}	Team Noah (Atsushi Kotoge, Hajime Ohara, Mohammed Yone and Hi69) defeated Hiroto Tsuruya, Katsumi Inahata, Midori Takahashi and Yuto Koyanagi by pinfall	Eight-man tag team match	4:26
2^{P}	White Raven Squad (Hayata and Tetsuya Endo) defeated Black Menso-re and Ryusei by pinfall	Tag team match	5:55
3	Dragon Bane and Alejandro (c) defeated Love And Peace (Jacky Kamei and Riiita) by pinfall	Tag team match for the GHC Junior Heavyweight Tag Team Championship	11:03
4	Yoshiki Inamura defeated Kazuyuki Fujita by pinfall	Singles match	4:37
5	Alpha Wolf defeated Amakusa, Daiki Odashima, Jun Masaoka, Kid Lykos, Kid Lykos II and Tadasuke	N-1 Victory qualifier Seven-way ladder match	10:38
6	Tetsuya Naito defeated Kaito Kiyomiya by pinfall	Singles match	15:05
7	Eita (c) defeated Bushi by pinfall	Singles match for the GHC Junior Heavyweight Championship	12:50
8	Jōnetsu MAX (Manabu Soya and Yuki Iino) (c) defeated Team 2000X (Masa Kitamiya and Takashi Sugiura) by pinfall	Tag team match for the GHC Tag Team Championship	10:25
9	Naomichi Marufuji (c) defeated Kenoh by pinfall	Singles match for the GHC National Championship	12:39
10	Shane Haste (c) defeated Ozawa by pinfall	Singles match for the GHC Heavyweight Championship	17:52
(c) / – the champion(s) heading into the match; P / – the match was broadcast on the pre-show
