= Wrestle Odyssey 2 =

2026 Pro Wrestling Noah event

- Promotional poster of the event
- Promotion: CyberFight
- Brand: Pro Wrestling Noah
- Date: October 25, 2026
- City: Tokyo, Japan
- Venue: Ryogoku Kokugikan
- Attendance: 4,253

Pay-per-view chronology
← Previous; N-1 Victory	Next → —

Wrestle Odyssey chronology
← Previous; 1	Next → —

Wrestle Odyssey 2 was a professional wrestling event promoted by CyberFight's sub-brand Pro Wrestling Noah and took place on October 25, 2026, in Tokyo, Japan, at the Ryogoku Kokugikan. Broadcasting was made on CyberAgent's AbemaTV online linear television service and CyberFight's streaming service Abema TV online linear television service and CyberFight's streaming service Wrestle Universe.

== Background ==
=== Storylines ===
The event featured professional wrestling matches that result from scripted storylines, where wrestlers portrayed villains, heroes, or less distinguishable characters in the scripted events that built tension and culminated in a wrestling match or series of matches.

=== Event ===
The event started with the tag team confrontation between Hiroto Tsuruya and Hiroya Namiki, and Atsushi Kotoge and Hi69, solded with the victory of the latters. In the second bout, Jun Masaoka and Yo-Hey defeated Alejandro and Daiki Odashima to secure the first successful defense of the GHC Junior Heavyweight Tag Team Championship in that respective reign. Next up, Alpha Wolf and Tadasuke outmatched Tetsuya Endo and Yuto Koyanagi, Bushi and Ryusei, and Black Menso-re and Kazuyuki Fujita in four-way tag team competition. The fourth bout saw Masa Kitamiya and Takashi Sugiura pick up a victory over Kenta and Shuhei Taniguchi in tag team competition. Next up, Shuji Kondo defeated Hayata to win the GHC 200 Championship, ending the latter's reign at 76 days and one defense.

In the sixth bout, Kaito Kiyomiya and Yoshiki Inamura defeat Kenoh and Kouga in tag team competition. Next up, Luis Mante defeated Naomichi Marufuji to win the GHC National Championship, ending the latter's reign at 173 days and four defenses.

In the eighth bout, Manabu Soya and Yuki Iino defeated the teams of Mikey Nicholls and Shane Haste, and Doc Gallows and Karl Anderson to secure the third consecutive defense of the GHC Tag Team Championship in that respective reign. In the semi main event, Kai Fujimura defeated Dragon Bane to secure the second consecutive defense of the GHC Junior Heavyweight Championship in that respective reign.

In the main event, Tetsuya Naito defeated the 2026 N-1 Victory winner Ozawa to secure the first successful defense of the GHC Heavyweight Championship in that respective reign.

== Results ==
No.	Results	Stipulations	Times
1	Atsushi Kotoge and Hi69 defeated Hiroto Tsuruya and Hiroya Namiki by pinfall	Tag team match	7:28
2	Team 2000X (Jun Masaoka and Yo-Hey) (c) defeated Alejandro and Daiki Odashima by pinfall	Tag team match for the GHC Junior Heavyweight Tag Team Championship	13:20
3	Team 2000X (Alpha Wolf and Tadasuke) defeated Tetsuya Endo and Yuto Koyanagi, and Los Tranquilos de Japon (Bushi and Ryusei) and Black Menso-re and Kazuyuki Fujita by pinfall	Four-way tag team match	4:17
4	Team 2000X (Masa Kitamiya and Takashi Sugiura) defeated Kenta and Shuhei Taniguchi by pinfall	Tag team match	10:48
5	Shuji Kondo defeated Hayata (c) by countout	Singles match for the GHC 200 Championship	2:11
6	Kaito Kiyomiya and Yoshiki Inamura defeated Kenoh and Kouga by pinfall	Tag team match	25:15
7	Luis Mante defeated Naomichi Marufuji (c) by pinfall	Singles match for the GHC National Championship	12:22
8	Jōnetsu Max (Manabu Soya and Yuki Iino) (c) defeated TMDK (Mikey Nicholls and Shane Haste) and Good Brothers (Doc Gallows and Karl Anderson) by pinfall	Three-way tag team match for the GHC Tag Team Championship	15:05
9	Kai Fujimura (c) defeated Dragon Bane by pinfall	Singles match for the GHC Junior Heavyweight Championship	15:40
10	Tetsuya Naito (c) defeated Ozawa by pinfall	Singles match for the GHC Heavyweight Championship	25:47
(c) / – the champion(s) heading into the match
