= Wrestle Odyssey =

2025 Pro Wrestling Noah event

- Promotional poster of the event featuring Kenta
- Promotion: CyberFight
- Brand: Pro Wrestling Noah
- Date: October 11, 2025
- City: Tokyo, Japan
- Venue: Ryogoku Kokugikan
- Attendance: 3,617

Pay-per-view chronology
← Previous; N-1 Victory	Next → Star Navigation (November)

Wrestle Odyssey chronology
← Previous; First	Next → 2

Wrestle Odyssey was a professional wrestling event promoted by CyberFight's sub-brand Pro Wrestling Noah and took place on October 11, 2025, in Tokyo, Japan, at the Ryogoku Kokugikan. Broadcasting was made on CyberAgent's AbemaTV online linear television service and CyberFight's streaming service Abema TV.

== Background ==
=== Storylines ===
The event featured professional wrestling matches that result from scripted storylines, where wrestlers portrayed villains, heroes, or less distinguishable characters in the scripted events that built tension and culminated in a wrestling match or series of matches.

=== Event ===
The event started with the singles confrontation between Kai Fujimura and Junta Miyawaki, solded with the victory of the latter. Next up, Galeno and Harutoki picked up a victory over Manabu Soya and Yuto Kikuchi in tag team competition. The third bout saw WWE NXT wrestlers Charlie Dempsey and Harlem Lewis defeat Jack Morris and Ulka Sasaki in tag team competition. In the fourth bout, Takashi Sugiura and Shun Skywalker defeated Tetsuya Endo and Hayata. Next up, Daga and Daiki Odashima defeated Dragon Bane and Alpha Wolf to win the GHC Junior Heavyweight Tag Team Championship, ending the latter teams' reign at 161 days and four defenses. In the sixth match, Kazuyuki Fujita and Minoru Suzuki fought into a double countout. The seventh match saw Hiroshi Tanahashi and Kaito Kiyomiya defeat Naomichi Marufuji and Kenoh in tag team competition. In the semi main event, Hiromu Takahashi defeated Eita to secure the second consecutive defense of the GHC Junior Heavyweight Championship in that respective reign.

In the main event, Kenta defeated Masa Kitamiya to secure the second consecutive defense of the GHC Heavyweight Championship in that respective reign. After the bout concluded, Kenta was challenged by Yoshiki Inamura to a further title match.

== Results ==
No.	Results	Stipulations	Times
1	Junta Miyawaki defeated Kai Fujimura by pinfall	Singles match	7:28
2	All Rebellion (Galeno and Harutoki) defeated Ratel's (Manabu Soya and Yuto Kikuchi) by pinfall	Tag team match	5:33
3	Charlie Dempsey and Harlem Lewis defeated Jack Morris and Ulka Sasaki by pinfall	Tag team match	11:42
4	Takashi Sugiura and Shun Skywalker (with Ozawa) defeated Tetsuya Endo and Hayata by pinfall	Tag team match	12:00
5	Daga and Daiki Odashima defeated Los Golpeadores (Dragon Bane and Alpha Wolf) (c) by pinfall	Tag team match for the GHC Junior Heavyweight Tag Team Championship	15:20
6	Kazuyuki Fujita vs. Minoru Suzuki ended in a double countout	Singles match	9:39
7	Hiroshi Tanahashi and Kaito Kiyomiya defeated Naomichi Marufuji and Kenoh by pinfall	Tag team match	10:29
8	Hiromu Takahashi (c) defeated Eita by pinfall	Singles match for the GHC Junior Heavyweight Championship	16:29
9	Kenta (c) defeated Masa Kitamiya by pinfall	Singles match for the GHC Heavyweight Championship	23:34
(c) / – the champion(s) heading into the match
