= Noah The New Year 2026 =

2026 Pro Wrestling Noah event

NOAH The New Year 2026
- Promotional poster featuring various participants
- Promotion: CyberFight
- Brand: Pro Wrestling Noah
- Date: January 1, 2026
- City: Tokyo, Japan
- Venue: Nippon Budokan
- Attendance: 6,278

Pay-per-view chronology
← Previous; Cross Over in Sendai	Next → Legacy Rise

Noah The New Year chronology
← Previous; 2025	Next → —

NOAH The New Year 2026 was a professional wrestling event promoted by CyberFight's sub-brand Pro Wrestling Noah and took place on January 1, 2026, in Tokyo, Japan, at the Nippon Budokan. It was broadcast on CyberAgent's AbemaTV online linear television service and CyberFight's streaming service Wrestle Universe. It was the first pay-per-view promoted by Noah in 2026.

Nine matches were contested at the event, including one on the pre-show, and five of Noah's seven championships were on the line. The main event saw Yoshiki Inamura defeat Ozawa to retain the GHC Heavyweight Championship. In other prominent matches, Amakusa defeated Hiromu Takahashi to win the GHC Junior Heavyweight Championship, Los Tranquilos de Japon (Bushi and Tetsuya Naito) defeated Kenoh and Naomichi Marufuji to win the GHC Tag Team Championship, and Alpha Wolf defeated Dragon Bane to win the GHC National Championship.

== Background ==
=== Storylines ===
The event featured eleven professional wrestling matches that resulted from scripted storylines, in which wrestlers portrayed villains, heroes, or less distinguishable characters in events that built tension and culminated in a wrestling match or series of matches.

=== Event ===
The event started with one preshow bout in which Daga and Daiki Odashima defeated Kai Fujimura and Alejandro, and Eita and Shuji Kondo in three-way tag team match to secure the second consecutive defense of the GHC Junior Heavyweight Tag Team Championship during their reign.

In the second bout, Masa Kitamiya, Takashi Sugiura, Tadasuke and Jun Masaoka outmatched Kazuyuki Fujita, Minoru Suzuki, Shuhei Taniguchi and Junta Miyawaki in eight-man tag team competition. The third bout saw Saxon Huxley defeated Will Kroos to win Progress Wrestling's Progress Atlas Championship, ending the latter's reign at 95 days and three defenses. Next up, Kenta, Ulka Sasaki, Tetsuya Endo and Hayata picked up a victory over Atsushi Kotoge, Muhammad Yone, Hajime Ohara and Hi69 in eight-man tag team competition. In the fifth match, Alpha Wolf defeated former Los Golpeadores tag team partner Dragon Bane to win the GHC National Championship, ending the latter's reign at 77 days and no defenses. After the bout concluded, Wolf joined Team 2000X. Next up, Karl Anderson and Doc Gallows picked up a victory over Kaito Kiyomiya and Jack Morris in tag team competition. The seventh bout saw Bushi and Tetsuya Naito defeat Kenoh and Naomichi Marufuji to win the GHC Tag Team Championship, ending the latter's reign at 19 days and no defenses. In the semi main event, Amakusa defeated Hiromu Takahashi to win the GHC Junior Heavyweight Championship, ending the latter's reign at 115 days and two defenses. After the bout concluded, Daiki Odashima stepped up as Amakusa's new challenger.

In the main event, Yoshiki Inamura defeated Ozawa to secure the second consecutive defense of the GHC Heavyweight Championship in that respective reign. After the bout concluded, Kenoh stepped up as the new challenger, not before Masa Kitamiya also making a statement for a challenge.

== Results ==
No.	Results	Stipulations	Times
1^{P}	Los Intocables (Daga and Daiki Odashima) (c) defeated All Rebellion (Kai Fujimura and Alejandro) and Eita and Shuji Kondo by pinfall	Three-way tag team match for the GHC Junior Heavyweight Tag Team Championship	7:43
2	Team 2000X (Masa Kitamiya, Takashi Sugiura, Tadasuke and Jun Masaoka) defeated Kazuyuki Fujita, Minoru Suzuki, Shuhei Taniguchi and Junta Miyawaki by submission	Eight-man tag team match	6:48
3	Saxon Huxley (with Manabu Soya) defeated Will Kroos (c) by pinfall	Singles match for the Progress Atlas Championship	8:07
4	White Raven Squad (Kenta, Ulka Sasaki, Tetsuya Endo and Hayata) defeated Team Noah (Atsushi Kotoge, Muhammad Yone, Hajime Ohara and Hi69) by pinfall	Eight-man tag team match	6:53
5	Alpha Wolf defeated Dragon Bane (c) by pinfall	Singles match for the GHC National Championship	13:17
6	Good Brothers (Karl Anderson and Doc Gallows) defeated Kaito Kiyomiya and Jack Morris by pinfall	Tag team match	11:50
7	Los Tranquilos de Japon (Bushi and Tetsuya Naito) (with Ryusei) defeated Maruken (Kenoh and Naomichi Marufuji) (c) by pinfall	Tag team match for the GHC Tag Team Championship	13:16
8	Amakusa defeated Hiromu Takahashi (c) by pinfall	Singles match for the GHC Junior Heavyweight Championship	14:24
9	Yoshiki Inamura (c) defeated Ozawa by pinfall	Singles match for the GHC Heavyweight Championship	21:18
(c) / – the champion(s) heading into the match; P / – the match was broadcast on the pre-show
