= Noah Legacy Rise 2026 =

2026 Pro Wrestling Noah event

NOAH Legacy Rise 2026 (Night 1)
- Promotional poster featuring Yoshiki Inamura and Masa Kitamiya
- Promotion: CyberFight
- Brand: Pro Wrestling Noah
- Date: January 11, 2026
- City: Tokyo, Japan
- Venue: Korakuen Hall
- Attendance: 1,489

Pay-per-view chronology
← Previous; The New Year 2026	Next → Apex Conquest

NOAH Legacy Rise 2026 was a multiple-night professional wrestling event promoted by CyberFight's sub-brand Pro Wrestling Noah. The four pay-per-view nights of the event took place between January 11 and August 10, 2026, in Tokyo, Japan, at the Korakuen Hall. It was broadcast on CyberAgent's AbemaTV online linear television service and CyberFight's streaming service Wrestle Universe.

== Background ==
=== Storylines ===
The event featured eleven professional wrestling matches that resulted from scripted storylines, where wrestlers portrayed villains, heroes, or less distinguishable characters in the scripted events that built tension and culminated in a wrestling match or series of matches.

== Night 1 ==
=== Event ===
Seven matches were contested at the event, with two of Noah's seven championships on the line. The main event saw Yoshiki Inamura defeat Masa Kitamiya to retain the GHC Heavyweight Championship. In another prominent match, Amakusa defeated Daiki Odashima to retain the GHC Junior Heavyweight Championship.

The event started with the ten-man tag team confrontation in which the team of Atsushi Kotoge, Hajime Ohara, Hi69 and Shuhei Taniguchi picked up a victory over the team of Hiroto Tsuruya, Katsumi Inahata, Midori Takahashi and Yuto Koyanagi. Next up, Daga, Dragon Bane, Galeno, Jack Morris and Will Kroos outmatched Eita, Kenoh, Manabu Soya and Naomichi Marufuji in eight-man tag team competition. The third bout saw Kenta defeat Ulka Sasaki in singles competition. In the fourth bout, Alpha Wolf, Jun Masaoka, Tadasuke and Takashi Sugiura defeated Alejandro, Harutoki, Kai Fujimura and Kaito Kiyomiya in eight-man tag team competition. During the match, Fujimura attacked Alejandro, thus handing Team 2000X the win. Fujimura defected All Rebellion and joined Team 2000X in the process. In the fifth match, Tetsuya Endo picked up a victory over Ozawa in singles competition.

In the semi main event, Amakusa defeated Daiki Odashima to secure the first successful defense of the GHC Junior Heavyweight Championship in that respective reign.

In the main event, Yoshiki Inamura defeated Masa Kitamiya to secure the third consecutive defense of the GHC Heavyweight Championship in that rspective reign. After the bout concluded, Kenoh demanded a title match but was attacked by Takashi Sugiura who wanted a title match for himself instead.

=== Results ===
No.	Results	Stipulations	Times
1	Team Noah (Atsushi Kotoge, Hajime Ohara, Hi69 and Shuhei Taniguchi) defeated Hiroto Tsuruya, Katsumi Inahata, Midori Takahashi and Yuto Koyanagi by pinfall	Eight-man tag team match	6:21
2	Daga, Dragon Bane, Galeno, Jack Morris and Will Kroos defeated Eita, Kenoh, Manabu Soya and Naomichi Marufuji by pinfall	Ten-man tag team match	7:56
3	Kenta defeated Ulka Sasaki by pinfall	Singles match	11:03
4	Team 2000X (Alpha Wolf, Jun Masaoka, Tadasuke and Takashi Sugiura) defeated All Rebellion (Alejandro, Harutoki, Kai Fujimura and Kaito Kiyomiya) by pinfall	Eight-man tag team match	11:33
5	Tetsuya Endo defeated Ozawa by pinfall	Singles match	13:13
6	Amakusa (c) defeated Daiki Odashima by pinfall	Singles match for the GHC Junior Heavyweight Championship	16:06
7	Yoshiki Inamura (c) defeated Masa Kitamiya by pinfall	Singles match for the GHC Heavyweight Championship	28:26
(c) / – the champion(s) heading into the match

== Night 2 ==
NOAH Legacy Rise 2026 (Night 2)
- Promotional poster featuring Shane Haste and Tetsuya Endo
- Promotion: CyberFight
- Brand: Pro Wrestling Noah
- Date: June 25, 2026
- City: Tokyo, Japan
- Venue: Korakuen Hall
- Attendance: 1,202

Pay-per-view chronology
← Previous; Spring Mayhem	Next → Summer Epic

=== Event ===
The event started with the six-man tag team confrontation in which the team of Amakusa, Stallion Rogers and Yoshiki Inamura outmatched Kenoh, Kid Lykos and Kid Lykos II.

In the second main card match, Daiki Odashima, Hiroto Tsuruya, Midori Takahashi and Yuto Koyanagi picked up a victory over Alpha Wolf, Jun Masaoka, Tadasuke and Takashi Sugiura via disqualification. Next up, Hayata and Katsumi Inahata outmatched Eita and Super Crazy in tag team competition. The fourth match saw Kai Fujimura, Masa Kitamiya and Ozawa defeat Alejandro, Kaito Kiyomiya and Dragon Bane in six-man tag team competition. In the fifth bout of the event, Naomichi Marufuji defeated Shuji Kondo to secure the second consecutive defense of the GHC National Championship in that respective reign. After the bout concluded, he received a title challenge from Kenoh. In the semi main event, 2026 Global Tag League winners Manabu Soya and Yuki Iino defeated Tetsuya Naito and Bushi to win the GHC Tag Team Championship, ending the latter team's reign at 175 days and three defenses.

In the main event, Shane Haste defeated Tetsuya Endo to secure the second consecutive defense of the GHC Heavyweight Championship in that respective reign. After the bout concluded, he received a title challenge from Ozawa.

=== Results ===
No.	Results	Stipulations	Times
1	Amakusa, Stallion Rogers and Yoshiki Inamura defeated Kenoh and Lykos Gym (Kid Lykos and Kid Lykos II) by pinfall	Six-man tag team match	6:40
2	Daiki Odashima, Hiroto Tsuruya, Midori Takahashi and Yuto Koyanagi defeated Team 2000X (Alpha Wolf, Jun Masaoka, Tadasuke and Takashi Sugiura) by disqualification	Eight-man tag team match	4:01
3	Hayata and Katsumi Inahata defeated Eita and Super Crazy by pinfall	Tag team match	5:58
4	Team 2000X (Kai Fujimura, Masa Kitamiya and Ozawa) defeated All Rebellion (Alejandro and Kaito Kiyomiya) and Dragon Bane by pinfall	Six-man tag team match	9:03
5	Naomichi Marufuji (c) defeated Shuji Kondo by pinfall	Singles match for the GHC National Championship	12:47
6	Passionate Ratel's (Manabu Soya and Yuki Iino) defeated Los Tranquilos de Japon (Tetsuya Naito and Bushi) (c) by pinfall	Tag team match for the GHC Tag Team Championship	18:20
7	Shane Haste (c) defeated Tetsuya Endo by pinfall	Singles match for the GHC Heavyweight Championship	22:50
(c) / – the champion(s) heading into the match

== Night 3 ==
NOAH Legacy Rise 2026 (Night 3)
- Promotional poster featuring Shane Haste and Tetsuya Naito
- Promotion: CyberFight
- Brand: Pro Wrestling Noah
- Date: August 9, 2026
- City: Tokyo, Japan
- Venue: Korakuen Hall
- Attendance: 1,589

Pay-per-view chronology
← Previous; Summer Epic	Next → Noah Legacy (Night 4)

=== Event ===
The event started with the eight-man tag team competition bout from which the team of Atsushi Kotoge, Hajime Ohara, Hi69 and Mohammed Yone emerged victorious over the team of Alejandro, Dragon Bane, Katsumi Inahata and Shuji Kondo. Next up, Kid Lykos and Kid Lykos II picked up a victory over the teams of Buahi and Ryusei, and Black Menso-re and Super Crazy, and Midori Takahashi and Yuto Koyanagi in four-way tag team competition. The third bout saw Daiki Odashima and Eita wrestle Jun Masaoka and Kai Fujimura into a double countout, only for the match to restart and be lost by Odashima and Eita via disqualification.

On July 18, 2026, Pro Wrestling Noah announced the creation of the GHC 200 Championship. The first rounds of the inaugural tournament started with Hayata defeating Masa Kitamiya, and Tetsuya Endo defeating Amakusa to advance to the further phases. In the other two first round bouts, Alpha Wolf against Kenoh and Kaito Kiyomiya against Yoshiki Inamura both ended in time-limit draws, therefore Hayata and Endo obtained bye victories through the finals.

In the seventh bout of the event, Ozawa, Tadasuke and Takashi Sugiura outmatched Manabu Soya, Yo-Hey and Yuki Iino in six-man tag team competition. In the semi main event, Naomichi Marufuji defeated Kenta to secure the fourth consecutive defense of the GHC National Championship in that respective reign.

In the main event, Tetsuya Naito defeated Shane Haste to win the GHC Heavyweight Championship, ending the latter's reign at 99 days and three defenses.

=== Results ===
No.	Results	Stipulations	Times
1	Team Noah (Atsushi Kotoge, Hajime Ohara, Hi69 and Mohammed Yone) defeated Alejandro, Dragon Bane, Katsumi Inahata and Shuji Kondo by pinfall	Eight-man tag team match	7:18
2	Kid Lykos and Kid Lykos II defeated Buahi and Ryusei, and Black Menso-re and Super Crazy, and Midori Takahashi and Yuto Koyanagi by pinfall	Four-way tag team match	6:01
3	Daiki Odashima and Eita vs. Team 2000X (Jun Masaoka and Kai Fujimura) ended in a double countout	Tag team match	0:51
4	Team 2000X (Jun Masaoka and Kai Fujimura) defeated Daiki Odashima and Eita by disqualification	Tag team match	2:34
5	Hayata defeated Masa Kitamiya by countout	GHC 200 Championship tournament first round match	1:33
6	Tetsuya Endo defeated Amakusa by pinfall	GHC 200 Championship tournament first round match	1:55
7	Team 2000X (Ozawa, Tadasuke and Takashi Sugiura) defeated Passionate Ratel's (Manabu Soya, Yo-Hey and Yuki Iino) by pinfall	Six-man tag team match	10:03
8	Alpha Wolf vs. Kenoh ended in a time-limit draw	GHC 200 Championship tournament first round match	3:20
9	Kaito Kiyomiya vs. Yoshiki Inamura ended in a time-limit draw	GHC 200 Championship tournament first round match	3:20
10	Naomichi Marufuji (c) defeated Kenta by pinfall	Singles match for the GHC National Championship	20:45
11	Tetsuya Naito defeated Shane Haste (c) by pinfall	Singles match for the GHC Heavyweight Championship	22:17
(c) / – the champion(s) heading into the match

== Night 4 ==
NOAH Legacy Rise 2026 (Night 4)
- Promotional poster featuring Eita and Kai Fujimura
- Promotion: CyberFight
- Brand: Pro Wrestling Noah
- Date: August 10, 2026
- City: Tokyo, Japan
- Venue: Korakuen Hall
- Attendance: 1,292

Pay-per-view chronology
← Previous; Noah Legacy (Night 3)	Next → N-1 Victory

=== Event ===
The event started with the singles confrontation between Hiroya Namiki and Daiki Odashima, resulting in the victory of the latter.

Next up, Kenoh and Naomichi Marufuji picked up a victory over Amakusa and Black Menso-re. The third bout saw Hiroto Tsuruya, Katsumi Inahata, Kazuyuki Fujita and Yoshiki Inamura outmatch Manabu Soya, Yuki Iino, Super Crazy and Yuto Koyanagi in eight-man tag team competition. Next up, Alpha Wolf, Jun Masaoka and Ozawa picked up a victory over Kenta, Shane Haste and Midori Takahashi in six-man tag team competition. The fifth bout of the event portrayed Bushi, Ryusei and Tetsuya Naito outmatching Kid Lykos, Kid Lykos II and Kaito Kiyomiya in six-man tag team competition. Next up, Tadasuke defeated Yo-Hey by disqualification after Team 2000X members attacked Yo-Hey. The latter then attacked his Passionate Ratel's stablemates after they tried to make the save for him and joined Team 2000X. In the seventh bout, Hayata defeated Tetsuya Endo in the finals of the inaugural eight-man tournament for the GHC 200 Championship. In the semi main event, Alejandro and Dragon Bane defeated Atsushi Kotoge and Hi69 to secure the fifth consecutive defense of the GHC Junior Heavyweight Tag Team Championship in that respective reign.

In the main event, Kai Fujimura defeated Eita to win the GHC Junior Heavyweight Championship, ending the latter's reign at 51 days and two defenses.

=== Results ===
No.	Results	Stipulations	Times
1	Daiki Odashima defeated Hiroya Namiki by pinfall	Singles match	7:56
2	Kenoh and Naomichi Marufuji defeated Amakusa and Black Menso-re by pinfall	Tag team match	5:06
3	Hiroto Tsuruya, Katsumi Inahata, Kazuyuki Fujita and Yoshiki Inamura defeated Jōnetsu Max (Manabu Soya and Yuki Iino), Super Crazy and Yuto Koyanagi by pinfall	Eight-man tag team match	6:51
4	Team 2000X (Alpha Wolf, Jun Masaoka and Ozawa) defeated White Raven Squad (Kenta and Shane Haste) and Midori Takahashi by pinfall	Six-man tag team match	7:56
5	Los Tranquilos de Japon (Bushi, Ryusei and Tetsuya Naito) defeated Lykos Gym (Kid Lykos and Kid Lykos II) and Kaito Kiyomiya by pinfall	Six-man tag team match	7:11
6	Tadasuke defeated Yo-Hey by disqualification	Singles match	8:26
7	Hayata defeated Tetsuya Endo by pinfall	GHC 200 Championship tournament finals	2:27
8	Alejandro and Dragon Bane (c) defeated Atsushi Kotoge and Hi69 by pinfall	Tag team match for the GHC Junior Heavyweight Tag Team Championship	21:36
9	Kai Fujimura defeated Eita (c) by pinfall	Singles match for the GHC Junior Heavyweight Championship	21:29
(c) / – the champion(s) heading into the match
