= GHC 200 Championship =

Professional wrestling championship

- Current belt design (2026–present)

Details
- Promotion: CyberFight
- Brand: Pro Wrestling Noah
- Date established: July 18, 2026
- Current champion: Shuji Kondo
- Date won: October 25, 2026
Statistics
- First champion: Hayata
- Longest reign: Hayata (76 days)
- Oldest champion: Shuji Kondo (48 years, 9 months and 4 days)
- Youngest champion: Hayata (39 years and 6 days)
- Heaviest champion: Shuji Kondo (209 lbs)
- Lightest champion: Hayata (165 lbs)

The GHC 200 Championship (Japanese: GHC200王座, Hepburn: GHC Tūhandoreddo Ōza) is a professional wrestling championship in the Pro Wrestling Noah brand division of the Japanese promotion CyberFight. It is a specialized championship for which matches have a 200-second time limit. The inaugural champion was Hayata.

The title was announced on July 18, 2026, alongside an eight-man tournament to crown the first champion.

== History ==
On July 18, 2026, Pro Wrestling Noah announced the inaugural GHC 200 Championship tournament scheduled over two events on August 9 and 10 at Korakuen Hall. The eight participants were Kaito Kiyomiya, Yoshiki Inamura, Kenoh, Alpha Wolf, Tetsuya Endo, Amakusa, Hayata and Masa Kitamiya.

=== Inaugural championship tournament (2026) ===
Quarterfinals; Legacy Rise: Night 3 (August 9)
Kaito Kiyomiya | 3:20
Yoshiki Inamura | Draw
Kenoh | 3:20
Alpha Wolf | Draw
Tetsuya Endo | Pin
Amakusa | 1:55
Hayata | Countout
Masa Kitamiya | 1:33

Semifinals; Legacy Rise: Night 4 (August 10)
N/A
N/A
Tetsuya Endo | Bye
Hayata | Bye

Final; Legacy Rise: Night 4 (August 10)
Tetsuya Endo | 2:27
Hayata | Pin

=== Rules ===
GHC 200 Championship matches are fought under special rules. A countout is called after a five-count outside the ring (instead of a twenty-count). In title matches that end in a draw, the champion retains the title. For the inaugural tournament, any draw, including a time limit draw, will result in both competitors being eliminated; if every wrestler in a bracket is eliminated this way, a rematch will be held at a later date. For the tournament final specifically, if the match reaches the time limit, the outcome will be determined through on-site discussion.

== Reigns ==
As of October 25, 2026, there have been two reigns. The current champion is Shuji Kondo. He won the title by defeating Hayata at Wrestle Odyssey in Tokyo, Japan, on October 25, 2026.

Key
| No. | Overall reign number |
| Reign | Reign number for the specific champion |
| Days | Number of days held |
| Defenses | Number of successful defenses |
| + | Current reign is changing daily |

| No. | Champion | Championship change | | | Reign statistics | | | Notes | Ref. |
| No. | Champion | Date | Event | Location | Reign | Days | Defenses | Notes | Ref. |
|---|---|---|---|---|---|---|---|---|---|
| 1 | Hayata | August 10, 2026 | Legacy Rise (Night 4) | Tokyo, Japan | 1 | 76 | 1 | Defeated Tetsuya Endo in the final of an eight-man tournament to become the inaugural champion. | |
| 2 | Shuji Kondo | October 25, 2026 | Wrestle Odyssey | Tokyo, Japan | 1 | 0+ | 0 | | |

== See also ==
- G-Rush Championship
- NJPW World Television Championship
- WWE Speed Championship
- Professional wrestling in Japan
