= Daiki Odashima =

Japanese professional wrestler

Personal information
- Born: 14 March 2001 (age 25) Komae, Japan

Professional wrestling career
- Ring name: Daiki Odashima
- Billed height: 165 cm (5 ft 5 in)
- Billed weight: 75 kg (165 lb)
- Trained by: Tamon Honda; Noah Dojo
- Debut: 2024

Daiki Odashima (小田嶋大樹, Odashima Daiki) is a Japanese professional wrestler signed to Pro Wrestling Noah where he is a former GHC Junior Heavyweight Tag Team Champion. He sporadically competes for various promotions of the Japanese independent scene.

== Professional wrestling career ==
=== Pro Wrestling Noah (2024–present) ===
Growing up, Daiki Odashima was a student of Pro Wrestling Noah legend and 2 Time GHC Tag Team Champion Tamon Honda in his wrestling school. During Odashima's childhood he was trained in amateur wrestling, and was also a massive fan of Noah, citing a 2003 match between Mitsuharu Misawa and Kenta Kobashi as his inspiration. Daiki Odashima would originally try out for the Noah dojo, but failed the test. He then tried out again through Noah wrestler Kenoh's "Kenoh Channel Auditions" where he would pass and would be trained in the Noah dojo as well as by Tamon Honda.

Odashima made his professional wrestling debut in Pro Wrestling Noah at Noah Star Navigation in Tokyo 2024 on September 14, where he fell short to Yu Owada in singles competition. At Noah Star Navigation Premium: Akitoshi Saito Road Last on October 14, 2024, he fell short to Hayata. At Noah Deathnity on November 17, 2024, Odashima teamed up with Junta Miyawaki and Yu Owada in a losing effort against Alpha Wolf, El Hijo del Dr. Wagner Jr. and Galeno del Mal. At Noah The New Year 2025, he competed in the traditional Noah The Rumble won by Tadasuke. At Noah Star Navigation 2025 on May 18, he teamed up with Shuji Kondo in a losing effort against Mohammed Yone and Shuhei Taniguchi.

Odashima competed in various signature events. In the Global Junior Heavyweight Tag League, he made his first appearance at the 2025 edition of the tournament in which he teamed up with Eita, placing themselves in the A Block, failing to score any points after competing against the teams of Mark Trew and Kieron Lacey, Hayata and Yo-Hey, and Alejandro and Kai Fujimura.

At Noah Wrestle Odyssey 2025 on October 11, Odashima teamed up with Daga and defeated Los Golpeadores (Dragon Bane and Alpha Wolf) to win the GHC Junior Heavyweight Tag Team Championship. Odashima was still in his rookie period while achieving this, and to date is the first and only Noah wrestler to win a championship as a rookie.

Daiki Odashima and Daga would dub themselves as "Los Intocables", as tribute to a past Pro Wrestling Noah Tag Team known as "The Untouchables" which consisted of Mitsuharu Misawa and Yoshinari Ogawa. Around this time Daiki Odashima would score his first ever singles win, defeating the debuting Yuto Koyanagi in a singles match at Kaito Kiyomiya's 10th Anniversary Show, "Mad Decade" in Korakuen Hall. And 6 days later, Los Intocables would make their first defense of the GHC Junior Heavyweight Tag Team Championships on December 13, 2025 at Pro Wrestling Noah Sunny Voyage in Nagoya, Japan where they would successfully defend the Championships against Team 2000X members Tadasuke and Jun Masaoka. In January 2026, Daiki Odashima and Daga would defend the GHC Junior Heavyweight Tag Team Championships once again, this time at Noah The New Year 2026 at the Nippon Budokan where they would successfully defend the titles in a 3 Way Tag Team match against Eita and Shuji Kondo, as well as Alejandro and Kai Fujimura of All Rebellion.

Daiki Odashima would compete again in the Junior Tag League in 2026, this time alongside Daga, where they would score 8 points, but would narrowly miss the finals following a loss to eventual winners Alejandro and Dragon Bane, who would go on to defeat Alpha Wolf and Kai Fujimura of TEAM 2000X to win the league, thus becoming the number one contender's for Daiki Odashima and Daga's championships. And on March 8, 2026, Alejandro & Dragon Bane would defeat Los Intocables for the GHC Junior Heavyweight Tag Team Championships at Noah Apex Conquest 2026 at the Yokohama Budokan.

On April 1, 2026, Daiki Odashima faced his partner, Daga in Daga's final match in Noah. Daga would defeat Odashima with a Brainbuster after a back and forth 15 minute long match. After the match, Daga told Daiki Odashima that he was ready to become a singles champion.

=== Japanese independent circuit (2025–present) ===
Odashima often competes outside of Noah as a developmental talent. At NJPW Tanahashi Jam on June 29, 2025, he wrestled fellow rookie Katsuya Murashima into a time-limit draw.

In April 2025, Daiki Odashima would wrestle KENTA at the Kenoh Channel 3rd Anniversary show in Korakuen Hall, where KENTA would defeat Odashima. Odashima would then wrestle former Noah wrestler and 3 Time GHC Heavyweight Champion Jun Akiyama at Kenta Kobashi's Fortune Dream 10 event, which also took place at Korakuen Hall. Akiyama would also defeat Odashima. Tamon Honda appeared in Daiki Odashima's corner at Fortune Dream 10 to support his student.

Daiki Odashima would appear at Japanese Freelance wrestler Yuto Kikuchi's 10 year anniversary show, and Odashima would team with Eita and Shuji Kondo in a winning effort against Krampus members Grim, Orochi and Violence Dragon.

On March 21, 2026, Daiki Odashima would wrestle in Michinoku Pro where he would wrestle Kuu Kumagai in his debut match, defeating Kumagai. Kumagai was a Noah trainee who trained extensively alongside Daiki Odashima. Kumagai quit the Noah dojo in 2025, and would begin training in Michinoku Pro. Odashima would wrestle Kumagai the next day, teaming with Taro Nohashi, once again defeating Kumagai as well as his partner Ringo Yamaya.

== Championships and accomplishments ==
- Pro Wrestling Noah
  - GHC Junior Heavyweight Tag Team Championship (1 time) – with Daga
