= Team 2000X =

Professional wrestling stable

- Current logo of the stable (2024–present)

Stable
- Leader: Ozawa
- Members: See below
- Name: Team 2000X
- Former members: See below
- Debut: October 14, 2024
- Years active: 2024–present

Team 2000X is a villainous professional wrestling stable based in the Pro Wrestling Noah (Noah) promotion. It consists of second leader Ozawa, Yoshi Tatsu, Owadasan, Tadasuke, Takashi Sugiura, Knull, Masa Kitamiya, Jun Masaoka, Alpha Wolf, Kai Fujimura, and Yo-Hey. The stable represents an homage to the Team 2000 faction formerly based in New Japan Pro Wrestling in the early 2000s.

== History ==
=== Formation (2024) ===
At Destination 2024 on July 13, the Good Looking Guys (GLG) stable disbanded after their pre-scheduled dissolution match when former leader Jake Lee left Noah to join the Bullet Club War Dogs in New Japan Pro-Wrestling (NJPW). Jack Morris, who was a member of GLG, tried to confront Lee about his decision, but was attacked by Lee who turned heel in the process. Anthony Greene and LJ Cleary, who were also part of the stable, went their separate ways alongside Morris. At Sunny Voyage on September 30, Morris, Greene and Cleary faced each other in a three-way match. The match ended in a no contest after a masked man attacked the referee, shook Morris's hand and left the venue with him, as Morris stated that the masked man would reveal his identity on October 14. At Sunny Voyage on October 7, Jack Morris and Anthony Greene faced each other in a singles match that ended in a no contest after the same masked man attacked Greene. Daga came down and pretended to help Greene, only to join forces with Morris and the masked man. During the Star Navigation Premium: Akitoshi Saito Ridge Road Last Korakuen event on October 14, the masked man was revealed to be Yoshi Tatsu, and the stable was officially formed.

=== Jack Morris' leadership (2024–2025) ===
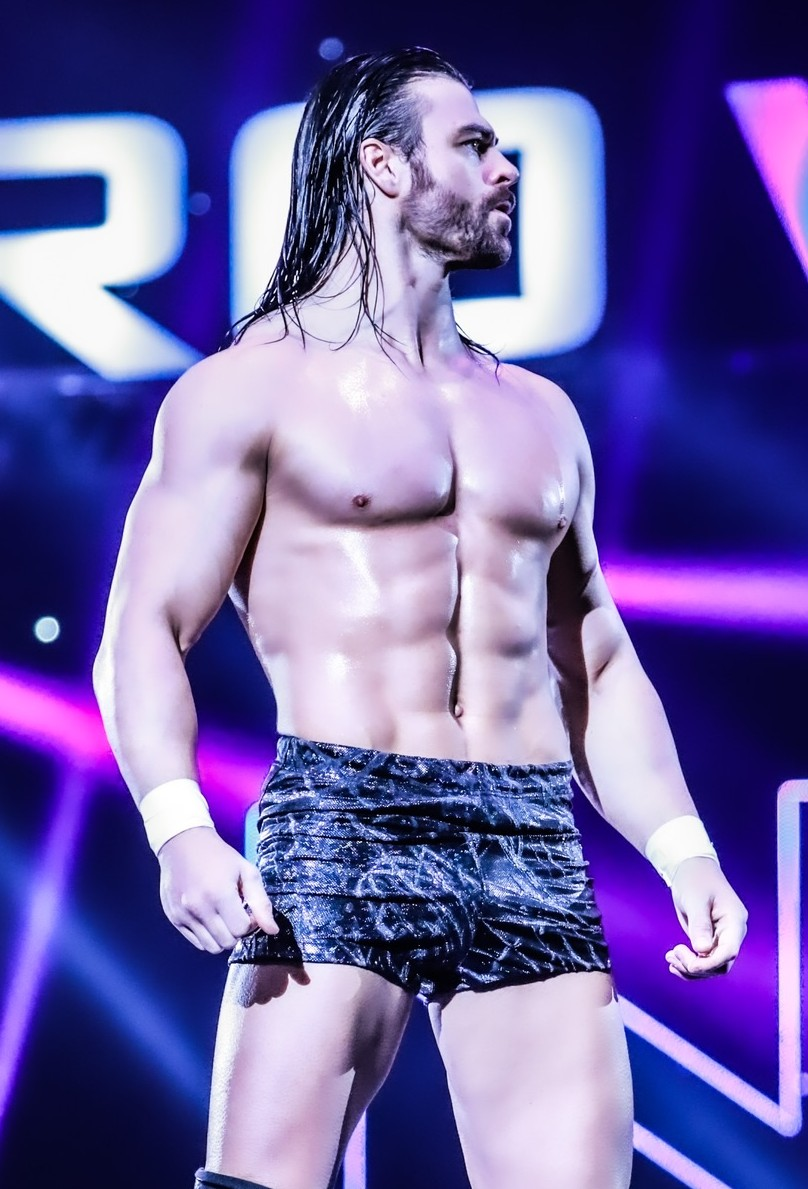
First leader of the stable, Jack Morris.

At Deathtiny on November 17, Taishi Ozawa turned on All Rebellion by attacking his very own former trainer Kaito Kiyomiya after the latter's successful defense of the GHC Heavyweight Championship against Takashi Sugiura, demanding a title match that was later scheduled to take place at Noah The New Year 2025 on January 1. WWE signed wrestler Omos was announced as a member of the stable on December 27, during the New Year event press conference. At the event, Daga lost the GHC Junior Heavyweight Championship to Eita, Jack Morris and Omos defeated Naomichi Marufuji and Takashi Sugiura to win the GHC Tag Team Championship, and Ozawa defeated Kaito Kiyomiya to become the GHC Heavyweight Champion.

On January 2, 2025, Tetsuya Endo of DDT Pro-Wrestling began his one-year stint in Pro Wrestling Noah. On January 11, at Star Navigation Premium 2025, he defeated Manabu Soya to win the GHC National Championship, and then joined Team 2000X. On January 25, Omos announced that he was leaving Noah to return to WWE and relinquished his GHC Tag Team Championship to Daga. However, the title was vacated on January 27 due to Noah not recognizing the title change. Daga and Morris refused to relinquish the titles. On February 11, Endo lost the GHC National Championship back to Manabu Soya. On March 2 at Memorial Voyage in Yokohama, Ozawa defeated Manabu Soya in a Winner Takes All Lumberjack Deathmatch to win the GHC National Championship and retain the GHC Heavyweight Championship, when during the match, Tadasuke turned on the Passionate Ratel's to join Team 2000X. Ozawa relinquished the GHC National Championship right after the bout concluded.

Tetsuya Endo would turn face and desert Team 2000X on the first night of Noah Star Navigation 2025, stating that he could not "follow [Team 2000X's] ways anymore", and issued a challenge to Ozawa for his title. Ozawa accepted, but made the match a Survival Three-Way match and called out Takashi Sugiura. The match was then made official for night two. On night two of Star Navigation 2025, during the match, Sugiura turned heel and attacked Endo with a steel chair. Endo would still eliminate Sugiura with a roll-up pin. Ozawa would ultimately pin Endo and retain his title. After the match, Ozawa stated that he recruited Sugiura with the specific intention of getting rid of Endo and replacing him. On the first night of the Noah New Departure 2025 event from July 19, Knull was revealed as the mystery tag partner of Jack Morris, Tadasuke and Owadasan as they defeated All Rebellion (Kaito Kiyomiya, Galeno, Alejandro and Harutoki) in eight-man tag team action. He was subsequently announced as the newest addition to the stable at the time. At Kawasaki Summer Voyage 2025 on August 11, after losing an eight-man tag team match, Ozawa, Daga and Knull attacked and expelled leader Jack Morris from the unit.

=== Ozawa's leadership (2025–present) ===
On September 23, 2025, Daga turned on the stable to save Daiki Odashima to protest the abuse of the latter. During the 2025 edition of the Noah Jr. Grand Prix, Jun Masaoka turned on Amakusa, costing him his quarterfinal match against Tadasuke to align with the faction. At Noah Cross Over in Sendai 2025 on November 21, Masa Kitamiya and Takashi Sugiura defeated Hank And Tank (Hank Walker and Tank Ledger) to win the GHC Tag Team Championship. At Noah The New Year 2026, Masa Kitamiya, Takashi Sugiura, Tadasuke and Jun Masaoka defeated Kazuyuki Fujita, Minoru Suzuki, Shuhei Taniguchi and Junta Miyawaki, while Ozawa unsuccessfully challenged Yoshiki Inamura for the GHC Heavyweight Championship. Alpha Wolf defeated Dragon Bane to win the GHC National Championship, then turned on the latter to join the faction the same night. On the first night of the Noah Legacy Rise 2026 from January 11, Alpha Wolf, Jun Masaoka, Tadasuke and Takashi Sugiura defeated Alejandro, Harutoki, Kai Fujimura and Kaito Kiyomiya in eight-man tag team competition. During the match, Fujimura attacked Alejandro, thus handing Team 2000X the win. Fujimura defected All Rebellion and joined the stable in the process. On the fourth night of the same event from August 10, 2026, Tadasuke defeated Yo-Hey by disqualification after Team 2000X members attacked Yo-Hey. The latter then attacked his Passionate Ratel's stablemates after they tried to make the save for him and joined Team 2000X.

== Members ==
Team 2000X
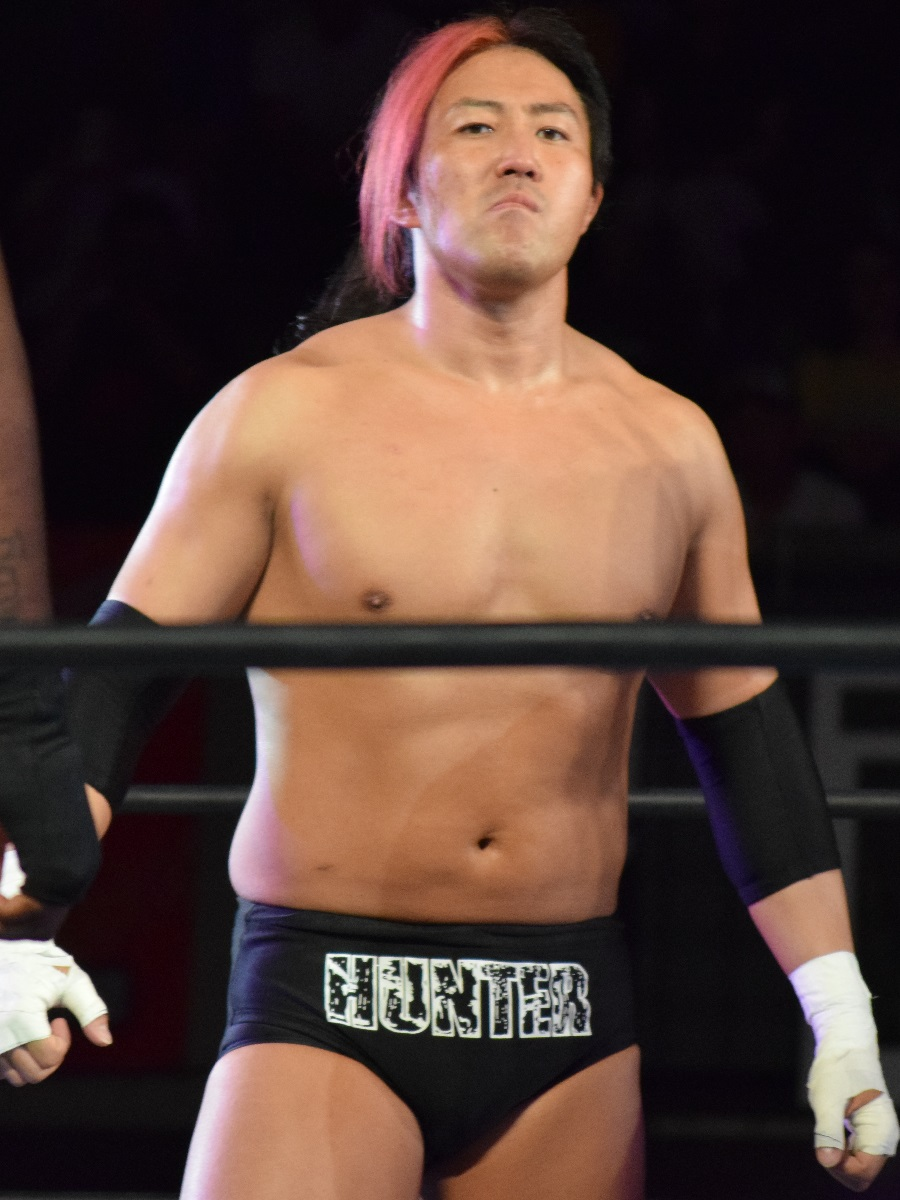
Yoshi Tatsu

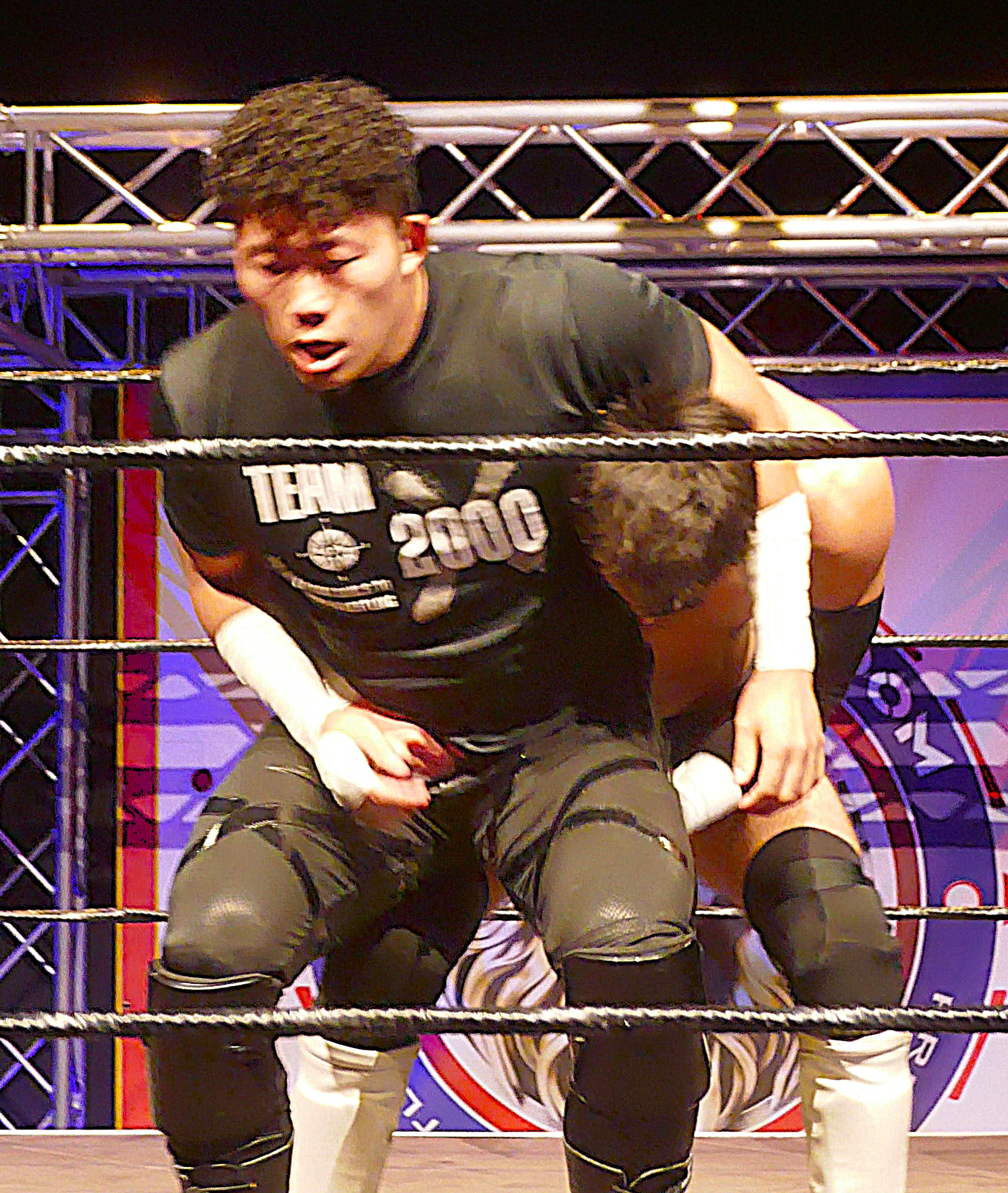
Owadasan

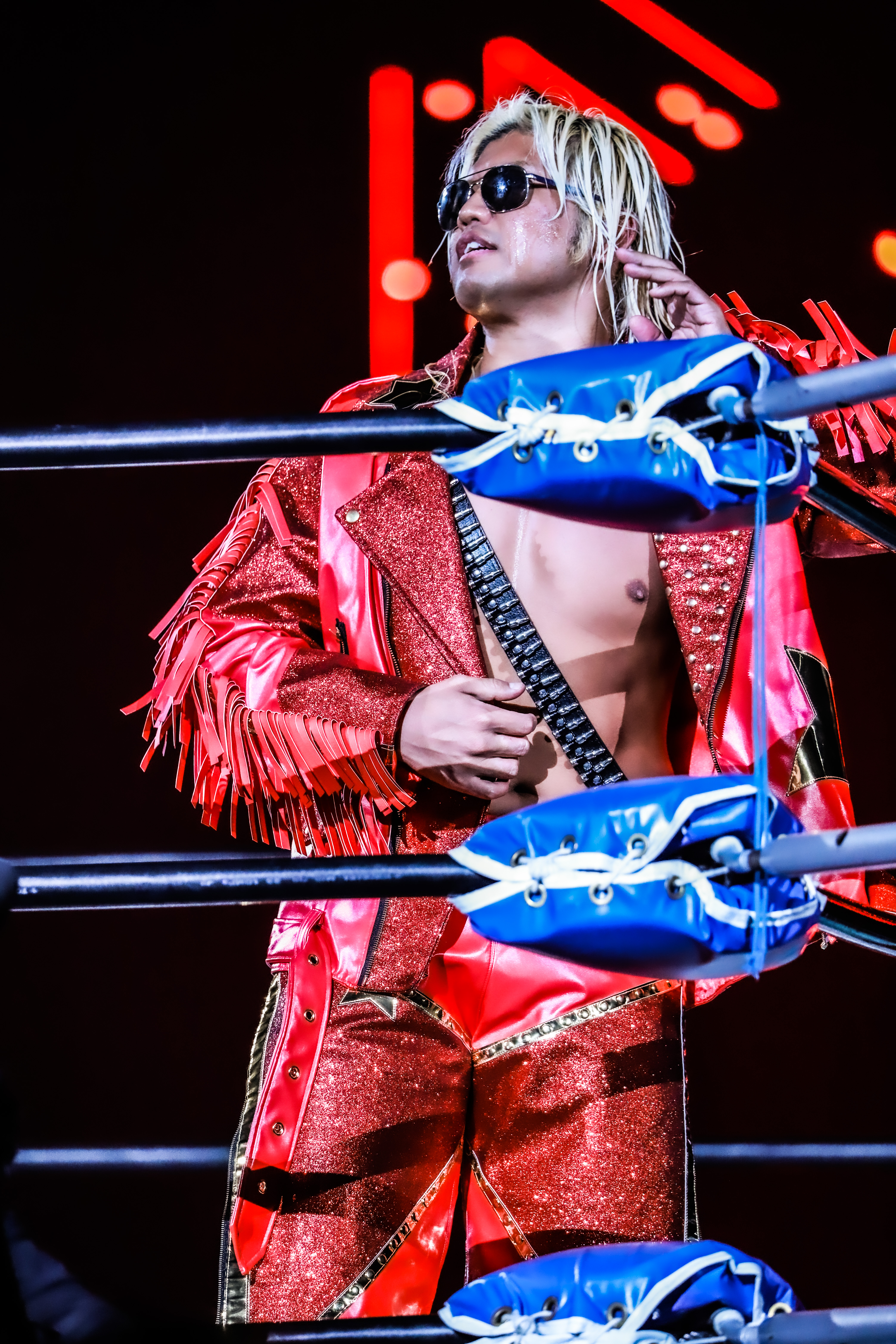
Tadasuke

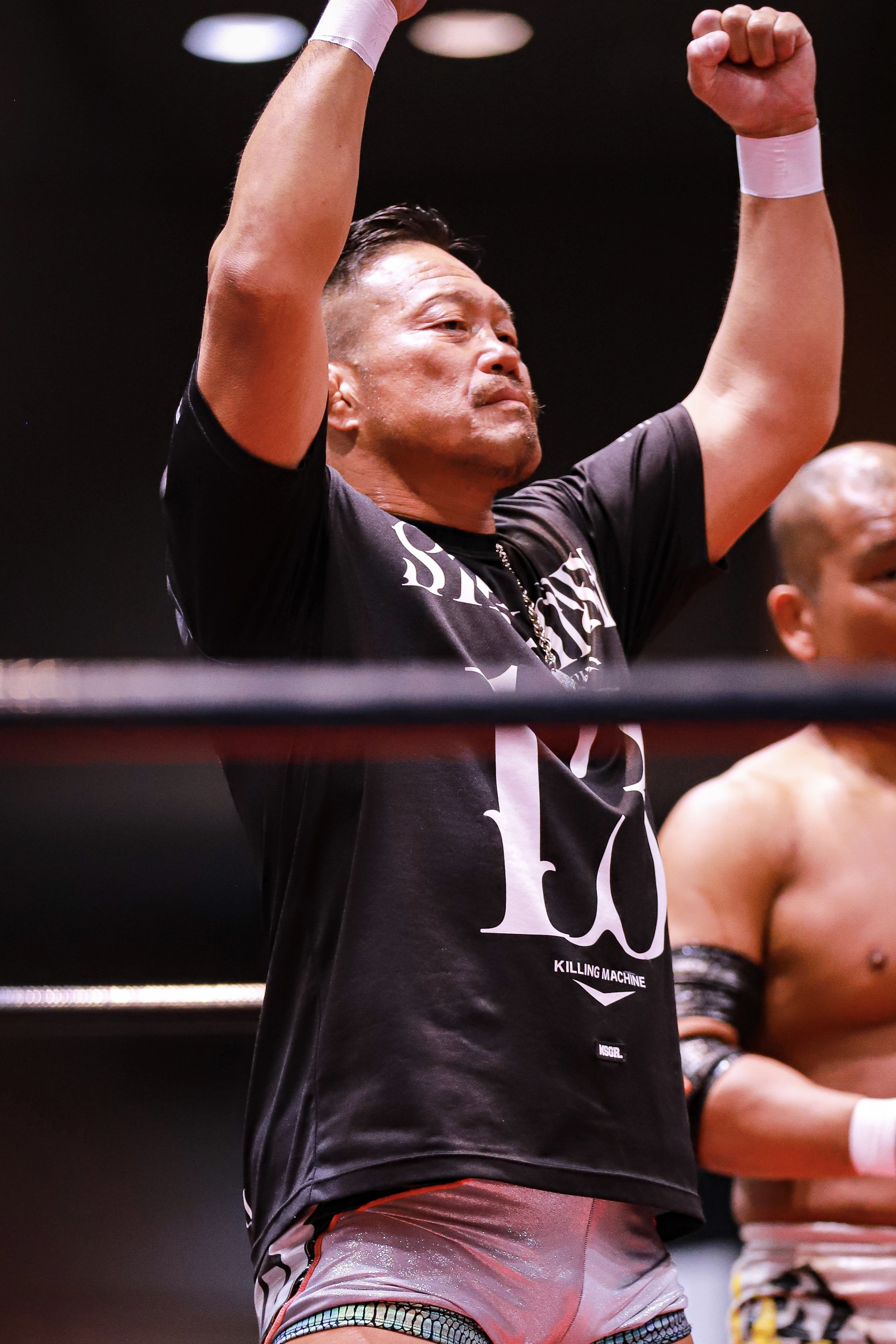
Takashi Sugiura

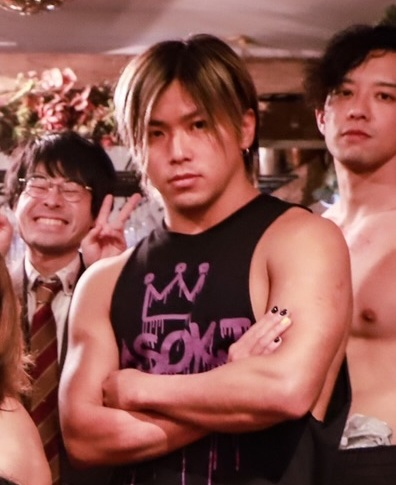
Jun Masaoka

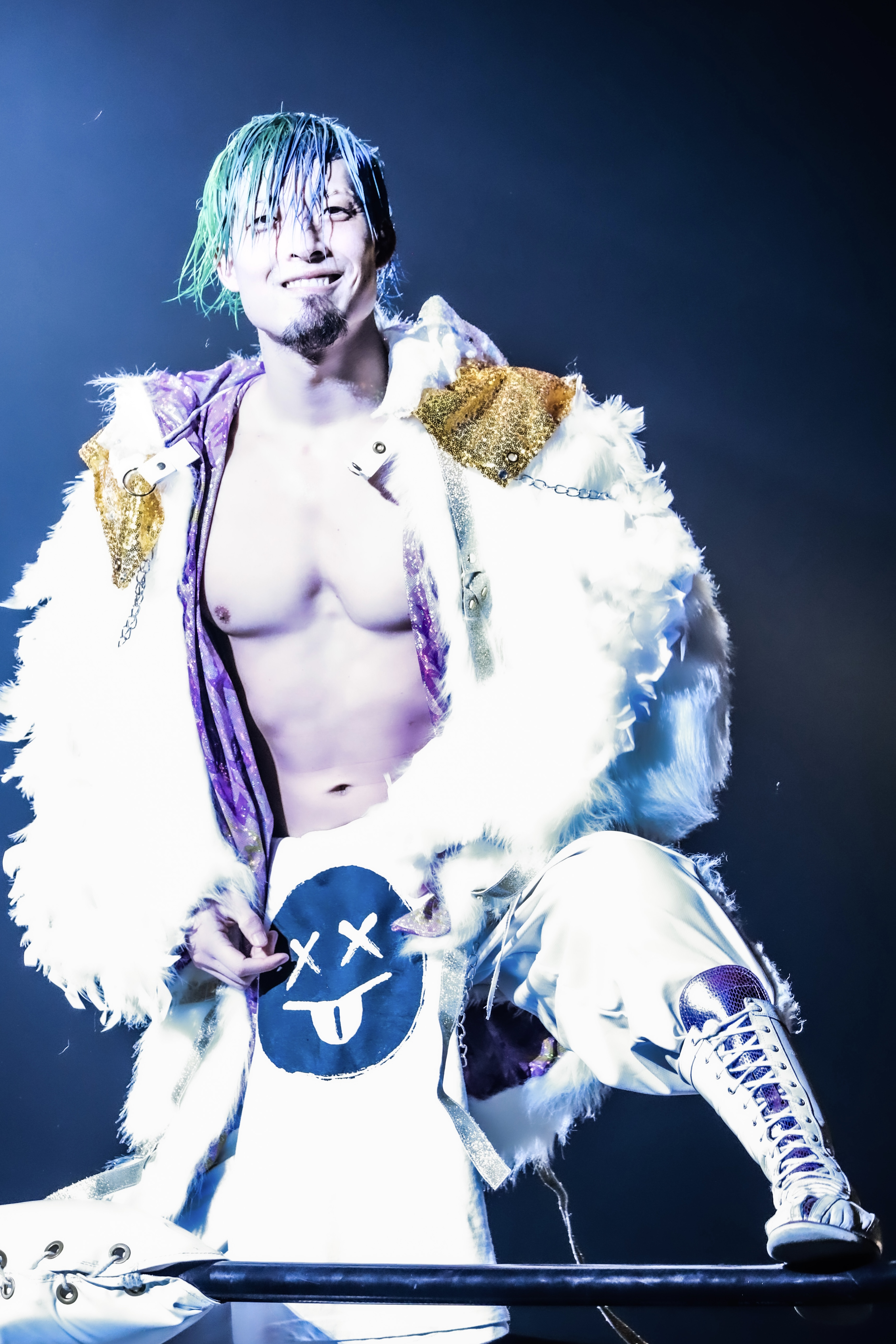
Yo-Hey

*	Founding member
I-II	Leader(s)

=== Current ===
Member		Joined
Yoshi Tatsu	*	October 14, 2024
Ozawa	II	November 17, 2024
Owadasan		January 2, 2025
Tadasuke		March 2, 2025
Takashi Sugiura		June 3, 2025
Knull		July 19, 2025
Masa Kitamiya		August 3, 2025
Jun Masaoka		November 16, 2025
Alpha Wolf		January 1, 2026
Kai Fujimura		January 11, 2026
Yo-Hey		August 10, 2026

=== Former ===
Member		Joined	Left
Omos		December 27, 2024	January 25, 2025 (Note: Omos never officially left the group. This date represents his last appearance as a member.)
Tetsuya Endo		January 11, 2025	May 18, 2025
Jack Morris	*I	October 14, 2024	August 11, 2025
Daga	*	October 14, 2024	September 23, 2025

== Championships and accomplishments ==
- Pro Wrestling Noah
  - GHC Heavyweight Championship (1 time) – Ozawa
  - GHC National Championship (3 times) – Endo (1), Ozawa (1) and Wolf (1)
  - GHC Junior Heavyweight Championship (2 times, current) – Daga (1) and Fujimura (1, current)
  - GHC Junior Heavyweight Tag Team Championship (1 time, current) – Masaoka and Yo-Hey
  - GHC Tag Team Championship (4 times) – Morris and Omos (1), Morris and Daga (1), Kitamiya and Sugiura (2)
  - N-1 Victory (2 times)
    - 2025 – Kitamiya
    - 2026 – Ozawa
- Pro Wrestling Illustrated
  - Ranked Ozawa No. 26 of the top 500 singles wrestlers in the PWI 500 of 2025
  - Ranked Daga No. 104 of the top 500 singles wrestlers in the PWI 500 of 2024
  - Ranked Morris No. 341 of the top 500 singles wrestlers in the PWI 500 of 2024
