= GHC Junior Heavyweight Championship =

Professional wrestling championship

- Current championship design

Details
- Promotion: CyberFight
- Brand: Pro Wrestling Noah
- Date established: June 24, 2001
- Current champion: Kai Fujimura
- Date won: August 10, 2026
Statistics
- First champion: Yoshinobu Kanemaru
- Most reigns: Yoshinobu Kanemaru (7 reigns)
- Longest reign: Taiji Ishimori (405 days)
- Shortest reign: Makoto Hashi (1 day)
- Oldest champion: Yoshinari Ogawa (53 years, 2 months and 2 days)
- Youngest champion: Katsuhiko Nakajima (20 years and 11 months)

The Global Honored Crown (GHC) Junior Heavyweight Championship (Japanese: GHCジュニアヘビー級王座, Hepburn: GHC Junia Hebī-kyū Ōza) is a professional wrestling title in Japanese promotion Pro Wrestling Noah, contested exclusively among junior heavyweight (<100 kg) wrestlers. It was created in 2001 when Yoshinobu Kanemaru defeated Juventud Guerrera in a 12-man tournament final. In addition to Japan, the title has also been defended in the United States, United Kingdom and Germany. Kai Fujimura is the current champion in his first reign. He won the title by defeating Eita at Legacy Rise: Night 4 on August 10, 2026.

== Tournament ==
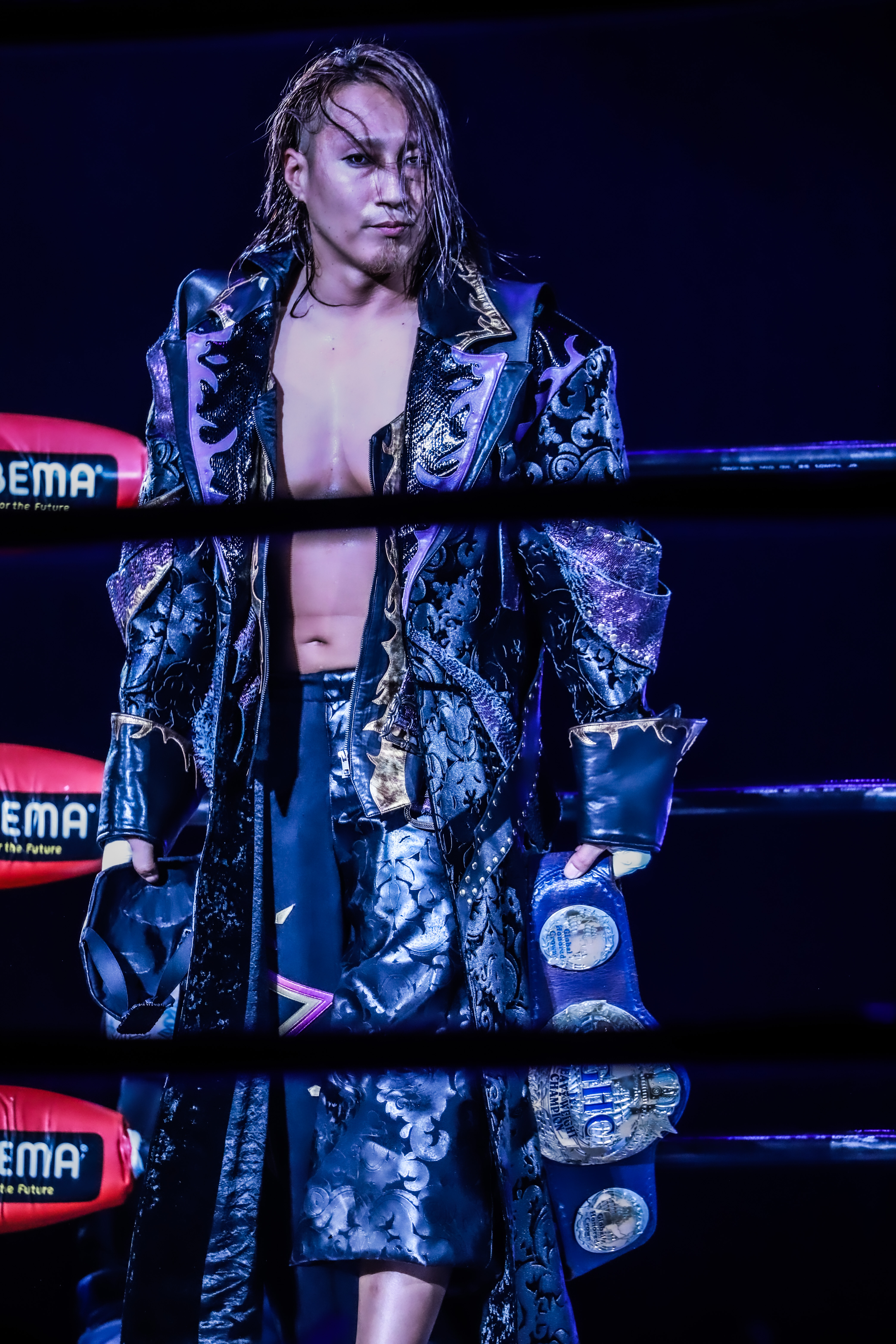
Five-time champion Hayata with the current design of the title in 2022

Noah held a 10-man tournament to crown the first champion, held over its month-long, 11-event Navigation for the Bright Destination tour. The tour was held from June 9 through June 24, 2001.

Round 1 June 9 & 15
8	Path Finder	Pin
9	Kenta Kobayashi	8:27
7	Satoru Asako	Pin
10	Matt Murphy	11:21

Round 2 June 16, 17, 20 & 21
Yoshinobu Kanemaru	Pin
Path Finder	12:15
Tsuyoshi Kikuchi	Pin
B. J. Whitmer	7:12
Makoto Hashi	Pin
Naomichi Marufuji	15:02
Satoru Asako	Pin
Juventud Guerrera	11:04

Semifinals; June 23
Yoshinobu Kanemaru	Pin
Tsuyoshi Kikuchi	13:34
Naomichi Marufuji	Pin
Juventud Guerrera	19:02

Final; June 24
Yoshinobu Kanemaru	Pin
Juventud Guerrera	17:17

== Title history ==
Key
No.	Overall reign number
Reign	Reign number for the specific champion
Days	Number of days held
Defenses	Number of successful defenses
<1	Reign lasted less than a day
+	Current reign is changing daily

No.	Champion	Championship change			Reign statistics			Notes	Ref.
No.	Champion	Date	Event	Location	Reign	Days	Defenses	Notes	Ref.
1	Yoshinobu Kanemaru	June 24, 2001	Navigation for the Bright Destination	Nagoya, Japan	1	117	2	Defeated Juventud Guerrera in a tournament final.	
2	Tatsuhito Takaiwa	October 19, 2001	Tug of War	Yokohama, Japan	1	51	1		
3	Naomichi Marufuji	December 9, 2001	Navigation in Raging Ocean	Tokyo, Japan	1	119	1		
4	Makoto Hashi	April 7, 2002	Come and Watch in Ariake	Tokyo, Japan	1	1	0		
—	Vacated	April 8, 2002	—	—	—	—	—	Hashi refused the title after winning by referee stoppage due to Marufuji injuring his knee.	
5	Yoshinobu Kanemaru	May 26, 2002	Navigation with Breeze	Sapporo, Japan	2	308	3	Defeated Kenta in a tournament final to win the vacant title.	
6	Michael Modest	March 30, 2003	Encountering Navigation	Fukuoka, Japan	1	166	2		
7	Takashi Sugiura	September 12, 2003	Navigation Over the Date Line	Tokyo, Japan	1	114	2		
8	Jushin Thunder Liger	January 4, 2004	Wrestling World 2004	Tokyo, Japan	1	188	5	This was a New Japan Pro-Wrestling (NJPW) event.	
9	Yoshinobu Kanemaru	July 10, 2004	Departure 2004	Tokyo, Japan	3	373	5		
10	Kenta	July 18, 2005	Destiny 2005	Tokyo, Japan	1	321	6		
11	Takashi Sugiura	June 4, 2006	Northern Navigation	Sapporo, Japan	2	202	1		
12	Tatsuhito Takaiwa	December 23, 2006	SEMful Gift in Differ	Tokyo, Japan	2	126	2	This was a Pro Wrestling Sem event.	
13	Mushiking Terry	April 28, 2007	Spring Navigation	Tokyo, Japan	1	182	0		
14	Yoshinobu Kanemaru	October 27, 2007	Autumn Navigation	Tokyo, Japan	4	323	5		
15	Bryan Danielson	September 14, 2008	The Tokyo Summit	Tokyo, Japan	1	29	1	This was a Ring of Honor (ROH) event.	
16	Kenta	October 13, 2008	Autumn Navigation	Hiroshima, Japan	2	121	3		
17	Katsuhiko Nakajima	February 11, 2009	Take the Dream Vol. 7	Tokyo, Japan	1	18	0	This was a Kensuke Office event.	
18	Kenta	March 1, 2009	Second Navigation	Tokyo, Japan	3	243	3		
—	Vacated	October 30, 2009	—	—	—	—	—	Vacated due to Kenta suffering a knee injury.	
19	Yoshinobu Kanemaru	October 31, 2009	Autumn Navigation	Tokyo, Japan	5	400	6	Defeated Jyushin Thunder Liger in the finals of the Junior Heavyweight League to win the vacant title.	
20	Kotaro Suzuki	December 5, 2010	Winter Navigation	Tokyo, Japan	2	292	7	Suzuki was formerly known as Mushiking Terry.	
21	Katsuhiko Nakajima	September 23, 2011	Shiny Navigation	Tokyo, Japan	2	9	0		
—	Vacated	October 2, 2011	—	—	—	—	—	Vacated after Nakajima underwent surgery for acute appendicitis.	
22	Ricky Marvin	October 16, 2011	Navigation Sunday 2011 in Korakuen	Tokyo, Japan	1	<1	0	Defeated Satoshi Kajiwara to win the vacant title.	
—	Vacated	October 16, 2011	—	—	—	—	—	Marvin refused the title, declaring that he wanted to win it by defeating Katsuhiko Nakajima.	
23	Katsuhiko Nakajima	November 27, 2011	Great Voyage 2011 in Tokyo Vol. 4	Tokyo, Japan	3	164	4	Defeated Ricky Marvin to win the vacant title.	
24	Yoshinobu Kanemaru	May 9, 2012	The Navigation in May 2012	Tokyo, Japan	6	143	3		
25	Shuji Kondo	September 29, 2012	The Navigation Saturday 2012 in Korakuen	Tokyo, Japan	1	120	3		
26	Taiji Ishimori	January 27, 2013	Great Voyage 2013 in Osaka	Osaka, Japan	1	405	10		
27	Daisuke Harada	March 8, 2014	Great Voyage 2014 in Tokyo	Tokyo, Japan	1	273	7		
28	Atsushi Kotoge	December 6, 2014	Great Voyage 2014 in Tokyo Vol. 3	Tokyo, Japan	1	99	1		
29	Taichi	March 15, 2015	Great Voyage 2015 in Tokyo	Tokyo, Japan	1	283	4		
30	Taiji Ishimori	December 23, 2015	Destiny 2015	Tokyo, Japan	2	63	1		
31	Yoshinobu Kanemaru	February 24, 2016	The Second Navigation 2016	Tokyo, Japan	7	212	4		
32	Atsushi Kotoge	September 23, 2016	Shiny Navigation 2016	Tokyo, Japan	2	94	3		
—	Vacated	December 26, 2016	—	—	—	—	—	Vacated due to Kotoge moving to the heavyweight division.	
33	Hajime Ohara	January 7, 2017	The First Navigation 2017	Tokyo, Japan	1	140	2	Defeated Taiji Ishimori to win the vacant title.	
34	Hayata	May 27, 2017	Navigation With Breeze 2017	Osaka, Japan	1	29	0		
35	Taiji Ishimori	June 25, 2017	Great Voyage 2017 in Fukushima	Kōriyama, Japan	3	98	1		
36	Daisuke Harada	October 1, 2017	Great Voyage 2017 in Yokohama Vol. 2	Yokohama, Japan	2	394	6		
37	Kotaro Suzuki	October 30, 2018	Global League 2018; Day 1	Tokyo, Japan	3	47	2		
38	Daisuke Harada	December 16, 2018	Great Voyage in Yokohama Vol. 2	Yokohama, Japan	3	84	1		
39	Minoru Tanaka	March 10, 2019	Great Voyage 2019 in Yokohama	Yokohama, Japan	1	147	1		
40	Hayata	August 4, 2019	Departure 2019	Tokyo, Japan	2	153	3		
41	Yoshinari Ogawa	January 4, 2020	New Sunrise	Tokyo, Japan	1	106	1		
42	Kotaro Suzuki	April 19, 2020	Noah the Spirit	Tokyo, Japan	4	203	5		
43	Daisuke Harada	November 8, 2020	Premium Prelude 2020	Tokyo, Japan	4	96	2		
44	Seiki Yoshioka	February 12, 2021	Destination 2021: Back to Budōkan	Tokyo, Japan	1	30	0		
45	Atsushi Kotoge	March 14, 2021	Great Voyage 2021 in Fukuoka	Fukuoka, Japan	3	105	2		
46	Hayata	June 27, 2021	Muta The World	Fukuoka, Japan	3	197	8		
47	Daisuke Harada	January 10, 2022	N-Innovation Day 3: U-Cup Special	Yokohama, Japan	5	62	2		
48	Eita	March 13, 2022	Great Voyage 2022 in Yokohama	Yokohama, Japan	1	47	0		
49	Hayata	April 29, 2022	Majestic 2022: N Innovation	Tokyo, Japan	4	184	5		
50	Ninja Mack	October 30, 2022	Ariake Triumph: The Return	Tokyo, Japan	1	11	0	This match was stopped after Hayata suffered a legitimate elbow injury and was unable to continue.	
51	Dante Leon	November 10, 2022	Global Honored Crown 2022	Tokyo, Japan	1	43	0		
52	Amakusa	December 23, 2022	N Innovation 2022	Tokyo, Japan	1	114	3		
53	Hayata	April 16, 2023	Green Journey in Sendai 2023	Sendai, Japan	5	202	3		
54	Daga	November 4, 2023	Demolition Stage in Niigata	Niigata, Japan	1	252	6		
55	Amakusa	July 13, 2024	Destination 2024	Niigata, Japan	2	50	0		
56	Daga	September 1, 2024	N-1 Victory; Night 9	Osaka, Japan	2	122	1		
57	Eita	January 1, 2025	The New Year 2025	Tokyo, Japan	2	122	3	This was a Two-out-of-three falls match, which Eita won 2–1.	
58	Yo-Hey	May 3, 2025	Memorial Voyage in Kokugikan	Tokyo, Japan	1	128	4		
59	Hiromu Takahashi	September 8, 2025	N-1 Victory; Night 1	Tokyo, Japan	1	115	2		
60	Amakusa	January 1, 2026	The New Year 2026	Tokyo, Japan	3	121	2		
61	Dragon Bane	May 2, 2026	Spring Mayhem	Tokyo, Japan	1	49	0		
62	Eita	June 20, 2026	Eita's 15th Anniversary Show	Agematsu, Japan	3	51	2		
63	Kai Fujimura	August 10, 2026	Legacy Rise (Night 4)	Tokyo, Japan	1	76+	2		

== Combined reigns ==
As of October 25, 2026.

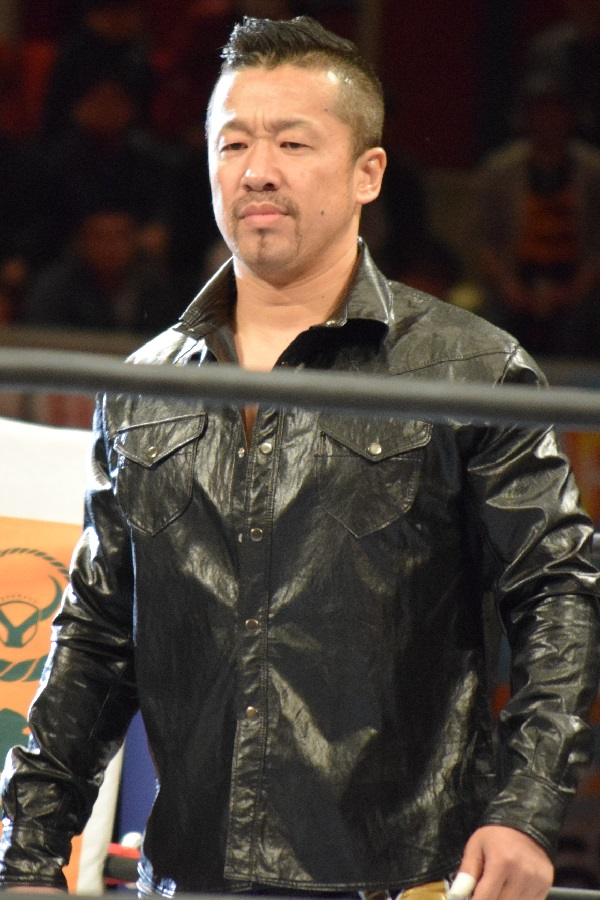
Inaugural and record seven-time champion Yoshinobu Kanemaru also holds the records for longest combined reign at 1,876 days and most combined defenses at 28

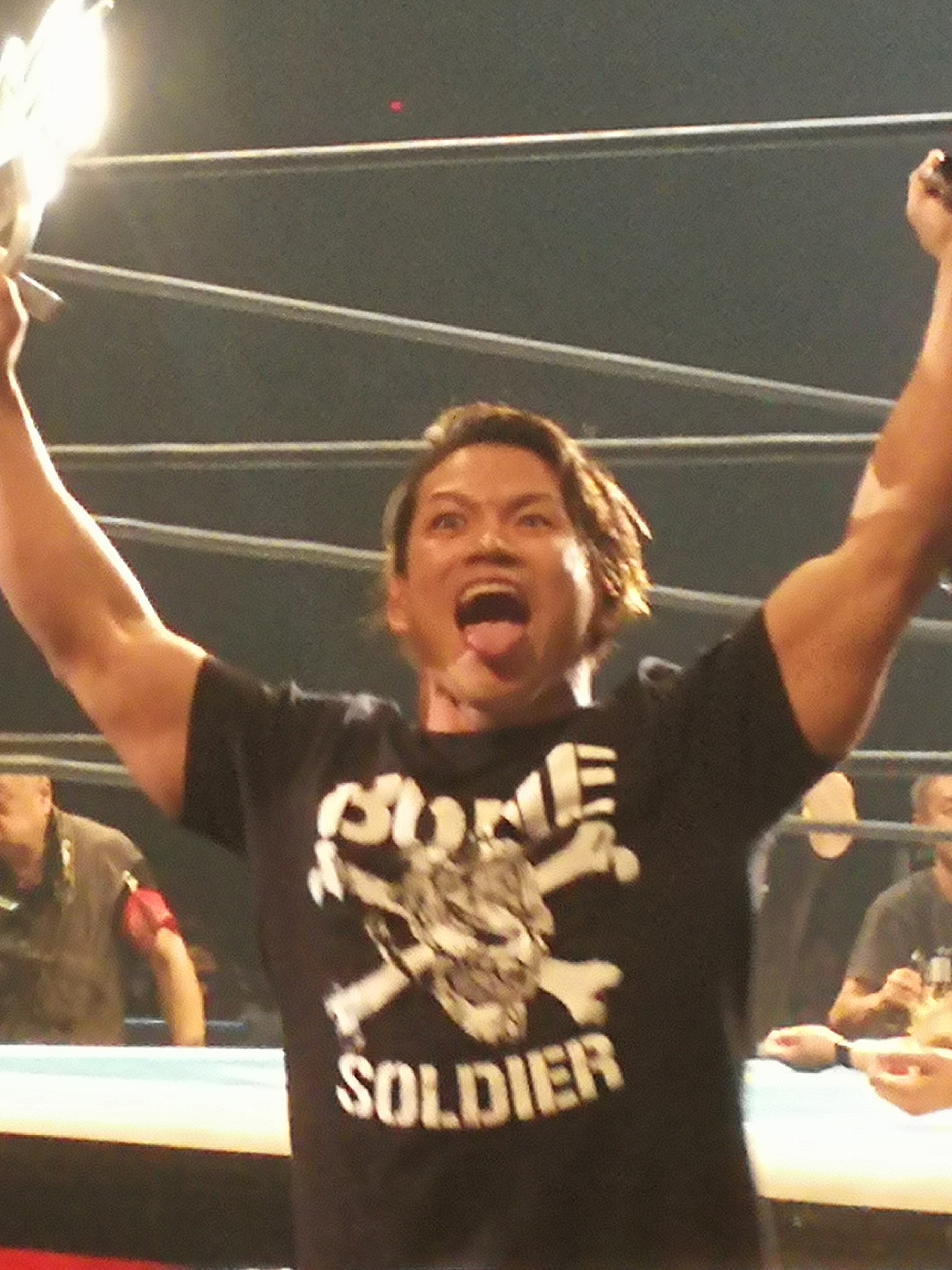
Three-time champion Taiji Ishimori holds the records for longest reign at 405 days and most defenses in one reign at 10

†	Indicates the current champion

Rank	Wrestler	No. of reigns	Combined defenses	Combined days
1	Yoshinobu Kanemaru	7	28	1,876
2	Daisuke Harada	5	18	909
3	Hayata	5	19	765
4	Mushiking Terry/Kotaro Suzuki	4	14	724
5	Kenta	3	12	685
6	Taiji Ishimori	3	12	566
7	Daga	2	7	373
8	Takashi Sugiura	2	3	316
9	Atsushi Kotoge	3	6	298
10	Amakusa	3	5	285
11	Taichi	1	4	283
12	Eita	3	5	220
13	Katsuhiko Nakajima	3	4	191
14	Jyushin Thunder Liger	1	5	188
15	Tatsuhito Takaiwa	2	3	177
16	Michael Modest	1	2	166
17	Minoru Tanaka	1	1	147
18	Hajime Ohara	1	2	140
19	Yo-Hey	1	4	128
20	Shuji Kondo	1	3	120
21	Naomichi Marufuji	1	1	119
22	Hiromu Takahashi	1	2	115
23	Yoshinari Ogawa	1	1	106
24	Kai Fujimura †	1	2	76+
25	Dragon Bane	1	0	49
26	Dante Leon	1	0	43
27	Seiki Yoshioka	1	0	30
28	Bryan Danielson	1	1	29
29	Ninja Mack	1	0	11
30	Makoto Hashi	1	0	1
31	Ricky Marvin	1	0	<1

== See also ==
- GHC Heavyweight Championship
- GHC National Championship
- GHC Tag Team Championship
- GHC Junior Heavyweight Tag Team Championship
- GHC Hardcore Championship

== Belt design ==
The standard Championship belt has three plates on a blue leather strap.
