= Pro Wrestling Noah =

Japanese professional wrestling promotion

- Pro Wrestling Noah logo since February 2021
- Founded: June 16, 2000
- Style: Royal Road with Ark
- Headquarters: Shinjuku, Tokyo, Japan
- Founder: Mitsuharu Misawa
- Parent: CyberFight (CyberAgent)
- Sister: DDT Pro-Wrestling; Tokyo Joshi Pro Wrestling
- Split from: All Japan Pro Wrestling
- Website: noah.co.jp

Pro Wrestling Noah (プロレスリング・ノア, Puroresuringu Noa) (stylised as Pro Wrestling NOAH) is a Japanese professional wrestling promotion. Noah was founded in 2000 by former All Japan Pro Wrestling (AJPW) wrestler and President Mitsuharu Misawa; Misawa had led a mass exodus in which 24 of AJPW's 26 contracted wrestlers and most of its backstage workers left the promotion to form Noah.

Noah held its first shows in August 2000, and established the Global Honored Crown as the in-house governing body for its collection of championships. Throughout its 26-year history, Noah has had working relationships with New Japan Pro-Wrestling (NJPW), All Japan Pro Wrestling (AJPW), Ring of Honor (ROH), Total Nonstop Action Wrestling (TNA), Lucha Libre AAA Worldwide (AAA), All Elite Wrestling (AEW), Big Japan Pro Wrestling (BJW) and World Wrestling Entertainment (WWE), in which the latter now has a working relationship with its wrestlers from the NXT brand. In January 2020, the company was purchased by CyberAgent, parent company of DDT Pro-Wrestling, with DDT's executives taking over Noah's operations and Noah's content appearing on DDT's streaming service Wrestle Universe.

== History ==
=== Noah under Misawa (2000–2009) ===
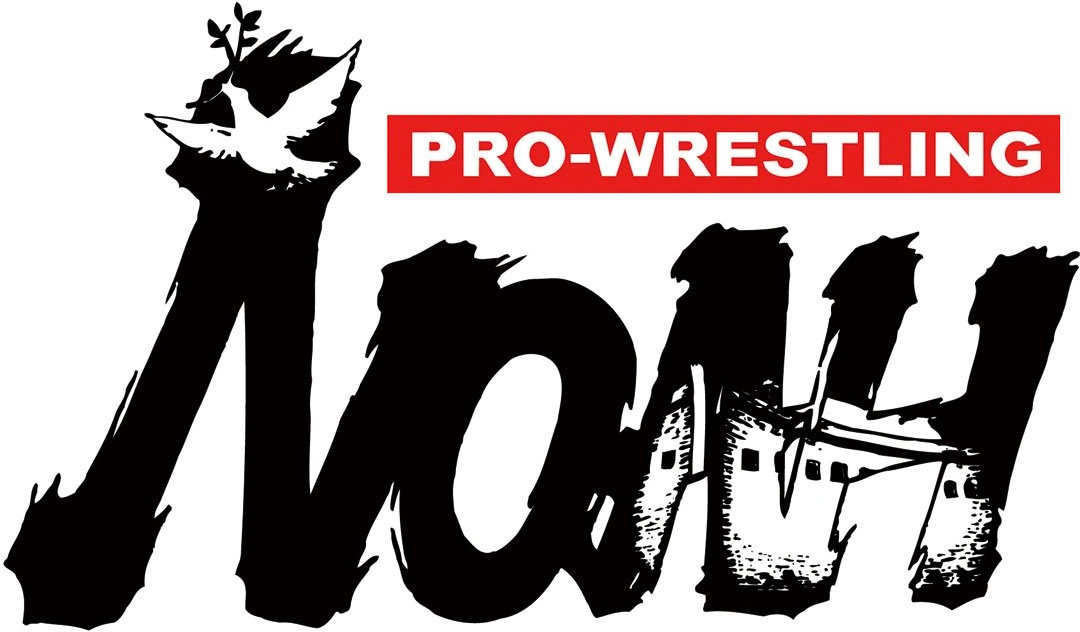
Logo of Noah (2000-2019)

In January 1999, AJPW founder and promoter Giant Baba died, leaving the company in the hands of his widow Motoko Baba as owner and Misawa as president. However, disheartened with Motoko Baba's proposed direction for the company, Misawa departed the promotion on May 28, 2000 to form a new promotion called Pro Wrestling Noah. All but two native stars (Masanobu Fuchi and Toshiaki Kawada) and eight gaijin (Maunakea Mossman, Johnny Smith, George Hines, Mike Barton, Jim Steele, Mike Rotunda, Stan Hansen and "Dr. Death" Steve Williams) followed Misawa. The promotion's name alludes to the Biblical story of Noah, in which the people and animals in the ark survive the flood and make a new beginning in the world, a story which was seen as a parallel to the wrestlers' departure from AJPW. Noah's original logo, an ark with a dove holding an olive branch, referred to this.

Pro Wrestling Noah is essentially a continuation of AJPW's promotional system in the 1990s, with a slight leeway to allow wrestlers from other promotions to compete, which is something that Giant Baba had forbid. Noah also features a strong junior heavyweight division, which was something that AJPW had been relatively lacking in the 1990s due to lack of pushes for the younger stars (such as Yoshinobu Kanemaru, Kenta and Naomichi Marufuji, who quickly became Noah's junior aces).

October 12, 2007 Baseball Magazine Sha, the publisher of Puroresu Shukan released Noah trading cards.

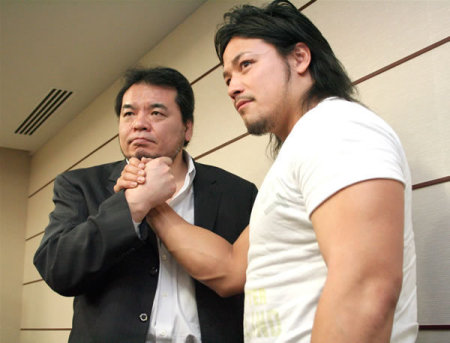
Mitsuharu Misawa and Go Shiozaki

The Wrestling Observer named Noah as the best promotion in 2004 and 2005, as well as naming the promotion's weekly television show Power Hour the best weekly television show in 2003.

On June 13, 2009, Misawa teamed with Go Shiozaki against Akitoshi Saito and Bison Smith at Hiroshima Green Arena. After taking a belly to back suplex from Saito, Misawa lost consciousness and was taken to a hospital. He was pronounced dead in the hospital at 10:10 p.m. JST due to spinal damage. On June 27, 2009, Akira Taue was named as Misawa's successor, taking over as President of Pro Wrestling Noah. Also in 2009, Noah lost their weekly television show on Nippon TV.

=== Noah after Misawa (2009–present) ===
In March 2012, it was revealed that Noah management had ties to a yakuza crime syndicate, which resulted in the promotion demoting General Manager Ryu Nakata and Counselor Haruka Eigen and enforcing new anti-yakuza protocols; Noah also lost its TV show as part of the fallout.

On December 4, 2012, Noah released Kenta Kobashi from his contract, reportedly leading to Atsushi Aoki, Go Shiozaki, Jun Akiyama, Kotaro Suzuki and Yoshinobu Kanemaru all announcing that they were not going to re-sign with the promotion after their own contracts expired in January 2013. On December 19, Noah confirmed that the five men had indeed refused to re-sign with the promotion and would be wrestling their final matches for the promotion on December 23 and 24. The following month, all five men joined AJPW. Kobashi returned to wrestle his retirement match in a Noah ring on May 11, 2013, at Final Burning in Budokan.

On May 12 at Noah's "New Chapter" show held at Korakuen Hall in Tokyo, Akira Taue announced the signings of Daisuke Harada, Mikey Nicholls and Shane Haste of The Mighty Don't Kneel (TMDK) as full-time members of the promotion. Taue also announced his retirement from in-ring competition to focus on his duties as the Chairman of the promotion and his retirement match would take place on December 7, 2013 at the Ariake Coliseum. On April 30, 2014, Noah's arguably biggest star and ace Kenta announced his resignation from the promotion to sign with WWE.

In early 2015, NJPW wrestler Jado took over as the new head booker of Noah. On April 21, one of Noah's bigger stars, Takeshi Morishima, was forced to retire from professional wrestling due to issues with his blood. On December 24, 2015, Noah announced the signing of freelancer Katsuhiko Nakajima. Four days later, Noah announced the departures of Mikey Nicholls, Shane Haste and Takeshi Morishima, following their contracts with the promotion expiring at the end of the year. On June 13, 2016, freelancer Go Shiozaki officially re-signed with Noah, three and a half years after his resignation from the promotion.

On November 1, 2016, it was announced that Noah had been sold to IT development company Estbee, Co, Ltd. As a result, former AJPW president Masayuki Uchida took over as the new Noah president. On November 7, Estbee officially changed its name to "Noah Global Entertainment kabushiki gaisha". On December 27, Noah announced the relocating of its offices from Ariake, Tokyo to Kanda-Misakichō due to Differ Ariake's scheduled closing in June 2018. At the end of 2016, NJPW pulled all of its wrestlers, including the entire Suzuki-gun stable, from Noah with reports stating that the relationship between the two promotions had turned "extremely sour". Having lost the NJPW relationship, Noah's attendance numbers went down by 29% during the first four months of 2017. On February 7, 2017, Noah announced a business alliance with American promotion Total Nonstop Action Wrestling (TNA), which was extended in July, after TNA had been renamed Global Force Wrestling (GFW). In March 2017, Noah formed another partnership with Canadian promotion Border City Wrestling (BCW).

On February 1, 2019, Noah was purchased by Lidet Entertainment, acquiring a 75% stake in the company. This was followed the next month by the first major rebranding in company history. Pro Wrestling Noah not only changed their logo but also replaced the green mat with a white canvas.

On July 26, 2019, Major League Wrestling announced a working agreement with Pro Wrestling Noah, which would include a talent-exchange agreement and content collaboration between the two promotions.

On December 5, 2019, it was announced that Noah and the Mexico-based International Wrestling Revolution Group had entered into a talent-sharing partnership.

In January 2020, Noah was acquired by CyberAgent, parent company of DDT Pro Wrestling. DDT's President Sanshiro Takagi was named the President of Pro Wrestling Noah and Naomichi Marufuji the Vice President. Noah's events began airing on DDT's streaming service DDT Universe starting with Noah Global Jr. League 2020 on January 30. On July 27, 2020, it was announced Noah and DDT would merge in a new company, CyberFight. Both companies would run as separate brands under the CyberFight banner.

On November 19, 2021 Noah re-established its relationship with NJPW with Noah wrestlers being involved at the third night of NJPW's Wrestle Kingdom 16 event, with a portion of proceeds donated to the Japanese Red Cross.

On December 15, 2023, Noah was announced as one of the founding members of the United Japan Pro-Wrestling alliance, a joint effort to further develop professional wrestling in Japan through promotion and organization, with Seiji Sakaguchi being named as the chairman of the project.

== Championships ==
Similar to New Japan Pro-Wrestling's International Wrestling Grand Prix (IWGP), Noah has its own title governing body, the Global Honored Crown (GHC) system.

=== Current championships ===
==== Singles ====
Championship	Current champion(s)	Reign	Date won	Days held	Successful defenses	Location	Notes	Ref.
GHC Heavyweight Championship	Tetsuya Naito	1	August 9, 2026	86	1	Tokyo, Japan	Defeated Shane Haste at Legacy Rise: Night 3	
GHC National Championship	Luis Mante	1	October 25, 2026	9	0	Tokyo, Japan	Defeated Naomichi Marufuji at Wrestle Odyssey.	
GHC Junior Heavyweight Championship	Kai Fujimura	1	August 10, 2026	85	1	Tokyo, Japan	Defeated Eita at Legacy Rise: Night 4	
GHC Hardcore Championship	Shuji Ishikawa	2	June 15, 2026	141	0	Tokyo, Japan	Defeated Daisuke Sekimoto at Wrestle Magic 2026 to win the vacant title after champion Hikaru Sato had to vacate due to injury.	
GHC 200 Championship	Shuji Kondo	1	October 25, 2026	9	0	Tokyo, Japan	Defeated Hayata at Wrestle Odyssey.	

==== Tag teams ====
Championship	Current champion(s)	Reign	Date won	Days held	Successful defenses	Location	Notes	Ref.
GHC Tag Team Championship	Jōnetsu MAX (Manabu Soya and Yuki Iino)	1 (2, 1)	June 25, 2026	131	1	Nagoya, Japan	Defeated Los Tranquilos de Japon at Legacy Rise 2026.	
GHC Junior Heavyweight Tag Team Championship	Team 2000X (Jun Masaoka and Yo-Hey)	1 (1, 8)	October 4, 2026	30	0	Yokohama, Japan	Defeated Alejandro and Dragon Bane at N-1 Victory (Finals).	

==== Women's ====
Championship	Current champion(s)	Reign	Date won	Days held	Successful defenses	Location	Notes	Ref.
GHC Women's Championship	Mirai	1	June 15, 2026	141	1	Tokyo, Japan	Defeated Great Sakuya to win the vacant championship.	

== Tournaments ==
Noah also holds annual tournaments to decide the top wrestler or tag team in the promotion:

Tournament	Latest winner(s)	Date won
N-1 Victory	Ozawa	October 4, 2026
Neo Global Tag League	Manabu Soya and Yuki Iino	June 16, 2026
Jr. Grand Prix	Hiromu Takahashi	November 21, 2025
Junior Tag League	Alejandro and Dragon Bane	March 1, 2026

== Pro Wrestling Sem ==
Pro Wrestling Sem
- Founded: 2006
- Defunct: 2015
- Headquarters: Japan

Pro Wrestling Sem was the junior affiliate of Pro Wrestling Noah launched in 2006. Its name came from the biblical figure Sem, the eldest son of Noah. Sem was originally headed by Naomichi Marufuji and Kenta, acting as coaches for the rookie competitors. Mitsuharu Misawa's inspiration for the venture came from the German Westside Xtreme Wrestling promotion, where he wrestled in March 2005. The seats are limited to a few hundred, so that all fans could sit close to the ring. Sem events usually took place in the Differ Ariake in Tokyo. No Sem events have been held since 2015.

== Broadcasters ==
Domestic:

- AbemaTV (2020–present, online linear television service, live-streaming episodes of Noah TV matches and pay-per-view events)
- Fighting TV Samurai (2000–present, currently broadcasting live specials, retrospective shows)

Worldwide:

- Wrestle Universe (2020–present, streaming service, broadcasting most Noah shows live, as well as on-demand classic, as well as content from other promotions beginning with Noah sister promotions Tokyo Joshi Pro Wrestling and DDT Pro-Wrestling)
- Triller TV (2020–present)

=== Former ===
- Nippon TV (2001–2020, broadcast weekly highlights shows and live specials on NTV G+ since 2009 until 2020)

== See also ==
- Professional wrestling in Japan
- List of professional wrestling promotions in Japan
