= El Hijo de Canis Lupus =

Mexican professional wrestler (born 1998)

Personal information
- Born: Fernando Antonio Cornejo Soto; October 9, 1998 (age 27) Pachuca, Hidalgo, Mexico
- Parent: Golpelador (father)
- Relative: Dragon Bane (brother)

Professional wrestling career
- Ring names: Alpha Wolf; El Hijo de Canis Lupus; The Ram; Ram el Carnero
- Billed height: 1.80 m (5 ft 11 in)
- Billed weight: 100 kg (220 lb)
- Trained by: Golpelador; El Exotico; Jorge el Intruso Jr.
- Debut: July 21, 2013

Fernando Antonio Cornejo Soto (born October 9, 1998) is a Mexican professional wrestler. He performs as a freelancer – predominantly for Pro Wrestling Noah, where he performs under the ring name Alpha Wolf and is a member of Team 2000X.

He is primarily known for working for International Wrestling Revolution Group, and previously worked under the ring names The Ram and Ram el Carnero. Cornejo is a second-generation wrestler, the son of Fernando Cornejo Camarena who used the name "Golpeador" (Hitter) as a wrestler. His younger brother is also a wrestler, known as Dragon Bane and the pair wrestles as Los Golpeadores. While he portrays the son of Canis Lupus, they are not related.

As El Hijo de Canis Lupus, Cornejo has won the IWRG Intercontinental Heavyweight Championship, IWRG Junior de Juniors Championship, IWRG Rey del Ring, the IWRG Intercontinental Tag Team Championship (with Rey Leon and Hell Boy), and the IWRG Intercontinental Trios Championship (with Multifacetico Jr. and Rey Mictlan). He teamed up with Trauma I for the 2018 El Protector tournament where they lost in the finals. He previously held the Mexico State Middleweight Championship while working as Ram el Carnero.

== Professional wrestling career ==
On April 8, 2022, Noah announced Wolf as one of the foreign wrestlers that would appear at Majestic on April 29. At the event, Wolf made his official debut for the promotion, losing a three-way elimination match involving his young brother Dragon Bane and Ninja Mack, who won the match. Over the following months, Wolf and Bane began working in various matches with each other. On September 3, Wolf and Bane challenged Chris Ridgeway and Daga to a title match for the GHC Junior Heavyweight Tag Team Championship. However, on September 5, Ridgeway and Daga vacated the titles, leading NOAH to announce that Los Golpeadores would face Alejandro and Ninja Mack for the vacant titles. On September 24 at Grand Ship In Nagoya 2023, Los Golpeadores defeated Alejandro and Mack to win the GHC Junior Heavyweight Tag Team Championship. They lost the title to Good Looking Guys (Tadasuke and Yo-Hey) on January 2, 2024 at The New Year.

== Personal life ==
Fernando Antonio Cornejo Soto was born on October 9, 1998, son of Fernando Cornejo Camarena, a professional wrestler known under the ring name "El Golpeador" ("Striker"). His younger brother is also a professional wrestler, working as the masked wrestler Dragon Bane. Dragón Bane's given name is not a matter of common knowledge, as he has not been unmasked via a Lucha de Apuestas ("bet match), which is a strictly adhered to tradition in lucha libre.

== Championships and accomplishments ==
- The Crash Lucha Libre
  - The Crash Tag Team Championship (1 time) – with Dragón Bane
- International Wrestling Revolution Group
  - IWRG Intercontinental Heavyweight Championship (1 time)
  - IWRG Intercontinental Tag Team Championship (2 times) – with Rey Leon (1) and Hell Boy (1)
  - IWRG Intercontinental Trios Championship (1 time, current) – with Multifacetico Jr. and Rey Mictlan
  - IWRG Junior de Juniors Championship (1 time)
  - IWRG Rey del Ring (1 time)
- Invasion Indy
  - NWA Mexico Tag Team Championship (1 time) – with Dragón Bane
- Kaoz Lucha Libre
  - Kaoz Tag Team Championship (1 time, current) – with Dragón Bane
- Mexican independent circuit
  - Mexico State Middleweight Championship (1 time)
- Pro Wrestling Illustrated
  - Ranked No. 406 of the top 500 singles wrestlers in the PWI 500 in 2021
- Pro Wrestling Noah
  - GHC National Championship (1 time)
  - GHC Junior Heavyweight Tag Team Championship (2 times) – with Dragón Bane
- Promocion 915-656
  - Promocion 915-656 Tag Team Championship (1 time) – with Dragon Bane.

== Luchas de Apuestas record ==
Winner (wager)	Loser (wager)	Location	Event	Date	Notes
Huracan Ramirez Jr. (mask)	The Ram (mask)	Pachuca, Hidalgo	Show	October 21, 2014	
Lunatik Extreme (hair)	Ram el Carnero (hair)	Naucalpan, State of Mexico	Guerra de Escuelas	February 28, 2018	(Note: Last two men in a steel cage match)
