= Dragon Bane =

Mexican professional wrestler (born 1999)

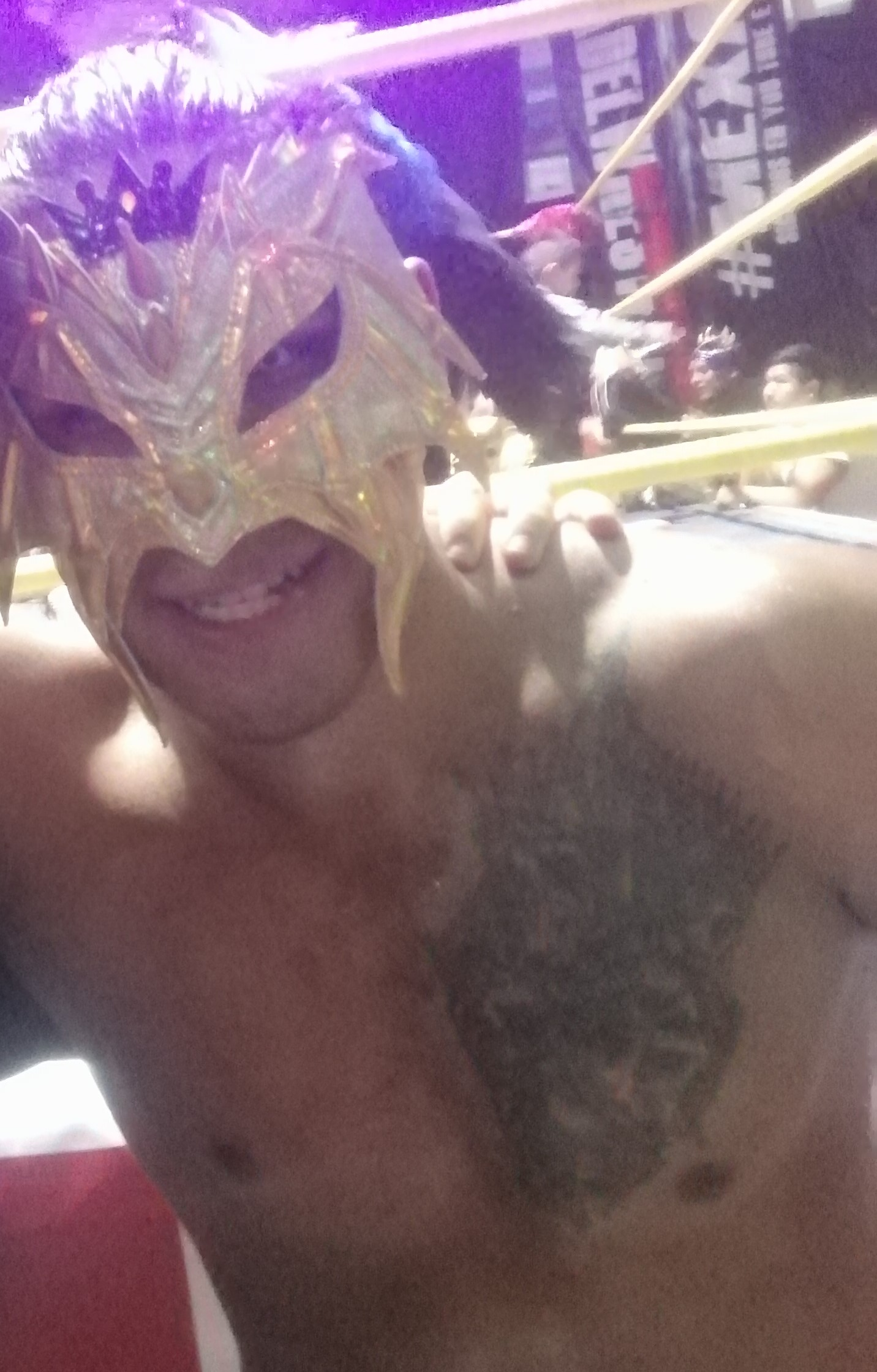
- Dragon Bane at Arena San Juan Pantitlán in March 2020.

Personal information
- Born: 3 December 1999 (age 26) Mexico City, Mexico
- Parent: "El Golpeador" (father)
- Relative: El Hijo de Canis Lupus (brother)

Professional wrestling career
- Ring name: Dragon Bane
- Trained by: Golpelador
- Debut: 5 January 2013

Dragon Bane (born December 3, 1999) is a Mexican professional wrestler. He currently performs both for working with International Wrestling Revolution Group (IWRG) and Pro Wrestling Noah. In Noah, he is the former one-times GHC National Champion and former two-time GHC Junior Heavyweight Tag Team Champion, both with Alpha Wolf. In IWRG, Dragon Bane has won the IWRG Intercontinental Middleweight Championship once and the IWRG Rey del Aire Championship twice.

== Personal life ==
Dragon Bane is the son of Fernando Cornejo Camarena, a professional wrestler known under the ring name "El Golpeador" ("Striker"). His older brother, Fernando Cornejo Soto, is also a professional wrestler, working under the ring names "El Hijo de Canis Lupus" and "Alpha Wolf". Dragon Bane's given name is not a matter of common knowledge, as he has not yet been unmasked via a Lucha de Apuestas ("bet match"), which is a strictly adhered to tradition in lucha libre, a professional wrestling style originary from Mexico.

== Professional wrestling career ==
On April 8, 2022, Noah announced Dragon Bane as one of the foreign wrestlers that would appear at Majestic on April 29. At the event, Wolf made his official debut for the promotion, losing a three-way elimination match involving his older brother Alpha Wolf and Ninja Mack, who won the match. Over the following months, Wolf and Bane began working in various matches with each other. On September 3, Wolf and Bane challenged Chris Ridgeway and Daga to a title match for the GHC Junior Heavyweight Tag Team Championship. However, on September 5, Ridgeway and Daga vacated the titles, leading NOAH to announce that Los Golpeadores would face Alejandro and Ninja Mack for the vacant titles. On 24 September 2023, at Grand Ship in Nagoya, Alpha Wolf and Dragon Bane defeated Mack and Alejandro to win the vacant GHC Junior Heavyweight Tag Team Championship. They lost the title to Good Looking Guys (Tadasuke and Yo-Hey) on January 2, 2024, at The New Year.

== Championships and accomplishments ==
- The Crash Lucha Libre
  - The Crash Tag Team Championship (1 time) – with Alpha Wolf
- International Wrestling Revolution Group
  - IWRG Intercontinental Middleweight Championship (1 time)
  - IWRG Rey del Aire Championship (2 times)
- Invasion Indy
  - NWA Mexico Tag Team Championship (1 time) – with Alpha Wolf
- Kaoz Lucha Libre
  - Kaoz Tag Team Championship (1 time, current) – with Alpha Wolf
- Pro Wrestling Noah
  - GHC National Championship (1 time)
  - GHC Junior Heavyweight Championship (1 time, current)
  - GHC Junior Heavyweight Tag Team Championship (3 times) – with Alpha Wolf (2) and Alejandro (1)
  - N Innovation (2024)
  - Jr. Tag League (2026) – with Alejandro
- Pro Wrestling Illustrated
  - Ranked No. 432 of the top 500 singles wrestlers in the PWI 500 in 2025
- Promocion 915-656
  - Promocion 915-656 Tag Team Championship (1 time) – with Alpha Wolf

== Luchas de Apuestas record ==
Winner (wager)	Loser (wager)	Location	Event	Date	Notes
Dragon Bane (mask)	Oficial AK-47 (hair)	Naucalpan, Mexico State	Máscara vs. Cabellera	3 March 2019	(Note: Match also included Dr. Cerebro and Death Metal.)
