= Hayata (wrestler) =

Japanese professional wrestler

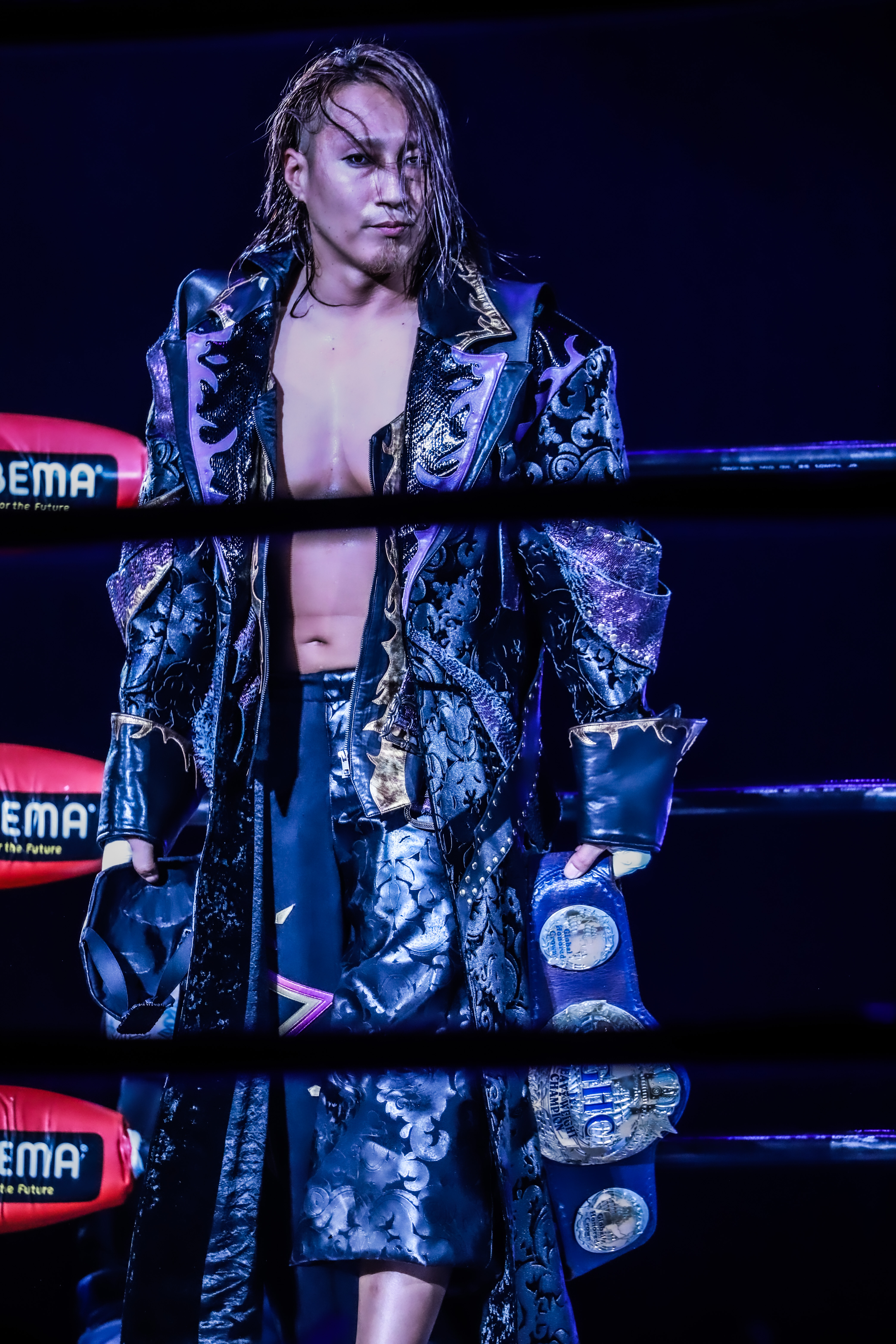
- Hayata as the GHC Junior Heavyweight Champion at Ariake Triumph on October 30, 2022

Personal information
- Born: Yohei Hayata; August 4, 1987 (age 39) Kumano, Hiroshima, Japan

Professional wrestling career
- Ring name(s): Darushimumeiku; Hayata; Yohei Hayata
- Billed height: 1.73 m (5 ft 8 in)
- Billed weight: 75 kg (165 lb)
- Trained by: Hanzo; Wrestle Gate Dojo; Yoshinari Ogawa
- Debut: July 30, 2006

Yohei Hayata (隼田 陽平, Hayata Yōhei; born August 4, 1987), better known simply as Hayata (stylized in all caps), is a Japanese professional wrestler. He is signed to Pro Wrestling Noah, where he is the former one-time and inaugural GHC 200 Champion.

Hayata began his career with Wrestle Gate then later Osaka Pro Wrestling (Osaka Pro) before going freelance and forming Doutonbori Pro Wrestling with Kuuga and several other wrestlers. Hayata was officially signed to Pro Wrestling Noah (Noah) in 2017 and his accolades include being a five-time (and Former) GHC Junior Heavyweight Champion and a five-time GHC Junior Heavyweight Tag Team Champion. He has also won the Global Junior Heavyweight League once and the Global Junior Heavyweight Tag League twice, both times with Yo-Hey.

== Professional wrestling career ==
=== Early career (2006–2010) ===
Hayata got his start in amateur wrestling and basketball, and would find himself working under Hanzo in Wrestle Gate (WG) where he would wrestle until he left Wrestle Gate in April 2010. He would also occasionally compete in Dove Pro Wrestling (Dove Pro) and All Japan Pro Wrestling (AJPW). In 2010 Hayata moved over to Osaka Pro Wrestling (Osaka Pro).

=== Osaka Pro Wrestling (2010–2013) ===
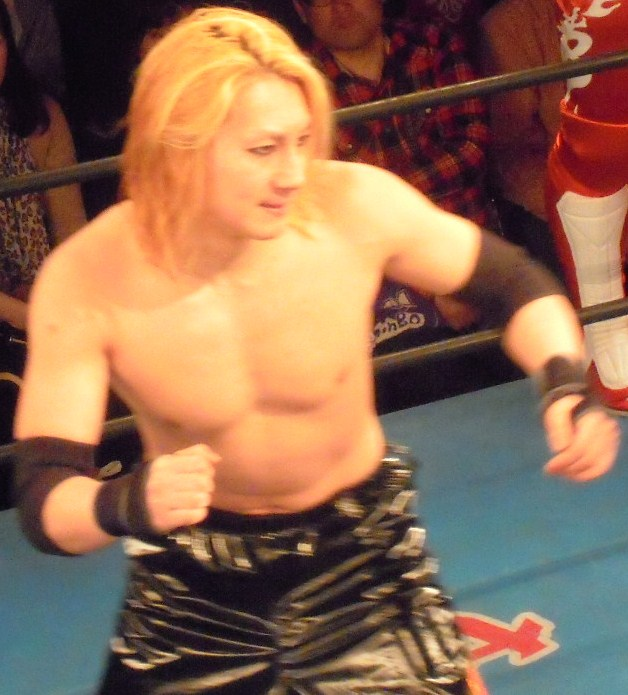
Hayata in April 2011

After he moved to Osaka Pro he received an opportunity for the Osaka Pro Wrestling Championship and in September he would join the heel unit Joker. On October 31, 2011, Hayata would win his very first championship on his first challenge after he and Kuuga defeated Atsushi Kotoge and Daisuke Harada for the Osaka Pro Wrestling Tag Team Championship. In June, Joker began having problems with Hayata, after he started losing matches. As a result, Kuuga abandoned his Osaka Pro Wrestling Tag Team Championship partner to team with Joker's newest member, Spider J, in the 2012 Osaka Tag Festival, leaving Hayata to team with Tadasuke in the same tournament. On June 24, Hayata and Tadasuke defeated Kuuga and Spider J in the finals of the tournament to win the 2012 Osaka Tag Festival. Following their win, Hayata announced that both he and Tadasuke were quitting Joker.

Hayata and Tadasuke made their first post-Joker appearance on June 30, defeating former stablemates Kuuga and Orochi via disqualification, after Kuuga hit both of them with a steel chair. Later in the event, Hayata and Tadasuke made another appearance, inviting Daisuke Harada to join them. Harada accepted the invitation on July 7 and formed a new trio with Tadasuke and Hayata with the three sharing a common goal of stopping Joker. On July 14, the new alliance was named "Glare". On July 22 at Hurricane 2012, Osaka Pro's largest annual event, Hayata and Tadasuke defeated Sengoku (Hideyoshi and Masamune) and The Big Guns ( The Bodyguard and Zeus) in a three-way match to win the vacant Osaka Pro Wrestling Tag Team Championship. Later in the event, Daisuke Harada completed Glare's clean sweep by defeating Black Buffalo to win the Osaka Pro Wrestling Championship, afterwards declaring that his stable was now going to change Osaka Pro. On September 30, Tadasuke and Hayata made their first successful defense of the Osaka Pro Wrestling Tag Team Championship against former Joker stablemates Kuuga and Orochi. On October 21, Glare won the Osaka Pro Wrestling 6 Person Tag Tournament, defeating the Joker trio of Hideyoshi, Kuuga and Quiet Storm in the finals. On November 2 Hayata and Tadasuke made their second successful defense of the Osaka Pro Wrestling Tag Team Championship, defeating Black Buffalo and Tigers Mask. On January 19, 2013, Glare defeated Black Buffalo, Kazuaki Mihara and Naoki Setoguchi in a six-man tag team main event. After the match, Harada revealed Buffalo as the newest member of Glare. On February 24 Hayata, Tadasuke, Buffalo and Harada of Glare faced Billyken Kid, Kazuaki Mihara, Naoki Setoguchi and Tigers Mask of the Osaka Pro Seikigun in an elimination match, where the losing team would be forced to disband. Hayata was the first man to be eliminated from the match. Harada pinned Billyken Kid saving Glare and forcing Seikigun to disband. On March 2, Billyken Kid and Kazuaki Mihara joined Glare, announcing they now agreed with the stable's "revolution". Glare then declared war on Joker and Unique Gundan, the two remaining stables in Osaka Pro. The rivalry between Glare and Unique Gundan built to a four-on-four elimination match on March 24, where Hayata, Tadasuke, Harada and Mihara suffered an upset defeat at the hands of Ebessan, Kanjyuro Matsuyama, Kuishinbo Kamen and Takoyakida, after which the two groups made peace with each other.

On March 30, six top Osaka Pro wrestlers, including Hayata and his Glare stablemate Daisuke Harada, announced that they were quitting the promotion following April 29. As a result, Hayata and Tadasuke relinquished the Osaka Pro Tag Team Championship. Hayata would join Kuuga in the formation of Doutonbori Pro Wrestling.

=== Freelance (2013–2017) ===
After his departure from Osaka Pro he participated in the first Dotonbori Tag King Decision League with Yo-Hey and finishing the tournament with 8 points. After that he would make appearances until signed with Dove Pro Wrestling (Dove Pro). In 2016 would make appearances in Pro Wrestling Freedoms he won the King of Freedom Tag Team Championship with Yuya Susumu. On February 19, 2017, they lost the titles to Brahman Kei and Brahman Shu. On September 3, he signed an exclusive contract with Pro Wrestling Noah (Noah) ending his career in Dove Pro.

=== Pro Wrestling Noah (2016–present) ===
In December 2016 after the Suzuki-gun storyline with Pro Wrestling Noah (Noah) the president of Noah Masayuki Uchida announced that he would let freelancers wrestle in Noah. On December 9 he made his debut in Noah defeating Hitoshi Kumano. On February 18, 2017, he and Yo-Hey were defeated by Hi69 and Taiji Ishimori in a match for the vacant GHC Junior Heavyweight Tag Team Championship. Three days later, Hayata and Yo-Hey came together with Daisuke Harada and Tadasuke to form a new stable named Ratel's. On March 25 Hayata pinned GHC Junior Heavyweight Champion Hajime Ohara during an eight-man tag team match. After the match in a backstage interview Hayata challenged Ohara into a title match. On May 27, he defeated Ohara to win the GHC Junior Heavyweight Championship. On June 25, he lost the title to Taiji Ishimori in his first defense. On July 27, he and Yo-Hey defeated XX (Taiji Ishimori and Hi69) to win the 2017 Global Junior Heavyweight Tag League. On August 26, Hayata and Yo-Hey defeated XX in a rematch to become the new GHC Junior Heavyweight Tag Team Champions. On September 3, Noah announced that Hayata had signed an exclusive contract with the promotion, ending his days as a freelancer.

On April 11, 2024, Hayata defeated Jack Morris to win the GHC National Championship, in the process, becoming the first junior heavyweight wrestler to hold the title. On July 13 at Destination, Hayata lost the GHC National Championship to Ulka Sasaki. Shortly after, Hayata and Yo-Hey defeated Eita and Shuji Kondo to win the GHC Junior Heavyweight Tag Team Championship for the third time.

On November 28, Hayata left Passionate Ratel's to form an alliance with Tetsuya Endo, Ulka Sasaki and Kenta.

== Championships and accomplishments ==
- Dove Pro-Wrestling

- Dove World Heavyweight Championship (1 time)
- One Night Tag Tournament (2017) - Tadasuke

- Osaka Pro Wrestling

- Osaka Pro Wrestling Tag Team Championship (2 times) – with Kuuga (1) and Tadasuke (1)
- Osaka Tag Festival (2012) – with Tadasuke
- Osaka Pro Wrestling 6 Person Tag Tournament (2012) – with Tadasuke and Daisuke Harada

- Pro Wrestling Freedoms

- King of Freedom World Tag Team Championship (1 time) – with Yuya Susumu

- Pro Wrestling Illustrated
  - Ranked No. 87 of the top 500 singles wrestlers in the PWI 500 in 2023
- Pro Wrestling Noah

- GHC Hardcore Championship (1 time)
- GHC National Championship (1 time)
- GHC Junior Heavyweight Championship (5 times)
- GHC Junior Heavyweight Tag Team Championship (6 times) – with Yo-Hey (3) and Yoshinari Ogawa (3)
- GHC 200 Championship (1 time, inaugural)
- Global Junior Heavyweight League (2019)
- Global Junior Heavyweight Tag League (2017, 2018) – with Yo-Hey
