= Stinger (professional wrestling) =

Professional wrestling stable

- Current logo of the stable (2018–2024)

Stable
- Members: See below
- Billed from: Japan
- Debut: December 16, 2018
- Disbanded: August 13, 2024
- Years active: 2018–2024

Stinger (スティンガー, Sutingā) (often stylized in all uppercase as STINGER) was a villainous professional wrestling stable, based in the Pro Wrestling Noah (Noah) promotion. The stable was originally founded and co-led by Yoshinari Ogawa and Kotaro Suzuki between 2018 and 2020 during the unit's first period of activity. The second period of activity took place between 2020 and 2024 and was briefly led by Ogawa.

== History ==
=== Formation. Under Kotaro Suzuki and Yoshinari Ogawa's leadership. (2018-2020) ===
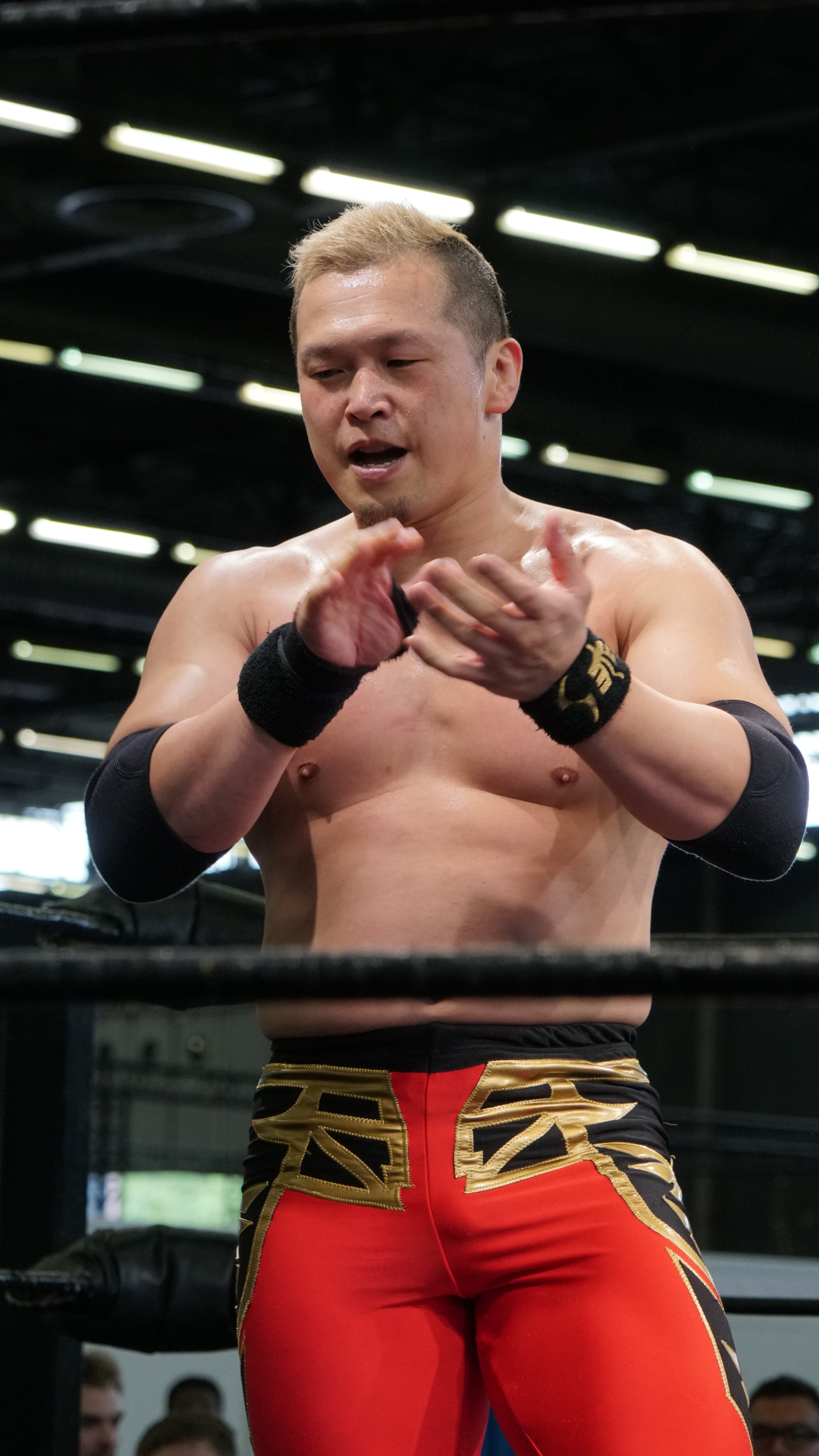
Former co-leader of the stable, Kotaro Suzuki.

In October 2018, Kotaro Suzuki began a rivalry with the Ratel's stable during which he was joined by Yoshinari Ogawa. On October 30, Suzuki defeated Ratel's leader Daisuke Harada to win the GHC Junior Heavyweight Championship for the third time. Harada demanded a rematch which Suzuki accepted on condition that if Harada lost, Ratel's would be forced to disband. On December 16 at Great Voyage In Yokohama Vol. 2, Suzuki lost the title against Harada and after the match Yo-Hey turned against Ratel's to join Suzuki and Ogawa and the three were dubbed Stinger.

On January 4, 2020, Ogawa defeated Hayata to win the GHC Junior Heavyweight Championship.

=== Second run of the stable. Leaderless period. (2020–2023) ===
On March 29, Ogawa disbanded Stinger. On April 19 at The Spirit, Suzuki defeated Ogawa to win the GHC Junior Heavyweight Championship for the fourth time. Suzuki then asked Ogawa to team up with him to fight for the GHC Junior Heavyweight Tag Team Championship, which Ogawa accepted. On May 9, during the GHC Junior Heavyweight Tag Team Championship tournament against Ratel's (Hayata and Yo-Hey), Hayata turned on Yo-Hey, joining Suzuki and Ogawa to reform Stinger. The following day, Hayata and Ogawa defeated Ratel's (Tadasuke and Yo-Hey) to win the vacant GHC Junior Heavyweight Tag Team Championship, meaning Stinger held both Noah's Junior Heavyweight Championships. On August 8 at NOAH The Chronicle Vol. 3, Hayata defeated former Ratel's teammate Daisuke Harada to win the IPW:UK Junior Heavyweight Championship and in a behind-the-scenes interview he threw the title in a trash can, causing the title to be deactivated. On October 11, Hayata and Ogawa lost the GHC Junior Heavyweight Tag Team Championship to Momo no Seishun Tag (Atsushi Kotoge and Daisuke Harada).

==== Rebirth of the stable. Arrival of Seiki Yoshioka. (May 2021) ====
On May 2, 2021, during a match between Stinger and Full Throttle, Seiki Yoshioka turned against Hajime Ohara, leaving Full Throttle to become the fourth member of Stinger. On May 31, Hayata and Ogawa lost the GHC Junior Heavyweight Tag Team Championship to Harada and Hajime Ohara.

On August 1, at Cross Over 2021 In Hiroshima, Yoshioka and Susumu defeated Daisuke Harada and Hajime Ohara to win the GHC Junior Heavyweight Tag Team Championship. On September 12 at N-1 Victory, they lost the titles against Kotoge and Ohara. At Noah The Best 2021 on November 28, Hayata and Yoshinari Ogawa defeated Eita and Nosawa Rongai to win the GHC Junior Heavyweight Tag Team Championship.

At Noah The New Year 2022 on January 1, Seiki Yoshioka and Yuya Susumu fell short to Kongo, Aleja and Hao. At Noah Bumper Crop 2022 In Sendai on January 16, Hayata and Yuya Susumu fell short to Atsushi Kotoge and Hajime Ohara. At Noah Gain Control 2022 In Nagoya on February 23, Hayata and Yuya Susumu dropped the GHC Junior Heavyweight Tag Team Championship to Atsushi Kotoge and Yo-Hey. At Noah Great Voyage in Fukuoka 2022 on March 21, Hayata and Yoshinari Ogawa defeated Eita and Super Crazy.

On the first night of the Noah Majestic 2022 event from April 29, Chris Ridgeway and Yoshinari Ogawa went into a time limit draw against stablemates Seiki Yoshioka and Yuya Susumu in a match disputed for the GHC Junior Heavyweight Tag Team Championship, and Seiki Yoshioka fell short to Xtreme Tiger. On the second night from April 30, Chris Ridgeway, Hayata, Seiki Yoshioka, Yoshinari Ogawa and Yuya Susumu defeated Los Perros del Mal de Japón (Eita, El Texano Jr., Kotaro Suzuki, Nosawa Rongai and Super Crazy). At Noah Dream On Final on May 21, 2022, Chris Ridgeway and Yoshinari Ogawa went on a time-limit draw against Seiki Yoshioka and Yuya Susumu in an intern stable clash for the GHC Junior Heavyweight Tag Team Championship, and Hayata successfully defended the GHC Junior Heavyweight Championship against Xtreme Tiger.

At CyberFight Festival 2022 on June 12, Yoshinari Ogawa and Hayata teamed up with Rob Van Dam to defeat Kaito Kiyomiya, Daisuke Harada and Yo-Hey in six-man tag team action. At Destination on July 16, 2022, Yoshinari Ogawa and Yuya Susumu unsuccessfully faced Eita and Kotaro Suzuki, and Hayata successfully defended the GHC Junior Heavyweight Championship against Seiki Yoshioka. At Departure on August 5, 2022, Yoshinari Ogawa and Yuya Susumu teamed up with Kai Fujimura to defeat Los Perros del Mal de Japón (Eita, Nosawa Rongai and Super Crazy), and Hayata successfully defended the GHC Junior Heavyweight Championship against Shuji Kondo. At Grand Ship In Nagoya on September 25, 2022, Atsushi Kotoge and Seiki Yoshioka defeated Chris Ridgeway and Yoshinari Ogawa in an intern stable clash to win the GHC Junior Heavyweight Tag Team Championship, and Hayata successfully defended the GHC Junior Heavyweight Championship against Yo-Hey. At Ariake Triumph on October 30, 2022, Chris Ridgeway and Yoshinari Ogawa teamed up with Yasutaka Yano to defeat Los Perros del Mal de Japón (Eita, Nosawa Rongai and Super Crazy) in a six-man tag team match, Atsushi Kotoge and Seiki Yoshioka defeated Kongo (Hi69 and Tadasuke) to retain the GHC Junior Heavyweight Tag Team Championship, and Hayata dropped the GHC Junior Heavyweight Championship to Ninja Mack. At Global Honored Crown on November 10, 2022, Atsushi Kotoge and Seiki Yoshioka dropped the GHC Junior Heavyweight Tag Team Championship to Kongo (Hajime Ohara and Shuji Kondo). At N Innovation 2022 on December 23, Kotoge and Yoshioka dropped the Junior Tag titles again to Kzy and Yo-Hey.

At Noah The New Year 2023 on January 1, Yoshinari Ogawa teamed up with Eita to win the GHC Junior Heavyweight Tag Team Championship. At The Great Muta Final "Bye-Bye" on January 22, 2023, Seiki Yoshioka teamed up with Atsushi Kotoge in a losing effort against Kongo (Hajime Ohara and Hi69), and Yoshinari Ogawa teamed up with Eita and Nosawa Rongai in a losing effort against Junta Miyawaki, Alejandro and Yasutaka Yano.

=== Under Ogawa's sole leadership (April 2023–August 2024) ===
At Noah Majestic 2023 on May 4, Daga joined the unit after betraying Eita and aligning himself with Ogawa and Ridgeway. At Noah Great Journey in Nagoya 2023 on June 17, Chris Ridgeway and Daga teamed up with Sean Legacy in a losing effort against Good Looking Guys (Jack Morris, Tadasuke and Yo-Hey). After Chris Ridgeway's departure from September 5, 2023, the stable shrunk down to the tag team of Yoshinari Ogawa and Daga who were usually competing separately. At Noah Grand Ship In Nagoya 2023 on September 24, Daga defeated Junta Miyawaki in singles competition, while Ogawa teamed up with Naomichi marufuji and Leona in a losing effort against Kaito Kiyomiya, Ryohei Oiwa and Eita. At Noah Demolition Stage In Fukuoka 2023 on October 28, Daga and Ogawa wrestled Hayata and Eita into a double pinfall.

At Noah The New Year 2024 on January 1, Ogawa teamed up with Zack Sabre Jr. to defeat Hiroshi Tanahashi and Hayata in tag team competition, and Daga successfully defended the GHC Junior Heavyweight Championship against Eita. On the first night of the Noah Star Navigation 2024 event from January 13, Ogawa and Daga teamed up with El Hijo del Dr. Wagner Jr. to defeat Kaito Kiyomiya, Hajime Ohara and Super Crazy. At Noah Cross Over in Sendai 2024 on February 4, Daga successfully defended the GHC Junior title against Hajime Ohara. At Noah Wrestle Magic on May 4, Daga once again retained the GHC Junior title against Alejandro. At Noah Grand Ship In Yokohama on June 16, he retained against Starboy Charlie. At Noah Destination 2024 on July 13, Daga dropped the title to Amakusa.

On August 13, 2024, Yoshinari Ogawa retired from professional wrestling due to neck injuries. The stable was dissoluted with his retirement.

== Members ==
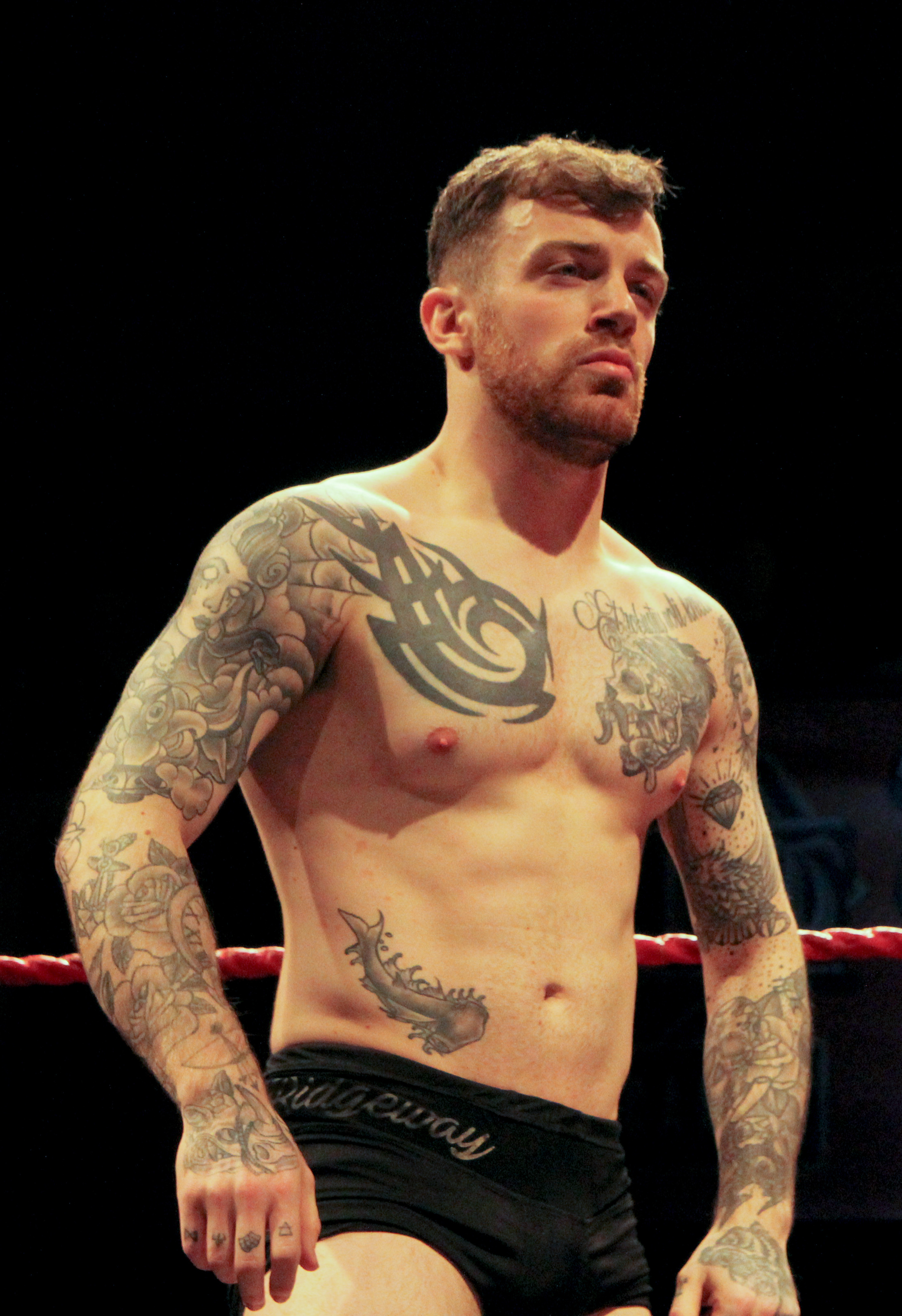
Chris Ridgeway

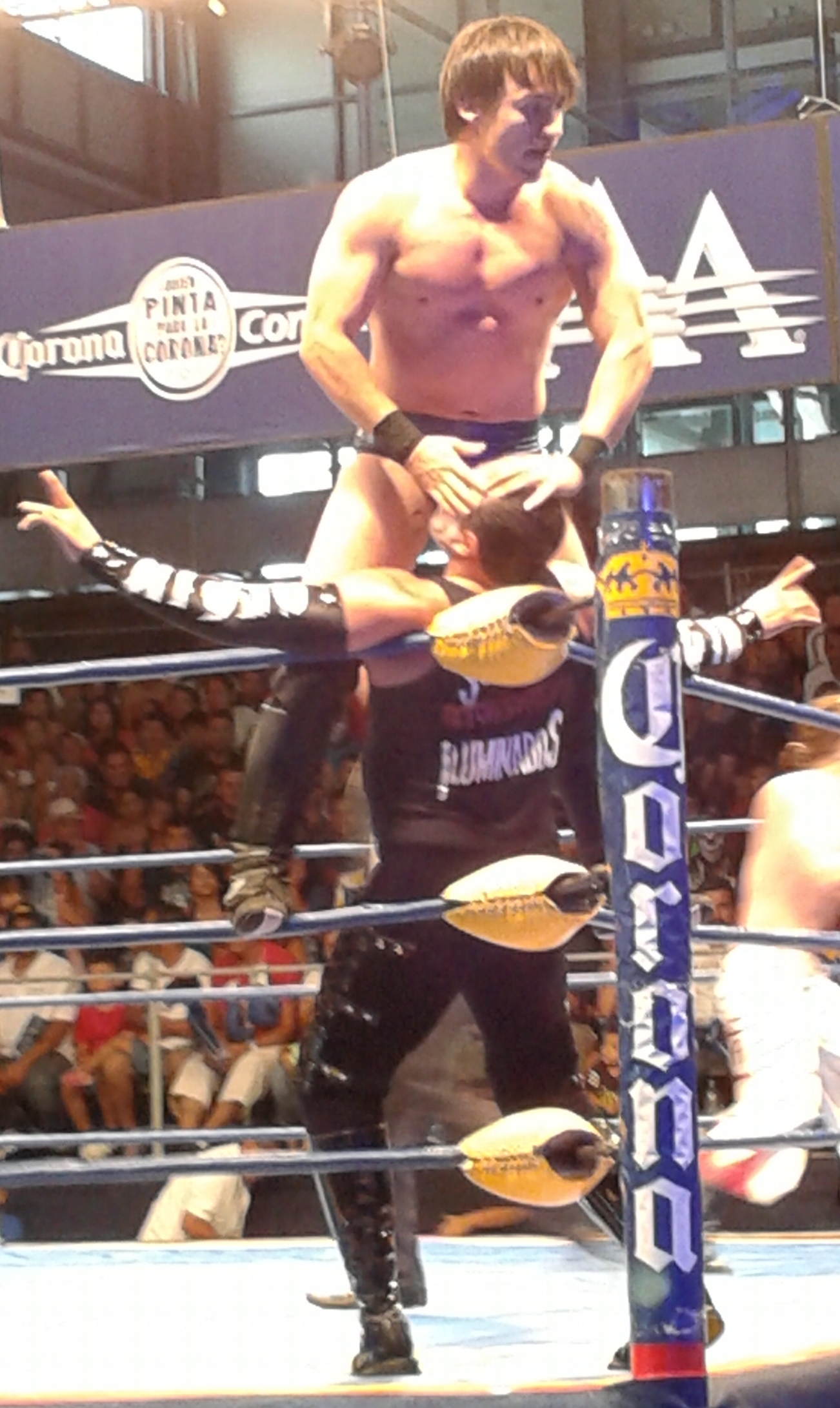
Daga

*	Founding member
I-II	Leader

=== Members ===
Member		Tenure(s)
Atsushi Kotoge		September 3, 2019–March 29, 2020
Kotaro Suzuki	* I	December 16, 2018–March 29, 2020; May 9, 2020–October 28, 2020
Yo-Hey	*	December 16, 2018–May 9, 2019
Yuya Susumu		December 6, 2020–September 3, 2022
Seiki Yoshioka		May 2, 2021–June 8, 2022
Hayata	*	February 19, 2019–May 4, 2023
Chris Ridgeway		June 9, 2019–March 29, 2020; April 29, 2022–September 5, 2023
Yoshinari Ogawa	* II	December 16, 2018–March 29, 2020; May 9, 2020–August 13, 2024
Daga		May 4, 2023–August 13, 2024

== Sub-groups ==
=== Former ===
Affiliate	Members	Tenure	Type
Scramble Time	Seiki Yoshioka; Yuya Susumu	2021–2022	Tag team
The Hiroshima Boys	Hayata; Seiki Yoshioka; Yuya Susumu	2021–2022	Trio/tag team

== Championships and accomplishments ==
- International Pro Wrestling: United Kingdom
  - IPW:UK Junior Heavyweight Championship (2 times) – Kotoge (1) and Hayata (1)
- Pro Wrestling Noah
  - GHC National Championship (1 time, current) – Hayata
  - GHC Junior Heavyweight Championship (7 times) – Suzuki (2), Ogawa (1), Hayata (4) and Daga (1)
  - GHC Junior Heavyweight Tag Team Championship (10 times) – Ogawa and Suzuki (1), Kotoge and Suzuki (1), Hayata and Ogawa (3), Yoshioka and Susumu (2), Ridgeway and Ogawa (1), Ogawa and Eita (Note: Eita was not part of the stable while holding the titles with Ogawa.) (1), Ridgeway and Daga (1)
  - Global Junior Heavyweight Tag League (2019) – Ogawa and Suzuki
  - NOAH Jr. Rumble (2021) – Hayata
- Pro Wrestling Illustrated
  - Ranked Hayata No. 87 of the top 500 singles wrestlers in the PWI 500 in 2023
  - Ranked Ridgeway No. 292 of the top 500 singles wrestlers in the PWI 500 in 2023
  - Ranked Kotoge No. 294 of the top 500 singles wrestlers in the PWI 500 in 2019
  - Ranked Suzuki No. 322 of the top 500 singles wrestlers in the PWI 500 in 2019
  - Ranked Ogawa No. 412 of the top 500 singles wrestlers in the PWI 500 in 2022

== See also ==
- Kongo (professional wrestling)
- Good Looking Guys
- Sugiura-gun
- Choukibou-gun
