= N Innovation 2022 =

2022 Pro Wrestling Noah event

- Promotional poster featuring various wrestlers
- Promotion: CyberFight
- Brand(s): Pro Wrestling Noah
- Date: December 23, 2022
- City: Tokyo, Japan
- Venue: Shinjuku Face
- Attendance: 320

Pay-per-view chronology
← Previous; The Best 2022	Next → The New Year 2023

N Innovation 2022 was a professional wrestling event promoted by CyberFight's sub-brand Pro Wrestling Noah. It took place on December 23, 2022, in Tokyo, Japan, at the Shinjuku Face. The event aired on CyberAgent's AbemaTV online linear television service and CyberFight's streaming service Wrestle Universe. It was the last pay-per-view promoted by Noah in 2022.

Six matches were contested at the event, and two of Noah's five championships were on the line. The main event saw Amakusa defeat Dante Leon for the GHC Junior Heavyweight Championship. In another prominent match, Kzy and Yo-Hey defeated Stinger stablemates Atsushi Kotoge and Seiki Yoshioka to win the GHC Junior Heavyweight Tag Team Championship.

== Background ==
=== Storylines ===
The event featured six professional wrestling matches that resulted from scripted storylines, where wrestlers portrayed villains, heroes, or less distinguishable characters in the scripted events that built tension and culminated in a wrestling match or series of matches.

=== Event ===
Prior to the event, Kai Fujimura sustained an injury, therefore the show's card suffered minor changes.

The event has been opened by the singles confrontation between one of the promotion's veteran Hi69 and rookie Shoki Kitamura which ended with the latter's victory. Next, Alejandro, Andy Wu and Ninja Mack picked up a victory over Kongo's Hajime Ohara, Shuji Kondo and Tadasuke. The third match saw Yasutaka Yano picking up a victory over Nosawa Rongai. The fourth match portraited the singles bout between Yoshinari Ogawa and Eita which ended in a no-contest. There have been two title fights in the main card. The first one which served as the semi-main event saw Yo-Hey teaming up with Dragon Gate's Kzy and defeating Stinger's sub-group tag team of Atsushi Kotoge and Seiki Yoshioka to win the GHC Junior Heavyweight Tag Team Championship, ending the champion team's reign at thirty days and no defenses.

The main event portraited the confrontation between Dante Leon and Amakusa for the GHC Junior Heavyweight Championship which solded with the latter's victory and with Leon failing to score his first defense, his reign concluding after 43 days. After the match, Amakusa received a challenge from Junta Miyawaki which was set for The New Year 2023 on January 1.

== Results ==
No.	Results	Stipulations	Times
1	Shoki Kitamura defeated Hi69 by pinfall	Singles match	9:22
2	Alejandro, Andy Wu and Ninja Mack defeated Kongo (Hajime Ohara, Shuji Kondo and Tadasuke) by pinfall	Six-man tag team match	11:53
3	Yasutaka Yano defeated Nosawa Rongai by pinfall	Singles match	13:41
4	Eita vs. Yoshinari Ogawa ended in a no-contest	Singles match	18:28
5	Kzy and Yo-Hey defeated Stinger (Atsushi Kotoge and Seiki Yoshioka) (c) by pinfall	Tag team match for the GHC Junior Heavyweight Tag Team Championship	27:53
6	Amakusa defeated Dante Leon (c) by pinfall	Singles match for the GHC Junior Heavyweight Championship	23:37
(c) / – the champion(s) heading into the match
