= The Great Muta Final "Bye-Bye" =

2023 Pro Wrestling Noah event

- Promotional poster featuring The Great Muta, Sting and Darby Allin
- Promotion: CyberFight
- Brand(s): Pro Wrestling Noah
- Date: January 22, 2023
- City: Yokohama, Japan
- Venue: Yokohama Arena
- Attendance: 8,433

Pay-per-view chronology
← Previous; Noah The New Year 2023	Next → Noah Star Navigation 2023

The Great Muta Final "Bye-Bye" was a professional wrestling event promoted by CyberFight's sub-brand Pro Wrestling Noah. It took place on January 22, 2023, in Yokohama, Japan, at the Yokohama Arena. The event aired on CyberAgent's AbemaTV online linear television service and CyberFight's streaming service Wrestle Universe.

Nine matches were contested at the event. The event was focused on the final match of Keiji Muto's "The Great Muta" character.

== Storylines ==
The event featured nine professional wrestling matches that involved different wrestlers from pre-existing scripted feuds and storylines. Wrestlers portray villains, heroes, or less distinguishable characters in scripted events that build tension and culminate in a wrestling match or series of matches.

== Event ==
=== Preliminary matches ===
The show started with Kongo (Hajime Ohara and Hi69) defeating Atsushi Kotoge and Seiki Yoshioka. The second match saw Jungle Kyona and Ice Ribbon's Saori Anou picking up a victory Nomads (Sumire Natsu and Maya Yukihi). Next, Timothy Thatcher defeated Masaaki Mochizuki in singles action. The fourth bout saw Junta Miyawaki, Alejandro and Yasutaka Yano win their match against the team of Yoshinari Ogawa, Eita and Nosawa Rongai via disqualification due to Ogawa, Eita and Nosawa tearing off Alejandro's mask. In the fifth match, Good Looking Guys (Jake Lee, Jack Morris and Anthony Greene) defeated Masa Kitamiya, Daiki Inaba and Yoshiki Inamura. Next, Kazushi Sakuraba defeated Hideki Suzuki by referee stoppage in a Sugiura-gun intern stable clash GHC martial arts rules match. The seventh bout saw Amakusa, Último Dragón and Ninja Mack (with Sonny Onoo) defeating Yo-Hey, Kzy and Dante Leon. In the eighth bout, Kaito Kiyomiya, El Hijo de Dr. Wagner Jr., Takashi Sugiura and Satoshi Kojima defeated Kongo (Kenoh, Katsuhiko Nakajima, Masakatsu Funaki and Manabu Soya) in eight-man tag team action.

=== Main event ===
In the main event, The Great Muta teamed up with Sting and Darby Allin from All Elite Wrestling (AEW), all three of them being accompanied to the ring by The Great Kabuki. The team succeeded in pulling a victory against Hakushi, Akira and Naomichi Marufuji. This was Muta's final Noah appearance. In addition, it was also the final match in his "Great Muta" character and Sting's final match in Japan before retiring in 2024.

== Results ==
No.	Results	Stipulations	Times
1	Kongo (Hajime Ohara and Hi69) defeated Atsushi Kotoge and Seiki Yoshioka by pinfall	Tag team match	6:41
2	Jungle Kyona and Saori Anou defeated Nomads (Sumire Natsu and Maya Yukihi) by pinfall	Tag team match	13:46
3	Timothy Thatcher defeated Masaaki Mochizuki by pinfall	Singles match	8:44
4	Junta Miyawaki, Alejandro and Yasutaka Yano defeated Los Perros del Mal de Japón (Eita and Nosawa Rongai) and Yoshinari Ogawa by disqualification	Six-man tag team match	7:22
5	Good Looking Guys (Jake Lee, Jack Morris and Anthony Greene) defeated Masa Kitamiya, Daiki Inaba and Yoshiki Inamura by pinfall	Six-man tag team match	10:49
6	Kazushi Sakuraba defeated Hideki Suzuki by referee stoppage	GHC martial arts rules match	10:37
7	Amakusa, Último Dragón and Ninja Mack (with Sonny Onoo) defeated Yo-Hey, Kzy and Dante Leon by pinfall	Six-man tag team match	11:41
8	Sugiura-gun (El Hijo de Dr. Wagner Jr. and Takashi Sugiura), Kaito Kiyomiya and Satoshi Kojima defeated Kongo (Kenoh, Katsuhiko Nakajima, Masakatsu Funaki and Manabu Soya) by pinfall	Eight-man tag team match	18:36
9	The Great Muta, Sting and Darby Allin (with The Great Kabuki) defeated Hakushi, Akira and Naomichi Marufuji by pinfall	Six-man tag team match	22:23
