= Noah Majestic 2022 =

2022 Pro Wrestling Noah event

NOAH Majestic 2022
- Promotional poster of the April 29 show featuring Tadasuke, Yo-Hey, Hayata, Atsushi Kotoge and Daisuke Harada
- Promotion: CyberFight
- Brand: Pro Wrestling Noah
- Date: April 29, 2022
- City: Tokyo, Japan
- Venue: Ryogoku Kokugikan
- Attendance: 1,585 (Night 1); 2,077 (Night 2); Combined: 3,662

Pay-per-view chronology
← Previous; Great Voyage in Fukuoka 2022	Next → Dream On Final 2022

Noah Majestic chronology
← Previous; 2021	Next → 2023

NOAH Majestic 2022 was a two-night professional wrestling event promoted by CyberFight's sub-brand Pro Wrestling Noah. It took place on April 29 and 30, 2022, in Tokyo, Japan, at the Ryogoku Kokugikan. The event aired on CyberAgent's AbemaTV online linear television service and CyberFight's streaming service Wrestle Universe.

== Storylines ==
Both of the nights featured a total of twenty-one professional wrestling matches that resulted from scripted storylines, where wrestlers portrayed villains, heroes, or less distinguishable characters in the scripted events that built tension and culminated in a wrestling match or series of matches.

== Noah Majestic - N Innovation ==
=== Event ===
The first night event started with the confrontation between Ikuto Hidaka and Kai Fujimura solded with the victory of the preceding one. Next, Melbourne City Wrestling's Slex picked up a victory over Yasutaka Yano. In the third bout, Kotaro Suzuki and Yuya Susumu fought in a ten-minute time-limit draw. The fourth match portraited the competition between El Texano Jr., Nosawa Rongai and Super Crazy and Hajime Ohara, Tadasuke and Shuji Kondo which ended with the victory of the first team. Next, Hao defeated Nio in singles action. Next, Xtreme Tiger picked up a victory over Seiki Yoshioka. In the seventh match, Dragon Gate's Z-Brats (H.Y.O, SB Kento and Shun Skywalker) defeated Alejandro, Daisuke Harada and Junta Miyawaki. In the eighth match, Ninja Mack defeated Alpha Wolf and Dragon Bane, two of International Wrestling Revolution Group's roster talent sent to an excursion in Japan. In the semi main event, Chris Ridgeway and Yoshinari Ogawa defeated Atsushi Kotoge and Yo-Hey to capture the GHC Junior Heavyweight Tag Team Championship.

In the main event, Hayata defeated Eita to win the GHC Junior Heavyweight Championship for the fourth time in his career.

=== Results ===
No.	Results	Stipulations	Times
1	Ikuto Hidaka defeated Kai Fujimura by pinfall	Singles match	6:37
2	Slex defeated Yasutaka Yano by pinfall	Singles match	8:37
3	Kotaro Suzuki vs. Yuya Susumu ended in a time-limit draw	Singles match	10:00
4	Los Perros del Mal de Japón (El Texano Jr., Nosawa Rongai and Super Crazy) defeated Kongo (Hajime Ohara, Tadasuke and Shuji Kondo) by pinfall	Six-man tag team match	10:46
5	Hao defeated Nio by pinfall	Singles match	16:03
6	Xtreme Tiger defeated Seiki Yoshioka by pinfall	Singles match	11:31
7	Z-Brats (H.Y.O, SB Kento and Shun Skywalker) defeated Alejandro, Daisuke Harada and Junta Miyawaki by pinfall	Six-man tag team match	25:00
8	Ninja Mack defeated Alpha Wolf and Dragón Bane by pinfall	Three-way elimination match	18:03
9	Stinger (Chris Ridgeway and Yoshinari Ogawa) defeated Atsushi Kotoge and Yo-Hey (c) by pinfall	Tag team match for the GHC Junior Heavyweight Tag Team Championship	33:41
10	Hayata defeated Eita (c) by pinfall	Singles match for the GHC Junior Heavyweight Championship	28:08
(c) / – the champion(s) heading into the match

== Noah Majestic ==
Noah Majestic Final 2022
- Promotional poster of the April 30 show featuring Kazuyuki Fujita and Go Shiozaki
- Promotion: CyberFight
- Brand: Pro Wrestling Noah
- Date: April 30, 2022
- City: Tokyo, Japan
- Venue: Ryogoku Kokugikan
- Attendance: 2,077

=== Event ===
The second show started with the confrontation between Kai Fujimura and Slex and Alejandro and Yasutaka Yano solded with the victory of the preceding team. Next, Kongo (Hajime Ohara, Manabu Soya and Tadasuke) defeated Funky Express (Akitoshi Saito, King Tany and Mohammed Yone) in six-man tag team action. The third bout saw Stinger (Chris Ridgeway, Hayata, Seiki Yoshioka, Yoshinari Ogawa and Yuya Susumu) defeating Los Perros del Mal de Japón (Eita, El Texano Jr., Kotaro Suzuki, Nosawa Rongai and Super Crazy) by disqualification. In the fourth match, Kazushi Sakuraba and Kendo Kashin picked up a victory over Daiki Inaba and Masato Tanaka. Next, Michael Elgin defeated Masa Kitamiya in singles action. The sixth match saw Masakatsu Funaki securing the third consecutive defense of the GHC National Championship against Simon Gotch. The eighth match portraited Alpha Wolf and Dragon Bane teaming up with Xtreme Tiger and Ninja Mack to defeat Atsushi Kotoge, Daisuke Harada, Junta Miyawaki and Yo-Hey. Next, Naomichi Marufuji and Satoshi Kojima defeated Kinya Okada and Yoshiki Inamura. The semi main event saw Hideki Suzuki and Takashi Sugiura securing their first defense of the GHC Tag Team Championship against Katsuhiko Nakajima and Kenoh.

In the main event, Go Shiozaki succeeded in outmatching Kaito Kiyomiya and winning the GHC Heavyweight Championship for the fifth time in his career, title which was previously vacated by Kazuyuki Fujita who was tested positive for COVID-19.

=== Results ===
No.	Results	Stipulations	Times
1	Kai Fujimura and Slex defeated Alejandro and Yasutaka Yano by pinfall	Tag team match	10:22
2	Kongo (Hajime Ohara, Manabu Soya and Tadasuke) defeated Funky Express (Akitoshi Saito, King Tany and Mohammed Yone) by pinfall	Six-man tag team match	12:55
3	Stinger (Chris Ridgeway, Hayata, Seiki Yoshioka, Yoshinari Ogawa and Yuya Susumu) defeated Los Perros del Mal de Japón (Eita, El Texano Jr., Kotaro Suzuki, Nosawa Rongai and Super Crazy) by disqualification	Ten-man tag team match	9:28
4	Sugiura-gun (Kazushi Sakuraba and Kendo Kashin) defeated Don Fujii and Masaaki Mochizuki by pinfall	Tag team match	6:47
5	Sugiura-gun International (El Hijo del Dr. Wagner Jr. and René Duprée) defeated Daiki Inaba and Masato Tanaka by pinfall	Tag team match	10:51
6	Michael Elgin defeated Masa Kitamiya by pinfall	Singles match	12:33
7	Masakatsu Funaki (c) defeated Simon Gotch by pinfall	Singles match for the GHC National Championship	9:47
8	Los Golpeadores (Alpha Wolf and Dragón Bane), Xtreme Tiger and Ninja Mack defeated Atsushi Kotoge, Daisuke Harada, Junta Miyawaki and Yo-Hey by pinfall	Eight-man tag team match	16:33
9	Naomichi Marufuji and Satoshi Kojima defeated Kinya Okada and Yoshiki Inamura by pinfall	Tag team match	15:01
10	Sugiura-gun (Hideki Suzuki and Takashi Sugiura) (c) defeated Kongo (Katsuhiko Nakajima and Kenoh) by pinfall	Tag team match for the GHC Tag Team Championship	23:36
11	Go Shiozaki defeated Kaito Kiyomiya by pinfall	Singles match for the vacant GHC Heavyweight Championship	30:02
(c) / – the champion(s) heading into the match
