= Noah Gain Control 2022 In Nagoya =

2022 Pro Wrestling Noah event

- Promotional poster featuring various wrestlers
- Promotion: CyberFight
- Brand(s): Pro Wrestling Noah
- Date: February 23, 2022
- City: Nagoya, Japan
- Venue: Nagoya Congress Center
- Attendance: 643

Pay-per-view chronology
| ← Previous; Higher Ground 2022 | Next → Great Voyage in Fukuoka 2022 |

Noah Gain Control 2022 In Nagoya was a professional wrestling event promoted by CyberFight's sub-brand Pro Wrestling Noah. It took place on February 23, 2022, in Nagoya, Japan, at the Nagoya Congress Center. The event aired on CyberAgent's AbemaTV online linear television service and CyberFight's streaming service Wrestle Universe.

The event featured ten matches with three of Noah's five championships on the line. The main event saw Kazuyuki Fujita defeat Katsuhiko Nakajima to win the GHC Heavyweight Championship for the first time. Other top matches included Daisuke Harada successfully defending the GHC Junior Heavyweight Championship against Super Crazy, and Atsushi Kotoge and Yo-Hey defeated Stinger (Hayata and Yuya Susumu) to win the GHC Junior Heavyweight Tag Team Championship.

== Storylines ==
The event featured ten professional wrestling matches that resulted from scripted storylines, where wrestlers portrayed villains, heroes, or less distinguishable characters in the scripted events that built tension and culminated in a wrestling match or series of matches.

== Event ==
The event started with the internal stable clash of Funky Express' teams of King Tany and Mohammed Yone, and Akitoshi Saito and Masao Inoue solded with the victory of the preceding team. In the second match, Nio defeated Kinya Okada in singles action. Next, Kotaro Suzuki and Nosawa Rongai picked up a victory over Yasutaka Yano and Yoshinari Ogawa. The fourth bout saw Aleja, Hajime Ohara and Tadasuke defeating Hao, Junta Miyawaki and Kai Fujimura in six-man tag team action. Aleja, began showing compassion towards real life brother Kai Fujimura, after stopping Tadasuke's attack on him, hinting his defection from Kongo which eventually happened two days later on February 25 at "Noah Step Forwrard". Next, Kendo Kashin vs. Masato Tanaka ended in a double count-out. In the sixth match, Naomichi Marufuji and Takashi Sugiura defeated Masa Kitamiya and Yoshiki Inamura. The seventh bout saw Atsushi Kotoge and Yo-Hey defeating Hayata and Yuya Susumu to win the GHC Junior Heavyweight Tag Team Championship. Next up, Daisuke Harada retained the GHC Junior Heavyweight Championship for the second time in a row against Super Crazy. In the semi main event, the team of Daiki Inaba, Go Shiozaki and Kaito Kiyomiya defeated Kongo (Kenoh, Manabu Soya and Masakatsu Funaki).

In the main event, Kazuyuki Fujita defeated Katsuhiko Nakajima to win the GHC Heavyweight Championship for the first time in his career, ending Nakajima's reign at 136 days. After the match concluded, Fujita received a challenge from Takashi Sugiura.

== Results ==
| No. | Results | Stipulations | Times |
|---|---|---|---|
| 1 | Funky Express (King Tany and Mohammed Yone) defeated Funky Express (Akitoshi Saito and Masao Inoue) by pinfall | Tag team match | 11:58 |
| 2 | Nioh defeated Kinya Okada by pinfall | Singles match | 9:58 |
| 3 | Los Perros del Mal de Japón (Kotaro Suzuki and Nosawa Rongai) defeated Yasutaka Yano and Yoshinari Ogawa by pinfall | Tag team match | 6:42 |
| 4 | Kongo (Aleja, Hajime Ohara and Tadasuke) defeated Hao, Junta Miyawaki and Kai Fujimura by pinfall | Six-man tag team match | 14:12 |
| 5 | Kendo Kashin vs. Masato Tanaka ended in a double count-out | Singles match | 11:01 |
| 6 | Naomichi Marufuji and Takashi Sugiura defeated Masa Kitamiya and Yoshiki Inamura by pinfall | Tag team match | 20:22 |
| 7 | Atsushi Kotoge and Yo-Hey defeated Stinger (Hayata and Yuya Susumu) (c) by pinfall | Tag team match for the GHC Junior Heavyweight Tag Team Championship | 26:58 |
| 8 | Daisuke Harada (c) defeated Super Crazy by pinfall | Singles match for the GHC Junior Heavyweight Championship | 18:57 |
| 9 | Daiki Inaba, Go Shiozaki and Kaito Kiyomiya defeated Kongo (Kenoh, Manabu Soya and Masakatsu Funaki) by pinfall | Six-man tag team match | 21:21 |
| 10 | Kazuyuki Fujita defeated Katsuhiko Nakajima (c) by pinfall | Singles match for the GHC Heavyweight Championship | 21:11 |
(c) / – the champion(s) heading into the match
