= Noah Great Voyage in Fukuoka 2022 =

2022 Pro Wrestling Noah event

- Promotional poster featuring various wrestlers
- Promotion: CyberFight
- Brand(s): Pro Wrestling Noah
- Date: March 21, 2022
- City: Fukuoka, Japan
- Venue: Fukuoka Convention Center
- Attendance: 697

Pay-per-view chronology
← Previous; Gain Control 2022 In Nagoya	Next → Majestic 2022

Noah Great Voyage in Fukuoka 2022 was a professional wrestling event promoted by CyberFight's sub-brand Pro Wrestling Noah. It took place on March 21, 2022, in Fukuoka, Japan, at the Fukuoka Convention Center. The event aired on CyberAgent's AbemaTV online linear television service and CyberFight's streaming service Wrestle Universe.

== Background ==
=== Storylines ===
The event featured nine professional wrestling matches that resulted from scripted storylines, where wrestlers portrayed villains, heroes, or less distinguishable characters in the scripted events that built tension and culminated in a wrestling match or series of matches.

=== Event ===
The event started with the bout between Kinya Okada, Masa Kitamiya and Yoshiki Inamura and Funky Express (Akitoshi Saito, King Tany and Mohammed Yone), solded with the victory of the preceding team. Next, Kongo (Hajime Ohara, Nio and Tadasuke) defeated Alejandro, Hao and Kai Fujimura in another six-man tag team action match. The third match saw Naomichi Marufuji defeat Yasutaka Yano in singles competition. Next, Hayata and Yoshinari Ogawa picked up a victory over Eita and Super Crazy by disqualification. In the fifth match, Daiki Inaba and Kaito Kiyomiya defeated Daisuke Harada and Junta Miyawaki. Next, Go Shiozaki defeated Masaaki Mochizuki in singles competition. In the seventh match, Atsushi Kotoge and Yo-Hey defended the GHC Junior Heavyweight Tag Team Championship for the first time in that respective reign against Kotaro Suzuki and Nosawa Rongai. In the semi main event, Sugiura-gun (Hideki Suzuki, Kazushi Sakuraba, Kendo Kashin and Takashi Sugiura) defeated Kongo (Katsuhiko Nakajima, Kenoh, Manabu Soya and Masakatsu Funaki) in eight-man tag team action.

The main event portraited the confrontation between Kazuyuki Fujita and Masato Tanaka in which Fujita successfully defended the GHC Heavyweight Championship for the first time in that respective reign.

== Results ==
No.	Results	Stipulations	Times
1	Kinya Okada, Masa Kitamiya and Yoshiki Inamura defeated Funky Express (Akitoshi Saito, King Tany and Mohammed Yone) by pinfall	Six-man tag team match	10:59
2	Kongo (Hajime Ohara, Nio and Tadasuke) defeated Alejandro, Hao and Kai Fujimura by pinfall	Six-man tag team match	13:07
3	Naomichi Marufuji defeated Yasutaka Yano by pinfall	Singles match	11:01
4	Stinger (Hayata and Yoshinari Ogawa) defeated Los Perros del Mal de Japón (Eita and Super Crazy) by disqualification	Six-man tag team match	9:54
5	Daiki Inaba and Kaito Kiyomiya defeated Daisuke Harada and Junta Miyawaki by pinfall	Tag team match	17:33
6	Go Shiozaki defeated Masaaki Mochizuki by pinfall	Singles match	16:49
7	Atsushi Kotoge and Yo-Hey (c) defeated Los Perros del Mal de Japón (Kotaro Suzuki and Nosawa Rongai) by pinfall	Tag team match for the GHC Junior Heavyweight Tag Team Championship	23:06
8	Sugiura-gun (Hideki Suzuki, Kazushi Sakuraba, Kendo Kashin and Takashi Sugiura) defeated Kongo (Katsuhiko Nakajima, Kenoh, Manabu Soya and Masakatsu Funaki) by pinfall	Eight-man tag team match	18:22
9	Kazuyuki Fujita (c) defeated Masato Tanaka by pinfall	Singles match for the GHC Heavyweight Championship	31:28
(c) / – the champion(s) heading into the match
