= Kongo (professional wrestling) =

Professional wrestling stable

- Logo of the stable

Stable
- Members: See below
- Debut: May 4, 2019
- Disbanded: June 24, 2023
- Years active: 2019–2023

Kongo (金剛, Kongō) was a Japanese professional wrestling stable, based in the Pro Wrestling Noah (Noah) promotion. It was founded and led by Kenoh between 2019 and 2023.

== History ==
=== Formation ===
On the finals night of the 2019 edition of the Global Tag League from May 4, Kenoh, Masa Kitamiya, Atsushi Kotoge and Yoshiki Inamura allegedly founded the unit after they protested against Noah's new ownership under Lidet Entertainment.

=== Under Kenoh's leadership (2019–2023) ===
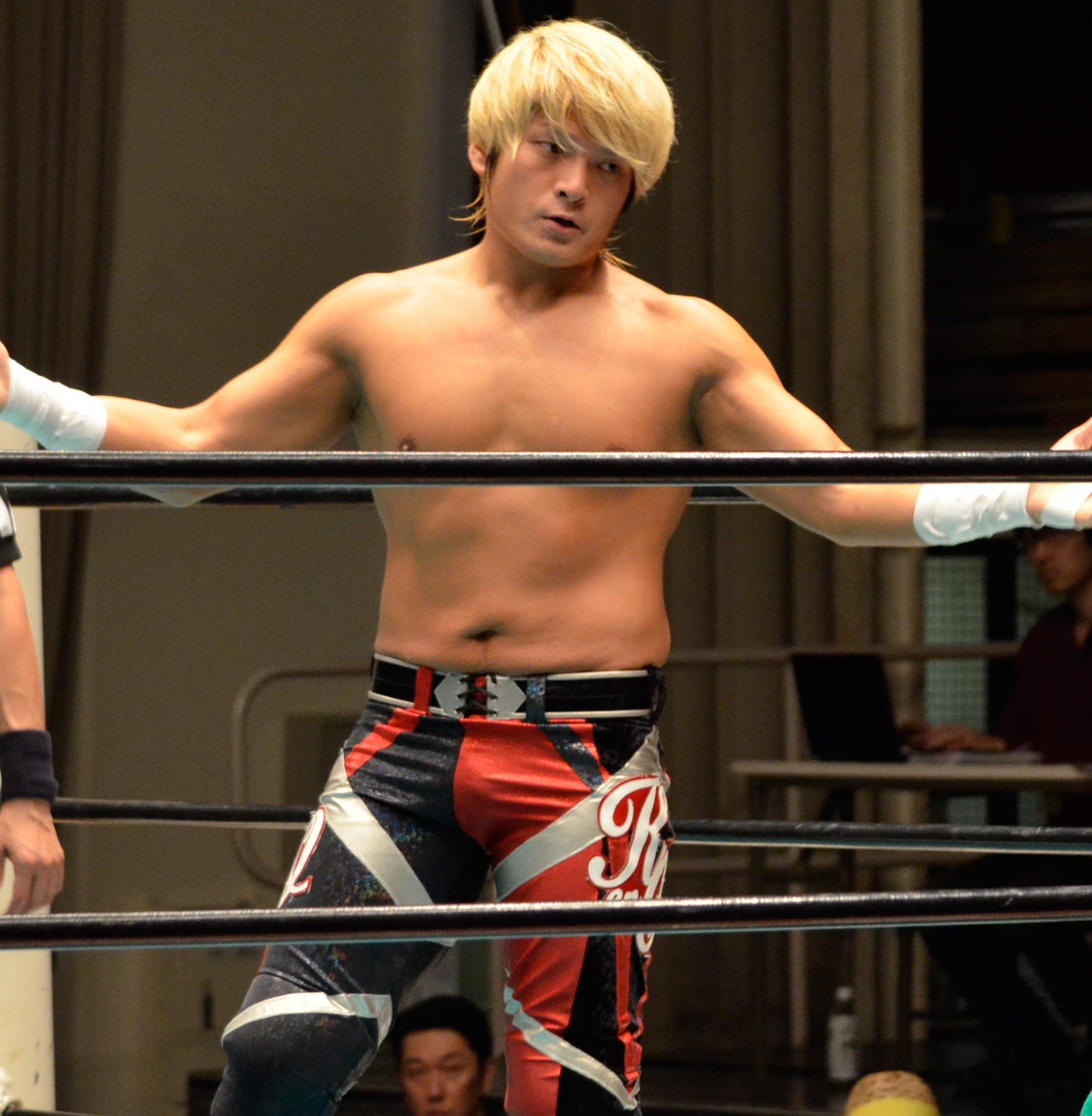
First and only leader of the stable, Kenoh.

At Noah Kawasaki Go on August 30, 2020, after he alongside "AXIZ" tag team partner Go Shiozaki dropped the GHC Tag Team Championship to Naomichi Marufuji and Masaaki Mochizuki, Katsuhiko Nakajima betrayed Shiozaki and aligned himself with Kongo after shaking hands with Kenoh.

At Noah The Glory 2021 on April 29, Katsuhiko Nakajima and Nio defeated Akitoshi Saito and Junta Miyawaki in tag team competition, and Masa Kitamiya unsuccessfully challenged Keiji Muto for the GHC Heavyweight Championship. At Noah Mitsuharu Misawa Memorial 2021 on May 31, Kenoh, Manabu Soya, Nio and Tadasuke defeated Junta Miyawaki, Kaito Kiyomiya, Kinya Okada and Yoshiki Inamura in eight-man tag team action, and Katsuhiko Nakajima and Masa Kitamiya successfully defended the GHC Tag Team Championship against Funky Express (Mohammed Yone and Shuhei Taniguchi). At CyberFight Festival 2021 on June 6, Kenoh, Katsuhiko Nakajima, Manabu Soya, Haoh, Nioh and Tadasuke teamed up in a losing effort against Team DDT (Sanshiro Takagi, Akito, Kazusada Higuchi, Yukio Sakaguchi, Naomi Yoshimura and Yukio Naya) in five-way tag team competition. At Noah Cross Over in Sendai 2021 on July 11, Hao and Tadasuke unsuccessfully challenged Hao and Tadasuke for the GHC Junior Heavyweight Tag Team Championship. At Noah Cross Over in Hiroshima 2021 on August 1, Aleja, Kenoh and Tadasuke defeated Daiki Inaba, Junta Miyawaki and Masa Kitamiya in six-man tag team action, and Hao, Katsuhiko Nakajima and Nio fell short to Sugiura-gun (Kazuyuki Fujita, Kendo Kashin and Takashi Sugiura) in the same type of bout. At Noah Grand Square 2021 on October 10, Hao, Nio and Tadasuke fell short to Funky Express (Akitoshi Saito, King Tany and Mohammed Yone) in six-man tag team action, Aleja and Manabu Soya defeated Junta Miyawaki and Masa Kitamiya in tag team action, Kenoh teamed up with Kaito Kiyomiya to defeat Kazushi Sakuraba and Keiji Muto, and Katsuhiko Nakajima defeated Naomichi Marufuji to win the GHC Heavyweight Championship. At Noah Demolition Stage 2021 on November 13, Hao, Katsuhiko Nakajima, Manabu Soya and Nio defeated Momo No Seishun Tag (Atsushi Kotoge and Daisuke Harada), Daiki Inaba and Kinya Okada in eight-man tag team action, and Kenoh defeated Masaaki Mochizuki to win the GHC National Championship. At Noah The Best 2021 on November 28, Aleja, Hao, Manabu Soya, Nio and Tadasuke fell short to Momo No Seishun Tag (Atsushi Kotoge and Daisuke Harada), Hajime Ohara, Kaito Kiyomiya and Yasutaka Yano in ten-man tag team action, and Kenoh drew against Katsuhiko Nakajima in a winner takes all bout disputed for both Kenoh's GHC National Championship and Nakajima's GHC Heavyweight Championship.

At Noah The New Year 2022 on January 1, Manabu Soya, Nio and Tadasuke fell short to Funky Express (Akitoshi Saito, King Tany and Mohammed Yone), Aleja and Hao defeated Stinger (Seiki Yoshioka and Yuya Susumu), and Kenoh successfully defended the GHC National Championship against Kaito Kiyomiya. At Noah Bumper Crop 2022 In Sendai on January 16, Haoh turned on the stable, and Kenoh and Manabu Soya unsuccessfully challenged M's Alliance (Keiji Muto and Naomichi Marufuji) for the GHC Tag Team Championship. At Noah Higher Ground 2022 on January 22, Hao went into a time-limit draw against former tag team partner Nio after betraying the stable. In the main event, leader Kenoh dropped the GHC National Championship to Masakatsu Funaki. At Noah Gain Control 2022 In Nagoya on February 23, Aleja, Hajime Ohara and Tadasuke defeated Hao, Junta Miyawaki and Kai Fujimura. Aleja began showing compassion towards real life brother Kai Fujimura, after stopping Tadasuke's attack on him. Two days later at "Noah Step Forwrard", after growing unsatisfied with Tadasuke's actions, Aleja decided to turn on Tadasuke, and left Kongo, defecting to "Noah Juniors", before reverting to his previous ring name "Alejandro". At Noah Great Voyage in Fukuoka 2022 on March 21, (Katsuhiko Nakajima, Kenoh, Manabu Soya and Masakatsu Funaki teamed up in a losing effort against Sugiura-gun (Hideki Suzuki, Kazushi Sakuraba, Kendo Kashin and Takashi Sugiura). On the first night of the Noah Majestic 2022 event from April 29, Hajime Ohara, Tadasuke and Shuji Kondo fell short to Los Perros del Mal de Japón (El Texano Jr., Nosawa Rongai and Super Crazy) and Nio fell short to Hao. On the second night from April 30, Hajime Ohara, Manabu Soya and Tadasuke defeated Funky Express (Akitoshi Saito, King Tany and Mohammed Yone), Masakatsu Funaki successfully retained the GHC National Championship against Simon Gotch, and Katsuhiko Nakajima and Kenoh unsuccessfully challenged Sugiura-gun (Hideki Suzuki and Takashi Sugiura) for the GHC Tag Team Championship. At Noah Dream On Final 2022 on May 21, Hajime Ohara, Hi69, Tadasuke and Shuji Kondo defeated Momo No Seishun Tag (Atsushi Kotoge and Daisuke Harada), Hao and Yo-Hey, Katsuhiko Nakajima, Manabu Soya and Masakatsu Funaki fell short to Sugiura-gun (Hideki Suzuki and Takashi Sugiura) and Masaaki Mochizuki, and Kenoh defeated Simon Gotch. At CyberFight Festival 2022 on June 12, Katsuhiko Nakajima teamed up with Atsushi Kotoge and Yoshiki Inamura to defeat Burning (Tetsuya Endo and Jun Akiyama) and Kazusada Higuchi, and Kenoh defeated Daisuke Sasaki. At Noah Destination 2022 on July 16, Katsuhiko Nakajima, Manabu Soya and Masakatsu Funaki fell short to Go Shiozaki, Kazuyuki Fujita and Takashi Sugiura, and Kenoh defeated Satoshi Kojima to win the GHC Heavyweight Championship. At Noah Departure 2022 on August 5, Katsuhiko Nakajima and Manabu Soya defeated Anthony Greene and Stallion Rogers, and Hajime Ohara, Hi69, Kenoh and Tadasuke fell short to Alejandro, El Hijo del Santo, Kaito Kiyomiya and Último Dragón. At Noah Grand Ship In Nagoya 2022 on September 25, Hajime Ohara, Hi69 and Tadasuke fell short to Alejandro, Extreme Tiger and Ninja Mack, Katsuhiko Nakajima and Masakatsu Funaki fell short to Kazuyuki Fujita and Keiji Muto, and Kenoh dropped the GHC Heavyweight Championship to Kaito Kiyomiya. At Noah Ariake Triumph 2022 on October 30, Hajime Ohara, Manabu Soya and Shuji Kondo defeated Alejandro, Extreme Tiger and Shuhei Taniguchi, Hi69 and Tadasuke unsuccessfully challenged Stinger (Atsushi Kotoge and Seiki Yoshioka) for the GHC Junior Heavyweight Tag Team Championship, Masakatsu Funaki defended the GHC National Championship against Kazushi Sakuraba, Katsuhiko Nakajima and Kenoh unsuccessfully challenged TakaKoji (Satoshi Kojima and Takashi Sugiura) for the GHC Tag Team Championship. At Noah Global Honored Crown 2022 on November 10, Hajime Ohara and Shuji Kondo defeated Atsushi Kotoge and Seiki Yoshioka to win the GHC Junior Heavyweight Tag Team Championship and Masakatsu Funaki dropped the GHC National Championship to El Hijo del Dr. Wagner Jr. At Noah The Best 2022 on November 23, Hi69 and Tadasuke fell short to Funky Express (Akitoshi Saito and Mohammed Yone), Katsuhiko Nakajima, Kenoh and Manabu Soya fell short to Kaito Kiyomiya, Masa Kitamiya and Satoshi Kojima, and Hajime Ohara and Shuji Kondo dropped the GHC Junior Heavyweight Tag Team Championship to Atsushi Kotoge and Seiki Yoshioka. At N Innovation 2022 on December 23, Hi69 fell short to Shoki Kitamura, and Hajime Ohara, Shuji Kondo and Tadasuke fell short to Alejandro, Andy Wu and Ninja Mack.

At Noah The New Year 2023 on January 1, Hi69, Shuji Kondo and Tadasuke fell short to Alejandro, Dante Leon and Ninja Mack, Katsuhiko Nakajima, Masakatsu Funaki, Manabu Soya and Hajime Ohara got outmatched by Kazuyuki Fujita, Kendo Kashin, Nosawa Rongai and Hiroshi Hase, and Kenoh unsuccessfully challenged Kaito Kiyomiya for the GHC Heavyweight Championship. At The Great Muta Final "Bye-Bye" on January 22, Hajime Ohara and Hi69 defeated Atsushi Kotoge and Seiki Yoshioka, and Kenoh, Katsuhiko Nakajima, Masakatsu Funaki and Manabu Soya fell short to Sugiura-gun (El Hijo de Dr. Wagner Jr. & Takashi Sugiura), Kaito Kiyomiya and Satoshi Kojima.

At Kenoh's Debut 15th Anniversary Show from June 24, 2023, the leader himself announced that Kongo have split amically during a backstage interview.

==== New Japan Pro Wrestling (2022–2023) ====
Due to Pro Wrestling Noah sharing a business partnership with New Japan Pro Wrestling, various members of the stable participated in the latter's biggest yearly event, the Wrestle Kingdom, usually on the second or third night dedicated to inter-promotional prizeless matches. At Wrestle Kingdom 16 on January 8, 2022, Katsuhiko Nakajima, Kenoh, Manabu Soya, Tadasuke, and Aleja fell short to Los Ingobernables de Japón (Tetsuya Naito, Shingo Takagi, Sanada, Bushi, and Hiromu Takahashi). At Wrestle Kingdom 17 on January 21, Tadasuke defeated Bushi, Manabu Soya defeated Sanada, Katsuhiko Nakajima fell short to Shingo Takagi and Kenoh to Tetsuya Naito.

== Members ==
*	Founding member
L	Leader

=== Former members ===
Member		Joined	Left
Kenoh	L*	May 4, 2019	June 24, 2023
Atsushi Kotoge	*	May 4, 2019	July 27, 2019
Yoshiki Inamura	*	May 4, 2019	October 28, 2020
Masa Kitamiya	*	May 4, 2019	May 31, 2021
Tadasuke		August 22, 2020	March 19, 2023
Katsuhiko Nakajima		August 30, 2020	May 4, 2023
Manabu Soya		August 30, 2020	June 24, 2023
Haoh		December 14, 2019	January 16, 2022
Hi69/Nioh		December 14, 2019	May 31, 2023
Aleja		July 23, 2021	February 25, 2022
Masakatsu Funaki		January 22, 2022	June 24, 2023
Hajime Ohara		February 17, 2022	June 24, 2023
Shuji Kondo		April 8, 2022	June 24, 2023

== Championships and accomplishments ==
- All Japan Pro Wrestling
  - AJPW World Tag Team Championship (1 time) – Kenoh and Soya
- Dragon Gate
  - Open the Twin Gate Championship (1 time) – Kenoh and Kondo
- Pro-Wrestling Basara
  - UWA World Trios Championship (1 time, current) – Kondo with Takuya Sugawara and Toru Owashi (Note: Sugawara and Owashi were not part of the stable while holding the titles with Kondo.)
- Pro Wrestling Noah
  - GHC Heavyweight Championship (2 times) – Nakajima and Kenoh
  - GHC National Championship (3 times) – Kenoh (2) and Funaki
  - GHC Tag Team Championship (1 time) – Kitamiya and Nakajima
  - GHC Junior Heavyweight Tag Team Championship (1 time) – Ohara and Kondo
  - N-1 Victory
    - (2019) – Kenoh
    - (2020, 2021) – Nakajima
  - Jr. Team Game/N Innovation U-Cup
    - (2021) – Tadasuke, Aleja, Haoh & Nioh
    - (2022) – Ohara, Kotoge, Daisuke Harada and Junta Miyawaki (Note: Only Hajime Ohara was still part of Kongo by the time the team won the tournament.)
- Pro Wrestling Illustrated
  - Ranked Katsuhiko Nakajima No. 32 of the top 500 singles wrestlers in the PWI 500 in 2022
  - Ranked Kenoh No. 118 of the top 500 singles wrestlers in the PWI 500 in 2022
  - Ranked Masakatsu Funaki No. 223 of the top 500 singles wrestlers in the PWI 500 in 2022
  - Ranked Masa Kitamiya No. 322 of the top 500 singles wrestlers in the PWI 500 in 2019
