= Noah Ariake Triumph 2022 =

2022 Pro Wrestling Noah event

NOAH Ariake Triumph 2022
- Promotional poster featuring Keiji Mutoh
- Promotion: CyberFight
- Brand: Pro Wrestling Noah
- Date: October 30, 2022
- City: Tokyo, Japan
- Venue: Ariake Arena
- Attendance: 3,739

Pay-per-view chronology
← Previous; Grand Ship In Nagoya	Next → Global Honored Crown

NOAH Ariake Triumph 2022 was a professional wrestling event promoted by CyberFight's sub-brand Pro Wrestling Noah. It took place on October 30, 2022, in Tokyo, Japan, at the Ariake Arena. The event aired on CyberAgent's AbemaTV online linear television service and CyberFight's streaming service Wrestle Universe.

== Background ==
=== Storylines ===
The event featured eleven professional wrestling matches that resulted from scripted storylines, where wrestlers portrayed villains, heroes, or less distinguishable characters in the scripted events that built tension and culminated in a wrestling match or series of matches. On Cyberfight festival 2022, Keiji Mutoh announced his retirement from pro wrestling in 2023 due to medical issues and Pro wrestling Noah revealing the retirement tour starting from Destination 2022 in Nippon budokan till the Tokyo dome show.

=== Event ===
The event started with the pre-show confrontation between rookies Taishi Ozawa and Kai Fujimura which concluded with the victory of the latter competitor. The first match of the main card saw Kongo (Hajime Ohara, Manabu Soya and Shuji Kondo) defeating Alejandro, Extreme Tiger and Shuhei Taniguchi in six-man tag team action. Next, Dante Leon and Jack Morris picked up a victory over Daiki Inaba and Yo-Hey. The fourth match portraited a stable clash between Stinger's Chris Ridgeway & Yoshinari Ogawa and Yasutaka Yano who defeated Los Perros del Mal de Japón's Eita, Nosawa Rongai and Super Crazy. Next, El Hijo del Dr. Wagner Jr. and Hideki Suzuki of Sugiura-gun picked up a victory over Masa Kitamiya and Masato Tanaka. In the sixth bout, the first of the five titles put on the line was the GHC Junior Heavyweight Tag Team Championship, which Atsushi Kotoge and Seiki Yoshioka successfully defended against Kongo's Hi69 and Tadasuke. Next, Ninja Mack defeated Hayata by referee's stoppage to capture the GHC Junior Heavyweight Championship, ending the latter's reign at 184 days and 5 defenses. Hayata sustained an injury and was declared unable to continue in the process. In the eighth match, veteran Masakatsu Funaki defeated Kazushi Sakuraba and secured the fifth successful defense of the GHC National Championship. Next, Satoshi Kojima and Takashi Sugiura defeated Kongo's Katsuhiko Nakajima and Kenoh to hit their first successful defense of the GHC Tag Team Championship. The semi main event portraited Keiji Mutoh, Naomichi Marufuji and Yoshiki Inamura defeat New Japan Pro Wrestling's Great Bash Heel (Togi Makabe & Tomoaki Honma) and Hiroshi Tanahashi in one of Mutoh's last appearances in Pro Wrestling Noah.

The main event saw Kaito Kiyomiya marking his first defense of the GHC Heavyweight Championship in his second reign against Kazuyuki Fujita.

== Results ==
No.	Results	Stipulations	Times
1^{P}	Kai Fujimura defeated Taishi Ozawa by pinfall	Singles match	6:08
2	Kongo (Hajime Ohara, Manabu Soya and Shuji Kondo) defeated Alejandro, Extreme Tiger and Shuhei Taniguchi by pinfall	Six-man tag team match	9:08
3	Dante Leon and Jack Morris defeated Daiki Inaba and Yo-Hey by pinfall	Tag team match	11:04
4	Stinger (Chris Ridgeway and Yoshinari Ogawa) and Yasutaka Yano defeated Los Perros del Mal de Japón (Eita, Nosawa Rongai and Super Crazy) by pinfall	Six-man tag team match	13:15
5	Sugiura-gun (El Hijo del Dr. Wagner Jr. and Hideki Suzuki) defeated Masa Kitamiya and Masato Tanaka by pinfall	Tag team match	11:54
6	Stinger (Atsushi Kotoge and Seiki Yoshioka) (c) defeated Kongo (Hi69 and Tadasuke) by pinfall	Tag team match for the GHC Junior Heavyweight Tag Team Championship	13:08
7	Ninja Mack defeated Hayata (c) by referee stoppage	Singles match for the GHC Junior Heavyweight Championship	11:23
8	Masakatsu Funaki (c) defeated Kazushi Sakuraba by referee stoppage	Singles match for the GHC National Championship	3:19
9	TakaKoji (Satoshi Kojima and Takashi Sugiura) (c) defeated Kongo (Katsuhiko Nakajima and Kenoh) by pinfall	Tag team match for the GHC Tag Team Championship	21:23
10	Keiji Mutoh, Naomichi Marufuji and Yoshiki Inamura defeated Great Bash Heel (Togi Makabe and Tomoaki Honma) and Hiroshi Tanahashi by pinfall	Six-man tag team match	20:32
11	Kaito Kiyomiya (c) defeated Kazuyuki Fujita by pinfall	Singles match for the GHC Heavyweight Championship	24:06
(c) / – the champion(s) heading into the match; P / – the match was broadcast on the pre-show
