= Los Perros del Mal de Japón =

Professional wrestling stable

- Logo of Los Perros del Mal de Japón

Stable
- Name(s): Los Perros del Mal de Japón; Los Perros del Mal de Japon
- Members: See below
- Billed from: Japan
- Debut: June 27, 2021
- Disbanded: November 23, 2022
- Years active: 2021–2022

Los Perros del Mal de Japón (ロス・ペロス・デル・マール・デ・ハポン, Rosu Perosu deru Māru de Hapon) (Spanish for "The Evil Dogs of Japan" and often spelled without the accent as Los Perros del Mal de Japon in English-speaking countries), was a Japanese professional wrestling stable that primarily appeared in the Pro Wrestling Noah (Noah) promotion, which was led by Nosawa Rongai. They also competed in Dragon Gate, which they joined in May 2022.

== History ==
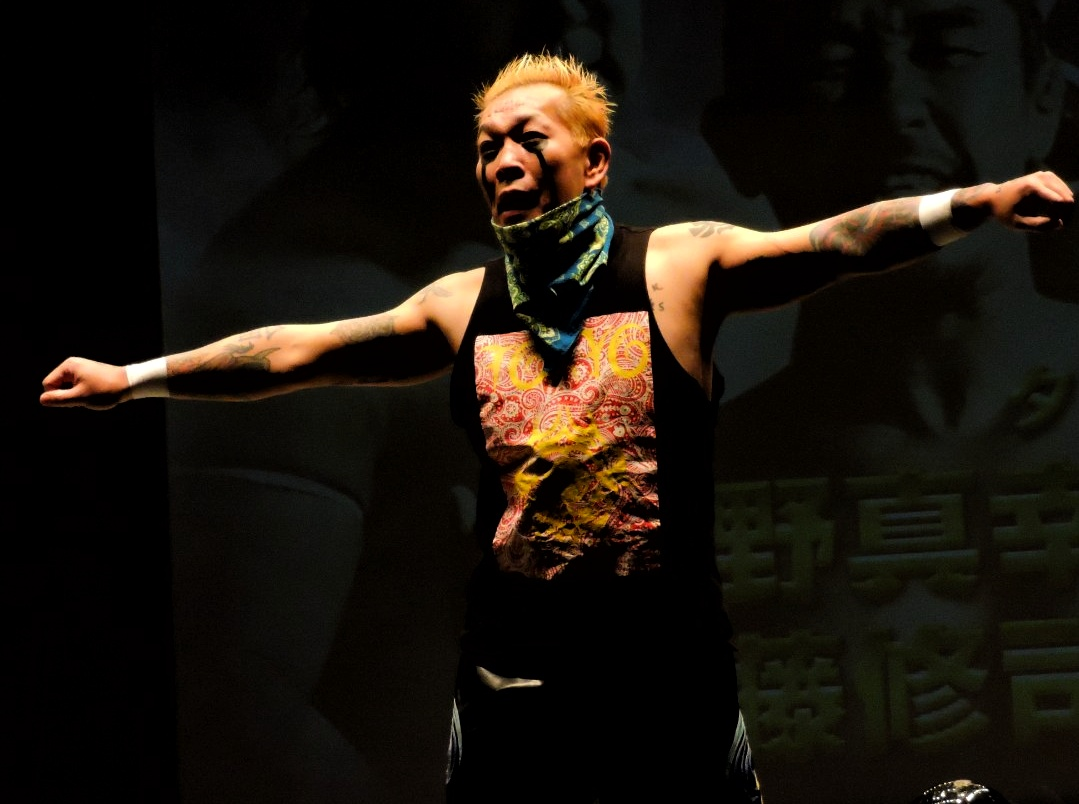
Leader of the stable Nosawa Rongai.

In October 2020, Kotaro Suzuki was kicked out of Stinger following a disagreement with Yoshinari Ogawa and Hayata.

In December, Suzuki aligned himself with Rongai and his mystery partner, who later revealed to be Ikuto Hidaka. Over the following months, the trio continued their rivalry with Stinger, while also being joined by Yo-Hey in May 2021 following the disbandment of Full Throttle. The following month, Dragon Gate wrestler Eita, who had previously worked in Mexican wrestling promotions and met Rongai in 2017, was revealed to be the newest member of the group.

On June 27, at Muta The World, the stable's name was revealed to be dubbed Los Perros del Mal de Japón, as a tribute to the Mexican stable Los Perros del Mal after Eita, Rongai and Yo-Hey won against Stinger (Ogawa, Seiki Yoshioka and Yuya Susumu). A brawl began between the two stables with Suzuki and Ikuto Hidaka coming to help them, outnumbering and overwhelming Stinger. Rongai later revealed that relatives of Perro Aguayo Jr., the founders of the Los Perros del Mal, had granted him permission to use the stable's name.

At Grand Square 2021 In Osaka, Eita and Rongai defeated Atsushi Kotoge and Hajime Ohara to win the GHC Junior Heavyweight Tag Team Championship. On March 13 at Great Voyage in Yokohama, Eita defeated Daisuke Harada to win the GHC Junior Heavyweight Championship, meaning that Los Perros del Mal de Japon had conquered both of Noah's junior heavyweight championships.

At Noah The New Year 2022 on January 1, Eita, Kotaro Suzuki, Nosawa Rongai and Yo-Hey fell short to Hajime Ohara, Momo No Seishun Tag (Atsushi Kotoge and Daisuke Harada) and Último Dragón. At Noah Bumper Crop 2022 In Sendai on January 16, Kotaro Suzuki, Nosawa Rongai and Yo-Hey defeated Kongo (Aleja, Hao and Nio). At Noah Gain Control 2022 In Nagoya on February 23, Kotaro Suzuki and Nosawa Rongai defeated Yasutaka Yano and Yoshinari Ogawa. At Noah Great Voyage in Fukuoka 2022 on March 21, Kotaro Suzuki and Nosawa Rongai unsuccessfully challenged Atsushi Kotoge and Yo-Hey for the GHC Junior Heavyweight Tag Team Championship. On the first night of the Noah Majestic 2022 from April 29, El Texano Jr., Nosawa Rongai and Super Crazy defeated Kongo (Hajime Ohara, Tadasuke and Shuji Kondo). On the second event from April 30, Eita, El Texano Jr., Kotaro Suzuki, Nosawa Rongai and Super Crazy fell short to Stinger (Chris Ridgeway, Hayata, Seiki Yoshioka, Yoshinari Ogawa and Yuya Susumu). For several weeks, Rongai and Suzuki joined Eita at Dragon Gate events under masked personas known as Metal Warriors, before later revealing their identities. At the Dead or Alive 2022 event, the trio won the Open the Triangle Gate Championship in their first match in the promotion. Following the match, Rongai revealed that the rest of the members in NOAH were out of the faction, and that they would continue as a trios team. At Dragongate's Kobe Pro-Wrestling Festival 2022, Super Crazy was in the faction's corner, apparently rejoining the group. The stable members returned to Noah at Noah Departure 2022 on August 5, where they fell short to Kai Fujimura and Stinger (Yoshinari Ogawa and Yuya Susumu). At Noah Grand Ship In Nagoya 2022 on September 25, Eita and Nosawa Rongai defeated Kai Fujimura and Yasutaka Yano. At Noah Ariake Triumph 2022 on October 30, Eita, Nosawa Rongai and Super Crazy fell short to Stinger (Chris Ridgeway and Yoshinari Ogawa) and Yasutaka Yano.

On November 23, 2022, Rongai decided to disband the stable, due to his retirement match which took place on February 21, 2023.

== Reception ==
Similar to Los Ingobernables de Japón in New Japan Pro Wrestling, after Rongai copied the Los Perros del Mal concept he had seen in Mexico, the stable became very popular among the Pro Wrestling Noah audience, with their shirts being sold within a day.

== Members ==
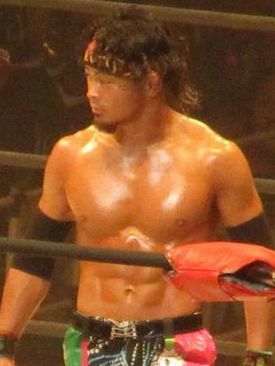
Eita

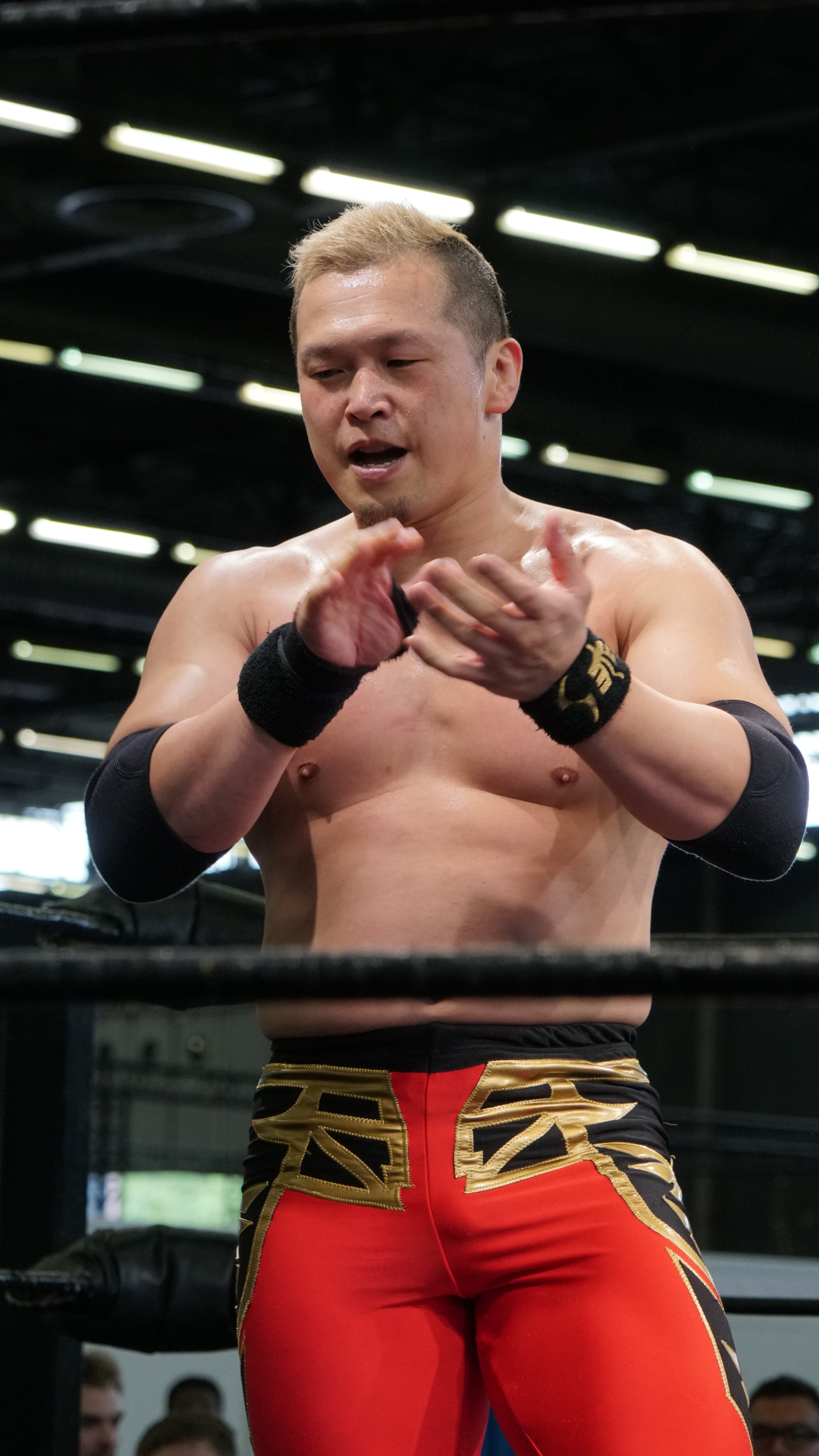
Kotaro Suzuki

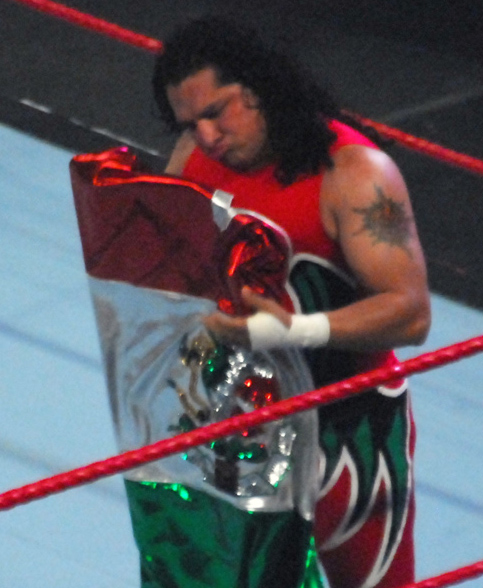
Super Crazy

*	Founding member
I	Leader

Member		Tenure
Eita	*	June 27, 2021–November 23, 2022
Nosawa Rongai	* I	June 27, 2021–November 23, 2022
Kotaro Suzuki	*	June 27, 2021–November 23, 2022
Super Crazy		January 5, 2022–November 22, 2022
Yo-Hey	*	June 27, 2021–February 11, 2022
Ikuto Hidaka	*	June 27, 2021–May 5, 2022
El Texano Jr.		March 23, 2022–May 5, 2022

== Championships and accomplishments ==
- Dragon Gate
  - Open the Triangle Gate Championship (2 times) – Eita, Suzuki and Rongai
- Pro Wrestling Noah
  - GHC Junior Heavyweight Championship (1 time) – Eita
  - GHC Junior Heavyweight Tag Team Championship (1 time) – Eita and Rongai
- Pro Wrestling Illustrated
  - Ranked Eita No. 120 of the top 500 singles wrestlers in the PWI 500 in 2021
  - Ranked El Texano Jr. No. 237 of the top 500 singles wrestlers in the PWI 500 in 2021
  - Ranked Super Crazy No. 449 of the top 500 singles wrestlers in the PWI 500 in 2022
