= Alejandro (Japanese wrestler) =

Japanese professional wrestler

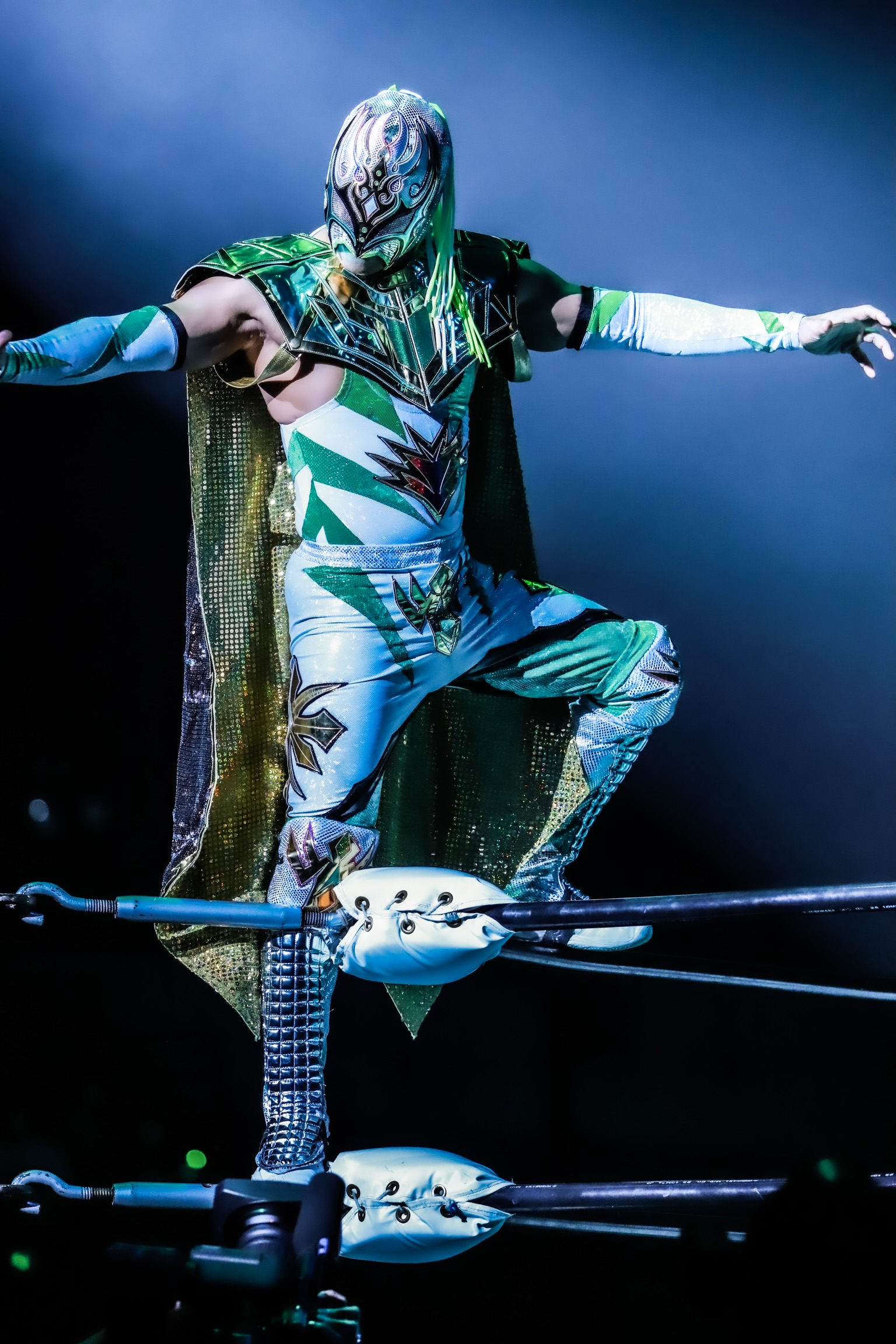
- Alejandro in October 2022

Personal information
- Born: Kohei Fujimura; April 8, 1993 (age 33) Fukuoka, Japan
- Relative: Kai Fujimura (brother)

Professional wrestling career
- Ring name(s): Alejandro; Aleja; Kohei Fujimura; Pantera del Japon
- Billed height: 160 cm (5 ft 3 in)
- Billed weight: 65 kg (143 lb)
- Trained by: Keiji Muto
- Debut: 2016

Kohei Fujimura (藤村康平, Fujimura Kōhei), better known by his ring name Alejandro (アレハンドロ, Arehandoro), is a Japanese professional wrestler currently working for the Japanese promotion Pro Wrestling Noah.

== Professional wrestling career ==
=== Independent circuit (2016–present) ===
Fujimura is known for some freelance work as he competed for various promotions from the Japanese independent scene. At a house show promoted by Big Japan Pro Wrestling on November 26, 2020, Fujimura teamed up with Fuminori Abe and Yusuke Kodama to defeat Drew Parker, Kosuke Sato and Kota Sekifuda in a six-man tag team match. At Road to Blood X'mas 2020, an event promoted by Pro Wrestling Freedoms on December 10, he teamed up with Brahman Brothers (Brahman Kei and Brahman Shu) in a losing effort against Gentaro, Mammoth Sasaki and Violento Jack. On the third night of the AJPW New Year Wars 2021 from January 24, he teamed up with Carbell Ito and Takao Omori in a losing effort against Evolution (Dan Tamura & Hikaru Sato) and Rambo Kawamura.

=== Wrestle-1 (2016–2020) ===
Fujimura made his professional wrestling debut in Wrestle-1 under his real name on the fifth night of the W-1 WRESTLE-1 Tour 2016 Trans Magic from March 20, where he fell short to Kumagoro in singles competition. He competed in one of the promotion's signature events, the Wrestle-1 Tag League where he made his only appearance at the 2019 edition where he teamed up with Masayuki Kono, placing themselves in the block A where they scored a total of two points after going against the teams of Shotaro Ashino and Yusuke Kodama, T-Hawk and Shigehiro Irie, and Jun Tonsho and Pegaso Illuminar.

During his time in the promotion, he chased for various championships. At W-1 WRESTLE-1 Tour 2017 W-Impact on February 22, he teamed up with his "New Era" stablemates Daiki Inaba and Yusuke Kodama and defeated Jun Kasai, Nosawa Rongai and Shuji Kondo for the UWA World Trios Championship. The only major title he has held in the promotion was the Wrestle-1 Tag Team Championship which he won at Wrestle Wars 2019 on March 21, by teaming up with Masayuki Kono and defeating Kaz Hayashi and Pegaso Iluminar for the vacant titles. On April 1, 2020, at W-1 WRESTLE-1 Tour 2020 Trans Magic, Wrestle-1 has held its last event before closure. Fujimura competed two times. First in a winning effort against Kai Fujimura, and secondly, in a battle royal won by Manabu Soya and featuring various other members of the roster such as Cima, El Hijo del Pantera, El Lindaman, Hiroshi Yamato, Jiro Kuroshio, Ryota Hama, Yasufumi Nakanoue, Shotaro Ashino, and many others.

=== Pro Wrestling Noah (2018; 2021–present) ===
Fujimura made his first appearance in Pro Wrestling Noah at Kawasaki Sports Association 70th Anniversary on August 18, 2018, where he teamed up with El Hijo del Pantera, Junta Miyawaki and Masao Inoue in a losing effort against Cody Hall, Kazma Sakamoto, Maybach Taniguchi and Mitsuya Nagai in a one-time appearance as a guest competitor.

Fujimura made his official debut in the company as "Aleja" at the 2021 edition of the Jr. Team Game from July 27, where he was announced as the newest member of Kongo and teamed up with stablemates Tadasuke, haoh and Nioh to win the whole competition after competing against the teams of Noah Seiki gun (Daisuke Harada, Atsushi Kotoge, Hajime Ohara and Junta Miyawaki), Stinger (Hayata, Yoshinari Ogawa, Seiki Yoshioka and Yuya Susumu), and Perros del Mal de Japon (Nosawa Rongai, Yo-Hey, Kotaro Suzuki and Ikuto Hidaka). At the 2022 edition of the event, he teamed up again with Tadasuke, Haoh and Nio, falling short to Noah Seiki gun (Daisuke Harada, Atsushi Kotoge, Hajime Ohara and Junta Miyawaki) in the finals. At the 2022 edition of the N Innovation U-Cup, Fujimura competed in the traditional rumble match won by Daisuke Harada and also involving Nosawa Rongai, Yoshinari Ogawa, Eita and various other competitors from the junior division.

Fujimura competed in various of the promotion's flagship events. At Noah Bumper Crop 2022 In Sendai on January 16, he teamed up with Kongo stablemates Haoh and Nioh in a losing effort against Perros del Mal de Japon (Kotaro Suzuki, Nosawa Rongai and Yo-Hey). The same night, Hao betrayed the stable and Fujimura teamed again with Nioh but fell short to Hao and Daisuke Harada. At Noah Gain Control 2022 In Nagoya on February 23, he teamed up with Hajime Ohara and Tadasuke to defeat Hao, Junta Miyawaki and Kai Fujimura. At Noah Gain Control 2022 In Nagoya on February 23, 2022, Fujimura teamed up with stablemates Hajime Ohara and Tadasuke and picked up a victory over Hao, Junta Miyawaki and Kai Fujimura. He began showing compassion towards real life brother Kai Fujimura, after stopping Tadasuke's attack on him. Two days later at "Noah Step Forwrard", after growing unsatisfied with Tadasuke's actions, Fujimura decided to turn on Tadasuke, and left Kongo, defecting to "Noah Juniors", before reverting to his previous ring name "Alejandro". At Noah Great Voyage in Fukuoka 2022, Fujimura aligned with teammates Hao and Kai Fujimura and fell short to former Kongo stablemates Hajime Ohara, Nio and Tadasuke. On the first night of the Noah Majestic 2022 event from April 29, he teamed up with Daisuke Harada and Junta Miyawaki in a losing effort against Z-Brats (H.Y.O, SB Kento and Shun Skywalker). At the April 30 show, he teamed up with Yasutaka Yano in a losing effort against Kai Fujimura and Slex. At Noah Departure 2022 on August 5, Fujimura teamed up with El Hijo del Santo, Kaito Kiyomiya and Último Dragón and defeated Kongo (Hajime Ohara, Hi69, Kenoh and Tadasuke). At Noah Grand Ship In Nagoya 2022 on September 25, he teamed up with Extreme Tiger and Ninja Mack to defeat Hajime Ohara, Hi69 and Tadasuke. At Noah Ariake Triumph 2022 on October 30, he teamed up with Extreme Tiger and Shuhei Taniguchi in a losing effort against Hajime Ohara, Manabu Soya and Shuji Kondo. At Noah The Best 2022 on November 23, he teamed up with Amakusa to defeat Dante Leon and Yo-Hey. At N Innovation 2022 on December 23, he teamed up with Andy Wu and Ninja Mack to defeat Hajime Ohara, Shuji Kondo and Tadasuke.

At Noah The New Year 2023 on January 1, Fujimura teamed up with Dante Leon and Ninja Mack to defeat Hi69, Shuji Kondo and Tadasuke. At The Great Muta Final "Bye-Bye" on January 22, he teamed up with Junta Miyawaki and Yasutaka Yano to defeat Yoshinari Ogawa, Eita and Nosawa Rongai.

=== New Japan Pro Wrestling (2022–present) ===
Due to Pro Wrestling Noah sharing a business partnership with New Japan Pro Wrestling, Fujimura competed in the latter's biggest yearly event, the Wrestle Kingdom, usually on the second or third night dedicated to inter-promotional prizeless matches. At Wrestle Kingdom 16 on January 8, 2022, he teamed up with Kongo stablemates Katsuhiko Nakajima, Kenoh, Manabu Soya, Tadasuke in a losing effort against Los Ingobernables de Japón (Tetsuya Naito, Shingo Takagi, Sanada, Bushi, and Hiromu Takahashi). At Wrestle Kingdom 17 on January 21, 2023, he teamed up with Junta Miyawaki and Amakusa to defeat Master Wato, Ryusuke Taguchi and Tiger Mask.

== Personal life ==
His real life brother, fellow professional wrestler Kai Fujimura is also evolving in Pro Wrestling Noah.

== Championships and accomplishments ==
- Dragongate
  - Open the Twin Gate Championship (1 time) – with Kaito Kiyomiya
- Kyushu Pro-Wrestling
  - Kyushu Pro-Wrestling Tag Team Championship (1 time) – with Mentai☆Kid
- Pro Wrestling Noah
  - GHC Junior Heavyweight Tag Team Championship (1 time) – with Dragon Bane
  - Jr. Team Game (2021) – with Tadasuke, Haoh and Nioh
  - Jr. Tag League (2026) – with Dragon Bane
- Wrestle-1
  - Wrestle-1 Tag Team Championship (1 time) – with Masayuki Kono
  - UWA World Trios Championship (1 time) – with Yusuke Kodama and Daiki Inaba
  - WRESTLE-1 Cruiser Festival (2018)
