= Noah Global Honored Crown 2022 =

2022 Pro Wrestling Noah event

NOAH Global Honored Crown 2022
- Promotional poster featuring various wrestlers
- Promotion: CyberFight
- Brand: Pro Wrestling Noah
- Date: November 10, 2022
- City: Tokyo, Japan
- Venue: Korakuen Hall
- Attendance: 789

Pay-per-view chronology
← Previous; Ariake Triumph	Next → The Best 2022

NOAH Global Honored Crown 2022 was a professional wrestling event promoted by CyberFight's sub-brand Pro Wrestling Noah. It took place on November 10, 2022, in Tokyo, Japan, at the Korakuen Hall. The event aired on CyberAgent's AbemaTV online linear television service and CyberFight's streaming service Wrestle Universe.

== Background ==
=== Storylines ===
The event featured six professional wrestling matches that resulted from scripted storylines, where wrestlers portrayed villains, heroes, or less distinguishable characters in the scripted events that built tension and culminated in a wrestling match or series of matches.

=== Event ===
The event has been opened by the confrontation between the rookie teams of Daishi Ozawa and Yasutaka Yano, and Kai Fujimura and Yoshiki Inamura, bout solded with the victory of the latter team. In the second match, Kongo (Hajime Ohara and Shuji Kondo) defeated Stinger (Atsushi Kotoge and Seiki Yoshioka) to win the GHC Junior Heavyweight Tag Team Championship. The next bout saw Dante Leon defeating Ninja Mack to win the GHC Junior Heavyweight Championship for the first time in his career. Next, Satoshi Kojima and Takashi Sugiura successfully defended the GHC Tag Team Championship for the second time in a row against Akitoshi Saito and Mohammed Yone. The semi main event saw El Hijo del Dr. Wagner Jr. taking the GHC National Championship from Masakatsu Funaki, ending the latter's reign at 292 days which was the longest till its date.

In the main event, Timothy Thatcher clashed with Kaito Kiyomiya in a bout for the GHC Heavyweight Championship which concluded with Kiyomiya securing his second defense over the title.

== Results ==
No.	Results	Stipulations	Times
1	Kai Fujimura and Yoshiki Inamura defeated Taishi Ozawa and Yasutaka Yano by pinfall	Tag team match	10:25
2	Kongo (Hajime Ohara and Shuji Kondo) defeated Stinger (Atsushi Kotoge and Seiki Yoshioka) (c) by pinfall	Tag team match for the GHC Junior Heavyweight Tag Team Championship	20:37
3	Dante Leon defeated Ninja Mack (c) by pinfall	Singles match for the GHC Junior Heavyweight Championship	12:49
4	TakaKoji (Satoshi Kojima and Takashi Sugiura) (c) defeated Funky Express (Akitoshi Saito and Mohammed Yone) by pinfall	Tag team match for the GHC Tag Team Championship	22:54
5	El Hijo del Dr. Wagner Jr. defeated Masakatsu Funaki (c) by pinfall	Singles match for the GHC National Championship	13:03
6	Kaito Kiyomiya (c) defeated Timothy Thatcher by pinfall	Singles match for the GHC Heavyweight Championship	37:27
(c) / – the champion(s) heading into the match
