= Junta Miyawaki =

Japanese professional wrestler

Personal information
- Born: June 14, 1997 (age 29) Takamatsu, Japan

Professional wrestling career
- Ring name: Junta Miyawaki
- Billed height: 170 cm (5 ft 7 in)
- Billed weight: 80 kg (176 lb)
- Trained by: Hitoshi Kumano
- Debut: August 12, 2016

Junta Miyawaki (宮脇純太, Miyawaki Junta) is a Japanese professional wrestler. He is signed to the Japanese promotion Pro Wrestling Noah. He also performs for DDT Pro-Wrestling (DDT), where he is one-half of the KO-D Tag Team Champions (with Shinya Aoki) in their first reign as a team and individually.

== Professional wrestling career ==
=== Independent circuit (2016–present) ===
Miyawaki is known for seldomly competing for various promotions from the Japanese independent scene. He competed in Pro Wrestling Zero1's 2021 edition of the Tenkaichi Tournament where he defeated Takumi Baba in the first rounds, Andy Wu in the second rounds, but fell short to Shoki Kitamura in the semifinals from September 9. He competed on the second night of NJPW's Wrestle Kingdom 17 from January 21, where he teamed up with Alejandro and Amakusa to defeat Master Wato, Ryusuke Taguchi and Tiger Mask.

=== Pro Wrestling Noah (2016–present) ===
Miyawaki made his professional wrestling debut in Pro Wrestling Noah on the third night of the NOAH Winter Navigation from December 11, 2016, where he competed in a battle royal won by Quiet Storm and also involving Go Shiozaki, Hayata, Akitoshi Saito, Maybach Taniguchi, Mohammed Yone, Ricky Fuji and Rionne Fujiwara.

Miyawaki competed in various of the promotion's signature events. In the Global Junior Heavyweight League, he made his first appearance at the 2018 edition, placing himself in the block B, failing to score any points after competing against Yo-Hey, Ikuto Hidaka, Hi69, Minoru Tanaka and Hayata. At the 2019 edition, he took a spot into the block A, but failed to score any points again after competing against Tadasuke, Yo-Hey, Yoshinari Ogawa, Daisuke Harada and Minoru Tanaka. From the 2020 on, Miyawaki competed in the new format of rumble match. He made his last appearance at the 2022 edition where he got eliminated by Haoh.

As for the Global Junior Heavyweight Tag League, Miyawaki made his first appearance at the 2018 edition where he teamed up with Seiya Morohashi and failed to score any points after competing against the teams of Hayata and Yo-Hey, Hajime Ohara and Hitoshi Kumano, Ikuto Hidaka and Takuya Sugawara, Hi69 and Minoru Tanaka, Ricky Marvin and El Hijo del Pantera and Daisuke Harada and Tadasuke. Next year he teamed with Morohashi again, this time scoring a total of four points after going against Kotaro Suzuki and Yoshinari Ogawa, Hayata and Yo-Hey, Chris Ridgeway and Hitoshi Kumano, Daisuke Harada and Tadasuke, Hi69 and Minoru Tanaka, and Hajime Ohara and Nosawa Rongai. He scored his best result at the 2021 edition which was held under the banner of "N Innovation U-Cup" and under a format of an eight-man tournament, where he alongside his Seiki-gun stablemates Atsushi Kotoge, Daisuke Harada and Hajime Ohara won the whole event in a single block also involving Stinger (Hayata, Yoshinari Ogawa, Seiki Yoshioka and Yuya Susumu), and Los Perros del Mal de Japón (Nosawa Rongai, Yo-Hey, Kotaro Suzuki and Ikuto Hidaka).

Miyawaki competed in various pay-per-view events hosted by the company. At CyberFight Festival 2021 on June 6, he teamed up with Kinya Okada to defeat Yuki Iino and Toui Kojima. At Noah Dream On Final 2022 on May 21, he teamed up with Daiki Inaba in a losing effort against Kai Fujimura and Yoshiki Inamura. Miyawaki returned at N Innovation 2022 on December 23, and challenged Amakusa for the GHC Junior Heavyweight Championship. The match took place at Noah The New Year 2023 on January 1, where Miyawaki came up short. At The Great Muta Final "Bye-Bye" on January 22, 2023, he teamed up with Alejandro and Yasutaka Yano to defeat Yoshinari Ogawa, Eita and Nosawa Rongai. At Noah Great Voyage in Osaka 2023 on February 12, Miyawaki teamed up with Alejandro and challenged Yoshinari Ogawa and Eita for the GHC Junior Heavyweight Tag Team Championship.

== Championships and accomplishments ==
- DDT Pro Wrestling
  - KO-D Tag Team Championship (1 time) – with Shinya Aoki
  - Ironman Heavymetalweight Championship (1 time)
- Pro Wrestling Noah
  - GHC Junior Heavyweight Tag Team Championship (1 time) – with Amakusa
  - N-Innovation Cup/Global Junior Tag League
    - (2021) – with Atsushi Kotoge, Daisuke Harada and Hajime Ohara
    - (2025) – with Amakusa
  - NOAH Dojo Tag Team Tournament (2021) – with Atsushi Kotoge
