= Yo-Hey =

Japanese professional wrestler

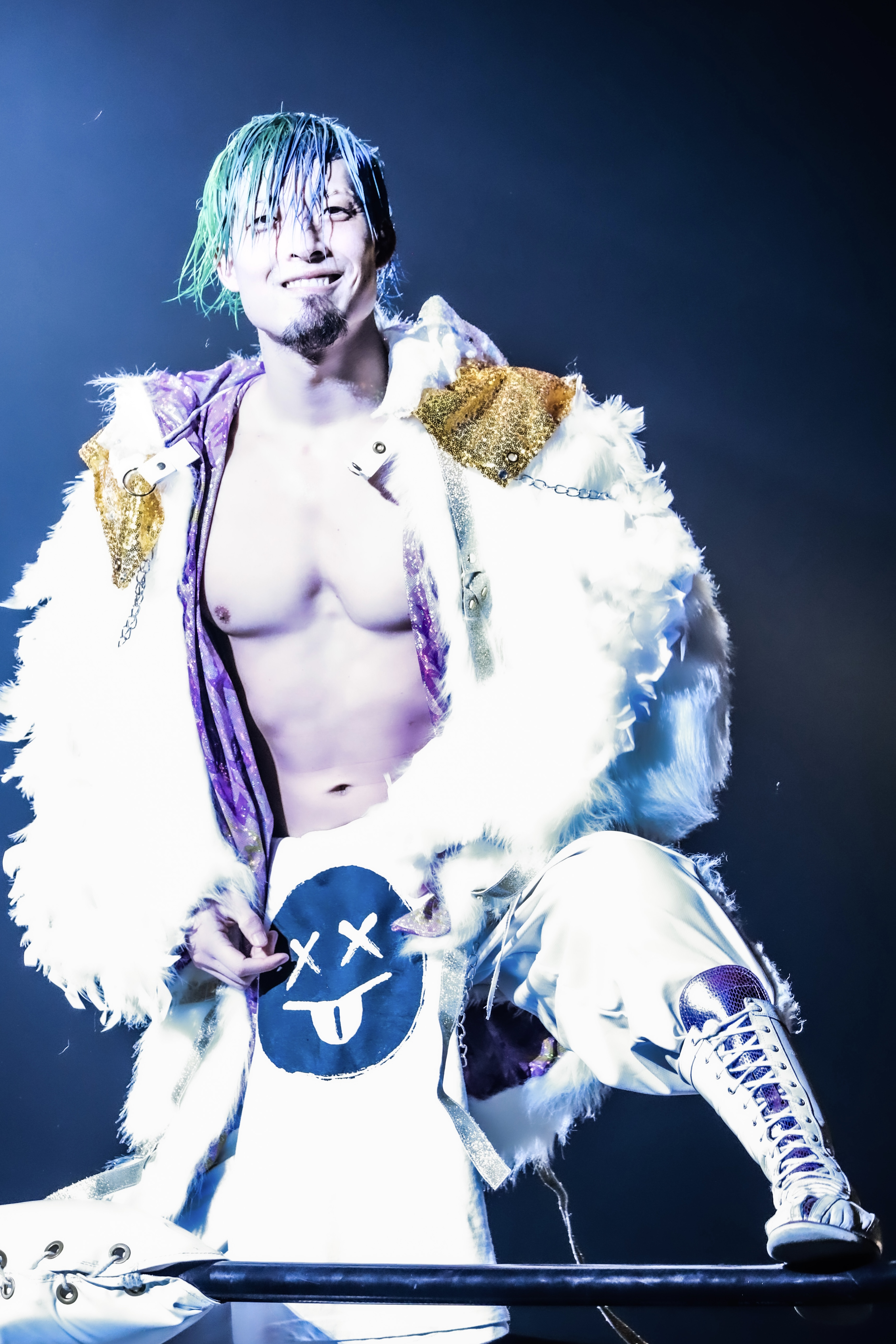
- Yo-Hey in 2022

Personal information
- Born: Yohei Fujita; February 6, 1988 (age 38) Yabu, Hyogo, Japan

Professional wrestling career
- Ring names: Ryoma; Sutchi Yo-Hey; Youhei Fujita; Gillette; Yo-Hey
- Billed height: 1.70 m (5 ft 7 in)
- Billed weight: 70 kg (154 lb)
- Trained by: Dragon Gate Dojo; Funaki Dojo; Cima; Funaki
- Debut: December 22, 2008

Yohei Fujita (藤田 洋平, Fujita Yōhei; born February 6, 1988), better known by his ring name Yo-Hey (stylised in all capital letters), is a Japanese professional wrestler. He is signed to Pro Wrestling Noah (Noah), where he is a member of Team 2000X. He is currently in his 8th GHC Junior Heavyweight Tag Team Championship reign alongside Jun Masaoka.

Fujita started his career in Dragon Gate (DG) under the ring name Ryoma (stylised in all capitals); his ring name being a tribute to former Japanese movement leader Sakamoto Ryōma. In 2009, Fujita left Dragon Gate due to an animal abuse scandal, and took an extended hiatus from professional wrestling until he returned in 2011 for Smash. He later wrestled for Wrestling New Classic (WNC) until 2013 when he left to become a freelancer, before signing with Noah in September 2017.

== Early life ==
Fujita has a background in Shorinji Kempo, baseball, soccer, and judo. After graduating from the Human Academy Sports College, he began training in the Dragon Gate dojo.

== Professional wrestling career ==
=== Dragon Gate (2008–2009) ===
Fujita made his debut in Dragon Gate (DG) under his real name on December 22, 2008, against Kenshin Chikano. On March 20, 2009, during a Nex show, he joined Warriors-5 and changed his ring name to Ryoma in tribute to Sakamoto Ryōma. In mid 2009, an animal abuse scandal caused an uproar in Dragon Gate surrounding the pet monkey, Cora. Fujita was one of the accused wrestlers who were involved in the abuse of Cora and was put on an indefinite disciplinary measure. Then, Fujita announced his retirement from pro-wrestling due to the issues that were surrounding the whole situation.

=== Smash and Wrestling New Classic (2011–2013) ===
In 2011, Fujita moved to the United States for a short stay in the Funaki Dojo, run by Shoichi Funaki. He then returned to Japan under the ring name Yo-Hey and received a tryout match in Smash, which he passed. He made his re-debut in 2011, losing to Akira, but would leave Smash later in the year due to a disagreement between Smash owner Tajiri and financial backer Masakazu Sakai. After that, he debuted in Wrestling New Classic alongside Yusuke Kodama, losing to Mikey Whipwreck and Tajiri on May 26, 2012. He left WNC to become a freelancer in 2013.

=== All Japan Pro Wrestling (2012, 2014–2016) ===
In 2012, he began competing in All Japan Pro Wrestling (AJPW) under the ring name Gillette, participating the 2012 AJPW Junior Tag League with Kai, finishing with 4 points and failing to make it to the finals. He would return participating in the 2012 Junior Hyper League finishing his block with 2 points and failing to advance. After that, he would make sporadic appearances as Yo-Hey until 2016 when he made his last appearance, teaming with Sushi and losing to Billyken Kid and Toru.

=== Freelancer (2013–2017) ===
After he left Wrestling New Classic (WNC) in 2013, he began making appearances in Doutonbori Pro Wrestling (DPW) and participated in the 2013 Doutonbori Tag King Decision League with Hayata finishing with 8 points but failing to advance to the finals. He would later begin making appearances in Dove Pro Wrestling, where he participated in the tournament to crown the new #1 contenders to the Dove Pro Tag Team Championship where he and Ippei made in to the finals but lost to Billyken Kid and Rey Paloma. In 2014, he participated in the Dotonbori Saikyou Otoko Tournament, losing to Shoichi Uchida in the 2nd round. In July 2015, he took part in a tryout with WWE. On April 2, 2016, he won his first championship with Kenshin Chikano as the Gingin Boys, defeating Black Buffalo and Tsubasa and Gunso and Hayata for the Dove Pro Tag Team Championship in a TLC match. They lost the titles to Jun Kasai and Gunso on November 26. Afterwards, they would split up due to Yo-Hey's focus on wrestling in Noah.

=== Pro Wrestling Noah (2016–present) ===
==== Ratel's (2017–2026) ====
In December 2016, he began appearing in Pro Wrestling Noah (Noah) after president Masayuki Uchida announced that he would allow freelancers to wrestle in Noah. On January 14, 2017, he made his debut in Noah, defeating Rionne Fujiwara. Later in January 2017, Yo-Hey and Hayata defeated Hi69 and Taiji Ishimori. After the match, Yo-Hey and Hayata stated that they wanted a match for the vacant GHC Junior Heavyweight Tag Team Champions. This led to a feud for the vacant GHC Junior Heavyweight Tag Team Championships between XX (Ishimori and Hi69) and Hayata and Yo-Hey. On February 18, he and Hayata failed to capture the vacant GHC Junior Heavyweight Tag Team Champions, losing to Hi69 and Ishimori. Three days later, Hayata and Yo-Hey came together with Daisuke Harada and Tadasuke to form a new stable named Ratel's. On August 26, Yo-Hey and Hayata defeated XX in a rematch to become the new GHC Junior Heavyweight Tag Team Champions. On September 3, Noah announced that Yo-Hey had signed an exclusive contract with the promotion, ending his days as a freelancer.

On March 17, Yo-Hey entered the ring and attacked Shuji Kondo, Hajime Ohara, and Hi69. Ha saved Tadasuke from their attack before extending his hand to him, who accepted it, leaving Kongo. Later that night, Yo-Hey and Tadasuke were revealed as the newest members of Jake Lee's newest stable Good Looking Guys. On April 16 at Green Journey in Sendai, Yo-Hey and Tadasuke defeated Eita and Yoshinari Ogawa to win the GHC Junior Heavyweight Tag Team Championship. They lost the titles to Stinger (Chris Ridgeway and Daga) on June 22. Yo-Hey and Tadasuke regained the GHC Junior Heavyweight Tag Team Championship on January 2, 2024 at Noah The New Year by defeating Los Golpeadores (Alpha Wolf and Dragon Bane) and Ninja Mack and Alejandro in a three-way match. On July 13 at Destination, Good Looking Guys disbanded. Later that night, Yo-Hey and Tadasuke came out and offered to form an alliance with Hayata. On September 1, Yo-Hey reformed Ratel's with Hayata, Tadasuke, Daisuke Harada and Yuto Kikuchi. On September 1, Yo-Hey and Hayata defeated Eita and Shuji Kondo to win the GHC Junior Heavyweight Tag Team Championship for the third time. They lost the titles to Amakusa and Junta Miyawaki on March 22, 2025.

On May 3, at Memorial Voyage in Kokugikan, Yo-Hey defeated Eita to win the GHC Junior Heavyweight Championship for the first time.

== Championships and accomplishments ==
- Dragon Gate
  - Open the Triangle Gate Championship (1 time) – with Atsushi Kotoge and Daisuke Harada
- Dove Pro Wrestling
  - Dove Pro Tag Team Championship (1 time) – with Kenshin Chikano
- Pro Wrestling Illustrated
  - Ranked No. 119 of the top 500 singles wrestlers in the PWI 500 in 2025
- Pro Wrestling Noah
  - GHC Junior Heavyweight Championship (1 time)
  - GHC Junior Heavyweight Tag Team Championship (8 times, current) – with Hayata (3), Atsushi Kotoge (1), Kzy (1), Tadasuke (2) and Jun Masaoka (1, current)
  - Global Junior Heavyweight Tag League (2017, 2018) – with Hayata
