= Ninja Mack =

American professional wrestler

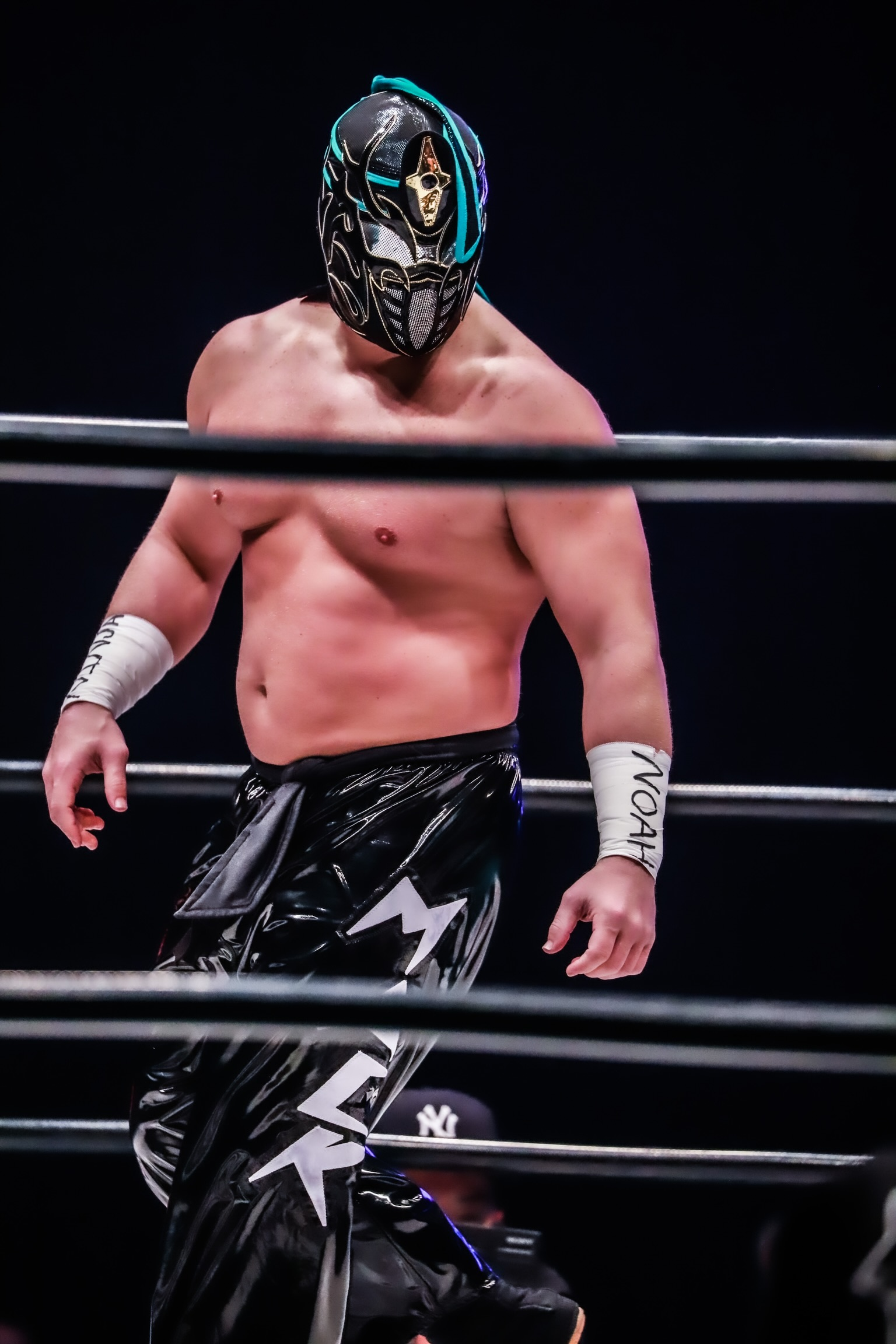
- Mack in October 2022

Personal information
- Born: Brenden McAleavey; December 31, 1989 (age 36) Long Island, New York, U.S.
- Children: 1

Professional wrestling career
- Ring name(s): Kamikaze; Brenden Skye; Capoeira Kid; Ninja Mack
- Billed height: 5 ft 5 in (1.65 m)
- Billed weight: 187 lb (85 kg)
- Trained by: Booker T Low Ki
- Debut: 2014

Brenden McAleavey (born December 31, 1989), better known by his ring name Ninja Mack, is an American professional wrestler currently performing for Pro Wrestling Noah, where he is a one-time GHC Junior Heavyweight Champion and one-time GHC Openweight Hardcore Champion. He also makes appearances on the Game Changer Wrestling (GCW), Juggalo Championship Wrestling (JCW) and independent circuit. He has also made previous appearances Ring of Honor (ROH).

== Early life ==
Born on Long Island, Mack was raised in Cypress, Texas. He has an athletic background, as he competed in amateur wrestling at Cypress Creek High School, he also has trained in Martial Arts as he learned Brazilian Jiu-Jitsu, Mixed Martial Arts, Muay Thai, and Taekwondo, and later worked as a Gymnastics coach at Cypress Academy of Gymnastics. He also toured with Cirque du Soleil, as well as with other circuses in the United States, Mexico, Venezuela and Belgium.

== Professional wrestling career ==
Mack was trained by Booker T, and debuted for Booker's promotion Reality of Wrestling (ROW) in December 2014 under the ring name Brendan Skye. He would continue to make appearances for the Houston promotion over the next two years. He initially wrestled on the independent circuit in Texas, featuring for promotions such as Promociones Martinez, Loko Wrestling, Pale Pro Wrestling and the Independent Wrestling Expo. He also took an extended break from wrestling, following the birth of his son.

=== Game Changer Wrestling (2021–present) ===
Mack's performance in a Loko Wrestling match involving him and Dante Leon attracted the attention of Game Changer Wrestling (GCW). On April 8, 2021, at Jimmy Lloyd's D-Generation F, Mack made his debut for the promotion, winning in a six man scramble match. He later partnered with Leon, in two unsuccessful challenges for the GCW Tag Team Championship, losing to the Second Gear Crew (Mance Warner and Matthew Justice) and The Briscoes (Jay Briscoe and Mark Briscoe). Although he had previously worked unmasked for GCW, Mack would adopt the ninja persona upon the advice of Konnan, after a short stint in Mexico.

=== Lucha Libre AAA Worldwide (2021) ===
In July 2021, Mack worked two dates for Lucha Libre AAA Worldwide (AAA), under the ring name Kamikaze. On July 3, at Verano de Escándalo, he participated in a Trofeo Alas de Oro match, which was won by El Hijo del Vikingo. On July 5, he teamed with Aramís and Dinastía in a loss to Abismo Negro Jr., Arez and Toxin.

=== Pro Wrestling Noah (2022–present) ===
On January 3, 2022, at Reboot, Mack appeared in a "coming soon" video. He had intended to make his debut for Pro Wrestling Noah the previous year as well as in February, but has been unable to enter the country due to Japan's handling of the COVID-19 pandemic and a rise in cases stemming from the omicron variant.

Mack made his debut on April 29 at Majestic – N-Innovation, defeating Alpha Wolf and Dragon Bane in a three way elimination match. On July 16, at Destination, Mack defeated Dante Leon. On October 30, at Ariake Triumph, Mack defeated Hayata for the GHC Junior Heavyweight Championship, his first title in the promotion. Eleven days later, at Global Honored Crown, Mack lost the title in his first defense against Leon.

On February 21, 2023, at the Keiji Muto Grand Final Pro-Wrestling "Last" Love event, Mack teamed with Naomichi Marufuji and El Hijo de Dr. Wagner Jr. in a six-man tag team match, defeating Dragon Gate's Z-Brats (Shun Skywalker, Kai and Diamante). On May 4, at Majestic, Mack failed to win the GHC Junior Heavyweight Championship from Hayata. On September 24, at Grand Ship in Nagoya, Mack teamed with Alejandro and lost to Alpha Wolf and Dragón Bane for the vacant GHC Junior Heavyweight Tag Team Championship.

=== Westside Xtreme Wrestling (2022) ===
On the weekend of March 4–6, 2022, Mack was involved in four matches during the 16 Carat Gold tournament, held by Westside Xtreme Wrestling (wXw). On night one, Mack wrestled in a five way match to qualify as an alternate, which was won by Hektor Invictus. On night two, Mack defeated Ace Romero in a lotterie match to win the vacant wXw Shotgun Championship. The following day, Mack defended the title against Tamás Szabó, and on night three, he dropped the title to Maggot in a four way match that also involved Ender Kara and The Rotation.

=== Ring of Honor (2022) ===
On April 1, 2022, Mack was defeated by Brian Cage at Supercard of Honor XV.

== Championships and accomplishments ==
- Pro Wrestling Illustrated
  - Ranked No. 99 of the top 500 singles wrestlers in the PWI 500 in 2022
- Pro Wrestling Noah
  - GHC Junior Heavyweight Championship (1 time)
  - GHC Openweight Hardcore Championship (1 time)
- Westside Xtreme Wrestling
  - wXw Shotgun Championship (1 time)
- Juggalo Championship Wrestling
  - JCW American Championship (1 time)
