= Yoshinari Ogawa =

Japanese professional wrestler (born 1966)

Personal information
- Born: November 2, 1966 (age 60) Toride, Ibaraki, Japan

Professional wrestling career
- Ring name: Yoshinari Ogawa
- Billed height: 1.80 m (5 ft 11 in)
- Billed weight: 82 kg (181 lb)
- Trained by: All Japan Pro Wrestling; Genichiro Tenryu; Giant Baba; Kazuharu Sonoda
- Debut: September 3, 1985
- Retired: August 13, 2024

Yoshinari Ogawa (小川良成, Ogawa Yoshinari) (born November 2, 1966) is a Japanese retired professional wrestler, best known for his appearances with All Japan Pro Wrestling and Pro Wrestling Noah. He earned the nickname of "Rat Boy" from the English-speaking Puroresu fanbase due to his sneaky, clever in-ring tactics and baiting his opponents into quick pins, as well as the dishevelled, greasy appearance he cultivated during the late-1990s.

== Professional wrestling career ==
=== All Japan Pro Wrestling (1985–2000) ===
Yoshinari Ogawa debuted in All Japan Pro Wrestling in 1985, working on the undercard, until joining Genichiro Tenryu's group Revolution, which helped him elevate higher on the card. He remained in the group until it disbanded in 1990 upon Tenryu's abrupt departure from AJPW.

After Tenryu left, Ogawa became one of the top stars in AJPW's junior heavyweight division in the 1990s, winning the junior heavyweight championship three times. He also reigned as tag team champion with his mentor, Mitsuharu Misawa.

=== Pro Wrestling Noah (2000–2024) ===
Ogawa left AJPW for Misawa's newly formed Pro Wrestling Noah in 2000, where he continued his tag team with Misawa, even winning the GHC Tag Team Championship becoming the second ever champions by defeating the team of Scorpio and Vader, holding the titles for nine days before losing the titles to Takao Omori and Yoshihiro Takayama. On April 7, 2002, he scored a huge upset, beating Jun Akiyama very quickly to become the GHC Heavyweight Champion. Ogawa held the title for 153 days, defending his championship twice against Akira Taue and Takeshi Rikio, before ultimately losing it to Takayama on September 7, 2002. On January 10, 2004, Ogawa and Misawa won the GHC Tag Team Championship for a second time, this time defeating Hiroshi Tanahashi and Yuji Nagata at the Great Voyage 2004 show. The team held the championship for a then-record 379 days while defending the belts seven times, another record at the time. They lost the championships to the team of Scorpio and Doug Williams on January 23, 2005.

Ogawa became a mainstay in the junior heavyweight division forming a partnership with Zack Sabre Jr. starting in 2013 as the pair joined to take part in the NTV G+ Cup Junior Heavyweight Tag League for the vacant GHC Junior Heavyweight Tag Team Championship. The team came in second place in their block losing to eventual block and league winners Jyushin Thunder Liger and Tiger Mask IV on the final day. However, the team defeated Liger and Tiger Mask on December 7, 2013, at 'Great Voyage in Tokyo Vol. 2' to become the tag team champions for the first time. The pair defended their titles for the first, and only, time on March 8, 2014, defeating Kenoh and Hajime Ohara at 'Great Voyage in Tokyo' show. The team lost the titles on March 21, 2014, to the team of Atsushi Kotoge and Taiji Ishimori, but Ogawa and Sabre became two-time champions less than a month later by defeating Kotoge and Ishimori for the championships. Yet again, on July 5, 2014, after just one defense over Hiro Tonai and Shiori Asahi which occurred on May 3, Ogawa and Sabre lost the titles to Kotoge and Ishimori at 'Great Voyage in Tokyo Vol.2'.

The pair entered the 2014 NTV G+ Junior Tag League and finished last in their four-team block with four points. On May 10, 2015, Ogawa and Sabre received a title match against the champions El Desperado and Taka Michinoku at Great Voyage in Yokohama. This match was a losing effort from the team and Ogawa, in the summer of 2015, took part in his first singles tournament since 2008, the Global Junior Heavyweight League. Ogawa finished fifth in the block of seven with six points and victories over Desperado, Hitoshi Kumano, and Sho Tanaka. Ogawa and Sabre took part in their third straight NTV G+ Junior Tag League and finished second, again losing to the eventual block winners, Desperado and Michinoku, on the final day of the league. This match was their final match as a team and on November 30, 2015, Ogawa's six-man team of Hitoshi Kumano and Muhammad Yone defeated Sabre's team of Genba Hirayanagi and Captain Noah with Ogawa scoring the decision over Sabre in what was Sabre's final match in Pro Wrestling Noah.

Ogawa, alongside several Noah company-mates, took part in the first two New Japan Pro-Wrestling 'Lion's Gate Project' shows where he defeated Jay White on the first show on February 25, 2016, then defeated David Finlay on the second show which took place on May 19. Ogawa took part in the qualifying for the 2016 Super J-Cup defeating Hitoshi Kumano in his first qualifier but losing to Taiji Ishimori in the final of his qualifying region.

In 2019, Ogawa won the GHC Junior Heavyweight Tag Team Championship with Kotaro Suzuki and formed a stable named Stinger later joined by Atsushi Kotoge and Chris Ridgeway.

On January 4, 2020, Ogawa defeated Hayata to win the GHC Junior Heavyweight Championship for the first time in his career, thereby completing his win of NOAH's four major GHC titles and becoming the fourth man to do so after Naomichi Marufuji, KENTA and Takashi Sugiura.

On August 13, 2024, it was announced that Ogawa would be retiring due to a neck injury suffered in an eight-man tag team match on August 4, in which his team with Daga, Super Crazy and Yu Owada lost to Tadasuke, HAYATA, AMAKUSA and YO-HEY.

== Championships and accomplishments ==
- All Japan Pro Wrestling

- All Asia Tag Team Championship (1 time) – with Mitsuharu Misawa
- World Junior Heavyweight Championship (3 times)
- World Tag Team Championship (1 time) – with Mitsuharu Misawa
- January 3 Korakuen Hall Junior Heavyweight Battle Royal (1991, 1995)
- World Junior Heavyweight Title League (1998)

- Dragon Gate
  - Open the Triangle Gate Championship (1 time) – with Seiki Yoshioka and Yuya Susumu
- Nikkan Sports
  - Technique Award (1998)
- Pro Wrestling Illustrated
  - Ranked No. 224 of the 500 best singles wrestlers during the "PWI Years" in 2003
- Pro Wrestling Noah

- GHC Heavyweight Championship (1 time)
- GHC Junior Heavyweight Tag Team Championship (9 times) – with Zack Sabre Jr. (2), Minoru Tanaka (1), Kotaro Suzuki (1), Hayata (3), Chris Ridgeway (1) and Eita (1)
- GHC Tag Team Championship (2 times) – with Mitsuharu Misawa
- GHC Junior Heavyweight Championship (1 time)
- Global Junior Heavyweight Tag League (2019) – with Kotaro Suzuki

- Tokyo Sports
  - Technique Award (1996)
