= Hi69 =

Japanese professional wrestler (born 1981)

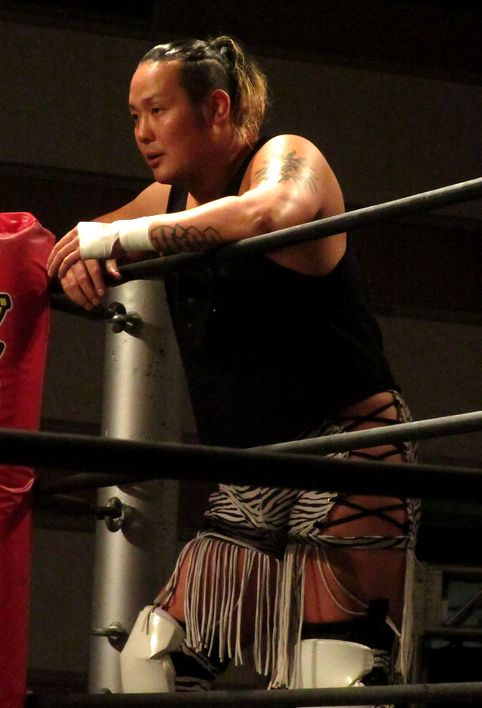
- Tanabe as Hi69 in 2016

Personal information
- Born: Hiroki Tanabe (田辺 裕喜, Tanabe Hiroki); December 13, 1981 (age 44) Morioka, Iwate, Japan

Professional wrestling career
- Ring name(s): Hi69; Hiroki; Panda; Nioh
- Billed height: 1.75 m (5 ft 9 in)
- Billed weight: 95 kg (209 lb)
- Trained by: Kaientai Dojo; Taka Michinoku
- Debut: November 19, 2000

Hiroki Tanabe (田辺 裕喜, Tanabe Hiroki; born December 13, 1981) is a Japanese professional wrestler better known by his ring name Hi69 (pronounced as Hiroki). He is currently signed to Pro Wrestling Noah. Since debuting in 2000, Tanabe has frequently worked for Kaientai Dojo, Michinoku Pro Wrestling, Apache Pro Wrestling and Freedoms.

== Professional wrestling career ==
=== Training and early career ===
Tanabe originally trained in Puerto Rico and was a member of the first graduating class of Taka Michinoku's Kaientai Dojo (K-Dojo). He made his debut on November 19, 2000 under the ring name Hi69. Eventually, he returned to Japan, where he became a regular in both Michinoku Pro Wrestling and All Japan Pro Wrestling during the first two years of his career. Throughout 2002 he took part in AJPW's Giant Baba Cup, finishing last in Block A with zero wins and zero points. Whilst also competing in AJPW, he debuted in Kaientai Dojo where he would become a mainstay for the majority of his career, winning the UWA World Middleweight Championship in October. Throughout 2003, 2004, 2005, 2006 and 2007, he competed regularly in a large number of different promotions, including Big Japan Pro Wrestling, Apache Pro Wrestling, Muga, Real Japan Pro Wrestling, Hustle, and eventually became a regular on New Japan Pro-Wrestling's Lock Up cards. After resigning from K-Dojo in April 2006, he primarily competed in Apache Pro Wrestling. On October 11, 2007, Hi69 was teaming with Tetsuhiro Kuroda and Mammoth Sasaki as Apache Army against GBH (Togi Makabe, Toru Yano and Tomohiro Ishii) when Ishii countered a frankensteiner from Hi69 into a powerbomb which caused him to land awkwardly, suffering a fracture as well as a dislocation to his thoracic vertebrae. After the match, it was announced that the injury was possibly career threatening and that he would require surgery.

=== Return (2010–present) ===
After over two years of surgery, rehabilitation and medical procedures, Hi69 announced his return to the ring in February 2010, stating that he would be splitting his time between K-Dojo and Pro Wrestling Freedoms, and would now be wrestling as Hiroki (stylised in all capital letters), his birth name. In his return match, he teamed with Miyawaki in a loss to his trainer Taka Michinoku and the man he made his debut against, Yasu Urano. On May 26 at a Freedoms show, Hiroki faced Tomohiro Ishii in a match billed as a "revenge match", with Ishii portraying the heel and claiming responsibility for Hiroki's serious injury. The match was won by Ishii. On August 15, Hiroki and Kengo Mashimo captured the Strongest-K Tag Team Championship, defeating Kaji Tomato and Taishi Takizawa. On September 29, Hiroki defeated Tiger Shark to win the Tenryu Project International Junior Heavyweight Championship. On December 14, he dropped the title to Ryuji Hijikata. In early 2011, he teamed with Ricky Fuji in the 2011 Kaientai Dojo Tag League, finishing in Block A with 2 points and failing to advance to the next round. On October 9, after holding them for over a year, Hiroki and Mashimo lost the Strongest-K Tag Team Championship to Ryuichi Sekine and Saburo Inematsu. On November 6, he defeated Daigoro Kashiwa to capture the Independent World Junior Heavyweight Championship. Hiroki held the championship for over a year before losing it to Ricky Fuji in January 2013. On March 2, 2014, Hiroki won the Strongest-K Tag Team Championship once again, teaming with Yuji Hino to defeat Kaji Tomato and Taka Michinoku. In September 2014, he once again began competing as Hi69. In December 2016, he competed in Pro Wrestling Noah for the first time since 2005, teaming with Ricky Fuji in a loss to Daisuke Harada and Akitoshi Saito. After impressing new president Masayuki Uchida, he was offered a regular position with the promotion and began competing with them as a full-time roster member later that month. In January, he began teaming with Taiji Ishimori, dubbing themselves "XX". The duo captured the GHC Junior Heavyweight Tag Team Championship on February 18, defeating Hayata and Yo-Hey to win the vacant championship.

On July 4, Noah officially announced that Hi69 had signed with the promotion. On August 26, XX lost the GHC Junior Heavyweight Tag Team Championship to Hayata and Yo-Hey. On January 27, 2018, regained the tag team titles. However, they lost the titles once again against Yoshinari Ogawa and Minoru Tanaka on March 11, 2018. Ogawa and Tanaka vacated the titles after Ishimori announced his departure from the promotion. On April 15, 2018, Hi69 and Minoru Tanaka defeated Hayata and Yo-Hey to win the vacant GHC Junior Heavyweight Tag Team Championship. They lost the title to Hajime Ohara and Hitoshi Kumano on December 16.

On December 12, 2019, Hi69 and Junta Miyawaki lost to former partner Minoru Tanaka and Naomichi Marufuji. Two days later, Hi69 was repackaged as Nioh (仁王, Niō) and teamed with Haoh to defeat Hajime Ohara and Kinya Okada. The team has appeared in Noah on a regular basis but were unable to win the GHC junior tag team title, and they turned on each other on January 16, 2022 during a tag team match. On April 29, Haoh defeated Nioh in a "loser must change his name" match.

== Championships and accomplishments ==
- Apache Pro Wrestling

- WEW World Tag Team Championship (2 times) – with Yusuke Obata (1) and Hasegawa (1)

- Guts World Pro Wrestling

- GWC Tag Team Championship (1 time) – with Masamune

- Kaientai Dojo

- Strongest-K Championship (1 time)
- Strongest-K Tag Team Championship (2 times) – with Kengo Mashimo (1) and Yuji Hino (1)
- UWA World Tag Team Championship (1 time) – with Yasu Urano
- UWA World Middleweight Championship (1 time)
- Independent World Junior Heavyweight Championship (2 times)
- Bo-So Golden Tag Tournament (2014)

- Pro Wrestling Freedoms

- New Year Six Man Tag Tournament (2013)

- Pro Wrestling Illustrated

- Ranked No. 340 of the top 500 singles wrestlers in the PWI 500 in 2019

- Pro Wrestling Noah

- GHC Junior Heavyweight Tag Team Championship (3 times) – with Taiji Ishimori (2) and Minoru Tanaka (1)

- Tenryu Project

- Tenryu Project International Junior Heavyweight Championship (1 time)
- Tenryu Project International Junior Heavyweight Tag Team Championship (1 time) – with Masao Orihara
