= Yuki Sato (wrestler) =

Japanese professional wrestler

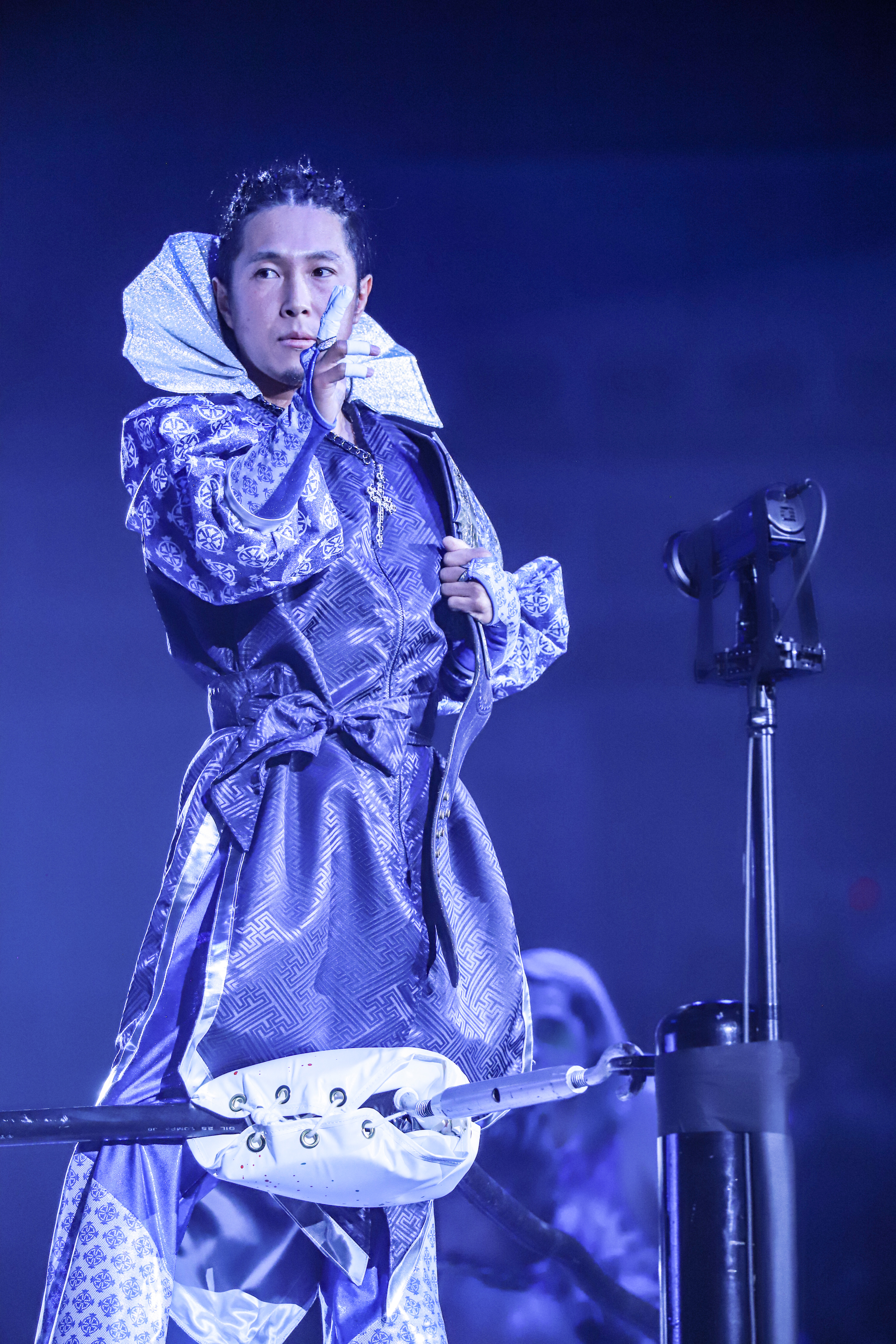
- Sato in January 2023

Personal information
- Born: November 25, 1985 (age 40) Kumamoto, Kumamoto, Japan

Professional wrestling career
- Ring name(s): Kenbai; Marines Mask; Son Goku; Yuki Sato; Yuko Sato; Haoh; Amakusa
- Billed height: 0.00 m (0 in)
- Billed weight: 0 kg (0 lb)
- Trained by: Dick Togo; Hideki Nishida
- Debut: Octobre 22, 2005

Yuki Sato (佐藤悠己, Satō Yūki; born November 25, 1985) is a Japanese professional wrestler. As of 2019, he is currently signed to Pro Wrestling Noah, where he performs under the ring name Amakusa (stylized in all caps), and is a former two time GHC Junior Heavyweight Champion. He previously wrestled in Noah as Haoh (覇王, Haō). He is best known for his time with Kaientai Dojo under his real name, and in Michinoku Pro Wrestling as Kenbai (剣舞).

As Amakusa, named after Amakusa Shirō, Sato's gimmick is that of the last remaining energy left from the Shimabara Rebellion in the Shimabara Peninsula in what is now Nagasaki Prefecture, where 37,000 Japanese Christians (Kirishitans) were killed by the Tokugawa shogunate. He had become vengeful and sought a human form, seeking to rid of the past of the conflicts during and after the rebellion. As Haoh, alongside Hiroki Tanabe, who portrayed Nioh, he is represented from Niō entrance guards in Japanese Buddhist temples. As Kenbai, he is of Iwate origin, and is inspired from a Buddhist ritualistic dance.

== Professional wrestling career ==
=== Japanese independent circuit (2005–present) ===
After training with Dick Togo and debuting in one of his Super Crew events, Sato started working as an independent wrestler and wandered around Michinoku Pro Wrestling, Dramatic Dream Team, El Dorado Wrestling, Dragon Gate, Pro Wrestling Zero1 and Kaientai Dojo, in all of them wrestling under his true name. In March 2009, he was given in Michinoku Pro the gimmick of Kenbai, a traditional onikenbai dancer. He also became a member of Big Japan Pro Wrestling's under-card.

In December 2019 he moved to Pro Wrestling Noah as Haoh, and began teaming regularly with the former Hi69, who took the name Nioh. In January 2022, however, after being unable to win the GHC Junior Heavyweight Tag Team Championship despite several shots, Haoh turned on Nioh, and on April 29 Haoh defeated Nioh in a "loser must change his name" match. On June 23, however, Haoh lost a "loser leaves town" match to Tadasuke, with which he took time off in order to return on an independent card in Tlalpan, Mexico, repackaged as Amakusa, a gimmick he kept upon returning to Japan and Noah on November 11. On December 12, Amakusa defeated Dante Leon to win the GHC Junior Heavyweight Championship for the first time, and on March 9, 2023, he successfully defended the title against his former partner Hi69.

On January 21 at Wrestle Kingdom 17 in Yokohama Arena, Amakusa challenged IWGP Junior Heavyweight Champion Hiromu Takahashi to a match. On February 21, at Keiji Muto Grand Final Pro-Wrestling "Last" Love, Amakusa was defeated by Takahashi in a Champion vs. Champion match. On April 16 at Green Journey in Sendai, Amakusa lost the GHC Heavyweight Championship to Hayata in his fourth title defense. On June 22, after pinning El Hijo de Dr. Wagner Jr. in a six-man tag team match, Amakusa challenged him to a title match for the GHC National Championship, which he failed to win on July 9.

== Championships and accomplishments ==
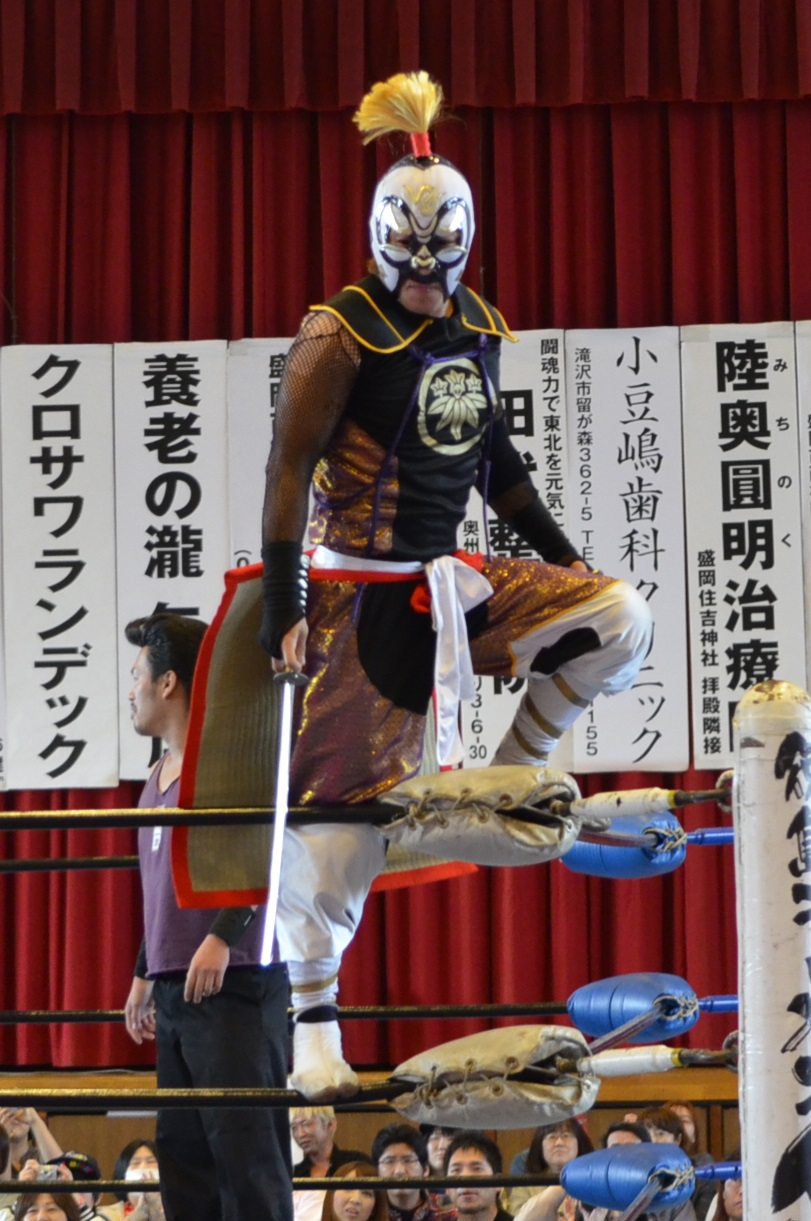
Sato as Kenbai in 2014

- 4 Front Wrestling

- 4FW Junior Heavyweight Championship (1 time)

- Dramatic Dream Team

- Ironman Heavymetalweight Championship (4 times)

- Guts World Pro-Wrestling

- GWC 6-Man Tag Team Championship (1 time) — with Dick Togo and Ryan Upin

- Ice Ribbon

- International Ribbon Tag Team Championship (1 time) – with Riho

- Kaientai Dojo

- Chiba Six Man Tag Team Championship (1 time, inaugural) – with Hiro Tonai & Shiori Asahi
- Kitakami 6-Man Tag Team Championship (1 time) – with Kengo Mashimo and Tank Nagai
- Strongest-K Tag Team Championship (3 times) – with Hiro Tonai (1), Kengo Mashimo (1) and Tank Nagai (1)
- UWA World Middleweight Championship (2 times)
- Bo-so Golden Tag Tournament (2015) – with Tank Nagai
- K-Survivor Tournament (2015) – with Kengo Mashimo, Tank Nagai and Yuma
- Tag Team Match of the Year (2015) with Kengo Mashimo vs. Kotaro Yoshino and Taishi Takizawa
- Tag Team Match of the Year (2017) with Tank Nagai vs. Kaji Tomato and Taishi Takizawa on April 23

- Michinoku Pro Wrestling

- Tohoku Tag Team Championship (1 time) – with Rasse
- Bar Mimosa Cup (2007)
- Michinoku Fairy Tale Cup (2009)

- Pro Wrestling Noah

- GHC Junior Heavyweight Championship (3 times)
- GHC Junior Heavyweight Tag Team Championship (1 time) – with Junta Miyawaki
- Global Junior Heavyweight Tag League
  - (2021) – with Tadasuke, Nioh and Aleja
  - (2025) – with Junta Miyawaki

- Pro Wrestling Illustrated
  - Ranked No. 223 of the top singles wrestlers in the PWI 500 in 2026
