= IPW:UK Junior Heavyweight Championship =

Professional wrestling championship

FightNation! Junior Heavyweight Championship

Details
- Promotion: FightNation!
- Date established: January 15, 2019
- Date retired: October 8, 2020
Statistics
- First champion: Daisuke Harada
- Final champion: Hayata
- Most reigns: Daisuke Harada (2 reigns)
- Longest reign: Daisuke Harada (268 days)
- Shortest reign: Hayata (<1 day)
- Heaviest champion: Atsushi Kotoge (200 lb)
- Lightest champion: Hayata (165 lb)

The FNW Junior Heavyweight Championship was a professional wrestling title in Japanese promotion Fight Nation Wrestling (FNW), specifically for junior heavyweight (<100 kg) workers. In addition to United Kingdom, the title has also been defended in the Japan as part of a working relationship with Pro Wrestling Noah. Traditionally the "Junior Heavyweight" term is more common in Japanese professional wrestling while in the "Cruiserweight" is a term more used in the United States or Canada.

== Tournament ==
IPW:UK held a one night 8-man tournament to crown the first champion. The event was held on January 15, 2019.

First round
Daisuke Harada
Chris Ridgeway
Kid Lykos
Hayata
Ben Basden
Yo-Hey
James Castle
Tadasuke

Semifinals
Daisuke Harada
Hayata
Ben Basden
James Castle

Finals
Daisuke Harada
James Castle

== Title history ==
Key
No.	Overall reign number
Reign	Reign number for the specific champion
Days	Number of days held
Defenses	Number of successful defenses
+	Current reign is changing daily

No.	Champion	Championship change			Reign statistics			Notes	Ref.
No.	Champion	Date	Event	Location	Reign	Days	Defenses	Notes	Ref.
1	Daisuke Harada	January 15, 2019	FNW Junior Heavyweight Championship Tournament	Milton Keynes, Buckinghamshire, England	1	244	2	Defeated James Castle in a tournament final.	
2	Atsushi Kotoge	September 16, 2019	NOAH N-1 Victory 2019 - Day 12	Osaka, Japan	1	61	0		
3	Daisuke Harada	November 16, 2019	NOAH Starting Over 2019 - Day 5	Tokyo, Japan	2	268	0		
4	Hayata	August 8, 2020	NOAH Pro Wrestling Noah 20th Anniversary NOAH The Chronicle Vol. 3	Yokohama, Japan	1	<1	0		
—		August 10, 2020	—	Yokohama, Japan			—	On the way to the locker room, Hayata tossed the championship belt into the trash can. The title was immediately declared vacated.	

== Combined reigns ==
Rank	Wrestler	No. of reigns	Combined defenses	Combined days
1	Daisuke Harada	2	2	512
2	Atsushi Kotoge	1	0	61
3	Hayata	1	0	<1

== See also ==
- IPW:UK Tag Team Championship
- IPW:UK Women's Championship
- IPW:UK World Championship
