= Global Junior Heavyweight League =

Japanese professional wrestling tournament

Jr. Grand Prix
- Promotions: Pro Wrestling Noah
- Other names: Global Junior Heavyweight League (2009–2020); Junior Rumble (2020–2022); N Innovation (2024); Jr. Grand Prix (2025–present)
- First event: 2009
- Signature matches: Singles matches

The Global Junior Heavyweight League is a professional wrestling round-robin tournament held by Pro Wrestling Noah. The purpose of the tournament is to determine the promotion's top junior heavyweight wrestler. It was originally designed to be an annual event starting in 2009, but the second tournament did not take place until 2015. The tournament is a two-block round-robin tournament, much like New Japan Pro-Wrestling's Best of the Super Juniors tournament, in which each block's two highest scorers face off in the semifinals. A victory is worth two points, a draw was worth one, and a loss zero; each match has a thirty-minute time limit. Being a professional wrestling tournament, the outcome of the matches and the tournament itself are not determined through pure athletic competition but through pre-determined outcomes to matches.

== List of winners ==
=== Global Junior Heavyweight League ===
- 2009: Yoshinobu Kanemaru
- 2015: Daisuke Harada
- 2018: Kotaro Suzuki
- 2019: Hayata
- 2020: Daisuke Harada (2)

=== Jr. Rumble ===
- 2020: Atsushi Kotoge
- 2021: Hayata (2)
- 2022: Daisuke Harada (3)

=== N Innovation ===
- 2024: Dragon Bane

=== Jr. Grand Prix ===
- 2025: Hiromu Takahashi

== 2009 ==
The first tournament, named simply Junior Heavyweight League, was held from October 15 to October 31 over nine shows, and featured two blocks of five. Foreign participation included Delirious from Ring of Honor and Jyushin Thunder Liger from New Japan Pro-Wrestling. The winner, Yoshinobu Kanemaru, also won the vacant GHC Junior Heavyweight Championship. Delirious was awarded place in the semifinal because original block A runner-up Kotaro Suzuki had to withdraw with a flu.

Final standings
Block A		Block B	
Katsuhiko Nakajima	6	Jyushin Thunder Liger	5
Kotaro Suzuki	5	Yoshinobu Kanemaru	4
Delirious	4	Atsushi Aoki	3
Kenta	3	Taiji Ishimori	2
Ricky Marvin	2	Genba Hirayanagi	0

Block A	Delirious	Katsuhiko Nakajima	Kenta	Kotaro Suzuki	Ricky Marvin
Delirious	—N/a	Nakajima (15:05)	Delirious (18:54)	Suzuki (13:52)	Delirious (14:20)
Katsuhiko Nakajima	Nakajima (15:05)	—N/a	Draw (30:00)	Draw (30:00)	Nakajima (12:07)
Kenta	Delirious (18:54)	Draw (30:00)	—N/a	Suzuki (17:28)	Kenta (1:59)
Kotaro Suzuki	Suzuki (13:52)	Draw (30:00)	Suzuki (17:28)	—N/a	Marvin (9:04)
Ricky Marvin	Delirious (14:20)	Nakajima(12:07)	Kenta (1:59)	Marvin (9:04)	—N/a
Block B	Atsushi Aoki	Genba Hirayanagi	Jyushin Thunder Liger	Taiji Ishimori	Yoshinobu Kanemaru
Atsushi Aoki	—N/a	Aoki (13:11)	Draw (30:00)	Ishimori (13:54)	Kanemaru (17:32)
Genba Hirayanagi	Aoki (13:11)	—N/a	Double countout (9:19)	Double countout (7:09)	Double countout (7:45)
Jyushin Thunder Liger	Draw (30:00)	Double countout (9:19)	—N/a	Liger (13:08)	Liger (14:45)
Taiji Ishimori	Ishimori (13:54)	Double countout (7:09)	Liger (13:08)	—N/a	Kanemaru (15:56)
Yoshinobu Kanemaru	Kanemaru (17:32)	Double countout (7:45)	Liger (14:45)	Kanemaru (15:56)	—N/a

Semifinals
A1	Katsuhiko Nakajima	Pin
B2	Yoshinobu Kanemaru	10:17
B1	Jyushin Thunder Liger	Pin
A2	Delirious	10:45

Finals
B2	Yoshinobu Kanemaru	Pin
B1	Jyushin Thunder Liger	18:53

== 2015 ==
The second tournament, now named Global Junior Heavyweight League, took place from July 18 to August 5, 2015.

Final standings
Block A		Block B	
Daisuke Harada	10	Atsushi Kotoge	8
El Desperado	8	Taiji Ishimori	8
Kenoh	8	Bengala	6
Zack Sabre Jr.	8	Hajime Ohara	6
Yoshinari Ogawa	6	Super Crazy	6
Sho Tanaka	2	Taka Michinoku	6
Hitoshi Kumano	0	Genba Hirayanagi	2

Block A	Daisuke Harada	El Desperado	Hitoshi Kumano	Kenoh	Sho Tanaka	Yoshinari Ogawa	Zack Sabre Jr.
Daisuke Harada	—N/a	Harada (5:23)	Harada (10:06)	Harada (13:29)	Harada (8:33)	Harada (11:58)	Sabre (12:12)
El Desperado	Harada (5:23)	—N/a	Desperado (7:53)	Desperado (13:31)	Desperado (10:19)	Ogawa (1:05)	Desperado (11:06)
Hitoshi Kumano	Harada (10:06)	Desperado (7:53)	—N/a	Kenoh (9:03)	Tanaka (9:01)	Ogawa (8:41)	Sabre (9:47)
Kenoh	Harada (13:29)	Desperado (13:31)	Kenoh (9:03)	—N/a	Kenoh (13:50)	Kenoh (13:28)	Kenoh (7:33)
Sho Tanaka	Harada (8:33)	Desperado (10:19)	Tanaka (9:01)	Kenoh (13:50)	—N/a	Ogawa (3:32)	Sabre (10:07)
Yoshinari Ogawa	Harada (11:58)	Ogawa (1:05)	Ogawa (8:41)	Kenoh (13:28)	Ogawa (3:32)	—N/a	Sabre (11:46)
Zack Sabre Jr.	Sabre (12:12)	Desperado (11:06)	Sabre (9:47)	Kenoh (7:33)	Sabre (10:07)	Sabre (11:46)	—N/a
Block B	Atsushi Kotoge	Bengala	Genba Hirayanagi	Hajime Ohara	Super Crazy	Taiji Ishimori	Taka Michinoku
Atsushi Kotoge	—N/a	Kotoge (8:49)	Kotoge (8:36)	Ohara (12:41)	Crazy (11:05)	Kotoge (14:58)	Kotoge (10:44)
Bengala	Kotoge (8:49)	—N/a	Hirayanagi (6:22)	Bengala (6:15)	Bengala (3:24)	Ishimori (10:48)	Bengala (7:40)
Genba Hirayanagi	Kotoge (8:36)	Hirayanagi (6:22)	—N/a	Ohara (8:29)	Crazy (5:29)	Ishimori (7:44)	Michinoku (7:33)
Hajime Ohara	Ohara (12:41)	Bengala (6:15)	Ohara (8:29)	—N/a	Crazy (10:16)	Ishimori (7:15)	Ohara (11:31)
Super Crazy	Crazy (11:05)	Bengala (3:24)	Crazy (5:29)	Crazy (10:16)	—N/a	Ishimori (12:27)	Michinoku (8:26)
Taiji Ishimori	Kotoge (14:58)	Ishimori (10:48)	Ishimori (7:44)	Ishimori (7:15)	Ishimori (12:27)	—N/a	Michinoku (9:07)
Taka Michinoku	Kotoge (10:44)	Bengala (7:40)	Michinoku (7:33)	Ohara (11:31)	Michinoku (8:26)	Michinoku (9:07)	—N/a

Final
A1	Daisuke Harada	Pin
B1	Atsushi Kotoge	16:35

== 2018 ==
The third tournament took place from September 8 to October 4, 2018.

Final standings
Block A		Block B	
Kotaro Suzuki	8	Yo-Hey	8
Daisuke Harada	6	Ikuto Hidaka	7
Hitoshi Kumano	6	Hi69	6
Tadasuke	6	Minoru Tanaka	6
Seiya Morohashi	2	Hayata	3
Hajime Ohara	2	Junta Miyawaki	0

Block A	Daisuke Harada	Hajime Ohara	Hitoshi Kumano	Kotaro Suzuki	Seiya Morohashi	Tadasuke
Daisuke Harada	—N/a	Harada (19:04)	Harada (12:06)	Suzuki (16:31)	Harada (8:47)	Tadasuke (15:31)
Hajime Ohara	Harada (19:04)	—N/a	Kumano (12:24)	Ohara (10:11)	Morohashi (10:05)	Tadasuke (6:54)
Hitoshi Kumano	Harada (12:06)	Kumano (12:24)	—N/a	Suzuki (14:33)	Kumano (11:52)	Kumano (9:59)
Kotaro Suzuki	Suzuki (16:31)	Ohara (10:11)	Suzuki (14:33)	—N/a	Suzuki (9:19)	Suzuki (10:18)
Seiya Morohashi	Harada (8:47)	Morohashi (10:05)	Kumano (11:52)	Suzuki (9:19)	—N/a	Tadasuke (9:53)
Tadasuke	Tadasuke (15:31)	Tadasuke (6:54)	Kumano (9:59)	Suzuki (10:18)	Tadasuke (9:53)	—N/a
Block B	Hayata	Hi69	Ikuto Hidaka	Junta Miyawaki	Minoru Tanaka	Yo-Hey
Hayata	—N/a	Hi69 (9:35)	Hidaka (11:11)	Hayata (4:45)	Tanaka (11:33)	Draw (12:36)
Hi69	Hi69 (9:35)	—N/a	Hidaka (14:47)	Hi69 (2:49)	Hi69 (19:41)	Yo-Hey (13:11)
Ikuto Hidaka	Hidaka (11:11)	Hidaka (14:47)	—N/a	Hidaka (8:03)	Tanaka (12:38)	Draw (30:00)
Junta Miyawaki	Hayata (4:45)	Hi69 (2:49)	Hidaka (8:03)	—N/a	Tanaka (5:55)	Yo-Hey (8:02)
Minoru Tanaka	Tanaka (11:33)	Hi69 (19:41)	Tanaka (12:38)	Tanaka (5:55)	—N/a	Yo-Hey (14:57)
Yo-Hey	Draw (12:36)	Yo-Hey (13:11)	Draw (30:00)	Yo-Hey (8:02)	Yo-Hey (14:57)	—N/a

Final
A1	Kotaro Suzuki	Pin
B1	Yo-Hey	17:00

== 2019 ==
The fourth Global Junior Heavyweight League took place from June 27 to July 27, 2019.

Current standings
Block A		Block B	
Tadasuke	8	Hayata	7
Yo-Hey	6	Kotaro Suzuki	7
Yoshinari Ogawa	6	Chris Ridgeway	6
Daisuke Harada	5	Hajime Ohara	4
Minoru Tanaka	5	Hi69	4
Junta Miyawaki	0	Hitoshi Kumano	2

Block A	Daisuke Harada	Junta Miyawaki	Minoru Tanaka	Tadasuke	Yo-Hey	Yoshinari Ogawa
Daisuke Harada	—N/a	Harada (6:52)	Draw (30:00)	Tadasuke (15:01)	Harada (15:20)	Ogawa (9:47)
Junta Miyawaki	Harada (6:52)	—N/a	Tanaka (8:43)	Tadasuke (8:57)	Yo-Hey (8:57)	Ogawa (9:54)
Minoru Tanaka	Draw (30:00)	Tanaka (8:43)	—N/a	Tadasuke (10:14)	Yo-Hey (12:40)	Tanaka (11:33)
Tadasuke	Tadasuke (15:01)	Tadasuke (8:57)	Tadasuke (10:14)	—N/a	Tadasuke (10:41)	Ogawa (13:19)
Yo-Hey	Harada (15:20)	Yo-Hey (8:57)	Yo-Hey (12:40)	Tadasuke (10:41)	—N/a	Yo-Hey (14:14)
Yoshinari Ogawa	Ogawa (9:47)	Ogawa (9:54)	Tanaka (11:33)	Ogawa (13:19)	Yo-Hey (14:14)	—N/a
Block B	Chris Ridgeway	Hajime Ohara	Hayata	Hi69	Hitoshi Kumano	Kotaro Suzuki
Chris Ridgeway	—N/a	Ohara (9:20)	Hayata (14:30)	Ridgeway (13:08)	Ridgeway (10:01)	Ridgeway (8:38)
Hajime Ohara	Ohara (9:20)	—N/a	Hayata (15:59)	Ohara (10:20)	Kumano (13:35)	Suzuki (10:09)
Hayata	Hayata (14:30)	Hayata (15:59)	—N/a	Hi69 (11:27)	Hayata (11:01)	Draw (30:00)
Hi69	Ridgeway (13:08)	Ohara (10:20)	Hi69 (11:27)	—N/a	Hi69 (9:39)	Suzuki (8:59)
Hitoshi Kumano	Ridgeway (10:01)	Kumano (13:35)	Hayata (11:01)	Hi69 (9:39)	—N/a	Suzuki (10:32)
Kotaro Suzuki	Ridgeway (8:38)	Suzuki (10:09)	Draw (30:00)	Suzuki (8:59)	Suzuki (10:32)	—N/a

Block B Decision			Final
			A1	Tadasuke	Pin
B1	Hayata	Pin	B1	Hayata	19:12
B2	Kotaro Suzuki	3:13

== 2020 ==
The 2020 Global Junior Heavyweight League, featuring 4 blocks took place between January 10 and January 30.

Final standings
Block A		Block B		Block C		Block D	
Yoshinari Ogawa	4	Dick Togo	4	Hajime Ohara	4	Daisuke Harada	4
Hayata	2	Kotaro Suzuki	4	Atsushi Kotoge	4	Minoru Tanaka	3
Nosawa Rongai	2	Tadasuke	2	Yo-Hey	2	Nio	3
Junta Miyawaki	0	Hao	2	Hitoshi Kumano	2	Chris Ridgeway	2

Block A	Hayata	Yoshinari Ogawa	Nosawa Rongai	Junta Miyawaki
Hayata	—N/a	Ogawa (18:33)	Double; Countout (6:43)	Hayata (9:48)
Yoshinari Ogawa	Ogawa (18:33)	—N/a	Double; Countout (10:29)	Ogawa (8:08)
Nosawa Rongai	Double; Countout (6:43)	Double; Countout (10:29)	—N/a	Nosawa (9:23)
Junta Miyawaki	Hayata (9:48)	Ogawa (8:08)	Nosawa (9:23)	—N/a
Block B	Kotaro Suzuki	Tadasuke	Hao	Dick Togo
Kotaro Suzuki	—N/a	Suzuki (7:39)	Suzuki (9:20)	Togo (15:09)
Tadasuke	Suzuki (7:39)	—N/a	Tadasuke (7:49)	Tadasuke (12:46)
Hao	Suzuki (9:20)	Tadasuke (7:49)	—N/a	Togo (9:21)
Dick Togo	Togo (15:09)	Tadasuke (12:46)	Togo (9:21)	—N/a
Block C	Atsushi Kotoge	Yo-Hey	Hajime Ohara	Hitoshi Kumano
Atsushi Kotoge	—N/a	Kotoge (15:41)	Ohara (14:20)	Kotoge (10:56)
Yo-Hey	Kotoge (15:41)	—N/a	Ohara (13:49)	Yo-Hey (13:53)
Hajime Ohara	Ohara (14:20)	Ohara (13:49)	—N/a	Kumano (13:39)
Hitoshi Kumano	Kotoge (10:56)	Yo-Hey (13:53)	Kumano (13:39)	—N/a
Block D	Daisuke Harada	Chris Ridgeway	Minoru Tanaka	Nio
Daisuke Harada	—N/a	Harada (10:56)	Draw (30:00)	Draw (30:00)
Chris Ridgeway	Harada (10:56)	—N/a	Tanaka (11:34)	Ridgeway (13:39)
Minoru Tanaka	Draw (30:00)	Tanaka (11:34)	—N/a	Nio (14:24)
Nio	Draw (30:00)	Ridgeway (13:39)	Nio (14:24)	—N/a

Semifinals
A1	Yoshinari Ogawa	Sub
B1	Dick Togo	8:31
C1	Hajime Ohara	Pin
D1	Daisuke Harada	15:45

Finals
B1	Dick Togo	Pin
D1	Daisuke Harada	19:43

=== 2020 (Rumble) ===
After the COVID-19 pandemic, the Junior Heavyweight League was replaced with an annual Junior Rumble. The first edition was on 4 October as part of an N-1 Victory 2020 show at Korakuen Hall in Bunkyō, Tokyo and contained 14 participants. They entered strictly every 30 seconds. The winner of this rumble did not receive a GHC Junior Heavyweight Championship shot and the reigning champion, Kotaro Suzuki, participated.

Entry	Wrestler	Unit	Order	Eliminated by	Method	Time of elimination
1	Daisuke Harada	Momo no Seishun	11/12	Hayata	Over The Top Rope	22:00
2	Yo-Hey	Full Throttle	11/12	Hayata	Over The Top Rope	22:00
3	Tadasuke	Kongo	7	Nioh	Over The Top Rope	16:22
4	Hayata	Stinger	13	Atsushi Kotoge	Pinfall	24:32
5	Nosawa Rongai	Sugiura-gun	5	Atsushi Kotoge	Pinfall	14:59
6	Junta Miyawaki	Momo no Seishun	6	Tadasuke	Pinfall	15:33
7	Yoshinari Ogawa	Stinger	1	Himself	Abandoned the match.	5:49
8	Seiki Yoshioka	Full Throttle	4	Nosawa Rongai	Pinfall	12:59
9	Kaz Hayashi	Sugiura-gun	3	Seiki Yoshioka	Over The Top Rope	12:35
10	Haoh	Kongo	9	Hayata	Pinfall	18:18
11	Nioh	Kongo	10	Daisuke Harada	Pinfall	19:47
12	Hajime Ohara	Full Throttle	2	Kaz Hayashi	Pinfall	12:14
13	Kotaro Suzuki	Stinger	8	Haoh	Pinfall	17:29
14	Atsushi Kotoge	Momo no Seishun	-	WINNER	-	-
Winner:	Atsushi Kotoge					

== 2021 ==
The 2021 Noah Junior Rumble was held in an empty Club Citta, Kawasaki, Kanagawa on 26 June, one month before the Noah Jr. Team Game 2021. It was part of Noah Cage War 2021. The Rumble had 15 participants, 1 more than the previous year. The winner, Hayata, defeated Atsushi Kotoge for the GHC Junior Heavyweight Championship the next night.

Haoh, Tadasuke and Nioh all entered at the same time. Hayata & Yoshinari Ogawa entered unofficially and were allowed entry by the referee.

Entry	Wrestler	Unit	Order	Eliminated by	Method	Time of elimination
1	Daisuke Harada	Seiki gun / Momo no Seishun	2	Hayata	Over The Top Rope	17:26
2	Nosawa Rongai	Los Perros del Mal de Japón	1	Yoshinari Ogawa	Over The Top Rope	17:26
3	Eita	Los Perros del Mal de Japón	8	Yoshinari Ogawa	Over The Top Rope	23:55
4	Seiki Yoshioka	Stinger	11	Yo-Hey	Over The Top Rope	25:25
5	Junta Miyawaki	Seiki-gun	7	Eita	Pinfall	23:13
6	Yo-Hey	Los Perros del Mal de Japón	14	Hayata	Pinfall	35:00
7-9	Haoh	Kongo	4	Junta Miyawaki	Pinfall	21:11
7-9	Tadasuke	Kongo	10	Seiki Yoshioka	Pinfall	24:51
7-9	Nioh	Kongo	5	Junta Miyawaki	Over The Top Rope	21:41
10	Hajime Ohara	Seiki-gun	3	Haoh	Pinfall	20:26
11	Yuya Susumu	Stinger	9	Tadasuke	Pinfall	24:20
12	Ikuto Hidaka	Los Perros del Mal de Japón	6	Yuya Susumu	Pinfall	22:26
13	Kotaro Suzuki	Los Perros del Mal de Japón	13	Hayata	Pinfall	26:52
14-15	Hayata	Stinger	-	WINNER	-	-
14-15	Yoshinari Ogawa	Stinger	12	Kotaro Suzuki, Nosawa Rongai & Yo-Hey	Over The Top Rope	26:01
Winner:	Hayata (2)					

== 2022 ==
The 2022 Noah Junior Rumble was part of the N Innovation U-Cup. It was held at Yokohama Radiant Hall, Yokohama on 6 January. Daisuke Harada defeated Hayata for the GHC Junior Heavyweight Championship the next night.

Entry	Wrestler	Unit	Order	Eliminated by	Method	Time of elimination
1	Atsushi Kotoge	Seiki-gun	9	Yo-Hey	Pinfall	16:49
2	Alejandro	Kongo	6	Hajime Ohara	Pinfall	14:54
3	Yuya Susumu	Stinger	4	Atsushi Kotoge	Pinfall	11:13
4	Yo-Hey	Los Perros del Mal de Japón	12	Seiki Yoshioka	Over The Top Rope	20:00
5	Seiki Yoshioka	Stinger	13	Kotaro Suzuki	Pinfall	20:20
6	Tadasuke	Kongo	5	Junta Miyawaki	Over The Top Rope	11:59
7	Junta Miyawaki	Seiki-gun	8	Haoh	Pinfall	16:20
8	Nosawa Rongai	Los Perros del Mal de Japón	2	Yoshinari Ogawa	Over The Top Rope	6:51
9	Yoshinari Ogawa	Stinger	3	Nosawa Rongai	Over The Top Rope	7:42
10	Eita	Los Perros del Mal de Japón	1	Nosawa Rongai	Over The Top Rope	6:49
11	Daisuke Harada	Seiki-gun	-	WINNER	-	-
12	Kotaro Suzuki	Los Perros del Mal de Japón	14	Daisuke Harada	Pinfall	24:30
13	Haoh	Kongo	11	Daisuke Harada	Over The Top Rope	18:18
14	Nioh	Kongo	7	Junta Miyawaki	Pinfall	14:59
15	Hajime Ohara	Seiki-gun	10	Seiki Yoshioka	Pinfall	17:33
Winner:	Daisuke Harada (3)					

== 2024 ==
The 2024 edition of the tournament premiered under the "N Innovation" banner and took place between October 30 and November 6.

Round 1
Dragon Bane	Pin
Kai Fujimura	13:11
Yu Owada	6:37
Yuto Kikuchi	Pin
Amakusa	Pin
Tadasuke	8:44
Yo-Hey	13:55
Junta Miyawaki	Pin

Semifinals
Dragon Bane	Pin
Yuto Kikuchi	11:22
Amakusa	3:18
Junta Miyawaki	Pin

Final
Dragon Bane	Pin
Junta Miyawaki	16:20

== 2025 ==
The 2025 edition of the tournament premiered under the "Jr. Grand Prix" banner and took take place between November 8 and 21.

Round 1
Hiromu Takahashi	Pin
Daiki Odashima	12:56
Ninja Mack	Pin
Alejandro	8:29
Daga	9:31
Tadasuke	Pin
Amakusa	Pin
Jun Masaoka	10:31
Yuto Kikuchi	11:14
Hayata	Sub
Hajime Ohara	10:24
Eita	Pin
Kai Fujimura	Pin
Junta Miyawaki	6:53
Black Menso-re	0:57
Shuji Kondo	Pin

Quarterfinals
Hiromu Takahashi	Pin
Ninja Mack	10:50
Tadasuke	Pin
Amakusa	14:38
Hayata	Pin
Eita	14:35
Kai Fujimura	Pin
Shuji Kondo	12:57

Semifinals
Hiromu Takahashi	Pin
Tadasuke	10:11
Hayata	8:38
Kai Fujimura	Pin

Final
Hiromu Takahashi	Pin
Kai Fujimura	14:26

== 2026 ==
The 2026 edition of the tournament and will take place between November 9 and 28.

Round 1
Kai Fujimura	13:44
Bushi	Pin
Hiroya Namiki	9:30
Alejandro	Pin
Shuji Kondo	Pin
Yo-Hey	12:13
Sidney Akeem	Pin
Kid Lykos	9:30
Kid Lykos II	11:44
Tsunagu Sato	Pin
Daiki Odashima	Pin
Jun Masaoka	15:54
Tadasuke	Pin
Hi69	9:13
Black Menso-re	9:56
Dragon Bane	Pin

Quarterfinals
Bushi	11:34
Alejandro	Pin

Semifinals
Bushi

Final
