= Atsushi Kotoge =

Japanese professional wrestler

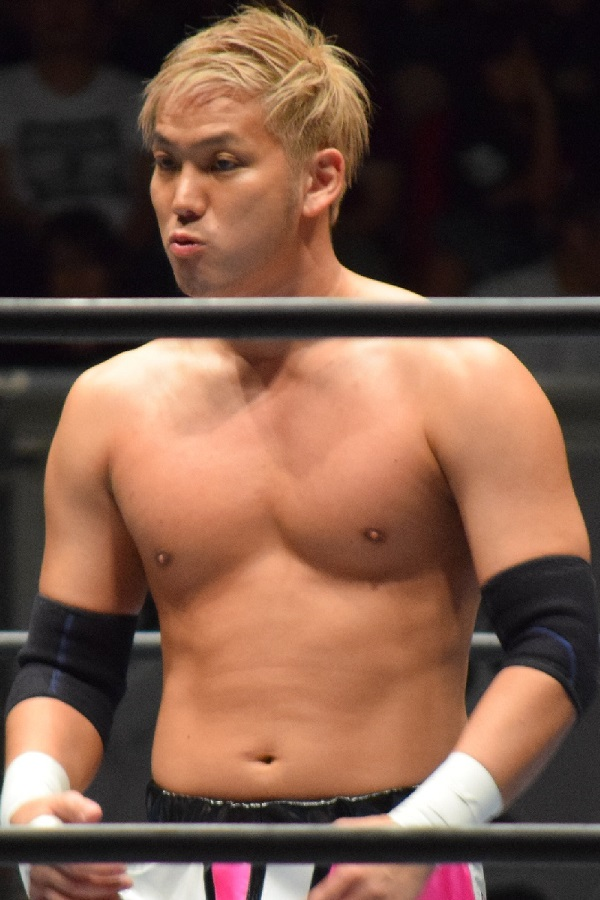
- Kotoge in September 2016

Personal information
- Born: October 18, 1985 (age 41) Kaizuka, Osaka

Professional wrestling career
- Ring name(s): Atsunosuke Matsuyama; Atsushi Kotoge; Atsushi-kun; Kaiju no Kobun; Kototaro
- Billed height: 1.77 m (5 ft 9 1/2 in)
- Billed weight: 83 kg (183 lb)
- Trained by: Osaka Pro Wrestling dojo
- Debut: April 29, 2005

Atsushi Kotoge (小峠 篤司, Kotōge Atsushi) (born October 18, 1985) is a Japanese professional wrestler, currently signed to Pro Wrestling Noah, where he is a former one-time GHC Tag Team Champion, three-time GHC Junior Heavyweight Champion and record eleven-time GHC Junior Heavyweight Tag Team Champion. He is also known for his time in Osaka Pro Wrestling, where he was part of the tag team Momo no Seishun Tag (桃の青春タッグ, Momo no Seishun Taggu; "Peach of Youth Tag") with Daisuke Harada. Kotoge and Harada are former three-time Osaka Pro Wrestling Tag Team Champions and have also worked together for various other promotions across Japan and for Philadelphia, Pennsylvania–based Chikara in the United States.

== Professional wrestling career ==
=== Osaka Pro Wrestling (2005–2012) ===
Kotoge made his debut for Osaka Pro Wrestling on April 29, 2005, at the promotion's sixth anniversary show, facing Kabuto Beetle in a losing effort. After a rocky first year, which saw Kotoge feuding with La Uchida, without much success, the summer of 2006 saw him starting a new feud with Daisuke Harada, during which he also began picking up victories and showing improvement in his in–ring work. In November 2006, Kotoge and Harada ended their feud and decided to partner up instead. After working as a tag team for over a year, Kotoge and Harada were finally granted a shot at the Osaka Pro Wrestling Tag Team Championship on January 5, 2008, but were unsuccessful in their attempt at dethroning the defending champions Bad Force (Gaina and Zero). Just a month later on February 11, the team came to an abrupt end, when Kotoge turned heel and joined the Bad Force stable, which, beside Gaina and Zero, also included Condor, Hideyoshi, Kazushi and Masamune. Meanwhile, Harada formed rival group Blood & Guts with Zeus and Tadasuke. The feud between Bad Force and Blood & Guts would last for the next three months, before Bad Force was dissolved, when Condor, Gaina and Zero jumped to splinter promotion Okinawa Pro Wrestling, after which Kotoge reunited with Harada by joining his stable. In June, Blood & Guts sent two teams into the 2008 Osaka Tag Festival, with Kotoge teaming with Tadasuke and Harada with Zeus. Both teams made it to the finals, where Harada and Zeus were victorious. Kotoge spent the rest of the year teaming with Harada and on November 15, the two unsuccessfully challenged Black Buffalo and Tigers Mask for the Osaka Pro Wrestling Tag Team Championship.

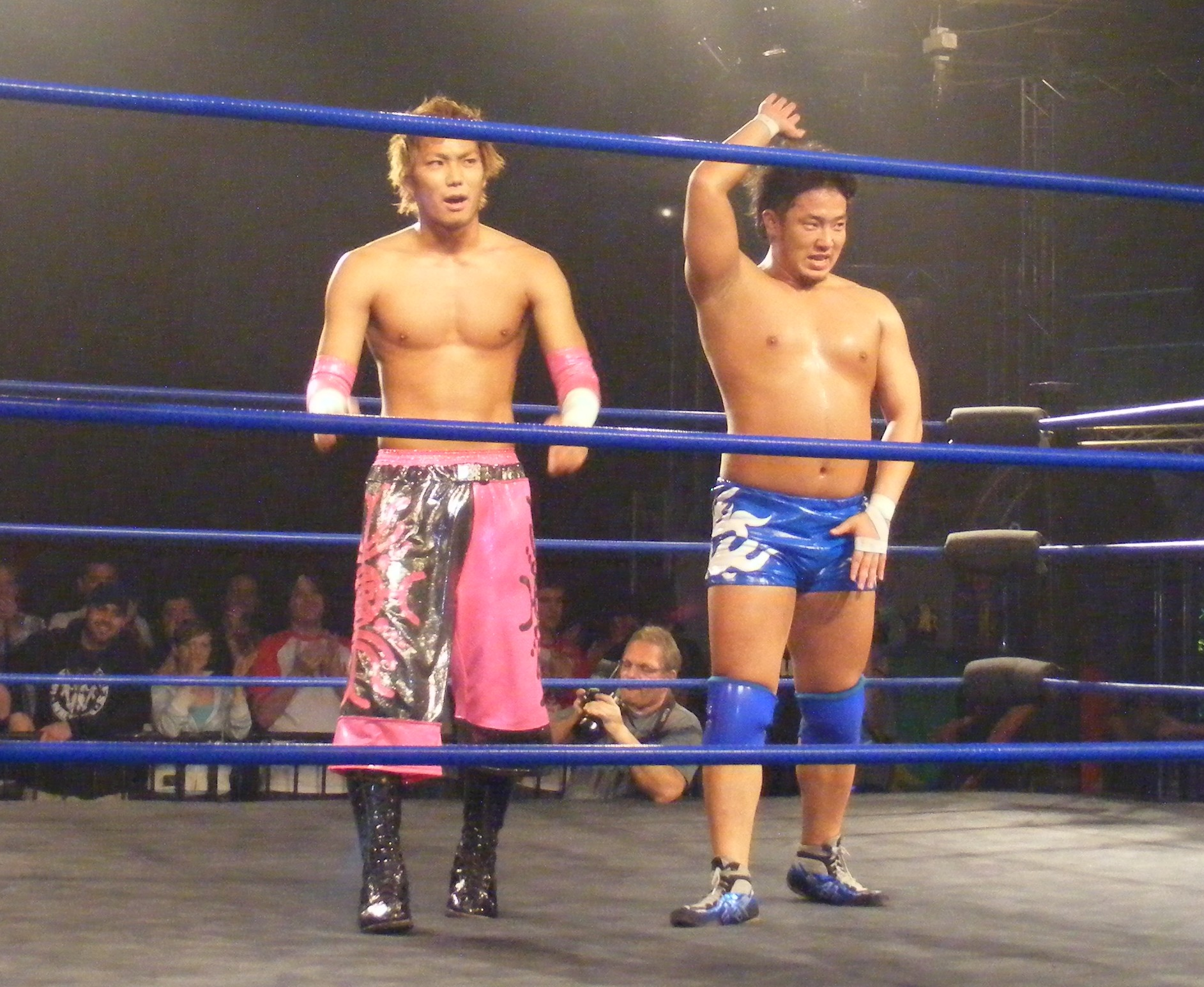
Momo no Seishun Tag in April 2010

In March 2009, Kotoge entered the Indie Junior Challenger Determination tournament, defeating tag team partner Daisuke Harada in his first round match. The finals of the tournament on April 4 was a three-way match between stablemates Kotoge, Harada and Tadasuke, with Harada once again being victorious. On June 6, 2009, Tadasuke, considered the lowest ranking member of Blood & Guts, turned on the stable and joined rival group LOV (Legion of Violence). The turn built to a Hair vs. Hair match on July 25, where Kotoge was defeated by Tadasuke. With Zeus out of Osaka Pro, Kotoge and Harada disbanded the Blood & Guts stable, renamed their tag team Momo no Seishun Tag and concentrated on chasing the Osaka Pro Wrestling Tag Team Championship. On January 16, 2010, Kotoge and Harada defeated Orochi and Tadasuke to become the number one contenders to the Osaka Pro Wrestling Tag Team Championship and finally, on February 11, defeated Hideyoshi and Masamune to win the Tag Team Championship for the first time. On May 9, Kotoge and Harada teamed with Takoyakida to defeat Tokyo Gurentai (Fujita, Mazada and Nosawa Rongai) for the UWA World Trios Championship. They would hold the Trios Championship for a month, before losing it to Ebessan, Kanjyouro Matsuyama and Kuishinbo Kamen. On July 17, Momo no Seishun Tag lost the Osaka Pro Wrestling Tag Team Championship to Don Fujii and Masaaki Mochizuki, representing rival promotion Dragon Gate.

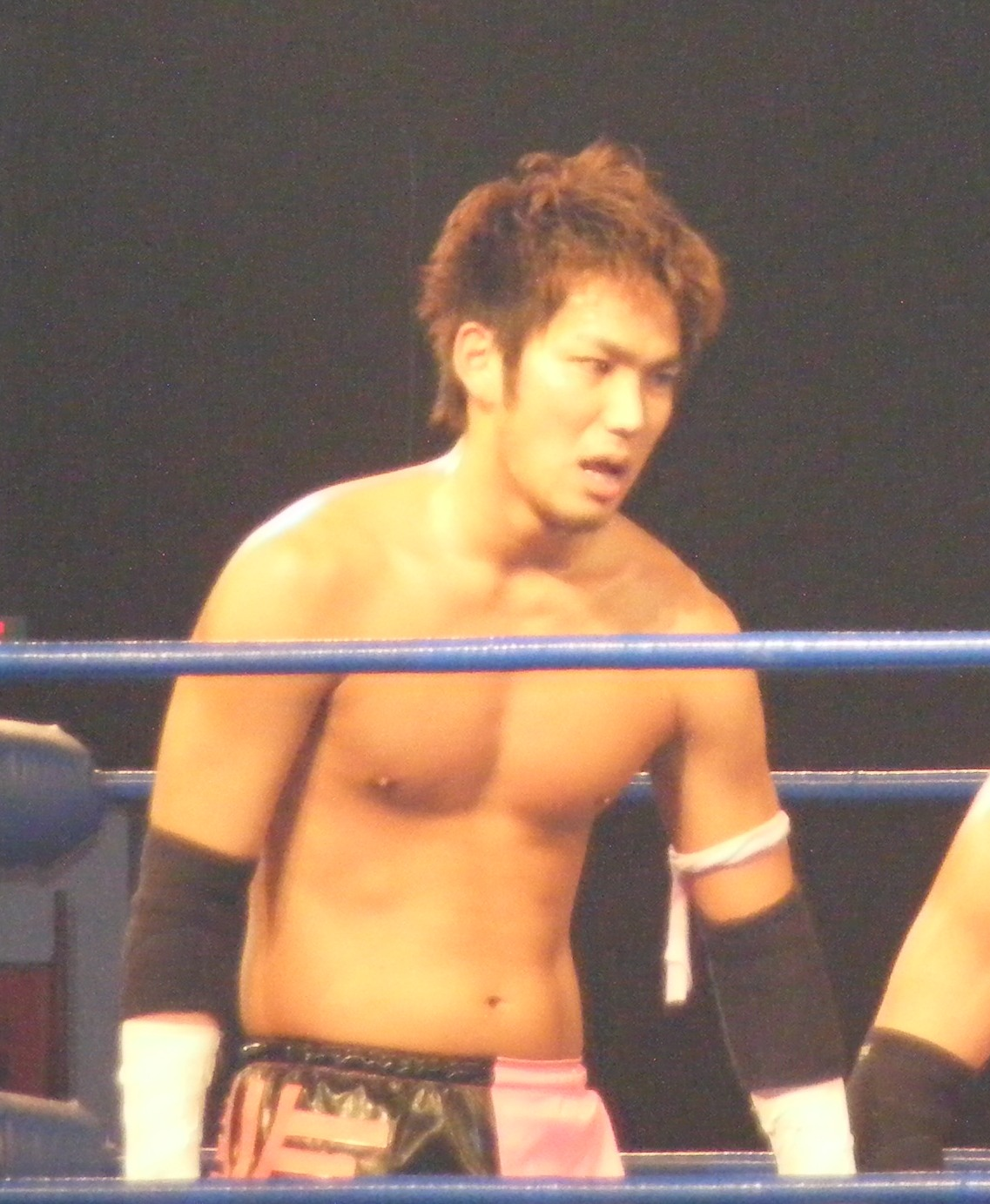
Kotoge in April 2011

On October 15, 2010, Kotoge and Harada made their debuts for Pro Wrestling Noah to take part in the 2010 Nippon TV Jr. Heavyweight Tag League. After one victory and three losses, Kotoge and Harada finished last in their block. Upon their return to Osaka Pro, Momo no Seishun Tag defeated Fujii and Mochizuki on October 31 to regain the Osaka Pro Wrestling Tag Team Championship. Their second reign would last less than two months as they lost the title to Joker (Kuuga and Orochi) on November 28. On January 15, 2011, Kotoge and Harada returned to Noah to unsuccessfully challenge Atsushi Aoki and Naomichi Marufuji for the GHC Junior Heavyweight Tag Team Championship. On March 6, Momo no Seishun Tag wrestled Joker representatives Orochi and Tadasuke to a draw in an Osaka Pro Wrestling Tag Team Championship number one contenders' match and afterwards agreed to a three-way match for the title. The title match took place on March 19, when Orochi and Tadasuke defeated Momo no Seishun Tag and previous champions, Big Guns (Zeus and The Bodyguard) to become the new Osaka Pro Wrestling Tag Team Champions. On April 21 Momo no Seishun Tag returned to Noah, where they defeated GHC Junior Heavyweight Champion Kotaro Suzuki and Shane Haste in a tag team match. On July 18 Momo no Seishun Tag defeated the teams of Joker (Orochi and Tadasuke) and Takoyakida and Ultimate Spider Jr. in a three-way match to win the Osaka Pro Wrestling Tag Team Championship for the third time. Four days later Kotoge and Harada returned to Pro Wrestling Noah to take part in the 2011 NTV G+ Cup Junior Heavyweight Tag League. After two victories and two losses, Kotoge and Harada finished third in their block, missing the finals of the tournament. On October 30, Momo no Seishun Tag lost the Osaka Pro Wrestling Tag Team Championship to the Joker team of Hayata and Kuuga. On November 27, the members of Momo no Seishun Tag faced off in the first round of the 2011 Tenno-zan tournament, with Harada eliminating Kotoge and advancing to the second round, eventually going on to win the entire tournament. On December 18, Momo no Seishun Tag returned to Pro Wrestling Noah, where they teamed with Shane Haste to defeat Atsushi Aoki, Kotaro Suzuki and Taiji Ishimori in a six-man tag team match, afterwards challenging Aoki and Suzuki to a match for the GHC Junior Heavyweight Tag Team Championship. On January 22, 2012, Momo no Seishun Tag failed to capture the GHC Junior Heavyweight Tag Team Championship from Aoki and Suzuki. On April 7, Kotoge announced that he would be leaving Osaka Pro at the end of the month. Momo no Seishun Tag wrestled their final match together on April 21, when they battled Hideyoshi and Masamune to a thirty-minute draw. On April 29, Kotoge, Daisuke Harada and Tadasuke defeated Billyken Kid, Black Buffalo and Tigers Mask in Kotoge's final Osaka Pro match. Following the match, Kotoge announced Pro Wrestling Noah as his new home promotion.

=== Chikara (2010–2011) ===
In April 2010, Kotoge along with Harada and their former Blood & Guts partner Tadasuke traveled to the United States to represent Osaka Pro in Chikara's 2010 King of Trios tournament. In their first round match in the tournament on April 23, Team Osaka Pro defeated The UnStable (Colin Delaney, Stigma and Vin Gerard). While Kotoge and Harada worked the tour as faces, Tadasuke worked as a heel, and in the following day's quarterfinal match, used his heel antics to eliminate the reigning King of Trios, F.I.S.T. (Chuck Taylor, Gran Akuma and Icarus), from the tournament by pinning Taylor, while holding his tights, thus sending Team Osaka Pro to the semifinals of the tournament. On April 25, Team Osaka Pro was eliminated from the tournament in the semifinals by The Colony (Fire Ant, Green Ant and Soldier Ant). Despite failing to win the tournament, Team Osaka Pro's strong showing had made them instant crowd favorites in Chikara.

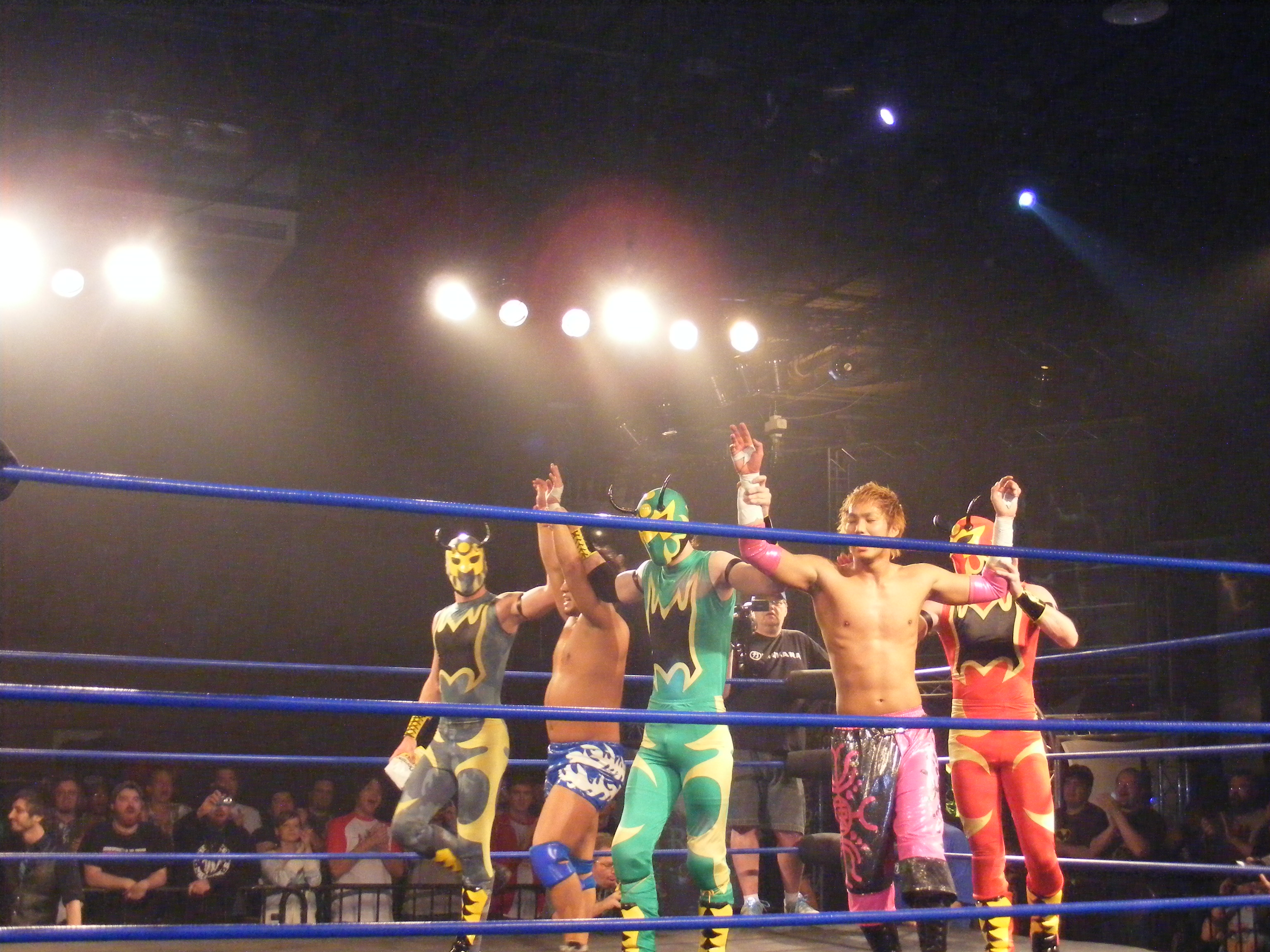
Kotoge and Harada posing with The Colony, after their match in the 2010 King of Trios

On March 1, 2011, Chikara announced that Kotoge and Harada would be returning to the promotion for the 2011 King of Trios, this time teaming with the reigning Osaka Pro Wrestling Battle Royal Champion Ultimate Spider Jr. On April 15, Team Osaka Pro defeated the Throwbacks (Dasher Hatfield, Matt Classic and Sugar Dunkerton) in their first round match. However, the following day, Team Osaka Pro was eliminated from the tournament by F.I.S.T. (Chuck Taylor, Icarus and Johnny Gargano), when Taylor pinned Spider Jr., while grabbing a hold of his tights, much like how Tadasuke had pinned him in the tournament the previous year. On April 17, the final day of the tournament, Kotoge and Harada entered a ten tag team gauntlet match. They entered the match as the eighth team, facing the Roughnecks (Brodie Lee and Grizzly Redwood), whom they eliminated when Kotoge pinned Redwood. After Kotoge also scored the pinfall, which eliminated team number nine, 3.0 (Scott Parker and Shane Matthews), he and Harada faced off with representatives from rival promotion Dragon Gate, Kagetora and Super Shisa. In the end, Kotoge was able to score his third pinfall of the day, winning the match for Momo no Seishun Tag, while also earning the team their third point, which guaranteed them a shot at the Campeonatos de Parejas, which was at the time held by Jigsaw and Mike Quackenbush. On August 25, Chikara announced that Momo no Seishun Tag would return to cash their points on October 7, challenging brand new Campeones de Parejas, F.I.S.T. (Chuck Taylor and Johnny Gargano), in a rubber match. On October 7 in Burlington, North Carolina, Momo no Seishun Tag failed to capture the Campeonatos de Parejas as they were defeated by Taylor and Gargano two falls to one, following interference from Icarus. The following day, Kotoge and Harada were defeated by Fire Ant and Soldier Ant at a show in Kingsport, Tennessee.

=== Pro Wrestling Noah ===
==== Junior heavyweight (2012–2016) ====
On May 1, 2012, Kotoge appeared at a press conference, where he was officially presented as Pro Wrestling Noah's newest signee. Kotoge wrestled his first match under a Noah contract on May 6, when he was defeated by Go Shiozaki. On May 13, Kotoge pinned GHC Junior Heavyweight Champion Yoshinobu Kanemaru in a tag team main event, where he teamed with GHC Heavyweight Champion Takeshi Morishima and Kanemaru with Maybach Taniguchi. The following day, Kotoge was named the number one contender to Kanemaru's title. Kotoge received his title shot on June 3, but was defeated by Kanemaru. On July 22, Kotoge wrestled one of the biggest matches of his career, when he was defeated by DDT Pro-Wrestling representative Kota Ibushi in a singles match. After losing to Muhammad Yone on July 29, Kotoge was accepted into the Brave stable, which in addition to Yone also included leader Naomichi Marufuji, Ricky Marvin, Takashi Sugiura, Takeshi Morishima and Taiji Ishimori, who agreed to team with Kotoge in the upcoming 2012 NTV G+ Cup Junior Heavyweight Tag League. On August 9, Kotoge wrestled another big match, where he was defeated by the recently returned Kenta. At the end of the two-week-long NTV G+ Cup Junior Heavyweight Tag League, Kotoge and Ishimori won their round-robin block with three wins and one loss, advancing to the finals, where, on September 22, they defeated Daichi Hashimoto and Ikuto Hidaka to win the tournament and become the number one contenders to the GHC Junior Heavyweight Tag Team Championship. Kotoge and Ishimori received their title shot on October 8, but were defeated by the defending champions, Ricky Marvin and Super Crazy. On December 16, Kotoge made a special return to Osaka Pro, teaming with Ishimori, Billyken Kid, Tigers Mask and Tsubasa in a ten-man tag team match, where they defeated the Joker team of Hideyoshi, Masamune, Orochi, Quiet Storm and Spider J, with Kotoge pinning Spider J for the win. On January 27, 2013, Kotoge represented Noah in an interpromotional match with New Japan Pro-Wrestling (NJPW), teaming with Yoshinari Ogawa in a tag team match, where they were defeated by Jyushin Thunder Liger and Tiger Mask. On March 10, Kotoge received another shot at the GHC Junior Heavyweight Championship, but was defeated by the defending champion, Taiji Ishimori. In April, Kotoge got to take part in his first Global Tag League, when he replaced an injured Naomichi Marufuji and became Takashi Sugiura's new partner for the tournament. While the tournament was still ongoing, Kotoge and Ishimori received another shot at the GHC Junior Heavyweight Tag Team Championship on April 21, but were defeated by the defending champions, Genba Hirayanagi and Suwa. Kotoge and Sugiura finished the Global Tag League on April 28 with a record of two wins and two losses. Despite failing to make the finals, they were awarded the Technique award.

On May 12, Kotoge wrestled in a singles match, where he defeated former tag team partner Daisuke Harada, who had just joined Noah from Osaka Pro. From July 11 to 28, Kotoge and Ishimori took part in the 2013 NTV G+ Cup Junior Heavyweight Tag League, contested for the vacant GHC Junior Heavyweight Tag Team Championship, where they made it all the way to the finals, before losing to Jyushin Thunder Liger and Tiger Mask. On August 24, Kotoge returned to the ring with Daisuke Harada, when he was pinned by his former partner in a tag team match, where he and Ishimori faced Harada and Hitoshi Kumano. After Harada and Kumano had failed to win the GHC Junior Heavyweight Tag Team Championship from Liger and Tiger Mask, Kotoge and Ishimori received another shot at the title on October 5, but were again defeated by the NJPW representatives. Kotoge and Ishimori finally won the title on March 21, 2014, when they defeated Yoshinari Ogawa and Zack Sabre Jr. Afterwards, Kotoge announced he was planning on becoming a double junior heavyweight champion, challenging GHC Junior Heavyweight Champion, former partner Daisuke Harada. Kotoge and Ishimori's reign as GHC Junior Heavyweight Tag Team Champions lasted only 22 days, before they lost the title back to Ogawa and Sabre in their first defense on April 12. On April 19, Kotoge also failed in his attempt to capture the GHC Junior Heavyweight Championship from Harada. On July 5, Kotoge and Ishimori regained the GHC Junior Heavyweight Tag Team Championship from Ogawa and Sabre. They lost the title to Hajime Ohara and Kenoh on October 12.

On December 6, Kotoge won his first singles title, when he defeated former partner Daisuke Harada for the GHC Junior Heavyweight Championship. He made his first successful title defense in a rematch with Harada on January 24, 2015. He lost the title to Taichi in his second defense on March 15, following repeated outside interference from Taichi's Suzuki-gun stablemates El Desperado and Taka Michinoku. Kotoge received a rematch for the title on May 10, but was again defeated following outside interference from El Desperado and a steel chair shot from Taichi. On May 24, Kotoge represented Noah in Lucha Libre AAA Worldwide's Lucha Libre World Cup in Mexico City. Team Noah, made up of Kotoge, Taiji Ishimori and Yoshihiro Takayama was defeated in the first round of the tournament by the Dream Team (Myzteziz, El Patrón Alberto and Rey Mysterio Jr.). Back in Noah, Kotoge made it to the finals of the 2015 Global Junior Heavyweight League, but was defeated there on August 5 by Daisuke Harada. On August 22, Kotoge and Harada announced they were reuniting for the 2015 NTV G+ Cup Junior Heavyweight Tag League, which would mark their first matches together as a tag team in four years. On September 22, Kotoge and Harada finished their round-robin block in the tournament with a record of three wins and one loss, winning their block and advancing to the finals. Later that same day, they defeated the reigning GHC Junior Heavyweight Tag Team Champions El Desperado and Taka Michinoku in the finals to win the tournament. This led to a match on October 4, where Kotoge and Harada defeated El Desperado and Taka Michinoku to win the GHC Junior Heavyweight Tag Team Championship, becoming the first Noah wrestlers to reclaim one of the four GHC titles from the Suzuki-gun stable. Afterwards, Kotoge and Harada continued feuding with Suzuki-gun by successfully defending their title against members of the stable; first defeating El Desperado and Michinoku in a rematch on December 23, then defeating Taichi and Michinoku on January 31, 2016, and finally defeating Taichi and Yoshinobu Kanemaru on February 19. On March 19, Kotoge and Harada lost the title to Hajime Ohara and Kenoh. Kotoge and Harada regained the title in a rematch on April 5. They then went back to defending the title against Suzuki-gun, defeating El Desperado and Taka Michinoku for their first successful defense on April 30, before defeating Ohara and Kenoh in a title rematch on May 28. On June 12, Kotoge and Harada won a three-way match, defeating the Suzuki-gun team of Michinoku and Taichi as well as Gedo and Jado, to make their third successful title defense. The following month, Kotoge and Harada made it to the finals of the 2016 NTV G+ Cup Junior Heavyweight Tag League, but were defeated there by A. C. H. and Taiji Ishimori. This led to a title match on August 21 at a NJPW show, where Kotoge and Harada defeated ACH and Ishimori for their fourth successful title defense, afterwards nominating Gedo and Jado as their next challengers.

On September 23, Kotoge defeated Yoshinobu Kanemaru to win the GHC Junior Heavyweight Championship for the second time. On October 8, Kotoge and Harada lost the GHC Junior Heavyweight Tag Team Championship to Gedo and Jado. Kotoge made his first successful defense of the GHC Junior Heavyweight Championship on October 23, defeating Kanemaru in a rematch. On November 22, Kotoge made his second successful title defense against his tag team partner Daisuke Harada. On December 2, Kotoge defeated Taichi for his third successful title defense. On December 24, Kotoge and Harada regained the GHC Junior Heavyweight Tag Team Championship from Gedo and Jado. Following the win, Kotoge stated he wanted to join the heavyweight division in 2017. On December 26, Noah held a press conference to officially announce Kotoge's transition into the heavyweight division, resulting in him relinquishing both the GHC Junior Heavyweight and GHC Junior Heavyweight Tag Team Championships.

==== Heavyweight (2017–2019) ====
Kotoge's heavyweight debut took place on January 7, 2017, when he and Naomichi Marufuji unsuccessfully challenged Go Shiozaki and Maybach Taniguchi for the GHC Tag Team Championship. The following day, Kotoge defeated Rionne Fujiwara for his first win as a heavyweight. Momo no Seishun Tag formally disbanded on February 14, after Kotoge defeated Harada in a singles match. In May, Kotoge and Go Shiozaki advanced to the finals of the 2017 Global Tag League, after finishing their block with a record of five wins and two losses. On May 4, they were defeated in the finals of the tournament by reigning GHC Tag Team Champions Maybach Taniguchi and Naomichi Marufuji. On June 4, Kotoge defeated Kenoh to become the number one contender to the GHC Heavyweight Championship. Kotoge received his title shot on June 25, but was defeated by Katsuhiko Nakajima.

On August 26, Kotoge won his first title as a heavyweight, when he and Go Shiozaki defeated Maybach Taniguchi and Naomichi Marufuji for the GHC Tag Team Championship. They lost the title to Muhammad Yone and Quiet Storm on October 1. On March 11, he teamed with Naomichi Marufuji to defeat Akitoshi Saito and Shiro Koshinaka and later that night challenged Takashi Sugiura, who had just defeated Kenoh for the GHC Heavyweight Championship, to a title match, then busted him open with a headbutt. During the Global Tag League in April, he managed to pin the champion in a tournament match. Kotoge received his title match on April 29, but was defeated by Sugiura.

==== Return to Junior heavyweight (since 2019) ====
In 2019, Kotoge joined Stinger and started feuding with Daisuke Harada and his Ratel's stable. Kotoge challenged Daisuke Harada for IPW Junior Heavyweight Championship when Harada defeated Chris Ridgeway. At 16 September Kotoge defeated Harada making him IPW UK Junior Heavyweight Champion for 1st time in his career.

== Personal life ==
Kotoge got married in August 2017.

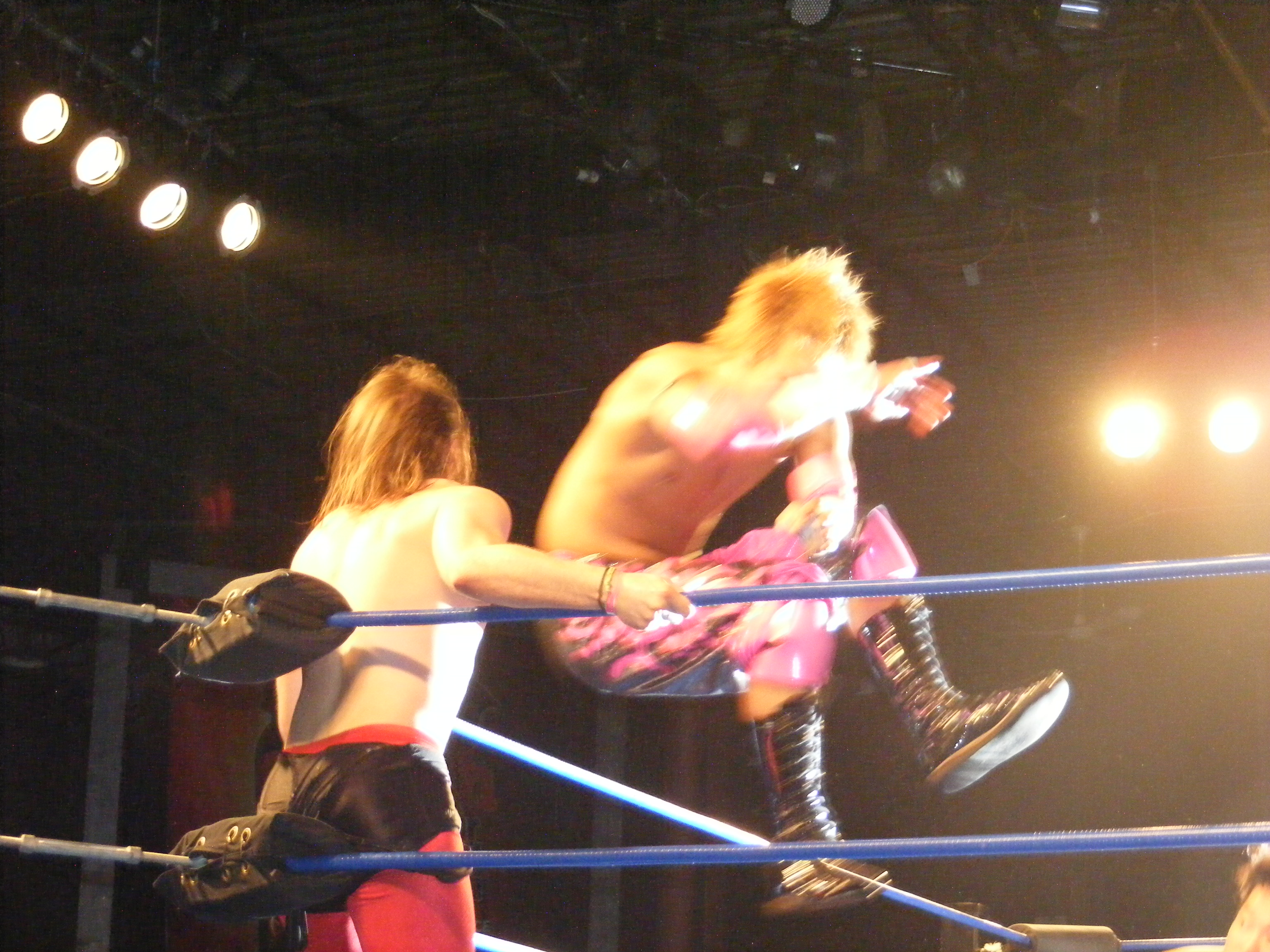
Kotoge charging on Colin Delaney

== Championships and accomplishments ==
- Dragon Gate
  - Open the Triangle Gate Championship (1 time) – with Daisuke Harada and Yo-Hey
- Gleat
  - G-Rex Championship (1 time, current)
- International Pro Wrestling: United Kingdom
  - IPW:UK Junior Heavyweight Championship (1 time)
- Osaka Pro Wrestling
  - Osaka Pro Wrestling Tag Team Championship (3 times) – with Daisuke Harada
  - UWA World Trios Championship (1 time) – with Daisuke Harada and Takoyakida
- Pro Wrestling Illustrated
  - Ranked No. 165 of the top 500 singles wrestlers in the PWI 500 in 2022
- Pro Wrestling Noah
  - GHC Junior Heavyweight Championship (3 times)
  - GHC Junior Heavyweight Tag Team Championship (11 times) – with Taiji Ishimori (2), Daisuke Harada (4), Kotaro Suzuki (1), Hajime Ohara (1), Yo-Hey (1) and Seiki Yoshioka (2)
  - GHC Tag Team Championship (1 time) – with Go Shiozaki
  - NTV G+ Cup Junior Heavyweight Tag League (2012) – with Taiji Ishimori
  - NTV G+ Cup Junior Heavyweight Tag League (2015) – with Daisuke Harada
  - Tsukigi Seikotsuin Cup (2014)
  - Global Tag League Technique Award (2013) – with Takashi Sugiura

== Luchas de Apuestas record ==
Winner (wager)	Loser (wager)	Location	Event	Date	Notes
Tadasuke (hair)	Atsushi Kotoge (hair)	Osaka, Japan	Saturday Night Story	July 25, 2009	
