= Daisuke Harada =

Japanese professional wrestler

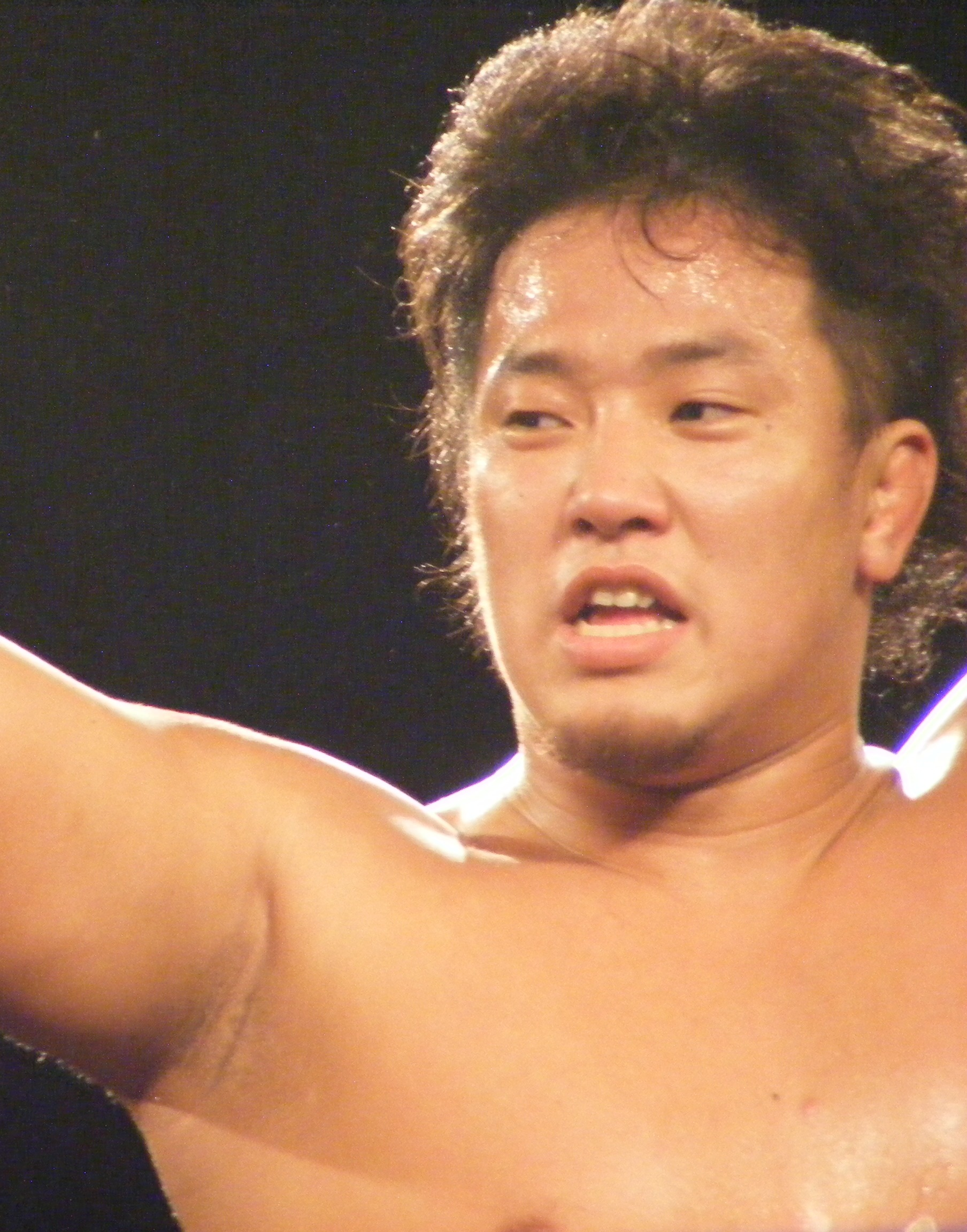
- Harada in April 2010

Personal information
- Born: November 13, 1986 (age 39) Suita, Osaka, Japan

Professional wrestling career
- Ring name(s): Dainosuke Matsuyama; Daisuke Araki; Daisuke Harada; Harada-kun; Haradan Cougar; Hayata
- Billed height: 1.69 m (5 ft 6 1/2 in)
- Billed weight: 80 kg (176 lb)
- Trained by: Osaka Pro Wrestling dojo Tigers Mask
- Debut: August 5, 2006
- Retired: March 9, 2023

Daisuke Harada (原田 大輔, Harada Daisuke) (born November 13, 1986) is a Japanese retired professional wrestler, currently signed to Pro Wrestling Noah. He is a five-time GHC Junior Heavyweight Champion and a six-time GHC Junior Heavyweight Tag Team Champion.

Harada is also known for his time in Osaka Pro Wrestling, where he was a two-time Osaka Pro Wrestling Champion and a two-time Osaka Pro Wrestling Tag Team Champion as part of the tag team Momo no Seishun Tag (桃の青春タッグ, Momo no Seishun Taggu; "Peach of Youth Tag") with Atsushi Kotoge. Harada and Kotoge also worked together for various other promotions across Japan, Philadelphia, Pennsylvania–based Chikara in the United States and currently in Noah, where they are 4-time GHC Junior Heavyweight Tag Team Champions.

Nicknamed 'Young Master', Harada is also the only two-time winner of Noah's Global Junior Heavyweight League (winning in 2015 and 2020), winner of the 2022 edition of the Jr. Rumble and is ranked second for all-time defenses of the GHC Junior Heavyweight Championship, with 16.

== Early life ==
Harada reportedly first got interested in professional wrestling through the video game Toukon Ratsuden, after which his first in–person professional wrestling experience was attending the January 4, 1998, Final Power Hall in Tokyo Dome show, witnessing the conclusion of Riki Choshu's retirement tour. Harada began competing in amateur wrestling in his high school and ended up winning Osaka Prefecture's amateur wrestling championship at 60 kg (130 lb). Afterwards, he began training in professional wrestling at Osaka Pro Wrestling's school.

== Professional wrestling career ==
=== Osaka Pro Wrestling (2006–2013) ===
Harada made his debut for Osaka Pro Wrestling on August 5, 2006, facing Atsushi Kotoge in a losing effort. He would spend his first months in the promotion feuding with Kotoge, before forming a tag team with him in November. During the partnership, in May 2007, Harada defeated Kotoge in a tournament final to win the Kamigata Pro–Wrestling Newcomer Grand Prix. After working as a tag team for over a year, Harada and Kotoge were finally granted a shot at the Osaka Pro Wrestling Tag Team Championship on January 5, 2008, but were unsuccessful in their attempt at dethroning the defending champions, Bad Force (Gaina and Zero). Just a month later on February 11, the team came to an abrupt end, when Kotoge turned heel and joined Bad Force. Meanwhile, Harada formed a new partnership with Zeus, creating rival stable Blood & Guts, which was intended to highlight the promotion's younger performers. In March, Harada and Zeus accepted Tadasuke as the third member of the group. In May, Bad Force was dissolved, when the majority of its members jumped to splinter promotion Okinawa Pro Wrestling, after which Harada's former partner Atsushi Kotoge jumped to Blood & Guts. In June, Blood & Guts sent two teams into the 2008 Osaka Tag Festival, with Harada teaming with Zeus and Kotoge with Tadasuke. Both teams made it to the finals, where Harada and Zeus were victorious, after Harada pinned Kotoge with the Katayama German Suplex Hold. As a result, Harada and Zeus were granted a shot at the Osaka Pro Wrestling Tag Team Championship on September 6, but were defeated by the defending champions, GAINA and Zero. The rest of the year, Harada spent mostly tagging with Kotoge and on November 15 the two received a shot at the Osaka Pro Wrestling Tag Team Championship, but were once again unsuccessful in defeating the defending champions, Black Buffalo and Tigers Mask.

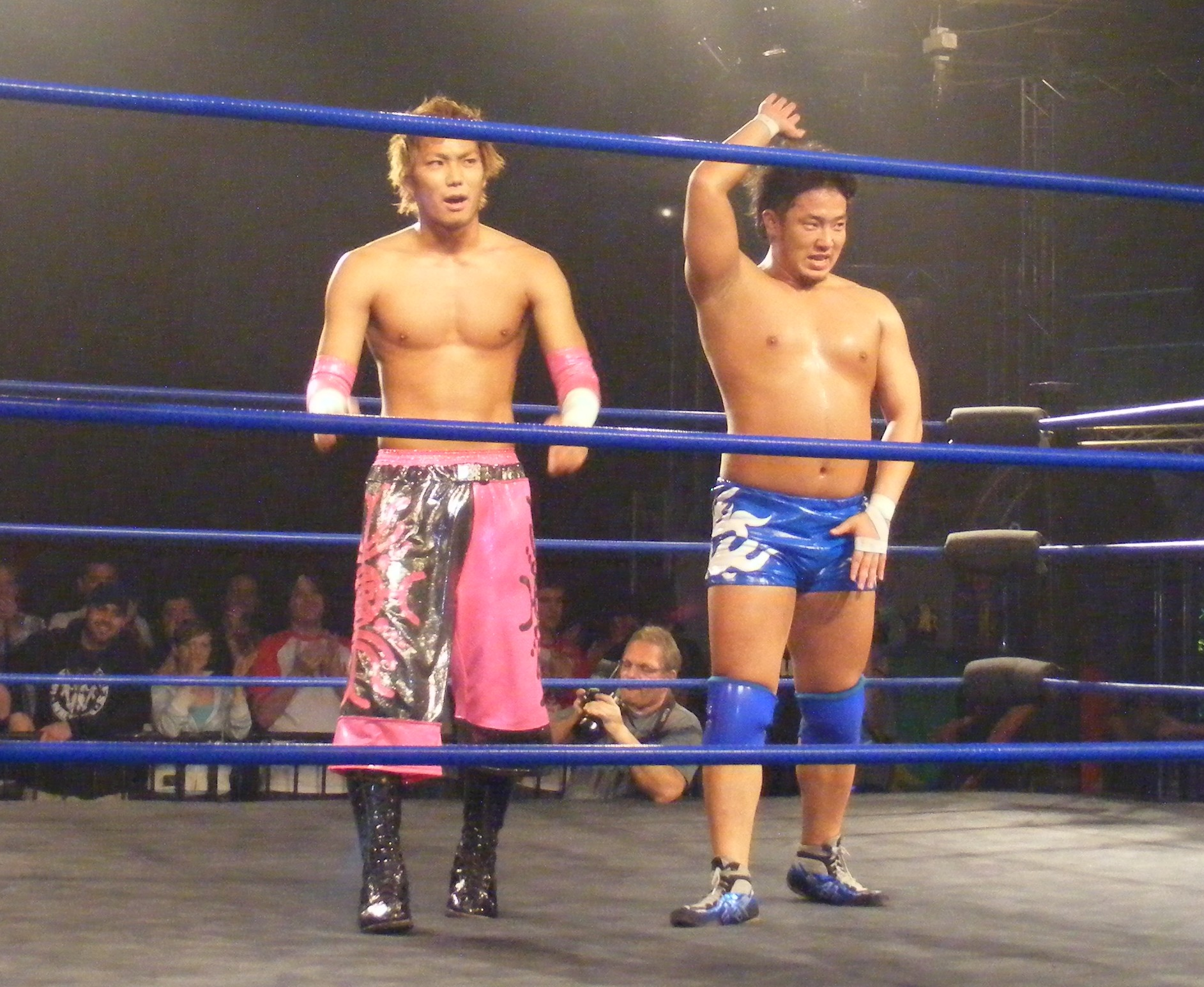
Momo no Seishun Tag in April 2010

In March 2009, Harada, Kotoge and Tadasuke were entered in the Indie Junior Challenger Determination round-robin tournament, and after each of them finished with a record of 1–1, the winner was decided in a three–way final match on April 4. In the end Harada pinned Tadasuke to win the tournament. As a result, Harada was granted a shot at the Independent World Junior Heavyweight Championship, but was defeated by Makoto Oishi on April 29. On June 6, 2009, Tadasuke, considered the lowest ranking member of Blood & Guts, turned on the stable and joined rival group LOV (Legion of Violence). Shortly afterwards, Zeus left Osaka Pro, after which Harada and Kotoge disbanded the Blood & Guts stable, renamed their tag team Momo no Seishun Tag and concentrated on chasing the Osaka Pro Wrestling Tag Team Championship. On January 16, 2010, Harada and Kotoge defeated Orochi and Tadasuke to become the number one contenders to the Osaka Pro Wrestling Tag Team Championship and finally, on February 11, defeated Hideyoshi and Masamune to win the Tag Team Championship for the first time. On April 17, Harada defeated Tadasuke in a tournament final to become the number one contender to the Osaka Pro Wrestling Championship. He would, however, fail in his attempt to win the title from Billyken Kid on April 29 at Osaka Pro's eleventh anniversary show. On May 9, Harada and Kotoge teamed with Takoyakida to defeat Tokyo Gurentai (Fujita, Mazada and Nosawa Rongai) for the UWA World Trios Championship. They would hold the Trios Championship for a month, before losing it to Ebessan, Kanjyuro Matsuyama and Kuishinbo Kamen. On July 17, Momo no Seishun Tag lost the Osaka Pro Wrestling Tag Team Championship to Don Fujii and Masaaki Mochizuki, representing rival promotion Dragon Gate.

On September 16, 2010, Harada made his debut for New Japan Pro-Wrestling (NJPW), losing to Hirooki Goto at NEVER.2. On October 15, Harada made his debut for another major promotion, Pro Wrestling Noah, when he and Kotoge entered the 2010 Nippon TV Jr. Heavyweight Tag League. After one victory and three losses, Momo no Seishun Tag finished last in their block. Upon their return to Osaka Pro, Momo no Seishun Tag defeated Fujii and Mochizuki on October 31 to regain the Osaka Pro Wrestling Tag Team Championship. Their second reign would last less than two months as they lost the title to Joker (Kuuga and Orochi) on November 28. On January 15, 2011, Harada and Kotoge returned to Noah to unsuccessfully challenge Atsushi Aoki and Naomichi Marufuji for the GHC Junior Heavyweight Tag Team Championship. On March 6, Harada and Kotoge wrestled Joker representatives Orochi and Tadasuke to a draw in an Osaka Pro Wrestling Tag Team Championship number one contenders' match and afterwards agreed to a three–way match for the title. The title match took place on March 19, when Orochi and Tadasuke defeated Momo no Seishun Tag and previous champions, Big Guns (Zeus and The Bodyguard) to become the new Osaka Pro Wrestling Tag Team Champions. On April 21 Momo no Seishun Tag returned to Noah, where they defeated GHC Junior Heavyweight Champion Kotaro Suzuki and Shane Haste in a tag team match. On July 18 Momo no Seishun Tag defeated the teams of Joker (Orochi and Tadasuke) and Takoyakida and Ultimate Spider Jr. in a three–way match to win the Osaka Pro Wrestling Tag Team Championship for the third time. Four days later Harada and Kotoge returned to Pro Wrestling Noah to take part in the 2011 Nippon TV Jr. Heavyweight Tag League. After two victories and two losses, Harada and Kotoge finished third in their block, missing the finals of the tournament. On October 30, Momo no Seishun Tag lost the Osaka Pro Wrestling Tag Team Championship to the Joker team of Hayata and Kuuga. On November 27, Harada entered Osaka Pro's annual Tenno-zan tournament, defeating tag team partner Atsushi Kotoge in his first round match. On December 18, Harada defeated Kuuga to win the 2011 Tenno-zan, avenging his loss in the previous year's finals in the process. Later that same day, Momo no Seishun Tag returned to Pro Wrestling Noah, where they teamed with Shane Haste to defeat Atsushi Aoki, Kotaro Suzuki and Taiji Ishimori in a six-man tag team match, afterwards challenging Aoki and Suzuki to a match for the GHC Junior Heavyweight Tag Team Championship. On January 22, 2012, Momo no Seishun Tag failed to capture the GHC Junior Heavyweight Tag Team Championship from Aoki and Suzuki. On January 28, Harada defeated Masamune to become the number one contender to the Osaka Pro Wrestling Championship. On February 26, Harada defeated Billyken Kid to win the Osaka Pro Wrestling Championship for the first time. On March 25, Harada lost the title to Black Buffalo in his first title defense, ending his reign at 28 days, the shortest in the title's history. On April 29, Momo no Seishun Tag was officially disbanded, when Kotoge left Osaka Pro Wrestling to join Pro Wrestling Noah full-time. On May 26, Harada defeated Tadasuke in the finals of a tournament to earn a rematch for the Osaka Pro Wrestling Championship. On July 7, Harada formed a new partnership with Tadasuke and Hayata, who had recently turned on Joker and were now looking to stop their former stable. On July 14, the new alliance was named "Glare". On July 22, Harada defeated Black Buffalo in the main event of Osaka Pro's largest annual event, Hurricane, to regain the Osaka Pro Wrestling Championship, completing a clean sweep for Glare as earlier in the event Hayata and Tadasuke became the new Osaka Pro Wrestling Tag Team Champions. On September 30, Harada made his first successful defense of the Osaka Pro Wrestling Championship against Joker's newest member Quiet Storm. On October 21, Glare won the Osaka Pro Wrestling 6 Person Tag Tournament, defeating the Joker trio of Hideyoshi, Kuuga and Quiet Storm in the finals. In early December, Harada defeated Billyken Kid, Kengo Takai, and finally stablemate Hayata to advance to the finals of the 2012 Tenno-zan tournament. On December 16, Harada defeated Hub in the finals to win his second Tenno-zan in a row. On January 19, 2013, Glare defeated Black Buffalo, Kazuaki Mihara and Naoki Setoguchi in a six-man tag team main event. After the match, Harada revealed Buffalo as the newest member of Glare. On February 24, Harada, Buffalo, Hayata and Tadasuke of Glare faced Billyken Kid, Kazuaki Mihara, Naoki Setoguchi and Tigers Mask of the Osaka Pro Seikigun in an elimination match, where the losing team would be forced to disband. The match eventually came down to Harada and Billyken Kid and ended with Harada scoring the deciding pinfall, saving Glare and forcing Seikigun to disband. On March 2, Billyken Kid and Kazuaki Mihara joined Glare, announcing they now agreed with the stable's "revolution". Glare then declared war on Joker and Unique Gundan, the two remaining stables in Osaka Pro. The rivalry between Glare and Unique Gundan built to a four-on-four elimination match on March 24, where Harada, Hayata, Mihara and Tadasuke suffered an upset defeat at the hands of Ebessan, Kanjyuro Matsuyama, Kuishinbo Kamen and Takoyakida, with Ebessan scoring the last elimination over Harada. Afterwards, the two groups made peace with each other. On March 30, six top Osaka Pro wrestlers, including Harada and stablemate Hayata, announced that they were quitting the promotion. Harada announced that he was not going to re-sign with the promotion once his contract ran out on April 29, revealing that he was looking for a wrestling future in Tokyo. The announcement also led to him relinquishing the Osaka Pro Wrestling Championship. On April 29, Harada wrestled his final Osaka Pro match, where he, Hayata, Kazuaki Mihara and Tadasuke were defeated by Hideyoshi, Kuuga, Masamune and Orochi. After the match, Harada revealed that he was following his former partner Atsushi Kotoge to Pro Wrestling Noah.

=== Chikara (2010–2011) ===
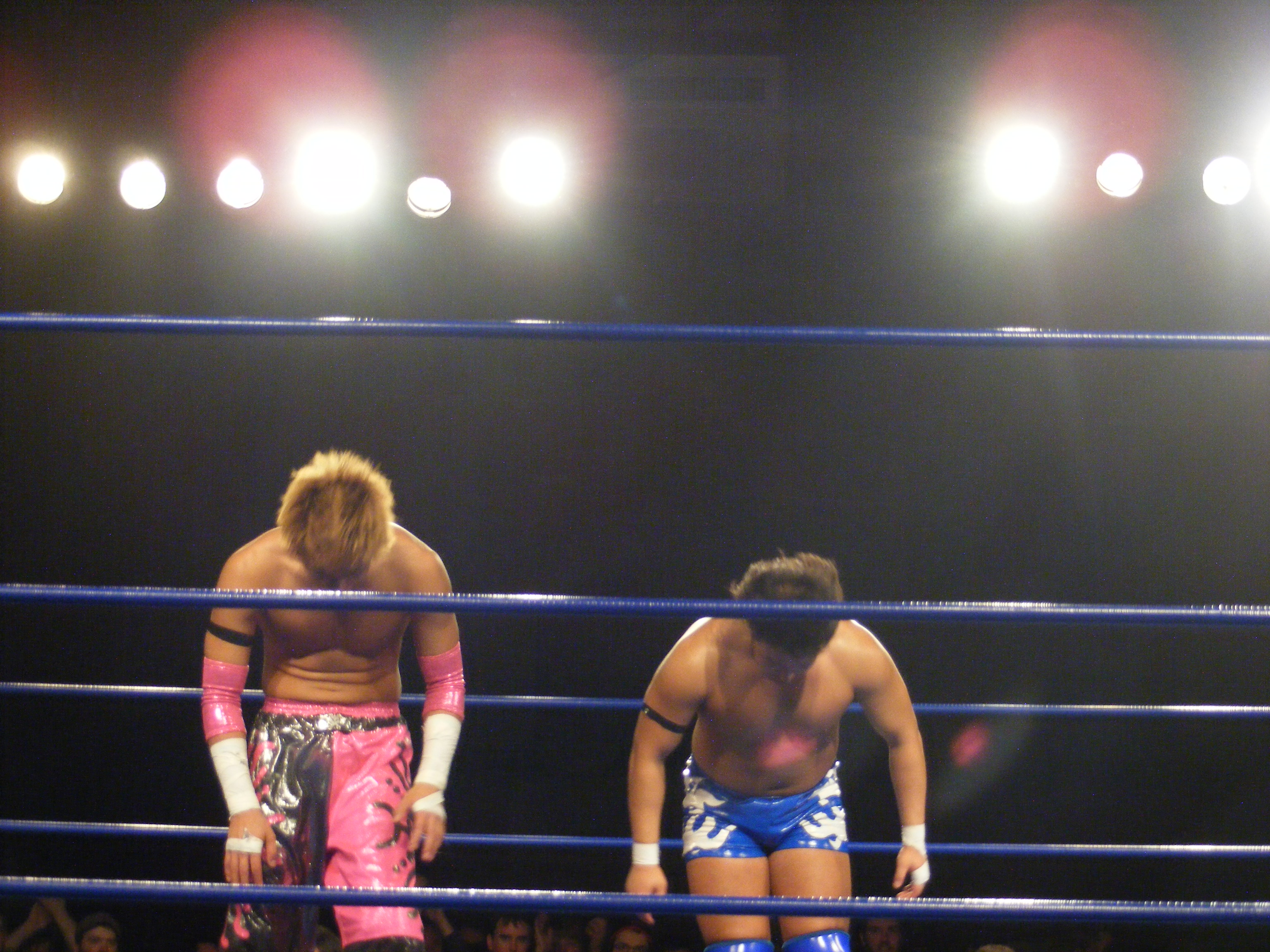
Harada and Kotoge thanking the crowd, after their first round match in the 2010 King of Trios

In April 2010, Harada along with Kotoge and their former Blood & Guts partner Tadasuke traveled to the United States to represent Osaka Pro in Chikara's 2010 King of Trios tournament. In their first round match in the tournament on April 23, Team Osaka Pro defeated The UnStable (Colin Delaney, Stigma and Vin Gerard), when Harada pinned Delaney with the Katayama German Suplex Hold. While Harada and Kotoge worked the tour as faces, Tadasuke worked as a heel, and in the following day's quarterfinal match, used his heel antics to eliminate the reigning King of Trios, F.I.S.T. (Chuck Taylor, Gran Akuma and Icarus), from the tournament by pinning Taylor, while holding his tights, thus sending Team Osaka Pro to the semifinals of the tournament. On April 25, Team Osaka Pro was eliminated from the tournament in the semifinals by The Colony (Fire Ant, Green Ant and Soldier Ant). Despite failing to win the tournament, Team Osaka Pro's strong showing had made them instant crowd favorites in Chikara.

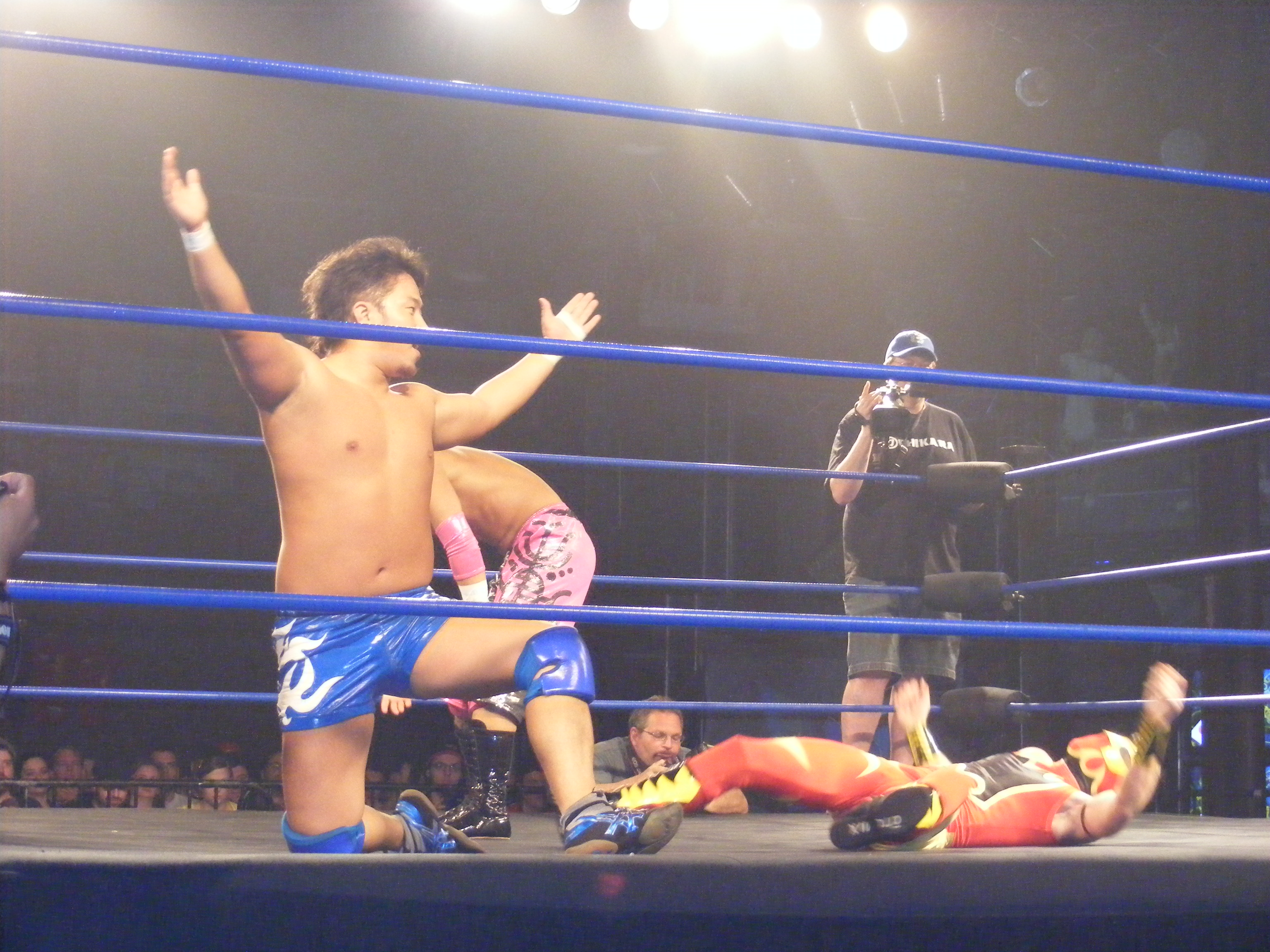
Harada posing over Fire Ant in April 2010

On March 1, 2011, Chikara announced that Harada and Kotoge would be returning to the promotion for the 2011 King of Trios, this time teaming with the reigning Osaka Pro Wrestling Battle Royal Champion Ultimate Spider Jr. On April 15, Team Osaka Pro defeated the Throwbacks (Dasher Hatfield, Matt Classic and Sugar Dunkerton) in their first round match. However, the following day, Team Osaka Pro was eliminated from the tournament by F.I.S.T. (Chuck Taylor, Icarus and Johnny Gargano), when Taylor pinned Spider Jr., while grabbing a hold of his tights, much like how Tadasuke had pinned him in the tournament the previous year. On April 17, the final day of the tournament, Harada and Kotoge entered a ten tag team gauntlet match. They entered the match as the eighth team, facing the Roughnecks (Brodie Lee and Grizzly Redwood), whom they eliminated when Kotoge pinned Redwood. After also eliminating team number nine, 3.0 (Scott Parker and Shane Matthews), Harada and Kotoge faced off with representatives from rival promotion Dragon Gate, Kagetora and Super Shisa. In the end, Kotoge was able to score the deciding pinfall, earning Momo no Seishun Tag the victory and their third point, which guaranteed them a shot at the Campeonatos de Parejas, which was at the time held by Jigsaw and Mike Quackenbush. On August 25, Chikara announced that Momo no Seishun Tag would return to cash their points on October 7, challenging brand new Campeones de Parejas, F.I.S.T. (Chuck Taylor and Johnny Gargano), in a rubber match. On October 7 in Burlington, North Carolina, Momo no Seishun Tag failed to capture the Campeonatos de Parejas as they were defeated by Taylor and Gargano two falls to one, following interference from Icarus. The following day, Harada and Kotoge were defeated by Fire Ant and Soldier Ant at a show in Kingsport, Tennessee.

=== Pro Wrestling Noah (2013–2023) ===
On May 2, 2013, Pro Wrestling Noah held a press conference, officially announcing that Harada had signed with the promotion. Harada wrestled his first match under a Noah contract on May 12, when he was defeated by former tag team partner Atsushi Kotoge in a singles match. Harada picked up his first win under a Noah contract on May 18, when he defeated rookie Hitoshi Kumano. Harada then hand-picked Kumano as his partner for the 2013 NTV G+ Cup Junior Heavyweight Tag League, which was contested for the vacant GHC Junior Heavyweight Tag Team Championship and took place between July 11 and 28. Despite eyeing a match with Atsushi Kotoge and Taiji Ishimori in the finals, Harada and Kumano ended up losing all four of their matches, failing to advance from their block. On August 24, Harada gained a measure of revenge on Kotoge by pinning him in a tag team match, where he and Kumano faced Kotoge and Ishimori. Later in the event, Harada and Kumano nominated themselves as the next challengers for the GHC Junior Heavyweight Tag Team Championship. On September 7, Harada picked up a major singles win over one half of the reigning champions, NJPW representative Jyushin Thunder Liger. However, on September 16, Harada and Kumano failed to capture the GHC Junior Heavyweight Tag Team Championship from Liger and Tiger Mask. On October 19, Harada pinned GHC Junior Heavyweight Champion Taiji Ishimori in a six-man tag team match, after which he was named the next challenger for his title. Harada received his title shot on November 2, but was defeated by Ishimori. On December 31, Harada made a one-night return to Osaka Pro, teaming with Takoyakida and Ultimate Spider Jr. in a six-man tag team main event, where they defeated Bad Stream (Kazuaki Mihara, Quiet Storm and Tadasuke). On January 3, 2014, Harada returned to NJPW, teaming with Hitoshi Kumano in a tag team match, where they were defeated by Jyushin Thunder Liger and Super Strong Machine.

Harada started off his 2014 in Noah with a win over Atsushi Kotoge on January 5, after which he announced that he wanted to join the No Mercy stable. On January 12, though defeated by No Mercy leader Kenta in a singles match, Harada was accepted as the newest member of the stable. According to Harada, one of his main reasons for joining No Mercy was to continue chasing the GHC Junior Heavyweight Championship, held by Taiji Ishimori, who represented No Mercy's rival stable, Brave. On January 25, Harada pinned Ishimori in a six-man tag team match between No Mercy and Brave to earn another shot at his title. On March 8, Harada defeated Ishimori to win the GHC Junior Heavyweight Championship for the first time. Harada made his first successful title defense on April 19 against former tag team partner Atsushi Kotoge. His second successful defense took place on May 31 against Quiet Storm. On July 5, Harada defeated Kenoh for his third successful title defense. Later in the month, Harada came together with Quiet Storm to take part in the 2014 NTV G+ Cup Junior Heavyweight Tag League. After finishing their round-robin block with a record of three wins and one loss, Harada and Storm advanced to the finals on August 2, where they were defeated by Hajime Ohara and Kenoh. Harada avenged the loss against Ohara by pinning him in a three-way match, also involving Zack Sabre Jr., on August 17 to make his fourth successful defense of the GHC Junior Heavyweight Championship. Harada continued making successful defenses of the GHC Junior Heavyweight Championship, defeating Shiori Asahi on September 21, Super Crazy on October 12, and Zack Sabre Jr. on November 4. Harada's reign ended on December 6, when he was defeated by Atsushi Kotoge in his eighth title defense. On January 18, 2015, Harada and No Mercy stablemate Genba Hirayanagi unsuccessfully challenged Hajime Ohara and Kenoh for the GHC Junior Heavyweight Tag Team Championship. Six days later, Harada also received a rematch for the GHC Junior Heavyweight Championship, but was again defeated by Kotoge. In March, Harada traveled to Germany to take part in Westside Xtreme Wrestling's (wXw) 2015 16 Carat Gold tournament, where he made it to the quarterfinals, before losing to Zack Sabre Jr. On June 13, Harada received a shot at the GHC Junior Heavyweight Championship, but was defeated by the defending champion, Taichi, after being hit with the title belt.

From July 18 to August 5, Harada took part in the 2015 Global Junior Heavyweight League, where he won his block with a record of five wins and one loss, advancing to the finals, where he defeated Atsushi Kotoge to earn another shot at Taichi's title. On August 22, Harada and Kotoge announced they were reuniting for the 2015 NTV G+ Cup Junior Heavyweight Tag League, which would mark their first matches together as a tag team in four years. Harada received his shot at the GHC Junior Heavyweight Championship on September 19, but was defeated by Taichi. On September 22, Harada and Kotoge finished their round-robin block in the NTV G+ Cup Junior Heavyweight Tag League with a record of three wins and one loss, winning their block and advancing to the finals. Later that same day, they defeated the reigning GHC Junior Heavyweight Tag Team Champions El Desperado and Taka Michinoku in the finals to win the tournament. This led to a match on October 4, where Harada and Kotoge defeated El Desperado and Taka Michinoku to win the GHC Junior Heavyweight Tag Team Championship, becoming the first Noah wrestlers to reclaim one of the four GHC titles from the Suzuki-gun stable. Afterwards, Harada and Kotoge continued feuding with Suzuki-gun by successfully defending their title against members of the stable; first defeating El Desperado and Michinoku in a rematch on December 23, then defeating Taichi and Michinoku on January 31, 2016, and finally defeating Taichi and Yoshinobu Kanemaru on February 19. On March 19, Harada and Kotoge lost the title to Hajime Ohara and Kenoh. Harada and Kotoge regained the title in a rematch on April 5. They then went back to defending the title against Suzuki-gun, defeating El Desperado and Taka Michinoku for their first successful defense on April 30, before defeating Ohara and Kenoh in a title rematch on May 28. On June 12, Harada and Kotoge won a three-way match, defeating the Suzuki-gun team of Michinoku and Taichi as well as Gedo and Jado, to make their third successful title defense.

On July 5, Harada defeated Hajime Ohara in a four-man tournament final to win one of Noah's three spots in NJPW's 2016 Super J-Cup. On July 20, Harada was eliminated from the tournament in his first round match by Ryusuke Taguchi. Later that month back in Noah, Harada and Kotoge made it to the finals of the 2016 NTV G+ Cup Junior Heavyweight Tag League, but were defeated there by A. C. H. and Taiji Ishimori. This led to a title match on August 21 at a NJPW show, where Harada and Kotoge defeated ACH and Ishimori for their fourth successful title defense, afterwards nominating Gedo and Jado as their next challengers. On October 8, Harada and Kotoge lost the title to Gedo and Jado. On November 22, Harada unsuccessfully challenged Kotoge for the GHC Junior Heavyweight Championship. On December 24, Harada and Kotoge regained the GHC Junior Heavyweight Tag Team Championship from Gedo and Jado. Two days later, Harada and Kotoge relinquished the title as Kotoge transitioned into Noah's heavyweight division. Harada received a GHC Junior Heavyweight Championship match on January 21, 2017, but was ultimately unsuccessful against defending champion Hajime Ohara. Momo no Seishun Tag formally disbanded on February 14, after Kotoge defeated Harada in a singles match. On February 18, Harada reunited with Tadasuke as the two stepped forward to challenge newly crowned GHC Junior Heavyweight Tag Team Champions Hi69 and Taiji Ishimori. Three days later, Harada and Tadasuke came together with Hayata and Yo-Hey to form a new stable named Ratel's. On March 12, Harada and Tadasuke failed to capture the GHC Junior Heavyweight Tag Team Championship from Hi69 and Ishimori.

On October 1, Harada defeated Taiji Ishimori to win the GHC Junior Heavyweight Championship for the second time. Afterwards, Harada challenged his Ratel's stablemates Hayata and Yo-Hey to a match for their GHC Junior Heavyweight Tag Team Championship with Tadasuke as his partner, leading to a match on October 28, where they were defeated by the champions. On November 19, he defeated Tadasuke for his first successful defense. On December 22, he defeated Minoru Tanaka to make his second defense. On January 27, he defeated Hajime Ohara for his third defense, afterwards accepting a challenge from his stablemate HAYATA. This led to a match on March 11, where Harada defeated HAYATA for his fourth defense, but later lost the title to Kotaro Suzuki.

On March 2, 2023, it was announced that Harada was forced to end his career due to sustaining serious injuries. He had his last match the following week, at Noah Star Navigation 2023, where he fought Atsushi Kotoge in a time-limit draw.

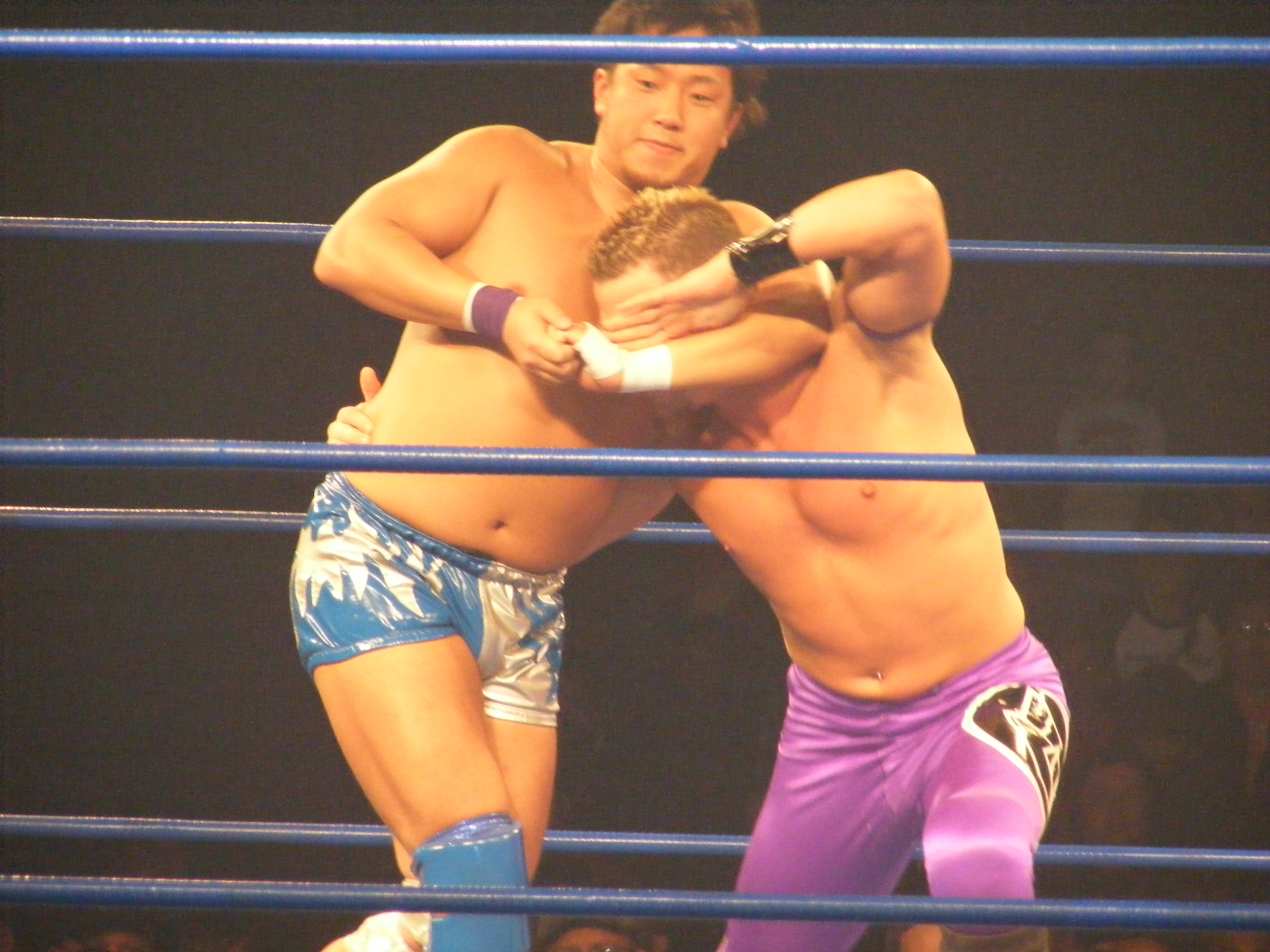
Harada holding Icarus in a headlock

== Championships and accomplishments ==
=== Amateur wrestling ===
- Osaka Prefecture's High School Amateur Wrestling Championship
  - Champion at 60 kg (130 lb)

=== Professional wrestling ===
- Dragon Gate
  - Open the Triangle Gate Championship (1 time) – with Atsushi Kotoge and Yo-Hey
- International Pro Wrestling: United Kingdom
  - IPW:UK Junior Heavyweight Championship (2 times)
- Osaka Pro Wrestling
  - Osaka Pro Wrestling Championship (2 times)
  - Osaka Pro Wrestling Tag Team Championship (3 times) – with Atsushi Kotoge
  - UWA World Trios Championship (1 time) – with Atsushi Kotoge and Takoyakida
  - Kamigata Pro–Wrestling Newcomer Grand Prix (2007)
  - Osaka Pro Singles Title Next Challenger League (2010)
  - Osaka Pro Singles Title Next Challenger Tournament (2012)
  - Osaka Pro Wrestling 6 Person Tag Tournament (2012) – with Hayata and Tadasuke
  - Osaka Tag Festival (2008) – with Zeus
  - Tennōzan (2011, 2012)
- Pro Wrestling Illustrated
  - Ranked No. 234 of the top 500 singles wrestlers in the PWI 500 in 2019
- Pro Wrestling Noah
  - GHC Junior Heavyweight Championship (5 times)
  - GHC Junior Heavyweight Tag Team Championship (6 times) – with Atsushi Kotoge (4), Tadasuke (1) and Hajime Ohara (1)
  - Global Junior Heavyweight League/Jr. Rumble (2015, 2020, 2022)
  - NTV G+ Cup Junior Heavyweight Tag League/N Innovation U-Cup (2015, 2022) – with Atsushi Kotoge (2), Hajime Ohara (1) and Junta Miyawaki (1)
  - NTV G+ Cup Junior Heavyweight Tag League Outstanding Performance Award (2014) – with Quiet Storm
  - Super J-Cup Qualifying Tournament C (2016)
