= Stevie Turner =

English professional wrestler (born 1996)

Personal information
- Born: Lucy Bridge; 15 December 1996 (age 29) Paddington, London, England
- Spouse: Kit Wilson (m. 2024)

Professional wrestling career
- Ring name(s): Bobbi Tyler; Stevie Turner
- Billed height: 5 ft 5 in (1.65 m)
- Billed weight: 110 lb (50 kg)
- Billed from: London, England
- Trained by: Paul Ashe; WWE Performance Center
- Debut: 11 June 2016

Lucy Bridge (born 15 December 1996) is an English professional wrestler. She is best known for her tenure in WWE, where she performed under the ring name Stevie Turner. She also performed on the independent circuit under the ring name Bobbi Tyler.

== Professional wrestling career ==
=== Independent circuit (2016–2021) ===
Bridge, under the ring name Bobbi Tyler, spent five years wrestling on the UK independent circuit from June 2016 to March 2021. Within that span, Tyler held six titles, winning the PWP Catch Division Championship and Women's Championship while with Pro Wrestling Pride, and two others while wrestling in International Pro Wrestling: United Kingdom, a single title while in House Of Glory, and a single title reign while in Ultimate Pro Wrestling. She also appeared for World Wonder Ring Stardom, where she was a member of Tokyo Cyber Squad.

=== WWE (2021–2025) ===
On 25 March 2021, Bridge signed a contract with WWE. She made her debut on 1 April episode of NXT UK under the ring name Stevie Turner, where she lost to Aoife Valkyrie. Behind the scenes, Turner declared that she had traveled the world to get there in which she was close to defeating one of the most dominant women of the brand. On 6 May, a promo cartoon came out in which Turner stated that she would go after every woman in NXT UK by admitting and naming herself "The Fourth Dimension 4D". With her new gimmick, Turner defeated Laura Di Matteo on 12 May episode of NXT UK. Turner had a few victories until she faced NXT UK Women's Champion Meiko Satomura at the WWE Performance Center, interrupting her in her training, which would give her a shot at the title. On 19 August episode of NXT UK, she lost to Satomura in the title bout. Due to the brand closure in order to be rebranded on-screen as NXT Europe, Turner did not appear the rest of the year on television.

At NXT: New Year's Evil on 10 January 2023, Turner debuted on the NXT brand through a televised promo with the gimmick of a streamer giving her criticism of some women's matches. On 31 January episode of NXT, Turner made her in-ring debut on the brand, defeating Dani Palmer. She began teasing a feud with Lyra Valkyria, but suffered an injury in March that kept her out of action for several months. She began making appearances on NXT Level Up in the summer of 2023. In April 2024, Turner began trying to convince NXT General Manager Ava, to give her more matches. On 4 June episode of NXT, Turner lost to Jordynne Grace, who had been appearing in NXT as part of the partnership between WWE and Total Nonstop Action Wrestling (TNA). Following this, Turner tried to convince Ava to make her an Assistant General Manager of NXT and frequently clashed with Robert Stone, who also got the role, making them the co-Assistant General Manager of NXT. On the 26 March 2025 episode of Evolve, Ava announced that Turner will take on an additional role as the new General Manager of the Evolve brand, to which she later dubbed herself as the Evolve Prime Minister. On 10 October, Turner announced that she would be leaving WWE, ending her four-year tenure with promotion. She made her final WWE televised appearance on the 6 November episode of Evolve.

== Personal life ==
On 22 September 2024, Bridge married fellow professional wrestler Sam Stoker, who performs in WWE under the ring name Kit Wilson.

== Championships and accomplishments ==
- House of Glory
  - HOG Women's Championship (1 time)
- International Pro Wrestling: United Kingdom
  - IPW:UK Women's Championship (2 times)
- Knockout Wrestling Entertainment
  - KWE Media Championship (1 time)
- Pro Wrestling Pride
  - PWP Catch Division Championship (1 times)
  - PWP Women's Championship (2 times, final)
- Ultimate Pro Wrestling
  - UPW Women's Championship (1 time, inaugural)
