= IPW:UK Women's Championship =

Professional wrestling women's championship

Details
- Promotion: International Pro Wrestling: United Kingdom (2015-2020); International Wrestling Network (2024-2024)
- Date established: 20 December 2015
- Date retired: 17 November 2020; 25 July 2024

Other names
- IPW:UK Women's Championship (2015-2020) * IWN Women‘s Championship (2024-2024)
Statistics
- First champion: Tennessee Honey
- Final champion: Bobbi Tyler
- Most reigns: Livvii Grace (3 times)
- Longest reign: Bobbi Tyler (604 days)
- Shortest reign: Pollyanna (<1 day)

The IPW:UK Women's Championship was a women's professional wrestling championship created and promoted by the English professional wrestling promotion, International Pro Wrestling: United Kingdom. The championship was originally established on 20 December 2015 and Tennessee Honey was the inaugural champion.

== Title history ==
The championship was originally established on 20 December 2015 at Christmas Cracker 2015. Tennessee Honey defeated Addy Starr with Jetta as the special guest ref. to become the inaugural champion.

Key
| No. | Overall reign number |
| Reign | Reign number for the specific champion |
| Days | Number of days held |
| + | Current reign is changing daily |

| No. | Champion | Championship change | | | Reign statistics | | Notes | Ref. |
| No. | Champion | Date | Event | Location | Reign | Days | Notes | Ref. |
|---|---|---|---|---|---|---|---|---|
| 1 | Tennessee Honey | 20 December 2015 | Christmas Cracker | Tonbridge, Kent, England | 1 | 99 | Honey defeated Addy Starr to become the inaugural champion. Jetta served as the special guest referee. | |
| 2 | Jetta | 28 March 2016 | Supershow 2 | Rochester, Kent, England | 1 | 69 | This was a three-way match, also involving Nikki Storm. | |
| 3 | Tennessee Honey | 5 June 2016 | IPW:UK 200 | Tonbridge, Kent, England | 2 | 126 | Xia Brookside served as the special guest referee. | |
| 4 | Mickie James | 9 October 2016 | Super 8 - Night 2 | Rochester, Kent, England | 1 | 70 | | |
| — | Vacated | 18 December 2016 | — | — | — | — | Mickie James vacated the championship due to being unable to defend the title. | |
| 5 | Pollyanna | 18 December 2016 | Supershow 5 | Rochester, Kent, England | 1 | <1 | Pollyanna defeated Tennessee Honey to win the vacant championship. | |
| 6 | Amazon | 18 December 2016 | Supershow 5 | Rochester, Kent, England | 1 | 63 | Amazon cashed-in her "anytime" title shot. | |
| 7 | Livvii Grace | 19 February 2017 | Live in Harlow | Harlow, Essex, England | 3 | 301 | This was a four-way match, also involving Chakara and Nightshade. Grace is formerly known as Tennessee Honey. | |
| 8 | Xia Brookside | 17 December 2017 | The Big Bang: Undisputed | Rochester, Kent, England | 1 | 279 | | |
| 9 | Bobbi Tyler | 22 September 2018 | IPW:UK Anniversary XIV | Maidstone, Kent, England | 1 | 92 | | |
| 10 | Sierra Loxton | 23 December 2018 | Undisputed II | Maidstone, Kent, England | 1 | 91 | | |
| 11 | Bobbi Tyler | 24 March 2019 | International Battle Royale | Maidstone, Kent, England | 1 | 604 | | |
| — | Deactivated | 17 November 2020 | — | — | — | — | The title was declared vacant and retired on 17 November 2020. | |
| 12 | Haley J | 29 February 2024 | IWN Parade Of Champions | Milton Keynes, Buckinghamshire, England | 1 | 117 | | |
| — | Deactivated | 25 June 2024 | — | — | — | — | The title retired on 25 July 2024. | |

== Combined reigns ==
As of 7 June 2026.

| † | Indicates the current champion |
| <1 | Indicates reign is less than one day |

| Rank | Champion | No. of reigns | Combined days |
|---|---|---|---|
| 1 | Bobbi Tyler | 2 | 695 |
| 2 | Livvii Grace/Tennessee Honey | 3 | 526 |
| 3 | Xia Brookside | 1 | 279 |
| 4 | Haley J | 1 | 117 |
| 5 | Sierra Loxton | 1 | 91 |
| 6 | Mickie James | 1 | 70 |
| 7 | Jetta | 1 | 69 |
| 8 | Amazon | 1 | 63 |
| 9 | Pollyanna | 1 | <1 |

== See also ==
- IPW:UK World Championship
- IPW:UK Tag Team Championship
- IPW:UK Junior Heavyweight Championship
