= Tadasuke =

Japanese professional wrestler

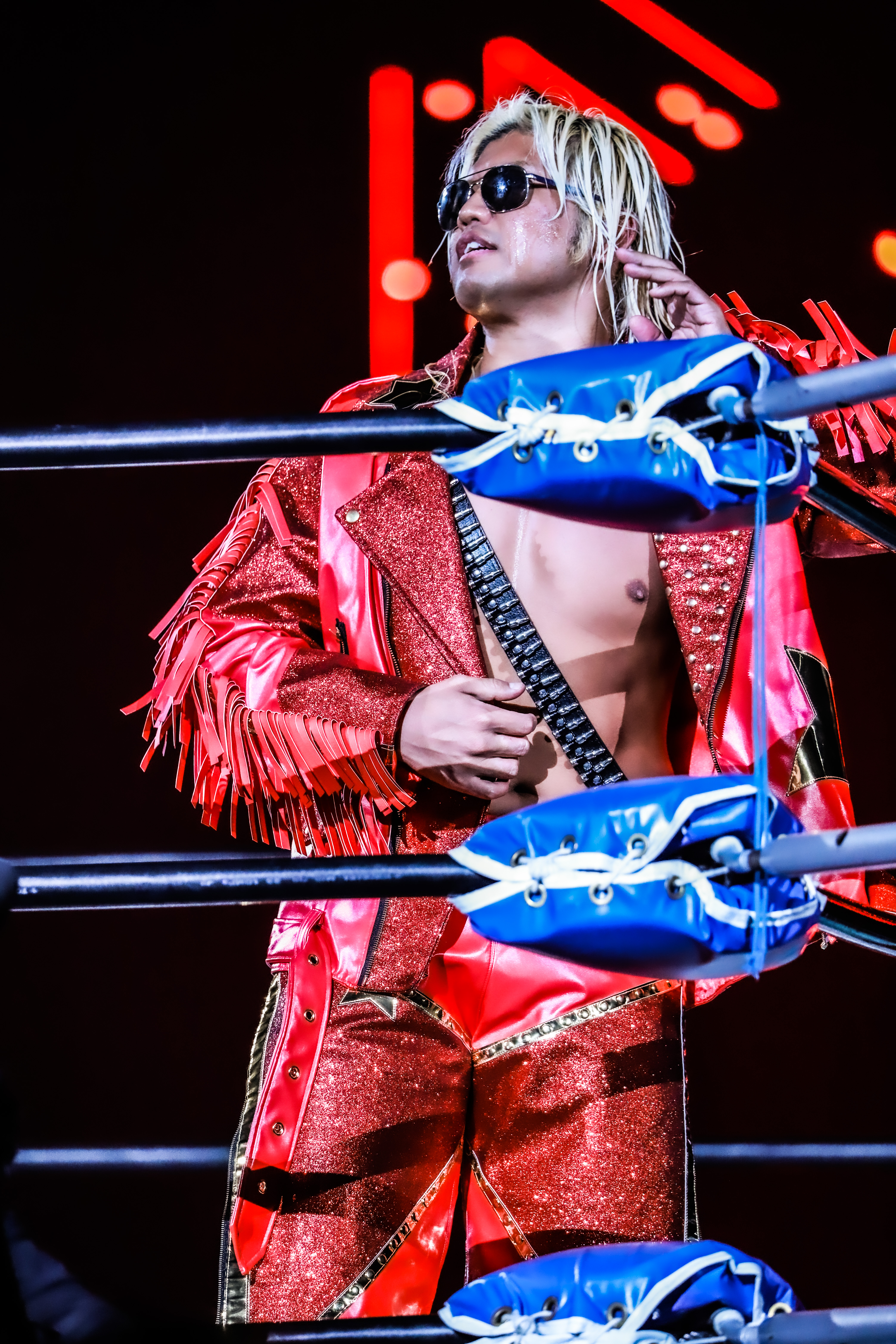
- Tadasuke at Noah Ariake Triumph on October 30, 2022

Personal information
- Born: Tadasuke Yoshida (吉田忠輔, Yoshida Tadasuke); January 13, 1986 (age 40) Kyoto, Kyoto Prefecture

Professional wrestling career
- Ring name(s): Kung Fu; New Costume Tadasuke; Tadanosuke Matsuyama; Tadasa; Tadasuke
- Billed height: 1.73 m (5 ft 8 in)
- Billed weight: 95 kg (209 lb)
- Trained by: Ultimo Dragon; Tigers Mask; Funaki
- Debut: April 29, 2007

Tadasuke Yoshida (吉田忠輔, Yoshida Tadasuke; born January 13, 1986), known mononymously as Tadasuke (タダスケ) is a Japanese professional wrestler, currently signed to Pro Wrestling Noah, where he is a member of the Team 2000X stable. He is best known for his work in Osaka Pro Wrestling, where he is a former one-time Osaka Pro Wrestling Champion, three-time Osaka Pro Wrestling Tag Team Champions and a one-time Osaka Pro Wrestling Battle Royal Champion, while also being the winner of the 2012 Osaka Tag Festival. He has also made appearances in the United States for the Chikara promotion, where he is a former holder of the Young Lions Cup.

== Professional wrestling career ==
=== Toryumon Japan (2004) ===
Tadasuke started training in the Toryumon Japan Dojo alongside BxB Hulk, Shingo Takagi, Yūki Ōno & Akira Tozawa as part of the 15th class. Unfortunately though, after the dissolution of Toryumon Japan into Dragon Gate there was a reduced number of trainees in the new dojo, and Tadasuke didn't make it in.

=== Osaka Pro Wrestling (2007–2014) ===
Tadasuke made his professional wrestling debut on April 29, 2007, losing to Tsubasa at Osaka Pro Wrestling's eighth anniversary event. As is typical for a rookie in Japanese professional wrestling, Tadasuke's first year in the business consisted solely of losses. The losing streak finally ended on March 22, 2008, when Tadasuke pinned Robert Tanaka, with whom he had developed a storyline rivalry during the past year. Later in the event, Tadasuke confronted Daisuke Harada and Zeus, who eventually accepted him as the third member of their new Blood & Guts stable. During the next few months, Tadasuke started picking up wins more regularly during Blood & Guts' rivalry with the Bad Force stable, though he was still seen as the lowest ranking member of his stable. On June 21, Tadasuke entered the 2008 Osaka Tag Festival, teaming with fellow Blood & Guts member Atsushi Kotoge. Tadasuke and Kotoge eventually made it to the finals of the tournament on June 29, where they were defeated by their stablemates Daisuke Harada and Zeus. Following the dissolution of Bad Force, Blood & Guts found new rivals in the Legion of Violence (LOV) stable. On March 14, 2009, Tadasuke, Harada and Kotoge entered a series to determine, which of the three would get to challenge for the Independent World Junior Heavyweight Championship. After each of the three finished the series with one win and one loss, a deciding three-way match was set for April 4, where Harada was victorious. In late 2008, Tadasuke had started to exhibit villainous behaviour, which eventually led to him turning on Blood & Guts on June 6, 2009, and jumping to Legion of Violence. During the next months, Tadasuke finally made his breakthrough by starting a rivalry with Billyken Kid, which eventually culminated in a Lucha de Apuestas Mask vs. Hair match on August 23, where Tadasuke was defeated and, as a result, shaved bald. On April 3, 2010, Tadasuke entered a round-robin tournament to determine the number one contender to the Osaka Pro Wrestling Championship. After picking up early wins over former stablemates Daisuke Harada and Atsushi Kotoge, Tadasuke suffered a loss against Kazuaki Mihara, and was as a result placed in a tiebreaker match on April 17, where Daisuke Harada was victorious and won the tournament.

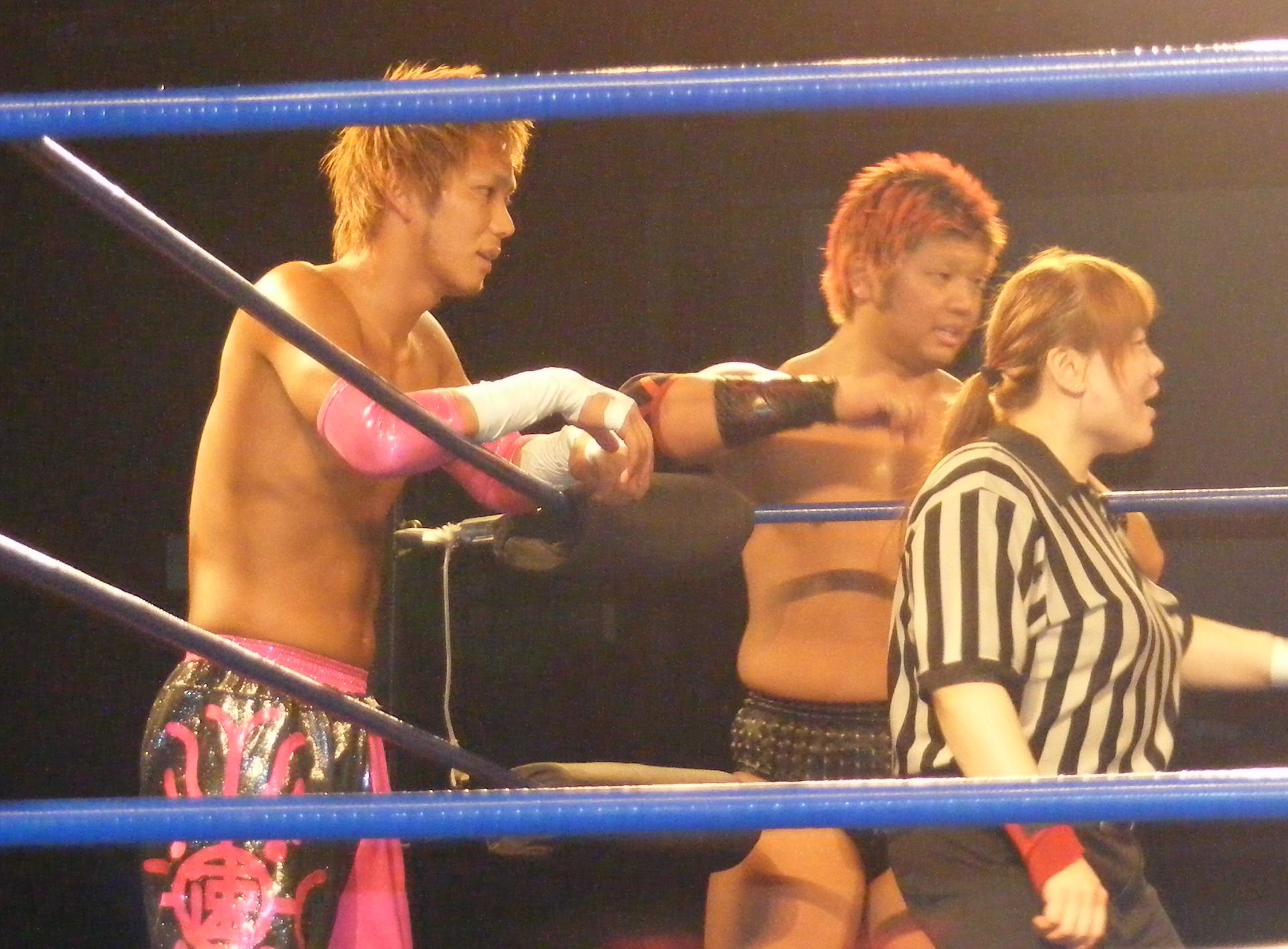
Tadasuke and Atsushi Kotoge in April 2010

Later in April, Tadasuke reunited with Atsushi Kotoge and Daisuke Harada to represent Osaka Pro in Chikara's 2010 King of Trios tournament, with all three making their American debuts in the process. In their first round match in the tournament on April 23, Team Osaka Pro defeated The UnStable (Colin Delaney, Stigma and Vin Gerard). Unlike his partners, Tadasuke worked the tour as a villain, and in the following day's quarterfinal match, used his antics to eliminate the reigning King of Trios, F.I.S.T. (Chuck Taylor, Gran Akuma and Icarus), from the tournament by pinning Taylor, while holding his tights. On April 25, Team Osaka Pro was eliminated from the tournament in the semifinals by The Colony (Fire Ant, Green Ant and Soldier Ant). Back in Osaka Pro, Tadasuke, The Bodyguard and Orochi teamed up to unsuccessfully challenge Harada, Kotoge and Takoyakida for the UWA World Trios Championship on May 29. On September 16, Tadasuke made his debut for New Japan Pro-Wrestling, teaming with Yosuke Takii in a losing effort against the team of No Limit (Tetsuya Naito and Yujiro Takahashi) in the main event of NEVER.2.

On December 26, 2010, Orochi, Tadasuke's tag team partner, who had recently turned on LOV and joined the new Joker stable, which had taken over the spot as Osaka Pro's top heel group, approached Tadasuke after a match and handed him a letter. On January 29, 2011, Tadasuke turned on Black Buffalo and Tigers Mask, the last two remaining members of LOV, helping Kuuga and Orochi successfully defend the Osaka Pro Wrestling Tag Team Championship in the process. As a member of Joker, Tadasuke went on a win streak, which included singles victories over both Black Buffalo and Tigers Mask. On March 6, Tadasuke and Orochi wrestled Momo no Seishun Tag (Atsushi Kotoge and Daisuke Harada) to a double knockout in an Osaka Pro Wrestling Tag Team Championship number one contender's match. As a result, a three-way match was made for March 19, where Tadasuke and Orochi defeated Momo no Seishun Tag and defending champion, Big Guns (The Bodyguard and Zeus), to become the new Osaka Pro Wrestling Tag Team Champions. The following day, Tadasuke made an appearance for women's wrestling promotion Pro Wrestling Wave, defeating Sawako Shimono in an intergender match. The following month, Tadasuke, Hayata and Kuuga made it to the finals of the 12th Anniversary Six Man Tag Tournament, before being defeated by Black Buffalo, Naoki Setoguchi and Tigers Mask. Tadasuke's win streak eventually led to him unsuccessfully challenging Tigers Mask for the Osaka Pro Wrestling Championship on May 22. On July 18, Tadasuke and Orochi lost the Osaka Pro Wrestling Tag Team Championship to Momo no Seishun Tag in a three-way match, which also included the team of Takoyakida and Ultimate Spider Jr.

In August 2011, Chikara announced that Tadasuke would be returning to the promotion to take part in the ninth Young Lions Cup tournament. At 25 years and seven months old, this would be Tadasuke's only opportunity to enter the tournament, which had a 26-year age limit. Due to Hurricane Irene, the tournament, originally scheduled for two days, took place in one day on August 27 in Easton, Pennsylvania. In his opening four-way elimination match, Tadasuke defeated Mark Andrews, Nick Jackson and Sean South. Later in the day, Tadasuke defeated Archibald Peck to make it to the finals of the tournament, where he eventually defeated Green Ant to become the first Japanese Young Lions Cup Champion, taking the title with him back to Japan. On October 30, Tadasuke received another shot at the Osaka Pro Wrestling Championship, but was defeated by Billyken Kid. On December 3, Tadasuke injured his knee in a Tenno-zan tournament match against Joker stablemate Kuuga and was, as a result, sidelined for the rest of the year. Upon his return to the ring, Tadasuke made his first defense of the Chikara Young Lions Cup, defeating Sawako Shimono at an Osaka Pro event on January 28, 2012. His second defense took place on March 16, when he defeated Kazuaki Mihara. On April 29, Tadasuke reunited with Atsushi Kotoge and Daisuke Harada for one night only, when the three defeated Billyken Kid, Black Buffalo and Tigers Mask in Kotoge's final Osaka Pro match. The following month, Tadasuke made it to the finals of a tournament to determine the number one contender to the Osaka Pro Wrestling Championship, but was there, on May 26, defeated by Daisuke Harada. Later that same day, Tadasuke made his debut for Wrestling New Classic (WNC), when he replaced an injured Mio Shirai and teamed with Joker stablemate Hayata to defeat Lin Byron and Takuya Kito in a tag team match. In June, Joker began having problems with Hayata, after he started losing matches. As a result, Kuuga abandoned his Osaka Pro Wrestling Tag Team Championship partner to team with Joker's newest member, Spider J, in the 2012 Osaka Tag Festival, leaving Tadasuke to team with Hayata in the same tournament. On June 24, Tadasuke and Hayata defeated Kuuga and Spider J in the finals of the tournament to win the 2012 Osaka Tag Festival. Following their win, Tadasuke announced that both he and Hayata were quitting Joker.

Tadasuke and Hayata made their first post-Joker appearance on June 30, defeating former stablemates Kuuga and Orochi via disqualification, after Kuuga hit both of them with a steel chair. Later in the event, Tadasuke and Hayata made another appearance, inviting Daisuke Harada to join them. Harada accepted the invitation on July 7 and formed a new trio with Tadasuke and Hayata with the three sharing a common goal of stopping Joker. On July 14, the new alliance was named "Glare". On July 22 at Hurricane 2012, Osaka Pro's largest annual event, Tadasuke and Hayata defeated Sengoku (Hideyoshi and Masamune) and the Big Guns (The Bodyguard and Zeus) in a three-way match to win the vacant Osaka Pro Wrestling Tag Team Championship. Later in the event, Daisuke Harada completed Glare's clean sweep by defeating Black Buffalo to win the Osaka Pro Wrestling Championship, afterwards declaring that his stable was now going to change Osaka Pro. On August 18, Tadasuke relinquished the Chikara Young Lions Cup in time for the finals of the tenth annual tournament; meanwhile, Chikara announced that Tadasuke would be returning to the promotion the following month to challenge Eddie Kingston for the Chikara Grand Championship. Tadasuke received his title shot on September 15, during the second night of the 2012 King of Trios, but was defeated by Kingston. The following day, Tadasuke defeated Jigsaw in a singles match. Upon his return to Osaka Pro, Tadasuke began using the Chikara Special, the signature hold of the American promotion, as his finishing move. On September 30, Tadasuke and Hayata made their first successful defense of the Osaka Pro Wrestling Tag Team Championship against former Joker stablemates Kuuga and Orochi. On October 21, Glare won the Osaka Pro Wrestling 6 Person Tag Tournament, defeating the Joker trio of Hideyoshi, Kuuga and Quiet Storm in the finals. On November 2, Tadasuke became a double champion, when he defeated eleven other men to win the Osaka Pro Wrestling Battle Royal Championship. The following day, Tadasuke and Hayata made their second successful defense of the Osaka Pro Wrestling Tag Team Championship, defeating Black Buffalo and Tigers Mask. On November 25, Tadasuke defeated eight other men, including Daisuke Harada, to make his first successful defense of the Osaka Pro Wrestling Battle Royal Championship. On December 15, Tadasuke won another ten man battle royal for his second successful defense of the title. On January 19, 2013, Glare defeated Black Buffalo, Kazuaki Mihara and Naoki Setoguchi in a six-man tag team main event. After the match, Harada revealed Buffalo as the newest member of Glare. On February 24, Tadasuke, Buffalo, Harada and Hayata of Glare faced Billyken Kid, Kazuaki Mihara, Naoki Setoguchi and Tigers Mask of the Osaka Pro Seikigun in an elimination match, where the losing team would be forced to disband. Tadasuke was the second to last man eliminated from the match by Billyken Kid, who was then himself pinned for the win by Harada, saving Glare and forcing Seikigun to disband. On March 2, Billyken Kid and Kazuaki Mihara joined Glare, announcing they now agreed with the stable's "revolution". Glare then declared war on Joker and Unique Gundan, the two remaining stables in Osaka Pro. The rivalry between Glare and Unique Gundan built to a four-on-four elimination match on March 24, where Tadasuke, Harada, Hayata and Mihara suffered an upset defeat at the hands of Ebessan, Kanjyuro Matsuyama, Kuishinbo Kamen and Takoyakida, after which the two groups made peace with each other. On March 30, six top Osaka Pro wrestlers, including Tadasuke's Glare stablemates Daisuke Harada and Hayata, announced that they were quitting the promotion following April 29. As a result, Tadasuke and Hayata relinquished the Osaka Pro Tag Team Championship. On May 17, Tadasuke lost the Osaka Pro Battle Royal Championship to Kanjyuro Matsuyama. Two days later, Tadasuke and Kazuaki Mihara defeated the Big Guns, with help from Mikey Broderick and Quiet Storm, to win the vacant Osaka Pro Tag Team Championship. After the match, the four announced that they were forming a new stable named "Bad Stream". On July 21, Tadasuke and Mihara defeated the Big Guns in a rematch for their first successful title defense. On August 25, Bad Stream faced the newly revived Seikigun in the first big battle between the two, an eight-man elimination tag team match, where Tadasuke, Mihara, Broderick and Storm were defeated by Black Buffalo, The Bodyguard, Naoki Setoguchi and Zeus. On September 15, Tadasuke and Mihara made their second successful Tag Team Championship defense against Takoyakida and Ultimate Spider Jr. Tadasuke and Mihara made their third successful defense on September 28 against Seikigun representatives Naoki Setoguchi and Tigers Mask. On October 27, Tadasuke and Mihara lost the Tag Team Championship to the Big Guns in their fourth defense. On November 10, Tadasuke made a guest appearance for Apache Pro-Wrestling Army, where he and Tomohiko Hashimoto defeated Daisaku Shimoda and Rikiya Fudo to win the WEW World Tag Team Championship.

On January 19, 2014, Tadasuke announced that he would be resigning from Osaka Pro following February 23 and leaving for an indefinite learning excursion to the United States. As a parting gift, Tadasuke received a shot at the Osaka Pro Wrestling Championship on February 16, but was defeated by the defending champion, Zeus. Tadasuke's farewell tour also took him to the Dove Pro Wrestling promotion, where he was defeated by former tag team partner Hayata in his farewell match on February 21. Two days later Tadasuke wrestled his final Osaka Pro matches. First he teamed with Churaumu Saver, Katsumi Uribe and Zeus to defeat Kazuaki Mihara, Naoki Setoguchi, Takoyakida and Ultimate Spider Jr. in an eight-person tag team match and then, in the main event, defeated seventeen other men to win a battle royal. Tadasuke revealed that he would be training with Funaki in Texas with a goal of reaching the WWE. Later that same day, Tadasuke wrestled one final match in Japan for the women's wrestling promotion Osaka Joshi Pro Wrestling, defeating Sawako Shimono in the main event.

=== Funaki Dojo (2014–2016) ===
While training at the Funaki Dojo, Tadasuke also wrestled for several independent promotions in Texas, including Anachy Championship Wrestling (ACW), Inspire Pro Wrestling and National Wrestling Alliance Ark-La-Tx (NWA A-L-T). On June 7, 2014, Tadasuke returned to Japan and began taking bookings for various promotions. On September 7, Tadasuke returned to Apache Pro-Wrestling Army, where he and Tomohiko Hashimoto lost the WEW World Tag Team Championship to Ryoji Sai and Tetsuhiro Kuroda. On October 5, Tadasuke returned to Texas, working a Chikara and IPW co-promoted event, where he lost to Steve O'Reno in a three-way elimination match, which also included Dasher Hatfield. In early 2015, Tadasuke began working regularly on the Japanese independent circuit. On May 2, he took part in Osaka Pro Wrestling's 16th anniversary event, where he teamed with Atsushi Kotoge and Tsubasa in a six-man tag team main event, where they defeated Daisuke Harada, Kuishinbo Kamen and Ultimate Spider Jr. During the next months, Tadasuke worked for promotions such as Big Japan Pro Wrestling (BJW) and Doutonbori Pro Wrestling. On October 4, Tadasuke and Mihara unsuccessfully challenged Hub and Orochi for Doutonbori's WDW Tag Team Championship. On January 31, 2016, Tadasuke defeated Kaiju New World in the finals of the Tenno-zan tournament to win the vacant Osaka Pro Wrestling Championship. He lost the title to Hub in his second defense on July 31, 2016. Following the match, Tadasuke was taken to a hospital, where he was diagnosed with a dislocated left elbow.

=== Pro Wrestling Noah (2016–present) ===
On December 14, Tadasuke made his debut for Pro Wrestling Noah, teaming with Hayata in a tag team match, where they were defeated by Atsushi Kotoge and Daisuke Harada. Tadasuke continued working for Noah in January 2017, working a number of dates on the First Navig. 2017 tour. In February, Tadasuke, Daisuke Harada, Hayata and Yo-Hey formed a new stable named Ratel's. On March 12, Tadasuke and Harada unsuccessfully challenged Hi69 and Taiji Ishimori for the GHC Junior Heavyweight Tag Team Championship. On September 3, Noah officially announced that Tadasuke had signed an exclusive contract with the promotion, ending his days as a freelancer. On November 19, Tadasuke unsuccessfully challenged stablemate Harada for the GHC Junior Heavyweight Championship. On May 29, 2018, he and Harada unsuccessfully challenged Hi69 and Minoru Tanaka for the GHC Junior Heavyweight Tag Team Championship.

Tadasuke and Yo-Hey regained the GHC Junior Heavyweight Tag Team Championship on January 2, 2024 at Noah The New Year by defeating Los Golpeadores (Alpha Wolf and Dragon Bane) and Ninja Mack and Alejandro in a three-way match.

== Wrestling persona ==
Tadasuke is currently known as 'The Out Cast" and wears a leathers jacket and sunglasses to the ring. His finishing moves include the OutKast (Backbreaker rack spun out into a side slam) & the Jindanda Lariat (Lariat preceded by a Jindanda dance). He was a member of Kongo, a Heel unit between 2020 and 2023. He was also a member of the Ratel's under two different tenures, first between 2017 and 2020, and the second between September 2024 and March 2025.

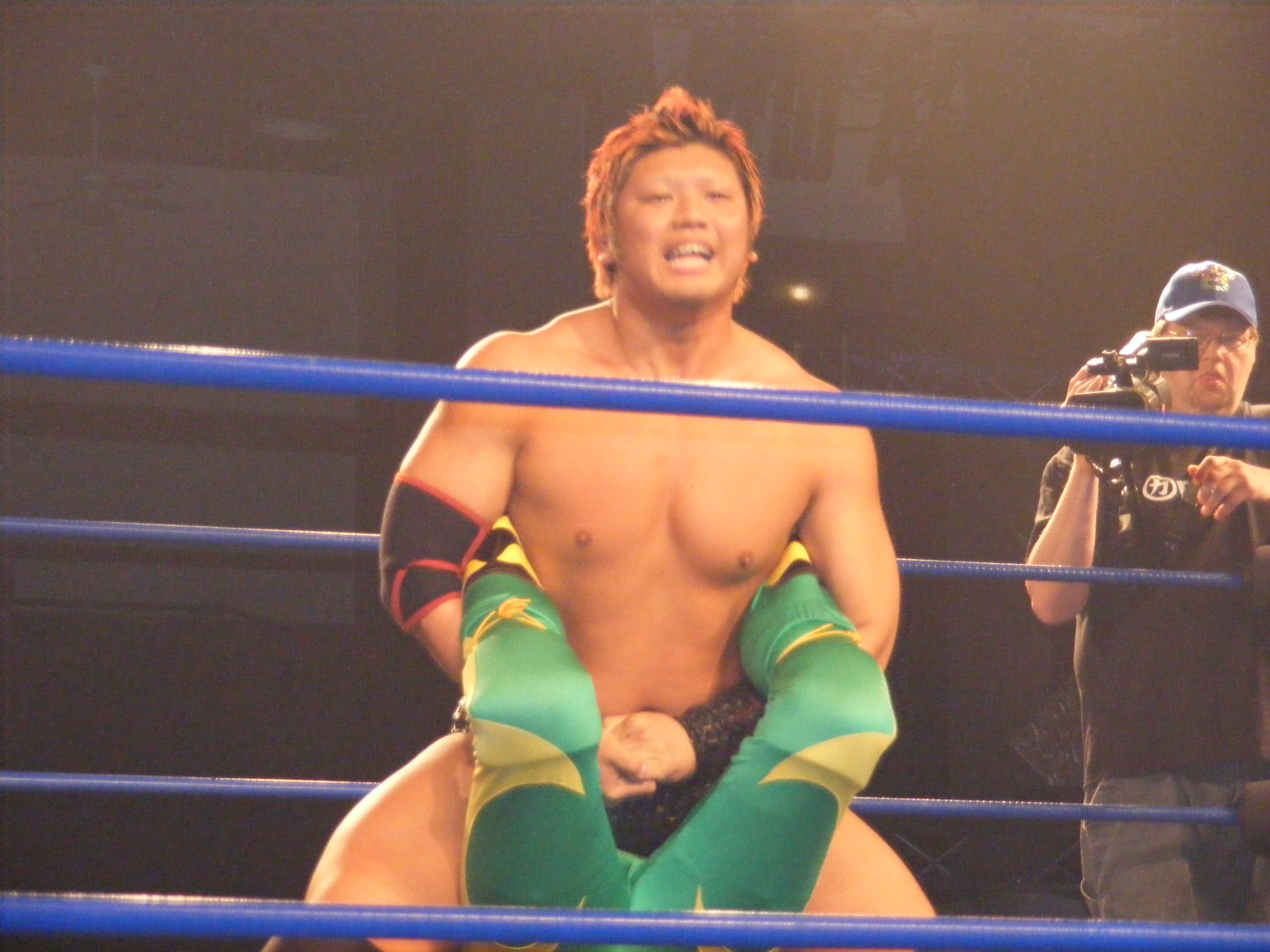
Tadasuke performing the WC on Green Ant

== Championships and accomplishments ==
- Apache Pro-Wrestling Army
  - WEW World Tag Team Championship (1 time) – with Tomohiko Hashimoto
- Chikara
  - Chikara Young Lions Cup (1 time)
- Dove Pro Wrestling
  - One Night Tag Tournament (2017) - with Hayata
- Osaka Pro Wrestling
  - Osaka Pro Wrestling Battle Royal Championship (1 time)
  - Osaka Pro Wrestling Championship (1 time)
  - Osaka Pro Wrestling Tag Team Championship (3 times) – with Orochi (1), Hayata (1), and Kazuaki Mihara (1)
  - Osaka Pro Wrestling 6 Person Tag Tournament (2012) – with Daisuke Harada and Hayata
  - Osaka Tag Festival (2012) – with Hayata
  - Tennōzan (2015)
- Pro Wrestling Noah
  - GHC Junior Heavyweight Tag Team Championship (3 times) – with Daisuke Harada (1) and Yo-Hey (2)

=== Luchas de Apuestas record ===
Winner (wager)	Loser (wager)	Location	Event	Date	Notes
Tadasuke (hair)	Atsushi Kotoge (hair)	Osaka, Osaka, Japan	Saturday Night Story	July 25, 2009	
Billyken Kid (mask)	Tadasuke (hair)	Osaka, Osaka, Japan	Osaka-Dama 2009	August 23, 2009	
