= Choukibou-gun =

Professional wrestling stable

Stable
- Members: Takeshi Morishima (leader); Maybach Taniguchi; Kenoh; Hajime Ohara; Mitsuhiro Kitamiya
- Name(s): Choukibou-gun; Morishima-gun
- Debut: January 5, 2014
- Disbanded: December 24, 2015

Choukibou-gun (超危暴軍, Chōkibōgun) was a professional wrestling stable in Pro Wrestling Noah. It was led by Takeshi Morishima.

== History ==
=== 2014 ===
Choukibou-gun officially formed on January 5, 2014 at New Years Navigation following the main event where Takeshi Morishima defeated Kenta to win the GHC Heavyweight Championship. After the match, Morishima's stablemates in Brave (Naomichi Marufuji, Muhammad Yone, and Taiji Ishimori) came out to congratulate the new champion. However, BRAVE would get attacked by Maybach Taniguchi and Kenoh with Morishima turning heel and joining in. Morishima would denounce both Brave & No Mercy and that his new stable would be the center of Noah's future. The stable would take part in its first tour later that month which was the First Navigation tour where they would be extremely successful winning almost all their matches. The only losses came on January 19 when Taniguchi lost to Kenta by disqualification while Morishima and Kenoh fell to New Japan's Yuji Nagata and Jyushin Thunder Liger and again on January 25 when Kenoh lost to Muhammad Yone. On January 25, Kenoh lost to Yone by disqualification after Yone was attacked by Hajime Ohara who then joined the group. In the main event, Morishima-army added more gold when Morishima and Taniguchi defeated TMDK to win the GHC Tag Team Championship thus given the group a monopoly on the heavyweight titles. Following the show, Morishima would officially name his group: Choukibou-gun. The groups's fortunes declined in February as Taniguchi lost to Kenta in no dq match which ended their feud. Five days later on February 8, Morishima's title reign abruptly ended when he lost the title to Yuji Nagata. From there, they were not as dominant as they traded wins and losses with TMDK, Brave, and No Mercy throughout the tour. On March 8 at Great Voyage In Tokyo, the stable had mixed results with Kenoh and Ohara failing to win the GHC Junior Heavyweight Tag Team Championship while Morishima and Taniguchi successfully defended the Heavyweight Tag Titles against TMDK and Taniguchi attacked Nagata following his title defense against Takashi Sugiura to establish himself as the next contender.

In April, Morishima and Taniguchi entered the Global Tag League but performed poorly as they finished in 7th place with only 4 points with their only wins being over TMDK and Chris Hero and Colt Cabana. The tour only got worse on April 20 when Taniguchi challenged Nagata for the GHC Heavyweight Title but lost. On May 31, Choukibou-gun would lose their only title when Morishima and Taniguchi lost the GHC Tag Titles to the Dangan Yankies (Takashi Suguira & Masato Tanaka) and Choukibou-gun continued to spiral when Morishima was hurt in June. On July 5 at Great Voyage in Tokyo Vol. 2, the group went 1-2 with Ohara winning a three way match against Super Crazy and Quiet Storm while Kenoh failed to win the GHC Junior Heavyweight Championship against Daisuke Harada and Taniguchi lost to Big Japan's Daisuke Sekimoto by disqualification. In July, Kenoh and Ohara entered 2014 NTV G+ Cup Junior Heavyweight Tag League and on August 2, Choukibou-gun were back on track as Morishima made a successful return as he teamed with Taniguchi to defeat new GHC Heavyweight Champion Naomichi Marufuji and Katsuhiko Nakajima with Morishima pinning Marufuji. In the main event, Ohara and Kenoh defeated Daisuke Harada and Quiet Storm to win the NTV G+ Cup Junior Heavyweight Tag League In August, Morishima would wrestle Marufuji in several tag matches where he usually picked up the win by pinning the champion. However, gold continued to elude them. On August 17, Ohara challenged Harada for the GHC Junior Heavyweight Title in a three way which also involved Zack Sabre, Jr but took the pinfall loss on Harada. On August 24, Morishima challenged Marufuji for the GHC Heavyweight Title but came up short.

On September 6, Choukibou-gun took on Brave in a four series match. While Ohara lost the first match to Kotoge by disqualification, the group would dominate the rest of the series by going 3-1 with Morishima defeating Nakajima, Taniguchi defeating Muhammad Yone and Kenoh would score a huge upset over Marufuji thanks to interference from Taniguchi. On September 23, Taniguchi would challenge Marufuji for the Heavyweight Championship but would also come up short. Less than a month later on October 12, Choukibou-gun would finally claim another title when Ohara and Kenoh defeated BRAVE's Taiji Ishimori and Atsushi Kotoge to win the GHC Junior Heavyweight Tag Team Titles. In October, Morishima and Taniguchi enter the Global League but neither won. Morishima would end up in 7th place with only 6 points though he did score wins over Shane Haste, Marufuji, and New Japan's Satoshi Kojima. Taniguchi fared much better placing 4th and scoring 8 points as he defeated Yone, Nagata, Mikey Nicholls, and Quiet Storm. On November 8, Tanaguchi faced Sugiura in a match to determine which would go to the finals. Unfortunately, Tanaguchi would suffer a crushing defeated as Suguira defeated him with a front necklock in less than two minutes. Choukibou-gun ended the year on a high note with Ohara and Kenoh making two successful title defenses as they defeated Jyushin Thunder Liger and Tiger Mask on December 6 then Super Crazy and Pesadilla on December 27 in a TLC match.

=== 2015 ===
Choukibou-gun began 2015 very well. On January 10 at the New Year Navigation show, Taniguchi, Kenoh, and Ohara lost a six-man tag to Yoshihiro Takayama, Akitoshi Saito, and Genba Hirayanagi while Morishima defeated Mitsuhiro Kitamiya in the fifth match of Kitamiya's series. Following the match, Kitamiya would shockingly join Choukibou-gun. On January 18, Kenoh and Ohara made a third successful title defense by defeating No Mercy's Daisuke Harada and Genba Hirayanagi. On March 15, Kenoh and Ohara lost the GHC Junior Heavyweight Tag Team Championship to Suzuki-gun's El Desperado and Taka Michinoku in a three-way match, also involving Harada and Hirayanagi.On March 28, Kenoh signed a contract with Noah, officially ending his affiliation with Michinoku Pro Wrestling and Ohara also signed a contract and officially ended his day of freelancer. On April 11 Ohara and Kenoh received a rematch for the GHC Junior Heavyweight Tag Team Championship but they lost. On April 21, Morishima announced his retirement from professional wrestling due to issues with his blood. Following Morishima's retirement from professional wrestling, Taniguchi entered the GHC Heavyweight Championship picture in May 2015, challenging Minoru Suzuki. On June 9, Taniguchi was unmasked during a tag team match, where he and Yoshihiro Takayama defeated Suzuki and Takashi Iizuka. Taniguchi received his title shot on June 15, but was defeated by Suzuki.On July at Global Junior Heavyweight League Ohara and Kenoh were in separate blocks, Kenoh on block A and Ohara on Block B. Neither Kenoh or Ohara advanced to the finals, though Kenoh finished his block with 8 points and Ohara with 6 points. On August 22, Ohara and Kenoh received a rematch for the GHC Junior Heavyweight Tag Team Championship, but were again defeated by Desperado and Michinoku. On December 24, Naomichi Marufuji dismantled all of Noah's stables, including Choukibou-gun, in order to unite the promotion against Suzuki-gun.

== Championships and accomplishments ==
- Pro Wrestling Noah
  - GHC Heavyweight Championship (1 time) – Morishima
  - GHC Junior Heavyweight Tag Team Championship (1 time) – Kenoh and Ohara
  - GHC Tag Team Championship (1 time) – Morishima and Taniguchi
  - NTV G+ Cup Junior Heavyweight Tag League (2014) – Kenoh and Ohara
