= Hitoshi Kumano =

Japanese professional wrestler

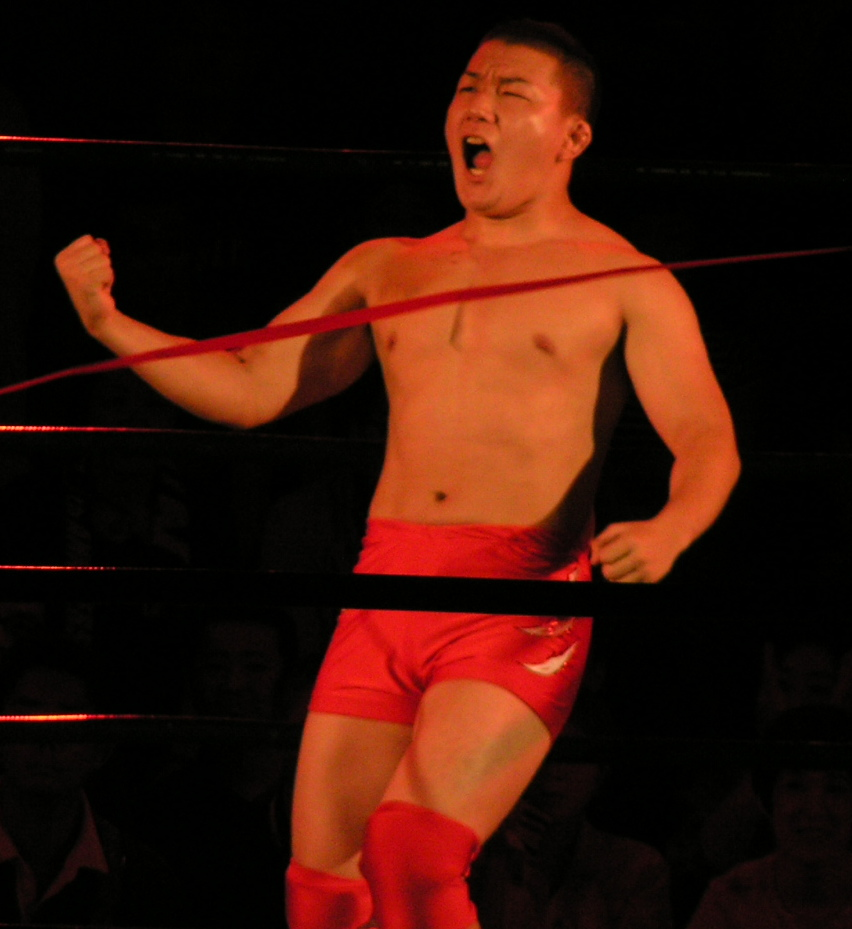
- Kumano in 2015

Personal information
- Born: November 22, 1991 (age 34) Hiroshima, Japan

Professional wrestling career
- Ring name(s): Hitoshi Kumano; Shirokuma no Hitoshi
- Billed height: 1.70 m (5 ft 7 in)
- Billed weight: 90 kg (198 lb)
- Trained by: Atsushi Kotoge; Naomichi Marufuji; Daisuke Harada
- Debut: February 9, 2013
- Retired: March 9, 2020

Hitoshi Kumano (熊野 準, Kumano Hitoshi; born November 22, 1991) is a Japanese professional wrestler trained by and signed to Pro Wrestling Noah.

== Early life ==
Kumano first became interested in professional wrestling while still in elementary school after playing King of Colloseum 2 on the PlayStation 2. He joined the wrestling team at the Hiroshima International High School and became a regular competitor at national level in the 55 kg class. After graduating high school, he attended college at the Hiroshima University, where he earned qualifications to be a Sports Trainer. After graduating from college on April 15, 2012, he passed a tryout to join Pro Wrestling Noah's dojo, and began training on May 22. Whilst simultaneously training as a professional wrestler, Kumano attended school for business management.

== Professional wrestling career ==
After training in the NOAH dojo under the watch of Naomichi Marufuji, Daisuke Harada and Atsushi Kotoge, Kumano made his in-ring debut in January 2013, losing in a battle royal. In doing so, Kumano became the first wrestler to make his debut in NOAH since Shuhei Taniguchi in 2005. Kumano's next 7 matches were all battle royals, and he lost all of them. His singles debut took place on February 9, when he lost to his trainer, Kotoge. On May 11 at Kenta Kobashi's retirement show, Final Burning in Budokan, Kumano wrestled the biggest match in his career up until that point, losing to veteran Masanobu Fuchi. Kumano remained winless until June 30, when he, Harada and Taiji Ishimori defeated Kaiser, Pesadilla and Super Crazy. The following month, Kumano entered the NTV G Cup Junior Heavyweight League, finishing last in Block A with zero wins and zero points. On August 24, Kumano achieved the biggest win of his career so far, when he and Harada defeated his trainer Kotoge and Ishimori. Kumano received his first opportunity at a championship on September 16 when he and Harada unsuccessfully challenged Jushin Thunder Liger and Tiger Mask IV for the GHC Junior Heavyweight Tag Team Championship. In July 2014, Kumano once again entered the NTV Junior Tag League, this time with Diamond Ring's Mitsuhiro Kitamiya. The duo won their first match, defeating Jinzo and Rocky Lobo, but lost every other match they were involved in, finishing last in Block B with 1 win and 2 points. Throughout 2014 and 2015, Kumano remained at the lower end of most cards and lost the majority of his matches, commonplace for young Japanese wrestlers as a way of learning respect and earning your opportunities. On June 13, 2015, the 6 year anniversary of NOAH founder Mitsuharu Misawa's death, Kumano once again unsuccessfully challenged for the GHC Junior Heavyweight Tag Team Championship, teaming with Genba Hirayanagi in a loss to Suzuki-gun (Taka Michinoku and El Desperado). In July, Kumano took part in the Global Junior Heavyweight League, finishing last in Block A with zero wins and zero points. In September, Kumano entered the NTV G Cup Junior Heavyweight Tournament for a third time, teaming with Super Crazy and winning only one match, leaving them with two points and unable to advance to the final.

On February 25, 2016, Kumano made his New Japan Pro-Wrestling (NJPW) debut, defeating Hirai Kawato at Lion's Gate Project 1, a show designed to showcase younger talent in Japanese wrestling. He once again competed in NJPW on May 19 at Lion's Gate Project 2, defeating Kaientai Dojo's Ayato Yoshida. On May 28 at Great Voyage, Kumano received his biggest opportunity to date when he faced Yoshinobu Kanemaru for the GHC Junior Heavyweight Championship, but was unable to win. Kumano once again entered the NTV G Cup Junior Tag League, teaming with Andy Dalton. Their only win came on July 30 over Captain Noah and Genba Hirayanagi, leaving them with 1 win and 2 points. On September 1, Kumano lost to Ryusuke Taguchi at Lion's Gate Project 3. On January 24, 2017, Kumano defeated 18 other men and one woman (comedian Kuniko Yamada) in a battle royal. After the match, Kumano stated that 2017 would be a turning point in his career. On March 12, Kumano, for the second time in his career, unsuccessfully challenged for the GHC Junior Heavyweight Championship losing to champion Hajime Ohara. Following the match's conclusion, Ohara stated in a backstage interview that the two would also be joining forces in the tag team division. The following month, Kumano and Ohara's new team was named Back Breakers. Kumano and Ohara participated in the 2017 Global Junior Heavyweight Tag League between July 13 and July 27. The pair had a strong showing with eight points and finished third in the group stage, however were defeated on the final day by MAO and Shunma Katsumata which prevented the team from joining a three-way tie for first place in the group.

On May 4, 2024, Kumano returned to Professional Wrestling when he teamed with Yu Owada and Junta Miyawaki in a losing effort against AKIRA, HAYATA and Eita at Pro Wrestling NOAH Wrestle Magic 2024, ending a four year hiatus from Wrestling.

== Championships and Accomplishments ==
- Pro Wrestling Illustrated
  - PWI ranked him #366 of the 500 best singles wrestlers in the PWI 500 in 2016
- Pro Wrestling Noah
  - GHC Junior Heavyweight Tag Team Championship (1 time) – with Hajime Ohara
  - NTV G+ Cup Junior Heavyweight Tag League Fighting Spirit Award (2014) – with Mitsuhiro Kitamiya
