= Atsushi Aoki =

Japanese professional wrestler (1977–2019)

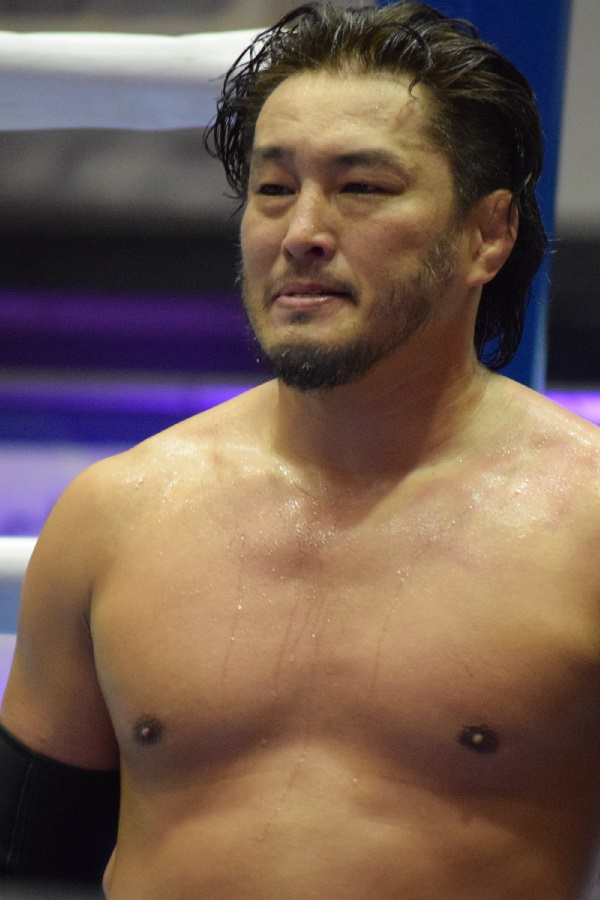
- Aoki in 2017

Personal information
- Born: September 25, 1977 Tokyo, Japan
- Died: June 3, 2019 (aged 41) Tokyo, Japan

Professional wrestling career
- Ring name(s): Atsushi Aoki; Strong Jūsō
- Billed height: 1.70 m (5 ft 7 in)
- Billed weight: 82 kg (181 lb)
- Trained by: Jun Akiyama; Pro Wrestling Noah
- Debut: December 24, 2005

Atsushi Aoki (青木 篤志, Aoki Atsushi; September 25, 1977 – June 3, 2019) was a Japanese professional wrestler who worked for All Japan Pro Wrestling (AJPW) as a wrestler, president of talent relations and head trainer at their dojo.

Aoki began his career in Pro Wrestling Noah in 2005, where he went on to become a two-time winner of the Global Junior Heavyweight Tag League and hold the GHC Junior Heavyweight Tag Team Championship twice during his 7-year run with the promotion. Aoki jumped to All Japan Pro Wrestling (AJPW) in December 2012 where he became the top star of the junior heavyweight division, winning the AJPW World Junior Heavyweight Championship four times and the All Asia Tag Team Championship 3 times.

Aoki was killed in a motorcycle accident on June 3, 2019, at the age of 41. At the time of his death, he was the reigning World Junior Heavyweight Champion.

== Amateur wrestling ==
Aoki began wrestling in high school, winning the 69 kg (152 lb) weight division in 2000. He joined the Japan Ground Self-Defense Force as part of the Aomori 5th General Division Regiment in 2000 where he continued to wrestle, and won the National Open Wrestling Championship in the 69 kg weight class. In 2005, he applied to join the Pro Wrestling Noah dojo and was accepted.

== Professional wrestling career ==
=== Pro Wrestling Noah ===
==== Early career (2005–2009) ====
Aoki began training under Jun Akiyama in the Pro Wrestling Noah Dojo in May 2005. His professional wrestling debut came on December 24, 2005, during NOAH's NOAHful Gift in Differ '05 teaming up with Yoshiniro Ota, losing to NOAH founder Mitsuharu Misawa and Japanese wrestling legend Akira Taue. Aoki spent most of 2006 gaining hard earned experience in the ring, mostly on the losing side of matches. He would also make appearances for other Japanese promotions such as Zero-1 MAX and Dragon Gate. A month later Aoki undertook a "learning excursion" to Europe where he wrestled for such promotions as Real Quality Wrestling and International Pro Wrestling: United Kingdom in the United Kingdom and Westside Xtreme Wrestling in Germany for the two months the excursion lasted. Following his return to NOAH he teamed up with American Rocky Romero to participate in the 2007 Nippon TV Cup Junior Heavyweight Tag League. The team ended up with just two points, winning only one match out of five when the team defeated Bryan Danielson and Davey Richards. On September 3, 2007, Aoki teamed up with Ippei Ota for a match at an AAA / Pro Wrestling Noah co-promoted show called TripleSEM. The team wrestled in the third match of the night and lost to AAA representatives Real Fuerza Aerea (Laredo Kid and Super Fly) in 08:15. In November, 2007 Aoki took part in NOAH's Mauritius Cup tournament, earning 8 points in total by defeating Ippei Ota, Tsutomu Hirayanagi and Akihiko Ito while wrestling to a draw against Shuhei Taniguchi and Taiji Ishimori. Despite not losing a single match in the tournament Shuhei Taniguchi managed to score 9 points to take the Mauritius Cup.

Aoki teamed up with Akihiko Ito to participate in the 2008 Nippon TV Cup Junior Heavyweight Tag League. The team earned only three points, one point more than Aoki's previous Nippon TV Cup league as the team only managed to defeat Kento Miyahara and Naomichi Marufuji and wrestle to a time-limit draw against Eddie Edwards and Ricky Marvin. He was invited to be part of New Japan Pro-Wrestling's (NJPW) 2009 Best of the Super Juniors tournament. Aoki earned eight points, ending in second place in "Block A" with victories over AKIRA, Black Tiger V, Jado and Milano Collection A.T. and only losing to "Block A" winner Prince Devitt (Block winner) and Tiger Mask IV. In the semi-final of the tournament he was defeated by eventual tournament winner Koji Kanemoto. Unlike the 2007 and 2008 version of the Nippon TV Cup Junior Heavyweight Tag League Aoki's 2009 participating alongside Kota Ibushi was much more successful as the team won all three round robin matches, defeating the teams of Kenta and Taiji Ishimori, Genba Hirayanagi and Kikutaro and the team of Bryan Danielson and Roderick Strong. In the semi-final match they defeated Eddie Edwards and Ricky Marvin but lost to Kotaro Suzuki and Yoshinobu Kanemaru in the finals of the tournament. In December, 2009 NJPW invited Aoki back, this time to compete in the 2009 Super J-Cup. Aoki did not make it past the first round as he was defeated by Prince Devitt.

==== Shining Magic 10 Match Series (2007–2010) ====
On December 23, 2007, Aoki took on a "10 match challenge" designed to push him to the limit and earn experience against very experienced wrestlers. The first match was against his mentor Jun Akiyama which he lost. The match series was called the "Shining Magic 10 Match Series" and would stretch out over the next two and a half years. In his second match he defeated Davey Richards, but went on to lose against Kenta, Bryan Danielson, Yoshinari Ogawa and Kaz Hayashi. The Seventh match in the series took place on November 14, 2008, and saw Aoki lose to Yoshinobu Kanemaru. In his eight Shining Magic 10 Match Aoki lost to Junior Heavyweight legend Jyushin Thunder Liger. In his penultimate Sining Magic match Atsushi Aoki lost to Naomich Marufuji on December 6, 2009, almost two years after the 10 Match series begun. His tenth and final match in the Shining Magic 10 Match series took place on February 28, 2010, which saw Aoki lose to Minoru Suzuki ending the series with one victory and nine defeats.

==== Tag team division (2010–2012) ====
On October 30, 2010, Aoki and Kenta defeated Roderick Strong and Eddie Edwards in the finals of a tournament to win the 2010 Nippon TV Cup Junior Heavyweight Tag League. As a result, Aoki and Kenta received a shot at the GHC Junior Heavyweight Tag Team Championship, but were defeated by the champions, New Japan Pro Wrestling representatives Koji Kanemoto and Tiger Mask IV, on November 23, 2010. On December 24, 2010, Aoki and Naomichi Marufuji defeated Kanemoto and Tiger Mask IV to win the GHC Junior Heavyweight Tag Team Championship, Aoki's first title in Noah. Aoki and Marufuji were stripped of the title on April 29, 2011, after Marufuji suffered an injury. On July 30, Aoki and Kotaro Suzuki defeated Kenta and Yoshinobu Kanemaru to win the 2011 NTV G+ Cup Junior Heavyweight Tag League, making both of them two-time winners of the tournament. On October 16, 2011, Aoki and Suzuki defeated Kenta and Kanemaru to win the GHC Junior Heavyweight Tag Team Championship. They lost the title to Ricky Marvin and Super Crazy on July 22, 2012. On December 19, Noah announced that Aoki would be leaving the promotion, after refusing to re-sign following the firing of Kenta Kobashi. In his final match for the promotion on December 24, Aoki was defeated by Mr. Christmas, portrayed by his trainer Jun Akiyama.

=== AAA (2010) ===
On May 23, 2010, Aoki teamed up with Go Shiozaki to defeat the team of Takeshi Morishima and Taiji Ishimori to win the AAA World Tag Team Championship, which was Aoki's first wrestling title. (Note: The AAA Tag team championship is primarily promoted in Mexico but Morishima and Ishimori won the titles during a tour of Mexico and were allowed to defend them in NOAH as well.) At Triplemanía XVIII, Aoki and Shiozaki defended the championship against Beer Money, Inc. (Robert Roode and James Storm), La Hermandad 187 (Nicho el Millonario and Joe Líder) and Los Maniacos (Silver King and Último Gladiador) in a four-way elimination match; they were the first team eliminated when Líder pinned Shiozaki, which meant that they lost the AAA Tag Team championship 14 days after winning it. Los Maniacos (Silver Cain and Último Gladiador) won the match and the championship.

=== All Japan Pro Wrestling (2013–2019) ===
On January 26, 2013, Aoki, Go Shiozaki, Jun Akiyama, Kotaro Suzuki and Yoshinobu Kanemaru, all of whom had quit Noah at the same time, announced that they had joined All Japan Pro Wrestling, forming the "Burning" stable. Aoki and Suzuki received their first shot at the All Asia Tag Team Championship on March 17, but were defeated by the defending champions, Koji Kanemoto and Minoru Tanaka. On April 7, Aoki and Suzuki defeated Hikaru Sato and Hiroshi Yamato to win the 2013 Junior Hyper Tag League and earn another shot at Kanemoto and Tanaka. On April 25, Aoki and Suzuki defeated Kanemoto and Tanaka in a rematch to become the new All Asia Tag Team Champions. On May 11, Aoki made a one night return to Noah to take part in Kenta Kobashi's retirement event, Final Burning in Budokan, during which he and Suzuki defeated Kentaro Shiga and Tamon Honda in a tag team match. On July 5, following a mass exodus led by Keiji Mutoh, it was announced that Aoki, along with the rest of Burning, had signed an exclusive contract with All Japan. On October 29, Aoki and Suzuki quit Burning in order for Suzuki to challenge Kanemaru for the World Junior Heavyweight Championship. On November 21, Aoki and Suzuki, along with Kento Miyahara, joined Go Shiozaki's new Xceed stable. On January 26, 2014, Aoki and Suzuki lost the All Asia Tag Team Championship to former Burning stablemates Jun Akiyama and Yoshinobu Kanemaru. On February 5, Aoki announced he was quitting Xceed to go solo. On May 29, Aoki defeated Último Dragón to become the new World Junior Heavyweight Champion. On July 27, Aoki joined the Evolution stable, after a successful title defense against one of its members, Hikaru Sato. In October, Aoki and Sato won the 2014 Jr. Tag Battle of Glory. On March 27, 2015, Aoki lost the World Junior Heavyweight Championship to Kotaro Suzuki. On October 23, Aoki and Hikaru Sato won their second Jr. Tag Battle of Glory in a row by winning the round-robin tournament with a record of three wins and one loss. On January 1, 2016, Aoki was appointed the president of talent relations. On February 21, 2016, Aoki defeated tag team partner Hikaru Sato in the finals to win the 2016 Jr. Battle of Glory and the vacant World Junior Heavyweight Championship. He went on to lose the title to Sato on June 19. On July 24, Aoki and Sato defeated Isami Kodaka and Yuko Miyamoto to win the All Asia Tag Team Championship. On November 17, Aoki and Sato won their third Jr. Tag Battle of Glory in a row by defeating Soma Takao and Yuma Aoyagi in a playoff match. On November 27, Aoki and Sato lost the All Asia Tag Team Championship to Atsushi Onita and Masanobu Fuchi. Aoki and Sato regained the title from Onita and Fuchi on June 20, 2017. They lost the title to Black Tiger VII and Taka Michinoku on August 27. In early 2018, still using his birth name, Aoki began working under a mask and regained the World Junior Heavyweight Championship from Tajiri on February 3 in Yokohama. Aoki held the title until August, when he dropped it to Koji Iwamoto. In April 2019, Aoki competed in the Champion Carnival once again as a last minute replacement for Kengo Mashimo. Aoki competed in A Block and managed to finish with 8 points, but was unable to advance to the final. Aoki regained the World Junior Heavyweight Championship for the fourth time on May 20, 2019, defeating Iwamoto. His last match took place on June 2, teaming with Hikaru Sato and Yusuke Okada in a loss to Jake Lee, Koji Iwamoto, and Nobe Bryant. At the time of his death, Aoki was scheduled to defend his title against Hikaru Sato on June 18. Despite his death, AJPW announced he would be recognized as champion until November 2019, allowing his 6-month defence clause to expire before crowning a new champion.

== Death ==
On June 3, 2019, Aoki was killed in a motorcycle accident when he collided with the side wall around the expressway of Kitanomaru Park in the Chiyoda ward of Tokyo. He was 41 years old.

In a press conference in the days after the accident, All Japan Pro Wrestling president at the time, Jun Akiyama announced that the World Junior Heavyweight Championship was to be vacated at the end of the title's mandatory defence period, allowing Aoki to reign as de facto champion in honor of his contributions until late 2019, when the title would have been vacated for lack of defences.

== Championships and accomplishments ==
=== Amateur wrestling ===
- Collegiate/High School
  - All Japan National Champion (152lbs)
- Japan Ground Self-Defense Force
  - National Open Wrestling Champion (152lbs)

=== Professional wrestling ===
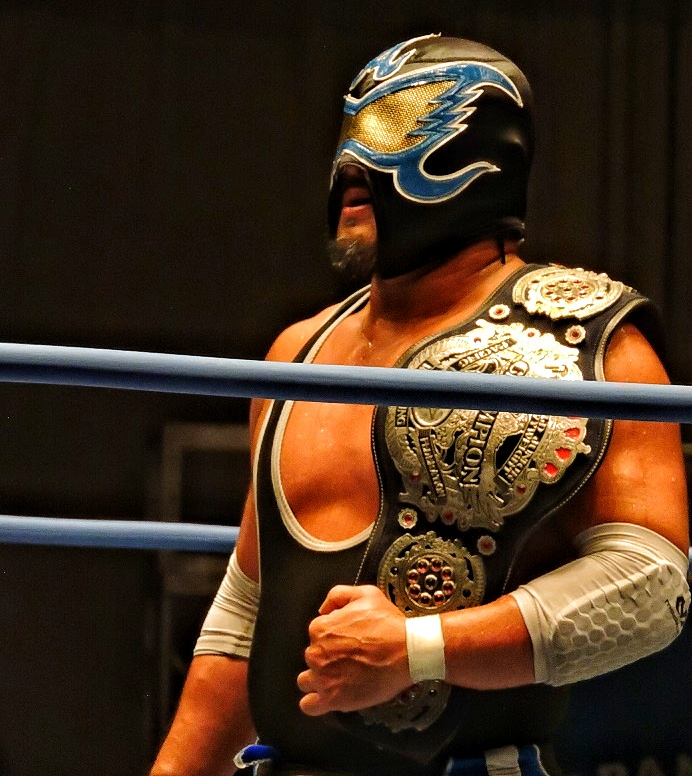
Aoki in 2018, as AJPW World Junior Heavyweight Champion

- AAA
  - AAA World Tag Team Championship (1 time) – with Go Shiozaki
- All Japan Pro Wrestling
  - All Asia Tag Team Championship (3 times) – with Kotaro Suzuki (1) and Hikaru Sato (2)
  - World Junior Heavyweight Championship (4 times)
  - Jr. Battle of Glory (2016)
  - Junior Hyper Tag League (2013) – with Kotaro Suzuki
  - Jr. Tag Battle of Glory (2014, 2015, 2016) – with Hikaru Sato
- Hard Hit
  - Second Grappling Tournament (2014)
- Pro Wrestling Illustrated
  - PWI ranked him #152 of the top 500 singles wrestlers in the PWI 500 in 2016
- Pro Wrestling Noah
  - GHC Junior Heavyweight Tag Team Championship (2 times) – with Naomichi Marufuji (1) and Kotaro Suzuki (1)
  - Nippon TV Cup Junior Heavyweight Tag League (2010) – with KENTA
  - NTV G+ Cup Junior Heavyweight Tag League (2011) – with Kotaro Suzuki
  - VolcanoxSEM Tag Team Tournament (2008) – with Akihiko Ito
- Tokyo Sports
  - Lifetime Achievement Award (2019)
- Wrestling Observer Newsletter
  - Rookie of the Year (2006)

== See also ==
- List of premature professional wrestling deaths
