= Final Burning in Budokan =

2013 professional wrestling event

- Promotional poster for the event, featuring Kenta Kobashi pictured with the Triple Crown Heavyweight Championship belts (left) and the GHC Heavyweight Championship belt (right)
- Promotion: Pro Wrestling Noah
- Date: May 11, 2013
- City: Tokyo, Japan
- Venue: Nippon Budokan
- Attendance: 17,000
- Tagline: Kobashi Kenta Intai Kinen Shiai (小橋建太引退記念試合)

Pay-per-view chronology
← Previous; All Together: Mōikkai, Hitotsu ni Narō ze	Next → —

Final Burning in Budokan was a professional wrestling pay-per-view (PPV) event promoted by Pro Wrestling Noah, which took place on May 11, 2013, at Nippon Budokan in Tokyo, Japan. Headlined by the retirement match of Kenta Kobashi, all in all, the event featured seven matches and wrestlers from not only Noah, but also All Japan Pro Wrestling (AJPW), Diamond Ring, New Japan Pro-Wrestling (NJPW) and Tenryu Project. Due to Kobashi's high-profile status in the history of Japanese professional wrestling, the event gained mainstream attention in the country. Dave Meltzer of the Wrestling Observer Newsletter called the event the "end of an era in Japanese pro wrestling", drawing parallels to Pelé's 1977 retirement from football.

== Production ==
=== Background ===
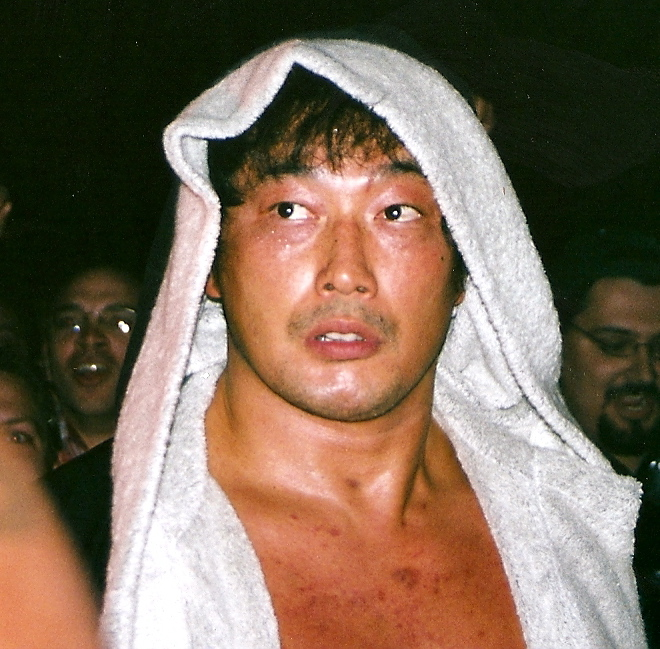
Kenta Kobashi in November 2007

On December 3, 2012, the Tokyo Sports newspaper reported that Pro Wrestling Noah had decided to terminate the contract of veteran wrestler Kenta Kobashi due to financial issues. Kobashi had been with Noah since its inception in 2000 and had been the reigning All Japan Pro Wrestling (AJPW) Triple Crown Heavyweight Champion, when he left AJPW to follow Mitsuharu Misawa to the newly created promotion. Kobashi then became the catalyst in a period, where Noah enjoyed great success with Nippon Budokan sellouts and classic matches. At a time when mixed martial arts was doing strong business in Japan and professional wrestling was seen as the "old fake version", Kobashi's drawing power kept Noah the most popular professional wrestling promotion in the country. However, while the promotion had once been considered one of the best in the world, it had recently fallen on hard times. First Kobashi started suffering from various injuries, which quickly took a toll on Noah's popularity. Kobashi's hard hitting style meant that by the age of 24, his knees were described as being "thrashed" and by the age of 33, he had had more than a dozen operations. Kobashi also battled kidney cancer, which sidelined him for 17 months in early 2006. None of the wrestlers designed to replace Kobashi at the top of Noah had his charisma or drawing power and eventually the promotion lost its network television contract. Following Misawa's death in the ring in 2009, the promotion started to unravel with financial issues and dissension in the front office. Despite not having wrestled in almost a year, Kobashi was the highest paid worker in Noah and by December 2012 the company simply could no longer afford him.

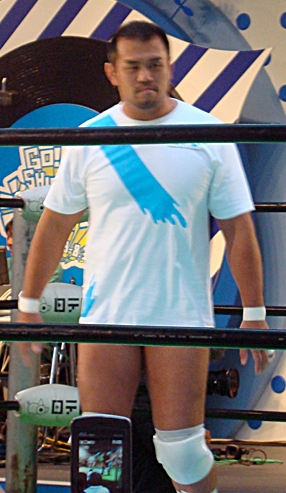
Jun Akiyama was one of five wrestlers to resign from Noah after the company decided to terminate Kobashi's contract.

Noah's decision to cut Kobashi led to an immediate backlash from wrestlers loyal to him with Atsushi Aoki, Go Shiozaki, Jun Akiyama, Kotaro Suzuki and Yoshinobu Kanemaru announcing their resignation from the promotion. The five ended up joining AJPW after their contracts with Noah expired at the end of the year, forming a new version of the Burning stable, which had originally been formed by Kobashi and Akiyama in 1998.

On December 9, 2012, Kobashi appeared at Noah's Ryōgoku Kokugikan event, announcing his retirement from professional wrestling, having deemed it impossible to fully recover from the accumulation of his injuries. Stating that he wanted to wrestle one final match, Kobashi added that he was not being forced to retire. Originally Kobashi planned to have his retirement match on February 26, 2013, which would have been the 25th anniversary of his debut, but quickly realized he needed more time to get into ring shape, which led to the date being pushed back to May 11, 2013. The date was confirmed on January 23, and on March 31, it was announced that Kobashi's retirement match would be an eight-man tag team match, where he, Jun Akiyama, Keiji Mutoh and Kensuke Sasaki would take on Go Shiozaki, Kenta, Maybach Taniguchi and Yoshinobu Kanemaru. Out of his partners, Kobashi was particularly close to Akiyama, with the history between the two dating back 20 years to their junior days in AJPW. The entire team opposing Kobashi was made up of his protégés. Tokyo's Nippon Budokan was chosen as the arena for the show. Despite Noah's recent difficulties, it was considered a "given" that the promotion could sell out Nippon Budokan for the show, while Tokyo Dome was deemed "too big of a risk". Kobashi also had significant history with Nippon Budokan. Big matches in his early career as well as his tag team tournament and Triple Crown Heavyweight Championship wins had taken place in the arena and during his two-year run as the GHC Heavyweight Champion, Noah held its big shows in the arena.

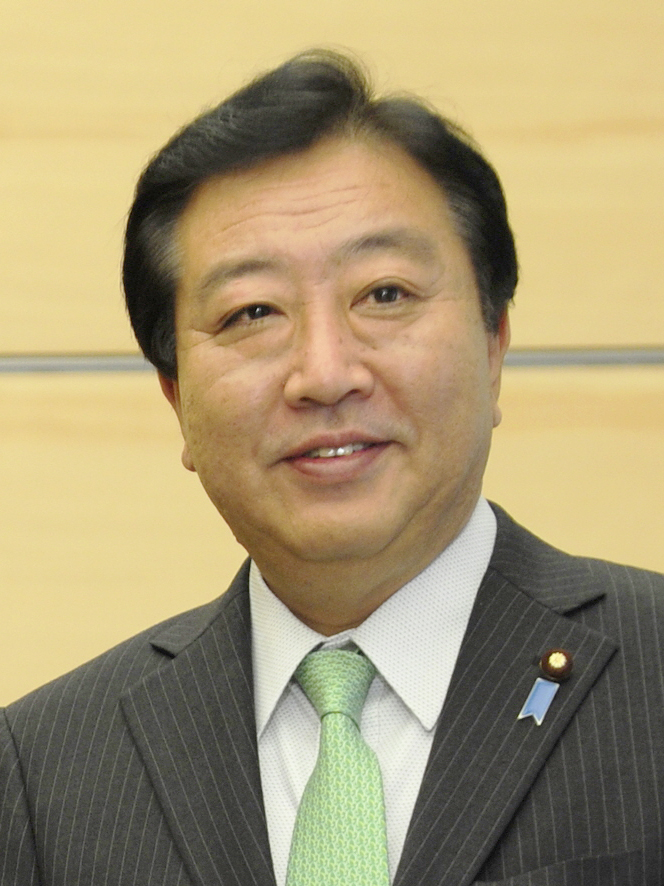
Yoshihiko Noda, the former Prime Minister of Japan and a self-professed fan of Kobashi, attended the event.

Kobashi's retirement event received significant coverage in mainstream media in Japan. Several magazines ran special editions dedicated entirely to Kobashi. The event was streamed into movie theaters across Japan. Every theater in Tokyo was sold out, most well ahead of time. Japan's former prime minister Yoshihiko Noda, who had stated that Kobashi was his favorite wrestler, announced that he would attend the event.

Kobashi trained for the match at the Pro Wrestling Noah dojo, where he had trained since the promotion's founding in 2000. He would enter his final match weighing 105 kg (231 lb). This would mark his first match in 455 days.

== Event ==
The show was opened by an appearance by Hayabusa, who had been paralyzed in the ring in 2001. With help from crutches, he walked to the ring and talked about taking a lariat from Kobashi in Nippon Budokan.

In the opening match of the show, Masanobu Fuchi defeated Hitoshi Kumano with the backdrop. Fuchi was one of Kobashi's original trainers and the match was designed to show him now, a generation later, training the recently debuted Kumano.

In the second match, Atsushi Kotoge and Taiji Ishimori took on Genba Hirayanagi and Suwa. During the match, former prime minister Yoshihiko Noda, who was seated in the front row, took part in a spot, where Hirayanagi recreated a spit spot made famous by Haruka Eigen. During the match, Suwa suffered a spinal injury and was stretchered out of the arena, after Ishimori pinned Hirayanagi with the 450° splash to end the match.

The third match featured Atsushi Aoki and Kotaro Suzuki facing Kentaro Shiga and Tamon Honda. Aoki and Suzuki had quit Noah in protest over Kobashi's treatment and were now representing AJPW. Honda was Kobashi's training partner for years and at one point his regular tag team partner. The match was billed as "Burning vs. Burning", with Aoki and Suzuki being part of the new Burning stable in AJPW, while Shiga and Honda had been part of the earlier version of the group. Aoki and Suzuki won the match with Suzuki pinning Shiga for the win with the Endless Waltz.

After the third match, Kobashi came out to the ring for his retirement ceremony, which was also attended by wrestlers Akira Taue, Hiroshi Hase, Masahiro Chono, Masanobu Fuchi, Mitsuo Momota, Takeshi Rikio and Toshiaki Kawada as well as Asuka Kuramochi from AKB48 and Yoshihiko Noda among others. The ceremony also included a written statement from John Laurinaitis, Kobashi's on-and-off tag team partner in the 90s, and a pre-taped promo from Stan Hansen.

The fourth match of the show saw Genichiro Tenryu and Yoshinari Ogawa defeat Masao Inoue and Takeshi Morishima.

The fifth match featured the New Japan Pro-Wrestling (NJPW) trio of Hiroshi Tanahashi, Satoshi Kojima and Yuji Nagata taking on the Noah trio of Akitoshi Saito, Muhammad Yone and Takashi Sugiura. The NJPW wrestlers, Tanahashi in particular, were booed by the Noah crowd. Tanahashi won the match for his team by pinning Saito with the High Fly Flow.

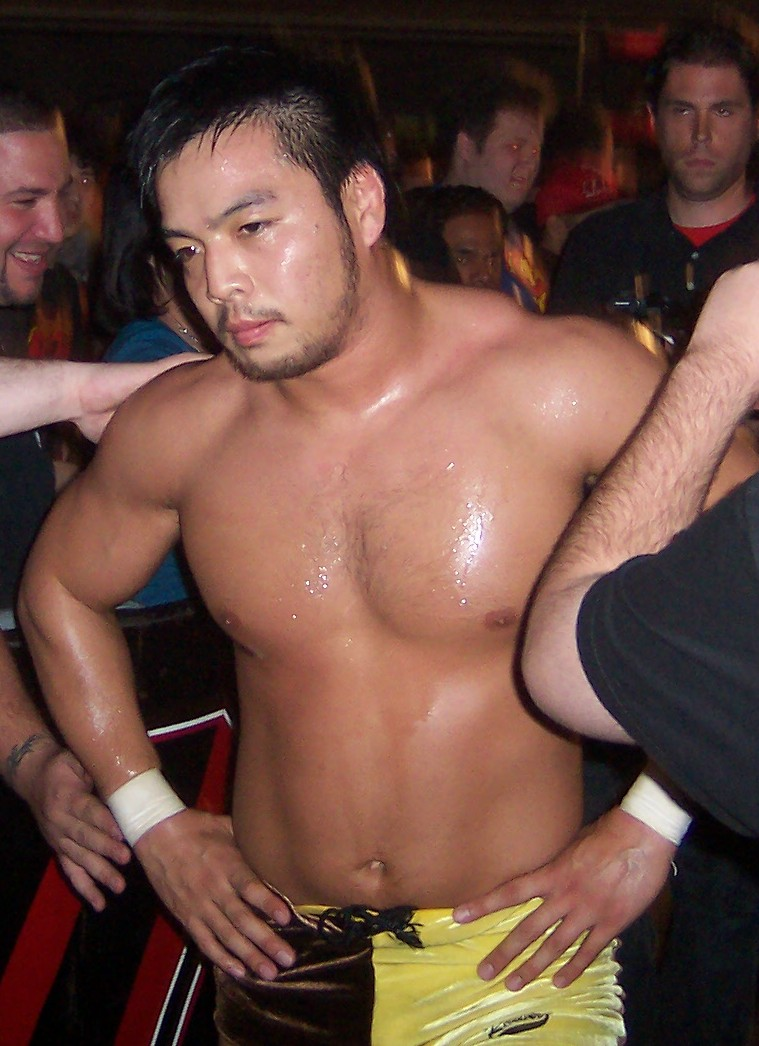
Kobashi's protégé Kenta, the reigning GHC Heavyweight Champion, took part in the main event.

The sixth match featured the reunion of No Fear as Takao Omori and Yoshihiro Takayama, who had teamed together in both AJPW and Noah, took on Minoru Suzuki and Naomichi Marufuji. No Fear won the match with Takayama pinning Marufuji with the Everest German Suplex Hold. The main event of the show was the retirement match of Kenta Kobashi, where he teamed with Jun Akiyama, Keiji Mutoh and Kensuke Sasaki to take on Go Shiozaki, Kenta, Maybach Taniguchi and Yoshinobu Kanemaru. Kobashi came to the ring wearing an old version of the GHC Heavyweight Championship belt. He had not actually held the title since 2005, but was considered both the greatest champion in the title's history as well as the man most synonymous with the title, nicknamed the "Absolute Champion" (絶対王者, zettai ōja). The match featured Kobashi doing several of his signature moves, including the Cobra Twist, half nelson suplex, rolling cradle and 187 chops. At the end, he hit Kanemaru with a superplex and a lariat, but his pin attempt was broken up by Kanemaru's partners. Akiyama then hit Taniguchi with an exploder suplex and Sasaki hit a German suplex on Kenta, while Mutoh hit a backbreaker and a moonsault on Kanemaru. Akiyama, Mutoh and Sasaki then all signaled for Kobashi, who hit a body slam on Kanemaru and then climbed the ropes for the final moonsault of his career, which won the match for his team.

After the conclusion of the match, the ring and ringside area were filled with wrestlers. Kobashi's wife and mother also came to the ring for his retirement speech. After a ten-bell salute to signal the end of Kobashi's career, his greatest accomplishments were read out loud after which the event concluded with his theme song "Grand Sword" being played in Nippon Budokan.

== Aftermath ==
In June 2014, Kobashi started producing his own independent events under the banner of "Fortune Dream". In addition to putting together the cards, featuring wrestlers from multiple promotions, Kobashi would participate in the shows in sit-down interview segments with fellow veteran wrestlers, including Genichiro Tenryu and Riki Choshu.

By the end of 2015, Go Shiozaki, Kotaro Suzuki and Yoshinobu Kanemaru, three of the five wrestlers who had quit Noah in protest, had quit AJPW. Shiozaki and Kanemaru quickly returned to Noah, with Shiozaki re-signing with the promotion in June 2016. Akiyama and Aoki remain in AJPW, with Akiyama having taken over as the promotion's president in July 2014.

Kensuke Sasaki, one of the veteran wrestlers who had teamed with Kobashi in the main event of the show, announced his retirement on February 13, 2014. Unlike Kobashi, Sasaki decided against doing a retirement match, with his final match having already taken place two days earlier.

== Results ==
No.	Results	Stipulations	Times
1	Masanobu Fuchi defeated Hitoshi Kumano	Singles match	06:21
2	Brave (Atsushi Kotoge and Taiji Ishimori) defeated No Mercy (Genba Hirayanagi and Suwa)	Tag team match	08:45
3	Burning (Atsushi Aoki and Kotaro Suzuki) defeated Burning (Kentaro Shiga and Tamon Honda)	Tag team match	11:29
4	Revolution (Genichiro Tenryu and Yoshinari Ogawa) defeated Js Spirits (Masao Inoue and Takeshi Morishima)	Tag team match	08:38
5	Hiroshi Tanahashi, Satoshi Kojima and Yuji Nagata defeated Akitoshi Saito, Muhammad Yone and Takashi Sugiura	Six-man tag team match	14:23
6	No Fear (Takao Omori and Yoshihiro Takayama) defeated Minoru Suzuki and Naomichi Marufuji	Tag team match	18:26
7	Jun Akiyama, Keiji Mutoh, Kensuke Sasaki and Kenta Kobashi defeated Go Shiozaki, Kenta, Maybach Taniguchi and Yoshinobu Kanemaru	Eight-man tag team match	39:59

== See also ==
- Kenta Kobashi
- Burning
