= Global Junior Heavyweight Tag League =

Professional wrestling tournament

The Global Junior Heavyweight Tag League is an annual professional wrestling round-robin tag team tournament held by Pro Wrestling Noah since 2007. Originally known as the Nippon TV Cup Jr. Heavyweight Tag League and from 2011 until 2017 as the NTV G+ Cup Junior Heavyweight Tag League, the tournament was given its current name in May 2017. After a hiatus in 2020, the tournament was brought back in 2021, with a switch in focus from tag teams, to teams of 4.

The Global Junior Heavyweight Tag League is held under a round-robin system, with two points for a win, one for a draw and none for a loss. The teams finishing atop the points standings in the two blocks advance to the knockout stage, where the winner is determined in a head-to-head match. Matches in the Global Junior Heavyweight Tag League have a 30-minute time limit, which is the same as matches for Noah's GHC Junior Heavyweight Tag Team Championship.

In the below results, (C) signifies the GHC Jr Tag Team Champions at the time of each tournament. Usually the winners of the tournament earn a shot at the title, assuming they are not already the champions.

== List of winners ==
Nippon TV Cup Jr. Heavyweight Tag League

- 2007: Kenta and Taiji Ishimori
- 2008: Kenta and Taiji Ishimori (2)
- 2009: Kotaro Suzuki and Yoshinobu Kanemaru
- 2010: Atsushi Aoki and Kenta

NTV G+ Cup Jr. Heavyweight Tag League

- 2011: Atsushi Aoki and Kotaro Suzuki
- 2012: Atsushi Kotoge and Taiji Ishimori
- 2013: Jushin Thunder Liger and Tiger Mask
- 2014: Hajime Ohara and Kenoh
- 2015: Atsushi Kotoge and Daisuke Harada
- 2016: ACH and Taiji Ishimori

Global Jr. Heavyweight Tag League

- 2017: Hayata and Yo-Hey
- 2018: Hayata and Yo-Hey (2)
- 2019: Kotaro Suzuki and Yoshinari Ogawa

Jr. Team Game

- 2021: Tadasuke, Alejandro, Haoh & Nioh

N Innovation U-Cup

- 2022: Daisuke Harada, Atsushi Kotoge, Hajime Ohara & Junta Miyawaki

Jr. Tag League

- 2025: Amakusa & Junta Miyawaki
- 2026: Dragon Bane & Alejandro

== Results ==
=== 2007 ===
The 2007 Nippon TV Cup Junior Heavyweight Tag League was held from July 1 to 15, 2007. The tournament featured six teams. Outside entrants included Bryan Danielson and Davey Richards from Ring of Honor.

Final standings
Kenta and Taiji Ishimori	7
Jay Briscoe and Mark Briscoe	6
Kota Ibushi and Naomichi Marufuji	6
Kotaro Suzuki and Ricky Marvin (c)	6
Bryan Danielson and Davey Richards	3
Atsushi Aoki and Rocky Romero	2

Results	Aoki Romero	Danielson Richards	Jay Mark	Kenta Ishimori	Ibushi Marufuji	Suzuki Marvin
Aoki Romero	X	Aoki; Romero (19:37)	Jay; Mark (11:33)	Kenta; Ishimori (20:26)	Ibushi; Marufuji (18:26)	Suzuki; Marvin (16:05)
Danielson Richards	Aoki; Romero (19:37)	X	Jay; Mark (16:45)	Draw (30:00)	Ibushi; Marufuji (21:27)	Danielson; Richards (22:45)
Jay Mark	Jay; Mark (11:33)	Ibushi; Marufuji (16:52)	X	Draw (30:00)	Draw (30:00)	Draw (30:00)
Kenta Ishimori	Kenta; Ishimori (20:26)	Draw (30:00)	Draw (30:00)	X	Kenta; Ishimori (21:43)	Draw (30:00)
Ibushi Marufuji	Ibushi; Marufuji (18:26)	Ibushi; Marufuji (21:27)	Ibushi; Marufuji (16:52)	Kenta; Ishimori (21:43)	X	Suzuki; Marvin (19:44)
Suzuki Marvin	Suzuki; Marvin (16:05)	Danielson; Richards (22:45)	Draw (30:00)	Draw (30:00)	Suzuki; Marvin (19:44)	X

=== 2008 ===
The 2008 Nippon TV Cup Junior Heavyweight Tag League was held from August 23 to September 6, 2008. The tournament featured eight teams. Outside entrants included Bryan Danielson, Davey Richards and Jay and Mark Briscoe from Ring of Honor.

Final standings
Kenta and Taiji Ishimori	10
Kotaro Suzuki and Yoshinobu Kanemaru (c)	10
Bryan Danielson and Davey Richards	9
Jay Briscoe and Mark Briscoe	9
Katsuhiko Nakajima and Kota Ibushi	8
Eddie Edwards and Ricky Marvin	5
Akihito Ito and Atsushi Aoki	2
Kento Miyahara and Naomichi Marufuji	2

Results	Ito Aoki	Danielson Richards	Edwards Marvin	Jay Mark	Nakajima Ibushi	Kenta Ishimori	Miyahara Marufuji	Suzuki Kanemaru
Ito Aoki	X	Danielson; Richards (15:58)	Draw (30:00)	Jay; Mark (13:57)	Nakajima; Ibushi (6:44)	Kenta; Ishimori (10:46)	Ito; Aoki (14:28)	Suzuki; Kanemaru (12:29)
Danielson Richards	Danielson; Richards (15:58)	X	Danielson; Richards (10:02)	Danielson; Richards (15:55)	Nakajima; Ibushi (10:30)	Kenta; Ishimori (12:31)	Danielson; Richards (9:40)	Draw (30:00)
Edwards Marvin	Draw (30:00)	Danielson; Richards (10:02)	X	Edwards; Marvin	Nakajima; Ibushi (14:09)	Kenta; Ishimori (17:08)	Edwards; Marvin (15:37)	Suzuki; Kanemaru (11:59)
Jay Mark	Jay; Mark (13:57)	Danielson; Richards (15:55)	Edwards; Marvin	X	Jay; Mark (16:01)	Jay; Mark (9:04)	Jay; Mark (11:21)	Draw (30:00)
Nakajima Ibushi	Nakajima; Ibushi (6:44)	Nakajima; Ibushi (10:30)	Nakajima; Ibushi (14:09)	Jay; Mark (16:01)	X	Nakajima; Ibushi (29:40)	Miyahara; Marufuji (16:10)	Suzuki; Kanemaru (19:56)
Kenta Ishimori	Kenta; Ishimori (10:46)	Kenta; Ishimori (12:31)	Kenta; Ishimori (17:08)	Jay; Mark (9:04)	Nakajima; Ibushi (29:40)	X	Kenta; Ishimori (12:53)	Kenta; Ishimori (19:59)
Miyahara Marufuji	Ito; Aoki (14:28)	Danielson; Richards (9:40)	Edwards; Marvin (15:37)	Jay; Mark (11:21)	Miyahara; Marufuji (16:10)	Kenta; Ishimori (12:53)	X	Suzuki; Kanemaru (13:28)
Suzuki Kanemaru	Suzuki; Kanemaru (12:29)	Draw (30:00)	Suzuki; Kanemaru (11:59)	Draw (30:00)	Suzuki; Kanemaru (19:56)	Kenta; Ishimori (19:59)	Suzuki; Kanemaru (13:28)	X

Finals
1	Kenta and Taiji Ishimori	Pin
2	Kotaro Suzuki and Yoshinobu Kanemaru	12:32

=== 2009 ===
The 2009 Nippon TV Cup Junior Heavyweight Tag League ran from July 12 to 27, 2009. The tournament featured two blocks of four teams each. Outside entrants included Bryan Danielson and Roderick Strong from Ring of Honor.

Final standings
Block A		Block B	
Atsushi Aoki and Kota Ibushi	6	Kotaro Suzuki and Yoshinobu Kanemaru (c)	5
Kenta and Taiji Ishimori	4	Eddie Edwards and Ricky Marvin	4
Bryan Danielson and Roderick Strong	2	Katsuhiko Nakajima and Kento Miyahara	3
Genba Hirayanagi and Kikutaro	0	Akihiko Ito and Tsuyoshi Kikuchi	0

Block A	Aoki Ibushi	Danielson Strong	Hirayanagi Kikutaro	Ishimori Kenta
Aoki Ibushi	X	Ibushi; Aoki (21:11)	Ibushi; Aoki (10:22)	Ibushi; Aoki (20:52)
Danielson Strong	Ibushi; Aoki (21:11)	X	Danielson; Strong (14:24)	Ishimori; Kenta (21:32)
Hirayanagi Kikutaro	Ibushi; Aoki (21:11)	Ishimori; Kenta (21:32)	X	Ishimori; Kenta (10:57)
Ishimori Kenta	Ibushi; Aoki (21:11)	Ishimori; Kenta (21:32)	Ishimori; Kenta (10:57)	X
Block B	Suzuki Kanemaru	Edwards Marvin	Nakajima Miyahara	Ito Kikuchi
Ito Kikuchi	X	Edwards; Marvin (11:44)	Nakajima; Miyahara (11:39)	Suzuki; Kanemaru (16:18)
Edwards Marvin	Edwards; Marvin (14:44)	X	Edwards; Marvin (14:38)	Suzuki; Kanemaru (17:26)
Nakajima Miyahara	Nakajima; Miyahara (11:39)	Edwards; Marvin (14:38)	X	Draw (30:00)
Suzuki Kanemaru	Suzuki; Kanemaru (16:18)	Suzuki; Kanemaru (14:38)	Draw (30:00)	X

Semifinals
A1	Atsushi Aoki and Kota Ibushi	Pin
B2	Eddie Edwards and Ricky Marvin	13:39
B1	Kotaro Suzuki and Yoshinobu Kanemaru	Pin
A2	Kenta and Taiji Ishimori	19:28

Final
A1	Atsushi Aoki and Kota Ibushi	Pin
B1	Kotaro Suzuki and Yoshinobu Kanemaru	19:49

=== 2010 ===
The 2010 Nippon TV Cup Junior Heavyweight Tag League held from October 15 to October 30, 2010. The tournament featured two blocks of five teams each. Outside entrants included Bryan Danielson and Davey Richards from Ring of Honor, Dick Togo and Yasu Urano from Dramatic Dream Team, The Great Sasuke and Kenbai from Michinoku Pro Wrestling, Atsushi Kotoge and Daisuke Harada from Osaka Pro Wrestling and Extreme Tiger and Jack Evans from AAA.

Final standings
Block A		Block B	
Atsushi Aoki and Kenta	6	Kotaro Suzuki and Yoshinari Ogawa	6
Eddie Edwards and Roderick Strong	5	Extreme Tiger and Jack Evans	5
Ricky Marvin and Taiji Ishimori	4	Genba Hirayanagi and Yoshinobu Kanemaru	3
Katsuhiko Nakajima and Satoshi Kajiwara	3	Atsushi Kotoge and Daisuke Harada	2
The Great Sasuke and Kenbai	2	Dick Togo and Yasu Urano	2

Block A	Aoki Kenta	Edwards Strong	Sasuke Kenbai	Nakajima Kajiwara	Marvin Ishimori
Aoki Kenta	X	Edwards; Strong (27:53)	Aoki; Kenta (18:48)	Aoki; Kenta (21:38)	Aoki; Kenta (16:18)
Edwards Strong	Edwards; Strong (27:53)	X	Sasuke; Kenbai (13:41)	Edwards; Strong (13:06)	Draw (30:00)
Sasuke Kenbai	Aoki; Kenta (18:48)	Sasuke; Kenbai (13:41)	X	Nakajima; Kajiwara (17:49)	Marvin; Ishimori (13:41)
Nakajima Kajiwara	Aoki; Kenta (21:38)	Edwards; Strong (13:06)	Nakajima; Kajiwara (17:49)	X	Draw (30:00)
Marvin Ishimori	Aoki; Kenta (16:18)	Draw (30:00)	Marvin; Ishimori (13:41)	Draw (30:00)	X
Block B	Kotoge Harada	Togo Urano	Tiger Evans	Hirayanagi Kanemaru	Suzuki Ogawa
Kotoge Harada	X	Togo; Urano (15:29)	Tiger; Evans (12:41)	Kotoge; Harada (17:21)	Suzuki; Ogawa (14:10)
Togo Urano	Togo; Urano (15:29)	X	Tiger; Evans (15:35)	Hirayanagi; Kanemaru (14:25)	Togo; Urano (12:24)
Tiger Evans	Tiger; Evans (12:41)	Tiger; Evans (15:35)	X	Draw (30:00)	Suzuki; Ogawa (15:05)
Hirayanagi Kanemaru	Kotoge; Harada (17:21)	Hirayanagi; Kanemaru (14:25)	Draw (30:00)	X	Hirayanagi; Kanemaru (20:12)
Suzuki Ogawa	Suzuki; Ogawa (14:10)	Togo; Urano (12:24)	Suzuki; Ogawa (15:05)	Hirayanagi; Kanemaru (20:12)	X

Semifinals
A1	Atsushi Aoki and Kenta	Pin
B2	Extreme Tiger and Jack Evans	10:17
B1	Kotaro Suzuki and Yoshinari Ogawa	Pin
A2	Eddie Edwards and Roderick Strong	10:45

Finals
A1	Atsushi Aoki and Kenta	Pin
A2	Eddie Edwards and Roderick Strong	18:53

=== 2011 ===
The 2011 NTV G+ Cup Junior Heavyweight Tag League was held from July 16 to 30, 2011. The tournament featured two blocks of five teams each. Outside entrants included Delirious and Eddie Edwards from Ring of Honor, Osamu Namiguchi and Tatsuhito Takaiwa from Pro Wrestling Zero1, Kenoh and Kenbai from Michinoku Pro Wrestling, Aero Star and Jack Evans from AAA and Atsushi Kotoge and Daisuke Harada from Osaka Pro Wrestling.

Final standings
Block A		Block B	
Kenta and Yoshinobu Kanemaru (c)	6	Atsushi Aoki and Kotaro Suzuki	6
Kenbai and Kenoh	4	Atsushi Kotoge and Daisuke Harada	4
Aero Star and Jack Evans	4	Delirious and Eddie Edwards	4
Taishi Takizawa and Zack Sabre Jr.	4	Katsuhiko Nakajima and Satoshi Kajiwara	4
Osamu Namiguchi and Tatsuhito Takaiwa	2	Ricky Marvin and Rocky Marvin	2

Block A	Evans Star	Kenoh Kenbai	Kenta Kanemaru	Takizawa Sabre Jr.	Takaiwa Namiguchi
Star Evans	X	Star; Evans (12:16)	Kenta; Kanemaru (12:58)	Star; Evans (13:07)	Takizawa; Sabre Jr (13:39)
Kenbai Kenoh	Star; Evans (12:16)	X	Kenbai; Kenoh (22:17)	Kenbai; Kenoh (13:37)	Takizawa; Sabre Jr (17:30)
Kenta Kanemaru	Kenta; Kanemaru (12:58)	Kenbai; Kenoh (22:17)	X	Kenta; Kanemaru (15:09)	Kenta; Kanemaru (20:20)
Takizawa Sabre Jr.	Takizawa; Sabre Jr (13:39)	Takizawa; Sabre Jr (17:30)	Kenta; Kanemaru (20:20)	X	Namiguchi; Takaiwa (16:30)
Namiguchi Takaiwa	Star; Evans (13:07)	Kenbai; Kenoh (13:37)	Kenta; Kanemaru (15:09)	Namiguchi; Takaiwa (16:30)	X
Block B	Aoki Suzuki	Kotoge Harada	Delirious Edwards	Nakajima Kajiwara	Ricky Rocky
Aoki Suzuki	X	Aoki; Suzuki (17:42)	Aoki; Suzuki (19:15)	Nakajima; Kajiwara (18:50)	Aoki; Suzuki (17:12)
Kotoge Harada	Aoki; Suzuki (17:42)	X	Kotoge; Harada (20:31)	Nakajima; Kajiwara (18:13)	Kotoge; Harada (13:45)
Edwards Delirious	Aoki; Suzuki (19:15)	Kotoge; Harada (20:31)	X	Delirious; Edwards (15:03)	Delirious; Edwards (19:43)
Nakajima Kajiwara	Nakajima; Kajiwara (18:50)	Nakajima; Kajiwara (18:13)	Delirious; Edwards (15:03)	X	Ricky; Rocky (14:42)
Ricky Rocky	Aoki; Suzuki (17:12)	Kotoge; Harada (13:45)	Delirious; Edwards (19:43)	Ricky; Rocky (14:42)	X

Final
A1	Kenta and Yoshinobu Kanemaru	Pin
B1	Atsushi Aoki and Kotaro Suzuki	30:03

=== 2012 ===
The 2012 NTV G+ Cup Junior Heavyweight Tag League was held from September 8 to September 22, 2012. The tournament featured two blocks of five teams each. Outside entrants included Bobby Fish and Eddie Edwards from Ring of Honor, Hiro Tonai and Shiori Asahi from Kaientai Dojo and Daichi Hashimoto and Ikuto Hidaka from Pro Wrestling Zero1.

Final standings
Block A		Block B	
Atsushi Kotoge and Taiji Ishimori	6	Daichi Hashimoto and Ikuto Hidaka	6
Atsushi Aoki and Kotaro Suzuki	4	Katsuhiko Nakajima and Satoshi Kajiwara	5
Bobby Fish and Eddie Edwards	4	Ricky Marvin and Super Crazy (c)	5
Hiro Tonai and Shiori Asahi	4	Genba Hirayanagi and Yoshinobu Kanemaru	4
Gastón Mateo and Kaiser	2	Paul London and Zack Sabre Jr.	2

Block A	Aoki Suzuki	Kotoge Ishimori	Fish Edwards	Tonai Asahi	Mateo Kaiser
Aoki Suzuki	X	Kotoge; Ishimori (11:59)	Fish; Edwards (19:27)	Aoki; Suzuki (14:19)	Aoki; Suzuki (17:58)
Kotoge Ishimori	Kotoge; Ishimori (11:59)	X	Kotoge; Ishimori (12:49)	Tonai; Asahi (12:49)	Kotoge; Ishimori (8:44)
Fish Edwards	Fish; Edwards (19:27)	Kotoge; Ishimori (12:49)	X	Tonai; Asahi (7:58)	Edwards; Fish (13:58)
Tonai Asahi	Aoki; Suzuki (14:19)	Tonai; Asahi (12:49)	Tonai; Asahi (7:58)	X	Mateo; Kaiser (9:47)
Mateo Kaiser	Aoki; Suzuki (17:58)	Kotoge; Ishimori (8:44)	Edwards; Fish (13:58)	Mateo; Kaiser (9:47)	X
Block B	Hashimoto Hidaka	Hirayanagi Kanemaru	Nakajima Kajiwara	London Sabre Jr.	Marvin Crazy
Hashimoto Hidaka	X	Hashimoto; Hidaka (18:19)	Nakajima; Kajiwara (21:25)	Hashimoto; Hidaka (16:33)	Hashimoto; Hidaka (13:45)
Hirayanagi Kanemaru	Hashimoto; Hidaka (18:19)	X	Hirayanagi; Kanemaru (8:01)	London; Sabre Jr (8:01)	Marvin; Crazy (7:55)
Nakajima Kajiwara	Nakajima; Kajiwara (18:13)	Hirayanagi; Kanemaru (8:01)	X	Nakajima; Kajiwara (6:52)	Draw (30:00)
London Sabre Jr.	Hashimoto; Hidaka (16:33)	London; Sabre Jr (6:52)	Nakajima; Kajiwara (6:52)	X	Draw (30:00)
Marvin Crazy	Hashimoto; Hidaka (13:45)	Marvin; Crazy (7:55)	Draw (30:00)	Draw (30:00)	X

Final
A1	Atsushi Kotoge and Taiji Ishimori	Pin
B1	Daichi Hashimoto and Ikuto Hidaka	13:52

=== 2013 ===
The 2013 NTV G+ Cup Junior Heavyweight Tag League was held from July 14 to 28, 2013. The tournament featured two blocks of five teams each.outside entrants included Roderick Strong from Ring of Honor, Hiro Tonai and Shiori Asahi from Kaientai Dojo, Jushin Thunder Liger and Tiger Mask from New Japan Pro-Wrestling and Australian wrestler Slex. The winners, Jushin Thunder Liger and Tiger Mask, also won the vacant GHC Junior Heavyweight Tag Team Championship.

Final standings
Block A		Block B	
Atsushi Kotoge and Taiji Ishimori	6	Jushin Thunder Liger and Tiger Mask	6
Ricky Marvin and Super Crazy	6	Yoshinari Ogawa and Zack Sabre Jr.	6
Genba Hirayanagi and Maybach Suwa Jr.	4	Hiro Tonai and Shiori Asahi	2
Dual Force and Pesadilla	2	Roderick Strong and Slex	2
Gastón Mateo and Kaiser	2	Daisuke Harada and Hitoshi Kumano	0

Block A	Kotoge Ishimori	Dual Force Pesadilla	Mateo Kaiser	Hirayanagi Suwa Jr.	Marvin Crazy
Kotoge Ishimori	X	Kotoge; Ishimori (11:07)	Kotoge; Ishimori (11:35)	Hirayanagi; Suwa Jr (15:10)	Kotoge; Ishimori (16:44)
Dual Force Pesadilla	Kotoge; Ishimori (11:07)	X	Draw (30:00)	Dual Force; Pesadilla (12:34)	Marvin; Crazy (8:42)
Mateo Kaiser	Kotoge; Ishimori (11:35)	Draw (30:00)	X	Hirayanagi; Suwa Jr (7:01)	Marvin; Crazy (12:20)
Hirayanagi Suwa Jr.	Hirayanagi; Suwa Jr (15:10)	Dual Force; Pesadilla (12:34)	Hirayanagi; Suwa Jr (7:01)	X	Marvin; Crazy (15:55)
Marvin Crazy	Kotoge; Ishimori (16:44)	Marvin; Crazy (8:42)	Marvin; Crazy (12:20)	Marvin; Crazy (15:55)	X
Block B	Harada Kumano	Tonai Asahi	Liger Tiger Mask	Strong Slex	Ogawa Sabre Jr.
Harada Kumano	X	Tonai; Ashai (8:26)	Liger; Tiger Mask (11:04)	Strong; Slex (14:17)	Ogawa; Sabre Jr (19:20)
Tonai Asahi	Tonai; Ashai (8:26)	X	Liger; Tiger Mask (10:27)	Tonai; Ashai (8:08)	Ogawa; Sabre Jr (12:50)
Liger Tiger Mask	Liger; Tiger Mask (11:04)	Liger; Tiger Mask (10:27)	X	Liger; Tiger Mask (9:48)	Double Count Out (2:02)
Strong Slex	Strong; Slex (14:17)	Tonai; Ashai (8:08)	Liger; Tiger Mask (9:48)	X	Ogawa; Sabre Jr (16:04)
Ogawa Sabre Jr.	Ogawa; Sabre Jr (19:20)	Ogawa; Sabre Jr (12:50)	Double Count Out (2:02)	Ogawa; Sabre Jr (16:04)	X

Final
A1	Atsushi Kotoge and Taiji Ishimori	Pin
B1	Jushin Thunder Liger and Tiger Mask	13:52

=== 2014 ===
The 2014 NTV G+ Cup Junior Heavyweight Tag League was held from July 19 to August 2, 2014. The tournament featured two blocks of five teams each. Outside entrants included Jushin Thunder Liger and Tiger Mask from New Japan Pro-Wrestling, Hiro Tonai and Shiori Asahi from Kaientai Dojo and Mexican wrestlers Jinzo and Rocky Lobo.

Final standings
Block A		Block B	
Hajime Ohara and Kenoh	6	Daisuke Harada and Quiet Storm	6
Jushin Thunder Liger and Tiger Mask	6	Atsushi Kotoge and Taiji Ishimori (c)	6
Matt Striker and Super Crazy	4	Hiro Tonai and Shiori Asahi	4
Yoshinari Ogawa and Zack Sabre Jr.	4	Hitoshi Kumano and Mitsuhiro Kitamiya	2
Genba Hirayanagi and Kikutaro	0	Jinzo and Rocky Lobo	2

Block A	Hirayanagi Kikutaro	Ohara Kenoh	Liger Tiger Mask	Striker Crazy	Ogawa Sabre Jr.
Hirayanagi Kikutaro	X	Ohara; Kenoh (12:34)	Liger; Tiger Mask (10:01)	Striker; Crazy (11:23)	Ogawa; Sabre Jr (11:23)
Ohara Kenoh	Ohara; Kenoh (12:34)	X	Ohara; Kenoh (10:26)	Ohara; Kenoh (14:58)	Ogawa; Sabre Jr (19:03)
Liger Tiger Mask	Liger; Tiger Mask (10:01)	Ohara; Kenoh (10:26)	X	Liger; Tiger Mask (10:29)	Liger; Tiger Mask (11:28)
Striker Crazy	Striker; Crazy (11:23)	Ohara; Kenoh (14:58)	Liger; Tiger Mask (10:29)	X	Striker; Crazy (1:24)
Ogawa Sabre Jr.	Ogawa; Sabre Jr (11:23)	Ogawa; Sabre Jr (19:03)	Liger; Tiger Mask (11:28)	Striker; Crazy (1:24)	X
Block B	Kotoge Ishimori	Harada Storm	Tonai Asahi	Kumano Kitamiya	Jinzo Lobo
Kotoge Ishimori	X	Harada; Storm (15:40)	Kotoge; Ishimori (13:52)	Kotoge; Ishimori (14:16)	Kotoge; Ishimori (13:44)
Harada Storm	Harada; Storm (15:40)	X	Tonai; Ashai (13:05)	Harada; Storm (14:01)	Harada; Storm (12:49)
Tonai Asahi	Kotoge; Ishimori (13:52)	Tonai; Ashai (13:05)	X	Tonai; Ashai (12:49)	Jinzo; Lobo (11:31)
Kumano Kitamiya	Kotoge; Ishimori (14:16)	Harada; Storm (14:01)	Tonai; Ashai (12:49)	X	Kumano; Kitamiya (9:23)
Jinzo Lobo	Kotoge; Ishimori (13:44)	Harada; Storm (12:49)	Jinzo; Lobo (11:31)	Kumano; Kitamiya (9:23)	X

Final
A1	Hajime Ohara and Kenoh	Pin
B1	Daisuke Harada and Quiet Storm	13:52

=== 2015 ===
The 2015 NTV G+ Cup Junior Heavyweight Tag League was held from September 5 to 22, 2015. The tournament featured two blocks of five teams each. The participants were announced on August 23; outside entrants included Kota Umeda and Kudo from Dramatic Dream Team, Kaji Tomato and Shiori Asahi from Kaientai Dojo and freelancers Billyken Kid and Buffalo. Kudo was forced to pull out of the tournament on September 16, after suffering a knee injury, leading to him and Umeda forfeiting their final match.

Final standings
Block A		Block B	
El Desperado and Taka Michinoku (c)	6	Atsushi Kotoge and Daisuke Harada	6
Yoshinari Ogawa and Zack Sabre Jr.	6	Kaji Tomato and Shiori Asahi	4
Masamune and Taiji Ishimori	4	Billyken Kid and Buffalo	4
Kota Umeda and Kudo	2	Hajime Ohara and Kenoh	4
Captain Noah and Genba Hirayanagi	2	Hitoshi Kumano and Super Crazy	2

Block A	Noah Hirayanagi	Desperado Michinoku	Umeda Kudo	Masamune Ishimori	Ogawa Sabre Jr.
Noah Hirayanagi	X	Noah; Hirayanagi (16:32)	Umeda; Kudo (11:43)	Masamune; Ishimori (8:30)	Ogawa; Sabre Jr. (12:50)
Desperado Michinoku	Noah; Hirayanagi (16:32)	X	Desperado; Michinoku (forfeit)	Desperado; Michinoku (12:07)	Desperado; Michinoku (5:54)
Umeda Kudo	Umeda; Kudo (11:43)	Desperado; Michinoku (forfeit)	X	Masamune; Ishimori (10:42)	Ogawa; Sabre Jr. (15:46)
Masamune Ishimori	Masamune; Ishimori (8:30)	Desperado; Michinoku (12:07)	Masamune; Ishimori (10:42)	X	Ogawa; Sabre Jr. (13:01)
Ogawa Sabre Jr.	Ogawa; Sabre Jr. (12:50)	Desperado; Michinoku (5:54)	Ogawa; Sabre Jr. (15:46)	Ogawa; Sabre Jr. (13:01)	X
Block B	Kotoge Harada	Billyken Buffalo	Ohara Kenoh	Kumano Crazy	Tomato Asahi
Kotoge Harada	X	Kotoge; Harada (8:20)	Ohara; Kenoh (18:45)	Kotoge; Harada (11:38)	Kotoge; Harada (14:06)
Billyken Buffalo	Kotoge; Harada (8:20)	X	Kid; Buffalo (14:29)	Kid; Buffalo (8:10)	Tomato; Asahi (9:26)
Ohara Kenoh	Ohara; Kenoh (18:45)	Kid; Buffalo (14:29)	X	Ohara; Kenoh (13:28)	Tomato; Asahi (8:32)
Kumano Crazy	Kotoge; Harada (11:38)	Kid; Buffalo (8:10)	Ohara; Kenoh (13:28)	X	Kumano; Crazy (11:39)
Tomato Asahi	Kotoge; Harada (14:06)	Tomato; Asahi (9:26)	Tomato; Asahi (8:32)	Kumano; Crazy (11:39)	X

Final
A1	El Desperado and Taka Michinoku	Pin
B1	Atsushi Kotoge and Daisuke Harada	21:48

=== 2016 ===
The 2016 NTV G+ Cup Junior Heavyweight Tag League took place from July 16 to July 30, 2016.

Final standings
ACH and Taiji Ishimori	8
Atsushi Kotoge and Daisuke Harada (c)	8
Hajime Ohara and Kenoh	6
El Desperado and Yoshinobu Kanemaru	4
Andy Dalton and Hitoshi Kumano	2
Captain Noah and Genba Hirayanagi	2

Results	ACH Ishimori	Dalton Kumano	Kotoge Harada	Captain Hirayanagi	Desperado Kanemaru	Ohara Kenoh
ACH Ishimori	X	ACH; Ishimori (10:54)	ACH; Ishimori (14:31)	ACH; Ishimori (11:36)	Desperado; Kanemaru (12:30)	ACH; Ishimori (8:24)
Dalton Kumano	ACH; Ishimori (10:54)	X	Kotoge; Harada (12:44)	Dalton; Kumano (4:04)	Desperado; Kanemaru (14:31)	Ohara; Kenoh (13:30)
Kotoge Harada	ACH; Ishimori (14:31)	Kotoge; Harada (12:44)	X	Kotoge; Harada (13:42)	Kotoge; Harada (6:12)	Kotoge; Harada (18:56)
Captain Hirayanagi	ACH; Ishimori (11:36)	Dalton; Kumano (4:04)	Kotoge; Harada (13:42)	X	Captain; Hirayanagi (12:27)	Ohara; Kenoh (14:42)
Desperado Kanemaru	Desperado; Kanemaru (12:30)	Desperado; Kanemaru (14:31)	Kotoge; Harada (6:12)	Captain; Hirayanagi (12:27)	X	Ohara; Kenoh (14:12)
Ohara Kenoh	ACH; Ishimori (8:24)	Ohara; Kenoh (13:30)	Kotoge; Harada (18:56)	Ohara; Kenoh (14:42)	Ohara; Kenoh (14:12)	X

Finals
1	ACH and Taiji Ishimori	Pin
2	Atsushi Kotoge and Daisuke Harada	20:25

=== 2017 ===
The 2017 Global Junior Heavyweight Tag League took place from July 13 to July 27, 2017.

Final standings
Hi69 and Taiji Ishimori (c)	10
Hayata and Yo-Hey	10
Hajime Ohara and Hitoshi Kumano	8
Phil Atlas and Seiya Morohashi	8
Daisuke Harada and Tadasuke	8
Mao and Shunma Katsumata	6
Gaston Mateo and Kaiser	4
Gurukun Mask and Shuri Joe	2

Results	Harada Tadasuke	Mateo Kaiser	Gurukun Shuri	Ohara Kumano	Hayata Yo-Hey	Hi69 Ishimori	Mao Katsumata	Atlas Morohashi
Harada Tadasuke	X	Harada; Tadasuke (11:05)	Harada; Tadasuke (13:58)	Ohara; Kumano (18:45)	Hayata; Yo-Hey (17:20)	Harada; Tadasuke (11:55)	Harada; Tadasuke (10:43)	Atlas; Morohashi (13:23)
Mateo Kaiser	Harada; Tadasuke (11:05)	X	Gurukun; Shuri (8:39)	Mateo; Kaiser (9:17)	Hayata; Yo-Hey (4:36)	Hi69; Ishimori (11:15)	Mateo; Kaiser (8:02)	Atlas; Morohashi (10:03)
Gurukun Shuri	Harada; Tadasuke (13:58)	Gurukun; Shuri (8:39)	X	Ohara; Kumano (13:01)	Hayata; Yo-Hey (11:55)	Hi69; Ishimori (10:10)	Mao; Katsumata (10:09)	Atlas; Morohashi (11:56)
Ohara Kumano	Ohara; Kumano (18:45)	Mateo; Kaiser (9:17)	Ohara; Kumano (13:01)	X	Hayata; Yo-Hey (14:24)	Ohara; Kumano (14:49)	Mao; Katsumata (8:09)	Ohara; Kumano (14:16)
Hayata Yo-Hey	Hayata; Yo-Hey (17:20)	Hayata; Yo-Hey (4:36)	Hayata; Yo-Hey (11:55)	Hayata; Yo-Hey (14:24)	X	Hi69; Ishimori (14:12)	Mao; Katsumata (10:25)	Hayata; Yo-Hey (9:42)
Hi69 Ishimori	Harada; Tadasuke (11:55)	Hi69; Ishimori (11:15)	Hi69; Ishimori (10:10)	Ohara; Kumano (14:49)	Hi69; Ishimori (14:12)	X	Hi69; Ishimori (9:28)	Hi69; Ishimori (15:18)
Mao Katsumata	Harada; Tadasuke (10:43)	Mateo; Kaiser (8:02)	Mao; Katsumata (10:09)	Mao; Katsumata (8:09)	Mao; Katsumata (10:25)	Hi69; Ishimori (9:28)	X	Atlas; Morohashi (10:25)
Atlas Morohashi	Atlas; Morohashi (13:23)	Atlas; Morohashi (10:03)	Atlas; Morohashi (11:56)	Ohara; Kumano (14:16)	Hayata; Yo-Hey (9:42)	Hi69; Ishimori (15:18)	Atlas; Morohashi (10:25)	X

Finals
1	Hi69 and Taiji Ishimori	Pin
2	Hayata and Yo-Hey	13:31

=== 2018 ===
The 2018 Global Junior Heavyweight Tag League took place from July 7 to August 5, 2018. Leona was initially Seiya Morohashi's partner for the tournament, but he was replaced by Junta Miyawaki due to injury following the match against Hayata & Yo-Hey.

Final standings
Hayata and Yo-Hey	8
Hajime Ohara and Hitoshi Kumano	8
Ikuto Hidaka and Takuya Sugawara	8
Hi69 and Minoru Tanaka (c)	6
Ricky Marvin and El Hijo del Pantera	6
Daisuke Harada and Tadasuke	6
Junta Miyawaki and Seiya Morohashi	0

Results	Harada Tadasuke	Ohara Kumano	Hayata Yo-Hey	Hi69 Tanaka	Hidaka Sugawara	Miyawaki Morohashi	Marvin Pantera
Harada Tadasuke	X	Ohara; Kumano (19:42)	Harada; Tadasuke (17:18)	Harada; Tadasuke (22:12)	Hidaka; Sugawara (17:41)	Harada; Tadasuke (14:03)	Marvin; Pantera (15:09)
Ohara Kumano	Ohara; Kumano (19:42)	X	Hayata; Yo-Hey (12:56)	Hi69; Tanaka (15:45)	Ohara; Kumano (15:36)	Ohara; Kumano (12:33)	Ohara; Kumano (11:37)
Hayata Yo-Hey	Harada; Tadasuke (17:18)	Hayata; Yo-Hey (12:56)	X	Hayata; Yo-Hey (21:31)	Hayata; Yo-Hey (18:32)	Hayata; Yo-Hey (13:33)	Marvin; Pantera (12:37)
Hi69 Tanaka	Harada; Tadasuke (22:12)	Hi69; Tanaka (15:45)	Hayata; Yo-Hey (21:31)	X	Hidaka; Sugawara (16:39)	Hi69; Tanaka (11:16)	Hi69; Tanaka (12:35)
Hidaka Sugawara	Hidaka; Sugawara (17:41)	Ohara; Kumano (15:36)	Hayata; Yo-Hey (18:32)	Hidaka; Sugawara (16:39)	X	Hidaka; Sugawara (11:59)	Hidaka; Sugawara (12:43)
Miyawaki Morohashi	Harada; Tadasuke (14:03)	Ohara; Kumano (12:33)	Hayata; Yo-Hey (13:33)	Hi69; Tanaka (11:16)	Hidaka; Sugawara (11:59)	X	Marvin; Pantera (13:20)
Marvin Pantera	Marvin; Pantera (15:09)	Ohara; Kumano (11:37)	Marvin; Pantera (12:37)	Hi69; Tanaka (12:35)	Hidaka; Sugawara (12:43)	Marvin; Pantera (13:20)	X

Finals
1	Hayata and Yo-Hey	Pin
2	Hajime Ohara and Hitoshi Kumano	26:05

=== 2019 ===
The 2019 Global Junior Heavyweight Tag League took place from May 28 to June 13, 2019.

Current standings
Kotaro Suzuki and Yoshinari Ogawa (c)	9
Hayata and Yo-Hey	7
Chris Ridgeway and Hitoshi Kumano	6
Daisuke Harada and Tadasuke	6
Hi69 and Minoru Tanaka	6
Junta Miyawaki and Seiya Morohashi	4
Hajime Ohara and Nosawa Rongai	4

Results	Ridgeway Kumano	Harada Tadasuke	Ohara Rongai	Hayata Yo-Hey	Hi69 Tanaka	Miyawaki Morohashi	Suzuki Ogawa
Ridgeway Kumano	X	Harada; Tadasuke (12:59)	Ridgeway; Kumano (9:33)	Hayata; Yo-Hey (15:27)	Ridgeway; Kumano (10:21)	Ridgeway; Kumano (12:14)	Suzuki; Ogawa (16:47)
Harada Tadasuke	Harada; Tadasuke (12:59)	X	Ohara; Rongai (10:32)	Harada; Tadasuke (17:18)	Hi69; Tanaka (17:18)	Harada; Tadasuke (14:10)	Suzuki; Ogawa (2:57)
Ohara Rongai	Ridgeway; Kumano (9:33)	Ohara; Rongai (10:32)	X	Ohara; Rongai (10:52)	Hi69; Tanaka (9:51)	Miyawaki; Morohashi (5:27)	Suzuki; Ogawa (11:20)
Hayata Yo-Hey	Hayata; Yo-Hey (15:27)	Harada; Tadasuke (17:18)	Ohara; Rongai (10:52)	X	Hayata; Yo-Hey (14:42)	Hayata; Yo-Hey (8:43)	Draw (19:51)
Hi69 Tanaka	Ridgeway; Kumano (10:21)	Hi69; Tanaka (17:18)	Hi69; Tanaka (9:51)	Hayata; Yo-Hey (14:42)	X	Miyawaki; Morohashi (12:21)	Hi69; Tanaka (17:18)
Miyawaki Morohashi	Ridgeway; Kumano (12:14)	Harada; Tadasuke (14:10)	Miyawaki; Morohashi (5:27)	Hayata; Yo-Hey (8:43)	Miyawaki; Morohashi (12:21)	X	Suzuki; Ogawa (15:33)
Suzuki Ogawa	Suzuki; Ogawa (16:47)	Suzuki; Ogawa (2:57)	Suzuki; Ogawa (11:20)	Draw (19:51)	Hi69; Tanaka (17:18)	Suzuki; Ogawa (15:33)	X

Finals
1	Kotaro Suzuki and Yoshinari Ogawa	Pin
2	Hayata and Yo-Hey	24:16

=== 2021 ===
In 2021, the Junior Tag League was switched to the Junior Team Game, in which teams of 4 ('units'), competed in 4v4 elimination tag matches in a single-elimination bracket. It was held on 27 July, at Club Citta, Kawasaki, Kanagawa.

The 4 Units competing were:

- Noah Seiki gun: Daisuke Harada, Atsushi Kotoge, Hajime Ohara & Junta Miyawaki
- Stinger: Hayata, Yoshinari Ogawa, Seiki Yoshioka & Yuya Susumu
- Kongo: Tadasuke, Aleja, Haoh & Nioh
- Perros del Mal de Japon: Nosawa Rongai, Yo-Hey, Kotaro Suzuki & Ikuto Hidaka

Semifinals
Kongo	Tadasuke, Aleja, Haoh & Nioh	1-0
Perros	Nosawa Rongai, Yo-Hey, Kotaro Suzuki & Ikuto Hidaka	15:59
Noah	Daisuke Harada, Atsushi Kotoge, Hajime Ohara & Junta Miyawaki	1-0
Stinger	Hayata, Yoshinari Ogawa, Seiki Yoshioka & Yuya Susumu	22:25

Final
Kongo	Tadasuke, Aleja, Haoh & Nioh	1-0
Noah	Daisuke Harada, Atsushi Kotoge, Hajime Ohara & Junta Miyawaki	27:37

==== Kongo vs Perros ====
Eliminated	Wrestler	Eliminated by	Method	Time
1	Ikuto Hidaka	Aleja	Pinfall	7:33
2	Nosawa Rongai	Tadasuke	Pinfall	9:31
3	Haoh	Yo-Hey	Pinfall	12:27
4	Nioh	Yo-Hey	Pinfall	13:00
5	Aleja	Kotaro Suzuki	Over The Top Rope	14:14
6	Kotaro Suzuki	Tadasuke	Pinfall	15:21
7	Yo-Hey	Tadasuke	Over The Top Rope	15:59
Survivor(s):	Tadasuke (Kongo)			

==== Noah vs Stinger ====
Eliminated	Wrestler	Eliminated by	Method	Time
1	Yoshinari Ogawa	Atsushi Kotoge	Pinfall	0:25
2	Yuya Susumu	Hajime Ohara	Submission	12:50
3	Junta Miyawaki	Hayata	Pinfall	14:59
4	Hajime Ohara	Seiki Yoshioka	Pinfall	17:59
5	Atsushi Kotoge	Hayata	Over The Top Rope	19:58
6	Hayata	Atsushi Kotoge	Over The Top Rope	19:58
7	Seiki Yoshioka	Daisuke Harada	Pinfall	22:25
Survivor(s):	Daisuke Harada (Noah Seiki gun)			

==== Kongo vs Noah (Final) ====
Eliminated	Wrestler	Eliminated by	Method	Time
1	Haoh	Atsushi Kotoge	Pinfall	13:16
2	Hajime Ohara	Aleja	Pinfall	15:34
3	Atsushi Kotoge	Nioh	Over The Top Rope	17:54
4	Nioh	Junta Miyawaki	Pinfall	18:42
5	Aleja	Daisuke Harada	Over The Top Rope	20:56
6	Junta Miyawaki	Tadasuke	Pinfall	23:23
7	Daisuke Harada	Tadasuke	Pinfall	27:37
Survivor(s):	Tadasuke (Kongo)			

=== 2022 ===
From 6-7 January, Noah held the inaugural N Innovation U-Cup. It would be contested by the same 4 units who competed last year, only with Dragon Gate's Eita replacing Ikuto Hidaka on the Perros del Mal de Japon team. The format was different, with unit members competing in a tag team match, a Rumble, a six-man tag team match and an elimination 4 way match. For every win a team or individual gets, their unit earned 2 points. A draw would result in a point each. In the case of a points draw, the team who won their head-to-head tag team match would advance. The top two units would advance to a 4v4 Elimination Tag Team Match final, where each team would start with two of their members in the match. When one was eliminated, another one would enter the match to replace them. When a team was down to one wrestler only, they lost the match.

Final standings
Kongo (Tadasuke, Aleja, Haoh & Nioh)	5
Noah Seiki gun (Daisuke Harada, Atsushi Kotoge, Hajime Ohara & Junta Miyawaki)	4
Stinger (Hayata, Yoshinari Ogawa, Seiki Yoshioka & Yuya Susumu)	4
Los Perros del Mal de Japón (Nosawa Rongai, Yo-Hey, Kotaro Suzuki & Ikuto Hidaka)	3

Results	6th Jan Tag Match Noah vs Perros Stinger vs Kongo	Tag Match Noah vs Kongo Stinger vs Perros	Rumble	7th Jan 6-Man Tag Noah vs Stinger Kongo vs Perros	4-Way	Total
Noah	Perros (0)	Kongo (0)	Noah (2)	Noah (2)	Kongo (0)	4
Stinger	Stinger (2)	Stinger (2)	Noah (0)	Noah (0)	Kongo (0)	4
Kongo	Stinger (0)	Kongo (2)	Noah (0)	Draw (1)	Kongo (2)	5
Perros	Perros (2)	Stinger (0)	Noah (0)	Draw (1)	Kongo (0)	3

Finals
1	Kongo	2-1
2	Noah Seiki gun	18:29

==== Rumble ====
Entry	Wrestler	Order	Eliminated by	Method	Time of Elimination
1	Atsushi Kotoge	9	Yo-Hey	Pinfall	16:49
2	Aleja	6	Hajime Ohara	Pinfall	14:54
3	Yuya Susumu	4	Atsushi Kotoge	Pinfall	11:13
4	Yo-Hey	12	Seiki Yoshioka	Over The Top Rope	20:00
5	Seiki Yoshioka	13	Kotaro Suzuki	Pinfall	20:20
6	Tadasuke	5	Junta Miyawaki	Over The Top Rope	11:59
7	Junta Miyawaki	8	Haoh	Pinfall	16:20
8	Nosawa Rongai	2	Yoshinari Ogawa	Over The Top Rope	6:51
9	Yoshinari Ogawa	3	Nosawa Rongai	Over The Top Rope	7:42
10	Eita	1	Nosawa Rongai	Over The Top Rope	6:49
11	Daisuke Harada	-	WINNER	-	-
12	Kotaro Suzuki	14	Daisuke Harada	Pinfall	24:30
13	Haoh	11	Daisuke Harada	Over The Top Rope	18:18
14	Nioh	7	Junta Miyawaki	Pinfall	14:59
15	Hajime Ohara	10	Seiki Yoshioka	Pinfall	17:33
Winner:	Daisuke Harada (Noah Seiki gun)				

==== 4-Way Match ====
Eliminated	Wrestler	Eliminated by	Method	Time
1	Hajime Ohara	Eita	Pinfall	8:13
2	Eita	Seiki Yoshioka	Over The Top Rope	10:45
3	Seiki Yoshioka	Haoh	Pinfall	14:06
Winner:	Haoh (Kongo)			

Noah vs Kongo (Final)

Entry	Wrestler	Order	Eliminated by	Method	Time of Elimination
1	Daisuke Harada	3	Nioh	Pinfall	15:39
1	Tadasuke	4	Hajime Ohara	Pinfall	17:23
2	Junta Miyawaki	1	Aleja	Pinfall	5:20
2	Aleja	2	Daisuke Harada	Pinfall	13:45
3	Atsushi Kotoge	-	WINNER	-	-
3	Nioh	-	Surviving Loser	-	-
4	Hajime Ohara	-	WINNER	-	-
4	Haoh	5	Atsushi Kotoge	Pinfall	18:29
Surviving Loser:	Nioh (Kongo)				
Survivors:	Atsushi Kotoge & Hajime Ohara (Noah Seiki gun)				

=== 2025 ===
Pro Wrestling Noah announced the return of the tournament as simply the Junior Tag League with eight teams competing in 2 groups of 4. The tournament took place between February 11 and March 2 at Noah Memorial Voyage in Yokohama. Mark Trew and Kieron Lacey represented Progress Wrestling, and Jun Masaoka and Gaia Hox represented Pro Wrestling Freedoms.

Final standings
Block A		Block B	
Mark Trew and Kieron Lacey	6	Amakusa and Junta Miyawaki	4
Hayata and Yo-Hey (c)	4	Tadasuke and Yuto Kikuchi	4
Alejandro and Kai Fujimura	2	Jun Masaoka and Gaia Hox	3
Eita and Daiki Odashima	0	Atsushi Kotoge and Hajime Ohara	1

Block A	Hayata Yo-Hey	Alejandro Fujimura	Trew Lacey	Eita Odashima
Hayata Yo-Hey	—N/a	Hayata; Yo-Hey (11:25)	Trew; Lacey (9:33)	Hayata; Yo-Hey (13:18)
Alejandro Fujimura	Hayata; Yo-Hey (11:25)	—N/a	Trew; Lacey (8:44)	Alejandro; Fujimura (10:10)
Trew Lacey	Trew; Lacey (9:33)	Trew; Lacey (8:44)	—N/a	Trew; Lacey (9:15)
Eita Odashima	Hayata; Yo-Hey (13:18)	Alejandro; Fujimura (10:10)	Trew; Lacey (9:15)	—N/a
Block B	Kotoge Ohara	Amakusa Miyawaki	Tadasuke Kikuchi	Masaoka Hox
Kotoge Ohara	—N/a	Amakusa; Miyawaki (14:50)	Tadasuke; Kikuchi (2:19)	Draw (14:19)
Amakusa Miyawaki	Amakusa; Miyawaki (14:50)	—N/a	Amakusa; Miyawaki (11:09)	Masaoka; Hox (10:14)
Tadasuke Kikuchi	Tadasuke; Kikuchi (2:19)	Amakusa; Miyawaki (11:09)	—N/a	Tadasuke; Kikuchi (9:11)
Masaoka Hox	Draw (14:19)	Masaoka; Hox (10:14)	Tadasuke; Kikuchi (9:11)	—N/a

Finals
A1	Mark Trew and Kieron Lacey	Stoppage
B1	Amakusa and Junta Miyawaki	10:40

=== 2026 ===
The 2026 edition of the tournament took place under a single-block format between February 6 and March 1.

Final standings
Wrestlers	Score
Alpha Wolf and Kai Fujimura	12
Dragon Bane and Alejandro	10
Daga and Daiki Odashima	10
Tadasuke and Jun Masaoka	8
Mark Trew and Kieron Lacey	8
Atsushi Kotoge and Hi69	4
Eita and Katsumi Inahata	3
Amakusa and Black Menso-re	3

Results	Daga Odashima	Bane Alejandro	Kotoge Hi69	Amakusa Menso-re	Trew Lacey	Tadasuke Masaoka	Wolf Fujimura	Eita Inahata
Daga Odashima	—N/a	Bane; Alejandro (12:53)	Daga; Odashima (12:34)	Daga; Odashima (12:03)	Daga; Odashima (11:44)	Daga; Odashima (9:23)	Wolf; Fujimura (14:23)	Daga; Odashima (8:35)
Bane Alejandro	Bane; Alejandro (12:53)	—N/a	Bane; Alejandro (11:12)	Bane; Alejandro (9:05)	Bane; Alejandro (12:55)	Tadasuke; Masaoka (9:09)	Wolf; Fujimura (11:22)	Bane; Alejandro (10:13)
Kotoge Hi69	Daga; Odashima (12:34)	Bane; Alejandro (11:12)	—N/a	Kotoge; Hi69 (5:26)	Trew; Lacey (10:00)	Tadasuke; Masaoka (4:13)	Wolf; Fujimura (7:20)	Eita; Inahata (8:11)
Amakusa Menso-re	Daga; Odashima (12:03)	Bane; Alejandro (9:05)	Kotoge; Hi69 (5:26)	—N/a	Trew; Lacey (6:17)	Amakusa; Black Menso-re (6:12)	Wolf; Fujimura (3:55)	Draw (15:00)
Trew Lacey	Daga; Odashima (11:44)	Bane; Alejandro (12:55)	Trew; Lacey (10:00)	Trew; Lacey (6:17)	—N/a	Trew; Lacey (8:32)	Wolf; Fujimura (8:26)	Trew; Lacey (8:32)
Tadasuke Masaoka	Daga; Odashima (9:23)	Tadasuke; Masaoka (9:09)	Tadasuke; Masaoka (4:13)	Amakusa; Black Menso-re (6:12)	Trew; Lacey (8:32)	—N/a	Tadasuke; Masaoka (8:08)	Tadasuke; Masaoka (9:27)
Wolf Fujimura	Wolf; Fujimura (14:23)	Wolf; Fujimura (11:22)	Wolf; Fujimura (7:20)	Wolf; Fujimura (3:55)	Wolf; Fujimura (8:26)	Tadasuke; Masaoka (8:08)	—N/a	Wolf; Fujimura (5:41)
Eita Inahata	Daga; Odashima (8:35)	Bane; Alejandro (10:13)	Eita; Inahata (8:11)	Draw (15:00)	Trew; Lacey (8:32)	Tadasuke; Masaoka (9:27)	Wolf; Fujimura (5:41)	—N/a

Finals
1	Alpha Wolf and Kai Fujimura	Pin
2	Dragon Bane and Alejandro	20:56

== See also ==
- AJPW Junior Tag League
- Super Junior Tag League
