= GHC Junior Heavyweight Tag Team Championship =

Professional wrestling tag team championship

- Current championship design

Details
- Promotion: CyberFight
- Brand: Pro Wrestling Noah
- Date established: July 16, 2003
- Current champions: Team 2000X (Jun Masaoka and Yo-Hey)
- Date won: October 4, 2026
Statistics
- First champions: Kenta and Naomichi Marufuji
- Most reigns: As team: Momo no Seishun Tag (Atsushi Kotoge and Daisuke Harada) (4 reigns); As individual: Atsushi Kotoge (11 reigns)
- Longest reign: Kenta and Naomichi Marufuji (690 days)
- Shortest reign: Minoru Tanaka and Yoshinari Ogawa (1 day)
- Oldest champion: Yoshinari Ogawa (56 years, 1 month and 30 days)
- Youngest champion: Mark Briscoe (21 years, 11 months and 20 days)
- Lightest champion: Yo-Hey (154 lb)

The Global Honored Crown (GHC) Junior Heavyweight Tag Team Championship (Japanese: GHCジュニアヘビー級タッグ王座, Hepburn: GHC Junia Hebī-kyū Taggu Ōza) is a professional wrestling tag team title in Japanese promotion Pro Wrestling Noah, contested exclusively among junior heavyweight wrestlers. It was created on July 16, 2003, when Kenta and Naomichi Marufuji defeated Jushin Thunder Liger and Takehiro Murahama in a tournament final. It is currently one of two tag team titles in Noah, along with the typically heavyweight GHC Tag Team Championship.

== Title history ==
As of November 15, 2026, there have been a total of 62 reigns shared between 47 different teams, consisting of 50 different individual champions. Momo no Seishun Tag (Atsushi Kotoge and Daisuke Harada) have the most reigns as a team at 4. Kotoge also has the most reigns as an individual at 9. Inaugural champions Kenta and Naomichi Marufuji have the longest reign as a team, both individual and combined, at 690 days. They also have the most defenses as a team, both in one reign and combined, at 9. Kotaro Suzuki has both the longest combined reign as an individual at 1,515 days, as well as most combined defenses as an individual at 24. The current champions are Jun Masaoka and Yo-Hey, who are in their second reign as a team and individually. They won the titles by defeating Alejandro and Dragon Bane at the 2026 N-1 Victory Finals.

=== Reigns ===
Key
No.	Overall reign number
Reign	Reign number for the specific team—reign numbers for the individuals are in parentheses, if different
Days	Number of days held
Defenses	Number of successful defenses
+	Current reign is changing daily

No.	Champion	Championship change			Reign statistics			Notes	Ref.
No.	Champion	Date	Event	Location	Reign	Days	Defenses	Notes	Ref.
1	Kenta and Naomichi Marufuji	July 16, 2003	Accomplish Our Third Navigation	Osaka, Japan	1	690	9	Defeated Jushin Thunder Liger and Takehiro Murahama in a tournament final.	
2	Yoshinobu Kanemaru and Takashi Sugiura	June 5, 2005	Navigation with Breeze	Sapporo, Japan	1	273	2		
3	Minoru Fujita and Ikuto Hidaka	March 5, 2006	Navigate for Evolution 2006	Tokyo, Japan	1	161	2		
4	Yoshinobu Kanemaru and Takashi Sugiura	August 13, 2006	Navigation	Tokyo, Japan	2	147	1		
5	The Briscoe Brothers (Jay Briscoe and Mark Briscoe)	January 7, 2007	The First Navigation '07	Tokyo, Japan	1	14	0		
6	Ricky Marvin and Kotaro Suzuki	January 21, 2007	The First Navigation '07	Tokyo, Japan	1	307	5		
7	Naruki Doi and Masato Yoshino	November 24, 2007	Winter Navigation '07	Sapporo, Japan	1	52	1		
8	B×B Hulk and Shingo Takagi	January 15, 2008	Primal Gate 2008	Tokyo, Japan	1	65	0	This was a Dragon Gate event.	
9	Taiji Ishimori and Kenta	March 20, 2008	The Gate of Generation	Tokyo, Japan	1 (1, 2)	115	2	This was a Dragon Gate event.	
10	Yoshinobu Kanemaru and Kotaro Suzuki	July 13, 2008	Summer Navigation '08	Fukuoka, Japan	1 (3, 2)	553	6		
—	Vacated	January 17, 2010	—	—	—	—	—	Vacated due to Suzuki suffering a knee injury.	
11	Ricky Marvin and Taiji Ishimori	February 18, 2010	The Second Navigation '10	Osaka, Japan	1 (2, 2)	185	2	Defeated Yoshinobu Kanemaru and Genba Hirayanagi in a tournament final.	
12	Koji Kanemoto and Tiger Mask	August 22, 2010	New Navigation '10 in Tokyo	Tokyo, Japan	1	124	2		
13	Atsushi Aoki and Naomichi Marufuji	December 24, 2010	Noahful Gift in Differ 2010	Tokyo, Japan	1 (1, 2)	126	2		
—	Vacated	April 29, 2011	—	—	—	—	—	Vacated due to Marufuji suffering an injury.	
14	No Mercy (Kenta and Yoshinobu Kanemaru)	May 25, 2011	The Weekday Navigation 2011 in Korakuen	Tokyo, Japan	1 (3, 4)	144	1	Defeated Atsushi Aoki and Kotaro Suzuki to win the vacant title.	
15	ANMU (Atsushi Aoki and Kotaro Suzuki)	October 16, 2011	The Navigation Sunday 2011 in Korakuen	Tokyo, Japan	1 (2, 3)	280	7		
16	Los Mexitosos (Ricky Marvin and Super Crazy)	July 22, 2012	Great Voyage 2012 in Ryogoku	Tokyo, Japan	1 (3, 1)	231	4		
17	No Mercy (Genba Hirayanagi and Maybach Taniguchi Jr./Suwa)	March 10, 2013	Great Voyage 2013 in Yokohama	Yokohama, Japan	1	81	1	Taniguchi Jr. was unmasked as Suwa during the reign.	
—	Vacated	May 30, 2013	—	—	—	—	—	Vacated due to Suwa suffering a neck injury.	
18	Jushin Thunder Liger and Tiger Mask	July 28, 2013	7th NTV G+ Cup Junior Heavyweight League	Tokyo, Japan	1 (1, 2)	132	4	Defeated Atsushi Kotoge and Taiji Ishimori in the finals of the 2013 NTV G+ Cup Junior Heavyweight Tag League to win the vacant titles.	
19	Yoshinari Ogawa and Zack Sabre Jr.	December 7, 2013	Great Voyage 2013 in Tokyo Vol. 2	Tokyo, Japan	1	104	1		
20	BRAVE (Atsushi Kotoge and Taiji Ishimori)	March 21, 2014	Spring Navigation 2014	Tokyo, Japan	1 (1, 3)	22	0		
21	Yoshinari Ogawa and Zack Sabre Jr.	April 12, 2014	Global Tag League 2014	Tokyo, Japan	2	84	1		
22	BRAVE (Atsushi Kotoge and Taiji Ishimori)	July 5, 2014	Great Voyage 2014 in Tokyo Vol. 2	Tokyo, Japan	2 (2, 4)	99	0		
23	Choukibou-gun (Hajime Ohara and Kenoh)	October 12, 2014	Great Voyage 2014 in Yokohama	Yokohama, Japan	1	154	3		
24	Suzuki-gun (El Desperado and Taka Michinoku)	March 15, 2015	Great Voyage 2015 in Tokyo	Tokyo, Japan	1	203	4	This was a three-way match, also involving Daisuke Harada and Genba Hirayanagi.	
25	Momo no Seishun Tag (Atsushi Kotoge and Daisuke Harada)	October 4, 2015	Great Voyage 2015 in Nagoya	Nagoya, Japan	1 (3, 1)	167	3		
26	KenOhara (Hajime Ohara and Kenoh)	March 19, 2016	Great Voyage 2016 in Korakuen	Tokyo, Japan	2	17	0	KenOhara were previously known as Choukibou-gun.	
27	Momo no Seishun Tag (Atsushi Kotoge and Daisuke Harada)	April 5, 2016	Spring Navigation 2016 Vol. 2	Tokyo, Japan	2 (4, 2)	186	4		
28	World Class Tag Team (Jado and Gedo)	October 8, 2016	Autumn Navigation 2016	Tokyo, Japan	1	77	1		
29	Momo no Seishun Tag (Atsushi Kotoge and Daisuke Harada)	December 24, 2016	Winter Navigation 2016	Tokyo, Japan	3 (5, 3)	2	0		
—	Vacated	December 26, 2016	—	—	—	—	—	Title vacated due to Kotoge moving to the heavyweight division.	
30	XX (Hi69 and Taiji Ishimori)	February 18, 2017	The Second Navigation 2017	Fukuoka, Japan	1 (1, 5)	189	2	Defeated Hayata and Yo-Hey to win the vacant titles.	
31	Ratel's (Hayata and Yo-Hey)	August 26, 2017	Summer Navigation 2017 Vol. 2	Tokyo, Japan	1	154	3		
32	XX (Hi69 and Taiji Ishimori)	January 27, 2018	Navigation For The Future 2018	Osaka, Japan	2 (2, 6)	43	0		
33	Yoshinari Ogawa and Minoru Tanaka	March 11, 2018	Great Voyage 2018 in Yokohama	Osaka, Japan	1 (3, 1)	1	0		
—	Vacated	March 12, 2018	—	—	—	—	—	Ogawa vacated the titles when Taiji Ishimori left Pro Wrestling Noah.	
34	Hi69 and Minoru Tanaka	April 15, 2018	Navigation To The Northern Cross	Osaka, Japan	1 (3, 2)	245	4	Defeated Ratel's (Hayata and Yo-Hey) to win the vacant titles.	
35	Back Breakers (Hajime Ohara and Hitoshi Kumano)	December 16, 2018	Great Voyage in Yokohama Vol. 2	Yokohama, Japan	1 (3, 1)	70	1		
36	Stinger (Yoshinari Ogawa and Kotaro Suzuki)	February 24, 2019	Navigation for the Progress 2019	Tokyo, Japan	1 (4, 4)	251	5		
37	Ratel's (Daisuke Harada and Tadasuke)	November 2, 2019	Noah The Best 2019: Battle Of Aesthetics	Tokyo, Japan	1 (4, 1)	24	0		
38	Stinger (Kotaro Suzuki and Atsushi Kotoge)	November 26, 2019	Starting Over 2019	Niigata, Japan	1 (5, 6)	124	1		
39	Ratel's (Hayata and Yo-Hey)	March 29, 2020	Pro Wrestling Noah 20th Anniversary: Noah The Chronicle Vol. 2	Tokyo, Japan	2	41	1		
—	Vacated	May 9, 2020	—	—	—	—	—	Vacated due to Hayata turning on Yo-Hey during a title defense against Yoshinari Ogawa and Kotaro Suzuki.	
40	Stinger (Hayata and Yoshinari Ogawa)	May 10, 2020	Muta Fantasia	Kawasaki, Japan	1 (3, 5)	154	2	Defeated Ratel's (Yo-Hey and Tadasuke) to win the vacant titles.	
41	Momo no Seishun Tag (Atsushi Kotoge and Daisuke Harada)	October 11, 2020	N-1 Victory 2020 (Night 7)	Osaka, Japan	4 (7, 5)	42	1		
42	Stinger (Hayata and Yoshinari Ogawa)	November 22, 2020	Pro Wrestling Noah 20th Anniversary: Noah The Chronicle Vol. 4	Yokohama, Japan	2 (4, 6)	190	5		
43	Daisuke Harada and Hajime Ohara	May 31, 2021	Mitsuharu Misawa Memorial 2021 In Korakuen Hall: Forever In Our Hearts	Tokyo, Japan	1 (6, 4)	62	1		
44	Scramble Time (Seiki Yoshioka and Yuya Susumu)	August 1, 2021	Cross Over in Hiroshima 2021	Hiroshima, Japan	1	42	1		
45	Atsushi Kotoge and Hajime Ohara	September 12, 2021	N-1 Victory 2021 (Night 1)	Tokyo, Japan	1 (8, 5)	28	0		
46	Los Perros del Mal de Japón (Eita and Nosawa Rongai)	October 10, 2021	Grand Square 2021 in Osaka	Osaka, Japan	1	49	1		
47	Stinger (Hayata and Yoshinari Ogawa)	November 28, 2021	Noah The Best 2021	Tokyo, Japan	3 (5, 7)	52	1		
—	Vacated	January 19, 2022	—	—	—	—	—	Vacated due to Yoshinari Ogawa testing positive for COVID-19.	
48	Scramble Time (Seiki Yoshioka and Yuya Susumu)	January 22, 2022	Higher Ground 2022	Tokyo, Japan	2	20	0	Defeated Atsushi Kotoge and Hajime Ohara to win the vacant titles.	
—	Vacated	February 11, 2022	—	—	—	—	—	Vacated due to Seiki Yoshioka suffering a heel injury.	
49	Atsushi Kotoge and Yo-Hey	February 23, 2022	Gain Control 2022 in Nagoya	Nagoya, Japan	1 (9, 3)	65	2	Defeated Stinger (Hayata and Yuya Susumu) to win the vacant titles.	
50	Stinger (Chris Ridgeway and Yoshinari Ogawa)	April 29, 2022	Majestic 2022: N Innovation	Tokyo, Japan	1 (1, 8)	149	2		
51	Atsushi Kotoge and Seiki Yoshioka	September 25, 2022	Grand Ship in Nagoya 2022	Nagoya, Japan	1 (10, 3)	46	1		
52	Kongo (Hajime Ohara and Shuji Kondo)	November 10, 2022	Global Honored Crown 2022	Tokyo, Japan	1 (6, 1)	13	0		
53	Atsushi Kotoge and Seiki Yoshioka	November 23, 2022	Noah The Best	Tokyo, Japan	2 (11, 4)	30	0		
54	Kzy and Yo-Hey	December 23, 2022	N Innovation 2022	Tokyo, Japan	1 (1, 4)	9	0		
55	Yoshinari Ogawa and Eita	January 1, 2023	Noah The New Year 2023	Tokyo, Japan	1 (9, 2)	105	2		
56	Good Looking Guys (Tadasuke and Yo-Hey)	April 16, 2023	Green Journey in Sendai 2023	Sendai, Japan	1 (2, 5)	67	2		
57	Stinger (Chris Ridgeway and Daga)	June 22, 2023	NOAH Star Navigation 2023	Tokyo, Japan	1 (2, 1)	76	1		
—	Vacated	September 6, 2023	—	—	—	—	—		
58	Los Golpeadores (Dragon Bane and Alpha Wolf)	September 24, 2023	Grand Ship In Nagoya 2023	Nagoya, Japan	1	100	1	Defeated Ninja Mack and Alejandro to win the vacant titles.	
59	Good Looking Guys (Tadasuke and Yo-Hey)	January 2, 2024	The New Year	Tokyo, Japan	2 (3, 6)	159	6	This was a three-way tag team match also involving Ninja Mack and Alejandro.	
60	Eita and Shuji Kondo	June 9, 2024	NOAH Star Navigation; Night 7	Tokyo, Japan	1 (3, 2)	84	1		
61	Ratel's (Hayata and Yo-Hey)	September 1, 2024	N-1 Victory; Night 9	Osaka, Japan	3 (6, 7)	202	5		
62	Amakusa and Junta Miyawaki	March 22, 2025	Star Navigation Premium; Night 3	Osaka, Japan	1	42	1		
63	Los Golpeadores (Alpha Wolf and Dragon Bane)	May 3, 2025	Memorial Voyage in Kokugikan	Tokyo, Japan	2	161	4		
64	Los Intocables (Daga and Daiki Odashima)	October 11, 2025	Wrestle Odyssey	Tokyo, Japan	1 (2, 1)	148	2	Daiki Odashima became the first wrestler to win a Championship in Noah as a rookie.	
65	Dragon Bane and Alejandro	March 8, 2026	Apex Conquest	Yokohama, Japan	1 (3, 1)	210	5		
66	Team 2000X (Jun Masaoka and Yo-Hey)	October 4, 2026	N-1 Victory (Finals)	Yokohama, Japan	1 (1, 8)	42+	1		

== Combined reigns ==
As of November 15, 2026.

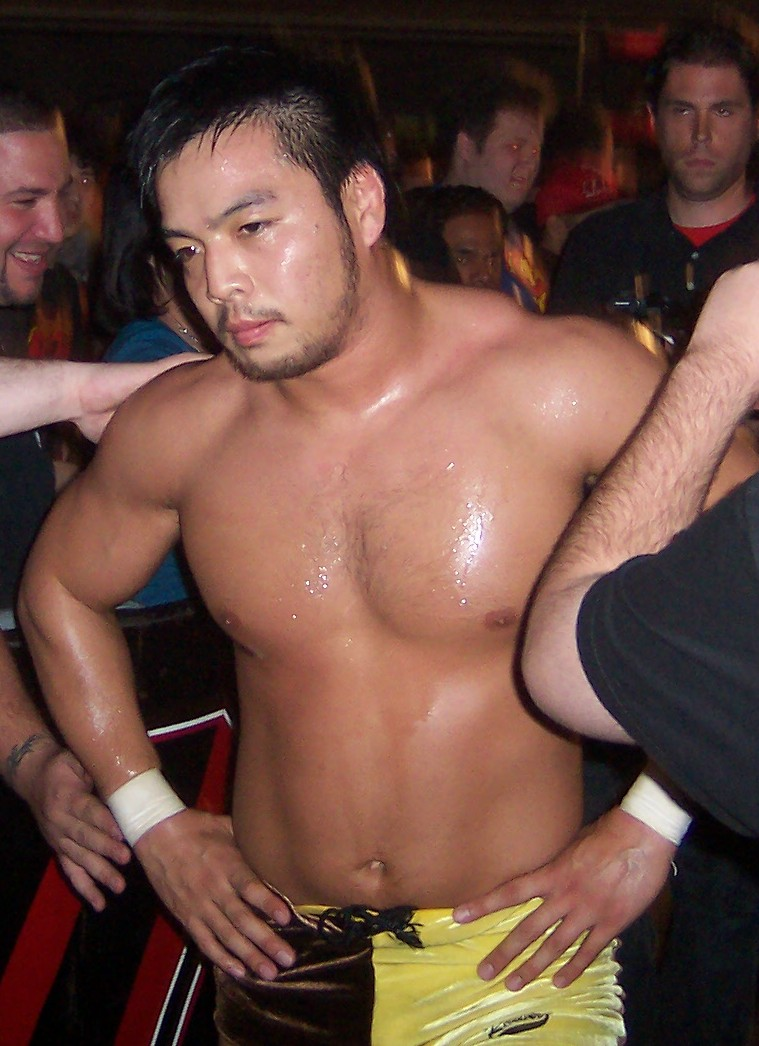
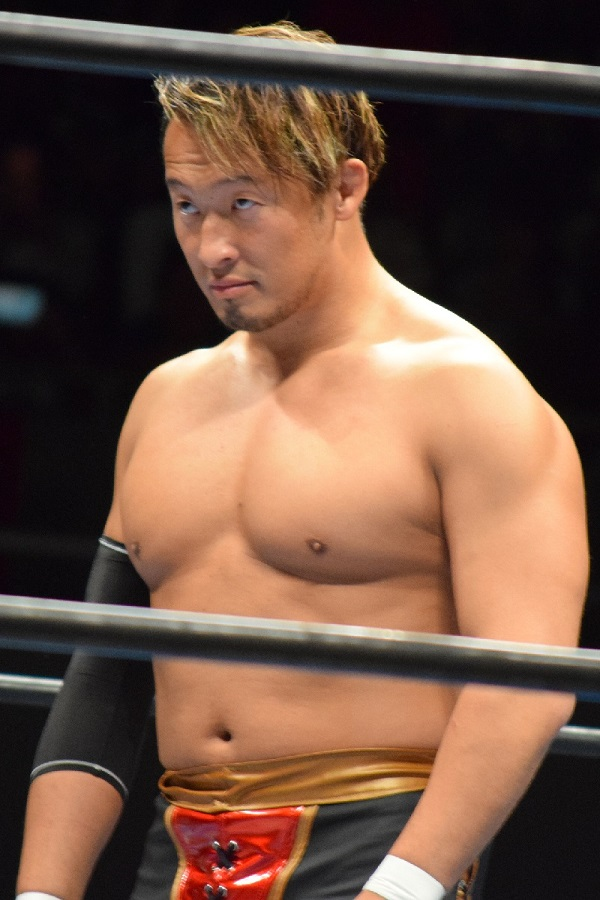
Inaugural champions Kenta (left) and Naomichi Marufuji (right) hold the records for longest-reigning champions at 690 days, and most defenses in one reign at 9.

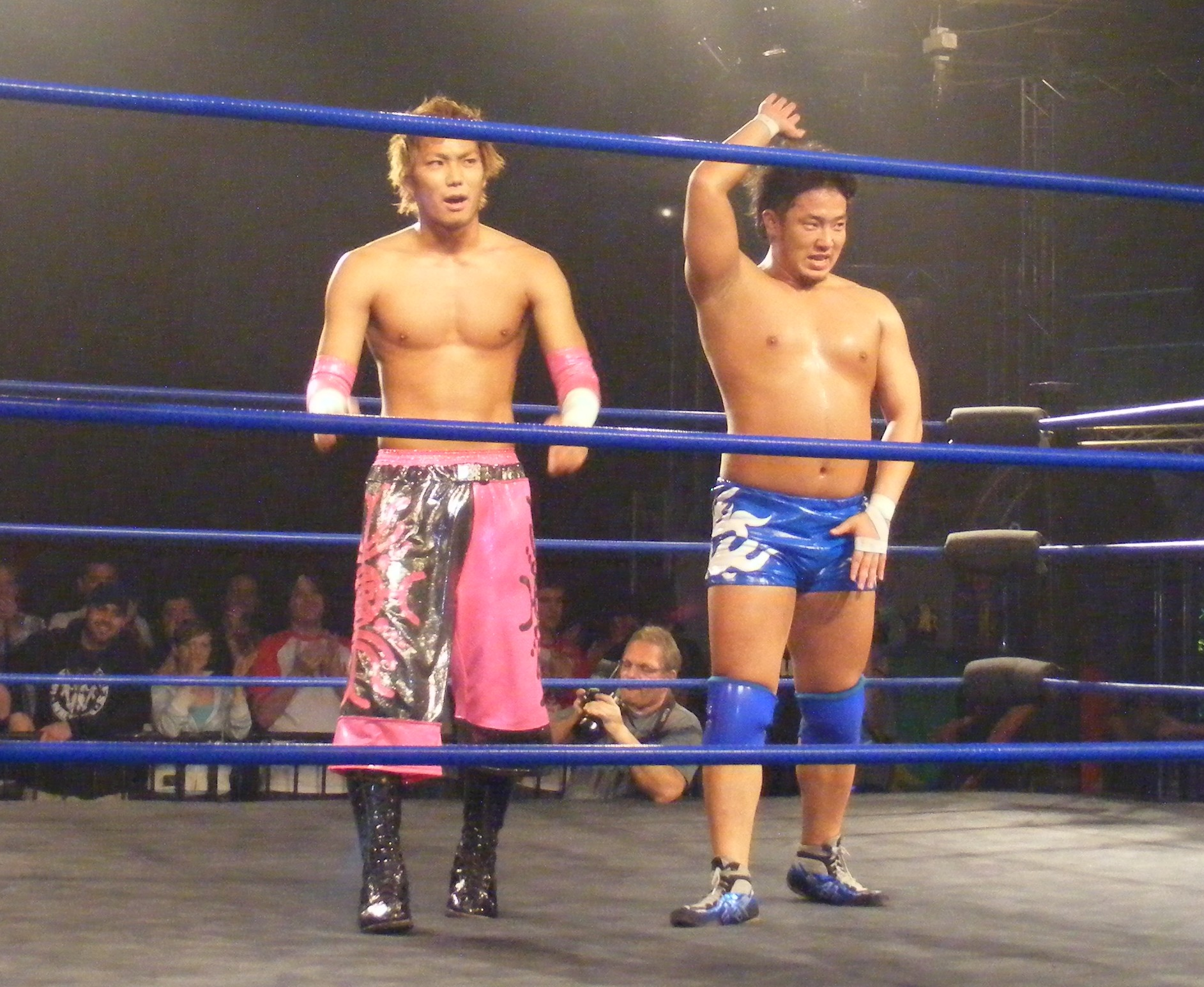
Record four-time champions, Momo no Seishun Tag (Atsushi Kotoge (left) and Daisuke Harada (right)).

†	Indicates the current champion

=== By team ===
Rank	Team	No. of reigns	Combined defenses	Combined days
1	Kenta and Naomichi Marufuji	1	9	690
2	Yoshinobu Kanemaru and Kotaro Suzuki	1	6	553
3	Yoshinobu Kanemaru and Takashi Sugiura	2	3	420
4	Momo no Seishun Tag (Atsushi Kotoge and Daisuke Harada)	4	8	397
4	Ratel's (Hayata and Yo-Hey)	3	9	397
6	Stinger (Hayata and Yoshinari Ogawa)	3	8	396
7	Ricky Marvin and Kotaro Suzuki	1	5	307
8	ANMU (Atsushi Aoki and Kotaro Suzuki)	1	7	280
9	Los Golpeadores (Dragon Bane and Alpha Wolf)	2	5	261
10	Stinger (Yoshinari Ogawa and Kotaro Suzuki)	1	5	251
11	Hi69 and Minoru Tanaka	1	4	245
12	XX (Hi69 and Taiji Ishimori)	2	2	232
13	Los Mexitosos (Ricky Marvin and Super Crazy)	1	4	231
14	Good Looking Guys (Tadasuke and Yo-Hey)	2	8	226
15	Dragon Bane and Alejandro	1	5	210
16	Suzuki-gun (El Desperado and Taka Michinoku)	1	4	203
17	Yoshinari Ogawa and Zack Sabre Jr.	2	2	188
18	Ricky Marvin and Taiji Ishimori	1	2	185
19	Choukibou-gun/KenOhara (Hajime Ohara and Kenoh)	2	3	171
20	Minoru Fujita and Ikuto Hidaka	1	2	161
21	Stinger (Chris Ridgeway and Yoshinari Ogawa)	1	2	149
22	Los Intocables (Daga and Daiki Odashima)	1	2	148
23	No Mercy (Kenta and Yoshinobu Kanemaru)	1	1	144
24	Jushin Thunder Liger and Tiger Mask	1	4	132
25	Atsushi Aoki and Naomichi Marufuji	1	2	126
26	Koji Kanemoto and Tiger Mask	1	2	124
26	Stinger (Kotaro Suzuki and Atsushi Kotoge)	1	1	124
28	BRAVE (Atsushi Kotoge and Taiji Ishimori)	2	0	121
29	Taiji Ishimori and Kenta	1	2	115
30	Yoshinari Ogawa and Eita	1	2	105
31	Eita and Shuji Kondo	1	1	84
32	No Mercy (Genba Hirayanagi and Maybach Taniguchi Jr./Suwa)	1	1	81
33	World Class Tag Team (Jado and Gedo)	1	1	77
34	Atsushi Kotoge and Seiki Yoshioka	2	1	76
34	Stinger (Chris Ridgeway and Daga)	1	1	76
36	Back Breakers (Hajime Ohara and Hitoshi Kumano)	1	1	70
37	Atsushi Kotoge and Yo-Hey	1	2	65
37	B×B Hulk and Shingo Takagi	1	0	65
39	Scramble Time (Seiki Yoshioka and Yuya Susumu)	2	1	62
39	Daisuke Harada and Hajime Ohara	1	1	62
41	Naruki Doi and Masato Yoshino	1	1	52
42	Los Perros del Mal de Japón (Eita and Nosawa Rongai)	1	1	49
43	Team 2000X † (Jun Masaoka and Yo-Hey)	1	1	42+
44	Amakusa and Junta Miyawaki	1	1	42
45	Atsushi Kotoge and Hajime Ohara	1	0	28
46	Ratel's (Daisuke Harada and Tadasuke)	1	0	24
47	The Briscoe Brothers (Jay Briscoe and Mark Briscoe)	1	0	14
48	Kongo (Hajime Ohara and Shuji Kondo)	1	0	13
49	Kzy and Yo-Hey	1	0	9
50	Yoshinari Ogawa and Minoru Tanaka	1	0	1

=== By wrestler ===
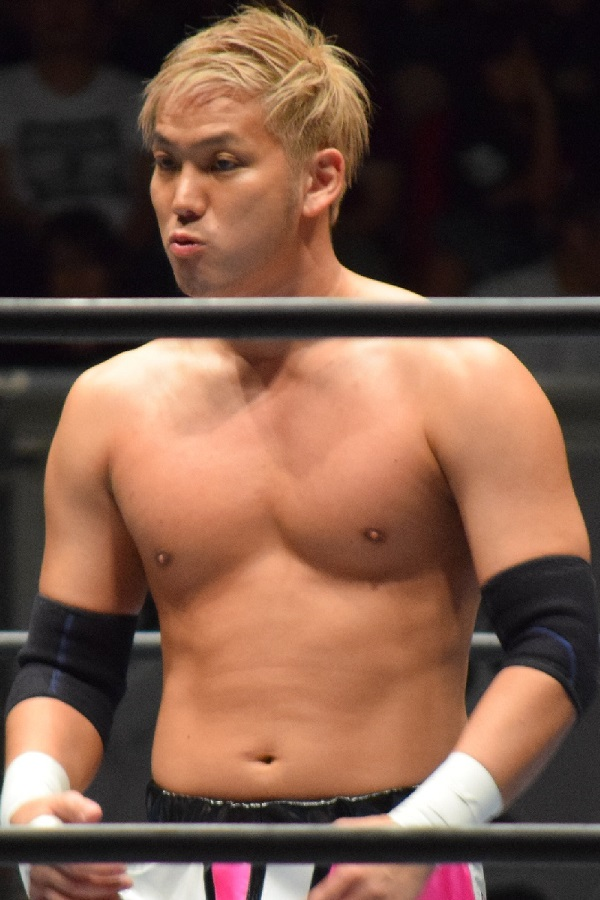
Record eleven-time champion as individual, Atsushi Kotoge.

Rank	Wrestler	No. of reigns	Combined defenses	Combined days
1	Kotaro Suzuki	5	24	1,515
2	Yoshinobu Kanemaru	4	10	1,117
3	Yoshinari Ogawa	9	19	1,090
4	Kenta	3	12	949
5	Naomichi Marufuji	2	11	816
6	Atsushi Kotoge	11	11	811
7	Hayata	6	16	792
8	Yo-Hey †	8	20	738+
9	Ricky Marvin	3	11	723
10	Taiji Ishimori	6	6	653
11	Daisuke Harada	6	9	483
12	Hi69	3	6	477
13	Dragon Bane	3	10	471
14	Takashi Sugiura	2	3	420
15	Atsushi Aoki	2	9	406
16	Hajime Ohara	6	5	344
17	Alpha Wolf	2	5	261
18	Tiger Mask	2	6	256
19	Tadasuke	3	8	250
20	Minoru Tanaka	2	4	246
21	Eita	3	4	238
22	Super Crazy	1	4	231
23	Chris Ridgeway	2	3	225
24	Daga	2	3	224
25	Alejandro	1	5	210
26	El Desperado	1	4	203
26	Taka Michinoku	1	4	203
28	Zack Sabre Jr.	2	2	188
29	Kenoh	2	3	171
30	Minoru Fujita	1	2	161
30	Ikuto Hidaka	1	2	161
32	Daiki Odashima	1	2	148
33	Seiki Yoshioka	4	2	138
34	Jushin Thunder Liger	1	4	132
35	Koji Kanemoto	1	2	124
36	Shuji Kondo	2	1	97
37	Genba Hirayanagi	1	1	81
37	Suwa	1	1	81
39	Gedo	1	1	77
39	Jado	1	1	77
41	Hitoshi Kumano	1	1	70
42	B×B Hulk	1	0	65
42	Shingo Takagi	1	0	65
44	Yuya Susumu	2	1	62
45	Naruki Doi	1	1	52
45	Masato Yoshino	1	1	52
47	Nosawa Rongai	1	1	49
48	Jun Masaoka †	1	1	42+
49	Amakusa	1	1	42
49	Junta Miyawaki	1	1	42
51	Jay Briscoe	1	0	14
51	Mark Briscoe	1	0	14
53	Kzy	1	0	9

== See also ==
- GHC Heavyweight Championship
- GHC National Championship
- GHC Tag Team Championship
- GHC Junior Heavyweight Championship
- GHC Hardcore Championship
