= Genba Hirayanagi =

Japanese professional wrestler

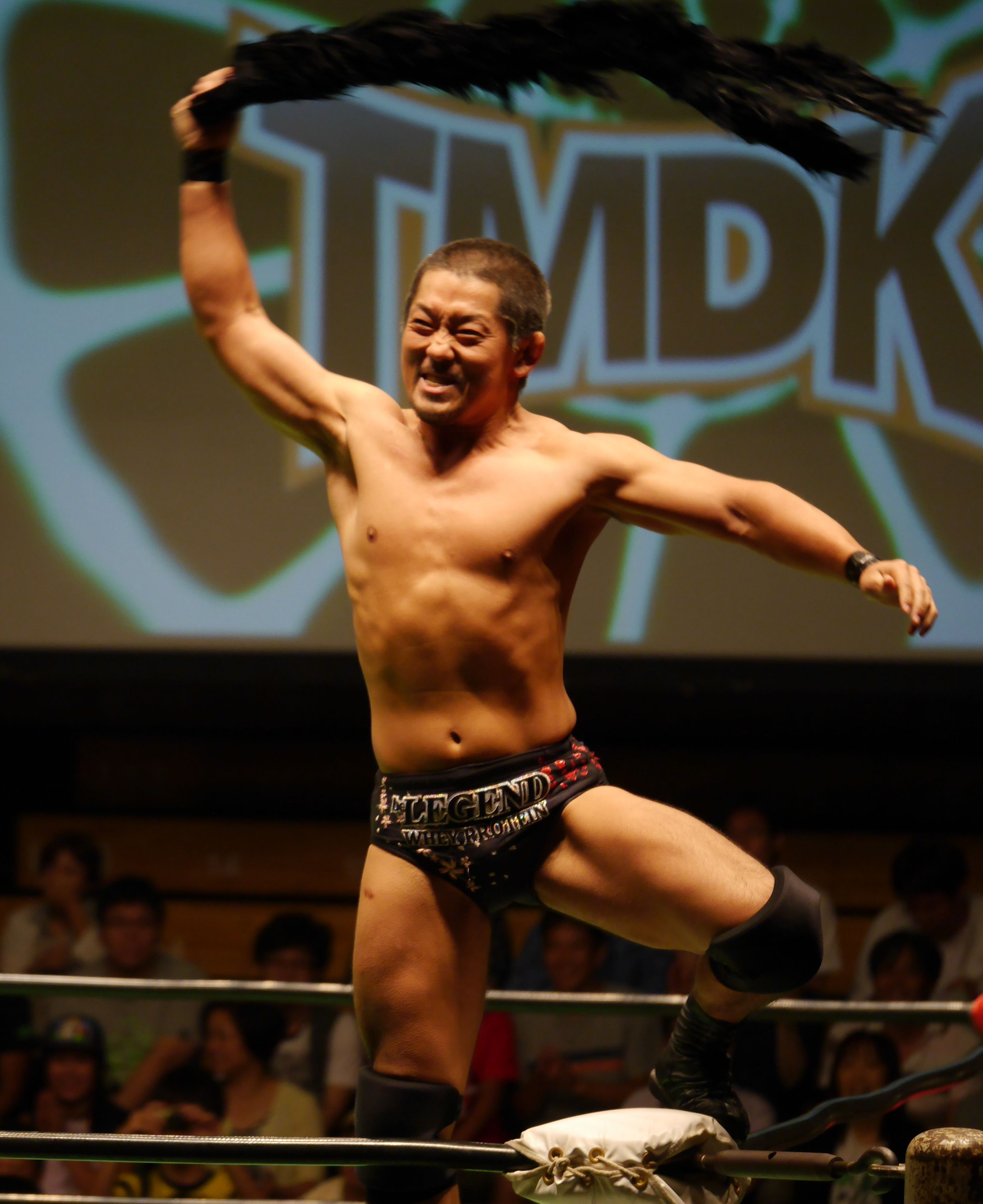
- Hirayanagi in 2015

Personal information
- Born: Tsutomu Hiryanagi; March 9, 1980 (age 46) Kawaguchi, Saitama, Japan

Professional wrestling career
- Ring name(s): Genba Hirayanagi; Tsutomu Hirayanagi
- Billed height: 1.70 m (5 ft 7 in)
- Billed weight: 85 kg (187 lb)
- Trained by: Akira Taue; Pro Wrestling Noah dojo
- Debut: August 15, 2005 (Note: Hirayanagi's untelevised first match on August 15 is not recognised by Pro Wrestling Noah, who state August 18 as his debut.)
- Retired: September 10, 2016

Tsutomu Hirayanagi (平柳 努, Hirayanagi Tsutomu; born March 9, 1980), better known by his ring name Genba Hirayanagi (平柳玄藩, Hirayanagi Genba), is a retired Japanese professional wrestler. He is best known for his time in Pro Wrestling Noah.

== Career ==
Hirayanagi was a competitor in amateur wrestling in high school. In June 2004 he entered the Pro Wrestling Noah dojo where, under the mentorship of Akira Taue, he was trained as a professional wrestler. Wrestling under his birth name, his first match was in a 13-man Battle royal won by Muhammad Yone on 15 August 2005. Three days later, he made his official debut in a singles match against Kishin Kawabata. As is normal for inexperienced competitors in puroresu, virtually all of Hirayanagi's early matches were losses. On March 21, 2006 Hirayanagi competed in a match against SUWA for Pro Wrestling SEM during which he suffered a triple-fracture of the jaw. It wasn't until the following October that he was able to return to the ring in a time-limit draw with Shuhei Taniguchi.

The summer of 2007 saw Hirayanagi venture to the United Kingdom to perform in 6 matches on the British independent circuit. His UK debut came in a July 20 loss to Noah compatriot Shuhei Taniguchi for 3 Count Wrestling. 8 days later, the two teamed up to challenge the 4 Front Wrestling Tag Team Champions Mark Sloan and Wade Fitzgerald. In IPW:UK's Debut In Sittingbourne show he was defeated by James Tighe, which was followed by a loss to veteran Johnny Kidd on a Premier Promotions card before concluding his tour by teaming with Dan Head to gain victory over Mark Haskins and Harry Mills.

In 2008, Hirayanagi made his Ring of Honor debut in the opening match of the 14 September ROH: The Tokyo Summit show. Teaming with Kotaro Suzuki, he lost to the NJPW duo of No Limit (Tetsuya Naito and Yujiro Takahashi). Later that year he gained his first trophy when he teamed with Yoshinobu Kanemaru and Kotaro Suzuki to defeat KENTA, Taiji Ishimori and Ippei Ota to win that year's One Day Junior Heavyweight Six Man Tag Tournament in Sapporo, Hokkaido.

In 2009, Hirayanagi debuted in Dramatic Dream Team (DDT), teaming with his primary trainer Akira Taue to defeat DDT residents Sanshiro Takagi and Michael Nakazawa at the DDT Judgement 2009 event. On August 30, he teamed with frequent partner Kanemaru in his New Japan Pro-Wrestling debut in the main event of the Jado and Gedo 20th Anniversary show, losing to Jado and Gedo. Hirayanagi was selected to participate in another interpromotional contest at the combined AJPW/NJPW/Noah All Together supershow on 27 August 2011 at Budokan Hall, competing in a 10-man tag team match billed as the Junior One Night Carnival.

Hirayanagi then became a member of the No Mercy faction in Noah. On 10 March 10, 2013, Hirayanagi won his first title in Noah, when he and Maybach Taniguchi, Jr. defeated Ricky Marvin and Super Crazy for the GHC Junior Heavyweight Tag Team Championship. The two were forced to vacate the title on May 30, after Suwa had been sidelined with a neck injury. On July 30, Hirayanagi announced his retirement from professional wrestling. His retirement match took place on September 10 and saw him team up with Captain Noah, Go Shiozaki and Maybach Taniguchi to take on Suzuki-gun (Minoru Suzuki, Taichi, Takashi Sugiura and Yoshinobu Kanemaru). Hirayanagi's career ended with Sugiura pinning him for the win.

== Championships and accomplishments ==
- Pro Wrestling Noah

- GHC Junior Heavyweight Tag Team Championship (1 time) – with Maybach Taniguchi, Jr./Suwa
- Bond of Hearts Cup (2013)
- One Day Junior Heavyweight Six Man Tag Tournament (2008) – with Yoshinobu Kanemaru and Kotaro Suzuki
- Matsumoto Day Clinic Cup Scramble Battle Royal (2013)
- Hakata Star Lane Cup Battle Royal (2013)
