= Noah Cross Over in Sendai 2021 =

2021 Pro Wrestling Noah event

NOAH Cross Over in Sendai 2021
- Promotional poster featuring most of the competitors
- Promotion: CyberFight
- Brand: Pro Wrestling Noah
- Date: July 11, 2021
- City: Sendai, Japan
- Venue: Sendai Sun Plaza
- Attendance: 658

Pay-per-view chronology
← Previous; CyberFight Festival	Next → Cross Over in Hiroshima 2021

Cross Over in Sendai chronology
← Previous —	Next → 2024

NOAH Cross Over in Sendai 2021 was a professional wrestling event promoted by CyberFight's sub-brand Pro Wrestling Noah, which took place on July 11, 2021, in Sendai, Japan, at the Sendai Sun Plaza. The event aired on CyberAgent's AbemaTV online linear television service and CyberFight's streaming service Wrestle Universe.

Eight matches were contested at the event, and two of Noah's five championships were on the line. The main event saw Naomichi Marufuji defeat Takashi Sugiura to retain the GHC Heavyweight Championship.

== Background ==
=== Storylines ===
The event featured eight professional wrestling matches that resulted from scripted storylines, where wrestlers portrayed villains, heroes, or less distinguishable characters in the scripted events that built tension and culminated in a wrestling match or series of matches.

=== Event ===
The event started with the singles confrontation between Yasutaka Yano and Nio, solded with the victory of the latter. In the second match, Masaaki Mochizuki and Masato Tanaka picked up a victory over Junta Miyawaki and Kinya Okada in tag team action. The third bout saw GHC Junior Heavyweight Champion Hayata, Seiki Yoshioka and Yuya Susumu outmatching the team of Ikuto Hidaka, Nosawa Rongai and Yo-Hey in six-man tag team competition. Next up, Kazushi Sakuraba, Kazuyuki Fujita and Kendo Kashin defeated Akitoshi Saito, King Tany and Mohammed Yone in another six-person tag bout. In the fifth match, Daisuke Harada and Hajime Ohara defeated Hao and Tadasuke to secure their first successful defense of the GHC Junior Heavyweight Tag Team Championship in that respective reign. Next up, Katsuhiko Nakajima, Kenoh and Manabu Soya defeated Atsushi Kotoge, Yoshiki Inamura and one half of the GHC Tag Team Champions Masa Kitamiya in six-man tag team competition. In the semi main event, Keiji Muto and Yoshinari Ogawa picked up a win over Kaito Kiyomiya and Kotaro Suzuki.

In the main event, Naomichi Marufuji defeated GHC National Champion Takashi Sugiura to secure the first successful defense of the GHC Heavyweight Championship in that respective reign. Later on, he received a challenge from Kazushi Sakuraba in a match which was set for Cross Over in Hiroshima 2021 on August 1.

== Results ==
No.	Results	Stipulations	Times
1	Nio defeated Yasutaka Yano by pinfall	Singles match	7:41
2	M's Alliance (Masaaki Mochizuki and Masato Tanaka) defeated Junta Miyawaki and Kinya Okada by pinfall	Tag team match	9:51
3	Stinger (Hayata, Seiki Yoshioka and Yuya Susumu) defeated Los Perros del Mal de Japón (Ikuto Hidaka, Nosawa Rongai and Yo-Hey) by pinfall	Six-man tag team match	10:41
4	Sugiura-gun (Kazushi Sakuraba, Kazuyuki Fujita and Kendo Kashin) defeated Funky Express (Akitoshi Saito, King Tany and Mohammed Yone) by pinfall	Six-man tag team match	11:59
5	Daisuke Harada and Hajime Ohara (c) defeated Kongo (Hao and Tadasuke) by pinfall	Tag team match for the GHC Junior Heavyweight Tag Team Championship	18:59
6	Kongo (Katsuhiko Nakajima, Kenoh and Manabu Soya) defeated Atsushi Kotoge, Masa Kitamiya and Yoshiki Inamura by pinfall	Six-man tag team match	21:43
7	Keiji Muto and Yoshinari Ogawa defeated Kaito Kiyomiya and Kotaro Suzuki by pinfall	Tag team match	21:56
8	Naomichi Marufuji (c) defeated Takashi Sugiura by pinfall	Singles match for the GHC Heavyweight Championship	32:19
(c) / – the champion(s) heading into the match
