= Noah Cross Over in Hiroshima 2021 =

2021 Pro Wrestling Noah event

NOAH Cross Over in Hiroshima 2021
- Promotional poster featuring various wrestlers
- Promotion: CyberFight
- Brand: Pro Wrestling Noah
- Date: August 1, 2021
- City: Hiroshima, Japan
- Venue: Hiroshima Sun Plaza
- Attendance: 1,085

Pay-per-view chronology
← Previous; Cross Over in Sendai 2021	Next → Grand Square 2021

NOAH Cross Over in Hiroshima 2021 was a professional wrestling event promoted by CyberFight's sub-brand Pro Wrestling Noah. It took place on August 1, 2021, in Hiroshima, Japan, at the Hiroshima Sun Plaza. The event aired on CyberAgent's AbemaTV online linear television service and CyberFight's streaming service Wrestle Universe.

Eight matches were contested at the event, and three of Noah's five championships were on the line. The main event saw Naomichi Marufuji defeat Kazushi Sakuraba to retain the GHC Heavyweight Championship.

== Background ==
=== Storylines ===
The event featured eight professional wrestling matches that resulted from scripted storylines, where wrestlers portrayed villains, heroes, or less distinguishable characters in the scripted events that built tension and culminated in a wrestling match or series of matches.

=== Event ===
The event started with the confrontation between the teams of King Tany and Kinya Okada, and Akitoshi Saito and Mohammed Yone, solded with the latter team's victory. Next up, Aleja, Kenoh and Tadasuke picked up a victory over Daiki Inaba, Junta Miyawaki and Masa Kitamiya in six-man tag team competition. The third bout saw Ikuto Hidaka and Kotaro Suzuki outmatching Yasutaka Yano and Yoshinari Ogawa in tag team action. In the fourth match, Kazuyuki Fujita, Kendo Kashin and Takashi Sugiura defeated Hao, Katsuhiko Nakajima and Nio in six-man tag team action. Next up, Seiki Yoshioka and Yuya Susumu defeated Daisuke Harada and Hajime Ohara to win the GHC Junior Heavyweight Tag Team Championship, ending the latter team's reign at 62 days and one successful defense. In the sixth match, Atsushi Kotoge and one half of the GHC Tag Team Champions Kaito Kiyomiya defeated Nosawa Rongai and Great Muta by disqualification after Muta sprayed Kiyomiya with an Asian mist and attacked him with a chair. In the semi main event, Hayata defeated Yo-Hey to secure the fourth consecutive defense of the GHC Junior Heavyweight Championship in that respective reign.

In the main event, Naomichi Marufuji defeated Kazushi Sakuraba to secure the second consecutive defense of the GHC Heavyweight Championship in that respective reign. It was later announced that Marufuji's next defense of Heavyweight title would be against the upcoming N-1 Victory winner.

== Results ==
No.	Results	Stipulations	Times
1	Funky Express (Akitoshi Saito and Mohammed Yone) defeated King Tany and Kinya Okada by pinfall	Tag team match	11:03
2	Kongo (Aleja, Kenoh and Tadasuke) defeated Daiki Inaba, Junta Miyawaki and Masa Kitamiya by pinfall	Six-man tag team match	8:44
3	Los Perros del Mal de Japón (Ikuto Hidaka and Kotaro Suzuki) defeated Yasutaka Yano and Yoshinari Ogawa by pinfall	Tag team match	12:53
4	Sugiura-gun (Kazuyuki Fujita, Kendo Kashin and Takashi Sugiura) defeated Kongo (Hao, Katsuhiko Nakajima and Nio) by pinfall	Six-man tag team match	12:46
5	Scramble Time (Seiki Yoshioka and Yuya Susumu) defeated Daisuke Harada and Hajime Ohara (c) by pinfall	Tag team match for the GHC Junior Heavyweight Tag Team Championship	20:23
6	Atsushi Kotoge and Kaito Kiyomiya defeated Nosawa Rongai and Great Muta by disqualification	Tag team match	17:59
7	Hayata (c) defeated Yo-Hey by pinfall	Singles match for the GHC Junior Heavyweight Championship	15:27
8	Naomichi Marufuji (c) defeated Kazushi Sakuraba by pinfall	Singles match for the GHC Heavyweight Championship	21:22
(c) / – the champion(s) heading into the match
