= Noah Demolition Stage 2021 =

2021 Pro Wrestling Noah event

NOAH Demolition Stage 2021
- Promotional poster featuring Kaito Kiyomiya
- Promotion: CyberFight
- Brand: Pro Wrestling Noah
- Date: November 13, 2021
- City: Yokohama, Japan
- Venue: Yokohama Budokan
- Attendance: 887

Pay-per-view chronology
← Previous; Grand Square 2021	Next → The Best 2021

Noah Demolition Stage chronology
← Previous —	Next → 2022

NOAH Demolition Stage 2021 was a professional wrestling event promoted by CyberFight's sub-brand Pro Wrestling Noah. It took place on November 13, 2021, in Yokohama, Japan, at the Yokohama Budokan. The event aired on CyberAgent's AbemaTV online linear television service and CyberFight's streaming service Wrestle Universe.

Nine matches were contested at the event, and three of Noah's five championships were on the line. The main event saw M's Alliance (Keiji Muto and Naomichi Marufuji) defeat Kaito Kiyomiya and Masa Kitamiya to win the GHC Tag Team Championship. In another prominent match, Kenoh defeated Masaaki Mochizuki to win the GHC National Championship.

== Background ==
=== Storylines ===
The event featured seven professional wrestling matches that resulted from scripted storylines, where wrestlers portrayed villains, heroes, or less distinguishable characters in the scripted events that built tension and culminated in a wrestling match or series of matches.

=== Event ===
The event started with the singles confrontation between Yasutaka Yano and Hajime Ohara solded with the victory of the latter. Next up, Tadasuke defeated Yo-Hey in singles competition. In the third bout, Akitoshi Saito, King Tany and Mohammed Yone picked up a victory over Kazushi Sakuraba, Kendo Kashin and Takashi Sugiura in six-man tag team action. In the fourth bout, Hao, GHC Heavyweight Champion Katsuhiko Nakajima, Manabu Soya and Nio outmachted Atsushi Kotoge and Daisuke Harada), Daiki Inaba and Kinya Okada in eight-man tag team action. In the fifth bout, Kazuyuki Fujita defeated Yoshiki Inamura in singles competition. Next up, Seiki Yoshioka, Yoshinari Ogawa and Yuya Susumu defeated Eita, Nosawa Rongai and Kotaro Suzuki in six-man tag team action. Next up, Hayata defeated Aleja to secure the sixth consecutive defense of the GHC Junior Heavyweight Championship in that respective reign. In the semi main event, Kenoh defeated Masaaki Mochizuki to win the GHC National Championship. After the bout concluded, Kenoh issued a challenge to Katsuhiko Nakajima's GHC Heavyweight Championship in a bout set to take place for both titles at The Best 2021 on November 28.

In the main event, Keiji Muto and Naomichi Marufuji defeated Kaito Kiyomiya and Masa Kitamiya to win the GHC Tag Team Championship.

== Results ==
No.	Results	Stipulations	Times
1	Hajime Ohara defeated Yasutaka Yano by pinfall	Singles match	7:53
2	Tadasuke defeated Yo-Hey by pinfall	Singles match	10:13
3	Funky Express (Akitoshi Saito, King Tany and Mohammed Yone) defeated Sugiura-gun (Kazushi Sakuraba, Kendo Kashin and Takashi Sugiura) by pinfall	Six-man tag team match	15:18
4	Kongo (Hao, Katsuhiko Nakajima, Manabu Soya and Nio) defeated Momo No Seishun Tag (Atsushi Kotoge and Daisuke Harada), Daiki Inaba and Kinya Okada by pinfall	Eight-man tag team match	16:31
5	Kazuyuki Fujita defeated Yoshiki Inamura by pinfall	Singles match	9:59
6	Stinger (Seiki Yoshioka, Yoshinari Ogawa and Yuya Susumu) defeated Los Perros del Mal de Japón (Eita, Kotaro Suzuki and Nosawa Rongai) by disqualification	Six-man tag team match	11:35
7	Hayata (c) defeated Aleja by pinfall	Singles match for the GHC Junior Heavyweight Championship	17:41
8	Kenoh defeated Masaaki Mochizuki (c) by knockout	Singles match for the GHC National Championship	17:32
9	M's Alliance (Keiji Muto and Naomichi Marufuji) defeated Kaito Kiyomiya and Masa Kitamiya (c) by pinfall	Tag team match for the GHC Tag Team Championship	30:27
(c) / – the champion(s) heading into the match
