= Noah The Best 2021 =

2021 Pro Wrestling Noah event

NOAH The Best 2021
- Promotional poster featuring Kaito Kiyomiya, Takashi Sugiura, Naomichi Marufuji and Katsuhiko Nakajima
- Promotion: CyberFight
- Brand: Pro Wrestling Noah
- Date: November 28, 2021
- City: Tokyo, Japan
- Venue: Yoyogi National Gymnasium
- Attendance: 917

Pay-per-view chronology
← Previous; Demolition Stage 2021	Next → The New Year 2022

Noah The Best chronology
← Previous; 2020	Next → 2022

NOAH The Best 2021 was a professional wrestling event promoted by CyberFight's sub-brand Pro Wrestling Noah. It took place on November 28, 2021, in Tokyo, Japan, at the Yoyogi National Gymnasium. The event aired on CyberAgent's AbemaTV online linear television service and CyberFight's streaming service Wrestle Universe.

Seven matches were contested at the event, including one on the pre-show, and three of Noah's five championships were on the line. The main event saw Katsuhiko Nakajima and Kenoh go to a time-limit draw in their Winner takes all match for both the GHC Heavyweight Championship and GHC National Championship.

== Background ==
=== Storylines ===
The event featured seven professional wrestling matches that resulted from scripted storylines, where wrestlers portrayed villains, heroes, or less distinguishable characters in the scripted events that built tension and culminated in a wrestling match or series of matches.

=== Event ===
The event started with the preshow singles confrontation between Kai Fujimura and Kinya Okada solded with the victory of the latter.

In the first main card bout, Kotaro Suzuki and Yo-Hey picked up a victory over Seiki Yoshioka and Yuya Susumu in tag team action. Next up, Akitoshi Saito, King Tany and Mohammed Yone defeated Daiki Inaba, Masa Kitamiya and Yoshiki Inamura in six-man tag team action. In the fourth bout, Atsushi Kotoge and Daisuke Harada, Hajime Ohara, Kaito Kiyomiya and Yasutaka Yano picked up a victory over Aleja, Hao, Manabu Soya, Nio and Tadasuke in ten-man tag team competition. Next up, Hayata and Yoshinari Ogawa defeated Eita and Nosawa Rongai to win the GHC Junior Heavyweight Tag Team Championship, ending the latter team's reign at 49 days and one successful defense. In the semi main event, GHC Tag Team Champions Keiji Muto and Naomichi Marufuji alongside Masato Tanaka defeated Kazushi Sakuraba, Kazuyuki Fujita and Takashi Sugiura in six-man tag team action. On the night of the event, it was announced that New Japan Pro Wrestling's Kenta would make his return to Noah at The New Year 2022 on January 1.

In the main event, Katsuhiko Nakajima and Kenoh went into a sixty-minute time-limit draw in a bout where they defended the GHC Heavyweight Championship and GHC National Championship in a winner-takes all stipulation. Both champions retained their respective titles, therefore Nakajima secured his second defense of that respective reign of his title, and Kenoh the first one. After the bout concluded, a returning Go Shiozaki laid a title challenge to Nakajima in a bout which was set for The New Year 2022 on January 1.

== Results ==
No.	Results	Stipulations	Times
1^{P}	Kinya Okada defeated Kai Fujimura by pinfall	Singles match	6:15
2	Los Perros del Mal de Japón (Kotaro Suzuki and Yo-Hey) defeated Stinger (Seiki Yoshioka and Yuya Susumu) by pinfall	Tag team match	11:24
3	Funky Express (Akitoshi Saito, King Tany and Mohammed Yone) defeated Daiki Inaba, Masa Kitamiya and Yoshiki Inamura by pinfall	Six-man tag team match	10:40
4	Momo No Seishun Tag (Atsushi Kotoge and Daisuke Harada), Hajime Ohara, Kaito Kiyomiya and Yasutaka Yano defeated Kongo (Aleja, Hao, Manabu Soya, Nio and Tadasuke) by pinfall	Ten-man tag team match	17:21
5	Stinger (Hayata and Yoshinari Ogawa) defeated Los Perros del Mal de Japón (Eita and Nosawa Rongai) (c) by pinfall	Tag team match for the GHC Junior Heavyweight Tag Team Championship	13:59
6	M's Alliance (Keiji Muto, Masato Tanaka and Naomichi Marufuji) defeated Sugiura-gun (Kazushi Sakuraba, Kazuyuki Fujita and Takashi Sugiura) by pinfall	Six-man tag team match	20:52
7	Katsuhiko Nakajima (Heavyweight) vs. Kenoh (National) ended in a time-limit draw	Winner takes all match for the GHC Heavyweight Championship and GHC National Championship	60:00
(c) / – the champion(s) heading into the match; P / – the match was broadcast on the pre-show
