= Noah Grand Square 2021 =

2021 Pro Wrestling Noah event

NOAH Grand Square 2021
- Promotional poster featuring Naomichi Marufuji
- Promotion: CyberFight
- Brand: Pro Wrestling Noah
- Date: October 10, 2021
- City: Osaka, Japan
- Venue: Edion Arena Osaka
- Attendance: 1,291

Pay-per-view chronology
← Previous; Cross Over in Hiroshima 2021	Next → Demolition Stage 2021

NOAH Grand Square 2021 was a professional wrestling event promoted by CyberFight's sub-brand Pro Wrestling Noah. It took place on October 10, 2021, in Osaka, Japan, at the Edion Arena Osaka. The event aired on CyberAgent's AbemaTV online linear television service and CyberFight's streaming service Wrestle Universe.

Nine matches were contested at the event, and three of Noah's five championships were on the line. The main event saw Katsuhiko Nakajima defeat Naomichi Marufuji to win the GHC Heavyweight Championship.

== Background ==
=== Storylines ===
The event featured nine professional wrestling matches that resulted from scripted storylines, where wrestlers portrayed villains, heroes, or less distinguishable characters in the scripted events that built tension and culminated in a wrestling match or series of matches.

=== Event ===
The event started with the tag team confrontation between the teams of Kinya Okada and Yasutaka Yano, and Daiki Inaba and Kai Fujimura, solded with the victory of the latters. Next up, Akitoshi Saito, King Tany and Mohammed Yone picked up a victory over Hao, Nio and Tadasuke in six-man tag team competition. The third bout saw Aleja and Manabu Soya outmatching Junta Miyawaki and Masa Kitamiya in tag team action. In the fourth match, Kotaro Suzuki and Yo-Hey defeated Seiki Yoshioka and Yoshinari Ogawa in tag team competition. The fifth match saw Masaaki Mochizuki, Masakatsu Funaki and Masato Tanaka defeating Kazuyuki Fujita, Kendo Kashin and Takashi Sugiura in six-man tag team action. Next up Eita and Nosawa Rongai defeated Atsushi Kotoge and Hajime Ohara to win the GHC Junior Heavyweight Tag Team Championship, ending the latter team's reign at 28 days and no successful defenses. In the seventh match, Hayata defeated Daisuke Harada to secure the fifth consecutive defense of the GHC Junior Heavyweight Championship in that respective reign. In the semi main event, one half of the GHC Tag Team Champions Kaito Kiyomiya and Kenoh picked up a victory over Kazushi Sakuraba and Keiji Muto in tag team competition.

In the main event, Katsuhiko Nakajima defeated Naomichi Marufuji to win the GHC Heavyweight Championship, ending the latter's reign at 126 days and two successful defenses.

== Results ==
No.	Results	Stipulations	Times
1	Daiki Inaba and Kai Fujimura defeated Kinya Okada and Yasutaka Yano by pinfall	Tag team match	11:17
2	Funky Express (Akitoshi Saito, King Tany and Mohammed Yone) defeated Kongo (Hao, Nio and Tadasuke) by pinfall	Six-man tag team match	9:39
3	Kongo (Aleja and Manabu Soya) defeated Junta Miyawaki and Masa Kitamiya by pinfall	Tag team match	13:47
4	Los Perros del Mal de Japón (Kotaro Suzuki and Yo-Hey) defeated Stinger (Seiki Yoshioka and Yoshinari Ogawa) by pinfall	Tag team match	6:54
5	M's Alliance (Masaaki Mochizuki, Masakatsu Funaki and Masato Tanaka) defeated Sugiura-gun (Kazuyuki Fujita, Kendo Kashin and Takashi Sugiura) by pinfall	Six-man tag team match	18:19
6	Los Perros del Mal de Japón (Eita and Nosawa Rongai) defeated Atsushi Kotoge and Hajime Ohara (c) by pinfall	Tag team match for the GHC Junior Heavyweight Tag Team Championship	4:04
7	Hayata (c) defeated Daisuke Harada by pinfall	Singles match for the GHC Junior Heavyweight Championship	19:09
8	Kaito Kiyomiya and Kenoh defeated Kazushi Sakuraba and Keiji Muto by pinfall	Tag team match	20:54
9	Katsuhiko Nakajima defeated Naomichi Marufuji (c) by pinfall	Singles match for the GHC Heavyweight Championship	37:18
(c) / – the champion(s) heading into the match
