= Noah Mitsuharu Misawa Memorial 2021 =

2021 Pro Wrestling Noah event

NOAH Mitsuharu Misawa Memorial 2021
- Promotional poster featuring Mitsuharu Misawa and Keiji Mutoh
- Promotion: CyberFight
- Brand: Pro Wrestling Noah
- Date: May 31, 2021
- City: Tokyo, Japan
- Venue: Korakuen Hall
- Attendance: 614
- Tagline: Forever In Our Hearts

Pay-per-view chronology
← Previous; The Glory 2021	Next → CyberFight Festival

NOAH Mitsuharu Misawa Memorial 2021 In Korakuen Hall: Forever In Our Hearts was a professional wrestling memorial show promoted by CyberFight's sub-brand Pro Wrestling Noah took place on May 31, 2021, in Tokyo, Japan, at the Korakuen Hall. The event aired on CyberAgent's AbemaTV online linear television service, CyberFight's streaming service Wrestle Universe and Triller TV.

The event commemorated the life of Pro Wrestling Noah founder and legend Mitsuharu Misawa who died on June 13, 2009, at age 46, during a tag match in Hiroshima with Go Shiozaki against Akitoshi Saito and Bison Smith.

== Background ==
=== Storylines ===
The event featured seven professional wrestling matches that resulted from scripted storylines, where wrestlers portrayed villains, heroes, or less distinguishable characters in the scripted events that built tension and culminated in a wrestling match or series of matches.

=== Event ===
The event started with the singles confrontation between Hao and Seiki Yoshioka, solded with the victory of the latter. In the second match, Kenoh, Manabu Soya, Nio and Tadasuke picked up a victory over Junta Miyawaki, Kaito Kiyomiya, Kinya Okada and Yoshiki Inamura in eight-man tag team competition. The third bout saw Daisuke Harada and Hajime Ohara defeating Hayata and Yoshinari Ogawa to win the GHC Junior Heavyweight Tag Team Championship, ending the latter team's reign at 190 days and five successful defenses. Next up, Katsuhiko Nakajima and Masa Kitamiya defeated Mohammed Yone and Shuhei Taniguchi to secure the first successful defense of the GHC Tag Team Championship in that respective reign. In the fifth bout, Atsushi Kotoge defeated Yuya Susumu to secure the second consecutive defense of the GHC Junior Heavyweight Championship in that respective reign. In the semi main event, Takashi Sugiura defeated Kazushi Sakuraba to secure the first successful defense of the GHC National Championship in that respective reign.

In the main event, Keiji Muto and Masato Tanaka outmatched Masakatsu Funaki and Naomichi Marufuji in a friendly intra-stable tag team bout.

== Results ==
No.	Results	Stipulations	Times
1	Seiki Yoshioka defeated Hao by pinfall	Singles match	4:50
2	Kongo (Kenoh, Manabu Soya, Nio and Tadasuke) defeated Junta Miyawaki, Kaito Kiyomiya, Kinya Okada and Yoshiki Inamura by pinfall	Eight-man tag team match	12:25
3	Daisuke Harada and Hajime Ohara defeated Stinger (Hayata and Yoshinari Ogawa) (c) by pinfall	Tag team match for the GHC Junior Heavyweight Tag Team Championship	26:52
4	The Aggression (Katsuhiko Nakajima and Masa Kitamiya) (c) defeated Funky Express (Mohammed Yone and Shuhei Taniguchi) by pinfall	Tag team match for the GHC Tag Team Championship	21:05
5	Atsushi Kotoge (c) defeated Yuya Susumu by pinfall	Singles match for the GHC Junior Heavyweight Championship	12:31
6	Takashi Sugiura (c) defeated Kazushi Sakuraba by pinfall	Singles match for the GHC National Championship	15:18
7	M's Alliance (Keiji Muto and Masato Tanaka) defeated M's Alliance (Masakatsu Funaki and Naomichi Marufuji) by pinfall	Tag team match	18:03
(c) / – the champion(s) heading into the match
