= Noah Cross Over in Sendai 2025 =

2025 Pro Wrestling Noah event

NOAH Cross Over in Sendai 2025
- Promotional poster featuring Yoshiki Inamura and Kaito Kiyomiya
- Promotion: CyberFight
- Brand: Pro Wrestling Noah
- Date: November 21, 2025
- City: Sendai, Japan
- Venue: Sendai Sun Plaza
- Attendance: 832

Pay-per-view chronology
← Previous; Star Navigation 2025 (Night 3)	Next → The New Year

Cross Over in Sendai chronology
← Previous; 2024	Next → —

NOAH Cross Over in Sendai 2025 was a professional wrestling event promoted by CyberFight's sub-brand, Pro Wrestling Noah. It took place on November 21, 2025, in Sendai, Japan, at the Sendai Sun Plaza. The event aired on CyberAgent's AbemaTV online linear television service and CyberFight's streaming service Wrestle Universe.

Eight matches were contested at the event, with two of Noah's seven championships on the line. The main event saw Yoshiki Inamura defeat Kaito Kiyomiya to retain the GHC Heavyweight Championship. In other prominent matches, Hiromu Takahashi defeated Kai Fujimura in the finals of the 2025 Jr. Grand Prix tournament, and Team 2000X (Masa Kitamiya and Takashi Sugiura) defeated WWE NXT's Hank And Tank (Hank Walker and Tank Ledger) to win the GHC Tag Team Championship.

== Background ==
=== Storylines ===
The event featured eight professional wrestling matches that resulted from scripted storylines, where wrestlers portrayed villains, heroes, or less distinguishable characters in the scripted events that built tension and culminated in a wrestling match or series of matches.

=== Event ===
The event started with the ten-man tag team competition bout in which the team of Alejandro, Amakusa, Daga, Daiki Odashima and Ninja Mack picked up a victory over the team of Black Menso-re, Eita, Shuji Kondo and Yuto Kikuchi.

Next up, Kai Fujimura defeated Hayata in the semifinals of the 2025 Jr. Grand Prix tournament. Next up, Hiromu Takahashi outmatched Tadasuke in the same stage of the competition. In the fourth match, Kenta, Tetsuya Endo and Ulka Sasaki picked up a victory over Manabu Soya, Saxon Huxley and Kazuyuki Fujita in six-man tag team competition. Next up, Jack Morris, Junta Miyawaki, Kenoh and Naomichi Marufuji outmatched Atsushi Kotoge, Hajime Ohara, Hi69 and Mohammed Yone in eight-man tag team competition. The sixth match saw Masa Kitamiya and Takashi Sugiura defeat WWE NXT's Hank Walker and Tank Ledger to win back the GHC Tag Team Championship which they lost 13 days prior to the event, on the third night of the Star Navigation 2025, thus ending the latter team's reign with no defenses. In the semi main event, Hiromu Takahashi defeated Kai Fujimura in the finals of the 2025 Jr. Grand Prix tournament. After the bout concluded, Takahashi, who was also the GHC Junior Heavyweight Champion at the time, was challenged by Amakusa to a title match set to occur at The New Year on January 1, 2026.

In the main event, Yoshiki Inamura defeated Kaito Kiyomiya to secure the first successful defense of the GHC Heavyweight Championship in that respective reign. After the match concluded, Ozawa returned from an injury hiatus to hint a title challenge for Inamura at The New Year.

== Results ==
No.	Results	Stipulations	Times
1	Alejandro, Amakusa, Daga, Daiki Odashima and Ninja Mack defeated Black Menso-re, Eita, Shuji Kondo and Yuto Kikuchi by pinfall	Ten-man tag team match	7:42
2	Kai Fujimura defeated Hayata by pinfall	Semifinal match in the Jr. Grand Prix tournament	8:38
3	Hiromu Takahashi defeated Tadasuke by pinfall	Semifinal match in the Jr. Grand Prix tournament	10:11
4	Kenta, Tetsuya Endo and Ulka Sasaki defeated Ratel's (Manabu Soya and Saxon Huxley) and Kazuyuki Fujita by pinfall	Six-man tag team match	5:34
5	Jack Morris, Junta Miyawaki, Kenoh and Naomichi Marufuji defeated Team Noah (Atsushi Kotoge, Hajime Ohara, Hi69 and Mohammed Yone) by pinfall	Eight-man tag team match	10:25
6	Team 2000X (Masa Kitamiya and Takashi Sugiura) defeated Hank And Tank (Hank Walker and Tank Ledger) (c) by pinfall	Tag team match for the GHC Tag Team Championship	11:29
7	Hiromu Takahashi defeated Kai Fujimura by pinfall	Finals of the Jr. Grand Prix tournament	14:26
8	Yoshiki Inamura (c) defeated Kaito Kiyomiya by pinfall	Singles match for the GHC Heavyweight Championship	16:36
(c) / – the champion(s) heading into the match
