= Noah Cross Over in Sendai 2024 =

2024 Pro Wrestling Noah event

NOAH Cross Over in Sendai 2024
- Promotional poster featuring Kenoh and El Hijo de Dr. Wagner Jr.
- Promotion: CyberFight
- Brand: Pro Wrestling Noah
- Date: February 4, 2024
- City: Sendai, Japan
- Venue: Sendai Sun Plaza
- Attendance: 1,104

Pay-per-view chronology
← Previous; Sunny Voyage 2024	Next → Noah Star Navigation 2024 (Night 2)

Cross Over in Sendai chronology
← Previous; 2021	Next → 2025

NOAH Cross Over in Sendai 2024 was a professional wrestling event promoted by CyberFight's sub-brand, Pro Wrestling Noah. It took place on February 4, 2024, in Sendai, Japan, at the Sendai Sun Plaza. The event aired on CyberAgent's AbemaTV online linear television service and CyberFight's streaming service Wrestle Universe.

Eight matches were contested at the event, including two during the pre-show, and three of Noah's six championships were on the line. The main event saw El Hijo de Dr. Wagner Jr. defeat Kenoh to win the GHC Heavyweight Championship. Other top matches included Good Looking Guys (Jack Morris and Anthony Greene) defeating Los Golpeadores (Dragón Bane and Alpha Wolf) to retain the GHC Tag Team Championship, and Daga defeating Hajime Ohara to retain the GHC Junior Heavyweight Championship.

== Background ==
=== Storylines ===
The event featured eight professional wrestling matches that resulted from scripted storylines, where wrestlers portrayed villains, heroes, or less distinguishable characters in the scripted events that built tension and culminated in a wrestling match or series of matches.

=== Event ===
The event started with two preshow bouts broadcast live on Noah's YouTube channel. In the first one, LJ Cleary picked up a victory over Ninja Mack and Alejandro in a three-way bout. In the second preshow match, Manabu Soya, Masa Kitamiya, Daiki Inaba, Hayata and Eita defeated Go Shiozaki, Mohammed Yone, Akitoshi Saito, Atsushi Kotoge and Hi69 in ten-man tag team action.

In the first main card match, Naomichi Marufuji, Takashi Sugiura and Ulka Sasaki defeated Saxon Huxley, Timothy Thatcher and Shuhei Taniguchi in six-man tag team action. Next up, Kaito Kiyomiya and NJPW's Ryohei Oiwa outmatched Yoshinari Ogawa and Yu Owada in tag team action. In the fifth bout of the event, Jake Lee and GHC Junior Heavyweight Tag Team Champions Yo-Hey and Tadasuke defeated Kazuyuki Fujita, Shuji Kondo and Junta Miyawaki in six-man tag team action. Next up, Daga defeated Hajime Ohara to secure the third consecutive defense of the GHC Junior Heavyweight Championship in that respective reign. In the semi main event, GHC National Champion Jack Morris and Anthony Greene defeated Dragón Bane and Alpha Wolf to secure the third consecutive defense of the GHC Tag Team Championship in that respective reign.

In the main event, El Hijo de Dr. Wagner Jr. defeated Kenoh to win the GHC Heavyweight Championship, ending the latter's reign at 99 days and two successful defenses.

== Results ==
No.	Results	Stipulations	Times
1^{P}	LJ Cleary defeated Ninja Mack and Alejandro	Three-way match	9:34
2^{P}	Manabu Soya, Masa Kitamiya, Daiki Inaba, Hayata and Eita defeated Team Noah (Go Shiozaki, Mohammed Yone, Akitoshi Saito, Atsushi Kotoge and Hi69)	Ten-man tag team match	15:08
3	Naomichi Marufuji, Takashi Sugiura and Ulka Sasaki defeated Real (Saxon Huxley, Timothy Thatcher and Shuhei Taniguchi)	Six-man tag team match	12:43
4	Kaito Kiyomiya and Ryohei Oiwa defeated Yoshinari Ogawa and Yu Owada	Tag team match	13:31
5	Good Looking Guys (Jake Lee, Yo-Hey and Tadasuke) defeated Kazuyuki Fujita, Shuji Kondo and Junta Miyawaki	Six-man tag team match	15:42
6	Daga (c) defeated Hajime Ohara	Singles match for the GHC Junior Heavyweight Championship	15:40
7	Good Looking Guys (Jack Morris and Anthony Greene) (c) defeated Los Golpeadores (Dragón Bane and Alpha Wolf)	Tag team match for the GHC Tag Team Championship	21:46
8	El Hijo de Dr. Wagner Jr. defeated Kenoh (c)	Singles match for the GHC Heavyweight Championship	29:37
(c) / – the champion(s) heading into the match; P / – the match was broadcast on the pre-show
