= GHC Heavyweight Championship =

Professional wrestling world championship

- Current championship design (since 2019)

Details
- Promotion: CyberFight
- Brand: Pro Wrestling Noah
- Date established: April 15, 2001
- Current champion: Tetsuya Naito
- Date won: August 9, 2026
Statistics
- First champion: Mitsuharu Misawa
- Most reigns: Go Shiozaki (5 reigns)
- Longest reign: Kenta Kobashi (735 days)
- Shortest reign: Kenoh (1 day)
- Oldest champion: Keiji Muto (58 years, 51 days)
- Youngest champion: Kaito Kiyomiya (22 years, 152 days)
- Heaviest champion: Takeshi Morishima (145 kg (320 lb))
- Lightest champion: Kenta (81 kg (179 lb))

The Global Honored Crown (GHC) Heavyweight Championship (Japanese: GHCヘビー級王座, Hepburn: GHC Hebī-kyū Ōza) is the professional wrestling world heavyweight championship created and promoted by Japanese promotion Pro Wrestling Noah, which was merged with DDT Pro-Wrestling to form CyberFight in 2020. It is one of CyberFight's two top men's world titles, alongside the KO-D Openweight Championship in DDT. The title was also defended on Impact Wrestling which has a working relationship with Pro Wrestling Noah. Though its name implies a particular weight class, it has been periodically held by junior heavyweights, including Yoshinari Ogawa, Kenta, Naomichi Marufuji, Katsuhiko Nakajima and Kenoh. The current champion is Tetsuya Naito, who is in his first reign. He won the title by defeating Shane Haste at Legacy Rise: Night 3 on August 9, 2026.

== History ==
The GHC Heavyweight Championship was created in 2001, when Noah held a 16-man tournament to crown the first champion over its month-long, 18-event Navigation for the Victory GHC tour. The tour ran from March 18 to April 15.

Round 1
March 18, Tokyo
Mitsuharu Misawa	Pin
Akitoshi Saito	12:26
March 21, Sagamihara
Masao Inoue	14:18
Yoshinari Ogawa	Pin
April 2, Beppu
Takeshi Morishima	14:33
Takeshi Rikio	Pin
April 1, Fukuoka
Jun Akiyama	Pin
Takao Omori	22:49
March 25, Kyoto
Akira Taue	10:40
Vader	Pin
March 29, Kagoshima
Daisuke Ikeda	Pin
Tamon Honda	15:16
March 22, Tokyo
Yoshihiro Takayama	Pin
Jun Izumida	8:22
March 30, Kumamoto
Scorpio	13:06
Kentaro Shiga	Pin

Round 2
April 4, Okayama
Mitsuharu Misawa	Pin
Yoshinari Ogawa	19:44
April 8, Tokyo
Takeshi Rikio	4:02
Jun Akiyama	Sub
April 6, Ishikawa
Vader	Pin
Daisuke Ikeda	7:15
April 3, Uwajima
Yoshihiro Takayama	Pin
Kentaro Shiga	7:16

Semi-finals
April 11, Hiroshima
Mitsuharu Misawa	Pin
Jun Akiyama	1:30 (Note: Akiyama and Misawa were originally both counted out, but the match was restarted.)
April 12, Osaka
Vader	9:24
Yoshihiro Takayama	DQ

Final
April 15, Tokyo
Mitsuharu Misawa	Pin
Yoshihiro Takayama	21:12

=== Belt design ===
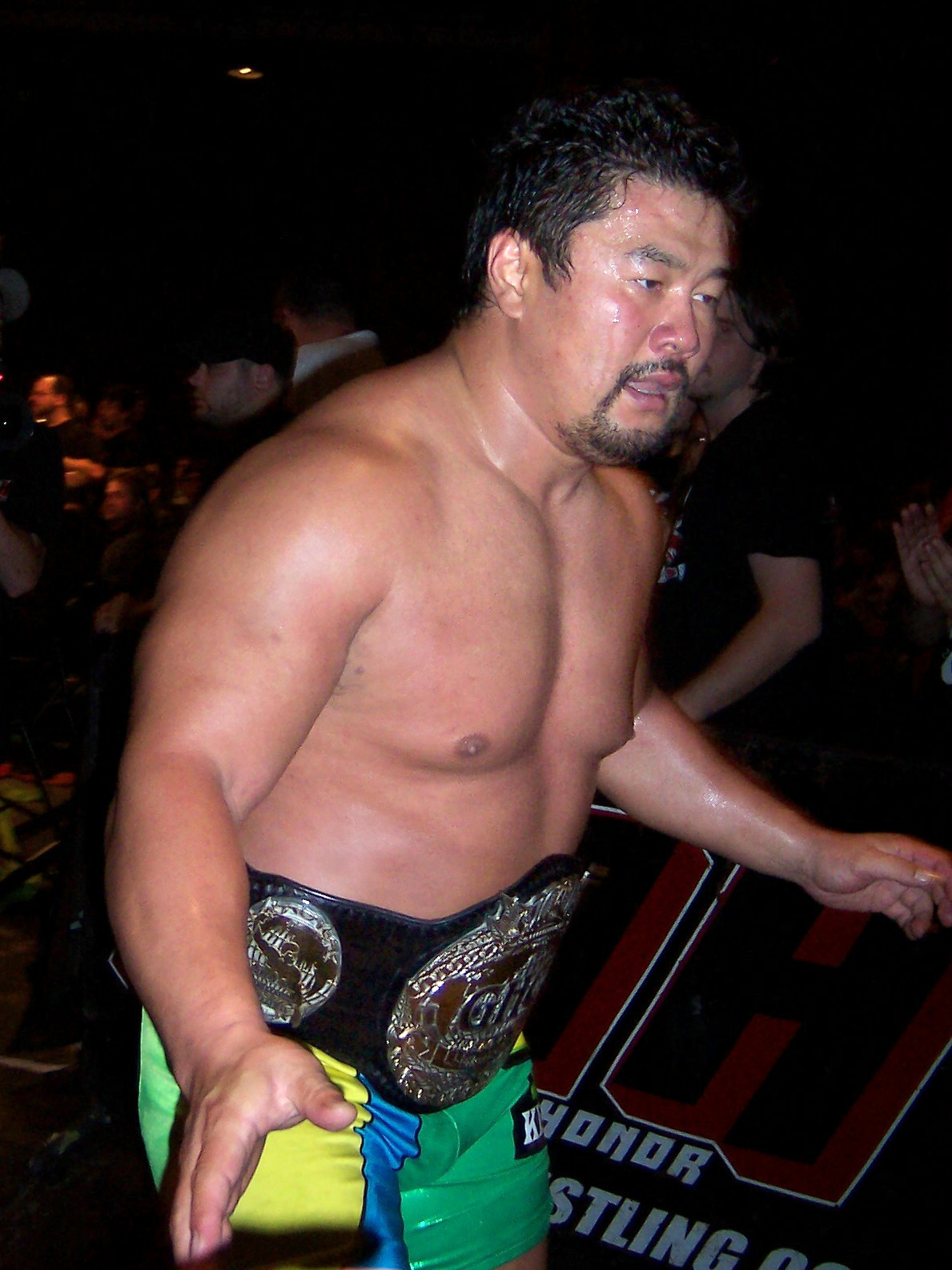
Kensuke Sasaki with the first design of the title in 2008

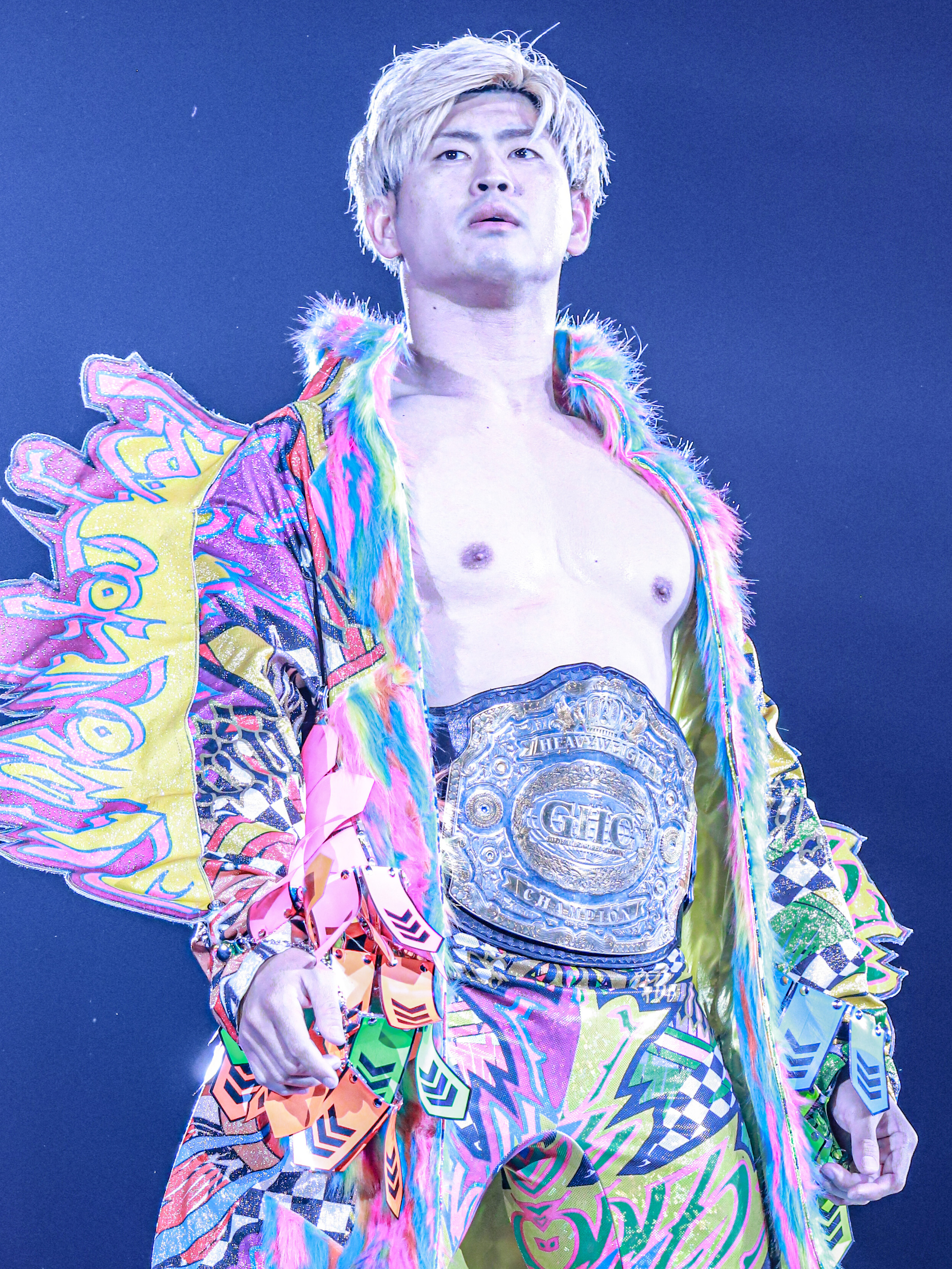
Kaito Kiyomiya with the second design of the title in 2023.

The first version of the title was introduced in 2001, one year after the promotion's debut, and its centerpiece featured a circular main plate in gold, adorned with intricate engravings, and crowned by a large "GHC" inscription at the top. Below it, the words "Heavyweight Champion" were prominently displayed, encased in a banner-like design, and the middle, there’s an earth-shaped globe, symbolizing NOAH's governing body, the Global Honored Crown. The main plate is flanked by two side plates on either side, each carrying additional details, including NOAH's emblematic logo.

The second version was introduced in 2019, with the centerpiece of this version being broad, gold-plated main plate. At the top of the plate, bold "GHC" initials are engraved in a prominent and embossed style. Just top and bottom, “Heavyweight and Champion” were displayed in a subtle yet bold font, framing the title's gravity with elegance. The globe at the center was an enhanced feature, rendered with a three-dimensional effect that highlights the continents. The side plates, two on each side of the main plate, contribute further to the belt’s distinguished look.

== Reigns ==
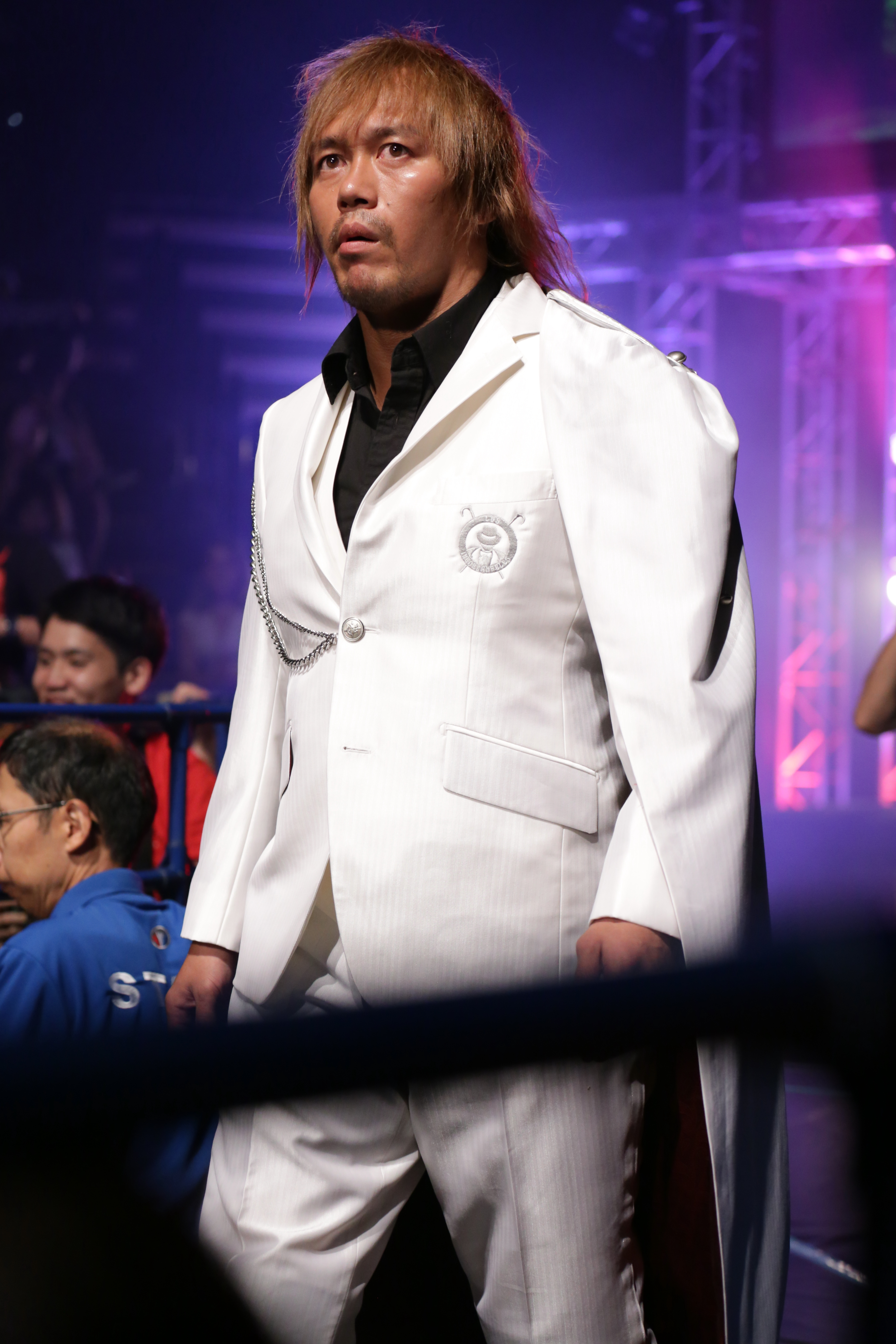
Current champion Tetsuya Naito

As of November 17, 2026, there have been a total of 51 reigns shared between 28 different champions. Mitsuharu Misawa was the inaugural champion. Kenta Kobashi has the longest reign at 735 days, while Kenoh held the title for only one day, making it the shortest reign in the title's history. Keiji Muto is the oldest title holder at 58 years and 51 days, while Kaito Kiyomiya is the youngest at 22 years and 152 days.

Tetsuya Naito is the current champion in his first reign. He defeated Shane Haste at Legacy Rise: Night 3 in Tokyo, Japan, on August 9, 2026.

Key
No.	Overall reign number
Reign	Reign number for the specific champion
Days	Number of days held
Defenses	Number of successful defenses
+	Current reign is changing daily

No.	Champion	Championship change			Reign statistics			Notes	Ref.
No.	Champion	Date	Event	Location	Reign	Days	Defenses	Notes	Ref.
1	Mitsuharu Misawa	April 15, 2001	Navigation for the Victory	Tokyo, Japan	1	103	1	Defeated Yoshihiro Takayama in a tournament final.	
2	Jun Akiyama	July 27, 2001	Accomplish Our First Navigation	Tokyo, Japan	1	254	3		
3	Yoshinari Ogawa	April 7, 2002	Encountering Navigation Final Day: Come and Watch in Ariake	Tokyo, Japan	1	153	2		
4	Yoshihiro Takayama	September 7, 2002	Navigation Over the Date Line	Osaka, Japan	1	16	0		
5	Mitsuharu Misawa	September 23, 2002	Great Voyage '02	Tokyo, Japan	2	159	1		
6	Kenta Kobashi	March 1, 2003	Navigate for Evolution '03 Final Day	Tokyo, Japan	1	735	13		
7	Takeshi Rikio	March 5, 2005	Navigate for Evolution '05 Final Day	Tokyo, Japan	1	245	3		
8	Akira Taue	November 5, 2005	3rd Great Voyage '05	Tokyo, Japan	1	78	1		
9	Jun Akiyama	January 22, 2006	The First Navigation '06 Final Day	Tokyo, Japan	2	230	2		
10	Naomichi Marufuji	September 9, 2006	Shiny Navigation '06 Final Day	Tokyo, Japan	1	92	2		
11	Mitsuharu Misawa	December 10, 2006	Great Voyage '06	Tokyo, Japan	3	448	7		
12	Takeshi Morishima	March 2, 2008	The Second Navig.'08 Final Day	Tokyo, Japan	1	188	2		
13	Kensuke Sasaki	September 6, 2008	Shiny Navig.'08 Final Day	Tokyo, Japan	1	176	2		
14	Jun Akiyama	March 1, 2009	The Second Navig.'09 Final Day	Tokyo, Japan	3	105	1		
—	Vacated	June 14, 2009	—	—	—	—	—	Vacated due to Akiyama suffering a lumbar disc herniation.	
15	Go Shiozaki	June 14, 2009	Southern Navig.'09	Fukuoka, Japan	1	175	1	Defeated Takeshi Rikio to win the vacant title.	
16	Takashi Sugiura	December 6, 2009	Winter Navig.'09 Final Day	Tokyo, Japan	1	581	14		
17	Go Shiozaki	July 10, 2011	Great Voyage 2011 in Tokyo Vol. 3	Tokyo, Japan	2	196	3		
18	Takeshi Morishima	January 22, 2012	Great Voyage 2012 in Osaka	Osaka, Japan	2	371	8		
19	Kenta	January 27, 2013	Great Voyage 2013 in Osaka	Osaka, Japan	1	343	9		
20	Takeshi Morishima	January 5, 2014	New Year Navig.2014	Tokyo, Japan	3	34	0		
21	Yuji Nagata	February 8, 2014	The Second Navig.2014 Opening Day	Tokyo, Japan	1	147	4		
22	Naomichi Marufuji	July 5, 2014	Great Voyage 2014 in Tokyo Vol. 2	Tokyo, Japan	2	253	6		
23	Minoru Suzuki	March 15, 2015	Great Voyage 2015 in Tokyo	Tokyo, Japan	1	283	4	On August 9, 2015, Suzuki successfully defended the title against Mio Shirai at a Pro Wrestling Wave event. The defense was not recognized by Noah, who officially only recognize four of his five defenses.	
24	Naomichi Marufuji	December 23, 2015	Destiny 2015	Tokyo, Japan	3	39	0		
25	Takashi Sugiura	January 31, 2016	Great Voyage 2016 in Yokohama	Yokohama, Japan	2	118	1		
26	Go Shiozaki	May 28, 2016	Great Voyage 2016 in Osaka	Osaka, Japan	3	63	1		
27	Takashi Sugiura	July 30, 2016	10th NTV G+ Cup Junior Heavyweight Tag League	Tokyo, Japan	3	85	2	This was a lumberjack match.	
28	Katsuhiko Nakajima	October 23, 2016	Great Voyage 2016 in Yokohama Vol. 2	Yokohama, Japan	1	307	7		
29	Eddie Edwards	August 26, 2017	Summer Navig.2017 Vol. 2	Tokyo, Japan	1	118	2		
30	Kenoh	December 22, 2017	Winter Navig. 2017	Tokyo, Japan	1	79	2		
31	Takashi Sugiura	March 11, 2018	Great Voyage 2018 in Yokohama	Yokohama, Japan	4	280	6		
32	Kaito Kiyomiya	December 16, 2018	Great Voyage in Yokohama Vol. 2	Yokohama, Japan	1	384	6		
33	Go Shiozaki	January 4, 2020	Korakuen Hall Day 1 New Sunrise	Tokyo, Japan	4	405	6		
34	Keiji Muto	February 12, 2021	Destination 2021	Tokyo, Japan	1	114	2		
35	Naomichi Marufuji	June 6, 2021	CyberFight Festival 2021	Saitama, Japan	4	126	2		
36	Katsuhiko Nakajima	October 10, 2021	Grand Square 2021 in Osaka	Osaka, Japan	2	136	4		
37	Kazuyuki Fujita	February 23, 2022	Gain Control 2022 in Nagoya	Nagoya, Japan	1	63	1		
—	Vacated	April 27, 2022	—	—	—	—	—	Vacated due to Fujita having tested positive for COVID-19.	
38	Go Shiozaki	April 30, 2022	Majestic 2022	Tokyo, Japan	5	43	0	Defeated Kaito Kiyomiya to win the vacant title.	
39	Satoshi Kojima	June 12, 2022	CyberFight Festival 2022	Saitama, Japan	1	34	0		
40	Kenoh	July 16, 2022	Destination 2022	Tokyo, Japan	2	71	0		
41	Kaito Kiyomiya	September 25, 2022	Grand Ship in Nagoya 2022	Nagoya, Japan	2	175	4		
42	Jake Lee	March 19, 2023	Great Voyage in Yokohama 2023	Yokohama, Japan	1	223	4		
43	Kenoh	October 28, 2023	Demolition Stage in Fukuoka	Fukuoka, Japan	3	99	2		
44	Hijo del Dr. Wagner Jr.	February 4, 2024	Cross Over in Sendai 2024	Sendai, Japan	1	90	1		
45	Kaito Kiyomiya	May 4, 2024	Wrestle Magic	Tokyo, Japan	3	242	7		
46	Ozawa	January 1, 2025	The New Year 2025	Tokyo, Japan	1	199	6		
47	Kenoh	July 19, 2025	New Departure 2025 (Night 1)	Tokyo, Japan	4	1	0		
48	Kenta	July 20, 2025	New Departure 2025 (Night 2)	Tokyo, Japan	2	111	2		
49	Yoshiki Inamura	November 8, 2025	Star Navigation 2025 (Night 3)	Tokyo, Japan	1	175	6		
50	Shane Haste	May 2, 2026	Spring Mayhem	Tokyo, Japan	1	99	3		
51	Tetsuya Naito	August 9, 2026	Legacy Rise (Night 3)	Tokyo, Japan	1	100+	2		

== Combined reigns ==
As of November 17, 2026.

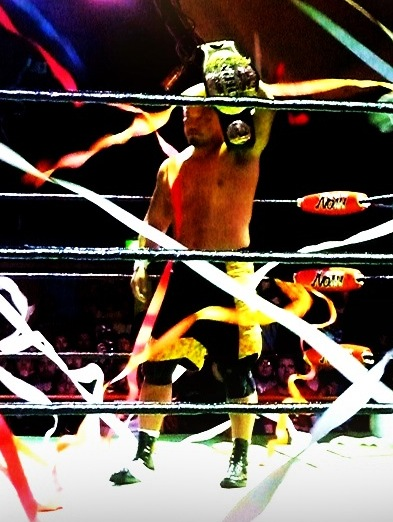
Four-time champion Takashi Sugiura holds the records for longest combined reign (1,064 days), most defenses in one reign (14), and most combined defenses (23)

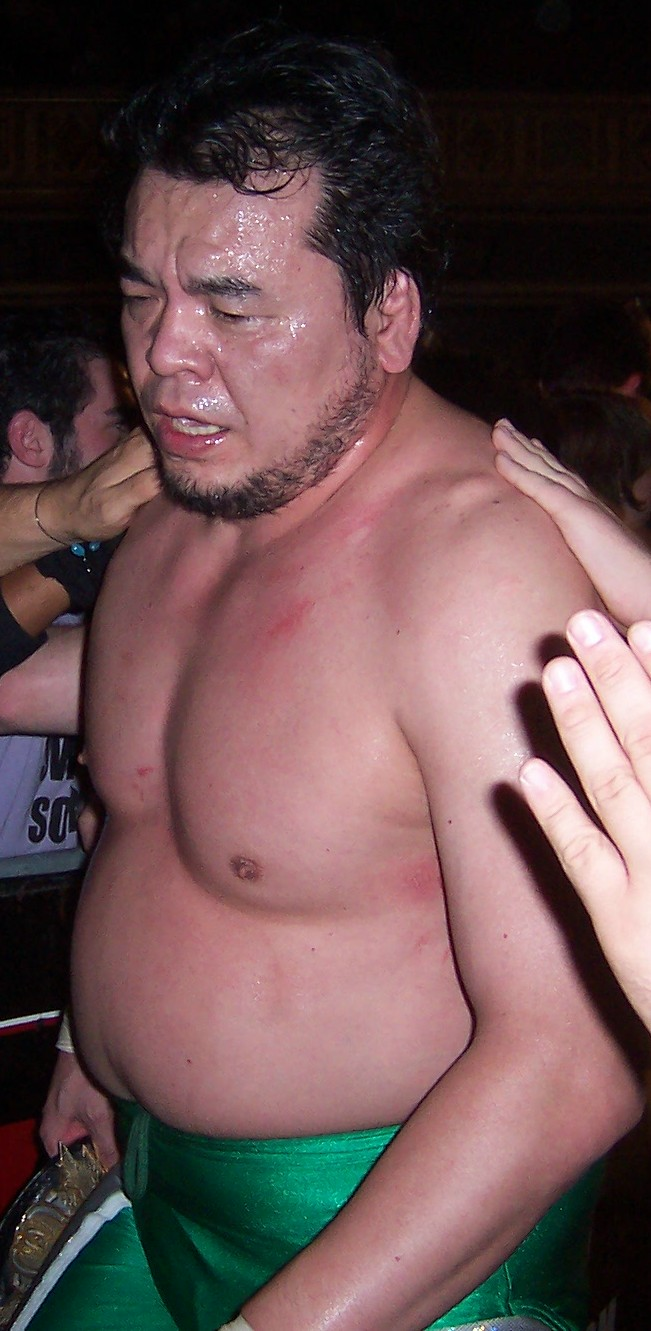
Inaugural and three-time champion Mitsuharu Misawa

†	Indicates the current champion

Rank	Wrestler	No. of reigns	Combined defenses	Combined days
1	Takashi Sugiura	4	23	1,064
2	Go Shiozaki	5	11	882
3	Kaito Kiyomiya	3	17	801
4	Kenta Kobashi	1	13	735
5	Mitsuharu Misawa	3	9	710
6	Takeshi Morishima	3	10	593
7	Jun Akiyama	3	6	589
8	Naomichi Marufuji	4	10	510
9	Kenta	2	11	454
10	Katsuhiko Nakajima	2	11	443
11	Minoru Suzuki	1	4	283
12	Kenoh	4	4	250
13	Takeshi Rikio	1	3	245
14	Jake Lee	1	4	223
15	Ozawa	1	6	199
16	Kensuke Sasaki	1	2	176
17	Yoshiki Inamura	1	6	175
18	Yoshinari Ogawa	1	2	153
19	Yuji Nagata	1	4	147
20	Eddie Edwards	1	2	118
21	Keiji Muto	1	2	114
22	Tetsuya Naito †	1	2	100+
23	Shane Haste	1	3	99
24	Hijo del de Dr. Wagner Jr.	1	1	90
25	Akira Taue	1	1	78
26	Kazuyuki Fujita	1	1	63
27	Satoshi Kojima	1	0	34
28	Yoshihiro Takayama	1	0	16
