= Kaito Kiyomiya =

Japanese professional wrestler (born 1996)

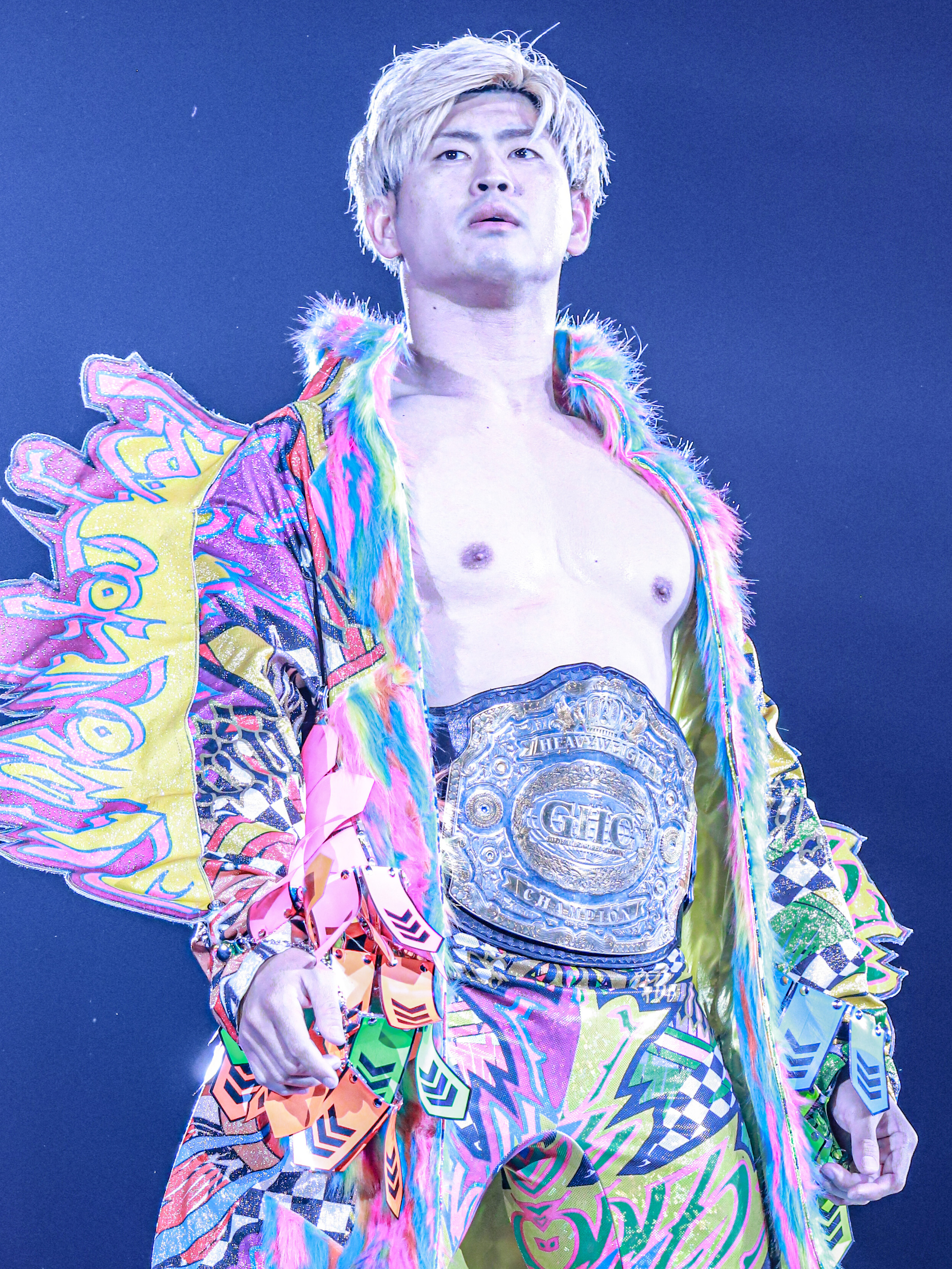
- Kiyomiya in January 2023

Personal information
- Born: July 17, 1996 (age 30) Saitama, Saitama, Japan

Professional wrestling career
- Ring name: Kaito Kiyomiya
- Billed height: 1.80 m (5 ft 11 in)
- Billed weight: 98 kg (216 lb)
- Trained by: Yoshinari Ogawa; Daisuke Harada; Atsushi Kotoge; Keiji Muto; Scott D'Amore
- Debut: December 9, 2015

Kaito Kiyomiya (清宮 海斗, Kiyomiya Kaito; born July 17, 1996) is a Japanese professional wrestler. He is signed to Pro Wrestling Noah, where he is former three-time GHC Heavyweight Champion and former two-time GHC Tag Team Champion. He also makes appearances for partner promotion New Japan Pro-Wrestling (NJPW).

== Early life ==
Kiyomiya grew up a lifelong fan of professional wrestling, citing Mitsuharu Misawa as his biggest inspiration. Kiyomiya wore green trunks during his early career as tribute to Misawa.

== Professional wrestling career ==
=== Pro Wrestling Noah (2015–present) ===
==== Early career (2015–2016) ====
Kiyomiya began training at the Pro Wrestling Noah dojo immediately after graduating from high school in March 2015 and made his debut on December 9, losing to Hitoshi Kumano at Winter Navigation. Kiyomiya faced Kumano again the next day, losing once again. Kiyomiya would go winless throughout the rest of 2015, losing to Taiji Ishimori, Quiet Storm, Genba Hirayanagi and Yoshinari Ogawa. He teamed with Yoshihiro Takayama at Destiny 2015 in a losing effort against Ogawa and Kumano.

Kiyomiya would remain winless until March 17, when he teamed with Mitsuhiro Kitamiya and Hitoshi Kumano to defeat Kyu Mogami, Ayato Yoshida and Go Asakawa at a Taka and Taichi Produce show for his first professional win. On that same show, Kiyomiya participated in a battle royal, which was eventually won by Takashi Iizuka. On March 27, at We Are Suzuki-Gun 2, Kiyomiya teamed with Hitoshi Kumano to defeat NJPW's Teruaki Kanemitsu and Hirai Kawato. On May 19, Kiyomiya debuted for NJPW at Lion's Gate Project 2, defeating Kawato once again, this time in a singles match. The first big win of Kiyomiya's career would come at We Are Suzuki-Gun 3 on June 18, where he outlasted eleven other wrestlers to win Minoru Suzuki's 48th Birthday Anniversary Royal Rumble Match, awarding him the right to a match against Suzuki. The two wrestled to a no-contest on July 16.

Kiyomiya debuted for the Kaientai Dojo promotion on July 23, teaming with Go Asakawa in a loss to Taishi Takizawa and Kotaro Yoshino. Kiyomiya teamed with the ace of Pro Wrestling Noah, Naomichi Marufuji on August 24, defeating Minoru Suzuki and Takashi Sugiura. Kiyomiya wrestled again for NJPW on September 1 at Lion's Gate Project 3, representing Noah alongside Masa Kitamiya, Katsuhiko Nakajima, Maybach Taniguchi, and Go Shiozaki in a ten-man tag team match where they were defeated by NJPW's Hiroyoshi Tenzan, Satoshi Kojima, Yuji Nagata, Manabu Nakanishi and Katsuyori Shibata. Kiyomiya was defeated in a rematch against Minoru Suzuki on October 23. Kiyomiya entered the 2016 Global League, finishing last in his block with zero wins and zero points.

==== Excursion and return (2017–2018) ====
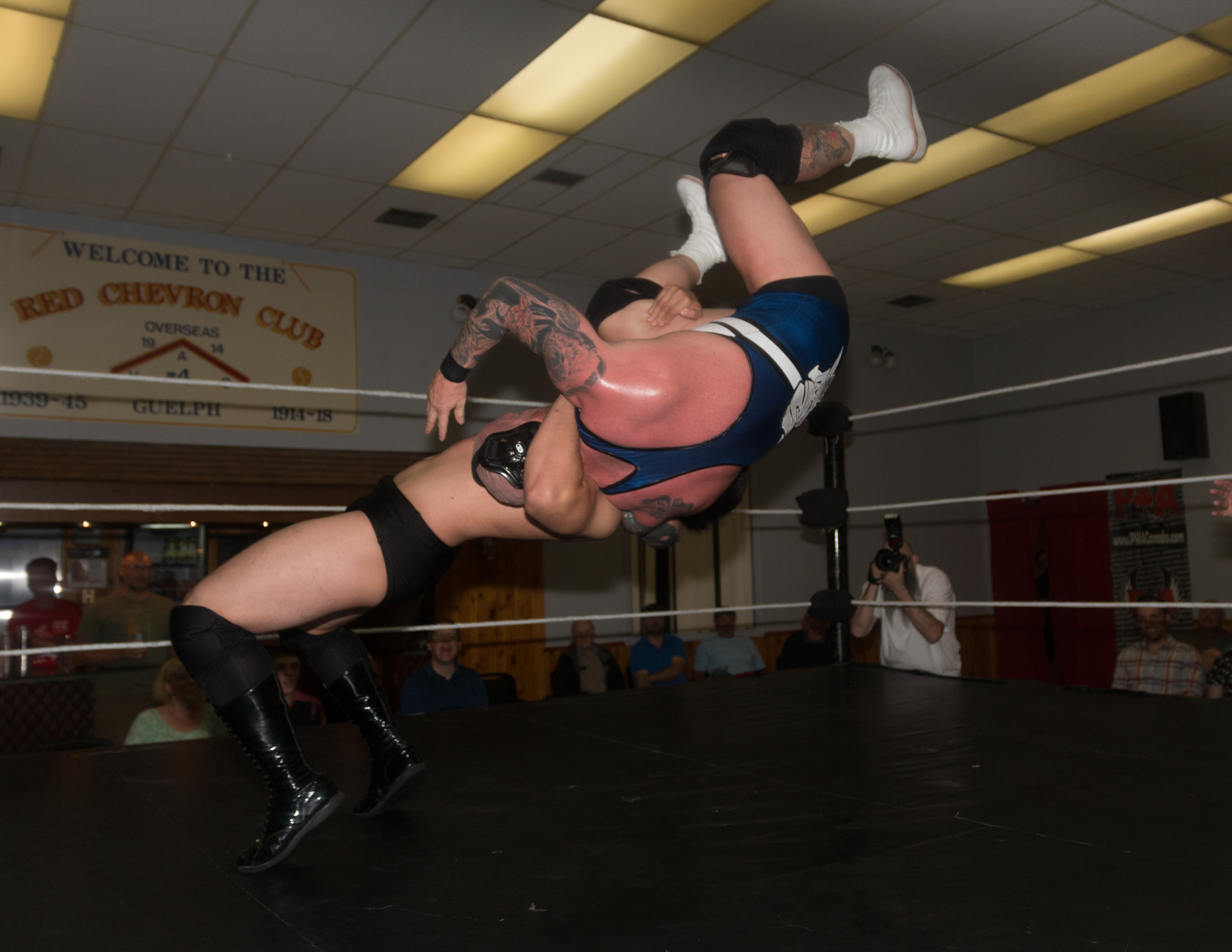
Kiyomiya (in black trunks) executing a fisherman's suplex on Josh Alexander in 2017

On January 9, 2017, Coming of Age Day in Japan, Kiyomiya unsuccessfully faced Takashi Sugiura in a singles match, however, afterwards, Sugiura, impressed with Kiyomiya, offered him a handshake and the chance to form an alliance. Kiyomiya accepted, stating that he is ready to take the next step in his career, aligning himself with Sugiura and turning heel in the process. The following day, Kiyomiya debuted a new all black ring attire along with a more vicious ring style and ruthless attitude in a loss to Hi69. Kiyomiya, now a fully fledged heel, teamed with Sugiura on February 24 to defeat GHC Tag Team Champions Kenoh and Masa Kitamiya after Kenoh turned on Kitamiya to align himself with Sugiura and Kiyomiya. Kiyomiya teamed with Takuya Nomura in the 2017 Global Tag League. The team finished with four points after defeating Robbie E and Bram by forfeit and Cody Hall and Randy Reign on the final day of the league to prevent Hall and Reign from entering a three-way tie for first place. On May 4, Kiyomiya was pinned by Nomura, and refused a handshake following the match.

On June 5, 2017, it was announced by Kiyomiya that he would be going to Canada on a learning excursion. His last match before leaving took place on June 25, where he was defeated by Kenoh. Kaito travelled to Windsor, Ontario, Canada in a talent exchange with Border City Wrestling, where he was trained by Scott D'Amore at the Can-Am Wrestling School (BCW's Sheldon Jean went to NOAH in exchange). During his time in Canada, he worked in the Southwestern Ontario independent circuit with the likes of Smash Wrestling, Destiny Wrestling, BattleArts, and D'Amore's own Border City Wrestling. In November 2017, he took part in TV tapings for IMPACT Wrestling in Ottawa, Ontario, appearing in three matches for IMPACT Xplosion.

Kiyomiya returned from his excursion on December 22, 2017, confronting and challenging Kenoh after he had defeated Eddie Edwards to win the GHC Heavyweight Championship. Afterwards, Kiyomiya was named as Kenoh's first challenger for the GHC Heavyweight Championship. Kiyomiya lost by knockout on January 6, 2018. After the match, Kenoh and Takashi Sugiura turned their back on Kiyomiya, attacking him, but he was saved by the whole NOAH roster, specifically Go Shiozaki, who helped him to the back, turning Kiyomiya face in the process. On April 11, Kiyomiya and Shiozaki defeated Kenoh and Takashi Sugiura to win the 2018 Global Tag League. A few weeks later on April 29, the two defeated The Aggression (Katsuhiko Nakajima and Masa Kitamiya) to win the GHC Tag Team Championship, but lost the titles back to them exactly one month later on May 29.

==== GHC Heavyweight Champion (2018–2020) ====
From October 30 to November 25, 2018, Kiyomiya participated in his first Global League since 2016 where he finished with a record of four wins and three losses to advance to the finals, where he was originally scheduled to face Naomichi Marufuji, however, Marufuji was forced to pull out due to injury and was replaced by runner up Katsuhiko Nakajima. Kiyomiya defeated Nakajima in the final to win the 2018 Global League.

On December 16, Kiyomiya challenged and defeated Takashi Sugiura to win the GHC Heavyweight Championship for the first time in his career, making him the youngest ever champion in the process at the age of 22. Kiyomiya made his first defense against Kenoh, on January 6. Masa Kitamiya won a Number One Contender match against Atsushi Kotoge on January 20, but was defeated by the Heavyweight Champion on February 1. After the match, Naomichi Marufuji came to the ring and challenged Kaito Kiyomiya, and the champion accepted. The match happened on March 10, in the new ring, and Kiyomiya successfully defended his title. Kenoh appeared after the match and invited Kiyomiya to be his tag team partner to Global Tag League, and the champion accepted. Kiyomiya and Kenoh finished third in the tournament with a record of 4 wins and 3 losses, earning them 9 points. Kiyomiya successfully defended the GHC Heavyweight Championship against Takashi Sugiura on June 9. He would successfully defend his title two more times, once against Kenoh at Noah The Best 2019 in the Ryogoku Kokugikan on November 2. At New Sunrise on January 4, 2020, Kiyomiya would finally lose the GHC Heavyweight Championship to Go Shiozaki, ending his reign after 384 days. Kiyomiya's reign was the second-longest for a first-time title holder, second only to Kenta Kobashi's at 735 days.

==== Championship pursuits (2021–present) ====
In April, Kiyomiya teamed with Shuhei Taniguchi in the Global Tag League. The duo competed in the A Block, but failed to advance to the finals, after scoring just 2 points. In September, Kiyomiya participated in the N-1 Victory, topping the A-Block with 7 points. Kiyomiya lost in the finals to Katsuhiko Nakajima. In November, at NOAH The Chronicle Vol. 4, Kiyomiya faced Knoh for the GHC National Championship, but was defeated. The following month at NOAH The Gift In Nagoya, Kiyomiya teamed with Yoshiki Inamura to challenge GHC Tag Team Champions, Kazushi Sakuraba and Takashi Sugiura, in a losing effort.

In March 2021 at NOAH Great Voyage In Fukuoka, Kiyomiya challenged Keiji Muto for the GHC Heavyweight Championship, but was defeated. In July, Kiyomiya and Masa Kitamiya defeated Katsuhiko Nakajima and Manabu Soya to win the GHC Tag Team Championships. In September, Kiyomiya entered the 2021 N-1 Victory, competing in the A Block once again. Kiyomiya finished at the top of his block, thus advancing to the semi-finals. In the semi-final round, Kiyomiya was eliminated by Kenoh. In November at Demolition stage in Yokohama, Kiyomiya and Kitamiya lost the GHC Tag Team titles to Keiji Muto and Naomichi Marufuji, ending their reign at 114 days.

Kiyomiya started out 2022 by challenging Kenoh for the GHC National Championship at Noah The New Year 2022, in a losing effort. In March, Kiyomiya competed in a tournament to crown the new GHC Tag Team Champions, after the belts were vacated. Kiyomiya teamed with Daiki Inaba, defeating Masaaki Mochizuki and Naomichi Marufuji in the semi-finals, but losing to Hideki Suzuki and Takashi Sugiura in the finals. On April 30 at Noah Majestic 2022, Kiyomiya faced Go Shiozaki for the vacant GHC Heavyweight Championship but was defeated. On June 12 at CyberFight Festival 2022, Kiyomiya teamed with Daisuke Harada and Yo-Hey against Stinger (Yoshinari Ogawa and Hayata) and Rob Van Dam, in a losing effort. In August, Kiyomiya entered the N-1 Victory once again, participating in the B Block. Kiyomiya topped the block with 10 points, advancing to the tournament finals. In the finals, Kiyomiya defeated Hideki Suzuki to win his 2nd N-1 Victory. At Noah Grand Ship In Nagoya 2022, Kiyomiya defeated Kenoh to win his 2nd GHC Heavyweight Championship. On October 30 at Noah Ariake Triumph 2022, Kiyomiya made his first title defence, defeating Kazuyuki Fujita. The following month at Noah Global Honored Crown 2022, Kiyomiya successfully defended the title against Timothy Thatcher.

In the new year, Kiyomiya defeated Kenoh in a rematch, to make his third successful title defence at Noah The New Year 2023 on January 1. On February 12, following another successful GHC Heavyweight Championship defence against Jack Morris, Kazuchika Okada attacked Kiyomiya, further escalating their rivalry that stems from a tag match at NJPW's Wrestle Kingdom 17. The match between the two champions took place at Keiji Muto Grand Final Pro-Wrestling "Last" Love, where Okada defeated Kiyomiya.

On March 19 at Noah Great Voyage in Yokohama 2023, Kiyomiya lost the GHC Heavyweight Championship to Jake Lee, ending his second reign at 175 days. On June 9, Kiyomiya wrestled at All Together: Again, which was a joint show between Pro Wrestling Noah (NOAH), New Japan Pro-Wrestling (NJPW) and All Japan Pro Wrestling (AJPW), in tribute to the late Antonio Inoki, who had recently passed away. Kiyomiya wrestled in the main event, teaming with Hiroshi Tanahashi (NJPW) and Kento Miyahara (AJPW), in a losing effort to Kenoh (NOAH), Yuma Aoyagi (AJPW) and Kazuchika Okada (NJPW).

On January 1 at Noah The New Year 2025, Kiyomiya lost the GHC Heavyweight Championship to Ozawa, ending his third reign at 242 days.

=== New Japan Pro-Wrestling (2022–present) ===
On January 8, 2022 on Night 3 of Wrestle Kingdom 16, Kiyomiya made his New Japan Pro-Wrestling debut teaming with Keiji Muto in a losing effort to NJPW's, Hiroshi Tanahashi and Kazuchika Okada.

Kiyomiya made another NJPW Wrestle Kingdom appearance, on Night 2 of Wrestle Kingdom 17, teaming with Yoshiki Inamura in a tag-team match against IWGP World Heavyweight Champion Kazuchika Okada and Togi Makabe. During the match, Kiyomiya, who was not the legal man for his team, entered the ring and kicked Okada in the head, causing Okada to have a small cut on his forehead. A furious Okada viciously attacked Kiyomiya in the ringside area. The two men continued to brawl, despite being pulled apart by their respective tag-team partners, causing the match to end in a no contest and starting a heated inter-promotional rivalry between the two World Champions. In July, Kiyomiya was announced to be participating in NJPW's 2023 G1 Climax tournament representing NOAH, instead of competing in NOAH's N-1 Victory. Kiyomiya competed in the A-Block, finishing with 6 points, thus failing to advance to the quarterfinals. Kiyomiya participated in the 2023 World Tag League, teaming with Ryohei Oiwa in the A-Block, the duo finished with 4 points, thus failing to advance to the semi-finals.

On January 4, 2024 at Wrestle Kingdom 18, Kiyomiya teamed with Shota Umino, in a losing effort against House of Torture (Evil and Ren Narita).

== Away from wrestling ==
He joined SASUKE 40 at 27 December 2022.He has given number 3952. He failed Stage 1 at Silk Slider.

== Championships and accomplishments ==
- Dragongate
  - Open the Twin Gate Championship (1 time) – with Alejandro
- ESPN
  - Ranked No. 21 of the 30 best Pro Wrestlers Under 30 in 2023
- Pro Wrestling Illustrated
  - Ranked No. 36 of the top 500 singles wrestlers in the PWI 500 in 2020
- Pro Wrestling Noah
  - GHC Heavyweight Championship (3 times)
  - GHC Tag Team Championship (2 times) – with Go Shiozaki (1) and Masa Kitamiya (1)
  - Global League (2018)
  - Global Tag League (2018) – with Go Shiozaki
  - N-1 Victory (2022, 2024)
  - Victory Challenge Tag League (2024) – with Ryohei Oiwa
- Tokyo Sports
  - Fighting Spirit Award (2018, 2019, 2024)
