= Katsuhiko Nakajima =

Japanese professional wrestler (born 1988)

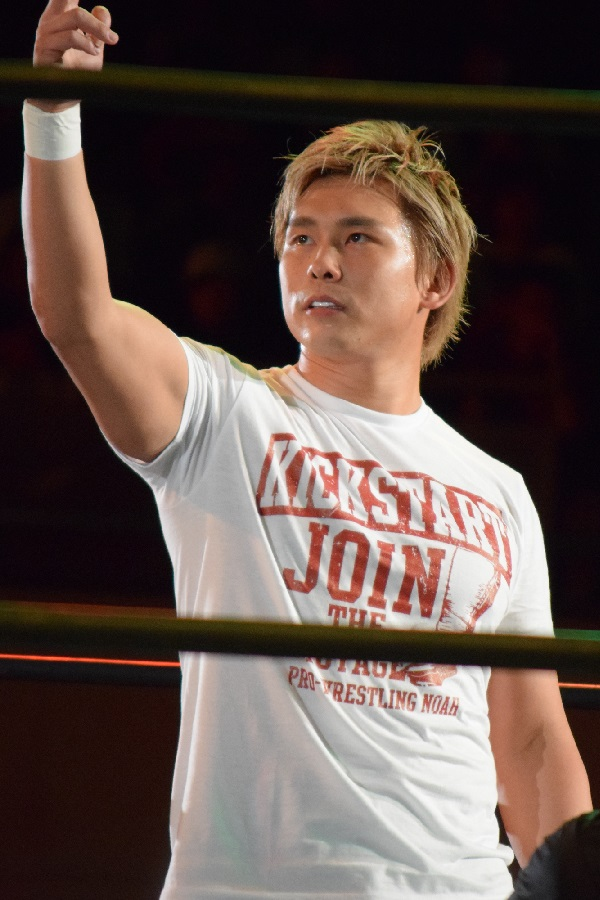
- Nakajima in 2016

Personal information
- Born: March 11, 1988 (age 38) Fukuoka, Fukuoka, Japan
- Spouse: Ayuri Iisaku (m. 2012)

Professional wrestling career
- Ring name(s): Christmas Tree; Katsuhiko Nakajima
- Billed height: 1.75 m (5 ft 9 in)
- Billed weight: 95 kg (209 lb)
- Trained by: Riki Choshu; Kensuke Sasaki; Masa Saito
- Debut: January 5, 2004

Katsuhiko Nakajima (中嶋 勝彦, Nakajima Katsuhiko; born March 11, 1988) is a Japanese professional wrestler. He currently works as a freelancer, predominantly for Gleat and Pro Wrestling Zero1. He is best known for his time in All Japan Pro Wrestling (AJPW), Pro Wrestling Noah and Dragon Gate.

Known as the "Mad Wolf" (マッド・ウルフ, Maddo Urufu) and the "Dark Assassin" (闇の暗殺者, Yaminoansatsusha)" (among other nicknames), he is best known for his time in Pro Wrestling Noah. He started his career in Riki Choshu's Fighting World of Japan Pro Wrestling (WJ) promotion before heading to Kensuke Sasaki's Kensuke Office/Diamond Ring dojo and promotion. In AJPW, he is a former World Junior Heavyweight Champion. An accomplished karateka, his style is based upon strong, fast kicks and strikes; his style has been dubbed by Nakajima as "Toukon Style" (闘魂 STYLE, Tōkon sutairu), which was later changed to "XX Style" following a copyright dispute with IGF.

Nakajima made his professional debut aged 15 in a mixed martial arts contest, and immediately made a name for himself in puroresu, earning the nickname "Supernova" and facing Hall of Famers, such as Kenta Kobashi, Satoru Sayama, Jushin Thunder Liger, and Tatsumi Fujinami. He has competed in several notable Japanese promotions, including New Japan Pro-Wrestling (NJPW), Inoki Genome Federation, Pro Wrestling Zero1, Michinoku Pro, Dragon Gate, and Pro Wrestling Noah.

He set several age records throughout the first few years into his professional wrestling career, including being the youngest wrestler to compete in AJPW's Champion Carnival tournament, as well as the youngest to hold the World Junior Heavyweight Championship. He won the Tokyo Sports "Rookie of the Year" award in 2004 and the "Fighting Spirit" award in 2005. Having worked for Noah for most of his career, both as a representative of Diamond Ring and as a freelancer, he officially signed with the promotion in December 2015. He is a two-time GHC Heavyweight Champion, three-time GHC Junior Heavyweight Champion and a six-time GHC Tag Team Champion. He left Pro Wrestling Noah in 2023 and returned to working as a freelancer for AJPW, where he won the Triple Crown Heavyweight Championship before leaving that promotion in 2024, and for Gleat, where he became a one-time and longest-reigning Lidet UWF World Champion and a one-time G-Rex Champion.

== Professional wrestling career ==
=== Early career (2002–2004) ===
An accomplished karateka, Nakajima was hired by Riki Choshu's World Japan promotion in December 2002 at the age of 14. He debuted for World Japan (WJ) in September 2003, facing American fighter Jason Leigh in an MMA fight, winning via knockout in one minute and thirty-five seconds. His true professional wrestling debut came on the main event of World Japan's "Resolution" card on January 5, 2004, losing via submission to Tomohiro Ishii.

Nakajima continued to wrestle for WJ for a short time, including a match against the original Tiger Mask, Satoru Sayama, before signing with Kensuke Office in April 2004.

=== Kensuke Office / Diamond Ring (2004–2015) ===
Nakajima signed with Kensuke Office (later known as Diamond Ring) in April 2004. He continued to compete for Kensuke Office while also wrestling for other promotions in Japan. On February 11, 2006, at a Kensuke Office show celebrating Kensuke Sasaki's 20th career anniversary, Nakajima teamed with Genichiro Tenryu against Kenta Kobashi and Sasaki, losing after a Sasaki lariat.

Nakajima returned from injury on February 11, 2008, at Kensuke Office's first anniversary show, defeating fellow Kensuke Sasaki protégé Ryuji Yamaguchi. He followed this with victories over Kento Miyahara and Takashi Okita at the Kensuke Office exercise hall.

On February 11, 2014, Nakajima defeated his mentor Kensuke Sasaki in the main event of a show celebrating his tenth anniversary in professional wrestling. The match became Sasaki's retirement match. On July 31, 2015, Nakajima left Diamond Ring.

=== New Japan Pro-Wrestling (2004–2005, 2016) ===
Nakajima made his debut with New Japan Pro-Wrestling (NJPW), facing legendary junior heavyweight Jushin Thunder Liger in the Tokyo Dome on May 3, 2004. He continued to wrestle for NJPW extensively throughout 2004, competing in Block B of the Best of the Super Juniors tournament, finishing with two points by defeating Curry Man. He also reached the finals of the Young Lion Toukon tournament, losing to Ryusuke Taguchi.His appearances in NJPW became more sporadic in 2005, with his final match taking place on April 24, 2005, when he lost to six-time IWGP Heavyweight Champion Tatsumi Fujinami.

From July 22 to August 13, 2016, Nakajima took part in NJPW's 2016 G1 Climax, where he finished tied third in his block with a record of five wins and four losses, failing to advance to the finals.

=== All Japan Pro Wrestling (2004–2008) ===
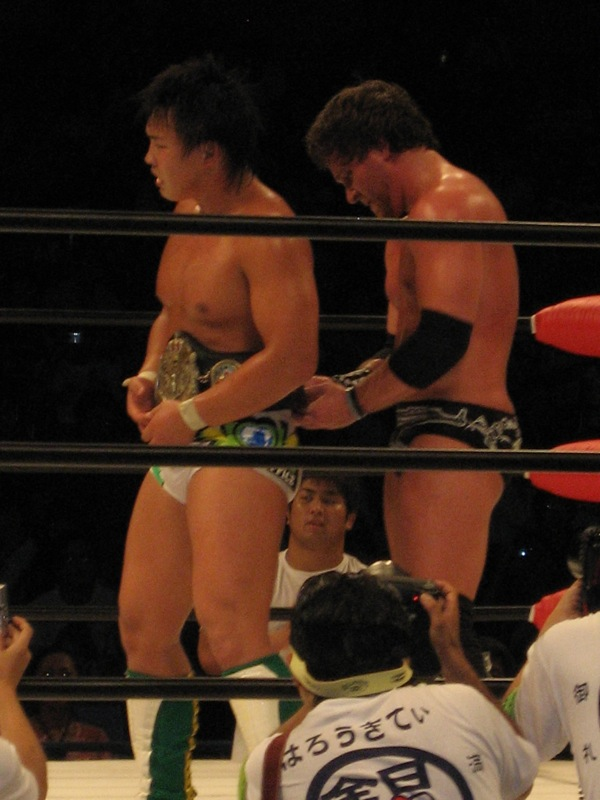
Nakajima (left) and Chris Sabin (right) after Nakajima had defeated Sabin to retain the World Junior Heavyweight Championship.

Nakajima made his debut with All Japan Pro Wrestling (AJPW) on May 4, 2004, successfully teaming with Toshiaki Kawada in a six-man tag team match. On June 12, 2004, he and Kensuke Sasaki unsuccessfully challenged Masanobu Fuchi and Genichiro Tenryu for the All Asia Tag Team Championship.

In June 2005, Nakajima teamed with Tomoaki Honma in a tournament to decide the vacant All Asia Tag Team Championship, reaching the finals before losing to Shuji Kondo and "brother" Yasshi. On July 26, 2005, Nakajima and Sasaki defeated Kondo and Yasshi to win the titles, giving Nakajima his first championship. They defended the titles through 2005 against teams including Arashi and Ryuji Hijikata and Buchanan and D'Lo Brown.

In 2006, Nakajima competed in the Champion Carnival and became the youngest wrestler to participate in the tournament. He also won his block in the 2006 AJPW Junior League, before losing in the final to Kaz Hayashi.

On February 17, 2007, Nakajima defeated Shuji Kondo to win the World Junior Heavyweight Championship, becoming the youngest junior heavyweight champion in history. He successfully defended the title against "brother" Yasshi and Ryuji Hijikata. In August 2007, he defeated Chris Sabin to retain the championship.

In March 2008, Nakajima and Ryuji Hijikata won the AJPW Junior Tag League, defeating Kaz Hayashi and El Samurai in the final. His final AJPW match for the time being took place on June 29, 2008, when he teamed with Kaz Hayashi to defeat Ryuji Hijikata and T28.

=== Dragon Gate (2004) ===
Nakajima made his debut in Dragon Gate on September 17, 2004, at the promotion's pay-per-view Gate of Sanctuary, losing to Masaaki Mochizuki.

=== Osaka Pro Wrestling (2004–2005) ===
In October 2004, Nakajima entered the Osaka Pro Wrestling Tenno-zan single-elimination tournament, losing to eventual winner Big Boss MA-G-MA in the first round. On May 7, 2005, he participated in the 2005 Differ Cup, teaming with Osaka Pro's Takehiro Murahama; the two lost in the first round.

=== Pro Wrestling Zero1-Max (2005–2006) ===
Nakajima made his debut for Pro Wrestling Zero1-Max on July 9, 2005, winning a six-man junior tag team match. He went on to defeat Osamu Namiguchi on August 31 for his first singles title, the WWA World Junior Light Heavyweight Championship, though whether this can be considered part of the title's official lineage is disputed. He held the title until June 24, 2006, losing it to Tatsuhito Takaiwa. This was his final appearance with the promotion.

=== Pro Wrestling Noah (2005–2006) ===
Nakajima made his debut in Pro Wrestling Noah on July 18, 2005, wrestling in a six-man tag team match in the Tokyo Dome. He later teamed with Kensuke Sasaki against Kenta Kobashi and Go Shiozaki on November 5, 2005.

=== Japanese independent circuit (2006) ===
On April 19, 2006, Nakajima entered Big Mouth Loud, losing to company ace Katsuyori Shibata. In May 2006, Nakajima and Kensuke Sasaki competed in Big Japan Pro Wrestling, defeating Daisuke Sekimoto and DDT Pro-Wrestling's Daichi Kakimoto in a tag team match. On November 14, 2006, Nakajima wrestled in the main event of the debut show of the Global Professional Wrestling Alliance, teaming with Noah's Go Shiozaki and El Dorado's Takuya Sugawara to defeat Zero1-Max's Ryouji Sai, Dramatic Dream Team's Harashima, and Kaientai Dojo's Kazma.

=== Return to Pro Wrestling Noah (2008–2023) ===
==== Championship reigns (2008–2018) ====
Nakajima began wrestling consistently with Noah starting July 2, 2008, after Kensuke Office announced that it would support Noah instead of All Japan for the foreseeable future. He competed in Noah's NTV Cup junior heavyweight tag team league with Kota Ibushi, finishing fifth with eight points.

On February 11, 2009, Nakajima won the GHC Junior Heavyweight Championship from Kenta, but lost the championship back to him on March 1. On September 23, 2011, Nakajima defeated Kotaro Suzuki to win the GHC Junior Heavyweight Championship for the second time. He was forced to vacate the title nine days later after undergoing surgery for acute appendicitis. He returned on November 27 and defeated Ricky Marvin to regain the championship. On May 9, 2012, Nakajima lost the title to Yoshinobu Kanemaru.

In 2013, Nakajima and Kensuke Sasaki reached the Global Tag League final, losing to Kenta and Yoshihiro Takayama. He later joined Naomichi Marufuji's Brave faction. On February 11, 2014, Nakajima defeated Kensuke Sasaki in Sasaki's retirement match.

On December 24, 2015, Noah held a press conference announcing that Nakajima would be ending his days as a freelancer and officially joining the promotion on January 1, 2016. On February 24, 2016, Nakajima picked up the biggest win of his career by defeating Minoru Suzuki in the main event of Noah's show in Korakuen Hall. As a result, Nakajima was granted a shot at the GHC Heavyweight Championship, but was defeated by Takashi Sugiura on March 19.

On October 23, 2016, Nakajima defeated Takashi Sugiura to win the GHC Heavyweight Championship for the first time. Nakajima made his first title defense in a match against the 2016 Global League winner, Minoru Suzuki, at One Night Cruise in Korakuen on December 2. Nakajima's second title defense was on December 24 as a part the Winter Navigation tour where he defended his title against his ally and occasional tag team partner, Masa Kitamiya. Following the match, Sugiura challenged Nakajima to a rematch for the title. This rematch would take place on January 7, 2017, which was the first show of Noah's first tour of 2017 "The First Navigation." Nakajima ultimately defeated Sugiura thus marking his third title defense. Nakajima defeated Go Shiozaki at "Great Voyage in Yokohama" on March 12, 2017, marking his fourth title defense. On June 4, 2017, at "Navigation with Breeze", Nakajima made his fifth title defense against Muhammad Yone. He followed it up with his sixth successful defense against Atsushi Kotoge on June 25, 2017. On July 20, he defeated Brian Cage to make his seventh successful defense. On August 26, Nakajima lost the title to Eddie Edwards in his eighth defense. On March 11, 2018, Nakajima and Kitamiya defeated 50 Funky Powers (Muhammad Yone and Quiet Storm) to win the GHC Tag Team Championship for the first time together, thus marking Nakajima's first reign with the title. However on April 29, they lost the titles to Go Shiozaki and Kaito Kiyomiya in their first defense. After the match, Nakajima and Kitamiya attacked Shiozaki and Kiyomiya, with Nakajima showing a new, more sadistic personality in the following months. They regained the titles one month later only to again lose them in their first defense on July 28 to Naomichi Marufuji and Akitoshi Saito. After Kitamiya unsuccessfully challenged Takashi Sugiura for the GHC Heavyweight Championship, he was challenged to a title match by the champion, which he accepted. Nakajima would also unsuccessfully challenge Sugiura for the title on October 4. Nakajima participated on the 2018 Global League, winning 4 matches and losing 2, failing to advance to the finals. However, after Naomichi Marufuji suffered an injury on his shoulder, a three way match to determine the new finalist between Kenoh, Kohei Sato and Katsuhiko Nakajima happened on November 25, which Nakajima won. On the finals, Nakajima would lose to Kaito Kiyomiya. Naomichi Marufuji and Akitoshi Saito vacated the GHC Tag Team Championship on November 28, a tournament to decide the new champions happened on December 7.

==== Axiz (2018–2020) ====
Nakajima teamed with Go Shiozaki, and together they would defeat Cody Hall and Maybach Taniguchi at the first round, and Kenoh and Masa Kitamiya at the finals. They would lose the titles 9 days later to Maybach Taniguchi and a debuting Yuji Hino. They got their rematch on January 6, but failed again. However, after Muhammed Yone and Quiet Storm defeated Taniguchi and Hino, Nakajima and Shiozaki challenged the new champions. This led to a match on February 24, which Nakajima and Shiozaki won. Backstage, Nakajima said that his Tag Team with Go Shiozaki has a name, and it is Axiz. Axiz made their first successful defense on March 10, against the team of Eddie Edwards and Masa Kitamiya. From April 7 until April 30, Axiz took part in the 2019 Global Tag League, finishing the tournament with a record of five wins, one loss, and one draw, advancing to the finals of the tournament. On May 4, Axiz was defeated in the finals by Sugiura-gun (Takashi Sugiura and Kazma Sakamoto). On June 13, Axiz lost the GHC Tag Team Championship to Sugiura-gun, before defeating them in rematch on June 27 to win the GHC Tag Team Championship for the record-breaking third time. Afterwards, Axiz were challenged by Kaito Kiyomiya and Shuhei Taniguchi to match for their titles. Nakajima accepted Kiyomiya and Taniguchi's challenge for their titles on the condition that Kiyomiya would defend the GHC Heavyweight Championship against him. On July 21, Axiz defeated Kiyomiya and Taniguchi to make their first successful of the GHC Tag Team Championship. Six days later, Nakajima unsuccessfully challenged Kaito Kiyomiya for the GHC Heavyweight Championship.

On January 5, 2020, at January New Sunrise and Reboot Koruaken Hall Show, Axiz lost the GHC Tag Team Championship to Masaaki Mochizuki and Naomichi Marufuji. Afterwards, Axiz began focusing on their singles careers, after Nakajima defeated Daiki Inaba to win the Wrestle-1 Championship on January 12 as part of a working relationship between Noah and Wrestle-1. Nakajima lost the title to Kaz Hayashi on March 15. The following month, Axiz took part in the 2020 Global Tag League, making to their second consecutive Global Tag League final by winning their block in the 2020 tournament with a record of two wins and one loss. On April 18, they were defeated in the finals of the tournament by Sugiura-gun International (Hijo de Dr. Wagner Jr. and Rene Dupree). On May 9, Nakajima defeated Takashi Sugiura to win the GHC National Championship, meaning that Axiz held both Noah's singles championships. On August 4, on the first night of Departure, Nakajima lost the GHC National Championship to Kenoh.

==== Kongo (2020–2023) ====
On August 20, Axiz faced Sugiura-gun (Kazushi Sakuraba and Takashi Sugiura) in a losing effort for the vacant GHC Tag Team Championship. Afterwards, Nakajima turned on Shiozaki in order to join Kongo, effectively disbanding Axiz. From September 18 and October 11, Nakajima took part in the 2020 N-1 Victory, finishing the tournament with a record of four wins, and one loss to advance to the finals of the tournament. On October 11, Nakajima defeated Kaito Kiyomiya in the finals to win the 2020 N-1 Victory. This led on November 23 at Noah The Chronicle Vol. 4, Nakajima unsuccessfully challenging Go Shiozaki for the GHC Heavyweight Championship. Following Kongo's feud with Sugiura-gun, on January 31, Nakajima and Masa Kitamiya faced Sugiura-gun members Takashi Sugiura and Kendo Kashin in a winning effort. After the match, Nakajima and Kitamiya challenged Sugiura and his partner Kazushi Sakuraba to a title match for the GHC Tag Team Championship. Afterwards, in a post-match interview, Nakajima confirmed the reunion of The Aggression. On March 7, 2021, at Great Voyage in Yokohama, Nakajima and Kitamiya defeated Sugiura-gun's Kazushi Sakuraba and Takashi Sugiura to win the GHC Tag Team Championship for the third time. On May 31, following a GHC Tag Team Championship title defense, Kitamiya turned on Nakajima, leaving Kongo due to his hatred towards Nakajima, effectively ending their partnership. This led to Noah announcing a steel cage lucha de apuestas, hair vs. hair match on June 26. At the event Cage War, Nakajima was forced to shave his hair after being defeated by his former partner Kitamiya and would instruct his Kongo stablemate Kenoh to fully shave his head. Despite their breakup, Nakajima and Kitamiya were recognized as GHC Tag Team Champions, until on June 30, Nakajima and Kitamiya decided to face each other for the vacant titles, with Nakajima teaming with Soya and Kitamiya with Kaito Kiyomiya. On July 22, Nakajima and Soya were defeated by Kitamiya and Kaito Kiyomiya for the vacant GHC Tag Team Championship.

In September, Nakajima took part in the 2021 N-1 Victory, winning his block with a record of two wins and one loss, advancing to the semifinals of the tournament. On October 3, Nakajima defeated Masakatsu Funaki and then fellow Kongo stablemate Kenoh, in the semifinals and finals, respectively, to win the N-1 Victory for the second year, earning a shot at the GHC Heavyweight Championship. On October 10, Nakajima defeated Naomichi Marufuji to win the GHC Heavyweight Championship for the second time. On November 13, Nakajima was challenged by stablemate Kenoh to a double title-match for the GHC Heavyweight and GHC National Championships on November 28 at Noah The Best. At the event, Nakajima faced Kenoh in a 60-minute time limit draw to retain the GHC Heavyweight Championship and unsuccessfully challenging Kenoh for the GHC National Championship. Afterwards, Go Shiozaki made his return from injury challenging his former Axiz teammate Katsuhiko Nakajima to a title match for the GHC Heavyweight Championship on January 1, at Noah The New Year. On December 27, following a victory in a ten-man tag team match, where Nakajima pinned Shiozaki, he stated that if lost to him at Noah The New Year, Shiozaki should never repeat his catchphrase "I am Noah" again. At a press conference the following day, Shiozaki agreed to Nakajima's condition of never using his catchphrase "I am Noah" again, on the condition that if he won, Nakajima would be forced to reunite Axiz with him. At the event, Nakajima successfully defended the GHC Heavyweight Championship against Shiozaki, forcing him to abandon his "I am Noah" catchphrase. On January 16, Nakajima made his fourth successful title defense against Masa Kitamiya. On February 23, Nakajima lost the GHC Heavyweight Championship to Kazuyuki Fujita in his fifth title defense.

On June 12, 2022, at CyberFight Festival 2022, Nakajima teamed with Atsushi Kotoge and Yoshiki Inamura, facing off against Burning (Jun Akiyama and Tetsuya Endo) and Kazusada Higuchi in a six-man tag team match, where in the match, Nakajima delivered a slap to Endo that knocked Endo out, causing the match to be called off.

On April 16, 2023, at Green Journey in Sendai, he failed to capture the GHC Heavyweight Championship from Jake Lee. He competed in the 2023 N-1 Victory in the B Block, ending the tournament with 8 points and thus failing to advance to the finals. He departed Pro Wrestling Noah in October 2023 after a 15-year tenure with the promotion, citing that he "wanted to challenge himself", as well as believing that 35 is a major crossroads in many peoples' lives. In his final match, he and Go Shiozaki were defeated by Naomichi Marufuji and Takashi Sugiura.

=== Ring of Honor (2008–2009) ===
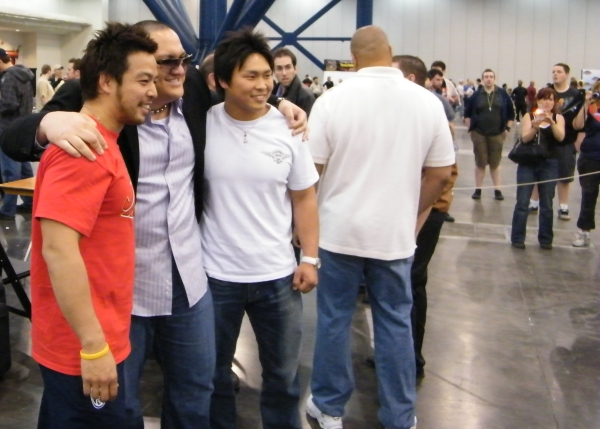
Nakajima (right) during his United States excursion with Kenta (far left) and Samoa Joe in 2009

On September 14, 2008, Nakajima participated in Ring of Honor's second tour of Japan, teaming with Naomichi Marufuji against Kenta and Kota Ibushi. The following week on September 20, Nakajima wrestled his first match in the United States, challenging GHC Junior Heavyweight Champion Bryan Danielson at ROH's Glory by Honor VII. On November 13, 2009. Nakajima returned to ROH in Novi, Michigan, losing to Kenny Omega. The following night in Mississauga, Ontario, he defeated El Generico.

=== Return to Pro Wrestling Zero1 (2012–2014) ===
Nakajima returned to Pro Wrestling Zero1 (formerly Pro Wrestling Zero1-Max) after six years on March 2, 2012, where he teamed with Kensuke Sasaki against at Daichi Hashimoto and Shinjiro Otani. Nakajima would make two more appearances for Zero1 in 2013 and 2014.

=== Return to AJPW (2023–2024) ===
On November 5, 2023, in his first AJPW match since 2012, Nakajima defeated Yuma Aoyagi to win the Triple Crown Heavyweight Championship for the first time. Then, he entered the Real World Tag League alongside Hokuto Omori, winning the tournament at the #1 spot with 12 points. The duo failed in their subsequent title shot, losing to the Saito Brothers on January 14, 2024. On March 30, 2024, he lost the Triple Crown Heavyweight Championship to Yuma Anzai after 146 days. He departed AJPW shortly after.

=== Gleat (2024–present) ===
On July 1, 2024, he debuted for Gleat, defeating Takanori Ito in 11 minutes to win the Lidet UWF World Championship. On July 1, 2025, Nakajima defeated Kaito Ishida for the G-Rex Championship. He lost the G-Rex Championship to El Lindaman on October 9, ending his reign at 100 days and one successful defense. On March 8, 2026, Nakajima lost the Lidet UWF World Championship to Soma Watanabe, ending his record-long reign at 615 days and seven successful defenses.

=== Second return to Zero1 (2026–present) ===
Nakajima returned to Zero1 after twelve years on February 28, 2026, where he defeated Junya Matsunaga. From June to August, Nakajima competed and won the Fire Festival tournament as part of B-Block, defeating Masato Tanaka in the grand final.

=== European independent circuit (2026–present) ===
In September 2026, Nakajima competed in the German promotion Westside Xtreme Wrestling (wXw) as part of the König Der Catcher tournament in A-Block. Nakajima finished the tournament with 3 points, failing to advance to the finals. On October 3, 2026, Nakajima made his debut for Italian promotion Squash a Jobber Wrestling (SAJ), defeating Luke Jacobs. The following day, Nakajima made his debut for the British promotion Revolution Pro Wrestling (RevPro) at RevPro Live in London 112, where he unsuccessfully challenged Connor Mills for the Undisputed British Heavyweight Championship.

== Championships and accomplishments ==
- All Japan Pro Wrestling
  - Triple Crown Heavyweight Championship (1 time)
  - All Asia Tag Team Championship (1 time) – with Kensuke Sasaki
  - World Junior Heavyweight Championship (1 time)
  - Junior Tag League (2008) – with Ryuji Hijikata
  - World's Strongest Tag Determination League (2023) – with Hokuto Omori
  - January 3 Korakuen Hall Junior Heavyweight Battle Royal (2005)
  - Samurai! TV Cup Triple Arrow Tournament (2007) – with Kensuke Sasaki and Seiya Sanada
- Gleat
  - Lidet UWF World Championship (1 time)
  - G-Rex Championship (1 time)
  - G-Class Tournament (2025)
- Michinoku Pro Wrestling
  - Tohoku Tag Team Championship (1 time) – with Kensuke Sasaki
- New Japan Pro-Wrestling
  - Yuko Six Man Tag Team Tournament (2004) – with Blue Wolf and Shinsuke Nakamura
  - New Wave Award (2004)
- Pro Wrestling Illustrated
  - Ranked No. 32 of the 500 best singles wrestlers in the PWI 500 in 2022 and 2024
- Pro Wrestling Noah
  - GHC Heavyweight Championship (2 time)
  - GHC National Championship (1 time)
  - GHC Junior Heavyweight Championship (3 times)
  - GHC Tag Team Championship (6 times) – with Masa Kitamiya (3) and Go Shiozaki (3)
  - Leave Cup Scramble Battle Royal (2013)
  - N-1 Victory (2020, 2021)
  - Global League Outstanding Performance Award (2014)
  - Global Tag League Outstanding Performance Award (2013) – with Kensuke Sasaki
  - Global Tag League Outstanding Performance Award (2014) – with Naomichi Marufuji
- Pro Wrestling Zero1
  - Fire Festival (2026)
  - Tag Strongest Tournament (2026) with Yuki Toki
  - WWA World Junior Light Heavyweight Championship (1 time)
- Tenryu Project
  - Tenryu Project International Junior Heavyweight Tag Team Championship (1 time) – with Satoshi Kajiwara
- Tokyo Sports
  - Fighting Spirit Award (2005, 2016)
  - Rookie of the Year (2004)
- Wrestle-1
  - Wrestle-1 Championship (1 time)
