= Takashi Sugiura =

Japanese wrestler (born 1970)

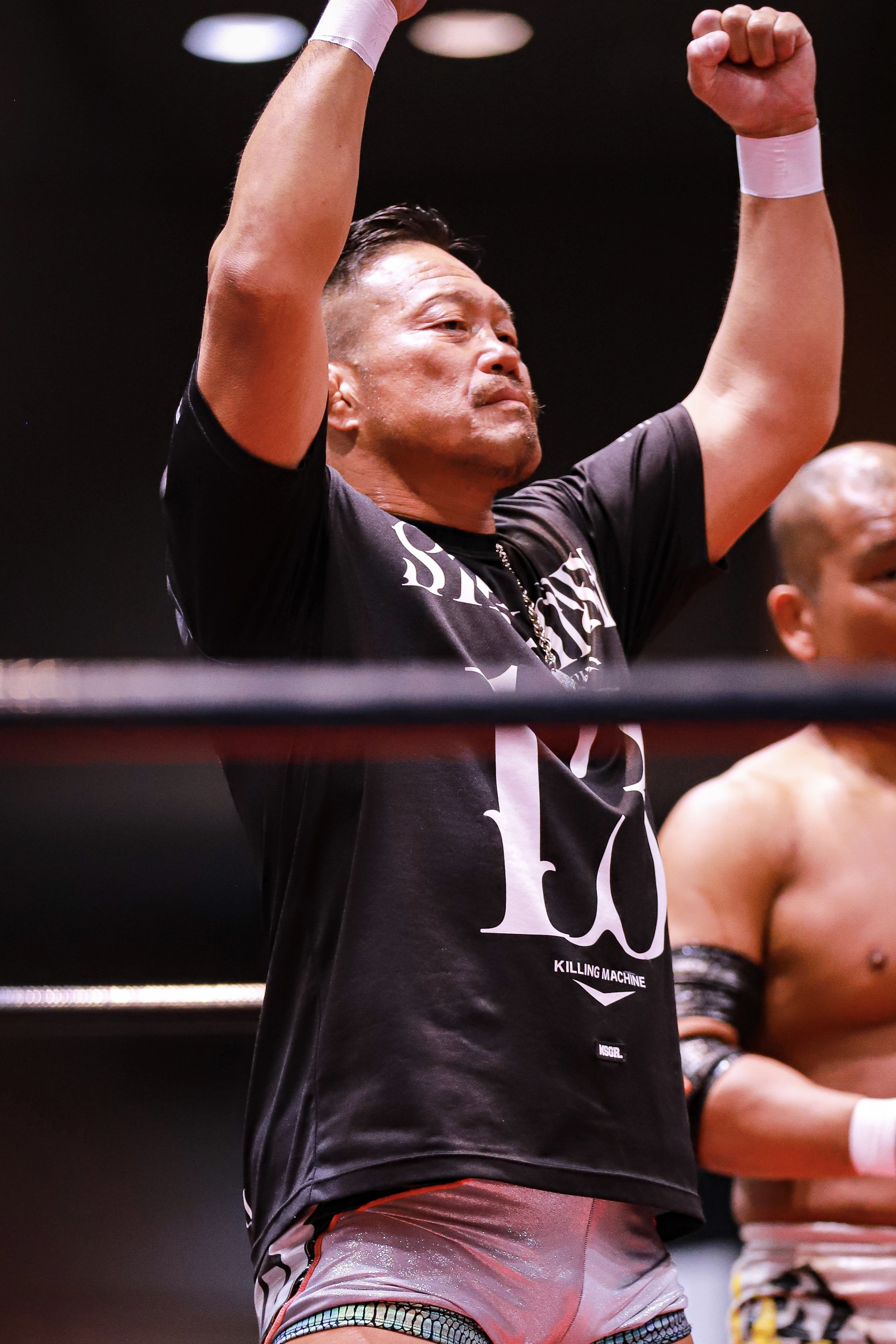
- Sugiura in 2023

Personal information
- Born: May 31, 1970 (age 56) Nagoya, Aichi, Japan
- Spouse: ? (m. 1997)
- Children: 2 (including Kaho)

Professional wrestling career
- Ring name(s): Santa Claus; Takashi Sugiura
- Billed height: 1.78 m (5 ft 10 in)
- Billed weight: 89 kg (196 lb)
- Billed from: Nagoya, Japan
- Trained by: All Japan Pro Wrestling Dojo; Yoshihiro Takayama; Tamon Honda; Akira Taue
- Debut: December 23, 2000

Takashi Sugiura (杉浦 貴, Sugiura Takashi; born May 31, 1970) is a Japanese professional wrestler and former freestyle wrestler. As of 2000, he is signed to Pro Wrestling Noah (Noah). Known mostly as the "Killing Machine", he is a four-time, longest reigning and most successfully-defensive GHC Heavyweight Champion. He is currently a member of Team 2000X.

Sugiura, an accomplished amateur wrestler, joined the AJPW dojo in 1999, and later the Noah dojo after the exodus, making his professional debut on December 23, 2000, and thus becoming the first wrestler to make their debut in Noah. He has also competed in mixed martial arts with a notable victory over Giant Silva. Sugiura wrestled as a junior heavyweight in his earlier pro career and is a former GHC Junior Heavyweight Champion. Sugiura moved up to heavyweight and became the second longest reigning GHC Heavyweight Champion in his first reign, having held the title for 581 days between December 2009 and July 2011.

== Early life ==
Sugiura was born on May 31, 1970. In the fifth grade, he became a fan of pro wrestling after seeing the first Tiger Mask on the local pro wrestling station that would broadcast matches from New Japan Pro-Wrestling (NJPW) and its affiliated promotions (such as the WWF). As his dream was to become a professional wrestler at the time, he tried to take up martial arts classes in middle school as a preliminary; their school did not have any classes for such, and was forced to take soccer lessons. Sugiura became an accomplished judoka at Chukyo High School near Chukyo University in Aichi. He used his judo training to become an amateur wrestler, after being inspired to by gold medal Olympic wrestler Atsuji Miyahara.

After graduating high school, he became an enlisted member of the Jieitai's Rikujō Jieitai, or Ground Self-Defense Force unit. During his time as a member of the unit, he tried out to represent Japan at the 1996 Summer Olympics in Atlanta. He was discharged from the Jieitai in 1999, and passed the entrance exam to the All Japan Pro Wrestling (AJPW) dojo right before the Noah exodus. Before he left with the rest of the staff and talent to join Noah, he had his training overseen by Tamon Honda and Yoshihiro Takayama. He became an errand boy for senior wrestler and former Triple Crown champion Akira Taue, who later also assisted in Sugiura's training.

== Professional wrestling career ==
Sugiura made his debut on December 23, 2000, competing in a tag team match alongside Masao Inoue and Takeshi Rikio against the trio Takeshi Morishima, Yoshinobu Kanemaru and Kentaro Shiga. While he began his career in the lower ranks, Sugiura’s distinct, American-influenced style quickly resonated with fans. This momentum led to the formation of "SugiKane," a formidable tag team with Yoshinobu Kanemaru. The duo made an immediate impact, defeating Naomichi Marufuji and Kenta to capture the GHC Junior Heavyweight Tag Team Championship effectively halting their historic title reign.

Sugiura owns the distinction of being the only wrestler in Pro Wrestling Noah to have been a double champion on two separate occasions. In recent years, he received a title shot in the heavyweight division against then GHC Heavyweight Champion Takeshi Morishima in match and winning the GHC Tag Team Championship along with Naomichi Marufuji from the bigger & stronger team of D'Lo Brown and Bull Buchanan.

At NJPW Wrestle Kingdom III he pushed New Japan Pro-Wrestling (NJPW) representative Shinsuke Nakamura to his limit in a cross promotional tag team match with Mitsuharu Misawa and Hirooki Goto as their respective partners, but came up short and tapped out to Nakamura's Cross Armbar finish. Nakamura then stated that there would be a singles match between them soon, as he felt he was embarrassed by a wrestler below his standards. The two met again later in the year in a cross-promotional match, this time Sugiura teamed with blue-chip prospect Go Shiozaki & Nakamura teamed with then-RISE stablemate Milano Collection AT, who was also returning from injury. Shiozaki/Sugiura picked up the win & Nakamura demanded a rematch against the duo with Hirooki Goto as his tag team partner. On July 20, he faced Hiroshi Tanahashi in the first ever NJPW vs. NOAH match for the IWGP Heavyweight Championship. After 24 minutes and two High Fly Flows, Tanahashi retained the Championship. Sugiura also participated in the 2009 G1 Climax. With his rival Nakamura in his block, a long anticipated singles match came to pass. Although he lost the match he still managed to finish second in his block & advanced to the semi-finals losing to the tournament eventual winner Togi Makabe.

On December 6, 2009, Sugiura pinned Go Shiozaki to win the GHC Heavyweight Championship. On January 4, 2010, at Wrestle Kingdom IV in Tokyo Dome Sugiura successfully defended the title against Hirooki Goto. On 28 February, he retained his title against Togi Makabe and then on 10 July against Yoshihiro Takayama. On October 1, 2010, Sugiura travelled to Tamaulipas, Mexico to defend the GHC Heavyweight Championship, defeating Chessman at Lucha Libre AAA World Wide (AAA) event Héroes Inmortales IV. Sugiura returned to New Japan on January 4, 2011, at Wrestle Kingdom V in Tokyo Dome, where he and Yoshihiro Takayama defeated Hirooki Goto and Kazuchika Okada in a tag team match. On May 15, 2011, Sugiura defeated Claudio Castagnoli in Oberhausen, Germany to make his fourteenth successful GHC Heavyweight Championship defense, breaking the record for most defenses, set by Kenta Kobashi. On July 10, Sugiura lost the GHC Heavyweight Championship to Go Shiozaki, ending his reign at 581 days. On January 4, 2012, Sugiura returned to New Japan at Wrestle Kingdom VI in Tokyo Dome, where he was defeated by Hirooki Goto.

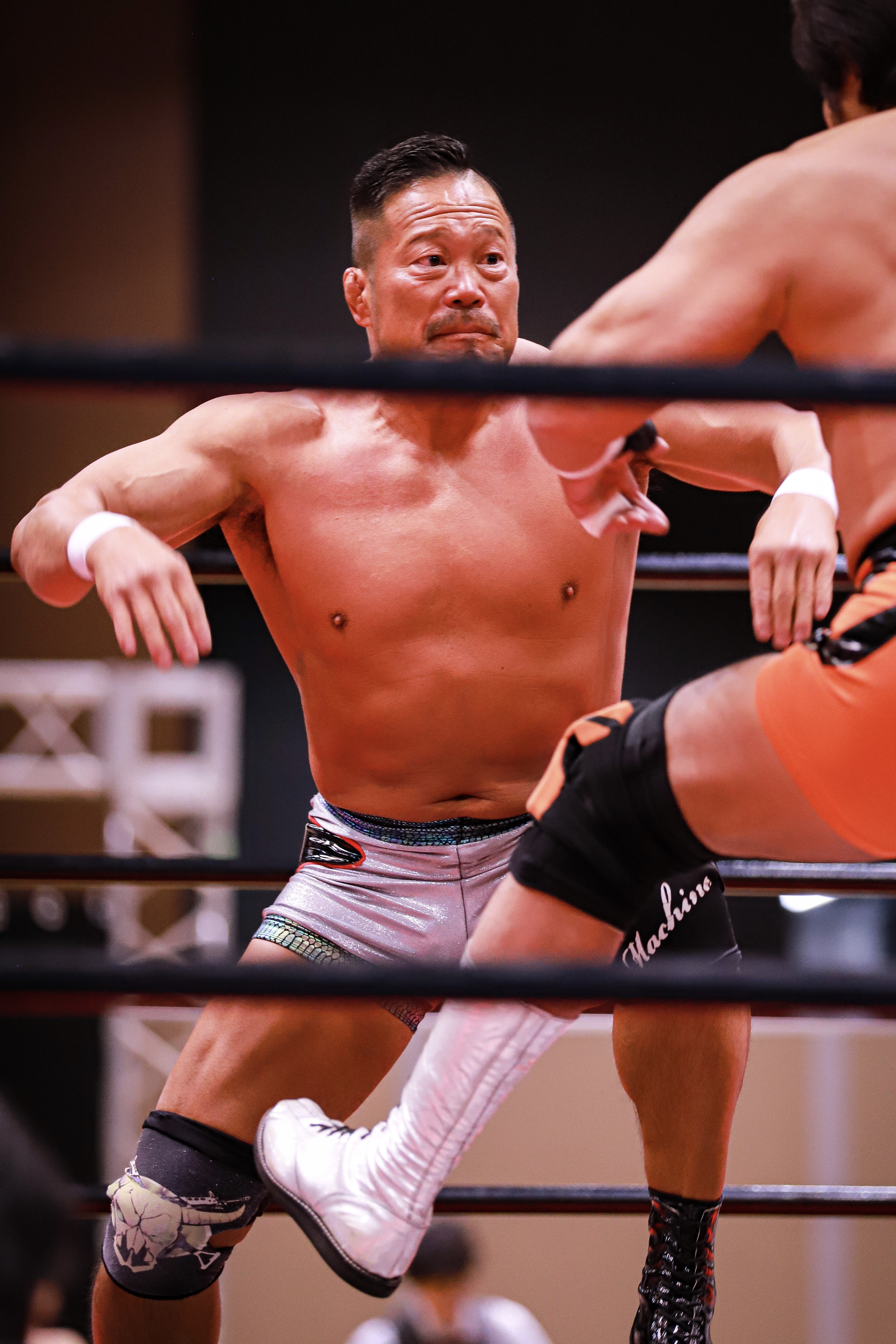
Sugiura at a Pro Wrestling Zero1 show in May 2023

In early 2014, Sugiura formed the Dangan Yankies tag team with Pro Wrestling Zero1 (Zero1)'s Masato Tanaka. The duo worked in both Noah and Zero1, winning the GHC Tag Team and NWA Intercontinental Tag Team Championships in May 2014, the Furinkazan tournament in December 2014, and the Global Tag League in both 2014 and 2015. In addition, Tokyo Sports named Dangan Yankies the 2014 tag team of the year. On December 23, 2015, Sugiura turned on Noah and joined the villainous Suzuki-gun stable. On January 31, 2016, Sugira defeated Naomichi Marufuji to win the GHC Heavyweight Championship for the second time. He lost the title to Go Shiozaki on May 28. Sugiura regained the title from Shiozaki on July 30. He lost the title to Katsuhiko Nakajima in his third defense on October 23. On December 2, Sugiura turned on Suzuki-gun, after Minoru Suzuki had unsuccessfully challenged Nakajima for the GHC Heavyweight Championship. In January 2017, Sugiura formed an alliance with Kaito Kiyomiya, almost serving as a mentor. The two began regularly teaming together, and were eventually joined by Kenoh, who turned on his tag team partner Masa Kitamiya during a match against Sugiura and Kiyomiya, aligning himself with Sugiura in the process.

On March 12, 2017, Sugiura and Kenoh defeated Muhammad Yone and Kitamiya to win the vacant GHC Tag Team Championship. They lost the titles to Naomichi Marufuji and Maybach Taniguchi on April 14. In June, he went on hiatus to undergo open-heart surgery for an irregular heartbeat he had dealt with for a long time; the surgery was successful. He returned on October 28, where he teamed with Kenoh to defeat Leona and Katsuhiko Nakajima.

On March 11, 2018, he defeated his tag team partne, Kenoh, to win the GHC Heavyweight Championship for the fourth time, making him the only man to have held the title four times. On April 29, he defeated Atsushi Kotoge for his first successful defense and afterwards offered Naomichi Marufuji the next shot at the title, which he accepted. This led to a match exactly one month later on May 29, where he defeated Marufuji for his second successful defense. On June 26, he defeated Kenoh in a rematch to make his third successful defense. After the match, he issued a challenge to Go Shiozaki, who had pinned him in a tag match two weeks earlier, which he accepted. They faced off on August 18 in Kawasaki, where Sugiura defeated Shiozaki to make his fourth successful defense. Afterward, he was challenged to a title match by Masa Kitamiya, whom he defeated on September 2 to make his fifth successful defense. On October 4, he defeated Kitamiya's tag team partner, Katsuhiko Nakajima to make his sixth successful title defense. Sugiura then participated in the 2018 Global League, where he finished with a record of four wins and three losses, including a loss to the eventual tournament winner, Kaito Kiyomiya. This led to a match on December 16, where Sugiura lost the title to Kiyomiya in his seventh defense.

Sugiura participated in the 2019 Global Tag League, teaming with Kazma Sakamoto where they went on to win the tournament. During the tournament, he formed a stable named "Sugiura-gun", with Nosawa Rongai, Hideki Suzuki, Sakamoto and Kinya Okada, while Sugiura was positioned as the leader of the stable. At the Mitsuharu Misawa Memorial Shows, Sugiura first challenged Kaito Kiyomiya for the GHC Heavyweight Championship on June 9, losing. Then, Sugiura challenged the team of Go Shiozaki and Katsuhiko Nakajima for the GHC Tag Team Championships on June 13, winning the titles for the fifth time with Kazma Sakamoto. Sugiura-gun disbanded amicably in 2023. Sugiura joined the heel unit Team 2000X in 2025, turning completely heel for the first time since his run in Suzuki-gun. He adopted the alias "The Godfather" as a result of his turn.

== Mixed martial arts career ==
Sugiura also dabbled in mixed martial arts, given his amateur background. His first fight was against the Brazilian rookie Daniel Gracie, which saw Takashi giving a strong impression. The Japanese wrestler dropped Gracie with a right punch at the first round, defended a back mount for a long time and blocked all of Daniel's submissions. He eventually tossed Gracie to the ground with an amateur throw and held top position over the Brazilian jiu-jitsu specialist. At the end, however, after Gracie dominated the final round from his guard, he was given the split decision over Sugiura.

Takashi's second fight was against another pro wrestler, Giant Silva, who had a 160lbs weight advantage over him. However, Sugiura dominated the bout, taking him down and throwing knee strikes until the referee brought the stoppage. The fight featured a controversial moment afterwards when Sugiura cut a promo which moved Silva to try to attack him with a wood club, having to be restrained by a team of officials. The brawl is cut from the DVD version distributed in United States, and is believed to be a professional wrestling angle or promotional stunt.

He also participated in the Pancrase Heavyweight Championship Tournament but was eliminated by Ryuta Noji. Sugiura's final match was against Alexandre Ribeiro in Sengoku, being finished by strikes and stomps at the third round.

== Mixed martial arts record ==
Professional record breakdown
4 matches	1 win	3 losses
By knockout	1	2
By decision	0	1

Res.	Record	Opponent	Method	Event	Date	Round	Time	Location	Notes
Loss	1–3	Alexandre Ribeiro	TKO (strikes)	World Victory Road Presents: Sengoku 5	September 28, 2008	3	4:18	Tokyo, Japan	
Loss	1–2	Ryuta Noji	KO (stomps)	Pancrase: Blow 3	April 9, 2006	1	3:25	Tokyo, Japan	
Win	1–1	Paulo Cesar Silva	TKO (punches)	PRIDE Bushido 4	July 19, 2004	1	2:35	Nagoya, Japan	
Loss	0–1	Daniel Gracie	Decision (split)	Pride 21	June 23, 2002	3	5:00	Saitama, Saitama, Japan	

== Personal life ==
Sugiura is a fond lover of dogs; his shiba-inu, Kenta, was the mascot of his unit Sugiura-gun. He has a wife and two children, an unnamed elder son and a younger daughter, Kaho. Kaho Sugiura currently plays for the Yamato Sylphid football club in the Japan Women's Football League, or Nadeshiko League. Whilst an active wrestler, he founded his own adult wrestling club, Gloria, which is located in Shibuya, Tokyo.

== Championships and accomplishments ==
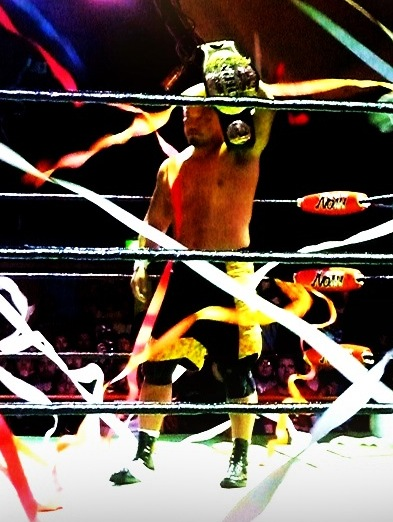
Sugiura is a four-time GHC Heavyweight Champion

- Nikkan Sports
  - Best Tag Team Award (2014) with Masato Tanaka
  - Fighting Spirit Award (2009, 2011)
  - MVP Award (2010)
- Pro Wrestling Illustrated
  - Ranked No. 5 of the top 500 singles wrestlers in the PWI 500 in 2011
- Pro Wrestling Noah
  - GHC Heavyweight Championship (4 times)
  - GHC National Championship (2 times)
  - GHC Junior Heavyweight Championship (2 times)
  - GHC Junior Heavyweight Tag Team Championship (2 times) – with Yoshinobu Kanemaru
  - GHC Tag Team Championship (12 times) – with Naomichi Marufuji (3), Masato Tanaka (1), Kenoh (1), Kazma Sakomoto (1), Kazushi Sakuraba (1), Hideki Suzuki (1), Satoshi Kojima (1), Shuhei Taniguchi (1) and Masa Kitamiya (2)
  - Global League (2014)
  - Global Tag League (2014, 2015, 2019) – with Masato Tanaka (2) and Kazma Sakomoto
  - One Night Junior Heavyweight Six Man Tag Team Tournament (2003) – with Yoshinobu Kanemaru and Makoto Hashi
  - Best Bout Award (2014) vs. Daisuke Sekimoto on November 8
  - Global League Outstanding Performance Award (2013)
  - Global Tag League Fighting Spirit Award (2010) – with Shuhei Taniguchi
  - Global Tag League Technique Award (2013) – with Atsushi Kotoge
- Pro Wrestling Zero1
  - World Heavyweight Championship (1 time)
  - NWA Intercontinental Tag Team Championship (1 time) – with Masato Tanaka
  - Furinkazan (2014) – with Masato Tanaka
- Tokyo Sports
  - Best Tag Team Award (2014) – with Masato Tanaka
  - Best Tag Team Award (2020) – with Kazushi Sakuraba
  - MVP Award (2010)
  - Outstanding Performance Award (2009)
- Westside Xtreme Wrestling
  - Trios Tournament (2006) – with Doug Williams and Yoshinobu Kanemaru
