= Kenoh =

Japanese professional wrestler (born 1985)

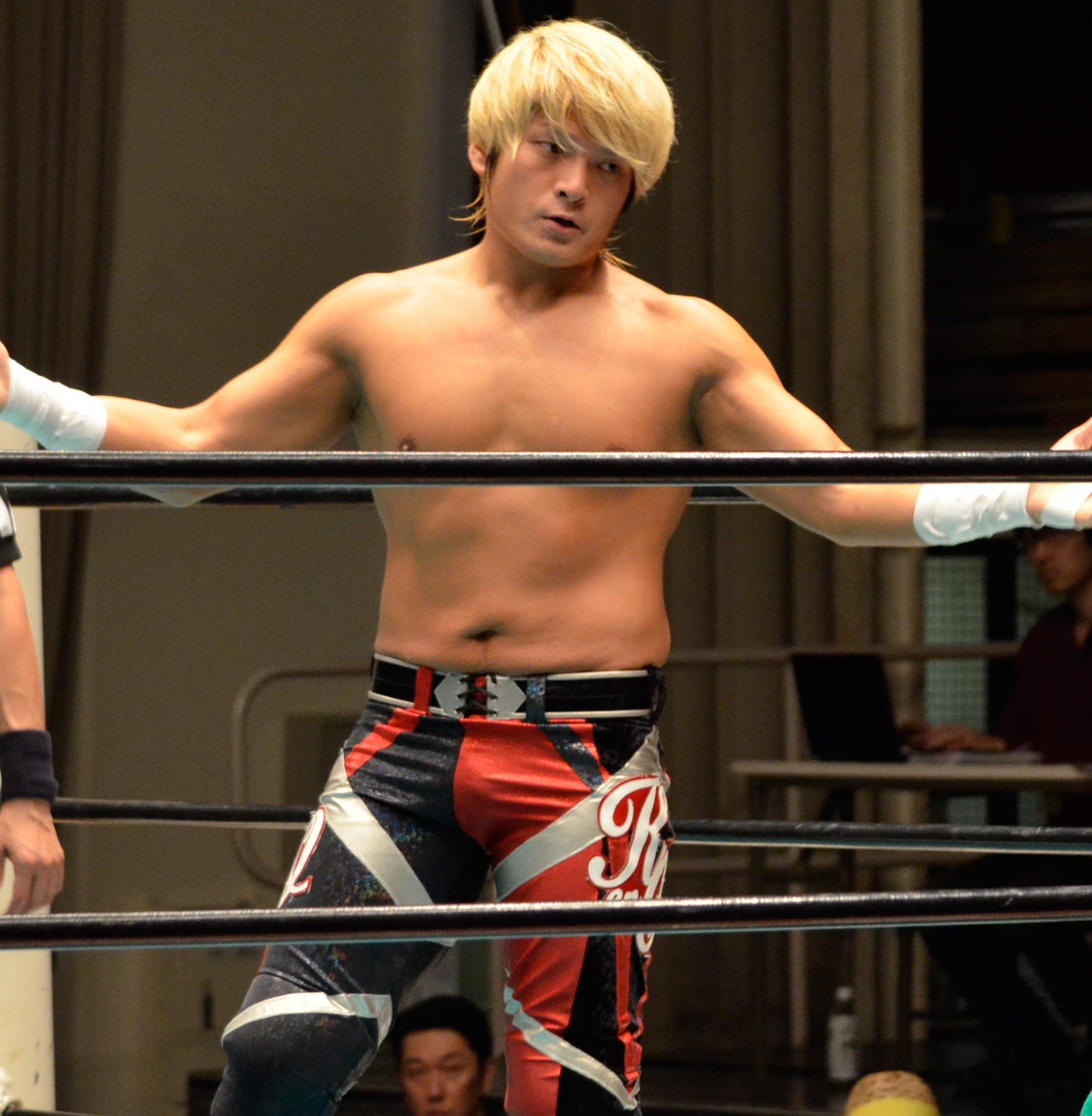
- Kenoh in 2015

Personal information
- Born: Daisuke Nakae; January 1, 1985 (age 41) Tokushima, Tokushima

Professional wrestling career
- Ring name(s): Budoka; Daisuke Nakae; Kanmuriwashi Yoko; Kenoh
- Billed height: 1.74 m (5 ft 9 in)
- Billed weight: 95 kg (209 lb)
- Trained by: Jinsei Shinzaki
- Debut: March 2, 2008

Daisuke Nakae (Japanese: 中栄 大輔, Hepburn: Nakae Daisuke) (born January 1, 1985) is a Japanese professional wrestler and martial artist, better known by the ring name Kenoh (拳王, Ken'ō). He currently wrestles in Pro Wrestling Noah, where he is a former 4-time GHC Heavyweight Champion. He is also a former 2-time GHC National Champion.

Kenoh began his career in Michinoku Pro Wrestling after being scouted by Jinsei Shinzaki. There, he would eventually go on to win the Tohoku Junior Heavyweight Championship three times, before leaving Michinoku Pro and signing with Pro Wrestling Noah in 2015. Initially competing as a junior heavyweight, he formed a popular tag team with Hajime Ohara, and the two went on to hold the GHC Junior Heavyweight Tag Team Championship two times. He graduated to the heavyweight division in 2017, and would go on to win the Global League and the GHC Heavyweight Championship in the same year.

== Early life ==
Nakae started training nippon kempo at the age of 3, and while in highschool won the championship of his category. Later, in 2003, he was crowned as the youngest All Japan kenpo champion ever, and went to win the contest again in 2006 and 2007.

== Professional wrestling career ==
=== Michinoku Pro Wrestling (2007–2013) ===
Nakae signed with Michinoku Pro Wrestling in 2007 after being scouted by Jinsei Shinzaki, wrestling several exhibition bouts before officially debuting against Alexander Otsuka. He went under the name of "Kenoh" (拳王, Ken'ō; Fist King), a reference to the character Raoh from popular manga and anime Fist of the North Star. He spent the year in low-profile matches against fellow trainees Rui Hiugaji and Takayuki Aizawa, and in late 2008 he was sent to hone his skills in Okinawa Pro Wrestling, where he adopted a parodic gimmick named "Kanmuriwashi Yoko" patterned after famous boxer Yoko "Kanmuriwashi" Gushiken. Under this character, Nakae sported an afro hairstyle similar to Gushiken's, although complete with a lucha libre mask and kickboxing attire.

In September 2009, Kenoh made his return to Michinoku Pro, being introduced by Jinsei Shinzaki as a special ally to counter fellow shoot-style wrestler Fujita "Jr." Hayato and his heel stable Kowloon. Kenoh declined an offer by Great Sasuke of having his redebut match against him and instead demanded a match against Hayato for the Tohoku Junior Heavyweight Champion, which the champion accepted. Shockingly, Kenoh won and captured the title, and went to enter in a heated feud with Fujita and his stablemates. He slowly became the next ace of the promotion, a place vacated after Yoshitsune's departure. The same year, Kenoh and Rui Hiugaji took part in the Michinoku Tag League, beating the teams of Munenori Sawa and Yuta Yoshikawa and Kowloon's Fujita Hayato and Rasse, but they were defeated at the finals by another Kowloon team, Takeshi Minamino and Maguro Ooma. On the individual field, Kenoh retained the Tohoku Junior Heavyweight title before Hayato, Minamino and Taro Nohashi, until he lost it to Great Sasuke.

In 2011, Kenoh and Kenbai were sent to compete in Pro Wrestling Noah's NTV G Cup Junior Heavyweight Tag League, where they got a big victory over heavy favourite team No Mercy (Kenta and Yoshinobu Kanemaru), with Kenoh personally pinning Kenta. They also challenged ANMU (Atsushi Aoki and Kotaro Suzuki) for the GHC Junior Heavyweight Tag Team Championship, but they were defeated.

Kenoh recaptured the Tohoku Junior Heavyweight Championship from Rui Hiugaji in September 2011. Started 2012, he claimed to have the goal to "change Michinoku Pro," which few understood, but it was all revealed when Taro Nohashi betrayed Fujita Hayato and expelled him from Kowloon, instead bringing Kenoh as the new leader. This made Kenoh turn heel, adopting a more arrogant persona for himself, and they renamed the stable as Asura, replacing with Hiugaji the members that had followed Hayato. They feuded with Hayato and his remnant group, called Bad Boy. Kenoh and Fujita clashed again, and this time Kenoh lost the match and the title, but he retaliated eliminating Bad Boy from the Michinoku Tag League 2012 to win it with stablemate Hiugaji.

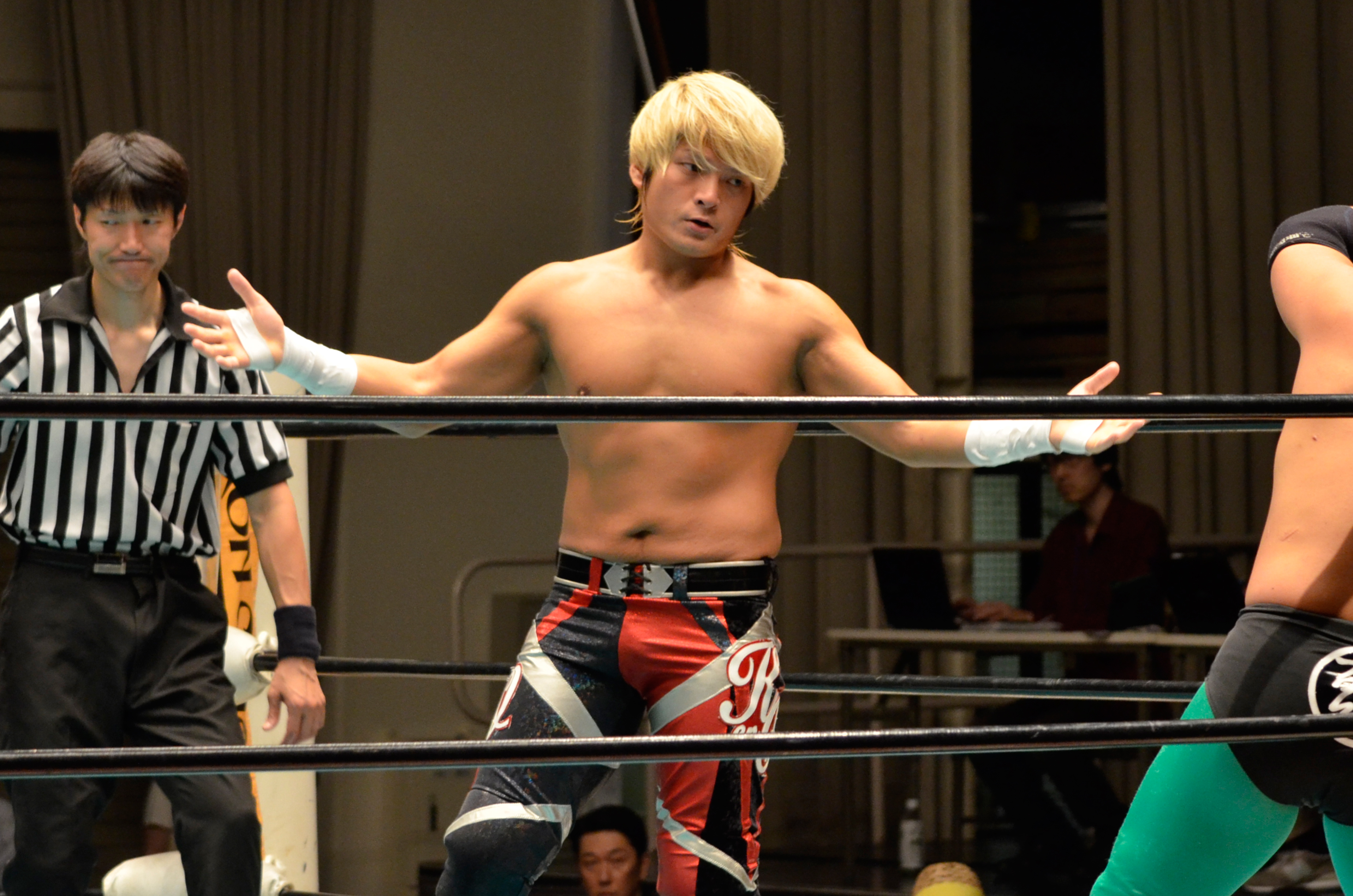
Kenoh in 2015

In 2013, Kenoh pinned Hayato to gain the Tohoku Junior Heavyweight Championship back, but on December 13, he vacated it, announcing his intention of joining Pro Wrestling Noah.

=== Pro Wrestling Noah (2014–present) ===
==== Teaming with Hajime Ohara (2014-2016) ====
Kenoh returned to Noah as a freelancer, joining the new Choukibou-gun stable in 2014 and forming a tag team with stablemate Hajime Ohara. On August 2, 2014, Kenoh and Ohara won the 2014 NTV G+ Cup Junior Heavyweight Tag League by defeating Daisuke Harada and Quiet Storm in the finals. On October 12, Kenoh and Ohara defeated Atsushi Kotoge and Taiji Ishimori to win the GHC Junior Heavyweight Tag Team Championship. They lost the title to El Desperado and Taka Michinoku on March 15, 2015. On March 28, Kenoh signed a contract with Noah, officially ending his affiliation with Michinoku Pro. On March 19, 2016, Kenoh and Ohara won the GHC Junior Heavyweight Tag Team Championship for the second time by defeating Atsushi Kotoge and Daisuke Harada. They lost the title back to Kotoge and Harada on April 5.

On July 5, Kenoh defeated Genba Hirayanagi in a four-man tournament final to win one of Noah's three spots in New Japan Pro-Wrestling's 2016 Super J-Cup. On July 20, Kenoh defeated Gurukun Mask in his first round match in the tournament. On August 21, he was eliminated from the tournament in the second round by reigning IWGP Junior Heavyweight Champion Kushida.

==== Move to heavyweight (2016-present) ====
On December 23, 2016, after losing to Takashi Sugiura and Alejandro Saez, Kenoh officially announced the break up of Kenohara. Kenoh and Ohara wrestled their last match as a team on December 24, defeating Taiji Ishimori and Hitoshi Kumano.

Kenoh's heavyweight debut was on January 7, 2017, in a tag team match where he and partner Masa Kitamiya defeated Akitoshi Saito and Muhammad Yone. Following this match, the pairing made a challenge to GHC Tag Team Championship holders Go Shiozaki and Maybach Taniguchi to a title match. On January 21, Kenoh and Kitamiya defeated Shiozaki and Taniguchi to become the new GHC Tag Team Champions.

On February 24, Kenoh turned on Kitamiya, forming an alliance with Takashi Sugiura, which led to the two being stripped of the tag team title. This led to a match on March 12, where Kenoh and Sugiura defeated Kitamiya and Muhammad Yone to win the vacant GHC Tag Team Championship. They lost the title to Maybach Taniguchi and Naomichi Marufuji on April 14.

On November 19, Kenoh defeated Go Shiozaki in the finals to win the 2017 Global League. On December 22, Kenoh defeated Eddie Edwards to win the GHC Heavyweight Championship for the first time and was afterwards confronted by the returning Kaito Kiyomiya, who challenged him to a title match. This led to a match on January 6, where Kenoh defeated Kiyomiya for his first successful defense and along with Sugiura turned on Kiyomiya after the match.

On February 6, 2018, he defeated Yuko Miyamoto for his second successful defense and afterwards accepted a challenge from his ally Takashi Sugiura. This led to a match on March 11, where he lost the title to Sugiura in his third defense. The two then made it to the finals of the 2018 Global Tag League where they lost to former ally Kaito Kiyomiya and Go Shiozaki.

He gained a measure of revenge on Kiyomiya by defeating him on June 10 to earn a chance to regain the GHC Heavyweight Championship, leading to a match on June 26, where he failed to regain the title from Takashi Sugiura.

As Naomichi Marufuji and Akitoshi Saito vacated the GHC Tag Team Championship on November 28, a tournament to determine new champions happened on December 7. Kenoh tagged with former partner Masa Kitamiya, but would fail to capture the titles on the finals against Katsuhiko Nakajima and Go Shiozaki.

After Kaito Kiyomiya defeated Takashi Sugiura at the Great Voyage in Yokohama, Kenoh came to the ring and challenged the new champion. This led to a title match on January 6, where he was defeated by Kiyomiya.

On March 10, 2019, Kiyomiya defended the GHC Heavyweight Title against Naomichi Marufuji, after the match, Kenoh came to the ring and invited the champion to be his partner for Global Tag League, and Kiyomiya accepted.

On May 4, 2019, at a NOAH event held in Korakuen Hall, Kenoh established the faction known as Kongo.

On January 8, 2022, at Wrestle Kingdom 16 held in Yokohama Arena, Kongo, led by Kenoh, was defeated by Los Ingobernables de Japon in a 10-man tag team match.

On January 21, 2023, in the main event of WRESTLE KINGDOM 17 in Yokohama Arena, Kenoh faced Los Ingobernables de Japon leader Tetsuya Naito but was defeated.

During his 15th-anniversary show, Kenoh announced the dissolution of "Kongo" and stated, "Pursuing stability means forsaking evolution."

== Championships and accomplishments ==
- All Japan Pro Wrestling
  - World Tag Team Championship (1 time) - with Manabu Soya
- Dragon Gate
  - Open the Twin Gate Championship (1 time) - with Shuji Kondo
- Michinoku Pro Wrestling
  - Tohoku Junior Heavyweight Championship (3 times)
  - Futaritabi Tag Team Tournament (2010) – with Rui Hiugaji
- Pro Wrestling Illustrated
  - Ranked No. 35 of the top 500 singles wrestlers in the PWI 500 in 2024
- Pro Wrestling Noah
  - GHC Heavyweight Championship (4 times)
  - GHC National Championship (2 times)
  - GHC Junior Heavyweight Tag Team Championship (2 times) – with Hajime Ohara
  - GHC Tag Team Championship (4 times) – with Masa Kitamiya (1), Takashi Sugiura (1), Ulka Sasaki (1) and Naomichi Marufuji (1)
  - Global League/N-1 Victory (2017, 2019)
  - NTV G+ Cup Junior Heavyweight Tag League (2014) – with Hajime Ohara
  - Super J-Cup Qualifying Tournament B (2016)
- Tokyo Sports
  - Fighting Spirit Award (2023)
