= List of Pro Wrestling Noah personnel =

Pro Wrestling Noah is a Japanese professional wrestling promotion based in Shinjuku, Tokyo, and part of the CyberFight umbrella promotion. Noah personnel consists of professional wrestlers, ring announcers, referees, trainers, and various other positions.

== Background ==
Noah contracts typically range from developmental deals for dojo trainees to full-time contracts. Personnel appear on untelevised live events and on televised events which are aired on various broadcasters or on CyberFight's own international streaming service, Wrestle Universe.

Personnel is organized by their role in Noah. The performer's ring name is listed on the left and their real name is on the right. This list also acknowledges which stable (referred to by Noah as "units") a wrestler is a part of.

As of 2025, there are five central units in Noah:

- Main Unit (Note: Simply referred to as "Noah" or Seikigun (正規軍; lit. "regular army"))
- Los Tranquilos de Japón
- Team 2000X
- Team Noah
- White Raven Squad

In addition to the promotion's seven central units, wrestlers who appear on a part-time basis are also listed.

As Noah has working relationships with WWE, International Wrestling Revolution Group (IWRG) and numerous Japanese promotions, wrestlers from these promotions may appear on Noah events and have their home promotions or stables from their home promotions listed as their affiliated unit.

== Roster ==
=== Regulars ===
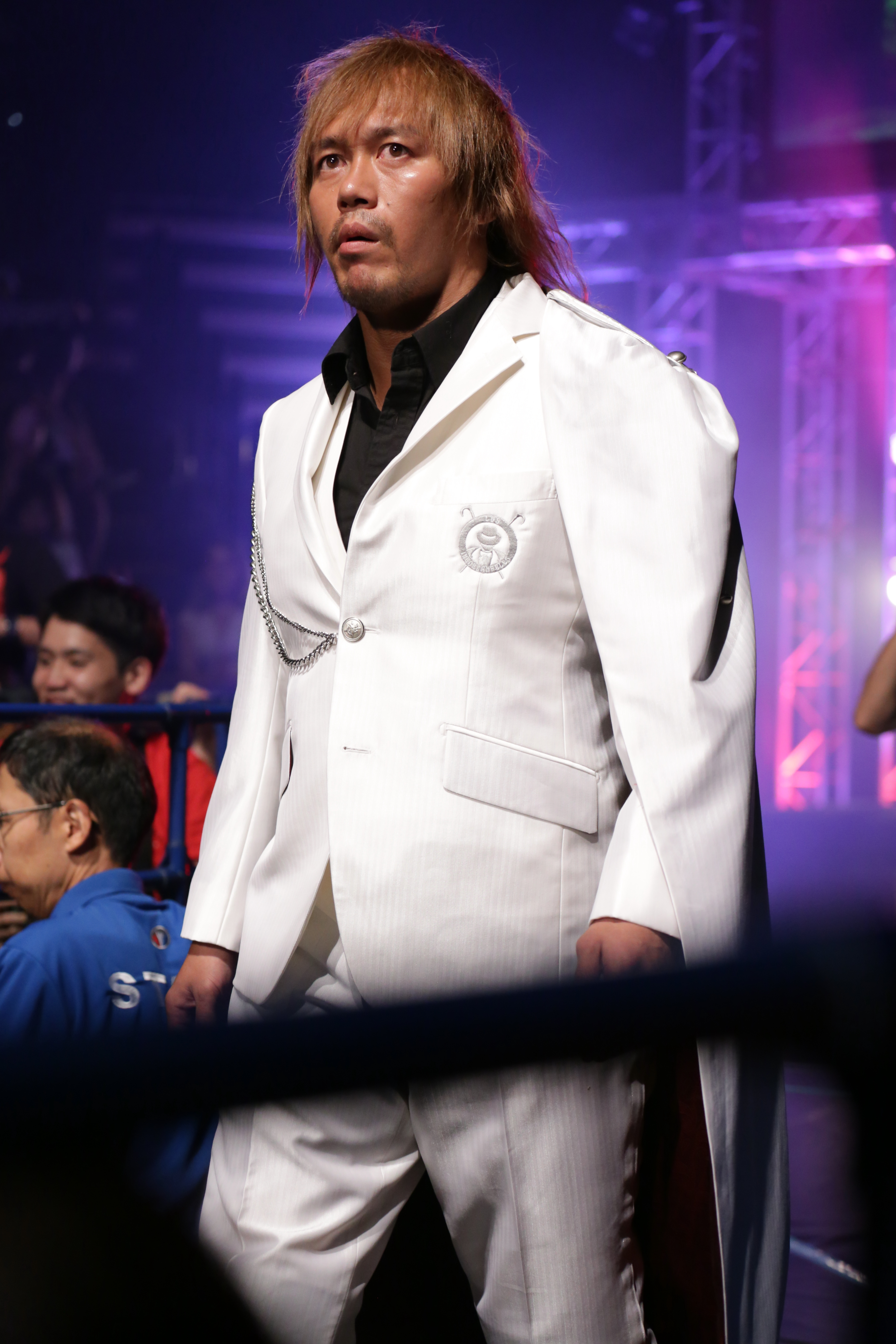
Tetsuya Naito

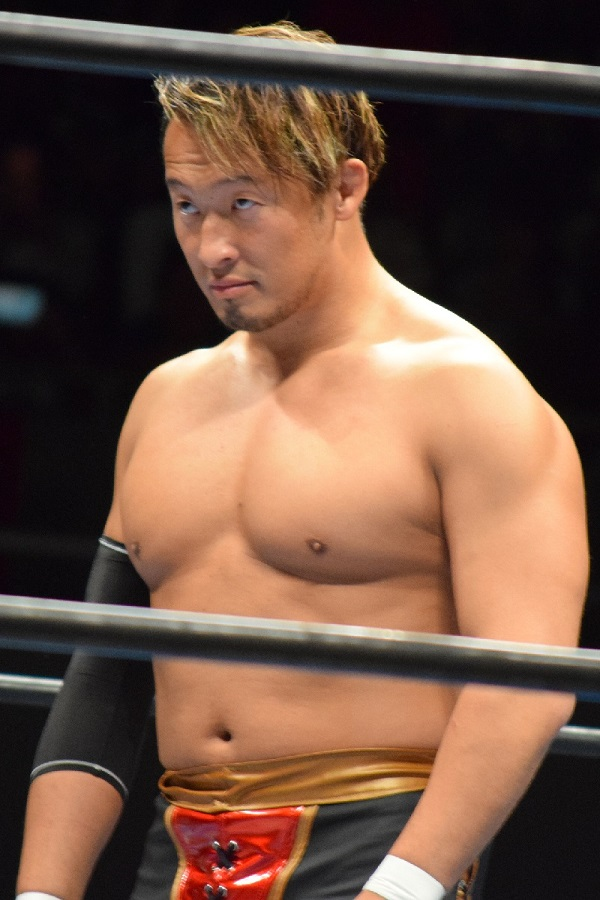
Naomichi Marufuji

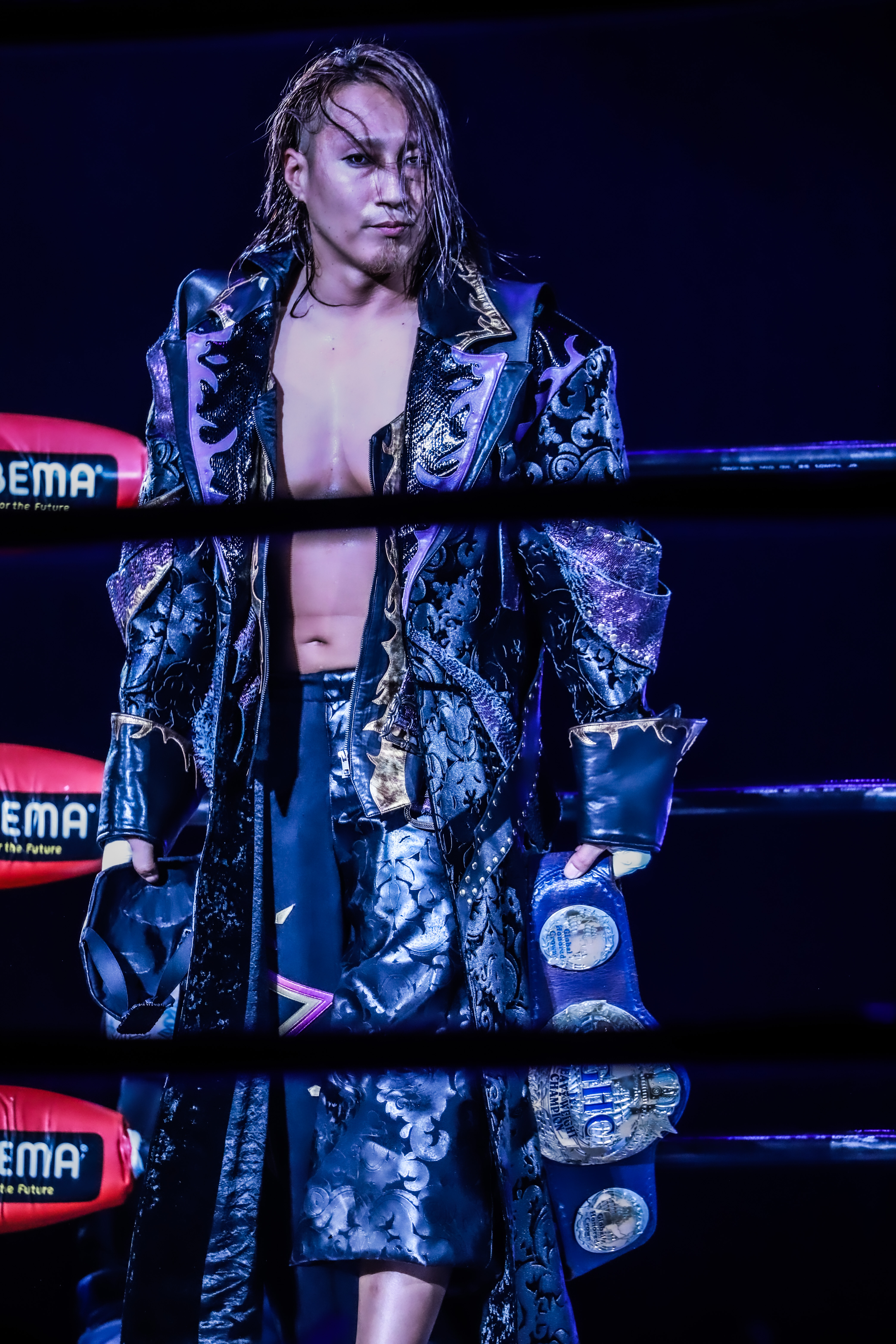
Hayata

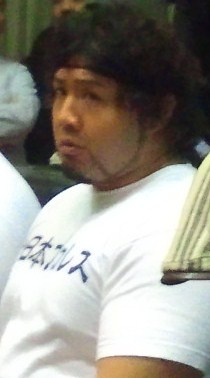
Manabu Soya

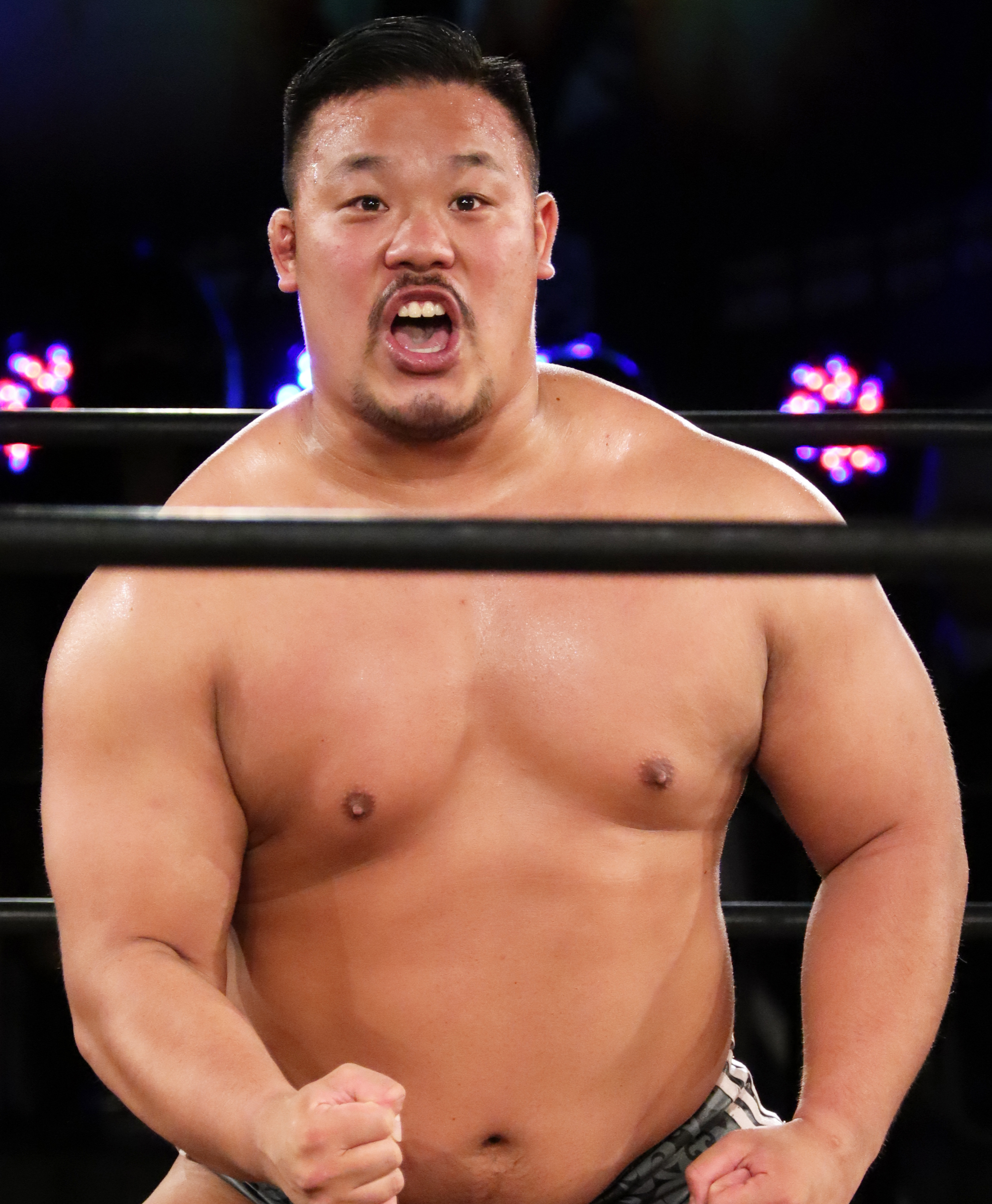
Yuki Iino

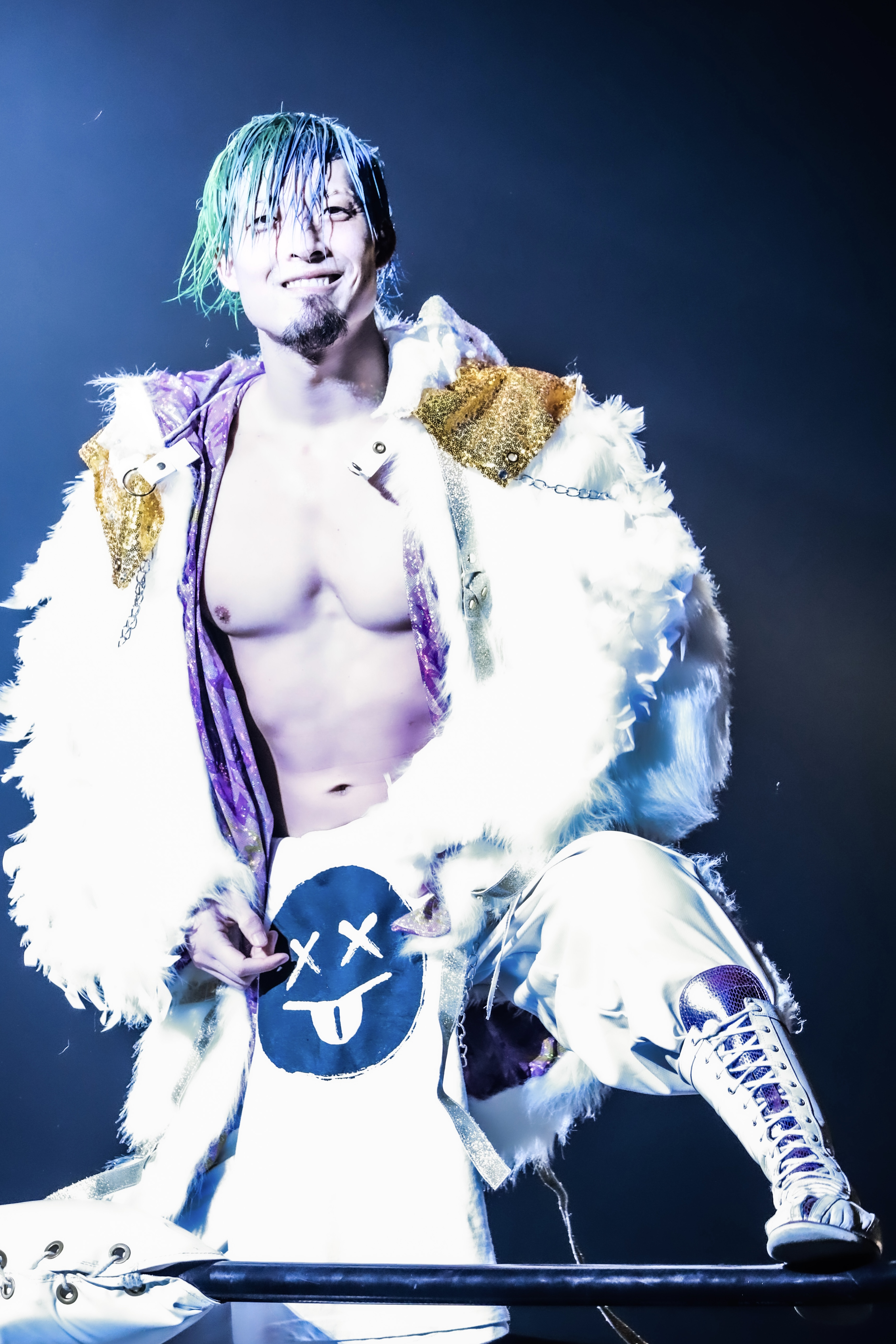
Yo-Hey

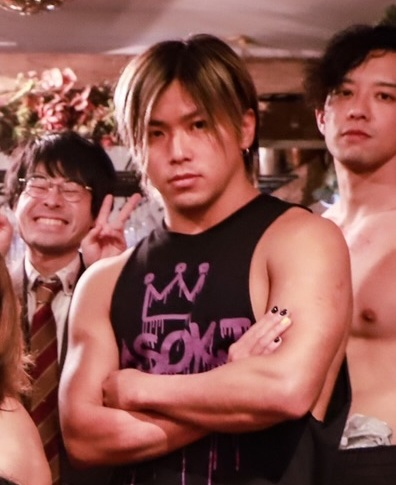
Jun Masaoka

Ring name	Real name	Unit	Notes
Alejandro	Kohei Fujimura	Main Unit	
Alpha Wolf	Fernando Antonio Cornejo Soto	Team 2000X	Freelancer
Amakusa	Yuki Sato	Main Unit	
Atsushi Kotoge	Atsushi Kotoge	Team Noah (L)	
Black Menso-re	Yohei Nakajima	Main Unit	Freelancer
Bushi	Tetsuya Shimizu	Los Tranquilos de Japón	Freelancer
Chen	Sean Tan Li Hao	Unaffiliated	Freelancer
Daiki Inaba	Daiki Inaba	Main Unit	
Daiki Odashima	Daiki Odashima	Main Unit	
Doc Gallows	Andrew Hankinson	Unaffiliated	Freelancer
Dragon Bane	Undisclosed (Note: In lucha libre the true identity, birth name, etc. of masked wrestlers is kept secret from the general public. News media neither report nor speculate on real names even if they may be able to find them, purely out of respect for lucha libre traditions.)	Main Unit	
Eita	Eita Kobayashi	Main Unit	
Hajime Ohara	Hajime Ohara	Team Noah	
Harutoki	Unknown	Main Unit	
Hayata	Yohei Hayata	White Raven Squad	GHC 200 Champion
Hi69	Hiroki Tanabe	Team Noah	
Hiroto Tsuruya	Hiroto Tsuruya	Main Unit	
Hiroya Namiki	Hiroya Namiki	Main Unit	
Jun Masaoka	Jun Masaoka	Team 2000X	Freelancer; GHC Junior Heavyweight Tag Team Championship
Junta Miyawaki	Junta Miyawaki	Main Unit	
Kai Fujimura	Kai Fujimura	Team 2000X	GHC Junior Heavyweight Champion
Kaito Kiyomiya	Kaito Kiyomiya	Main Unit	
Karl Anderson	Chad Allegra	Unaffiliated	Freelancer
Katsumi Inahata	Katsumi Inahata	Main Unit	
Kazuyuki Fujita	Kazuyuki Fujita	Main Unit	
Kenoh	Daisuke Nakae	Main Unit	
Kenta	Kenta Kobayashi	White Raven Squad (L)	
Kid Lykos	Ethan Beach	Unaffiliated	Freelancer
Kid Lykos II	Joe Newboult	Unaffiliated	Freelancer
Kieron Lacey	Unknown	Unaffiliated	Freelancer
Knull	Unknown	Team 2000X	Freelancer
Kouga	Yu Owada	Main Unit	
Manabu Soya	Manabu Soya	Main Unit	GHC Tag Team Champion
Mark Trew	Unknown	Unaffiliated	Freelancer
Masa Kitamiya	Mitsuhiro Kitamiya	Team 2000X	
Midori Takahashi	Midori Takahashi	Main Unit	
Muhammad Yone	Satoshi Yoneyama	Team Noah	
Naomichi Marufuji	Naomichi Marufuji	Main Unit	Executive Vice President of CyberFight; GHC National Champion
Ozawa	Taishi Ozawa	Team 2000X (L)	
Ryusei	Ryusei Yasuda	Los Tranquilos de Japón	
Shane Haste	Shane Veryzer	White Raven Squad	Freelancer
Shuhei Taniguchi	Shuhei Taniguchi	Main Unit	
Shuji Kondo	Shuji Kondo	Main Unit	Freelancer
Super Crazy	Francisco Rueda	Main Unit	Freelancer
Tadasuke	Tadasuke Yoshida	Team 2000X	
Takashi Sugiura	Takashi Sugiura	Team 2000X	
Tetsuya Endo	Tetsuya Endō	White Raven Squad	
Tetsuya Naito	Tetsuya Naito	Los Tranquilos de Japón	Freelancer; GHC Heavyweight Champion
Ulka Sasaki	Yuta Sasaki	White Raven Squad	
Yo-Hey	Yohei Fujita	Team 2000X	GHC Junior Heavyweight Tag Team Championship
Yoshi Tatsu	Naofumi Yamamoto	Team 2000X	Freelancer
Yoshiki Inamura	Yoshiki Inamura	Main Unit	
Yuki Iino	Yuki Iino	Main Unit	GHC Tag Team Champion
Yuto Koyanagi	Yuto Koyanagi	Main Unit	

=== Monday Magic ===
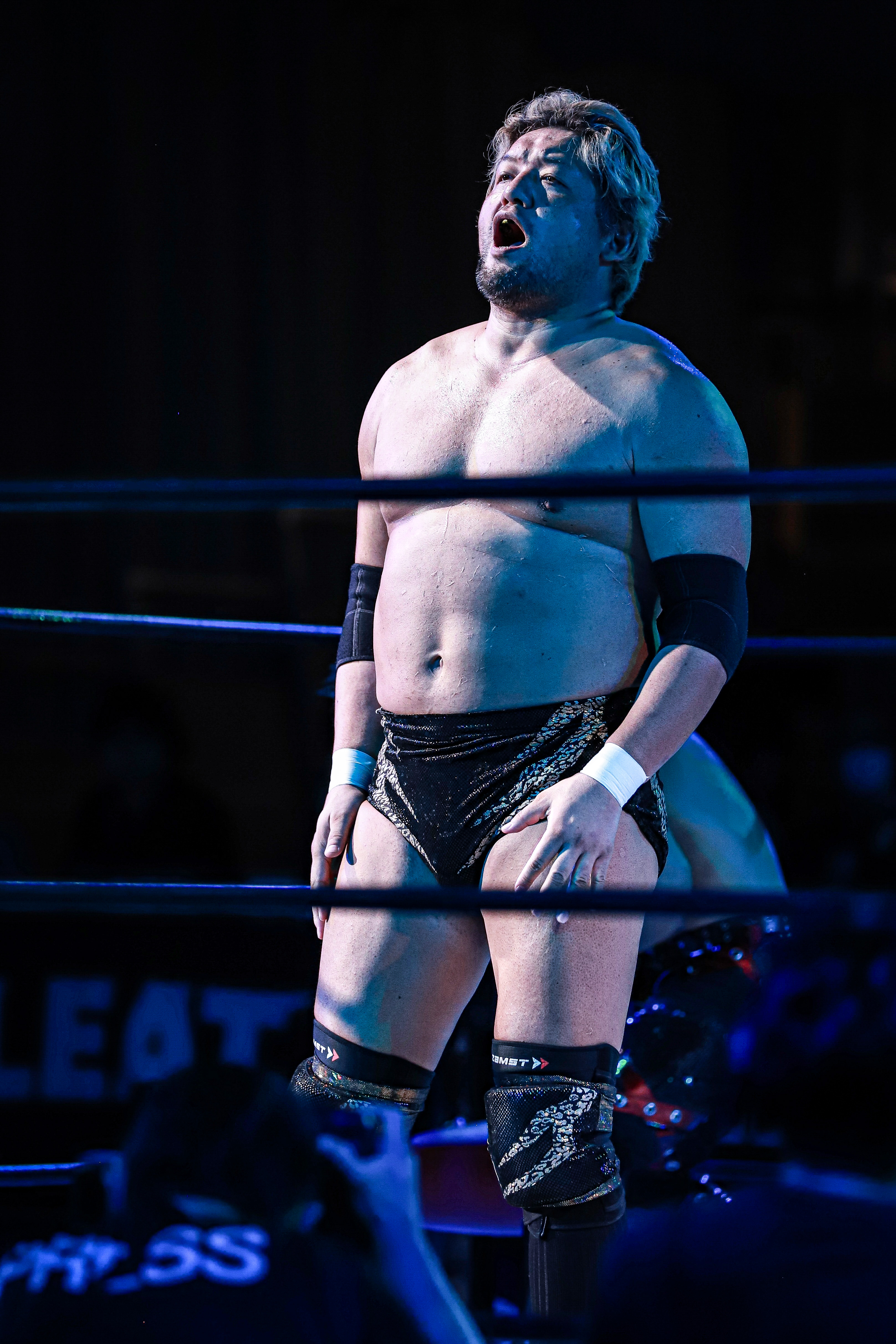
Shuji Ishikawa

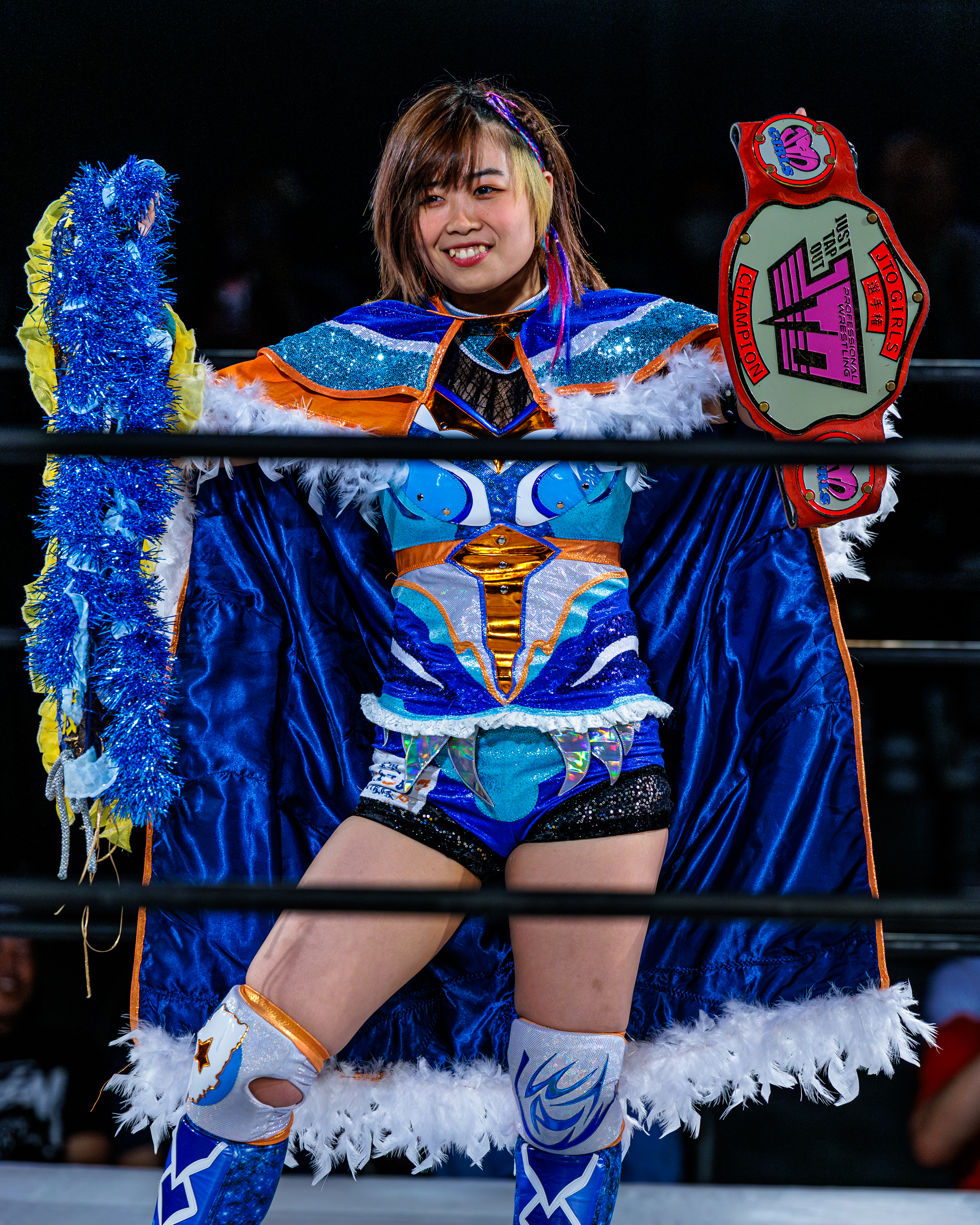
Mirai

Ring name	Real name	Notes
Great Sakuya	Riko Kawahata	Signed to Marvelous That's Women Pro Wrestling
Masato Tanaka	Masato Tanaka	Signed to Pro Wrestling Zero1
Mirai	Mirai Ito	Signed to Michinoku Pro Wrestling; GHC Women's Champion
Miyuki Takase	Miyuki Takase	Signed to Sendai Girls' Pro Wrestling
Shuji Ishikawa	Shuji Ishikawa	Signed to Pro-Wrestling Evolution; GHC Openweight Hardcore Champion
Takumi Iroha	Takumi Iroha	Signed to Marvelous That's Women Pro Wrestling
Titus Alexander	Titus Jimenez	Freelancer

== Referees ==
Ring name	Real name	Notes
Keisuke Tsukagoji	Keisuke Tsukagoji	
Shinichi Nakayama	Shinichi Nakayama	
Shuichi Nishinaga	Shuichi Nishinaga	

== Other personnel ==
Ring name	Real name	Notes
G-Man	Unknown	Ring Announcer
Keiji Muto	Keiji Muto	Scouting Advisor
Kendo Kashin	Tokimitsu Ishizawa	Booker; Producer
Kento Nagahama	Kento Nagahama	Trainer
Kevin Von Erich	Kevin Adkisson	Global Honored Crown Committee Member
Nosawa Rongai	Kazushige Nosawa	Producer
Ryo Okuda	Ryo Okuda	Ring Announcer
Takeshi Rikio	Takeshi Inoue	Global Honored Crown Committee Member

=== Corporate ===
Name	Role
Akito Nishigaki	Director
Narihiro Takeda	Director
Sanshiro Takagi	Executive Vice President of CyberFight
Susumu Fujita	Representative Director and Chairman of CyberAgent
Yasuo Okamoto	President and Representative Director of CyberFight

== Alumni ==
=== Native ===
- Akihiko Ito
- Akira Taue
- Akitoshi Saito
- Atsushi Aoki
- B×B Hulk
- Daisuke Harada
- DJ Nira
- El Desperado
- Genba Hirayanagi
- Genichiro Tenryu
- Go Shiozaki
- Haruka Eigen
- Hiro Tonai
- Hiroshi Tanahashi
- Ikuto Hidaka
- Ippei Ota
- Jun Izumida
- Kaji Tomato
- Kappa Kozou
- Katsuhiko Nakajima
- Kazunari Murakami
- Kazushi Sakuraba
- Keiji Mutoh
- Kendo Kashin
- Kensuke Sasaki
- Kenta Kobashi
- Kentaro Shiga
- Kento Miyahara
- Kishin Kawabata
- Kota Ibushi
- Kotaro Suzuki
- Makoto Hashi
- Masahiro Chono
- Masahito Kakihara
- Masao Inoue
- Masashi Aoyagi
- Masato Inaba
- Masato Tanaka
- Masato Yoshino
- Masaaki Mochizuki
- Minoru Fujita
- Minoru Suzuki
- Mitsuharu Misawa
- Mitsuo Momota
- Musashi
- Naruki Doi
- Rising Hayato
- Ryohei Oiwa
- Satoru Asako
- Satoshi Kojima
- Shingo Takagi
- Shinya Hashimoto
- Shinya Ishikawa
- Shiro Tomoyose
- Shoki Kitamura
- Suwa
- Taichi
- Taiji Ishimori
- Taka Michinoku
- Takao Omori
- Takashi Iizuka
- Takashi Okita
- Takeshi Morishima
- Takeshi Rikio
- Takuma Sano
- Takuya Nomura
- Tamon Honda
- Tatsuhito Takaiwa
- Toru Yano
- Toshiaki Kawada
- Tsuyoshi Kikuchi
- Yoshihiro Takayama
- Yoshinari Ogawa
- Yoshinobu Kanemaru
- Yuji Nagata

=== Non-Japanese ===
- A. C. H.
- Andy Dalton
- Anthony Greene
- Bison Smith
- Bobby Fish
- Bram
- Brian Cage
- Bryan Danielson
- Buchanan
- Chris Hero
- Claudio Castagnoli
- Cody Hall
- Colt Cabana
- D'Lo Brown
- Dante Leon
- Davey Boy Smith Jr.
- Davey Richards
- Donovan Morgan
- Doug Williams
- Eddie Edwards
- El Hijo de Dr. Wagner Jr.
- Hanson
- Jack Gamble
- Jay Briscoe
- Jon Webb
- Jonah Rock
- Josh Briggs
- Juventud Guerrera
- Keith Walker
- Lance Archer
- LJ Cleary
- Low Ki
- Magnus
- Mark Briscoe
- Marshall Von Erich
- Matt Striker
- Michael Modest
- Mikey Nicholls
- Moose
- Nigel McGuinness
- Ninja Mack
- Omos
- Randy Reign
- Raymond Rowe
- Richard Slinger
- Ricky Marvin
- Robbie E
- Rocky Romero
- Roderick Strong
- Ross Von Erich
- Samoa Joe
- Scorpio
- Shane Haste
- Sheldon Jean
- Slex
- Tavion Heights
- Vader
- Zack Sabre Jr.

=== Joshi talent ===
- Brooke Havok
- Haruka Umesaki
- Jungle Kyona
- Kana
- Maya Yukihi
- Nagisa Nozaki
- Saori Anou
- Sawako Shimono
- Sumire Natsu

=== Stables ===
- All Rebellion
- Bad Intentions
- Burning
- Choukibou-gun
- Dangan Yankies
- Good Looking Guys
- K.E.S.
- Kongo (professional wrestling)
- Los Perros del Mal de Japón
- No Fear
- Real
- RO&D
- Stinger (professional wrestling)
- Sugiura-gun
- TMDK
- World Class Tag Team
