= Naomichi =

- Gender: Male

Origin
- Origin: Japanese
- Meaning: Different meanings depending on the kanji used

Naomichi (written: 直道, 直通, 直倫 or 正道) is a masculine Japanese given name. Notable people with the name include:

- Naomichi Donoue (堂上 直倫; born 1988), Japanese baseball player
- Naomichi Hanazono (花園 直道; born 1988), Japanese classical dance performer and singer
- Naomichi Hirama (平間 直道; born 1987), Japanese footballer
- Naomichi Marufuji (丸藤 正道; born 1979), Japanese professional wrestler
- Naomichi Ozaki (尾崎 直道; born 1956), Japanese golfer
- Naomichi Suzuki (鈴木 直道; born 1981), Japanese politician
- Naomichi Ueda (植田 直通; born 1994), Japanese footballer

== Fictional characters ==
- Naomichi Hinode (日ノ出直道), a character in the manga series Gender-Swap at the Delinquent Academy
- Naomichi Kurumada, a character from the Japanese horror adventure game Kimi ga Shine -Tasūketsu Death Game-
