= Noah Grand Ship In Nagoya 2022 =

2022 Pro Wrestling Noah event

NOAH Grand Ship In Nagoya 2022
- Promotional poster featuring Kenoh and Kaito Kiyomiya
- Promotion: CyberFight
- Brand: Pro Wrestling Noah
- Date: September 25, 2022
- City: Nagoya, Japan
- Venue: Aichi Prefectural Gymnasium
- Attendance: 1,933

Pay-per-view chronology
| ← Previous; Departure 2022 | Next → Ariake Triumph |

Grand Ship In Nagoya chronology
| ← Previous — | Next → 2023 |

NOAH Grand Ship In Nagoya 2022 was a professional wrestling event promoted by CyberFight's sub-brand Pro Wrestling Noah. It took place on September 25, 2022, in Nagoya, Japan, at the Aichi Prefectural Gymnasium. The event aired on CyberAgent's AbemaTV online linear television service and CyberFight's streaming service Wrestle Universe.

The event featured nine matches with four of Noah's five championships on the line. The main event saw 2022 N-1 Victory winner Kaito Kiyomiya defeat Kenoh to win the GHC Heavyweight Championship for the second time. Other top matches included Satoshi Kojima and Takashi Sugiura defeating Sugiura-gun (Hideki Suzuki and Timothy Thatcher) to win the GHC Tag Team Championship, and Atsushi Kotoge and Seiki Yoshioka defeated Stinger stablemates Chris Ridgeway and Yoshinari Ogawa to win the GHC Junior Heavyweight Tag Team Championship.

== Background ==
=== Storylines ===
The event featured nine professional wrestling matches that resulted from scripted storylines, where wrestlers portrayed villains, heroes, or less distinguishable characters in the scripted events that built tension and culminated in a wrestling match or series of matches.

=== Event ===
The event started with the confrontation between rookies Kai Fujimura and Yasutaka Yano and Los Perros del Mal de Japón's Eita and Nosawa Rongai, which solded with the victory of the latter team. The second match of the evening featured Masa Kitamiya and Yoshiki Inamura who picked up a victory against Funky Express (Akitoshi Saito and Mohammed Yone). Next, Alejandro, Extreme Tiger and Ninja Mack defeated Kongo's Hajime Ohara, Hi69 and Tadasuke. The fourth bout saw El Hijo del Dr. Wagner Jr., Jack Morris and Naomichi Marufuji defeating Daiki Inaba, Masaaki Mochizuki and Masato Tanaka in six-man tag team action. Next, Atsushi Kotoge and Seiki Yoshioka defeated Stinger stablemates Chris Ridgeway and Yoshinari Ogawa in an internal stable clash for the GHC Junior Heavyweight Tag Team Championship. Next, Satoshi Kojima and Takashi Sugiura defeated Sugiura-gun's Hideki Suzuki and Timothy Thatcher to capture the GHC Tag Team Championship. Next, Hayata defeated Yo-Hey to secure his fifth consecutive defense of the GHC Junior Heavyweight Championship. The semi main event saw Kazuyuki Fujita and Keiji Muto defeating Kongo's Katsuhiko Nakajima and Masakatsu Funaki in tag team action.

The main event portraited the confrontation between Kenoh and the winner of the 2022 edition of the N-1 Victory Kaito Kiyomiya who won his right to challenge for Kenoh's GHC Heavyweight Championship. The bout concluded with Kiyomiya's win, ending Kenho's reign at 71 days and stopping him from securing his first defense.

== Results ==
| No. | Results | Stipulations | Times |
|---|---|---|---|
| 1 | Los Perros del Mal de Japón (Eita and Nosawa Rongai) defeated Kai Fujimura and Yasutaka Yano by pinfall | Tag team match | 4:03 |
| 2 | Masa Kitamiya and Yoshiki Inamura defeated Funky Express (Akitoshi Saito and Mohammed Yone) by pinfall | Tag team match | 9:47 |
| 3 | Alejandro, Extreme Tiger and Ninja Mack defeated Kongo (Hajime Ohara, Hi69 and Tadasuke) by pinfall | Six-man tag team match | 11:24 |
| 4 | El Hijo del Dr. Wagner Jr., Jack Morris and Naomichi Marufuji defeated Daiki Inaba, Masaaki Mochizuki and Masato Tanaka by pinfall | Six-man tag team match | 13:49 |
| 5 | Stinger (Atsushi Kotoge and Seiki Yoshioka) defeated Stinger (Chris Ridgeway and Yoshinari Ogawa) (c) by pinfall | Tag team match for the GHC Junior Heavyweight Tag Team Championship | 26:56 |
| 6 | Satoshi Kojima and Takashi Sugiura defeated Sugiura-gun (Hideki Suzuki and Timothy Thatcher) (c) by pinfall | Tag team match for the GHC Tag Team Championship | 18:41 |
| 7 | Hayata (c) defeated Yo-Hey by pinfall | Singles match for the GHC Junior Heavyweight Championship | 23:45 |
| 8 | Kazuyuki Fujita and Keiji Muto defeated Kongo (Katsuhiko Nakajima and Masakatsu Funaki) by pinfall | Tag team match | 20:35 |
| 9 | Kaito Kiyomiya defeated Kenoh (c) by pinfall | Singles match for the GHC Heavyweight Championship | 26:14 |
(c) / – the champion(s) heading into the match
