= Universe Cup =

Professional wrestling tournament

- Promotions: CyberFight
- Brands: See below
- Date: March 9 – April 6, 2026
- City: Tokyo, Japan
- Venue: Shinjuku Face

The Universe Cup, also promoted as the 1st Universe Cup (第1回 UNIVERSE CUP, Daiikkai Yunibāsu Kappu), was a professional wrestling tournament organized by CyberFight. The tournament featured eight wrestlers from various promotions and brands broadcast on CyberFight's streaming service, Wrestle Universe.

Naomichi Marufuji of Pro Wrestling Noah won the tournament by defeating Sanshiro Takagi of DDT Pro-Wrestling in the final.

== Background ==
On January 19, 2026, at Pro Wrestling Noah's Monday Magic Rising Sun Season ep. 1, Nosawa Rongai announced that an eight-man tournament would be held between March and April and broadcast on CyberFight's video on demand service Wrestle Universe. The tournament would showcase the different promotions and brands that are regularly broadcast on Wrestle Universe. The participants and first round match-ups were announced on February 9.

Participants
Entrant	Representing
Great Mummy	Monday Magic
The Great Sasuke	Michinoku Pro Wrestling
Hayabusa	Pro Wrestling Zero1
Yumehito Imanari	Ganbare☆Pro-Wrestling
Isami Kodaka	Pro-Wrestling Basara
Kuroshio Tokyo Japan	Pro-Wrestling Uptown
Naomichi Marufuji	Pro Wrestling Noah
Sanshiro Takagi	DDT Pro-Wrestling

== Tournament ==
The tournament was held across two shows on March 9 and April 6 at Shinjuku Face.

First round March 9
Sanshiro Takagi	Pin
Great Mummy	8:23
Isami Kodaka	12:24
The Great Sasuke	Pin
Naomichi Marufuji	Sub
Kuroshio Tokyo Japan	9:12
Hayabusa	Pin
Yumehito Imanari	14:06

Semifinals; April 6
Sanshiro Takagi	Pin
The Great Sasuke	14:47
Naomichi Marufuji	Sub
Hayabusa	14:52

Final; April 6
Sanshiro Takagi	17:33
Naomichi Marufuji	Sub

== Results ==
=== Night 1 ===
The first night took place at Shinjuku Face in Tokyo on March 9, 2026.

No.	Results	Stipulations	Times
1	Takeru Inoue and Sentaro Motojima defeated Yuki Toki and Nobuhiko Kimura by submission	Tag team match	8:56
2	Sanshiro Takagi defeated Great Mummy by pinfall	First round singles match in the 1st Universe Cup	8:23
3	Naomichi Marufuji defeated Kuroshio Tokyo Japan by submission	First round singles match in the 1st Universe Cup	9:12
4	Mayu Iwatani, Mika Iwata and Mio Momono vs. Takumi Iroha, Miyuki Takase and Utami Hayashishita ended in a draw	Six-woman tag team match	20:00
5	The Great Sasuke defeated Isami Kodaka by pinfall	First round singles match in the 1st Universe Cup	12:24
6	Hayabusa defeated Yumehito Imanari by pinfall	First round singles match in the 1st Universe Cup	14:06

=== Night 2 ===
The second night took place at Shinjuku Face in Tokyo on April 6, 2026.

No.	Results	Stipulations	Times
1	Naomichi Marufuji defeated Hayabusa by submission	Semifinal singles match in the 1st Universe Cup	14:52
2	Sanshiro Takagi defeated The Great Sasuke by pinfall	Semifinal singles match in the 1st Universe Cup	14:47
3	Miyu Yamashita defeated Shino Suzuki by pinfall	Singles match	7:44
4	Kaito Kiyomiya, Kuroshio Tokyo Japan, Takeshi Masada and Yumehito Imanari defeated Masato Tanaka, Isami Kodaka, Taro Nohashi and Great Mummy by pinfall	Eight-man tag team match	9:15
5	Yuna won by last eliminating Senka Akatsuki (Note: Order of entrance: Senka Akatsuki, Seri Yamaoka, Yuna, Momoka Hanazono, Yuuri, Yuki Mashiro, Sora Ayame, Manami, Great Sakuya, and Megaton Order of elimination: Megaton, Manami, Sora Ayame, Yuuri, Great Sakuya, Yuki Mashiro, Seri Yamaoka, Momoka Hanazono, and Senka Akatsuki)	Ten-woman Magic Rumble	26:41
6	Naomichi Marufuji defeated Sanshiro Takagi by submission	Final singles match in the 1st Universe Cup	17:33

== See also ==
- CyberFight
