= Noah Departure 2022 =

2022 Pro Wrestling Noah event

- Promotional poster featuring Hayata and Shuji Kondo
- Promotion: CyberFight
- Brand(s): Pro Wrestling Noah
- Date: August 5, 2022
- City: Tokyo, Japan
- Venue: Korakuen Hall
- Attendance: 616

Pay-per-view chronology
← Previous; Destination 2022	Next → Grand Ship In Nagoya

Noah Departure 2022 was a professional wrestling event promoted by CyberFight's sub-brand Pro Wrestling Noah. It took place on August 5, 2022, in Tokyo, Japan, at the Korakuen Hall. The event aired on CyberAgent's AbemaTV online linear television service and CyberFight's streaming service Wrestle Universe.

Eight matches were contested at the event. The main event saw Hayata defeat Shuji Kondo to retain the GHC Junior Heavyweight Championship. In another prominent match, Kinya Okada defeated Yoshiki Inamura to earn a spot in the 2022 N-1 Victory.

== Background ==
=== Storylines ===
The event featured eight professional wrestling matches that resulted from scripted storylines, where wrestlers portrayed villains, heroes, or less distinguishable characters in the scripted events that built tension and culminated in a wrestling match or series of matches.

=== Event ===
The evening started with Masa Kitamiya and Mohammed Yone picking a victory over Masaaki Mochizuki and Shuhei Taniguchi. Next, Kai Fujimura and Stinger (Yoshinari Ogawa & Yuya Susumu) defeated Los Perros del Mal de Japón (Eita, Nosawa Rongai and Super Crazy) in six-man tag team action. In the third bout, Kongo's Katsuhiko Nakajima and Manabu Soya defeated Anthony Greene and Stallion Rogers. The fourth confrontation saw Daisuke Harada, Ninja Mack and Seiki Yoshioka overcoming the team of Atsushi Kotoge, Dante Leon and Yo-Hey. Next, Alejandro, El Hijo del Santo, Kaito Kiyomiya and Último Dragón defeated Kongo (Hajime Ohara, Hi69, Kenoh and Tadasuke). In the sixth match, Kinya Okada defeated Yoshiki Inamura to obtain a spot in the blocks of the 2022 N-1 Victory. In the semi main event, Go Shiozaki, Naomichi Marufuji and Takashi Sugiura defeated Daiki Inaba, Masato Tanaka and Satoshi Kojima.

The main event portraited the confrontation between Hayata and Shuji Kondo for the GHC Junior Heavyweight Championship. Hayata successfully retained the title and secured the third consecutive defense.

== Results ==
No.	Results	Stipulations	Times
1	Masa Kitamiya and Mohammed Yone defeated Masaaki Mochizuki and Shuhei Taniguchi by pinfall	Tag team match	9:10
2	Kai Fujimura and Stinger (Yoshinari Ogawa & Yuya Susumu) defeated Los Perros del Mal de Japón (Eita, Nosawa Rongai and Super Crazy) by pinfall	Six-man tag team match	6:22
3	Kongo (Katsuhiko Nakajima and Manabu Soya) defeated Anthony Greene and Stallion Rogers by pinfall	Tag team match	10:00
4	Daisuke Harada, Ninja Mack and Seiki Yoshioka defeated Atsushi Kotoge, Dante Leon and Yo-Hey by pinfall	Six-man tag team match	13:48
5	Alejandro, El Hijo del Santo, Kaito Kiyomiya and Último Dragón defeated Kongo (Hajime Ohara, Hi69, Kenoh and Tadasuke) by pinfall	Eight-man tag team match	7:53
6	Kinya Okada defeated Yoshiki Inamura by pinfall	N-1 Victory qualification match	15:18
7	Go Shiozaki, Naomichi Marufuji and Takashi Sugiura defeated Daiki Inaba, Masato Tanaka and Satoshi Kojima by pinfall	Six-man tag team match	17:56
8	Hayata (c) defeated Shuji Kondo by pinfall	Singles match for the GHC Junior Heavyweight Championship	19:03
(c) / – the champion(s) heading into the match
