= Super J-Cup (2009) =

Professional wrestling event in Tokyo, Japan

Super J-Cup: 5th Stage
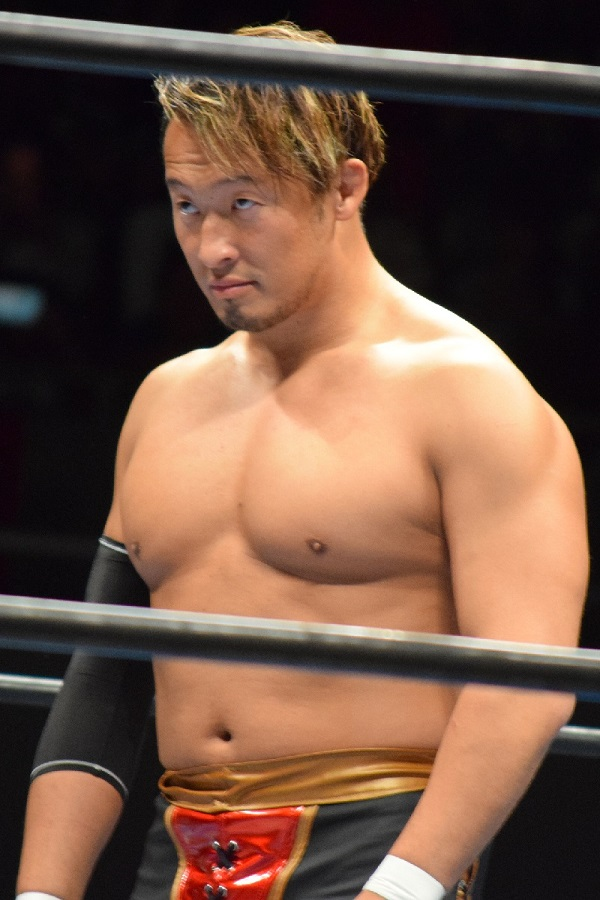
- Tournament winner Naomichi Marufuji
- Venue: Korakuen Hall
- Location: Tokyo, Japan
- Start date: December 22, 2009
- End date: December 23, 2009

Champion
- Naomichi Marufuji

Super J-Cup: 5th Stage – Land of Confusion was the fifth Super J-Cup professional wrestling single-elimination tournament produced by New Japan Pro-Wrestling (NJPW). It was a two-night event taking place on December 22 and December 23, 2009 at the Korakuen Hall in Tokyo, Japan. The interpromotional tournament featured junior heavyweight wrestlers from various Japanese promotions, marking its return after a five-year hiatus, last held in 2004. This was the second time that NJPW was hosting the event, the first time being the inaugural tournament in 1994, while the 1995, 2000 and 2004 editions were hosted by different promotions.

2004 winner Naomichi Marufuji defeated Prince Devitt in the final round to win the 2009 Super J-Cup, thus winning his second consecutive Super J-Cup tournament. The winner of the tournament would receive an IWGP Junior Heavyweight Championship opportunity at Wrestle Kingdom IV in Tokyo Dome on January 4, 2010.

== Background ==
Jushin Thunder Liger announced at the 2009 G1 Tag League Finals on November 1, 2009, that the originator of the Super J-Cup, New Japan Pro-Wrestling, would revive the concept at Christmas! New Japan presents "Super J-Cup: 5th Stage" at Korakuen Hall in Tokyo over two nights on December 22 and 23. The tournament winner would challenge Tiger Mask for the IWGP Junior Heavyweight Championship at Wrestle Kingdom IV in Tokyo Dome on January 4, 2010.

== Participants ==
Name:	Promotion:	Championship held:
Akira	New Japan Pro-Wrestling	–
Atsushi Aoki	Pro Wrestling Noah	–
Danshoku Dino	Dramatic Dream Team	–
Gedo	New Japan Pro-Wrestling	–
Gentaro	Pro Wrestling Freedoms	Independent World Junior Heavyweight Championship
Hayato Fujita	Michinoku Pro Wrestling	–
Jado	New Japan Pro-Wrestling	–
Jushin Thunder Liger	New Japan Pro-Wrestling	–
Koji Kanemoto	New Japan Pro-Wrestling	–
Kota Ibushi	Dramatic Dream Team	–
Naomichi Marufuji	Pro Wrestling Noah	–
Prince Devitt	New Japan Pro-Wrestling	IWGP Junior Heavyweight Tag Team Championship
Ryusuke Taguchi	New Japan Pro-Wrestling	IWGP Junior Heavyweight Tag Team Championship
Taichi	New Japan Pro-Wrestling	–
Tigers Mask	Osaka Pro Wrestling	–
Yamato	Dragon Gate	–

== December 22 ==
Super J-Cup: 5th Stage
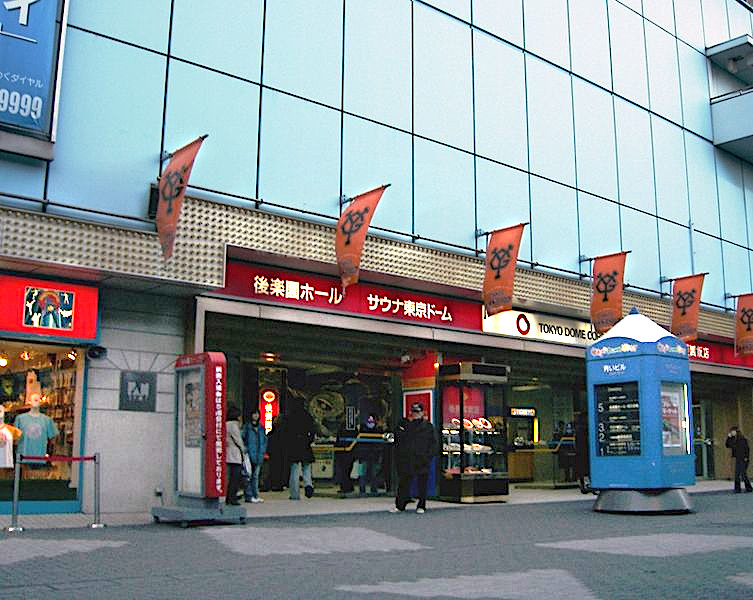
- Korakuen Hall
- Promotion: New Japan Pro-Wrestling
- Date: December 22, 2009; December 23, 2009
- City: Tokyo, Japan
- Venue: Korakuen Hall
- Attendance: December 22: 2,020; December 23: 2,020
- Tagline: Land of Confusion

Super J-Cup chronology
← Previous; Super J-Cup: 4th Stage	Next → Super J-Cup: 6th Stage

The first round of the Super J-Cup: 5th Stage was held at the Korakuen Hall in Tokyo, Japan on December 22, 2009.

In the opening match of the tournament, Tigers Mask took on Taichi. Taichi hit a front high kick to send Mask out of the ring. Tigers Mask returned to the ring and executed a back kick to slow Taichi's momentum and then Taichi countered with a Brainbuster. After a back and forth action, Tigers Mask executed a Tigers Suplex Hold on Taichi and applied a grounded octopus stretch to win the match by submission.

Ryusuke Taguchi followed by defeating Gentaro after executing a Dodon. Yamato won the third match by making Akira submit to a double kneelock. Danshoku Dino defeated Jado in the next match by pinning him with a Gedo Clutch. Jado's tag team partner Gedo, the 1994 semi-finalist and 1995 runner-up of the Super J-Cup, participated in his third Super J-Cup as he defeated Kota Ibushi by pinning him with a Gedo Clutch. Prince Devitt defeated Atsushi Aoki in the next match by hitting a Reverse Bloody Sunday. Junior heavyweight veteran Koji Kanemoto entered his first Super J-Cup by taking on Hayato Fujita, whom he defeated by making him tap out to an ankle hold. The main event and the last match of the first round featured two-time Super J-Cup winner and creator Jushin Thunder Liger taking on previous tournament winner Naomichi Marufuji. After a back and forth match, Marufuji executed a Pole Shift on Liger to qualify for the quarter-final.

Results

No.	Results	Stipulations	Times
1	Tigers Mask defeated Taichi via submission	2009 Super J-Cup tournament first round	6:41
2	Ryusuke Taguchi defeated Gentaro	2009 Super J-Cup tournament first round	10:39
3	Yamato defeated Akira via submission	2009 Super J-Cup tournament first round	8:13
4	Danshoku Dino defeated Jado	2009 Super J-Cup tournament first round	10:14
5	Gedo defeated Kota Ibushi	2009 Super J-Cup tournament first round	14:15
6	Prince Devitt defeated Atsushi Aoki	2009 Super J-Cup tournament first round	10:51
7	Koji Kanemoto defeated Hayato Fujita via submission	2009 Super J-Cup tournament first round	13:45
8	Naomichi Marufuji defeated Jushin Thunder Liger	2009 Super J-Cup tournament first round	16:21

== December 23 ==
The second night of the Super J-Cup: 5th Stage was held on December 23, 2009 at Korakuen Hall in Tokyo, Japan, where the quarter-final, semi-final and final rounds of the Super J-Cup were determined. In the first match of the quarter-final round, Yamato was able to qualify for the semi-final by defeating Gedo via referee stoppage. The match was followed by Prince Devitt taking on Danshoku Dino, which Devitt won by hitting a diving double foot stomp on Dino. Ryusuke Taguchi defeated Koji Kanemoto by making him tap out to a heel hook. In the next match, Naomichi Marufuji defeated Tigers Mask by hitting an Australian Suplex.

Next was the semi-final round of the Super J-Cup, in which Prince Devitt defeated Yamato in the first match by executing a Reverse Bloody Sunday on Yamato. In the next semi-final, Naomichi Marufuji defeated Ryusuke Taguchi by hitting a Shiranui on Taguchi to qualify for the final round. The match was followed by a special eight-man tag team match, in which all the competitors participated, who were eliminated from the first round of the Super J-Cup, as a refresher for the finalists to take rest. The team of Jushin Thunder Liger, Akira, Kota Ibushi and Taichi defeated the team of Jado, Atsushi Aoki, Gentaro and Hayato Fujita when Akira pinned Jado with a La Magistral.

In the final round, Naomichi Marufuji defeated Prince Devitt by hitting a Pole Shift to win the 2009 Super J-Cup, thus winning his second consecutive Super J-Cup tournament and earned a title shot for the IWGP Junior Heavyweight Championship at Wrestle Kingdom IV in Tokyo Dome.

Results

No.	Results	Stipulations	Times
1	Yamato defeated Gedo via referee stoppage	2009 Super J-Cup tournament quarter-final	8:36
2	Prince Devitt defeated Danshoku Dino	2009 Super J-Cup tournament quarter-final	5:49
3	Ryusuke Taguchi defeated Koji Kanemoto via submission	2009 Super J-Cup tournament quarter-final	10:14
4	Naomichi Marufuji defeated Tigers Mask	2009 Super J-Cup tournament quarter-final	6:36
5	Prince Devitt defeated Yamato	2009 Super J-Cup tournament semi-final	8:41
6	Naomichi Marufuji defeated Ryusuke Taguchi	2009 Super J-Cup tournament semi-final	10:57
7	Jushin Thunder Liger, Akira, Kota Ibushi and Taichi defeated Jado, Atsushi Aoki, Gentaro and Hayato Fujita	Eight-man tag team match	17:41
8	Naomichi Marufuji defeated Prince Devitt	2009 Super J-Cup tournament final	18:06

== Aftermath ==
Due to winning the 2009 Super J-Cup, Naomichi Marufuji received a title shot at the IWGP Junior Heavyweight Championship against Tiger Mask at Wrestle Kingdom IV in Tokyo Dome on January 4, 2010, where he defeated Tiger Mask to capture the Junior Heavyweight Championship. The tournament would then be revived by NJPW after a seven-year hiatus in 2016.

== Tournament brackets ==
Round 1
Prince Devitt	Pin
Atsushi Aoki	10:51
Jado	Pin
Danshoku Dino	10:14
Gedo	Pin
Kota Ibushi	14:15
Akira	Sub
Yamato	8:13
Jushin Thunder Liger	Pin
Naomichi Marufuji	16:21
Taichi	Sub
Tigers Mask	6:41
Koji Kanemoto	Sub
Hayato Fujita	13:45
Ryusuke Taguchi	Pin
Gentaro	10:39

Round 2
Prince Devitt	Pin
Danshoku Dino	5:49
Gedo	Stp
Yamato	8:36
Naomichi Marufuji	Pin
Tigers Mask	6:36
Koji Kanemoto	Sub
Ryusuke Taguchi	10:14

Semifinals
Prince Devitt	Pin
Yamato	8:41
Naomichi Marufuji	Pin
Ryusuke Taguchi	10:57

Final
Prince Devitt	Pin
Naomichi Marufuji	18:06
