= Super J-Cup (2016) =

Professional wrestling

Super J-Cup: 6th Stage
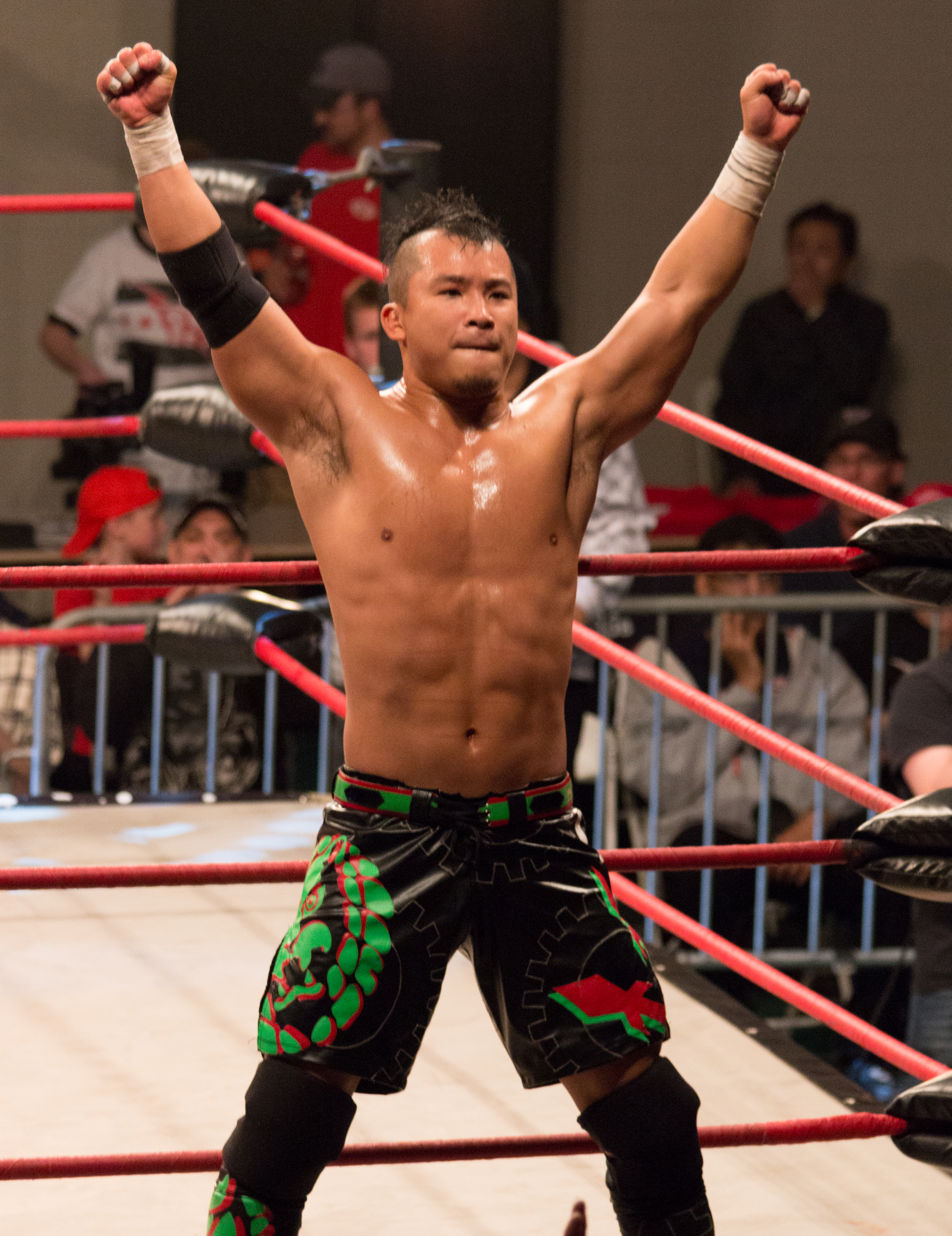
- Tournament winner Kushida
- Venue: Korakuen Hall; Ariake Coliseum
- Location: Tokyo, Japan
- Start date: July 20, 2016
- End date: August 21, 2016

Champion
- Kushida

Super J-Cup: 6th Stage was the sixth Super J-Cup professional wrestling single-elimination tournament produced by New Japan Pro-Wrestling (NJPW). It was a two-night event, taking place on July 20, 2016 and August 21, 2016. The first round held on July 20 took place at the Korakuen Hall in Tokyo, Japan, while the next three rounds took place on August 21 at the Ariake Coliseum in Tokyo, Japan. The tournament featured interpromotional matches between junior heavyweight wrestlers from various Japanese promotions as well as North American promotions. Kushida defeated Yoshinobu Kanemaru in the final round on August 20 to win the 2016 Super J-Cup tournament.

== Background ==
After a seven-year break, NJPW announced on March 3, 2016, that the Super J-Cup would return on August 21. The tournament was later expanded with an additional show on July 20, which featured all eight first round matches. The four second round matches, two semifinal matches and the final all took place on August 21.

== Qualifying matches ==
=== Kaientai Dojo ===
Kaientai Dojo held first two qualifying matches at the Club K-3000 event on June 11, 2016 at the Blue Field in Chiba, Chiba, Japan. The winners of the two matches advanced to participate in the qualifying tournament for the Super J-Cup on June 19.

Club K-3000 – June 11, 2016 (Chiba Blue Field – Chiba, Chiba, Japan)

No.	Results	Stipulations	Times
1	Kyu Mogami defeated Yuma	2016 Super J-Cup Qualification Tournament qualifying match	8:35
2	Ayumu Honda defeated Go Asakawa via submission	2016 Super J-Cup Qualification Tournament qualifying match	10:51

Kaientai Dojo Super J-Cup 2016 Qualifying One Day Tournament – June 19, 2016 (Chiba Blue Field – Chiba, Chiba, Japan)

No.	Results	Stipulations	Times
1	Ayato Yoshida defeated Ayumu Honda	Kaientai Dojo 2016 Super J-Cup qualifying tournament quarter-final	9:59
2	Daigoro Kashiwa defeated Ricky Fuji	Kaientai Dojo 2016 Super J-Cup qualifying tournament quarter-final	8:29
3	Kaji Tomato defeated Kunio Toshima	Kaientai Dojo 2016 Super J-Cup qualifying tournament quarter-final	5:26
4	Shiori Asahi defeated Kyu Mogami	Kaientai Dojo 2016 Super J-Cup qualifying tournament quarter-final	9:27
5	Ayato Yoshida defeated Daigoro Kashiwa	Kaientai Dojo 2016 Super J-Cup qualifying tournament semi-final	0:27
6	Kaji Tomato defeated Shiori Asahi	Kaientai Dojo 2016 Super J-Cup qualifying tournament semi-final	13:04
7	Kaji Tomato defeated Ayato Yoshida	Kaientai Dojo 2016 Super J-Cup qualifying tournament final	13:43

Tournament brackets

Round 1
6/11	Ayumu Honda	Sub
Go Asakawa	10:51
6/11	Kyu Mogami	Pin
Yuma	8:35

Quarterfinals
6/19	Ayato Yoshida	Sub
Ayumu Honda	9:59
6/19	Daigoro Kashiwa	Pin
Ricky Fuji	8:29
6/19	Kaji Tomato	Pin
Kunio Toshima	5:26
6/19	Shiori Asahi	Pin
Kyu Mogami	9:27

Semifinals
6/19	Ayato Yoshida	Pin
Daigoro Kashiwa	0:27
6/19	Kaji Tomato	Pin
Shiori Asahi	13:04

Final
6/19	Ayato Yoshida	Pin
Kaji Tomato	13:43

=== Pro Wrestling Noah ===
Pro Wrestling Noah held a qualification tournament with three finalists qualifying for the Super J-Cup. Two of the first round matches took place on June 16, 2016 and the next four matches of the first round took place on July 3 and three second round matches took place on July 5 and the winners of the second round matches qualified to represent Noah in the tournament.

June 16, 2016 – (Shinjuku Face – Tokyo, Japan)

No.	Results	Stipulations	Times
1	Yoshinari Ogawa defeated Hitoshi Kumano	Pro Wrestling Noah 2016 Super J-Cup qualifying tournament first round	10:30
2	Taiji Ishimori defeated Kaito Kiyomiya	Pro Wrestling Noah 2016 Super J-Cup qualifying tournament first round	9:32

July 3, 2016 – (Shibata, Niigata, Japan)

No.	Results	Stipulations	Times
1	Daisuke Harada defeated Shiro Tomoyose	Pro Wrestling Noah 2016 Super J-Cup qualifying tournament first round	8:23
2	Hajime Ohara defeated Andy Dalton	Pro Wrestling Noah 2016 Super J-Cup qualifying tournament first round	8:38
3	Genba Hirayanagi defeated Captain Noah	Pro Wrestling Noah 2016 Super J-Cup qualifying tournament first round	13:05
4	Kenou defeated Atsushi Kotoge	Pro Wrestling Noah 2016 Super J-Cup qualifying tournament first round	12:24

July 5, 2016 – (Korakuen Hall – Tokyo, Japan)

No.	Results	Stipulations	Times
1	Taiji Ishimori defeated Yoshinari Ogawa	Pro Wrestling Noah 2016 Super J-Cup qualifying tournament second round	10:30
2	Kenou defeated Genba Hirayanagi	Pro Wrestling Noah 2016 Super J-Cup qualifying tournament second round	7:59
3	Daisuke Harada defeated Hajime Ohara	Pro Wrestling Noah 2016 Super J-Cup qualifying tournament second round	13:48

=== Suzuki-gun ===
Suzuki-gun held a round-robin tournament, in which four of its members competed in matches of various stipulations to qualify for the tournament. Yoshinobu Kanemaru and Taichi qualified by scoring four points each.

Taka & Taichi Produce in Shin-Kiba – Suzuki-gun SUPER J-CUP 2016 Qualifiers – June 24, 2016 (Shin-Kiba, Tokyo, Japan)

No.	Results	Stipulations	Times
1	Taichi defeated Yoshinobu Kanemaru via count-out	Count-out rules match	8:10
2	Taka Michinoku defeated El Desperado	Bodyslam Challenge match	6:02
3	El Desperado defeated Taichi	Ladder match	11:38
4	Yoshinobu Kanemaru defeated Taka Michinoku	Singles match	6:44
5	Yoshinobu Kanemaru defeated El Desperado	Chairs match	10:52
6	Taichi defeated Taka Michinoku	Two-count rules match^{1}	6:09

^{1}In this match, the referee counted to two instead of a three-count.

== Participants ==
It was announced that the tournament would feature participants from promotions around the world; four from NJPW (with one spot designated to the Chaos stable), one from All Japan Pro Wrestling (AJPW), three from Pro Wrestling Noah, one from Consejo Mundial de Lucha Libre (CMLL), Dragon Gate, Kaientai Dojo (K-Dojo), Ring of Honor (ROH), and Ryukyu Dragon Pro Wrestling each, two from the Suzuki-gun stable and one surprise entrant. Originally it was also announced that Pro Wrestling Zero1 would be represented in the tournament, but they were replaced with AJPW. K-Dojo, Noah and Suzuki-gun announced their own qualifying tournaments to determine their representatives in the tournament. The full list of participants was revealed on July 6 with the surprise entrant spot filled by Bushi, representing the NJPW stable Los Ingobernables de Japón.

Name	Promotion	Group
Bushi	New Japan Pro-Wrestling	Los Ingobernables de Japón
Daisuke Harada	Pro Wrestling Noah	
Eita	Dragon Gate	
Gurukun Mask	Ryukyu Dragon Pro Wrestling	
Jushin Thunder Liger	New Japan Pro-Wrestling	
Kaji Tomato	Kaientai Dojo	
Kenoh	Pro Wrestling Noah	
Kushida	New Japan Pro-Wrestling	
Matt Sydal	Ring of Honor	
Ryusuke Taguchi	New Japan Pro-Wrestling	
Taichi	Pro Wrestling Noah	Suzuki-gun
Taiji Ishimori	Pro Wrestling Noah	
Titán	Consejo Mundial de Lucha Libre	
Will Ospreay	New Japan Pro-Wrestling	Chaos
Yoshinobu Kanemaru	Pro Wrestling Noah	Suzuki-gun
Yuma Aoyagi	All Japan Pro Wrestling	

== Tournament ==
=== July 20 ===
Super J-Cup: 6th Stage (Day 1)
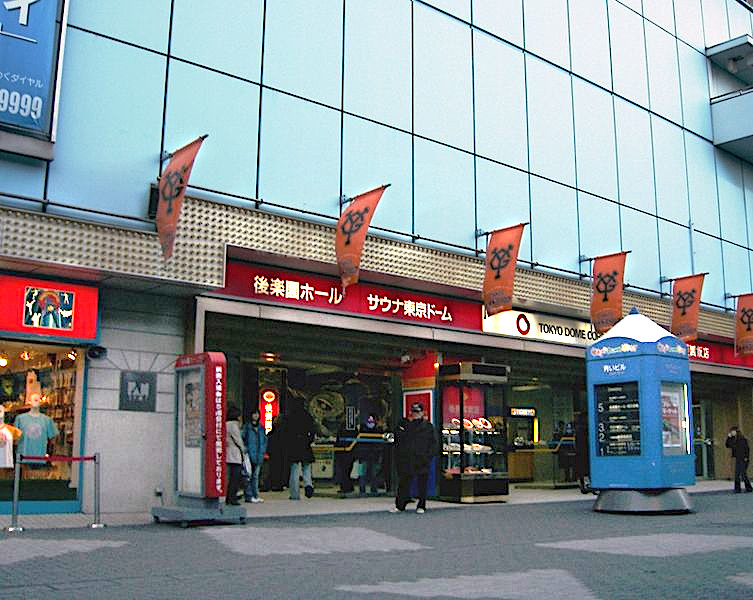
- Korakuen Hall
- Promotion: New Japan Pro-Wrestling
- Date: July 20, 2016
- City: Tokyo, Japan
- Venue: Korakuen Hall
- Attendance: 1,606

Super J-Cup chronology
← Previous; Super J-Cup: 5th Stage	Next → Super J-Cup: 6th Stage (Day 2)

The first round of the Super J-Cup: 6th Stage was held at the Korakuen Hall in Tokyo, Japan on July 20, 2016. In the opening match of the tournament, Ring of Honor representative Matt Sydal took on Kaientai Dojo's representative Koji Tomato, who won a qualification tournament in Kaientai Dojo to qualify for the tournament as Kaientai Dojo representative. Tomato showed some quick offense during the match and gained control until Sydal made a comeback by kicking Tomato in the head while Tomato had applied an abdominal stretch but Tomato countered it into a small package for a near-fall. Sydal hit a corner clothesline to Tomato followed by a diving double knee drop and then executed a Shooting Sydal Press on Tomato to win the match.

Next, Pro Wrestling Noah's first representative Kenoh took on Ryukyu Dragon Pro Wrestling representative Gurukun Mask. Near the end of the match, Mask hit a lariat to gain a near-fall on Kenou. Mask executed an elevated front powerslam to Kenoh and a diving moonsault for a near-fall. Kenoh recovered to receive a kick from Mask, who then attempted a Diver Suplex but Kenoh countered it with a backflip kick followed by a dragon suplex and a Kebou for a near-fall. Kenoh then finished Mask with a Ragou.

Suzuki-gun's first representative Taichi squared off against All Japan Pro Wrestling's sole representative Yuma Aoyagi in the third match. El Desperado constantly interfered on Taichi's behalf during the earlier portion of the match as he distracted the referee, allowing Taichi to hit Aoyagi with a bull hammer and gain momentum in the match. After controlling most of the match, Taichi attempted a Taichi-shiki Liger Bomb but Aoyagi countered it and got a few near-falls on Taichi until he kicked Aoyagi in the head and then hit him with a jumping high kick, followed by a superkick and a Taichi-shiki Last Ride for the victory.

Two-time tournament winner Jushin Thunder Liger competed in the following match against Dragon Gate's Eita. Eita attacked Liger before the match by dropkicking him during his entrance to the ring and hit a suicide dive to Liger outside the ring. Eita further weakened Liger by throwing him into the ringpost and then tossed him into the ring to begin the match. Liger hit a tilt-a-whirl backbreaker on a charging Eita and then executed a brainbuster outside the ring. Eita eventually returned to the ring and gained momentum on Liger. Near the end of the match, Eita applied a Numero Uno to Liger's injured arm until Liger reached the ropes and hit a Shotei. Liger then charged Eita in the corner and Eita got him in another Numero Uno until Liger reached the ropes and hit a Thesz press and another Shotei and a brainbuster to win the match.

The match was followed by Chaos member Will Ospreay competing against Titán. Titán applied a figure four leglock on Ospreay until Ospreay reversed it but reached the ropes, forcing the hold to be broken. Titán attempted to dive on Ospreay but Ospreay avoided the move and Titán hit the corner where Ospreay hit a Cheeky Nandos Kick and then Titán rolled outside the ring where Ospreay hit a Sasuke Special. The action returned to the ring where Ospreay hit a Pip Pip Cheerio followed by a shooting star press and a corkscrew 450° splash, a diving spinning heel kick and then hit an OsCutter for the victory.

Suzuki-gun's second representative in the tournament Yoshinobu Kanemaru took on Los Ingobernables de Japón member Bushi. Bushi dropkicked Kanemaru before the match began and then dived onto him but Kanemaru hit him with a chair shot. Kanemaru knocked out Bushi with a Brainbuster and then hit a Deep Impact to gain a near-fall. Bushi reversed Kanemaru's suplex attempt into a backslide until he attacked the referee and attempted to spit mist into Kanemaru but Kanemaru avoided it and kicked him in the groin and then hit a Touch Out to get the win.

Later, Daisuke Harada took on Ryusuke Taguchi. After a back and forth action, Taguchi avoided a German suplex and rolled it to apply an ankle lock until Harada countered it to apply the ankle lock. Taguchi rolled again for another ankle lock before leaving it and then hit a Dodon, followed by a Dodon's Throne for the win.

The last first round match of the tournament featured Taiji Ishimori against Kushida in the main event of the show. Ishimori dropped Kushida onto the top turnbuckle but Kushida applied a Hoverboard Lock until Ishimori hit a headbutt to get out of the move and Ishimori followed with a moonsault slam. Ishimori attempted a 450° splash on Kushida but Kushida raised his knees to block the move. Kushida then attempted a Hoverboard Lock twice on Ishimori but Ishimori blocked both attempts. Kushida eventually hit a backflip kick and applied a Hoverboard Lock to defeat Ishimori by submission.

=== August 21 ===
Super J-Cup: 6th Stage (Day 2)
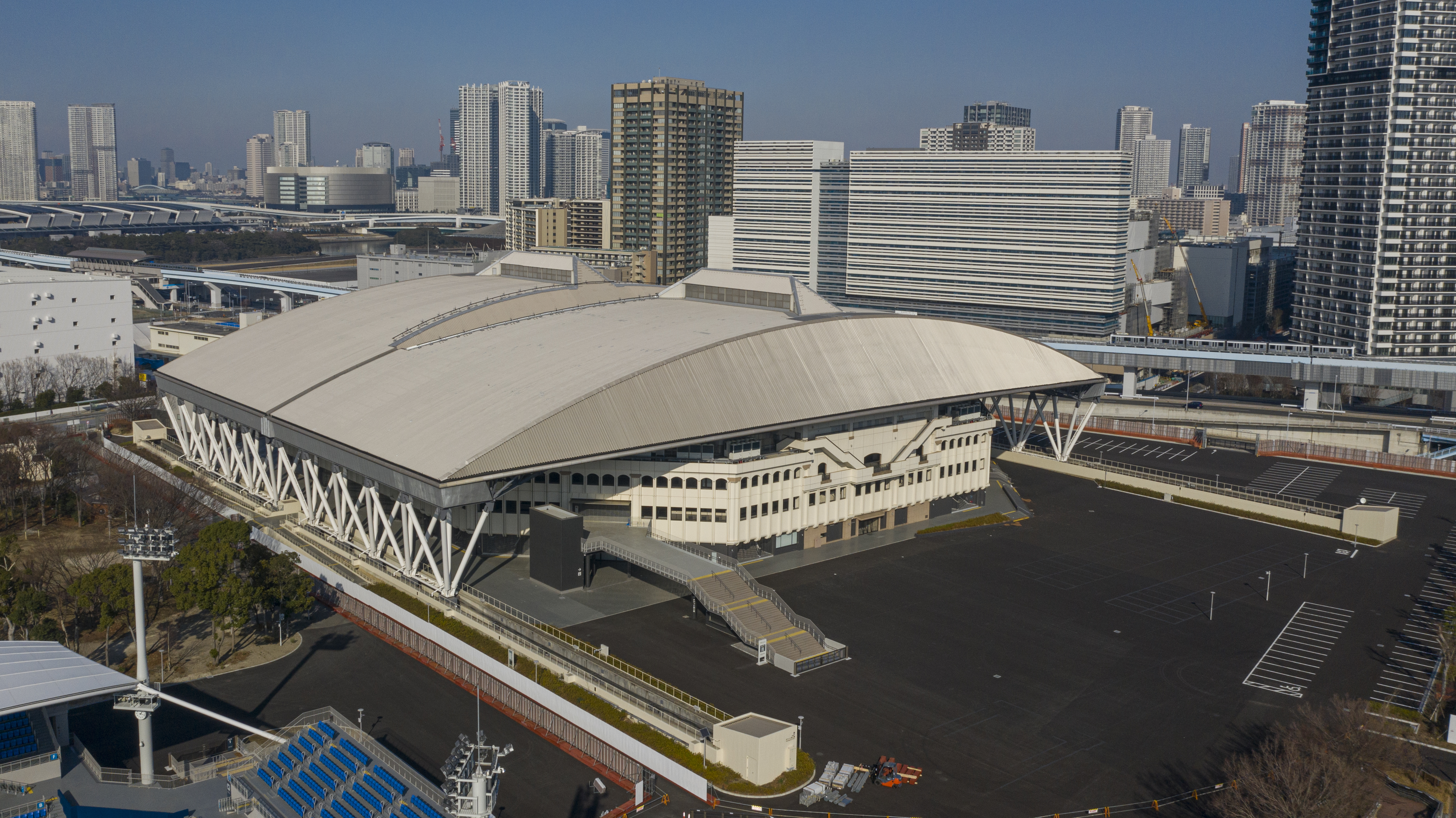
- Ariake Coliseum
- Promotion: New Japan Pro-Wrestling
- Date: August 21, 2016
- City: Tokyo, Japan
- Venue: Ariake Coliseum
- Attendance: 3,041

Super J-Cup chronology
← Previous; Super J-Cup: 6th Stage (Day 1)	Next → —

The quarter-final, semi-final and final rounds of the Super J-Cup: 6th Stage took place at the Ariake Coliseum in Tokyo, Japan on August 21, 2016.

==== Quarterfinals ====
The show kicked off with a non-tournament six-man tag team match, in which the team of Eita, Yuma Aoyagi and David Finlay took on Gurukun Mask, Koji Tomato and Bushi, with five of them being eliminated from the Super J-Cup in the first round. After a back and forth match, Bushi hit a MX to Finlay for the win. After the match, Bushi attacked his partners as Tomato gifted tomatoes to his tag team partners but Bushi ripped off Gurukun Mask's mask and spit mist on Tomato.

The tag team match was followed by the quarter-final round of the Super J-Cup. In the first match of the tournament, Jushin Thunder Liger competed against Taichi. Before the match started, Taichi distracted the referee by hugging him allowing El Desperado to attack Liger from behind and Taichi began attacking Liger to begin the match. After a back and forth action, Taichi won the match by slipping into the ring while Desperado held Liger, preventing him from making it to the ring. As a result, Taichi won by count-out.

It was followed by Kushida taking on Kenoh. Kushida began working on Kenoh's arm as the match kicked off and then applied a Hoverboard Lock. Kenoh made a comeback with a series of kicks including a penalty kick until Kushida gained control of Kenoh by making him submit to a cross armbreaker.

The third match of the quarter-final round was next as Ryusuke Taguchi took on Yoshinobu Kanemaru. Kanemaru gained control after planting Taguchi with a DDT on the floor outside the ring. After trading moves, Taguchi attempted a Dodon but Kanemaru countered with a DDT until Taguchi made a comeback and hit a Dodon for a near-fall. Kanemaru hit a low blow behind the referee's back and hit an inverted DDT and a Deep Impact followed by a Touch Out for the victory.

In the last match of the quarter-final, Matt Sydal competed against Will Ospreay. After countering each other's moves, Ospreay got the momentum by hitting a Pip Pip Cheerio to send Sydal outside the ring followed by a Sasuke Special outside the ring. The action returned to the ring where Ospreay hit a Cheeky Nandos Kick and attempted a Rainham Maker but Sydal countered it with a Slice. Sydal attempted to pin but Ospreay attempted to counter it with a Powerbomb but Sydal countered it into a Hurricanrana for a near-fall. Ospreay hit high-flying moves on Sydal until Sydal hit a Frankensteiner, followed by an Air Sydal to get the victory.

The match was followed by a lucha libre six-man tag team match featuring wrestlers from Consejo Mundial de Lucha Libre. The team of Titán, Caristico and Volador Jr. took on Gran Guerrero, Euforia and Ultimo Guerrero. After a back and forth action, Volador hit a Spanish Fly to Gran Guerrero to pick up the victory for his team.

==== Semifinals ====
In the first semi-final match, Kushida took on Taichi. Taichi attacked Kushida before the match and gained the assistance of Ofune and El Desperado to gain advantage over Kushida. After bearing offense by Taichi, Kushida ultimately applied a Hoverboard Lock by countering an attempt of a Taichi-shiki Last Ride by Taichi and Taichi tapped out the hold but Desperado distracted the referee and the referee was unable to see the submission and then Taichi hit Kushida with a steel chair. Taichi executed a Taichi-shiki Last Ride on Kushida to get a near-fall and then attempted a Tensho Jujihou but Kushida ducked it and pinned him with a small package to advance to the final round. After the match, Suzuki-gun attacked Kushida.

In the next semi-final, Matt Sydal competed against Yoshinobu Kanemaru. Sydal used quick strikes and aerial moves to keep momentum until Kanemaru blocked an Air Sydal attempt by raising his knees but Sydal managed to hit a diving knee drop to Kanemaru. He then attempted a Frankensteiner in the corner but Kanemaru countered with a Deep Impact followed by a lariat and a Touch Out to advance to the final.

The match was followed by the first title match of the event as Pro Wrestling Noah's Atsushi Kotoge and Daisuke Harada defended the GHC Junior Heavyweight Tag Team Championship against A. C. H. and Taiji Ishimori. After a back and forth action between the two teams, Harada executed a Katayama German Suplex Hold on Ishimori to retain the tag titles.

Next was the penultimate match of the event, in which The Young Bucks (Matt and Nick) defended the IWGP Junior Heavyweight Tag Team Championship against The Motor City Machine Guns (Alex Shelley and Chris Sabin). Bucks knocked out Shelley with an Indytaker outside the ring, allowing Sabin to fend off himself alone. Bucks then hit a Meltzer Driver to Sabin in the ring to retain the titles.

==== Final ====
Kushida took on Yoshinobu Kanemaru in the final round of the 2016 Super J-Cup tournament. Suzuki-gun interfered in the match on Kanemaru's behalf until NJPW wrestlers intervened and a brawl ensued between NJPW wrestlers and Suzuki-gun members. Taichi hit a Black Mephisto to Kushida, allowing Kanemaru to gain momentum and hit a Deep Impact but still got a near-fall. He delivered another Deep Impact for another near-fall. Kanemaru attempted to hit a Touch Out but Kushida blocked it twice and applied a Hoverboard Lock, making Kanemaru tap out to the hold. After the match, Kushida's former tag team partner Alex Shelley helped him in wearing his golden robe and awarded him with the Super J-Cup trophy.

== Reception ==
Super J-Cup: 6th Stage received mixed reviews from the critics. The tournament was appreciated match-wise and performance-wise but most of the critics panned the event due to its NJPW-favorite booking and much outside interference in several matches instead of competitive matches.

TJ Hawke of 411Mania called the August 21 show "a rather sluggish show", rating it 5, with "The big tag matches did not deliver, and Taichi's involvement really dragged down the actual tournament. However, a handful of matches were quite pleasant, and those ***+ (three star plus) matches are worth checking out."

Kevin Pantoja of 411Mania rated the first round of the tournament a score of 6.5 and considered it "a bit of a disappointment" in comparison to the previous Super J-Cup tournaments and criticized the booking of the tournament including the elimination of Bushi and Daisuke Harada from the first round and dominance of NJPW wrestlers in the first round. He rated the final show 5 and called it "not so good", citing "This show was long and it felt even longer. The tournament matches ranged from shitty to pretty good and nothing stood out. The multi-man tags were both pretty good, while the two Jr. Tag Title matches were split. The Bucks/MCMG was more of the same, but the NOAH one ruled and was the match of the night. The Super J-Cup was not only strangely booked but it was a severe disappointment and was extremely underwhelming."

Case Lowe of Voices of Wrestling stated that the first round "wasn’t a Show of the Year Contender and there was at least one match with groan-inducing booking, that being Eita vs. Liger, but this show blew by and delivered two great matches. It delivered as much as it should have." His reviews on the August 21 show were even worse by stating "There’s no reason to sit through this entire show unless you’re a completist. Kenoh vs. KUSHIDA was fun, but Ospreay vs. Sydal and the two junior tag matches qualifies as the essential viewing for this show. I am an outlier on the lucha tag, so if that style floats your boat, give that a look also. Thumbs in the middle for this show. I’m glad KUSHIDA won and I think that’s the right decision, but Suzuki-Gun was such a key part of this show and it was so terribly frustrating."

Ian Hamilton of BackBodyDrop considered the first round of the Super J-Cup: 6th Stage, "a fantastic first round of tournament action."

Sean Radican of Pro Wrestling Torch gave the first round, a rating of 7.5. He appreciated the event but criticized the booking as the majority of NJPW wrestlers advanced to the quarter-final of the tournament, citing "this show featured a ton of great action" with "a lot of fun seeing talent I don’t normally get to see. Titan, Harada, and Ishimori were all impressive on this show."

Ioan Morris of Blog of Doom wrote on the first round "an easy show to recommend, but I can’t help but feel they’ve wasted some of the better matches already. I would’ve preferred to see BUSHI, Ishimori and Eita go further, although I can understand why they didn’t. Still, this was an enjoyable two-and-a-half hours of wrestling, and if you have the time you should check it out." He then opined about the next three rounds "Fittingly, the final was the best match, and the tag title matches were good too, but this was too long and the crowd were quiet for most of it (although apparently that was due to the venue). As a whole, this fell flat for me, particularly after such an excellent G1 tournament." He further added "Either way, the Super J-Cup still has name value and this didn’t do it justice. To end on a positive, Kushida was as consistently good as we’ve come to expect, and was the right choice to win this."

== Results ==
Night 1 (July 20)
No.	Results	Stipulations	Times
1	Matt Sydal defeated Kaji Tomato	2016 Super J-Cup tournament first round	7:56
2	Kenoh defeated Gurukun Mask	2016 Super J-Cup tournament first round	11:33
3	Taichi defeated Yuma Aoyagi	2016 Super J-Cup tournament first round	12:05
4	Jushin Thunder Liger defeated Eita	2016 Super J-Cup tournament first round	9:12
5	Will Ospreay defeated Titán	2016 Super J-Cup tournament first round	9:14
6	Yoshinobu Kanemaru defeated Bushi	2016 Super J-Cup tournament first round	10:25
7	Ryusuke Taguchi defeated Daisuke Harada	2016 Super J-Cup tournament first round	14:56
8	Kushida defeated Taiji Ishimori	2016 Super J-Cup tournament first round	16:25

Night 2 (August 21)
No.	Results	Stipulations	Times
1	Bushi, Kaji Tomato and Gurukun Mask defeated Eita, Yuma Aoyagi and David Finlay	Six-man tag team match	7:56
2	Taichi defeated Jushin Thunder Liger via count-out	2016 Super J-Cup tournament quarter-final round	3:01
3	Kushida defeated Kenoh via submission	2016 Super J-Cup tournament quarter-final round	10:24
4	Yoshinobu Kanemaru defeated Ryusuke Taguchi	2016 Super J-Cup tournament quarter-final round	9:27
5	Matt Sydal defeated Will Ospreay	2016 Super J-Cup tournament quarter-final round	12:45
6	Volador Jr., Titán and Caristico defeated Ultimo Guerrero, Euforia and Gran Guerrero	Six-man tag team match	15:21
7	Kushida defeated Taichi	2016 Super J-Cup tournament semi-final round	9:52
8	Yoshinobu Kanemaru defeated Matt Sydal	2016 Super J-Cup tournament semi-final round	9:52
9	Daisuke Harada and Atsushi Kotoge (c) defeated Taiji Ishimori and A. C. H.	Tag team match for the GHC Junior Heavyweight Tag Team Championship	12:27
10	The Young Bucks (Matt Jackson and Nick Jackson) (c) defeated The Motor City Machine Guns (Alex Shelley and Chris Sabin)	Tag team match for the IWGP Junior Heavyweight Tag Team Championship	15:56
11	Kushida defeated Yoshinobu Kanemaru via submission	2016 Super J-Cup tournament final	19:50
(c) / – the champion(s) heading into the match

=== Tournament brackets ===
Round 1
Jushin Thunder Liger	Pin
Eita	9:12
Yuma Aoyagi	Pin
Taichi	12:05
Kushida	Sub
Taiji Ishimori	16:25
Gurukun Mask	Pin
Kenoh	11:33
Ryusuke Taguchi	Pin
Daisuke Harada	14:56
Bushi	Pin
Yoshinobu Kanemaru	10:25
Titán	Pin
Will Ospreay	9:14
Matt Sydal	Pin
Kaji Tomato	7:56

Round 2
Jushin Thunder Liger	Countout
Taichi	3:01
Kushida	Pin
Kenoh	10:24
Ryusuke Taguchi	Pin
Yoshinobu Kanemaru	9:27
Will Ospreay	Pin
Matt Sydal	12:45

Semifinals
Taichi	Pin
Kushida	9:52
Yoshinobu Kanemaru	Pin
Matt Sydal	9:00

Final
Kushida	Sub
Yoshinobu Kanemaru	19:50
