= Cody Hall =

American professional wrestler (born 1991)

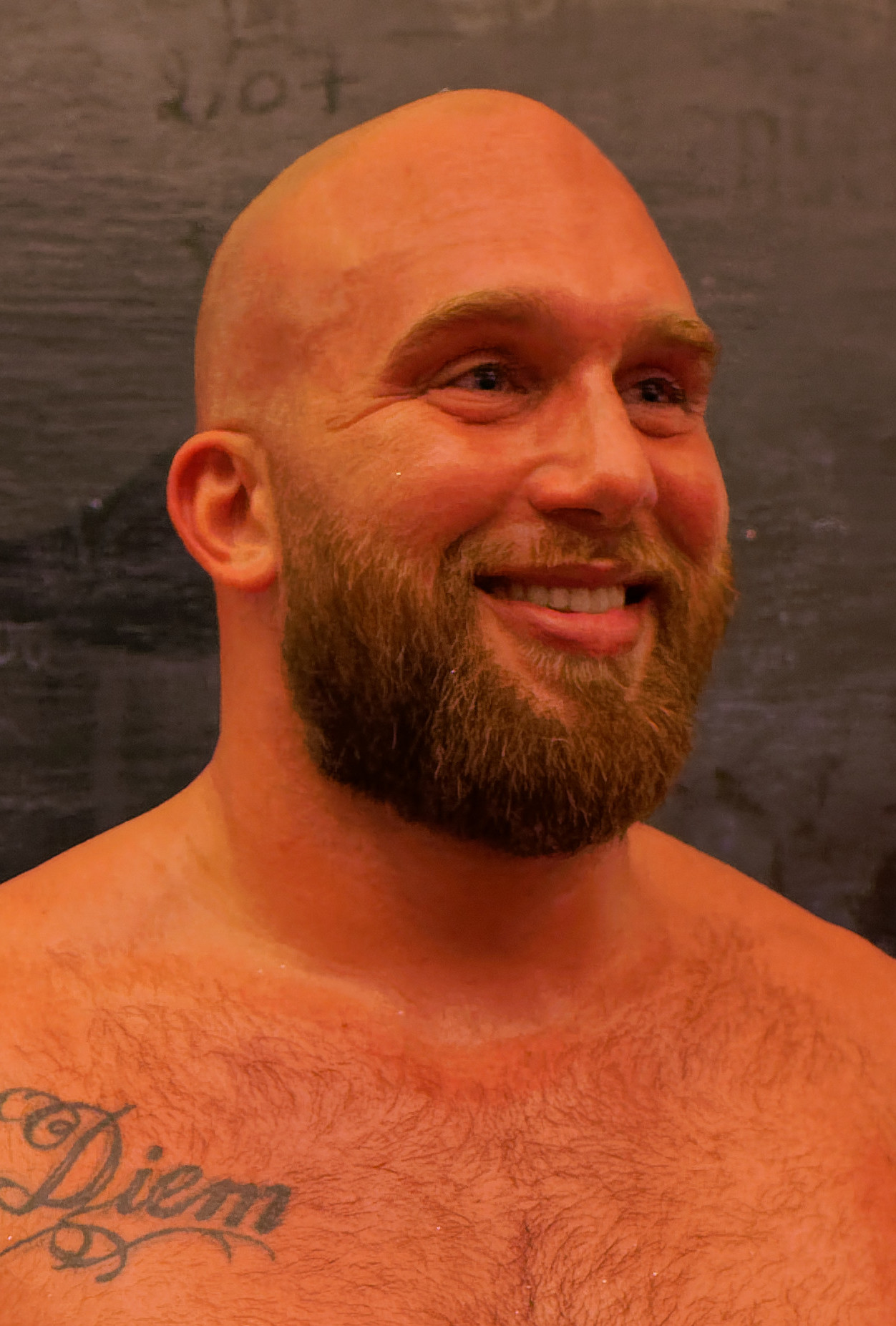
- Hall in 2019

Personal information
- Born: Cody Taylor Hall; May 31, 1991 (age 35) Chuluota, Florida, U.S.
- Parent: Scott Hall (father)

Professional wrestling career
- Ring name(s): Cody Hall; Psycho Clown
- Billed height: 6 ft 10 in (208 cm)
- Billed weight: 268 lb (122 kg)
- Billed from: Chuluota, Florida
- Trained by: Scott Hall
- Debut: July 14, 2012
- Retired: 2020
- Military service
- Allegiance: United States
- Branch: United States Air Force
- Unit: 460th Security Forces Squadron

Cody Taylor Hall (born May 31, 1991) is an American retired professional wrestler. He is best known for working for New Japan Pro-Wrestling (NJPW), where he was a former member of the Bullet Club stable. Hall is a second generation wrestler, as the son of Scott Hall.

== Early life ==
Hall was born to Scott Hall and Dana Lee Burgio in 1991 and has a sister, Cassidy. He considers fellow professional wrestlers Kevin Nash and Sean Waltman as uncles due to them being close friends of his father.

Hall was a member of the United States Air Force and served an active duty service commitment with the 460th Security Forces Squadron at Buckley Air Force Base in Colorado. Hall departed to become a professional wrestler.

== Professional wrestling career ==
=== Early career (2012–2014) ===
Hall began to train as a professional wrestler in 2010 with his father, as he wanted to follow in his footsteps. Hall's first match took place on July 14, 2012, in Belleview Pro Wrestling, defeating Josh Hess. In the following years, Hall worked in various promotions, usually in tag matches with Kevin Nash or Sean Waltman, both Scott Hall's friends. On November 15, 2014, at Superstars of Wrestling 2, Hall won the Superstars of Wrestling Championship after defeating Tim Zbyszko in a ladder match. In 2014, Hall won the Georgia Heavyweight Championship from Southern Fried Championship Wrestling.

=== New Japan Pro-Wrestling (2015–2017) ===
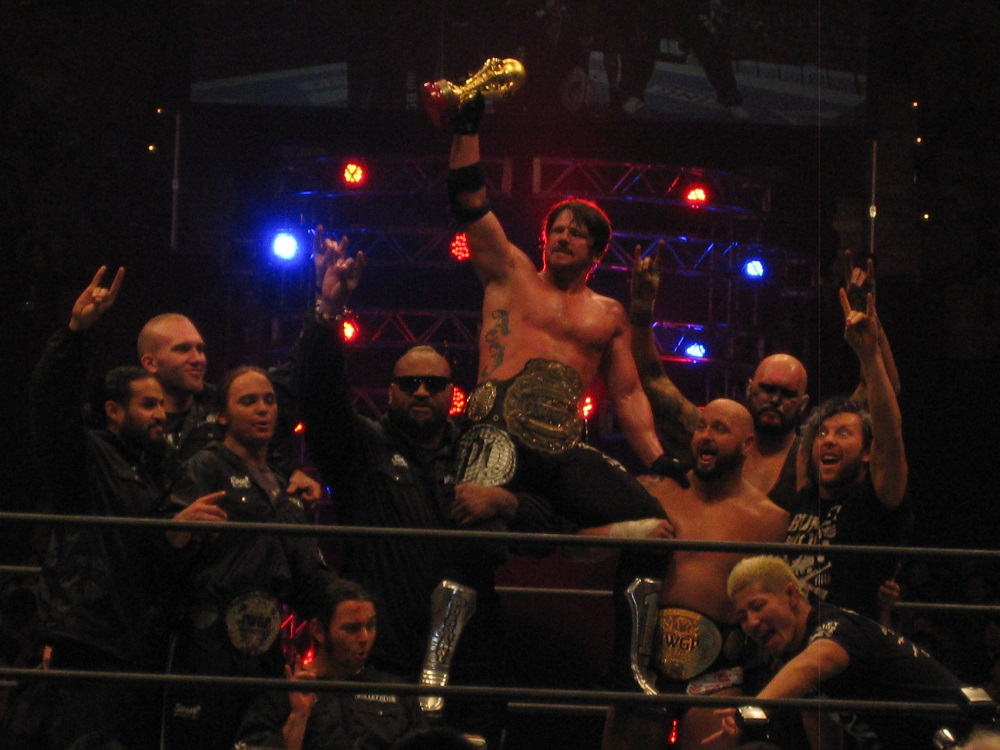
Hall as a member of Bullet Club in February 2015

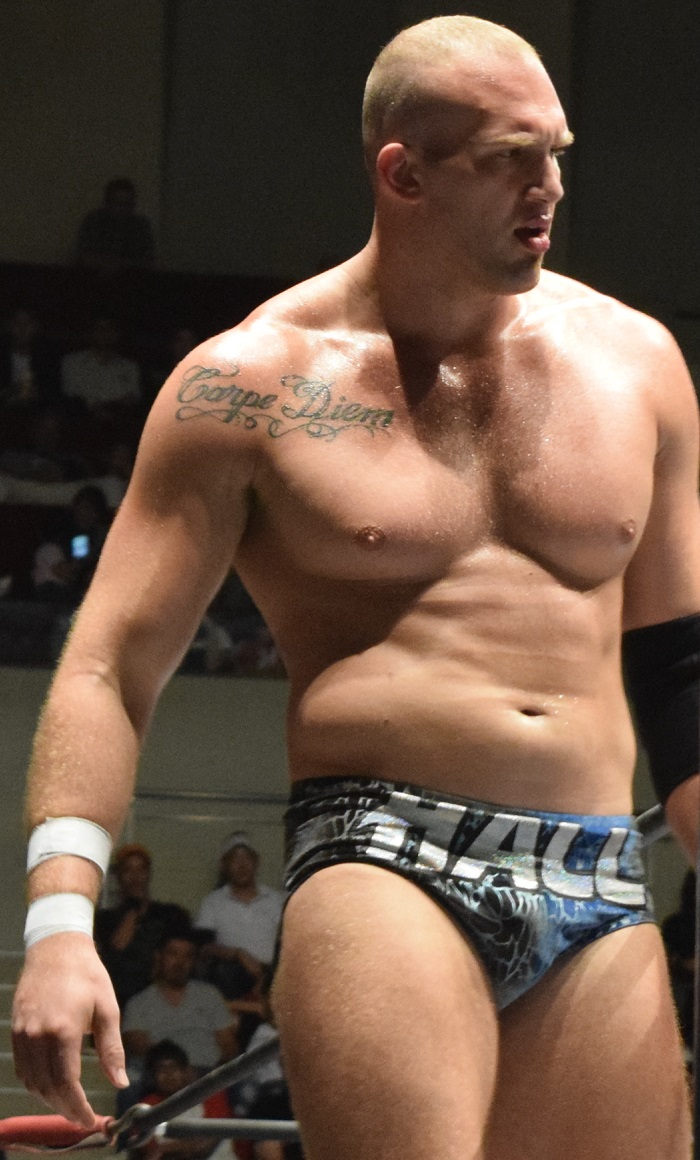
Hall working in NJPW in 2015

In January 2015, Hall began training at the New Japan Pro-Wrestling dojo. On January 5 at New Year Dash!!, Hall debuted as Bullet Club's personal "young boy" trainee. Hall made his NJPW in-ring debut on February 2, teaming with his stablemates Doc Gallows, Karl Anderson, Kenny Omega and Yujiro Takahashi in a ten-man tag team main event, where they were defeated by Captain New Japan, Hirooki Goto, Katsuyori Shibata, Ryusuke Taguchi and Hiroshi Tanahashi, who pinned him for the win. As is usually the case with "young boys" in Japan, Hall would lose many of his first matches with NJPW, and often be pinned in multi-man tag matches, but achieved his first victory on April 29 at Wrestling Hinokuni in a tag team match, where he and Yujiro Takahashi defeated Captain New Japan and Satoshi Kojima. Hall, however, was not involved in the finish of the match. Over the next year, Hall mainly worked tag team matches with his Bullet Club stablemates, while also becoming an enforcer for The Young Bucks (Matt Jackson and Nick Jackson). Hall scored his first win himself on April 2, 2016, when he submitted rookie Hirai Kawato in a singles match. Hall was injured later that month at Invasion Attack 2016, and remained sidelined until January 2017, when his profile was quietly removed from NJPW's roster page, signaling his departure from the promotion.

=== Pro Wrestling Noah (2017–2019) ===
On March 13, 2017, the Japanese Pro Wrestling Noah promotion announced that Hall would start working regularly for the promotion on April 11. The following month, Hall teamed with Randy Reign in the 2017 Global Tag League, finishing with a record of four wins and three losses, failing to advance to the finals. During the tournament, Hall and Reign defeated eventual tournament winners and reigning GHC Tag Team Champions Maybach Taniguchi and Naomichi Marufuji, making them the number one contenders to Taniguchi and Marufuji. Hall and Reign received their title shot on June 4, but were defeated by Taniguchi and Marufuji. On October 1, Hall unsuccessfully challenged Eli Drake for the GFW Global Championship.

On February 24, 2019, Cody wrestled his final match for Noah.

=== DDT Pro-Wrestling (2019–2020) ===
In 2019, Cody Hall began to work for the Japanese DDT Pro-Wrestling promotion. However, he left the promotion after making an anti-Asian "yellow fever" joke on Twitter about the COVID-19 pandemic.

=== Major League Wrestling (2020) ===
On December 4, 2020, Major League Wrestling announced that Hall had been signed to the company, however, he was released from his contract.

In 2023, Kevin Nash gave an update about Hall's condition, saying that his neck was broken in Japan and he is currently trying to piece his life together since his career-ending surgery and the loss of his father the year before.

== Championships and accomplishments ==
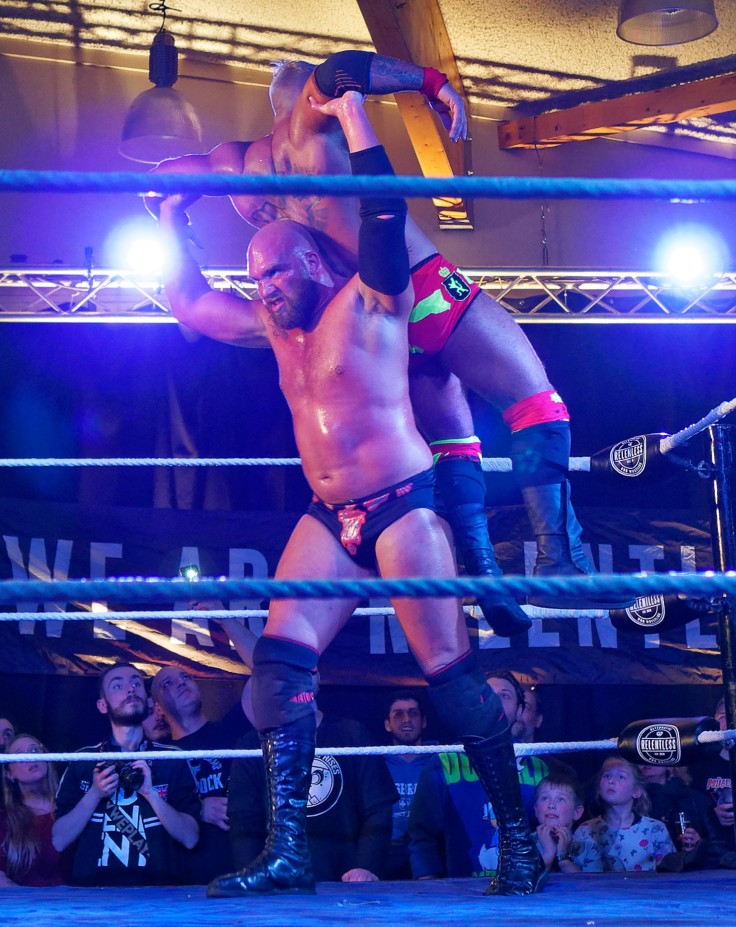
Hall adopted his father's finishing move, the Razor's Edge.

- Cincy Wrestling
  - Cincy Wrestling Championship (1 time, inaugural)
- Rocket City Championship Wrestling
  - RCCW "Worlds" Heavyweight Champion (2021)
  - Cincy Wrestling Title Tournament (2022)
- European Wrestling Promotion
  - EWP Junior Championship (1 time)
- Independent Pro Wrestling Germany
  - IPW International German Championship (1 time)
- Pro Wrestling Illustrated
  - Ranked No. 317 of the top 500 singles wrestlers in the PWI 500 in 2018
- Southern Fried Championship Wrestling
  - SFCW Georgia Heavyweight Championship (1 time)
- Superstars of Wrestling
  - SOW Championship (1 time)
