= Dante Leon (wrestler) =

American professional wrestler

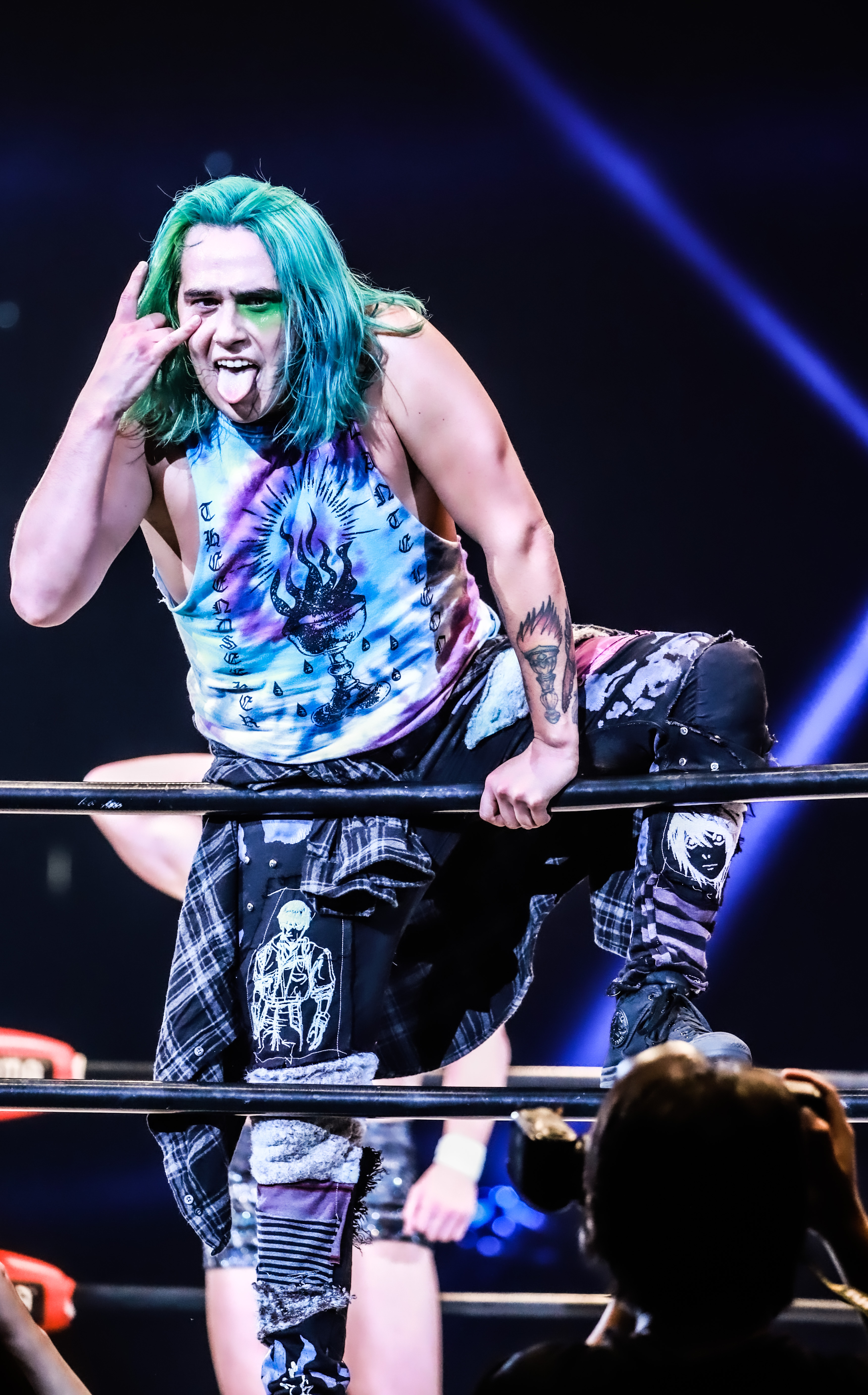
- Leon in October 2022

Personal information
- Born: August 12, 1994 (age 32) Dallas, Texas, United States

Professional wrestling career
- Ring name(s): Ayden Alexander; Dante Leon
- Billed height: 5 ft 6 in (168 cm)
- Billed weight: 165 lb (75 kg)
- Trained by: Seth Rollins; Marek Brave
- Debut: 2016

Marcos Meza, better known by his ring name Dante Leon, is an American professional wrestler, He is signed to Pro Wrestling Noah, where he is a former one-time GHC Junior Heavyweight Champion. He also makes appearances on the Game Changer Wrestling (GCW) and independent circuit.

== Professional wrestling career ==
=== Independent American circuit (2016–present) ===
Due to mainly being a freelancer, Meza is known for appearing in various promotions from the American independent scene. At Tales From The Ring 5, an event promoted by The Wrestling Revolver on September 17, 2022, he unsuccessfully challenged Mike Bailey for the Impact X Division Championship in a seven-way scramble match also involving Billie Starkz, Chris Bey, Gringo Loco, JD Griffey and KC Navarro.

==== AAW Wrestling (2017–present) ====
At AAW Path Of Redemption 2018, Meza competed in a Heritage rumble match won by Paco and also involving Ace Romero, Hakim Zane, Maxwell Jacob Friedman and others. At AAW Windy City Classic XVI on November 26, 2021, Meza filled in for an injured Stallion Rogers and teamed up with Jake Something to defend the AAW Tag Team Championship. They came out unsuccessful against Ace Perry and Alexander Hammerstone.

==== Game Changer Wrestling (2021–present) ====
Meza debuted in Game Changer Wrestling on April 8, 2021, at GCW Jimmy Lloyd's D-Generation F 2021 where he picked up a victory over Myron Reed. On the first night of the GCW Homecoming Weekend 2021 from July 24, Meza competed in a six-man scramble match won by Atticus Cougar and also involving Brayden Lee, Jack Cartwheel, Jordan Oliver and Shane Mercer. One night later at the second event, he teamed up with Ninja Mack to unsuccessfully challenge The Second Gear Crew (Mance Warner and Matthew Justice) for the Game Changer Wrestling Tag Team Championship. Meza took part in multiple large matches contested for various prizes hosted by the promotion. At GCW Die For This on January 1, 2022, he competed in a battle royal to determine the number one contender for the GCW World Championship won by Homicide and also involving notable opponents such as Colby Corino, PCO and Tony Deppen. At GCW Joey Janela's Spring Break 6 Part 2 from April 1, 2022, Meza competed in a 54-person clusterfuck battle royal won by The Second Gear Crew (AJ Gray, Mance Warner and Matthew Justice) and also involving Edith Surreal, Jimmy Wang Yang, Joey Janela, Josh Barnett, LuFisto, Maven, Rhett Titus and many others. At GCW The Art Of War 2022 on September 3, Meza competed in a ladder match disputed for Joey Janela's DDT Extreme Championship in which Janela also retained over Cole Radrick, Drago Kid, Gringo Loco, Mike Bailey, Shane Mercer and Tony Deppen.

=== Pro Wrestling Noah (2022–present) ===
Meza made his first appearance in Pro Wrestling Noah at Noah Destination 2022 on July 16, where he fell short to Ninja Mack in a Singles match. He continued to compete in various of the promotion's signature events. At Noah Departure 2022 from August 5, he teamed up with Atsushi Kotoge and Yo-Hey in a losing effort against Daisuke Harada, Ninja Mack and Seiki Yoshioka. At Noah Ariake Triumph 2022 on October 30, he teamed up with Jack Morris to defeat Daiki Inaba and Yo-Hey. At Noah Global Honored Crown 2022 on November 10, he defeated Ninja Mack to win the GHC Junior Heavyweight Championship. One month and a half later at N Innovation 2022 on December 23, he dropped the title to Amakusa. At Noah The New Year 2023 on January 1, Meza teamed up with Alejandro and Ninja Mack to defeat Kongo (Hi69, Shuji Kondo and Tadasuke). At The Great Muta Final "Bye-Bye" on January 22, 2023, Meza teamed up with Yo-Hey and Kzy in a losing effort against Amakusa, Último Dragón and Ninja Mack.

=== WWE (2019) ===
Meza wrestled a match in WWE on December 16, 2019, at Raw, falling short to Erick Rowan as a local competitor.

== Championships and accomplishments ==
- Mat War Pro Wrestling
  - Mat War Pro Trinity River Heritage Championship (1 time)
- Loko Wrestling
  - Loko Championship (1 time)
- Pro Wrestling Noah
  - GHC Junior Heavyweight Championship (1 time)
