= Naomichi Hanazono =

Japanese singer and dancer

- 花園 直道
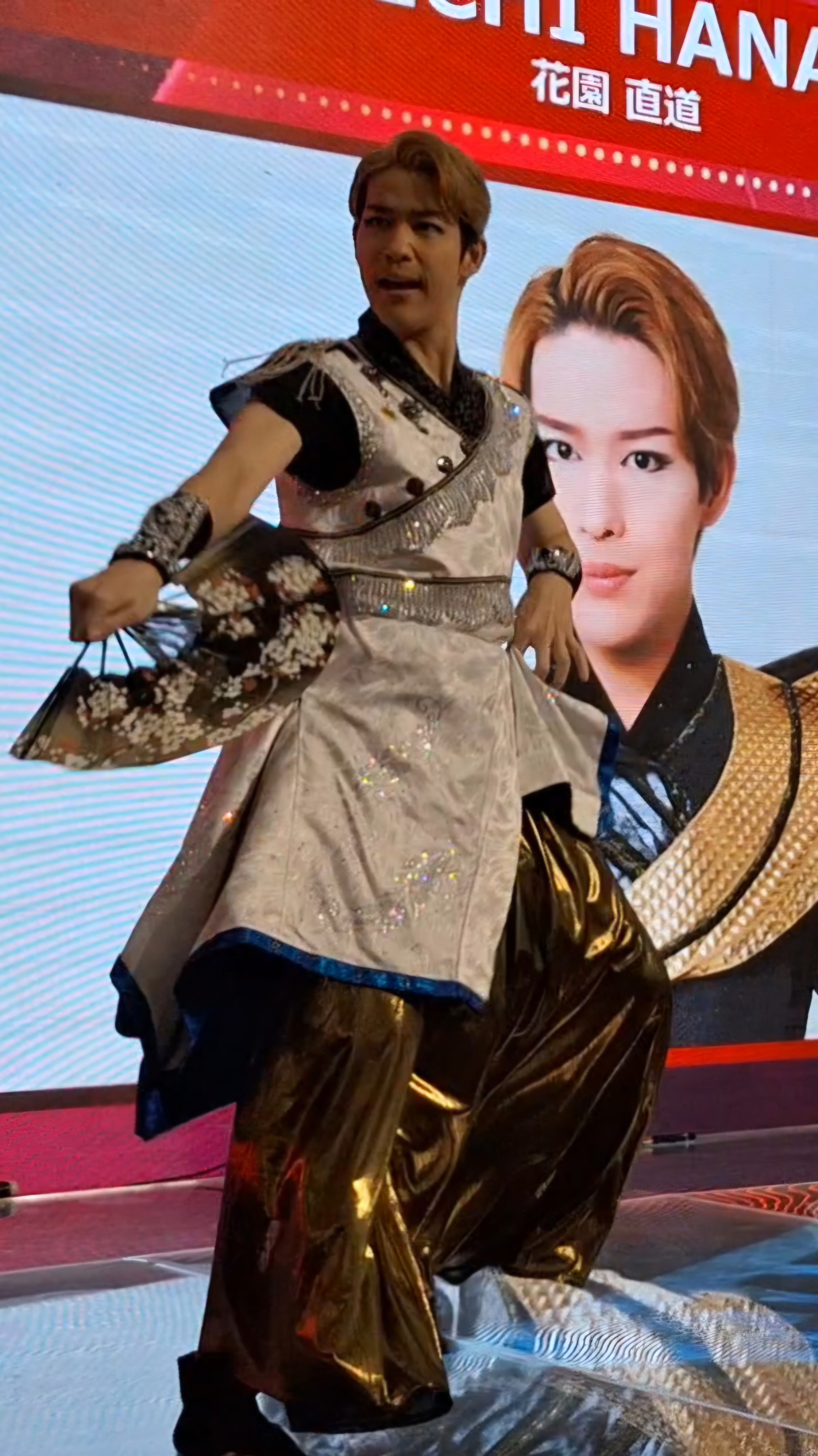
- Naomichi performing at Japan Expo Thailand in 2025
- Born: August 19, 1988 (age 38); Tokyo, Japan
- Education: Nihon University – College of Art (dropped out to focus on entertainment)
- Occupations: Singer; Dancer
- Agent: Tokuma Japan Communications
- Style: Traditional
- Height: 181 cm (5 ft 11 in)
- Website: http://naomichi.net

Naomichi Hanazono (Japanese: 花園 直道) is a Japanese classical dance performer and singer.

== Career ==
He began studying classical dance in the Bandō style (Natori / Bandō Tsutayuki-ryū) as well as Tsugaru shamisen at an early age. Seeking to create an innovative form of Japanese dance with a fresh sensibility—an approach he personally termed "Japanese"—he combined traditional dance with vocal performance. In 2006, he formed the dance group Kabuto, and their performances have since been warmly received both in Japan and internationally.

He made his major debut as a singer in April 2011 with the release of "Hana no Hana" under Tokuma Japan Communications. His third single, "Tokyo A Go Go," went on to reach No. 1 on the Wired Request Chart in the Enka/Kayō category.

He also performed internationally in countries like the United States, France, Taiwan, South Korea, and Thailand.

== Trivia ==
- His blood type is O.
- His hobby is fishing.
- His nickname is "Nao-chan (なおちゃん)."
