= Naomichi Marufuji =

Japanese professional wrestler (born 1979)

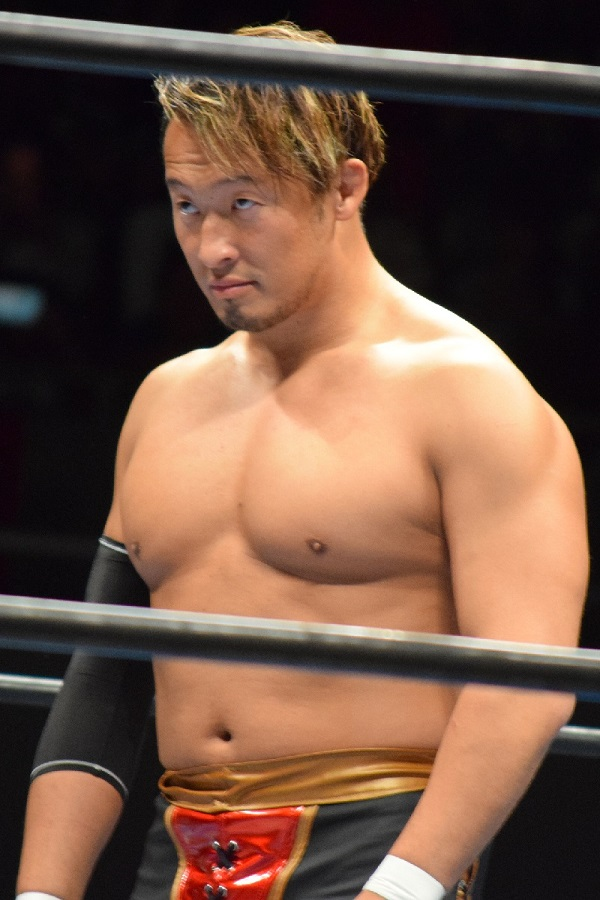
- Marufuji in 2016

Personal information
- Born: September 26, 1979 (age 47) Kōnosu, Saitama, Japan

Professional wrestling career
- Ring name(s): Doctor Marufuji Jr. Marufuji; Naomichi Marufuji; Pennywise
- Billed height: 1.76 m (5 ft 9 in)
- Billed weight: 90 kg (198 lb)
- Trained by: AJPW Dojo; Giant Baba; Mitsuharu Misawa
- Debut: August 28, 1998

Naomichi Marufuji (丸藤正道, Marufuji Naomichi; born September 26, 1979) is a Japanese professional wrestler, wrestling executive, and restaurateur. He is signed to Pro Wrestling Noah, where is the vice-president of CyberFight, the parent company of Noah (a role he has held since 2020). Known as the Genius of the Ark (方舟の天才, Hakobune no Tensai), Marufuji has been one of the longest signed talent in the history of Pro Wrestling Noah, with his career seeing to him becoming the first and only wrestler to win every single title in both the heavyweight and junior heavyweight divisions, as well as the first of two men to win Junior Heavyweight Championships in all three major Japanese promotions (Minoru Tanaka is the other). Marufuji is widely referred to as one of the most influential professional wrestlers of the modern era, inspiring many international and national wrestlers such as Seth Rollins, Will Ospreay, Kenny Omega, and others; his notes as an influential wrestler have garnered him the nickname "The Mastermind Behind Modern Wrestling".

Marufuji made his wrestling debut in 1998 as part of All Japan Pro Wrestling and its dojo; after the 2000 Exodus, he joined his only surviving trainer and mentor, Mitsuharu Misawa, to join Pro Wrestling Noah, a promotion he has worked for consistently since its founding. He, along with Takashi Sugiura, are the only two members of the Noah roster who have remained in the company since its founding. After a successful run as a junior heavyweight wrestler in his early Noah run, he advanced to the heavyweight division, quickly winning the GHC Heavyweight Championship in an upset win against Jun Akiyama. Though Marufuji would lose the title of Misawa later on, he stayed as both a heavyweight and junior heavyweight wrestler ever since.

== Early life & career (before 2000) ==
Naomichi Marufuji was born the youngest of four siblings on September 26, 1979. Originally, his name was supposed to be Masao or Masamichi, but was changed to Naomichi (正道; "the right path"). His brothers include Kimiyasu (b. 1972) and twins Hirotaka and Fumitaka (b. 1973). Hirotaka Marufuji later became an animator and was part of the team behind Genesis of Aquarion and the Macross series. His eldest brother, Kimiyasu, was an avid wrestling fan, and showed Marufuji wrestling magazines when he was younger (Marufuji's favorite wrestlers that he saw in the magazines were the Road Warriors). He became a fan of New Japan's Three Musketeers as he got older, yet also idolized Mitsuharu Misawa.

As he had aspired to become a full-time professional wrestler after graduating high school, he enlisted into his junior high school's amateur wrestling program whilst also doing basketball. One of the senior members of that program, Ryuji Hijikata, later also became a professional wrestler. He first received post-curricular martial arts training at Satoru Sayama's Super Tiger Gym near Higashi-Ōmiya Station in Saitama.

Mitsuharu Misawa gave Marufuji an opportunity to train at the All Japan Pro Wrestling dojo via phone, which he accepted. After a week of training, Marufuji was accepted as a full-time rookie wrestler. He became part of the class also consisting of Kentaro Shiga, Yoshinobu Kanemaru, Takeshi Morishima and Makoto Hashi. For the first two years of his career, under Giant Baba and Mitsuharu Misawa's isolationist policy, he was a jobber. His debut match came on August 28, 1998, against Kanemaru. One of the few rare interpromotional matches he worked was in Michinoku Pro Wrestling in 1999, a lucha libre six-man tag match, gave him a chance to shine.

== Professional wrestling career (2000–present) ==
=== Pro Wrestling Noah (2000–present) ===
After the Noah secession, he joined the upstart promotion and became an integral part of its Junior Heavyweight division, impressing many with his high-flying style and charisma. He would go on to form a successful tag team with KENTA and win the 2004 Super J-Cup. In early and mid-2005, Marufuji toured through Germany and Austria, competing for Westside Xtreme Wrestling and Rings of Europe. Along with Minoru Suzuki, they were the first talent delegation that was sent over that began the Noah/European Talent Trade Partnership. On March 5, 2006, Marufuji pinned former Triple Crown Heavyweight Champion and former GHC Heavyweight Champion Akira Taue.

On September 9, 2006, Naomichi defeated Jun Akiyama for the GHC Heavyweight Championship at the Budokan Hall, utilizing the Perfect Inside Cradle. In doing so, he became the first wrestler to win all GHC titles in Noah at the time (Heavyweight, Tag Team, Junior Heavyweight, Junior Heavyweight Tag Team, and Openweight Hardcore), and became the lightest GHC Heavyweight Champion at the time. A little over a month later, Marufuji's successfully defended the title against his tag team partner Kenta on October 29. The match received critical acclaim, and Tokyo Sports named the match the 2006 Match of the Year. On December 10, Marufuji lost the GHC Heavyweight Championship to Mitsuharu Misawa in his third defense.

On July 5, 2009, Marufuji was appointed to the position of Noah's vice president alongside Kenta Kobashi by Noah's current President, Akira Taue, in the wake of Misawa's death.

On July 5, 2014, Marufuji won the GHC Heavyweight Championship for the second time, defeating Yuji Nagata. That same month he defended the championship against BRAVE stablemate Katsuhiko Nakajima on July 21. He then defeated Takeshi Morishima on August 24 in his second title defense at Korakuen Hall. That same night, Maybach Taniguchi won a number one contenders match over Nakajima and the two men squared off on September 23 at the 'Great Voyage in Niigata' show where Marufuji successfully retained his championship. Shortly after, he retained the championship for a fourth time by defeating Daisuke Sekimoto of Big Japan Pro Wrestling at the 'Great Voyage in Yokohama' show on October 23. Marufuji then, still as champion, took part in the 2014 Global League. Marufuji finished with eight points and a four-win, three-loss record, including losses to Nakajima, Morishima, and Satoshi Kojima. Marufuji defeated the Global League winner Takashi Sugiura on December 6 at the 'Great Voyage in Tokyo vol.3' show. Following Marufuji's appearance on Wrestle Kingdom 9, the New Japan stable Suzuki-gun made their debut in Noah invading the company and on March 15, 2015, Marufuji lost his title to the stable's leader Minoru Suzuki.

Marufuji took part in the 2015 Global Tag League with Katsuhiko Nakajima as his partner. The pair finished with six points and a disappointing fourth-place finish in the six-team block. However, at 'Great Voyage in Yokohama' on May 10, Marufuji received a rematch with Suzuki for the championship. Marufuji, however, ultimately came up short in his attempt to dethrone the Suzuki-gun leader. Marufuji continued the year outside of the title picture taking part in tag team matches squaring off with Suzuki-gun foes, however at the September 19 'Great Voyage in Osaka' show Marufuji defeated BRAVE stablemate Atsushi Kotoge. Marufuji then took part in the 2015 Global League. Marufuji began the tournament with four straight victories, however a loss to Masato Tanaka on October 29 and a subsequent loss to Satoshi Kojima at the next show on November 3 put Marufuji in a four-way tie on points at the top of his block. On the final group stage day, paired with a loss by Tanaka, Marufuji beat fellow co-first place contender Chris Hero to win the block and advance to the final on November 8. In the final, Marufuji defeated fellow Suzuki-gun member Shelton Benjamin who had finished his block without a single loss to go on and receive a championship opportunity. Marufuji received his title match at the DESTINY 2015 show and he regained the title from Suzuki on December 23, 2015. However, immediately following the match as his Noah roster members celebrated with him, Takashi Sugiura turned on Marufuji to join forces with Suzuki-gun.

On January 31, 2016, Marufuji faltered in his first defense of his newly won championship as he lost the title to Takashi Sugiura. The next month, on February 19, Marufuji took part in a ten-man tag team match that pitted Suzuki-gun members against Noah roster members. Marufuji was the second to last person eliminated being pinned by Sugiura. On March 19, 2016, Marufuji continued to battle against the Suzuki-gun stable that had invaded Noah as he alongside Muhammad Yone and Mitsuhiro Kitamiya defeated Shelton Benjamin, Takashi Iizuka, and Suzuki himself in a six-man tag team match the 2016 'Great Voyage In Korakuen' event.

From April 21 to May 4, Marufuji took part in the 2016 Global Tag League with Toru Yano, who took part despite being mainly a competitor in New Japan Pro-Wrestling. The pair got eight points, good enough for second in the block, and ultimately avenged a loss by defeating Killer Elite Squad in the finals. As a result of winning the tag league, the duo won a shot at the GHC Tag Team Championships held by Killer Elite Squad. On May 28 at the 2016 'Great Voyage In Osaka' event, the pair defeated Killer Elite Squad and became the new GHC Tag Team Champions. The pair's first match as champions was an immediate title defense over the former champions at 'Emerald Spirits In Korakuen' on June 12. The pair defended their championships twice more before Marufuji went to New Japan to take part in the 2016 G1 Climax. They defeated Suzuki and Iizuka on July 5 followed by a defense over Katsuhiko Nakajima and Kitamiya on July 16.

Upon Marufuji's return, he and Yano defended their belts against the team of Muhammad Yone and Quiet Storm, known as '50 Funky Powers', on September 23 and, as a continuation of his feud based in New Japan with Kazuchika Okada, Marufuji and Yano retained their championships over Okada and Chaos stablemate Yoshi-Hashi on October 8. The pair defended their belts yet again on October 23 at 'Great Voyage 2016 In Yokohama Vol. 2' where they defeated Great Bash Heel (Togi Makabe and Tomoaki Honma) From November 3 to November 22 Marufuji took part in the 2016 Global League and was placed in the 'B' block. Marufuji, with eight points, faced off with Masa Kitamiya on the final day's main event and a spot in the tournament final on the line, however, Marufuji ultimately lost and Kitamiya finished first in the B block. The next day, the day of the Global League Final, Marufuji and Yano lost their championships to Killer Elite Squad, the team they defeated for the belts six months prior and thus marking the end of the team. The final tour of 2016 went poorly for Marufuji as he and his various partners were unable to beat the team of Alejandro Saez and Takashi Sugiura the entire tour and, on the final show of 2016, Marufuji was defeated in a singles match by Sugiura.

On the first show of 2017 on January 7, Marufuji and partner Atsushi Kotoge failed to dethrone GHC Tag Team Champions Go Shiozaki and Maybach Taniguchi in a championship opportunity. At the 2017 'Great Voyage In Yokohama' show on March 12, Marufuji teamed with Japanese wrestling legend Keiji Muto to defeat debuting Impact Wrestling star Moose and Kazma Sakamoto. Marufuji formed a new team with former rival Maybach Taniguchi and, on the April 14 'Countdown to GTL' show, the new pairing defeated Takashi Sugiura and Kenoh for the GHC Tag Team Championships shortly before the start of the 2017 Global Tag League's beginning. The team took part in the tag league finishing at the top of the block with ten points and ultimately won the final as well by defeating Shiozaki and Kotoge. The champion duo was then promptly challenged by a team they lost to in the tournament, Cody Hall and Randy Reign, and on June 4 Marufuji and Taniguchi defeated them in a championship title defense. On August 26, Marufuji and Taniguchi lost the title to Atsushi Kotoge and Go Shiozaki. On December 22, the two received their rematch for the titles, but lost to 50FP (Quiet Storm and Mohammad Yone) after Taniguchi turned on him, revealing himself as the traitor within NOAH that Mitsuya Nagai had been hinting at for several shows. On May 29, 2018, five days after his Triple Crown challenge, Marufuji unsuccessfully challenged Takashi Sugiura for the GHC Heavyweight Championship. On July 28, Marufuji and Akitoshi Saito defeated The Aggression (Katsuhiko Nakajima and Masa Kitamiya) to win the GHC Tag Team Championship, marking his sixth reign and Saito's fifth reign with the titles.

On June 6, 2021, at CyberFight Festival, Marufuji won the GHC Heavyweight Championship from Keiji Mutoh. He successfully defended it against Takashi Sugiura and Kazushi Sakuraba before losing it to Katsuhiko Nakajima on October 10.

In 2023, Kenta and Marufuji reunited in NOAH for the GHC tag titles.

As part of the partnership between WWE and NOAH, Marufuji faced AJ Styles at Noah Destination 2024 on July 13, 2024, at Nippon Budokan but was defeated with Styles Clash.

On May 5, 2026, Marufuji defeated Alpha Wolf to obtain the GHC National Championship, becoming the promotions first ever Grand Slam Champion due to having won every other title in the promotion at the time (with the exception of the GHC 200 Championship that was introduced two months after). On Ocotober 25, Marufuji lost the GHC National Championship to Luis Mante, ending his reign at 173 days and with four successful defenses.

=== New Japan Pro-Wrestling (2003–2016) ===
On June 10, 2003, Marufuji made his debut for New Japan Pro-Wrestling (NJPW), teaming with Kotaro Suzuki to unsuccessfully challenge Jyushin Thunder Liger and Koji Kanemoto for the IWGP Junior Heavyweight Tag Team Championship. Marufuji returned to the company on December 9, failing in his attempt to win the IWGP U-30 Openweight Championship from Hiroshi Tanahashi. On May 3, 2004, Marufuji would make his final appearance for NJPW in over five years in a six-man tag team match, where he, Heat and Tiger Mask were defeated by the American Dragon, Koji Kanemoto, and Último Dragón.

On December 22, 2009, Marufuji made his return to NJPW, defeating Jyushin Thunder Liger in the first round of the 2009 Super J-Cup. The following day he defeated Tigers Mask, Ryusuke Taguchi, and finally Prince Devitt in the finals, to win the Super J-Cup and earn a match for the IWGP Junior Heavyweight Championship. On January 4, 2010, Marufuji represented Noah in the New Japan vs. Noah match series at Wrestle Kingdom IV in Tokyo Dome, where he defeated Tiger Mask to win the IWGP Junior Heavyweight Championship. With his victory Marufuji became the first person to hold the three major Junior Heavyweight Titles in Japan (All Japan, Noah, and NJPW). On June 19 at Dominion 6.19, Marufuji lost the IWGP Junior Heavyweight Championship to Prince Devitt.

Marufuji's next appearance for NJPW was on January 4, 2012, at Wrestle Kingdom VI in Tokyo Dome, where he and Go Shiozaki defeated CHAOS Top Team (Shinsuke Nakamura and Toru Yano) in a tag team match. Marufuji returned to NJPW that August to take part in the 2012 G1 Climax tournament. After a slow start, which saw Marufuji lose two of his first three matches, he bounced back by defeating reigning IWGP Heavyweight Champion Hiroshi Tanahashi on August 5 and afterward made a challenge for his title. After four wins and three losses, Marufuji was eliminated from the tournament on August 12, after losing to Toru Yano in his final round-robin match. Following the tournament, Marufuji was named the number one contender to the IWGP Heavyweight Championship. On September 23 at Destruction, Marufuji unsuccessfully challenged Tanahashi for the IWGP Heavyweight Championship.

On September 29, 2013, Marufuji returned to New Japan, challenging Shinsuke Nakamura to a match for the IWGP Intercontinental Championship. Marufuji failed in his title challenge on October 14 at King of Pro-Wrestling. Marufuji returned to New Japan on December 20, 2014, when he, along with fellow Noah wrestlers TMDK (Mikey Nicholls and Shane Haste), was revealed as one of Toru Yano's tag team partners at Wrestle Kingdom 9 in Tokyo Dome on January 4, 2015. At the event, the four defeated Suzuki-gun (Davey Boy Smith Jr., Lance Archer, Shelton X Benjamin and Takashi Iizuka) in an eight-man tag team match.

Marufuji returned to NJPW on July 18, 2016, by entering the 2016 G1 Climax tournament and defeating reigning IWGP Heavyweight Champion Kazuchika Okada in his opening match. On August 12, Marufuji finished his tournament with a record of five wins and four losses with a loss against Hirooki Goto on the final day eliminating him from the finals. Marufuji's win over Okada earned him a shot at the IWGP Heavyweight Championship on October 10 at King of Pro-Wrestling, where Okada retained the title.

=== Ring of Honor (2005–2007) ===
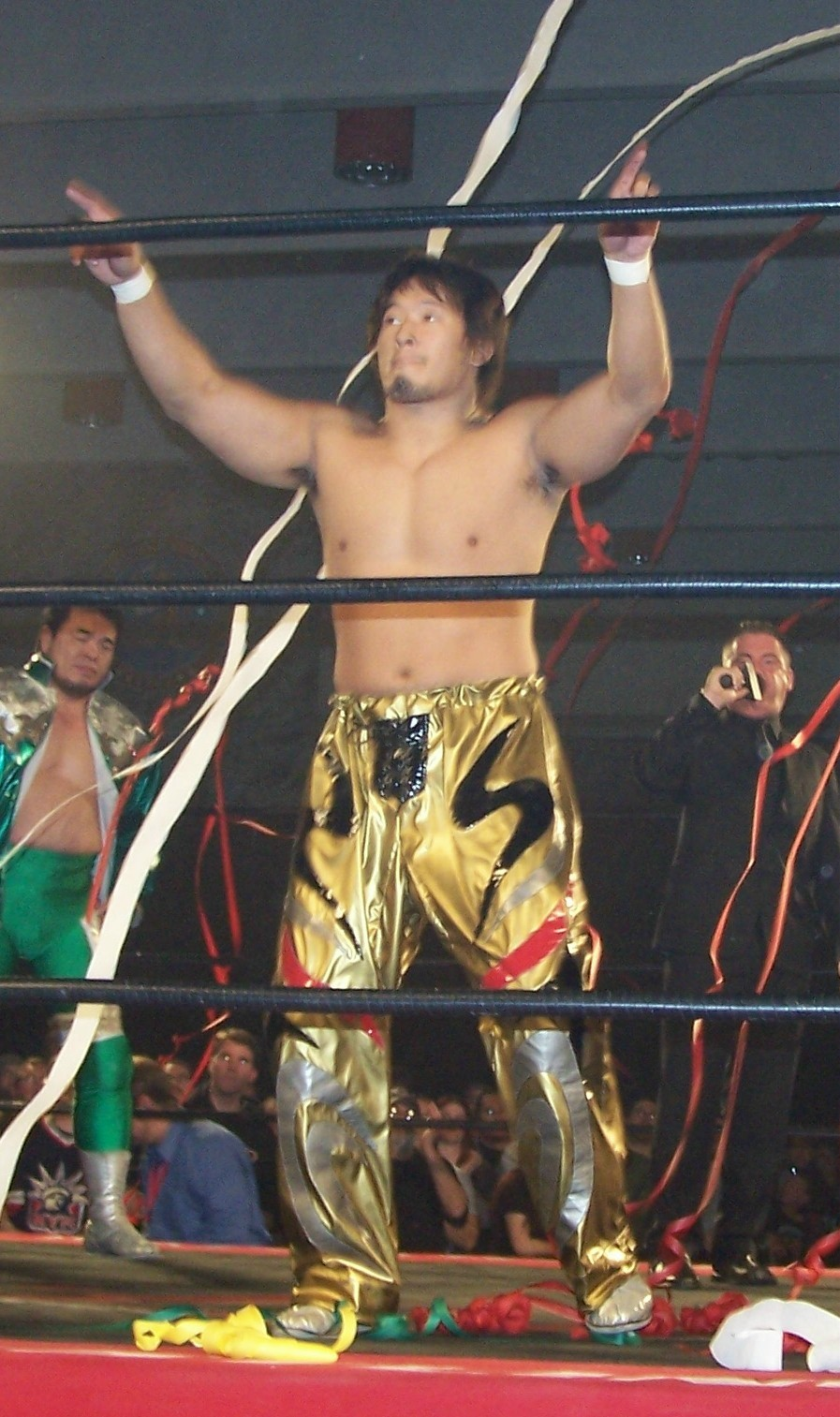
Marufuji in November 2007

As part of his foreign excursion to the United States, Marufuji challenged Bryan Danielson for the ROH World Championship on December 17, 2005, in Edison, New Jersey. Danielson retained his title, but the crowd gave Marufuji a loud ovation after the match.

Marufuji returned to the United States to wrestle for Ring of Honor on the main event of the "Best in the World" show on March 25, 2006, show in New York City, teaming with Kenta for the first time in the United States against the team of Samoa Joe and Bryan Danielson; the team of Marufuji and Kenta won after Kenta pinned Danielson.

Marufuji returned to Ring of Honor for a third tour, along with Kenta. Both started off the tour with a win, teaming up to defeat the Briscoe Brothers at Glory By Honor V: Night 1. The following night at Glory By Honor V: Night 2, he successfully defended the GHC Heavyweight Championship against Nigel McGuinness. Marufuji also appeared at Ring of Honor's first pay-per-view, Respect Is Earned, where he defeated Rocky Romero.

=== Returns to AJPW (2008, 2018) ===
On September 28, 2008, ten years after his original debut in All Japan Pro Wrestling, Marufuji returned to AJPW and won the World Junior Heavyweight Championship from Ryuji Hijikata. He would go on to successfully defend the title against Shuji Kondo in a match that won the Tokyo Sports Best Bout of 2008 award and Takashi Okita before losing it to Kaz Hayashi.

Marufuji returned to AJPW to compete in the 2018 Champion Carnival, where he finished his block with a record of five wins and two losses to advance to the finals. The following day, he defeated B Block winner and Triple Crown Heavyweight Champion Kento Miyahara to win the Champion Carnival. He faced him for the title a month later and lost.

=== Return to New Japan Pro-Wrestling (2023) ===
He returned to NJPW for one night only on January 21, 2023, at Wrestle Kingdom 17's third night, to team up with the Bullet Club (El Phantasmo, Kenta and Gedo) against Hiroshi Tanahashi, Takashi Sugiura, Toru Yano and Satoshi Kojima) in an eight-man tag team match, which they lost. After the match, he got dishonorably kicked out of Bullet Club by Kenta due to Sugiura-gun tensions and vendettas.

== Personal life ==
Marufuji wed his wife in 2005, and gave birth to their eldest son in 2006. He operates the Shiranui Curry City's Bar in Minato-ku, and became the owner of Muscle Grill Tokyo in 2018. He is known for being a drinker, preferring red wine and sake.

== Championships and accomplishments ==
- All Japan Pro Wrestling
  - World Junior Heavyweight Championship (1 time)
  - Champion Carnival (2018)
- CyberFight
  - 1st Universe Cup (2026)
- DDT Pro-Wrestling
  - KO-D Tag Team Championship (1 time) – with Harashima
- Osaka Pro Wrestling
  - Super J-Cup (2004)
- New Japan Pro-Wrestling
  - IWGP Junior Heavyweight Championship (1 time)
  - Super J-Cup (2009)
  - Tag Team Best Bout (2003) with Kotaro Suzuki vs. Jyushin Thunder Liger and Koji Kanemoto on June 10
- Nikkan Sports
  - Match of the Year Award (2006) vs. Kenta on October 29
  - Match of the Year Award (2008) vs. Kenta on October 25
  - Outstanding Performance Award (2006)
  - Technique Award (2008)
  - Wrestler of the Year (2006)
- Pro Wrestling Illustrated
  - Ranked No. 27 of the top 500 singles wrestlers in the PWI 500 in 2007
- Pro Wrestling Noah
  - GHC Heavyweight Championship (4 times)
  - GHC National Championship (1 time)
  - GHC Junior Heavyweight Championship (1 time)
  - GHC Openweight Hardcore Championship (1 time)
  - GHC Tag Team Championship (10 times) – with Minoru Suzuki (1), Takashi Sugiura (3), Toru Yano (1), Maybach Taniguchi (1), Akitoshi Saito (1), Masaaki Mochizuki (1), Keiji Mutoh (1) and Kenoh (1)
  - GHC Junior Heavyweight Tag Team Championship (2 times, inaugural) – with Kenta (1) and Atsushi Aoki (1)
  - First Pro Wrestling Noah Grand Slam Champion
  - Differ Cup (2005) – with Kenta
  - Global League (2015)
  - Global Tag League (2012) – with Muhammad Yone
  - Global Tag League (2016) – with Toru Yano
  - Global Tag League (2017) – with Maybach Taniguchi
  - One Night Six Man Tag Team Tournament (2007) – with Go Shiozaki and Ippei Ota
  - Two Day Tag Team Tournament (2004) – with Takeshi Rikio
  - GHC Heavyweight Title Shot Tournament (2007)
  - Global League Technique Award (2013)
  - Global Tag League Outstanding Performance Award (2014) – with Katsuhiko Nakajima
  - MVP Award (2014)
- Tokyo Sports
  - Best Tag Team Award (2003) with Kenta
  - Match of the Year Award (2006) vs. Kenta (October 29, 2006)
  - Match of the Year Award (2008) vs. Shuji Kondo (November 3, 2008)
  - Match of the Year Award (2016) vs. Kazuchika Okada on July 18
  - Outstanding Performance Award (2006, 2018)
- World Entertainment Wrestling
  - WEW Tag Team Championship (1 time) – with Tamon Honda
- Wrestling Observer Newsletter
  - Tag Team of the Year (2003, 2004) with Kenta
