= Junior heavyweight =

Junior heavyweight is an alternate name for cruiserweight used in multiple combat sports:

- Cruiserweight (boxing), a weight class in boxing between light heavyweight and heavyweight. The current weight limit for the division is 200lbs (14st 4lbs/90.7kg). When originally established, the weight limit was 190lbs (13st.8 lbs./86.2kg).
- Cruiserweight (professional wrestling), a championship division traditionally for wrestlers weighing 220lbs (100kg) or less. This weight limit was used in the now-defunct WCW and is still used by most Japanese promotions. WWE's cruiserweight division was open to wrestlers billed as 205lbs or less.
