= WWE Cruiserweight Championship =

Two professional wrestling championships have been named WWE Cruiserweight Championship by WWE:

- WWE Cruiserweight Championship (1996–2007) – originally established as the WCW Cruiserweight Championship by World Championship Wrestling in 1996, it was acquired by the World Wrestling Federation in 2001 and renamed WWF Cruiserweight Championship before becoming the WWE Cruiserweight Championship when the WWF was renamed WWE in 2002; the title was then retired in 2007
- NXT Cruiserweight Championship (2016–2022) – originally established as the WWE Cruiserweight Championship by WWE in 2016 (separate lineage from the previous title), it was renamed NXT Cruiserweight Championship when it was moved to WWE's NXT brand in 2019; it was then retired in 2022
