= N-1 Victory =

Japanese professional wrestling tournament

The N-1 Victory is an annual professional wrestling round-robin tournament held by Pro Wrestling Noah, established in 2010 as the Global League. In 2019, the tournament was rebranded as the N-1 Victory.

The N-1 Victory adopts a points system, with two points for a win, one for a time expired draw, and, none for other draw or a loss. The tournament matches are held under the GHC title match rules as the base rule, having a 30-minute time limit. The prize for winning the tournament is a shot at the GHC Heavyweight Championship. In the 2024 edition, Kaito Kiyomiya, reigning GHC Heavyweight Champion, defended the title in the final.

In the below results, (c) signifies the GHC Heavyweight Champion at the time of each tournament.

== List of winners ==
Tournament	Year	Winner	Total won
Global League	2010	Yoshihiro Takayama	1
Global League	2011	Takeshi Morishima	1
Global League	2012	Kenta	1
Global League	2013	Yuji Nagata	1
Global League	2014	Takashi Sugiura	1
Global League	2015	Naomichi Marufuji	1
Global League	2016	Minoru Suzuki	1
Global League	2017	Kenoh	1
Global League	2018	Kaito Kiyomiya	1
N-1 Victory	2019	Kenoh	2
N-1 Victory	2020	Katsuhiko Nakajima	1
N-1 Victory	2021	Katsuhiko Nakajima	2
N-1 Victory	2022	Kaito Kiyomiya	2
N-1 Victory	2023	Go Shiozaki	1
N-1 Victory	2024	Kaito Kiyomiya	3
N-1 Victory	2025	Masa Kitamiya	1
N-1 Victory	2026	Ozawa	1

== 2010 ==
The 2010 Global League was held from March 28 to May 2, through the Spring Navigation 2010 tour. The tournament featured a block system, with twelve wrestlers divided in two blocks of six. The top finishing wrestlers from each block met in the final.

Final standings
Block A		Block B	
Jun Akiyama	8	Yoshihiro Takayama	7
Kensuke Sasaki	7	Toshiaki Kawada	6
Takashi Sugiura (C)	6	Takeshi Morishima	5
Bison Smith	4	Muhammad Yone	5
Takeshi Rikio	3	Akitoshi Saito	4
Takuma Sano	2	Naomichi Marufuji	3

Block A	Sugiura	Rikio	Smith	Sano	Akiyama	Sasaki
Sugiura	—N/a	Draw (30:00)	Sugiura (20:04)	Sugiura (16:20)	Akiyama (21:49)	Draw (30:00)
Rikio	Draw (30:00)	—N/a	Rikio (18:47)	Sano (04:17)	Akiyama (11:48)	Sasaki (13:27)
Smith	Sugiura (20:04)	Rikio (18:47)	—N/a	Smith (15:50)	Akiyama (12:30)	Smith (14:57)
Sano	Sugiura (16:20)	Sano (04:17)	Smith (15:50)	—N/a	Akiyama (14:02)	Sasaki (14:14)
Akiyama	Akiyama (21:49)	Akiyama (11:48)	Akiyama (12:30)	Akiyama (14:02)	—N/a	Sasaki (18:19)
Sasaki	Draw (30:00)	Sasaki (13:27)	Smith (14:57)	Sasaki (14:14)	Sasaki (18:19)	—N/a
Block B	Marufuji	Morishima	Yone	Saito	Takayama	Kawada
Marufuji	—N/a	Draw (30:00)	Yone (16:35)	Saito (13:13)	Marufuji (15:38)	Kawada (22:21)
Morishima	Draw (30:00)	—N/a	Morishima (12:39)	Saito (15:38)	Takayama (14:56)	Morishima (12:41)
Yone	Yone (16:35)	Morishima (12:39)	—N/a	Yone (12:50)	Takayama (08:15)	Draw (30:00)
Saito	Saito (13:13)	Saito (15:38)	Yone (12:50)	—N/a	Takayama (10:16)	Kawada (16:13)
Takayama	Marufuji (15:38)	Takayama (14:56)	Takayama (08:15)	Takayama (10:16)	—N/a	Draw (30:00)
Kawada	Kawada (22:21)	Morishima (12:41)	Draw (30:00)	Kawada (16:13)	Draw (30:00)	—N/a

Final
A1	Jun Akiyama	Pin
B1	Yoshihiro Takayama	13:38

== 2011 ==
The 2011 Global League was held from November 3 to November 20, through the Global League 2011 tour. The tournament featured a block system, with eighteen wrestlers divided in two blocks of nine. The top finishing wrestlers from each block met in the final.

Final standings
Block A		Block B	
Takeshi Morishima	12	Kenta	12
Go Shiozaki (C)	11	Takashi Sugiura	11
Jun Akiyama	11	Kensuke Sasaki	11
Yoshihiro Takayama	10	Bison Smith	9
Trevor Murdoch	8	Muhammad Yone	7
Yoshinobu Kanemaru	6	Takuma Sano	6
Yutaka Yoshie	6	Akitoshi Saito	6
Kotaro Suzuki	5	Shuhei Taniguchi	6
Kento Miyahara	3	Bobby Fish	4

Block A	Shiozaki	Takayama	Akiyama	Morishima	Kanemaru	Suzuki	Yoshie	Miyahara	Murdoch
Shiozaki	—N/a	Takayama (19:19)	Draw (30:00)	Morishima (15:30)	Shiozaki (11:52)	Shiozaki (15:06)	Shiozaki (16:01)	Shiozaki (11:00)	Shiozaki (15:36)
Takayama	Takayama (19:19)	—N/a	Akiyama (15:33)	Morishima (9:12)	Takyama (5:03)	Takayama (5:30)	Takayama (9:48)	Takayama (3:07)	Murdoch (9:04)
Akiyama	Draw (30:00)	Akiyama (15:33)	—N/a	Morishima (12:56)	Kanemaru (5:14)	Akiyama (7:20)	Akiyama (11:19)	Akiyama (10:04)	Akiyama (16:40)
Morishima	Morishima (15:30)	Morishima (9:12)	Morishima (12:56)	—N/a	Morishima (3:57)	Morishima (8:04)	Yoshie (12:15)	Morishima (6:22)	Murdoch (6:51)
Kanemaru	Shiozaki (11:52)	Takayama (5:03)	Kanemaru (5:14)	Morishima (3:57)	—N/a	Draw (30:00)	Yoshie (3:55)	Draw (30:00)	Kanemaru (8:10)
Suzuki	Shiozaki (15:06)	Takayama (5:30)	Akiyama (7:20)	Morishima (8:04)	Draw (30:00)	—N/a	Suzuki (6:49)	Suzuki (11:46)	Murdoch (8:24)
Yoshie	Shiozaki (16:01)	Takayama (9:48)	Akiyama (11:19)	Yoshie (12:15)	Yoshie (3:55)	Suzuki (6:49)	—N/a	Yoshie (9:28)	Murdoch (7:22)
Miyahara	Shiozaki (11:00)	Takayama (3:07)	Akiyama (10:04)	Morishima (6:22)	Draw (30:00)	Suzuki (11:46)	Yoshie (9:28)	—N/a	Miyahara (4:34)
Murdoch	Shiozaki (15:36)	Murdoch (9:04)	Akiyama (16:40)	Murdoch (6:51)	Kanemaru (8:10)	Murdoch (8:24)	Murdoch (7:22)	Miyahara (4:34)	—N/a
Block B	Kenta	Sugiura	Sano	Saito	Yone	Taniguchi	Sasaki	Smith	Fish
Kenta	—N/a	Sugiura (2:08)	Kenta (4:03)	Kenta (16:12)	Kenta (15:11)	Kenta (11:51)	Sasaki (18:04)	Kenta (12:18)	Kenta (9:24)
Sugiura	Sugiura (2:08)	—N/a	Sugiura (7:53)	Saito (16:20)	Draw (30:00)	Sugiura (17:33)	Sugiura (19:05)	Smith (25:28)	Sugiura (11:00)
Sano	Kenta (4:03)	Sugiura (7:53)	—N/a	Saito (10:05)	Sano (11:03)	Taniguchi (11:59)	Sano (11:54)	Smith (10:27)	Sano (9:12)
Saito	Kenta (16:12)	Saito (16:20)	Saito (10:05)	—N/a	Saito (5:38)	Taniguchi (10:44)	Sasaki (13:09)	Smith (11:16)	Fish (7:25)
Yone	Kenta (15:11)	Draw (30:00)	Sano (11:03)	Saito (5:38)	—N/a	Yone (11:05)	Sasaki (4:42)	Yone (8:25)	Yone (10:58)
Taniguchi	Kenta (11:51)	Sugiura (17:33)	Taniguchi (11:59)	Taniguchi (10:44)	Yone (11:05)	—N/a	Sasaki (11:27)	Taniguchi (11:58)	Fish (11:04)
Sasaki	Sasaki (18:04)	Sugiura (19:05)	Sano (11:54)	Sasaki (13:09)	Sasaki (4:42)	Sasaki (11:27)	—N/a	Draw (30:00)	Sasaki (10:10)
Smith	Kenta (12:18)	Smith (25:28)	Smith (10:27)	Smith (11:16)	Yone (8:25)	Taniguchi (11:58)	Draw (30:00)	—N/a	Smith (12:07)
Fish	Kenta (9:24)	Sugiura (11:00)	Sano (9:12)	Fish (7:25)	Yone (10:58)	Fish (11:04)	Sasaki (10:10)	Smith (12:07)	—N/a

Final
A1	Takeshi Morishima	Pin
B1	Kenta	16:43

== 2012 ==
The 2012 Global League was held from November 3 to November 23, through the Global League 2012 tour. The tournament featured a block system, with fourteen wrestlers divided in two blocks of seven. The top finishing wrestlers from each block met in the final.

Final standings
Block A		Block B	
Kenta	9	Takashi Sugiura	8
Takeshi Morishima (C)	8	Maybach Taniguchi	8
Yuji Nagata	8	Naomichi Marufuji	6
Go Shiozaki	6	Akitoshi Saito	6
Muhammad Yone	6	Jun Akiyama	6
Mikey Nicholls	3	Katsuhiko Nakajima	4
Kento Miyahara	2	Shane Haste	4

Block A	Shiozaki	Kenta	Miyahara	Nicholls	Yone	Morishima	Nagata
Shiozaki	—N/a	Kenta (11:03)	Shiozaki (10:29)	Nicholls (14:07)	Shiozaki (17:53)	Shiozaki (17:43)	Nagata (18:47)
Kenta	Kenta (11:03)	—N/a	Kenta (7:36)	Draw (30:00)	Kenta (13:08)	Kenta (16:55)	Nagata (16:21)
Miyahara	Shiozaki (10:29)	Kenta (7:36)	—N/a	Miyahara (6:45)	Yone (11:13)	Morishima (6:51)	Nagata (10:43)
Nicholls	Nicholls (14:07)	Draw (30:00)	Miyahara (6:45)	—N/a	Yone (4:10)	Morishima (6:34)	Nagata (12:14)
Yone	Shiozaki (17:53)	Kenta (13:08)	Yone (11:13)	Yone (4:10)	—N/a	Morishima (16:08)	Yone (15:16)
Morishima	Shiozaki (17:43)	Kenta (16:55)	Morishima (6:51)	Morishima (6:34)	Morishima (16:08)	—N/a	Morishima (15:05)
Nagata	Nagata (18:47)	Nagata (16:21)	Nagata (10:43)	Nagata (12:14)	Yone (15:16)	Morishima (15:05)	—N/a
Block B	Saito	Akiyama	Nakajima	Taniguchi	Marufuji	Haste	Sugiura
Saito	—N/a	Saito (16:28)	Saito (8:28)	Taniguchi (10:54)	Marufuji (11:58)	Haste (12:29)	Saito (12:39)
Akiyama	Saito (16:28)	—N/a	Akiyama (12:12)	Taniguchi (7:33)	Marufuji (19:58)	Akiyama (13:17)	Akiyama (15:05)
Nakajima	Saito (8:28)	Akiyama (12:12)	—N/a	Nakajima (9:58)	Marufuji (12:08)	Nakajima (9:28)	Sugiura (12:08)
Taniguchi	Taniguchi (10:54)	Taniguchi (7:33)	Nakajima (9:58)	—N/a	Taniguchi (14:05)	Taniguchi (10:40)	Sugiura (10:29)
Marufuji	Marufuji (11:58)	Marufuji (19:58)	Marufuji (12:08)	Taniguchi (14:05)	—N/a	Haste (9:11)	Sugiura (9:37)
Haste	Haste (12:29)	Akiyama (13:17)	Nakajima (9:28)	Taniguchi (10:40)	Haste (9:11)	—N/a	Sugiura (16:02)
Sugiura	Saito (12:39)	Akiyama (15:05)	Sugiura (12:08)	Sugiura (10:29)	Sugiura (9:37)	Sugiura (16:02)	—N/a

Final
A1	Kenta	Pin
B1	Takashi Sugiura	21:03

== 2013 ==
The 2013 Global League was held from October 19 to November 10. The tournament featured a block system, with fourteen wrestlers divided in two blocks of seven. The top finishing wrestlers from each block met in the final.

Final standings
Block A		Block B	
Takeshi Morishima	8	Yuji Nagata	8
Kenta (C)	6	Naomichi Marufuji	8
Muhammad Yone	6	Takashi Sugiura	6
Daisuke Sekimoto	6	Maybach Taniguchi	6
Shane Haste	6	Ryoji Sai	6
Katsuhiko Nakajima	6	Mikey Nicholls	4
Eddie Edwards	4	Akitoshi Saito	4

Block A	Sekimoto	Edwards	Nakajima	Kenta	Yone	Haste	Morishima
Sekimoto	—N/a	Sekimoto (7:42)	Sekimoto (11:05)	Kenta (21:38)	Sekimoto (11:49)	Haste (8:13)	Morishima (14:42)
Edwards	Sekimoto (7:42)	—N/a	Edwards (12:36)	Edwards (13:57)	Yone (10:39)	Haste (12:45)	Morishima (6:53)
Nakajima	Sekimoto (11:05)	Edwards (12:36)	—N/a	Nakajima (19:52)	Nakajima (5:06)	Nakajima (13:33)	Morishima (12:09)
Kenta	Kenta (21:38)	Edwards (13:57)	Nakajima (19:52)	—N/a	Kenta (18:26)	Kenta (15:33)	Morishima (9:39)
Yone	Sekimoto (11:49)	Yone (10:39)	Nakajima (5:06)	Kenta (18:26)	—N/a	Yone (9:36)	Yone (13:16)
Haste	Haste (8:13)	Haste (12:45)	Nakajima (13:33)	Kenta (15:33)	Yone (9:36)	—N/a	Haste (10:19)
Morishima	Morishima (14:42)	Morishima (6:53)	Morishima (12:09)	Morishima (9:39)	Yone (13:16)	Haste (10:19)	—N/a
Block B	Saito	Taniguchi	Nicholls	Marufuji	Sai	Sugiura	Nagata
Saito	—N/a	Taniguchi (8:49)	Saito (10:55)	Marufuji (13:07)	Sai (10:12)	Saito (13:46)	Nagata (11:08)
Taniguchi	Taniguchi (8:49)	—N/a	Nicholls (10:20)	Marufuji (15:29)	Sai (11:05)	Taniguchi (6:41)	Taniguchi (12:23)
Nicholls	Saito (10:55)	Nicholls (10:20)	—N/a	Marufuji (13:32)	Sai (6:17)	Nicholls (13:22)	Nagata (10:29)
Marufuji	Marufuji (13:07)	Marufuji (15:29)	Marufuji (13:32)	—N/a	Marufuji (10:32)	Sugiura (16:02)	Nagata (8:34)
Sai	Sai (10:12)	Sai (11:05)	Sai (6:17)	Marufuji (10:32)	—N/a	Sugiura (12:03)	Nagata (12:19)
Sugiura	Saito (13:46)	Taniguchi (6:41)	Nicholls (13:22)	Sugiura (16:02)	Sugiura (12:03)	—N/a	Sugiura (15:16)
Nagata	Nagata (11:08)	Taniguchi (12:23)	Nagata (10:29)	Nagata (8:34)	Nagata (12:19)	Sugiura (15:16)	—N/a

Final
A1	Takeshi Morishima	Pin
B1	Yuji Nagata	13:09

== 2014 ==
The 2014 Global League took place from October 18 to November 8.

Final standings
Block A		Block B	
Daisuke Sekimoto	10	Takashi Sugiura	10
Satoshi Kojima	8	Chris Hero	8
Katsuhiko Nakajima	8	Yuji Nagata	8
Naomichi Marufuji (C)	8	Masato Tanaka	8
Colt Cabana	6	Maybach Taniguchi	8
Akitoshi Saito	6	Muhammad Yone	6
Takeshi Morishima	6	Mikey Nicholls	6
Shane Haste	4	Quiet Storm	2

Block A	Saito	Cabana	Sekimoto	Nakajima	Marufuji	Kojima	Haste	Morishima
Saito	—N/a	Cabana (6:00)	Sekimoto (10:30)	Saito (14:12)	Marufuji (12:01)	Saito (12:57)	Haste (12:02)	Saito (9:01)
Cabana	Cabana (6:00)	—N/a	Sekimoto (11:50)	Nakajima (8:06)	Marufuji (9:11)	Kojima (10:14)	Cabana (10:57)	Cabana (8:43)
Sekimoto	Sekimoto (10:30)	Sekimoto (11:50)	—N/a	Sekimoto (12:15)	Marufuji (16:01)	Kojima (12:29)	Sekimoto (12:07)	Sekimoto (13:17)
Nakajima	Saito (14:12)	Nakajima (8:06)	Sekimoto (12:15)	—N/a	Nakajima (19:41)	Kojima (10:27)	Nakajima (13:36)	Nakajima (13:34)
Marufuji	Marufuji (12:01)	Marufuji (9:11)	Marufuji (16:01)	Nakajima (19:41)	—N/a	Kojima (14:41)	Marufuji (6:54)	Morishima (13:20)
Kojima	Saito (12:57)	Kojima (10:14)	Kojima (12:29)	Kojima (10:27)	Kojima (14:41)	—N/a	Haste (11:43)	Morishima (7:12)
Haste	Haste (12:02)	Cabana (10:57)	Sekimoto (12:07)	Nakajima (13:36)	Marufuji (6:54)	Haste (11:43)	—N/a	Morishima (10:09)
Morishima	Saito (9:01)	Cabana (8:43)	Sekimoto (13:17)	Nakajima (13:34)	Morishima (13:20)	Morishima (7:12)	Morishima (10:09)	—N/a
Block B	Hero	Tanaka	Taniguchi	Nicholls	Yone	Storm	Sugiura	Nagata
Hero	—N/a	Hero (13:22)	Hero (12:56)	Hero (11:26)	Yone (12:20)	Hero (8:05)	Sugiura (12:07)	Nagata (13:28)
Tanaka	Hero (13:22)	—N/a	Tanaka (10:07)	Nicholls (10:09)	Tanaka (12:34)	Tanaka (7:39)	Tanaka (15:13)	Nagata (13:37)
Taniguchi	Hero (12:56)	Tanaka (10:07)	—N/a	Taniguchi (12:06)	Taniguchi (8:23)	Taniguchi (8:11)	Sugiura (1:57)	Taniguchi (12:28)
Nicholls	Hero (11:26)	Nicholls (10:09)	Taniguchi (12:06)	—N/a	Yone (9:26)	Nicholls (8:35)	Sugiura (13:54)	Nicholls (11:01)
Yone	Yone (12:20)	Tanaka (12:34)	Taniguchi (8:23)	Yone (9:26)	—N/a	Storm (6:06)	Sugiura (15:56)	Yone (11:01)
Storm	Hero (8:05)	Tanaka (7:39)	Taniguchi (8:11)	Nicholls (8:35)	Storm (6:06)	—N/a	Sugiura (12:05)	Nagata (10:50)
Sugiura	Sugiura (12:07)	Tanaka (15:13)	Sugiura (1:57)	Sugiura (13:54)	Sugiura (15:56)	Sugiura (12:05)	—N/a	Nagata (18:09)
Nagata	Nagata (13:28)	Nagata (13:37)	Taniguchi (12:28)	Nicholls (11:01)	Yone (11:01)	Nagata (10:50)	Nagata (18:09)	—N/a

Final
A1	Daisuke Sekimoto	Pin
B1	Takashi Sugiura	19:12

== 2015 ==
The 2015 Global League took place from October 16 to November 8.

Final standings
Block A		Block B	
Naomichi Marufuji	10	Shelton X Benjamin	13
Takashi Sugiura	8	Minoru Suzuki (C)	11
Chris Hero	8	Colt Cabana	8
Masato Tanaka	8	Katsuhiko Nakajima	8
Satoshi Kojima	8	Maybach Taniguchi	6
Davey Boy Smith Jr.	6	Muhammad Yone	6
Lance Archer	6	Mitsuhiro Kitamiya	2
Quiet Storm	2	Takashi Iizuka	1

Block A	Hero	Smith	Archer	Tanaka	Marufuji	Storm	Kojima	Sugiura
Hero	—N/a	Hero (17:10)	Hero (12:17)	Hero (13:49)	Marufuji (12:34)	Storm (9:25)	Hero (10:27)	Sugiura (11:23)
Smith	Hero (17:10)	—N/a	Smith (13:26)	Tanaka (11:58)	Marufuji (13:36)	Smith (8:13)	Kojima (11:29)	Smith (11:28)
Archer	Hero (12:17)	Smith (13:26)	—N/a	Archer (10:16)	Marufuji (11:15)	Archer (9:07)	Kojima (9:41)	Archer (11:48)
Tanaka	Hero (13:49)	Tanaka (11:58)	Archer (10:16)	—N/a	Tanaka (11:59)	Tanaka (6:53)	Tanaka (11:56)	Sugiura (16:17)
Marufuji	Marufuji (12:34)	Marufuji (13:36)	Marufuji (11:15)	Tanaka (11:59)	—N/a	Marufuji (6:38)	Kojima (11:27)	Marufuji (18:18)
Storm	Storm (9:25)	Smith (8:13)	Archer (9:07)	Tanaka (6:53)	Marufuji (6:38)	—N/a	Kojima (7:46)	Sugiura (8:03)
Kojima	Hero (10:27)	Kojima (11:29)	Kojima (9:41)	Tanaka (11:56)	Kojima (11:27)	Kojima (7:46)	—N/a	Sugiura (14:44)
Sugiura	Sugiura (11:23)	Smith (11:28)	Archer (11:48)	Sugiura (16:17)	Marufuji (18:18)	Sugiura (8:03)	Sugiura (14:44)	—N/a
Block B	Cabana	Nakajima	Taniguchi	Suzuki	Kitamiya	Yone	Benjamin	Iizuka
Cabana	—N/a	Cabana (10:31)	Cabana (7:04)	Suzuki (11:16)	Cabana (9:24)	Yone (7:23)	Benjamin (10:06)	Cabana (7:05)
Nakajima	Cabana (10:31)	—N/a	Nakajima (10:44)	Suzuki (15:56)	Nakajima (11:03)	Nakajima (12:48)	Benjamin (13:01)	Nakajima (11:48)
Taniguchi	Cabana (7:04)	Nakajima (10:44)	—N/a	Suzuki (11:04)	Taniguchi (8:33)	Taniguchi (9:30)	Benjamin (12:37)	Taniguchi (11:14)
Suzuki	Suzuki (11:16)	Suzuki (15:56)	Suzuki (11:04)	—N/a	Suzuki (11:07)	Suzuki (14:14)	Draw (30:00)	Draw (7:17)
Kitamiya	Cabana (9:24)	Nakajima (11:03)	Taniguchi (8:33)	Suzuki (11:07)	—N/a	Yone (9:02)	Benjamin (9:02)	Kitamiya (6:08)
Yone	Yone (7:23)	Nakajima (12:48)	Taniguchi (9:30)	Suzuki (14:14)	Yone (9:02)	—N/a	Benjamin (9:31)	Yone (4:06)
Benjamin	Benjamin (10:06)	Benjamin (13:01)	Benjamin (12:37)	Draw (30:00)	Benjamin (9:02)	Benjamin (9:31)	—N/a	Benjamin (7:20)
Iizuka	Cabana (7:05)	Nakajima (11:48)	Taniguchi (11:14)	Draw (7:17)	Kitamiya (6:08)	Yone (4:06)	Benjamin (7:20)	—N/a

Final
A1	Naomichi Marufuji	Pin
B1	Shelton X Benjamin	24:06

== 2016 ==
The 2016 Global League took place from November 3 to 23.

Final standings
Block A		Block B	
Minoru Suzuki	12	Masa Kitamiya	10
Toru Yano	10	Naomichi Marufuji	8
Katsuhiko Nakajima (C)	10	Takashi Sugiura	8
Quiet Storm	8	Go Shiozaki	8
Lance Archer	8	Muhammad Yone	8
Maybach Taniguchi	4	Davey Boy Smith Jr.	8
Akitoshi Saito	2	Alejandro Saez	6
Takashi Iizuka	2	Kaito Kiyomiya	0

Block A	Saito	Nakajima	Archer	Taniguchi	Suzuki	Storm	Iizuka	Yano
Saito	—N/a	Nakajima (11:13)	Archer (7:46)	Taniguchi (9:43)	Suzuki (9:50)	Storm (10:13)	Saito (7:01)	Yano (4:21)
Nakajima	Nakajima (11:13)	—N/a	Nakajima (17:06)	Nakajima (13:13)	Suzuki (16:04)	Nakajima (13:42)	Nakajima (11:56)	Yano (5:13)
Archer	Archer (7:46)	Nakajima (17:06)	—N/a	Archer (10:52)	Suzuki (12:09)	Storm	Archer (8:38)	Archer (4:49)
Taniguchi	Taniguchi (9:43)	Nakajima (13:13)	Archer (10:52)	—N/a	Suzuki (13:01)	Storm (8:28)	Taniguchi (8:19)	Yano (4:30)
Suzuki	Suzuki (9:50)	Suzuki (16:04)	Suzuki (12:09)	Suzuki (13:01)	—N/a	Suzuki (10:34)	Suzuki (7:06)	Yano (6:51)
Storm	Storm (10:13)	Nakajima (13:42)	Storm	Storm (8:28)	Suzuki (10:34)	—N/a	Storm (6:30)	Yano (3:51)
Iizuka	Saito (7:01)	Nakajima (11:56)	Archer (8:38)	Taniguchi (8:19)	Suzuki (7:06)	Storm (6:30)	—N/a	Iizuka (11:21)
Yano	Yano (4:21)	Yano (5:13)	Archer (4:49)	Yano (4:30)	Yano (6:51)	Yano (3:51)	Iizuka (11:21)	—N/a
Block B	Saez	Smith	Shiozaki	Kiyomiya	Kitamiya	Yone	Marufuji	Sugiura
Saez	—N/a	Saez (14:46)	Shiozaki (11:53)	Saez (9:15)	Kitamiya (10:04)	Saez (10:20)	Marufuji (13:26)	Sugiura (12:36)
Smith	Saez (14:46)	—N/a	Smith (13:22)	Smith (11:11)	Kitamiya (13:01)	Yone (11:33)	Smith (15:46)	Smith (16:11)
Shiozaki	Shiozaki (11:53)	Smith (13:22)	—N/a	Shiozaki (9:02)	Shiozaki (19:15)	Shiozaki (15:33)	Marufuji (19:41)	Sugiura (27:10)
Kiyomiya	Saez (9:15)	Smith (11:11)	Shiozaki (9:02)	—N/a	Kitamiya (10:15)	Yone (10:20)	Marufuji (11:55)	Sugiura (12:28)
Kitamiya	Kitamiya (10:04)	Kitamiya (13:01)	Shiozaki (19:15)	Kitamiya (10:15)	—N/a	Yone (13:54)	Kitamiya (17:23)	Kitamiya (13:34)
Yone	Saez (10:20)	Yone (11:33)	Shiozaki (15:33)	Yone (10:20)	Yone (13:54)	—N/a	Marufuji (16:03)	Yone (14:42)
Marufuji	Marufuji (13:26)	Smith (15:46)	Marufuji (19:41)	Marufuji (11:55)	Kitamiya (17:23)	Marufuji (16:03)	—N/a	Sugiura (17:52)
Sugiura	Sugiura (12:36)	Smith (16:11)	Sugiura (27:10)	Sugiura (12:28)	Kitamiya (13:34)	Yone (14:42)	Sugiura (17:52)	—N/a

Final
A1	Minoru Suzuki	Pin
B1	Masa Kitamiya	35:15

== 2017 ==
The 2017 Global League took place from October 14 to November 19.

Final standings
Block A		Block B	
Go Shiozaki	10	Kenoh	11
Masa Kitamiya	10	Masato Tanaka	10
Naomichi Marufuji	9	Katsuhiko Nakajima	9
Mitsuya Nagai	6	Atsushi Kotoge	8
Cody Hall	6	Quiet Storm	6
Muhammad Yone	5	Yuko Miyamoto	6
Maybach Taniguchi	2	Akitoshi Saito	4
Yuji Okabayashi	0	Kazma Sakamoto	2

Block A	Hall	Shiozaki	Kitamiya	Taniguchi	Nagai	Yone	Marufuji	Okabayashi
Hall	—N/a	Shiozaki (11:57)	Kitamiya (09:17)	Hall (12:12)	Nagai (07:59)	Hall (08:42)	Marufuji (10:20)	Hall (forfeit)
Shiozaki	Shiozaki (11:57)	—N/a	Shiozaki (05:19)	DCO (10:25)	Shiozaki (12:23)	Shiozaki (17:10)	Marufuji (16:07)	Shiozaki (forfeit)
Kitamiya	Kitamiya (09:17)	Shiozaki (05:19)	—N/a	DCO (13:39)	Kitamiya (09:30)	Kitamiya (13:20)	Kitamiya (14:37)	Kitamiya (forfeit)
Taniguchi	Hall (12:12)	DCO (10:25)	DCO (13:39)	—N/a	DCO (12:53)	Yone (12:13)	DCO (11:36)	Taniguchi (forfeit)
Nagai	Nagai (07:59)	Shiozaki (12:23)	Kitamiya (09:30)	DCO (12:53)	—N/a	Nagai (11:18)	Marufuji (11:32)	Nagai (forfeit)
Yone	Hall (08:42)	Shiozaki (17:10)	Kitamiya (13:20)	Yone (12:13)	Nagai (11:18)	—N/a	Draw (30:00)	Yone (forfeit)
Marufuji	Marufuji (10:20)	Marufuji (16:07)	Kitamiya (14:37)	DCO (11:36)	Marufuji (11:32)	Draw (30:00)	—N/a	Marufuji (forfeit)
Okabayashi	Hall (forfeit)	Shiozaki (forfeit)	Kitamiya (forfeit)	Taniguchi (forfeit)	Nagai (forfeit)	Yone (forfeit)	Marufuji (forfeit)	—N/a
Block B	Saito	Kotoge	Nakajima	Sakamoto	Kenoh	Tanaka	Storm	Miyamoto
Saito	—N/a	Kotoge (13:30)	Nakajima (10:56)	Saito (06:02)	Kenoh (09:51)	Tanaka (10:17)	Saito (11:32)	Miyamoto (11:30)
Kotoge	Kotoge (13:30)	—N/a	Nakajima (13:03)	Kotoge (02:47)	Kenoh (10:03)	Tanaka (15:10)	Kotoge (14:54)	Kotoge (12:38)
Nakajima	Nakajima (10:56)	Nakajima (13:03)	—N/a	Nakajima (10:16)	Draw (30:00)	Tanaka (13:05)	Storm (11:39)	Nakajima (14:21)
Sakamoto	Saito (06:02)	Kotoge (02:47)	Nakajima (10:16)	—N/a	Kenoh (10:04)	Tanaka (06:24)	Storm (09:33)	Sakamoto (11:32)
Kenoh	Kenoh (09:51)	Kenoh (10:03)	Draw (30:00)	Kenoh (10:04)	—N/a	Kenoh (19:21)	Kenoh (11:03)	Miyamoto (11:39)
Tanaka	Tanaka (10:17)	Tanaka (15:10)	Tanaka (13:05)	Tanaka (06:24)	Kenoh (19:21)	—N/a	Tanaka (12:19)	Miyamoto (11:59)
Storm	Saito (11:32)	Kotoge (14:54)	Storm (11:39)	Storm (09:33)	Kenoh (11:03)	Tanaka (12:19)	—N/a	Storm (10:10)
Miyamoto	Miyamoto (11:30)	Kotoge (12:38)	Nakajima (14:21)	Sakamoto (11:32)	Miyamoto (11:39)	Miyamoto (11:59)	Storm (10:10)	—N/a

Final
A1	Go Shiozaki	Pin
B1	Kenoh	26:24

== 2018 ==
The 2018 Global League took place from October 30 to November 25. Naomichi Marufuji withdrew from the final due to a shoulder injury. A three-way match between Kenoh, Katsuhiko Nakajima, and Kohei Sato determined Marufuji's replacement, which Nakajima won.

Final standings
Block A		Block B	
Naomichi Marufuji	10	Kaito Kiyomiya	8
Kohei Sato	8	Go Shiozaki	8
Kenoh	8	Takashi Sugiura (C)	8
Katsuhiko Nakajima	8	Maybach Taniguchi	8
Quiet Storm	6	Cody Hall	6
Akitoshi Saito	6	Muhammad Yone	6
Masa Kitamiya	6	Kazusada Higuchi	6
Mitsuya Nagai	4	Atsushi Kotoge	6

Block A	Saito	Nakajima	Kenoh	Sato	Kitamiya	Nagai	Marufuji	Storm
Saito	—N/a	Nakajima (12:25)	Kenoh (12:05)	Saito (7:50)	Saito (9:57)	Saito (7:45)	Marufuji (12:06)	Storm (10:24)
Nakajima	Nakajima (12:25)	—N/a	Kenoh (16:48)	Sato (10:38)	Kitamiya (15:20)	Nakajima (6:50)	Nakajima (12:48)	Nakajima (12:23)
Kenoh	Kenoh (12:05)	Kenoh (16:48)	—N/a	Sato (10:48)	Kitamiya (13:50)	Nagai (11:39)	Kenoh (17:54)	Kenoh (10:39)
Sato	Saito (7:50)	Sato (10:38)	Sato (10:48)	—N/a	Sato (15:23)	Nagai (13:07)	Marufuji (10:18)	Sato (10:38)
Kitamiya	Saito (9:57)	Kitamiya (15:20)	Kitamiya (13:50)	Sato (15:23)	—N/a	Kitamiya (8:20)	Marufuji (16:40)	Storm (11:06)
Nagai	Saito (7:45)	Nakajima (6:50)	Nagai (11:39)	Nagai (13:07)	Kitamiya (8:20)	—N/a	Marufuji (12:15)	Storm (8:01)
Marufuji	Marufuji (12:06)	Nakajima (12:48)	Kenoh (17:54)	Marufuji (10:18)	Marufuji (16:40)	Marufuji (12:15)	—N/a	Marufuji (11:17)
Storm	Storm (10:24)	Nakajima (12:23)	Kenoh (10:39)	Sato (10:38)	Storm (11:06)	Storm (8:01)	Marufuji (11:17)	—N/a
Block B	Kotoge	Hall	Shiozaki	Kiyomiya	Higuchi	Taniguchi	Yone	Sugiura
Kotoge	—N/a	Hall (8:37)	Kotoge (13:42)	Kotoge (10:42)	Higuchi (8:02)	Taniguchi (11:19)	Yone (7:36)	Kotoge (6:14)
Hall	Hall (8:37)	—N/a	Shiozaki (10:35)	Hall (5:09)	Higuchi (8:17)	Taniguchi (9:22)	Hall (6:32)	Sugiura (6:10)
Shiozaki	Kotoge (13:42)	Shiozaki (10:35)	—N/a	Kiyomiya (17:38)	Shiozaki (18:20)	Shiozaki (6:49)	Yone (13:44)	Shiozaki (16:28)
Kiyomiya	Kotoge (10:42)	Hall (5:09)	Kiyomiya (17:38)	—N/a	Higuchi (10:25)	Kiyomiya (13:29)	Kiyomiya (11:27)	Kiyomiya (13:30)
Higuchi	Higuchi (8:02)	Higuchi (8:17)	Shiozaki (18:20)	Higuchi (10:25)	—N/a	Taniguchi (9:29)	Yone (7:40)	Sugiura (14:08)
Taniguchi	Taniguchi (11:19)	Taniguchi (9:22)	Shiozaki (6:49)	Kiyomiya (13:29)	Taniguchi (9:29)	—N/a	Taniguchi (9:09)	Sugiura (12:25)
Yone	Yone (7:36)	Hall (6:32)	Yone (13:44)	Kiyomiya (11:27)	Yone (7:40)	Taniguchi (9:09)	—N/a	Sugiura (11:17)
Sugiura	Kotoge (6:14)	Sugiura (6:10)	Shiozaki (16:28)	Kiyomiya (13:30)	Sugiura (14:08)	Sugiura (12:25)	Sugiura (11:17)	—N/a

A-Block Decision			Final
			A4	Katsuhiko Nakajima	Pin
A2	Kohei Sato	Pin	B1	Kaito Kiyomiya	18:34
A3 A4	Kenoh Katsuhiko Nakajima	7:27

== 2019 ==
The 2019 N-1 Victory took place from August 18 to September 16. 10 wrestlers competed in 2 blocks of 5. Prior to the tournament, GHC Heavyweight Champion Kaito Kiyomiya announced he would not participate, but would instead defend the championship against the winner of the tournament at the November 2 Ryogoku event. Dragon Gate wrestler Masaaki Mochizuki and Major League Wrestling wrestlers Alexander Hammerstone and El Hijo de Dr. Wagner Jr. also competed in the tournament.

Final standings
Block A		Block B	
Takashi Sugiura	8	Kenoh	6
Go Shiozaki	4	Shuhei Taniguchi	5
Masa Kitamiya	4	Masaaki Mochizuki	4
Alex Hammerstone	4	Katsuhiko Nakajima	3
Naomichi Marufuji	0	El Hijo de Dr. Wagner Jr.	2

Block A	Marufuji	Sugiura	Shiozaki	Kitamiya	Hammerstone
Marufuji	—N/a	Sugiura (21:38)	Shiozaki (27:54)	Kitamiya (20:36)	Hammerstone (12:35)
Sugiura	Sugiura (21:38)	—N/a	Sugiura (23:10)	Sugiura (17:51)	Sugiura (17:20)
Shiozaki	Shiozaki (27:54)	Sugiura (23:10)	—N/a	Shiozaki (25:23)	Hammerstone (17:10)
Kitamiya	Kitamiya (20:36)	Sugiura (17:51)	Shiozaki (25:23)	—N/a	Kitamiya (17:12)
Hammerstone	Hammerstone (12:35)	Sugiura (17:20)	Hammerstone (17:10)	Kitamiya (17:12)	—N/a
Block B	Nakajima	Taniguchi	Kenoh	Mochizuki	Wagner
Nakajima	—N/a	Draw (30:00)	Kenoh (15:03)	Nakajima (17:22)	Wagner (16:16)
Taniguchi	Draw (30:00)	—N/a	Kenoh (12:51)	Taniguchi (10:39)	Taniguchi (12:55)
Kenoh	Kenoh (15:03)	Kenoh (12:51)	—N/a	Mochizuki (16:53)	Kenoh (14:02)
Mochizuki	Nakajima (17:22)	Taniguchi (10:39)	Mochizuki (16:53)	—N/a	Mochizuki (12:45)
Wagner	Wagner (16:16)	Taniguchi (12:55)	Kenoh (14:02)	Mochizuki (12:45)	—N/a

Final
A1	Takashi Sugiura	Pin
B1	Kenoh	28:40

== 2020 ==
The 2020 N-1 Victory tournament took place from September 18 to October 11. 12 wrestlers competed in 2 blocks of 6. Unlike the previous year, the reigning GHC Heavyweight Champion competed. Dragon Gate's Masaaki Mochizuki competed in the tournament for the second straight year. Also competing was freelancer Kazushi Sakuraba, who was one half of the GHC Tag Team Champions at the time (along with fellow entrant Takashi Sugiura).

Final standings
Block A		Block B	
Kaito Kiyomiya	7	Katsuhiko Nakajima	8
Go Shiozaki (C)	6	Takashi Sugiura	7
Masaaki Mochizuki	5	Kenoh	6
Manabu Soya	4	Naomichi Marufuji	5
Kazushi Sakuraba	4	Shuhei Taniguchi	4
Masa Kitamiya	4	Yoshiki Inamura	0

Block A	Kiyomiya	Shiozaki	Soya	Mochizuki	Kitamiya	Sakuraba
Kiyomiya	—N/a	Kiyomiya (24:07)	Kiyomiya (21:55)	Draw (30:00)	Kitamiya (14:32)	Kiyomiya (9:47)
Shiozaki	Kiyomiya (24:07)	—N/a	Shiozaki (16:54)	Mochizuki (16:21)	Shiozaki (20:00)	Shiozaki (8:35)
Soya	Kiyomiya (21:55)	Shiozaki (16:54)	—N/a	Mochizuki (13:14)	Soya (12:56)	Soya (5:57)
Mochizuki	Draw (30:00)	Mochizuki (16:21)	Mochizuki (13:14)	—N/a	Kitamiya (9:23)	Sakuraba (8:28)
Kitamiya	Kitamiya (14:32)	Shiozaki (20:00)	Soya (12:56)	Kitamiya (9:23)	—N/a	Sakuraba (2:29)
Sakuraba	Kiyomiya (9:47)	Shiozaki (8:35)	Soya (5:57)	Sakuraba (8:28)	Sakuraba (2:29)	—N/a
Block B	Kenoh	Nakajima	Marufuji	Taniguchi	Sugiura	Inamura
Kenoh	—N/a	Nakajima (17:19)	Kenoh (15:05)	Kenoh (9:40)	Sugiura (16:04)	Kenoh (10:26)
Nakajima	Nakajima (17:19)	—N/a	Nakajima (16:25)	Taniguchi (14:42)	Nakajima (17:42)	Nakajima (11:49)
Marufuji	Kenoh (15:05)	Nakajima (16:25)	—N/a	Marufuji (18:21)	Draw (30:00)	Marufuji (12:23)
Taniguchi	Kenoh (9:40)	Taniguchi (14:42)	Marufuji (18:21)	—N/a	Sugiura (21:57)	Taniguchi (4:36)
Sugiura	Sugiura (16:04)	Nakajima (17:42)	Draw (30:00)	Sugiura (21:57)	—N/a	Sugiura (9:11)
Inamura	Kenoh (10:26)	Nakajima (11:49)	Marufuji (12:23)	Taniguchi (4:36)	Sugiura (9:11)	—N/a

Final
A1	Kaito Kiyomiya	Pin
B1	Katsuhiko Nakajima	25:24

== 2021 ==
N-1 Victory 2021
- Promotional poster featuring all the participants
- Promotion: Pro Wrestling Noah
- Date: September 12–October 2, 2021
- City: Various; Final: Tokyo
- Venue: Various; Final: Korakuen Hall
- Attendance: Highest: Finals (713)

Pay-per-view chronology
← Previous; Cross Over in Hiroshima 2021	Next → Grand Square 2021

N-1 Victory chronology
← Previous; 2020	Next → 2022

The 2021 N-1 Victory tournament took place from September 12 to October 3. 16 wrestlers competed in 4 blocks of 4, where the winners of each block advanced to the semi-finals. The semi-finals were single elimination matches with the winners facing each other in the final later in the same night. Katsuhiko Nakajima, who won the tournament, also received a GHC Heavyweight Championship match against then-champion Naomichi Marufuji at Grand Square 2021 in Osaka on October 10.

Final standings
Block A		Block B		Block C		Block D	
Kaito Kiyomiya	5	Kenoh	4	Katsuhiko Nakajima	4	Masakatsu Funaki	6
Keiji Mutoh	4	Masaaki Mochizuki	4	Kazushi Sakuraba	3	Kazuyuki Fujita	4
Takashi Sugiura	3	Daiki Inaba	2	Masato Tanaka	3	Masa Kitamiya	2
Manabu Soya	0	Kendo Kashin	2	Kotaro Suzuki	2	Akitoshi Saito	0

Tournament overview
Block A	Sugiura	Kiyomiya	Soya	Mutoh
Sugiura	—N/a	Kiyomiya (21:15)	Sugiura (10:19)	Draw (30:00)
Kiyomiya	Kiyomiya (21:15)	—N/a	Kiyomiya (25:07)	Draw (30:00)
Soya	Sugiura (10:19)	Kiyomiya (25:07)	—N/a	Mutoh (17:37)
Mutoh	Draw (30:00)	Draw (30:00)	Mutoh (17:37)	—N/a
Block B	Kenoh	Inaba	Mochizuki	Kashin
Kenoh	—N/a	Kenoh (14:59)	Kenoh (16:30)	Kashin (12:46)
Inaba	Kenoh (14:59)	—N/a	Mochizuki (12:39)	Inaba (7:07)
Mochizuki	Kenoh (16:30)	Mochizuki (12:39)	—N/a	Mochizuki (9:28)
Kashin	Kashin (12:46)	Inaba (7:07)	Mochizuki (9:28)	—N/a
Block C	Nakajima	Sakuraba	Suzuki	Tanaka
Nakajima	—N/a	Nakajima (12:33)	Nakajima (18:31)	Tanaka (14:08)
Sakuraba	Nakajima (12:33)	—N/a	Sakuraba (15:02)	Draw (30:00)
Suzuki	Nakajima (18:31)	Sakuraba (15:02)	—N/a	Suzuki (5:26)
Tanaka	Tanaka (14:08)	Draw (30:00)	Suzuki (5:26)	—N/a
Block D	Kitamiya	Saito	Funaki	Fujita
Kitamiya	—N/a	Kitamiya (7:58)	Funaki (10:54)	Fujita (9:29)
Saito	Kitamiya (7:58)	—N/a	Funaki (12:53)	Fujita (13:12)
Funaki	Funaki (10:54)	Funaki (12:53)	—N/a	Funaki (5:05)
Fujita	Fujita (9:29)	Fujita (13:12)	Funaki (5:05)	—N/a

Semifinals
A1	Kaito Kiyomiya	Pin
B1	Kenoh	15:35
C1	Katsuhiko Nakajima	Pin
D1	Masakatsu Funaki	8:38

Final
B1	Kenoh	Pin
C1	Katsuhiko Nakajima	20:00

== 2022 ==
N-1 Victory 2022
- Promotional poster for the final event of the tournament, featuring all the participants
- Promotion: Pro Wrestling Noah
- Date: August 11–September 3, 2022
- City: Various; Final: Osaka
- Venue: Various; Final: Osaka Prefectural Gymnasium
- Attendance: Highest: Finals (2,988)

Pay-per-view chronology
← Previous; Departure 2022	Next → Grand Ship In Nagoya 2022

N-1 Victory chronology
← Previous; 2021	Next → 2023

The 2022 edition took place between August 11 and September 3, with the final at Osaka Prefectural Gymnasium. The participants and matches were announced on July 17. Timothy Thatcher withdrew from the tournament due to visa issues. Kinya Okada defeated Yoshiki Inamura to take Thatcher's spot in the N-1.

Final standings
Block A		Block B	
Hideki Suzuki	11	Kaito Kiyomiya	10
Kazuyuki Fujita	10	Katsuhiko Nakajima	10
Kenoh (C)	9	Masakatsu Funaki	8
Go Shiozaki	8	Takashi Sugiura	8
El Hijo de Dr. Wagner Jr.	6	Satoshi Kojima	8
Masato Tanaka	6	Jack Morris	6
Masaaki Mochizuki	4	Masa Kitamiya	6
Anthony Greene	2	Kinya Okada	0

Block A	Kenoh	Fujita	Shiozaki	Tanaka	Mochizuki	Suzuki	Wagner	Greene
Kenoh	—N/a	Fujita (19:04)	Kenoh (20:00)	Tanaka (19:01)	Kenoh (13:32)	Draw (30:00)	Kenoh (15:03)	Kenoh (11:14)
Fujita	Fujita (19:04)	—N/a	Fujita (20:46)	Tanaka (20:56)	Fujita (8:43)	Fujita (19:05)	Wagner (9:23)	Fujita (4:59)
Shiozaki	Kenoh (20:00)	Fujita (20:46)	—N/a	Shiozaki (15:54)	Shiozaki (14:22)	Suzuki (15:13)	Shiozaki (15:15)	Shiozaki (9:35)
Tanaka	Tanaka (19:01)	Tanaka (20:56)	Shiozaki (15:54)	—N/a	Mochizuki (13:43)	Suzuki (15:24)	Wagner (11:37)	Tanaka (11:21)
Mochizuki	Kenoh (13:32)	Fujita (8:43)	Shiozaki (14:22)	Mochizuki (13:43)	—N/a	Suzuki (14:35)	Wagner (13:18)	Mochizuki (9:46)
Suzuki	Draw (30:00)	Fujita (19:05)	Suzuki (15:13)	Suzuki (15:24)	Suzuki (14:35)	—N/a	Suzuki (12:46)	Suzuki (9:00)
Wagner	Kenoh (15:03)	Wagner (9:23)	Shiozaki (15:15)	Wagner (11:37)	Wagner (13:18)	Suzuki (12:46)	—N/a	Greene (12:12)
Greene	Kenoh (11:14)	Fujita (4:59)	Shiozaki (9:35)	Tanaka (11:21)	Mochizuki (9:46)	Suzuki (9:00)	Greene (12:12)	—N/a
Block B	Funaki	Kiyomiya	Nakajima	Sugiura	Kitamiya	Kojima	Okada	Morris
Funaki	—N/a	Kiyomiya (13:49)	Funaki (22:26)	Funaki (0:57)	Kitamiya (9:03)	Kojima (10:11)	Funaki (7:49)	Funaki (8:44)
Kiyomiya	Kiyomiya (13:49)	—N/a	Kiyomiya (17:45)	Kiyomiya (19:30)	Kitamiya (18:54)	Kiyomiya (17:06)	Kiyomiya (9:59)	Morris (11:50)
Nakajima	Funaki (22:26)	Kiyomiya (17:45)	—N/a	Nakajima (16:35)	Nakajima (10:36)	Nakajima (24:44)	Nakajima (3:17)	Nakajima (13:41)
Sugiura	Funaki (0:57)	Kiyomiya (19:30)	Nakajima (16:35)	—N/a	Sugiura (10:26)	Sugiura (16:54)	Sugiura (6:43)	Sugiura (16:33)
Kitamiya	Kitamiya (9:03)	Kitamiya (18:54)	Nakajima (10:36)	Sugiura (10:26)	—N/a	Kojima (12:36)	Kitamiya (6:09)	Morris (11:00)
Kojima	Kojima (10:11)	Kiyomiya (17:06)	Nakajima (24:44)	Sugiura (16:54)	Kojima (12:36)	—N/a	Kojima (8:50)	Kojima (12:48)
Okada	Funaki (7:49)	Kiyomiya (9:59)	Nakajima (3:17)	Sugiura (6:43)	Kitamiya (6:09)	Kojima (8:50)	—N/a	Morris (11:06)
Morris	Funaki (8:44)	Morris (11:50)	Nakajima (13:41)	Sugiura (16:33)	Morris (11:00)	Kojima (12:48)	Morris (11:06)	—N/a

Final
A1	Hideki Suzuki	Pin
B1	Kaito Kiyomiya	33:23

== 2023 ==
N-1 Victory 2023
- Promotional poster for the final event of the tournament, featuring all the participants
- Promotion: Pro Wrestling Noah
- Date: August 6–September 3, 2023
- City: Various; Final: Osaka
- Venue: Various; Final: Osaka Prefectural Gymnasium
- Attendance: Highest: Finals (2,121)

Pay-per-view chronology
← Previous; Great Journey in Nagoya 2023	Next → Grand Ship in Nagoya 2023

N-1 Victory chronology
← Previous; 2022	Next → —

The 2023 edition took place between August 6 and September 3, with the final at Osaka Prefectural Gymnasium. The participants and matches were announced on June 22. Sixteen wrestlers competed in the tournament with special guests including All Japan Pro Wrestling's Yuma Anzai and Dragon Gate's Yuki Yoshioka competing in this year's tournament. On August 19, it was announced that Daiki Inaba would be absent for the remainder of the tournament, due to injury, leading him to forfeit the remainder of their matches.

Final standings
Block A		Block B	
Kenoh	10	Go Shiozaki	9
Jake Lee (C)	10	Manabu Soya	9
Jack Morris	9	Katsuhiko Nakajima	8
Yuki Yoshioka	8	Lance Anoa'i	8
Timothy Thatcher	8	El Hijo del Dr. Wagner Jr.	8
Masa Kitamiya	7	Saxon Huxley	6
Adam Brooks	4	Daiki Inaba	4
Yoshiki Inamura	0	Yuma Anzai	4

Block A	Lee	Kenoh	Kitamiya	Morris	Inamura	Thatcher	Brooks	Yoshioka
Lee	—N/a	Kenoh (22:38)	Draw (30:00)	Draw (30:00)	Lee (10:15)	Lee (20:04)	Lee (10:24)	Lee (16:08)
Kenoh	Kenoh (22:38)	—N/a	Kenoh (15:41)	Morris (15:20)	Kenoh (28:34)	Kenoh (13:47)	Brooks (14:16)	Kenoh (20:25)
Kitamiya	Draw (30:00)	Kenoh (15:41)	—N/a	Kitamiya (10:20)	Kitamiya (14:15)	Thatcher (10:26)	Kitamiya (11:02)	Yoshioka (12:41)
Morris	Draw (30:00)	Morris (15:20)	Kitamiya (10:20)	—N/a	Morris (13:51)	Thatcher (11:59)	Morris (10:11)	Morris (9:58)
Inamura	Lee (10:15)	Kenoh (28:34)	Kitamiya (14:15)	Morris (13:51)	—N/a	Thatcher (13:12)	Brooks (7:58)	Yoshioka (7:26)
Thatcher	Lee (20:04)	Kenoh (13:47)	Thatcher (10:26)	Thatcher (11:59)	Thatcher (13:12)	—N/a	Thatcher (9:47)	Yoshioka (8:24)
Brooks	Lee (10:24)	Brooks (14:16)	Kitamiya (11:02)	Morris (10:11)	Brooks (7:58)	Thatcher (9:47)	—N/a	Yoshioka (9:46)
Yoshioka	Lee (16:08)	Kenoh (20:25)	Yoshioka (12:41)	Morris (9:58)	Yoshioka (7:26)	Yoshioka (8:24)	Yoshioka (9:46)	—N/a
Block B	Shiozaki	Nakajima	Wagner	Soya	Inaba	Huxley	Anoa'i	Anzai
Shiozaki	—N/a	Shiozaki (14:53)	Wagner (24:28)	Draw (30:00)	Shiozaki (forfeit)	Shiozaki (9:54)	Anoa'i (12:14)	Shiozaki (21:51)
Nakajima	Shiozaki (14:53)	—N/a	Nakajima (15:00)	Soya (14:40)	Nakajima (13:35)	Huxley (12:37)	Nakajima (10:36)	Nakajima (10:33)
Wagner	Wagner (24:28)	Nakajima (15:00)	—N/a	Soya (12:07)	Wagner (12:47)	Wagner (10:04)	Anoa'i (10:56)	Wagner (10:30)
Soya	Draw (30:00)	Soya (14:40)	Soya (12:07)	—N/a	Inaba (13:50)	Soya (12:00)	Soya (12:35)	Anzai (13:14)
Inaba	Shiozaki (forfeit)	Nakajima (13:35)	Wagner (12:47)	Inaba (13:50)	—N/a	Inaba (7:36)	Anoa'i (forfeit)	Anzai (forfeit)
Huxley	Shiozaki (9:54)	Huxley (12:37)	Wagner (10:04)	Soya (12:00)	Inaba (7:36)	—N/a	Huxley (7:13)	Huxley (9:28)
Anoa'i	Anoa'i (12:14)	Nakajima (10:36)	Anoa'i (10:56)	Soya (12:35)	Anoa'i (forfeit)	Huxley (7:13)	—N/a	Anoa'i (8:22)
Anzai	Shiozaki (21:51)	Nakajima (10:33)	Wagner (10:30)	Anzai (13:14)	Anzai (forfeit)	Huxley (9:28)	Anoa'i (8:22)	—N/a

B-Block Decision			Final
			A1	Kenoh	Pin
B1	Go Shiozaki	Pin	B1	Go Shiozaki	32:48
B2	Manabu Soya	22:33

== 2024 ==
N-1 Victory 2024
- Promotional poster of the event
- Promotion: Pro Wrestling Noah
- Date: August 4–September 1, 2024
- City: Various; Final: Osaka
- Venue: Various; Final: Osaka Prefectural Gymnasium
- Attendance: Highest: Finals (1,537)
- Tagline: "Summer that will set the world on fire"

Pay-per-view chronology
← Previous; Destination 2024	Next → Star Navigation in Tokyo 2024

N-1 Victory chronology
← Previous; 2023	Next → 2025

The 2024 edition took place between August 4 and September 1, with the final at Osaka Prefectural Gymnasium. The participants and matches were announced on July 13. Sixteen wrestlers with special guests including New Japan Pro-Wrestling's Ryohei Oiwa, Dragon Gate's Luis Mante, and NXT wrestlers Josh Briggs and Tavion Heights will be competing in this year's tournament. On July 31, it was announced that Go Shiozaki was withdrawing from the tournament due to injury with Atsushi Kotoge being announced as his replacement on August 3rd. However, on August 10, it was announced that Kotoge would be absent for the remainder of the tournament, due to injury, leading him to forfeit the remainder of his matches. On August 11, it was announced that El Hijo de Dr. Wagner Jr. would be absent the remainder of the tournament due to injury, leading him to forfeit the remainder of his matches.

Kaito Kiyomiya, the reigning GHC Heavyweight Champion, defeated Kenoh in the final, making his third successful defense in his third reign, becoming the first wrestler to win the N-1 Victory while holding the GHC Heavyweight Championship and the first to win three editions.

Final standings
Block A		Block B	
Kaito Kiyomiya (C)	10	Kenoh	11
Josh Briggs	10	Manabu Soya	10
Jack Morris	8	Titus Alexander	8
Luis Mante	8	Tavion Heights	8
Masa Kitamiya	7	Ulka Sasaki	6
Ryohei Oiwa	7	Yoshiki Inamura	6
Dragon Bane	6	Alpha Wolf	5
Atsushi Kotoge (Withdrawn)	0	El Hijo de Dr. Wagner Jr. (Withdrawn)	2

Block A	Kiyomiya	Kotoge	Kitamiya	Oiwa	Morris	Bane	Mante	Briggs
Kiyomiya	—N/a	Kiyomiya (forfeit)	Draw (30:00)	Draw (30:00)	Kiyomiya (23:48)	Kiyomiya (12:45)	Mante (19:20)	Kiyomiya (19:54)
Kotoge	Kiyomiya (forfeit)	—N/a	Kitamiya (forfeit)	Oiwa (forfeit)	Morris (forfeit)	Bane (11:44)	Mante (forfeit)	Briggs (5:47)
Kitamiya	Draw (30:00)	Kitamiya (forfeit)	—N/a	Kitamiya (12:17)	Kitamiya (15:52)	Bane (12:11)	Mante (12:42)	Briggs (11:37)
Oiwa	Draw (30:00)	Oiwa (forfeit)	Kitamiya (12:17)	—N/a	Oiwa (16:39)	Oiwa (11:59)	Mante (14:50)	Briggs (9:27)
Morris	Kiyomiya (23:48)	Morris (forfeit)	Kitamiya (15:52)	Oiwa (16:39)	—N/a	Morris (10:51)	Morris (11:59)	Morris (11:25)
Bane	Kiyomiya (12:45)	Bane (11:44)	Bane (12:11)	Oiwa (11:59)	Morris (10:51)	—N/a	Bane (12:48)	Briggs (9:03)
Mante	Mante (19:20)	Mante (forfeit)	Mante (12:42)	Mante (14:50)	Morris (11:59)	Bane (12:48)	—N/a	Briggs (9:40)
Briggs	Kiyomiya (19:54)	Briggs (5:47)	Briggs (11:37)	Briggs (9:27)	Morris (11:25)	Briggs (9:03)	Briggs (9:40)	—N/a
Block B	Kenoh	Soya	Sasaki	Inamura	Wagner	Wolf	Alexander	Heights
Kenoh	—N/a	Kenoh (19:19)	Kenoh (11:25)	Kenoh (17:29)	Kenoh (forfeit)	Draw (10:22)	Kenoh (16:26)	Heights (12:06)
Soya	Kenoh (19:19)	—N/a	Soya (12:54)	Inamura (20:19)	Soya (forfeit)	Soya (9:16)	Soya (13:49)	Soya (12:22)
Sasaki	Kenoh (11:25)	Soya (12:54)	—N/a	Sasaki (11:35)	Wagner (11:14)	Sasaki (11:27)	Alexander (10:58)	Sasaki (9:15)
Inamura	Kenoh (17:29)	Inamura (20:19)	Sasaki (11:35)	—N/a	Inamura (21:09)	Inamura (10:43)	Alexander (18:06)	Heights (12:41)
Wagner	Kenoh (forfeit)	Soya (forfeit)	Wagner (11:14)	Inamura (21:09)	—N/a	Wolf (14:14)	Alexander (forfeit)	Heights (forfeit)
Wolf	Draw (10:22)	Soya (9:16)	Sasaki (11:27)	Inamura (10:43)	Wolf (14:14)	—N/a	Wolf (11:29))	Heights (10:12)
Alexander	Kenoh (16:26)	Soya (13:49)	Alexander (10:58)	Alexander (18:06)	Alexander (forfeit)	Wolf (11:29)	—N/a	Alexander (9:21)
Heights	Heights (12:06)	Soya (12:22)	Sasaki (9:15)	Heights (12:41)	Heights (forfeit)	Heights (10:12)	Alexander (9:21)	—N/a

Final
A1	Kaito Kiyomiya (C)	Pin
B1	Kenoh	25:09

== 2025 ==
N-1 Victory 2025
- Promotional poster of the event
- Promotion: Pro Wrestling Noah
- Date: September 8–23, 2025
- City: Various; Final: Tokyo
- Venue: Various; Final: Korakuen Hall

Pay-per-view chronology
← Previous; New Departure 2025	Next → Noah Wrestle Odyssey 2025

N-1 Victory chronology
← Previous; 2024	Next → 2026

The 2025 edition took place between September 8 and 23, 2025, with the final at Korakuen Hall. The participants and matches were announced on August 16. The field featured sixteen wrestlers, including Ricky Knight Jr. from Revolution Pro Wrestling (RevPro).

During his first match in the tournament against Naomichi Marufuji, Ozawa would injure his left foot. This caused him to withdraw from the tournament and forfeit the rest of his matches.

Current standings
Block A		Block B	
Masa Kitamiya	10	Jack Morris	11
Kazuyuki Fujita	8	Galeno	11
Kenta (C)	8	Ricky Knight Jr.	10
Kaito Kiyomiya	8	Naomichi Marufuji	10
Tetsuya Endo	8	Kenoh	8
Manabu Soya	6	Daiki Inaba	4
Ulka Sasaki	4	Harutoki	2
Daga	4	Ozawa (Withdrawn)	0

Block A	Kenta	Kiyomiya	Soya	Sasaki	Fujita	Endo	Kitamiya	Daga
Kenta	—N/a	Kiyomiya (13:49)	Soya (12:06)	Kenta (11:53)	Kenta (13:28)	Endo (15:02)	Kenta (15:12)	Kenta (13:34)
Kiyomiya	Kiyomiya (13:49)	—N/a	Kiyomiya (13:54)	Kiyomiya (11:30)	Fujita (8:50)	Kiyomiya (14:26)	Kitamiya (11:33)	Daga (10:27)
Soya	Soya (12:06)	Kiyomiya (13:54)	—N/a	Soya (7:08)	Fujita (14:23)	Endo (12:45)	Kitamiya (8:20)	Soya (9:34)
Sasaki	Kenta (11:53)	Kiyomiya (11:30)	Soya (7:08)	—N/a	Fujita (4:44)	Endo (10:30)	Sasaki (8:53)	Sasaki (10:44)
Fujita	Kenta (13:28)	Fujita (8:50)	Fujita (14:23)	Fujita (4:44)	—N/a	Endo (7:00)	Kitamiya (12:44)	Fujita (3:52)
Endo	Endo (15:02)	Kiyomiya (14:26)	Endo (12:45)	Endo (10:30)	Endo (7:00)	—N/a	Kitamiya (11:48)	Daga (10:28)
Kitamiya	Kenta (15:12)	Kitamiya (11:33)	Kitamiya (8:20)	Sasaki (8:53)	Kitamiya (12:44)	Kitamiya (11:48)	—N/a	Kitamiya (9:44)
Daga	Kenta (13:34)	Daga (10:27)	Soya (9:34)	Sasaki (10:44)	Fujita (3:52)	Daga (10:28)	Kitamiya (9:44)	—N/a
Block B	Galeno	Marufuji	Kenoh	Inaba	Morris	Harutoki	Knight	Ozawa
Galeno	—N/a	Marufuji (8:56)	Galeno (6:14)	Galeno (11:47)	Draw (13:50)	Galeno (7:40)	Galeno (11:04)	Galeno (Forfeit)
Marufuji	Marufuji (8:56)	—N/a	Marufuji (14:35)	Marufuji (9:00)	Morris (11:04)	Marufuji (11:04)	Knight (9:44)	Marufuji (7:33)
Kenoh	Galeno (6:14)	Marufuji (14:35)	—N/a	Kenoh (12:58)	Kenoh (11:57)	Kenoh (8:38)	Knight (11:11)	Kenoh (Forfeit)
Inaba	Galeno (11:47)	Marufuji (9:00)	Kenoh (12:58)	—N/a	Morris (5:34)	Inaba (10:21)	Knight (9:30)	Inaba (Forfeit)
Morris	Draw (13:50)	Morris (11:04)	Kenoh (11:57)	Morris (5:34)	—N/a	Morris (10:22)	Morris (10:23)	Morris (Forfeit)
Harutoki	Galeno (7:40)	Marufuji (11:04)	Kenoh (8:38)	Inaba (10:21)	Morris (10:22)	—N/a	Knight (6:15)	Harutoki (Forfeit)
Knight	Galeno (11:04)	Knight (9:44)	Knight (11:11)	Knight (9:30)	Morris (10:23)	Knight (6:15)	—N/a	Knight (Forfeit)
Ozawa	Galeno (Forfeit)	Marufuji (7:33)	Kenoh (Forfeit)	Inaba (Forfeit)	Morris (Forfeit)	Harutoki (Forfeit)	Knight (Forfeit)	—N/a

B-Block Decision			Final
			A1	Masa Kitamiya	Sub
B1	Jack Morris	Pin	B1	Jack Morris	22:40
B2	Galeno	10:26

== 2026 ==
N-1 Victory 2026
- Promotional poster of the event
- Promotion: Pro Wrestling Noah
- Date: September 12–October 4, 2026
- City: Various; Final: Tokyo
- Venue: Various; Final: Yoyogi National Stadium

Pay-per-view chronology
← Previous; Legacy Rise	Next → —

N-1 Victory chronology
← Previous; 2025	Next → —

The 2026 edition took place between September 12 and October 4, 2026, with the final at Korakuen Hall. The participants and matches were announced on August 10. LY Corporation was the presenting sponsor for the tournament. This year marked the tournament debuts of Kouga and former WWE NXT wrestler Chen, as well as the first appearance by Shane Haste in the tournament since 2014.

Final standings
Block A		Block B	
Kaito Kiyomiya	11	Ozawa	10
Shane Haste	10	Kenoh	8
Yoshiki Inamura	9	Tetsuya Endo	8
Alpha Wolf	8	Masa Kitamiya	8
Takashi Sugiura	6	Titus Alexander	8
Kazuyuki Fujita	6	Kenta	6
Chen	4	Manabu Soya	4
Yuki Iino	2	Kouga	4

Block A	Kiyomiya	Inamura	Haste	Iino	Fujita	Sugiura	Wolf	Chen
Kiyomiya	—N/a	Draw (30:00)	Kiyomiya (18:24)	Iino (10:23)	Kiyomiya (14:04)	Kiyomiya (12:32)	Kiyomiya (12:16)	Kiyomiya (17:09)
Inamura	Draw (30:00)	—N/a	Inamura (17:57)	Inamura (10:42)	Fujita (11:08)	Inamura (9:51)	Wolf (13:31)	Inamura (11:05)
Haste	Kiyomiya (18:24)	Inamura (17:57)	—N/a	Haste (12:25)	Haste (10:48)	Haste (15:39)	Haste (16:34)	Haste (12:19)
Iino	Iino (10:23)	Inamura (10:42)	Haste (12:25)	—N/a	Fujita (3:58)	Sugiura (9:45)	Wolf (11:17)	Chen (9:42)
Fujita	Kiyomiya (14:04)	Fujita (11:08)	Haste (10:48)	Fujita (3:58)	-	Sugiura (9:51)	Wolf (5:57)	Fujita (9:12)
Sugiura	Kiyomiya (12:32)	Inamura (9:51)	Haste (15:39)	Sugiura (9:45)	Sugiura (9:51)	—N/a	Sugiura (9:23)	Chen (10:30)
Wolf	Kiyomiya (12:16)	Wolf (13:31)	Haste (16:34)	Wolf (11:17)	Wolf (5:57)	Sugiura (9:23)	—N/a	Wolf (10:16)
Chen	Kiyomiya (17:09)	Inamura (11:05)	Haste (12:19)	Chen (9:42)	Fujita (9:12)	Chen (10:30)	Wolf (10:16)	—N/a
Block B	Kenta	Kenoh	Kouga	Soya	Endo	Ozawa	Kitamiya	Alexander
Kenta	—N/a	Kenoh (23:52)	Kenta (6:27)	Soya (11:21)	Endo (17:16)	Ozawa (13:09)	Kenta (11:27)	Kenta (10:27)
Kenoh	Kenoh (23:52)	—N/a	Kenoh (12:35)	Kenoh (10:15)	Endo (2:29)	Kenoh (18:57)	Kitamiya (16:19)	Alexander (14:49)
Kouga	Kenta (6:27)	Kenoh (12:35)	—N/a	Kouga (10:04)	Endo (20:30)	Ozawa (19:36)	Kouga (9:38)	Alexander (10:36)
Soya	Soya (11:21)	Kenoh (10:15)	Kouga (10:04)	—N/a	Endo (13:47)	Soya (9:28)	Kitamiya (14:57)	Alexander (12:05)
Endo	Endo (17:16)	Endo (2:29)	Endo (20:30)	Endo (13:47)	—N/a	Ozawa (5:43)	Kitamiya (6:48)	Alexander (9:04)
Ozawa	Ozawa (13:09)	Kenoh (18:57)	Ozawa (19:36)	Soya (9:28)	Ozawa (5:43)	—N/a	Ozawa (11:25)	Ozawa (10:21)
Kitamiya	Kenta (11:27)	Kitamiya (16:19)	Kouga (9:38)	Kitamiya (14:57)	Kitamiya (6:48)	Ozawa (11:25)	—N/a	Kitamiya (8:42)
Alexander	Kenta (10:27)	Alexander (14:49)	Alexander (10:36)	Alexander (12:05)	Alexander (9:04)	Ozawa (10:21)	Kitamiya (8:42)	—N/a

Final
A1	Kaito Kiyomiya	23:22
B1	Ozawa	Pin

== See also ==
- Champion Carnival
- G1 Climax
- Fire Festival
- Ikkitousen Strong Climb
- D-Oh Grand Prix
- King of Gate
- Continental Classic
