= Quiet Storm (wrestler) =

American professional wrestler (born 1983)

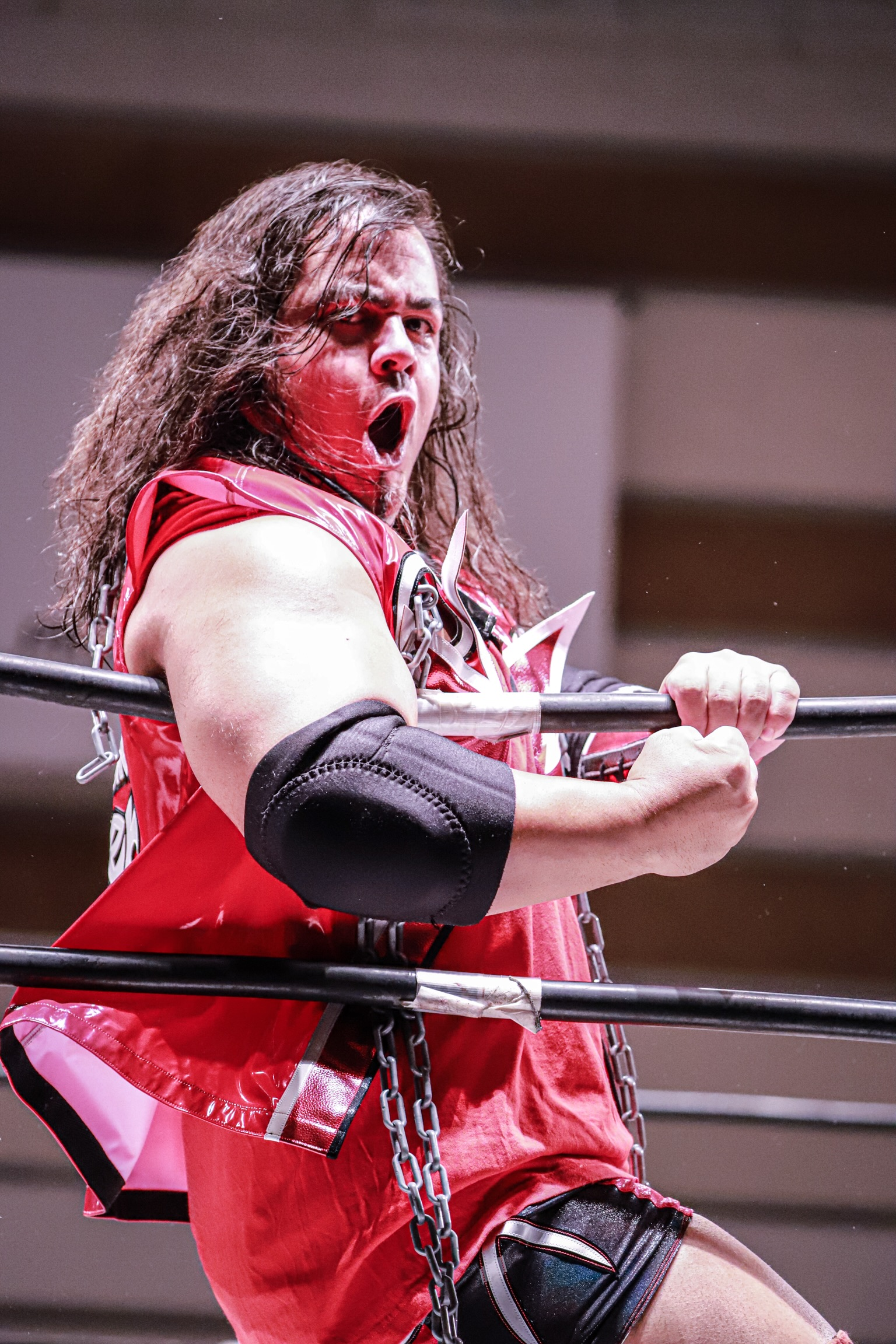
- Quiet Storm in September 2022

Personal information
- Born: November 20, 1983 (age 42) New York City, New York, USA

Professional wrestling career
- Ring name(s): Boso Boy Left; Summer Santa; Quiet Storm
- Billed height: 1.70 m (5 ft 7 in)
- Billed weight: 110 kg (243 lb)
- Trained by: Mikey Whipwreck; Taka Michinoku
- Debut: 1998

Quiet Storm (born November 20, 1983) is an American professional wrestler, currently working as a freelancer and is best known for his time with the Japanese professional wrestling promotions Kaientai Dojo and Pro Wrestling Noah.

== Professional wrestling career ==
=== Independent circuit (2000–present) ===
After competing as an amateur beginning with 1998, Storm made his professional wrestling debut in the year of 2000, and began working for Combat Zone Wrestling (CZW), where at CZW Take One, show from June 8, 2001, he teamed up with Chris Divine as Divine Storm and Brian XL, falling short to The Spanish Announce Team (Joel Maximo, Jose Maximo and Amazing Red) in a six-man tag team match. Storm also worked for Ring Of Honor (ROH), taking part in the ROH Night Of Appreciation on April 27, 2002, where he teamed up with Chris Divine to defeat Christian York and Joey Matthews. While in MCW Pro Wrestling, Storm participated in a 20-man stampede battle royal at MCW Tribute To The Legends from May 22, 2002, competing against other popular superstars such as Adam Flash, Julio Dinero, Gillberg and Danny Doring. On January 21, 2006, Storm participated at an event promoted by National Wrestling Alliance (NWA)'s satellite promotion NWA Cyberspace where he won a battle royal. The most notable activity of his in Jersey All Pro Wrestling (JAPW) was a 7-man gauntlet match for the JAPW Light Heavyweight Championship which took place at JAPW Wild Card II on January 7, 2006, also involving the winner Teddy Hart, Azrieal, Archadia, Grim Reefer, Javi-Air and Matt Cross. He once activated in the Lucha libre scene, competing at Lucha Libre World Cup 2017, an event promoted by Lucha Libre AAA Worldwide (AAA) and Lucha Underground on the second night from October 10, where he teamed up with Cody Hall representing Noah, falling short to Team Mexico AAA (Pagano and Psycho Clown). He made an appearance for Wrestle-1 (W-1) at W-1 WRESTLE-1 Tour 2017 Flashing Summer from August 28, where he teamed up with Yuji Hino and fought Daisuke Sekimoto and Manabu Soya in a time-limit draw.

=== Japan ===
==== New Japan Pro-Wrestling (2016) ====
Storm participated in New Japan Pro-Wrestling (NJPW)'s Lion's Gate Project, making his first appearance on the first edition of the event from February 25, 2016, where he fell short to Manabu Nakanishi. He also competed in the second project from May 19, where he teamed up with fellow Noah wrestlers Katsuhiko Nakajima, Masa Kitamiya and Maybach Taniguchi in a losing effort to NJPW's Hiroyoshi Tenzan, Manabu Nakanishi, Satoshi Kojima and Yuji Nagata. He marked his last appearance at Lion's Gate Project 3, where he picked up a win against Henare.

==== Pro Wrestling Noah (2014–2020) ====
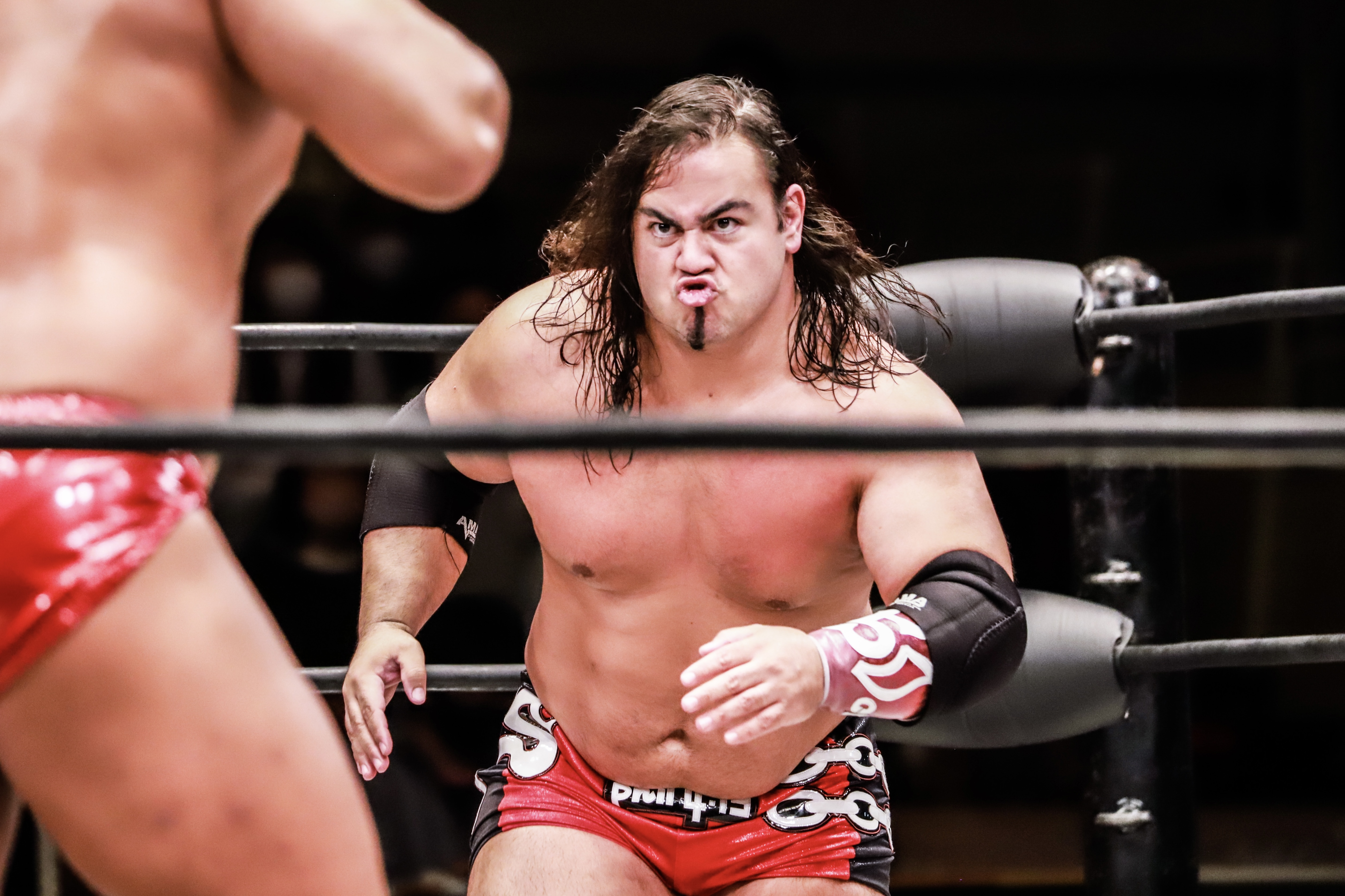
Quiet Storm wrestling in November 2022

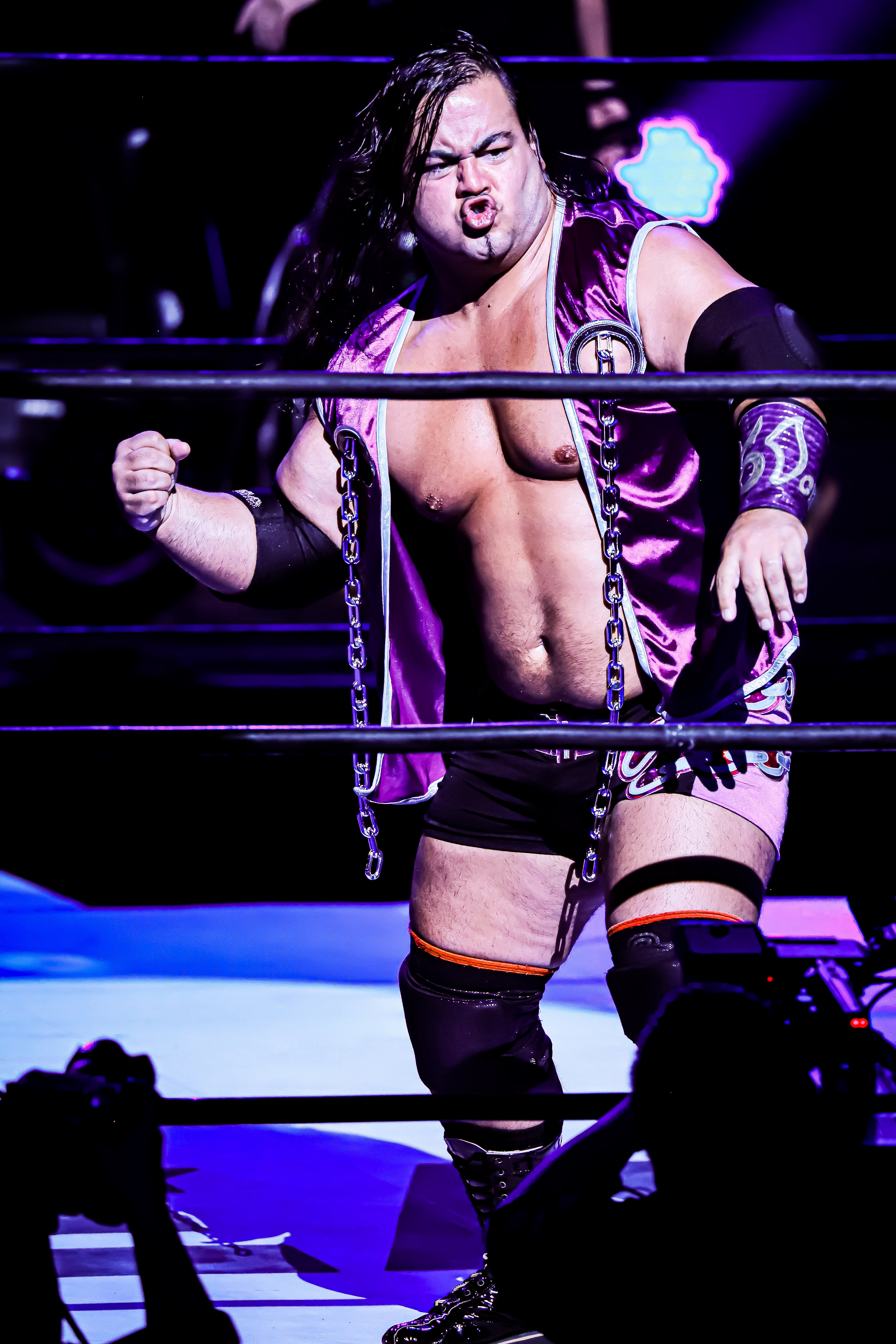
Storm in July 2023

Storm made his first appearance in Pro Wrestling Noah (Noah) on the second night if NOAH One Day Cruise from May 4, 2014, where he participated in a 10-man battle royale competing against Super Crazy, Takeshi Morishima, Zack Sabre Jr. and others. He continued to make sporadic appearances for the promotion such as at NOAH Navigation With Breeze 2014 on May 31, where he unsuccessfully challenged Daisuke Harada for the GHC Junior Heavyweight Championship. Storm marked notable work in the Global Junior Heavyweight Tag League, making his first appearance on the 2014 edition of the event, where he teamed up with Daisuke Harada, placing themselves in the Block B accumulating a total of six points leading the block, but fell short to Cho Kibou-Gun (Hajime Ohara and Kenoh) in the finals. Another notable tournament of the promotion in which Storm took place was the Noah Global League, making his first appearance on the 2014 edition, placing himself in the Block B, scoring a total of two points after going against Takashi Sugiura, Chris Hero, Yuji Nagata, Masato Tanaka, Maybach Taniguchi, Muhammad Yone and Mikey Nicholls. He scored his best performance at the 2016 edition, where he obtained eight points after competing against Minoru Suzuki, Toru Yano, Katsuhiko Nakajima, Lance Archer, Maybach Taniguchi, Akitoshi Saito and Takashi Iizuka. He also activated in the 2017 edition where he faced other new foes such as Kazma Sakamoto finishing with six points, and in the 2018 edition, where he scored another six points and newly faced Masa Kitamiya and Mitsuya Nagai.

== Championships and accomplishments ==
- Hardway Wrestling
  - HW Light Heavyweight Championship (1 time)
- Kaientai Dojo
  - FMW/WEW Hardcore Tag Team Championship (1 time) – with Boso Boy Raito
  - UWA World Middleweight Championship (1 time)
- Gleat
  - G-Infinity Championship (1 time) – with Ryuichi Kawakami
- New York Wrestling Connection
  - NYWC Heavyweight Championship (1 time)
- Osaka Pro Wrestling
  - Osaka Openweight Championship (2 times)
  - Osaka Tag Team Championship (1 time) – with Shigehiro Irie
- Premier Wrestling Federation
  - PWF Junior Heavyweight Championship (1 time)
- Pro Wrestling Illustrated
  - Ranked No. 239 of the top 500 singles wrestlers in the PWI 500 in 2003
- Pro Wrestling Noah
  - GHC Tag Team Championship (2 times) – with Muhammad Yone
- Pro Wrestling Zero1
  - NWA Intercontinental Tag Team Championship (1 time) – with Yuji Hino

== Luchas de Apuestas record ==
Winner (wager)	Loser (wager)	Location	Event	Date	Notes
Tutankhamen VIII (mask)	Summer Santa (mask)	Sendai, Japan	Michinoku Pro 3rd Fukumen World League (Night 28)	August 24, 2003	
