= Cruiserweight Classic =

2016 WWE Network event and tournament

- Promotional poster for the live finale featuring the Cruiserweight Classic trophy
- Promotion: WWE
- Date: June 23, 2016; July 14, 2016; August 26, 2016; September 14, 2016
- City: Winter Park, Florida
- Venue: Full Sail University

WWE event chronology
← Previous; Backlash	Next → Clash of Champions

The Cruiserweight Classic, formerly the Global Cruiserweight Series, was a 2016 professional wrestling tournament and WWE Network event produced by WWE. The tournament was contested by wrestlers from WWE's developmental brand, NXT, and wrestlers from the independent and international circuits; all participants were billed at a weight of 205 lbs or less to determine the inaugural WWE Cruiserweight Champion (Note: Despite having the same name, this was a new championship with its own separate lineage from the previous WWE Cruiserweight Championship that was originally established in World Championship Wrestling and acquired by WWE (at the time WWF) in 2001 and retired in 2007.) for WWE's revived cruiserweight division. The winner was T. J. Perkins.

The tournament consisted of various matches that had predetermined results. Tournament qualifying matches took place in various independent promotions, including well-known promotions such as Revolution Pro Wrestling, Progress Wrestling, and Evolve. Many cruiserweight wrestlers from around the world were given the chance to qualify for the 32-man tournament, which took place over four dates: June 23, July 13, August 26, and September 14, 2016.

== Background ==
In 2016, the American company WWE announced that it would be holding a 32-man professional wrestling tournament that would livestream exclusively on the WWE Network wherein all participants were billed at a weight of 205 lbs or less, referred to as cruiserweights. The event was originally titled the Global Cruiserweight Series before being renamed as the Cruiserweight Classic. Tournament qualifying matches took place in various promotions of the independent circuit, including well known promotions such as Revolution Pro Wrestling, Progress Wrestling, and Evolve. Many cruiserweight wrestlers from around the world were given the chance to qualify for the 32-man single-elimination tournament, which took place over four dates: June 23, July 13, August 26, and September 14. During the finale, it was announced that the winner of the tournament would become the inaugural WWE Cruiserweight Champion for WWE's revived cruiserweight division, which would compete on the Raw brand. The tournament consisted of various matches that had predetermined results.

=== Announced competitors ===
NXT competitors Rich Swann, Tommaso Ciampa, and Johnny Gargano along with international standouts Zack Sabre Jr., Noam Dar, Ho Ho Lun, and Akira Tozawa were announced for the Cruiserweight Classic. At an independent show in Orlando, Florida on April 2, Lince Dorado joined the series. On April 24 at Progress Wrestling Chapter 29, Sabre Jr. and Jack Gallagher also won a qualifying match, while on May 7 at Evolve 61, T. J. Perkins and Drew Gulak also joined the series. On June 11 at Evolve 63, Tony Nese defeated Johnny Gargano, Drew Gulak, T. J. Perkins, and Lince Dorado and qualified for the tournament. Two days later, WWE officially revealed all 32 wrestlers taking part in the tournament. Originally, Brazilian wrestler Zumbi was scheduled to compete in the Cruiserweight Classic. However, he had issues with his visa that WWE could not clear in time, and was replaced by Mustafa Ali.

== Qualifying matches ==
Progress Wrestling Chapter 29 - April 24 (Electric Ballroom - Camden Town, London)

No.	Results	Stipulations
1	Zack Sabre Jr. defeated Flash Morgan Webster	Cruiserweight Classic British Qualifying Match
2	Jack Gallagher defeated Pete Dunne	Cruiserweight Classic British Qualifying Match

Revolution Pro Wrestling Live at the Cockpit 8 - May 1 (Cockpit Theatre - Marylebone, London)

No.	Results	Stipulations
1	Noam Dar defeated Josh Bodom	Cruiserweight Classic British Qualifying Match

Evolve 61 - May 7 (La Boom - Woodside, Queens, New York)

No.	Results	Stipulations
1	T. J. Perkins (with Stokely Hathaway) defeated Fred Yehi	Cruiserweight Classic US Qualifying Match
2	Drew Gulak defeated Tracy Williams	Cruiserweight Classic US Qualifying Match

American Combat Wrestling The Tradition Continues! - May 28 (All Sports Arena - New Port Richey, Florida)

No.	Results	Stipulations
1	Lince Dorado defeated Romeo Quevedo	Cruiserweight Classic US Qualifying Match

Evolve 63 - June 11 (Downtown Recreation Complex - Orlando, Florida)

No.	Results	Stipulations
1	Tony Nese defeated Drew Gulak, Johnny Gargano, Lince Dorado and T. J. Perkins (with Stokely Hathaway)	WWE Cruiserweight Classic Flashpoint Elimination Match; Since Nese won, he qualified for the Cruiserweight Classic

== Participants ==
Wrestler	Weight (in pounds)
(Japan) Akira Tozawa	156
(Chile) Alejandro Saez	205
(United States) Anthony Bennett	147
(Iran) Ariya Daivari	180
(United States) The Brian Kendrick	157
(United States) Cedric Alexander	200
(France) Clément Petiot	199
(Germany) Da Mack	160
(Australia) Damian Slater	193
(United States) Drew Gulak	193
(Italy) Fabian Aichner	203
(Mexico) Gran Metalik	175
(India) Gurv Sihra	159
(India) Harv Sihra	144
(Hong Kong) Ho Ho Lun	155
(United Kingdom) Jack Gallagher	167
(Hong Kong) Jason Lee	154
(United States) Johnny Gargano	170
(United States) Kenneth Johnson	156
(Japan) Kota Ibushi	189
(Puerto Rico) Lince Dorado	168
(Pakistan) Mustafa Ali (Note: This competitor is a replacement for another participant who was taken out of the tournament)	182
(Scotland) Noam Dar	178
(Mexico) Raul Mendoza	178
(United States) Rich Swann	165
(American Samoa) Sean Maluta	191
(Philippines) T. J. Perkins	167
(Japan) Tajiri	189
(United States) Tommaso Ciampa	195
(United States) Tony Nese	196
(Canada) Tyson Dux	193
(United Kingdom) Zack Sabre Jr.	181

=== Alternates ===
In the event an official participant had suffered an injury or did not make the 205 lbs weight limit, they would have been replaced by one of the following participants:

Wrestler	Weight (in pounds)
Aaron Solow	182
Jesse Sorensen	184
Jesus Yurnet	182
Kai Katana	197
Vandal Ortagun	155

=== Replaced ===
These participants were taken out of the tournament for a specific reason and therefore were replaced by another competitor.

Wrestler	Weight (in pounds) (max. 205)	Progression in the tournament	Reason	Replacing wrestler
Zumbi	167	Replaced before the official start of the tournament	Visa issues	Mustafa Ali

== Broadcast team ==
Ring name	Real name	Notes
Mike Rome	Austin Romero	Ring announcer
Mauro Ranallo	Mauro Ranallo	Lead commentator
Daniel Bryan	Bryan Danielson	Color commentator

== Results ==
=== Tournament bracket ===
1st Round (Note: The first round of the tournament had a time limit of 20 minutes.); Cruiserweight Classic; June 23, 2016 (Aired: July 13 – August 3)
(United States) Kenneth Johnson	9:46
(Japan) Akira Tozawa	Pinfall
(United Kingdom) Jack Gallagher	Pinfall
(Italy) Fabian Aichner	6:45
(Japan) Tajiri	Pinfall
(Australia) Damian Slater	5:28
(Chile) Alejandro Saez	4:04
(Mexico) Gran Metalik	Pinfall
(India) Harv Sihra	5:18
(United States) Drew Gulak	Submission
(United Kingdom) Zack Sabre Jr.	Submission
(Canada) Tyson Dux	8:28
(Scotland) Noam Dar	Submission
(India) Gurv Sihra	5:26
(Iran) Ariya Daivari	5:03
(Hong Kong) Ho Ho Lun	Pinfall
(Mexico) Raul Mendoza	7:35
(United States) The Brian Kendrick	Submission
(United States) Anthony Bennett	6:34
(United States) Tony Nese	Pinfall
(Japan) Kota Ibushi	Pinfall
(American Samoa) Sean Maluta	9:40
(United States) Cedric Alexander	Pinfall
(France) Clément Petiot	5:58
(Philippines) T. J. Perkins	Submission
(Germany) Da Mack	6:32
(United States) Johnny Gargano	Pinfall
(United States) Tommaso Ciampa	10:47
(Pakistan) Mustafa Ali	5:55
(Puerto Rico) Lince Dorado	Pinfall
(United States) Rich Swann	Pinfall
(Hong Kong) Jason Lee	3:47

2nd Round (Note: The second round of the tournament had a time limit of 20 minutes.); Cruiserweight Classic; July 14, 2016 (Aired: August 10–24)
(Japan) Akira Tozawa	Pinfall
(United Kingdom) Jack Gallagher	11:38
(Japan) Tajiri	10:53
(Mexico) Gran Metalik	Pinfall
(United States) Drew Gulak	8:27
(United Kingdom) Zack Sabre Jr.	Pinfall
(Scotland) Noam Dar	Submission
(Hong Kong) Ho Ho Lun	7:02
(United States) The Brian Kendrick	Submission
(United States) Tony Nese	13:42
(Japan) Kota Ibushi	Pinfall
(United States) Cedric Alexander	15:00
(Philippines) T.J. Perkins	Submission
(United States) Johnny Gargano	12:18
(Puerto Rico) Lince Dorado	8:14
(United States) Rich Swann	Pinfall

Quarterfinals (Note: The quarterfinals of the tournament had a time limit of 30 minutes.); Cruiserweight Classic; August 26, 2016 (Aired: August 31 – September 7)
(Japan) Akira Tozawa	15:49
(Mexico) Gran Metalik	Pinfall
(United Kingdom) Zack Sabre Jr.	Submission
(Scotland) Noam Dar	15:46
(United States) The Brian Kendrick	13:58
(Japan) Kota Ibushi	Pinfall
(Philippines) T. J. Perkins	Submission
(United States) Rich Swann	17:03

Semifinals (Note: The semifinals of the tournament had a time limit of 30 minutes.); Cruiserweight Classic; September 14, 2016
(Mexico) Gran Metalik	Pinfall
(United Kingdom) Zack Sabre Jr.	13:13
(Japan) Kota Ibushi	14:52
(Philippines) T. J. Perkins	Submission

Final (Note: The tournament final had no time limit.); Cruiserweight Classic; September 14, 2016
(Mexico) Gran Metalik	17:47
(Philippines) T. J. Perkins	Submission

=== Finale ===
No.	Results	Stipulations	Times
1^{D}	The Bollywood Boyz (Gurv and Harv Sihra) defeated Ariya Daivari and Sean Maluta	Tag team match	05:15
2	Gran Metalik defeated Zack Sabre Jr.	Cruiserweight Classic tournament semi-final match	13:13
3	T. J. Perkins defeated Kota Ibushi by submission	Cruiserweight Classic tournament semi-final match	14:52
4	#DIY (Johnny Gargano and Tommaso Ciampa) defeated Cedric Alexander and Noam Dar	Tag team match	09:49
5	T. J. Perkins defeated Gran Metalik by submission	Cruiserweight Classic tournament final match for the inaugural WWE Cruiserweight Championship	17:47
D / – this was a dark match

== Aftermath ==
Before the final match between T. J. Perkins and Gran Metalik started, Triple H revealed that the winner of the tournament would be crowned the first WWE Cruiserweight Champion. Also, T. J. Perkins, Gran Metalik, Akira Tozawa, Jack Gallagher, Brian Kendrick, Cedric Alexander, Noam Dar, Lince Dorado, Tony Nese, Mustafa Ali, Drew Gulak, Tajiri, Ariya Daivari, Rich Swann and The Bollywood Boyz signed contracts with WWE. On July 15, Pro Wrestling Torch reported that Kota Ibushi had signed an NXT contract with WWE. In an interview published July 25, Ibushi admitted he had been offered a contract, but denied having signed it. After the tournament, Pro Wrestling Torch went back on their earlier report and stated that Ibushi had not agreed to a WWE contract beyond the tournament, which was a factor in him losing the semifinal match. Following the tournament, WWE revived its full-time cruiserweight division, leading to the launch of the cruiserweight-exclusive WWE 205 Live program in November 2016.

== See also ==
- WWE 205 Live
- Mae Young Classic
- WWE United Kingdom Championship Tournament
- D-Generation X: In Your House (A similar WWE tournament for lighter wrestlers culminated at this event)
