= NXT Cruiserweight Championship =

Former WWE professional wrestling championship

- The final NXT Cruiserweight Championship belt with default side plates (2020–2022)

Details
- Promotion: WWE
- Date established: September 14, 2016
- Date retired: January 4, 2022 (unified with the NXT North American Championship)

Other names
- WWE Cruiserweight Championship (2016–2019); NXT Cruiserweight Championship (2019–2022); Unified NXT North American Championship (2022); NXT North American Championship (2022)
Statistics
- First champion: T. J. Perkins
- Final champion: Carmelo Hayes
- Most reigns: 2 reigns: Neville; Enzo Amore
- Longest reign: Jordan Devlin (439 days (Note: WWE officially recognizes 438 days))
- Shortest reign: Carmelo Hayes (<1 minute (Note: Unified with the NXT North American Championship))
- Oldest champion: Roderick Strong (38 years, 57 days)
- Youngest champion: Lio Rush (24 years, 332 days)
- Heaviest champion: Buddy Murphy (Note: In kayfabe, Buddy Murphy had to take a weight cut to 205lbs, in order to compete for the WWE Cruiserweight championship) (225 lb (102 kg))
- Lightest champion: Akira Tozawa (156 lb (71 kg))

The NXT Cruiserweight Championship was a professional wrestling championship that was created and promoted by the American promotion WWE. Before its retirement, it was defended across the NXT, NXT UK, and 205 Live brand divisions, which were developmental territories for WWE. During its short tenure, it was the promotion's only championship with a weight limit, wherein only wrestlers 205 lb (93 kg) and under—designated as cruiserweights—could compete for the title.

Originally established as the WWE Cruiserweight Championship, it was first unveiled on September 14, 2016, as the award for the Cruiserweight Classic, which was won by T. J. Perkins. It was originally defended on Monday Night Raw as part of the Raw brand's cruiserweight division before the premiere of the cruiserweight-exclusive 205 Live in November 2016, after which, it was defended on both shows. Following WrestleMania 34 in 2018, the title became exclusively defended on the 205 Live brand. In October 2019, 205 Live merged under NXT and the title was renamed NXT Cruiserweight Championship, and the title's contendership was extended to NXT UK in January 2020. On January 4, 2022, at NXT 2.0: New Year's Evil, the title was unified into the NXT North American Championship, officially retiring the title in the process, with Carmelo Hayes recognized as the final champion.

The title was distinct from the previous WWE Cruiserweight Championship that originated in World Championship Wrestling and was retired in 2007. The two titles had shared the same name, but did not share the same title history or weight limit.

== History ==
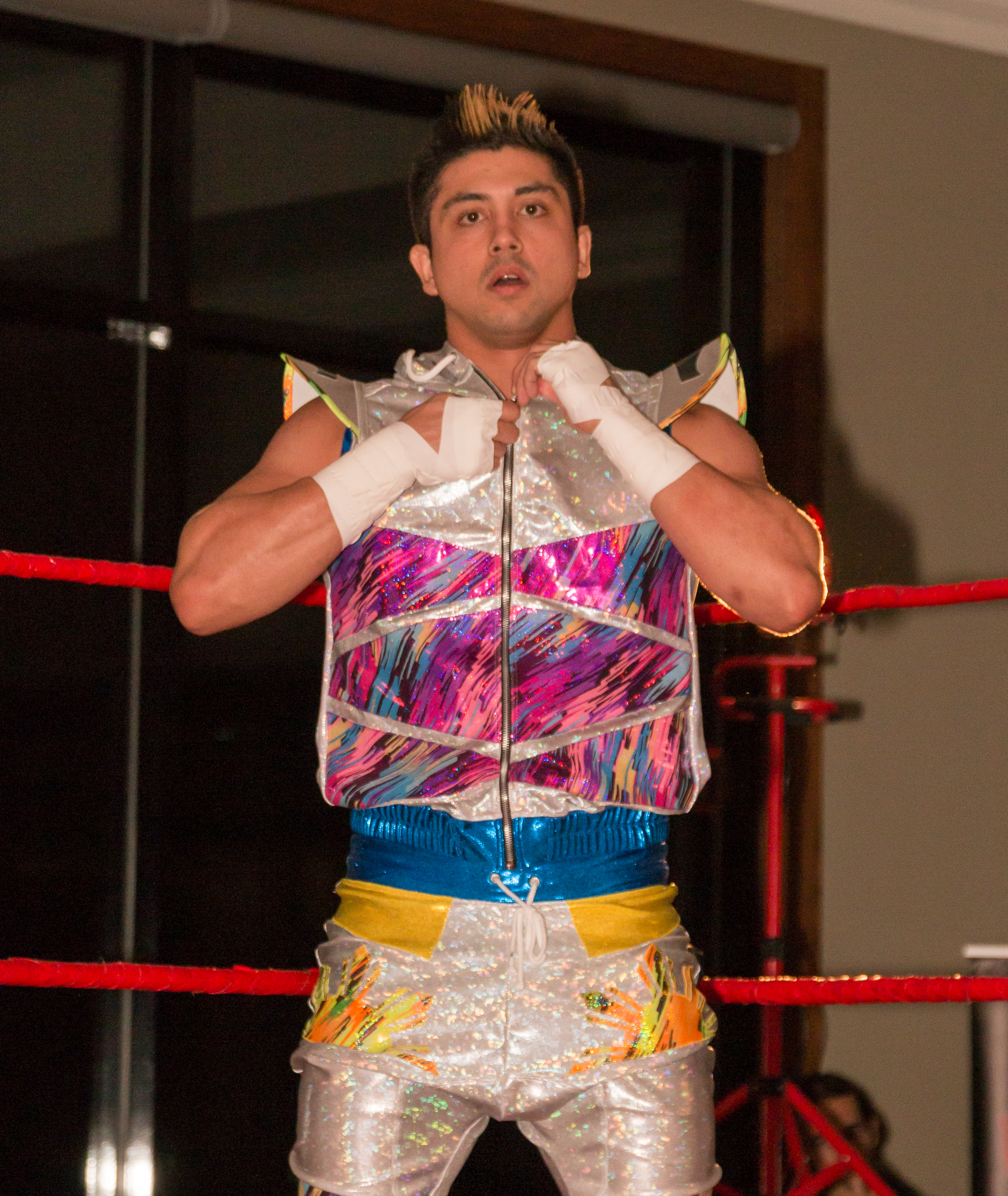
The inaugural Cruiserweight Champion T. J. Perkins

In mid-2016, WWE held the Cruiserweight Classic, a tournament for wrestlers 205 lb (93 kg) and under, billed as cruiserweights, that aired on the WWE Network. Tournament qualifying matches took place in various promotions of the independent circuit, including well known promotions such as Revolution Pro Wrestling, Progress Wrestling, and Evolve. Many cruiserweight wrestlers from around the world were given the chance to qualify for the 32-man single-elimination tournament, which took place over four dates: June 23, July 13, August 26, and September 14.

The final of the Cruiserweight Classic came down to T. J. Perkins and Gran Metalik. Before the final match, WWE executive Triple H revealed that the winner would not only receive a trophy but would also become the inaugural WWE Cruiserweight Champion for the revived cruiserweight division for the promotion's Raw brand. Perkins defeated Metalik to become the inaugural champion.

Originally, the championship was defended exclusively on Monday Night Raw. On November 29, 2016, a cruiserweight-exclusive show entitled 205 Live premiered on the WWE Network. On the premiere episode, Rich Swann defeated The Brian Kendrick to win the championship. The title then became defended on both Raw and 205 Live. In early 2018, Triple H was given creative control over 205 Live, as he had with the NXT brand, and began restructuring the show. Following WrestleMania 34, 205 Live became its own brand where the title became exclusively defended. Although the title became exclusive to 205 Live, it was still defended on WWE's main pay-per-views alongside Raw and SmackDown.

After then-champion Enzo Amore was released from WWE on January 23, 2018, and the title was vacated, it was announced that a general manager would be appointed for 205 Live and would address the championship. On the January 30 episode of 205 Live, Drake Maverick (formerly known as Rockstar Spud in Impact Wrestling) was appointed as the 205 Live General Manager. Maverick announced that there would be a 16-man single-elimination tournament to crown a new WWE Cruiserweight Champion, with the finals to occur on the WrestleMania 34 Kickoff pre-show. The tournament came down to Cedric Alexander and Mustafa Ali, where Alexander defeated Ali to win the vacant championship.

Prior to NXT moving to the USA Network in September 2019, NXT head Triple H spoke with Newsweek and said that "You'll start to see 205 [Live] begin to become part of NXT". He said that 205 Live's talent would start moving towards NXT, that 205 Live had "become lost in [the] limbo", and that the Cruiserweight Championship would have more meaning on NXT where it could create more opportunities for the cruiserweight wrestlers. It was then reported that the NXT Creative Team would be in charge of 205 Live. The following month, the title was renamed to the NXT Cruiserweight Championship, becoming part of the NXT brand, and started being defended on the NXT show.

On October 18, 2019, Drake Maverick—who himself was drafted to SmackDown but remained as the General Manager of 205 Live—announced that following the 2019 WWE Draft, he had made a talent exchange agreement with NXT General Manager William Regal, whereby NXT's cruiserweight wrestlers could also wrestle on 205 Live. With Jordan Devlin's win at Worlds Collide on January 25, 2020, the title also became shared with the NXT UK brand.

Due to the COVID-19 lockdown in Ireland, reigning champion Jordan Devlin was unable to travel outside of his home country and defend the title. On April 8, 2020, NXT General Manager William Regal announced a tournament to crown an interim champion in the United States which would begin on the April 15 episode of NXT. Devlin responded by stating that whoever won was a fraud, and that he would prove that he was the only true NXT Cruiserweight Champion upon his return. The interim championship tournament was won by Santos Escobar, who used his prior persona El Hijo del Fantasma during the tournament. After the travel ban was lifted, Devlin made his return to the U.S. on the March 17, 2021, episode of NXT and confronted Escobar over who the real champion was. Escobar then challenged Devlin to a match at TakeOver: Stand & Deliver to determine the undisputed NXT Cruiserweight Champion. The match was subsequently scheduled as a ladder match on Night 2 of the event on April 8. At the event, Escobar defeated Devlin to become the undisputed champion, ending Devlin's reign at 439 days while continuing Escobar's.

Although the championship was established exclusively for cruiserweight wrestlers, this ruling was lifted once for a match at NXT WarGames on December 5, 2021. Joe Gacy, who weighed 245 lbs, felt that the championship weight shamed wrestlers who were above the weight limit. Reigning NXT Cruiserweight Champion Roderick Strong allowed Gacy to challenge for the title at WarGames, with Gacy proclaiming that if he won the title, he would make it an all-inclusive championship. At the event, however, Strong retained.

In January 2022, the championship was unified into the NXT North American Championship. At the special New Year's Evil episode of NXT 2.0 on January 4, 2022, North American Champion Carmelo Hayes defeated reigning Cruiserweight Champion Roderick Strong to unify the titles with Hayes recognized as the final champion and going forward as North American Champion.

=== Inaugural tournament (2016) ===
The Cruiserweight Classic was a professional wrestling tournament, where all participants were billed at a weight of 205 lbs or less, to determine the inaugural WWE Cruiserweight Champion for WWE's revived cruiserweight division. Tournament qualifying matches took place in various promotions of the independent circuit, including well-known promotions such as Revolution Pro Wrestling, Progress Wrestling, and Evolve.

1st Round (Note: The first round of the tournament had a time limit of 20 minutes.); Cruiserweight Classic; June 23, 2016 (Aired: July 13 – August 3)
(United States) Kenneth Johnson	9:46
(Japan) Akira Tozawa	Pinfall
(United Kingdom) Jack Gallagher	Pinfall
(Italy) Fabian Aichner	6:45
(Japan) Tajiri	Pinfall
(Australia) Damian Slater	5:28
(Chile) Alejandro Saez	4:04
(Mexico) Gran Metalik	Pinfall
(India) Harv Sihra	5:18
(United States) Drew Gulak	Submission
(United Kingdom) Zack Sabre Jr.	Submission
(Canada) Tyson Dux	8:28
(Scotland) Noam Dar	Submission
(India) Gurv Sihra	5:26
(Iran) Ariya Daivari	5:03
(Hong Kong) Ho Ho Lun	Pinfall
(Mexico) Raul Mendoza	7:35
(United States) The Brian Kendrick	Submission
(United States) Anthony Bennett	6:34
(United States) Tony Nese	Pinfall
(Japan) Kota Ibushi	Pinfall
(American Samoa) Sean Maluta	9:40
(United States) Cedric Alexander	Pinfall
(France) Clément Petiot	5:58
(Philippines) T. J. Perkins	Submission
(Germany) Da Mack	6:32
(United States) Johnny Gargano	Pinfall
(United States) Tommaso Ciampa	10:47
(Pakistan) Mustafa Ali	5:55
(Puerto Rico) Lince Dorado	Pinfall
(United States) Rich Swann	Pinfall
(Hong Kong) Jason Lee	3:47

2nd Round (Note: The second round of the tournament had a time limit of 20 minutes.); Cruiserweight Classic; July 14, 2016 (Aired: August 10–24)
(Japan) Akira Tozawa	Pinfall
(United Kingdom) Jack Gallagher	11:38
(Japan) Tajiri	10:53
(Mexico) Gran Metalik	Pinfall
(United States) Drew Gulak	8:27
(United Kingdom) Zack Sabre Jr.	Pinfall
(Scotland) Noam Dar	Submission
(Hong Kong) Ho Ho Lun	7:02
(United States) The Brian Kendrick	Submission
(United States) Tony Nese	13:42
(Japan) Kota Ibushi	Pinfall
(United States) Cedric Alexander	15:00
(Philippines) T.J. Perkins	Submission
(United States) Johnny Gargano	12:18
(Puerto Rico) Lince Dorado	8:14
(United States) Rich Swann	Pinfall

Quarterfinals (Note: The quarterfinals of the tournament had a time limit of 30 minutes.); Cruiserweight Classic; August 26, 2016 (Aired: August 31 – September 7)
(Japan) Akira Tozawa	15:49
(Mexico) Gran Metalik	Pinfall
(United Kingdom) Zack Sabre Jr.	Submission
(Scotland) Noam Dar	15:46
(United States) The Brian Kendrick	13:58
(Japan) Kota Ibushi	Pinfall
(Philippines) T. J. Perkins	Submission
(United States) Rich Swann	17:03

Semifinals (Note: The semifinals of the tournament had a time limit of 30 minutes.); Cruiserweight Classic; September 14, 2016
(Mexico) Gran Metalik	Pinfall
(United Kingdom) Zack Sabre Jr.	13:13
(Japan) Kota Ibushi	14:52
(Philippines) T. J. Perkins	Submission

Final (Note: The tournament final had no time limit.); Cruiserweight Classic; September 14, 2016
(Mexico) Gran Metalik	17:47
(Philippines) T. J. Perkins	Submission

=== Interim championship tournament (2020) ===
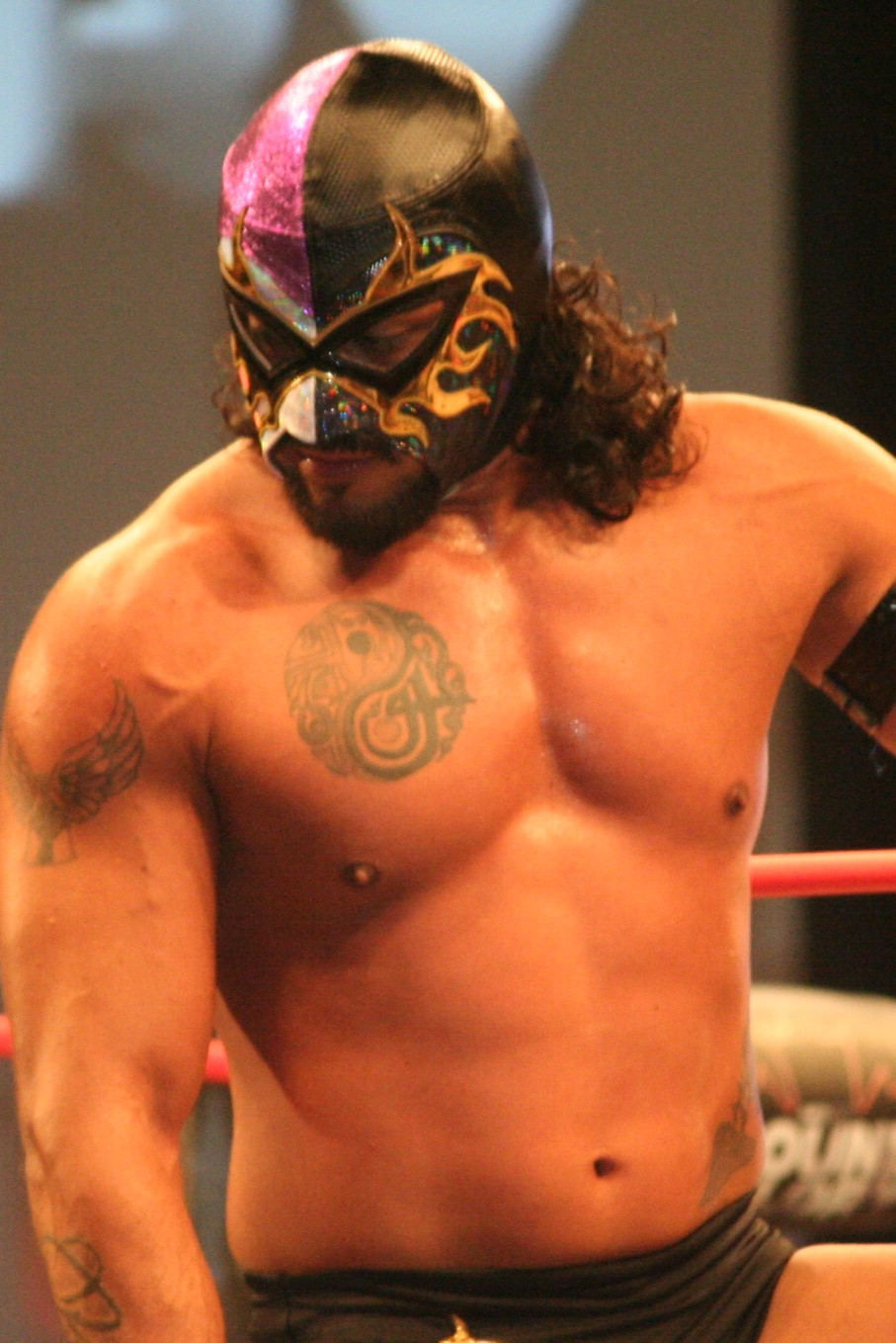
Interim NXT Cruiserweight Champion El Hijo del Fantasma.

An eight-man round-robin tournament began on April 15, 2020, to determine the interim NXT Cruiserweight Champion after Jordan Devlin was unable to defend the title due to COVID-19 pandemic-related travel restrictions. The participants were split into two groups of four. The wrestlers with the best record in each group then competed to determine the interim champion. Any ties were broken by head-to-head results. Although Drake Maverick was released by WWE on April 15, he confirmed via Twitter that he would still be competing in the tournament. As a result of a tie in Group A, Maverick, Kushida, and Jake Atlas faced each other in a triple threat match on the May 27 episode of NXT to determine the winner of the group. Maverick won to advance to the final against Group B's winner, El Hijo del Fantasma.

Color key

Wrestler qualified to final
Wrestler won the match
Wrestler lost the match

Group A bracket
Group A	Kushida	Nese	Atlas	Maverick	Record
Kushida	—N/a	NXT; April 22, 2020	NXT; May 6, 2020	NXT; May 20, 2020	2–1
Tony Nese	NXT; April 22, 2020	—N/a	NXT; May 13, 2020	NXT; April 29, 2020	0–3
Jake Atlas	NXT; May 6, 2020	NXT; May 13, 2020	—N/a	NXT; April 22, 2020	2–1
Drake Maverick	NXT; May 20, 2020	NXT; April 29, 2020	NXT; April 22, 2020	—N/a	2–1

Group B bracket
Group B	Scott	Fantasma	Tozawa	Gallagher	Record
Isaiah "Swerve" Scott	—N/a	NXT; April 29, 2020	NXT; April 15, 2020	NXT; May 13, 2020	1–2
El Hijo del Fantasma	NXT; April 29, 2020	—N/a	NXT; May 20, 2020	NXT; April 22, 2020	2–1
Akira Tozawa	NXT; April 15, 2020	NXT; May 20, 2020	—N/a	NXT; May 6, 2020	2–1
Gentleman Jack Gallagher	NXT; May 13, 2020	NXT; April 22, 2020	NXT; May 6, 2020	—N/a	1–2

Group A Decision; NXT; May 27, 2020			Final; NXT; June 3, 2020
			A1	Drake Maverick	Pinfall
			B1	El Hijo del Fantasma	17:16
A1 A2	Kushida Jake Atlas	7:53 —	B1	El Hijo del Fantasma	17:16
A3	Drake Maverick	Pinfall

== Brand designation history ==
The following is a list of dates indicating the transitions of the NXT Cruiserweight Championship between WWE's brands.

Date of transition	Brand	Notes
September 14, 2016	Raw	The championship was established for Raw as the WWE Cruiserweight Championship. T. J. Perkins became the inaugural champion by winning the Cruiserweight Classic.
April 9, 2018	205 Live	The WWE Cruiserweight Championship became exclusive to 205 Live after the establishment of that brand following WrestleMania 34 on April 8, 2018.
October 9, 2019	205 Live, NXT, NXT UK	When 205 Live was integrated with NXT in October 2019, the WWE Cruiserweight Championship was renamed to NXT Cruiserweight Championship and became shared between both brands. Beginning January 25, 2020, the NXT Cruiserweight Championship also became shared with NXT UK.
January 4, 2022	N/A	The NXT Cruiserweight Championship was retired after it was unified with the NXT North American Championship.

== Belt design ==
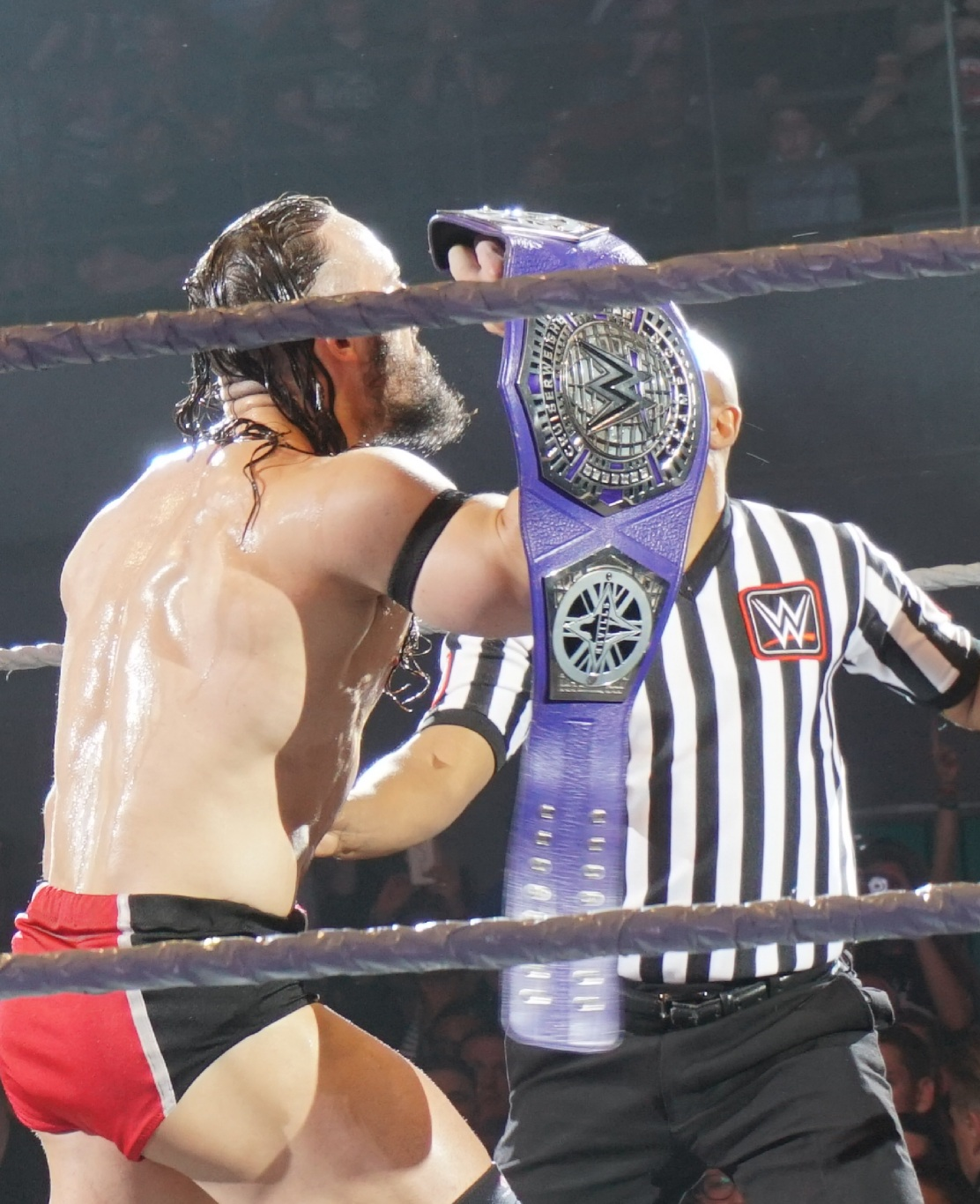
Adrian Neville with the first design of the title as the plates are silver only.

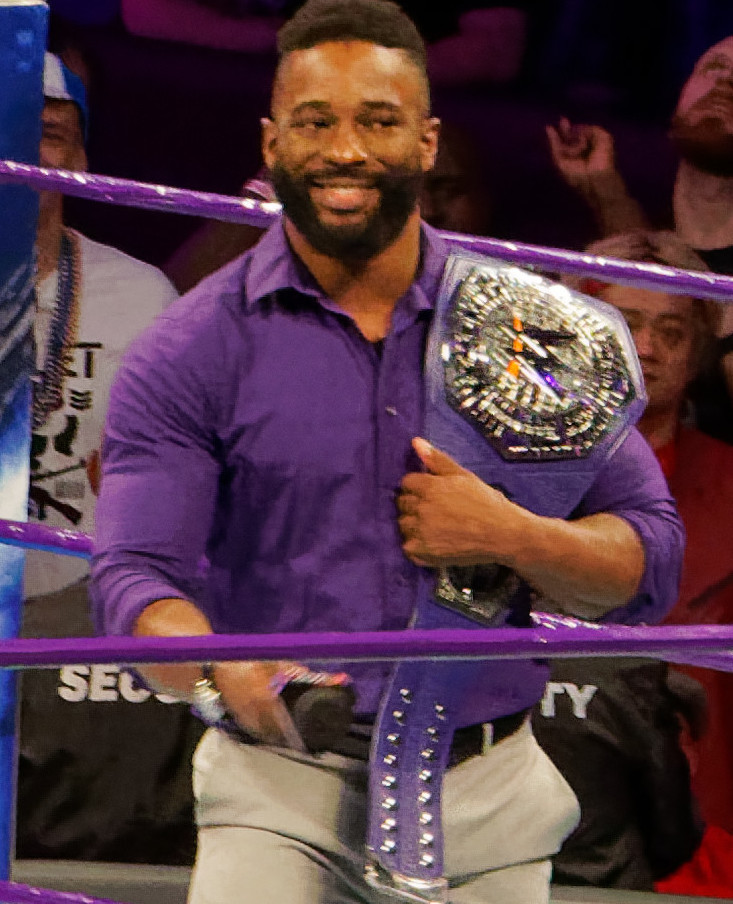
Cedric Alexander with the second design of the title with the orange line under the WWE Logo.

When the championship was introduced, the irregularly shaped center plate of the belt largely featured a globe with the WWE logo over the top of it. Above the globe was a banner that read "Cruiserweight" and below the globe was one that read "Champion". Ornamentation filled out the rest of the plate. In what became a prominent feature of WWE's championship belts, the side plates featured removable center sections, allowing the holder's personal logo to be added to the championship belt; the default side plates showed silver and purple world maps with the WWE logo over them. The plates were on a purple strap. During Neville's first reign, the color of the slash under the WWE logo on the center plate and default side plates was changed from purple to orange.

After the title was renamed to NXT Cruiserweight Championship, Triple H and NXT General Manager William Regal presented an updated version of the Cruiserweight Championship belt to reigning champion Angel Garza on January 25, 2020. The design was largely the same, except the WWE logo on the center plate was replaced with a vertical NXT logo and the purple strap was changed to a dark purple, almost black colored strap. The color of the slash under the WWE logo on the side plates was also changed to silver.

== Reigns ==
Throughout the championship's 5 year, 3 month, and 22 day history, there were 20 reigns between 18 champions and one vacancy. The inaugural champion was T. J. Perkins. The oldest champion was Roderick Strong, winning the title at 38 years old, while the youngest champion was Lio Rush when he won it at 24. Neville and Enzo Amore were tied for the most reigns at two. Jordan Devlin's sole reign was the longest reign at 439 days, while final champion Carmelo Hayes' singular reign was the shortest at less than a minute as the title was immediately retired after he won it in a title unification match.
