= Alejandro Saez =

Chilean professional wrestler

Personal information
- Born: Manuel Alejandro Saez Palominos; February 7, 1987 (age 39) Santiago, Chile

Professional wrestling career
- Ring name(s): Alejandro Saez; El Monstruo; El Mostro; Gabriel; Xtra Large
- Billed height: 6 ft 1 in (1.85 m)
- Billed weight: 195 lb (88 kg)
- Billed from: Santiago, Chile
- Trained by: Eddie Sharkey; Mr. Boogie; Perfecto Bundy; Santiago Sangriento
- Debut: 2002

Manuel Alejandro Saez Palominos, better known simply as Alejandro Saez, is a Chilean professional wrestler currently competing for various professional wrestling promotions on the independent circuit. He is known by the ring name Xtra Large (meaning "extra large" as it implies) on the independent scene. In 2016, Saez was a participant in the WWE Cruiserweight Classic, where he was eliminated in the first round. In addition to WWE, Saez has also toured with Pro Wrestling Noah, where he competed in the 2016 Global League.

== Early life ==
Saez was born and raised in Chile, of South America. He lives in the town of Pudahuel, Santiago de Chile. Manuel speaks Spanish and knows some English.

Saez grew up as a fan of professional wrestling citing Shane McMahon as one of his favourite wrestlers.

== Professional wrestling career ==
=== Early career (2002–2017) ===
Manuel began his wrestling career in early 2002 on the independent circuit.

In 2006, Saez began wrestling for Revolucion Lucha Libre under the ring name as Xtra Large. He would compete on the lower card in singles competition, but eventually formed a tag team with Bunny. On April 30, 2006, XL and Bunny defeated Coyote 2.0 and Pensacola to win the RLL Tag Team Championships.

In XNL, Saez defeated Giger to win the XNL World championship after feuding with Giger on previous shows.

In 2013 he represented Chilean promotion Xplosion Nacional de Lucha in the first ever Torneo Latino Americano de Lucha Libre, in São Paulo, Brazil. He was defeated in the first round by Pro Wrestling Noah's Takeshi Morishima.

In 2015, Saez, along with Ariki Toa, Lenko Sins, Solar Sanchez, Domina and Sergio Catalan, formed a stable named L.A.D. within the Xtreme Latin American Wrestling promotion in Chile. The stable has disbanded as of 2016.

On March 5, 2017 at a CNL Chile (Campeonato Nacional de Lucha Libre) event, Saez defeated Engranaje Jack for his first and only CNL Metropolitan Championship in the promotion.

=== Pro Wrestling Noah (2014, 2016-2017) ===
Saez made his Japanese debut on January 15, 2014, as XL, where he was defeated by Akitoshi Saito. He would also briefly tag with Bobby Fish. Saez returned to the promotion as part of the 2016 Global League, finishing the tournament with a total of six points scored after competing against Masa Kitamiya, Muhammad Yone, Davey Boy Smith Jr., Naomichi Marufuji, Takashi Sugiura, Go Shiozaki and Kaito Kiyomiya. On November 3, 2016, Saez defeated Davey Boy Smith, and on January 7, 2017, Saez defeated Hi69.

=== WWE Cruiserweight Classic (2016) ===
In June 2016, WWE announced Saez as one of the 32 participants in the WWE Cruiserweight Classic tournament. In the first round of the tournament, Saez was eliminated by Gran Metalik. Saez was the first Chilean wrestler to compete in WWE. Saez was the heaviest wrestler in the tournament, at 205 pounds, which is the weight limit of a cruiserweight. For Saez to make the tournament, he fasted and trained to shred 25 pounds, as before this he was 230 pounds. Alejandro stated that this took him 2 weeks to accomplish.

In 2018, Saez announced that had been selected among the 45 selected from all Latin America to participate in the first Tryout of Latin Americans of the WWE, which were done from 2 to 4 December in Santiago.

=== 5 Luchas Clandestino (2017–present) ===
In 2017, Saez returned to Santiago de Chile to wrestle in the independent scene of the country. He started to run his own promotion and wrestling training center called "5 Luchas Clandestino". Currently he is the leader of a new wrestling faction called "Carnaval de Sangre", with "Sexualizer", "Kristy", "Carnicero Humano" and "Azagoth Firelord". Some of the other wrestlers are Katrina Cortez of WWE NXT, Zatara, who participated in the Mae Young Classic (2018) and Guanchulo who was part of DDT Pro-Wrestling along with Saez.

== Championships and accomplishments ==
- Campeonato Nacional de Lucha Libre
  - CNL Metropolitan Championship (1 time)
  - CNL Tag Team Championship (1 time)
- Brazilian Wrestling Federation
  - Torneo Latino americano de Lucha Libre 2014 winner
- Leader Wrestling Association
  - LWA Maximo Championship (1 time)
  - LWA Tag Team Championship (1 time) - with Ariki Toa
- Pro Wrestling Illustrated
  - PWI ranked him No. 357 of the top 500 singles wrestlers in the PWI 500 in 2016
- Revolucion Lucha Libre
  - RLL Absoluto Championship (1 time)
  - RLL Regional Championship (1 time)
  - RLL Tag Team Championship (1 time) - with Bunny
- Xtreme Latin American Wrestling
  - X-LAW Junior Heavyweight Championship (1 time)
- Xplosion Nacional de Lucha Libre
  - XNL Lucha Clasificatoria TNT tournament winner
  - XNL National Tag Team Championship (1 time) - with Fear
  - XNL World Championship (4 times)

== See also ==
- List of professional wrestling promotions in South America
