= WWE 205 Live =

Professional wrestling streaming television series

- Created by: Vince McMahon; Paul "Triple H" Levesque
- Written by: Dewey Foley (Lead writer); See list of 205 Live creative writers
- Opening theme: "Hail the Crown" by CFO$ featuring From Ashes to New "Legend" by CFO$ featuring Moosh and Twist (Bumper) "Take a Stand" by CFO$ (Bumper)
- Composer: CFO$
- Country of origin: United States
- No. of seasons: 7
- No. of episodes: 270

Production
- Camera setup: Multicamera setup
- Running time: 30-60 minutes

Original release
- Network: WWE Network and Peacock
- Release: November 29, 2016 – February 11, 2022

Related
- WWE NXT Level Up (2022–2024)

WWE 205 Live, or simply 205 Live, is an American professional wrestling streaming television program that was produced by WWE. It premiered on November 29, 2016, as a replacement for WWE Superstars, and ended on February 11, 2022. The show originally aired exclusively on the WWE Network until March 2021 when the American version of the WWE Network merged under Peacock, after which, it was available on Peacock in the United States and the WWE Network in international markets.

The show was originally centered around cruiserweights, male competitors billed at a maximum weight of 205 lbs from the namesake 205 Live brand. With some exceptions, the show originally aired live (as its name implied) at 10 p.m. Eastern Time (ET), and was usually presented from the same venue as that night's episode of WWE SmackDown. By 2020, 205 Live episodes were pre-taped on the Tuesday before its airing.

In October 2019, 205 Live was integrated with the NXT brand with cruiserweights from both NXT and NXT UK appearing on the show. By August 2021, the show included female competitors as well as male competitors above the weight limit. The final episode of the series aired on February 11, 2022, and it was replaced by NXT Level Up the following week on February 18.

== History ==
=== 2016–2018 ===
205 Live was established following the success of the Cruiserweight Classic tournament, to feature those who competed in the tournament and others who have become full-time members of WWE's cruiserweight division. Triple H, WWE executive producer and wrestler, stated the program was designed to serve as a showcase for the division, with its own distinctive feel and style compared to other WWE programming.

The Raw brand was originally established as the exclusive home of the division during the 2016 brand extension, with all cruiserweights being drafted to Raw during the 2016 WWE draft. Following the premiere of 205 Live, the cruiserweight wrestlers appear on both Raw and 205 Live, as well as making occasional appearances on NXT.

The show premiered on November 29, 2016; the main event of the inaugural episode saw Rich Swann defeating The Brian Kendrick for the WWE Cruiserweight Championship. The show would replace WWE Superstars, a show focused on the superstars of Raw, and Talking Smack, which previously held the post-Smackdown 10 p.m. ET time slot before moving to 11 p.m. after the debut of 205 Live.

In January 2018, Triple H took over the creative side of 205 Live. The first of the changes under Triple H was Drake Maverick as the brand on-screen general Manager. He announced a 16-man tournament for the vacant WWE Cruiserweight Championship, which was won by Cedric Alexander on the WrestleMania 34 kickoff. Once the tournament begun, WWE's cruiserweight division began to wrestle exclusively on 205 Live and ceased to appear on Raw.

In September 2018, due to the second season of WWE Mixed Match Challenge, 205 Live went from a live format airing post-SmackDown to a pre-taped format (being taped before SmackDown goes live) and airing before NXT on Wednesdays.

=== 2019–2022 ===
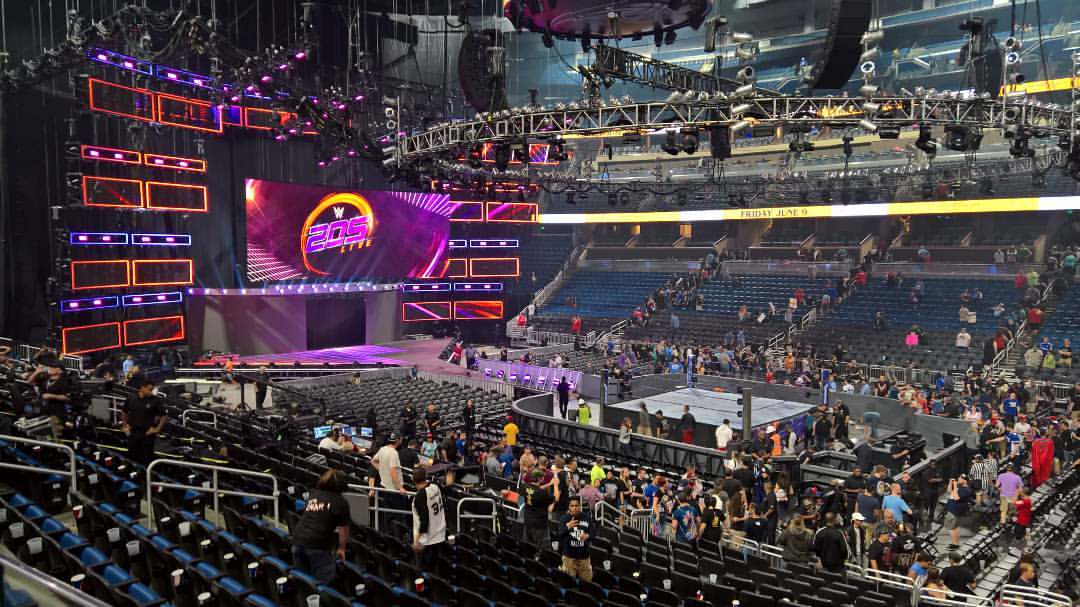
205 Live at Amway Center on April 4, 2017

On January 15, 2019, the show moved back to Tuesday nights at 10:00 p.m. ET and began airing live again.

Just prior to WWE NXT moving to USA Network, NXT head Triple H spoke with Newsweek in September 2019 and said that "You'll start to see 205 [Live] begin to" become part of NXT. He said that 205 Live's talent would start moving towards NXT, that 205 Live had "become lost in [the] limbo", and that the Cruiserweight Championship would have more meaning on NXT where it could create more opportunities for the cruiserweight wrestlers. It was then reported that the NXT Creative Team would be in charge of 205 Live. The following month, the title began to be defended on NXT and was renamed to "NXT Cruiserweight Championship", becoming a part of the NXT brand.

Following SmackDown's move to Friday nights on October 4, 2019, 205 Live was also moved.

The integration of 205 Live with NXT took effect in-universe on October 18, 2019, following the 2019 WWE Draft, when Drake Maverick – who himself was drafted to SmackDown but remaining as the general manager of 205 Live, announced that he had made a talent exchange agreement with NXT General Manager William Regal, whereby NXT cruiserweights could now appear on 205 Live. However, on April 12, 2020, Maverick announced that he was no longer 205 Live general manager and that William Regal will instead be overseeing the Cruiserweight Division.

Due to both Raw and SmackDown recording shows in Manchester, England, the November 8, 2019 episode was recorded from the NXT "Full Sail Live" studio at Full Sail University.

Due to the COVID-19 pandemic in the United States, 205 Live moved to the WWE Performance Center indefinitely in March 2020, as with most other WWE programming. In August 2020, it briefly moved to Amway Center via WWE's "ThunderDome" residency, before moving back to the Performance Center to join NXT in its new "Capitol Wrestling Center" studio.

In 2021, first-round tournament matches for the Dusty Rhodes Tag Team Classic were held on 205 Live, as tag teams from the 205 Live brand also took part. A women's version of the tournament was also introduced in 2021, and as part of the inaugural Women's Dusty Rhodes Tag Team Classic, women's matches were held for the first time on 205 Live; the first match specifically saw The Way (Candice LeRae and Indi Hartwell) defeat the team of Cora Jade and Gigi Dolin on the January 22 episode.

By Summer 2021, as a result of significant roster cuts, the show's format would change to lift the restriction on weight limits starting with the August 13 episode. On February 15, 2022, PWInsider reported that WWE was ceasing the production of 205 Live episodes, replacing the series with NXT Level Up. 205 Live aired its final episode on February 11, with Level Up premiering on February 18.

== On-air personalities ==
=== Authority figures ===
Authority figure	Position	Date started	Date finished	Notes
Drake Maverick	General Manager	January 30, 2018	April 12, 2020	Daniel Bryan announced Maverick as the new general manager of the cruiserweight division on the January 30, 2018 episode of 205 Live
William Regal	General Manager	April 12, 2020	January 5, 2022	Drake Maverick stepped down as 205 Live General Manager to return to in-ring competition. NXT General Manager William Regal was announced to take his place in addition to NXT.

=== Commentators ===
Commentators	Date started	Date finished
Mauro Ranallo, Corey Graves and Austin Aries	November 29, 2016	February 28, 2017
Mauro Ranallo and Corey Graves	March 7, 2017	
Tom Phillips and Corey Graves	March 14, 2017	June 6, 2017
Vic Joseph and Corey Graves	June 13, 2017	August 29, 2017
Vic Joseph and Corey Graves	August 28, 2020	
Vic Joseph and Nigel McGuinness	September 5, 2017	September 19, 2017
Vic Joseph and Nigel McGuinness	October 3, 2017	April 3, 2018
Vic Joseph and Nigel McGuinness	September 18, 2020	April 16, 2021
Vic Joseph and Nigel McGuinness	June 4, 2021	January 21, 2022
Vic Joseph and Byron Saxton	September 26, 2017	
Vic Joseph and Byron Saxton	August 28, 2020	
Vic Joseph and Percy Watson	April 10, 2018	April 23, 2018
Vic Joseph and Percy Watson	January 15, 2019	January 21, 2019
Vic Joseph, Nigel McGuinness and Percy Watson	April 24, 2018	June 12, 2018
Vic Joseph, Nigel McGuinness and Percy Watson	June 26, 2018	January 22, 2019
Tom Phillips and Percy Watson	June 19, 2018	
Vic Joseph, Nigel McGuinness, Percy Watson and Wale	August 21, 2018 (During the first 30 minutes)	
Vic Joseph, Nigel McGuinness and Aiden English	January 22, 2019	April 16, 2019
Vic Joseph, Nigel McGuinness and Aiden English	May 7, 2019	
Vic Joseph, Nigel McGuinness and Aiden English	May 21, 2019	June 11, 2019
Vic Joseph, Nigel McGuinness and Aiden English	June 25, 2019	July 16, 2019
Vic Joseph, Nigel McGuinness and Aiden English	July 30, 2019	August 20, 2019
Vic Joseph, Nigel McGuinness and Aiden English	September 3, 2019	
Vic Joseph, Aiden English and David Otunga	April 23, 2019	
Vic Joseph, Nigel McGuinness, Aiden English and David Otunga	April 30, 2019	
Byron Saxton, Nigel McGuinness and Aiden English	May 14, 2019	
Tom Phillips, Nigel McGuinness and Aiden English	June 18, 2019	
Tom Phillips, Nigel McGuinness and Aiden English	August 27, 2019	
Vic Joseph and Aiden English	July 23, 2019	
Vic Joseph, Aiden English and Dio Maddin	September 10, 2019	September 24, 2019
Tom Phillips and Aiden English	October 11, 2019	January 10, 2020
Jon Quasto and Aiden English	November 15, 2019	
Jon Quasto and Aiden English	January 24, 2020	April 3, 2020
Jon Quasto and Mansoor	January 17, 2020	
Jon Quasto and Byron Saxton	April 10, 2020	
Byron Saxton and Corey Graves	May 15, 2020	July 10, 2020
Byron Saxton and Drew Gulak	June 26, 2020	July 3, 2020
Vic Joseph and Drew Gulak	July 17, 2020	September 11, 2020
Byron Saxton and Nigel McGuinness	September 25, 2020	October 9, 2020
Tom Phillips and Nigel McGuinness	April 23, 2021	May 28, 2021
Sudu Shah and Nigel McGuinness	January 28, 2022	February 11, 2022

- When McGuinness was absent at the time, he was filled in by SmackDown Live's Byron Saxton.
- When McGuinness was absent for the birth of his daughter, he was filled in by his colleague from NXT Percy Watson for two weeks.
- When Joseph and McGuinness were absent for the UK Championship Tournament, so both men were replaced by SmackDown Live's Tom Phillips.
- When McGuinness was absent at the time, he was filled in by one of the pre-show panelists David Otunga.
- When Joseph has been traded recently for Main Event, SmackDown Live's Byron Saxton fills in for him as play-by-play.

=== Ring announcers ===
Ring announcers	Date started	Date finished	Notes
Greg Hamilton	November 29, 2016	May 28, 2019	Ring announcer for Friday Night SmackDown
Greg Hamilton	June 11, 2019	October 2, 2020	Ring announcer for Friday Night SmackDown
Kayla Braxton	June 4, 2019	November 11, 2019	
Alicia Taylor	October 9, 2020	April 16, 2021	Ring announcer for NXT
Alicia Taylor	January 14, 2022	February 11, 2022	Ring announcer for NXT
Samantha Irvin	April 23, 2021	January 7, 2022	
