= Noah Grand Ship In Nagoya 2023 =

2023 Pro Wrestling Noah event

NOAH Grand Ship In Nagoya 2023
- Promotional poster featuring various participants
- Promotion: CyberFight
- Brand: Pro Wrestling Noah
- Date: September 24, 2023
- City: Nagoya, Japan
- Venue: Nagoya Congress Center
- Attendance: 940

Pay-per-view chronology
← Previous; Great Journey in Nagoya 2023	Next → Demolition Stage In Fukuoka 2023

Grand Ship In Nagoya chronology
← Previous; 2022	Next → —

NOAH Grand Ship In Nagoya 2023 was a professional wrestling event promoted by CyberFight's sub-brand Pro Wrestling Noah. It took place on September 24, 2023, in Nagoya, Japan, at the Nagoya Congress Center. The event aired on CyberAgent's AbemaTV online linear television service and CyberFight's streaming service Wrestle Universe.

Eleven matches were contested at the event, including three on the pre-show, and all five of Noah's championships were on the line. The main event saw Jake Lee defeat Go Shiozaki to retain the GHC Heavyweight Championship. Other top matches included Los Golpeadores (Dragon Bane and Alpha Wolf) defeating Ninja Mack and Alejandro to win the vacant GHC Junior Heavyweight Tag Team Championship, and Good Looking Guys (Jack Morris and Anthony Greene) defeated Real (Timothy Thatcher and Saxon Huxley) to win the GHC Tag Team Championship.

== Background ==
=== Storylines ===
The event featured eleven professional wrestling matches that resulted from scripted storylines, where wrestlers portrayed villains, heroes, or less distinguishable characters in the scripted events that built tension and culminated in a wrestling match or series of matches.

=== Event ===
The preshow included three bouts which were broadcast live on Noah's YouTube channel. In the first one, Daichi Ozawa, Stallion Rogers, Atsushi Kotoge and Akitoshi Saito defeated Yu Owada, Hi69, Daiki Inaba and Muhammad Yone in eight-man tag team action. Next up, Yo-Hey and Tadasuke picked up a victory over Hajime Ohara and Shuji Kondo. In the third preshow match, Takashi Sugiura, Manabu Soya and Masa Kitamiya defeated Kazuyuki Fujita, Hideki Suzuki) and Shuhei Taniguchi in six-man tag team action. In the first main card bout, Daga defeated Junta Miyawaki in singles competition. Next up, Kenoh and Lance Anoa'i defeated Katsuhiko Nakajima and Adam Brooks. In the sixth match, Kaito Kiyomiya, Ryohei Oiwa and Eita picked up a win over Naomichi Marufuji, Yoshinari Ogawa and Leona by disqualification. Next up, Jack Morris and Anthony Greene defeated Timothy Thatcher and Saxon Huxley to win the GHC Tag Team Championship, ending the latter team's reign on their second defense attempt. Next up, Dragon Bane and Alpha Wolf defeated Ninja Mack and Alejandro to win the vacant GHC Junior Heavyweight Tag Team Championship. Next up, El Hijo de Dr. Wagner Jr. defeated Psycho Clown to secure the sixth consecutive defense of the GHC National Championship in that respective reign. In the semi main event, Hayata defeated Seiki Yoshioka to secure the fourth consecutive defense of the GHC Junior Heavyweight Championship in that respective reign. After the bout concluded, Daga attacked Hayata and laid a challenge for the title.

In the main event, Jake Lee defeated 2023 N-1 Victory winner Go Shiozaki to secure his fourth consecutive defense of the GHC Heavyweight Championship. Lee appointed Kenoh as his next challenger after the bout concluded.

== Results ==
No.	Results	Stipulations	Times
1^{P}	Taishi Ozawa, Stallion Rogers, Atsushi Kotoge and Akitoshi Saito defeated Yu Owada, Hi69, Daiki Inaba and Muhammad Yone	Eight-man tag team match	8:09
2^{P}	Good Looking Guys (Yo-Hey and Tadasuke) defeated Hajime Ohara and Shuji Kondo	Tag team match	9:22
3^{P}	Takashi Sugiura, Manabu Soya and Masa Kitamiya defeated Real (Hideki Suzuki and Shuhei Taniguchi) and Kazuyuki Fujita	Six-man tag team match	11:41
4	Daga defeated Junta Miyawaki	Singles match	7:45
5	Kenoh and Lance Anoa'i defeated Katsuhiko Nakajima and Adam Brooks	Tag team match	13:21
6	Kaito Kiyomiya, Ryohei Oiwa and Eita defeated Naomichi Marufuji, Yoshinari Ogawa and Leona by disqualification	Six-man tag team match	14:24
7	Good Looking Guys (Jack Morris and Anthony Greene) defeated Real (Timothy Thatcher and Saxon Huxley) (c)	Tag team match for the GHC Tag Team Championship	17:38
8	Los Golpeadores (Dragón Bane and Alpha Wolf) defeated Ninja Mack and Alejandro	Tag team match for the vacant GHC Junior Heavyweight Tag Team Championship	18:12
9	El Hijo de Dr. Wagner Jr. (c) defeated Psycho Clown	Singles match for the GHC National Championship	21:07
10	Hayata (c) defeated Seiki Yoshioka	Singles match for the GHC Junior Heavyweight Championship	18:49
11	Jake Lee (c) defeated Go Shiozaki	Singles match for the GHC Heavyweight Championship	21:06
(c) / – the champion(s) heading into the match; P / – the match was broadcast on the pre-show
