= Noah Great Journey in Nagoya 2023 =

2023 Pro Wrestling Noah event

NOAH Green Journey in Nagoya 2023
- Promotional poster featuring Jake Lee and Takashi Sugiura
- Promotion: CyberFight
- Brand: Pro Wrestling Noah
- Date: June 17, 2023
- City: Nagoya, Japan
- Venue: Nagoya Congress Center
- Attendance: 833

Pay-per-view chronology
← Previous; Majestic 2023	Next → N-1 Victory 2023

NOAH Green Journey in Nagoya 2023 was a professional wrestling event promoted by CyberFight's sub-brand Pro Wrestling Noah. It took place on June 17, 2023, in Nagoya, Japan, at the Nagoya Congress Center. The event aired on CyberAgent's AbemaTV online linear television service and CyberFight's streaming service Wrestle Universe.

Ten matches were contested at the event, including three on the pre-show, and three of Noah's five championships were on the line. The main event saw Jake Lee defeat Takashi Sugiura to retain the GHC Heavyweight Championship. Other top matches included Real (Timothy Thatcher and Saxon Huxley) defeating Masa Kitamiya and Yoshiki Inamura to retain the GHC Tag Team Championship, and Hayata defeated Dante Leon to retain the GHC Junior Heavyweight Championship.

== Production ==
=== Background ===
The event will feature ten professional wrestling matches that involve different wrestlers from pre-existing scripted feuds and storylines. Wrestlers portray villains, heroes, or less distinguishable characters in scripted events that build tension and culminate in a wrestling match or series of matches.

=== Event ===
The preshow contained three bouts which were broadcast live on Noah's YouTube channel. The first match started with the confrontation between the team of Akitoshi Saito, Seiki Yoshioka and Stallion Rogers, and Muhammad Yone, Alejandro and Super Crazy, solded with the victory of the initial trio as a result of six-man tag team action. Next up, Kongo stablemates Hi69 and Hajime Ohara battled in singles competition with the victory of the latter. The third preshow bout saw Kaito Kiyomiya, Amakusa and Super Crazy picking up a victory over GHC National Champion El Hijo de Dr. Wagner Jr., Yoshinari Ogawa and Kai Fujimura. In the first main card bout, Hideki Suzuki defeated Shuhei Taniguchi in singles action. After the bout concluded, Suzuki grabbed a "Real" t-shirt, looked to be putting it on, but then handed it to Taniguchi, who snatched it from him, and then put it on, signifying that he had joined the stable. Next up, Daiki Inaba and Atsushi Kotoge defeated Naomichi Marufuji and Eita. In the sixth bout, Jack Morris, Tadasuke and Yo-Hey defeated Sean Legacy, Chris Ridgeway and Daga in six-man tag team action. Next up, Go Shiozaki and Katsuhiko Nakajima defeated Kenoh and Manabu Soya. In the eighth bout, Hayata defeated Dante Leon to secure the second consecutive title defense of the GHC Junior Heavyweight Championship in that respective reign. In the semi main event, Timothy Thatcher and Saxon Huxley defeated Masa Kitamiya and Yoshiki Inamura to secure their first defense of the GHC Tag Team Championship.

In the main event, Jake Lee defeated Takashi Sugiura to secure the third consecutive defense of the GHC Heavyweight Championship in that respective reign.

== Results ==
No.	Results	Stipulations	Times
1^{P}	Akitoshi Saito, Seiki Yoshioka and Stallion Rogers defeated Muhammad Yone, Alejandro and Taishi Ozawa	Six-man tag team match	7:42
2^{P}	Hajime Ohara defeated Hi69	Singles match	7:44
3^{P}	Kaito Kiyomiya, Amakusa and Super Crazy (Note: Junta Miyawaki was replaced by Super Crazy.) defeated El Hijo de Dr. Wagner Jr., Yoshinari Ogawa and Kai Fujimura	Six-man tag team match	13:25
4	Hideki Suzuki defeated Shuhei Taniguchi	Singles match	6:56
5	Daiki Inaba and Atsushi Kotoge defeated Naomichi Marufuji and Eita	Tag team match	10:00
6	Good Looking Guys (Jack Morris, Tadasuke and Yo-Hey) defeated Stinger (Chris Ridgeway and Daga) and Sean Legacy	Six-man tag team match	12:34
7	Go Shiozaki and Katsuhiko Nakajima defeated Kongo (Kenoh and Manabu Soya)	Tag team match	12:19
8	Hayata (c) defeated Dante Leon	Singles match for the GHC Junior Heavyweight Championship	19:03
9	Real (Timothy Thatcher and Saxon Huxley) (c) defeated Masa Kitamiya and Yoshiki Inamura	Tag team match for the GHC Tag Team Championship	17:06
10	Jake Lee (c) defeated Takashi Sugiura	Singles match for the GHC Heavyweight Championship	30:28
(c) / – the champion(s) heading into the match; P / – the match was broadcast on the pre-show
