= Noah Majestic 2023 =

2023 Pro Wrestling Noah event

NOAH Majestic 2023
- Promotional poster featuring Jake Lee and Naomichi Marufuji
- Promotion: CyberFight
- Brand: Pro Wrestling Noah
- Date: May 4, 2023
- City: Tokyo, Japan
- Venue: Ryōgoku Kokugikan
- Attendance: 2,721

Pay-per-view chronology
← Previous; Green Journey in Sendai 2023	Next → Great Journey in Nagoya 2023

NOAH Majestic chronology
← Previous; 2022	Next → —

NOAH Majestic 2023 was a professional wrestling event promoted by CyberFight's sub-brand Pro Wrestling Noah. It took place on May 4, 2023, in Tokyo, Japan, at the Ryōgoku Kokugikan. The event aired on CyberAgent's AbemaTV online linear television service and CyberFight's streaming service Wrestle Universe.

Fourteen matches were contested at the event, including three on the pre-show, and four of Noah's five championships were on the line. The main event saw Jake Lee defeat Naomichi Marufuji to retain the GHC Heavyweight Championship. Other top matches included El Hijo de Dr. Wagner Jr. successfully defending the GHC National Championship against Hideki Suzuki, Hayata defeated Ninja Mack to retain the GHC Junior Heavyweight Championship, and Real (Timothy Thatcher and Saxon Huxley) defeated Takashi Sugiura and Shuhei Taniguchi to win the GHC Tag Team Championship.

== Production ==
=== Background ===
The event featured fourteen professional wrestling matches that involve different wrestlers from pre-existing scripted feuds and storylines. Wrestlers portray villains, heroes, or less distinguishable characters in scripted events that build tension and culminate in a wrestling match or series of matches.

=== Event ===
The preshow included three matches which were broadcast live on Noah's YouTube channel. In the first bout, Super Crazy and Mohammed Yone picked up a win over Akitoshi Saito and Daishi Ozawa. Next, Atsushi Kotoge and Seiki Yoshioka defeated Extreme Tiger and Lanzeloth in tag team action. The third bout saw the confrontation between Sean Legacy, Stallion Rogers and Los Golpeadores (Dragon Bane and Alpha Wolf), and Jack Morris, Anthony Greene, Tadasuke and Yo-Hey, solded with the victory of the latter team.

The first bout of the main card saw a joshi confrontation in which Sumire Natsu and Ryo Mizunami picked up a victory over Maya Yukihi and Saki. Next up, Shuji Kondo, Hajime Ohara and Hi69 outmatched the team of Amakusa, Junta Miyawaki and Alejandro in six-man tag team action. In the sixth match, Kazuyuki Fujita and Masato Tanaka defeated Masa Kitamiya and Daiki Inaba. The seventh bout saw Masakatsu Funaki defeating Shinya Aoki with an ankle lock in a Martial arts rules match. In the eighth match, Yoshinari Ogawa and Chris Ridgeway picked up a victory over Ogawa's former tag partner Eita, and Daga. During the match, Daga betrayed Eita and joined Stinger. Next up, Dralístico defeated Rey Escorpión in singles competition. In the tenth bout, Timothy Thatcher and Saxon Huxley defeated Sugiura-gun stablemate Takashi Sugiura and Shuhei Taniguchi to become the new GHC Tag Team Champions, ending the latter team's reign at their first defense. Next, Hayata defeated Ninja Mack to secure his first defense of the GHC Junior Heavyweight Championship in that respective reign. Next, El Hijo de Dr. Wagner Jr. successfully defended the GHC National Championship against Hideki Suzuki for the fourth time in that respective reign. The semi main event portraited the return match of Go Shiozaki which came back from injury and teamed up with Kaito Kiyomiya) and Yoshiki Inamura in a losing effort against Kongo's Kenoh, Katsuhiko Nakajima and Manabu Soya.

In the main event, Jake Lee defeated Naomichi Marufuji to secure the second successful defense of the GHC Heavyweight Championship in that respective reign.

== Results ==
No.	Results	Stipulations	Times
1^{P}	Super Crazy and Mohammed Yone defeated Akitoshi Saito and Taishi Ozawa	Tag team match	10:58
2^{P}	Atsushi Kotoge and Seiki Yoshioka defeated Extreme Tiger and Lanzeloth	Tag team match	12:42
3^{P}	Good Looking Guys (Jack Morris, Anthony Greene, Tadasuke and Yo-Hey) defeated Sean Legacy, Stallion Rogers and Los Golpeadores (Dragón Bane and Alpha Wolf)	Eight-man tag team match	9:38
4	Sumire Natsu and Ryo Mizunami defeated Maya Yukihi and Saki	Tag team match	13:57
5	Kongo (Shuji Kondo, Hajime Ohara and Hi69) defeated Amakusa, Junta Miyawaki and Alejandro	Six-man tag team match	7:29
6	Kazuyuki Fujita and Masato Tanaka defeated Masa Kitamiya and Daiki Inaba	Tag team match	9:35
7	Masakatsu Funaki defeated Shinya Aoki by submission	Martial arts rules match	6:10
8	Stinger (Yoshinari Ogawa and Chris Ridgeway) defeated Eita and Daga	Tag team match	12:34
9	Dralístico defeated Rey Escorpión	Singles match	15:58
10	Real (Timothy Thatcher and Saxon Huxley) defeated Takashi Sugiura and Shuhei Taniguchi (c)	Tag team match for the GHC Tag Team Championship	15:24
11	Hayata (c) defeated Ninja Mack	Singles match for the GHC Junior Heavyweight Championship	12:34
12	El Hijo de Dr. Wagner Jr. (c) defeated Hideki Suzuki	Singles match for the GHC National Championship	12:17
13	Kongo (Kenoh, Katsuhiko Nakajima and Manabu Soya) defeated Go-Kai (Go Shiozaki and Kaito Kiyomiya) and Yoshiki Inamura	Six-man tag team match	16:47
14	Jake Lee (c) defeated Naomichi Marufuji	Singles match for the GHC Heavyweight Championship	25:28
(c) / – the champion(s) heading into the match; P / – the match was broadcast on the pre-show
