= Real (professional wrestling) =

Professional wrestling stable

- Official logo of the stable (2023–2025)

Stable
- Members: See below
- Debut: April 22, 2023
- Disbanded: March 22, 2025
- Years active: 2023–2025

Real (レアル, Rearu) (often stylized in capital letters as REAL) was a Japanese professional wrestling stable based in the Pro Wrestling Noah (Noah) promotion. The unit was only led by Hideki Suzuki and also consisted of Timothy Thatcher, Shuhei Taniguchi and Kazuyuki Fujita. The stable represented an offshoot of Sugiura-gun.

== History ==
=== Under Hideki Suzuki's leadership. (2023–2025) ===
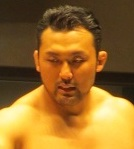
The only leader of the stable, Hideki Suzuki.

At Noah Green Journey in Sendai 2023 on April 16, Hideki Suzuki, Timothy Thatcher and Saxon Huxley defeated Yoshiki Inamura, Kinya Okada and Sean Legacy in six-man tag team competition. After the relationship between Sugiura-gun members fizzled out over the previous months, Hideki Suzuki stated that the unit wasn't working and was over, leading Takashi Sugiura to confirm that the stable had disbanded. On April 22, 2023, at Noah Sunny Voyage, following their departure from Sugiura-gun, Suzuki, Thatcher and Huxley subsequently named their new unit as "Real", with Suzuki being appointed the leader.

Not long after their split from Sugiura-gun, the original members of Real began feuds with ex-Sugiura-gun stablemates. At Noah Majestic 2023 on May 4, Timothy Thatcher and Saxon Huxley defeated Takashi Sugiura and Shuhei Taniguchi to win the GHC Tag Team Championship and Hideki Suzuki unsuccessfully challenged El Hijo de Dr. Wagner Jr. for the GHC National Championship. At Noah Great Journey in Nagoya 2023 on June 17, Hideki Suzuki defeated Shuhei Taniguchi in singles action. After the bout concluded, Suzuki grabbed a "Real" t-shirt, looked to be putting it on, but then handed it to Taniguchi, who snatched it from him, and then put it on, signifying that he had joined the stable. Timothy Thatcher and Saxon Huxley successfully defended the GHC Tag Team Championship against Masa Kitamiya and Yoshiki Inamura later that night. In the 2023 edition of the N-1 Victory, Thatcher and Huxley competed in separate blocks, failing to qualify into the finals. At Noah Grand Ship In Nagoya 2023 on September 24, Hideki Suzuki and Shuhei Taniguchi teamed up with Kazushi Sakuraba in a losing effort against Takashi Sugiura, Manabu Soya and Masa Kitamiya in six-man tag team competition, and Timothy Thatcher and Saxon Huxley dropped the GHC tag team titles to Good Looking Guys (Jack Morris and Anthony Greene). At Noah Demolition Stage In Fukuoka 2023 on October 28, Hideki Suzuki, Saxon Huxley and Shuhei Taniguchi defeated Masa Kitamiya, Manabu Soya and Daiki Inaba in six-man tag team action.

On the first night of Noah Star Navigation 2024 from January 13, Shuhei Taniguchi defeated Ulka Sasaki in singles competition. At Noah Cross Over in Sendai 2024 on February 4, Saxon Huxley, Timothy Thatcher and Shuhei Taniguchi fell short to Naomichi Marufuji, Takashi Sugiura and Ulka Sasaki. On the second night of Noah Star Navigation 2024 from February 23, Thatcher and Huxley teamed up with Manabu Soya and Shuji Kondo to defeat Kenoh, Kaito Kiyomiya, Ryohei Oiwa and Yu Owada. Ay Noah Great Voyage in Yokohama 2024 on March 17, Thatcher and Huxley unsuccessfully challenged Good Looking Guys (Jack Morris and Anthony Greene) for the GHC Tag Team Championship. At Noah Wrestle Magic on May 4, 2024, Shuhei Tanicughi teamed up with Hikaru Sato in a losing effort against Ulka Sasaki and Kazushi Sakuraba as a result of a UWF Rules tag team match.

== Members ==
*	Founding member
I	Leader

Member		Joined	Left
Hideki Suzuki	I*	April 22, 2023	March 22, 2025
Timothy Thatcher	*	April 22, 2023	March 22, 2025
Shuhei Taniguchi		June 17, 2023	March 22, 2025
Kazuyuki Fujita		June 22, 2023	March 22, 2025
Saxon Huxley	*	April 22, 2023	March 22, 2025

== Championships and accomplishments ==
- Pro Wrestling Noah
  - GHC Tag Team Championship (1 time) – Thatcher and Huxley
- Pro Wrestling Illustrated
  - Singles wrestlers
    - Ranked Thatcher No. 265 of the top 500 singles wrestlers in the PWI 500 of 2023
  - Tag team wrestlers
    - Ranked Thatcher and Huxley No. 79 of the top 100 tag teams in the PWI Tag Team 100 of 2023
- Tenryu Project
  - United National Tag Team Championship (1 time) – Suzuki with Hikaru Sato (Note: Sato was considered an associate of the stable during this reign.)
