= Noah The Best 2022 =

2022 Pro Wrestling Noah event

NOAH The Best 2022
- Promotional poster featuring El Hijo del Dr. Wagner Jr. and Yoshiki Inamura
- Promotion: CyberFight
- Brand(s): Pro Wrestling Noah
- Date: November 23, 2022
- City: Tokyo, Japan
- Venue: Yoyogi National Gymnasium
- Attendance: 872

Pay-per-view chronology
← Previous; Global Honored Crown	Next → N Innovation

Noah The Best chronology
← Previous; 2021	Next → —

NOAH The Best 2022 was a professional wrestling event promoted by CyberFight's sub-brand Pro Wrestling Noah. It took place on November 23, 2022, in Tokyo, Japan, at the Yoyogi National Gymnasium. The event aired on CyberAgent's AbemaTV online linear television service and CyberFight's streaming service Wrestle Universe.

Eight matches were contested at the event, and two of Noah's five championships were on the line. The main event saw El Hijo del Dr. Wagner Jr. defeat Yoshiki Inamura to retain the GHC National Championship. In another prominent match, Full Throttle (Atsushi Kotoge and Seiki Yoshioka) defeated Kongo stablemates Hajime Ohara and Shuji Kondo to win the GHC Junior Heavyweight Tag Team Championship.

== Background ==
=== Storylines ===
The event featured eight professional wrestling matches that resulted from scripted storylines, where wrestlers portrayed villains, heroes, or less distinguishable characters in the scripted events that built tension and culminated in a wrestling match or series of matches.

=== Event ===
Event started with the confrontation between Funky Express (Akitoshi Saito and Mohammed Yone) and Kongo (Hi69 and Tadasuke) solded with the victory of the preceding team. Next, Hideki Suzuki defeated Shuhei Taniguchi in singles action. The third match saw Jack Morris picking up a victory over Daiki Inaba in singles competition as well. The fourth bout portraited Masaaki Mochizuki, Masato Tanaka and Naomichi Marufuji picking up a victory against Sugiura-gun (Kazuyuki Fujita, Takashi Sugiura and Timothy Thatcher). Next, Alejandro and Amakusa defeated Dante Leon and Yo-Hey in tag team action. In the sixth match, Kaito Kiyomiya, Masa Kitamiya and Satoshi Kojima defeated Kongo (Katsuhiko Nakajima, Kenoh and Manabu Soya). In the semi main event, Atsushi Kotoge and Seiki Yoshioka defeated Kongo's Hajime Ohara and Shuji Kondo to win the GHC Junior Heavyweight Tag Team Championship, ending the latter team's reign at 13 days and no defenses.

The main event portraited the confrontation between the reigning champion El Hijo del Dr. Wagner Jr. and Yoshiki Inamura in which the title holder marked his first successful defense of the GHC National Championship in that respective reign.

== Results ==
No.	Results	Stipulations	Times
1	Funky Express (Akitoshi Saito and Mohammed Yone) defeated Kongo (Hi69 and Tadasuke) by pinfall	Tag team match	10:22
2	Hideki Suzuki defeated Shuhei Taniguchi by pinfall	Singles match	12:56
3	Jack Morris defeated Daiki Inaba by pinfall	Singles match	13:54
4	Masaaki Mochizuki, Masato Tanaka and Naomichi Marufuji defeated Sugiura-gun (Kazuyuki Fujita, Takashi Sugiura and Timothy Thatcher) by pinfall	Six-man tag team match	17:27
5	Alejandro and Amakusa defeated Dante Leon and Yo-Hey by pinfall	Tag team match	11:13
6	Kaito Kiyomiya, Masa Kitamiya and Satoshi Kojima defeated Kongo (Katsuhiko Nakajima, Kenoh and Manabu Soya) by pinfall	Six-man tag team match	18:06
7	Full Throttle (Atsushi Kotoge and Seiki Yoshioka) defeated Kongo (Hajime Ohara and Shuji Kondo) (c) by pinfall	Tag team match for the GHC Junior Heavyweight Tag Team Championship	23:40
8	El Hijo del Dr. Wagner Jr. (c) defeated Yoshiki Inamura by pinfall	Singles match for the GHC National Championship	26:02
(c) / – the champion(s) heading into the match
