= Noah Great Voyage in Yokohama 2024 =

2024 Pro Wrestling Noah event

NOAH Great Voyage in Yokohama
- Promotional poster featuring various wrestlers
- Promotion: CyberFight
- Brand: Pro Wrestling Noah
- Date: March 17, 2024
- City: Yokohama, Japan
- Venue: Yokohama Budokan
- Attendance: 977

Pay-per-view chronology
← Previous; Noah Star Navigation 2024 (Night 2)	Next → Noah Star Navigation 2024 (Night 3)

Great Voyage in Yokohama chronology
← Previous; 2023	Next → —

NOAH Great Voyage in Yokohama 2024 was a professional wrestling event promoted by CyberFight's sub-brand Pro Wrestling Noah and took place on March 17, 2024, in Yokohama, Japan, at the Yokohama Budokan. Broadcasting was on CyberAgent's AbemaTV online linear television service and CyberFight's streaming service Wrestle Universe.

Eight matches were contested at the event, including three on the pre-show, and two of Noah's six championships were on the line. The main event saw Good Looking Guys (Jack Morris and Anthony Greene) defeat Real (Saxon Huxley and Timothy Thatcher) to retain the GHC Tag Team Championship.

== Background ==
=== Storylines ===
The event featured eight professional wrestling matches that resulted from scripted storylines, where wrestlers portrayed villains, heroes, or less distinguishable characters in the scripted events that built tension and culminated in a wrestling match or series of matches.

=== Event ===
The show started with three pre-show bouts broadcast live on Noah's YouTube channel. In the first one, Hayata, Ninja Mack and Alejandro picked up a victory over Dragón Bane, Alpha Wolf and Super Crazy in six-man tag team action. In the second and third one, Daiki Inaba defeated Shuhei Taniguchi and LJ Cleary defeated Hajime Ohara both in singles competition.

In the first main card bout, GHC Heavyweight Champion El Hijo de Dr. Wagner Jr. and Shuji Kondo defeated Jake Lee and Tadasuke in tag team action. After the bout concluded, Lee laid a challenge for Wagner's Heavyweight Championship in a match which was set to take place at Star Navigation Tokyo on March 31, 2024. Next up, Kenoh outmatched Ulka Sasaki by count-out in singles competition. The sixth match saw the team of Naomichi Marufuji, Takashi Sugiura, Yoshinari Ogawa, Junta Miyawaki and Yu Owada coming out victorious from a ten-man elimination tag team match against Go Shiozaki, Mohammed Yone, Akitoshi Saito, Atsushi Kotoge and Hi69 which Marufuji won by last eliminating Shiozaki. In the semi main event, Daga defeated one half of the GHC Junior Heavyweight Tag Team Champions Yo-Hey to secure the fifth consecutive defense of the GHC Junior Heavyweight Championship in that respective reign.

In the main event, GHC National Champion Jack Morris and Anthony Greene defeated Saxon Huxley and Timothy Thatcher to secure the fourth consecutive defense of the GHC Tag Team Championship in that respective reign. Huxley and Thatcher replaced Victory Challenge Tag League winners and rightful contenders Kaito Kiyomiya and Ryohei Oiwa due to Kiyomiya sidelining with injury. Huxley and Thatcher finished the tag league as runners-up, hence their presence into the match.

== Results ==
No.	Results	Stipulations	Times
1^{P}	Hayata, Ninja Mack and Alejandro defeated Los Golpeadores (Dragón Bane and Alpha Wolf) and Super Crazy by pinfall	Six-man tag team match	11:21
2^{P}	Daiki Inaba defeated Shuhei Taniguchi by pinfall	Six-man tag team match	8:44
3^{P}	LJ Cleary defeated Hajime Ohara by pinfall	Singles match	7:22
4	El Hijo de Dr. Wagner Jr. and Shuji Kondo defeated Good Looking Guys (Jake Lee and Tadasuke) by pinfall	Tag team match	15:01
5	Kenoh defeated Ulka Sasaki by countout	Singles match	11:38
6	Naomichi Marufuji, Takashi Sugiura, Yoshinari Ogawa, Junta Miyawaki and Yu Owada defeated Team Noah (Go Shiozaki, Mohammed Yone, Akitoshi Saito, Atsushi Kotoge and Hi69) by pinfall	Ten-man tag team elimination match	22:17
7	Daga (c) defeated Yo-Hey by pinfall	Singles match for the GHC Junior Heavyweight Championship	14:49
8	Good Looking Guys (Jack Morris and Anthony Greene) (c) defeated Real (Saxon Huxley and Timothy Thatcher) (Note: Huxley and Thatcher replaced Kaito Kiyomiya and Ryohei Oiwa.) by pinfall	Tag team match for the GHC Tag Team Championship	21:30
(c) / – the champion(s) heading into the match; P / – the match was broadcast on the pre-show
