= Eita (wrestler) =

Japanese professional wrestler

Eita Kobayashi
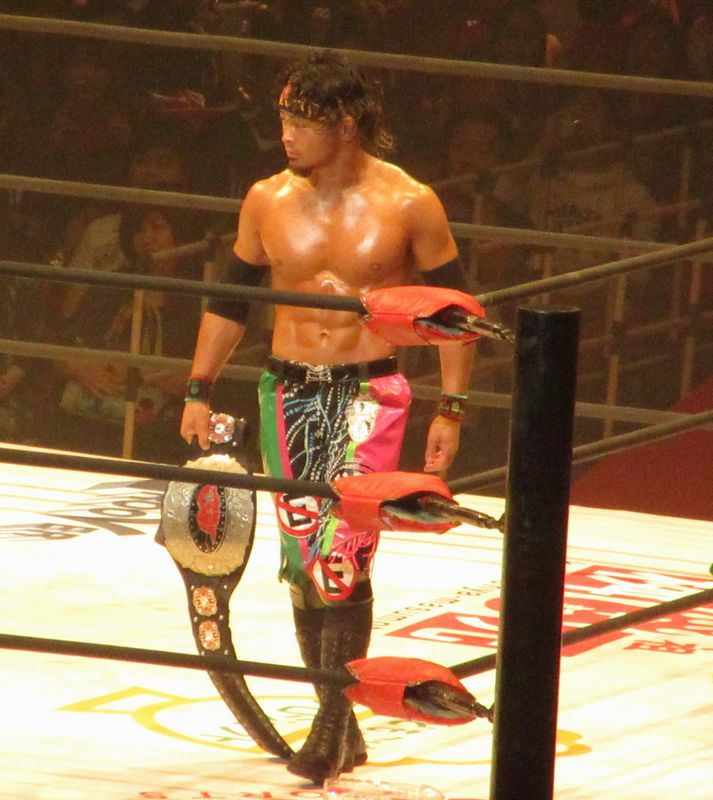
- Eita in November 2016

Personal information
- Born: October 27, 1991 (age 35) Nagano, Japan

Professional wrestling career
- Ring name(s): Eita; Eita Kobayashi
- Billed height: 1.70 m (5 ft 7 in)
- Billed weight: 80 kg (180 lb)
- Trained by: Dragon Gate Nex; Dragon Kid
- Debut: January 26, 2011

Eita Kobayashi (小林 瑛太, Kobayashi Eita; born October 27, 1991), known mononymously as Eita, is a Japanese professional wrestler currently signed to Pro Wrestling NOAH. The majority of his career was spent in DragonGate, where he was best known as the former leader of the villainous Real Extreme Diffusion (R・E・D) stable, in which he led the stable for nearly its entire run. As part of his current persona as a narcissist, he is known as Numero Uno (number one in Spanish).

In Dragon Gate, he has been a one-time Open the Dream Gate Champion, a two-time Open the Brave Gate Champion, five-time Open the Twin Gate Champion, two-time Open the Triangle Gate Champion, as well as the 2020 King of Gate winner. Outside of Dragon Gate, Kobayashi has worked matches for their United States–based sister company Dragon Gate USA, and as part of his wrestling training, for Mexican promotion International Wrestling Revolution Group (IWRG).

== Professional wrestling career ==
=== Dragon Gate (2011–2012) ===
Kobayashi trained for his professional wrestling career in the Japanese promotion Dragon Gate's wrestling school called "Dragon Gate Nex" and made his debut on January 26, 2011, at Dragon Gate Nex's Sanctuary.71 show in Kobe, Hyogo, Japan, wrestling to a draw against fellow trainee Yosuke Watanabe. He later "graduated" to the main Dragon Gate shows as a low ranking rookie. On February 20, 2012, he was one of 10 wrestlers fighting to become the number one contender for the Open the Dream Gate Championship, but saw himself defeated by Pac. A few weeks later he was involved it yet another number one contenders match for the Dream Gate title, but this time the match was won by Cyber Kong. While Kobayashi did not win a lot of matches he made a name for himself with his ability to execute the knife edge chop on opponents with such force that it makes a very loud sound on impact, partially by actually hitting opponents with full force instead of the normal, more "theatrical" version used in professional wrestling. His Chopping prowess and that of other Dragon Gate wrestlers led Dragon Gate to hold a "King of Chop" tournament, which was not a wrestling tournament but a tournament where two wrestlers used the knife edge chop on each other and the fans determined the winner of each match up. Kobayashi defeated Mondai Ruy, Cyber Kong and Don Fujii on his way to the finals where he also overcame Tomahawk T.T. to become Dragon Gate's "King of Chop". As a result of his victory Eita Kobayashi was allowed to compete in Dragon Gate's annual "King of Gate" tournament, where he was eliminated in the second round by Masaaki Mochizuki. On May 27, 2012, Eita Kobayashi teamed up with Don Fujii to lose to Akatsuki, the team of Shingo Takagi and Yamato in what turned out to be his last Dragon Gate match of 2012.

=== International (2012–2013) ===
Four days after his last match for Dragon Gate Eita made his debut for the Mexican International Wrestling Revolution Group (IWRG) promotion as part of their annual Rey del Ring ("King of the Ring") tournament. His ring name was shortened to simply "Eita" as he worked as a masked heel, a wrestler who portrays the bad guys, while in Mexico to gain experience with more styles of wrestling, something not uncommon for young Japanese wrestlers. He began carrying a green drum with him to the ring that he would bang before the match to annoy his opponents and also use as an actual weapon during the match. Eita worked a number of IWRG's annual featured shows, such as the 2012 Legado Final ("Final Legacy") where he teamed up with Imposible to defeat Centvrion and Charly Madrid. He was also part of IWRG's 2012 Festival de las Máscaras, he, Imposible and Comando Negro defeated the team of Centvrion, Matrix, Jr. and Panterita. He also began to work for Desastre Total Ultraviolento (DTU) that promoted shows around the same area as IWRG did. On August 17, 2012, he participated in the DTU Rey del Raquetazo ("King of the Chop") tournament. In the first round he defeated Gemelo Fantastico I but lost to Comando Negro in the second round of the tournament. A few weeks later he won the vacant DTU Alto Rendimiento ("High Performance") Championship as he outlasted Dinastía, Eterno, Flamita, Principe Halcón, Rocky Lobo and Tribal. In late 2012 Eita worked for Dragon Gate's North American sister company Dragon Gate USA (DGUSA), appearing on three of their Pay-per-view (PPV) events on October 21 and November 2 through 4th, losing all four matches including a match for Dragon Gate's Open the Brave Gate Championship against champion Dragon Kid. A few weeks later he participated in an IWRG promoted tournament for the vacant WWS World Welterweight Championship. He defeated Alan Extreme in the first round but was defeated by eventual tournament winner Cerebro Negro in the second round. The following day he challenged for the Cruiserweight Championship against champion Daga but did not win the match. For IWRG's 2012 Prison Fatal show he teamed up with Alan Extreme and Carta Brava, Jr. to defeat the team of Avisman, Cerebro Negro and Dinamic Black. He also had the chance to represent IWRG's wrestling school in a series of matches against Fuerza Guerrera's Gimnasio Konkreto school at the Arena Naucalpan 35th Anniversary Show and again at the IWRG 16th Anniversary Show, with Gimnasio Konkreto winning both matches.

On January 17, 2013, Eita was teamed up with longtime wrestler Negro Navarro for IWRG's annual El Protector tournament, a tournament where a rookie and a "veteran" are teamed up for a tag team tournament designed to give the rookie the spotlight. The duo defeated Canis Lupus and Pirata Morgan in the first round, then defeated Centvrion and Veneno in the semi-finals of the tournament only to lose to Carta Brava, Jr. and X-Fly in the finals. Eita also worked for DGUSA again, working three PPV tapings from January 25 to January 27, losing all three matches. On February 19, 2013, Flamita defeated Eita to win the DTU Alto Rendimiento Championship. In late February "King of Chop" rival Tomahawk came to IWRG to train, the same way Eita had come to Mexico 9 months previous and the two began to work as a regular team on IWRG events. On March 16, 2013, Eita, Fénix, Freelance and Mike Segura defeated the tema of Cerebro Negro, Dr. Cerebro, Kaving and Kortiz on a show that was supposed to be the retirement of Kaving and Kortiz's father Ray Mendoza, Jr. On July 19, Eita made an appearance for AAA, representing the Los Perros del Mal stable in a six-man tag team match, where he, Daga and Psicosis were defeated by Dark Cuervo, Dark Espíritu and Dark Ozz.

=== Return to Dragon Gate (2013–2023) ===
On July 21, 2013, Eita, T-Hawk and U-T, forming a new stable named Millennials, announced their impending return to Dragon Gate. The stable made its debut appearance on August 23 at The Gate of Generation. During September, Eita and T-Hawk won the 2013 Summer Adventure Tag League, defeating BxB Hulk and Yamato in the finals on September 28 to become the interim Open the Twin Gate Champions. On November 3, Eita and T-Hawk defeated previous champions, Dragon Kid and K-ness, to become the official Open the Twin Gate Champions. On December 5, Eita, T-Hawk and one of Millennials' newest members, Mexican wrestler Flamita, defeated Mad Blankey (BxB Hulk, Cyber Kong and Yamato) to win the Open the Triangle Gate Championship. However, just three days later, Eita and T-Hawk lost the Open the Twin Gate Championship to Naruki Doi and Yamato. On December 22, Millennials lost the Open the Triangle Gate Championship to the Jimmyz (Jimmy Susumu, Mr. Kyu Kyu Naoki Tanizaki Toyonaka Dolphin and Ryo "Jimmy" Saito) in a three-way elimination match, which also included Oretachi Veteran-gun (Cima, Dragon Kid and Masaaki Mochizuki). On March 16, 2014, Eita, T-Hawk and U-T defeated the Jimmyz (Jimmy Kanda, Jimmy Susumu and Mr. Kyu Kyu Naoki Tanizaki Toyonaka Dolphin) to win the Open the Triangle Gate Championship. They lost the title to Mad Blankey (Cyber Kong, Kzy and Naruki Doi) on June 14. On July 20, Eita and T-Hawk defeated Akira Tozawa and Shingo Takagi to win the Open the Twin Gate Championship. They lost the title to Cima and Gamma on November 2, before regaining it on December 3. On December 28, they lost the title to Cyber Kong and Yamato. On August 6, 2015, Millennials lost a three-way match and were as a result forced to disband. Afterwards, Eita remained together with former Millennials stablemate Kotoka, with the two starting a feud with T-Hawk, whom they blamed for the dissolution of the stable. On September 23, 2015, Eita was betrayed by Kotoka and kicked out of the newly formed VerserK unit. On October 8, he formed a new unit with Cima, Gamma, Punch Tominaga, El Lindaman, and rookies Takehiro Yamamura and Kaito Ishida, which was named Over Generation on November 1. On June 12, 2016, Eita was selected to represent Dragon Gate in New Japan Pro-Wrestling's 2016 Super J-Cup. On July 20, he was eliminated from the tournament in the first round by Jyushin Thunder Liger. On July 24, Eita defeated Yosuke♥Santa Maria to become Open the Brave Gate Champion, his first singles championship with the promotion. On September 22 at "Dangerous Gate", Eita defeated brother YASSHI for his first title defense. On October 12, Eita defeated El Lindaman, marking his second defense. Eita defeated Flamita November 3, for his third title defense.

On November 8 Eita rejoined VerserK after turning on Dragon Kid revealing to be their newest member, which led them to win Early Christmas Tag Team Tournament by defeating BxB Hulk and Kzy in the finals. On December 23 at Final Gate Eita and T-Hawk defeated CIMA and Susumu Yokosuka to win the vacant Open The Twin Gate Championship. On January 13, Eita along with the rest of the members of VerserK renamed the stable to ANTIAS. They lost the titles in their third title defense to Big R Shimizu and Ben-K on May 6 at Dead or Alive. Following the Dead or Alive, Eita took part in the King of Gate, finishing with a record of one win, one draw and two losses, finishing at last in his block. During the tournament, Eita renewed his feud with former tag partner and Open The Brave Gate Champion Dragon Kid, injuring him in their head-to-head match, which led to Kid forfeiting all of his round-robin matches. This led to Eita being part of a tournament to decide the last-placed wrestler in the tournament. The following weeks, Eita would attack Kid and pinned him on July 5 to force Over Generation to disband. On July 22, Eita defeated Kid to win the Open the Brave Gate Championship for the second time. On September 24 at Dangerous Gate, ANTIAS renamed themselves to R.E.D. Later that night, Eita lost the Open the Brave Gate Championship back to Dragon Kid. Eita and Kid's feud would culminate in a Mask vs. Hair match at Final Gate on December 23, where Kid defeated Eita, forcing him to shave his head.

Since January 16, during a match between R.E.D and MaxiMuM, Shimizu accidentally attacked Ben-K on two occasions which caused some tension between them. Shimizu had previously cost R.E.D a match, with the rest of R.E.D leaving the arena without him. Shimizu's mistakes would repeat during R.E.D's matches, leading Eita to accuse him of doing it on purpose, and blamed Ben-K and Shimizu for the loses and accused them of being incompetent. On February 5, tensions would come ahead between R.E.D and the rest of the other stables in Dragon Gate except MaxiMuM, Eita would criticize each stable weak point and agreed to a match with each other on March 7. Eita would nominate himself, PAC, Kazma Sakamoto and Yasushi Kanda for the match, leaving Shimizu arguing that Ben-K and himself should be in the match due to holding the Open The Twin Gate Championship. Five days later, Eita would accidentally hit Ben-K with a chair, costing his match against U-T. Shimizu blamed Eita for Ben-K's loss and demanded an explanation, but he refused claiming they were the ones who lost the match. Ben-K and Shimizu's errors led Eita to threaten to kick them out of the stable. Despite Big Ben, retaining the Open The Twin Gate Championship on March 3 at Champion Gate in Osaka, Eita warned them that he had no problems of kicking them out. On March 7, Tribe Vanguard won the four-way eight-man tag team elimination match, after Ben-K accidentally attacked Kanda. Shimizu would beg Eita to not kick them out of the stable, YAMATO would provoke Eita, leading him to berate the other units. General Manager Takayuki Yagi capitalized on the opportunity and announced the rules for the Steel Cage Survival match at Dead or Alive on May 6, as well as multiple tag team matches between members of the respective units to decide, which member would enter in the match. Eita would select Yoshida as his partner and their opponents would be Big Ben. On April 10, Big Ben defeated Eita and Yoshida, with Shimizu pinning Eita, to represent R.E.D in the match. Afterwards, Shimizu dared Eita to kick him out of the stable. Yoshida declared that he was not on Eita's side causing tensions in R.E.D, leading Sakamoto and Kanda to choose Eita's side, dividing the stable, which he was later joined by PAC. On April 28, Eita cost Ben-K and Shimizu against KAI and YAMATO, leading them to lose the Open the Twin Gate Championship. On May 6 at Dead or Alive, Eita and Ben-K lost to Kaito Ishida and Masato Yoshino. During the match, Ben-K refused to cooperate with Eita and later after some miscommunication, Ben-K attacked Eita, allowing Ishida and Yoshino to win the match. Later that night, after Shimizu lost the "Bonds" steel cage survival five-way match, Shimizu along with the rest of R.E.D turned on Ben-K, revealing that he was never planning on kicking Eita out, they were working together all this time, while also claiming that Eita was the leader. Later that month, Eita took part in the 2019 King of Gate, where he won his block with a clean record of five wins, advancing to the semifinals of the tournament. On June 6, Eita defeated KAI to advance to the finals of the tournament. Two days later, Eita was defeated his former R.E.D stablemate Ben-K in the finals to win the tournament. The following day, Eita and Shimizu interfered in a match between Tribe Vanguard (YAMATO and KAI) and MaxiMuM (Naruki Doi and Kaito Ishida), while also claiming to be the next challengers. Tribe Vanguard and MaxiMuM weren't satisfied with the conclusion of the match and all teams wanted to face each other in a rematch, leading General Manager Takayuki Yagi making the match official of the event. On July 21 at Kobe Pro-Wrestling Festival, Eita and Shimizu won the Open The Twin Gate Championship by defeating Tribe Vanguard (KAI and YAMATO) and MaxiMuM (Naruki Doi and Kaito Ishida) in a three-way match.

In September, Eita began feuding with Último Dragón, after he revealed Drágon as R.E.D's next target. On October 8, R.E.D lost to Dragón, Saito, Shisa and Darkness Dragon. Afterwards, R.E.D continued a series of matches between the two sides. During their feud, Yasushi Kanda turned on Eita, leaving R.E.D to join Drágon's side. On November 7, Eita and Shimizu faced Dragón and Kanda in losing effort, after Eita ripped Dragón's mask. Afterwards, General Manager Takayuki Yagi announced that Dragón and Eita would face each other on December 4 and if Eita won Dragón would be forced to leave the promotion. At the event on December 4, Eita lost to Dragón by disqualification, after removing Dragón's mask. Afterwards, R.E.D attacked Dragón until his former students Naruki Doi and Masato Yoshino made the save. The Green and Red Masked Demons were forced to a match, leading Eita, Red and Green Mask Demons to face Dragón, Doi, and Yoshino in a winning effort, after Kaito Ishida revealed himself to be the Green Masked Demon, turning on MaxiMuM. Eita announced that the Red Demon Mask would be revealed on December 18. On December 15 at Final Gate, Eita and Shimizu lost the Open The Twin Gate Championship to Tribe Vanguard (BxB Hulk and YAMATO). Three days later, BxB Hulk was revealed as the Red Masked Demon, after turning on YAMATO defecting from Tribe Vanguard to join R.E.D. Afterwards, R.E.D began a "Generation War" against Dragon Gate and Toryumon. From May 17 until June 7, Eita took part in the 2020 King of Gate, which he eventually won, defeating Open The Dream Gate Champion Naruki Doi in the finals on June 7. On August 2, at Memorial Gate in Wakayama, Eita defeated Naruki Doi to win the Open The Dream Gate Championship, to become the seventh and youngest Grand Slam champion in Dragon Gate's history. He lost the title to Shun Skywalker on November 15, at Kobe Pro-Wrestling Festival. In May 2021, Eita took part in the 2021 King of Gate, finishing the tournament with a record of two wins, one draw and one loss, failing to advance to the semifinals of the tournament.

=== Pro-Wrestling Noah (since 2021) ===
==== Perros del Mal de Japón (2021–2022) ====
On June 13, during an empty arena event of the Abema Premium Match Series, Eita made his Pro Wrestling NOAH (NOAH) debut after being revealed to be Nosawa Rongai and Ikuto Hidaka's mystery partner to fight Stinger, while it was announced that Eita would also be taking part in the Noah Jr. Rumble to crown the number one contender for the GHC Junior Heavyweight Championship. In the event, Eita failed to become the number one contender after being eliminated by Yoshinari Ogawa. On June 27, at Muta The World, the group was revealed to be the Los Perros del Mal de Japón, afterwards Eita along with Nosawa and Yo-Hey defeated Stinger (Yoshinari Ogawa, Seiki Yoshioka and Yuya Susumu). Afterwards, the group started a brawl between the two stables, with Kotaro Suzuki and Ikuto Hidaka coming to help, outnumbering Stinger and getting the upper hand on them.

On February 25, Eita and Rongai faced Daisuke Harada and Yo-Hey, who had recently been kicked out of Los Perros del Mal de Japón in a winning effort, with Eita winning the match for his team by scoring a direct pinfall over Harada. Afterwards, Eita proclaimed himself as Harada's next challenger to the GHC Junior Heavyweight Championship. On March 3, Eita and Maria defeated Hyo and Kento Miyahara. Afterwards, Maria was attacked by Hyo and Kento, before Eita made the save. Maria then persuaded Eita to form a team, before also challenging for the Open the Twin Gate Championship. On March 6, Eita and Yosuke♡Santa Maria. failed to win the Open The Twin Gate Championship in a three-way match involving Hyo and Kento and D'Courage (Dragon Dia and Yuki Yoshioka). On March 13 at Great Voyage in Yokohama, Eita defeated Daisuke Harada to win the GHC Junior Heavyweight Championship for the first time.

On April 25, one of the three Metal Warriors faced Minorita in a winning effort. After the match, the trio was revealed to be Eita, Nosawa Rongai and Kotaro Suzuki, who challenged Gold Class (Naruki Doi, Kaito Ishida and Kota Minoura) to a title match for the Open The Triangle Gate Championship. On April 29 at Majestic 2022: N Innovation, Eita lost the GHC Junior Heavyweight Championship to Hayata. The following day, Eita made his last match for the promotion, teaming with his Los Perros del Mal de Japon stablemates in a no contest against Stinger. On May 5 at Dead or Alive, Eita, Rongai and Kotaro Suzuki defeated Naruki Doi, Kaito Ishida and Kota Minoura to win the Open The Triangle Gate Championship. On May 11, Eita faced Shun Skywalker in a losing effort in the first round of the 2022 King of Gate. Later that month, Eita and Los Perros del Mal de Japon made a surprise return to NOAH, attacking Stinger members Chris Ridgeway, Yoshinari Ogawa, Seiki Yoshioka and Yuya Susumu, during a title match for the GHC Junior Heavyweight Tag Team Championship, before nominating them as their next challengers to the Open The Triangle Gate Championship. On June 7, Eita, Rongai and Suzuki lost the Open The Triangle Gate Championship to Stinger's Seiki Yoshioka, Yoshinari Ogawa and Yuya Susumu, before regaining the titles after defeating Atsushi Kotoge, Extreme Tiger, and Yo-Hey on June 23. They lost the titles to M3K (Masaaki Mochizuki, Mochizuki Junior and Susumu Mochizuki) on July 30 at Kobe Pro-Wrestling Festival. On November 23 at Noah the Best, after concluding their feud with Stinger's Yoshinari Ogawa, Nosawa Rongai decided to disband Los Perros del Mal de Japón, due to his eminent retirement from professional wrestling on February 21, 2023.

==== Teaming with Hayata (since 2022) ====
On December 23, 2022, Eita was announced as Yoshinari Ogawa's partner to challenge Kzy and Yo-Hey for the GHC Junior Heavyweight Tag Team Championship at NOAH The New Year on January 1, 2023. At the event, Eita and Ogawa defeated Kzy and YO-HEY to win the GHC Junior Heavyweight Tag Team Championship.

On March 21, Eita became a freelancer, after Dragon Gate changed Eita’s contract status, following negotiations between the two parties, after he had expressed his desire to expand his activities in other promotions, as the new terms would give him the flexibility to pursue those activities. Despite holding the GHC Junior Heavyweight Tag Team Championship with Ogawa, the two remained distant and their relationship quickly turned soured, as Ogawa turned on Eita after they lost the GHC Junior Heavyweight Tag Team Championship to Tadasuke and Yo-Hey on April 16 at Green Journey in Sendai. On May 4 at Majestic, Eita and Daga faced Ogawa and Chris Ridgeway. The match ended with Daga turning on Eita, and joining Stinger. Afterwards, Ogawa announced that he, Chris Ridgeway and Daga were the "new Stinger" and that Eita and Hayata where not considered members anymore. As for Eita, he demanded singles with Ogawa and Daga. On May 14, Eita faced Ogawa in a no-contest, after Stinger attacked Eita. Afterwards, Hayata made the save and stated that Ogawa's era was over. On May 21, following a match against Daga, he was again attacked by Stinger but was saved by Hayata. Afterwards, both would form a team. During this time, Eita began a feud with LEONA, who began targeting Eita, ever since his return to Noah. On November 24, after Daga successfully defended the GHC Junior Heavyweight Championship, Eita challenged him to a title match, before being attacked by Daga. On November 2 at Noah the Best, Daga made his way to the ring, in a crutch, giving an emotional speech that he could not defend the title against, and as such, he handed the title to Eita, before revealing to be a ruse when Daga attacked Eita with his crutch, stating that Eita never learned, and he was controlling him with mind games.

On January 2, 2024, Eita unsuccessfully challenged Daga for the GHC Junior Heavyweight Championship. On May 14, Pro Wrestling Noah held a press conference, officially announcing that Eita had signed with the promotion.

== Championships and accomplishments ==
- Desastre Total Ultraviolento
  - DTU Alto Rendimiento Championship (1 time)
- Dragon Gate
  - Open the Dream Gate Championship (1 time)
  - Open the Brave Gate Championship (2 times)
  - Open the Triangle Gate Championship (6 times) – with Flamita and T-Hawk (1), T-Hawk and U-T (1), Kaito Ishida and H.Y.O (2) and Nosawa Rongai and Kotaro Suzuki (2)
  - Open the Twin Gate Championship (5 times) – with T-Hawk (4), and Big R Shimizu (1)
  - King of Gate (2020)
  - Interim Open the Twin Gate Championship (1 time) – with T-Hawk
  - King of Chop (2012)
  - Open the Triangle Gate Championship Next Challenger Team One Night Tournament (2013) – with Flamita and T-Hawk
  - Summer Adventure Tag League (2013) – with T-Hawk
- Pro Wrestling Illustrated
  - Ranked No. 120 of the top 500 singles wrestlers in the PWI 500 in 2021
- Pro Wrestling Noah
  - GHC Junior Heavyweight Tag Team Championship (3 times) – with Nosawa Rongai (1), Yoshinari Ogawa (1) and Shuji Kondo (1)
  - GHC Junior Heavyweight Championship (3 times)
