= GHC Tag Team Championship =

Professional wrestling tag team championship

- Current championship design

Details
- Promotion: CyberFight
- Brand: Pro Wrestling Noah
- Date established: October 19, 2001
- Current champions: Jōnetsu Max (Manabu Soya and Yuki Iino)
- Date won: June 25, 2026
Statistics
- First champions: Vader and Scorpio
- Most reigns: Team (3 reigns): AXIZ (Go Shiozaki and Katsuhiko Nakajima); The Aggression (Katsuhiko Nakajima and Masa Kitamiya); Team Ikko/Brave (Naomichi Marufuji and Takashi Sugiura); Individual (12 reigns): Takashi Sugiura
- Longest reign: Bison Smith and Akitoshi Saito (486 days)
- Shortest reign: D'Lo Brown and Buchanan (7 days)
- Oldest champion: Keiji Muto (58 years, 325 days)
- Youngest champion: Kaito Kiyomiya (21 years, 286 days)
- Heaviest champion: Omos (400 lbs)

The Global Honored Crown (GHC) Tag Team Championship (Japanese: GHCタッグ王座, Hepburn: GHC Taggu Ōza) is a professional wrestling tag team title in Japanese promotion Pro Wrestling Noah. It was created on October 19, 2001, when Vader and Scorpio defeated Jun Akiyama and Akitoshi Saito in a tournament final. Though it is typically contested among heavyweights (>100 kg (220 lb; 16 st)), some junior heavyweights such as Naomichi Marufuji and Yoshinari Ogawa have held it in the past. It is currently one of two tag team titles in Noah, along with the GHC Junior Heavyweight Tag Team Championship (reserved for junior heavyweights).

== History ==
In October 2001, an 11-team tournament was held over the course of the "Navigation, Tug of War" tour. On October 19, Vader and Scorpio defeated Jun Akiyama and Akitoshi Saito in the final to become the inaugural champions.

=== Inaugural tournament ===
Round 1
October 6, Tokyo
Bull Schmitt and Bison Smith	13:58
Tamon Honda and Masao Inoue	Sub
October 6, Tokyo
Michael Modest and Donovan Morgan	Pin
Takeshi Morishima and Takeshi Rikio	11:27
October 8, Shizuoka
Takao Omori and Shinjiro Otani	Pin
Takuma Sano and Kentaro Shiga	16:41

Round 2
October 16, Tokyo
Vader and Scorpio	Pin
Takashi Sugiura and Daisuke Ikeda	6:53
October 16, Tokyo
Tamon Honda and Masao Inoue	Forfeit
Akira Taue and Jun Izumida	—
October 12, Chiba
Jun Akiyama and Akitoshi Saito	Pin
Michael Modest and Donovan Morgan	16:40
October 12, Chiba
Takao Omori and Shinjiro Otani	19:58
Mitsuharu Misawa and Yoshinari Ogawa	Pin

Semi-finals
October 17, Yamagata
Vader and Scorpio	Pin
Tamon Honda and Masao Inoue	5:27
October 17, Yamagata
Jun Akiyama and Akitoshi Saito	Pin
Mitsuharu Misawa and Yoshinari Ogawa	19:48

Final
October 19, Yokohama
Vader and Scorpio	Sub
Jun Akiyama and Akitoshi Saito	11:39

== Reigns ==
As of November 21, 2026, there have been a total of 77 reigns shared between 62 different teams, consisting of 69 different individual champions. The current champions are Passionate Ratel's |(Manabu Soya and Yuki Iino), who are in their first reign as a team. They won the titles by defeating defeated Los Tranquilos de Japon (Bushi and Tetsuya Naito) at Noah Legacy Rise on June 25, 2026, in Tokyo, Japan.

Key
No.	Overall reign number
Reign	Reign number for the specific team—reign numbers for the individuals are in parentheses, if different
Days	Number of days held
Defenses	Number of successful defenses
†	Championship change is unrecognized by the promotion
+	Current reign is changing daily

No.	Champion	Championship change			Reign statistics			Notes	Ref.
No.	Champion	Date	Event	Location	Reign	Days	Defenses	Notes	Ref.
1	Vader and Scorpio	October 19, 2001	Navigation, Tug of War Final Day	Yokohama, Japan	1	42	0	Defeated Jun Akiyama and Akitoshi Saito in a tournament final.	
2	Mitsuharu Misawa and Yoshinari Ogawa	November 30, 2001	Navigation in Raging Ocean	Sapporo, Japan	1	9	0		
3	No Fear (Takao Omori and Yoshihiro Takayama)	December 9, 2001	Navigation in Raging Ocean	Tokyo, Japan	1	70	0		
4	Wild II (Takeshi Morishima and Takeshi Rikio)	February 17, 2002	Navigate for Evolution Final Day	Tokyo, Japan	1	218	4		
5	Jun Akiyama and Akitoshi Saito	September 23, 2002	Great Voyage '02	Tokyo, Japan	1	256	5		
6	Burning (Tamon Honda and Kenta Kobashi)	June 6, 2003	Navigation with Breeze '03 Final Day	Tokyo, Japan	1	177	2		
7	Yuji Nagata and Hiroshi Tanahashi	November 30, 2003	Navigation, Uprising Spirit '03	Sapporo, Japan	1	41	1		
8	Mitsuharu Misawa and Yoshinari Ogawa	January 10, 2004	Great Voyage '04	Tokyo, Japan	2	379	7		
9	2 Cold Scorpio and Doug Williams	January 23, 2005	The First Navigation '05 Final Day	Kobe, Japan	1 (2, 1)	146	0	2 Cold Scorpio previously went by Scorpio.	
10	Naomichi Marufuji and Minoru Suzuki	June 18, 2005	FWA Live in Morecambe: NOAH Limits	Morecambe, England	1	132	2	This was a Frontier Wrestling Alliance event.	
11	Takeshi Morishima and Muhammad Yone	October 28, 2005	Autumn Navigation 2006 - Day 14	Osaka, Japan	1 (2, 1)	219	2		
12	Burning (Tamon Honda and Kenta Kobashi)	June 4, 2006	Northern Navigation 2006 - Day 12	Sapporo, Japan	2	113	0		
—	Vacated	September 25, 2006	—	—	—	—	—	Vacated due to Kobashi becoming inactive with kidney cancer.	
13	Takeshi Morishima and Muhammad Yone	December 2, 2006	Winter Navigation 2006	Yokohama, Japan	2 (3, 2)	120	0	Defeated Takuma Sano and Yoshihiro Takayama in a tournament final for the vacant titles.	
14	Jun Akiyama and Takeshi Rikio	April 1, 2007	Spring Navigation 2007 - Day 1	Tokyo, Japan	1 (2, 2)	165	3		
—	Vacated	September 13, 2007	—	—	—	—	—	Vacated due to Rikio suffering a neck injury.	
15	RO&D (D'Lo Brown and Buchanan)	October 20, 2007	Autumn Navigation 2007 - Day 8	Kurume, Japan	1	7	0	Defeated Akira Taue and Go Shiozaki in a tournament final for the vacant titles.	
16	Team Ikko (Naomichi Marufuji and Takashi Sugiura)	October 27, 2007	Autumn Navigation 2007 - Day 12	Tokyo, Japan	1 (2, 1)	209	2		
17	Akitoshi Saito and Bison Smith	May 23, 2008	NOAH Northern Navigation 2008 - Day 5	Nagoya, Japan	1 (2, 1)	486	3		
18	Kensuke Sasaki and Takeshi Morishima	September 21, 2009	Exceeding Our Dreams 2009 - Day 5	Niigata, Japan	1 (1, 4)	76	1		
19	Disobey (Takeshi Rikio and Muhammad Yone)	December 6, 2009	Winter Navigation 2009 - Day 10	Tokyo, Japan	1 (3, 3)	129	2		
20	Bison Smith and Keith Walker	April 14, 2010	Spring Navigation 2010 - Day 4	Osaka, Japan	1 (2, 1)	149	1		
—	Vacated	September 10, 2010	—	—	—	—	—	Vacated due to Walker not returning to Japan after the death of his father.	
21	Takuma Sano and Yoshihiro Takayama	September 18, 2010	Shiny Navigation 2010 - Day 5	Osaka, Japan	1 (1, 2)	273	4	Defeated Akitoshi Saito and Bison Smith for the vacant titles.	
22	Bad Intentions (Giant Bernard and Karl Anderson)	June 18, 2011	New Japan Pro-Wrestling's Dominion 6.18	Osaka, Japan	1	218	2		
23	Special Assault Team (Jun Akiyama and Akitoshi Saito)	January 22, 2012	Great Voyage In Osaka 2012	Osaka, Japan	2 (3, 3)	182	3		
24	Magnus and Samoa Joe	July 22, 2012	Great Voyage 2012 In Ryogoku	Ryōgoku, Japan	1	78	0		
25	No Mercy (Kenta and Maybach Taniguchi)	October 8, 2012	Autumn Navigation 2012	Yokohama, Japan	1	18	0		
26	Special Assault Team (Akitoshi Saito and Go Shiozaki)	October 26, 2012	Autumn Navigation 2012 - Day 5	Niigata, Japan	1 (4, 1)	44	0		
27	Brave (Naomichi Marufuji and Takashi Sugiura)	December 9, 2012	The Great Voyage In Ryogoku 2012 Vol. 2	Ryōgoku, Japan	2 (3, 2)	91	1		
28	Chaos (Takashi Iizuka and Toru Yano)	March 10, 2013	Great Voyage 2013 In Yokohama	Yokohama, Japan	1	119	2		
29	TMDK (Mikey Nicholls and Shane Haste)	July 7, 2013	Great Voyage 2013 In Tokyo	Tokyo, Japan	1	202	3		
30	Choukibou-gun (Maybach Taniguchi and Takeshi Morishima)	January 25, 2014	The First Navigation 2014 - Day 11	Osaka, Japan	1 (2, 5)	126	1		
31	Dangan Yankies (Masato Tanaka and Takashi Sugiura)	May 31, 2014	Navigation with Breeze 2014 - Day 4	Osaka, Japan	1 (1, 3)	224	4		
32	TMDK (Mikey Nicholls and Shane Haste)	January 10, 2015	New Year Navigation 2015	Tokyo, Japan	2	32	0		
33	K.E.S. (Davey Boy Smith Jr. and Lance Archer)	February 11, 2015	Great Voyage 2015 in Nagoya	Nagoya, Japan	1	472	10		
34	Naomichi Marufuji and Toru Yano	May 28, 2016	Great Voyage 2016 in Osaka	Osaka, Japan	1 (4, 2)	179	6		
35	K.E.S. (Davey Boy Smith Jr. and Lance Archer)	November 23, 2016	Global League-sen 2016	Tokyo, Japan	2	10	0		
36	Go Shiozaki and Maybach Taniguchi	December 3, 2016	One Night Cruise 2016 in Differ	Tokyo, Japan	1 (2, 3)	49	1		
37	Kenoh and Masa Kitamiya	January 21, 2017	The First Navig. 2017	Osaka, Japan	1	34	0		
—	Vacated	February 24, 2017	The Second Navig. 2017	Tokyo, Japan	—	—	—	Vacated after Kenoh turned on Kitamiya.	
38	Kenoh and Takashi Sugiura	March 12, 2017	Great Voyage 2017 in Yokohama	Yokohama, Japan	1 (2, 4)	33	0	Defeated Masa Kitamiya and Muhammad Yone for the vacant titles.	
39	Maybach Taniguchi and Naomichi Marufuji	April 14, 2017	GTL e no Countdown	Tokyo, Japan	1 (4, 5)	134	2		
40	Atsushi Kotoge and Go Shiozaki	August 26, 2017	Summer Navigation 2017 Vol. 2	Tokyo, Japan	1 (1, 3)	36	0		
41	50 Funky Powers (Muhammad Yone and Quiet Storm)	October 1, 2017	Great Voyage 2017 in Yokohama Vol. 2	Yokohama, Japan	1 (4, 1)	161	2		
42	The Aggression (Katsuhiko Nakajima and Masa Kitamiya)	March 11, 2018	Great Voyage 2018 in Yokohama	Yokohama, Japan	1 (1, 2)	49	0		
43	GO-KAI (Go Shiozaki and Kaito Kiyomiya)	April 29, 2018	Great Voyage 2018 in Niigata	Yokohama, Japan	1 (4, 1)	30	0		
44	The Aggression (Katsuhiko Nakajima and Masa Kitamiya)	May 29, 2018	Navigation with Breeze 2018	Yokohama, Japan	2 (2, 3)	60	0		
45	Naomichi Marufuji and Akitoshi Saito	July 28, 2018	12th Global Jr. Heavyweight Tag League	Tokyo, Japan	1 (6, 5)	123	2		
—	Vacated	November 28, 2018	—	—	—	—	—	Vacated due to Marufuji suffering a shoulder injury.	
46	Go Shiozaki and Katsuhiko Nakajima	December 7, 2018	Winter Navigation	Tokyo, Japan	1 (5, 3)	9	0	Defeated Kenoh and Masa Kitamiya in a tournament final for the vacant titles.	
47	Hooligans (Maybach Taniguchi and Yuji Hino)	December 16, 2018	Great Voyage in Yokohama Vol. 2	Yokohama, Japan	1 (5, 1)	47	1		
48	50 Funky Powers (Muhammad Yone and Quiet Storm)	February 1, 2019	Navigation for the Future 2019	Tokyo, Japan	2 (5, 2)	23	0		
49	AXIZ (Go Shiozaki and Katsuhiko Nakajima)	February 24, 2019	Navigation for the Progress 2019	Tokyo, Japan	2 (6, 4)	109	1		
50	Sugiura-gun (Kazma Sakamoto and Takashi Sugiura)	June 13, 2019	Global Junior Tag League 2019	Osaka, Japan	1 (1, 5)	14	0		
51	AXIZ (Go Shiozaki and Katsuhiko Nakajima)	June 27, 2019	Global Junior League 2019	Tokyo, Japan	3 (7, 5)	192	3		
52	Naomichi Marufuji and Masaaki Mochizuki	January 5, 2020	Reboot	Tokyo, Japan	1 (7, 1)	105	1		
53	Sugiura-gun International (El Hijo de Dr. Wagner Jr. and René Duprée)	April 19, 2020	Noah the Spirit	Tokyo, Japan	1	98	0		
—	Vacated	July 26, 2020	—	—	—	—	—	Vacated when Wagner and Duprée cannot enter Japan due to international travel restrictions as a result of the COVID-19 pandemic.	
54	Sugiura-gun (Takashi Sugiura and Kazushi Sakuraba)	August 30, 2020	KAWASAKI, GO! 2020	Kawasaki, Japan	1 (6, 1)	189	3	Defeated AXIZ (Go Shiozaki and Katsuhiko Nakajima) to win the vacant titles.	
55	The Aggression (Katsuhiko Nakajima and Masa Kitamiya)	March 7, 2021	Great Voyage 2021 In Yokohama	Yokohama, Japan	3 (6, 4)	137	1	Kitamiya and Nakajima won the titles on this occasion as part of the Kongo stable. Kitamiya turned on Nakajima following their lone title defense from Mitsuharu Misawa Memorial from May 31, 2021. Despite that, they remained champions until a decision match was held.	
56	Kaito Kiyomiya and Masa Kitamiya	July 22, 2021	NOAH Up To Emotion 2021 Day 4	Tokyo, Japan	1 (2, 5)	114	0	Nakajima teamed with Manabu Soya to defend against Kitamiya and Kiyomiya to determine new champions.	
57	M's Alliance (Keiji Muto and Naomichi Marufuji)	November 13, 2021	NOAH Demolition Stage 2021 In Yokohama	Yokohama, Japan	1 (1, 8)	87	2		
—	Vacated	February 8, 2022	—	—	—	—	—	Vacated due to Muto suffering a hip injury.	
58	Sugiura-gun (Takashi Sugiura and Hideki Suzuki)	March 13, 2022	NOAH Great Voyage 2022 In Yokohama	Yokohama, Japan	1 (7, 1)	52	1	Defeated Kaito Kiyomiya and Daiki Inaba in a tournament final for the vacant titles.	
59	Sugiura-gun International (El Hijo de Dr. Wagner Jr. and René Duprée)	May 4, 2022	NOAH Dream On 2022	Tokyo, Japan	2	17	0		
60	Michael Elgin and Masa Kitamiya	May 21, 2022	Dream On Final 2022	Tokyo, Japan	1 (1, 6)	56	0		
—	Vacated	July 16, 2022	Destination 2022	Tokyo, Japan	—	—	—	Vacated due to Elgin not being able to make it to the title defense.	
61	Sugiura-gun (Hideki Suzuki and Timothy Thatcher)	July 16, 2022	Destination 2022	Tokyo, Japan	1 (2, 1)	71	0	Defeated Masa Kitamiya and Yoshiki Inamura for the vacant titles.	
62	TakaKoji (Takashi Sugiura and Satoshi Kojima)	September 25, 2022	Grand Ship in Nagoya 2022	Nagoya, Japan	1 (8, 1)	140	3		
63	Masa Kitamiya and Daiki Inaba	February 12, 2023	Great Voyage in Osaka 2023	Osaka, Japan	1 (7, 1)	63	1		
64	Takashi Sugiura and Shuhei Taniguchi	April 16, 2023	Green Journey in Sendai 2023	Sendai, Japan	1 (9, 6)	18	0	Taniguchi was previously known as Maybach Taniguchi.	
65	Real (Timothy Thatcher and Saxon Huxley)	May 4, 2023	Majestic 2023	Tokyo, Japan	1 (2, 1)	143	1		
66	Good Looking Guys (Jack Morris and Anthony Greene)	September 24, 2023	Grand Ship In Nagoya 2023	Tokyo, Japan	1	266	8		
67	Naomichi Marufuji and Takashi Sugiura	June 16, 2024	Grand Ship In Yokohama	Yokohama, Japan	3 (9, 10)	199	4	Marufuji and Sugiura previously won the titles under the tag names of Team Ikko and Brave. However in this reign, they did not use any of those team names.	
68	Team 2000X (Jack Morris and Omos)	January 1, 2025	The New Year 2025	Tokyo, Japan	1 (2, 1)	24	1		
†	Team 2000X (Jack Morris and Daga)	January 25, 2025	Sunny Voyage 2025	Osaka, Japan	—	2	0	Lineal champion Omos transferred his half of the championship to Daga due to going back to WWE. This title change was not recognized by Noah and was officially sanctioned as a vacancy two days later.	
—	Vacated	January 27, 2025	—	—	—	—	—	Vacated due to Noah not recognizing the transfer of the championship.	
69	Team 2000X (Jack Morris and Daga)	April 6, 2025	Sunny Voyage 2025	Osaka, Japan	1 (3, 1)	27	0	Defeated All Rebellion (Galeno and Kaito Kiyomiya) to win the vacant titles.	
70	Kenoh and Ulka Sasaki	May 3, 2025	Memorial Voyage in Kokugikan	Tokyo, Japan	1 (3, 1)	31	1		
71	Ratel's (Manabu Soya and Daiki Inaba)	June 3, 2025	Star Navigation 2025 (Night 2)	Tokyo, Japan	1 (1, 2)	69	1		
72	Team 2000X (Masa Kitamiya and Takashi Sugiura)	August 11, 2025	Noah Kawasaki Summer Voyage 2025	Kawasaki, Japan	1 (8, 11)	89	0		
73	Hank and Tank (Hank Walker and Tank Ledger)	November 8, 2025	Star Navigation 2025 (Night 3)	Tokyo, Japan	1	13	0		
74	Team 2000X (Masa Kitamiya and Takashi Sugiura)	November 21, 2025	Cross Over in Sendai 2025	Sendai, Japan	2 (9, 12)	22	0		
75	Maruken (Kenoh and Naomichi Marufuji)	December 13, 2025	Sunny Voyage 2025	Nagoya, Japan	1 (4, 10)	19	0		
76	Los Tranquilos de Japon (Tetsuya Naito and Bushi)	January 1, 2026	The New Year 2026	Tokyo, Japan	1	175	3		
77	Jōnetsu Max (Manabu Soya and Yuki Iino)	June 25, 2026	Legacy Rise 2026	Tokyo, Japan	1 (2, 1)	149+	3		

== Combined reigns ==
As of November 21, 2026.

†	Indicates the current champions

=== By team ===
Rank	Team	No. of reigns	Combined defenses	Combined days
1	Team Ikko/Brave (Naomichi Marufuji and Takashi Sugiura)	3	7	499
2	Akitoshi Saito and Bison Smith	1	3	486
3	K.E.S. (Davey Boy Smith Jr. and Lance Archer)	2	10	482
4	Jun Akiyama and Akitoshi Saito	2	8	438
5	Mitsuharu Misawa and Yoshinari Ogawa	2	7	388
6	Takeshi Morishima and Muhammad Yone	2	2	339
7	AXIZ (Go Shiozaki and Katsuhiko Nakajima)	3	4	310
8	Burning (Tamon Honda and Kenta Kobashi)	2	2	290
9	Takuma Sano and Yoshihiro Takayama	1	4	273
10	Good Looking Guys (Jack Morris and Anthony Greene)	1	8	266
11	The Aggression (Note: Nakajima and Kitamiya won the titles as part of Kongo only on the third occasion.) (Katsuhiko Nakajima and Masa Kitamiya)	3	1	246
12	TMDK (Mikey Nicholls and Shane Haste)	2	3	234
13	Dangan Yankies (Masato Tanaka and Takashi Sugiura)	1	4	224
14	Wild II (Takeshi Morishima and Takeshi Rikio)	1	4	218
14	Bad Intentions (Giant Bernard and Karl Anderson)	1	2	218
16	Sugiura-gun (Takashi Sugiura and Kazushi Sakuraba)	1	3	189
17	50 Funky Powers (Muhammad Yone and Quiet Storm)	2	2	184
18	Naomichi Marufuji and Toru Yano	1	6	179
19	Los Tranquilos de Japon (Tetsuya Naito and Bushi)	1	3	175
20	Jun Akiyama and Takeshi Rikio	1	3	165
21	Passionate Ratel's † (Manabu Soya and Yuki Iino)	1	3	149+
22	Bison Smith and Keith Walker	1	1	149
23	2 Cold Scorpio and Doug Williams	1	0	146
24	Real (Timothy Thatcher and Saxon Huxley)	1	1	143
25	TakaKoji (Takashi Sugiura and Satoshi Kojima)	1	3	140
26	Maybach Taniguchi and Naomichi Marufuji	1	2	134
27	Naomichi Marufuji and Minoru Suzuki	1	2	132
28	Disobey (Takeshi Rikio and Muhammad Yone)	1	2	129
29	Choukibou-gun (Maybach Taniguchi and Takeshi Morishima)	1	1	126
30	Naomichi Marufuji and Akitoshi Saito	1	2	123
31	Chaos (Takashi Iizuka and Toru Yano)	1	2	119
32	Sugiura-gun International (El Hijo de Dr. Wagner Jr. and René Duprée)	2	0	115
33	Kaito Kiyomiya and Masa Kitamiya	1	0	114
34	Team 2000X (Masa Kitamiya and Takashi Sugiura)	2	0	111
35	Naomichi Marufuji and Masaaki Mochizuki	1	1	105
36	M's Alliance (Keiji Muto and Naomichi Marufuji)	1	2	87
37	Magnus and Samoa Joe	1	0	78
38	Kensuke Sasaki and Takeshi Morishima	1	1	76
39	Sugiura-gun (Hideki Suzuki and Timothy Thatcher)	1	0	71
40	No Fear (Takao Omori and Yoshihiro Takayama)	1	0	70
41	Ratel's (Manabu Soya and Daiki Inaba)	1	1	69
42	Masa Kitamiya and Daiki Inaba	1	1	63
43	Michael Elgin and Masa Kitamiya	1	0	56
44	Sugiura-gun (Takashi Sugiura and Hideki Suzuki)	1	1	52
45	Go Shiozaki and Maybach Taniguchi	1	1	49
46	Hooligans (Maybach Taniguchi and Yuji Hino)	1	1	47
47	Special Assault Team (Akitoshi Saito and Go Shiozaki)	1	0	44
48	Vader and Scorpio	1	0	42
49	Yuji Nagata and Hiroshi Tanahashi	1	1	41
50	Atsushi Kotoge and Go Shiozaki	1	0	36
51	Kenoh and Masa Kitamiya	1	0	34
52	Kenoh and Takashi Sugiura	1	0	33
53	Kenoh and Ulka Sasaki	1	1	31
54	Go Shiozaki and Kaito Kiyomiya	1	0	30
55	Team 2000X (Jack Morris and Daga)	1	0	27
56	Team 2000X (Jack Morris and Omos)	1	1	24
57	Maruken (Kenoh and Naomichi Marufuji)	1	0	19
58	No Mercy (Kenta and Maybach Taniguchi)	1	0	18
58	Takashi Sugiura and Shuhei Taniguchi	1	0	18
60	Sugiura-gun (Takashi Sugiura and Kazma Sakamoto)	1	0	14
61	Hank and Tank (Hank Walker and Tank Ledger)	1	0	13
62	RO&D (D'Lo Brown and Buchanan)	1	0	7

=== By wrestler ===
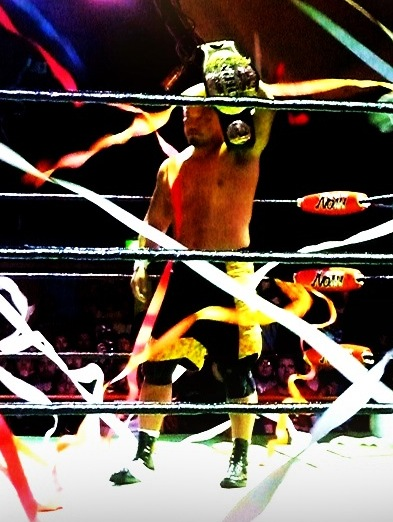
Record twelve-time champion as individual, Takashi Sugiura.

Rank	Wrestler	No. of reigns	Combined defenses	Combined days
1	Takashi Sugiura	12	18	1,279
2	Naomichi Marufuji	10	22	1,277
3	Akitoshi Saito	5	12	1,091
4	Takeshi Morishima	5	8	759
5	Muhammad Yone	5	6	652
6	Bison Smith	2	4	635
7	Masa Kitamiya	9	2	624
8	Jun Akiyama	3	11	603
9	Katsuhiko Nakajima	6	5	556
10	Takeshi Rikio	3	9	512
11	Lance Archer	2	10	482
11	Davey Boy Smith Jr.	2	10	482
13	Go Shiozaki	7	5	469
14	Shuhei/Maybach Taniguchi	6	5	392
15	Mitsuharu Misawa	2	7	388
15	Yoshinari Ogawa	2	7	388
17	Yoshihiro Takayama	2	4	343
18	Jack Morris	3	9	319
19	Toru Yano	2	8	298
20	Tamon Honda	2	2	290
20	Kenta Kobashi	2	2	290
22	Takuma Sano	1	4	273
23	Anthony Greene	1	8	266
24	Shane Haste	2	3	234
24	Mikey Nicholls	2	3	234
26	Masato Tanaka	1	4	224
27	Manabu Soya †	2	4	218+
28	Karl Anderson	1	2	218
28	Giant Bernard	1	2	218
30	Timothy Thatcher	2	1	214
31	Kazushi Sakuraba	1	3	189
32	Scorpio	2	0	188
33	Quiet Storm	2	2	184
34	Tetsuya Naito	1	3	175
34	Bushi	1	3	175
36	Yuki Iino †	1	3	149+
37	Keith Walker	1	1	149
38	Doug Williams	1	0	146
39	Kaito Kiyomiya	2	0	144
40	Saxon Huxley	1	1	143
41	Satoshi Kojima	1	3	140
42	Minoru Suzuki	1	2	132
42	Daiki Inaba	2	2	132
44	Hideki Suzuki	2	1	123
45	Takayuki Iizuka	1	2	119
46	Kenoh	4	1	117
47	El Hijo del Dr. Wagner Jr.	2	0	115
47	René Duprée	2	0	115
49	Masaaki Mochizuki	1	1	105
50	Keiji Muto	1	2	87
51	Magnus	1	0	78
51	Samoa Joe	1	0	78
53	Kensuke Sasaki	1	2	76
54	Takao Omori	1	0	70
55	Michael Elgin	1	0	56
56	Yuji Hino	1	1	47
57	Vader	1	0	42
58	Yuji Nagata	1	1	41
58	Hiroshi Tanahashi	1	1	41
60	Atsushi Kotoge	1	0	36
61	Ulka Sasaki	1	1	31
62	Daga	1	0	27
63	Omos	1	1	24
64	Kenta	1	0	18
65	Kazma Sakamoto	1	0	14
66	Hank Walker	1	0	13
66	Tank Ledger	1	0	13
68	D'Lo Brown	1	0	7
68	Buchanan	1	0	7
