= Timothy Thatcher =

American professional wrestler (born 1983)

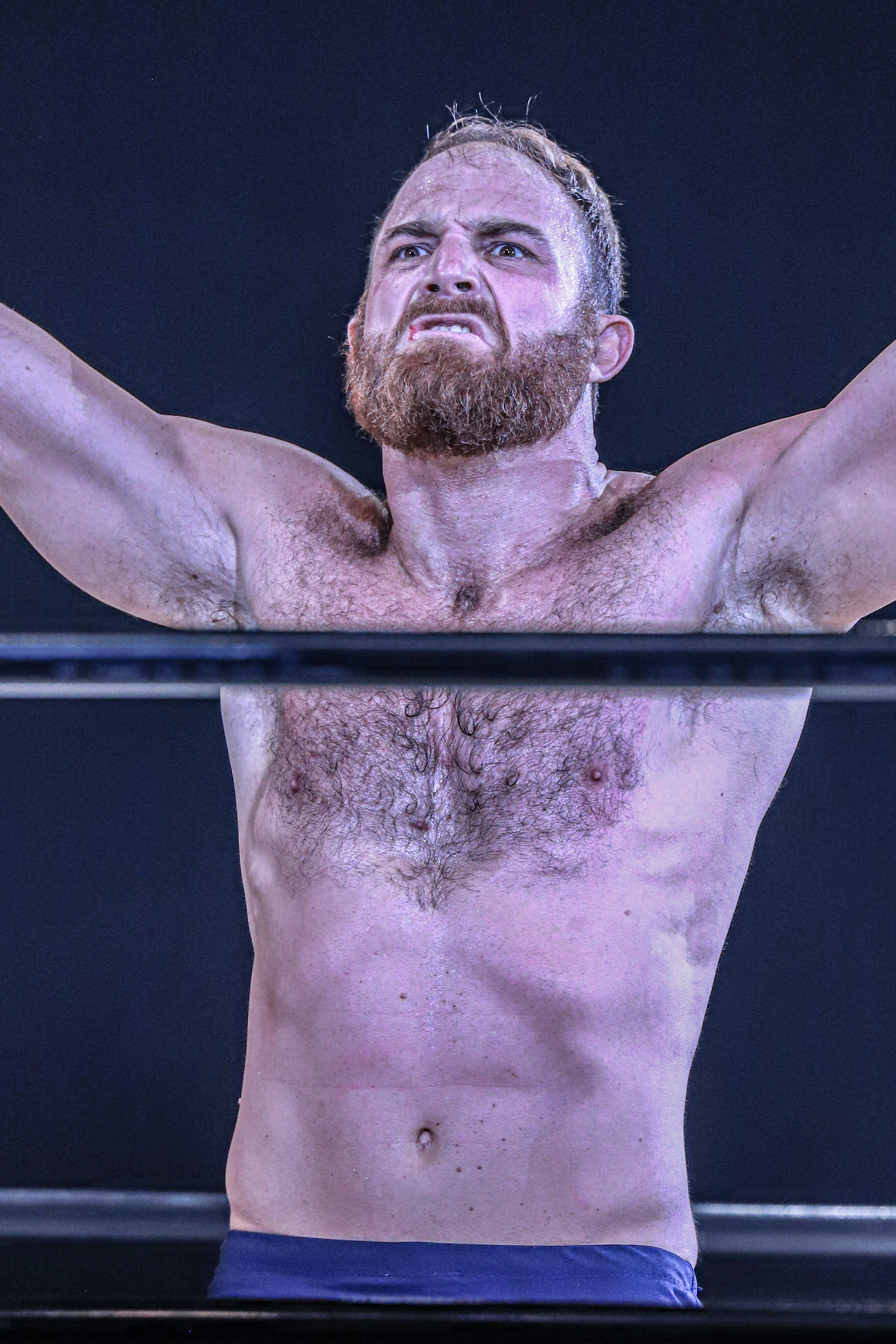
- Thatcher in 2023

Personal information
- Born: Timothy Andrew Moura; March 17, 1983 (age 43) Alameda County, California, U.S.

Professional wrestling career
- Ring name(s): Tim Moura; Timothy Thatcher; Bryce Braxton-Collins
- Billed height: 6 ft 3 in (191 cm)
- Billed weight: 225 lb (102 kg)
- Billed from: Sacramento, California
- Trained by: SPW Training Academy; APW Bootcamp
- Debut: 2005

Timothy Andrew Moura (born March 17, 1983), better known by the ring name Timothy Thatcher, is an American professional wrestler. He is signed to WWE as a trainer for the WWE ID program and is the on-screen general manager of the Evolve brand. He also performs on the independent circuit.

Moura is known for his work in the original Evolve promotion, where he is the longest-reigning Evolve Champion, as well as a former (and final) Open the Freedom Gate Champion and the 2014 Style Battle Tournament winner. In addition to his work for WWNLive promotions, Thatcher has worked internationally for numerous notable promotions, including Pro Wrestling Guerrilla (PWG), Progress Wrestling, Revolution Pro Wrestling (RevPro), Pro Wrestling Noah, Major League Wrestling (MLW), Preston City Wrestling (PCW), Westside Xtreme Wrestling (wXw) and, Combat Zone Wrestling (CZW).

Moura is the second and final man (after Drew Galloway) to simultaneously hold the Evolve and Open The Freedom Gate Championships.

== Professional wrestling career ==
=== Early career (2005–2013) ===
Moura began watching professional wrestling as a child with his grandmother. He later studied journalism and wrote an article about Supreme Pro Wrestling for a publication that folded before it could be published. He continued to attend SPW shows with the intention of being involved, becoming a referee and training to wrestle.

Moura made his professional wrestling debut in September 2005 for SPW in a match lost against Drake Smith. Between the names Tim Moura and Timothy Thatcher, he appeared in promotions including Supreme Pro Wrestling, All Pro Wrestling (APW), Pro Wrestling Bushido, Championship Wrestling from Hollywood (CWFH) and Pro Wrestling Guerrilla (PWG) among others. Thatcher would later work for Insane Championship Wrestling (ICW) and Source Wrestling, Preston City Wrestling (PCW), Progress Wrestling (Progress), Southside Wrestling Entertainment (SWE), and Westside Xtreme Wrestling (wXw), where he is a former Unified World Wrestling Champion and World Tag Team Champion with Walter. Thatcher became a Triple Crown Champion in Supreme Pro Wrestling, winning the SPW Extreme Championship, Heavyweight Championship and Tag Team Championship. While in All Pro Wrestling, Thatcher became a two-time APW Universal Heavyweight Champion and a two-time APW Worldwide Internet Champion.

=== Westside Xtreme Wrestling (2013–2019) ===
Thatcher debuted in Westside Xtreme Wrestling (wXw) in 2013 during its Ambition 4 tournament, in a quarter final match lost against Heddi Karaoui. The following night, he also competed in wXw's Back To The Roots XII event, losing in a singles match against Axel Dieter Jr. During his tenure in wXw, Thatcher became a one-time wXw World Tag Team Champion with Walter, and a one-time wXw Unified World Wrestling Champion.

=== Evolve (2014–2019) ===
Thatcher made his Evolve debut at Evolve 31 in a Round Robin Challenge, losing to Drew Gulak. At Evolve 45, Thatcher became a double-champion, winning both the Open the Freedom Gate Championship and the Evolve Championship. Thatcher was the longest reigning Evolve Champion in history until he lost to Zack Sabre Jr. on February 25, 2017, at Evolve 79, ending his reign at 596 days.

=== WWE (2020–2022) ===
On February 2, 2020, it was reported Thatcher signed a developmental contract with WWE. On the April 15 edition of NXT, Thatcher was revealed as Matt Riddle's tag team partner, replacing Pete Dunne (who was unable to travel due to the COVID-19 pandemic). Thatcher and Riddle defended the NXT Tag Team Championship against Undisputed Era. However, on the May 13 edition of NXT, Thatcher and Riddle lost the titles to Imperium when Thatcher walked out on Riddle during the match, turning heel in the process. Thatcher would then face Riddle later on in the evening, with Riddle picking up the win. Following the match, Thatcher would attack Riddle and lock him in his Fujiwara armbar submission. Their storyline would end the following week in a Fight Pit match with Kurt Angle as the special guest referee, where Thatcher won after Riddle passed out to a rear naked choke.

On the June 17, 2020 episode of NXT, Thatcher debuted a new gimmick of a submission specialist who taught students his "Thatch-as-Thatch-Can" style of training. On the September 16 episode of NXT, Thatcher had his first singles championship match in WWE when he faced Damian Priest for the NXT North American Championship where he was unsuccessful. At NXT TakeOver XXX, he had his first Takeover match where he lost to Finn Bálor.

In late 2020, Thatcher began a feud with Tommaso Ciampa which led to a match at NXT TakeOver War Games where Ciampa won. On the January 20, 2021, episode of NXT, Thatcher fought Ciampa in the Fight Pit where he came out victorious. After the match, Thatcher and Ciampa showed respect to one another and Ciampa asked Thatcher to be his partner for the Dusty Rhodes Tag Team Classic which Thatcher accepted, turning face in the process. They defeated Ariya Daivari and Tony Nese in the first round, The Undisputed Era (Adam Cole and Roderick Strong), in the quarter-finals, before being defeated by the Grizzled Young Veterans (James Drake and Zack Gibson) in the semi-finals. On the June 15 episode of NXT, Ciampa and Thatcher defeated the Grizzled Young Veterans in a tornado tag match to earn a future NXT Tag Team Championship match. They faced the champions, MSK (Wes Lee and Nash Carter) on July 6 at The Great American Bash but were defeated.

On the August 24, 2021 episode of NXT, Thatcher faced Ridge Holland in a losing effort and after the match would be brutally attacked by Holland, writing him off television. This would mark his final appearance on television as he would transition to a coaching role at the WWE Performance Center. On January 5, 2022, Thatcher was released from his WWE contract.

=== Pro Wrestling Noah (2022–2024) ===
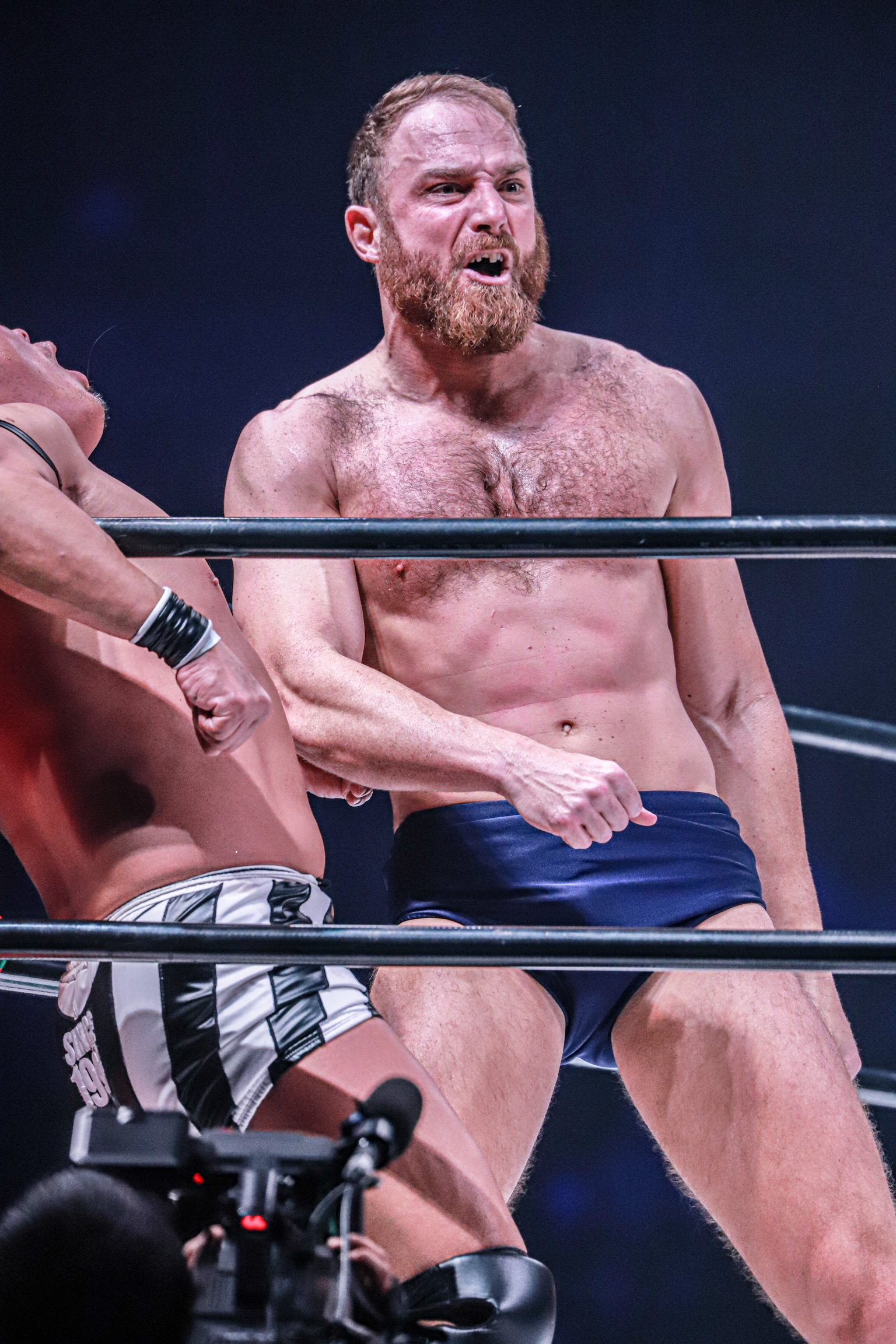
Moura on January 22, 2023 at The Great Muta Final "Bye-Bye"

On June 7, 2022, Thatcher made his debut in Pro Wrestling Noah (Noah) teaming with Sugiura-gun members El Hijo del Dr. Wagner Jr., Hideki Suzuki, Rene Dupree and Takashi Sugiura, subsequently becoming the newest member of the stable. The next day, he defeated Shuhei Taniguchi in his first singles match for Noah. On July 16, Thatcher won the vacant GHC Tag Team Championship with Suzuki, defeating Masa Kitamiya and Yoshiki Inamura. They would lose their titles to Takashi Sugiura and Satoshi Kojima on September 25, ending their reign at 71 days. On October 11, He would face Kaito Kiyomiya for the GHC Heavyweight Championship, in a losing effort.

On April 16, 2023, at Green Journey in Sendai, Thatcher and Saxon Huxley began teaming with each other, and the two developed a good chemistry with one another. Later that night, Hideki Suzuki on the behalf of Thatcher and Huxley challenged Shuhei Taniguchi and Takashi Sugiura to a title match for the GHC Tag Team Championship. After the relationship between Sugiura-gun members had just fizzled out over the previous months, Suzuki stated that Sugiura-gun wasn't working and was over, leading Sugiura to confirm that the stable had disbanded. On April 22, their stable was named "Real". On May 4 at Majestic, Thatcher and Huxley defeated Sugiura and Taniguchi to win the GHC Tag Team Championship. In August, Thatcher took part in the 2023 N-1 Victory, finishing the tournament with a record of four wins and three losses, failing to advance to the finals of the tournament. On September 24 at Grand Ship In Nagoya, Thatcher and Huxley lost the GHC Tag Team Championship to Good Looking Guys (Jack Morris and Anthony Greene).

From February 24 to March 10, Thatcher and Huxley took part in the 2024 Victory Challenge Tag League, where they finished the tournament with a record of five wins and two losses, advancing to the tournament's finals. On March 10, they were defeated in the finals of the tournament by Kaito Kiyomiya and Ryohei Oiwa. However on March 17, it was announced that Kiyomiya, was forced to withdraw from the title match for the GHC Tag Team Championship due to a spinal cord concussion sustained during training, leading Huxley and Thatcher, who finished as the Victory Challenge Tag League runners-up to replace them. At the title match, at Great Voyage in Yokohama, Thatcher and Huxley unsuccessfully challenged Jack Morris and Anthony Greene for the GHC Tag Team Championship. This marked Thatcher and Huxley's last appearance for the promotion.

=== All Elite Wrestling / Ring of Honor (2023) ===
Thatcher made his All Elite Wrestling (AEW) debut on February 1, 2023, facing off against Bryan Danielson on AEW Dynamite after being (kayfabe) contracted by MJF, where he was unsuccessful.

Thatcher debuted in AEW's sister promotion, Ring of Honor (ROH), on the February 18, 2023 edition of ROH on HonorClub, where he confronted the ROH Pure Champion Wheeler Yuta. The following week, they wrestled for the Pure Championship, with Thatcher losing.

=== Major League Wrestling (2023–2025) ===
On June 8, 2023, it was announced by Major League Wrestling that Timothy Thatcher would be making his MLW debut against Tracy Williams on July 8 at Never Say Never. Thatcher would lose at the event via referee stoppage.

=== Return to WWE (2024–present) ===
On November 9, 2024, Fightful reported that Thatcher had been re-signed by WWE to serve as the WWE ID trainer. On the March 26, 2025 episode of Evolve, Thatcher made his WWE in-ring return, losing to Sean Legacy. On the March 11, 2026 episode of Evolve, Interim NXT General Manager Robert Stone announced Thatcher as the new Evolve General Manager, to which Thatcher dubbed himself as the Evolve Foreman.

== Other media ==
Thatcher made his video game debut as a playable character in WWE 2K22.

== Championships and accomplishments ==
- All Pro Wrestling
  - APW Universal Heavyweight Championship (2 times)
  - APW Worldwide Internet Championship (2 times)
- Championship Wrestling from Hollywood
  - CWFH Heritage Tag Team Championship (1 time) – with Drew Gulak
  - UWN Tag Team Championship (1 time, inaugural) – with Drew Gulak
- DDT Pro-Wrestling
  - Ironman Heavymetalweight Championship (1 time)
- Evolve
  - Evolve Championship (1 time)
  - Open the Freedom Gate Championship (1 time, final)
  - Style Battle Tournament (2014)
- Pacific Northwest Wrestling
  - Pacific Northwest Light Heavyweight Championship (1 time)
- Pro Wrestling Bushido
  - PWB Heavyweight Championship (1 time)
- Pro Wrestling Illustrated
  - Ranked No. 71 of the best 500 singles wrestlers in the PWI 500 in 2016
- Pro Wrestling Noah
  - GHC Tag Team Championship (2 times) – with Hideki Suzuki (1) and Saxon Huxley (1)
- Supreme Pro Wrestling
  - SPW Heavyweight Championship (1 time)
  - SPW Extreme Championship (1 time)
  - SPW Tag Team Championship (1 time) – with Drake Frost
- Westside Xtreme Wrestling
  - wXw Unified World Wrestling Championship (1 time)
  - wXw World Tag Team Championship (1 time) – with Walter
  - Ambition 9 (2018)
  - Road to 16 Carat Gold Tournament (2016)
  - World Tag League (2017) – with Walter
  - Shortcut to the Top (2019)
- Rising Sun Wrestling
  - God of Sun Championship (1 time)
