= El Hijo de Dr. Wagner Jr. =

Mexican professional wrestler

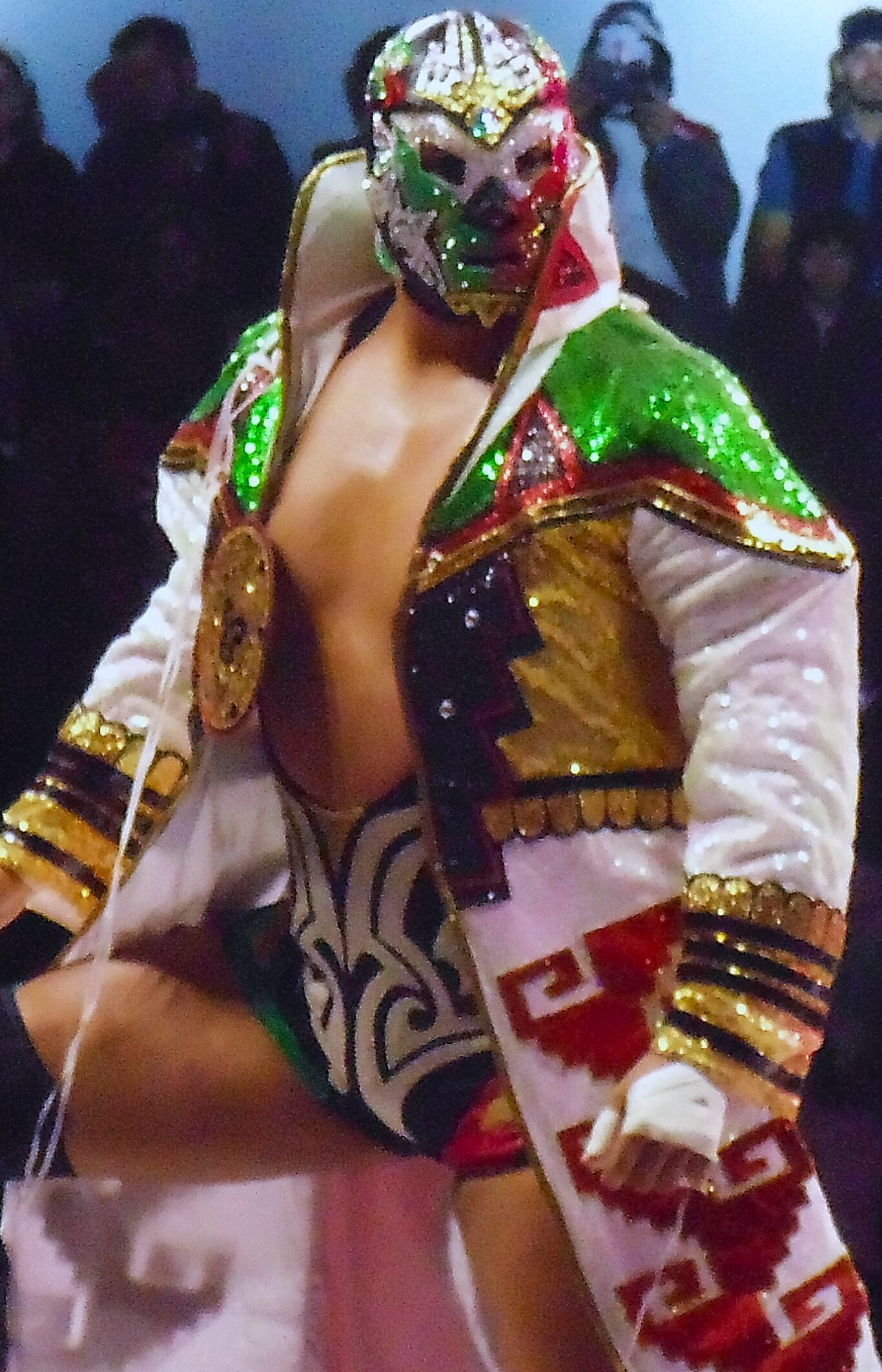
- Wagner Jr. in 2026

Personal information
- Born: Unrevealed; December 4, 1991 (age 34) Mexico
- Parents: Dr. Wagner Jr. (father); Rossy Moreno (mother)
- Family: Dr. Wagner (grandfather); Galeno del Mal (brother); Silver King (uncle); El Oriental (uncle); Esther Moreno (aunt)

Professional wrestling career
- Ring names: Dr. Wagner III; El Hijo de Dr. Wagner Jr.; Hijo de Dr. Wagner Jr.; Hijo del Dr. Wagner Jr.
- Billed height: 185 cm (6 ft 1 in)
- Billed weight: 105 kg (231 lb)
- Billed from: Torreón, Coahuila, México
- Trained by: El Oriental; Esther Moreno; Rossy Moreno
- Debut: December 9, 2009

El Hijo de Dr. Wagner Jr. (born December 4, 1991) is a Mexican professional wrestler, currently working promotions Lucha Libre AAA Worldwide (AAA) and WWE. As of September 2026, he is one-half of the AAA World Tag Team Champions alongside his brother Galeno. He is also a former one-time AAA Latin American Champion. He is best known for his tenure in Pro Wrestling Noah. El Hijo de Dr. Wagner's real name is not a matter of public record, as is often the case with masked wrestlers in Mexico where their private lives are kept a secret from the wrestling fans. He is the grandson of Dr. Wagner and the son of Dr. Wagner Jr. His mother is professional wrestler Rossy Moreno and he is part of both the Wagner and the Moreno wrestling families.

== Personal life ==
El Hijo de Dr. Wagner Jr. is the son of Juan Manuel González Barrón and Rossy Moreno, both professional wrestlers with his father working as the masked wrestler Dr. Wagner Jr. He is the grandson of wrestlers Dr. Wagner and Alfonso "Acorazado" Moreno, patriarchs of the Wagner and Moreno wrestling families. He is the nephew of Silver King (son of Dr. Wagner). On his mother's side, he is the nephew of wrestlers Noé Astro Moreno León (better known as El Oriental), Alda Moreno, Esther Moreno, Cynthia Moreno, Mini Cibernético, Groond XXX and Extasis. He was trained for his professional wrestling career by his mother, his aunt Esther and uncle El Oriental, as they had more of an active role in his training that Juan Manuel González since the divorce of González and Moreno.

== Professional wrestling career ==
=== Mexico (2009–present) ===
In Mexico, masked wrestlers closely guard their private lives, which means that if they have never been officially unmasked during their career their birth names are kept secret from the general public. Some wrestlers, especially second or third-generation wrestlers, often assume a different ring identity before revealing their family relationship. It has not been verified that El Hijo de Dr. Wagner worked under a different identity before December 9, 2009, when he made his debut under that name, but it is possible that the debut date given is only for the "El Hijo de Dr. Wagner" character. Before his official debut, he was at times referred to as "Dr. Wagner III" ("Dr. Wagner the Third") by some lucha libre publications, but that name was never officially used. He made his debut on a Perros del Mal show on December 25, 2009, teaming with C. Manson, X-Fly and his uncle Groon XXX; the team defeated El Oriental, Halloween, Hysteria Extreme and Máscara Año 2000 Jr. In March, 2010, he teamed up with his father for a show in Monterrey, Nuevo Leon, where they lost to Lucha Libre AAA World Wide (AAA) representatives El Mesias and Black Warrior. Three days later, he teamed up with lucha libre legends Blue Demon Jr. and El Hijo del Santo; the trio lost to Los Perros del Mal (Damian 666, Halloween and Mr. Águila) when Hijo de Dr. Wagner was pinned. His father had had a long running rivalry with L.A. Park, a rivalry that would extend to the next generation as El Hijo de Dr. Wagner began working against El Hijo de L.A. Park throughout Mexico. The rivalry saw the Wagners take on the Parks in a match on September 2, 2010, where Dr. Wagner Jr. and his son defeated L.A. Park and his son. A few days later, Hijo de Dr. Wagner and Hijo de L.A. Park were teamed up for Organizacion Independiente de Lucha Libre's (OILL) Torneo De Parejas Juniors Bicentenario ("Bicentennial Juniors Tag Team Tournament"). The two rivals were able to defeat Kung Fu Jr. and Ultraman Jr. in the semi-finals and then defeat El Hijo del Fishman and El Hijo del Canek in the finals to win the tournament. A few months later, OILL held a ''Ruleta de la Muete tag team tournament, where the losing team would advance in the tournament and then at the end the last team would face off under Luchas de Apuestas ("Bet match") rules where the loser would be forced to unmask. The tournament included the teams of Hijo de Dr. Wagner and Máscara Jr., Histeria and El Hijo de Fishman, El Canek Jr. and Black Abyss. Hijo de Dr. Wagner's team lost to Canek Jr. and Black Abyss and thus were forced to wrestle against each other with their masks on the line. In the end, Hijo de Dr. Wagner pinned his opponent, forcing Máscara Jr. to unmask.

On July 12, 2010, Hijo de Dr. Wagner worked the Promociones Gutiérrez 1st Anniversary Show, a show co-produced by the local promotion and Consejo Mundial de Lucha Libre (CMLL), one of Mexico's biggest promotions. Hijo de Dr. Wagner teamed up with Hijo de L.A. Park and Scorpio Jr. to take on CMLL regulars La Máscara, Máscara Dorada and Valiente. The teams split the first two falls between them and, in the final fall, Scorpio Jr. drew a disqualification for landing a low blow on La Máscara and subsequently unmasking him in front of the referee. After the match, Scorpio Jr. and Hijo de L.A. Park attacked Hijo de Dr. Wagner Jr., which resulted in the surprise of the night as his father, Dr. Wagner Jr., came to the ring to save him from the attack. Dr. Wagner Jr. came out in full wrestling gear, with the AAA Mega Championship strapped around his waist to the surprise of everyone in attendance. After running off his son's attackers, he posed in the ring with his son, then circled the ring to allow the front row to get a closer look at him. Dr. Wagner Jr. did not make any announcements or comments during his appearance, just posed with his son and interacted with the fans before leaving the arena. In 2010, El Hijo de Dr. Wagner formed a regular tag team with El Hijo del Medico Asesino called La Ola Blanca, referencing the team of Dr. Wagner and Ángel Blanco. The duo worked for a number of independent promotions in Mexico until El Hijo del Medico Asesino signed a development contract with World Wrestling Entertainment in the early part of 2011.

El Hijo de Dr. Wagner began making regular appearances for International Wrestling Revolution Group (IWRG) in 2011, including the main event of IWRG's Guerra del Golfo ("Gulf War") show in which he wrestled in a Steel cage match where the loser would be forced to defend his mask later that night in a Luchas de Apuestas match. The match also included Black Terry, El Ángel, El Hijo del Diablo, El Hijo del Pantera, Masada and Trauma I and loser Multifacético. He teamed up with El Canek Jr. to compete in IWRG's 2011 Guerra de Empresas ("War of the Promotions"), representing the independent circuit. The team lost to AAA representatives Los Psycho Circus (Monster Clown and Psycho Clown) in the first round of the tournament. Less than a month later, IWRG held another Guerra de Empresas tournament; this time he teamed up with Trauma I, only to be eliminated in the first round when they, as well as opponents El Hijo de Pirata Morgan and Lizmark Jr., were both counted out. In late 2011, El Hijo de Dr. Wagner was one of several wrestlers who worked a "try out" for WWE, hoping to impress the officials enough to earn a contract. At the time, El Hijo de Dr. Wagner was not offered a contract. On March 15, 2012, El Hijo de Dr. Wagner was one of ten men wrestling in the main event of IWRG's Rebelión de los Juniors where the winner would get a match for the IWRG Junior de Juniors Championship later on. The match was contested under torneo cibernetico elimination rules. It also included Apolo Estrada Jr., Bestia 666, Carta Brava Jr., El Canek Jr., El Hijo de L.A. Park, Halcón 78 Jr., Hijo de Pirata Morgan, Máscara Sagrada Jr. and Ultraman Jr. Hijo de Dr. Wagner was the seventh man eliminated from the match as he was pinned by rival Hijo de L.A. Park. A few months later he was one of 10 men who competed in a Luchas de Apuestas steel cage match along with rival El Hijo de L.A. Park, El Ángel, Oficial AK-47, Carta Brava Jr., Carta Brava Jr. (II), Oficial Factor, El Hijo de Máscara Año 2000, El Hijo de Pirata Morgan, Veneno and Violencia Jr. Hijo de Dr. Wagner escaped the cage about halfway through, keeping his mask safe. The following month he competed in yet another steel cage match with the same concept, called El Castillo del Terror ("The Tower of Terror"), and again with his main rival El Hijo de L.A. Park as one of the other nine participants. Once again, Hijo de Dr. Wagner mainly focused on Hijo de L.A. Park throughout the match and escaped the cage only moments before his rival was able to do the same, keeping his mask safe. For IWRG's celebration of Arena Naucalpan 35th Anniversary, Hijo de Dr. Wagner teamed up with his father to face four other "wrestling families" inside a steel cage: the families included the Canek family (Canek and Canek Jr.), La Familia de Tijuana (Damian 666 and X-Fly), Los Junior Dinamitas (Máscara Año 2000 Jr. and Hijo de Máscara Año 2000) and Los Piratas (Pirata Morgan and Hijo de Pirata Morgan. The match ended when Los Piratas were the last wrestlers in the ring after the Wagners were able to escape.

=== Pro Wrestling Noah (2019–2025) ===
On July 29, 2019, as part of a working relationship between Pro Wrestling Noah and Major League Wrestling, it was announced that El Hijo de Dr. Wagner Jr., would take part of Noah's premier tournament N-1 Victory. The following month, Wagner finished the tournament with a record of one win and four losses, failing to advance to the finals of the tournament. During the tournament, Wagner joined the Sugiura-gun stable, as its first gaijin member. In April 2020, as part of Sugiura-gun, Wagner and Sugiura-gun newest member Rene Dupree formed the Sugiura-gun International. Afterwards, Wagner and Dupree took part in the 2020 Global Tag League, finishing the tournament with a record of two wins and one loss, advancing to the finals of the tournament. On April 18, Wagner and Dupree defeated AXIZ (Go Shiozaki and Katsuhiko Nakajima) in the finals to win the tournament. The following day, Wagner and Dupree defeated Masaaki Mochizuki and Naomichi Marufuji to win the GHC Tag Team Championship. On August 10, Wagner and Dupree returned the titles to Noah, due to being unable to attend Noah's events in relation to travel restrictions because of the COVID-19 pandemic, vacating the titles in the process.

Following the mitigation of the COVID-19 travel restrictions, on March 23, 2022, it was announced that Wagner and Dupree, billed as "Les Mexicanas" would be returning to Sugiura-gun on April 30 at Majestic. On May 4, Wagner and Dupree defeated Sugiura-gun stablemates Hideki Suzuki and Takashi Sugiura to regain the GHC Tag Team Championship. They lost the titles to Masa Kitamiya and Michael Elgin on May 21. On November 10 at Global Honored Crown 2022, Wagner defeated Masakatsu Funaki to win the GHC National Championship, becoming the first non-Japanese wrestler to hold the title. In August 2023, Wagner took part in the 2023 N-1 Victory, finishing the tournament with a record of four wins and three losses, failing to advance to the finals of the tournament. On October 28 at Demolition Stage In Fukuoka, Wagner Jr. lost the GHC National Championship to Jack Morris, in his seventh title defense, ending his reign at 352 days, the longest reign in the title's history.

On January 13, 2024, Wagner challenged Kenoh to a title match for the GHC Heavyweight Championship. Wagner wanted to challenge him in 2019, with Kenoh accepting. Afterwards, Kenoh offered a handshake, which he accepted and then pulled Kenoh close so the two were butting heads. On February 4 at Cross Over in Sendai 2024, Wagner defeated Kenoh to win the GHC Heavyweight Championship, for the first time. With this victory, Wagner became the second gaijin wrestler (the other being Eddie Edwards) and the first Mexican to hold the title. He lost the title to Kaito Kiyomiya on May 4 at Wrestle Magic. In August, Wagner took part in the 2024 N-1 Victory. Despite winning his opening match, on August 11, it was announced that Wagner would be absent the remainder of the tournament due to injury, leading him to forfeit the remainder of his matches. He made his return from injury on September 1.

On January 2, 2025 at New Year Reboot, Wagner announced that he would be returning to Mexico, and his last match in NOAH, would be on January 11.

=== WWE (2025–present) ===
Wagner made his WWE debut at the WWE and AAA event Worlds Collide on June 7, 2025, teaming up with Pagano and Psycho Clown in a losing effort against Legado Del Fantasma (Santos Escobar, Angel, and Berto).

On October 25, 2025 at NXT Halloween Havoc, Wagner unsuccessfully challenged for Ethan Page's NXT North American Championship in a Day of The Dead Deathmatch. During the match, his mask was half-ripped. On December 20, 2025 at Guerra de Titanes, Wagner successfully retained the AAA Latin American Championship against Ethan Page.

On March 6, 2026 at his SmackDown debut, Wagner answered Carmelo Hayes' open challenge for the WWE United States Championship. Despite the loss, he showed respect to Carmelo after the match.

On June 30, 2026 on Galeno's and his NXT debut, they unsuccessfully challenged The Vanity Project (Brad Baylor and Ricky Smokes) for the NXT Tag Team Championship.

== Championships and accomplishments ==
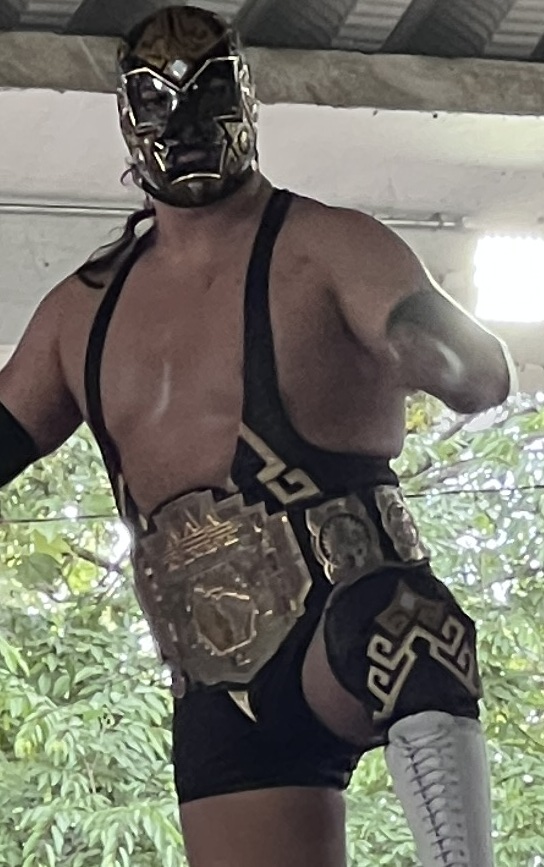
El Hijo de Dr. Wagner Jr. is a one time AAA Latin American Champion

- Organizacion Independiente de Lucha Libre
  - Torneo De Parejas Juniors Bicentenario (2010) – with El Hijo de L.A. Park
- Lucha Libre AAA Worldwide
  - AAA Latin American Championship (1 time)
  - AAA World Tag Team Championship (1 time, current) – with Galeno
- Mas Lucha
  - Torneo Supreme Tournament (2023)
- Pro Wrestling Illustrated
  - Ranked No. 50 of the top 500 singles wrestlers in the PWI 500 in 2024
- Pro Wrestling Noah
  - GHC Heavyweight Championship (1 time)
  - GHC National Championship (1 time)
  - GHC Tag Team Championship (2 times) – with René Duprée
  - Global Tag League (2020) – with Rene Duprée
- Texas Wrestling Cartel
  - TWC Tag Team Championship (1 time, current) – with Galeno del Mal
- The Crash Lucha Libre
  - The Crash Tag Team Championship (1 time) – with Galeno del Mal
- Universal Wrestling Entertainment
  - UWE Tag Team Championship (1 time) – with El Hijo de Dos Caras
- Federacíon Mundial De Lucha Libre
  - FMLL Tag Team Championship (1 time) – with Rey Wagner Jr.
- Xtreme Warriors Wrestling
  - XWW Tag Team Championship (1 time) – with El Hijo del Médico Asesino

== Lucha de Apuesta record ==
Winner (wager)	Loser (wager)	Location	Event	Date	Notes
El Hijo de Dr. Wagner Jr. (mask)	Máscara Jr.	Pachuca, Hidalgo	Live event	November 23, 2010	(Note: The team of El Hijo de Dr. Wagner Jr. and Máscara Jr. lost a Ruleta de la Muete match to the teams of Histeria and El Hijo de Fishman and El Canek Jr. and Black Abyss and were forced to wrestle each other.)
