= Hideki Suzuki =

Japanese professional wrestler (born 1980)

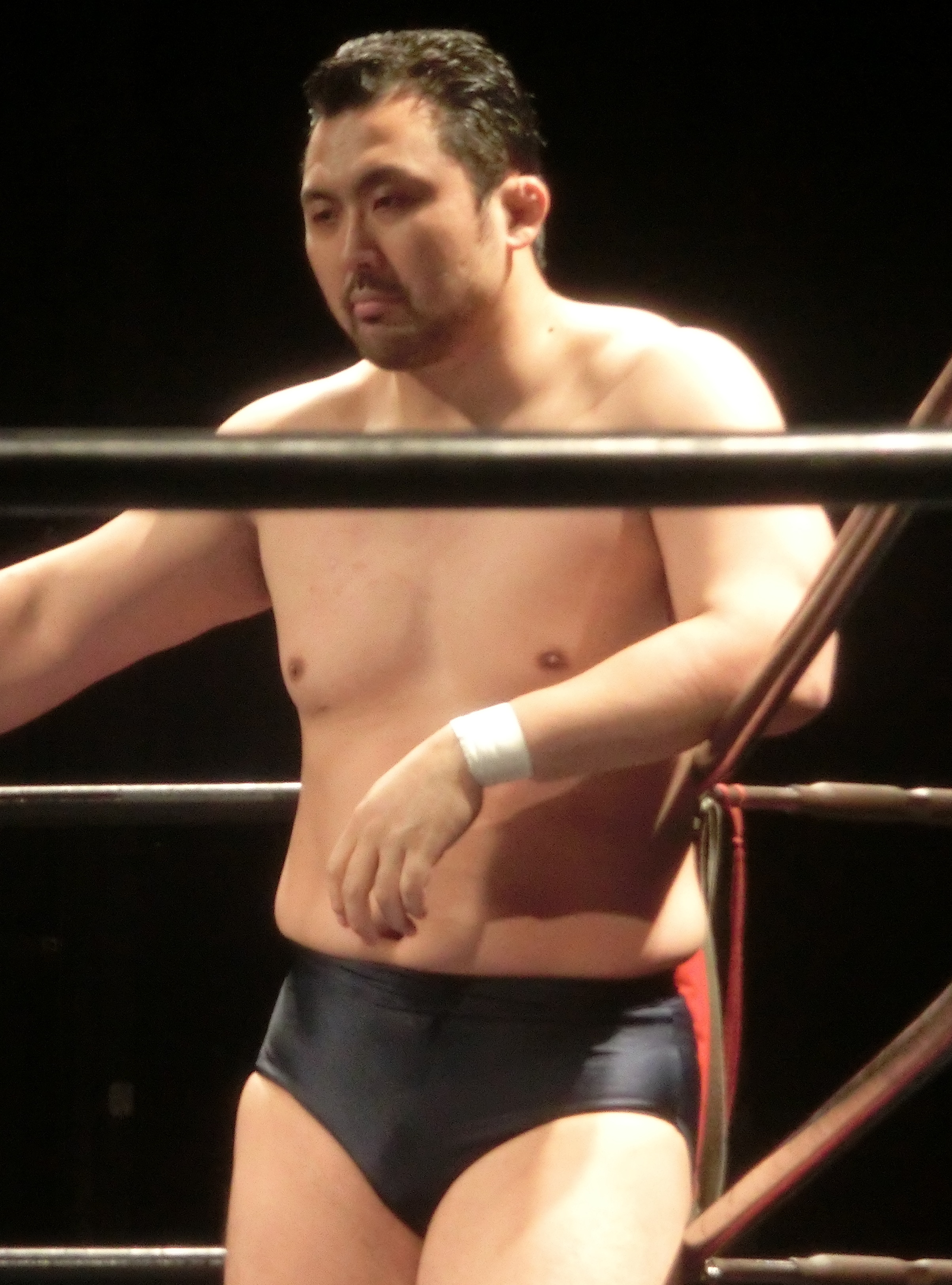
- Suzuki in June 2018

Personal information
- Born: Hideki Suzuki (鈴木 秀樹, Suzuki Hideki); February 18, 1980 (age 46) Kitahiroshima, Hokkaido

Professional wrestling career
- Ring name(s): Hachiman; Hideki Suzuki
- Billed height: 191 cm (6 ft 3 in)
- Billed weight: 110 kg (243 lb)
- Trained by: Antonio Inoki; Billy Robinson
- Debut: November 24, 2008

Hideki Suzuki (鈴木 秀樹, Suzuki Hideki; born February 18, 1980) is a Japanese professional wrestler and catch wrestler. He is signed to All Japan Pro Wrestling.

Trained by Billy Robinson, Suzuki started his career with the Inoki Genome Federation (IGF) promotion in 2008. In 2014, he left IGF to become a freelancer, starting to work for promotions such as Big Japan Pro Wrestling (BJW), Pro Wrestling Zero1 (Zero1) and Wrestle-1 (W-1). He is a former two-time BJW World Strong Heavyweight Champion, a former one-time Zero1 World Heavyweight, NWA United National Heavyweight, Wrestle-1 Champion and NWA Intercontinental Tag Team Champion. In 2017, Fighting TV Samurai named Suzuki the MVP in Japanese independent wrestling. In 2021, Suzuki signed with WWE, where he performed on the NXT brand under the ring name Hachiman as a member of Diamond Mine, and also worked as a coach at the WWE Performance Center.

== Professional wrestling career ==
=== Inoki Genome Federation (2008–2014) ===
With a background in judo and football, Suzuki was trained in professional wrestling at the U.W.F. Snake Pit Japan dojo. After four years of training under British wrestler Billy Robinson, he made his debut for the Inoki Genome Federation (IGF) promotion on November 24, 2008, losing to Hiromitsu Kanehara. For the next three years, Suzuki worked undercards of IGF events. His status finally began to rise in 2012 following a match with Peter Aerts. On May 26, 2013, Suzuki won the second Inoki Genome tournament, defeating Akira Joh in the finals. As a result, he received his first shot at the IGF Championship on October 26, but was defeated by the defending champion, Kazuyuki Fujita. The following March, Suzuki left IGF to become a freelancer.

=== Freelance (2014–2021) ===
Suzuki then began working regularly for Pro Wrestling Zero1 (Zero1), while also making appearances for promotions such as All Japan Pro Wrestling (AJPW), DDT Pro-Wrestling (DDT), and Pro Wrestling Noah (Noah). Suzuki quickly received a shot at Zero1's World Heavyweight Championship, though losing to defending champion, Kohei Sato, on May 6. On August 3, 2014, Suzuki finally won his first professional wrestling championship in Zero1, defeating Tama Williams for the NWA United National Heavyweight Championship. In November, Suzuki took part in special week, where Zero1 co-produced three events with the Wrestle-1 promotion.

Through the continued relationship between Zero1 and Wrestle-1, Suzuki began also making appearances for the latter promotion, where he found himself a rival in Kai. On March 8, 2015, after Kai had captured the Wrestle-1 Championship, Suzuki immediately confronted the new champion and challenged him to a title match. The match took place on April 1 and saw Suzuki defeat Kai in just seven minutes to become the new Wrestle-1 Champion. On May 5, Suzuki put both of his championships on the line at separate Zero1 and Wrestle-1 shows, losing the NWA United National Heavyweight Championship to Kamikaze and retaining the Wrestle-1 Championship against Ryota Hama. On June 27, Suzuki returned to IGF for the first time since his departure from the promotion, first defeating Wang Bin in the opening round and then Daichi Hashimoto in the finals to win the Genome-1 2015 Nagoya tournament. Following the win, Suzuki formed an "anti-IGF" stable with foreigners Erik Hammer, Kevin Kross and Knux. On July 12, Suzuki lost the Wrestle-1 Championship back to Kai in his third defense. On November 1, Suzuki defeated Kohei Sato to win Pro Wrestling Zero1's World Heavyweight Championship. On February 26, 2016, Suzuki returned to IGF, when he was appointed the leader of a new stable named Hagure IGF Gundan ("Rogue IGF Corps"), which also included Kazuyuki Fujita, Kendo Kashin and Shogun Okamoto. On March 27, Suzuki lost the World Heavyweight Championship to Kohei Sato.

On March 5, 2017, Suzuki challenged Daisuke Sekimoto for the Big Japan Pro Wrestling (BJW) World Strong Heavyweight Championship. After wrestling to a thirty-minute time limit draw, Suzuki and Sekimoto agreed to a rematch on March 30. Suzuki went on to win the rematch to become the new World Strong Heavyweight Champion. On September 14, Suzuki and Kohei Sato defeated Shogun Okamoto and Yutaka Yoshie to win the vacant NWA Intercontinental Tag Team Championship. After five successful title defenses, Suzuki lost the BJW World Strong Heavyweight Championship to Daichi Hashimoto on December 17. Suzuki claimed that losing the title cost him most of his bookings and that he was facing unemployment heading into 2018. On January 1, 2018, Suzuki and Sato lost the NWA Intercontinental Tag Team Championship to Masayuki Okamoto and Yutaka Yoshie.

On April 4, 2019 at Josh Barnett's Bloodsport, Suzuki defeated Timothy Thatcher via knockout.

=== WWE (2021–2022) ===
In April 2021, Suzuki signed with WWE as a coach in the Performance Center. Despite his work as coach, Suzuki would begin to work on NXT's weekly show as a pro wrestler under the name of Hachiman, as a part of the villainous stable Diamond Mine, alongside Roderick Strong, Tyler Rust (who was released several weeks later) and Malcolm Bivens. Within the coming months, The Creed Brothers (Brutus and Julius Creed) and Ivy Nile would also join the stable. On January 5, 2022, Suzuki was released from his WWE contract.

=== Pro Wrestling Noah (2022–2023) ===
On February 24, 2022 it was announced that Suzuki would be returning to Japan to wrestle for Pro Wrestling Noah (Noah). On March 13, 2022 Suzuki would team with Takashi Sugiura to win the GHC Tag Team Championship by defeating the team of Daiki Inaba & Kaito Kiyomiya at Noah Great Voyage In Yokohama 2022.

=== All Japan Pro Wrestling (2023–present) ===
Suzuki started making regular appearances for All Japan Pro Wrestling from July 16, 2023. Forming the Baka no Jidai (era of idiots) tag team with Suwama. The two would go on to compete in back to back Real World Tag leagues in 2023 and 2024. As well as win the World Tag Team Championships on February 25, 2024. Suzuki would also take part in the 2024 edition of the Champion Carnival. Finishing in joint second place in his block with eight points.

On January 2, 2025. Suzuki formally joined All Japan on a full time basis. Signing a contract with the promotion.

He entered in the 2025 edition of Champions Carnival, where in Semi Finals, he was knocked out by Rei Saito. He went on to win the 2026 edition of the same tournament. Defeating Go Shiozaki on May 17.

== Other media ==
Suzuki's first book, entitled Biru Robinson Den Kyatchi Azu Kyatchi Kyan Nyūmon (ビル・ロビンソン伝 キャッチ アズ キャッチ キャン入門; "Billy Robinson: Catch as Catch Can Primer"), was released on January 19, 2017. The book is about wrestling techniques taught to Suzuki by Billy Robinson.

== Championships and accomplishments ==
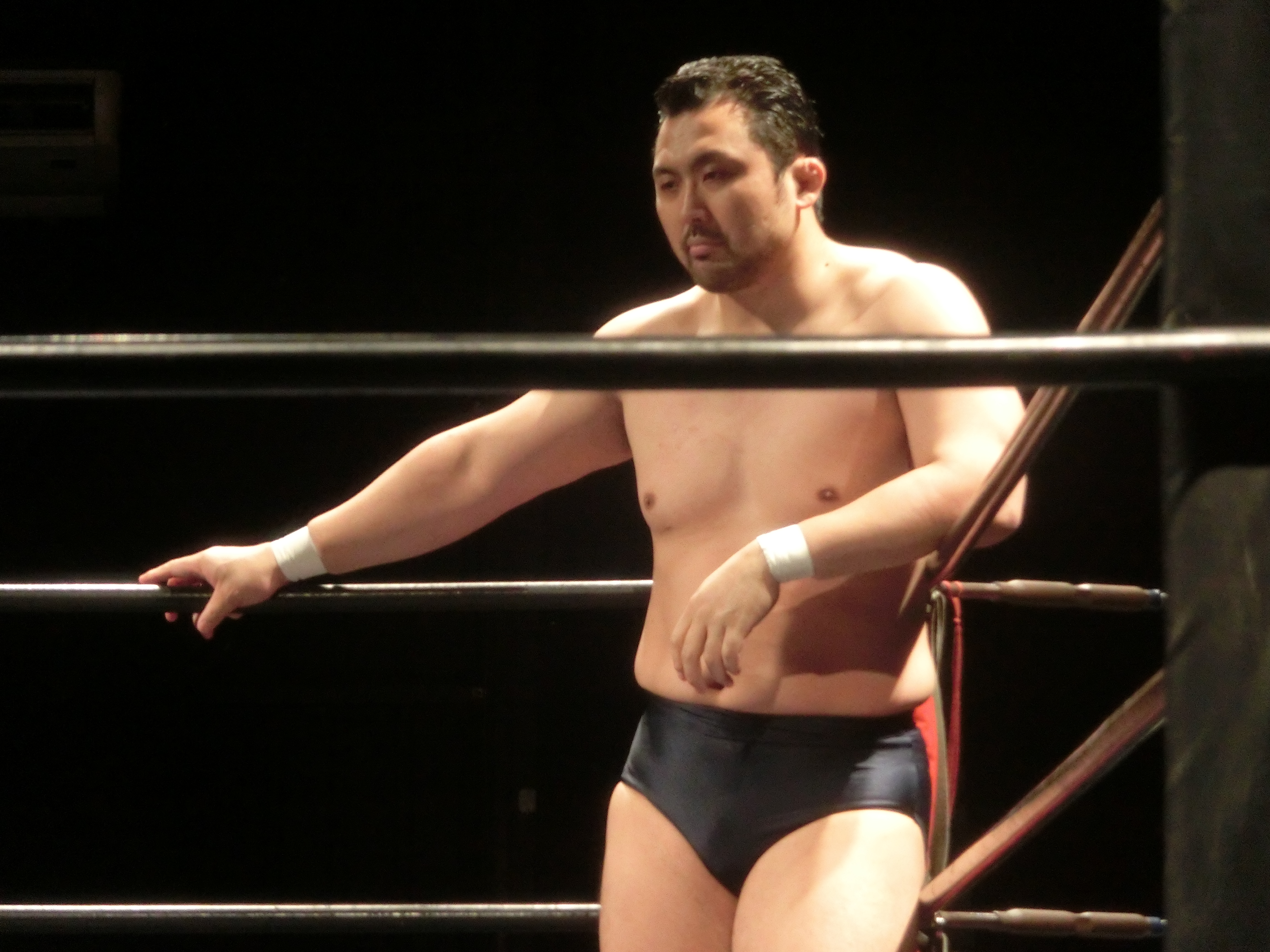
Suzuki in 2019.

- All Japan Pro Wrestling
  - World Tag Team Championship (2 times) – with Suwama (1) and Kengo Mashimo (1)
  - AJPW TV Six-Man Tag Team Championship (2 times) – with Dan Tamura and Suwama (1), and Masayuki Kono and Shota Kofuji (1)
  - Champion Carnival (2026)
- Big Japan Pro Wrestling
  - BJW World Strong Heavyweight Championship (2 times)
  - Yokohama Shopping Street 6-Man Tag Team Championship (1 time) – with Takuya Nomura and Yoshihisa Uto
  - Ikkitousen Strong Climb (2018)
- Game Changer Wrestling
  - Bloodsport Bushido One Day Tournament (2024)
- Ice Ribbon
  - Triangle Ribbon Championship (1 time)
- Inoki Genome Federation
  - 2nd Inoki Genome Tournament (2013)
  - Genome-1 2015 Nagoya
- Japan Indie Awards
  - MVP Award (2017)
- Pro-Wrestling Basara
  - Shinjuku Chijō Saidai Budōkai Tournament (2017)
- Pro Wrestling Illustrated
  - Ranked No. 108 of the top 500 singles wrestlers in the PWI 500 in 2026
- Pro Wrestling Noah
  - GHC Tag Team Championship (2 times) – with Takashi Sugiura (1) and Timothy Thatcher (1)
- Pro Wrestling Zero1
  - NWA Intercontinental Tag Team Championship (1 time) – with Kohei Sato
  - NWA United National Heavyweight Championship (1 time)
  - World Heavyweight Championship (1 time)
  - Five-Man Tag Team Tournament (2015) – with Masato Tanaka, Shinjiro Otani, Yusaku Obata and Kohei Sato
- Tenryu Project
  - Tenryu Project United National Heavyweight Tag Team Championship (1 time) – with Hikaru Sato
- Tokyo Sports
  - Technique Award (2017)
- Toshikoshi Puroresu
  - Shuffle Tag Tournament (2017) – with Konosuke Takeshita
- Wrestle-1
  - Wrestle-1 Championship (1 time)
