= Noah Memorial Voyage in Yokohama =

2025 Pro Wrestling Noah event

NOAH Memorial Voyage in Yokohama
- Promotional poster of the event featuring Ozawa and Manabu Soya
- Promotion: CyberFight
- Brand: Pro Wrestling Noah
- Date: March 2, 2025
- City: Yokohama, Japan
- Venue: Yokohama Budokan
- Attendance: 1,605

Pay-per-view chronology
← Previous; Star Navigation Premium 2025 (Night 2)	Next → Star Navigation Premium 2025 (Night 3)

Noah Memorial Voyage in Yokohama was a professional wrestling event promoted by CyberFight's sub-brand Pro Wrestling Noah and took place on March 2, 2025, in Yokohama, Japan, at the Yokohama Budokan. Broadcasting was made on CyberAgent's AbemaTV online linear television service and CyberFight's streaming service Wrestle Universe. The event featured the finals of the 2025 edition of the Global Junior Heavyweight Tag League.

Eight matches were contested at the event, including two on the pre-show. The main event saw Ozawa defeat Manabu Soya to retain the GHC Heavyweight Championship and win the GHC National Championship in a Winner Takes All Lumberjack Deathmatch, only to relinquish the latter title after the match.

== Background ==
=== Storylines ===
The event featured professional wrestling matches that resulted from scripted storylines, where wrestlers portrayed villains, heroes, or less distinguishable characters in the scripted events that built tension and culminated in a wrestling match or series of matches.

=== Event ===
The event started with two preshow confrontations broadcast live on Noah's YouTube channel. In the first one, Alejandro, Kai Fujimura, Eita and Daiki Odashima picked up a victory over Atsushi Kotoge, Hajime Ohara, Jun Masaoka and Gaia Hox in eight-man tag team competition. In the second one, Anthony Greene and Zozaya defeated Shuhei Taniguchi and Black Menso-re in tag team action.

In the first main card bout, Kaito Kiyomiya and Galeno outmatched Takashi Sugiura and Masao Inoue in tag team competition. Next up, Jack Morris, Daga, Tetsuya Endo and Owadasan picked up a victory over Hayata, Yo-Hey, Tadasuke and Yuto Kikuchi in eight-man tag team competition. The fifth match saw Kenoh and Kenta defeat Kazuyuki Fujita and Ulka Sasaki in tag team competition. Next up, Masa Kitamiya defeated Naomichi Marufuji in singles action. The semi main event saw Amakusa and Junta Miyawaki defeate Mark Trew and Kieron Lacey by referee stoppage to win the 2025 edition of the Global Junior Heavyweight Tag League. Trew got injured during match, subsequently handing the victory to Amakusa and Miyawaki.

In the main event, Ozawa defeated Manabu Soya in a Winner takes all Lumberjack Deathmatch in which Ozawa secured his second successful defense of the GHC Heavyweight Championship and won Soya's GHC National Championship, ending his reign at 19 days and no defenses. During the bout, Tadasuke betrayed Ratel's stablemates during the lumberjack ringside action to join Team 2000X. Ozawa relinquished the National Championship right after the match. Masa Kitamiya stepped up as Ozawa's next challenger for the Heavyweight title.

== Results ==
No.	Results	Stipulations	Times
1^{P}	All Rebellion (Alejandro and Kai Fujimura), Eita and Daiki Odashima defeated Team Noah (Atsushi Kotoge and Hajime Ohara) and F-Swag (Jun Masaoka and Gaia Hox) by pinfall	Eight-man tag team match	11:42
2^{P}	Anthony Greene and Zozaya defeated Shuhei Taniguchi and Black Menso-re by pinfall	Tag team match	9:22
3	All Rebellion (Kaito Kiyomiya and Galeno) defeated Dark Agents (Takashi Sugiura and Masao Inoue) by pinfall	25th Anniversary special tag team match	14:12
4	Team 2000X (Jack Morris, Daga, Tetsuya Endo and Owadasan) defeated Ratel's (Hayata, Yo-Hey, Tadasuke and Yuto Kikuchi) by pinfall	Eight-man tag team match	11:13
5	Kenoh and Kenta defeated Kazuyuki Fujita and Ulka Sasaki by pinfall	Tag team match	15:23
6	Masa Kitamiya defeated Naomichi Marufuji by pinfall	25th Anniversary Ark Legend singles match	16:35
7	Amakusa and Junta Miyawaki defeated Mark Trew and Kieron Lacey by referee stoppage	Global Junior Heavyweight Tag League finals	10:40
8	Ozawa (Heavyweight) (c) defeated Manabu Soya (National) (c) by pinfall	Winner Takes All Lumberjack Deathmatch for the GHC Heavyweight Championship and GHC National Championship	23:08
(c) / – the champion(s) heading into the match; P / – the match was broadcast on the pre-show
