= Noah Memorial Voyage in Kokugikan =

2025 Pro Wrestling Noah event

NOAH Memorial Voyage in Kokugikan
- Promotional poster of the event
- Promotion: CyberFight
- Brand: Pro Wrestling Noah
- Date: May 3, 2025
- City: Tokyo, Japan
- Venue: Ryogoku Kokugikan
- Attendance: 4,521

Pay-per-view chronology
← Previous; Star Navigation Premium 2025 (Night 3)	Next → Star Navigation 2025

Noah 25th Anniversary Memorial Voyage in Kokugikan was a professional wrestling event promoted by CyberFight's sub-brand Pro Wrestling Noah and took place on May 3, 2025, in Tokyo, Japan, at the Ryogoku Kokugikan. Broadcasting was made on CyberAgent's AbemaTV online linear television service and CyberFight's streaming service Wrestle Universe.

Ten matches were contested at the event, including one dark match, and five of Noah's seven championships were on the line. The main event saw Ozawa defeat Kenta to retain the GHC Heavyweight Championship. In other prominent matches, Yo-Hey defeated Eita to win the GHC Junior Heavyweight Championship, and Kenoh and Ulka Sasaki defeated Team 2000X (Jack Morris and Daga) to win the GHC Tag Team Championship.

== Background ==
=== Storylines ===
The event featured professional wrestling matches that result from scripted storylines, where wrestlers portrayed villains, heroes, or less distinguishable characters in the scripted events that built tension and culminated in a wrestling match or series of matches.

=== Event ===
The event started with the dark singles confrontation between Daiki Odashima and Yuto Kikuchi solded with the victory of the latter.

In the first main card bout, Los Golpeadores (Dragón Bane and Alpha Wolf) defeated Amakusa and Junta Miyawaki to win the GHC Junior Heavyweight Tag Team Championship, ending the latter teams' reign at 42 days and one defense. Next up, Mohammed Yone, Kazuyuki Fujita, Atsushi Kotoge, Hajime Ohara and Black Menso-re picked up a victory over Masa Kitamiya, Shuhei Taniguchi, Kai Fujimura, Alejandro and Harutoki in ten-man tag team competition. The fourth bout saw Tadasuke defeat Hayata in singles competition where the special guest referee was Manabu Soya. In the fifth bout, Galeno del Mal defeated Saxon Huxley to secure the first successful defense of the GHC National Championship in that respective reign. Next up, Kenoh and Ulka Sasaki defeated Jack Morris and Daga to win the GHC Tag Team Championship, ending the champion teams' reign at 27 days and no defenses. The seventh bout saw Yo-Hey defeat Eita to win the GHC Junior Heavyweight Championship, ending the latters' reign at 122 days and three defenses. Next up, Jun Akiyama and Takashi Sugiura defeated Tetsuya Endo and Owadasan in tag team competition. In the semi main event, Kaito Kiyomiya defeated Naomichi Marufuji in singles competition.

In the main event, Ozawa defeated Kenta to secure the fourth successful defense of the GHC Heavyweight Championship in that respective reign. After the bout concluded, Kaito Kiyomiya stepped up as Ozawa's next challenger.

== Results ==
No.	Results	Stipulations	Times
1^{D}	Yuto Kikuchi defeated Daiki Odashima by pinfall	Singles match	9:24
2	Los Golpeadores (Dragón Bane and Alpha Wolf) defeated Amakusa and Junta Miyawaki (c) by pinfall	Tag team match for the GHC Junior Heavyweight Tag Team Championship	11:37
3	Mohammed Yone, Kazuyuki Fujita, Atsushi Kotoge, Hajime Ohara and Black Menso-re defeated Masa Kitamiya, Shuhei Taniguchi and All Rebellion (Kai Fujimura, Alejandro and Harutoki) by pinfall	Ten-man tag team match	9:56
4	Tadasuke defeated Hayata by pinfall	Singles match Manabu Soya served as the special guest referee.	9:03
5	Galeno del Mal (c) defeated Saxon Huxley by pinfall	Singles match for the GHC National Championship	5:28
6	Kenoh and Ulka Sasaki defeated Team 2000X (Jack Morris and Daga) (c) by pinfall	Tag team match for the GHC Tag Team Championship	13:24
7	Yo-Hey defeated Eita (c) by pinfall	Singles match for the GHC Junior Heavyweight Championship	13:08
8	Jun Akiyama and Takashi Sugiura defeated Team 2000X (Tetsuya Endo and Owadasan) by pinfall	Tag team match	16:49
9	Kaito Kiyomiya defeated Naomichi Marufuji by pinfall	Singles match	16:57
10	Ozawa (c) defeated Kenta by pinfall	Singles match for the GHC Heavyweight Championship	26:45
(c) / – the champion(s) heading into the match; D / – this was a dark match
