= Noah Star Navigation Premium 2025 =

2025 Pro Wrestling Noah event

NOAH Star Navigation Premium 2025 (Night 1)
- Promotional poster featuring Manabu Soya and Tetsuya Endo
- Promotion: CyberFight
- Brand: Pro Wrestling Noah
- Date: January 11, 2025
- City: Tokyo, Japan
- Venue: Korakuen Hall
- Attendance: 1,535

Pay-per-view chronology
← Previous; The New Year 2025	Next → Memorial Voyage in Yokohama

Star Navigation chronology
← Previous; Star Navigation Premium: Akitoshi Saito Road Last	Next → Star Navigation Premium 2025 (Night 2)

Noah Star Navigation Premium 2025 was a multiple-night professional wrestling event promoted by CyberFight's sub-brand Pro Wrestling Noah. The pay-pre-view nights of the event took place on January 11, February 11 and March 22, 2025, in Tokyo, Japan, at the Korakuen Hall. Broadcasting was made on CyberAgent's AbemaTV online linear television service and CyberFight's streaming service Wrestle Universe. The second night of the event featured the first block matches of the 2025 edition of the Global Junior Heavyweight Tag League.

== Background ==
=== Storylines ===
The event featured professional wrestling matches that resulted from scripted storylines, where wrestlers portrayed villains, heroes, or less distinguishable characters in the scripted events that built tension and culminated in a wrestling match or series of matches.

== Night 1 ==
=== Event ===
The first night of the event took place on January 11, 2025, at the Korakuen Hall.

The event started with the eight man tag team confrontation in which Eita, Shuji Kondo, Amakusa and Junta Miyawaki picked up a victory over Hayata, Tadasuke, Yo-Hey and Yuto Kikuchi. Next up, Ulka Sasaki and Zozaya outmatched Black Menso-re and Mohammed Yone in tag team action. The third bout saw Kazuyuki Fujita, Go Shiozaki, Atsushi Kotoge and Hajime Ohara defeating Naomichi Marufuji, Takashi Sugiura, Masa Kitamiya and Daiki Odashima in eight-man tag team competition. Next up, Hijo del Dr. Wagner Jr. and Galeno del Mal defeated LJ Cleary and Saxon Huxley in tag team competition. In the fifth bout, Daga and Yu Owada outmatched Alejandro and Kai Fujimura in tag team competition. Next up, Jack Morris and Omos picked up a victory over Harutoki and Kaito Kiyomiya in tag team competition. In the seventh bout, Ozawa and Kenoh wrestled into a no contest. In the semi main event, Daga, Jack Morris, Omos, Ozawa, Yoshitatsu and Yu Owada defeated Alejandro, Kai Fujimura, Kaito Kiyomiya and Kenoh in a six-on-four handicap match.

In the main event, Tetsuya Endo defeated Manabu Soya to win the GHC National Championship, ending the latter's reign at 119 days and four defenses.

=== Results ===
No.	Results	Stipulations	Times
1	Eita, Shuji Kondo, Amakusa and Junta Miyawaki defeated Ratel's (Hayata, Tadasuke, Yo-Hey and Yuto Kikuchi) by pinfall	Eight-man tag team match	7:59
2	Ulka Sasaki and Zozaya defeated Black Menso-re and Mohammed Yone by pinfall	Tag Team match	6:53
3	Kazuyuki Fujita and Team Noah (Go Shiozaki, Atsushi Kotoge and Hajime Ohara) defeated Naomichi Marufuji, Takashi Sugiura, Masa Kitamiya and Daiki Odashima by pinfall	Eight-man tag team match	9:21
4	La Dinastía Wagner (Hijo del Dr. Wagner Jr. and Galeno del Mal) defeated LJ Cleary and Saxon Huxley by pinfall	Tag Team match	11:15
5	Team 2000X (Daga and Yu Owada) defeated All Rebellion (Alejandro and Kai Fujimura) by pinfall	Tag Team match	12:02
6	Team 2000X (Jack Morris and Omos) defeated All Rebellion (Harutoki and Kaito Kiyomiya) by pinfall	Tag Team match	6:58
7	Ozawa vs. Kenoh ended in a no contest	Singles match	16:46
8	Team 2000X (Daga, Jack Morris, Omos, Ozawa, Yoshitatsu and Yu Owada) defeated All Rebellion (Alejandro, Kai Fujimura, Kaito Kiyomiya and Kenoh) by pinfall	6-on-4 handicap tag team match	7:24
9	Tetsuya Endo defeated Manabu Soya (c) by pinfall	Singles match for the GHC National Championship	19:30
(c) / – the champion(s) heading into the match

== Night 2 ==
NOAH Star Navigation Premium 2025 ~ NOAH Jr. Tag League 2025 ~ (Night 2)
- Promotional poster of the event featuring Ozawa and Galeno del Mal
- Promotion: CyberFight
- Brand: Pro Wrestling Noah
- Date: February 11, 2025
- City: Tokyo, Japan
- Venue: Korakuen Hall
- Attendance: 1,560

Pay-per-view chronology
← Previous; Star Navigation Premium 2025 (Night 1)	Next → Memorial Voyage in Yokohama

=== Event ===
The second night of the event took place on February 11, 2025, at the Korakuen Hall.

The event started with the tag team confrontation between Anthony Greene and Zozaya, and Amakusa and Junta Miyawaki, solded with the victory of the latter team. Next up, Haturoki defeated Owadasan in singles competition. The third bout saw Naomichi Marufuji, Takashi Sugiura and Kazuyuki Fujita picking up a victory over Masa Kitamiya, Ulka Sasaki and Shuji Kondo in six-man tag team competition. In the fourth bout, Tadasuke and Yuto Kikuchi defeated Atsushi Kotoge and Hajime Ohara in a Global Junior Heavyweight Tag League Block A match. In the fourth bout, Mark Trew and Kieron Lacey defeated Hayata and Yo-Hey in another Global Junior Heavyweight Tag League block match. Next up, Manabu Soya defeated Tetsuya Endo to win the GHC National Championship, ending the latter's reign at 31 days and no defenses. After the bout concluded, Soya was presented as the newest member of Ratel's. The seventh bout saw Alejandro and Kai Fujimura picking up a victory over Eita and Daiki Odashima in a junior tag league block match. In the semi main event, Kenoh and Kenta defeated Kaito Kiyomiya and Shuhei Taniguchi in tag team competition. After the bout concluded, Kenoh announced that he was parting ways with All Rebellion.

In the main event, Ozawa defeated Galeno del Mal to secure the first successful defense of the GHC Heavyweight Championship in that respective reign. After the bout concluded, Manabu Soya challenged Ozawa to a winner takes all match for both the Heavyweight and National titles in a match set to take place on March 2, 2025.

=== Results ===
No.	Results	Stipulations	Times
1^{D}	Amakusa and Junta Miyawaki defeated Anthony Greene and Zozaya by pinfall	Tag team match	9:52
2	Haturoki defeated Owadasan by pinfall	Singles match	4:38
3	Naomichi Marufuji, Takashi Sugiura and Kazuyuki Fujita defeated Masa Kitamiya, Ulka Sasaki and Shuji Kondo by pinfall	Six-man tag team match	9:21
4	Ratel's (Tadasuke and Yuto Kikuchi) defeated Team Noah (Atsushi Kotoge and Hajime Ohara) by pinfall	Global Junior Heavyweight Tag League Block B match	2:19
5	Mark Trew and Kieron Lacey defeated Ratel's (Hayata and Yo-Hey) by pinfall	Global Junior Heavyweight Tag League Block A match	9:33
6	Manabu Soya defeated Tetsuya Endo (c) by pinfall	Singles match for the GHC National Championship	12:20
7	All Rebellion (Alejandro and Kai Fujimura) defeated Eita and Daiki Odashima by pinfall	Global Junior Heavyweight Tag League Block A match	10:10
8	Kenoh and Kenta defeated Kaito Kiyomiya and Shuhei Taniguchi by pinfall	Tag team match	17:50
9	Ozawa (c) defeated Galeno del Mal by pinfall	Singles match for the GHC Heavyweight Championship	25:49
(c) / – the champion(s) heading into the match; D / – this was a dark match

== Night 3 ==
NOAH Star Navigation Premium 2025 (Night 3)
- Promotional poster of the event featuring Ozawa and Masa Kitamiya
- Promotion: CyberFight
- Brand: Pro Wrestling Noah
- Date: March 22, 2025
- City: Tokyo, Japan
- Venue: Korakuen Hall
- Attendance: 1,550

Pay-per-view chronology
← Previous; Memorial Voyage in Yokohama	Next → Memorial Voyage in Kokugikan

Star Navigation chronology
← Previous; Star Navigation Premium 2025 (Night 2)	Next → Star Navigation 2025 (Night 1)

=== Event ===
The third night of the event took take place on March 22, 2025, at the Korakuen Hall.

In the first bout of the event, Kazuyuki Fujita and Daiki Odashima picked up a victory over Knull and Bryce Hansen in tag team competition. Next up, Kaito Kiyomiya, Galeno, Kai Fujimura and Harutoki outmatched Jack Morris, Daga, Tadasuke and Owadasan in eight-man tag team competition. The third bout saw Manabu Soya, Yuto Kikuchi and Saxon Huxley defeating Naomichi Marufuji, Kenoh and Hajime Ohara. Huxley was presented as the newest member of Ratel's. Next up, Tetsuya Endo defeated Takashi Sugiura in the first round matches of a tournament for the vacant GHC National Championship.

In the fifth bout, Kenta defeated Ulka Sasaki in singles competition. The sixth bout saw Amakusa and Junta Miyawaki defeat Hayata and Yo-Hey to win the GHC Junior Heavyweight Tag Team Championship, ending the latter teams' reign at 202 days and five defenses. In the semi main event, Eita defeated Alejandro to secure the second successful defense of the GHC Junior Heavyweight Championship in that respective reign.

In the main event, Taishi Ozawa defeated Masa Kitamiya to secure the third consecutive defense of the GHC Heavyweight Championship in that respective reign.

=== Results ===
No.	Results	Stipulations	Times
1	Kazuyuki Fujita and Daiki Odashima defeated Knull and Bryce Hansen by pinfall	Tag team match	11:57
2	All Rebellion (Kaito Kiyomiya, Galeno, Kai Fujimura and Harutoki) defeated Team 2000X (Jack Morris, Daga, Tadasuke and Owadasan) by pinfall	Eight-man tag team match	11:51
3	Ratel's (Manabu Soya, Yuto Kikuchi and Saxon Huxley) defeated Naomichi Marufuji, Kenoh and Hajime Ohara by pinfall	Six-man tag team match	9:44
4	Tetsuya Endo defeated Takashi Sugiura by pinfall	GHC National Championship tournament first round match	5:59
5	Kenta defeated Ulka Sasaki by pinfall	Singles match	11:22
6	Amakusa and Junta Miyawaki defeated Ratel's (Hayata and Yo-Hey) (c) by pinfall	Tag team match for the GHC Junior Heavyweight Tag Team Championship	13:02
7	Eita (c) defeated Alejandro by pinfall	Singles match for the GHC Junior Heavyweight Championship	11:20
8	Taishi Ozawa (c) defeated Masa Kitamiya by pinfall	Singles match for the GHC Heavyweight Championship	21:33
(c) / – the champion(s) heading into the match
