= Ratel's (professional wrestling) =

Professional wrestling stable

Passion Ratel's
- Current logo of the stable (2025–present)

Stable
- Members: See below
- Debut: February 21, 2017
- Years active: 2017–2020; 2024–present

Passion Ratel's (Japanese: 情熱RATEL'S, Hepburn: Jōnetsu Rateruzu), formerly knows as Ratel's, is a professional wrestling stable based in the Pro Wrestling Noah (Noah) promotion. As of 2026 the stable consists of Yo-Hey, Manabu Soya, Saxon Huxley, Daiki Inaba and Yuki Iino. During its first period of activity between 2017 and 2020, the stable was originally founded and led by Daisuke Harada.

== History ==
=== Under Daisuke Harada's leadership (2017–2020) ===
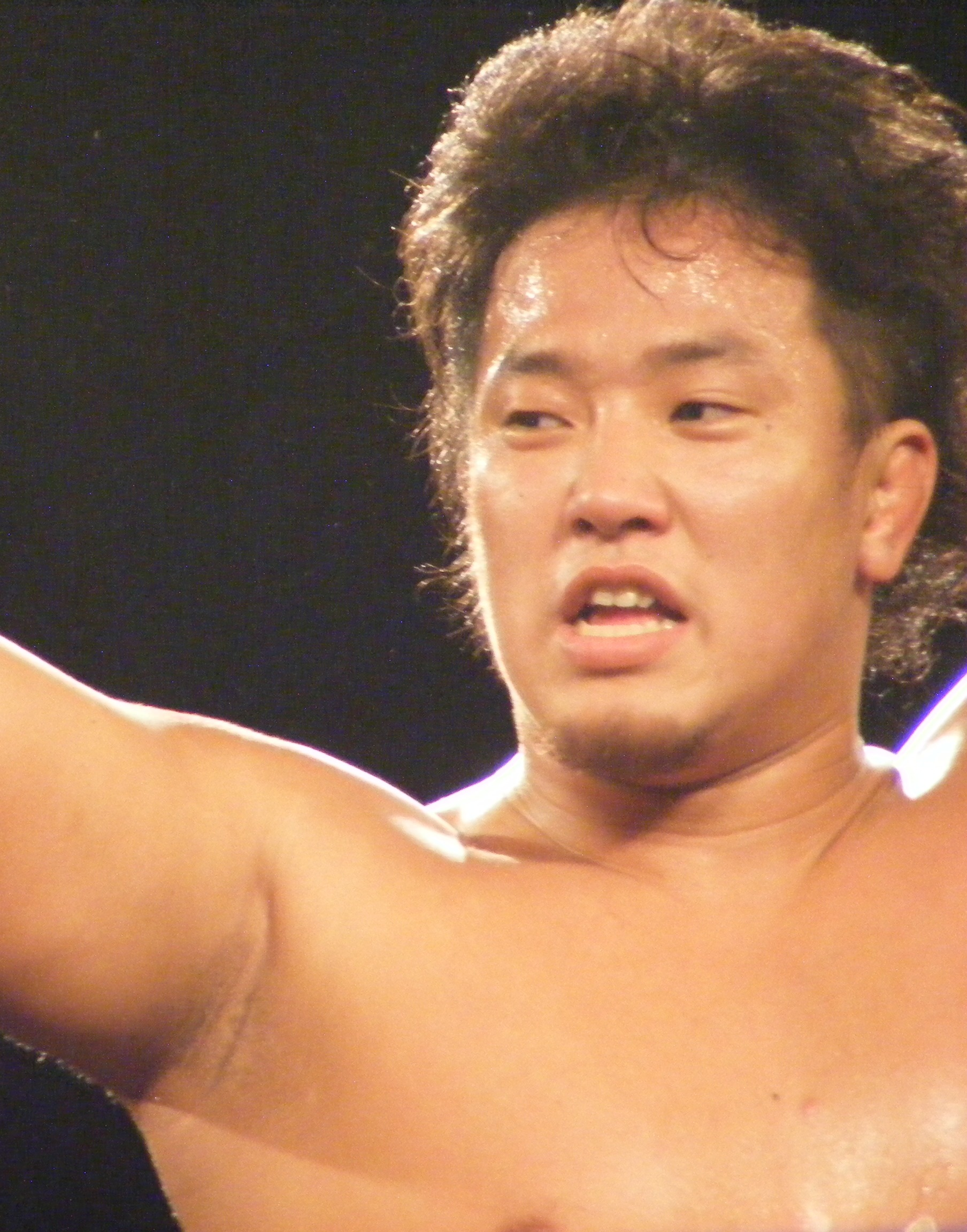
First leader of the stable, Daisuke Harada.

On the seventh night of The First Navigation 2017 on January 21, Hayata and Yo-Hey defeated Hi69 and Taiji Ishimori in tag team competition. After the bout concluded, they demanded a match for the GHC Junior Heavyweight Tag Team Championship which was vacant at the time. At The Second Navigation 2017 on February 14, Atsushi Kotoge defeated his Momo No Seishun Tag partner Daisuke Harada, match which ended their affiliation as a tag team. Four nights later on February 18, Hayata and Yo-Hey unsuccessfully wrestled XX (Hi69 and Taiji Ishimori) for the vacant junior tag team titles, only for Harada and Tadasuke to step up as the next challengers after the bout concluded. On February 21, 2017, Hayata and Harada defeated Kaito Kiyomiya and Takashi Sugiura in tag team competition. At the end of the event, they declared the formation of the stable alongside Yo-Hey and Tadasuke.

On the sixth night of the Noah Results: Navigation With Breeze 2017 from May 27, Hayata defeated Hajime Ohara to win the GHC Junior Heavyweight Championship. This marked the first time a member of the stable won a championship under its banner. Hayata would drop the title one month later to Taiji Ishimori at Great Voyage 2017 in Fukushima on June 25, failing to score any successful defenses. Hayata and Yo-Hey competed in the 2017 edition of the Global Junior Heavyweight Tag League in which thy scored a total of ten points after going against the teams of Hajime Ohara and Hitoshi Kumano, Phil Atlas and Seiya Morohashi, Daisuke Harada and Tadasuke, Mao and Shunma Katsumata, Gaston Mateo and Kaiser, and Gurukun Mask and Shuri Joe. They came second to the champion team of Hi69 and Taiji Ishimori in the final block standings, only to defeat them in the finals. Hayata and Yo-Hey proceeded in defeating the latter two again at Summer Navigation 2017 Vol. 2 on August 26 to win the GHC Junior Heavyweight Tag Team Championship.

Hayata and Yo-Hey dropped the junior tag team titles to Hi69 and Ishimori at Navigation For the Future 2018 on January 27. Hayata and Yo-Hey won the 2018 edition of the Global Junior Heavyweight Tag League as back-to-back winners with the previous year performance. During the first night of the 2018 N-1 Victory from August 30, Daisuke Harada dropped the GHC junior title to Kotaro Suzuki. Harada regained the title at Great Voyage in Yokohama Vol. 2 on December 16, 2018, in a bout with the stipulation that if Harada had lost the match, Ratel's would have had to disband. After the bout concluded, Yo-Hey turned on Harada and sided with Suzuki and Yoshinari Ogawa in their newly created stable of Stinger.

On February 1, 2019, Hayata briefly turned on Ratel's to side himself with Yo-Hey in Stinger, only to turn back on the latters a few days later. Ratel's and Stinger shared a several month feud in the process. At Great Voyage 2019 in Yokohama on March 10, Hayata and Tadasuke unsuccessfully challenged Kotaro Suzuki and Yoshinari Ogawa for the GHC Junior Heavyweight Tag Team Championship while Daisuke Harada lost the GHC Junior title to Minoru Tanaka. On May 19, 2019, Yo-Hey returned to Ratel's after the members of Stinger kicked him out of the unit due to winning the Global Junior Heavyweight Tag League alongside Hayata by defeating Suzuki and Ogawa in the finals.

At GHC National Championship: Sugiura vs. Nakajima on May 9, 2020, during a GHC Junior tag team title defense against Kotaro Suzuki and Yoshinari Ogawa, Hayata turned on Yo-Hey, joining Ogawa and Suzuki to reform Stinger, and declaring the titles vacant after relinquishing his half. Tadasuke then saved Yo-Hey and challenged Ogawa and Hayata for the vacant GHC junior tag team titles. Following Hayata's betrayal, Tadasuke officially announced the dissolution of Ratel's, with him and Yo-Hey going on separate ways after Stay Together Muta Fantasia one night later on May 10, 2020, where they fell short to Ogawa and Hayata for the vacant junior tag titles.

=== Under Hayata's leadership (2024–2025) ===
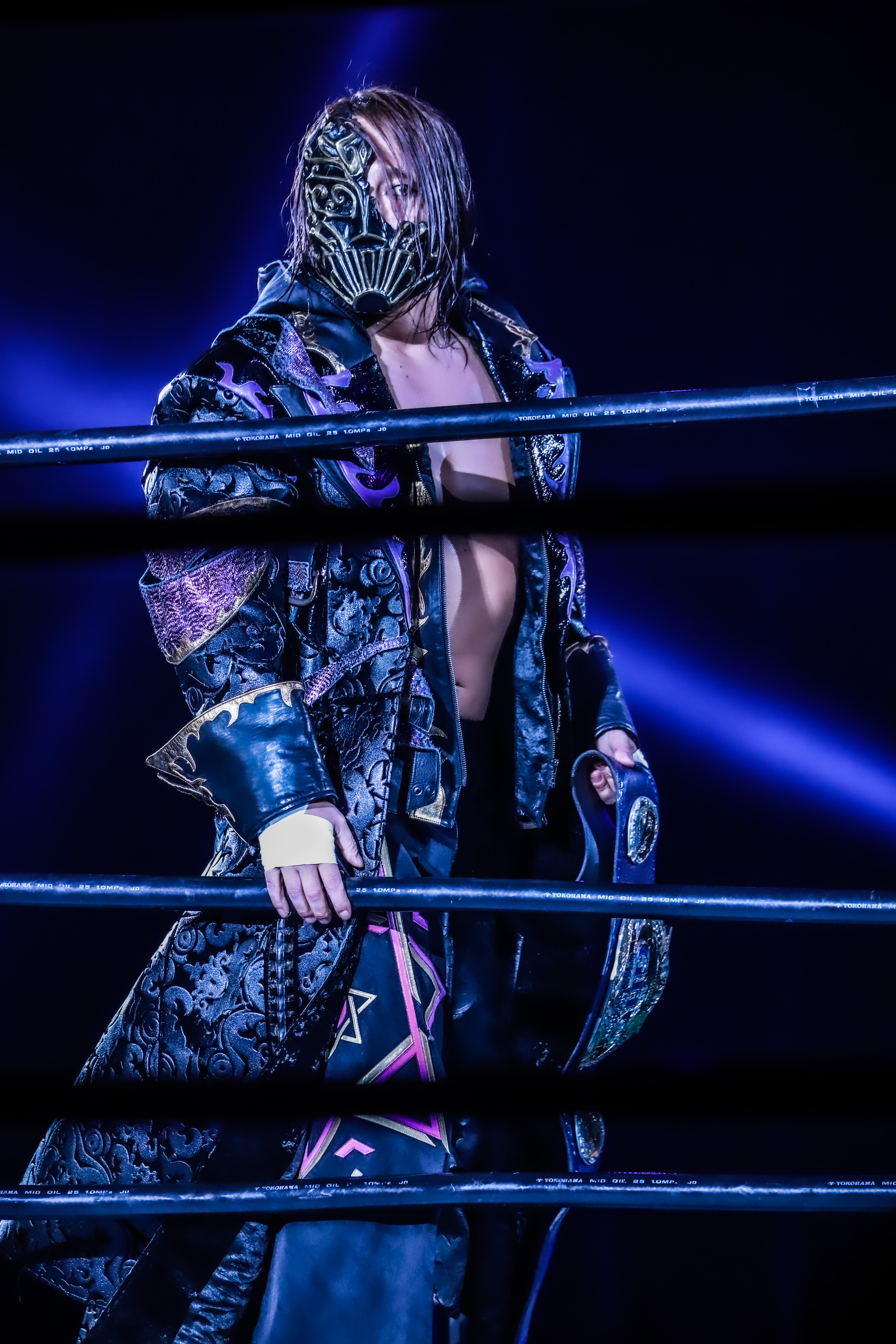
Second leader of the stable, Hayata.

The stable's second logo used between 2024 and 2025.

At Noah Destination 2024 on July 13, Hayata dropped the GHC National Championship to Ulka Sasaki. After the bout concluded, he was helped out of the arena by old stablmates Yo-Hey and Tadasuke after the latter's former unit Good Looking Guys disbanded the very same night. On the finals night of the 2024 N-1 Victory from September 1, Hayata teamed up with Yo-Hey and defeated Eita and Shuji Kondo to win the GHC Junior Heavyweight Tag Team Championship. After the bout concluded, Hayata declared that the Ratel's unit has returned to activity with Yuto Kikuchi as a new member besides himself, Tadasuke and Yo-Hey. At Star Navigation in Tokyo 2024 on September 14, the unit made their pay-per-view return as Hayata, Yo-Hey, Tadasuke and Yuto Kikuchi defeated Amakusa, Atsushi Kotoge, Hajime Ohara and Junta Miyawaki in eight-man tag team competition. At Star Navigation Premium: Akitoshi Saito Road Last on October 14, 2024, Hayata defeated rookie Daiki Odashima in singles competition and Yo-Hey and Yuto Kikuchi teamed up with Amakusa and Dragon Bane in a losing effort against Junta Miyawaki, Kai Fujimura, Tadasuke and Yu Owada. At Noah Deathnity on November 17, 2024, Hayata and Yo-Hey successfully defended the GHC junior tag titles against stablemates Tadasuke and Yuto Kikuchi in friendly competition.

At Noah The New Year 2025 on January 1, Hayata and Yo-Hey successfully defended the titles against the teams of Amakusa and Junta Miyawaki and All Rebellion (Alejandro and Kai Fujimura).

On February 11, 2025, after Manabu Soya regained the GHC National Championship from Tetsuya Endo, he was attacked by Team 2000X, before being saved by Ratel's. He was subsequently added to the stable, becoming Ratel's first heavyweight member. Shortly after, the stable was renamed to Passion Ratel's, following Soya's addition. Over the following weeks, Tetsuya Endo began trying to recruit Kikuchi into Team 2000X. On March 2 at Memorial Voyage in Yokohama, Soya faced Ozawa for the GHC Heavyweight and GHC National Championships. During the match, Endo handed a steel chair to Kikuchi and gave him the opportunity to attack Soya, only for Tadasuke to grab the chair and turn on both Kikuchi and Soya. This led to Soya losing the GHC National Championship and failing to win the GHC Heavyweight Championship to Ozawa.

On the third night of the Noah Star Navigation Premium event from March 22, 2025, Saxon Huxley was revealed as the newest member of the stable. Later that night, Hayata and Yo-Hey lost the GHC Junior Heavyweight Tag Team Championship to Amakusa and Junta Miyawaki.

=== Under Manabu Soya's leadership. Passionate Ratel's. (2025–present) ===
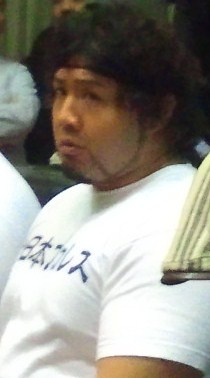
Third and current leader of the stable, Manabu Soya.

It was revealed that at Noah The New Year 2026 on January 1, 2026, Hayata would leave the stable to join the newly formed unit of "White Raven Squad". The stable's leadership was mutually passed to Manabu Soya. On February 11, 2026, Soya and a mystery partner challenged Los Tranquilos de Japón (Bushi and Tetsuya Naito) to a title match for the GHC Tag Team Championship. Three days later, Soya revealed Shuji Kondo as his partner, before Naito mocked Soya for lacking the true “passion” he used to show in his promos, suggesting that without that fire, they had no chance of winning the tag titles. Therefore on March 20, 2026, Soya and Kondo unsuccessfully challenged for the belts. On May 2, 2026 at Noah Spring Mayhem, Yuki Iino was revealed as the newest member of the stable. From May 23 to June 13, 2026 Soya and Iino took part in the 2026 Global Tag League, finishing the tournament with a record of four wins and one loss, advancing to the finals of the tournament. On June 16, Soya and Iino defeated The Good Brothers (Doc Gallows and Karl Anderson) in the finals to win the tournament. On the second night of the Noah Legacy Rise 2026 from June 25, Soya and Iino defeated Bushi and Naito to win the GHC Tag Team Championship.

== Members ==
Passion Ratel's
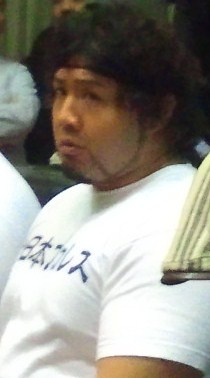
Manabu Soya (III)

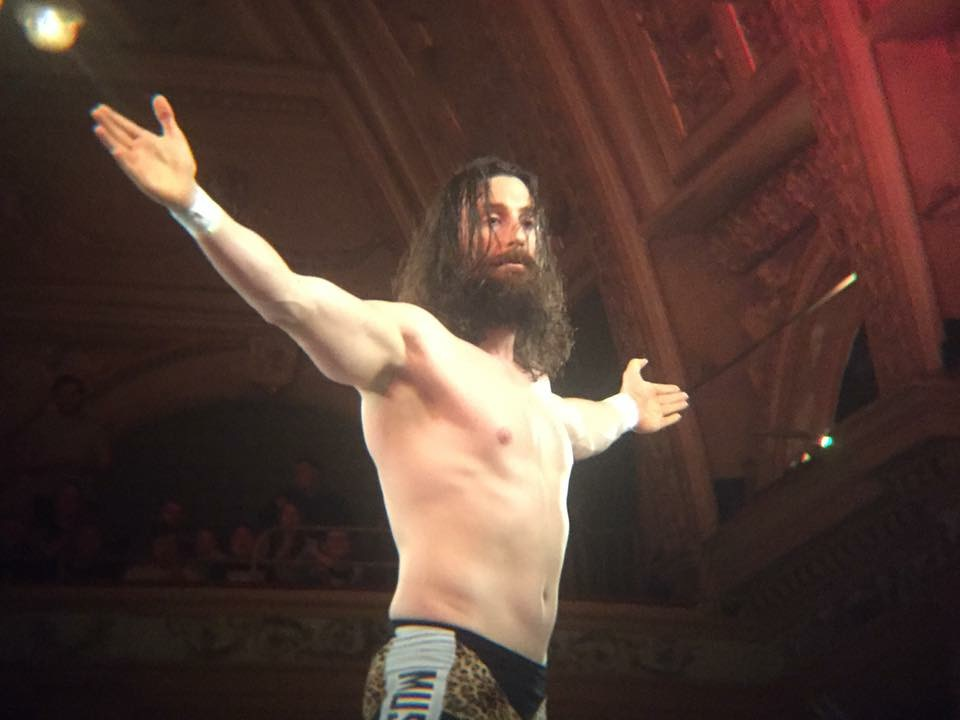
Saxon Huxley

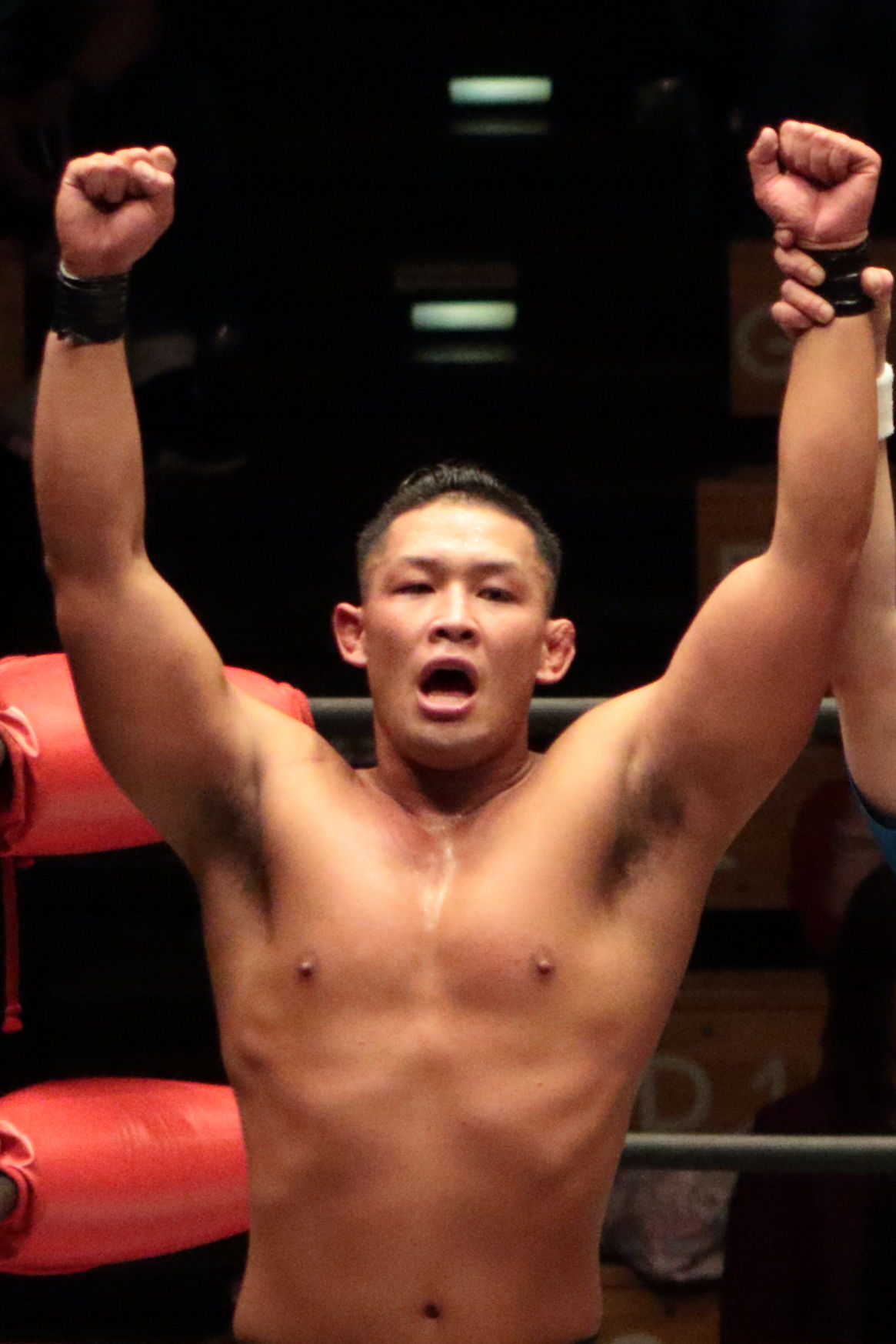
Daiki Inaba

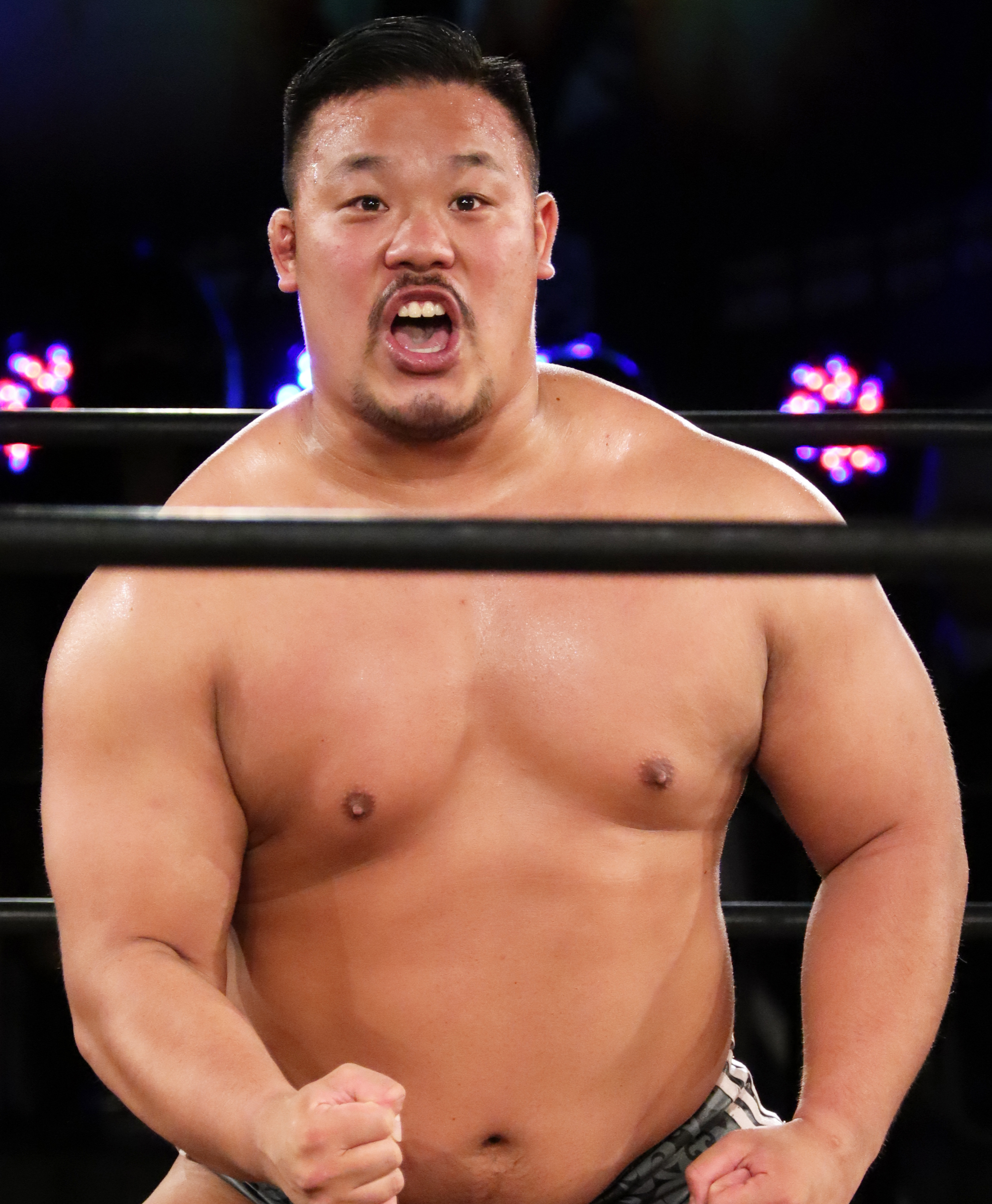
Yuki Iino

*	Founding member
I–III	Leader(s)

=== Current ===
Member		Joined
Manabu Soya	III	February 11, 2025
Saxon Huxley		March 22, 2025
Daiki Inaba		May 10, 2025
Yuki Iino		May 2, 2026

=== Former ===
Member		Joined	Left
Daisuke Harada	*I	February 21, 2017	May 9, 2020
Tadasuke	*	February 21, 2017; September 1, 2024	May 9, 2020; March 2, 2025
Hayata	*II	February 21, 2017; February 24, 2019; September 1, 2024	February 1, 2019; May 9, 2020; November 28, 2025
Yuto Kikuchi		September 1, 2024	November 28, 2025
Yo-Hey	*	February 21, 2017; May 19, 2019; September 1, 2024	December 8, 2018; May 9, 2020; August 10, 2026

== Sub-groups ==
=== Current ===
Affiliate	Members	Tenure	Type
Passion/Jōnetsu Max	Manabu Soya; Yuki Iino	2026–present	Tag Team

== Championships and accomplishments ==
- Dove Pro Wrestling
  - Dove Pro Heavyweight Championship (1 time) – Hayata
- International Pro Wrestling: United Kingdom
  - IPW:UK Junior Heavyweight Championship (2 times, inaugural) – Harada
- Pro Wrestling Noah
  - GHC National Championship (2 times) – Hayata (1) and Soya (1)
  - GHC Tag Team Championship (2 times, current) – Soya and Inaba (1), Soya and Iino (1)
  - GHC Openweight Hardcore Championship (1 time) – Hayata
  - GHC Junior Heavyweight Championship (5 times) – Hayata (2), Harada (2) and Yo-Hey (1)
  - GHC Junior Heavyweight Tag Team Championship (4 times) – Harada and Tadasuke (1) and Hayata and Yo-Hey (3)
  - Global Tag League (2026) – Soya and Iino
  - Global Junior Heavyweight Tag League (2017, 2018) – Hayata and Yo-Hey
  - Global Junior Heavyweight League (2019) – Hayata
  - Global Junior Heavyweight League (2020) – Harada
- Pro Wrestling Illustrated
  - Ranked Hayata No. 100 of the top 500 singles wrestlers in the PWI 500 of 2024
  - Ranked Yo-Hey No. 119 of the top 500 singles wrestlers in the PWI 500 of 2025
  - Ranked Soya No. 139 of the top 500 singles wrestlers in the PWI 500 of 2025
  - Ranked Harada No. 234 of the top 500 singles wrestlers in the PWI 500 of 2019
