= Noah The New Year 2025 =

2025 Pro Wrestling Noah event

NOAH The New Year 2025
- Promotional poster featuring various participants
- Promotion: CyberFight
- Brand: Pro Wrestling Noah
- Date: January 1, 2025
- City: Tokyo, Japan
- Venue: Nippon Budokan
- Attendance: 5,088

Pay-per-view chronology
← Previous; Deathnity	Next → Star Navigation Premium 2025

Noah The New Year chronology
← Previous; 2024	Next → 2026

NOAH The New Year 2025 was a professional wrestling event promoted by CyberFight's sub-brand Pro Wrestling Noah and took place on January 1, 2025, in Tokyo, Japan, at the Nippon Budokan. Broadcasting was made on CyberAgent's AbemaTV online linear television service and CyberFight's streaming service Wrestle Universe. It was the first pay-per-view promoted by Noah in 2025.

Eleven matches were contested at the event. In the main event, Ozawa defeated Kaito Kiyomiya to win the GHC Heavyweight Championship. In other prominent matches, WWE United States Champion Shinsuke Nakamura defeated Ulka Sasaki, Team 2000X (Jack Morris and Omos) defeated Naomichi Marufuji and Takashi Sugiura to win the GHC Tag Team Championship, and Kenta defeated Kenoh. The event was also notable for the debut of WWE superstar Omos.

== Background ==
=== Storylines ===
The event featured eleven professional wrestling matches that resulted from scripted storylines, where wrestlers portrayed villains, heroes, or less distinguishable characters in the scripted events that built tension and culminated in a wrestling match or series of matches.

=== Event ===
The event started with three preshow bouts broadcast live on Noah's YouTube channel. In the first one, Tadasuke won the Noah The Rumble by last eliminating LJ Cleary. In the second bout, Hayata and Yo-Hey defeated Amakusa and Junta Miyawaki and All Rebellion (Alejandro and Kai Fujimura) in a three-way tag team match to secure the fifth consecutive defense of the GHC Junior Heavyweight Tag Team Championship in that respective reign. In the third bout, Go Shiozaki, Muhammad Yone, Atsushi Kotoge and Hajime Ohara picked up a victory over Kazuyuki Fujita, Shuji Ishikawa, Tetsuya Endo and Black Menso-re in eight-man tag team competition.

In the first main card match, Kazuyuki Fujita wrestled Daiki Odashima into a time-limit draw. The stipulation of the match was that Odashima had to pin Fujita in under one minute time in order to pick up the victory. Next up, Galeno del Mal defeated El Hijo de Dr. Wagner Jr. in a special singles match. The sixth bout saw Kenta outmatching Kenoh in a Noah 25th Anniversary special match. Next up, Eita defeated Daga to win the GHC Junior Heavyweight Championship, ending the latter's reign at 122 days and one defense.

In the eighth match, Manabu Soya defeated Masa Kitamiya to secure the third consecutive defense of the GHC National Championship in that respective reign. Next up, Jack Morris and Omos defeated Naomichi Marufuji and Takashi Sugiura to win the GHC Tag Team Championship, ending the latter team's reign at 199 days and four defenses.

In the first bout of the double main event, the reigning WWE United States Champion Shinsuke Nakamura defeated Ulka Sasaki in a non-title match. In the final confrontation of the event, Ozawa defeated Kaito Kiyomiya to win the GHC Heavyweight Championship, ending the latter's reign at 242 days and seven defenses.

== Results ==
No.	Results	Stipulations	Times
1	Tadasuke won by last eliminating LJ Cleary (Note: The other participants were Daiki Odashima, Yu Owada, Harutoki, Shuhei Taniguchi, Yuto Kikuchi, Masao Inoue, Saxon Huxley, Zozaya , Masaaki Mochizuki, Titus Alexander and Dump Matsumoto.)	Noah The Rumble	23:54
2	Ratel's (Hayata and Yo-Hey) (c) defeated Amakusa and Junta Miyawaki and All Rebellion (Alejandro and Kai Fujimura) by pinfall	Three-way tag team match for the GHC Junior Heavyweight Tag Team Championship	8:20
3	Team Noah (Go Shiozaki, Muhammad Yone, Atsushi Kotoge and Hajime Ohara) defeated Kazuyuki Fujita, Shuji Ishikawa, Tetsuya Endo and Black Menso-re by pinfall	Eight-man tag team match	8:25
4	Kazuyuki Fujita vs. Daiki Odashima ended in a time-limit draw	Singles match	1:00
5	Galeno del Mal defeated El Hijo de Dr. Wagner Jr. by pinfall	Singles match	9:52
6	Kenta defeated Kenoh by pinfall	Noah 25th Anniversary special match	15:24
7	Eita defeated Daga (c) 2–1	Two-out-of-three falls match for the GHC Junior Heavyweight Championship	12:36
8	Manabu Soya (c) defeated Masa Kitamiya by pinfall	Singles match for the GHC National Championship	12:51
9	Team 2000X (Jack Morris and Omos) defeated Naomichi Marufuji and Takashi Sugiura (c) by pinfall	Tag team match for the GHC Tag Team Championship	10:48
10	Shinsuke Nakamura defeated Ulka Sasaki by pinfall	Singles match	14:57
11	Ozawa defeated Kaito Kiyomiya (c) by pinfall	Singles match for the GHC Heavyweight Championship	29:34
(c) / – the champion(s) heading into the match
