= Yuto Kikuchi =

Japanese wrestler (born 1999)

Personal information
- Born: 23 January 1999 (age 27) Osaka, Japan

Professional wrestling career
- Ring name: Kubota #3 Yuto Yuto Kikuchi
- Billed height: 170 cm (5 ft 7 in)
- Billed weight: 80 kg (176 lb)
- Trained by: Hayata
- Debut: 2015

Yuto Kikuchi (菊池悠斗, Kikuchi Yuto) is a Japanese professional wrestler. He is signed to Dotonbori Pro Wrestling. He is best known for his tenure with Pro Wrestling Noah where he was a member of the Passionate Ratel's stable. He also performs various promotions from the Japanese independent scene.

== Professional wrestling career ==
=== Japanese independent circuit (2015–present) ===
Kikuchi often competes in Osaka Pro Wrestling. He competed in one of the promotion's signature events, the Tennōzan, in which he made his first appearance at the 2022 edition where he defeated Ares in the first rounds, then fell short to Toru Matsunaga in the second. He competed in the inaugural tournament of the Osaka Light Heavyweight Championship in which he fell short to Ultimate Spider Jr. in the first rounds.

=== Dotonbori Pro Wrestling (2015–present) ===
Kikuchi has shared a decade-long tenure with Dotonbori Pro Wrestling. He made his professional wrestling debut at Dotonbori Pro Kuuga 20th Anniversary Show on October 4, 2015, where he fell short to Eisa8 in singles competition. During his time with the promotion, he won three of the four available men's titles, the WDW, WDW Tag Team and WDW Six Man Tag Team Championship.

=== Pro Wrestling Noah (2024–present) ===
Kikuchi made his debut in Pro Wrestling Noah at NOAH Limit Break ex. on March 20, 2024, where he teamed up with Harutoki in a losing effort against Hi69 and Mohammed Yone. Kikuchi continued his work in the promotion's pay-per-views at Noah Limit Break 2 on May 29, 2024, where he teamed up with Muhammad Yone to defeat Shuji Ishikawa and Black Menso-re.

Kikuchi competed in various of the promotion's signature events such as the Noah Jr. Grand Prix, tournament in which he made his first appearance at the 2025 edition where he fell short to Hayata in the first rounds. In the Noah Jr. Tag League, Kikuchi made his first appearance at the 2025 edition where he teamed up with Ratel's stablemate Tadasuke, placing themselves in the B block of the competition, scoring a total of four points after going against the teams of Amakusa and Junta Miyawaki, Jun Masaoka and Gaia Hox, and Atsushi Kotoge and Hajime Ohara, failing to qualify for the finals.

==== Passionate Ratel's (2024–2025) ====
Kikuchi joined the Passionate Ratel's at the beginning of September 2024 and made his debut in a flagship event of the promotion at Noah Star Navigation in Tokyo 2024 on September 14, where he teamed up with stablemates Hayata, Yo-Hey, Tadasuke to defeat Amakusa, Atsushi Kotoge, Hajime Ohara and Junta Miyawaki. At Noah Star Navigation Premium: Akitoshi Saito Road Last on October 14, 2024, he teamed up with Yo-Hey, Amakusa and Dragon Bane in a losing effort against Junta Miyawaki, Kai Fujimura, Tadasuke and Yu Owada. At Noah Deathnity on November 17, 2024, Kikuchi teamed up with Tadasuke to unsuccessfully challenge stablemates Hayata and Yo-Hey for the GHC Junior Heavyweight Tag Team Championship.

At Noah The New Year 2025 on January 1, Kikuchi participated in the traditional Noah The Rumble, bout won by Tadasuke which also featured notable opponents such as Zozaya , Masaaki Mochizuki, Titus Alexander and Dump Matsumoto. At Noah Memorial Voyage in Kokugikan on May 3, 2025, he defeated Daiki Odashima in singles competition. At Noah Wrestle Odyssey 2025 on October 11, he teamed up with Manabu Soya in a losing effort against All Rebellion (Galeno and Harutoki).

== Championships and accomplishments ==
- Dotonbori Pro Wrestling
  - WDW Championship (1 time, current)
  - WDW Tag Team Championship (2 times) – with Harutoki
  - WDW Six Man Tag Team Championship (1 time) – with Orochi and Violence Dragon
