= Hiryū High School =

Private high school in Shizuoka Prefecture, Japan

Hiryū High School 飛龍高等学校
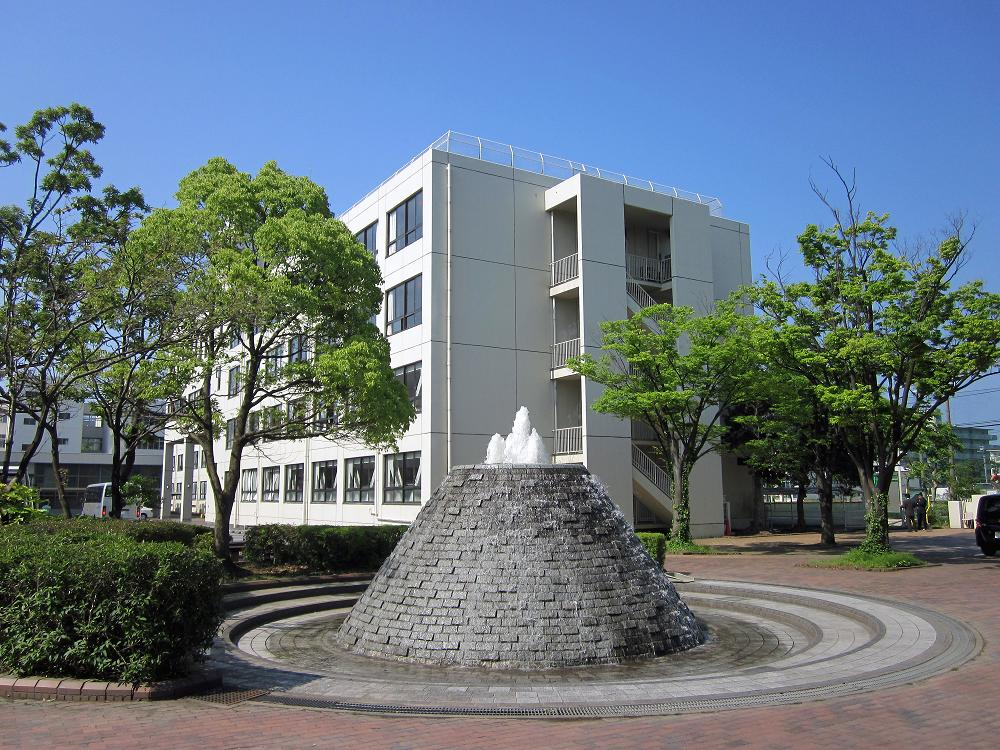
- Hiryū High School in 2012

Location
- 491 Higashikumando, Numazu, Shizuoka 410-0013, Japan; Shizuoka Prefecture; Numazu, Japan; 35.1164°N 138.8677°E

Information
- Former name: Numazu Gakuen High School
- School type: Private, Coeducational
- Motto: 工夫しつゝ、悦び生活する (Define and enjoy life)
- Established: 1942
- Founder: Miya Koremura
- School number: 048-624-6488
- School code: 22506B
- Director: Hiroyuki Saitō
- Principal: Hideo Sakane
- Enrollment: approx. 3000 students
- Colors: sea green, dark slate blue
- Mascot: chrysanthemum-tailed dragon
- Website: In Japanese https://hiryu.ed.jp/

Hiryū High School is a private junior and senior high school located in Numazu, Shizuoka Prefecture. The school is operated by the educational corporation Numazu Gakuen.

The school is particularly well known for its men's basketball and baseball clubs. The school's sumo club also has a long tradition, having been founded in the 70s, and has achieved numerous successes on the national scene.

== History ==
The school was founded in March 1942 as Numazu Gakuen High School for Girls and officially opened its doors on April 1 of that year. In April 1946, the school gave up teaching exclusively to girls and became coeducational. In the 1960s, the school opened several new departments, all of which focused on professional and economic activities. In 1958, a Commerce course was created, followed by a Food Industry course. Finally, in 1969, a course on the automotive industry was created. During the same period, commerce and home economics were withdrawn from the women's courses, which now focus solely on the food and clothing industries. In 1982, specialized and gendered courses were abolished and all courses were open to students of all genders. In 1990, a training center was built and in 1992, the now popular Ihigiri Festival was established. In 2003, the school adopted its current name, and in 2005, the various courses adopted new programs and names. In 2018 a scandal erupted as it was discovered that two of the school's teachers were teaching without a license. In the midst of the controversy, Principal Hiroyuki Ide resigns from his position and was replaced the following month by the current principal.

The school's name, Hiryū (飛龍), lit. 'leaping dragon', was inspired by Han Feizi's parable which shows that, like a dragon who relies on the clouds to fly, heroes and sages demonstrate their talent over time, building on their experiences to reach new heights. The school uses a chrysanthemum leaf as its emblem because Shinji Aoki, the school's founder, wanted an inspiring symbol to reflect the spirit of responsibility and hard work - noble values - that he wanted to instill in his school. As the chrysanthemum is a symbol of Japanese nobility, it was decided to use it as the emblem.

== Features and characteristics ==
=== Courses ===
Hiryū High School has four main courses:

==== General Course Comprehensive Sports course ====
A course particularly geared towards the pursuit of a sporting career. The course is presented in such a way as to enable students to go on to universities known for their sports programs (such as Waseda University or Nihon University), vocational schools or to enter the professional field directly (particularly in sumo, where the school has good links with Isegahama stable).

==== General Course Future Quest course ====
A course specially designed for learning technical sciences and preparing for competitive exams at major universities. The course itself is divided into four options. The first of these is "Enter school", an option to prepare for university or vocational school entrance exams. The second option redirects students more towards youth care professions. The third redirects students towards IT design professions. Finally, the last option is a more generalist course designed to complement the knowledge of students wishing to remain in general fields of study.

==== General Course Food Creator course ====
This course is designed for students wishing to continue their studies in the catering field. The course itself is divided into two options, one specializing in restaurant cuisine and the other in pastry-making.

==== Automobile industry course ====
This is the only course taught by the school that is not qualified as a general course. This purely technical course provides students with technical training in electricity, electronics, and AI. The course also prepares students for Takachiho University entrance exams.

== Clubs ==
=== Sports ===
Hiryū High School has a strong focus on sports courses. As a result, the high school has many clubs such as:

- Baseball
- Swimming
- Judo
- Kendo
- Boxing
- Wrestling
- Volleyball
- Associative football
- Table tennis
- Tennis
- Fencing

==== Sumo ====
The high school sumo team is currently led by a young woman, Hina Takei. The younger sister of professional sumo wrestler Atamifuji, she is also the first female captain to lead a high school sumo team that has been in existence for more than 50 years. The Hiryū sumo club is also highly ranked in team competitions, winning multiple tournaments, lastly the 2022 National Junior High School Tournament championship. Hiryū High School was also the first school to produce a high school-yokozuna in the Reiwa era.

==== Basketball ====
The school is well known for its men's basketball club. Yusaku Harada, a former professional coach who worked in the USA, is credited with helping the basketball club gain momentum. Between 2010 and 2023, the club won the national championships six times and the Winter Cup three times. The team also regularly ranks in the top 8 in national high school competitions.

==== Baseball ====
The baseball club is managed by Yuichi Katsuyoshi, a veteran coach recruited from Kato Gakuen High School, where he coached the team when it won the Shizuoka Prefecture high school ekiden championship three years running.

=== Cultural activities ===
- Auto mechanics
- Patisserie
- Horticulture
- Music bands
- Models
- Illustration and drawing
- Japanese arts
- Press
- Go/Shogi
- Drama
- Science

==== e-Sports ====
Surprisingly, the club also has an e-sports club. This club, born in 2021, aims to establish Japan on the e-Sport scene. However, between 2021 and 2022, the number of club members dropped from 30 students to just 7 because of the study rules and steady practice. Club members have also had to impose their choice on their parents because of the negative perception that this type of teaching has.

==== Taiko ====
The school has a renowned taiko club, which won the prestigious Excellence Award at the 42nd National High School Comprehensive Culture Festival (2018 Shinshu So-bun Festival). The club is reputed to be one of the best in the country, with over 120 concerts a year. The club's performance is also credited with revitalizing Numazu's summer festivals and port attractions.

== Alumni ==
=== Sumo ===
- Sagatsukasa Hiroyuki
- Tochihiryū Yukiya
- Midorifuji Kazunari
- Atamifuji Sakutarō
- Daiseizan Daisuke

=== Baseball ===
- Kento Sugiyama
- Naoki Sugiyama
- Akihito Hiyane
- Minoru Omori
- Sato Ren

=== Association football ===
- Keiji Watanabe
- Ryuji Sawakami
- Soneda Morimasa

=== Basketball ===
- Junpei Takahara
- Shin Aoshima
- Shinnosuke Oishi
- Kosuke Taneichi

=== Other ===
- Ryuji Hara (minimumweight professional boxer)
- Tentaro Kimura (bantamweight professional boxer)
- Rentaro Kimura (bantamweight professional boxer)
- Hiroshi Yamaguchi (former professional boxer)
- Yūji Watanabe (former professional boxer)
- Ulka Sasaki (mixed martial artist)
- Ken'ichi Serizawa (former mixed martial artist)
- Tomohiro Matsunaga (freestyle wrestler
- Masahiro Ōmura (judoka)
- Yoshihiro Murakami (modern pentathlete)
- Yayoi Matsumoto (swimmer)
- Iyono Takateru (bicycle racer)

== Related matters ==
=== Baseball club scandals ===
The school has faced multiple scandals of violence between students. In May 2020, the baseball team manager and two vice-principals of the school were removed from the baseball coaching team for making inappropriate comments and physically punishing students. The violence scandal didn't stop there, however, as during the same period an embezzlement scandal involved the same club, with a teacher being found guilty of embezzling 15 million yen in club funds collected from the baseball team members and was dismissed on disciplinary grounds as of February 2.
