= All Rebellion =

Professional wrestling stable

- Current logo of the stable (2024–present)

Stable
- Members: See below
- Debut: May 7, 2024
- Years active: 2024–present

All Rebellion (オール・レベリオン, Oru Reberion) is a Japanese professional wrestling stable based in the Pro Wrestling Noah (Noah) promotion. It is currently led by Kaito Kiyomiya and also consists of Alejandro and Harutoki.

== History ==
=== Formation. Under Kiyomiya and Kenoh's leadership (2024–2025) ===
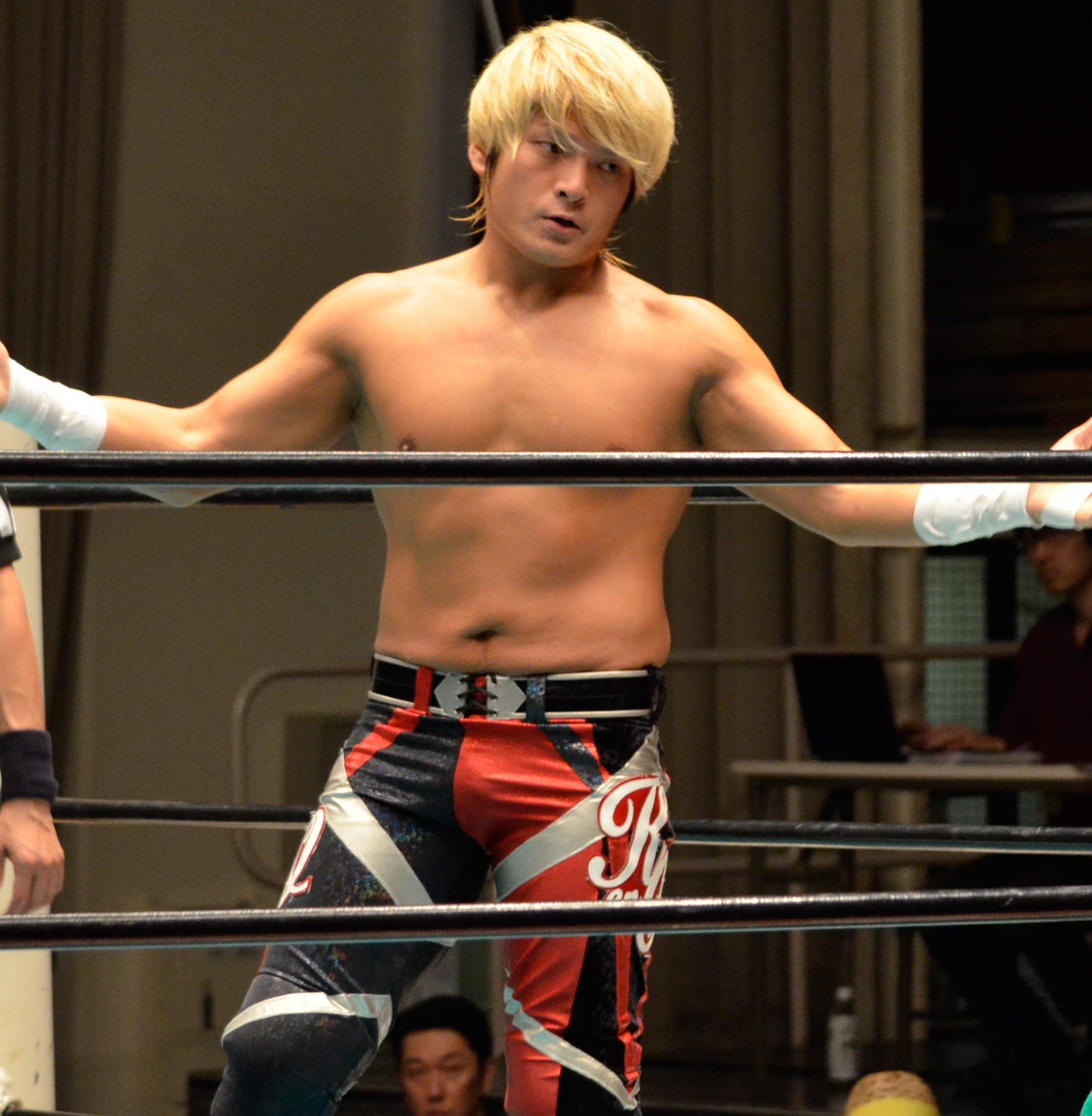
One of the first co-leaders of the unit, Kenoh.

On the first night of the 2024 All Together interpromotional event from May 6, Kaito Kiyomiya teamed up with Shota Umino and Yuki Ueno to defeat Yuya Uemura, Konosuke Takeshita, and Shun Skywalker in six-man tag team competition as the result of the main event. After the bout concluded, Gabe Kidd and Drilla Moloney of the War Dogs attacked Kiyomiya as Kidd demanded a title shot for the latter's GHC Heavyweight Championship. In order to combat the potential higher numerous threat of the Bullet Club's sub-group, Kiyomiya publicly declared one day later on May 7, 2024, the formation of the "All Rebellion" unit alongside Kenoh, Alejandro and Cristobal, a masked wrestler. Ten days later on the second night of the 2024 All Together event from June 15, Kenoh, Alejandro and Kaito Kiyomiya fell short to Yo-Hey and War Dogs' David Finlay and Gabe Kidd. One night later at Noah Grand Ship In Yokohama on June 16, Kiyomiya successfully defended the GHC Heavyweight Championship against Kidd, while Kenoh, Alejandro and Cristobal fought Good Looking Guys (Jake Lee, Yo-Hey and Tadasuke) but came out unsuccessful.

At Noah Destination 2024 on July 13, Alejandro and Cristobal defeated Ninja Mack and Junta Miyawaki, and Hajime Ohara and Super Crazy in three-way tag team competition, and Kaito Kiyomiya successfully defended the GHC Heavyweight title against Yoichi. Kiyomiya won the 2024 edition of the N-1 Victory from the posture of the heavyweight champion by defeating stablemate Kenoh. At Noah Star Navigation in Tokyo 2024 on September 14, Alejandro, Cristobal and Kenoh fell short to Masa Kitamiya, Naomichi Marufuji and Takashi Sugiura, and Kaito Kiyomiya defeated Ryohei Oiwa in singles competition. At Noah Star Navigation Premium: Akitoshi Saito Road Last on October 14, 2024, Kenoh and Alejandro unsuccessfully challenged Naomichi Marufuji and Takashi Sugiura for the GHC Tag Team Championship, and Kaito Kiyomiya successfully defended the GHC Heavyweight title against Masa Kitamiya. During the event, Taishi Ozawa was presented as a new member of the unit after his foreign excursion ended.

At Monday Magic Autumn Vol. 2 on October 28, 2024, Alejandro and Cristobal fought in a Mask vs. Mask match from which Alejandro emerged victorious. After the bout concluded, Cristobal revealed himself as Menso-re Oyaji, explaining that Cristobal was only a played character and that he will be leaving the stable.

At Noah Deathnity on November 17, 2024, Alejandro, Kai Fujimura and Kenoh fell short to Team Noah (Atsushi Kotoge, Go Shiozaki and Hajime Ohara), and Kaito Kiyomiya successfully defended the GHC Heavyweight title against Takashi Sugiura. After the main event concluded, Taishi Ozawa attacked Kiyomiya, betraying the stable and joining the villainous unit of Team 2000X, demanding a Heavyweight title match from Kiyomiya. At Noah The New Year 2025 on January 1, Alejandro and Kai Fujimura unsuccessfully challenged Ratel's (Hayata and Yo-Hey) for the GHC Junior Heavyweight Tag Team Championship in a match which also involved Amakusa and Junta Miyawaki, and Kaito Kiyomiya dropped the GHC Heavyweight title to Taishi Ozawa. Their feud with Team 2000 X, continued during January's Star Navigation tour, on January 11, Kenoh faced OZAWA in a no contest, after Kenoh was attacked by Yoshitatsu. Despite their superiority in numbers, Kenoh challenged Team 2000 X to a six-on-four handicap match, which All Rebellion lost. Following the match, in a post-match interview, after Kiyomiya was attacked by Team 2000 X, El Hijo de Dr. Wagner Jr. and Galeno del Mal, came to the rescue, with Galeno attacking and challenging Ozawa for the GHC Heavyweight Championship, before Wagner, who was leaving NOAH, requested Kiyomiya to team with his brother Galeno, leading him to be accepted into All Rebellion.

=== Under Kiyomiya's sole leadership (2025–present) ===
On the second night of the Star Navigation Premium from February 11, 2025, Galeno unsuccessfully challenged Ozawa for the GHC Heavyweight Championship, while one match prior, Kenoh and Kenta defeated Kaito Kiyomiya and Shuhei Taniguchi in tag team competition. After the bout concluded, Kenoh announced that he was parting ways with the stable, leaving Kiyomiya as the sole leader.

== Members ==
All Rebellion
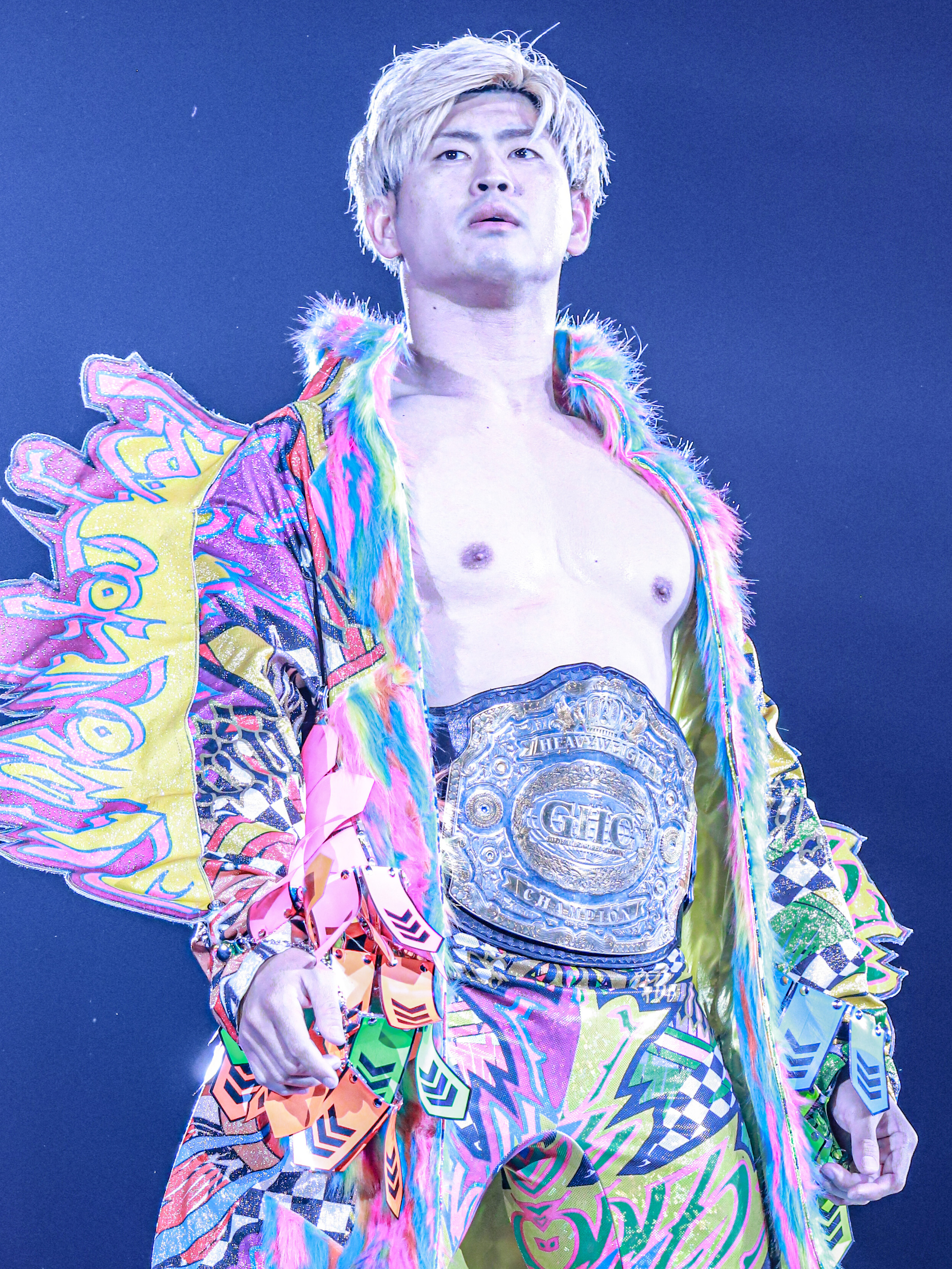
Kaito Kiyomiya (I)

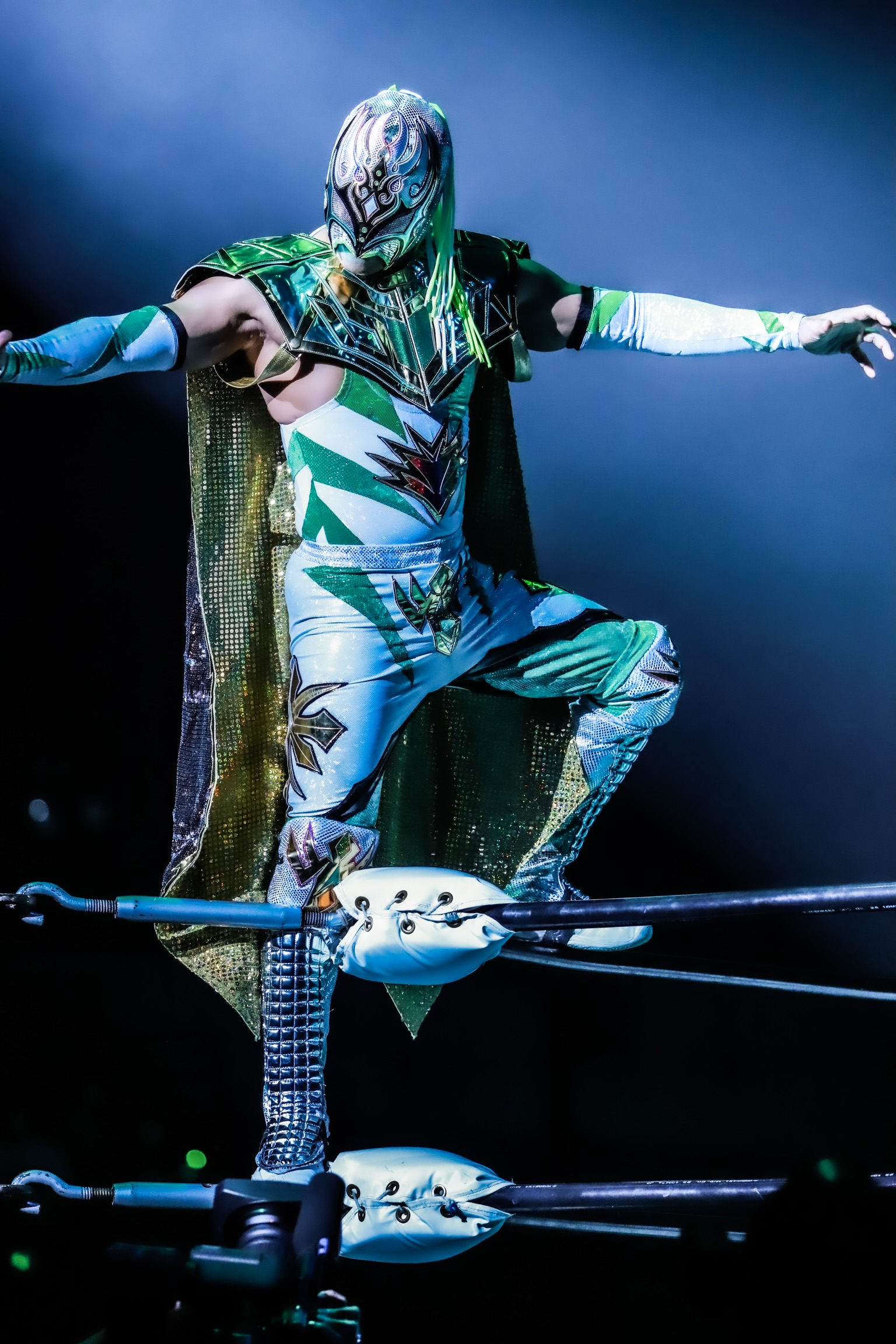
Alejandro

*	Founding member
I	Leader(s)

=== Current ===
Member		Joined
Kaito Kiyomiya	*I	May 7, 2024
Alejandro	*	May 7, 2024
Harutoki		November 30, 2024

=== Former ===
Member		Joined	Left
Cristobal	*	May 7, 2024	October 28, 2024
Taishi Ozawa		October 14, 2024	November 17, 2024
Kenoh	*I	May 7, 2024	February 11, 2025
Kai Fujimura		October 20, 2024	January 11, 2026
Galeno		January 11, 2025	March 8, 2026

== Championships and accomplishments ==
- Pro Wrestling Noah
  - GHC Heavyweight Championship (1 time) – Kiyomiya
  - GHC National Championship (1 time) – Galeno
  - GHC Junior Heavyweight Tag Team Championship (1 time, current) – Alejandro with Dragon Bane
  - N-1 Victory (2024) – Kiyomiya
- Pro Wrestling Illustrated
  - Ranked Kenoh No. 35 of the top 500 singles wrestlers in the PWI 500 of 2024
  - Ranked Kiyomiya No. 47 of the top 500 singles wrestlers in the PWI 500 of 2024
  - Ranked Galeno No. 143 of the top 500 singles wrestlers in the PWI 500 of 2025
- Tokyo Sports
  - Fighting Spirit Award (2024) – Kiyomiya

== Luchas de Apuestas record ==
Winner (mask)	Loser (mask)	Location	Event	Date	Notes
Alejandro	Cristobal	Tokyo, Japan	Noah Monday Magic Autumn Vol. 2	October 28, 2024	
