= Yu Owada =

Japanese professional wrestler

Owadasan
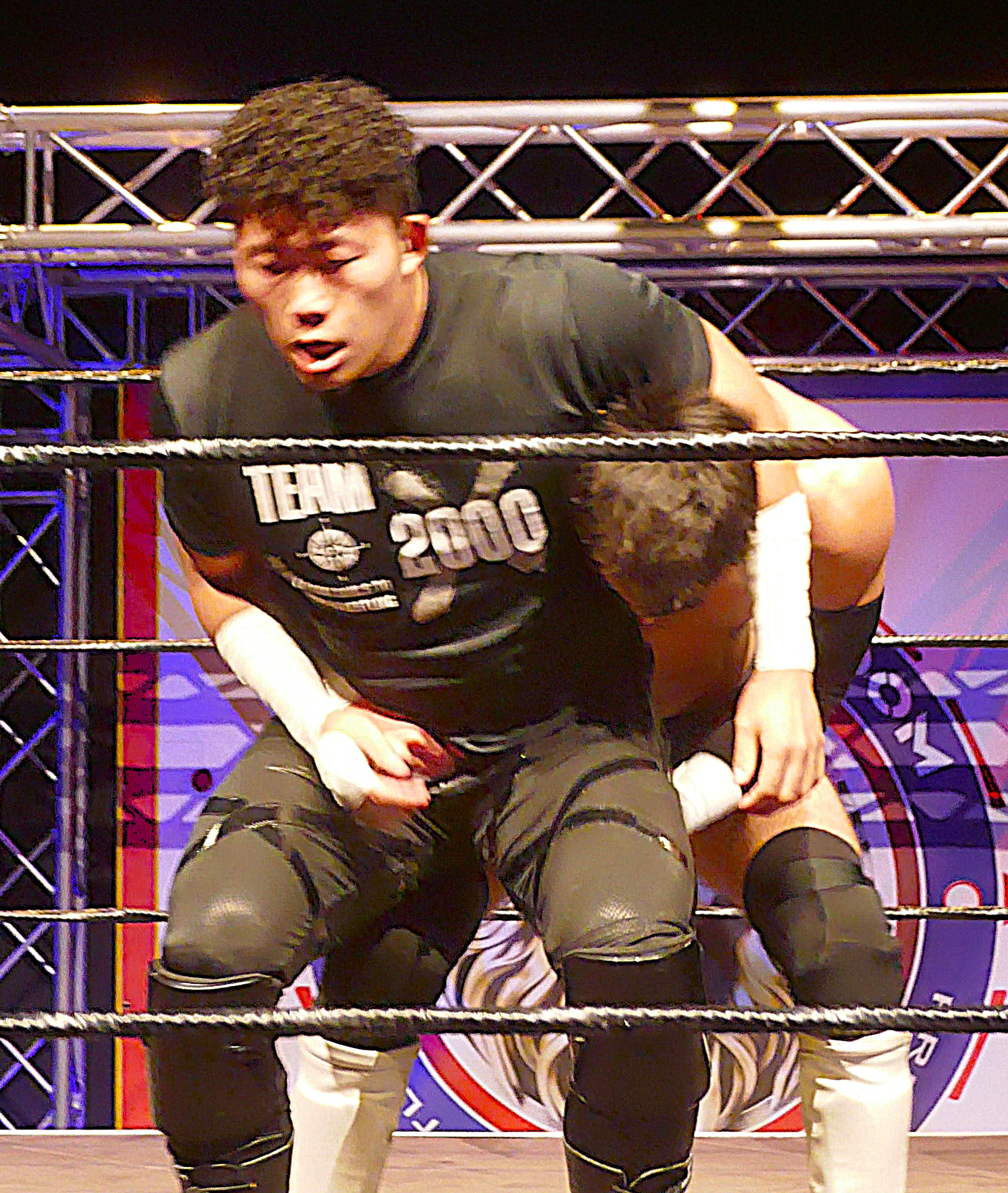
- Owadasan in September 2025

Personal information
- Born: 12 August 2000 (age 26) Sapporo, Japan

Professional wrestling career
- Ring name: Yu Owada Owadasan Kouga
- Billed height: 178 cm (5 ft 10 in)
- Billed weight: 85 kg (187 lb)
- Trained by: Animal Hamaguchi; Kaito Kiyomiya
- Debut: 2023

Yu Owada (大和田侑, Ōwada Yū) better known by his ring name Owadasan (オオワダサン, Ōwadasan) is a Japanese professional wrestler. He is signed to Pro Wrestling Noah where he performs under his real name and is part of the Team 2000X stable. He also performs on the European independent circuit under the ring name Kouga.

== Professional wrestling career ==
=== Pro Wrestling Noah (2023–present) ===
Owada made his professional wrestling debut at NOAH One Night Dream on July 15, 2023, where he fell short to Kai Fujimura in singles competition.

He made his debut in a pay-per-view at Noah Grand Ship In Nagoya 2023 on September 24, where he teamed up with Hi69, Daiki Inaba and Muhammad Yone in a losing effort against Taishi Ozawa, Stallion Rogers, Atsushi Kotoge and Akitoshi Saito. At Noah Demolition Stage in Fukuoka 2023 on October 28, Owada teamed up with Muhammad Yone and Taishi Ozawa in a losing effort against Kai Fujimura, Stallion Rogers and Akitoshi Saito. At Noah The New Year 2024, he defeated Taishi Ozawa in singles competition. At Noah Cross Over in Sendai 2024 on February 4, he teamed up with Yoshinari Ogawa in a losing effort against Kaito Kiyomiya and Ryohei Oiwa. At Noah Wrestle Magic on May 4, 2024, he teamed up with Junta Miyawaki and Hitoshi Kumano in a losing effort against Hayata, Eita and Akira in six-man tag team competition. At Noah The New Year 2025, Owada took part in the traditional Noah The Rumble match won by LJ Cleary.

Owada competed in various of the promotion's signature events. In the Global Junior Heavyweight League, he made his first appearance at the 2024 edition of the tournament where he fell short to Yuto Kikuchi in the first rounds. In the Global Tag League, Owada made his first appearance at the 2024 edition where he teamed up with Kenoh and scoring a total of five points overall.

==== Foreign excursion (2025-2026) ====
Owada started his foreign excursion in the British independent circuit. He made his foreign debut at Progress Chapter 183: Hundred Volts, an event promoted by Progress Wrestling on August 25, 2025, where he fell short to Charlie Sterling. At Progress Chapter 184: Camden Lock Up on September 28, 2025, he fell short to Ricky Knight Jr. At Progress Chapter 189: In Darkest Night on January 25, 2026, Kouga and Gene Munny challenged Diamond Eyes (Connor Mills and Nico Angelo) for the Progress Tag Team Championship but were unsuccessful after interference from their manager Session Moth Martina. On February 7, 2026, in Berlin, Germany he defeated Ahura to win the GWF Berlin Championship, his first title of his career. He wrestled his final match of his excursion at Progress Chapter 197: Wrestling Over Everything on August 31, 2026, defeating Mark Coffey.

==== Return to Noah (2026-present) ====
On August 10, 2026, it was announced by Noah that Owada (as Kouga) would be participating in the 2026 edition of the N-1 Victory tournament. During a press conference on September 11, he said his status as a member of Team2000X will be decided with his match against Ozawa.

=== Japanese independent scene (2023–present) ===
At the 2024 edition of All Together, Owada teamed up with Hayata and Ulka Sasaki in a losing effort against TMDK (Zack Sabre Jr. and Ichiban Sweet Boys (Robbie Eagles and Kosei Fujita)).

== Championships and accomplishments ==
- German Wrestling Federation
  - GWF Berlin Championship (1 time)
  - World Cup (2026)
- Pro Wrestling Illustrated
  - Ranked No. 445 of the top singles wrestlers in the PWI 500 in 2026
