= Romeo Moreno =

Spanish professional wrestler (born 2002)

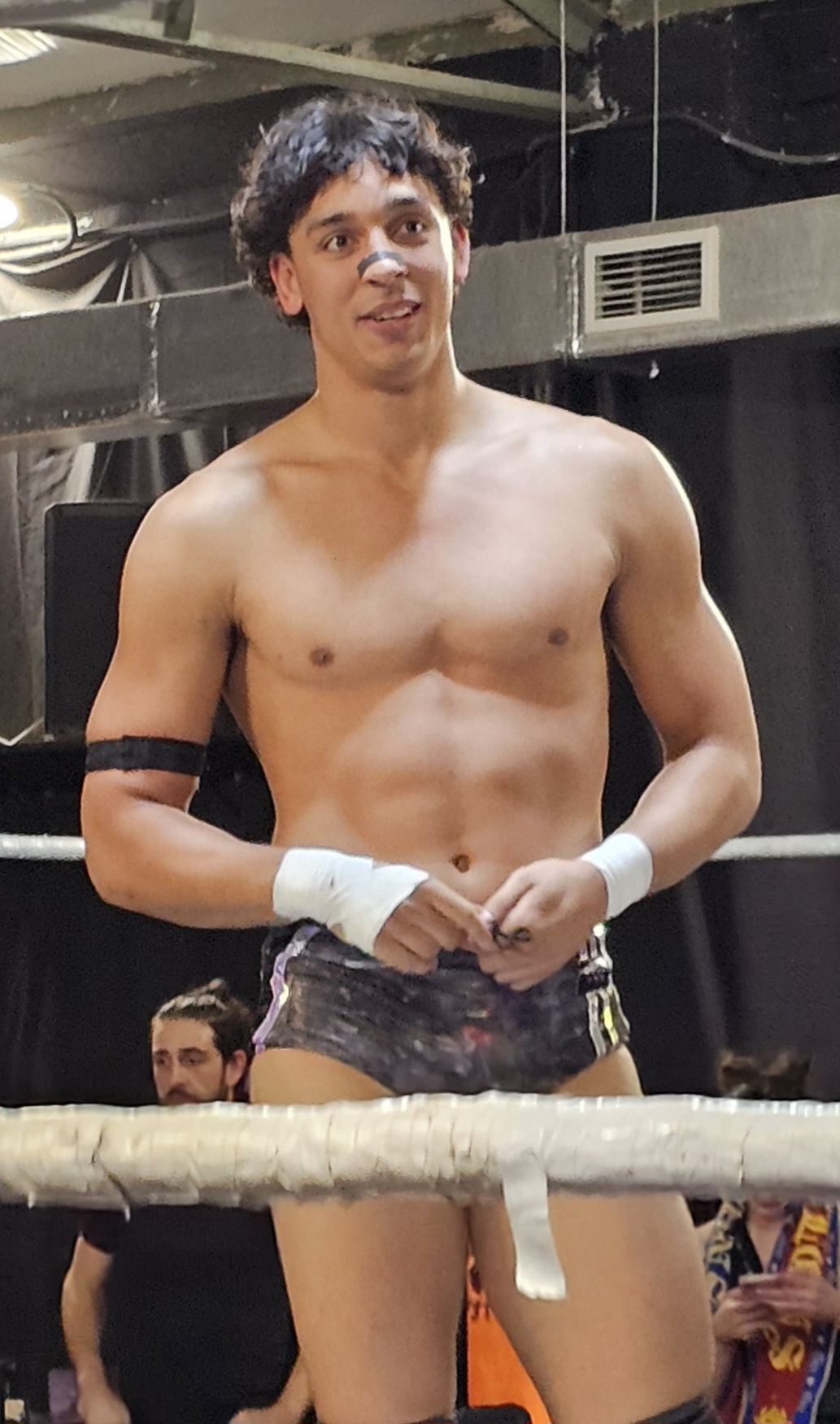

Personal information
- Born: Jaime Zozaya-García; July 11, 2002 (age 24) Madrid, Spain

Professional wrestling career
- Ring name(s): Romeo Moreno; Zozaya
- Billed height: 6 ft 3 in (1.91 m)
- Billed weight: 176 lb (80 kg)
- Billed from: Madrid, Spain
- Trained by: White Wolf Wrestling
- Debut: October 6, 2018

Jaime Zozaya-García (born July 11, 2002) is a Spanish professional wrestler signed to WWE, where he performs on the NXT brand under the ring name Romeo Moreno. Prior to signing with WWE, he competed internationally under the ring name Zozaya, wrestling for promotions including PROGRESS Wrestling, Revolution Pro Wrestling (RevPro), Pro Wrestling Noah and Consejo Mundial de Lucha Libre (CMLL).

== Early life ==
Zozaya-García was born in Madrid, Spain.

== Professional wrestling career ==
=== Independent circuit (2018–2025) ===
Zozaya made his professional wrestling debut on October 6, 2018.

He became one of the most prominent wrestlers on the Spanish independent wrestling scene and gained international recognition through appearances in the United Kingdom, Mexico and Japan. During this period, he wrestled for promotions including PROGRESS Wrestling, Revolution Pro Wrestling, Pro Wrestling Noah and Consejo Mundial de Lucha Libre.

Zozaya gained recognition through his work in the United Kingdom with Revolution Pro Wrestling (RevPro). On December 21, 2024, he defeated Leon Slater in a sudden-death Iron Man match at Uprising 2024. During his time with the promotion, he also competed in RevPro's number one contender tournaments. Following his final match for the promotion against Zack Sabre Jr. at the RevPro 13th Anniversary Show event in August 2025, the locker room gave him a standing ovation as a sendoff before his reported move to WWE. Sabre later praised Zozaya, stating that he would be "shocked" if he was not "on top of the industry very, very soon".

Zozaya also competed for PROGRESS Wrestling, including appearances in the 2025 Super Strong Style 16 tournament where he would defeat Kid Lykos II in the first round before subsequently being defeated by Leon Slater in the second round.

Internationally, Zozaya wrestled in Japan for Pro Wrestling Noah, appearing at events including The New Year 2025 and Star Navigation Premium 2025.

=== WWE (2025–present) ===
In October 2025, WWE officially announced Zozaya as part of a new European recruiting class reporting to the WWE Performance Center. He made his WWE in-ring debut at an NXT live event on November 8, teaming with Cyril Coquerelle against Brooks Jensen and Lexis King in a losing effort. Following several appearances under variations of his real name, he was given the ring name Romeo Moreno in February 2026. As Moreno, he worked in the Evolve brand. In May, he began teaming with Noam Dar in NXT, defeating Hank & Tank (Hank Walker and Tank Ledger) to win 2026 Dusty Rhodes Tag Team Classic on the November 4 episode of NXT. For winning the tournament, they received a NXT Tag Team Championship match on the following week but were ruled out of the title match due to (kayfabe) injury after a backstage attack by The Vanity Project (Jackson Drake, Myka Lockwood, and NXT Tag Team Champions Brad Baylor and Ricky Smokes).

== Championships and accomplishments ==
- Fight Factory Pro Wrestling
  - Irish Junior Heavyweight Championship (1 time)
- Lucha Libre Barcelona
  - LLB Tag Team Championship (2 times) - with Javier Vives (1) and Rizo (1)
- Lucha Libre Rebelión
  - Copa Niño Anónimo
- Pro Wrestling Illustrated
  - Ranked No. 157 of the top 500 singles wrestlers in the PWI 500 in 2025
- Revolution Championship Wrestling
  - RCW Championship (1 time)
- White Wolf Wrestling
  - Triple W Absolute Championship (2 times)
- WWE
  - Dusty Rhodes Tag Team Classic (2026) – with Noam Dar
