= GHC National Championship =

Professional wrestling championship

- Current championship design

Details
- Promotion: CyberFight
- Brand: Pro Wrestling Noah
- Date established: October 3, 2019
- Current champion: Luis Mante
- Date won: October 25, 2026
Statistics
- First champion: Takashi Sugiura
- Most reigns: Takashi Sugiura, Kenoh and Manabu Soya (2 reigns)
- Longest reign: Hijo de Dr. Wagner Jr. (352 days)
- Shortest reign: Ozawa (<1 day)
- Oldest champion: Masakatsu Funaki (52 years, 315 days)
- Youngest champion: Galeno (23 years, 234 days)
- Heaviest champion: Galeno (129 kg (284 lb))
- Lightest champion: Hayata (75 kg (165 lb))

The Global Honored Crown (GHC) National Championship (Japanese: GHCナショナル王座, Hepburn: GHC Nashonaru Ōza) is a professional wrestling championship in the Japanese promotion Pro Wrestling Noah. It was created on October 3, 2019 and inaugurated on November 2 when Takashi Sugiura defeated Michael Elgin. The title is defended exclusively in Japan. Rather than being another "heavyweight" championship, Noah classifies the title as an openweight title, with both heavyweight and junior heavyweight wrestlers being eligible to challenge for it.

== History ==
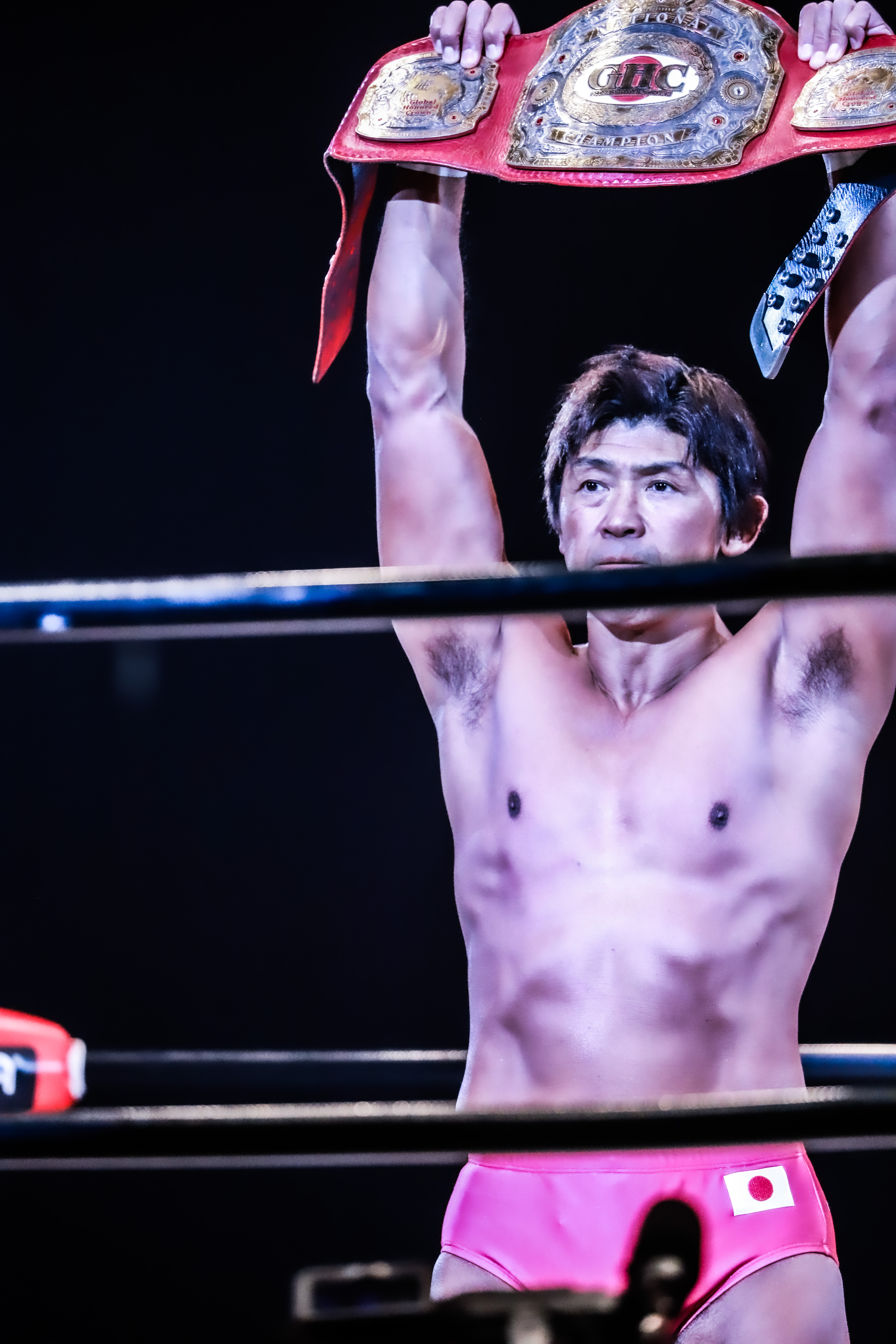
Sixth champion Masakatsu Funaki holding the title belt

In January 2019, LIDET Entertainment took over the ownership of Noah, and on October 3, Riki Choshu announced on behalf of LIDET Entertainment, the creation of the GHC National Championship, with the inaugural champion to be crowned on November 2, 2019, at Noah the Best 2019, in a match between Michael Elgin and Takashi Sugiura. It was later announced that the title would be an openweight title, with both heavyweight and junior heavyweight wrestlers being eligible to challenge for it. The title was scheduled to be defended exclusively in Japan and was part of a plan by LIDET Entertainment to attract a new audience. On November 2, 2019, Sugiura defeated Elgin to become the inaugural GHC National Champion, before losing the title to Katsuhiko Nakajima on May 9, 2020.

== Reigns ==
As of 19 July 2026, there have been a total of twenty-one reigns shared between eighteen different champions. Takashi Sugiura was the first champion. He is also tied with Kenoh and Manabu Soya for the most reigns with two, and has the longest combined reign at 371 days. Hijo de Dr. Wagner Jr.'s sole reign is the longest at 352 days, while Masaaki Mochizuki's reign is the shortest at 16 days. Jack Morris is the youngest champion at the age of 30 years old, while Masakatsu Funaki was the oldest, winning the title at 52 years old. The current champion is Luis Mante who is in his first reign.

Key
No.	Overall reign number
Reign	Reign number for the specific champion
Days	Number of days held
Defenses	Number of successful defenses
+	Current reign is changing daily

No.	Champion	Championship change			Reign statistics			Notes	Ref.
No.	Champion	Date	Event	Location	Reign	Days	Defenses	Notes	Ref.
1	Takashi Sugiura	November 2, 2019	Noah The Best 2019	Tokyo, Japan	1	189	4	Defeated Michael Elgin to win the inaugural title.	
2	Katsuhiko Nakajima	May 9, 2020	GHC National Championship: Sugiura vs. Nakajima	Kawasaki, Japan	1	87	2	Officially held at the "Noah Special Arena", situated in an undisclosed location.	
3	Kenoh	August 4, 2020	Noah Departure 2020 — Night 1	Tokyo, Japan	1	229	6		
4	Kazuyuki Fujita	March 21, 2021	Noah The Infinity 2021	Tokyo, Japan	1	39	0		
5	Takashi Sugiura	April 29, 2021	Noah The Glory 2021	Nagoya, Japan	2	182	2		
6	Masaaki Mochizuki	October 28, 2021	Go On The Demolition Stage 2021	Kumamoto, Japan	1	16	0		
7	Kenoh	November 13, 2021	Demolition Stage 2021 in Yokohama	Yokohama, Japan	2	70	3		
8	Masakatsu Funaki	January 22, 2022	Higher Ground 2022	Osaka, Japan	1	292	6		
9	Hijo de Dr. Wagner Jr.	November 10, 2022	Global Honored Crown 2022	Tokyo, Japan	1	352	6		
10	Jack Morris	October 28, 2023	Demolition Stage In Fukuoka	Fukuoka, Japan	1	166	3		
11	Hayata	April 11, 2024	Star Navigation 2024	Tokyo, Japan	1	93	0		
12	Ulka Sasaki	July 13, 2024	Noah Destination 2024	Tokyo, Japan	1	63	0		
13	Manabu Soya	September 14, 2024	Star Navigation in Tokyo 2024	Tokyo, Japan	1	119	4		
14	Tetsuya Endo	January 11, 2025	Star Navigation Premium 2025	Tokyo, Japan	1	31	0		
15	Manabu Soya	February 11, 2025	Star Navigation Premium 2025 (Night 2)	Tokyo, Japan	2	19	0		
16	Ozawa	March 2, 2025	Memorial Voyage in Yokohama	Tokyo, Japan	1	<1	0	This was a Winner takes all Lumberjack Deathmatch also disputed for Ozawa's GHC Heavyweight Championship.	
—	Vacated	March 2, 2025	Memorial Voyage in Yokohama	Tokyo, Japan	—	—	—	Ozawa relinquished the title right after the bout concluded.	
17	Galeno	April 11, 2025	Sunny Voyage 2025	Niigata, Japan	1	188	4	Defeated Tetsuya Endo to win the vacant title.	
18	Dragon Bane	October 16, 2025	Star Navigation 2025	Tokyo, Japan	1	77	0		
19	Alpha Wolf	January 1, 2026	The New Year 2026	Tokyo, Japan	1	124	1		
20	Naomichi Marufuji	May 5, 2026	Legacy Rise 2026	Tokyo, Japan	1	173	4		
21	Luis Mante	October 25, 2026	Wrestle Odyssey	Tokyo, Japan	1	17+	0		

== Combined reigns ==
As of November 11, 2026.

†	Indicates the current champion

Rank	Wrestler	No. of reigns	Combined defenses	Combined days
1	Takashi Sugiura	2	6	371
2	Hijo de Dr. Wagner Jr.	1	6	352
3	Kenoh	2	9	299
4	Masakatsu Funaki	1	6	292
5	Galeno	1	4	188
6	Naomichi Marufuji	1	4	173
7	Jack Morris	1	3	166
8	Manabu Soya	2	4	138
9	Alpha Wolf	1	1	124
10	Hayata	1	0	93
11	Katsuhiko Nakajima	1	2	87
12	Dragon Bane	1	0	77
13	Ulka Sasaki	1	0	63
14	Kazuyuki Fujita	1	0	39
15	Tetsuya Endo	1	0	31
16	Luis Mante †	1	0	17+
17	Masaaki Mochizuki	1	0	16
18	Ozawa	1	0	<1

== See also ==
- GHC Heavyweight Championship
- GHC Junior Heavyweight Championship
- GHC Tag Team Championship
- GHC Junior Heavyweight Tag Team Championship
- GHC Hardcore Championship
