= Ozawa (wrestler) =

Japanese professional wrestler

Taishi Ozawa
Personal information
- Born: 23 October 1996 (age 29) Shizuoka, Japan

Professional wrestling career
- Ring name: Taishi Ozawa Ozawa
- Billed height: 181 cm (5 ft 11 in)
- Billed weight: 87 kg (192 lb)
- Trained by: Kaito Kiyomiya
- Debut: 2022

Taishi Ozawa (小澤大嗣, Ozawa Taishi), better known by the ring name Ozawa (stylized in all caps), is a Japanese professional wrestler. He is signed to Pro Wrestling Noah, where he is the second and current leader of Team 2000X and the incumbent winner of the N-1 Victory tournament.

== Professional wrestling career ==
=== Pro Wrestling Noah (2022–present) ===
==== Early career (2022–2024) ====
Taishi Ozawa made his professional wrestling debut in Pro Wrestling Noah as a rookie trainee on the first night of the Star Nagivation 2022 from September 15, where he lost to Yoshiki Inamura in singles competition. Ozawa made his pay-per-view debut at Noah Ariake Triumph 2022 on October 30, where he fell short to Kai Fujimura. During his rookie years, he competed in opener bouts of pay-per-views, mainly against other rookies and in multiple-competitor matches. At Noah Global Honored Crown 2022 on November 10, he teamed up with Yasutaka Yano in a losing effort to Kai Fujimura and Yoshiki Inamura in tag team competition.

At Noah The New Year 2023 on January 1, he fell short to Yasutaka Yano in singles competition. On the first night of the Noah Star Navigation 2023 from February 5, Ozawa teamed up with Kinya Okada in a losing effort against Kongo (Tadasuke and Hi69). At Noah Great Voyage in Osaka 2023 on February 12, he teamed up with Kinya Okada in a losing effort against Funky Express (Muhammad Yone and Akitoshi Saito). At Noah Great Voyage in Yokohama 2023 on March 19, he fell short to Yasutaka Yano. One month later at Noah Green Journey in Sendai 2023 on April 16, he fell short to Anthony Greene. At Noah Majestic 2023 on May 4, he teamed up with Akitoshi Saito in a losing effort against Super Crazy and Mohammed Yone in tag team competition. At Noah Great Journey in Nagoya 2023 on, Ozawa teamed up with Yone and Alejandro in a losing effort against Akitoshi Seiki Yoshioka and Stallion Rogers in six-man tag team competition. At Noah Grand Ship In Nagoya 2023 on September 24, he teamed up with Stallion Rogers, Atsushi Kotoge and Akitoshi Saito to defeat Yu Owada, Hi69, Daiki Inaba and Muhammad Yone as a result of an eight-man tag team bout, which represented his first pay-per-view victory. At Noah Demolition Stage In Fukuoka 2023 on October 28, he teamed up with Yone and Ozawa in a losing effort against Kai Fujimura, Stallion Rogers and Akitoshi Saito.

At Noah The New Year 2024 on January 1, Ozawa fell short to Yu Owada in singles competition beforing embarking on his learning excursion in Europe.

==== Team 2000X (2024–present) ====
Ozawa returned to Japan on October 14, 2024, at Noah Star Navigation Premium: Akitoshi Saito Road Last, being announced as a new member of "All Rebellion". One month later at Noah Deathnity on November 17, 2024, Ozawa attacked stablemate Kaito Kiyomiya after the latter's successful defense of the GHC Heavyweight Championship in the main event against Takashi Sugiura, betraying All Rebellion and joining villainous stable of "Team 2000X" and later shortend his ring name to Ozawa.

At Noah The New Year 2025, Ozawa defeated Kiyomiya to win the GHC Heavyweight Championship, breaking also Kiyomiya's record at two years and four months to become the fastest wrestler to win the title, after his professional wrestling debut. On February 11, OZAWA making his first successful title defense against Galeno. On March 2 at Memorial Voyage in Yokohama, where OZAWA defeated Manabu Soya in a Winner Takes All Lumberjack Deathmatch to win the GHC National Championship and retain the GHC Heavyweight Championship. Afterwards, Ozawa was challenged by Masa Kitamiya to a title match for the GHC Heavyweight Championship, before relinquishing the GHC National Championship. At Star Navigation Premium, Ozawa defeated Kitamiya. At Noah's 25th Anniversary, Ozawa successfully defended the title against Kenta. On July 19, during Night 1 of Noah New Departure 2025, he lost the GHC Heavyweight Championship to Kenoh via knockout, ending his reign at 199 days.

In September 2025, Ozawa participated in the N-1 Victory tournament but had to withdraw after suffering an ankle injury in his first matchup against Naomichi Marufuji. At Noah's event in Sendai on November 21, 2025, Ozawa requested to be the next challenger for Yoshiki Inamura's GHC Heavyweight Championship, who accepted. At Noah The New Year 2026 on January 1, 2026, Ozawa failed to regain the title from Inamura. At Noah Spring Mayhem on May 2, Ozawa defeated Tetsuya Naito in Naito's first singles match in Japan in over a year.

=== New Japan Pro Wrestling (2023) ===
Ozawa made his debut in New Japan Pro Wrestling as a guest competitor on the second night of Wrestle Kingdom 17 from January 21, where he teamed up with Yasutaka Yano and fell short to Kosei Fujita and Ryohei Oiwa.

=== Progress Wrestling (2024) ===
After spending roughly one and a half years as a rookie in Noah, Ozawa started a foreign excursion in January 2024 in which he has mainly strolled through the British independent scene. Most of his work took place in Progress Wrestling. He made his debut at Chapter 162: The Light Of The Dragon on January 28, 2024, where he fell short to Rob Drake. At Progress Chapter 165: Diamond Dust on March 7, 2024, Ozawa fell short to Connor Mills in singles competition. At Progress Chapter 167: One Bump Or Two? on April 21, 2024, he fell short to Luke Jacobs. During his time in Progress, Ozawa developed heel character tendencies while helping other villainous wrestlers such as Gene Munny and Luke Jacobs attack opponents post matches. During the 2024 Super Strong Style tournament, Ozawa competed in a Rufus Hound invitational battle royal won by Gene Munny. At Progress Chapter 169: The Devil On My Shoulder on July 28, 2024, he fell short to Saxon Huxley. At Progress Chapter 171: History Is Written By The Victors on September 22, 2024, he teamed up with Gene Munny in a losing effort against Lykos Gym (Kid Lykos and Kid Lykos II). Ozawa wrestled his last match in the excursion pay-per-views at Progress x Noah x DEFY on October 5, 2024, where he fell short to Cara Noir.

== Personal life ==
Ozawa was a member of his high school's gymnastics club and also has a background in breakdancing. He was inspired to become a wrestler from watching Mistico. Outside the ring he is an avid pachinko player and cyclist.

== Championships and accomplishments ==
- Pro Wrestling Illustrated
  - Ranked No. 26 of the top 500 singles wrestlers in the PWI 500 in 2025
- Pro Wrestling Noah
  - GHC Heavyweight Championship (1 time)
  - GHC National Championship (1 time)
  - N-1 Victory (2026)
- Tokyo Sports Puroresu Awards
  - Best Bout Award (2025) vs. Kaito Kiyomiya on January 1
