= Galeno del Mal =

Mexican professional wrestler

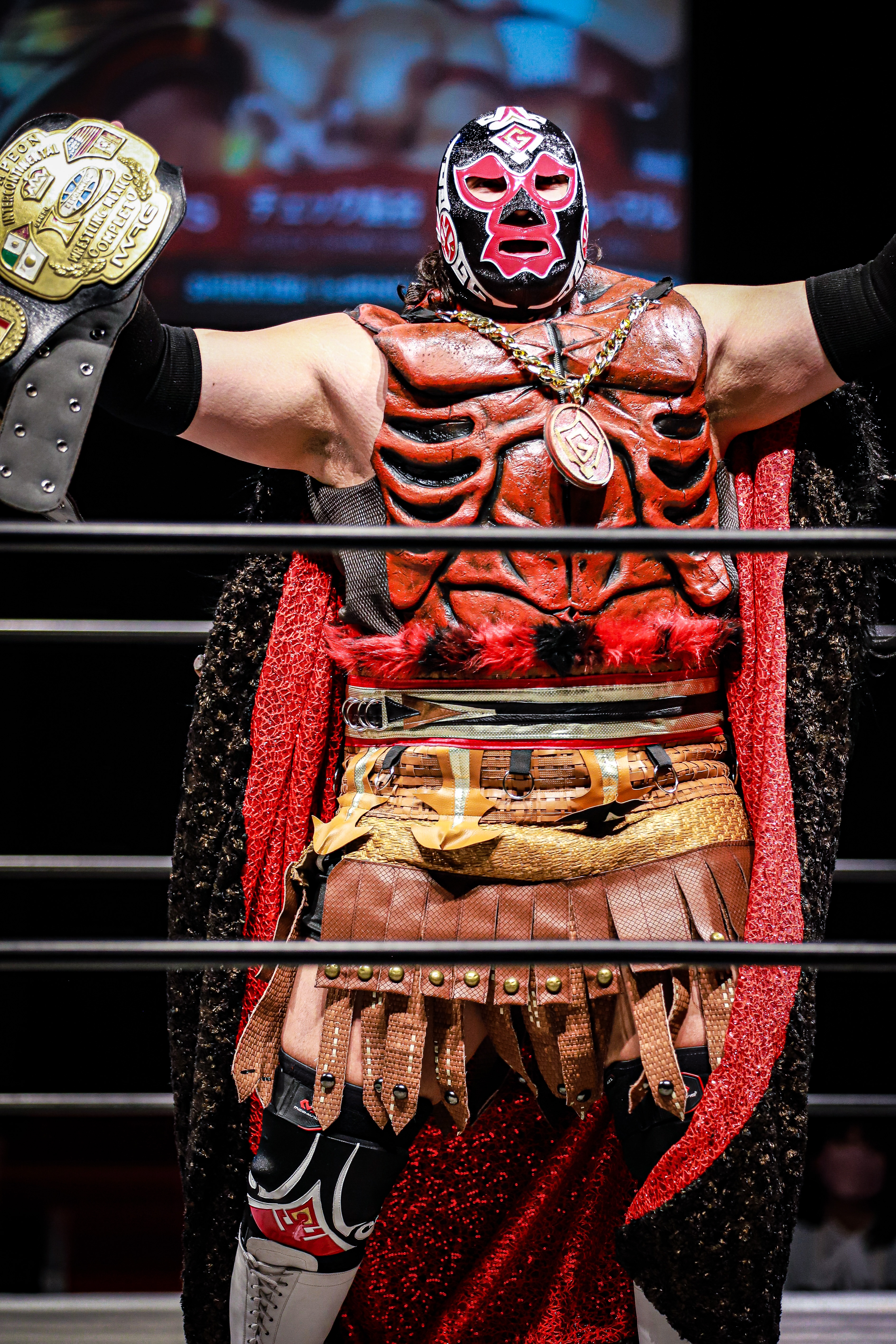
- Galeno del Mal in April 2023

Personal information
- Born: August 20, 2001 (age 25) Mexico City, Mexico
- Relatives: Dr. Wagner Jr. (father); Rossy Moreno (mother); El Hijo de Dr. Wagner Jr. (brother); Alda Moreno (aunt); Esther Moreno (aunt); Cynthia Moreno (aunt); Dr. Wagner (grandfather); Alfonso Moreno (grandfather); Silver King (uncle); Oriental (uncle); Mini Cibernético (uncle); Groon XXX (uncle); Extassis (uncle); Syrus (cousin)

Professional wrestling career
- Ring name(s): Galeno del Mal; Galeno
- Billed height: 1.90 m (6 ft 3 in)
- Billed weight: 129 kg (284 lb)
- Trained by: Último Guerrero; Bandido; Diva Salvaje
- Debut: December 25, 2018

Galeno del Mal (born August 20, 2001), known mononymously by the ring name Galeno, is a Mexican professional wrestler, currently working promotions Lucha Libre AAA Worldwide (AAA) and WWE. As of September 2026, he is one-half of the AAA World Tag Team Champions alongside his brother El Hijo de Dr. Wagner Jr.. He is best known for his tenure in the Japanese Pro Wrestling Noah, where he is a former one time GHC National Champion and a former member of All Rebellion.

== Personal life ==
Galeno del Mal is part of the Wagner wrestling family and Moreno wrestling family. He is the son of Dr. Wagner Jr. and Rossy Moreno. His ring name translates to Evil Doctor, which was also a nickname used by his father and his grandfather Dr. Wagner. His real name is not a matter of official record as he is an ''enmascarado'', which by ''lucha libre'' traditions means that his personal life is kept secret from the general public.

He finished high school on the advice of his parents, but they both supported his decision to go into professional wrestling.

== Professional wrestling career ==
=== Independent career (2018–present) ===
Galeno del Mal made his debut under that name at 17 years old on Christmas Day 2018 in Arena Azteca Budokan, a smaller arena in Ciudad Nezahualcóyotl, wrestling alongside his brother El Hijo de Dr. Wagner Jr. and uncle Extassis. At a vastly bigger stature and physique compared to most luchadors, and through his family connection, he received a lot of attention almost immediately. He made his debut for International Wrestling Revolution Group or IWRG in January 2019. During the first half of 2019 he would also work for Kaoz Lucha Libre in Monterrey, Generación XXI in the Guanajuato/Querétaro-area, and several spot shows for Lucha Libre AAA Worldwide, also known as Triple A.

He continued to wrestle high-profile matches on the Mexico City independent scene throughout 2020 and 2021. In 2022 he would start working for Big Lucha, a promotion run by Bandido.

At IWRG Caravana De Campeones, August 27, 2022, Galeno defeated Oficial AK-47 to become the new IWRG Intercontinental Heavyweight Champion, and also became the youngest heavyweight champion to date.

On November 11, at the Big Lucha Face 2 Face event, he would make the save after Jack Evans and his henchmen attacked Bandido, Komander and Gravity, turning face in the process. Afterwards he would join Bandidos newly announced stable, Los Golden Guns, alongside Bandido, Komander, Gravity and Rey Horus.

After making his United States debut at a Big Lucha/Galli show in Chicago, on January 21, 2023 he was announced for Gleat in Japan. He made his debut at the G Prowrestling Ver. 43 event on February 12 in Osaka. Together with Kazma Sakamoto and Quiet Storm, Galeno's team defeated Cima, T-Hawk and El Lindaman.

During the 2023 WrestleCon in Los Angeles, Galeno would team with Rey Horus and Aramis to defeat the team of Arez, Laredo Kid and Látigo at the Mark Hitchcock Memorial Supershow at the Globe Theatre March 30.

On June 3, 2023, Galeno made his debut at Seattle based promotion DEFY Wrestling's PPV event, DEFY Your Nightmare, where he defeated Delta Jr.

Galeno and Wagner also won The Crash Tag Team Championship, which they relinquished in November 2025 to depart for Lucha Libre AAA Worldwide.

=== Pro Wrestling Noah (2024–2026) ===
On July 13, 2024, at Destination, Galeno made his debut in Pro Wrestling Noah, teaming with his brother El Hijo de Dr. Wagner Jr. in a winning effort against Los Golpeadores (Alpha Wolf and Dragón Bane). On November 17 at Deathnity, in a post-match interview, Galeno and Wagner confronted Naomichi Marufuji and Takashi Sugiura challenging them to a title match for the GHC Tag Team Championship. On November 30, Galeno and Wagner were defeated by Marufuji and Sugiura, failing to win the titles.

On January 11, 2025, Galeno and Wagner saved Kaito Kiyomiya from an attack by Team 2000 X, with Galeno attacking and challenging OZAWA for the GHC Heavyweight Championship, before Wagner, who was leaving NOAH, requested Kiyomiya to team with his brother Galeno, leading him to be accepted in to All Rebellion. On February 11, Galeno unsuccessfully challenged OZAWA for the GHC Heavyweight Championship. On April 11, he defeated Tetsuya Endo in a tournament final to win the vacant GHC National Championship.

Galeno would perform his final wrestling match for Pro Wrestling Noah at Noah Apex Conquest 2026 on 8 March 2026, facing and losing to his All Rebellion stabelmate Kaito Kiyomiya.

=== Lucha Libre AAA (2025–present) ===
Galeno signed with Lucha Libre AAA Worldwide and WWE in November 2025. He made his televised debut for AAA on the 2 May 2026 episode, saving his brother El Hijo de Dr. Wagner Jr. from Omos. He defeated Chris Carter and Drago in a handicap match on the 16 May episode of AAA.

== Championships and accomplishments ==
- International Wrestling Revolution Group
  - IWRG Intercontinental Heavyweight Championship (1 time)
- Lucha Libre AAA Worldwide
  - AAA World Tag Team Championship (1 time, current) – with El Hijo de Dr. Wagner Jr.
- Mas Luchas
  - Torneo Supremo 2025
- PCW Ultra
  - PCW ULTRA Heavyweight Championship (1 time, final)
- Pro Wrestling Illustrated
  - Ranked No. 219 of the top 500 singles wrestlers in the PWI 500 in 2026
- Pro Wrestling Noah
  - GHC National Championship (1 time)
  - GHC National Title Tournament (2025)
- Texas Wrestling Cartel
  - TWC Tag Team Championship (1 time, current) – with El Hijo de Dr. Wagner Jr.
- The Crash Lucha Libre
  - The Crash Tag Team Championship (1 time) – with El Hijo de Dr. Wagner Jr.
