= Ulka Sasaki =

Japanese mixed martial arts fighter

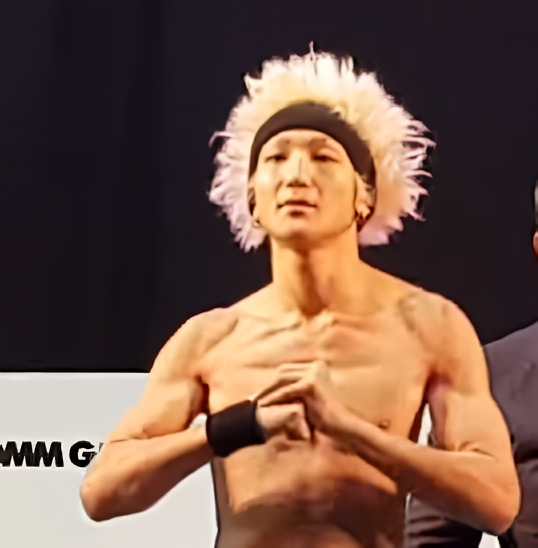
- Sasaki in 2018

Personal information
- Native name: 佐々木憂流迦
- Born: Yūta Sasaki; October 7, 1989 (age 37) Numazu, Shizuoka, Japan
- Height: 5 ft 10 in (1.78 m)
- Weight: 145 lb (66 kg; 10.4 st)
- Professional wrestling career
- Ring name: Ulka Sasaki
- Billed height: 1.80 m (5 ft 11 in)
- Billed weight: 90 kg (200 lb)
- Billed from: Izunokuni, Shizuoka
- Debut: January 2, 2024

Sport
- Martial arts career
- Division: Featherweight; Bantamweight; Flyweight
- Reach: 71 in (180 cm)
- Style: Wrestling, BJJ, Shootfighting
- Fighting out of: Garden City, New York, USA
- Team: Serra-Longo Fight Team
- Years active: 2010–2024

Mixed martial arts record
- Total: 36
- Wins: 24
- By knockout: 2
- By submission: 12
- By decision: 10
- Losses: 10
- By knockout: 2
- By submission: 5
- By decision: 3
- Draws: 2

Other information
- Notable school: Hiryū High School
- Mixed martial arts record from Sherdog

Yuta Sasaki (佐々木 佑太, Sasaki Yūta; born October 7, 1989), known professionally as Ulka Sasaki (佐々木憂流迦, Sasaki Uruka), is a Japanese professional wrestler and former mixed martial artist. He is signed to Pro Wrestling Noah. He also appears in WWE, in their development territory NXT.

A professional competitor since 2010, Sasaki formerly competed for Ultimate Fighting Championship, Shooto, Deep, and Vale Tudo Japan. He is the former Shooto Pacific Rim (132 lbs) Champion.

== Background ==
Born and raised in Shizuoka, Sasaki was a talented wrestler and also began training in Brazilian jiu-jitsu from a young age. He wrestled for three seasons at Hiryū High School, finishing in the top 16 at the All-Japan High School Greco-Roman Wrestling Championships, and in 2009 Sasaki won the All-Japan Combat Wrestling Open Championships for the under 66 kg division. That same year, he also finished second at the All-Japan Amateur Shooto Championships. Later in 2013, Sasaki won the ADCC Japan Trial for the under 66 kg division.

== Mixed martial arts career ==
=== Shooto ===
Sasaki started his professional career in 2010. He fought mainly for Shooto, but also fought for Deep and GCM early in his career. Sasaki faced Yo Saito on December 18, 2010, at Shooto: The Rookie Tournament 2010 Final. He defeated Saito via unanimous decision after two rounds and became the 2010 Shooto 143-pound rookie champion.

Sasaki faced Tetsu Suzuki on January 20, 2013, at Shooto: 1st Round 2013 for the Shooto Pacific Rim 132-pound title. He won via unanimous decision and became the new champion. Sasaki defended his title on July 27, at Shooto: 3rd Round 2013 against Kenji Yamamoto. He won via knockout at 11 seconds in the first round and retained the title. Shortly after the bout, Sasaki relinquished his title in order to be able to fight for Shooto's world title.

Sasaki faced current ZST 132 lb champion Keisuke Fujiwara on January 13, 2014, at Shooto: 1st Round 2014. He won via submission due to a rear-naked choke in the first round.

=== Ultimate Fighting Championship ===
In July 2014, it was announced that Sasaki had signed with the UFC. He made his debut against Roland Delorme at UFC Fight Night 48 on August 23, 2014. Sasaki won via submission in the first round. The win also earned Sasaki his first Performance of the Night bonus award. Sasaki faced Leandro Issa on December 20, 2014, at UFC Fight Night 58. He lost the fight by submission in the second round.

Sasaki faced Taylor Lapilus on June 20, 2015, at UFC Fight Night 69. He lost the fight via TKO in the second round.

Sasaki faced Willie Gates May 8, 2016, at UFC Fight Night 87. He won the fight via submission in the second round. Sasaki was expected to face Matheus Nicolau on November 19, 2016, at UFC Fight Night 100. However, on November 3, Nicolau was pulled from the bout after USADA revealed a potential anti-doping violation from a sample taken October 13.

Sasaki next faced Wilson Reis on February 11, 2017, at UFC 208. He lost the fight by unanimous decision. Sasaki faced Justin Scoggins on June 17, 2017 at UFC Fight Night: Holm vs. Correia. Sasaki suffered almost two rounds of damage but managed to sink his arm around Scoggins' neck and submitted him via a rear-naked choke in the second round to win the fight. This fight won Sasaki his second Performance of the Night bonus award. Sasaki faced Jussier Formiga on September 23, 2017 at UFC Fight Night: Saint Preux vs. Okami. He lost the fight via submission in the first round.

Sasaki was scheduled to face Magomed Bibulatov on April 21, 2018 at UFC Fight Night 128. However, Bibulatov was removed from the card due to back injury, and the bout was cancelled. Sasaki faced Jenel Lausa on June 23, 2018 at UFC Fight Night 132. He won the fight in round two via a rear-naked choke submission. Sasaki faced Alexandre Pantoja on November 17, 2018 at UFC Fight Night 140. He lost the fight via rear-naked choke submission in the first round.

=== Rizin FF ===
Sasaki faced Manel Kape in a 130lbs catchweight bout at Rizin 14 on December 31, 2018. He won the fight by unanimous decision.

Sasaki was then scheduled to face Kai Asakura at Rizin 15 on April 21, 2019. However, Sasaki was forced to withdraw from the bout due to a visceral injury and was replaced by Justin Scoggins. He then faced Shintaro Ishiwatari at Rizin 17 on July 28, 2019. Sasaki lost the fight via second-round submission. The fight with Kai Asakura was then rebooked to take place at Rizin 19 on October 12, 2019. Sasaki lost the fight via first-minute technical knockout due to a broken jaw.

After recovering from two jaw surgeries to repair the damage sustained in his previous fight, Sasaki faced Kenta Takizawa at Rizin 26 on December 31, 2020. He won the fight via unanimous decision.

Sasaki faced Yoshinori Horie at Rizin 30 on September 19, 2021. He lost the bout via unanimous decision.

Sasaki headlined Rizin Trigger 2 on February 23, 2022 against Kleber Koike Erbst. Even after finding initial success with the stand-up in the first round, Sasaki lost the bout in the second round via rear-naked choke. Sasaki was expected to face Yoshiki Nakahara at Rizin 37 on July 31, 2022. He withdrew from the fight on July 26, after he tested positive for COVID-19.

Sasaki faced Boyd Allen at Rizin 42 on May 6, 2023. He won the fight by unanimous decision.

== Professional wrestling career ==
=== Pro Wrestling Noah (2023–present) ===
On October 23, 2023, Sasaki himself made an announcement that he would be participating in an exhibition match for Pro Wrestling Noah's November 13 episode of Monday Magic. In a statement made during the October 23 show, he specified that it had been a long-held aspiration of his to perform in Noah, as he had been a devoted fan of the promotion since childhood. He then conveyed on social media that he would "throw all of [his] soul" to enable him to compete in professional wrestling.

He officially made his professional wrestling debut at Noah The New Year 2024 event on January 2, 2024, but was defeated by Takashi Sugiura.

On September 13, 2024, at Destination 2024, he defeated Hayata via referee stoppage to win the GHC National Championship, claiming his first wrestling title. His victory, achieved just six months after his debut, set a record for the fastest title win in the history of the championship. On October 14, 2024, it was announced that Sasaki would face WWE's Shinsuke Nakamura at Noah The New Year 2025 on January 1, 2025. He would go on to lose the match.

Sasaki continue in tag team and multi-man matches. On May 3, he teamed with Kenoh to defeat Jack Morris and Daga of Team 2000X for the GHC Tag Team Championship at Noah's 25th Anniversary event, with Sasaki forcing Morris to submit via a sleeper hold. The pair successfully defended the championship against Manabu Soya and Saxon Huxley on May 31, before losing the titles to Soya and Daiki Inaba on June 3, ending their reign at 31 days. In September, Sasaki participated in the N-1 Victory tournament, competing in Block A against Kazuyuki Fujita, Tetsuya Endo, Kaito Kiyomiya, KENTA, Masa Kitamiya, Daga and Soya. He defeated Kitamiya by disqualification on September 13 and Daga on September 20, but failed to advance to the tournament's final.Sasaki continued competing in Noah's tag team division through the remainder of 2025, teaming with wrestlers including Kenta, HAYATA and Endo.

On January 1, 2026 at The New Year, Sasaki joined the newly formed White Raven Squad led by Kenta. That same month, Sasaki announced he will began an excursion to the United States, which was later revealed to be WWE. On October 25 at Noah Wrestle Odyssey 2026, it was announced that Sasaki would be returning to Pro Wrestling Noah on December 31.

=== WWE (2026) ===
In January 2026, Sasaki announced he will begin an excursion to the United States, which was later revealed to be WWE. Sasaki wrestled in a dark match against Channing "Stacks" Lorenzo before the February 24 episode of NXT. During his excursion, Saskai primarily appeared on the Evolve brand.

== Professional wrestling career and persona ==
His ring name "Ulka" originates from Sanskrit and means "Tengu". He has expressed his fondness for this mythical creature and often wears a long-nosed Tengu mask during his professional wrestling entrances.

In a November 2023 interview, he stated that witnessing the match between Great Muta and Shinsuke Nakamura at Noah The New Year 2023 left a deep impression on him and inspired his decision to pursue a career in professional wrestling.

== Championships and accomplishments ==
=== Mixed martial arts ===
- Shooto
  - Shooto Pacific Rim 132 lb title (One time)
    - One successful title defense
  - Shooto rookie 143 lb champion (2010)
- Ultimate Fighting Championship
  - Performance of the Night (Two times) Roland Delorme and Justin Scoggins

=== Grappling ===
- ADCC Asia & Oceania Champion
  - 2013 ADCC Asia trials (gold) (66 kg)

=== Professional wrestling ===
- Pro Wrestling Illustrated
  - Ranked No. 270 of the top 500 singles wrestlers in the PWI 500 in 2024
- Pro Wrestling Noah

- GHC National Championship (1 time)
- GHC Tag Team Championship (1 time) – with Kenoh

== Mixed martial arts record ==
Professional record breakdown
36 matches	24 wins	10 losses
By knockout	2	2
By submission	12	5
By decision	10	3
Draws	2	

Res.	Record	Opponent	Method	Event	Date	Round	Time	Location	Notes
Win	24–10–2	Boyd Allen	Decision (unanimous)	Rizin 42	May 6, 2023	3	5:00	Tokyo, Japan	
Loss	23–10–2	Kleber Koike Erbst	Submission (rear-naked choke)	Rizin Trigger 2	February 23, 2022	2	3:22	Fukuroi, Japan	
Loss	23–9–2	Yoshinori Horie	Decision (unanimous)	Rizin 30	September 19, 2021	3	5:00	Saitama, Japan	Return to Featherweight.
Win	23–8–2	Kenta Takizawa	Decision (unanimous)	Rizin 26	December 31, 2020	3	5:00	Saitama, Japan	
Loss	22–8–2	Kai Asakura	TKO (broken jaw)	Rizin 19	October 12, 2019	1	0:54	Osaka, Japan	
Loss	22–7–2	Shintaro Ishiwatari	Submission (north-south choke)	Rizin 17	July 28, 2019	2	8:58	Saitama, Japan	Return to Bantamweight.
Win	22–6–2	Manel Kape	Decision (unanimous)	Rizin 14	December 31, 2018	3	5:00	Saitama, Japan	Catchweight (130lbs)
Loss	21–6–2	Alexandre Pantoja	Submission (rear-naked choke)	UFC Fight Night: Magny vs. Ponzinibbio	November 17, 2018	1	2:18	Buenos Aires, Argentina	
Win	21–5–2	Jenel Lausa	Submission (rear-naked choke)	UFC Fight Night: Cowboy vs. Edwards	June 23, 2018	2	4:04	Kallang, Singapore	
Loss	20–5–2	Jussier Formiga	Submission (rear-naked choke)	UFC Fight Night: Saint Preux vs. Okami	September 23, 2017	1	4:30	Saitama, Japan	
Win	20–4–2	Justin Scoggins	Submission (rear-naked choke)	UFC Fight Night: Holm vs. Correia	June 17, 2017	2	3:19	Kallang, Singapore	Performance of the Night.
Loss	19–4–2	Wilson Reis	Decision (unanimous)	UFC 208	February 11, 2017	3	5:00	Brooklyn, New York, United States	
Win	19–3–2	Willie Gates	Submission (rear-naked choke)	UFC Fight Night: Overeem vs. Arlovski	May 8, 2016	2	2:30	Rotterdam, Netherlands	Flyweight debut.
Loss	18–3–2	Taylor Lapilus	TKO (punches)	UFC Fight Night: Jedrzejczyk vs. Penne	June 20, 2015	2	1:26	Berlin, Germany	
Loss	18–2–2	Leandro Issa	Submission (neck crank)	UFC Fight Night: Machida vs. Dollaway	December 20, 2014	2	4:13	Barueri, Brazil	
Win	18–1–2	Roland Delorme	Submission (rear-naked choke)	UFC Fight Night: Bisping vs. Le	August 23, 2014	1	1:06	Macau, SAR, China	Performance of the Night.
Win	17–1–2	Hong Jung-Gi	KO (punches)	Deep: Fujisan Festival	May 25, 2014	1	0:38	Fuji, Japan	
Win	16–1–2	Teruto Ishihara	Technical Submission (rear-naked choke)	Vale Tudo Japan 4th	February 23, 2014	2	1:46	Tokyo, Japan	
Win	15–1–2	Keisuke Fujiwara	Submission (rear-naked choke)	Shooto: 1st Round 2014	January 13, 2014	1	4:35	Tokyo, Japan	
Win	14–1–2	Geun Do Park	Submission (rear-naked choke)	Vale Tudo Japan 3rd	October 5, 2013	1	1:36	Ota, Japan	
Win	13–1–2	Kenji Yamamoto	KO (punch)	Shooto: 3rd Round 2013	July 27, 2013	1	0:11	Tokyo, Japan	Defended the Shooto Pacific Rim 132 lbs Championship.
Win	12–1–2	Kota Onojima	Decision (majority)	Shooto: Gig Tokyo 14	April 21, 2013	3	5:00	Tokyo, Japan	Non-title bout.
Win	11–1–2	Tetsu Suzuki	Decision (unanimous)	Shooto: 1st Round 2013	January 20, 2013	3	5:00	Tokyo, Japan	Won the Shooto Pacific Rim 132 lbs Championship.
Draw	10–1–2	Manabu Inoue	Draw (majority)	Shooto: 12th Round	November 11, 2012	3	5:00	Tokyo, Japan	
Win	10–1–1	Teruyuki Matsumoto	Submission (guillotine choke)	Shooto: Gig Tokyo 10	June 30, 2012	1	0:42	Tokyo, Japan	Featherweight bout.
Win	9–1–1	Kazuhiro Ito	Submission (rear-naked choke)	Shooto: Gig Tokyo 9	April 14, 2012	2	3:34	Tokyo, Japan	Bantamweight debut.
Win	8–1–1	Satoshi Watanabe	Decision (unanimous)	Deep: Fujisan Festival	January 29, 2012	2	5:00	Fuji, Japan	
Loss	7–1–1	Guy Delumeau	Decision (unanimous)	Shooto: Shootor's Legacy 4	September 23, 2011	3	5:00	Tokyo, Japan	
Win	7–0–1	Kosuke Kindaichi	Decision (majority)	Shooto: Shootor's Legacy 3	July 18, 2011	2	5:00	Tokyo, Japan	
Win	6–0–1	Yoshifumi Nakamura	Decision (majority)	Shooto: Shootor's Legacy 2	April 1, 2011	2	5:00	Tokyo, Japan	
Draw	5–0–1	Yusuke Kagiyama	Draw	Deep: Shizuoka Impact 2011	February 6, 2011	2	5:00	Shizuoka, Japan	
Win	5–0	Yo Saito	Decision (unanimous)	Shooto: The Rookie Tournament 2010 Final	December 18, 2010	2	5:00	Tokyo, Japan	Won the 2010 Shooto Rookie (143 lbs) Championship.
Win	4–0	Motohiro Takenawa	Decision (unanimous)	Shooto: Kitazawa Shooto Vol. 4	September 17, 2010	2	5:00	Tokyo, Japan	
Win	3–0	Keiji Sakuta	Submission (rear-naked choke)	GCM: Cage Force Preliminary Festival 1	July 25, 2010	3	1:03	Tokyo, Japan	
Win	2–0	Shinji Maeguchi	Submission (rear-naked choke)	Shooto: Gig Central 20	June 13, 2010	2	1:24	Nagoya, Japan	
Win	1–0	Atsushi Masukura	Submission (rear-naked choke)	GCM: Cage Force 16	April 11, 2010	1	0:30	Tokyo, Japan	Featherweight debut.

== See also ==
- List of current Rizin FF fighters
- List of male mixed martial artists
- List of UFC bonus award recipients
