= Kai Fujimura =

Japanese professional wrestler (born 1995)

Personal information
- Born: Kai Fujimura; March 29, 1995 (age 31) Fukuoka, Japan
- Relative: Alejandro (brother)

Professional wrestling career
- Billed height: 1.71 m (5 ft 7 1/2 in)
- Billed weight: 80 kg (180 lb)
- Billed from: Fukuoka, Japan
- Trained by: WRESTLE-1 Dojo; Keiji Muto
- Debut: July 2, 2019

Kai Fujimura (Japanese: 藤村 加偉, Hepburn: Fujimura Kai; born 29 March 1995) is a Japanese professional wrestler. He is signed to Pro Wrestling Noah, where he performs under his real name and is the current GHC Junior Heavyweight Champion in his first reign and a member of Team 2000X.

== Professional wrestling career ==
=== WRESTLE-1 (2019–2020) ===
Kai Fujimura made his professional wrestling debut on 26 December 2019 at WRESTLE-1 Tour 2019 Shining Winter, where he teamed with Ganseki Tanaka, Ryuji Hijikata, and Ryuki Honda in a losing effort against Alejandro, Kaz Hayashi, Koji Doi, and Masayuki Kono. On 31 December, at WRESTLE-1 Wonder Carnival 2019, Fujimura teamed with Takuro Niki and Hajime in a losing effort against So Daimonji, Hiroaki Moriya, and Kyosuke Ikaho.

Fujimura secured his first career victory on 25 January 2020 at WRESTLE-1 Wrestle Soul Vol. 3, where he defeated Takuro Niki. His final match with WRESTLE-1 took place on 15 March 2020 at WRESTLE-1 Wrestle Wars 2020, where he was once again defeated by Takuro Niki.

=== Pro Wrestling Noah (2020–present) ===
Fujimura made his Pro Wrestling Noah debut on 28 November 2020 at NOAH New Hope on Wrestle Universe, where he was defeated by Atsushi Kotoge. On 29 December, at NOAH Sugiura-gun Produce: All Dogs Gather! 2 – Takashi Sugiura 20th Anniversary Show, he earned his first win in the promotion by defeating Yasutaka Yano.

In early 2021, Fujimura experienced a series of losses before defeating Yano once again on 6 March at NOAH Engine Full Throttle! Yokohama Full Throttle. Despite another string of defeats, he secured a win over Yano on 2 May at NOAH The Ovation 2021 – Day 1. On 21 June, at NOAH The Home #4, Fujimura teamed with Atsushi Kotoge to defeat Daisuke Harada and Yano. Two days later, on 23 June at NOAH The Home #6, Fujimura, Kotoge, and Yoshiki Inamura defeated Harada, Junta Miyawaki, and Kaito Kiyomiya.

After a period of losses through late June to September, Fujimura returned to winning form on 24 September at NOAH The Home #13, defeating Yano once more. Later that same night, he teamed with Kinya Okada against Yano and Junta Miyawaki, with the match ending in a draw.

On 10 October, at NOAH Grand Square 2021 in Osaka, Fujimura and Daiki Inaba defeated Okada and Yano. On 23 October, at NOAH The Home #16, Fujimura and Ikuto Hidaka wrestled Atsushi Kotoge and Yano to a draw. On 7 December, at NOAH Man Crash 2021 – Day 1, he teamed with Hajime Ohara, King Tany, Mohammed Yone, and Yano to defeat Aleja, Haoh, Manabu Soya, Nioh, and Tadasuke in a ten-man tag match.

In 2022, Fujimura and Okada defeated Miyawaki and Yano on 5 January at NOAH Reboot 2022. On 7 January, at NOAH N Innovation U-Cup – Day 2, Fujimura wrestled Yano to a time-limit draw. He defeated Yano again on 9 February at NOAH Step Forward 2022 – Day 1. On 20 March, at NOAH Just Fine! 2022 – Day 1, he teamed with his real-life brother Alejandro to defeat Okada and Yano. At NOAH Majestic 2022 on 30 April, Fujimura and Slex defeated Alejandro and Yano.

On 21 May, at NOAH Dream On 2022 – Day 4, he teamed with Inamura to defeat Inaba and Miyawaki. On 12 June, at CyberFight Festival 2022, Fujimura and Okada defeated Toy Kojima and Yuya Koroku. On 5 August, at NOAH Departure 2022, he teamed with Yoshinari Ogawa and Yuya Susumu to defeat Eita, NOSAWA Rongai, and Super Crazy in a six-man tag match.

On 21 September, at NOAH N Innovation 2022 – Day 5, Fujimura defeated Yano, followed by back-to-back victories over Taishi Ozawa on 7 October (NOAH Star Navigation 2022 – Day 7) and again the following week at NOAH Sunny Voyage 2022 – Day 9.

At NOAH/Dragon Gate Global Dream on 11 November, Fujimura, Yano, and Inamura defeated Madoka Kikuta, Mochizuki Jr., and Ryu Fuda in a six-man tag match. On 23 November, at NOAH The Best 2022, Fujimura, Yano, and Ogawa faced Eita, NOSAWA Rongai, and Super Crazy. The match ended in a double count-out, was restarted, and ended the same way before a final restart saw Fujimura’s team win via disqualification.

On 18 December, at NOAH New Hope 2022, Fujimura was defeated by Naomichi Marufuji. He then took a six-month hiatus due to injury.

Fujimura returned on 10 June 2023 at NOAH Sunny Voyage 2023 – Day 16, teaming with Kotoge in a losing effort against LEONA and Ogawa. In the following matches, he scored multiple victories over Yu Owada. On 19 August, at NOAH N-1 Victory 2023 – Day 5, Fujimura and Seiki Yoshioka defeated Ozawa and Owada. On 26 August, at Day 7 of the same tournament, Fujimura and Ozawa defeated Alejandro and Owada.

On 23 September, at NOAH Sunny Voyage 2023 – Day 24, Fujimura and Miyawaki defeated Ozawa and Owada. On 7 October, at NOAH The Home Deluxe, he teamed with Hi69 and Manabu Soya to defeat Atsushi Kotoge, Masa Kitamiya, and Taishi Ozawa. On 20 October, at NOAH Star Navigation 2023 – Day 6, Fujimura and Stallion Rogers defeated Ozawa and Owada.

Fujimura continued his momentum with a singles win over Owada on 22 October at NOAH Sunny Voyage 2023 – Day 26, followed by another tag team win on 27 October with Hajime Ohara against Ozawa and Owada. On 28 October, at Noah Demolition Stage In Fukuoka 2023, Fujimura teamed with Akitoshi Saito and Stallion Rogers to defeat Yone, Ozawa, and Owada.

== Championships and accomplishments ==
- Pro Wrestling Noah
  - GHC Junior Heavyweight Championship (1 time, current)
