= All Together (professional wrestling) =

Professional wrestling events

Logo of the All Together events

All Together is a series of professional wrestling events organized by United Japan Pro-Wrestling. Initially the All Together event series was organized by Japan's three biggest promotions; All Japan Pro Wrestling (AJPW), New Japan Pro-Wrestling (NJPW) and Pro Wrestling Noah (NOAH), in response to the March 2011 Tōhoku earthquake and tsunami. The first event was held in Tokyo on August 27, 2011, and the second in Sendai on February 19, 2012. All proceeds from the events were donated to Japanese Red Cross. The events featured no storylines or championship matches, instead they were booked as "supercards", putting together combinations of wrestlers from the three promotions that fans would normally not see. A third event called All Together: Again took place in Tokyo on June 9, 2023, as a memorial to NJPW founder Antonio Inoki who had died the previous year. A fourth event took place in Tokyo on May 5, 2024, in response to the 2024 Noto earthquake and was also the first event under the United Japan Pro-Wrestling (UJPW) banner, which comprises AJPW, NJPW, DDT Pro Wrestling (DDT), Dragongate (DG), Big Japan Pro-Wrestling (BJW), NOAH and World Wonder Ring Stardom (STARDOM).

== Tokyo ==
All Together
- Promotion(s): All Japan Pro Wrestling; New Japan Pro-Wrestling; Pro Wrestling Noah
- Date: August 27, 2011
- Venue: Nippon Budokan
- Attendance: 17,000

Pay-per-view chronology
| ← Previous (AJPW) 2011 Puroresu Love in Ryōkoku Vol. 12 (NJPW) G1 Climax 2011 (Noah) New Navigation '10 in Osaka | Next → (AJPW/Noah) All Together: Mōikkai, Hitotsu ni Narō ze (NJPW) G1 Climax Special 2011 |

All Together chronology
| ← Previous; First | Next → Sendai |

On April 18, 2011, Yukinobu Ebata, president of the Tokyo Sports magazine, All Japan Pro Wrestling president Keiji Mutoh and top champion Suwama, New Japan Pro-Wrestling president Naoki Sugabayashi and top champion Hiroshi Tanahashi and Pro Wrestling Noah president Akira Taue and top champion Takashi Sugiura held a press conference in Tokyo's Nippon Budokan, announcing that the three promotions would be coming together for a charity event on August 27 at the same arena. All proceeds from the event would be donated to help those affected by the March 11, 2011, Tōhoku earthquake and tsunami. The event marked the first time all three promotions had come together to co-produce an event and the first time since August 1979, when AJPW and NJPW had co-produced an event. The event was sponsored by Tokyo Sports. Rock band Funkist composed a song named "All Together" for the event, which featured thirty wrestlers from the three promotions singing backing vocals. The event aired live on pay-per-view, and was later aired on tape delay on Fighting TV Samurai, Gaora, NTV G+ and TV Asahi.

In addition to AJPW, NJPW and Noah wrestlers, Kota Ibushi from DDT Pro-Wrestling and Kensuke Sasaki, Katsuhiko Nakajima, Kento Miyahara and Satoshi Kajiwara from Kensuke Office also took part in the event. American retired wrestler Dick Beyer, using his famous The Destroyer character, attended the event and presented a trophy to the winner of the Destroyer Cup. Manabu Nakanishi and Satoshi Kojima from NJPW and Naomichi Marufuji and Takeshi Rikio from Noah were forced to miss the event due to injuries. All in all, the event featured ten matches involving 82 wrestlers. The semi-main event, where AJPW wrestler Keiji Mutoh and Noah wrestler Kenta Kobashi defeated the NJPW tag team of Takashi Iizuka and Toru Yano, was later named the 2011 Match of the Year by Tokyo Sports. On October 25, representatives of the three promotions handed a check of ¥58,273,560 (approx. U.S. $730,000 at the time), made up of ticket, PPV and merchandise sales, to Japanese Red Cross.

=== Results ===
| No. | Results | Stipulations | Times |
|---|---|---|---|
| 1 | Bushi, Hiroshi Yamato, Kota Ibushi and Taiji Ishimori defeated Kaz Hayashi, Ricky Marvin, Shuji Kondo and Tiger Mask | Eight-man tag team match | 10:05 |
| 2 | Seiya Sanada, Shuhei Taniguchi and Tetsuya Naito defeated Manabu Soya, Muhammad Yone and Yujiro Takahashi | Six-man tag team match | 11:10 |
| 3 | Akitoshi Saito and Togi Makabe defeated Hirooki Goto and Taiyō Kea | Tag team match | 09:55 |
| 4 | Kai, Katsuhiko Nakajima, Kotaro Suzuki, Prince Devitt and Ryusuke Taguchi defeated Genba Hirayanagi, Kenta, Koji Kanemoto, Minoru and Yoshinobu Kanemaru | Ten-man tag team match | 15:07 |
| 5 | Jyushin Thunder Liger, Masakatsu Funaki and Takuma Sano defeated Atsushi Aoki, Minoru Suzuki and Taichi | Six-man tag team match | 12:47 |
| 6 | Kentaro Shiga won by last eliminating Gedo^{1} | 26-man battle royal for the Destroyer Cup | 11:54 |
| 7 | Akebono, Ryota Hama, Takeshi Morishima and Yutaka Yoshie defeated Hiroyoshi Tenzan, Osamu Nishimura, Wataru Inoue and Yuji Nagata | Eight-man tag team match | 11:20 |
| 8 | Jun Akiyama and Kensuke Sasaki defeated Takao Omori and Yoshihiro Takayama | Tag team match | 15:44 |
| 9 | Keiji Mutoh and Kenta Kobashi defeated Chaos (Takashi Iizuka and Toru Yano) | Tag team match | 14:58 |
| 10 | Go Shiozaki, Hiroshi Tanahashi and Suwama defeated Kenso, Shinsuke Nakamura and Takashi Sugiura | Six-man tag team match | 22:50 |

1. Order of elimination: Hiromu Takahashi, King Fale, Takumi Soya, Black Bushi, Yasufumi Nakanoue, Hideo Saito, Takaaki Watanabe, René Duprée, Akira Taue, Yoshinari Ogawa, Soshun, Lee Jae-kyung, Mazada, Zack Sabre Jr., Satoshi Kajiwara, Tomohiro Ishii, Tomoaki Honma, Kushida, Jun Nishikawa, Joe Doering, Kento Miyahara, Masanobu Fuchi, Super Strong Machine, Masao Inoue, Gedo.

== Sendai ==
All Together: Mōikkai, Hitotsu ni Narō ze
- Promotion(s): All Japan Pro Wrestling; New Japan Pro-Wrestling; Pro Wrestling Noah
- Date: February 19, 2012
- City: Sendai, Miyagi
- Venue: Sendai Sun Plaza Hall
- Attendance: 3,500

Pay-per-view chronology
| ← Previous (AJPW/Noah) All Together (NJPW) The New Beginning | Next → (NJPW) Hataage Kinenbi (Noah) Final Burning in Budokan |

All Together chronology
| ← Previous; Tokyo | Next → Again |

The second All Together show, titled Mōikkai, Hitotsu ni Narō ze ("Once More, Let's Become One"), was announced at the conclusion of the first show. It was held on February 19, 2012, at the Sendai Sun Plaza Hall in Sendai, Miyagi, which was the nearest major city to the epicenter of the March 11, 2011, earthquake and suffered major damage in it and the following tsunami. Much like the first All Together, the second one also aired live on pay-per-view and on tape delay on Fighting TV Samurai, Gaora, NTV G+ and TV Asahi.

The second All Together event featured outside participation from The Great Sasuke, Jinsei Shinzaki, Kenoh and Taro Nohashi from Michinoku Pro Wrestling and Kensuke Sasaki and Katsuhiko Nakajima from Diamond Ring, the recently renamed Kensuke Office. Female wrestler and owner of the Sendai Girls' Pro Wrestling promotion, Meiko Satomura, greeted fans during the intermission. The event featured eight matches and 50 wrestlers. AJPW's Kenso and NJPW's Kazuchika Okada and Prince Devitt missed the event due to schedule conflicts.

=== Results ===
| No. | Results | Stipulations | Times |
|---|---|---|---|
| 1 | The Great Sasuke, Ryusuke Taguchi, Taiji Ishimori and Tiger Mask defeated Gedo, Jado, Kenoh and Taro Nohashi | Eight-man tag team match | 11:12 |
| 2 | Hiroyoshi Tenzan, Kentaro Shiga and Satoshi Kojima defeated Captain All Japan, Captain New Japan and Captain Noah | Six-man tag team match | 10:27 |
| 3 | Katsuhiko Nakajima, Kaz Hayashi, Shuji Kondo and Yoshinobu Kanemaru defeated Jyushin Thunder Liger, Kai, Kotaro Suzuki and Minoru Tanaka | Eight-man tag team match | 14:38 |
| 4 | Takashi Sugiura and Yujiro Takahashi defeated Manabu Soya and Togi Makabe | Tag team match | 11:46 |
| 5 | Akebono, Kensuke Sasaki, Naomichi Marufuji and Yuji Nagata defeated Suzuki-gun (Masayuki Kono, Minoru Suzuki, Taichi and Yoshihiro Takayama) | Eight-man tag team match | 13:58 |
| 6 | Akitoshi Saito, Hirooki Goto and Jinsei Shinzaki defeated Chaos (Shinsuke Nakamura, Takashi Iizuka and Toru Yano) | Six-man tag team match | 13:30 |
| 7 | Keiji Mutoh and Kenta Kobashi defeated Jun Akiyama and Takao Omori | Tag team match | 20:20 |
| 8 | Hiroshi Tanahashi, Suwama and Takeshi Morishima defeated Go Shiozaki, Seiya Sanada and Tetsuya Naito | Six-man tag team match | 23:13 |

== Again ==
All Together: Again
- Promotion(s): All Japan Pro Wrestling; New Japan Pro-Wrestling; Pro Wrestling Noah
- Date: June 9, 2023
- City: Tokyo, Japan
- Venue: Ryogoku Kokugikan

Event chronology
| ← Previous (AJPW) AJPW 51st Anniversary Event (NJPW) Dominion 6.4 in Osaka-jo Hall (NOAH) Sunny Voyage 2023 | Next → (AJPW) Dynamite Series Night 1 (NJPW) NJPW Academy Showcase; AEW x NJPW: Forbidden Door (NOAH) Green Journey 2023 in Nagoya |

All Together chronology
| ← Previous; Sendai | Next → 2024 |

=== Results ===
| No. | Results | Stipulations | Times |
|---|---|---|---|
| 1^{P} | Ryu Inoue, Black Menso-re, Yoh and Ryusuke Taguchi defeated Super Crazy, Alejandro, Seiki Yoshioka and Atsushi Kotoge | Eight-man tag team match | 17:30 |
| 2 | Chaos (Tomohiro Ishii and Bishamon (Hirooki Goto and Yoshi-Hashi)) defeated Masa Kitamiya, Daiki Inaba and Yoshiki Inamura | Six-man tag team match | 8:28 |
| 3 | Chris Ridgeway and Sean Legacy defeated TMDK (Zack Sabre Jr. and Kosei Fujita) | Tag team match | 11:23 |
| 4 | Shota Umino defeated Yoshi Tatsu | Singles match | 5:58 |
| 5 | Axiz (Go Shiozaki and Katsuhiko Nakajima) defeated Satoshi Kojima and Hokuto Omori | Tag team match | 9:12 |
| 6 | Strong Style (Minoru Suzuki, Ren Narita and El Desperado) defeated Naomichi Marufuji, Takashi Sugiura and Junta Miyawaki | Six-man tag team match | 10:08 |
| 7 | United Empire (Jeff Cobb, Great-O-Khan, Aaron Henare and Catch 2/2 (TJP and Francesco Akira)) defeated Saito Brothers (Jun Saito and Rei Saito), Ryuki Honda, Hikaru Sato and Dan Tamura | Ten-man tag team match | 11:41 |
| 8 | Yuji Nagata, Suwama and Yuma Anzai defeated Los Ingobernables de Japon (Tetsuya Naito, Shingo Takagi and Bushi) | Six-man tag team match | 8:31 |
| 9 | Good Looking Guys (Tadasuke, Yo-Hey and Jake Lee) defeated Just 5 Guys (Taka Michinoku, Yoshinobu Kanemaru and Sanada) | Six-man tag team match | 8:34 |
| 10 | Hiromu Takahashi, Atsuki Aoyagi and Amakusa defeated Master Wato, Rising Hayato and Hayata | Six-man tag team match | 8:34 |
| 11 | Kazuchika Okada, Yuma Aoyagi and Kenoh defeated Hiroshi Tanahashi, Kento Miyahara and Kaito Kiyomiya | Six-man tag team match | 23:22 |
P / – the match was broadcast on the pre-show

== 2024 ==
=== Tokyo ===
All Together: United Japan Pro-Wrestling Inauguration – Noto Peninsula Reconstruction Charity Event
- Promotions: United Japan Pro-Wrestling: New Japan Pro-Wrestling; Pro Wrestling Noah; DDT Pro-Wrestling; Dragongate; Big Japan Pro Wrestling; World Wonder Ring Stardom
- Date: May 6, 2024
- City: Tokyo, Japan
- Venue: Nippon Budokan
- Attendance: 4,583

Event chronology
| ← Previous; NJPW; Wrestling Dontaku; NOAH; Wrestle Magic; DDT; DDT Goes Philadelphia; DG; Unlock The Unexpected; BJW; Blow The Night; Stardom; All Star Grand Queendom | Next → NJPW; Resurgence; NOAH; Limit Break 2 DDT; King of DDT: 20th Anniversary (Finals); DG; TBA; BJW; Endless Survivor ~ Beyond The Milestone; Stardom; Flashing Champions |

All Together chronology
| ← Previous; Again | Next → All Together Sapporo |

==== Results ====
| No. | Results | Stipulations | Times |
|---|---|---|---|
| 1 | House of Torture (Evil, Ren Narita, and Yujiro Takahashi) defeated Shacho Squad (Hiroshi Tanahashi, Naomichi Marufuji, and Sanshiro Takagi) | Six-man tag team match | 8:50 |
| 2 | Kenoh defeated Kosei Fujita | Singles match | 9:44 |
| 3 | Mutual Love (Starlight Kid and Natsupoi) defeated 02line (AZM and Miyu Amasaki) | Tag team match | 9:50 |
| 4 | Tomohiro Ishii and Daisuke Sekimoto defeated Jeff Cobb and Masa Kitamiya | Tag team match | 13:15 |
| 5 | El Desperado, Hayata, Kota Minoura, Mao and Ninja Mack defeated Hiromu Takahashi, Los Golpeadores (Alpha Wolf and Dragon Bane), Shunma Katsumata and Yamato | Ten-man tag team match | 13:21 |
| 6 | Taichi and Kai defeated Zack Sabre Jr. and Chris Brookes | Tag team match | 14:59 |
| 7 | Bullet Club War Dogs (David Finlay, Gabe Kidd and Jake Lee) (with Gedo) defeated Los Ingobernables de Japon (Tetsuya Naito, Shingo Takagi and Yota Tsuji) | Six-man tag team match | 17:46 |
| 8 | Shota Umino, Kaito Kiyomiya, and Yuki Ueno defeated Yuya Uemura, Konosuke Takeshita, and Shun Skywalker | Six-man tag team match | 23:18 |

=== Sapporo ===
All Together in Sapporo: Noto Peninsula Reconstruction Charity Event
- Promotions: United Japan Pro-Wrestling: All Japan Pro Wrestling; New Japan Pro-Wrestling; Pro Wrestling Noah; DDT Pro-Wrestling; Big Japan Pro Wrestling; World Wonder Ring Stardom
- Date: June 15, 2024
- City: Sapporo, Japan
- Venue: Hokkaido Prefectural Sports Center
- Attendance: 2,156

Event chronology
| ← Previous; NJPW; Dominion 6.9 in Osaka-jo Hall; NOAH; Limit Break 2 DDT; Judgement 2024; Stardom; Flashing Champions | Next → NJPW; New Japan Soul; NOAH; Grand Ship In Yokohama; DDT; Wrestle Peter Pan 2024; Stardom; The Conversion |

All Together chronology
| ← Previous; 2024 | Next → — |

==== Results ====
| No. | Results | Stipulations | Times |
|---|---|---|---|
| 1 | Toru Yano and Tomoaki Honma defeated Andreza Giant Panda and Tomoya | Tag team match | 6:26 |
| 2 | TMDK (Zack Sabre Jr., Robbie Eagles and Kosei Fujita) defeated Hayata, Ulka Sasaki and Yu Owada | Six-man tag team match | 8:37 |
| 3 | Starlight Kid vs. AZM ended in a time-limit draw | Singles match | 15:00 |
| 4 | Bishamon (Hirooki Goto and Yoshi-Hashi) defeated Daichi Hashimoto and Daisuke Sekimoto | Tag team match | 10:24 |
| 5 | Kazusada Higuchi and United Empire (Jeff Cobb and Great-O-Khan) (with Callum Newman) defeated Tetsuya Endo, Oleg Boltin and Ryohei Oiwa | Six-man tag team match | 9:53 |
| 6 | Just 5 Guys (Sanada, Taichi and Yuya Uemura) defeated Hiroshi Tanahashi, Naomichi Marufuji and Kento Miyahara | Six-man tag team match | 13:25 |
| 7 | Masa Kitamiya defeated Tomohiro Ishii | Singles match | 13:42 |
| 8 | Los Ingobernables de Japon (Shingo Takagi, Bushi, Hiromu Takahashi, Titán and Yota Tsuji) defeated Good Looking Guys (Jack Morris, Anthony Greene and LJ Cleary) and Bullet Club War Dogs (Clark Connors and Drilla Moloney) | Ten-man tag team match | 10:30 |
| 9 | Yo-Hey and Bullet Club War Dogs (David Finlay and Gabe Kidd) defeated All Rebellion (Kenoh, Alejandro and Kaito Kiyomiya) | Six-man tag team match | 12:16 |
| 10 | Tetsuya Naito defeated Jake Lee | Singles match | 26:32 |

== See also ==
- Humanitarian response to the 2011 Tōhoku earthquake and tsunami
- World Wrestling Peace Festival
