= Noah Demolition Stage in Fukuoka 2023 =

2023 Pro Wrestling Noah event

NOAH Demolition Stage in Fukuoka 2023
- Promotional poster featuring various participants
- Promotion: CyberFight
- Brand: Pro Wrestling Noah
- Date: October 28, 2023
- City: Fukuoka, Japan
- Venue: Fukuoka Convention Center
- Attendance: 1,309

Pay-per-view chronology
← Previous; Grand Ship In Nagoya 2023	Next → The New Year 2024

NOAH Demolition Stage in Fukuoka 2023 was a professional wrestling event promoted by CyberFight's sub-brand Pro Wrestling Noah. It took place on October 28, 2023, in Fukuoka, Japan, at the Fukuoka Convention Center. The event will air on CyberAgent's AbemaTV online linear television service and CyberFight's streaming service Wrestle Universe.

Nine matches were contested at the event, including three on the pre-show, and three of Noah's six championships were on the line. The main event saw Kenoh defeat Jake Lee to win the GHC Heavyweight Championship. Other top matches included Jack Morris defeating El Hijo de Dr. Wagner Jr. to win the GHC National Championship, and Los Golpeadores (Dragón Bane and Alpha Wolf) (c) defeating Good Looking Guys (Yo-Hey and Tadasuke) to retain the GHC Junior Heavyweight Tag Team Championship. Also on the show, Katsuhiko Nakajima teamed with Go Shiozaki and lost to Naomichi Marufuji and Takashi Sugiura, making it his last match in Noah.

== Background ==
=== Storylines ===
The event featured nine professional wrestling matches that resulted from scripted storylines, where wrestlers portrayed villains, heroes, or less distinguishable characters in the scripted events that built tension and culminated in a wrestling match or series of matches.

=== Event ===
The event started with three preshow bouts broadcast live on Noah's YouTube channel. In the first one, Kai Fujimura, Stallion Rogers and Akitoshi Saito defeated Muhammad Yone, Daichi Ozawa and Yu Owada in six-man tag team action. In the second one, Shuji Kondo, Seiki Yoshioka, Ninja Mack, Alejandro and Terry Yak picked up a win over Atsushi Kotoge, Hi69, Hajime Ohara, Xtreme Tiger and Junta Miyawaki in ten-man tag team action. In the third one, Kaito Kiyomiya and NJPW's Ryohei Oiwa defeated Anthony Greene and LJ Cleary.

In the first main card match, Hideki Suzuki, Saxon Huxley and Shuhei Taniguchi outmatched the team of Masa Kitamiya, Manabu Soya and Daiki Inaba. Next up, Hayata and Eita went into a double-pinfall draw against Daga and Yoshinari Ogawa. In the sixth bout, Naomichi Marufuji and Takashi Sugiura defeated Katsuhiko Nakajima and Go Shiozaki in Nakajima's last match in Noah. In the seventh bout, Dragon Bane and Alpha Wolf defeated Yo-Hey and Tadasuke to secure the first defense of the GHC Junior Heavyweight Tag Team Championship in that respective reign. In the semi main event, one half of the GHC Tag Team Champions Jack Morris defeated El Hijo de Dr. Wagner Jr. to win the GHC National Championship, ending the champion's reign at 352 days and six successful defenses.

In the main event, Kenoh defeated Jake Lee to win the GHC Heavyweight Championship for the third time in his career, ending the latter's reign at 223 days and four successful defenses. After the bout concluded, Kenoh received a title challenge from Manabu Soya.

== Results ==
No.	Results	Stipulations	Times
1^{P}	Kai Fujimura, Stallion Rogers and Akitoshi Saito defeated Muhammad Yone, Taishi Ozawa and Yu Owada	Six-man tag team match	7:49
2^{P}	Shuji Kondo, Seiki Yoshioka, Ninja Mack, Alejandro and Terry Yaki defeated Atsushi Kotoge, Hi69, Hajime Ohara, Xtreme Tiger and Junta Miyawaki	Ten-man tag team match	10:14
3^{P}	Kaito Kiyomiya and Ryohei Oiwa defeated Good Looking Guys (Anthony Greene and LJ Cleary)	Tag team match	14:05
4	Real (Hideki Suzuki, Saxon Huxley and Shuhei Taniguchi) defeated Masa Kitamiya, Manabu Soya and Daiki Inaba	Six-man tag team match	14:37
5	Hayata and Eita vs. Stinger (Daga and Yoshinari Ogawa) ended in a double pinfall	Tag team match	13:25
6	Naomichi Marufuji and Takashi Sugiura defeated AXIZ (Katsuhiko Nakajima and Go Shiozaki)	Tag team match This was Nakajima's last match in Noah.	22:00
7	Los Golpeadores (Dragón Bane and Alpha Wolf) (c) defeated Good Looking Guys (Yo-Hey and Tadasuke)	Tag team match for the GHC Junior Heavyweight Tag Team Championship	12:39
8	Jack Morris defeated El Hijo de Dr. Wagner Jr. (c)	Singles match for the GHC National Championship	21:11
9	Kenoh defeated Jake Lee (c)	Singles match for the GHC Heavyweight Championship	29:47
(c) / – the champion(s) heading into the match; P / – the match was broadcast on the pre-show
