= Noah Destination 2024 =

2024 Pro Wrestling Noah event

NOAH Destination 2024
- Promotional poster of the event
- Promotion: CyberFight
- Brand: Pro Wrestling Noah
- Date: July 13, 2024
- City: Tokyo, Japan
- Venue: Nippon Budokan
- Attendance: 4,196

Pay-per-view chronology
← Previous; Grand Ship In Yokohama	Next → N-1 Victory 2024

Destination chronology
← Previous; 2022	Next → —

NOAH Destination 2024 was a professional wrestling event promoted by CyberFight's sub-brand Pro Wrestling Noah and took place on July 13, 2024, in Tokyo, Japan, at the Nippon Budokan. Broadcasting was made on CyberAgent's AbemaTV online linear television service and CyberFight's streaming service Wrestle Universe.

Eleven matches were contested at the event, including three on the pre-show, and three of Noah's six championships were on the line. The main event saw Kaito Kiyomiya defeat Yoichi to retain the GHC Heavyweight Championship. In other prominent matches, WWE's AJ Styles defeated Naomichi Marufuji, Amakusa defeated Daga to win the GHC Junior Heavyweight Championship, Ulka Sasaki defeated Hayata to win the GHC National Championship, and Go Shiozaki defeated Akitoshi Saito to win the Zero1 World Heavyweight Championship.

== Background ==
=== Storylines ===
The event featured ten professional wrestling matches that resulted from scripted storylines, where wrestlers portrayed villains, heroes, or less distinguishable characters in the scripted events that built tension and culminated in a wrestling match or series of matches.

During the Grand Ship In Yokohama event from June 16, 2024, Pro Wrestling Noah and WWE announced a joint collaboration via video in which they revealed that AJ Styles was set to face Naomichi Marufuji at Noah Destination 2024.

=== Event ===
The preshow of the event included three bouts. In the first one, Alejandro and Cristobal picked up a victory over the teams of Ninja Mack and Junta Miyawaki, and Hajime Ohara and Super Crazy in three-way tag team competition, and in the second one, Masa Kitamiya, Manabu Soya and Daiki Inaba defeated Takashi Sugiura, Kazuyuki Fujita and Shuhei Taniguchi in six-man tag team action, and in the third one, GHC Junior Heavyweight Tag Team Champions Shuji Kondo and Eita alongside Akira defeated Yoshinari Ogawa, Ryohei Oiwa and Yu Owada in another six-man tag team bout. All the preshow matches were broadcast live on Noah's YouTube channel.

In the first main card bout, Kenoh defeated Yuji Nagata in singles competition. Next up, Jake Lee, Yo-Hey and Tadasuke defeated stablemates Jack Morris, Anthony Greene and LJ Cleary in the dissolution match of the Good Looking Guys unit. After the bout concluded, New Japan Pro Wrestling's Gedo came down the aisle and presented Jake Lee as the newest member of Bullet Club War Dogs. In the sixth bout of the night, Go Shiozaki defeated Akitoshi Saito to win the Zero1 World Heavyweight Championship, ending the latter's reign at 104 days and three successful defenses after previously coming up unsuccessful against him at Noah Limit Break 2, roughly one month prior to the event. After the bout concluded, Saito announced his retirement from professional wrestling. The seventh bout saw Ulka Sasaki defeating Hayata to win the GHC National Championship, ending the latter's reign at 93 days and no successful defenses. After the bout concluded, Hayata was shown backstage accompanied by Yo-Hey and Tadasuke with whom he composed the stable of Ratel's until 2020. Given the fact that Yo-Hey and Tadasuke remained unitless after Good Looking Guys' dissolution the same night, they offered a hand to Hayata which the latter accepted, thus hinting the reunion of their old unit. In the eighth match, Amakusa defeated Daga to win the GHC Junior Heavyweight Championship, ending the latter's reign at 252 days and six successful defenses. Next up, El Hijo de Dr. Wagner Jr. and Galeno del Mal picked up a victory over Dragón Bane and Alpha Wolf in tag team competition.

In the semi main event, WWE's AJ Styles defeated Naomichi Marufuji in singles action.

In the main event, Kaito Kiyomiya defeated Yoichi to secure the second consecutive defense of the GHC Heavyweight Championship in that respective reign.

== Results ==
No.	Results	Stipulations	Times
1^{P}	All Rebellion (Alejandro and Cristobal) defeated Ninja Mack and Junta Miyawaki & Hajime Ohara and Super Crazy	Three-way tag team match	8:48
2^{P}	Masa Kitamiya, Manabu Soya and Daiki Inaba defeated Takashi Sugiura and Real (Kazuyuki Fujita and Shuhei Taniguchi)	Six-man tag team match	9:55
3^{P}	Shuji Kondo, Eita and Akira defeated Yoshinari Ogawa, Ryohei Oiwa and Yu Owada	Six-man tag team match	12:00
4	Kenoh defeated Yuji Nagata	Singles match	12:05
5	Good Looking Guys (Jake Lee, Yo-Hey and Tadasuke) defeated Good Looking Guys (Jack Morris, Anthony Greene and LJ Cleary)	Six-man tag team match This was the Good Looking Guys unit's dissolution match.	13:44
6	Go Shiozaki defeated Akitoshi Saito (c)	Singles match for the Zero1 World Heavyweight Championship	15:00
7	Ulka Sasaki defeated Hayata (c)	Singles match for the GHC National Championship	12:05
8	Amakusa defeated Daga (c)	Singles match for the GHC Junior Heavyweight Championship	16:21
9	La Dinastía Wagner (El Hijo de Dr. Wagner Jr. and Galeno del Mal) defeated Los Golpeadores (Dragón Bane and Alpha Wolf)	Lucha Rules tag team match	13:43
10	AJ Styles defeated Naomichi Marufuji	Singles match	25:27
11	Kaito Kiyomiya (c) defeated Yoichi	Singles match for the GHC Heavyweight Championship	25:31
(c) / – the champion(s) heading into the match; P / – the match was broadcast on the pre-show
