= Noah The New Year 2024 =

2024 Pro Wrestling Noah event

NOAH The New Year 2024
- Promotional poster featuring various participants
- Promotion: CyberFight
- Brand: Pro Wrestling Noah
- Date: January 2, 2024
- City: Tokyo, Japan
- Venue: Ariake Arena
- Attendance: 5,135
- Tagline: "Happy New Year Pro-Wrestling" (プロレス, Puroresu Happī Nyū Iyā)

Pay-per-view chronology
← Previous; Demolition Stage In Fukuoka 2023	Next → Star Navigation 2024 (Night 1)

Noah The New Year chronology
← Previous; 2023	Next → 2025

NOAH The New Year 2024 was a professional wrestling event promoted by CyberFight's sub-brand Pro Wrestling Noah and it took place on January 2, 2024, in Tokyo, Japan, at the Ariake Arena. Broadcasting was on CyberAgent's AbemaTV online linear television service and CyberFight's streaming service Wrestle Universe. It was the first pay-per-view promoted by Noah in 2024.

== Background ==
=== Storylines ===
The event featured thirteen professional wrestling matches that resulted from scripted storylines, where wrestlers portrayed villains, heroes, or less distinguishable characters in the scripted events that built tension and culminated in a wrestling match or series of matches.

=== Event ===
The preshow of the event included two bouts and was broadcast live on Noah's YouTube channel. In the first one, Yu Owada defeated Taishi Ozawa in singles competition, and in the second one, the team of Atsushi Kotoge, Muhammad Yone, Super Crazy and Terry Yaki picked up a win over the team of Akitoshi Saito, Hajime Ohara, Hi69 and Kai Fujimura in eight-man tag team competition.

In the first main event bout, Yo-Hey and Tadasuke defeated the reigning team of champions consisting of Dragón Bane and Alpha Wolf, and Ninja Mack and Alejandro in a three-way tag team match to regain the GHC Junior Heavyweight Tag Team Championship. Next up, Jake Lee and the GHC Tag Team Champions Anthony Greene and Jack Morris who was also the time's GHC National Champion defeated El Hijo del Dr. Wagner Jr., Vinnie Massaro and Titus Alexander in six-man tag team action. In the fifth bout, NJPW's Tomohiro Ishii defeated Masa Kitamiya in singles action. Next up, Go Shiozaki defeated Satoshi Kojima in a Noah vs NJPW bout. After the match concluded, Shiozaki announced the formation of the "Team Noah" unit alongside Atsushi Kotoge, Akitoshi Saito, Muhammad Yone and Hi69. In the seventh bout, Haruka Umesaki and Miyuki Takase defeated Nagisa Nozaki and Great Sakuya in tag team action. Although billed as Keiji Muto's daughter, it was revealed that Sakuya's true identity was the one of Riko Kawahata. In the eighth bout, Takashi Sugiura defeated Ulka Sasaki in singles action. Next up, Zack Sabre Jr. and Yoshinari Ogawa defeated Hiroshi Tanahashi and Hayata in what was dubbed as a Wrestling Symphony tag team match. In the tenth bout, Daga defeated Eita to secure the second consecutive defense of the GHC Junior Heavyweight Championship in that respective reign. In the eleventh bout, Kaito Kiyomiya, Shota Umino, Ryohei Oiwa, Daiki Inaba, Shuji Kondo and Junta Miyawaki defeated House of Torture's Evil, Ren Narita, Yujiro Takahashi, Sho, Yoshinobu Kanemaru and Dick Togo in a Twelve-man tag team elimination match. Kiyomiya won the match by last eliminating Evil. In the semi main event, Kenoh defeated Manabu Soya to secure the first successful defense of the GHC Heavyweight Championship in that respective reign.

In the main event, Kota Ibushi picked up a win over Naomichi Marufuji in singles competition.

== Results ==
No.	Results	Stipulations	Times
1^{P}	Yu Owada defeated Taishi Ozawa	Singles match	5:24
2^{P}	Atsushi Kotoge, Muhammad Yone, Super Crazy and Terry Yaki defeated Akitoshi Saito, Hajime Ohara, Hi69 and Kai Fujimura	Eight-man tag team match	7:22
3	Good Looking Guys (Yo-Hey and Tadasuke) defeated Los Golpeadores (Dragón Bane and Alpha Wolf) (c) and Ninja Mack and Alejandro	Three-way tag team match for the GHC Junior Heavyweight Tag Team Championship	3:36
4	Good Looking Guys (Jake Lee, Jack Morris and Anthony Greene) defeated El Hijo del Dr. Wagner Jr., Vinnie Massaro and Titus Alexander	Six-man tag team match	9:44
5	Tomohiro Ishii defeated Masa Kitamiya	Singles match	15:04
6	Go Shiozaki defeated Satoshi Kojima	Singles match	13:56
7	Luminous (Haruka Umesaki and Miyuki Takase) defeated Nagisa Nozaki and Great Sakuya	Tag team match	13:46
8	Takashi Sugiura defeated Ulka Sasaki	Singles match	11:02
9	Zack Sabre Jr. and Yoshinari Ogawa defeated Hiroshi Tanahashi and Hayata	Wrestling Symphony tag team match	17:36
10	Daga (c) defeated Eita	Singles match for the GHC Junior Heavyweight Championship	13:00
11	Kaito Kiyomiya, Shota Umino, Ryohei Oiwa, Daiki Inaba, Shuji Kondo and Junta Miyawaki defeated House of Torture (Evil, Ren Narita, Yujiro Takahashi, Sho, Yoshinobu Kanemaru and Dick Togo)	Twelve-man tag team elimination match	26:14
12	Kenoh (c) defeated Manabu Soya	Singles match for the GHC Heavyweight Championship	28:36
13	Kota Ibushi defeated Naomichi Marufuji	Singles match	33:26
(c) / – the champion(s) heading into the match; P / – the match was broadcast on the pre-show
