= Noah Grand Ship In Yokohama =

2024 Pro Wrestling Noah event

NOAH Grand Ship In Yokohama
- Promotional poster of the event
- Promotion: CyberFight
- Brand: Pro Wrestling Noah
- Date: June 16, 2024
- City: Yokohama, Japan
- Venue: Yokohama Buntai
- Attendance: 1,815

Pay-per-view chronology
← Previous; Limit Break 2	Next → Destination 2024

NOAH Grand Ship In Yokohama was a professional wrestling event promoted by CyberFight's sub-brand Pro Wrestling Noah and took place on June 16, 2024, in Yokohama, Japan, at the Yokohama Buntai. Broadcasting was made on CyberAgent's AbemaTV online linear television service and CyberFight's streaming service Wrestle Universe.

Ten matches were contested at the event, and three of Noah's six championships were on the line. The main event saw Kaito Kiyomiya defeat Gabe Kidd to retain the GHC Heavyweight Championship. In other prominent matches, Brave (Naomichi Marufuji and Takashi Sugiura) defeated Good Looking Guys (Jack Morris and Anthony Greene) to win the GHC Tag Team Championship, and Daga defeated Starboy Charlie to retain the GHC Junior Heavyweight Championship.

== Background ==
=== Storylines ===
The event featured ten professional wrestling matches that resulted from scripted storylines, where wrestlers portrayed villains, heroes, or less distinguishable characters in the scripted events that built tension and culminated in a wrestling match or series of matches.

=== Event ===
The event started with the three-way confrontation between Super Crazy, Ninja Mack and LJ Cleary solded with the victory of the latter. In the second bout, Pro Wrestling Zero1's stable of "Real Zero1" members Chris Vice, Yoshikazu Yokoyama, Satsuki Nagao, Hide Kubota and Yasu Kubota picked up a victory over Muhammad Yone, Atsushi Kotoge, Akitoshi Saito, Hi69 and Go Shiozaki in ten-man tag team action. The third match saw Shuhei Taniguchi and Titus Alexander outmatching Daiki Inaba and Masa Kitamiya in tag team competition. Next up, Hajime Ohara, Amakusa and Junta Miyawaki defeated GHC Junior Heavyweight Tag Team Champions Shuji Kondo and Eita who teamed up with Yu Owada. In the fifth bout, Takumi Iroha defeated Great Sakuya in singles competition. Next up, Jake Lee, Yo-Hey and Tadasuke defeated Kenoh, Alejandro and Cristobal in six-man tag team action. The seventh bout saw Yoshinari Ogawa and Ulka Sasaki defeating Ryohei Oiwa and Hayata. After the bout ended, Sasaki laid a challenge for the GHC National Championship to Hayata which was set for the very next pay-per-view, the Noah Destination 2024 from July 13. The eighth bout saw Daga defeating Starboy Charlie to secure the sixth consecutive defense of the GHC Junior Heavyweight Championship in that respective reign. After the bout ended, Amakusa stepped up to challenge Daga at Noah Destination 2024. In the semi main event, Naomichi Marufuji and Takashi Sugiura defeated Jack Morris and Anthony Greene to win the GHC Tag Team Championship, ending the latter team's reign at 266 days and eight successful defenses.

In the main event, Kaito Kiyomiya defeated New Japan Pro Wrestling's Gabe Kidd to secure the first defense of the GHC Heavyweight Championship in that respective reign. After the bout concluded, Yoshiki Inamura who returned from his foreign excursion under the ring name of "YOICHI" laid a challenge to Kiyomiya's title which was set for Noah Destination 2024 from July 13.

During the event, Pro Wrestling Noah and WWE announced a joint collaboration via video in which they revealed that AJ Styles was set to face Naomichi Marufuji at Noah Destination 2024 from July 13.

== Results ==
No.	Results	Stipulations	Times
1	LJ Cleary defeated Ninja Mack and Super Crazy by pinfall	Three-way match	7:47
2	Real Zero1 (Chris Vice, Yoshikazu Yokoyama, Satsuki Nagao and Kubota Brothers (Hide Kubota and Yasu Kubota)) defeated Team Noah (Muhammad Yone, Atsushi Kotoge, Akitoshi Saito, Hi69 and Go Shiozaki) by pinfall	Ten-man tag team match	8:25
3	Shuhei Taniguchi and Titus Alexander defeated Daiki Inaba and Masa Kitamiya by pinfall	Tag team match	11:56
4	Hajime Ohara, Amakusa and Junta Miyawaki defeated Shuji Kondo, Eita and Yu Owada by pinfall	Six-man tag team match	9:11
5	Takumi Iroha defeated Great Sakuya by pinfall	Singles match	11:27
6	Good Looking Guys (Jake Lee, Yo-Hey and Tadasuke) defeated All Rebellion (Kenoh, Alejandro and Cristobal) by pinfall	Six-man tag team match	11:02
7	Yoshinari Ogawa and Ulka Sasaki defeated Ryohei Oiwa and Hayata by pinfall	Tag team match	13:26
8	Daga (c) defeated Starboy Charlie by pinfall	Singles match for the GHC Junior Heavyweight Championship	14:40
9	Brave (Naomichi Marufuji and Takashi Sugiura) defeated Good Looking Guys (Jack Morris and Anthony Greene) (c) by pinfall	Tag team match for the GHC Tag Team Championship	17:46
10	Kaito Kiyomiya (c) defeated Gabe Kidd by pinfall	Singles match for the GHC Heavyweight Championship	27:55
(c) / – the champion(s) heading into the match
