= Noah Destination 2022 =

2022 Pro Wrestling Noah event

NOAH Destination 2022
- Promotional poster featuring Kenoh and Satoshi Kojima
- Promotion: CyberFight
- Brand(s): Pro Wrestling Noah
- Date: July 16, 2022
- City: Tokyo, Japan
- Venue: Nippon Budokan
- Attendance: 3,215

Pay-per-view chronology
← Previous; CyberFight Festival 2022	Next → Departure 2022

Destination chronology
← Previous; 2021	Next → 2024

NOAH Destination 2022 was a professional wrestling event promoted by CyberFight's sub-brand Pro Wrestling Noah. It took place on July 16, 2022, in Tokyo, Japan, at the Nippon Budokan. The event aired on CyberAgent's AbemaTV online linear television service and CyberFight's streaming service Wrestle Universe.

The event featured ten matches with three of Noah's five championships on the line. The main event saw Kenoh defeat Satoshi Kojima to win the GHC Heavyweight Championship for the second time. Other top matches included Hayata successfully defending the GHC Junior Heavyweight Championship against Seiki Yoshioka, Sugiura-gun (Hideki Suzuki and Timothy Thatcher) defeating The Tough (Masa Kitamiya and Yoshiki Inamura) to win the vacant GHC Tag Team Championship, and Kaito Kiyomiya defeated Keiji Mutoh.

== Background ==
=== Storylines ===
The event featured ten professional wrestling matches that resulted from scripted storylines, where wrestlers portrayed villains, heroes, or less distinguishable characters in the scripted events that built tension and culminated in a wrestling match or series of matches.

=== Event ===
The night started with the eight-man action between Kongo (Hajime Ohara, Hi69, Shuji Kondo and Tadasuke) and Atsushi Kotoge, Daisuke Harada, Xtreme Tiger and Yo-Hey which solded with the victory of the cardinal team. Next, Anthony Greene, El Hijo del Dr. Wagner Jr., René Duprée, Simon Gotch and Stallion Rogers successfully overcame the team of Daiki Inaba, Kazushi Sakuraba, Kinya Okada, Masaaki Mochizuki and Shuhei Taniguchi in ten-man tag team action. The third bout portraited the confrontation of Eita and Kotaro Suzuki who defeated Stinger's Yoshinari Ogawa and Yuya Susumu. In the fourth match, Ninja Mack picked up a victory over Dante Leon. Next, Pro Wrestling Zero1's Masato Tanaka and Rob Van Dam defeated Nosawa Rongai and Super Crazy. In the sixth match, Go Shiozaki, Kazuyuki Fujita and Takashi Sugiura defeated Kongo's Katsuhiko Nakajima, Manabu Soya and Masakatsu Funaki. The seventh match saw Kaito Kiyomiya defeating Keiji Mutoh. The match was part of Mutoh's last series of bouts in Noah. Next, Hideki Suzuki and Timothy Thatcher defeated Masa Kitamiya and Yoshiki Inamura to win the vacant GHC Tag Team Championship after the titles had been relinquished by Kitamiya himself and Michael Elgin the same night, due to the latter not being able to make it to the title defense. In the semi main event, Hayata secured his second consecutive defense of the GHC Junior Heavyweight Championship against Seiki Yoshioka.

In the main event, Kenoh defeated Satoshi Kojima to win the GHC Heavyweight Championship, and ending the NJPW veteran's reign at only 34 days.

== Results ==
No.	Results	Stipulations	Times
1	Kongo (Hajime Ohara, Hi69, Shuji Kondo and Tadasuke) defeated Atsushi Kotoge, Daisuke Harada, Xtreme Tiger and Yo-Hey by pinfall	Eight-man tag team match	11:17
2	Anthony Greene, El Hijo del Dr. Wagner Jr., René Duprée, Simon Gotch and Stallion Rogers defeated Daiki Inaba, Kazushi Sakuraba, Kinya Okada, Masaaki Mochizuki and Shuhei Taniguchi by pinfall	Ten-man tag team match	13:29
3	Eita and Kotaro Suzuki defeated Stinger (Yoshinari Ogawa and Yuya Susumu) by pinfall	Six-man tag team match	5:38
4	Ninja Mack defeated Dante Leon by pinfall	Singles match	14:24
5	Masato Tanaka and Rob Van Dam defeated Nosawa Rongai and Super Crazy by pinfall	Tag team match	10:46
6	Go Shiozaki, Kazuyuki Fujita and Takashi Sugiura defeated Kongo (Katsuhiko Nakajima, Manabu Soya and Masakatsu Funaki) by pinfall	Six-man tag team match	12:59
7	Kaito Kiyomiya defeated Keiji Mutoh by pinfall	Singles match	26:28
8	Sugiura-gun (Hideki Suzuki and Timothy Thatcher) defeated The Tough (Masa Kitamiya and Yoshiki Inamura) by referee stoppage	Tag team match for the vacant GHC Tag Team Championship	20:38
9	Hayata (c) defeated Seiki Yoshioka by pinfall	Singles match for the GHC Junior Heavyweight Championship	20:45
10	Kenoh defeated Satoshi Kojima (c) by pinfall	Singles match for the GHC Heavyweight Championship	28:17
(c) / – the champion(s) heading into the match
