= Noah Limit Break 2 =

2024 Pro Wrestling Noah event

NOAH Limit Break 2
- Promotional poster of the event
- Promotion: CyberFight
- Brand: Pro Wrestling Noah
- Date: May 29, 2024
- City: Tokyo, Japan
- Venue: Shinjuku Face
- Attendance: 403

Pay-per-view chronology
← Previous; All Together	Next → Grand Ship in Yokohama

NOAH Limit Break 2 was a professional wrestling event promoted by CyberFight's sub-brand Pro Wrestling Noah and took place on May 29, 2024, in Tokyo, Japan, at the Shinjuku Face. Broadcasting was on CyberAgent's AbemaTV online linear television service and CyberFight's streaming service Wrestle Universe. The event also featured the participation of various wrestlers from Pro Wrestling Zero1, All Japan Pro Wrestling and DDT Pro-Wrestling.

Six matches were contested at the event. The main event saw Akitoshi Saito and Go Shiozaki go to a time-limit draw for the Zero1 World Heavyweight Championship.

== Background ==
=== Storylines ===
The event featured six professional wrestling matches that resulted from scripted storylines, where wrestlers portrayed villains, heroes, or less distinguishable characters in the scripted events that built tension and culminated in a wrestling match or series of matches.

=== Event ===
The event started with the singles confrontation between Yu Owada and Daisuke Sekimoto solded with the latter's victory via submission. Next up, Muhammad Yone and Yuto Kikuchi defeated Shuji Ishikawa and Black Menso-re in tag team action. The third bout saw the time's KO-D Tag Team Champions Burning (Tetsuya Endo and Yuki Iino) picking up a victory over Hi69 and Harutoki. In the fourth bout, Jun Akiyama defeated Atsushi Kotoge in singles competition. In the semi main event, Kazuyuki Fujita, Yoshi Tatsu and Genta Yubari defeated Kazusada Higuchi, Yukio Naya and Tomomitsu Matsunaga in six-man tag team competition.

In the main event, Akitoshi Saito and Go Shiozaki went into a time-limit draw in a singles bout disputed for the Zero1 World Heavyweight Championship, therefore Saito secured the second successful defense of the title in that respective reign. After the bout concluded, he received a title challenge from Chris Vice.

== Results ==
No.	Results	Stipulations	Times
1	Daisuke Sekimoto defeated Yu Owada by submission	Singles match	8:31
2	Muhammad Yone and Yuto Kikuchi defeated Shuji Ishikawa and Black Menso-re by pinfall	Tag team match	12:29
3	Burning (Tetsuya Endo and Yuki Iino) defeated Hi69 and Harutoki by pinfall	Tag team match	12:38
4	Jun Akiyama defeated Atsushi Kotoge by pinfall	Singles match	18:14
5	Kazuyuki Fujita, Yoshi Tatsu and Genta Yubari defeated Kazusada Higuchi, Yukio Naya and Tomomitsu Matsunaga by pinfall	Six-man tag team match	21:42
6	Akitoshi Saito (c) vs. Go Shiozaki ended in a time-limit draw	Singles match for the Zero1 World Heavyweight Championship	30:00
(c) / – the champion(s) heading into the match
