= Noah Dream On Final 2022 =

2022 Pro Wrestling Noah event

- Promotional poster featuring Naomichi Marufuji, Keiji Mutoh and Satoshi Kojima
- Promotion: CyberFight
- Brand(s): Pro Wrestling Noah
- Date: May 21, 2022
- City: Tokyo, Japan
- Venue: Ota City General Gymnasium
- Attendance: 924

Pay-per-view chronology
← Previous; Majestic 2022	Next → CyberFight Festival 2022

Noah Dream On Final 2022 was a professional wrestling event promoted by CyberFight's sub-brand Pro Wrestling Noah. It took place on May 21, 2022, in Tokyo, Japan, at the Ota City General Gymnasium. The event aired on CyberAgent's AbemaTV online linear television service and CyberFight's streaming service Wrestle Universe.

== Background ==
=== Storylines ===
The event featured ten professional wrestling matches that resulted from scripted storylines, where wrestlers portrayed villains, heroes, or less distinguishable characters in the scripted events that built tension and culminated in a wrestling match or series of matches.

=== Event ===
The night started with the confrontation between Kinya Okada and Kazuyuki Fujita solded with the victory of the latter. Next, Kai Fujimura and Yoshiki Inamura picked up a victory over Daiki Inaba and Junta Miyawaki. The third bout saw Shuhei Taniguchi defeating Mohammed Yone in singles action. The fourth match portraited Kongo (Hajime Ohara, Hi69 and Tadasuke) and Shuji Kondo overcoming the team of Momo No Seishun Tag (Atsushi Kotoge and Daisuke Harada), Hao and Yo-Hey. Next, Sugiura-gun (Hideki Suzuki and Takashi Sugiura) and Masaaki Mochizuki defeated Kongo (Katsuhiko Nakajima, Manabu Soya and Masakatsu Funaki). In the sixth match, Kenoh picked up a victory over Simon Gotch in singles action. The next bout portraited the internal stable clash between Chris Ridgeway and Yoshinari Ogawa, and Seiki Yoshioka and Yuya Susumu for the GHC Junior Heavyweight Tag Team Championship which ended in a no contest, therefore it was sanctioned as a successful defense for Ridgeway and Ogawa. Next, Hayata defeated Xtreme Tiger to retain the GHC Junior Heavyweight Championship for the first time in that reign. The semi main event saw Masa Kitamiya and Michael Elgin defeating Sugiura-gun International (El Hijo del Dr. Wagner Jr. and René Duprée) to capture the GHC Tag Team Championship.

In the main event, GHC Heavyweight Champion Go Shiozaki alongside Kaito Kiyomiya and Masato Tanaka succeeded in picking up a victory over the team of M's Alliance (Keiji Muto and Naomichi Marufuji) and Satoshi Kojima in six-man tag team action.

== Results ==
No.	Results	Stipulations	Times
1	Kazuyuki Fujita defeated Kinya Okada by pinfall	Singles match	7:11
2	Kai Fujimura and Yoshiki Inamura defeated Daiki Inaba and Junta Miyawaki by pinfall	Tag team match	10:55
3	Shuhei Taniguchi defeated Mohammed Yone by pinfall	Singles match	10:42
4	Kongo (Hajime Ohara, Hi69, Tadasuke and Shuji Kondo) defeated Momo No Seishun Tag (Atsushi Kotoge and Daisuke Harada), Hao and Yo-Hey by pinfall	Eight-man tag team match	15:15
5	Sugiura-gun (Hideki Suzuki and Takashi Sugiura) and Masaaki Mochizuki defeated Kongo (Katsuhiko Nakajima, Manabu Soya and Masakatsu Funaki) by pinfall	Six-man tag team match	15:54
6	Kenoh defeated Simon Gotch by pinfall	Singles match	10:47
7	Stinger (Chris Ridgeway and Yoshinari Ogawa) (c) vs. Stinger (Seiki Yoshioka and Yuya Susumu) ended in a no contest	Tag team match for the GHC Junior Heavyweight Tag Team Championship	21:04
8	Hayata (c) defeated Xtreme Tiger by pinfall	Singles match for the GHC Junior Heavyweight Championship	14:53
9	Masa Kitamiya and Michael Elgin defeated Sugiura-gun International (El Hijo del Dr. Wagner Jr. and René Duprée) (c) by pinfall	Tag team match for the GHC Tag Team Championship	23:22
10	Go Shiozaki, Kaito Kiyomiya and Masato Tanaka defeated M's Alliance (Keiji Muto and Naomichi Marufuji) and Satoshi Kojima by pinfall	Six-man tag team match	23:46
(c) / – the champion(s) heading into the match
