= Noah Deathnity =

2024 Pro Wrestling Noah event

NOAH Deathnity
- Promotional poster of the event featuring Akitoshi Saito
- Promotion: CyberFight
- Brand: Pro Wrestling Noah
- Date: November 17, 2024
- City: Nagoya, Japan
- Venue: Aichi Prefectural Gymnasium
- Attendance: 1,788

Pay-per-view chronology
← Previous; Star Navigation Premium: Akitoshi Saito Road Last	Next → The New Year 2025

Noah Deathnity was a professional wrestling event promoted by CyberFight's sub-brand Pro Wrestling Noah. It took place on November 17, 2024, in Nagoya, Japan, at the Aichi Prefectural Gymnasium. Broadcasting was made on CyberAgent's AbemaTV online linear television service and CyberFight's streaming service Wrestle Universe. The event featured the official retirement match of Akitoshi Saito.

== Background ==
=== Storylines ===
The event featured professional wrestling matches that resulted from scripted storylines, where wrestlers portrayed villains, heroes, or less distinguishable characters in the scripted events that built tension and culminated in a wrestling match or series of matches.

Akitoshi Saito nominated Naomichi Marufuji on November 6 as the opponent for the Saito's retirement match.

=== Event ===
The event started with two preshow confrontations streamed live on Noah's YouTube channel. In the first one, Alpha Wolf, El Hijo del Dr. Wagner Jr. and Galeno del Mal defeated Daiki Odashima, Junta Miyawaki and Yu Owada in six-man tag team competition, and in the second one, Anthony Greene, Eita, Harutoki and LJ Cleary outmatched Amakusa, Hitoshi Kumano, Mohammed Yone and Shuhei Taniguchi in eight-man tag team action.

In the first main card bout, Atsushi Kotoge, Go Shiozaki and Hajime Ohara picked up a victory over Alejandro, Kai Fujimura and Kenoh in six-man tag team competition. Next up, Ulka Sasaki defeated Jack Morris in singles action. The fifth bout saw Masa Kitamiya and Shuji Kondo defeating GHC National Champion Manabu Soya and Kazuyuki Fujita in tag team competition. In the sixth bout, Hayata and Yo-Hey defeated Ratel's stablemates Tadasuke and Yuto Kikuchi to secure the fourth consecutive defense of the GHC Junior Heavyweight Tag Team Championship in that respective reign. The seventh bout saw Daga defeating 2024 N Innovation winner Dragon Bane to secure the first defense of the GHC Junior Heavyweight Championship in that respective reign. In the semi main event, one half of the GHC Tag Team Champions Naomichi Marufuji defeated Akitoshi Saito in the latter's official retirement match.

In the main event, Kaito Kiyomiya defeated Takashi Sugiura to secure the sixth consecutive defense of the GHC Heavyweight Championship in that respective reign. During the event, Taishi Ozawa turned on All Rebellion to join Team 2000X and challenged Kiyomiya to a match set for Noah New Year 2025 on January 1.

== Results ==
No.	Results	Stipulations	Times
1^{P}	Alpha Wolf, El Hijo del Dr. Wagner Jr. and Galeno del Mal defeated Daiki Odashima, Junta Miyawaki and Yu Owada	Six-man tag team match	7:05
2^{P}	Anthony Greene, Eita, Harutoki and LJ Cleary defeated Amakusa, Hitoshi Kumano, Mohammed Yone and Shuhei Taniguchi	Eight-man tag team match	5:28
3	Team Noah (Atsushi Kotoge, Go Shiozaki and Hajime Ohara) defeated All Rebellion (Alejandro, Kai Fujimura and Kenoh)	Six-man tag team match	7:48
4	Ulka Sasaki defeated Jack Morris	Singles match	9:40
5	Masa Kitamiya and Shuji Kondo defeated Manabu Soya and Kazuyuki Fujita	Tag team match	9:25
6	Ratel's (Hayata and Yo-Hey) (c) defeated Ratel's (Tadasuke and Yuto Kikuchi)	Tag team match for the GHC Junior Heavyweight Tag Team Championship	13:07
7	Daga (c) defeated Dragon Bane	Singles match for the GHC Junior Heavyweight Championship	16:50
8	Naomichi Marufuji defeated Akitoshi Saito	Singles match This was Saito's retirement match.	15:09
9	Kaito Kiyomiya (c) defeated Takashi Sugiura	Singles match for the GHC Heavyweight Championship	30:02
(c) / – the champion(s) heading into the match; P / – the match was broadcast on the pre-show
