= United Japan Pro-Wrestling =

Professional wrestling association

- 日本プロレスリング連盟
- Abbreviation: UJPW
- Formation: December 15, 2023; 2 years ago
- Type: Nonprofit
- Legal status: General incorporated association
- Purpose: Supervision of domestic wrestling organizations
- Headquarters: New Japan Pro-Wrestling headquarters Sumitomo Nakanosakaue Bldg 1-38-1 Chuo, Nakano, Tokyo, Japan
- Founding chairman: Seiji Sakaguchi
- Board of directors: See below
- Key people: Sanshiro Takagi (Representative director); Naoki Sugabayashi (Executive director); Ryo Saito (Executive director); Ryota Chikuzen (Executive director)
- Website: www.ujpw.org

United Japan Pro-Wrestling (Japanese: 日本プロレスリング連盟, Hepburn: Nihon Puroresuringu Renmei; abbreviated to UJPW), officially the United Japan Pro-Wrestling Association (一般社団法人日本プロレスリング連盟, Ippan shadan hōjin Nihon Puroresuringu Renmei), is an association of several professional wrestling promotions in Japan, acting as an industry group in order to facilitate the sharing of resources and practices as well as strengthen connections to other sectors.

== History ==
=== Background ===
On April 15, 2020, due to the self-imposed restrictions of events in response to the COVID-19 pandemic, Takaaki Kidani, owner of New Japan Pro-Wrestling (NJPW) and Stardom through his company Bushiroad, led a delegation of representatives from seven promotions (Note: Takaaki Kidani, New Japan Pro-Wrestling (represented by Hiroshi Tanahashi and Chairman Naoki Sugabayashi), All Japan Pro Wrestling (represented by Suwama and Representative Director Tsuyoki Fukuda), Pro Wrestling Noah (represented by Executive Vice-President Naomichi Marufuji and Head of Public Relations Masashi Ishiguro), DDT Pro-Wrestling (represented by Harashima and Operating Executive Akira Takahashi), World Woman Pro-Wrestling Diana (represented by Kyoko Inoue and General Manager Taishi Fuwa), World Wonder Ring Stardom (represented by Mayu Iwatani and Bushiroad Representative Director Katsuhiko Harada), and Tokyo Joshi Pro-Wrestling (represented by Yuka Sakazaki and Representative Tetsuya Kouda)) to send a formal request for compensation for business suspension to then House of Representatives member Hiroshi Hase (an NJPW alumnus himself), the Japan Sports Agency, and the Ministry of Economy, Trade and Industry. This led to the formation of the Cross-party Pro-Wrestling and Martial Arts Promotion Parliamentary Group (Note: Japanese: 超党派 格闘技(プロレス・総合格闘技等)振興議員連盟, Hepburn: Chōtōha Kakutōgi (Puroresu Sōgōkakutōgi-tō) Shinkō Giinrenmei) in the House of Representatives on November 19.

=== Founding ===
Prompted by Hase's call to establish a unified commission of wrestling promotions and recognizing the necessity for collaboration between the government, local authorities, and the wrestling industry, an organization was formed by nine promotions owned by six companies; those promotions were NJPW, All Japan Pro Wrestling (AJPW), Pro Wrestling Noah, DDT Pro-Wrestling, Ganbare Pro-Wrestling (GanPro), Big Japan Pro Wrestling (BJW), Dragongate, Stardom and Tokyo Joshi Pro-Wrestling (TJPW). The United Japan Pro-Wrestling (UJPW) group was announced to be established on December 15, 2023. On May 6, 2024, a launching event was scheduled to be held at the Nippon Budokan. The inaugural chairman was Seiji Sakaguchi, a former wrestler, president and current advisor of NJPW, and the secretary-general was Naoki Sugabayashi, the current chairman of NJPW. While maintaining healthy competition among the industry, the organization aims to provide a space for exchanging opinions and information regarding common issues within the professional wrestling industry. By doing so, it intends to ensure the industry's image enhancement, foster sustainable development, and address shared challenges. UJPW also plans to welcome additional member promotions in the future. UJPW's inaugural event, the 2024 edition of All Together, was held on May 6 and also served as a charity event to benefit the rebuilding of the Noto Peninsula following the January 1 earthquake.

=== Expansion ===
On July 17, 2024, UJPW held a general meeting in Tokyo, where Kyushu Pro-Wrestling and World Woman Pro-Wrestling Diana were admitted into the association (as an observer member in the case of Diana).

On January 20, 2025, it was announced that UJPW would restructure as a general incorporated association with Sanshiro Takagi as its representative director, and Sugabayashi, Ryo Saito and Ryota Chikuzen as executive directors. On June 11, the board of directors had a second meeting. At this meeting, they accepted Pro Wrestling Freedoms as a new full member. They also approved Pro-Wrestling Dradition, World Woman Pro-Wrestling Diana, and Pro Wrestling Wave as supporting members.

On February 17, 2026, Sendai Girls' Pro Wrestling's Meiko Satomura and Pro Wrestling Freedoms' Takashi Sasaki were appointed as directors. On March 31, it was announced that UJPW would hold a new event titled "Face the Next" on May 12 at Shinjuku Face – before the closure of the event hall scheduled for September 30 which was announced earlier that month – featuring younger talents from NJPW, BJW, Noah, DDT, Dragongate, Kyushu Pro, Freedoms and GanPro. On June 29, at the fourth general meeting, Diana was upgraded from supporting member to full time member, while Gleat was admitted as a new supporting member.

== Members ==
Full members
Promotion	Operating company	Parent company
All Japan Pro Wrestling	All Japan Pro-Wrestling Co., Ltd.	N/A
Big Japan Pro Wrestling	Big Japan Pro Wrestling Kogyo Co., Ltd.	N/A
DDT Pro-Wrestling	CyberFight Co., Ltd.	CyberAgent
Dragongate Japan Pro-Wrestling	Dragongate Co., Ltd.	N/A
Ganbare Pro-Wrestling	GanPro Entertainment Co., Ltd.	N/A
Kyushu Pro-Wrestling	NPO Kyushu Pro-Wrestling	N/A
New Japan Pro-Wrestling	New Japan Pro-Wrestling Co., Ltd.	CyberAgent; TV Asahi; Amuse Inc.
Pro Wrestling Freedoms	Pro-Wrestling Freedoms Co., Ltd.	N/A
Pro Wrestling Noah	CyberFight Co., Ltd.	CyberAgent
Sendai Girls' Pro Wrestling	Sendai Girls' Pro Wrestling Co., Ltd.	N/A
Stardom	Stardom Co., Ltd.	Bushiroad
Tokyo Joshi Pro-Wrestling	CyberFight Co., Ltd.	CyberAgent
World Woman Pro-Wrestling Diana	World Woman Pro-Wrestling Diana Co., Ltd.	N/A

Supporting members
Promotion	Operating company
Gleat	Lidet Entertainment Co., Ltd.
Pro-Wrestling Dradition	Seahorse Corporation Co., Ltd.
Pro Wrestling Wave	Zabun Co., Ltd.

== Board of directors ==
The current board of directors is composed as follows (as of June 2026):

Position	Name	Company and occupation
Representative director Daihyō riji 代表理事	Sanshiro Takagi	Executive vice-president of CyberFight
Executive directors Gyōmu shikkō riji 業務執行理事	Naoki Sugabayashi	Chairman of board of directors of New Japan Pro-Wrestling
Executive directors Gyōmu shikkō riji 業務執行理事	Ryo Saito	Director of Dragongate Japan Pro-Wrestling
Executive directors Gyōmu shikkō riji 業務執行理事	Ryota Chikuzen	Chief director of Kyushu Pro-Wrestling
Directors; Riji 理事	Tsuyoki Fukuda	President and CEO of All Japan Pro Wrestling
Directors; Riji 理事	Yasuo Okamoto	President and CEO of CyberFight
Directors; Riji 理事	Narihiro Takeda	Director of CyberFight
Directors; Riji 理事	Eiji Tosaka	President and CEO of Big Japan Pro Wrestling
Directors; Riji 理事	Michiyoshi Mishima	President and CEO of Ganbare Pro-Wrestling
Directors; Riji 理事	Takashi Sasaki	President and CEO of Pro Wrestling Freedoms
Directors; Riji 理事	Meiko Satomura	Representative director of Sendai Girls' Pro Wrestling
Directors; Riji 理事	Hiroshi Tanahashi	President and CEO of New Japan Pro-Wrestling
Directors; Riji 理事	Taro Okada	President and CEO of Stardom
Directors; Riji 理事	Hitoshi Matsumoto	Executive vice-president of New Japan Pro-Wrestling
Directors; Riji 理事	Yukito Nagaoka	Associate attorney at TMI Associates
Auditor; Kanji 監事	Shinya Yamada	President of Entertainment Culture Tax Corporation; Certified Public Accountant and external auditor of Bushiroad

== See also ==
- Asia-Pacific Federation of Wrestling
- Global Professional Wrestling Alliance
