= Yoshiki Inamura =

Japanese professional wrestler

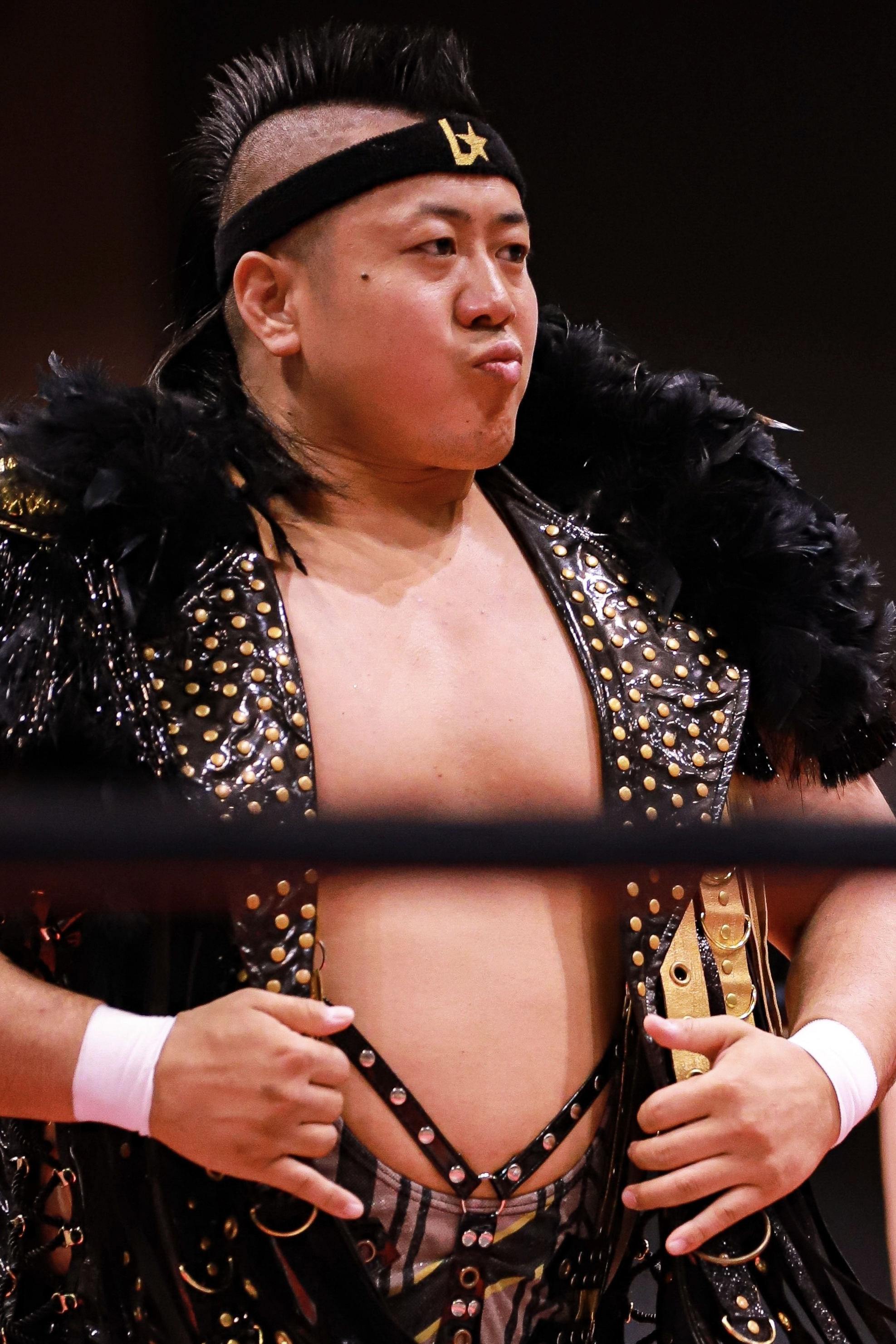
- Inamura in May 2023

Personal information
- Born: Inamura Yoshiki; November 18, 1992 (age 33) Ōtawara, Japan
- Education: Komazawa University

Professional wrestling career
- Ring names: Yoshiki Inamura; YOICHI
- Billed height: 182 cm (6 ft 0 in)
- Billed weight: 120 kg (265 lb)
- Trained by: Pro Wrestling Noah
- Debut: 2018

Yoshiki Inamura (稲村 愛輝, Inamura Yoshiki; born November 18, 1992) is a Japanese professional wrestler. He is signed to Pro Wrestling Noah where he is a former GHC Heavyweight Champion. He is also known for his time in WWE, making appearances on their NXT brand.

== Professional wrestling career ==
=== Pro Wrestling Noah (2018–present) ===
Inamura made his professional wrestling debut in Pro Wrestling Noah on August 5 at NOAH Departure 2018 where he competed in a battle royal won by Kaito Kiyomiya and also involving Atsushi Kotoge, Daisuke Harada, Junta Miyawaki, Masao Inoue, Mohammed Yone, Quiet Storm, Seiya Morohashi, Tadasuke, Yoshinari Ogawa, and three Chinese developmental wrestlers coming in as guest competitors Chang Jian Feng, Lin Dong Xuan and Sun Yi Lin.

Inamura competed in various of the promotion's signature events. At the N-1 Victory, Noah's biggest yearly event, he made his first appearance at the 2020 edition where he placed himself in the block B, failing to score any points after competing against Katsuhiko Nakajima, Takashi Sugiura, Kenoh, Naomichi Marufuji and Shuhei Taniguchi. Another signature even in which he competed is the Global Tag League, where he made his first appearance at the 2019 edition in which he teamed up with Masa Kitamiya and scored a total of four points after competing against the teams of Go Shiozaki and Katsuhiko Nakajima, Kazma Sakamoto and Takashi Sugiura, Kaito Kiyomiya and Kenoh, Maybach Taniguchi and Yuji Hino, Akitoshi Saito and Masao Inoue, Atsushi Kotoge and Mitsuya Nagai, and Muhammad Yone and Quiet Storm. At the 2020 edition, Inamura teamed up with Daisuke Sekimoto and fought in the block B, where they scored a total of two points after going against Go Shiozaki and Katsuhiko Nakajima, Takashi Sugiura and Hideki Sekine, and Akitoshi Saito and Masao Inoue. Inamura has been a member of the Kongo stable since 2019.

Inamura competed in various pay-per-view events hosted by the company. At CyberFight Festival 2021 on June 6, he teamed up with Kaito Kiyomiya in a losing effort against The 37Kamiina (Konosuke Takeshita and Yuki Ueno). At Noah Dream On Final 2022 on May 21, he teamed up with Kai Fujimura to defeat and Daiki Inaba and Junta Miyawaki. At CyberFight Festival 2022 on June 12, he teamed up with Katsuhiko Nakajima and Atsushi Kotoge to defeat Burning (Tetsuya Endo and Jun Akiyama) and Kazusada Higuchi. At Noah Destination 2022 on July 16, Inamura teamed up with Masa Kitamiya as "The Tough" in a losing effort against Sugiura-gun (Hideki Suzuki and Timothy Thatcher). At Noah Departure 2022 on August 5, he fell short to Kinya Okada in an N-1 Victory qualification match. At Noah Grand Ship In Nagoya 2022 on September 25, he and Kitamiya defeated Funky Express (Akitoshi Saito and Mohammed Yone). At Noah Ariake Triumph 2022 on October 30, he teamed up with Keiji Mutoh and Naomichi Marufuji to defeat Great Bash Heel (Togi Makabe & Tomoaki Honma) and Hiroshi Tanahashi. At Noah Global Honored Crown 2022 on November 10, he teamed up with Kai Fujimura to defeat Daishi Ozawa and Yasutaka Yano. At Noah The Best 2022 on November 23, he unsuccessfully challenged El Hijo del Dr. Wagner Jr. for the GHC National Championship.

At Noah The New Year 2023 on January 1, he teamed up with Daiki Inaba and Masa Kitamiya to defeat Akitoshi Saito, Muhammad Yone, and Shuhei Taniguchi. At The Great Muta Final "Bye-Bye" on January 22, he teamed up with Daiki Inaba and Masa Kitamiya in a losing effort against Good Looking Guys (Jake Lee, Jack Morris and Anthony Greene). At Noah Great Voyage in Osaka 2023 on February 12, he is scheduled to team up with Masato Tanaka and Masaaki Mochizuki in a losing effort against Sugiura-gun (Timothy Thatcher, Kazuyuki Fujita and Hideki Suzuki).

Following a winless record of 0–7 in the N-1 VICTORY 2023, on August 27, 2023, Inamura stated backstage that he would embark on an excursion to the United Kingdom in an effort to "break through the current situation."

On June 16, 2024, at Noah Grand Ship in Yokohama, Inamura made his return to Noah after a nine-month absence, reintroducing himself under the persona "YOICHI" to a Japanese audience for the first time. The character, inspired by Nasu no Yoichi, a legendary archer from his hometown, was revealed following Kaito Kiyomiya's successful defense of the GHC Heavyweight Championship. On July 13, 2024, at Noah Destination 2024 main event, YOICHI challenged Kaito Kiyomiya for the GHC Heavyweight Championship but his challenge ended in defeat. After the match, he commented, "YOICHI is over," and competed in the following month's N-1 VICTORY as his former persona, Yoshiki Inamura, finishing with a record of 3 wins and 4 losses. On September 8, 2024, at the Noah London tour event, following his defeat in the Progress World Championship match, he announced that he would resume his overseas excursion.

On October 11, 2025, Inamura returned to Noah at Wrestle Odyssey, where he confronted the reigning GHC Heavyweight Champion Kenta. On November 8, 2025 at Noah Star Navigation 2025, Inamura defeated Kenta to become the new GHC Heavyweight Champion. After six successful defenses, Inamura lost the title to Shane Haste at Noah Spring Mayhem on May 2, 2026, ending his reign at 175 days.

=== Independent circuit (2020–present) ===
In Big Japan Pro Wrestling, he competed in the 2020 edition of the Ikkitousen Strong Climb where he fought in the A block and scored a total of four points after going against Daichi Hashimoto, Ryuichi Kawakami, T-Hawk and Akira Hyodo.

Between September 2023 and May 2024, Inamura competed in an overseas excursion, wrestling for European promotions such as Progress Wrestling and Westside Xtreme Wrestling. On April 5, 2024, he defeated Ricky Knight Jr. to win the Progress Atlas Championship. However, on May 27, 2024, he lost the title to Axel Tischer in what became his final match in Europe before returning to Japan.

=== Pro Wrestling Zero1 (2021–2023) ===
Inamura has competed in Pro Wrestling Zero1 as a partnership talent between them and Noah. He competed in the Fire Festival, the biggest yearly tournament of the promotion in which he made his first appearance at the 2021 edition where he fought in the Block A and scored a total of fifteen points after going against Shinjiro Otani, Masato Tanaka, Hartley Jackson, Fuminori Abe and Tsugutaka Sato. At the 2022 edition, he fought in the Block B where he scored a total of eighteen points against Satsuki Nagao, Takafumi, Hide Kubota and Masato Tanaka, and then made it to the finals where he fell short to Daisuke Sekimoto.

=== New Japan Pro Wrestling (2022–2023) ===
Inamura competed in New Japan Pro Wrestling's Wrestle Kingdom series of events due to the partnership between Noah and NJPW. He made his first appearance at Wrestle Kingdom 16 where he teamed up with Daisuke Harada, Hajime Ohara, Daiki Inaba and Kinya Okada in a losing effort against Chaos (Tomohiro Ishii, Hirooki Goto and Yoshi-Hashi) and Six or Nine (Master Wato and Ryusuke Taguchi). One year later at Wrestle Kingdom 17, he teamed up with Kaito Kiyomiya in a losing effort against Kazuchika Okada and Togi Makabe.

=== WWE (2024–2025) ===
On November 6, 2024, NOAH announced that Inamura had begun an overseas excursion to WWE. Inamura worked on the NXT brand, where he teamed with Josh Briggs. They wrestled for the NXT Tag Team Championship at NXT Vengeance Day, where they were defeated. He also wrestled twice for the NXT Championship but failed to defeat Oba Femi for the title. On the August 19 episode of NXT, which was his last appearance in WWE, Inamura was defeated by Josh Briggs in a Philly Street Fight.

== Championships and accomplishments ==
- Pro Wrestling Illustrated
  - Ranked No. 31 of the top 500 singles wrestlers in the PWI 500 in 2026
- Pro Wrestling Noah
  - GHC Heavyweight Championship (1 time)
- Progress Wrestling
  - Progress Atlas Championship (1 time)
