= Ryuki Honda =

Japanese professional wrestler

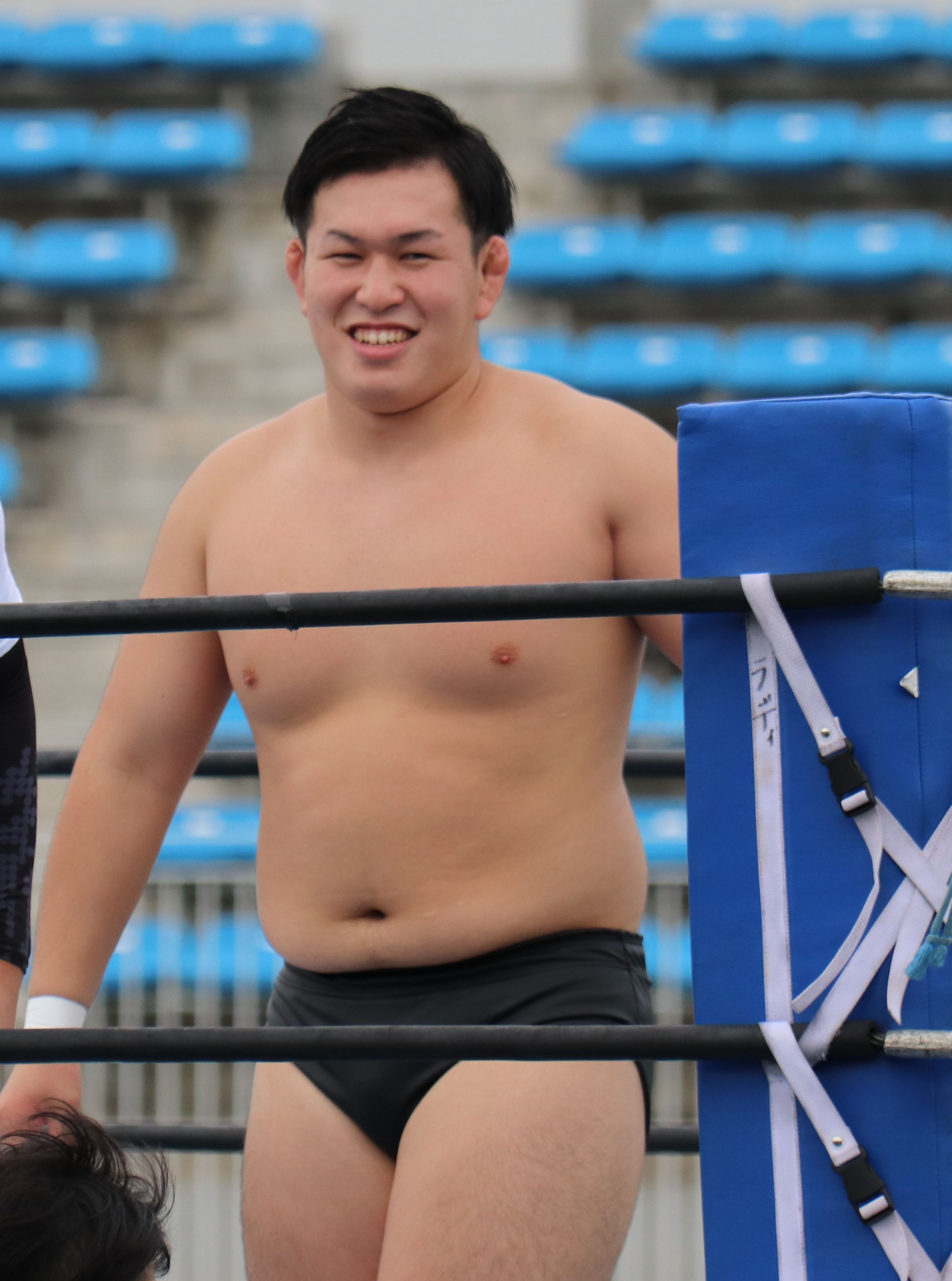
- Honda in August 2021

Personal information
- Born: February 11, 2000 (age 26) Machida, Japan

Professional wrestling career
- Ring name: Ryuki Honda
- Billed height: 180 cm (5 ft 11 in)
- Billed weight: 110 kg (243 lb)
- Trained by: Wrestle-1; Kaz Hayashi; Yuji Nagata
- Debut: 2018

Ryuki Honda (本田竜輝, Honda Ryūki) is a Japanese professional wrestler working for the Japanese promotion All Japan Pro Wrestling where he was former one-time World Tag Team Champions alongside with Shotaro Ashino.

== Professional wrestling career ==
=== Independent circuit (2018–present) ===
Honda is known for sporadically competing in various promotions of the Japanese independent scene. At Hono Pro-Wrestling Yamato Shinshu, an event promoted by Pro Wrestling Zero1 on March 27, 2021, he teamed up with Shuji Ishikawa in a losing effort to Evolution (Dan Tamura and Suwama. At Gleat G PROWRESTLING Ver. 3 on September 1, 2021, Honda teamed up with Koji Iwamoto and Shuji Ishikawa in a losing effort against Cima, Kaz Hayashi and Minoru Tanaka. At 2AW Infinity ~ 2021 Autumn, an event promoted by Active Advance Pro Wrestling on September 23, 2021, he teamed up with Seigo Tachibana in a losing effort against Taishi Takizawa and Takuro Niki.

=== Wrestle-1 (2018–2020) ===
Honda made his professional wrestling debut in Wrestle-1 at W-1 Pro-Wrestling Love In Yokohama 2018 on September 2, event where he teamed up with Hajime in a losing effort against Masayuki Mitomi and Ryuji Hijikata. During his two years with the company, he often competed for various titles such as the Wrestle-1 Result Championship for which he fought in the semifinals of a tournament against Ganseki Tanaka unsuccessfully at W-1 Pro-Wrestling Love 2018 In Osaka on September 29. Honda participated at the promotion's last show, the W-1 WRESTLE-1 Tour 2020 Trans Magic from April 1, where he competed in a 31-man battle royal won by Manabu Soya and also involving plenty of the promotion's top athletes such as El Hijo del Pantera, El Lindaman, Jiro Kuroshio, Yasufumi Nakanoue, Masayuki Kono and many others.

=== All Japan Pro Wrestling (2020–present) ===
After Wrestle-1's closure, Honda headed to All Japan Pro Wrestling, promotion for which he made his debut on the first night of the 2020 edition of the Champions Carnival from September 12 where he teamed up with Takao Omori and Black Menso-re in a losing effort against Purple Haze (Izanagi, Zeus and Utamaro) as a result of a six-man tag team match. He soon began chasing several of the company's championships. On the third night of the AJPW New Year Wars 2022 from January 23, he fell short to Kento Miyahara in a tournament for the vacant Triple Crown Heavyweight Championship. At AJPW Champions Night 4: 50th Anniversary Tour on June 9, 2022, Honda teamed up with Shotaro Ashino as "Gungnir of Anarchy" and defeated Twin Towers (Shuji Ishikawa and Kohei Sato) to win the World Tag Team Championship.

Honda is known to compete in various of the promotion's signature events such as the Champion Carnival, making his first appearance at the 2020 edition where he fought in the A block, failing to score any points after competing against Jake Lee, Shuji Ishikawa, Shotaro Ashino, Shigehiro Irie and T-Hawk. Another tournament in which he competed is the Ōdō Tournament, where he made his first appearance at the 2021 edition, where he fell short to Hokuto Omori in the first rounds of September 14. At the 2022 edition of the tournament, Honda fell short to Omori again in the first rounds of the competition which took place on August 7. As for the World's Strongest Tag Determination League, Honda made his first appearance at the 2021 edition where he teamed up with Koji Iwamoto in the D block where they scored a total of three points after competing against the teams of Kuma Arashi and Koji Doi, Zeus and Shigehiro Irie, and Takao Omori and Isami Kodaka.

On May 29, 2024, Honda challenged NWA World Heavyweight Champion EC3 for his title, in the first NWA World title match in AJPW in 35 years, and lost.

== Championships and accomplishments ==
- All Japan Pro Wrestling
  - World Tag Team Championship (1 time) – with Shotaro Ashino
  - AJPW TV Six-Man Tag Team Championship (1 time) — with Kuma Arashi and Seigo Tachibana
  - Ōdō Tournament (2026)
- Pro Wrestling Illustrated
  - Ranked No. 303 of the top 500 singles wrestlers in the PWI 500 in 2025
