= Jake Lee (wrestler) =

Zainichi Korean wrestler (born 1989)

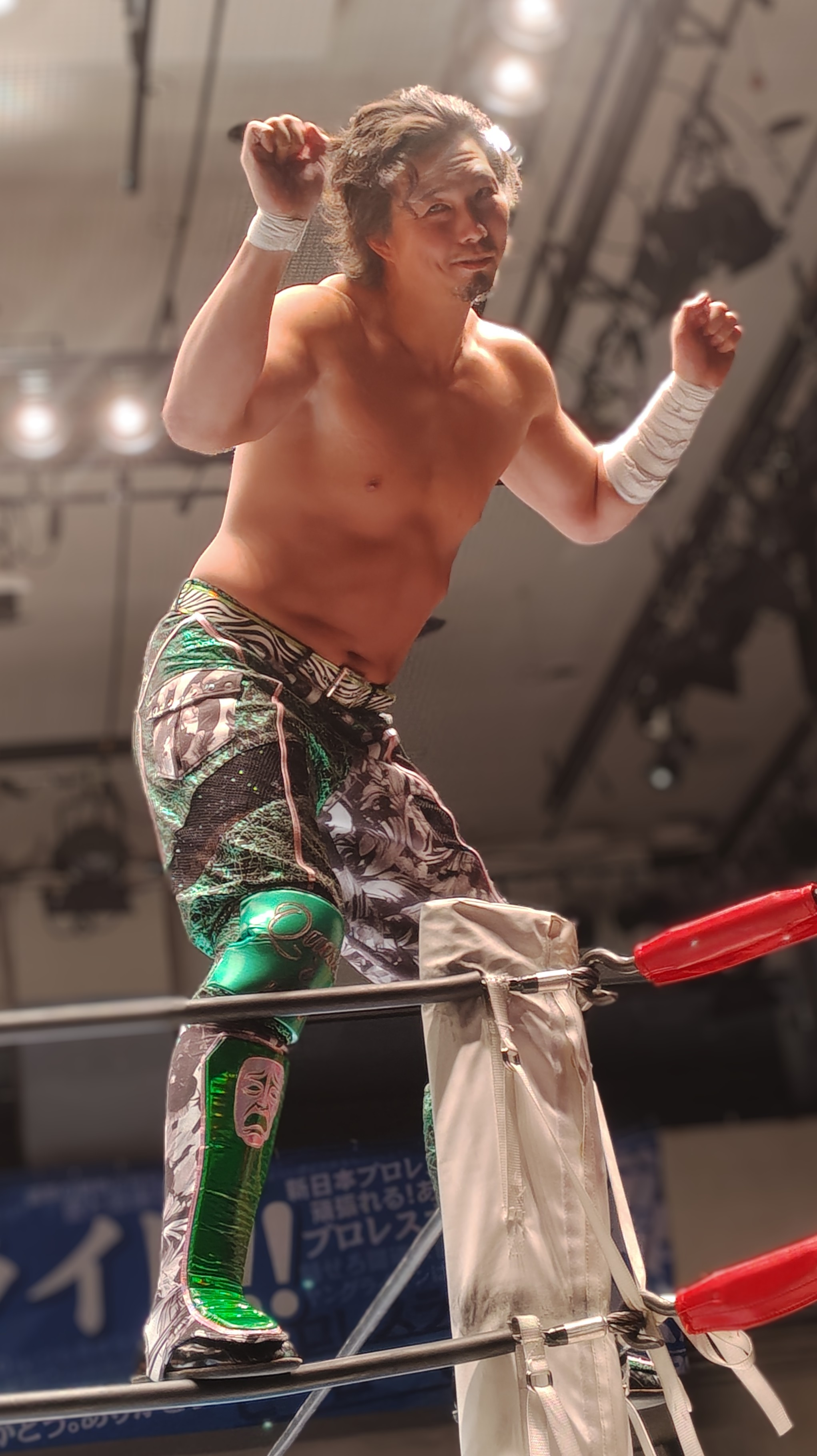
- Lee in 2026

Personal information
- Born: Lee Jae-kyung; January 19, 1989 (age 37) Kitami, Hokkaido, Japan

Professional wrestling career
- Ring names: Jake Lee; Lee Jae-kyung
- Billed height: 1.92 m (6 ft 3 1/2 in)
- Billed weight: 110 kg (240 lb)
- Trained by: AJPW Dojo; Atsushi Aoki; Keiji Mutoh; Kenichi Yamamoto; Taiyō Kea
- Debut: August 17, 2011

Lee Jae-kyung (Korean: 이체경; Hanja: 李在炅; Japanese: リ・チェギョン, romanized: Ri Chegyon; born January 19, 1989), better known by his ring name Jake Lee (ジェイク・リー, Jeiku Rī), is a Zainichi-Korean professional wrestler and former mixed martial artist. As of July 2024, he is signed to New Japan Pro-Wrestling (NJPW), where he is a member of the United Empire.

Known as the "Clown from Hell" (地獄の道化師, Jigoku no dōkeshi) and the "Silent Jester", Lee is best known for his stints in All Japan Pro Wrestling (AJPW) and Pro Wrestling Noah. In AJPW, within two runs between 2011 and 2022, Lee became a two-time Triple Crown Heavyweight Champion and Champion Carnival winner in 2021; during the latter run, he was known as "Madness of the Dark Side" (狂気のダークサイド, Kyōki no dākusaido). In Noah, he was the leader of the Good Looking Guys stable from 2023 to 2024 and became known as "Good Looking Emperor"; he became a one-time GHC Heavyweight Champion by defeating Kaito Kiyomiya at the Great Voyage in Yokohama event in March 2023. He joined NJPW after leaving Noah in 2024, becoming known as the "Smart Bastard" (stylized in all caps) after he joined Bullet Club War Dogs and was known as the "Smart Bastard". He left War Dogs in 2026 to defect to the United Empire.

Lee was acclaimed for his matches against the likes of Kento Miyahara, Kenoh, Yuma Aoyagi and Naomichi Marufuji, and is the second Triple Crown Heavyweight Champion of Korean descent (the other being Zeus) and the only GHC Heavyweight Champion of Korean descent. If Lee wins the IWGP Heavyweight Championship (as he is currently signed to NJPW), he'd become the fifth to win the three major Japanese heavyweight championships, and the youngest to do so.

== Professional wrestling career ==
=== All Japan Pro Wrestling (2011, 2015–2022) ===
==== Early career and first retirement (2011) ====
Lee joined the All Japan Pro Wrestling dojo in January 2011, initially training under Keiji Mutoh. He debuted on August 17 of that year using his real name in a loss to Taiyo Kea, and lost again the following day, this time to Ryota Hama, but on August 20, Lee picked up his first victory with a win over Yasufumi Nakanoue, and was once again victorious on August 24, teaming with Akebono and Masakatsu Funaki to defeat Joe Doering, Mazada and René Dupree. Lee represented AJPW in The Destroyer Cup Battle Royal at All Together 2011, eventually won by Kentaro Shiga.

Lee teamed with Takumi Soya on September 11 to defeat Soshun and Yasufumi Nakanoue, but was defeated by Soya and Takao Omori on September 17 when he teamed with Manabu Soya. After sustaining an injury, Lee announced his retirement from professional wrestling in October 2011 after just ten professional matches. Lee said in a 2016 interview that leaving professional wrestling "broke his heart". After leaving professional wrestling, he began to pursue a career in mixed martial arts. Soon after leaving All Japan, Lee joined Power Of Dreams, where he trained under Kenichi Yamamoto and competed in MMA for the next several years.

==== Return and Nextream (2015–2017) ====
Lee announced his return to professional wrestling and AJPW on May 21, 2015, now going under the ring name Jake Lee. His first match back took place on June 4, when he teamed with Jun Akiyama to defeat Takao Omori and Naoya Nomura. In December, after Kento Miyahara tried to join Evolution but was rejected by Suwama, Miyahara announced the formation of a new unit known as Nextream, consisting initially of Miyahara and Lee. On January 21, Nextream defeated Jun Akiyama and Yuma Aoyagi, and on February 13 defeated Akiyama and Takao Omori to become the new #1 contenders to the World Tag Team Championship. Lee and Miyahara unsuccessfully challenged champions Zeus and The Bodyguard on February 21. In April, Lee participated in the 2016 Champion Carnival, finishing with 2 points. On August 6, Miyahara and Lee received another opportunity at the World Tag Team Championships, this time losing to Daisuke Sekimoto and Yuji Okabayashi.

Lee took part in the 2016 Royal Road Tournament, but was eliminated in the first round by Ryoji Sai. In October, Miyahara and Lee were joined in Nextream by Yuma Aoyagi, and eventually Naoya Nomura. On October 31, Lee represented AJPW in an 8-man tag team match for Heat-Up Pro Wrestling, teaming with Takao Omori, Yuma Aoyagi and Yohei Nakajima to defeat Daisuke Kanehira, Koji Iwamoto, Shinya Ishida and Tatsumi Fujinami.

Lee and Miyahara participated in the 2016 Real World Tag League, winning their block with 8 points, but losing to Get Wild (Takao Omori and Manabu Soya) in the final. On February 17, 2017, Lee teamed with Miyahara to once again challenge Big Guns for the World Tag Team Championship, but again came up short.

In April, Lee participated in the 2017 Champion Carnival but finished last in Block A with 2 points, only scoring a win over Zeus. Following the Champion Carnival, Lee began teaming with Nextream member Naoya Nomura and the two challenged The Big Guns for the World Tag Titles on May 12 but lost.

On June 11, Lee got his first shot at the Triple Crown Heavyweight Championship against Shuji Ishikawa but came up short. On July 17, Lee and Nomura got another title shot against The Big Guns for the World Tag Team Championship but this time emerged victorious with both Lee and Nomura winning their first championship. On July 28, Lee and Nomura retained the titles in a rematch against The Big Guns but Lee suffered a knee injury during the match. On August 1, AJPW announced Lee and Nomura were stripped of the titles due to Lee's injury.

==== Sweeper (2018–2019) ====
In the spring of 2018, Lee announced his return to the ring as well as his departure from Nextream. He had his return match on May 24 teaming with Koji Iwamoto to defeat Nomura and Yoshitatsu. On June 13, Lee announced the formation of his own stable called "Sweeper" due to their desire to clean sweep All Japan by controlling their titles with the stable consisting of Iwamoto, Keiichi Sato, Ryoji Sai, and Dylan James.

In September, Lee entered the Ōdō Tournament, defeating Jun Akiyama in the first round on September 17, but fell to Kento Miyahara in the second round on September 22.

On September 24, James turned on Lee during a tag team match, forming a tag team with Joe Doering. From November to December, Lee entered the 2018 World's Strongest Tag Determination League teaming with Sai but finished 9th place with 8 points scoring wins over Tajiri & Gianni Valletta, Violence Giants (Suwama & Shuji Ishikawa), Jun Akiyama & Daisuke Sekimoto, and Kai & Kengo Mashimo.

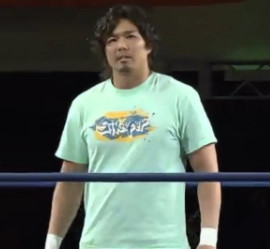
Lee in February 2019

On January 2, 2019, Lee won the January 2nd Openweight Korakuen Hall Battle Royal. On February 24, Lee teamed with Sai to challenge Strong BJ (Daisuke Sekimoto and Yuji Okabayashi) for the World Tag Team Championship but lost. On March 21, Lee teamed with Iwamoto to compete in a four team tournament for the vacant All Asia Tag Team Championships which they ended up winning by defeating Big Japan Pro Wrestling's Masaya Takahashi and Takayuki Ueki in the semifinals and Daichi Hashimoto and Hideyoshi Kamitani in the finals.

In April, Lee entered the 2019 Champion Carnival and tied for first place in Block B with Naoya Nomura with 10 points. Due to this, Lee defeated Nomura in a finalist decision match to advance to the finals where he lost to Triple Crown Champion Kento Miyahara. On May 5, at BJW Endless Survivor, Lee and Iwamoto lost the All Asia Tag Team Championships to Ryuichi Kawakami and Kazumi Kikuta, before regaining the titles on June 18. On September 23, Lee won his first major single accolade when he defeated Kento Miyahara to win the 2019 Ōdō Tournament. Lee would go on to lose his rematch with Miyahara on October 24 for the Triple Crown Championship. On October 10, Lee and Naoya Nomura announced their entry into the 2019 World Strongest Tag Determination League, to which Iwamoto questioned the reason for Sweepers existence. During the tournament, Lee would announce the dissolution of Sweeper and finished the tournament as runner up to Suwama and Shuji Ishikawa.

==== Jin (2019–2021) ====
On December 21, Lee, Iwamoto and Nomura officially formed the stable Jin (stylised in all caps). On January 3, 2020, Lee once again unsuccessfully challenged Kento Miyahara for the Triple Crown Championship. In March, Lee entered BJW's Ikkitousen Strong Climb and won three of his four matches. On March 23, Lee and Iwamoto lost the All Asia Tag Team Championships to Yankee Two Kenju (Isami Kodaka and Yuko Miyamoto). Due to the COVID-19 pandemic, several events scheduled to showcase the Ikkitousen Strong Climb were cancelled and all remaining matches were adjudged as draws, allowing Lee to progress to the semi-finals. On April 26, Lee lost to Quiet Storm via count-out. He participated in 2020's Champion Carnival and Real World Tag League with Iwamoto but was unsuccessful in both tournaments. On February 23, 2021, during a six-man tag team match against Enfants Terribles, the members of the stable turned on Shotaro Ashino. In the post match beatdown, Lee also attacked Ashino and turned on stablemate Iwamoto with the five men leaving together.

==== Total Eclipse (2021–2022) ====
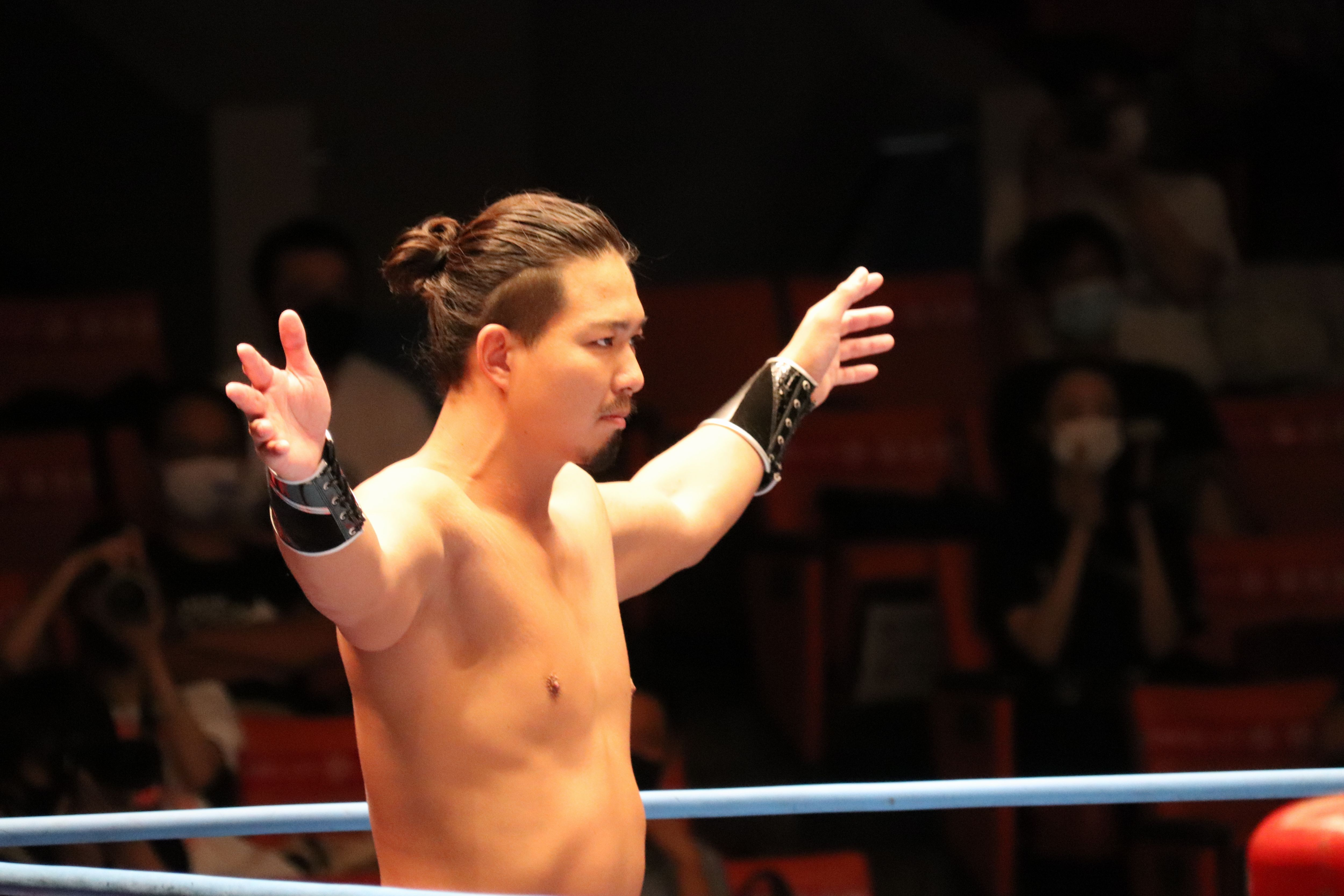
Lee in August 2021

On March 6, Lee, alongside, Hokuto Omori, Koji Doi, Kuma Arashi, Yusuke Kodama and Tajiri, debuted as Total Eclipse. They defeated Ashino, Iwamoto, Dan Tamura, Hikaru Sato and Suwama in a ten-man tag team elimination match which didn't include Arashi. Lee left AJPW after not extending his contract in December 2022.

=== Pro Wrestling Noah (2023–2024) ===
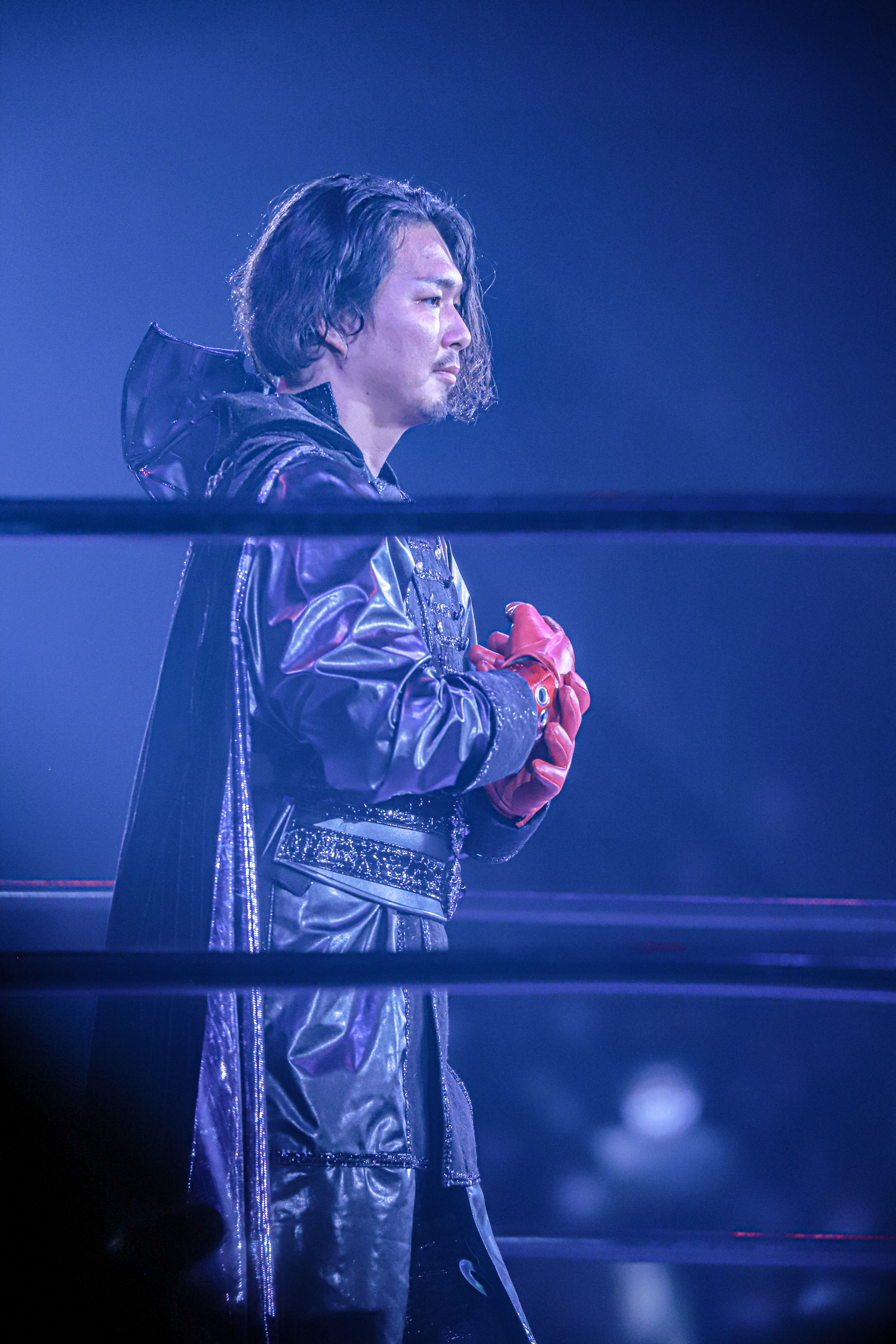
Lee in January 2023

Lee made his debut in Pro Wrestling Noah on January 1, 2023, at The New Year, congratulating Jack Morris after his match with Timothy Thatcher, with the two forming a team. On January 17, Lee and Morris announced the creation of the "Good Looking Guys" stable alongside Anthony Greene. The three underwent their first official match as a unit on January 22, 2023, at The Great Muta Final "Bye-Bye" where they defeated Masa Kitamiya, Daiki Inaba and Yoshiki Inamura in a six-man tag team match. On February 12, following a post-match interview, Lee challenged Kaito Kiyomiya to a title match for the GHC Heavyweight Championship. This led to a title match, on March 17, where Lee defeated Kiyomiya to win GHC Heavyweight Championship, becoming the first Korean descent person to hold the title. At Green Journey in Sendai on April 16, Lee successfully defended the title against Katsuhiko Nakajima. Lee then retained his title against Naomichi Marufuji at Majestic on May 4. On June 17 at Great Journey in Nagoya, Lee successfully defended the title for the third time against Takashi Sugiura. Following the match, Lee declared that he would become the first wrestler to enter to win all of his match in the 2023 N-1 Victory, as GHC Heavyweight Champion. However, in August, Lee finished the tournament with a record of four wins, two draws, and one loss, with a loss to Kenoh on the final day costing him a spot in the finals. On September 24 at Grand Ship In Nagoya, Lee successfully defended the title for the fourth time against 2023 N-1 Victory winner Go Shiozaki. After the match, Lee challenged Kenoh to a rematch for his title, after he was the one of ended his undefeated streak in Noah. On October 28 at Demolition Stage In Fukuoka, Lee lost the GHC Heavyweight Championship to Kenoh, ending his reign at 223 days.

On January 2, 2024, at Noah The New Year, after Kota Ibushi defeated Naomichi Marufuji in the main event, Lee and Kaito Kiyomiya confronted him, telling him to leave the promotion, before coming to a mutual agreement to continue pushing Noah forward in 2024. In interview, Lee stated that he couldn't feel that Kiyomiya was a good looking guy, as even his microphone was lacking. After Good Looking Guys defeated Kiyomiya's team on January 23, Lee stated that he wasn't interested in fighting Kiyomiya anymore, unless of course it was for the GHC Heavyweight Championship, ending their feud. The following day at Grand Ship In Yokohama, Lee announced that Good Looking Guys would disband on July 13 at Destination. At the event, Lee, YO-HEY and Tadasuke faced Morris, Greene and LJ Cleary in a winning effort. Afterwards, Gedo came to the ring and offered Lee to leave Noah to join the Bullet Club War Dogs in New Japan Pro-Wrestling, which Lee accepted. He was subsequently confronted by Morris, before attacking him and then sarcastically bid Noah goodbye. This marked Lee's final appearance for the promotion.

=== New Japan Pro-Wrestling (2024–present) ===
==== Bullet Club War Dogs (2024–2025) ====
On April 23, 2024, Lee made his New Japan Pro-Wrestling (NJPW) debut, assisting Drilla Moloney in defeating Tetsuya Naito. Afterwards, Bullet Club leader David Finlay, announced that Lee would team with Bullet Club War Dogs against Naito's faction Los Ingobernables de Japon in a five-on-five tag team elimination match. On April 26, Lee and Bullet Club War Dogs were defeated by Los Ignobernables de Japon.

After their match at Pro Wrestling Noah's event Destination 2024 on July 13, Lee's stable Good Looking Guys officially disbanded. After the match, Lee was met by Gedo, who offered him to join the War Dogs, which Lee accepted. Lee was then confronted by his now-former stablemate, Jack Morris, over his decision. He responded by attacking Morris and announced his departure from Noah. After leaving Noah, Lee signed with NJPW and participated in his first G1 Climax tournament, where he was placed in Block A. Lee finished his block with 8 points and failed to advance to the playoff stage. During the tournament, Lee formed a tag team with fellow War Dogs member Gabe Kidd as the “Mad Bastards”. On September 11, Lee suffered a right foot injury during a match, which put him out of action for the remainder of the year and the whole of 2025.

==== United Empire (2026–present) ====
On Wrestle Kingdom 20 on January 4, 2026 Lee made his return as the newest member of the United Empire stable and as the second mystery partner in their ten-man tag team match against his former War Dogs partners Finlay, Kidd and Moloney and the Unaffiliated duo of Hiromu Takahashi and Shingo Takagi, pinning Takahashi to gain victory for his team. Later on the same night, he attacked the newly crowned IWGP Heavyweight Champion Yota Tsuji, challenging him for the title. On February 11 at The New Beginning in Osaka, Lee failed to win the title from Tsuji. In March, Lee competed in his first New Japan Cup tournament, where he was eliminated by Hirooki Goto in the second round. At Dominion 6.14 in Osaka-jo Hall, Lee defeated El Phantasmo in a No Disqualification match. From July to August, Lee competed in G1 Climax 36 (A block) and finished with 6 points (3–5) and failed to qualify for the semis.

== Mixed martial arts record ==
Professional record breakdown
4 matches	1 win	2 losses
By knockout	0	1
By submission	1	1
By decision	0	0
Draws	1	

Lee Jae-kyung mixed martial arts record
Res.	Record	Opponent	Method	Event	Date	Round	Time	Location	Notes
Win	1–2–1	Kenichi Okino	Submission (keylock)	PFC.7	August 31, 2014	1	N/A	Sapporo, Japan	Openweight bout.
Loss	0–2–1	Takami Ono	TKO (retirement)	PFC.4	February 23, 2014	2	5:00	Sapporo, Japan	Openweight bout.
Loss	0–1–1	Toshihiro Taniguchi	Submission (guillotine choke)	PFC.3	November 3, 2013	1	0:43	Sapporo, Japan	Openweight bout.
Draw	0–0–1	Hiroshi Kozakai	Draw (time limit)	PFC.1	April 20, 2013	3	5:00	Sapporo, Japan	Openweight bout.

== Personal life ==
Lee became a vegan while training for MMA and obtained a teacher's licence in college. He also is an active personal fitness trainer, and has trained the Japanese musician Maki Ohguro.

== Championships and accomplishments ==
- All Japan Pro Wrestling
  - Triple Crown Heavyweight Championship (2 times)
  - All Asia Tag Team Championship (2 times) – with Koji Iwamoto
  - World Tag Team Championship (1 time) – with Naoya Nomura
  - Champion Carnival (2021)
  - Royal Road Tournament (2019)
  - New Year Openweight Battle Royal (2019)
  - All Asia Tag Team Championship Tournament (2019) – with Koji Iwamoto
  - Nemuro Shokudō Cup 6-Man Tag Tournament (2017) – with Kento Miyahara and Yuma Aoyagi
- Pro Wrestling Illustrated
  - Ranked No. 34 of the top 500 singles wrestlers in the PWI 500 in 2022
- Pro Wrestling Noah
  - GHC Heavyweight Championship (1 time)
- Tokyo Sports
  - Outstanding Performance Award (2021)
