= Akitoshi Saito =

Japanese professional wrestler (born 1965)

Personal information
- Born: August 8, 1965 (age 60) Sendai, Miyagi

Professional wrestling career
- Ring name(s): Akitoshi Nyanzawa; Akitoshi Saito; Super Akira Taue
- Billed height: 1.78 m (5 ft 10 in)
- Billed weight: 105 kg (231 lb)
- Trained by: Masashi Aoyagi; Yoshiaki Fujiwara
- Debut: December 20, 1990
- Retired: November 17, 2024

Akitoshi Saito (斎藤 彰俊, Saitō Akitoshi; born August 8, 1965) is a Japanese retired professional wrestler primarily known for his tenures with Pro Wrestling Noah (Noah) where he is a former five-time GHC Tag Team Champion and a former two-time Global Tag League winner in 2008 and 2011. Saito is also known for a seven-year stint with New Japan Pro Wrestling (NJPW).

== Early life ==
Prior to his professional wrestling career, Saito was trained in karate by Masashi Aoyagi. Saito seconded Aoyagi in his matches against Atsushi Onita in Frontier Martial-Arts Wrestling in 1989. He was trained for pro wrestling by Aoyagi and Yoshiaki Fujiwara.

== Professional wrestling career ==
=== Early career (1990–1991) ===
Saito made his pro wrestling debut in Pioneer Senshi and spent much of his early career in W*ING, a small promotion where he enjoyed moderate success.

=== New Japan Pro Wrestling (1991–1998) ===
He joined New Japan Pro-Wrestling in December 1991, along with his mentor Masashi Aoyagi, feuding with Shiro Koshinaka and Kuniaki Kobayashi. In 1992, the four formed a faction later named Heisei Ishingun, but left the promotion in 1998.

=== Pro Wrestling Noah (2000–2012) ===
After a lengthy hiatus, Saito made his surprise return to pro wrestling in October 2000 for Pro Wrestling Noah, teaming up with longtime mentor Masashi Aoyagi.

In 2001, he joined Jun Akiyama's STERNNESS faction as second-in-command and his career skyrocketed. Obtaining success like never before, he won the GHC Tag Team Title with Akiyama in September 2002, his first championship belt in his 12-year career. Akiyama and Saito proceeded to hold the titles for more than 8 months before losing them to Kenta Kobashi and Tamon Honda in June 2003.

Saito would go on to form his own stable, Dark Agents, with Takashi Sugiura, Masao Inoue and former Heisei Ishingun stablemate Shiro Koshinaka. He awarded himself the GHC Great Happy Christmas Championship in 2004, a title that was defended only once a year, on Christmas Eve. He would also challenge for the GHC Heavyweight Title on two separate occasions, in 2004 against Kenta Kobashi and in 2005 against Takeshi Rikio.

From March 29 to April 27, 2008, Saito and partner Bison Smith featured in NOAH's inaugural Global Tag League. The pair ultimately won the tournament defeating Mitsuharu Misawa and Yoshinari Ogawa in the final. As a result, the duo became number one contenders and on May 23, 2008, Saito and Smith defeated Naomichi Marufuji and Takashi Sugiura to win the GHC Tag Team Titles. The pair's first championship defense came five months later where the two defeated Jun Akiyama and Takeshi Rikio. On November 28 the pair made their second defense against Akira Taue and Takeshi Morishima. Shortly thereafter, Saito received a title opportunity against GHC Heavyweight Champion Kensuke Sasaki, however on December 7, Saito lost that title match. To finish the year, Saito won a two-night tournament simply named 'The Tournament' where he wrestled five matches with ten-minute time limits in the two nights with the result decided by judges if the time limit was reached. Saito defeated Masao Inoue in the final where the judges ruled in his favor 5–0.

As tag team champions, Saito and Smith took part in the second ever Global Tag League. The pair finished fourth in the eight-team block missing out on a spot in the final by only having lost to second place Takeshi Morishima and Kensuke Sasaki. The champions faced off with the tournament winners Mitsuharu Misawa and Go Shiozaki on June 13, however tragedy struck and, in the defense, Misawa suffered a spinal injury after a high-angle backdrop suplex from Saito and was later pronounced dead at the hospital at 10:10 p.m. JST.

The pair of Saito and Smith did not defend the championships again and their next attempted defense would occur on September 21 where they would ultimately lose the titles to Morishima and Sasaki. Shortly after, on September 27, Saito received another GHC Heavyweight Championship match against Shiozaki at the 'Great Voyage in Tokyo' event, which was also subtitled 'Mitsuharu Misawa, always in our hearts,' however Saito came up short in his effort to win the championship.

Saito won the 2011 Global Tag League becoming the first man ever to do so twice. Saito and partner Jun Akiyama received their title shot on May 8 against Takuma Sano and Yoshihiro Takayama, though the pair ultimately fell short in the attempt to win the championships. It was reported on December 29, 2011, Saito's contract with NOAH would not be renewed after it expires in January 2012. After his contract expired, Saito became a freelancer.

=== Freelance (2012–2014) ===
On January 22, Saito and Akiyama defeated Bad Intentions (Giant Bernard and Karl Anderson) to win the GHC Tag Team Championship. Since becoming a freelancer, Saito has lost a lot of weight, slimming down from 123 kg to 105 kg. On March 11, Saito wrestled his first non-NOAH match in All Japan Pro Wrestling, teaming with Atsushi Aoki and Akiyama to defeat Hiroshi Yamato, Keiji Mutoh, and Shuji Kondo. On May 23, Saito went to Tenryu Project, teaming up with fellow Heisei Ishingun member The Great Kabuki to defeat KAMIKAZE and Onryo. On June 3, he lost to Takeshi Morishima in an attempt to win the GHC Heavyweight Championship. On July 22, he and Akiyama lost the titles to TNA's Samoa Joe and Magnus, ending their reign at exactly seven months to the day. On October 26, he won back the GHC Tag Team Championship, this time with Go Shiozaki, from KENTA and Maybach Taniguchi, ending their 18-day reign.

=== Return to Noah (2014–present) ===
On June 13, 2014, Noah announced that Saito had re-signed with the promotion. That year, Saito partook in the 2014 Global League, which was his fifth in a row. Saito won six points defeating Takeshi Morishima, Katsuhiko Nakajima, and Satoshi Kojima, however he finished four points away from eventual block winner Daisuke Sekimoto. In April and May 2015 Saito partnered with Quiet Storm in the 2015 NOAH Global Tag League. The pair finished with four points having defeated the team of Mitsuhiro Kitamiya and Super Crazy as well as Colt Cabana and Chris Hero. They finished four points out of the block lead behind block winners Killer Elite Squad, a team compromising of Lance Archer and Davey Boy Smith, Jr. In November 2016, Saito, after a year not involved, participated in the Global League. This tournament proved to be unsuccessful as Saito won only one match, defeating Takashi Iizuka via disqualification, gaining two points in the tournament. On Noah's December 24 Winter Navigation tour show, the final show of the year for the company, Saito filled in for the injured Quiet Storm as Muhammad Yone's partner. While scheduled to be a title match against the GHC Tag Team Champions Go Shiozaki and Maybach Taniguchi, Storm's withdrawal from the match resulted in this becoming a non-title match. Saito and Yone were ultimately defeated by the heavyweight tag team champions.

Saito took part in another Global Tag League, this one with Yone as his partner. The tournament proved only mildly successful for the team as they finished sixth in the eight team block, however, the team did defeat GHC Heavyweight Champion Katsuhiko Nakajima and Masa Kitamiya on the final day of the tournament to prevent their team from a potential opportunity in the finals. On July 28, 2018, Saito and Naomichi Marufuji defeated The Aggression (Katsuhiko Nakajima and Masa Kitamiya) to win the GHC Tag Team Championship.

==== Retirement road (2024) ====
On March 31, 2024, Saito won his first singles championship, the World Heavyweight Championship at ZERO1 Noto Peninsula Earthquake Charity Pro Wrestling, a house show promoted by Pro Wrestling Zero1, defeating Chris Vice. At Noah Destination on July 13, 2024, Saito dropped the championship to Go Shiozaki. Saito then announced his retirement from professional wrestling would take place at the end of 2024 on November 17.

In his final match he wrestled Naomichi Marufuji, losing after 15 minutes in the semi main event of an event titled "Deathtiny", his retirement show. During his entrance he brought out Mitsuharu Misawa's robe as a tribute.

== Championships and accomplishments ==
- Pro Wrestling Illustrated
  - PWI ranked him #181 of the top 500 singles wrestlers in the PWI 500 in 2011
- Pro Wrestling Noah
  - GHC Tag Team Championship (5 times) – with Jun Akiyama (2), Bison Smith (1), Go Shiozaki (1), and Naomichi Marufuji (1)
  - GHC Great Happy Christmas Championship (1 time)
  - Global Tag League (2008) – with Bison Smith
  - Global Tag League (2011) – with Jun Akiyama
  - Global Tag League Outstanding Performance Prize (2009)- with Bison Smith
  - The Tournament Winner (2008)
- Pro Wrestling Zero1
  - World Heavyweight Championship (1 time)
- Tokyo Sports
  - Best Tag Team Award (1992) - with Shiro Koshinaka, Kengo Kimura, and Masashi Aoyagi
