= Go Shiozaki =

Japanese professional wrestler

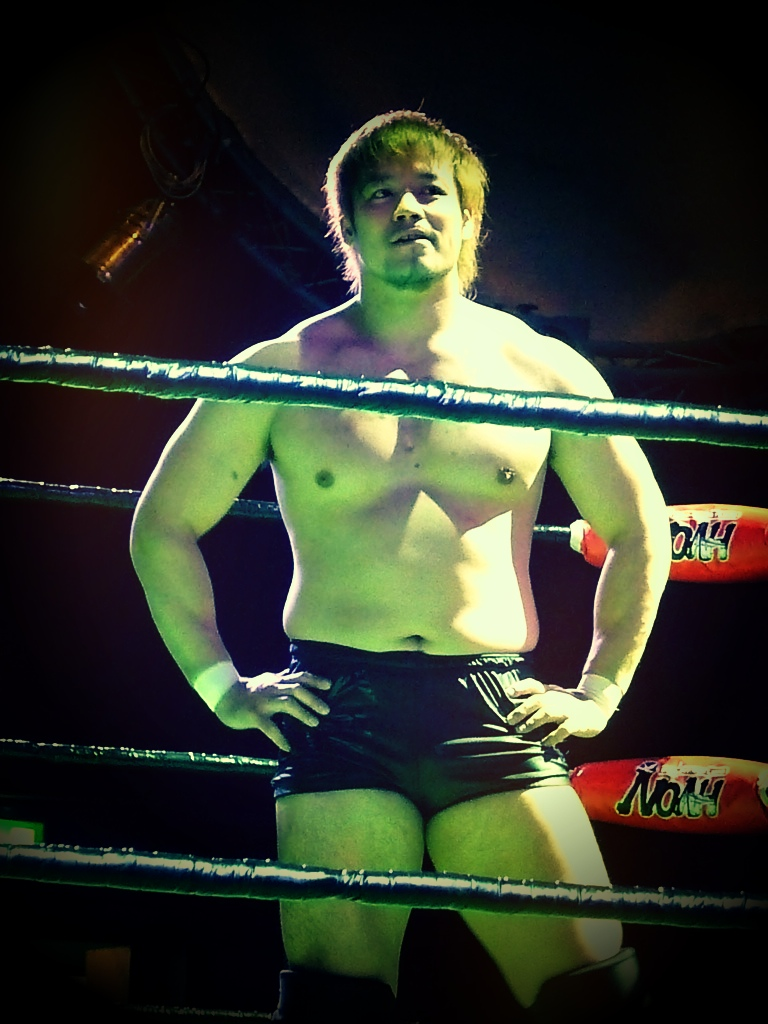
- Shiozaki in 2011

Personal information
- Born: January 21, 1982 (age 44) Kumamoto, Kumamoto, Japan

Professional wrestling career
- Ring name(s): Doga Dorobo; Go Shiozaki
- Billed height: 1.83 m (6 ft 0 in)
- Billed weight: 110 kg (243 lb)
- Trained by: Harley Race; Kenta Kobashi; Tamon Honda; Yoshinari Ogawa
- Debut: July 24, 2004

Go Shiozaki (潮﨑 豪, Shiozaki Gō; born January 21, 1982) is a Japanese professional wrestler. He is signed to All Japan Pro Wrestling (AJPW). He is best known for his time in Pro Wrestling Noah. He is a record-holding five time former GHC Heavyweight Champion.

He made his debut for the Pro Wrestling Noah in July 2004 and initially remained with Pro Wrestling Noah until the end of 2012 when he jumped to All Japan Pro Wrestling (AJPW). In AJPW, he became a one-time Triple Crown Heavyweight Champion and a two-time World Tag Team Champion, before resigning from the promotion in September 2015. Afterwards, he returned to Noah, where, in May 2016, he won the GHC Heavyweight Championship for the third time. He has also worked for American promotions Ring of Honor (ROH) and Full Impact Pro (FIP), winning the latter's World Heavyweight Championship. In August 2016, Shiozaki was appointed the chairman of Noah's wrestlers' association. In September 2025, he departed Noah after his contract expired and returned to AJPW a month later.

== Early life ==
Go was born as the third and youngest child in the family, with one older brother and sister. Due to the influence of his older brother who was a professional wrestling fan, he began to watch professional wrestling, especially All Japan Pro-Wrestling on TV from the second grade of elementary school, and became a fan of the Super Generation Army.

In youth he would play baseball, which he started in the third grade of elementary school, he served as a catcher who was assigned the 4th and 5th batters and won the eastern district of Kumamoto, his hometown. Similarly, in elementary school, he played against Miho Koga, a female professional golfer who was the fourth baseball player in Ace and later became a junior in the first grade of Tokai University, in a youth baseball game . At Kumamoto City Nishihara Junior High School, he joined the basketball club, served as a center forward in the position, and was appointed captain in the third year. Even after going on to high school, he continued to play basketball, becoming a regular player from the second year and achieving the best four in Kumamoto Prefecture.

After graduating from high school, he failed to take the police recruitment exam and lived a freeter life while attending a civil servant prep school. One day, he heard on TV that Mitsuharu Misawa, the founder of Pro Wrestling Noah said, "Anyone can be a professional wrestler if he has the guts." One day while reading the back of the "Weekly Wrestling" magazine, he saw an article about Kenta Kobayashi (later KENTA). The article would mention that Kobayashi had passed the AJPW rookie test, without having any background in martial arts, something Shiozaki was lacking as well. Go would later mention that this article would inspire him, and this was when he began thinking of becoming a professional wrestler.

== Professional wrestling career ==
=== Pro Wrestling Noah (2003–2012) ===
Shiozaki entered the Pro Wrestling Noah dojo in 2003 and according to the commentators from the event Universal Uproar, was the only man to graduate in his class as well as being the youngest wrestler on the roster. Following his debut, Shiozaki became a protégé of the legendary Kenta Kobashi. Shiozaki and Kobashi formed a very successful tag team and the biggest match the two had as a team was a losing effort against Kensuke Sasaki and his own protégé, Katsuhiko Nakajima. The match reached critical acclaim, being given a near-perfect rating from the Wrestling Observer Newsletter.

In the beginning of 2006, Shiozaki fractured his jaw against Kenta. Following his recovery, he began wrestling matches against the biggest names of the company and despite losing to them, he would put forth a valiant effort against them, similar to how Kobashi competed in All Japan Pro Wrestling. After Kobashi was forced out of action due to cancer, Shiozaki teamed briefly with Tamon Honda but was again defeated by Noah's top wrestlers until he finally broke his losing streak by pinning Ricky Marvin.

In late April 2007, Shiozaki represented Noah in the prestigious King of Europe Cup. He defeated Real Quality Wrestling representative Martin Stone in the first round before falling to Pro Wrestling Guerrilla representative Davey Richards in the quarterfinals.

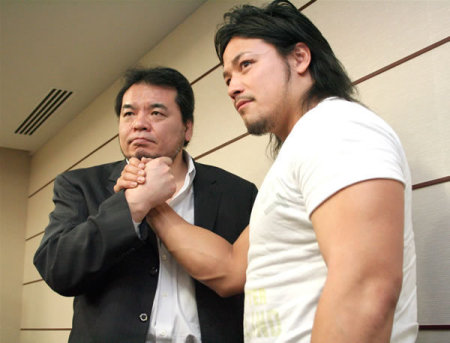
Shiozaki (right) with Mitsuharu Misawa (left) in 2009

Shiozaki returned to Noah in mid-2009 and gained a significant push as Mitsuharu Misawa's new tag team partner. They soon won the Global Tag League in May and thus became the top contenders to the GHC Tag Team Championship. During their title match on June 13 against champions Akitoshi Saito and Bison Smith, Misawa suffered a cervical spinal cord trauma during the match after receiving a belly to back suplex from Saito. After Misawa remained motionless following the suplex, officials quickly tended to him before he was taken to a hospital, where he died later on.

On June 14, reigning GHC Heavyweight Champion Jun Akiyama was forced to vacate the title due to herniated discs in his back. As a result, Shiozaki was nominated by Akiyama to wrestle for the title against the number one contender Takeshi Rikio. After a hard-fought twenty-minute match, Shiozaki managed to defeat Rikio to become the new GHC Heavyweight Champion. He then went on to successfully defend his title for the first time on September 27 against Akitoshi Saito. However his second title defense was unsuccessful as on December 6, Shiozaki lost the World Heavyweight title to Takashi Sugiura on the last date of the 2009 Winter Navigation tour. On May 23, 2010 Shiozaki teamed up with Atsushi Aoki to defeat Takeshi Morishima and Taiji Ishimori to win the AAA World Tag Team Championship during Pro Wrestling Noah's Navigation with Breeze show in Niigata, Niigata, Japan. As a result of the victory, Shiozaki and Aoki were scheduled to defend the title during AAA's Triplemania XVIII show. At TripleMania, Shiozaki and Aoki were the first team eliminated when Joe Lider pinned Shiozaki. The match and the title were ultimately won by Los Maniacos (Silver Cain and Último Gladiador). In August 2010 Shiozaki took part in New Japan Pro-Wrestling's 2010 G1 Climax tournament, where he won four out of his seven-round robin stage matches, only to narrowly miss the finals of the tournament after wrestling Shinsuke Nakamura to a 30-minute time limit draw on the final day of the tournament. The draw with Nakamura led to a No Time Limit match at a Pro Wrestling Noah show on August 22, where Shiozaki was victorious. Shiozaki and Nakamura had their third match on January 4, 2011, at New Japan's Wrestle Kingdom V in Tokyo Dome, where Nakamura was victorious. Shiozaki regained the GHC Heavyweight Title by defeating Takashi Sugiura on July 10, 2011. On January 4, 2012, Shiozaki returned to New Japan at Wrestle Kingdom VI in Tokyo Dome, where he and Naomichi Marufuji defeated CHAOS Top Team (Shinsuke Nakamura and Toru Yano) in a tag team match. On January 22, Shiozaki lost the GHC Heavyweight Championship to Takeshi Morishima. On October 26, Shiozaki and Akitoshi Saito defeated Kenta and Maybach Taniguchi to win the GHC Tag Team Championship. On December 3, 2012, it was reported that Shiozaki had threatened to not re-sign with Noah after his contract expires in January 2013, when the promotion decided to release Kenta Kobashi from his contract. Six days later, Shiozaki and Saito lost the GHC Tag Team Championship to Naomichi Marufuji and Takashi Sugiura. On December 19, Noah confirmed that Shiozaki would be leaving the promotion following December 24. On December 24, Shiozaki defeated Taiji Ishimori in his final Noah match.

=== Foreign excursions (2006–2009) ===
Shiozaki made his Ring of Honor (ROH) debut during ROH's August 2006 tour of England. In July 2007, he wrestled Bryan Danielson in ROH's debut show in Tokyo, Japan. He unsuccessfully wrestled ROH World Champion Nigel McGuinness in a title match on a Noah show in January 2008 before joining the ROH roster as a regular during February's event Eye of the Storm.

On June 6, 2008, Shiozaki participated in a one night tournament to crown new ROH World Tag Team Champions. He and partner World Champion Nigel McGuiness were eliminated in the first round by Kevin Steen and El Generico when Steen forced McGuiness to submit to the sharpshooter. The following day, Shiozaki received a title shot against McGuiness but lost when McGuiness forced him to submit to the London Dungeon. On June 28, Shiozaki revealed himself to be the newest member of Sweet 'n' Sour Inc., Larry Sweeney's heel stable.

In the summer of 2008, Shiozaki began performing for ROH's sister promotion, Full Impact Pro (FIP), based in Florida. He defeated Erick Stevens for the World Heavyweight Championship at FIP's event Heatstroke on August 23. He would hold the belt for four months, defending it on both FIP and ROH, before losing it to Tyler Black on December 20.

Soon after having a tryout match with World Wrestling Entertainment on September 5, Shiozaki began wrestling in Harley Race's World League Wrestling, where he also underwent further training under Race. On October 4, he won the WLW World Heavyweight Championship for the first time in a nine-man Battle Royal for the vacant title. He later lost title to four-time WLW World Heavyweight Champion Luminous Warrior on May 19, 2009.

=== All Japan Pro Wrestling (2013–2015) ===
On January 26, 2013, Shiozaki, Atsushi Aoki, Jun Akiyama, Kotaro Suzuki and Yoshinobu Kanemaru, all of whom had quit Noah at the same time, announced that they had joined All Japan Pro Wrestling (AJPW), forming the "Burning" stable. On March 17, Shiozaki and Akiyama defeated Get Wild (Manabu Soya and Takao Omori) to win the World Tag Team Championship. On May 11, Shiozaki made a one-night return to Noah to take part in Kenta Kobashi's retirement match at Final Burning in Budokan, where he, Kenta, Maybach Taniguchi and Yoshinobu Kanemaru were defeated by Kobashi, Jun Akiyama, Keiji Mutoh and Kensuke Sasaki. On July 5, following a mass exodus led by Keiji Mutoh, it was announced that Shiozaki, along with the rest of Burning, had signed an exclusive contract with All Japan. Afterwards, Shiozaki set his sights on the Triple Crown Heavyweight Championship, defeating reigning champion Suwama in a non-title Two Out of Three Falls match on July 14, the launching day of the post-Mutoh All Japan. Shiozaki received his shot at the title on August 25, but was defeated by Suwama. In September, Shiozaki made it to the finals of the 2013 Ōdō Tournament, after wins over Burning stablemates Kotaro Suzuki and Yoshinobu Kanemaru as well as top World Tag Team Championship contender Joe Doering, before losing to Akebono. On October 22, Shiozaki and Akiyama lost the World Tag Team Championship to Evolution (Joe Doering and Suwama). The following day, Shiozaki announced that he wanted to leave Burning in order to win the Triple Crown. On November 18, Shiozaki announced that he was forming a new stable named "Xceed", revealing Kenso as the first member of the group. However, in the stable's first match three days later, Kenso turned on Shiozaki and aligned himself with Bambi Killer and D'Lo Brown. Shiozaki was then saved by Atsushi Aoki, Kento Miyahara and Kotaro Suzuki, who became the newest members of Xceed. In December, Shiozaki and Miyahara made it to the finals of the 2013 World's Strongest Tag Determination League, before losing to Evolution (Joe Doering and Suwama). On February 23, 2014, Shiozaki received another shot at the Triple Crown Heavyweight Championship, but was defeated by the defending champion, Akebono. In April, Shiozaki participated in the 2014 Champion Carnival, where he was leading his block before suffering a broken thumb, which forced him to pull out of the tournament and forfeit his final round-robin match with Jun Akiyama.

On September 28, Shiozaki defeated Suwama in the finals to win the 2014 Ōdō Tournament and earn another shot at the Triple Crown Heavyweight Championship. Shiozaki received his title shot on October 29, but was defeated by Joe Doering. Shiozaki received a rematch with Doering on January 3, 2015, and defeated him to win the Triple Crown Heavyweight Championship for the first time. He made his first successful title defense on February 7 against Zeus. His second successful defense took place on March 27 against Xceed stablemate Kento Miyahara. On May 6, Shiozaki and Miyahara defeated Yutaka Yoshie and Shiozaki's next Triple Crown Heavyweight Championship challenger Akebono to become the new World Tag Team Champions. By simultaneously holding the Triple Crown Heavyweight Championship and the World Tag Team Championship, Shiozaki became the seventh "Quintuple Crown Champion". On May 21, Shiozaki lost the Triple Crown Heavyweight Championship to Akebono in his third defense. On September 28, it was announced that Shiozaki was leaving AJPW the following month and becoming a freelancer. The announcement also led to Shiozaki and Miyahara vacating the World Tag Team Championship. Shiozaki's final AJPW match took place on October 4, when he and Miyahara defeated Jun Akiyama and Yoshinobu Kanemaru in a tag team match.

=== Return to Pro Wrestling Noah (2015–2025) ===
==== GHC Heavyweight Championship reign (2015–2016) ====
On November 20, 2015, Shiozaki returned to Noah, announcing he wanted to again wrestle in his original home promotion. His interview segment was interrupted by Minoru Suzuki, who offered him a spot in his Suzuki-gun stable. On November 26, Shiozaki defeated Mitsuhiro Kitamiya in his Noah return match. When Takashi Sugiura turned on Noah and joined Suzuki-gun on December 23, Shiozaki announced that he wanted to join the promotion in its battle with Suzuki-gun. Naomichi Marufuji, however, turned his offer down. On January 31, 2016, Shiozaki's tag team partner Yoshinobu Kanemaru turned on him and joined Suzuki-gun. At the end of the show, Marufuji, after losing the GHC Heavyweight Championship to Sugiura, finally accepted Shiozaki's help in the war between Noah and Suzuki-gun. On May 28, Shiozaki defeated Sugiura to win the GHC Heavyweight Championship for the third time. Shiozaki made his first successful title defense on June 12 against Suzuki-gun member Shelton X Benjamin. The following day, Shiozaki officially re-signed with Noah, ending his days as a freelancer. On July 30, Shiozaki lost the GHC Heavyweight Championship back to Sugiura.

==== GHC Tag Team Championship pursuits (2016–2018) ====
On December 2, Shiozaki and Maybach Taniguchi defeated Davey Boy Smith Jr. and Lance Archer to win GHC Tag Team Championship. They lost the titles to Kenoh and Masa Kitamiya on January 21, 2017. On August 26 Shiozaki and Atsushi Kotoge defeated Maybach Taniguchi and Naomichi Marufuji to win GHC Tag Team Championship. They lost the titles to Muhammad Yone and Quiet Storm on October 1. In November, Shiozaki won his block in the 2017 Global League Tournament with a record of five wins and one loss and one draw, advancing to the finals. On November 19, Shiozaki was defeated in the final by Kenoh.

On January 6, 2018 Shiozaki saved Kaito Kiyomiya from an assault by Kenoh and Takashi Sugiura, the two would form a partnership, later dubbed as "GO-KAI". From March until April, Kiyomiya and Shiozaki took part of the Global Tag League, finishing the tournament with three wins, one loss and three draws, advancing to the finals. In the finals, Kiyomiya and Shiozaki defeated Kenoh and Sugiura to win the tournament. On April 29 at Great Voyage in Niigata, Kiyomiya and Shiozaki defeated The Aggression (Masa Kitamiya and Katsuhiko Nakajima) to win the GHC Tag Team Championship. They lost the titles back to The Aggression on May 29. In November, Shiozaki took part in the 2018 Global League, where he finished the tournament with four wins and three losses, failing to advance to the finals of the tournament.

==== AXIZ (2018–2020) ====
In December 2018, Shiozaki and Katsuhiko Nakajima formed a team, and the duo took part in a tournament for the vacant GHC Tag Team Championship. On December 7, Shiozaki and Nakajima defeated Kenoh and Masa Kitamiya in a tournament final to win the vacant GHC Tag Team Championship. Afterwards, Shiozaki and Nakajima were challenged by Hooligans (Maybach Taniguchi and Yuji Hino) to a match for their titles. On December 16 at The Great Voyage 2018 in Yokohama vol.2, Shiozaki and Nakajima lost the GHC Tag Team Championship to Hooligans. On January 6, 2019, Shiozaki and Nakajima received their rematch for GHC Tag Team Championship losing to Taniguchi and Hino, after their Hooligans stablemates interfered in the match. Later in January, Shiozaki and Nakajima named their team "AXIZ". Afterwards, on February 12, AXIZ faced GHC Tag Team Champions 50 Funky Powers (Muhammad Yone and Quiet Storm) in a non-title match. Nakajima would scored the victory for AXIZ, after Nakajima pinned Storm. After Atsushi Kotoge and Eddie Edwards couldn't challenge for the GHC Tag Team Championship, due to Kotoge's shoulder injury, Noah announced AXIZ as the next challengers to the GHC Tag Team Championship. On February 24, 2019, AXIZ defeated 50 Funky Powers (Muhammad Yone and Quiet Storm) to win the GHC Tag Team Championship for the second time. From April 7 until April 30, AXIZ took part in the 2019 Global Tag League, finishing the tournament with a record of five wins, one loss, and one draw, advancing to the finals of the tournament. On May 4, AXIZ was defeated in the finals by Sugiura-gun (Takashi Sugiura and Kazma Sakamoto). On June 13, AXIZ lost the GHC Tag Team Championship to Sugiura-gun, before defeating them in rematch on June 27, to win the GHC Tag Team Championship for the record-breaking third time.

In December, Shiozaki and Nakajima celebrated their 15th-anniversary debut match, leading on December 3, Shiozaki defeating Nakajima in their anniversary debut match. Afterwards, Shiozaki challenged Kaito Kiyomiya to a match for the GHC Heavyweight Championship on January 4, 2020. Things started civilly between the champion and the challenger. However, Kiyomiya began showing an egotistical attitude leading to the match, stating that would take the "leading role" at Noah's 20th anniversary year in 2020. Shiozaki didn't appreciate his attitude, leading the two to be separated twice after their match on December 7. On December 12, AXIZ teamed with Hitoshi Kumano in a winning effort against Kiyomiya, Shuhei Taniguchi, and Masao Inoue, after Shiozaki scored the win for his team, after pinning Kiyomiya. Afterwards, Kiyomiya found the loss regrettable and his arrogance began growing. In their final confrontation, AXIZ defeated Kiyomiya and Taniguchi, with Shiozaki scoring the win for his team, pinning Kiyomiya for the second time. After the match, Shiozaki loomed over Kiyomiya and placed a finger very firmly on his chest before leaving the ring. On January 4, 2020, at New Sunrise, Shiozaki defeated Kaito Kiyomiya to win the GHC Heavyweight Championship. The following day at Reboot, AXIZ lost the GHC Tag Team Championship to Masaaki Mochizuki and Naomichi Marufuji. In March, AXIZ took part in the 2020 Global Tag League, making to their second consecutive Global Tag League final by winning their block in the 2020 tournament with a record of two wins and one loss. On April 18, they were defeated in the finals of the tournament by Sugiura-gun International (Hijo de Dr. Wagner Jr. and Rene Dupree). On August 6, on the second night of Departure, after Shiozaki successfully defended the GHC Heavyweight Championship against Naomichi Marufuji, Kenoh challenged Shiozaki to a double-title match for the GHC National and Heavyweight Championships, stating that there could only be one strong champion in Noah. On August 10 at NOAH The Chronicle Vol. 3, Shiozaki faced Kenoh in a 60-minute time limit draw to retain the GHC Heavyweight Championship and unsuccessfully challenging Kenoh for the GHC National Championship. On August 20, AXIZ faced Sugiura-gun (Kazushi Sakuraba and Takashi Sugiura) in a losing effort for the vacant GHC Tag Team Championship. Afterwards, Nakajima turned on Shiozaki in order to join KONGOH, effectively disbanding AXIZ. From September 18 and October 11, Shiozaki took part in the 2020 N-1 Victory, finishing the tournament with a record of two wins, and three losses, failing to advance to the finals, losing to Kaito Kiyomiya in their head-to-head match.

On December 6 at Noah the Best 2020, after Shiozaki successfully defended the GHC Heavyweight Championship against Takashi Sugiura, Keiji Mutoh challenged to him to a title match at Destination, which Shiozaki accepted. On February 12, 2021 at Destination, Shiozaki lost the GHC Heavyweight Championship to Keiji Mutoh, in his sixth title defense, ending his reign at 405 days. Their match was named the Match of the Year by Tokyo Sports, marking the first time in ten years, that a match from NOAH received the award.

==== Record-breaking GHC Heavyweight Champion (2021–2025) ====
Shortly after losing the title, on March 15, it was announced that Shiozaki would undergo surgery, after dislocating his right biceps tendon, forcing him to be sidelined for eight months. He made his return on November 28 at Noah the Best 2021, challenging his former AXIZ teammate Katsuhiko Nakajima to a title match for the GHC Heavyweight Championship on January 1, at Noah The New Year. On December 27, following a victory in a ten-man tag team match, where Nakajima pinned Shiozaki, he stated that if lost to him at NOAH The New Year, Shiozaki should never repeat his catchphrase "I am Noah" again. At a press conference the following day, Shiozaki agreed to Nakajima's condition of never using his catchphrase "I am Noah" again, on the condition that if he won, Nakajima would be forced to reunite AXIZ with him. At the event, Shiozaki unsuccessfully challenged Nakajima for the GHC Heavyweight Championship, forcing Shiozaki to abandon his "I am Noah" catchphrase.

After failed to regain the GHC Heavyweight Championship, Shiozaki underwent a 4 match trial series to challenge for the GHC Heavyweight Championship, but lost all 4 matches. After defeating Manabu Soya on March 13 at Great Voyage in Yokohama, Shiozaki began his true road to the GHC Heavyweight Championship. On March 23, after avenging his loss to Nakajima, Shiozaki called out Kazuyuki Fujita, challenging him to a title match for GHC Heavyweight Championship at Majestic, which he accepted after mocking Shiozaki's catchphrase. The title match would be turned to a match for the vacant championship, after Fujita contracted COVID-19. At the event, on April 30, Shiozaki defeated Kaito Kiyomiya to win the GHC Heavyweight Championship for the record-breaking fifth time. He lost the title to Satoshi Kojima on June 12 at CyberFight Festival. In August, Shiozaki took part in the 2022 N-1 Victory, finishing the tournament, with a record of four wins and three losses, failing to advance to the finals.

The following month, Shiozaki was sidelined with an shoulder injury, which led to him return on April 16 at Green Journey in Sendai, announcing the would make his in-ring return on May 4 at Majestic. At Majestic, Shiozaki teamed with Kaito Kiyomiya and Yoshiki Inamura in a losing effort to KONGOH (Kenoh, Katsuhiko Nakajima and Manabu Soya). Afterwards, Nakajima decided to leave KONGOH to reform AXIZ with Shiozaki, which he accepted. AXIZ made their return match on May 14, losing to Kenoh and Soya. After a draw between Nakajima and Kenoh on May 31, Shiozaki challenged Kenoh to a match, which he lost on June 22. In August, Shiozaki took part in the 2023 N-1 Victory, finishing the tournament with a record of four wins, two losses, and a draw against Manabu Soya in their head-to-head match, meaning that both finished leveled on points in their block. This led to NOAH setting up a rematch between them to decide, who would advance to the finals, which Shiozaki won on August 27. On September 3, Shiozaki defeated Kenoh in the finals to win the N-1 Victory. On September 24 at Grand Ship In Nagoya, Shiozaki unsuccessfully challenged Jake Lee for the GHC Heavyweight Championship. On September 30, 2025, it was announced that Shiozaki was leaving NOAH after he decided not to renew his contract, ending his 10 year tenure with the company.

=== Return to AJPW (2025–present) ===
==== HAVOC (2025–2026) ====
On October 11, 2025, Shiozaki returned to AJPW after ten years, where he was revealed as the newest member of the HAVOC stable. Shiozaki then teamed with stablemate Shotaro Ashino to face Kento Miyahara and Hideki Suzuki, which ended in a disqualification victory after Miyahara attacked Shiozaki with a steel chair. After the match, Shiozaki proceeded to challenge Miyahara to a match for the Triple Crown Heavyweight Championship.

On January 2, 2026, Shiozaki announced that he had officially signed with AJPW, becoming a full-time member of the roster. On April 12, he began competing in the Champion Carnival for the first time in eleven years, defeating Yuma Anzai in his opening match. During the tournament, he also defeated Miyahara on April 18, before advancing from Block A to the knockout stage. On May 17, Shiozaki defeated Madoka Kikuta in the semifinals of the Champion Carnival tournament. However, he lost to Hideki Suzuki in the final, finishing as the runner-up.

==== Singles competition (2026–present) ====
Following the tournament, Shiozaki announced his departure from HAVOC, expressing his desire to face former stablemates Ashino, Xyon and Oddyssey in singles competition. The remaining members accepted his decision, and the group parted on amicable terms. On June 11, Shiozaki defeated Xyon in the main event of AJPW's Super Power Series, following their departure from the same stable. He subsequently continued competing in singles and tag team matches against wrestlers including Suwama, Ashino and Suzuki. In September, Shiozaki entered the Royal Road Tournament. He defeated Ren Ayabe in the first round on September 9, but was eliminated by Xyon in the second round on September 17. On October 3, he teamed with Miyahara to defeat Ayabe and Ryuki Honda in a tag team match. On October 11, Shiozaki teamed with Masayuki Kono and Suwama against his former HAVOC stablemates, but their team lost to Xyon, Oddyssey and Ashino.

== Personal life ==
Shiozaki is a supporter of his local football club, Roasso Kumamoto, which compete in J2 League. He also a fan of Korean music group, BTS.

== Championships and accomplishments ==
- All Japan Pro Wrestling
  - Triple Crown Heavyweight Championship (1 time)
  - World Tag Team Championship (2 times) – with Jun Akiyama (1) and Kento Miyahara (1)
  - AJPW TV Six-Man Tag Team Championship (1 time, current) – with Yuma Aoyagi and Yasutaka Yano
  - Ōdō Tournament (2014)
- Full Impact Pro
  - FIP World Heavyweight Championship (1 time)
- Lucha Libre AAA Worldwide
  - AAA World Tag Team Championship (1 time) – with Atsushi Aoki
- Nikkan Sports
  - Outstanding Performance Award (2009)
- Pro Wrestling Illustrated
  - Ranked No. 31 of the top 500 singles wrestlers in the PWI 500 in 2015
- Pro Wrestling Noah
  - GHC Heavyweight Championship (5 times)
  - GHC Tag Team Championship (7 times) – with Akitoshi Saito (1), Maybach Taniguchi (1), Atsushi Kotoge (1), Kaito Kiyomiya (1), and Katsuhiko Nakajima (3)
  - N-1 Victory (2023)
  - Global Tag League (2009) – with Mitsuharu Misawa
  - Global Tag League (2018) – with Kaito Kiyomiya
  - One Night Six-Man Tag Team Tournament (2007) – with Naomichi Marufuji and Ippei Ota
- Pro Wrestling Zero1
  - World Heavyweight Championship (1 time)
- Tokyo Sports
  - Best Bout Award (2021) vs. Keiji Mutoh (February 12 at Destination 2021: Back to Budokan)
  - Outstanding Performance Award (2020)
- World League Wrestling
  - WLW Heavyweight Championship (1 time)
