= Noah Great Voyage in Yokohama 2023 =

2023 Pro Wrestling Noah event

NOAH Great Voyage in Yokohama 2023
- Promotional poster featuring Kaito Kiyomiya and Jake Lee
- Promotion: CyberFight
- Brand(s): Pro Wrestling Noah
- Date: March 19, 2023
- City: Yokohama, Japan
- Venue: Yokohama Budokan
- Attendance: 1,308

Pay-per-view chronology
← Previous; Star Navigation 2023	Next → Green Journey in Sendai 2023

Great Voyage in Yokohama chronology
← Previous —	Next → 2024

NOAH Great Voyage in Yokohama 2023 was a professional wrestling event promoted by CyberFight's sub-brand Pro Wrestling Noah. It took place on March 19, 2023, in Yokohama, Japan, at the Yokohama Budokan. The event aired on CyberAgent's AbemaTV online linear television service and CyberFight's streaming service Wrestle Universe.

Ten matches were contested at the event, including two on the pre-show, and three of Noah's five championships were on the line. The main event saw Jake Lee defeat Kaito Kiyomiya to win the GHC Heavyweight Championship for the first time. Other top matches included Yoshinari Ogawa and Eita successfully defending the GHC Junior Heavyweight Tag Team Championship against Stinger (Hayata and Chris Ridgeway), and Masa Kitamiya and Daiki Inaba defeated Kongo (Kenoh and Manabu Soya) to retain the GHC Tag Team Championship.

== Storylines ==
The event featured ten professional wrestling matches that involve different wrestlers from pre-existing scripted feuds and storylines. Wrestlers portray villains, heroes, or less distinguishable characters in scripted events that build tension and culminate in a wrestling match or series of matches.

=== Event ===
Following the events from Great Voyage in Osaka from February 12, 2023, it was revealed that Jake Lee was set to be the next number one contender for Kiyomiya's Heavyweight Championship.

The event started with two preshow matches broadcast on Noah's YouTube channel. In the first one, Yasutaka Yano picked up a victory over Daishi Ozawa in singles competition. In the next one, Atsushi Kotoge, Yo-Hey, Seiki Yoshioka and Alejandro overcame the team of Shuji Kondo, Tadasuke, Hajime Ohara and Hi69. In the first main card match, Katsuhiko Nakajima defeated Kinya Okada in singles competition. Next up, Hideki Suzuki and Saxon Huxley outmatched Mohammed Yone and Yoshiki Inamura. In the fifth bout, Shuhei Taniguchi defeated Takashi Sugiura. In the sixth bout, Good Looking Guys (Jack Morris and Anthony Greene) defeated Naomichi Marufuji and El Hijo de Dr. Wagner Jr.. Next, Extreme Tiger and Lanzeloth defeated GHC Junior Heavyweight Champion Amakusa and Ninja Mack in tag team action. In the eighth bout, Masa Kitamiya and Daiki Inaba defended the GHC Tag Team Championship for the first time against Kongo (Kenoh and Manabu Soya). After the match concluded, All Japan Pro Wrestling's Kento Miyahara stepped up to challenge Kitamiya for "Dream Power Series" on March 21, 2023. In the semi main event, Yoshinari Ogawa and Eita retained the GHC Junior Heavyweight Tag Team Championship for the second time consecutively in that respective reign against Hayata and Chris Ridgeway. After the bout concluded, Ogawa slapped Eita and shook hands with Hayata and Ridgeway, reminding him that he was still part of Stinger as he left Eita behind in the ring.

In the main event, Jake Lee defeated Kaito Kiyomiya to win the GHC Heavyweight Championship. Tadasuke was also shown wearing a "Good Looking Guys" shirt before the match, hinting his defection from Kongo. After the bout concluded, Katsuhiko Nakajima issued a challenge for Lee's title.

== Results ==
No.	Results	Stipulations	Times
1^{P}	Yasutaka Yano defeated Taishi Ozawa	Singles match	4:56
2^{P}	Atsushi Kotoge, Yo-Hey, Seiki Yoshioka and Alejandro defeated Kongo (Shuji Kondo, Tadasuke, Hajime Ohara and Hi69)	Eight-man tag team match	5:00
3	Katsuhiko Nakajima defeated Kinya Okada	Singles match	5:48
4	Hideki Suzuki and Saxon Huxley defeated Mohammed Yone and Yoshiki Inamura	Tag team match	7:55
5	Shuhei Taniguchi defeated Takashi Sugiura	Singles match	11:43
6	Good Looking Guys (Jack Morris and Anthony Greene) defeated Naomichi Marufuji and El Hijo de Dr. Wagner Jr.	Tag team match	13:23
7	Extreme Tiger and Lanzeloth defeated Amakusa and Ninja Mack	Tag team match	10:16
8	Masa Kitamiya and Daiki Inaba (c) defeated Kongo (Kenoh and Manabu Soya)	Tag team match for the GHC Tag Team Championship	21:44
9	Yoshinari Ogawa and Eita (c) defeated Stinger (Hayata and Chris Ridgeway)	Tag team match for the GHC Junior Heavyweight Tag Team Championship	25:29
10	Jake Lee defeated Kaito Kiyomiya (c)	Singles match for the GHC Heavyweight Championship	35:36
(c) / – the champion(s) heading into the match; P / – the match was broadcast on the pre-show
