= Noah Star Navigation 2023 =

2023 Pro Wrestling Noah event

Star Navigation 2023 (Night 1)
- Promotional poster for the first night of the event featuring El Hijo de Dr. Wagner Jr. and Manabu Soya
- Promotion: CyberFight
- Brand: Pro Wrestling Noah
- Date: February 5, 2023
- City: Tokyo, Japan
- Venue: Korakuen Hall
- Attendance: 825 (Night 1)

Pay-per-view chronology
← Previous; The Great Muta Final "Bye-Bye"	Next → Great Voyage in Osaka 2023

Star Navigation chronology
← Previous; 2022	Next → 2024

Star Navigation 2023 was a two-night professional wrestling event promoted by CyberFight's sub-brand Pro Wrestling Noah. It took place on February 5 and March 9, 2023, in Tokyo, Japan, at the Korakuen Hall. The event aired CyberAgent's AbemaTV online linear television service and CyberFight's streaming service Wrestle Universe.

The card comprised a total of 17 matches, with eight on the first night and nine on the second, including two matches on Night 2's pre-show. Two of Noah's six championships were on the line. In the main event for Night 1, El Hijo de Dr. Wagner Jr. defeated Manabu Soya to retain the GHC National Championship. In the main event for Night 2, Amakusa defeated Hi69 to retain the GHC Junior Heavyweight Championship.

== Storylines ==
The event featured a total of seventeen professional wrestling matches (eight in the first night and nine in the second) that involve different wrestlers from pre-existing scripted feuds and storylines. Wrestlers portray villains, heroes, or less distinguishable characters in scripted events that build tension and culminate in a wrestling match or series of matches.

== Night 1 ==
=== Preliminary matches ===
The first night of the event which took place on February 5, started with the confrontation between Tadasuke and Hi69 and Kinya Okada and Daishi Ozawa which solded with the victory of the preceding team. The second bout saw Super Crazy getting a victory over Yasutaka Yano in singles competition. Next up, Timothy Thatcher and Hideki Suzuki of Sugiura-gun defeated Masaaki Mochizuki and Shuhei Taniguchi in tag team action. The fourth bout saw the team of Kenoh, Katsuhiko Nakajima, Shuji Kondo and Hajime Ohara outmatching Daiki Inaba, Yoshiki Inamura, Ninja Mack and Atsushi Kotoge. In the fifth match, one half of the GHC Tag Team Champions Satoshi Kojima defeated Masa Kitamiya in singles action. Next, Kaito Kiyomiya, Naomichi Marafuji and Takashi Sugiura defeated the team of Jack Morris, Jake Lee and Anthony Greene, bout after Kiyomiya fired up his short-term feud with Morris which eventually concluded with their clash for the GHC Heavyweight Championship seven days later at Great Voyage in Osaka. In the semi main event, GHC Junior Heavyweight Tag Team Champions Yoshinari Ogawa and Eita alongside Nosawa Rongai, Chris Ridgeway and Daga defeated Amakusa, Junta Miyawaki, Alejandro, Yo-Hey and Seiki Yoshioka in an elimination tag team match from which Miwayaki was last eliminated.

=== Main event ===
In the main event, El Hijo de Dr. Wagner Jr. defeated Manabu Soya to secure his second consecutive defense of the GHC National Championship.

No.	Results	Stipulations	Times
1	Kongo (Tadasuke and Hi69) defeated Kinya Okada and Taishi Ozawa	Tag team match	7:04
2	Super Crazy defeated Yasutaka Yano	Singles match	7:03
3	Sugiura-gun (Timothy Thatcher and Hideki Suzuki) defeated Masaaki Mochizuki and Shuhei Taniguchi	Tag team match	9:53
4	Kongo (Kenoh, Katsuhiko Nakajima, Shuji Kondo and Hajime Ohara) defeated Daiki Inaba, Yoshiki Inamura, Ninja Mack and Atsushi Kotoge	Eight-man tag team match	7:11
5	Satoshi Kojima defeated Masa Kitamiya	Singles match	10:34
6	Kaito Kiyomiya, Naomichi Marufuji and Takashi Sugiura defeated Good Looking Guys (Jack Morris, Jake Lee and Anthony Greene)	Six-man tag team match	17:49
7	Yoshinari Ogawa, Eita, Nosawa Rongai, Chris Ridgeway and Daga defeated Amakusa, Junta Miyawaki, Alejandro, Yo-Hey and Seiki Yoshioka	Ten-man elimination tag team match	22:53
8	El Hijo de Dr. Wagner Jr. (c) defeated Manabu Soya	Singles match for the GHC National Championship	20:46
(c) / – the champion(s) heading into the match

== Night 2 ==
Star Navigation 2023 (Night 2)
- Promotional poster featuring Daisuke Harada
- Promotion: CyberFight
- Brand: Pro Wrestling Noah
- Date: March 9, 2023
- City: Tokyo, Japan
- Venue: Korakuen Hall
- Attendance: 1,310
- Tagline: Stay Alive

Pay-per-view chronology
← Previous; Keiji Muto Grand Final Pro-Wrestling "Last-Love"	Next → Great Voyage in Yokohama 2023

The second night from March 9 show concentrated on the retirement match of Daisuke Harada. On March 2, 2023, Pro Wrestling Noah announced that he was forced to end his career due to sustaining serious injuries.

=== Preliminary matches ===
Two preshow matches have been broadcast on Noah's YouTube channel. In the first one, Shuji Kondo, Tadasuke and Hajime Ohara picked up a win over Kinya Okada, Yasutaka Yano and Daishi Ozawa in six-man tag team action. The second one portraited the confrontation between Super Crazy, Extreme Tiger and Lanzeloth, and Yo-Hey, Seiki Yoshioka and Alejandro, bout solded with the victory of the preceding team. The first match of the main card saw a one-minute exhibition match which represented Daisuke Harada's retirement match in which he went into a draw against his "Momo No Seishun Tag" partner Atsushi Kotoge. Next up, Takashi Sugiura, Kazuyuki Fujita and Hideki Suzuki outmatched the team of Naomichi Marufuji, Masaaki Mochizuki and Shuhei Taniguchi. The fifth nout saw Kenoh, Katsuhiko Nakajima and Manabu Soya defeating Yoshiki Inamura and the GHC Tag Team Champions Masa Kitamiya and Daiki Inaba. The preceding team picked up the victory. After the bout concluded, All Japan Pro Wrestling's reigning World Tag Team Champions Yuma Aoyagi and Takuya Nomura laid a challenge for Kenoh and Soya for the second night of AJPW's Dream Power Series event from March 21, 2023. Next up, one half of the reigning GHC Junior Heavyweight Tag Team Champions Eita defeated Hayata as a result of a disqualification after the latter attacked him with the title belt during match. In the seventh match, Chris Ridgeway defeated the other GHC Junior Heavyweight Tag Team Champion Yoshinari Ogawa by submission. The sixth and seventh matches occurred as a build-up for Eita and Ogawa's junior title defense over Hayata and Ridgeway from Great Voyage in Yokohama 2023. In the semi main event, Jake Lee and Anthony Greene picked up a win over Kaito Kiyomiya and Atsushi Kotoge. The bout also took part in the build-up for the GHC Heavyweight Championship match between Kiyomiya and Lee from Great Voyage.

=== Main event ===
In the main event of the show, Amakusa defeated Hi69 and secured the second consecutive defense of the GHC Junior Heavyweight Championship in that respective reign.

No.	Results	Stipulations	Times
1^{P}	Kongo (Shuji Kondo, Tadasuke and Hajime Ohara) defeated Kinya Okada, Yasutaka Yano and Taishi Ozawa	Six-man tag team match	5:00
2^{P}	Super Crazy, Extreme Tiger and Lanzeloth defeated Yo-Hey, Seiki Yoshioka and Alejandro	Six-man tag team match	6:23
3	Daisuke Harada vs. Atsushi Kotoge ended in a time-limit draw	One-minute exhibition match (Note: This was Harada's special retirement match.)	1:00
4	Sugiura-gun (Takashi Sugiura, Kazuyuki Fujita and Hideki Suzuki) defeated Naomichi Marufuji, Masaaki Mochizuki and Shuhei Taniguchi	Six-man tag team match	12:59
5	Kongo (Kenoh, Katsuhiko Nakajima and Manabu Soya) defeated Masa Kitamiya, Daiki Inaba and Yoshiki Inamura	Six-man tag team match	12:11
6	Eita defeated Hayata by disqualification	Singles match	3:47
7	Chris Ridgeway defeated Yoshinari Ogawa by submission	Singles match	10:20
8	Good Looking Guys (Jake Lee and Anthony Greene) defeated Kaito Kiyomiya and Atsushi Kotoge	Tag team match	13:47
9	Amakusa (c) defeated Hi69	Singles match for the GHC Junior Heavyweight Championship	12:15
(c) / – the champion(s) heading into the match; P / – the match was broadcast on the pre-show
