= Noah Green Journey in Sendai 2023 =

2023 Pro Wrestling Noah event

NOAH Green Journey in Sendai 2023
- Promotional poster featuring various wrestlers
- Promotion: CyberFight
- Brand: Pro Wrestling Noah
- Date: April 16, 2023
- City: Sendai, Japan
- Venue: Xebio Arena Sendai
- Attendance: 1,277

Pay-per-view chronology
← Previous; Great Voyage in Yokohama 2023	Next → Majestic 2023

NOAH Green Journey in Sendai 2023 was a professional wrestling event promoted by CyberFight's sub-brand Pro Wrestling Noah. It took place on April 16, 2023, in Sendai, Japan, at the Xebio Arena Sendai. The event aired on CyberAgent's AbemaTV online linear television service and CyberFight's streaming service Wrestle Universe.

Ten matches were contested at the event, including three on the pre-show, and all five of Noah's championships were on the line. The main event saw Jake Lee defeat Katsuhiko Nakajima to retain the GHC Heavyweight Championship. Other top matches included Hayata defeating Amakusa to win the GHC Junior Heavyweight Championship, Good Looking Guys (Tadasuke and Yo-Hey) defeated Yoshinari Ogawa and Eita to win the GHC Junior Heavyweight Tag Team Championship, and Takashi Sugiura and Shuhei Taniguchi defeated Masa Kitamiya and Daiki Inaba to win the GHC Tag Team Championship.

== Storylines ==
The event featured professional wrestling matches that involve different wrestlers from pre-existing scripted feuds and storylines. Wrestlers portray villains, heroes, or less distinguishable characters in scripted events that build tension and culminate in a wrestling match or series of matches.

=== Event ===
The event started with three preshow bouts broadcast live on Noah's YouTube channel. The first one was the confrontation between Daishi Ozawa and Anthony Greene solded with the victory of the latter. Next up, Hideki Suzuki, Timothy Thatcher and Saxon Huxley picked up a victory over Yoshiki Inamura, Kinya Okada and Sean Legacy in six-man tag team action. In the third bout, Maya Yukihi defeated Sumire Natsu by submission. Go Shiozaki made an appearance, announcing he was returning from injury, and competing at Majestic 2023. The first main event bout saw Kenoh, Jinsei Shinzaki, Shuji Kondo, Hajime Ohara and Hi69 outmatching Naomichi Marufuji, Kaito Kiyomiya, Ninja Mack, Atsushi Kotoge and Seiki Yoshioka. The fifth match saw the Six-man tag team match in which Dralístico, Alejandro and Dragon Bane challenged Extreme Tiger, Lanzeloth and Alpha Wolf. The contest however went down to a 3-on-2 handicap match after Extreme Tiger was legitimately knocked out midmatch and was unable to furtherly compete. In the sixth match, Takashi Sugiura and Shuhei Taniguchi defeated Masa Kitamiya and Daiki Inaba to capture the GHC Tag Team Championship. During the event, after Sugiura and Taniguchi won the GHC Tag Team Championship, Sugiura stated that Sugiura-gun was not working and as such announced the disbanding of the stable. Next up, Tadasuke and Yo-Hey defeated Yoshinari Ogawa and Eita to win the GHC Junior Heavyweight Tag Team Championship. After the match concluded, Ogawa and Eita fought each other, hinting the disband of their tag team. In the eighth bout, El Hijo de Dr. Wagner Jr. defeated Jack Morris to secure the third consecutive defense of the GHC National Championship. In the semi main event, Hayata defeated Amakusa to capture the GHC Junior Heavyweight Championship.

In the main event, Jake Lee defeated Katsuhiko Nakajima to secure his first defense of the GHC Heavyweight Championship in that respective reign. After the bout concluded, Lee received a title challenge from Naomichi Marufuji.

== Results ==
No.	Results	Stipulations	Times
1^{P}	Anthony Greene defeated Taishi Ozawa (Note: Yasutaka Yano was scheduled to face Ozawa but was pulled out of the card.)	Singles match	4:59
2^{P}	Sugiura-gun (Hideki Suzuki, Timothy Thatcher and Saxon Huxley) defeated Yoshiki Inamura, Kinya Okada and Sean Legacy	Six-man tag team match	8:13
3^{P}	Maya Yukihi defeated Sumire Natsu by submission	Singles match	6:31
4	Kongo (Kenoh, Jinsei Shinzaki, Shuji Kondo, Hajime Ohara and Hi69) defeated Naomichi Marufuji, Kaito Kiyomiya, Ninja Mack, Atsushi Kotoge and Seiki Yoshioka	Ten-man tag team match	14:21
5	Dralístico, Alejandro and Dragón Bane defeated Lanzeloth and Alpha Wolf by submission	3-on-2 handicap match	7:41
6	Takashi Sugiura and Shuhei Taniguchi defeated Masa Kitamiya and Daiki Inaba (c)	Tag team match for the GHC Tag Team Championship	15:23
7	Good Looking Guys (Tadasuke and Yo-Hey) defeated Yoshinari Ogawa and Eita (c)	Tag team match for the GHC Junior Heavyweight Tag Team Championship	13:34
8	El Hijo de Dr. Wagner Jr. (c) defeated Jack Morris	Singles match for the GHC National Championship	23:04
9	Hayata defeated Amakusa (c)	Singles match for the GHC Junior Heavyweight Championship	13:04
10	Jake Lee (c) defeated Katsuhiko Nakajima	Singles match for the GHC Heavyweight Championship	22:58
(c) / – the champion(s) heading into the match; P / – the match was broadcast on the pre-show
