= Noah The Glory 2021 =

2021 Pro Wrestling Noah event

NOAH The Glory 2021
- Promotional poster featuring Takashi Sugiura
- Promotion: CyberFight
- Brand: Pro Wrestling Noah
- Date: April 29, 2021
- City: Nagoya, Japan
- Venue: Nagoya Congress Center
- Attendance: 718

Pay-per-view chronology
← Previous; The Infinity 2021	Next → Mitsuharu Misawa Memorial 2021

NOAH The Glory 2021 was a professional wrestling event promoted by CyberFight's sub-brand Pro Wrestling Noah took place on April 29, 2021, in Nagoya, Japan, at the Nagoya Congress Center. The event aired on CyberAgent's AbemaTV online linear television service, CyberFight's streaming service Wrestle Universe and FITE TV.

Eight matches were contested at the event, and three of Noah's five championships were on the line. The main event saw Keiji Muto defeat Masa Kitamiya to retain the GHC Heavyweight Championship. In another prominent match, Takashi Sugiura defeated Kazuyuki Fujita to win the GHC National Championship.

== Background ==
=== Storylines ===
The event featured eight professional wrestling matches that resulted from scripted storylines, where wrestlers portrayed villains, heroes, or less distinguishable characters in the scripted events that built tension and culminated in a wrestling match or series of matches.

=== Event ===
The event started with the six-man tag team competition confrontation between Momo No Seishun Tag (Atsushi Kotoge and Daisuke Harada) and Yasutaka Yano, and Full Throttle (Hajime Ohara, Seiki Yoshioka and Yo-Hey), solded with the victory of the latter team. In the second bout, Katsuhiko Nakajima and Nio picked up a victory over Akitoshi Saito and Junta Miyawaki in tag team action. The third match saw Kotaro Suzuki and Yuya Susumu going into a draw after a double pinfall. Next up, Kazunari Murakami, Kazushi Sakuraba and Kendo Kashin defeated Masao Inoue, Mohammed Yone and Shuhei Taniguchi in six-man tag team competition. Next up, Hayata and Yoshinari Ogawa defeated Ikuto Hidaka and Nosawa Rongai to secure the fifth consecutive defense of the GHC Junior Heavyweight Tag Team Championship in that respective reign. In the sixth bout, Masaaki Mochizuki, Masato Tanaka and Naomichi Marufuji defeated Kaito Kiyomiya, Kinya Okada and Yoshiki Inamura in six-man tag team competition. In the semi main event, Takashi Sugiura defeated Kazuyuki Fujita to win the GHC National Championship, ending the latter's reign at 39 days and no defenses. After the bout ended, Kazushi Sakuraba stepped up to challenge Sugiura for the title.

In the main event, Keiji Muto defeated Masa Kitamiya to secure the second defense of the GHC Heavyweight Championship in that respective reign.

== Results ==
No.	Results	Stipulations	Times
1	Full Throttle (Hajime Ohara, Seiki Yoshioka and Yo-Hey) defeated Momo No Seishun Tag (Atsushi Kotoge and Daisuke Harada) and Yasutaka Yano by pinfall	Six-man tag team match	11:54
2	Kongo (Katsuhiko Nakajima and Nio) defeated Akitoshi Saito and Junta Miyawaki by pinfall	Tag team match	11:49
3	Kotaro Suzuki vs. Yuya Susumu ended in a double pinfall	Singles match	11:02
4	Sugiura-gun (Kazunari Murakami, Kazushi Sakuraba and Kendo Kashin) defeated Funky Express (Masao Inoue, Mohammed Yone and Shuhei Taniguchi) by pinfall	Six-man tag team match	10:48
5	Stinger (Hayata and Yoshinari Ogawa) (c) defeated Los Perros del Mal de Japón (Ikuto Hidaka and Nosawa Rongai) by pinfall	Tag team match for the GHC Junior Heavyweight Tag Team Championship	18:36
6	M's Alliance (Masaaki Mochizuki, Masato Tanaka and Naomichi Marufuji) defeated Kaito Kiyomiya, Kinya Okada and Yoshiki Inamura by pinfall	Six-man tag team match	17:36
7	Takashi Sugiura defeated Kazuyuki Fujita (c) by pinfall	Singles match for the GHC National Championship	18:08
8	Keiji Muto (c) defeated Masa Kitamiya by pinfall	Singles match for the GHC Heavyweight Championship	22:53
(c) / – the champion(s) heading into the match
