= Sugiura-gun =

Professional wrestling stable

- Current logo of the stable (2019–present)

Stable
- Members: See below
- Debut: March 10, 2019
- Disbanded: April 16, 2023
- Years active: 2019–2023

Sugiura-gun (杉浦軍, Sugiura-gun) was a Japanese professional wrestling stable, based in the Pro Wrestling Noah (Noah) promotion. It was founded by Takashi Sugiura in 2019 and led by him until early 2023.

== History ==
=== Formation ===
Takashi Sugiura and Kazma Sakamoto shared a feud after the events from the fourth night of the NOAH Navigation For Progress 2019 from February 24, where Sakamoto teamed up with "Hooligans" stablemates Cody Hall, Maybach Taniguchi, Mitsuya Nagai and Yuji Hino to face the team of Sugiura, Akitoshi Saito, Kinya Okada, Masao Inoue and Yoshiki Inamura in a loser unit must disband match. The bout concluded after Sugiura pinned Sakamoto, attracting the disbanding of "Hooligans" in the process. Sakamoto wanted to take revenge on Sugiura so at NOAH Great Voyage In Yokohama, an even promoted on March 10, 2019, they faced each other in a singles match, bout which solded with the victory of Sugiura. Sakamoto however brought Nosawa Rongai to ringside with the latter not getting involved in their match. After the bout concluded, all three of them shook hands and aligned each other to found the unit which was later announced to go under the name of "Sugiura-gun".

=== Under Takashi Sugiura's leadership (2019–2023) ===
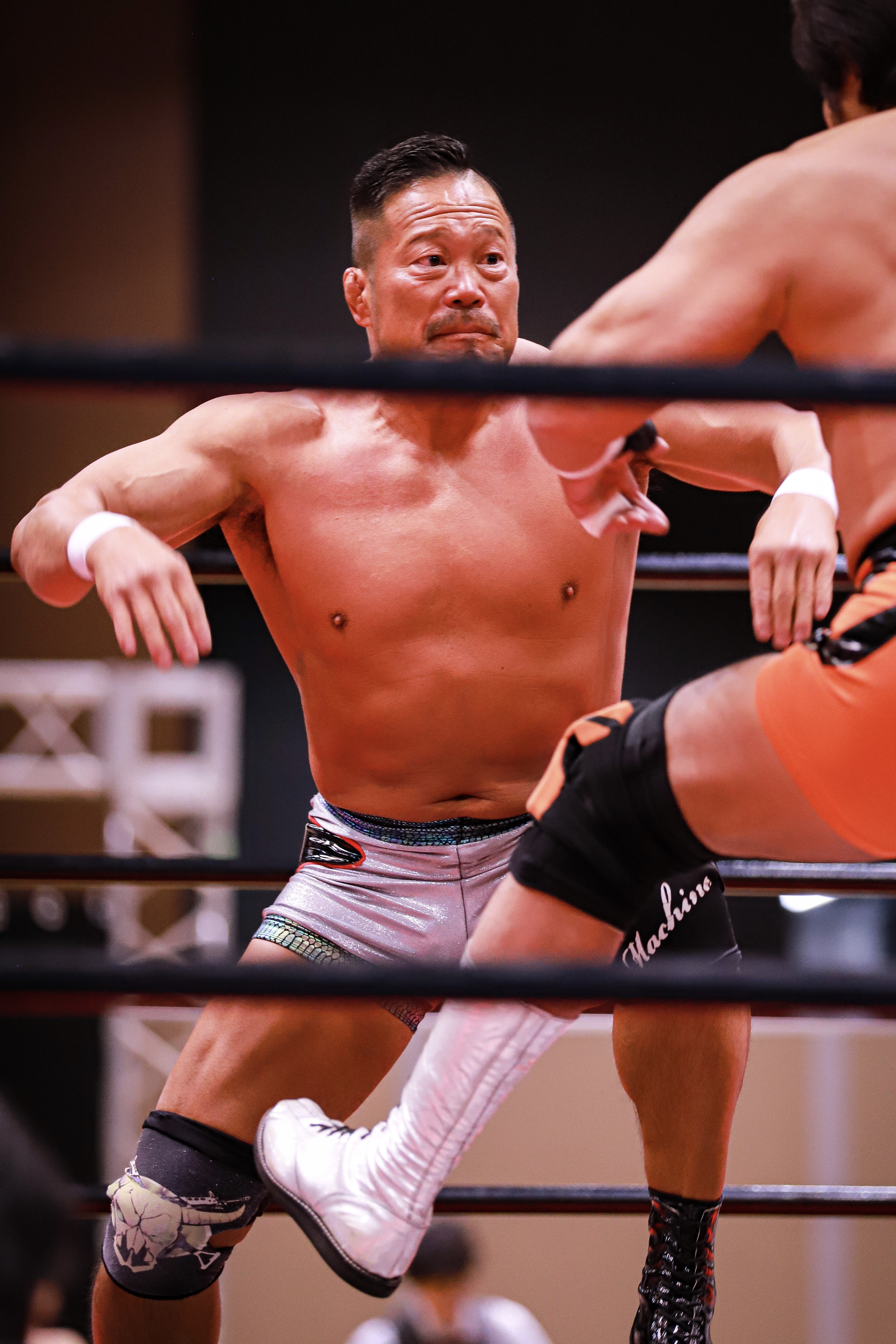
First and only leader of the stable, Takashi Sugiura.

As Sugiura was appointed as the leader of the unit, he worked to help raise the team's notoriety in the promotion. At NOAH N-1 Victory 2019 on November 2, he defeated Michael Elgin to become the first-ever GHC National Champion. Earlier in the year, he made it to the finals of the 2019 edition of the N-1 Victory where he fell short to Kenoh. On the finals of the 2019 Global Junior Heavyweight Tag League, Takashi Sugiura and Kazma Sakamoto defeated AXIZ (Go Shiozaki and Katsuhiko Nakajima) to win the GHC Tag Team Championship.

At Noah The Glory 2021 on April 29, Kazunari Murakami, Kazushi Sakuraba and Kendo Kashin) defeated Funky Express (Masao Inoue, Mohammed Yone and Shuhei Taniguchi). At Noah Mitsuharu Misawa Memorial 2021 on May 31, Takashi Sugiura defeated stablemate Kazushi Sakuraba to retain the GHC National Championship. At CyberFight Festival 2021 on June 6, Takashi Sugiura and Kazushi Sakuraba defeated Danshoku Dino and Super Sasadango Machine. At Noah Cross Over in Sendai 2021 on July11, Kazushi Sakuraba, Kazuyuki Fujita and Kendo Kashin defeated Funky Express (Akitoshi Saito, King Tany and Mohammed Yone). At Noah Cross Over in Hiroshima 2021 on August 1, Kazuyuki Fujita, Kendo Kashin and Takashi Sugiura defeated Kongo (Hao, Katsuhiko Nakajima and Nio) in six-man tag team competition. At Noah Grand Square 2021 on October 10, Kazuyuki Fujita, Kendo Kashin and Takashi Sugiura fell short to M's Alliance (Masaaki Mochizuki, Masakatsu Funaki and Masato Tanaka). At Noah Demolition Stage 2021 on November 13, Kazuyuki Fujita defeated Yoshiki Inamura, and Kazushi Sakuraba, Kendo Kashin and Takashi Sugiura fell short to Funky Express (Akitoshi Saito, King Tany and Mohammed Yone). At Noah The Best 2021 on November 28, Kazushi Sakuraba, Kazuyuki Fujita and Takashi Sugiura fell short to M's Alliance (Keiji Muto, Masato Tanaka and Naomichi Marufuji) in six-man tag team competition.

At Noah The New Year 2022 on January 1, Kazuyuki Fujita and Kendo Kashin defeated Ikuto Hidaka and Masakatsu Funaki in tag team action, and Kazushi Sakuraba and Takashi Sugiura teamed up with Kenta to defeat Daiki Inaba, Masa Kitamiya and Yoshiki Inamura. At Noah Bumper Crop 2022 In Sendai on January 16, Kazushi Sakuraba, Kazuyuki Fujita, Kendo Kashin and Takashi Sugiura defeated Funky Express (King Tany and Mohammed Yone), Go Shiozaki and Masakatsu Funaki. At Noah Higher Ground 2022 on January 22, Kazushi Sakuraba and Takashi Sugiura fell short to M's Alliance (Masato Tanaka and Naomichi Marufuji). At Noah Gain Control 2022 In Nagoya on February 23, Kendo Kashin fought Masato Tanaka in a double count-out, Takashi Sugiura teamed up with Naomichi Marufuji to defeat Masa Kitamiya and Yoshiki Inamura, and Kazuyuki Fujita defeated Katsuhiko Nakajima to win the GHC Heavyweight Championship. At Noah Great Voyage in Fukuoka 2022 on March 21, Hideki Suzuki, Kazushi Sakuraba, Kendo Kashin and Takashi Sugiura defeated Kongo (Katsuhiko Nakajima, Kenoh, Manabu Soya and Masakatsu Funaki), and Kazuyuki Fujita defended the GHC Heavyweight Championship against Masato Tanaka. On the second night of Noah Majestic 2022 from April 30, Kazushi Sakuraba and Kendo Kashin defeated Don Fujii and Masaaki Mochizuki, El Hijo del Dr. Wagner Jr. and René Duprée defeated Daiki Inaba and Masato Tanaka, and Hideki Suzuki and Takashi Sugiura successfully defended the GHC Tag Team Championship against Kongo (Katsuhiko Nakajima and Kenoh). At Noah Dream On Final 2022 on May 21, Kazuyuki Fujita defeated Kinya Okada, Hideki Suzuki and Takashi Sugiura teamed up with Masaaki Mochizuki to defeat Kongo (Katsuhiko Nakajima, Manabu Soya and Masakatsu Funaki), and El Hijo del Dr. Wagner Jr. and René Duprée dropped the GHC Tag Team Championship to Masa Kitamiya and Michael Elgin. At CyberFight Festival 2022 on June 12, El Hijo de Dr. Wagner Jr., René Duprée and Timothy Thatcher teamed up with Michael Elgin and Simon Gotch to defeat Takashi Sugiura, Kazuyuki Fujita, Masa Kitamiya, Daiki Inaba and Shuhei Taniguchi in five-man tag team action. At Noah Destination 2022 on July 16, El Hijo del Dr. Wagner Jr. and René Duprée teamed up with Anthony Greene, Simon Gotch and Stallion Rogers to defeat Daiki Inaba, Kazushi Sakuraba, Kinya Okada, Masaaki Mochizuki and Shuhei Taniguchi, Kazuyuki Fujita and Takashi Sugiura teamed up with Go Shiozaki to defeat Kongo (Katsuhiko Nakajima, Manabu Soya and Masakatsu Funaki), Hideki Suzuki and Timothy Thatcher defeated The Tough (Masa Kitamiya and Yoshiki Inamura). At Noah Departure 2022 on August 5, Takashi Sugiura teamed up with Go Shiozaki and Naomichi Marufuji to defeat Daiki Inaba, Masato Tanaka and Satoshi Kojima. At Noah Grand Ship In Nagoya 2022 on September 25, Hideki Suzuki and Timothy Thatcher dropped the GHC Tag Team Championship to Satoshi Kojima and Takashi Sugiura. At Noah Ariake Triumph 2022 on October 30, El Hijo del Dr. Wagner Jr. and Hideki Suzuki defeated Masa Kitamiya and Masato Tanaka, Kazushi Sakuraba unsuccessfully challenged Masakatsu Funaki for the GHC National Championship, Satoshi Kojima and Takashi Sugiura successfully defended the GHC Tag Team Championship against Kongo (Katsuhiko Nakajima and Kenoh) and Kazuyuki Fujita unsuccessfully challenged Kaito Kiyomiya for the GHC Heavyweight Championship. At Noah Global Honored Crown 2022 on November 10, Satoshi Kojima and Takashi Sugiura successfully defended the GHC Tag Team Championship against Funky Express (Akitoshi Saito and Mohammed Yone), El Hijo del Dr. Wagner Jr. defeated Masakatsu Funaki to win the GHC National Championship, and Timothy Thatcher unsuccessfully challenged Kaito Kiyomiya for the GHC Heavyweight Championship. At Noah The Best 2022 on November 23, Kazuyuki Fujita, Takashi Sugiura and Timothy Thatcher fell short against Masaaki Mochizuki, Masato Tanaka and Naomichi Marufuji, and El Hijo del Dr. Wagner Jr. successfully defended the GHC National Championship against Yoshiki Inamura.

At Noah The New Year 2023 on January 1, Kazuyuki Fujita and Kendo Kashin teamed up with Nosawa Rongai and Hiroshi Hase to defeat Kongo (Katsuhiko Nakajima, Masakatsu Funaki, Manabu Soya and Hajime Ohara) and Timothy Thatcher fell short to Jack Morris. At The Great Muta Final "Bye-Bye" on January 22, Timothy Thatcher defeated Masaaki Mochizuki, Kazushi Sakuraba defeated Hideki Suzuki by referee stoppage, and El Hijo de Dr. Wagner Jr. and Takashi Sugiura teamed up with Kaito Kiyomiya and Satoshi Kojima to defeat Kongo (Kenoh, Katsuhiko Nakajima, Masakatsu Funaki and Manabu Soya). On the first night of the Noah Star Navigation 2023 from February 5, Timothy Thatcher and Hideki Suzuki defeated Masaaki Mochizuki and Shuhei Taniguchi in tag team competition. At Noah Great Voyage in Osaka 2023 on February 12, Timothy Thatcher, Kazuyuki Fujita and Hideki Suzuki defeated Masato Tanaka, Masaaki Mochizuki and Yoshiki Inamura in six-man tag team action, and TakaKoji (Takashi Sugiura and Satoshi Kojima) dropped the GHC Tag Team Championship against Masa Kitamiya and Daiki Inaba. At Keiji Muto Grand Final Pro-Wrestling "Last" Love on February 21, 2023, Takashi Sugiura, Satoshi Kojima and Timothy Thatcher fell short to Jake Lee, Jack Morris and Anthony Greene in six-man tag team action. At Noah Great Voyage in Yokohama 2023 on March 19, Sugiura fell short to Shuhei Taniguchi in singles competition.

==== Stable's dissolution (April 2023) ====
At Noah Green Journey in Sendai 2023 on April 16, Hideki Suzuki, Timothy Thatcher and Saxon Huxley defeated Yoshiki Inamura, Kinya Okada and Sean Legacy in six-man tag team competition, and Takashi Sugiura and Shuhei Taniguchi defeated Masa Kitamiya and Daiki Inaba to capture the GHC Tag Team Championship. After the bout concluded, Sugiura stated that Sugiura-gun was not working and as such announced the disbanding of the stable. Six days later, Suzuki, Thatcher and Huxley formed the stable of "Real".

==== New Japan Pro Wrestling (2022–2023) ====
Due to Pro Wrestling Noah sharing a business partnership with New Japan Pro Wrestling, various members of the stable participated in the latter's biggest yearly event, the Wrestle Kingdom, usually on the second or third night dedicated to inter-promotional prizeless matches. At Wrestle Kingdom 16 on January 8, 2022, Takashi Sugiura and Kazushi Sakuraba teamed up with Toru Yano to defeat Suzuki-gun (Taichi, Minoru Suzuki and Taka Michinoku). At Wrestle Kingdom 17 on January 21, Takashi Sugiura teamed up with Satoshi Kojima, Toru Yano and Hiroshi Tanahashi to defeat Bullet Club (El Phantasmo, Kenta and Gedo) and Naomichi Marufuji.

== Members ==
*	Founding member
I	Leader

Member		Joined	Left
Dick Togo		January 5, 2020	May 9, 2020
Hideki Sekine		March 22, 2020	May 9, 2020
Kazma Sakamoto	*	March 10, 2019	May 9, 2020
Hajime Ohara		May 2, 2019	May 10, 2020
Seiki Yoshioka		April 18, 2020	May 10, 2020
Kaz Hayashi		June 10, 2020	December 30, 2020
Nosawa Rongai	*	March 10, 2019	June 27, 2021
Kazunari Murakami		December 26, 2020	June 20, 2021
Daisuke Nakamura		November 8, 2020	December 27, 2021
Kenta		December 27, 2021	January 5, 2022
Takashi Sugiura	I*	March 10, 2019	April 16, 2023
Hideki Suzuki		April 17, 2019; February 23, 2022	December 29, 2020; April 16, 2023
Kazushi Sakuraba		July 28, 2019	April 16, 2023
El Hijo de Dr. Wagner Jr.		August 18, 2019	April 16, 2023
Kazuyuki Fujita		October 3, 2019	April 16, 2023
René Duprée		March 29, 2020	April 16, 2023
Kendo Kashin		June 10, 2020	April 16, 2023
Timothy Thatcher		June 7, 2022	April 16, 2023
Saxon Huxley		March 17, 2023	April 16, 2023

== Championships and accomplishments ==
- Pro Wrestling Noah
  - GHC Heavyweight Championship (2 times) – Fujita (1) and Wagner Jr. (1)
  - GHC National Championship (3 times) – Sugiura (2) and Wagner Jr. (1)
  - GHC Tag Team Championship (8 times) – Sugiura and Sakamoto (1), Wagner Jr. and Duprée (2), Sugiura and Sakuraba (1), Sugiura and Suzuki (1), Suzuki and Thatcher (1), Sugiura and Kojima (1), Thatcher and Huxley (1)
  - Global Tag League
    - (2019) – Sugiura and Sakamoto
    - (2020) – Wagner Jr. and Duprée
- Pro Wrestling Illustrated
  - Ranked Takashi Sugiura No. 67 of the top 500 singles wrestlers in the PWI 500 in 2021
  - Ranked El Hijo de Dr. Wagner Jr. No. 117 of the top 500 singles wrestlers in the PWI 500 in 2023
  - Ranked Kazuyuki Fujita No. 117 of the top 500 singles wrestlers in the PWI 500 in 2022
  - Ranked Hideki Suzuki No. 150 of the top 500 singles wrestlers in the PWI 500 in 2019
  - Ranked Timothy Thatcher No. 265 of the top 500 singles wrestlers in the PWI 500 in 2023
- Pro Wrestling Zero1
  - World Heavyeight Championship (1 time) – Sugiura
- Tokyo Sports Puroresu Awards
  - Best Tag Team Award – Sugiura and Sakuraba (2020)
