= Anthony Greene =

American professional wrestler (born 1993)

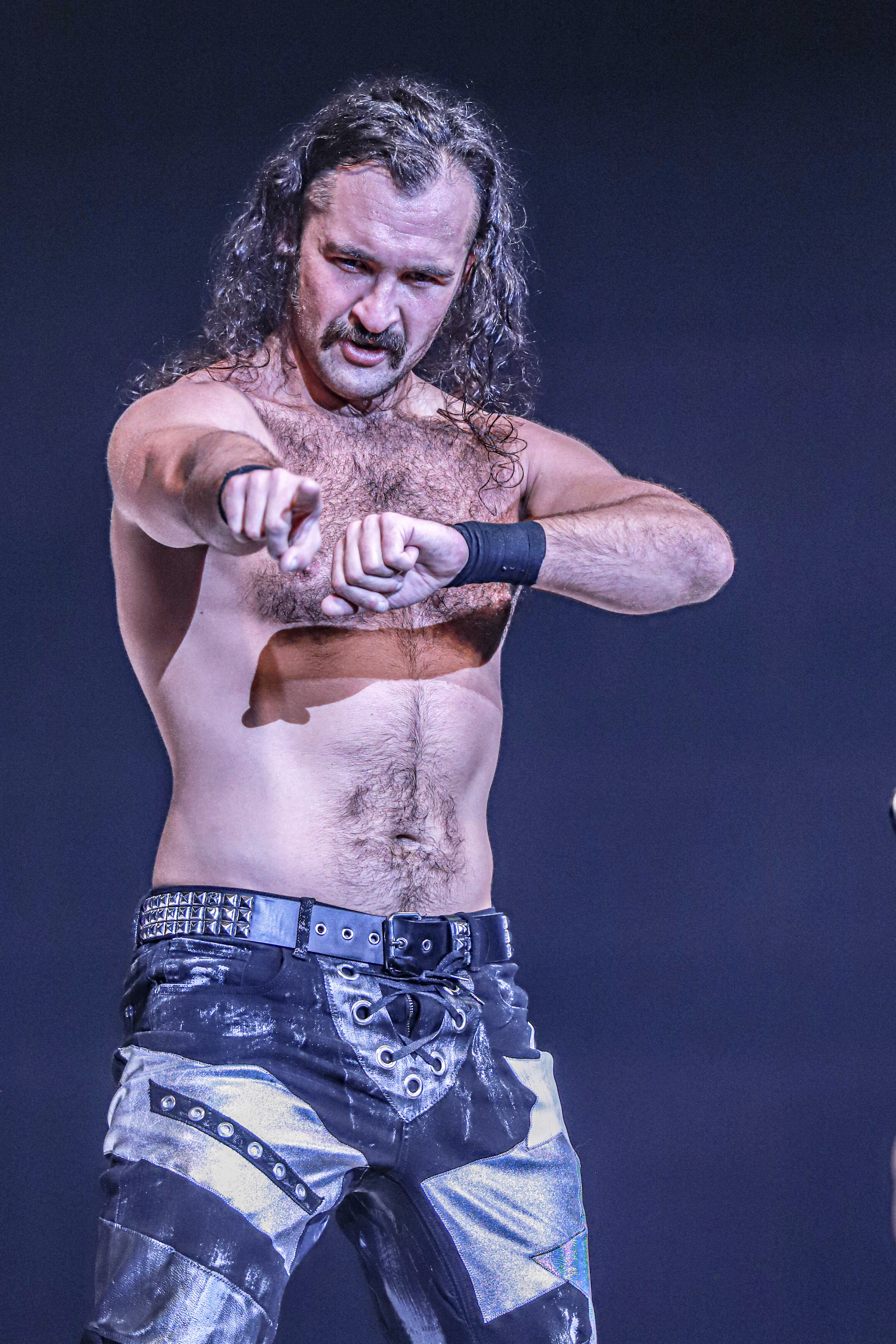
- Greene in January 2023

Personal information
- Born: August 23, 1993 (age 33) Randolph, Massachusetts, U.S.

Professional wrestling career
- Ring name(s): Anthony Greene; AG Saint; August Grey; Josiah Matthews; Retro AG
- Billed height: 188 cm (6 ft 2 in)
- Billed weight: 87 kg (192 lb)
- Trained by: Brian Fury; Ryan Waters; Spike Dudley; WWE Performance Center
- Debut: 2012

Anthony Greene (born August 23, 1993) is an American professional wrestler. He is performing in the Japanese promotion Pro Wrestling Noah as a freelancer. He is a former member of the Good Looking Guys stable. He also known for his time in WWE where he mainly performed in the 205 Live brand under the ring name of August Grey.

== Professional wrestling career ==
=== American independent scene (2012–present) ===
==== Northeast Championship Wrestling (2012–2021) ====
Greene made his professional wrestling debut in Northeast Championship Wrestling, at NCW Meltdown, an event promoted on July 14, 2012, where he defeated Jack Krueger in singles competition in a match with J. T. Dunn serving as special guest referee. He won two of the promotion's titles, the NCW Tag Team Championship once with Mike Paiva and the NCW Heavyweight Championship. He seldomly took part in various match gimmicks such as Rumble matches. He competed in one of these bouts at NCW Big City Rumble 2014 on August 8. The match was won by GA West.

==== Other promotions ====
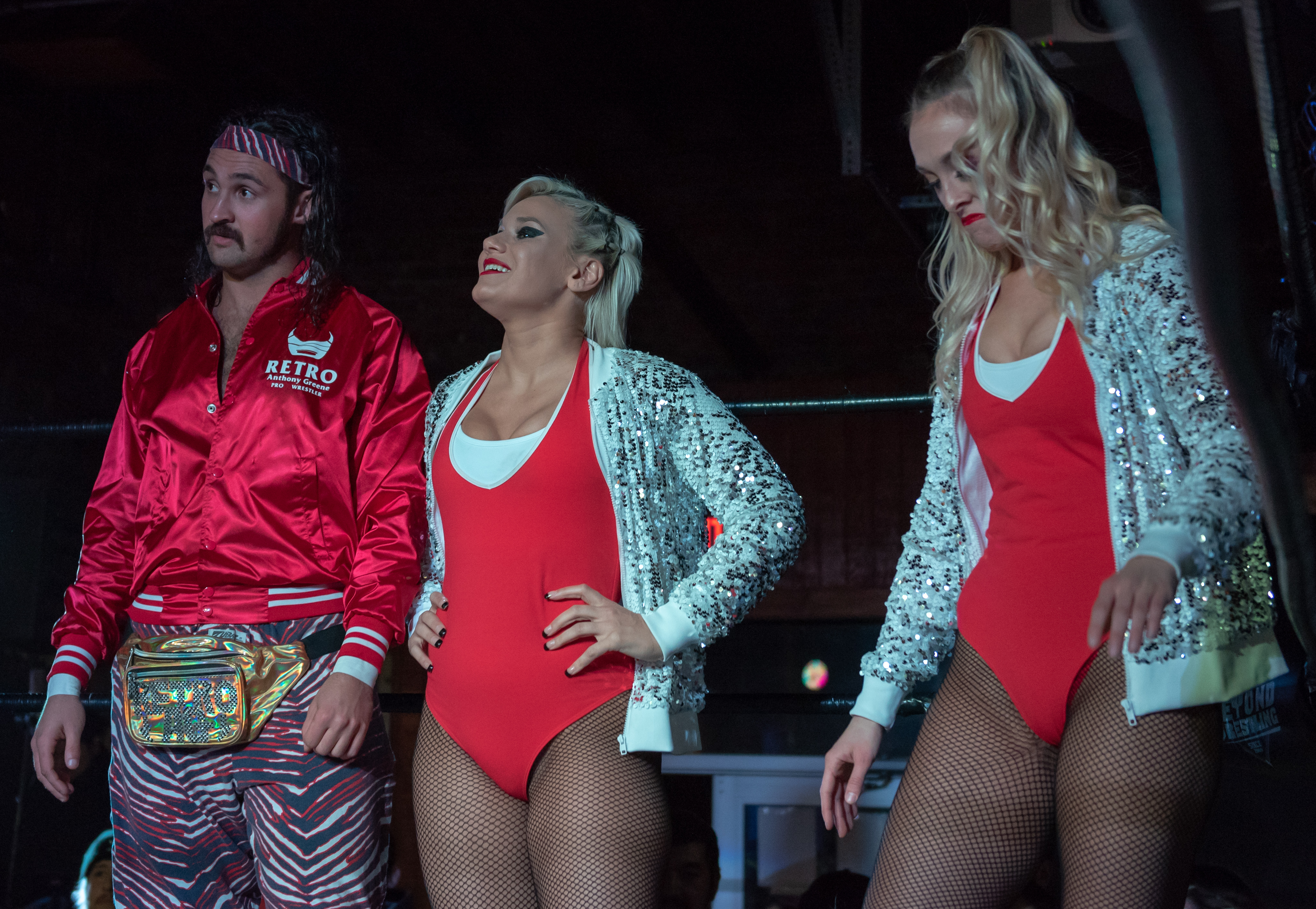
Greene & the Platinum Hunnies (Angel Sinclair and Ava Everett) in 2019

Due to mainly competing as a freelancer, Greene is known for working in various promotion of the American independent scene. Greene worked for Tommy Dreamer's promotion of House of Hardcore in 2014, getting booked for a few shows. At Chikara's 2018 edition of the Young Lions Cup from March 17, Greene competed in a first-round four-way match won by Cajun Crawdad and also involving Gabby Ortiz and Super Beetle. On the second night of Ring of Honor and New Japan Pro Wrestling co-hosted event of Global Wars 2018, Greene teamed up with Brad Hollister and Brad Johnson and fell short to Shinobi Shadow Squad (Cheeseburger, Eli Isom and Ryan Nova) in a dark match. At EVOLVE 145, an event promoted by Evolve on February 29, 2020, Greene unsuccessfully challenged Josh Briggs for the Evolve Championship. Greene also collaborated with other promotions from under WWNLive's jurisdiction such as Full Impact Pro. He won the FIP Florida Heritage Championship at WWN Supershow: Battle Of The Belts on November 14, 2021, by defeating Troy Hollywood. He competed at Impact Wrestling #961 episode from December 10, 2022, where he fell short to Mike Bailey.

=== Chaotic Wrestling (2013–2019) ===
Greene is best known for his time in Chaotic Wrestling. During his ten-year plus tenure with the company, he won all the eligible titles promoted by it (excepting the Television and Light Heavyweight titles) which were short lived). The first championship he won was the Chaotic Wrestling Tag Team Championship, which he accomplished alongside his "The Cam-An Connection" tag team partner Cam Zagami by defeating freebird champions The Mill City Hooligans (Bryan Logan, Chase Del Monte and Matt Logan) at Cold Fury 16: Unstoppable on March 17, 2017. The second title he won was the New England Championship, which he accomplished at a house show promoted on August 3, 2018. To complete the Triple Crown task, Greene won the Heavyweight title on July 19, 2019, at CW Elevated by defeating Christian Casanova.

=== Combat Zone Wrestling (2017–2020) ===
Greene shared a three-year tenure with the hardcore wrestling promotion Combat Zone Wrestling. He made his first appearance at CZW Dojo Wars #154 on November 29, 2017, where he unsuccessfully challenged Mike Del for the CZW Medal of Valor Championship. Greene is known for competing in various of the promotion's signature events. One of them is CZW Cage of Death, in which he made his first appearance at the XX edition from December 9, 2018, where he picked up a victory over David Starr. He also competed at the XXI edition, the last before the closure of the series from December 14, 2019, where he teamed up with Ava Everett to defeat Alex Reynolds and John Sterling in an interdenger tag team match. As for the CZW Best of the Best, Greene made his only appearance at Best of the Best 18 from April 13, 2019, where he competed twice. First in a Best of the Best 18 quarterfinal 4-Way match for the CZW World Heavyweight Championship where he defeated B-Boy, Anthony Gangone, and reigning champion Mance Warner to win the title, and secondly, in singles competition against David Starr for the same title which he dropped to the latter.

=== WWE (2020–2021) ===
Greene shared a brief tenure with WWE where he competed in the 205 Live and NXT brands. He made his debut in 205 Live on October 16, 2020, where he fell short to Ariya Daivari in singles competition. He competed in the 2021 edition of the Dusty Rhodes Tag Team Classic, where he teamed up with Curt Stallion and fell short to Drake Maverick and Killian Dain in the first rounds from January 15. His most notable work in NXT took place at WarGames 2020 on December 6, where he teamed up with Curt Stallion and Ashante Adonis, falling short to Legado del Fantasma (Santos Escobar, Raul Mendoza and Joaquin Wilde). Greene was released by WWE on June 25, 2021.

=== All Elite Wrestling (2021–2022) ===
Shortly after his WWE release, Greene started competing in All Elite Wrestling, where he worked mainly on AEW Dark, but also appeared on AEW Dynamite on September 29, 2021.

=== Pro Wrestling Noah (2022–present) ===
Greene made his debut in Pro Wrestling Noah at NOAH Sunny Voyage 2022 on July 10, where he defeated Stallion Rogers. He soon started competing in various of the promotion's flagship events. His first presence at a major pay-per-view took place at Destination 2022 on July 16, where he teamed up with El Hijo del Dr. Wagner Jr., René Duprée, Simon Gotch and Stallion Rogers to defeat Daiki Inaba, Kazushi Sakuraba, Kinya Okada, Masaaki Mochizuki and Shuhei Taniguchi in a ten-man tag team match. At Departure 2022 on August 5, Greene teamed up with Stallion Rogers in a losing effort against Kongo (Katsuhiko Nakajima and Manabu Soya). After a three-month hiatus with the company, Greene returned on January 22, 2023, at The Great Muta Final "Bye-Bye", where he was presented as one of the newly founded "Good Looking Guys" stable members. He teamed up with Jake Lee and Jack Morris to defeat Masa Kitamiya, Daiki Inaba and Yoshiki Inamura. On the first night of the Star Navigation 2023 event from February 5, Greene teamed up with Lee and Morris again, this time coming up short against Kaito Kiyomiya, Naomichi Marafuji and Takashi Sugiura. On the second night from March 9, he teamed up with Lee to defeat Kaito Kiyomiya and Atsushi Kotoge. At Great Voyage in Osaka 2023 on February 12, Greene and Lee fell short to Kongo (Kenoh and Manabu Soya). At Keiji Muto Grand Final Pro-Wrestling "Last" Love on February 21, 2023, Greene teamed up with Jake Lee and Jack Morris to defeat Sugiura-gun (Takashi Sugiura, Timothy Thatcher) and Satoshi Kojima. At Great Voyage in Yokohama 2023 on March 19, Greene teamed up with Morris to defeat Naomichi Marufuji and El Hijo de Dr. Wagner Jr. At Green Journey in Sendai 2023 on April 16, Greene outmatched Daishi Ozawa in singles action.

Greene competed in one of the promotion's signature tournaments, the N-1 Victory in which he made his first appearance at the 2022 edition, placing himself in the Block B where he scored a total of two points after going against Hideki Suzuki, Kazuyuki Fujita, Kenoh, Go Shiozaki, El Hijo de Dr. Wagner Jr., Masato Tanaka and Masaaki Mochizuki. On September 24 at Grand Ship In Nagoya, Greene and Jack Morris defeated Real (Timothy Thatcher and Saxon Huxley) to win the GHC Tag Team Championship. They lost the titles to The New NOAH's Leaders (Naomichi Marufuji and Takashi Sugiura) in their ninth title defense on June 16 at Grand Ship In Yokohama, ending their reign at 266 days. Good Looking Guys disbanded on July 13 at Destination.

== Championships and accomplishments ==
- Alpha-1 Wrestling
  - A1 Outer Limits Championship (1 time)
  - A1 Tag Team Championship (1 time) - with Gregory Iron
- Chaotic Wrestling
  - Chaotic Wrestling Heavyweight Championship (1 time)
  - Chaotic Wrestling New England Championship (1 time)
  - Chaotic Wrestling Tag Team Championship (1 time) – with Cam Zagami
  - 13th Triple Crown Champion
- Combat Zone Wrestling
  - CZW World Heavyweight Championship (1 time)
- Full Impact Pro
  - FIP Florida Heritage Championship (1 time)
- Northeast Championship Wrestling
  - NCW Heavyweight Championship (1 time)
  - NCW Tag Team Championship (1 time) – with Mike Paiva
- Power League Wrestling
  - PLW Tag Team Championship (1 time) – with Rob Araujo
- Pro Wrestling Illustrated
  - Ranked No. 209 of the top 500 singles wrestlers in the PWI Men's 500 in 2020
- Pro Wrestling Noah
  - GHC Tag Team Championship (1 time) – with Jack Morris
- Xtreme Wrestling Alliance
  - XWA Tag Team Championship (1 time, inaugural) - with Ace Romero
- Wrestling Xtreme Mania
  - WXM World Tag Team Championship (1 time, inaugural) – with Baliyan Akki
