= Keiji Muto Grand Final Pro-Wrestling "Last" Love =

2023 Pro Wrestling Noah event

- Left: Promotional poster for Keiji Muto's retirement match featuring Muto; Right: Promotional poster for Nosawa Rongai's retirement match featuring Taiji Ishimori, Gedo, Rongai, Mazada, and Muto
- Promotion: CyberFight
- Brand: Pro Wrestling Noah
- Date: February 21, 2023
- City: Tokyo, Japan
- Venue: Tokyo Dome
- Attendance: 30,096
- Tagline(s): Hold Out; Nosawa Rongai Grand Final de Lucha

Pay-per-view chronology
← Previous; Great Voyage 2023 in Osaka	Next → Noah Star Navigation 2023

Keiji Muto Grand Final Pro-Wrestling "Last" Love: Hold Out was a professional wrestling event promoted by CyberFight's sub-brand Pro Wrestling Noah (Noah). It took place on February 21, 2023, in Tokyo, Japan, at the Tokyo Dome. The event aired on CyberAgent's AbemaTV online linear television service and CyberFight's streaming service Wrestle Universe. The event featured the retirement matches of Keiji Muto and saw the involvement of wrestlers from Noah's sister promotions Tokyo Joshi Pro-Wrestling and DDT Pro-Wrestling, as well from outside promotions such as New Japan Pro-Wrestling (NJPW), All Japan Pro Wrestling and Dragon Gate.

The event was themed around the final matches of Keiji Muto, who was defeated by NJPW's Tetsuya Naito in the semi-main event, and by Masahiro Chono in the main event match. After the main event, Chono announced his own retirement. The event also featured the retirement match of Nosawa Rongai, who teamed with Mazada in a losing effort against Bullet Club (Taiji Ishimori and Gedo).

== Production ==
=== Background ===
On June 12, 2022 at CyberFight Festival, Muto announced that he would be retiring in 2023. A few days later, Noah announced the dates of Muto's retirement tour, with his final match taking place in the Tokyo Dome on February 21.

=== Storylines ===
The event featured professional wrestling matches that involved different wrestlers from pre-existing scripted feuds and storylines. Wrestlers portrayed villains, heroes, or less distinguishable characters in scripted events that built tension and culminated in a wrestling match or series of matches.

On January 21 at Wrestle Kingdom 17 night 2, Tetsuya Naito defeated Kenoh in the main event. After the match, Keiji Muto came to ring and asked Naito to be he his final opponent in his retirement match at Keiji Muto Grand Final Pro-Wrestling "Last" Love which Naito accepted the proposition by Muto, setting up the match for February 21.

At the same event, Kazuchika Okada and Togi Makabe took on Kaito Kiyomiya and Yoshiki Inamura in a tag team match. Before the match started Kiyomiya wanted to start the match with Okada but Okada let Makabe start for his team instead. During the match, Okada was wrestling Inamura until Kiyomiya came in the ring and attacked Okada by kicking him in the face which resulted in Okada retaliating, causing both Okada and Kiyomiya to brawl outside of the ring until the match eventually ended in a no contest. As Okada left the ring, Kiyomiya challenged Okada to a match only for Okada to return and to continue brawling with Kiyomiya until both men was pulled away by their tag team partners, officials and staff. A match was set between Okada and Kiyomiya for the Tokyo Dome on the following day.

== Event ==
=== Preliminary matches ===
The event started with three pre-show matches broadcast on Noah's YouTube channel. In the first one, GHC Tag Team Champions of the time Masa Kitamiya and Daiki Inaba picked up a victory over Yoshiki Inamura and Yasutaka Yano in tag team competition. Next, a dispute between wrestlers from Tokyo Joshi Pro Wrestling took place with the team of Yuka Sakazaki, Miyu Yamashita, Shoko Nakajima and Rika Tatsumi defeating Mizuki, Maki Itoh, Miu Watanabe and Yuki Arai. The last pre-show match saw Good Looking Guys (Jake Lee, Jack Morris and Anthony Greene) outmatching Sugiura-gun (Takashi Sugiura and Timothy Thatcher) and Satoshi Kojima.

The first match of the main event saw Stinger (Hayata, Chris Ridgeway), Yoshinari Ogawa, Eita, and Daga defeating Atsushi Kotoge, Yo-Hey, Seiki Yoshioka, Alejandro and Junta Miyawaki. Hayata and Ridgeway still held grudges against Ogawa as they were still number one contenders for Ogawa's and Eita's GHC Junior Heavyweight Tag Team Championship at the time. Next up, a clash between DDT Pro-Wrestling teams took place in the fifth match of the night. The37Kamiina (Mao, Shunma Katsumata, Yuki Ueno and Toy Kojima) picked up a victory over Burning (Tetsuya Endo and Yuya Koroku), Hideki Okatani and Takeshi Masada in eight-man tag team action. The sixth match saw Naomichi Marufuji, El Hijo de Dr. Wagner Jr. and Ninja Mack defeating Dragon Gate's Z-Brats (Shun Skywalker, Kai and Diamante). Next up, Kongo (Kenoh, Katsuhiko Nakajima and Manabu Soya) defeated All Japan Pro Wrestling's Kento Miyahara, Suwama and Yuma Aoyagi. The eighth match represented Nosawa Rongai's retirement match in which he teamed up with his old Tokyo Gurentai stablemate and tag team partner Mazada to fall short to New Japan Pro Wrestling's Taiji Ishimori and Gedo of the Bullet Club. The ninth and tenth matches portraited confrontations between singles champions of both Noah and NJPW. In the first one, the IWGP Junior Heavyweight Champion Hiromu Takahashi defeated GHC Junior Heavyweight Champion Amakusa, bout succeeded by the confrontation between IWGP World Heavyweight Champion Kazuchika Okada and GHC Heavyweight Champion Kaito Kiyomiya solded with the victory of Okada.

=== Main event ===
As it was scheduled from weeks before, the event was planned to have a single main event match in which Keiji Muto was expected to face Tetsuya Naito. The bout concluded with Naito's victory, ending a long-term competition between the two wrestlers originated from Naito's looking for Muto since his debut. However, after the match ended, Muto challenged old rival, fellow Three Musketeer and former nWo Japan stablemate Masahiro Chono who joined the commentary table to a short match and even nominated NJPW referee legend Tiger Hattori who was also sitting ringside to officiate the bout. The match concluded with Chono's win which occurred after executing his signature STF hold for the victory.

== Results ==
No.	Results	Stipulations	Times
1^{P}	Masa Kitamiya and Daiki Inaba defeated Yoshiki Inamura and Yasutaka Yano	NOAH Starting Love Tag team match	7:21
2^{P}	Yuka Sakazaki, Miyu Yamashita, Shoko Nakajima and Rika Tatsumi defeated Mizuki, Maki Itoh, Miu Watanabe and Yuki Arai	TJPW Spark Eight-woman tag team match	11:38
3^{P}	Good Looking Guys (Jake Lee, Jack Morris and Anthony Greene) defeated Sugiura-gun (TakaKoji (Takashi Sugiura and Satoshi Kojima) and Timothy Thatcher))	NOAH World Warrior Six-man tag team match	7:14
4	Stinger (Yoshinari Ogawa, Hayata and Chris Ridgeway), Eita, and Daga defeated Atsushi Kotoge, Yo-Hey, Seiki Yoshioka, Alejandro and Junta Miyawaki	NOAH New Explosion Ten-man tag team match	6:23
5	The37Kamiina (Mao, Shunma Katsumata, Yuki Ueno and Toy Kojima) defeated Burning (Tetsuya Endo and Yuya Koroku), Hideki Okatani and Takeshi Masada	DDT Dramatic Dream Future Eight-man tag team match	9:06
6	Naomichi Marufuji, El Hijo de Dr. Wagner Jr. and Ninja Mack defeated Z-Brats (Shun Skywalker, Kai and Diamante)	Dragongate vs NOAH Six-man tag team match	11:20
7	Kongo (Kenoh, Katsuhiko Nakajima and Manabu Soya) defeated Kento Miyahara, Suwama and Yuma Aoyagi	AJPW vs NOAH Six-man tag team match	15:37
8	Bullet Club (Taiji Ishimori and Gedo) defeated Tokyo Gurentai (Nosawa Rongai and Mazada)	NJPW vs NOAH Final de Lucha Tag team match This was Rongai's retirement match	4:43
9	Hiromu Takahashi defeated Amakusa	NJPW vs NOAH Tokyo Tornado Singles match	11:02
10	Kazuchika Okada defeated Kaito Kiyomiya	NJPW vs NOAH Shining Through Singles match	16:32
11	Tetsuya Naito defeated Keiji Muto	NJPW vs NOAH Pro Wrestling "Last" Love Singles match This was Muto's retirement match.	28:58
12	Masahiro Chono defeated Keiji Muto by submission	Singles match This was Chono's retirement match.	1:37
P / – the match was broadcast on the pre-show
