= Saxon Huxley =

English professional wrestler

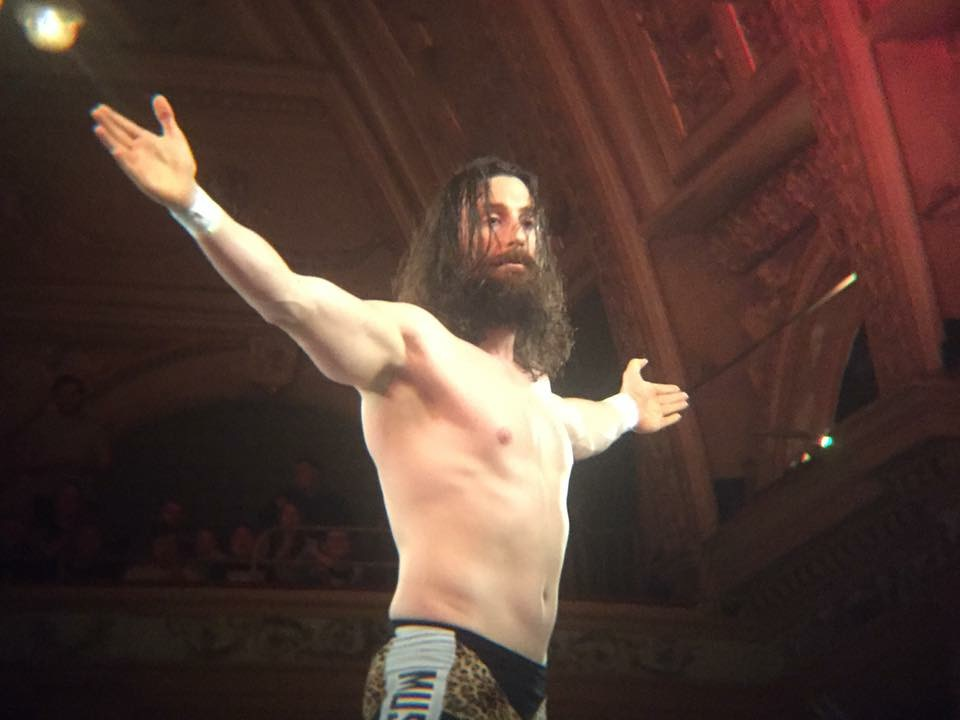
- Saxon Huxley in 2017

Personal information
- Born: Ross Cooke; 1 February 1988 (age 38) Durham, England
- Education: Manor College of Technology; University of Sunderland (BA)

Professional wrestling career
- Ring name: Saxon Huxley
- Billed height: 6 ft 3 in (2.03m)
- Billed weight: 225 lb (102 kg)
- Billed from: Hartlepool, County Durham, England
- Trained by: Lance Storm; Brian Kendrick; Marty Jones; WWE UK Performance Centre
- Debut: 2008

Ross Cooke (born 1 February 1988) is an English professional wrestler best known under the ring name Saxon Huxley (Note: When working in Japan, his name is transliterated as Sakuson Hakkusurī (サクソン・ハックスリー).). He is currently signed to Pro Wrestling Noah, and makes occasional appearances on the British independent circuit. He is best known for his time with WWE, where he performed on the NXT UK brand.

== Early life ==
Cooke grew up in Greatham, Hartlepool, England. He first saw WWF on Sky TV in early 1992 and cites the Roddy Piper vs. Bret Hart match for the Intercontinental Title at WrestleMania VIII as the reason he became a lifelong fan of wrestling. He attended Manor College of Technology secondary school. He has a Bachelor of Arts degree from the University of Sunderland.

== Professional wrestling career ==
=== Early career ===
Cooke first began professional wrestling training in Calgary, Alberta, Canada where he graduated Lance Storm's Storm Wrestling Academy September 2009 class. He would go on to settle on the ring name Saxon Huxley. In 2013 and 2014 Huxley spent both the entire summers training with Brian Kendrick at the Brian Kendrick School of Pro-Wrestling in Los Angeles, California. He competed on the local independent scene, most notably for Championship Wrestling from Hollywood.

Huxley was a regular competitor on the British independent circuit from late 2014 onwards, performing for promotions such as Grapple Wrestling, Megaslam Wrestling, and Rise Underground Pro Wrestling.

=== WWE (2017–2022) ===
Huxley made his WWE debut on 14 January 2017 in the 2017 WWE United Kingdom Championship Tournament. He was eliminated in the first round by Sam Gradwell. On the 31 October 2018, episode of NXT UK, he competed in his first match on the NXT UK brand, losing to Trent Seven. On 18 August 2022, Huxley was released from his WWE contract.

=== Pro Wrestling Noah (2023–present) ===
Huxley made his debut in Pro Wrestling Noah on 19 March 2023, at Great Voyage in Yokohama where he teamed up with Hideki Suzuki to defeat Muhammad Yone and Yoshiki Inamura. He was also presented as the newest member of the Sugiura-gun stable led by Takashi Sugiura. He continued competing regularly in various of the promotion's signature pay-per-views. At Green Journey in Sendai on 16 April 2023, he teamed up with stablemates Hideki Suzuki and Timothy Thatcher to defeat Yoshiki Inamura, Kinya Okada and Sean Legacy in six-man tag team competition. At Noah Majestic 2023, he teamed up with Thatcher as "Real" and defeated Takashi Sugiura and Shuhei Taniguchi to win the GHC Tag Team Championship. On 4 May at Majestic, Huxley and Thatcher defeated Sugiura and Taniguchi to win the GHC Tag Team Championship. In August, Huxley took part in the 2023 N-1 Victory, finishing the tournament with a record of three wins and four losses, failing to advance to the finals of the tournament. On 24 September at Grand Ship In Nagoya, Huxley and Thatcher lost the GHC Tag Team Championship to Good Looking Guys (Jack Morris and Anthony Greene).

From February 24 to March 10, Thatcher and Huxley took part in the 2024 Victory Challenge Tag League, where they finished the tournament with a record of five wins and two losses, advancing to the tournament's finals. On March 10, they were defeated in the finals of the tournament by Kaito Kiyomiya and Ryohei Oiwa. However on March 17, it was announced that Kiyomiya, was forced to withdraw from the title match for the GHC Tag Team Championship due to a spinal cord concussion sustained during training, leading Huxley and Thatcher, who finished as the Victory Challenge Tag League runners-up to replace them. At the title match, at Great Voyage in Yokohama, Thatcher and Huxley unsuccessfully challenged Jack Morris and Anthony Greene for the GHC Tag Team Championship.

== Other media ==
Cooke featured in the 2018 commercial for Smyths Toys kids game Watermelon Smash.

== Championships and accomplishments ==
- Empire Wrestling
  - Empire Tag Team Championship (1 time, inaugural) – with Gabriel Kidd
- Rise Underground Pro Wrestling
  - Rise Championship (2 times)
- Pro Evolution Wrestling
  - Evolution Heavyweight Championship (1 time)
- Progress Wrestling
  - Progress Atlas Championship (1 time)
- Pro Wrestling Illustrated
  - Ranked No. 367 of the top singles wrestlers in the PWI 500 in 2026
  - Ranked No. 79 of the top 100 tag teams in the PWI Tag Team 100 of 2023 with Timothy Thatcher
- Pro Wrestling Noah
  - GHC Tag Team Championship (1 time) – with Timothy Thatcher
- True Grit Wrestling
  - TGW Championship (1 time)
