= Noah Great Voyage in Osaka 2023 =

2023 Pro Wrestling Noah event

NOAH Great Voyage in Osaka 2023
- Promotional poster featuring various Noah wrestlers
- Promotion: CyberFight
- Brand(s): Pro Wrestling Noah
- Date: February 12, 2023
- City: Osaka, Japan
- Venue: Osaka Prefectural Gymnasium
- Attendance: 2,092

Pay-per-view chronology
| ← Previous; The Great Muta Final "Bye-Bye" | Next → Keiji Muto Grand Final Pro-Wrestling "Last" Love |

NOAH Great Voyage in Osaka 2023 was a professional wrestling event promoted by CyberFight's sub-brand Pro Wrestling Noah. It took place on February 12, 2023, in Osaka, Japan, at Osaka Prefectural Gymnasium. The event aired CyberAgent's AbemaTV online linear television service and CyberFight's streaming service Wrestle Universe.

The event featured ten matches with three of Noah's five championships on the line. The main event saw Kaito Kiyomiya defeat Jack Morris to retain the GHC Heavyweight Championship. Other top matches included Yoshinari Ogawa and Eita successfully defending the GHC Junior Heavyweight Tag Team Championship against Junta Miyawaki and Alejandro, and Masa Kitamiya and Daiki Inaba defeated TakaKoji (Takashi Sugiura and Satoshi Kojima) to win the GHC Tag Team Championship. The event also featured special appearances by New Japan Pro-Wrestling (NJPW) wrestlers Tetsuya Naito and Kazuchika Okada.

== Storylines ==
The event featured ten professional wrestling matches that involve different wrestlers from pre-existing scripted feuds and storylines. Wrestlers portray villains, heroes, or less distinguishable characters in scripted events that build tension and culminate in a wrestling match or series of matches.

== Event ==
=== Preliminary matches ===
The event started with the confrontation between (Muhammad Yone and Akitoshi Saito) and Kinya Okada and Taishi Ozawa which solded with the victory of the preceding team. Next, Chris Ridgeway and Daga picked up a victory over Kongo's Tadasuke and Hajime Ohara. In the third bout, Timothy Thatcher, Kazuyuki Fujita and Hideki Suzuki outmatched Masato Tanaka, Masaaki Mochizuki and Yoshiki Inamura. Next up, Kongo (Masakatsu Funaki, Katsuhiko Nakajima, Shuji Kondo and Hi69) defeated Naomichi Marufuji, El Hijo de Dr. Wagner Jr., Amakusa and Ninja Mack. In the fifth match, NJPW's El Desperado teamed up with Nosawa Rongai to defeated Yo-Hey and Yasutaka Yano. In the sixth bout, Kongo's Kenoh and Manabu Soya defeated Good Looking Guys (Jake Lee and Anthony Greene) in a tag team match, victory after which they expressed their intention of going after the GHC Tag Team Championship in the near future. the next bout saw Dralístico defeating Atsushi Kotoge in singles competition. Next, Masa Kitamiya and Daiki Inaba defeated TakaKoji (Takashi Sugiura and Satoshi Kojima) to win the GHC Tag Team Championship for the first time as a team, while it was the seventh individual win for Kitamiya and the first for Inaba, ending the latter team's reign at 140 days. In the semi main event, Yoshinari Ogawa and Eita defeated Junta Miyawaki and Alejandro to retain the GHC Junior Heavyweight Tag Team Championship for the first time in that respective reign. After the match concluded, Chris Ridgeway and Hayata stepped up and issued a challenge and attacked both Ogawa and Eita, leaving Ogawa's status in Stinger hanging up in the air.

=== Main event ===
Before the main event took place, Keiji Mutoh came up to the commentary booth. Tetsuya Naito made a surprise appearance as he showed up to tease Mutoh ahead of the latter's retirement match against Naito from the event which was scheduled to take place next, the Keiji Muto Grand Final Pro-Wrestling "Last-Love" from February 21, 2023. In the actual main event, Kaito Kiyomiya defeated Jack Morris to secure his fourth consecutive defense of the GHC Heavyweight Championship. After the bout concluded, Kazuchika Okada suddenly attacked Kiyomiya, reminding him of their match which was scheduled to take place at Muto Grand Final as well. It was also revealed that Jake Lee would be the next challenger for Kiyomiya's title, match which was set to take place at Great Voyage in Yokohama on March 19, 2023.

== Results ==
| No. | Results | Stipulations | Times |
|---|---|---|---|
| 1 | Funky Express (Muhammad Yone and Akitoshi Saito) defeated Kinya Okada and Taishi Ozawa | Tag team match | 7:05 |
| 2 | Chris Ridgeway and Daga defeated Kongo (Tadasuke and Hajime Ohara) | Tag team match | 6:09 |
| 3 | Sugiura-gun (Timothy Thatcher, Kazuyuki Fujita and Hideki Suzuki) defeated Masato Tanaka, Masaaki Mochizuki and Yoshiki Inamura | Six-man tag team match | 13:45 |
| 4 | Kongo (Masakatsu Funaki, Katsuhiko Nakajima, Shuji Kondo and Hi69) defeated Naomichi Marufuji, El Hijo de Dr. Wagner Jr., Amakusa and Ninja Mack | Eight-man tag team match | 12:17 |
| 5 | El Desperado and Nosawa Rongai defeated Yo-Hey and Yasutaka Yano | Tag team match | 15:57 |
| 6 | Kongo (Kenoh and Manabu Soya) defeated Good Looking Guys (Jake Lee and Anthony Greene) | Tag team match | 12:09 |
| 7 | Dralístico defeated Atsushi Kotoge | Singles match | 13:18 |
| 8 | Masa Kitamiya and Daiki Inaba defeated TakaKoji (Takashi Sugiura and Satoshi Kojima) (c) | Tag team match for the GHC Tag Team Championship | 17:04 |
| 9 | Yoshinari Ogawa and Eita (c) defeated Junta Miyawaki and Alejandro | Tag team match for the GHC Junior Heavyweight Tag Team Championship | 19:10 |
| 10 | Kaito Kiyomiya (c) defeated Jack Morris | Singles match for the GHC Heavyweight Championship | 19:11 |
(c) / – the champion(s) heading into the match
