= Jack Morris (wrestler) =

Scottish professional wrestler

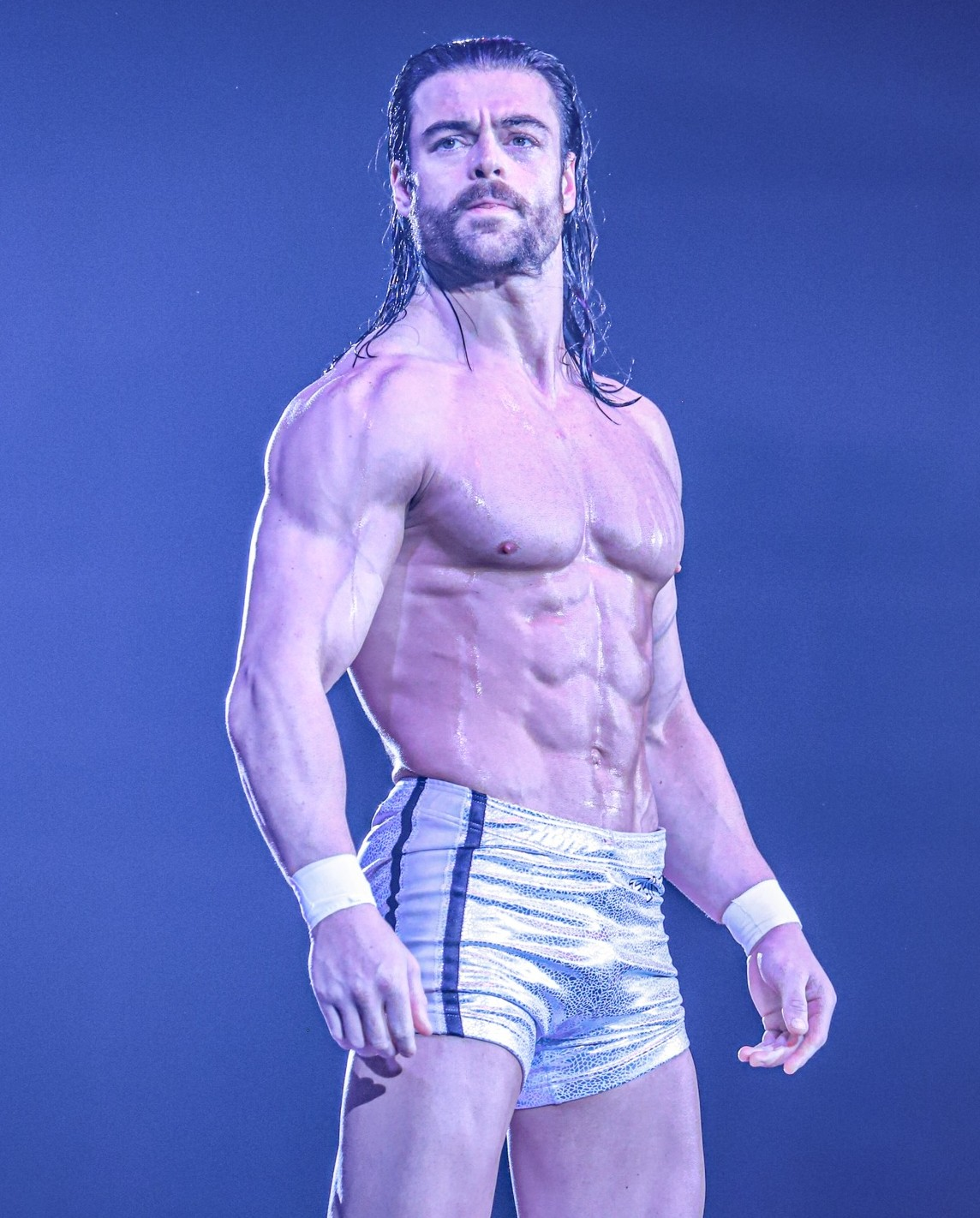
- Morris in October 2022

Personal information
- Born: Jack Morris Nicholson; 6 October 1993 (age 33) Dunfermline, Scotland

Professional wrestling career
- Ring name: Jack Morris
- Billed height: 183 cm (6 ft 0 in)
- Billed weight: 93 kg (205 lb)
- Debut: 2017

Jack Morris Nicholson (born 6 October 1993) is a Scottish professional wrestler. He is currently signed to the Japanese promotion Pro Wrestling Noah, where he performs under the shortened ring name Jack Morris. There, he is a former GHC National Champion and former three-time GHC Tag Team Champion. Morris also makes occasional appearances on the British independent circuit.

== Early life ==
Prior to his professional wrestling career, Nicholson was a professional footballer and played as a striker for the Scottish team Cowdenbeath F.C. of the Lowland Football League. Injuries forced him to quit football and eventually make his transition to professional wrestling.

== Professional wrestling career ==
=== British independent scene (2017–present) ===
Nicholson started his career working for local Scottish promotions such as Reckless Intent, Discovery Wrestling and Insane Championship Wrestling under the ring name, Jack Morris. His main work took place in the British independent scene. He competed in a suite of events promoted by Revolution Pro Wrestling, first of them being the RevPro Live In London 71 from 5 March 2023, where he picked up a victory over TK Cooper. At RevPro Raw Deal 2023 on 11 March, he fell short to Dan Moloney.

==== Insane Championship Wrestling (2019–2022) ====
Morris shared a three-year tenure with Insane Championship Wrestling. He made his debut in the promotion at ICW Fight Club #115 on 13 January 2019, where he teamed up with Dickie Divers to defeat The Kinky Party (Jack Jester and Sha Samuels). He participated in various of the promotion's signature events such as the Lionheart League where he competed against the winner Sha Samuels, Alexander Darwin MacAllan, B. T. Gunn, Daz Black, DCT, Grant McIvor, Ian Skinner, Jack Jester, Jason Reed, Leyton Buzzard, Liam Thomson, Luca De Pazzi, Stevie Boy, Stevie James and Theo Doros. At ICW 8th Annual Square Go! on 24 February 2019, Morris competed in a 30-man square go match to determine the number one contendership for the ICW World Heavyweight Championship won by Rudo Lightning and also involving notable opponents such as Grado, Jeff Jarrett, Jimmy Havoc, Joe Hendry, Wolfgang, Andy Wild, Mark Coffey, Leyton Buzzard, Viper, Kenny Williams, BT Gunn and many others.

Morris and Dickie Divers formed the team The Nine9. On 16 June 2019, they defeated The Kings of Catch (Aspen Faith and Lewis Girvan) at ICW I Ain't Yer Pal, Dickface!.

On 20 March 2021, The Nine9 defeated Krieger and Lou King Sharp to win the ICW Tag Team Championships in a steel cage match. The duo successfully defended the titles until ICW: Fear and Loathing XIII where they were dethroned by The Kings of the North.

=== Pro Wrestling Noah (2022–present) ===
==== Good Looking Guys (2022–2024) ====
Morris made his debut in Pro Wrestling Noah on the first night of the 2022 edition of the N-1 Victory, the most important tournament of the promotion. He competed in the block B where he scored a total of six points after going against Kaito Kiyomiya, Katsuhiko Nakajima, Masakatsu Funaki, Takashi Sugiura, Satoshi Kojima, Masa Kitamiya and Kinya Okada.

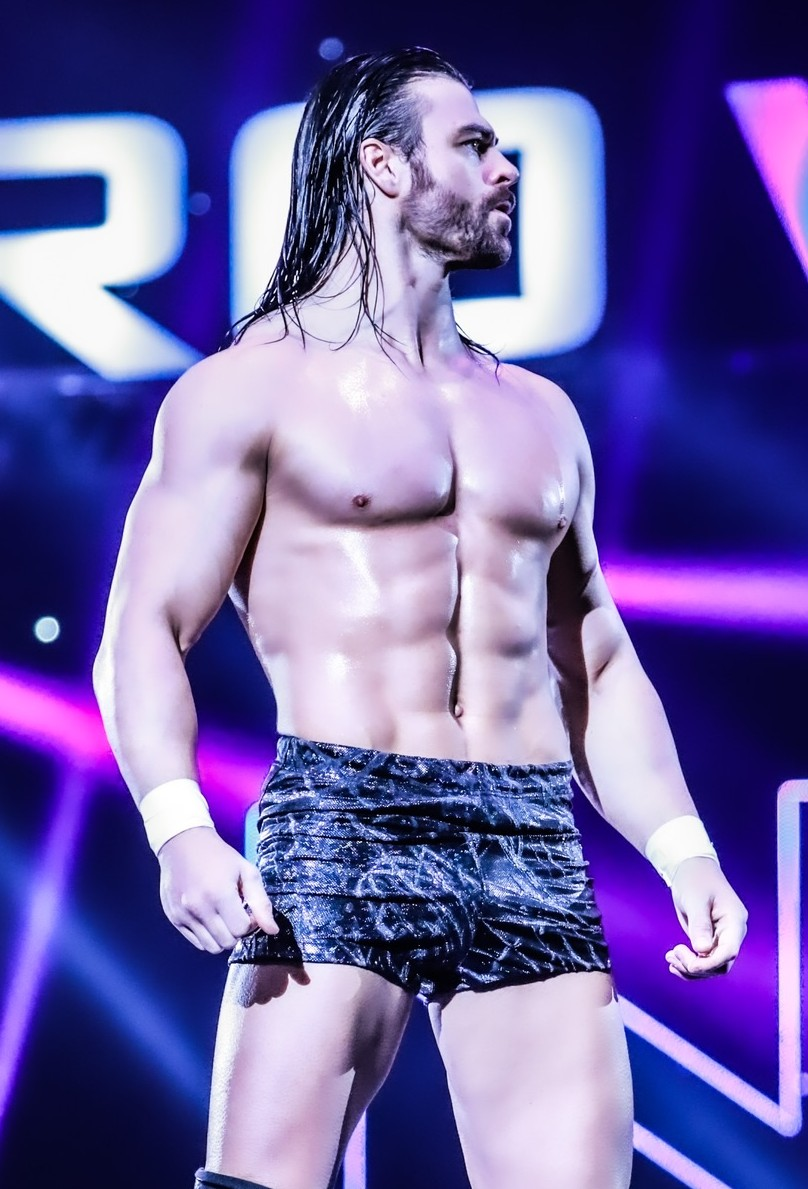
Morris in 2022

He soon started competing in various of the promotion signature pay-per-views. First of them was the Noah Grand Ship In Nagoya 2022 from 25 September where he teamed up with El Hijo del Dr. Wagner Jr. and Naomichi Marufuji to defeat Daiki Inaba, Masaaki Mochizuki and Masato Tanaka in a six-man tag team match. At Noah Ariake Triumph 2022 on 30 October he teamed up with Dante Leon to defeat Daiki Inaba and Yo-Hey. At Noah The Best 2022 on 23 November he defeated Inaba in singles competition. At Noah The New Year 2023 on 1 January Morris defeated Timothy Thatcher. He joined the "Good Looking Guys" unit and he teamed up with his stablemates Jake Lee and Anthony Greene for the first time at The Great Muta Final "Bye-Bye" on 22 January 2023, where they defeated Masa Kitamiya, Daiki Inaba and Yoshiki Inamura. On the first night of the Noah Star Navigation 2023 from 5 February Morris teamed up with Lee and Anthony again in a losing effort against Kaito Kiyomiya, Naomichi Marafuji and Takashi Sugiura. At Noah Great Voyage in Osaka 2023 on 12 February he unsuccessfully challenged Kaito Kiyomiya for the GHC Heavyweight Championship. At Keiji Muto Grand Final Pro-Wrestling "Last" Love on 21 February 2023, he teamed up with Lee and Anthony to defeat Sugiura-gun's Takashi Sugiura and Timothy Thatcher, and Satoshi Kojima. At Noah Great Voyage in Yokohama 2023 on 19 March, Morris teamed up with Anthony to defeat Naomichi Marufuji and El Hijo de Dr. Wagner Jr. in tag team action. This was the build up of a short-term feud between Morris and Wagner Jr. as he is expected to face the latter at Noah Green Journey in Sendai 2023 on 16 April for the GHC National Championship.

In August, Morris took part in the 2023 N-1 Victory, finishing the tournament with a record of four wins, two losses and a draw, failing to advance to the finals of the tournament. On 24 September at Grand Ship In Nagoya, Morris and Anthony Greene defeated Real (Timothy Thatcher and Saxon Huxley) to win the GHC Tag Team Championship. On 28 October at Demolition Stage In Fukuoka, Morris defeated El Hijo de Dr. Wagner Jr. in a rematch to win the GHC National Championship, becoming a double champion, in the process. He lost the title to Hayata on 11 April 2024 in his fourth title defence. On June 16 at Grand Ship In Yokohama, Morris and Greene lost the GHC Tag Team Championship to Brave (Naomichi Marufuji and Takashi Sugiura) in their ninth title defense, ending their reign at 266 days. On July 13 at Destination, Good Looking Guys disbanded. Afterwards, Jake Lee joined Bullet Club War Dogs, leading Morris to confront him before Lee attacked Morris. In August, Morris took part in the 2024 N-1 Victory, finishing the tournament with a record of four wins and three losses, failing to advance to the finals of the tournament.

==== Team 2000X (2024–2025) ====
On September 30, Morris faced Greene and LJ Cleary in a three-way match. The match ended in a no-contest, when a masked wrestler attacked the referee. Afterwards, he refused to shake Clearly's hand, only to shake Morris' instead with the two leaving the arena together. Morris then announced that the masked man's identity would be revealed on October 14. On October 7, Morris faced Greene in a match, which ended in a no-contest, after the masked wrestler attacked Greene. Afterwards, Daga, who pretended to help Greene, turned on him, aligning himself with Morris and the masked wrestler before the three attacked Morris and Greene's former stablemate LJ Cleary. On October 14, the mystery member was revealed to Yoshitatsu, with the three naming their stable "Team 2000X". On October 27, Morris, Daga and Yoshitatsu attacked Ulka Sasaki, after his match. Afterwards, they began targeting Sasaki, with Morris confronting Sasaki, demanding a match against him on November 17, the winner facing Shinsuke Nakamura on January 1, 2025, at Noah The New Year 2025. On November 17 at Deathnity, Morris was defeated by Sasaki.

== Other media ==
In 2021, Nicholson appeared as a participant on the BBC One gameshow I Can See Your Voice, where the two contestants won money by correctly guessing he was a bad singer.

== Personal life ==
In addition to his professional wrestling career, Nicholson works as a gym instructor.

== Championships and accomplishments ==
- Discovery Wrestling
  - Disco Derby (2022)
- Insane Championship Wrestling
  - ICW Zero-G Championship (1 time)
  - ICW Tag Team Championship (1 time) – with Dickie Divers
- International Wrestling Revolution Group
  - IWRG Mexico Championship (1 time, current)
  - IWRG Intercontinental Tag Team Championship (1 time, current) – with Tirano
- Pro Wrestling Illustrated
  - Ranked No. 310 of the top 500 singles wrestlers in the PWI 500 in 2023
- Pro Wrestling Noah
  - GHC National Championship (1 time)
  - GHC Tag Team Championship (3 times) – with Anthony Greene (1), Omos (1) and Daga (1)
- Reckless Intent Wrestling
  - Reckless Intent Heavyweight Championship (1 time)
  - Reckless Intent UK Championship (1 time)
  - Reckless Intent Tag Team Championship (1 time) – with Dickie Divers
  - Battle Of West Lothian Tournament (2019)
- Scottish Wrestling Alliance
  - SWA X Championship (1 time)
