= Good Looking Guys =

Professional wrestling stable

- Logo of the stable (2023–2024)

Stable
- Members: See below
- Debut: January 19, 2023
- Disbanded: July 13, 2024
- Years active: 2023–2024

Good Looking Guys (often abbreviated as G.L.G) was a professional wrestling stable, based in the Pro Wrestling Noah (Noah) promotion and was only led by Jake Lee between 2023 and 2024. The stable was initially composed of gaijins Jack Morris and Anthony Greene who were led by Jake Lee and started as a trio. Tadasuke, YO-HEY and LJ Cleary later joined the stable.

== History ==
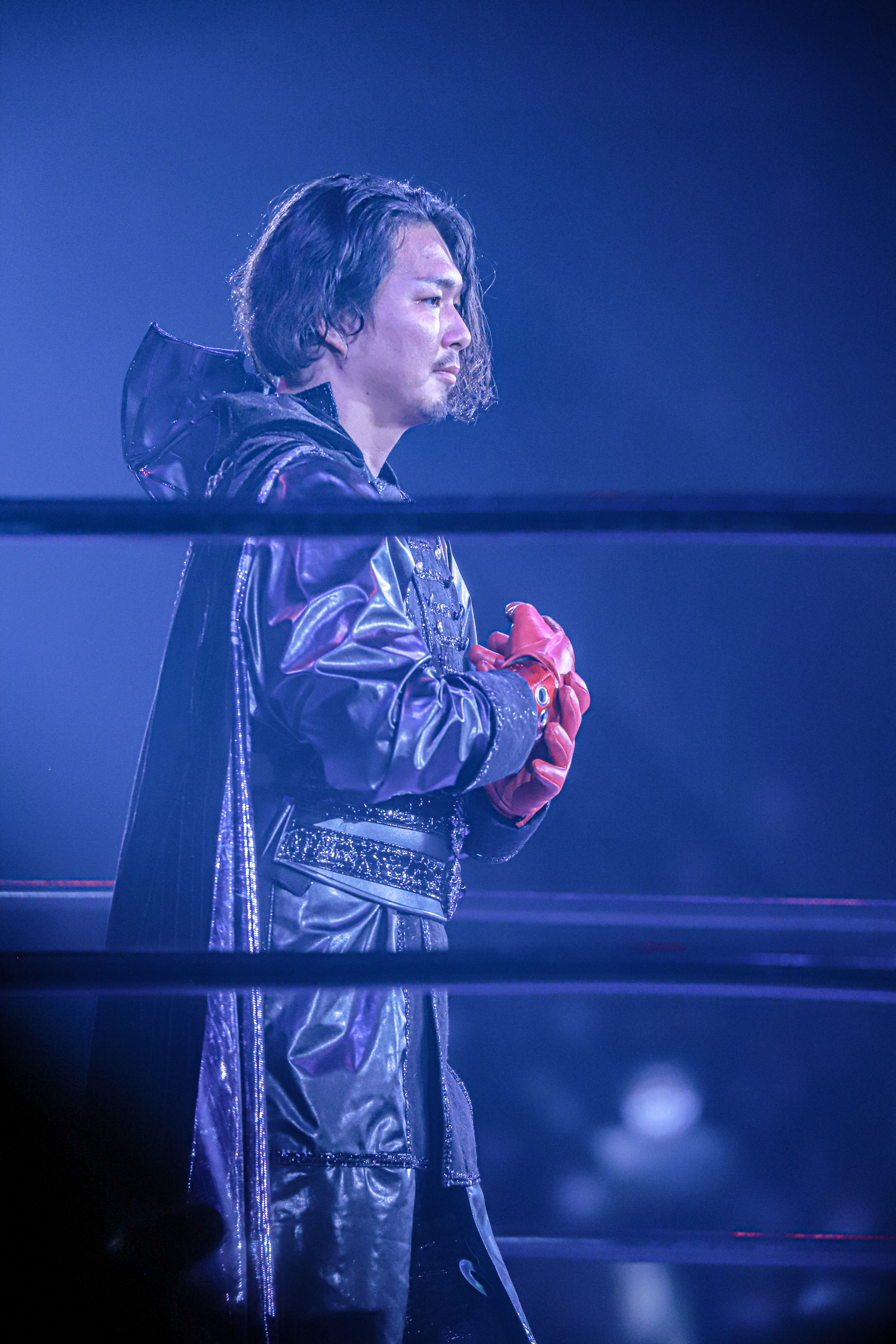
Leader of the stable, Jake Lee.

=== Jake Lee's leadership (2023–2024) ===
On January 1, 2023, at The New Year, Jake Lee, who had recently left All Japan Pro Wrestling after his contract expired, made his debut for Pro Wrestling Noah, confronting Jack Morris after the latter's match against Timothy Thatcher, before congratulated him on his victory, with the two forming a team. On January 19, Lee and Morris announced the creation of the "Good Looking Guys" stable alongside Anthony Greene. The three underwent their first official match as a unit on January 22, 2023, at The Great Muta Final "Bye-Bye" where they defeated Masa Kitamiya, Daiki Inaba and Yoshiki Inamura in a six-man tag team match.

At NOAH Sunny Voyage 2023 on February 4, Jack Morris and Jake Lee picked up a victory over then-time GHC Heavyweight Champion Kaito Kiyomiya and Yoshiki Inamura. Morris scored the pin over Kiyomiya and challenged him to a title match on further notice. On the first night of the Noah Star Navigation 2023 from February 5, Lee, Morris and Greene fell short to Kaito Kiyomiya, Naomichi Marufuji and Takashi Sugiura. At Noah Great Voyage in Osaka 2023 on February 12, Kiyomiya successfully defended the GHC Heavyweight Championship against Morris, just to be laid a challenge by Jake Lee the same night. On the second night of the Star Navigation event from March 9, 2023, Jake Lee and Anthony Greene defeated Kaito Kiyomiya and Atsushi Kotoge in tag team action. At Noah Great Voyage in Yokohama 2023 on March 19, Jack Morris and Anthony Greene outmatched Naomichi Marufuji and El Hijo de Dr. Wagner Jr., and Jake Lee defeated Kaito Kiyomiya to win the GHC Heavyweight Championship. On the same night it was also revealed that Tadasuke defected from Kongo to join the unit and YO-HEY was also presented as a new member. At Noah Green Journey in Sendai 2023 on April 16, Anthony Greene defeated Taishi Ozawa in singles competition, Tadasuke and YO-HEY defeated Yoshinari Ogawa and Eita to become the new GHC Junior Heavyweight Tag Team Champions, Jack Morris unsuccessfully challenged El Hijo de Dr. Wagner Jr. for the GHC National Championship and Jake Lee secured his first defense of the GHC Heavyweight Championship on that respective reign. He then received a title challenge from Naomichi Marufuji for Noah Majestic 2023 on May 4 from which he emerged victorious. At the same event, Jack Morris, Anthony Greene, Tadasuke and Yo-Hey defeated Sean Legacy, Stallion Rogers and Los Golpeadores (Dragón Bane and Alpha Wolf) in eight-man tag team competition. At Noah Great Journey in Nagoya 2023 on June 17, Jack Morris, Tadasuke and Yo-Hey defeated Stinger (Chris Ridgeway and Daga) and Sean Legacy in six-man tag team action. At the 2023 edition of the N-1 Victory, Jake Lee and Jack Morris competed in the A Block, failing to qualify for the finals. At Noah Grand Ship In Nagoya 2023 on September 24, Yo-Hey and Tadasuke defeated Hajime Ohara and Shuji Kondo, Jack Morris and Anthony Greene defeated Real (Timothy Thatcher and Saxon Huxley) to win the GHC Tag Team Championship and Jake Lee defeated Go Shiozaki to retain the GHC Heavyweight Championship. At Noah Demolition Stage In Fukuoka 2023 on October 28, Anthony Greene and LJ Cleary fell short to Kaito Kiyomiya and Ryohei Oiwa, Yo-Hey and Tadasuke unsuccessfully challenged Los Golpeadores (Dragón Bane and Alpha Wolf) for the GHC Junior Heavyweight Tag Team Championship, Jack Morris defeated El Hijo de Dr. Wagner Jr. to win the GHC National Championship and Jake Lee dropped the GHC Heavyweight Championship to Kenoh.

At Noah The New Year 2024 on January 2, Yo-Hey and Tadasuke defeated reigning champions Dragón Bane and Alpha Wolf, and Ninja Mack and Alejandro in a Three-way tag team match to win the GHC Junior Heavyweight Tag Team Championship, and Jake Lee, Jack Morris and Anthony Greene defeated El Hijo del Dr. Wagner Jr., Vinnie Massaro and Titus Alexander in six-man tag team competition. On the first night of the Noah Star Navigation 2024 from January 13, Jack Morris and LJ Cleary fell short to Vinnie Massaro and Titus Alexander, and Jake Lee, Anthony Greene, Yo-Hey and Tadasuke fell short to Masa Kitamiya, Daiki Inaba, Shuji Kondo and Junta Miyawaki. At Noah Sunny Voyage 2024 on January 17, Jake Lee, Anthony Greene, Yo-Hey, Tadasuke and LJ Cleary fell short to Kaito Kiyomiya, Ryohei Oiwa, El Hijo del Dr. Wagner Jr. and Los Golpeadores (Dragón Bane and Alpha Wolf) in eight-man tag team competition, and Jack Morris successfully defended the GHC National Championship against Titus Alexander. At Noah Cross Over in Sendai 2024 on February 4, Jake Lee, Yo-Hey and Tadasuke defeated Kazuyuki Fujita, Shuji Kondo and Junta Miyawaki, and Jack Morris and Anthony Greene defeated Dragón Bane and Alpha Wolf to retain the GHC Tag Team Championship. On the second night of the Noah Star Navigation 2024 from February 23, Jake Lee and LJ Cleary fell short to Naomichi Marufuji and Kazuyuki Fujita in tag team action, Jack Morris defeated stablemate Anthony Greene to retain the GHC National Championship, and Yo-Hey and Tadasuke defeated Hayata and Eita to retain the GHC Junior Heavyweight Tag Team Championship. At Noah Great Voyage in Yokohama 2024 on March 17, Jake Lee and Tadasuke fell short to El Hijo de Dr. Wagner Jr. and Shuji Kondo, and Jack Morris and Anthony Greene defeated Real (Saxon Huxley and Timothy Thatcher) to retain the GHC Tag Team Championship. At Noah Wrestle Magic on May 4, Tadasuke and Yo-Hey defeated Los Golpeadores (Dragón Bane and Alpha Wolf) and Aagan Iisou (Shuji Kondo and "Brother" Yasshi) to retain the GHC Junior Heavyweight Tag Team Championship, Jake Lee teamed up with Tajiri to defeat Naomichi Marufuji and Hajime Ohara, and Jack Morris and Anthony Greene defeated Tencozy (Satoshi Kojima and Hiroyoshi Tenzan) to retain the GHC Tag Team Championship.

==== Stable's last months and Dissolution (June–July 2024) ====
At Noah Grand Ship In Yokohama on June 16, 2024, Jake Lee, Yo-Hey and Tadasuke defeated All Rebellion (Kenoh, Alejandro and Cristobal), and Jack Morris and Anthony Greene dropped the GHC Tag Team Championship to Naomichi Marufuji and Takashi Sugiura. During the event, Jake Lee announced that the stable would disband one month later at Noah Destination 2024 on July 13. In this event, one half of the Good Looking Guys (Jake Lee, Yo-Hey and Tadasuke) defeated the other half of the Good Looking Guys (Jack Morris, Anthony Greene and LJ Cleary) in the stable's last match. After it was all over, Gedo, on behalf of Bullet Club's leader David Finlay, presented Lee with a Bullet Club War Dogs shirt as an invitation to become a full time member of the stable, which Lee instantly accepted. This led to the entire crowd become shocked as well as Lee's former teammates. Jack Morris, particularly, got upset at him for his decision and got in his face, which led him to be chokeslammed by Lee for that. After that, the former members of the stable rushed in to check on Morris, while Lee grabbed a mic and sarcastically bid NOAH goodbye, leaving with Gedo maniacally laughing.

==== New Japan Pro Wrestling (2024) ====
Due to NJPW and Pro Wrestling Noah holding business partnerships, various of the stable's members competed at All Together, a cross-over event produced by United Japan Pro-Wrestling. On the May 6, 2024 show, Jake Lee teamed up with Bullet Club's David Finlay and Gabe Kidd to defeat Los Ingobernables De Japon (Tetsuya Naito, Shingo Takagi and Yota Tsuji). On the June 15, 2024 show, Jack Morris, Anthony Greene and LJ Cleary teamed up with Bullet Club's Clark Connors and Drilla Moloney in a losing effort against Los Ingobernables de Japon (Shingo Takagi, Bushi, Hiromu Takahashi, Titán and Yota Tsuji), and Jake Lee fell short to Tetsuya Naito in the main event.

== Members ==
| * | Founding member |
| L | Leader |

=== Former ===
| Member | | Joined | Left |
|---|---|---|---|
| Jake Lee | L* | January 17, 2023 | July 13, 2024 |
| Jack Morris | * | January 17, 2023 | July 13, 2024 |
| Anthony Greene | * | January 17, 2023 | July 13, 2024 |
| Tadasuke | | March 19, 2023 | July 13, 2024 |
| YO-HEY | | March 19, 2023 | July 13, 2024 |
| LJ Cleary | | October 9, 2023 | July 13, 2024 |

== Championships and accomplishments ==
- Pro Wrestling Illustrated
  - Ranked Jake Lee No. 23 of the top 500 singles wrestlers in the PWI 500 in 2023
  - Ranked Jack Morris No. 310 of the top 500 singles wrestlers in the PWI 500 in 2023
  - Ranked Anthony Greene No. 352 of the top 500 singles wrestlers in the PWI 500 in 2023
- Pro Wrestling Noah
  - GHC Heavyweight Championship (1 time) – Lee
  - GHC National Championship (1 time) – Morris
  - GHC Tag Team Championship (1 time) – Morris and Greene
  - GHC Junior Heavyweight Tag Team Championship (2 times) – Tadasuke and YO-HEY
