= Chris Ridgeway =

English professional wrestler

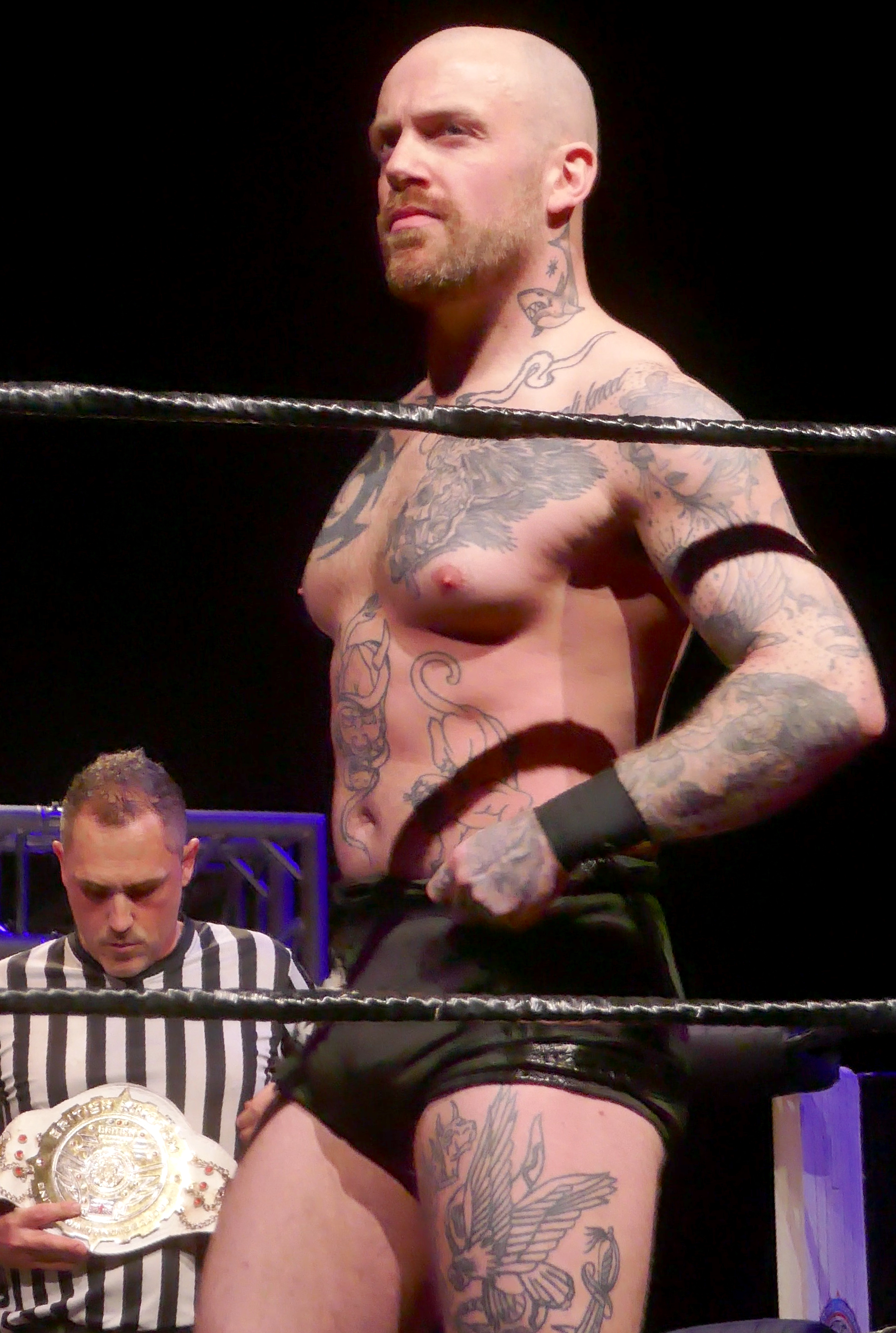
- Ridgeway in May 2026

Personal information
- Born: July 6, 1993 (age 33) Liverpool, England

Professional wrestling career
- Ring name: Chris Ridgeway
- Billed height: 1.75 m (5 ft 9 in)
- Billed weight: 79 kg (174 lb)
- Trained by: Robbie Brookside; Chris Masters
- Debut: 2012

Chris Wareing is an English professional wrestler, better known by his ring name Chris Ridgeway. He currently performs on the British independent circuit, predominantly for Revolution Pro Wrestling (RevPro) and Progress Wrestling, where He is a former one-time PROGRESS World Champion. He is best known for his time in Pro Wrestling Noah, where former two-time GHC Junior Heavyweight Tag Team Champion with Daga and Yoshinari Ogawa.

== Professional wrestling career ==
=== Independent circuit (2012–present) ===
Wareing participated at ICW Why Aye Man!, an event produced by Insane Championship Wrestling on 2 April 2016, where he suffered a loss against Kenny Williams. He took part in the wXw 16 Carat Gold 2020 Tournament, where he fell short to Mike Bailey in a first-round match from 6 March 2020. Wareing worked in a match for International Pro Wrestling: United Kingdom, at IPW Undisputed II on 23 December 2018, where he unsuccessfully challenged Kip Sabian for the IPW:UK World Championship. He also competed in the defunct Defiant Wrestling promotion where he faced the champion Walter and El Phantasmo in a three-way match for the Defiant Internet Championship on 3 December 2018 at Defiant Loaded #1.

=== Progress Wrestling (2017–present) ===
Wareing is known for his tenure with Progress Wrestling. At PROGRESS Chapter 74: Mid Week Matters on 25 July 2018 he faced Mark Haskins, Eddie Dennis and Pete Dunne in a four-way match, falling short to the latter. He competed in a reverse battle royal at PROGRESS Chapter 100: Unboxing Live IV - A New Hope on 30 December 2019 against the winner Chief Deputy Dunne, Travis Banks, El Ligero, Los Federales Santos Jr. and others. At the Super Strong Style 16 Tournament Edition 2019 held at PPOGRESS Chapter 88, Wareing scored a loss to Kyle O'Reilly on the first night from 4 May. On the second night, teamed up with Darby Allin and Lucky Kid, defeating Chris Brookes, DJ Z and Artemis Spencer in a six-man tag team match. He competed against Paul Robinson at PROGRESS Chapter 99: With A Flake, Please in a knockout of submission match for the Progress Proteus Championship, where he lost by referee decision. He defeated Gene Munny, Omari and Spike Trivet in a four-way match at PROGRESS Chapter 104: Natural Progression on 20 February 2021, to become the number one contender for the Progress Unified World Championship. He competed at PROGRESS Chapter 105: Bring The Thunder, on 27 Febauray 2021, where he fell short to Cara Noir in a match for the Progress Unified World Championship. At PROGRESS Chapter 106: Stick A Pony In Me Pocket on 13 March 2021, Ridgeway teamed up with Ethan Allen in a losing effort to Lykos Gym (Kid Lykos & Kid Lykos II). At Super Strong Style 16, Ridgeway won the Super Strong Style 16 tournament and the vacant Progress Wrestling Unified World Championship.

=== Pro Wrestling Noah (2019–2020) ===
Wareing worked in several events for Pro Wrestling Noah, first of them being at the NOAH Global Junior Tag League 2019, where in the first night of the event from 28 May, he teamed up with Hitoshi Kumano to defeat Hajime Ohara and Nosawa Rongai. On the second night og 30 May, they fell short to Kotaro Suzuki and Yoshinari Ogawa, and on the third night of 31 May, they defeated Junta Miyawaki and Seiya Morohashi. After getting eliminated from the tournament, Wareing participated in an eight-man tag team match which took place on the seventh night of the event, where he teamed up with Hitoshi Kumano, Katsuhiko Nakajima and Shuhei Taniguchi in a losing effort to Atsushi Kotoge, Masa Kitamiya, Kenoh and Yoshiki Inamura. Wareing participated in the NOAH Global Junior League 2019 where he placed himself in the Block B of the tournament and competed against superstars such as the later winner Hayata, Kotaro Suzuki and Hi69. On 15 July, after finishing the block matches, he teamed up with Kaito Kiyomiya and Shuhei Taniguchi to defeat the team of AXIZ (Go Shiozaki, Katsuhiko Nakajima) and Naomichi Marufuji in a six-man tag team match. In the Junior League of 2020, he placed himself in the D Block where he competed against Daisuke Harada, Minoru Tanaka and Nio, finishing with only two points. Wareing unsuccessfully challenged Hayata for the GHC Junior Heavyweight Championship at NOAH Starting Over 2019 on 3 December 2019. He also competed for the IPW:UK Junior Heavyweight Championship at NOAH N-1 Victory 2019 on the sixth night of the event from 25 August, where he fell short to Daisuke Harada.

=== Revolution Pro Wrestling (2017–present) ===
On the first night of the RevPro British J Cup 2018, an event promoted by Revolution Pro Wrestling from 8 September, Wareing fell short to Kushida in a first round match. On the second night from 9 September, he teamed up with CCK's Chris Brookes and Jonathan Gresham to defeat Dean Allmark, Ryusuke Taguchi and Tiger Mask IV in six-man tag team match action.

=== Return to Noah (2022–2023) ===
Following the mitigation of the COVID-19 travel restrictions, on 23 March 2022 it was announced that Ridgeway would be returning to Stinger on 29 April at Majestic. At the event, Ridgeway and Stinger stablemate Yoshinari Ogawa defeated Atsushi Kotoge and Yo-Hey to win the GHC Junior Heavyweight Tag Team Championship. On 4 May Yuya Susumu and Seiki Yoshioka attacked Ogawa and Ridgeway, before challenging them to a title match for the GHC Junior Heavyweight Tag Team Championship, with HAYATA siding with them due to a previously shared background. Afterwards, Ogawa and Ridgeway attacked HAYATA, Susumu and Yoshioka, during a post-match interview. This led to a match on 21 May for the GHC Junior Heavyweight Tag Team Championship where the losing team would be forced to leave Stinger. The match ended in a no contest, following the interference from Los Perros del Mal de Japón, which in turn led the stable to reconcile. Afterwards, it was announced that Ridgeway would be returning to the United Kingdom. He made his return on 3 September, successfully defending the GHC Junior Heavyweight Tag Team Championship against Los Perros del Mal de Japón's Eita and Nosawa Rongai. They lost the titles to Atsushi Kotoge and Seiki Yoshioka on 23 September.

On 5 February 2023, at Star Navigation, Ridgeway teamed up with Eita, Nosawa Rongai, Yoshinari Ogawa and a debuting Daga to defeat Alejandro, Amakusa, Junta Miyawaki, Seiki Yoshioka and Yo-Hey. At Noah Majestic 2023 on 4 May, Ridgeway and Ogawa defeated Eita and Daga, after Daga betrayed Eita and joined Stinger. On 22 June at NOAH Star Navigation, Ridgeway teamed with Daga defeating Good Looking Guys (Tadasuke and Yo-Hey), capturing the GHC Junior Heavyweight Tag Team Championship for the second time. On 5 September Ridgeway announced that he would be leaving NOAH to return to the United Kingdom for personal reasons, leading him and Daga to vacate the GHC Junior Heavyweight Tag Team Championship.

== Championships and accomplishments ==
- Wrestle Carnival
  - WrestleCarnival Pure Championship (1 time, inaugural)
  - WrestleCarnival Pure Title Tournament (2022)
- Fight! Nation Wrestling
  - FNW British Championship (1 time)
- Knockout Wrestling
  - KOW Heavyweight Championship (1 time)
- FutureShock Wrestling
  - FSW Championship (1 time)
  - FSW Adrenaline Championship (1 time)
  - FSW Tag Team Championship (1 time) - with T-Bone
- Gleat
  - G-Infinity Championship (1 time) – with Drew Parker
- Premier British Wrestling
  - King of Cruisers (2016)
- Pro Wrestling Illustrated
  - Ranked No. 328 of the top 500 singles wrestlers in the PWI 500 in 2021
- Pro Wrestling Noah
  - GHC Junior Heavyweight Tag Team Championship (2 times) – with Yoshinari Ogawa (1) and Daga (1)
- Tetsujin:Hybrid Wrestling
  - Beauty In Combat Tournament (2018)
- International Pro Wrestling: United Kingdom
  - International Super 8 Tournament (2018)
- Progress Wrestling
  - PROGRESS World Championship (1 time)
  - Super Strong Style 16 (2022)
- Shropshire Wrestling Alliance
  - SWA Championship (1 time)
  - GoldRush Rumble (2017)
- The Wrestling League
  - WLGP Championship (1 time, inaugural)
  - WLGP Title Tournament (2018)
- TNT Extreme Wrestling
  - TNT Extreme Division Championship (1 time)
