= Lanzeloth =

Mexican professional wrestler

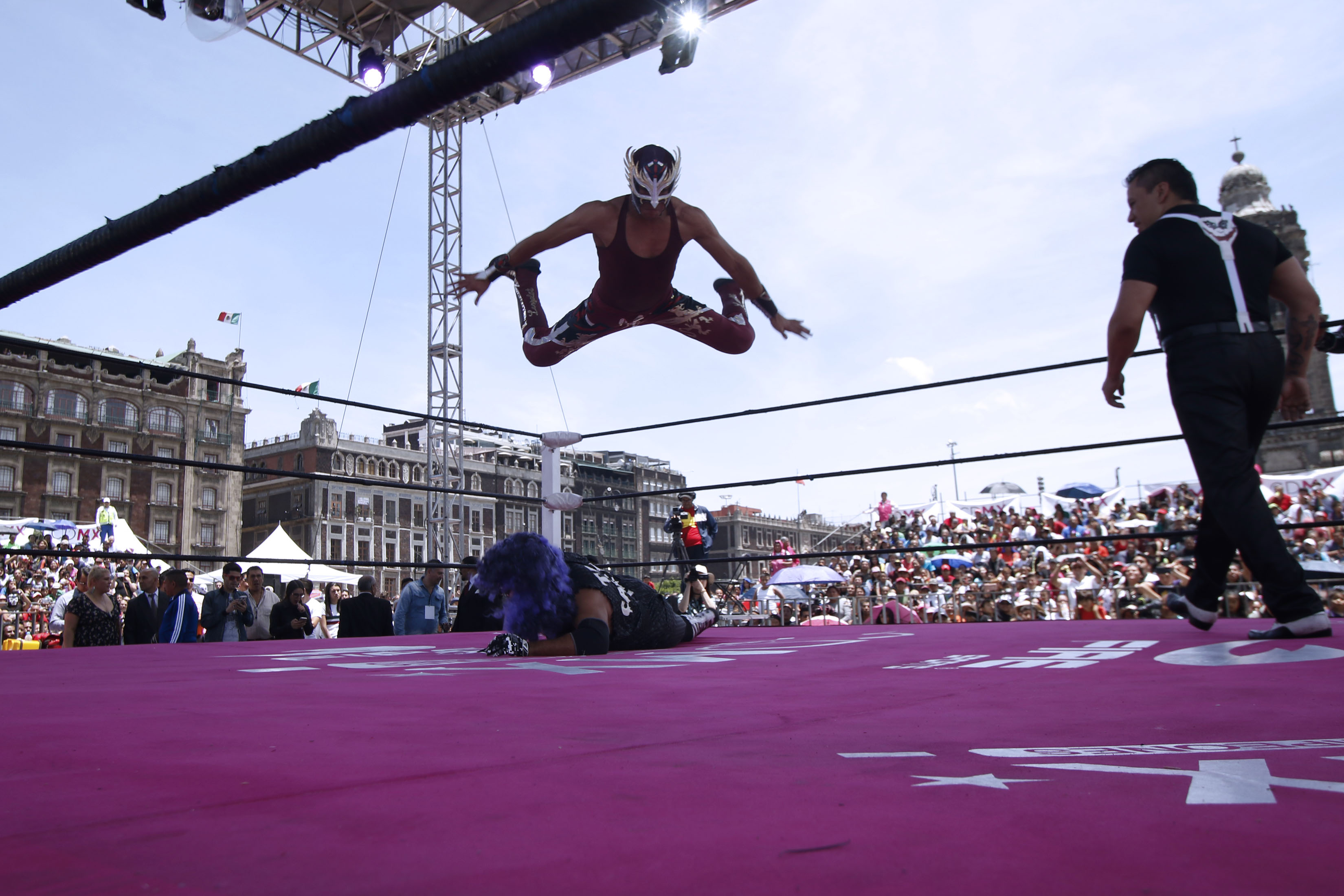
- Lanzeloth performing a dive

Personal information
- Born: October 10, 1995 (age 30) Tulancingo, Hidalgo, Mexico

Professional wrestling career
- Ring name(s): Eclipse Jr. Eclipse Vengador Jr. Lanzeloth; Lancelot
- Trained by: Super Crazy; Taz El Feroz
- Debut: September 8, 2009

Lanzeloth (born October 10, 1995) is a Mexican professional wrestler competing in Pro Wrestling Noah as a freelancer. He previously competed for Lucha Libre AAA Worldwide (AAA), where he is a former holder of the AAA World Cruiserweight Championship. From 2019 through 2022, he used the ring name Eclipse Jr. before reverting to his Lanzeloth name. His real name is not a matter of public record, as is often the case with masked wrestlers in Mexico where their private lives are kept a secret from the professional wrestling fans. Lanzeloth is a nephew of Super Crazy, Taz El Feroz and Crazy Boy and the younger brother of Dinastía.

== Professional wrestling career ==
On October 1, 2017, at Héroes Inmortales XI, Lanzeloth won the AAA World Cruiserweight Championship in a ten-way match. He lost it to Australian Suicide on January 26, 2018, at Guerra de Titanes.

On March 9, 2023, at Noah Star Navigation 2023, Lanzeloth made his Noah debut, teaming with Super Crazy and Extreme Tiger where they defeated Yo-Hey, Seiki Yoshioka and Alejandro.

== Championships and accomplishments ==
- Desastre Total Ultraviolento
  - DTU Nexo Championship (1 time) – with Rocky Lobo
- Lucha Libre AAA Worldwide
  - AAA World Cruiserweight Championship (1 time)
