= Kinya Okada =

Japanese professional wrestler (born 1992)

Personal information
- Born: November 17, 1992 (age 33) Osaka, Japan

Professional wrestling career
- Ring name: Kinya Okada
- Billed height: 178 cm (5 ft 10 in)
- Billed weight: 103 kg (227 lb)
- Trained by: Katsuhiko Nakajima; Takashi Sugiura
- Debut: December 7, 2018
- Retired: May 31, 2023

Kinya Okada (岡田 欣也, Okada Kinya; born 17 November 1992) is a retired Japanese professional wrestler. Nicknamed "Infinite Beast Warrior", he is most known for his time in the Japanese promotion Pro Wrestling Noah under his real name. He also made appearances in All Japan Pro-Wrestling (AJPW), New Japan Pro-Wrestling (NJPW) and Pro Wrestling Zero1. His contract with Pro Wrestling Noah was terminated on May 31, 2023.

== Professional wrestling career ==
=== Pro Wrestling Noah (2018–2023) ===
Kinya Okada made his professional wrestling debut for Pro Wrestling Noah on 7 December 2018 losing to Yoshiki Inamura. He spent his first few matches losing to Yoshiki Inamura. On December 13, on day 4 on the Winter Navigation tour, Okada teamed with Yoshiki Inamura losing to Yo-Hey and Hayata. On December 16, at Great Voyage 2018 in Yokohama Vol. 2, Okada and Inamura was defeated by Lin Dong Xuan and Mizuki Watase. On December 24, at NOAHful Gift 2018, Okada took part in a three-way match that also involved Kaito Kiyomiya and Kenoh but lost. Later that night, Okada took part in the Christmas Battle Royal but was unsuccessful in getting the win.

Okada scored his first victory on February 24, 2019, on day 4 of the Navigation For Progress tour, in a 5-on-5 elimination match in which he teamed with Akitoshi Saito, Masao Inoue, Takashi Sugiura and Yoshiki Inamura against Hooligans (Cody Hall, Kazma Sakamoto, Maybach Taniguchi, Mitsuya Nagai and Yuji Hino), though he was eliminated first by Taniguchi.

Throughout 2019 and 2020, Okada continued to lose the majority of his matches, occasionally winning tag team bouts. On October 18, 2020, at the Muhammad Yone 25th Anniversary event, Okada and Yoshiki Inamura went to a 15-minute time limit draw. Ten days later, on day 2 of the Premium Prelude tour, Okada finally won his first ever singles match as he defeated Yasutaka Yano, in Yano's debut match.

On June 6, 2021, Okada and Junta Miyawaki teamed up to defeat Toy Kojima and Yuki Iino in the opening bout of CyberFight Festival 2021. From June 13 to 24, on the YouTube series "NOAH the HOME", Okada went through a series of seven singles bout, all of which he lost against Shuhei Taniguchi, Daisuke Harada, Atsushi Kotoge, Muhammad Yone, Ikuto Hidaka, Masa Kitamiya and lastly Kaito Kiyomiya.

On January 8, 2022, Okada team up with Daiki Inaba, Daisuke Harada, Hajime Ohara and Yoshiki Inamura to face Chaos (Hirooki Goto, Tomohiro Ishii, and Yoshi-Hashi), Master Wato and Ryusuke Taguchi on night 3 of Wrestle Kingdom 16, en event co-promoted with New Japan Pro-Wrestling (NJPW). On April 30, at Majestic, he teamed with Inamura in a losing effort to Naomichi Marufuji and Satoshi Kojima. On June 12, Okada teamed with Kai Fujimura to defeat Toy Kojima and Yuya Koroku in the opening bout of CyberFight Festival 2022. On August 5, Okada entered the N-1 Victory tournament, where he went on to lose all of his seven matches.

== Personal life ==
On October 20, 2023, Okada was arrested alongside Yasutaka Yano on suspicion of molesting a young woman on April 16.
