= Maybach Taniguchi =

Japanese professional wrestler (born 1976)

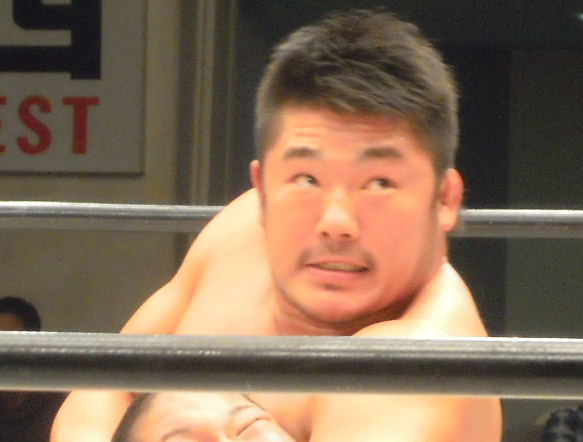
- Taniguchi in December 2010

Personal information
- Born: Shuhei Taniguchi; October 18, 1976 (age 50) Kurayoshi City, Tottori Prefecture, Japan

Professional wrestling career
- Ring name(s): Shuhei Taniguchi; Super Saiya-jin Son Goku; Maybach Taniguchi; King Tany
- Billed height: 1.82 m (6 ft 0 in)
- Billed weight: 105 kg (231 lb)
- Debut: December 24, 2005

Shuhei Taniguchi (谷口 周平, Taniguchi Shūhei; born October 18, 1976) is a Japanese professional wrestler who has worked for Pro Wrestling Noah since his debut in December 2005. He is also known by the ring name Maybach Taniguchi (マイバッハ谷口, Maibahha Taniguchi), under which he portrays a villainous masked character.

== Professional wrestling career ==
=== Amateur background ===
Shuhei Taniguchi first started competitive wrestling when he was in high school. Like fellow Pro Wrestling Noah wrestlers Takashi Sugiura and Tamon Honda before him, Shuhei represented the Japanese armed forces in amateur wrestling. He greatly excelled in amateur wrestling, becoming highly decorated and making it all the way to the All Japan championships, the biggest stage for the sport, before deciding to turn pro.

=== Pro Wrestling Noah ===
Taniguchi joined the Pro Wrestling Noah dojo on May 5, 2005, and spent many months training. He finally debuted along with Atsushi Aoki, Ippei Ota, and Akihiko Ito on December 24, 2005, as part of Noah's annual Christmas Eve Noahful Gift in Differ show. Taniguchi's team for his match actually won, making him the first and, to date, only rookie to not lose his debut match in Noah. On February 26, 2006, in just his fourth match, Shuhei Taniguchi picked up his first direct win, pinning fellow rookie Atsushi Aoki with a German suplex hold. Aoki himself had just pinned Ota the day before. It was clear that Taniguchi was seen as the ace of his dojo class, most likely because of his background and heavyweight status. On March 20 Noah announced an eight-man single-elimination tournament to determine the number contender for Jun Akiyama's GHC Heavyweight Championship. Shuhei was one of the eight wrestlers chosen, but lost in the first round to eventual winner Masao Inoue.

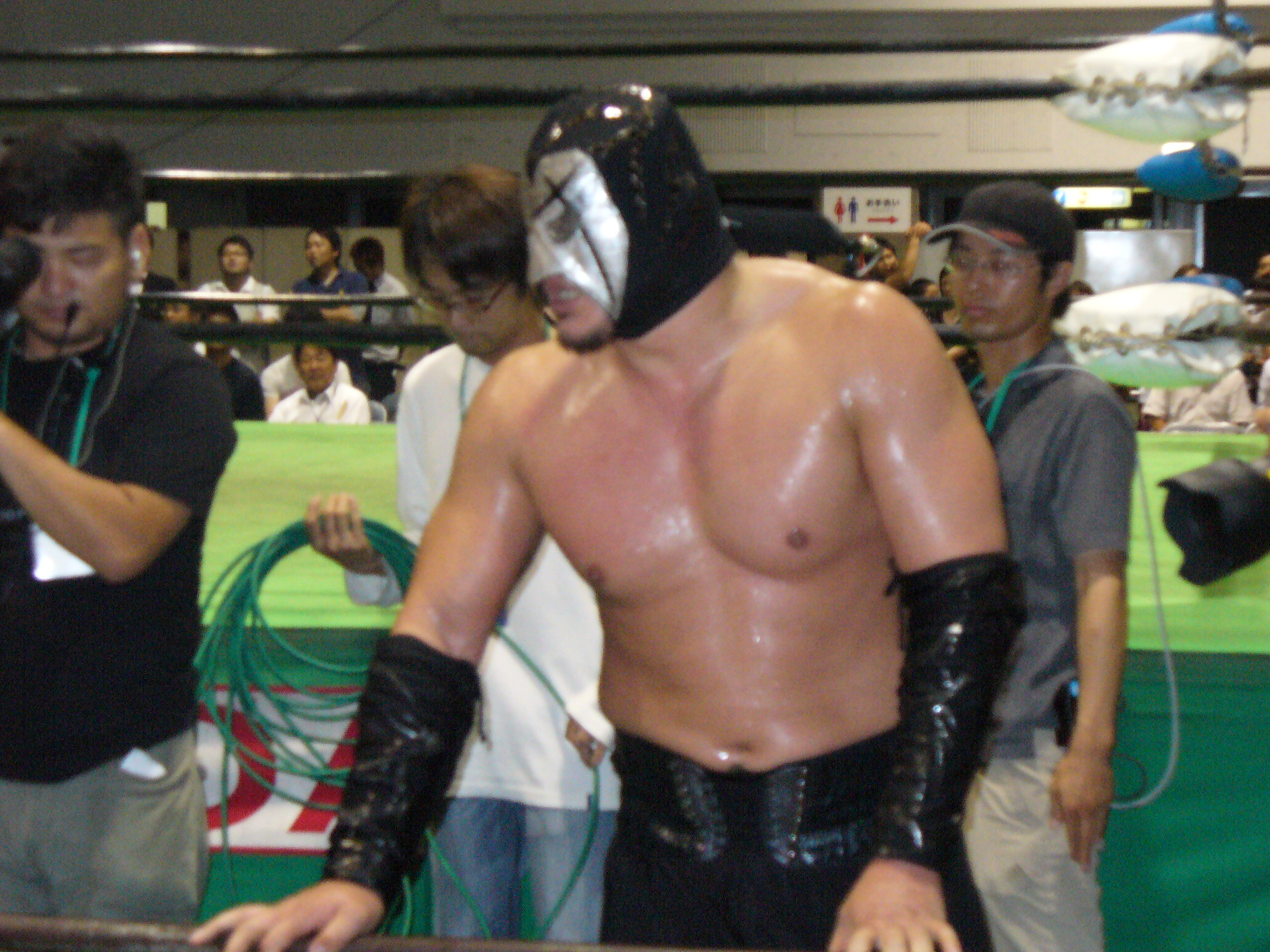
Maybach Taniguchi in June 2012

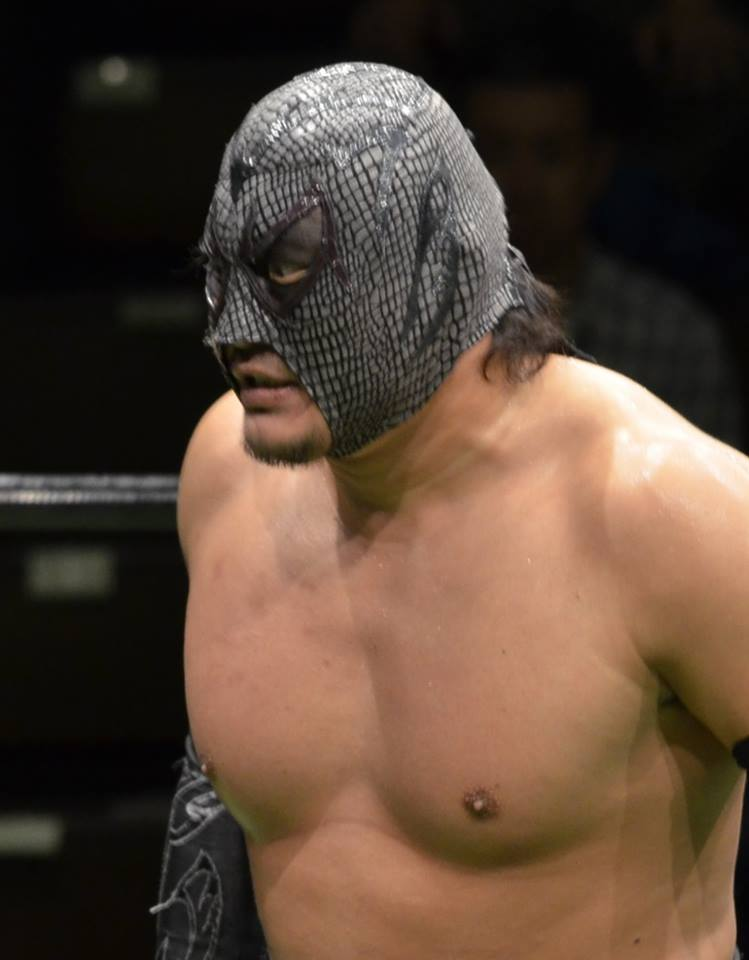
Maybach Taniguchi in May 2015

In early 2012 he turned on his friend and tag partner Go Shiozaki and then joined No Mercy. He then transformed himself into a stronger and more vicious wrestler and changed his name to "Maybach Taniguchi". He also defeated Muhammad Yone and has been on a winning streak defeating Yone, Kento Miyahara etc. He became the next challenger to Takeshi Morishima's GHC Heavyweight Title by brutally attacking him after he just defended his title with Naomichi Marufuji. On October 8, Taniguchi and Kenta defeated Magnus and Samoa Joe to win the GHC Tag Team Championship for the first time. They lost the title to Akitoshi Saito and Go Shiozaki just eighteen days later. In January 2013, Taniguchi debuted a new partner, Maybach Taniguchi, Jr. On February 9, Taniguchi turned on No Mercy leader Kenta, stole his GHC Heavyweight Championship belt and aligned himself with the New Japan Pro-Wrestling stable Chaos, represented in Noah by Takashi Iizuka, Toru Yano and Yujiro Takahashi. On March 10, Taniguchi was defeated by Kenta in a match for the GHC Heavyweight Championship. On March 31, Taniguchi faced his former protégé, Maybach Taniguchi, Jr., in a singles match. After unmasking his opponent as Takahiro Suwa, Taniguchi pinned him for the win. On April 13, Taniguchi and Yujiro Takahashi entered the 2013 Global Tag League, defeating Kenta and Yoshihiro Takayama in their opening match, with Taniguchi pinning the reigning GHC Heavyweight Champion for the win. However, Taniguchi and Takahashi managed to win only one of their three remaining matches in the tournament, failing to qualify for the finals. On May 11, Taniguchi took part in his trainer Kenta Kobashi's retirement match at Final Burning in Budokan, where he, Go Shiozaki, Kenta and Yoshinobu Kanemaru were defeated by Kobashi, Jun Akiyama, Keiji Mutoh and Kensuke Sasaki. After being unmasked by Katsuyori Shibata on December 7, Taniguchi announced his "third form", debuting a new all black mask on December 14. On January 5, 2014, Taniguchi formed a new stable, later named Choukibou-gun, with Kenoh and Takeshi Morishima. On January 25, Taniguchi and Morishima defeated TMDK (Mikey Nicholls and Shane Haste), with help from Kenoh and new stablemate Hajime Ohara, to win the GHC Tag Team Championship. On February 3, Taniguchi was defeated by Kenta in a No Disqualification grudge match between the two former partners. On May 31, Taniguchi and Morishima lost the GHC Tag Team Championship to Masato Tanaka and Takashi Sugiura.

Following Morishima's retirement from professional wrestling, Taniguchi entered the GHC Heavyweight Championship picture in May 2015, challenging Minoru Suzuki. On June 9, Taniguchi was unmasked during a tag team match, where he and Yoshihiro Takayama defeated Suzuki and Takashi Iizuka. Taniguchi received his title shot on June 15, but was defeated by Suzuki. On January 31, 2016, Taniguchi voluntarily removed his mask to become one of the leading figures in Noah's war with the Suzuki-gun stable. He has since worked unmasked, though retaining the Maybach Taniguchi name. In early June, Taniguchi represented Noah in the Lucha Libre World Cup in Mexico. Team Noah, made up of Taniguchi, Naomichi Marufuji and Taiji Ishimori, finished fourth in the tournament. On July 30, Taniguchi put his mask back on to attack new GHC Heavyweight Champion, Suzuki-gun's Takashi Sugiura, setting himself up as his first title challenger. On August 25, Taniguchi unsuccessfully challenged Sugiura for the GHC Heavyweight Championship.

On December 3, Taniguchi and Go Shiozaki defeated K.E.S. (Davey Boy Smith Jr. and Lance Archer) to win the GHC Tag Team Championship. They lost the title to Kenoh and Masa Kitamiya on January 21, 2017. On the February 24 show in Korakuen Hall following Naomichi Marufuji's match against Atsushi Kotoge, Taniguchi came out to shake hands and form a partnership with Marufuji despite their heated past, including Marufuji defeating Taniguchi on the January 9 show via knockout. On April 14, Taniguchi and Marufuji defeated Kenoh and Takashi Sugiura to become the new GHC Tag Team Champions. On May 4, Taniguchi and Marufuji defeated Atsushi Kotoge and Go Shiozaki in the finals to win the 2017 Global Tag League. On August 26, Taniguchi and Marufuji lost the GHC Tag Team Championship to Kotoge and Shiozaki. In 2019, he reverted to his old ring name "Shuhei Taniguchi" and formed a team with Kaito Kiyomiya.

== Personal life ==
Taniguchi married former professional wrestler Mika Nishio in 2012. In February 2016, Nishio announced she was pregnant with the couple's first child.

== Championships and accomplishments ==
- Pro Wrestling Illustrated

- PWI ranked him #169 of the top 500 singles wrestlers in the PWI 500 in 2017

- Pro Wrestling Noah

- GHC Tag Team Championship (6 times) – with Kenta (1), Takeshi Morishima (1), Go Shiozaki (1), Naomichi Marufuji (1), Yuji Hino (1), and Takashi Sugiura (1)
- Arukas Cup 6-Man Tag Tournament (2015) – with Maybach Blue Justice and Maybach Don
- Global Tag League (2017) – with Naomichi Marufuji
- Mauritius Cup (2007)
- Global Tag League Fighting Spirit Award (2010) – with Takashi Sugiura
