= Masa Kitamiya =

Japanese wrestler (born 1988)

Personal information
- Born: Mitsuhiro Kitamiya; October 27, 1988 (age 38) Tonami, Toyama, Japan

Professional wrestling career
- Ring name(s): Masa Kitamiya; Momoyama Gakuin Dai Mitsuhiro Kitamiya
- Billed height: 1.72 m (5 ft 7 1/2 in)
- Billed weight: 103 kg (227 lb)
- Trained by: Kensuke Sasaki; Masa Saito
- Debut: September 25, 2011

Mitsuhiro Kitamiya (北宮 光洋, Kitamiya Mitsuhiro; born November 27, 1988) is a Japanese professional wrestler signed to Pro Wrestling Noah. Kitamiya's ring name Masa Kitamiya (マサ北宮, Masa Kitamiya) is a tribute to former professional wrestler Masa Saito. Kitamiya also wears a similar ring attire to Saito as tribute.

== Early life ==
Kitamiya was an amateur wrestler throughout high school, and went on to be the captain of his college amateur team.

== Professional wrestling career ==
=== Kensuke Office/Diamond Ring (2011–2014) ===
Kitamiya joined Kensuke Office in early 2011 and made his debut later that year on September 25, losing to Satoshi Kajiwara.

=== Pro Wrestling Noah (2012–present) ===
Kitamiya made his debut for Pro Wrestling Noah alongside Diamond Ring representative and NOAH regular Katsuhiko Nakajima in a losing effort to Naomichi Marufuji and Taiji Ishimori. For the next year, Kitamiya regularly competed in NOAH undercard matches against fellow Diamond Ring wrestlers, losing all of them. On September 18, 2013, Kitamiya earned the first win of his career, defeating Hitoshi Kumano. Kitamiya participated in the 2014 NTV G+ Cup Junior Heavyweight Tag League alongside Kumano, with the two finishing last in their block with just one win and two points after they defeated Jinzo and Rocky Lobo. In late 2014, Kitamiya graduated from junior heavyweight to heavyweight.

On January 10, 2015, Kitamiya began a five match series, with the fifth match being against NOAH veteran and former GHC Heavyweight Champion Takeshi Morishima, in a losing effort. Following the match, Kitamiya surprised many and joined the Choukibou-gun stable.

In the 2015 Global Tag League, Kitamiya was scheduled to team with Morishima until the latter announced his retirement. Morishima was replaced with Super Crazy, with the team finishing last in their block with zero points. On August 19, Kitamiya teamed up with his fellow Choukibou-gun stablemates, Hajime Ohara and Kenoh to participate in the Arukas Cup Six Man Tag Tournament, but they were eliminated in the first round after failing to defeat Brave (Naomichi Marufuji, Katsuhiko Nakajima) and Hitoshi Kumano). Kitamiya participated in the 2015 Global League. He finished the tournament last with 2 points, with his only win coming against Takashi Iizuka by DQ. Kitamiya left Choukibou-Gun on December 24, when Naomichi Marufuji disbanded all stables in NOAH in order to unite the roster against the invading Suzuki-Gun stable.

On February 25, Kitamiya made his debut for NJPW at Lion's Gate Project 1, losing to Yuji Nagata in the main event. Kitamiya teamed with Katsuhiko Nakajima and Maybach Taniguchi at We Are Suzuki-gun 2, losing to NJPW's Hiroyoshi Tenzan, Satoshi Kojima and Juice Robinson.

On April 10, Kitamiya defeated Hitoshi Kumano, announcing afterwards that he would now be going under the ring name "Masa Kitamiya", as tribute to former professional wrestler and Kitamiya's childhood hero, Masa Saito, soon after adopting aspects of Saito's moveset and a similar attire. From April 24 to May 3, Kitamiya and Nakajima participated in the 2016 Global Tag League, finishing the tournament with 6 points and second in their block after a loss to Suzuki-gun (Shelton Benjamin and Takashi Sugiura) cost them a place in the finals. On July 16, Kitamiya and Nakajima unsuccessfully challenged Naomichi Marufuji and Toru Yano for the GHC Tag Team Championship. Kitamiya again competed for NJPW on August 14 at the G1 Climax 26 final show, teaming with fellow NOAH representatives Go Shiozaki, Maybach Taniguchi and Katsuhiko Nakajima to defeat Katsuyori Shibata, Yuji Nagata, Hiroyoshi Tenzan and Manabu Nakanishi. On August 25, Kitamiya scored the biggest win of his career, pinning former GHC Heavyweight Champion Go Shiozaki. Later on in that night, Kitamiya attacked Takashi Sugiura and delivered a Saito Suplex before challenging him to a match for the GHC Heavyweight Championship. On September 4, Kitamiya pinned Sugiura in a tag team match. Kitamiya failed to defeat Sugiura on September 23, with Sugiura pinning him after an Olympic Qualifying Slam from the top rope to retain. From November 3 to November 23, Kitamiya participated in the 2016 2016 Global League, defeating Takashi Sugiura, Davey Boy Smith, Jr., Kaito Kiyomiya, and Alejandro Saez, but losing to Go Shiozaki and Muhammad Yone. Despite that, Kitamiya remained at the top of his block and defeated Naomichi Marufuji to advance to finals, finishing the tournament with five wins and two losses. Kitamiya faced A Block winner Minoru Suzuki in the finals, losing after outside interference from Suzuki-Gun. On December 3, Kitamiya challenged tag team partner Katsuhiko Nakajima to a match for the GHC Heavyweight Championship, which Nakajima accepted. Kitamiya unsuccessfully challenged Nakajima on December 24.

On January 21, 2017, Kitamiya and Kenoh defeated Go Shiozaki and Maybach Taniguchi to become the new GHC Tag Team Champions. On February 24, Kenoh turned on Kitamiya to form a new alliance with Takashi Sugiura, which led to the two being stripped of the title. On March 11, 2018, Kitamiya and Nakajima defeated 50FP (Quiet Storm and Mohammad Yone) to win the GHC Tag Team Championship for the first time as a team and the second time for Kitamiya individually. They lost the titles on April 29 against Go Shiozaki and Kaito Kiyomiya, but regained them on May 29, only to lose them on July 28 to Akitoshi Saito and Naomichi Marufuji. On September 2, Kitamiya unsuccessfully challenged Takashi Sugiura for the GHC Heavyweight Championship.

== Championships and accomplishments ==
- Pro Wrestling Illustrated
  - Ranked No. 93 of the top 500 singles wrestlers in the PWI 500 in 2026
- Pro Wrestling Noah
  - GHC Tag Team Championship (9 times) – with Kenoh (1), Katsuhiko Nakajima (3), Kaito Kiyomiya (1), Michael Elgin (1), Daiki Inaba (1) and Takashi Sugiura (2)
  - N-1 Victory (2025)
  - NTV G+ Cup Jr. Heavyweight Tag League Fighting Spirit Prize (2014) – with Hitoshi Kumano
