= List of NJPW Strong episodes =

This is a list of NJPW Strong episodes including episode number, location, venue and that night's main event as part of New Japan Pro-Wrestling's New Japan Pro-Wrestling of America (NJoA) subsidiary. The episodes are branded, usually 3–4 weeks at a time, to mimic the normal touring schedule of the main promotion. Prior to September 2021, other episodes before these events were mainly branded as "Road to" shows.

All dates, venues and main events are per the "results" page on the official NJPW website.

== 2020 ==
No.	Broadcast Date	Location	Venue	Main event
1	August 7, 2020	Port Hueneme, California	Oceanview Pavilion	Tama Tonga vs. Brody King in a New Japan Cup 2020 USA First Round Match
2	August 14, 2020	Port Hueneme, California	Oceanview Pavilion	KENTA vs. Jeff Cobb in a New Japan Cup 2020 USA Semi Final Match
3	August 21, 2020	Port Hueneme, California	Oceanview Pavilion	KENTA vs. David Finlay in the New Japan Cup USA 2020 Final Match.
4	August 28, 2020	Port Hueneme, California	Oceanview Pavilion	Chase Owens vs. PJ Black
5	September 4, 2020	Port Hueneme, California	Oceanview Pavilion	Jay White vs. Flip Gordon
6	September 11, 2020	Port Hueneme, California	Oceanview Pavilion	KENTA vs. Jeff Cobb
7	September 18, 2020	Port Hueneme, California	Oceanview Pavilion	Guerrillas Of Destiny (Tama Tonga & Tanga Loa) vs. ACH & Alex Zayne
8	September 25, 2020	Port Hueneme, California	Oceanview Pavilion	Blake Christian vs. Adrian Quest in a Lion's Break Crown First Round Match
9	October 2, 2020	Port Hueneme, California	Oceanview Pavilion	Bullet Club (Chase Owens, Hikuleo, Jay White and KENTA) vs. David Finlay, Jeff Cobb, Misterioso, and Rocky Romero
10	October 9, 2020	Port Hueneme, California	Oceanview Pavilion	ACH, David Finlay, Jeff Cobb, Karl Fredericks, Rocky Romero and TJP vs. Bullet Club (Chase Owens, Hikuleo, Jay White, KENTA, Tama Tonga & Tanga Loa) in a 12 Man Tag Team Elimination Battle Royal
11	October 17, 2020	Port Hueneme, California	Oceanview Pavilion	David Finlay and Jeff Cobb vs. Chase Owens and KENTA
12	October 23, 2020	Port Hueneme, California	Oceanview Pavilion	Jay White vs. Rocky Romero
13	October 30, 2020	Port Hueneme, California	Oceanview Pavilion	Bullet Club (Hikuleo, KENTA, Tama Tonga & Tanga Loa) defeated Alex Zayne, David Finlay, Misterioso & PJ Black
14	November 6, 2020	Port Hueneme, California	Oceanview Pavilion	JR Kratos and Rust Taylor vs. Jeff Cobb and Rocky Romero
15	November 13, 2020	Port Hueneme, California	Oceanview Pavilion	Tama Tonga vs. PJ Black
16	November 20, 2020	Port Hueneme, California	Oceanview Pavilion	KENTA vs. David Finlay in an IWGP United States Heavyweight Championship #1 Contendership Briefcase Match
17	November 27, 2020	Port Hueneme, California	Oceanview Pavilion	Danny Limelight, JR Kratos, Rust Taylor and Tom Lawlor defeated Fred Rosser, Jeff Cobb, PJ Black and Rocky Romero
18	December 4, 2020	Port Hueneme, California	Oceanview Pavilion	ACH, Brody King, David Finlay, Juice Robinson and Karl Fredericks vs. Bullet Club (Hikuleo, Jay White, KENTA, Tama Tonga & Tanga Loa) in a Ten Man Tag Team Elimination Match
19	December 12, 2020	Port Hueneme, California	Oceanview Pavilion	Jay White vs. Karl Fredericks
20	December 18, 2020	Port Hueneme, California	Oceanview Pavilion	KENTA vs. Brody King in a IWGP United States Heavyweight Title #1 Contendership Briefcase Match (14:16)
21	December 25, 2020	Port Hueneme, California	Oceanview Pavilion	Jay White vs. Rocky Romero (rebroadcast of the October 23 match)

== 2021 ==
No.	Date	Location	Venue	Main event
22	January 1, 2021	Port Hueneme, California	Oceanview Pavilion	Chris Dickinson, Danny Limelight and JR Kratos vs. Brody King and The Riegel Twins (Logan Riegel & Sterling Riegel)
23	January 15, 2021	Port Hueneme, California	Oceanview Pavilion	Bullet Club (El Phantasmo, Hikuleo and KENTA) vs. ACH, Blake Christian and Fred Rosser
24	January 22, 2021	Port Hueneme, California	Oceanview Pavilion	Ren Narita vs. Bateman
25	January 29, 2021	Port Hueneme, California	Oceanview Pavilion	Fred Rosser, Lio Rush and TJP vs. Bullet Club (El Phantasmo, Hikuleo & KENTA)
26	February 5, 2021	Port Hueneme, California	Oceanview Pavilion	Rey Horus vs. TJP
27	February 12, 2021	Port Hueneme, California	Oceanview Pavilion	Chris Dickinson and Danny Limelight vs. Ren Narita and TJP
28	February 19, 2021	Port Hueneme, California	Oceanview Pavilion	El Phantasmo vs. Lio Rush
29	February 26, 2021	Port Hueneme, California	Oceanview Pavilion	Jon Moxley (c) vs. KENTA for the IWGP United States Heavyweight Championship
30	March 5, 2021	Port Hueneme, California	Oceanview Pavilion	Lio Rush vs. Rocky Romero in a New Japan Cup USA 2021 Qualifying Match
31	March 12, 2021	Port Hueneme, California	Oceanview Pavilion	Fred Rosser vs. JR Kratos in a New Japan Cup USA 2021 Qualifying Match
32	March 19, 2021	Port Hueneme, California	Oceanview Pavilion	Brody King (w/ Logan Riegel and Sterling Riegel) vs. Bateman in a New Japan Cup USA 2021 Qualifying Match
33	March 26, 2021	Port Hueneme, California	Oceanview Pavilion	David Finlay and Karl Fredericks vs. Danny Limelight and Tom Lawlor
34	April 2, 2021	Port Hueneme, California	Oceanview Pavilion	Team Filthy (Chris Dickinson, JR Kratos and Tom Lawlor) vs. Brody King and The Riegel Twins (Logan Riegel and Sterling Riegel)
35	April 9, 2021	Port Hueneme, California	Oceanview Pavilion	Brody King vs. Chris Dickinson in a New Japan Cup USA 2021 First Round Match
36	April 16, 2021	Port Hueneme, California	Oceanview Pavilion	Brody King vs. Lio Rush in a New Japan Cup USA 2021 Semi-Final Round Match
37	April 23, 2021	Port Hueneme, California	Oceanview Pavilion	Tom Lawlor vs. Brody King New Japan Cup USA 2021 Final Match to win the vacant NJPW STRONG Openweight Championship
38	April 30, 2021	Port Hueneme, California	Oceanview Pavilion	Karl Fredericks vs. Clark Connors
39	May 7, 2021	Port Hueneme, California	Oceanview Pavilion	Chris Dickinson and Jon Moxley vs. Ren Narita and Yuji Nagata
40	May 14, 2021	Port Hueneme, California	Oceanview Pavilion	Team Filthy (Chris Dickinson, Danny Limelight, JR Kratos and Tom Lawlor) vs. Brody King, Clark Connors, Karl Fredericks and TJP in an Eight Man Elimination Tag Team Match
41	May 21, 2021	Port Hueneme, California	Oceanview Pavilion	Fred Rosser vs. Hikuleo in a No Disqualification Match
42	May 28, 2021	Port Hueneme, California	Oceanview Pavilion	Tom Lawlor (w/Danny Limelight and JR Kratos) (c) vs. Chris Dickinson for the NJPW STRONG Openweight Championship
43	June 4, 2021	Port Hueneme, California	Oceanview Pavilion	Karl Fredericks and Satoshi Kojima vs. Team Filthy (Danny Limelight and JR Kratos)
44	June 11, 2021	Port Hueneme, California	Oceanview Pavilion	Fred Yehi and Wheeler YUTA vs. Jordan Clearwater & Misterioso
45	June 18, 2021	Port Hueneme, California	Oceanview Pavilion	Satoshi Kojima vs. JR Kratos
46	June 25, 2021	Port Hueneme, California	Oceanview Pavilion	Tom Lawlor (c) (w/ JR Kratos) vs. Karl Fredericks for the NJPW STRONG Openweight Championship
47	July 2, 2021	Port Hueneme, California	Oceanview Pavilion	Fred Rosser vs. Bateman
48	July 9, 2021	Port Hueneme, California	Oceanview Pavilion	Josh Alexander vs. Rocky Romero
49	July 16, 2021	Port Hueneme, California	Oceanview Pavilion	VLNCE UNLTD (Brody King and Chris Dickinson) vs. Team Filthy (Danny Limelight & JR Kratos) in a Tag Team Turbulence Tournament Opening Round Match
50	July 23, 2021	Port Hueneme, California	Oceanview Pavilion	Tom Lawlor (w/ JR Kratos) (c) vs. Satoshi Kojima for the NJPW STRONG Openweight Championship
51	July 30, 2021	Port Hueneme, California	Oceanview Pavilion	The Good Brothers (Doc Gallows and Karl Anderson) vs. VLNCE UNLTD (Brody King and Chris Dickinson) in the Tag Team Turbulence Tournament Final Round Match
52	August 6, 2021	Port Hueneme, California	Oceanview Pavilion	Team Filthy (Danny Limelight and JR Kratos) vs. West Coast Wrecking Crew (Jorel Nelson and Royce Isaacs)
53	August 13, 2021	Port Hueneme, California	Oceanview Pavilion	Karl Fredericks and Lio Rush vs. Team Filthy (Danny Limelight and Tom Lawlor)
54	August 20, 2021	Port Hueneme, California	Oceanview Pavilion	West Coast Wrecking Crew (Jorel Nelson and Royce Isaacs) (w/ JR Kratos) vs. VLNCE UNLTD (Brody King and Chris Dickinson)
55	August 27, 2021	Port Hueneme, California	Oceanview Pavilion	Juice Robinson, Lio Rush and VLNCE UNLTD (Brody King and Chris Dickinson) vs. Team Filthy (Jorel Nelson, JR Kratos, Royce Isaacs and Tom Lawlor)
56	September 3, 2021	Port Hueneme, California	Oceanview Pavilion	Hikuleo vs. Matt Morris
57	September 10, 2021	Port Hueneme, California	Oceanview Pavilion	Ren Narita vs. Karl Fredericks
58	September 15, 2021	Long Beach, California	Thunder Studios	Hikuleo vs. Juice Robinson in a Tables Match
59	September 25, 2021	Long Beach, California	Thunder Studios	Ren Narita vs. Fred Rosser
60	October 2, 2021	Long Beach, California	Thunder Studios	Tom Lawlor (c) vs. Lio Rush for the NJPW STRONG Openweight Championship
61	October 9, 2021	Garland, Texas	Curtis Culwell Center	Jay White vs. Robbie Eagles
62	October 16, 2021	Garland, Texas	Curtis Culwell Center	Will Ospreay vs. Karl Fredericks
63	October 23, 2021	Garland, Texas	Curtis Culwell Center	Juice Robinson vs. Hikuleo in a Bull Rope Match
64	30 October 2021	Garland, Texas	Curtis Culwell Center	Suzuki-gun (Lance Archer and Minoru Suzuki) vs. Team Filthy (Royce Isaacs and Tom Lawlor)
65	6 November 2021	Philadelphia, Pennsylvania	2300 Arena	Clark Connors and Ren Narita vs. The United Empire (TJP and Will Ospreay)
66	November 13, 2021	Philadelphia, Pennsylvania	2300 Arena	Minoru Suzuki vs. Chris Dickinson
67	November 20, 2021	Philadelphia, Pennsylvania	2300 Arena	TJP vs. Clark Connors
68	November 27, 2021	Philadelphia, Pennsylvania	2300 Arena	Suzuki-gun (Lance Archer and Minoru Suzuki) vs. Eddie Kingston and Jon Moxley in a Philadelphia Street Fight
69	December 4, 2021	Riverside, California	Riverside Municipal Auditorium	Bullet Club (Hikuleo and Jay White) vs. Alex Zayne and Yuya Uemura
70	December 11, 2021	Riverside, California	Riverside Municipal Auditorium	Tomohiro Ishii vs. Brody King
71	December 18, 2021	Riverside, California	Riverside Municipal Auditorium	Tom Lawlor (c) vs. Fred Rosser for the NJPW STRONG Openweight Championship
72	December 25, 2021	Multiple (rebroadcast matches)	Multiple (rebroadcast matches)	Juice Robinson vs. El Phantasmo (rebroadcast from October 16)

== 2022 ==
No.	Date	Location	Venue	Main event
73	January 8, 2022	Los Angeles, California	The Vermont Hollywood	Eddie Kingston vs. Gabriel Kidd
74	January 15, 2022	Los Angeles, California	The Vermont Hollywood	JONAH defeated David Finlay
75	January 22, 2022	Los Angeles, California	The Vermont Hollywood	Fred Rosser, Rocky Romero and Taylor Rust vs. Team Filthy (Jorel Nelson, Tom Lawlor and Black Tiger) in a Six Man Tag Team Match
76	January 29, 2022	Los Angeles, California	The Vermont Hollywood	Jay White vs. Christopher Daniels
77	February 5, 2022	Seattle, Washington	Washington Hall	Clark Connors vs, TJP
78	February 12, 2022	Seattle, Washington	Washington Hall	FinJuice (David Finlay and Juice Robinson) vs. Bad Dude Tito and JONAH
79	February 19, 2022	Seattle, Washington	Washington Hall	Jay White (w/ Hikuleo) vs. Jay Lethal
80	February 26, 2022	Seattle, Washington	Washington Hall	Tom Lawlor (c) (w/ Jorel Nelson and Royce Isaacs) vs. Taylor Rust for the NJPW STRONG Openweight Championship
81	March 5, 2022	Los Angeles, California	The Vermont Hollywood	Bad Dude Tito and JONAH defeated FinJuice (David Finlay and Juice Robinson)
82	March 12, 2022	Los Angeles, California	The Vermont Hollywood	Jay White vs. SW3RVE
83	March 19, 2022	Los Angeles, California	The Vermont Hollywood	Buddy Matthews vs. Ren Narita
84	March 26, 2022.	Los Angeles, California	The Vermont Hollywood	Team Filthy (Danny Limelight, Jorel Nelson, JR Kratos, Royce Isaacs and Tom Lawlor) vs. Adrian Quest, Clark Connors, Fred Rosser, Taylor Rust and The DKC in a Ten Man Tag Team Elimination Match
85	April 2, 2022	Tampa, Florida	St. Petersburg Coliseum	Tom Lawlor (c) (w/ Black Tiger and JR Kratos) vs. Clark Connors for the NJPW STRONG Openweight Championship
86	April 9, 2022	Tampa, Florida	St. Petersburg Coliseum	Jay White vs, Chris Sabin
87	April 23, 2022	Tampa, Florida	St. Petersburg Coliseum	Buddy Matthews vs. Yuya Uemura
88	April 30, 2022	Tampa, Florida	St. Petersburg Coliseum	Jay Lethal vs. Ren Narita
89	May 7, 2022	Dallas, Texas	Fairmont Hotel	Team Filthy (JR Kratos, Royce Isaacs and Tom Lawlor) vs. Alex Coughlin, Fred Rosser and The DKC
90	May 13, 2022	Los Angeles, California	The Vermont Hollywood	Jay White vs, Hikuleo in a U-S-of-Jay Open Challenge Series Match
91	May 21, 2022	Los Angeles, California	The Vermont Hollywood	United Empire (Aaron Henare, Great-O-Khan and TJP) vs. Brody King, Mascara Dorada and Taylor Rust in a Six Man Tag Team Match
92	May 28, 2022	Los Angeles, California	The Vermont Hollywood	United Empire (Jeff Cobb, Kyle Fletcher and Mark Davis) (w/ Aaron Henare, Great-O-Khan and TJP) vs. TMDK (Bad Dude Tito, JONAH and Shane Haste) in a Six Man Tag Team Match
93	June 4, 2022	Los Angeles, California	The Vermont Hollywood	Tomohiro Ishii vs. Big Damo
94	June 11, 2022	Philadelphia, Pennsylvania	2300 Arena	Bullet Club (Doc Gallows, Hikuleo, Jay White, Juice Robinson and Karl Anderson) vs. CHAOS (Chuck Taylor, Rocky Romero and Tomohiro Ishii), Mascara Dorada and Ren Narita in a Ten Man Tag Team Match
95	June 18, 2022	Philadelphia, Pennsylvania	2300 Arena	Hiroshi Tanahashi vs. Chris Dickinson
96	June 25, 2022	Philadelphia, Pennsylvania	2300 Arena	Fred Rosser vs. Tom Lawlor (c) for the NJPW STRONG Openweight Championship
97	July 2, 2022	Philadelphia, Pennsylvania	2300 Arena	Will Ospreay (w/ Kyle Fletcher and Mark Davis) vs. Homicide (w/ Eddie Kingston)
98	July 9, 2022	Los Angeles, California	The Vermont Hollywood	TMDK (Mikey Nicholls and Shane Haste) vs. West Coast Wrecking Crew (Jorel Nelson and Royce Isaacs) in a NJPW Strong Openweight Tag Team Championship Tournament First Round Match (
99	July 16, 2022	Los Angeles, California	The Vermont Hollywood	Aussie Open (Kyle Fletcher and Mark Davis) vs, Dark Order (Alan Angels and Evil Uno) in a NJPW Strong Openweight Tag Team Championship Tournament First Round Match
100	July 23, 2022	Los Angeles, California	The Vermont Hollywood	Christopher Daniels and Yuya Uemura vs. TMDK (Mikey Nicholls and Shane Haste) in a NJPW Strong Openweight Tag Team Championship Tournament Semi Final Match
101	July 30, 2022	Los Angeles, California	The Vermont Hollywood	Bullet Club (Chase Owens, Hikuleo and Jay White) vs. Fred Rosser, Hiroshi Tanahashi and Kevin Knight in a Six Man Tag Team Match
102	August 13, 2022	Charlotte, North Carolina	Grady Cole Center	Aussie Open (Kyle Fletcher and Mark Davis) vs. Christopher Daniels and Yuya Uemura in the NJPW Strong Openweight Tag Team Championship Tournament Final Match
103	August 20, 2022	Charlotte, North Carolina	Grady Cole Center	El Desperado vs. Blake Christian vs. Hiromu Takahashi in a Three Way Match
104	August 27, 2022	Charlotte, North Carolina	Grady Cole Center	Kushida and Ren Narita vs. The WorkHorsemen (Anthony Henry and JD Drake)
105	September 3, 2022	Charlotte, North Carolina	Grady Cole Center	Fred Rosser (c) vs. Fred Yehi for the NJPW Strong Openweight Championship
106	September 10, 2022	Los Angeles, California	The Vermont Hollywood	Aussie Open (Kyle Fletcher and Mark Davis) (c) vs. West Coast Wrecking Crew (Jorel Nelson and Royce Isaacs) for the NJPW Strong Openweight Tag Team Championship
107	September 17, 2022	Los Angeles, California	The Vermont Hollywood	Bullet Club (Chase Owens, Hikuleo, Jay White and Juice Robinson) vs. Kushida, Taylor Rust and Roppongi Vice (Trent Beretta and Rocky Romero) in an Eight Man Tag Team Match
108	September 24, 2022	Los Angeles, California	The Vermont Hollywood	Taiji Ishimori vs. Alan Angels
109	October 1, 2022	Los Angeles, California	The Vermont Hollywood	Fred Rosser (c) vs. TJP for the NJPW Strong Openweight Championship
110	October 8, 2022	Las Vegas, Nevada	Sam's Town Live	Bullet Club (Jay White and Karl Anderson) (w/ Doc Gallows) vs. Homicide and Wheeler Yuta
111	October 15, 2022	Las Vegas, Nevada	Sam's Town Live	Fred Rosser (c) vs. Chris Dickinson for the NJPW Strong Openweight Championship
112	October 22, 2022	Las Vegas, Nevada	Sam's Town Live	Shingo Takagi vs. Rocky Romero
113	October 29, 2022	Las Vegas, Nevada	Sam's Town Live	Tomohiro Ishii vs. Tom Lawlor
114	November 5, 2022	Los Angeles, California	The Vermont Hollywood	Hiroshi Tanahashi vs. Gabriel Kidd
115	November 12, 2022	Los Angeles, California	The Vermont Hollywood	Minoru Suzuki vs. Fred Yehi
116	November 19, 2022	Los Angeles, California	The Vermont Hollywood	Homicide vs. Tom Lawlor
117	November 26, 2022	Los Angeles, California	The Vermont Hollywood	Jay White vs. Fred Rosser
118	December 3, 2022	Los Angeles, California	The Vermont Hollywood	Juice Robinson vs. Blake Christian
119	December 10, 2022	Los Angeles, California	The Vermont Hollywood	Alan Angels, David Finlay and Guerrillas Of Destiny (Hikuleo and Tama Tonga) vs. BULLET CLUB (El Phantasmo and Jay White) and West Coast Wrecking Crew (Jorel Nelson and Royce Isaacs) (w/ Bobby Fish) in an Eight Man Tag Team Match
120	December 17, 2022	Los Angeles, California	The Vermont Hollywood	The Motor City Machine Guns (Alex Shelley and Chris Sabin) (c) vs. Stray Dog Army (Barrett Brown and Misterioso) for the NJPW STRONG Openweight Tag Team Championship.
121	December 24, 2022	Los Angeles, California	The Vermont Hollywood	Fred Rosser (c) vs. JR Kratos for the NJPW STRONG Openweight Championship.
122	December 31, 2022	Multiple (rebroadcast matches)	Multiple (rebroadcast matches)	Jay White vs. Hikuleo (rebroadcast from April 10)

== 2023 ==
No.	Date	Location	Venue	Main event
123	January 7, 2023	Los Angeles, California	The Vermont Hollywood	KENTA vs. Adrian Quest vs. BATEMAN vs. Blake Christian vs. Che Cabrera vs. Christopher Daniels vs. Cody Chun vs. Guillermo Rosas vs. Jakob Austin Young vs. JR Kratos vs. Keita vs. Máscara Dorada vs. Misterioso vs. Rocky Romero vs. The DKC vs. Wheeler Yuta in a STRONG Survivor Match
124	January 14, 2023	Los Angeles, California	The Vermont Hollywood	Jeff Cobb vs. Bad Dude Tito
125	January 21, 2023	Los Angeles, California	The Vermont Hollywood	The Motor City Machine Guns (Alex Shelley and Chris Sabin) (c) vs. Roppongi Vice (Rocky Romero and Trent Beretta) for the NJPW STRONG Openweight Tag Team Championship.
126	January 28, 2023	Los Angeles, California	The Vermont Hollywood	Fred Rosser (c) vs. Peter Avalon for the NJPW STRONG Openweight Championship

== See also ==
- List of NJPW Strong special episodes
- List of AEW Dynamite episodes
- List of AEW Dark episodes
- List of AEW Dark: Elevation episodes
- List of WWE Raw special episodes
- List of WWE SmackDown special episodes
