= Noah Star Navigation 2025 =

2025 Pro Wrestling Noah event

NOAH Star Navigation 2025 (Night 1)
- Promotional poster of the event featuring Ozawa and Kaito Kiyomiya
- Promotion: CyberFight
- Brand: Pro Wrestling Noah
- Date: May 18, 2025
- City: Tokyo, Japan
- Venue: Korakuen Hall
- Attendance: 1,562

Pay-per-view chronology
← Previous; Noah Memorial Voyage in Kokugikan	Next → New Departure

Star Navigation chronology
← Previous; Star Navigation Premium 2025 (Night 3)	Next → Star Navigation (Night 2)

Noah Star Navigation 2025 was a multiple-night professional wrestling event promoted by CyberFight's sub-brand Pro Wrestling Noah. The pay-pre-view nights of the event took place on May 18, June 3 and November 8, 2025, in Tokyo, Japan, at the Korakuen Hall. Broadcasting was made on CyberAgent's AbemaTV online linear television service and CyberFight's streaming service Wrestle Universe.

== Background ==
=== Storylines ===
The event featured professional wrestling matches that resulted from scripted storylines, where wrestlers portrayed villains, heroes, or less distinguishable characters in the scripted events that built tension and culminated in a wrestling match or series of matches.

== Night 1 ==
=== Event ===
The event started with the tag team confrontation between Daiki Odashima and Shuji Kondo, and Mohammed Yone and Shuhei Taniguchi, solded with the victory of the latters.

In the following bout, Atsushi Kotoge and Hajime Ohara picked up a victory over Alejandro and Kai Fujimura in tag team competition. Next up, Masa Kitamiya, Naomichi Marufuji and Takashi Sugiura outmatched Daga, Owadasan and Tetsuya Endo in six-man tag team competition. Endo turned on Team 2000X after the bout concluded and joined forces with Takashi Sugiura. The fourth bout saw Dragón Bane and Alpha Wolf defeat Hayata and Yuto Kikuchi. Next up, Kenoh, Kenta and Ulka Sasaki picked up a victory over Daiki Inaba, Manabu Soya and Saxon Huxley in six-man tag team competition. In the semi main event, Yo-Hey defeated Tadasuke to secure the first successful defense of the GHC Junior Heavyweight Championship in that respective reign.

In the main event, Ozawa defeated Kaito Kiyomiya to secure the fifth consecutive defense of the GHC Heavyweight Championship in that respective reign. After the bout concluded, Tetsuya Endo who turned on Team 2000X unit earlier that night, stepped up as Ozawa's next challenger. Ozawa then called out Sugiura and proposed a number one contendership match for the Heavyweight title. Later the authority officially scheduled a three-way survival bout for the title which was scheduled to occur on June 3, 2025.

=== Results ===
No.	Results	Stipulations	Times
1	Mohammed Yone and Shuhei Taniguchi defeated Daiki Odashima and Shuji Kondo by pinfall	Tag team match	6:17
2	Team Noah (Atsushi Kotoge and Hajime Ohara) defeated All Rebellion (Alejandro and Kai Fujimura) by pinfall	Tag team match	8:17
3	Masa Kitamiya, Naomichi Marufuji and Takashi Sugiura defeated Team 2000X (Daga, Owadasan and Tetsuya Endo) by pinfall	Six-man tag team match	10:29
4	Los Golpeadores (Dragón Bane and Alpha Wolf) defeated Ratel's (Hayata and Yuto Kikuchi) by pinfall	Tag team match	8:28
5	Kenoh, Kenta and Ulka Sasaki defeated Ratel's (Daiki Inaba, Manabu Soya and Saxon Huxley)	Six-man tag team match	14:09
6	Yo-Hey (c) defeated Tadasuke	Singles match for the GHC Junior Heavyweight Championship	10:52
7	Ozawa (c) defeated Kaito Kiyomiya	Singles match for the GHC Heavyweight Championship	23:31
(c) / – the champion(s) heading into the match

== Night 2 ==
NOAH Star Navigation 2025 (Night 2)
- Promotional poster of the event featuring Ozawa, Tetsuya Endo and Takashi Sugiura
- Promotion: CyberFight
- Brand: Pro Wrestling Noah
- Date: June 3, 2025
- City: Tokyo, Japan
- Venue: Korakuen Hall
- Attendance: 1,233

Pay-per-view chronology
← Previous; Star Navigation (Night 1)	Next → New Departure

=== Event ===
The event started with the confrontation between Eita, Shuji Kondo and Black Menso-re, and Masa Kitamiya, Amakusa and Shuhei Taniguchi, solded with the victory of the latter team.

Next up, Hayata, Saxon Huxley and Yuto Kikuchi picked up a victory over Kenta, Super Crazy and Daiki Odashima in six-man tag team competition. The third bout saw Naomichi Marufuji, Dragón Bane and Alpha Wolf outmatch the teams of Kaito Kiyomiya, Alejandro and Kai Fujimura, and Daga, Tadasuke and Owadasan in three-way six-man tag team competition.

In the fourth bout, Atsushi Kotoge defeated Super Delfin in a special singles confrontation which portraited Kotoge's 20th Anniversary since his professional wrestling debut. Next up, Manabu Soya and Daiki Inaba defeated Kenoh and Ulka Sasaki, ending the latter teams' reign at 31 days and one defense. In the semi main event, Yo-Hey defeated Junta Miyawaki to secure the second successful defense of the GHC Junior Heavyweight Championship in that respective reign.

In the main event, Ozawa defeated Tetsuya Endo and Takashi Sugiura in a Three-way survival match to secure the sixth consecutive defense of the GHC Heavyweight Championship in that respective reign. After the bout concluded, Takashi Sugiura joined Team 2000X.

=== Results ===
No.	Results	Stipulations	Times
1	Masa Kitamiya, Amakusa and Shuhei Taniguchi defeated Eita, Shuji Kondo and Black Menso-re by pinfall	Six-man tag team match	6:57
2	Ratel's (Hayata, Saxon Huxley and Yuto Kikuchi) defeated Kenta, Super Crazy and Daiki Odashima by pinfall	Six-man tag team match	9:20
3	Naomichi Marufuji and Los Golpeadores (Dragón Bane and Alpha Wolf) defeated All Rebellion (Kaito Kiyomiya, Alejandro and Kai Fujimura) and Team 2000X (Daga, Tadasuke and Owadasan) by pinfall	Three-way tag six-man tag team match	8:23
4	Atsushi Kotoge defeated Super Delfin by pinfall	Singles match	9:53
5	Ratel's (Manabu Soya and Daiki Inaba) defeated Kenoh and Ulka Sasaki (c) by pinfall	Tag team match for the GHC Tag Team Championship	13:47
6	Yo-Hey (c) defeated Junta Miyawaki by pinfall	Singles match for the GHC Junior Heavyweight Championship	13:33
7	Ozawa (c) defeated Tetsuya Endo and Takashi Sugiura by pinfall	Three-way survival match for the GHC Heavyweight Championship	24:38
(c) / – the champion(s) heading into the match

== Night 3 ==
NOAH Star Navigation 2025 (Night 3)
- Promotional poster of the event featuring Kenta and Yoshiki Inamura
- Promotion: CyberFight
- Brand: Pro Wrestling Noah
- Date: November 8, 2025
- City: Tokyo, Japan
- Venue: Korakuen Hall
- Attendance: 1,560

Pay-per-view chronology
← Previous; Wrestle Odyssey	Next → Cross Over in Sendai

Star Navigation chronology
← Previous; Star Navigation (Night 2)	Next → Last

=== Event ===
The event started with the six-man tag team confrontation between Kaito Kiyomiya, Mohammed Yone and Harutoki, and Naomichi Marufuji, Kenoh and Jack Morris, solded with the victory of the latter team.

Next up, Dragon Bane and Alpha Wolf picked up a victory over the teams of Manabu Soya and Saxon Huxley, and Ulka Sasaki and Tetsuya Endo in three-way tag team competition. After the bout concluded, Alpha Wolf challenged Bane to a GHC National Championship match which was scheduled to take place at the New Year 2026 event. The third bout saw Kai Fujimura defeat Junta Miyawaki in the first rounds of the 2025 Jr. Grand Prix tournament. Next up, Shuji Kondo defeated Black Menso-re, Ninja Mack defeated Alejandro and Hiromu Takahashi defeated Daiki Odashima in the same stage of the competition.

In the semi main event, WWE NXT's Hank Walker and Tank Ledger defeated Masa Kitamiya and Takashi Sugiura to win the GHC Tag Team Championship, ending the latter team's reign at 89 days and no defenses. After the bout concluded, Naomichi Marufuji and Kenoh stepped up as the new challengers, not sooner than Kitamiya and Sugiura expressing their disapproval. The situation rendered a number one contendership match between Kenoh and Marufuji and Kitamiya and Sugiura on further notice as demanded by champions Walker and Ledger.

In the main event, Yoshiki Inamura defeated Kenta to win the GHC Heavyweight Championship, ending the latter's reign at 111 days and two defenses. After the bout concluded, Inamura nominated Kaito Kiyomiya as the next title challenger. The bout for the title was scheduled for the Noah Cross Over event from November 21, 2025.

=== Results ===
No.	Results	Stipulations	Times
1	Naomichi Marufuji, Kenoh and Jack Morris defeated All Rebellion (Kaito Kiyomiya and Harutoki) and Mohammed Yone by pinfall	Six-man tag team match	7:14
2	Los Golpeadores (Dragon Bane and Alpha Wolf) defeated Ratel's (Manabu Soya and Saxon Huxley) and Ulka Sasaki and Tetsuya Endo by pinfall	Three-way tag team match	5:40
3	Kai Fujimura defeated Junta Miyawaki by pinfall	First round match in the Jr. Grand Prix tournament	6:53
4	Shuji Kondo defeated Black Menso-re by pinfall	First round match in the Jr. Grand Prix tournament	0:57
5	Ninja Mack defeated Alejandro by pinfall	First round match in the Jr. Grand Prix tournament	8:29
6	Hiromu Takahashi defeated Daiki Odashima by pinfall	First round match in the Jr. Grand Prix tournament	12:56
7	Hank and Tank (Hank Walker and Tank Ledger) defeated Team 2000X (Masa Kitamiya and Takashi Sugiura) (c) by pinfall	Tag team match for the GHC Tag Team Championship	15:30
8	Yoshiki Inamura defeated Kenta (c) by pinfall	Singles match for the GHC Heavyweight Championship	17:30
(c) / – the champion(s) heading into the match
