= Noah New Departure 2025 =

Pro Wrestling Noah event in Tokyo

NOAH New Departure 2025
- Promotional poster for Night 1 featuring Ozawa and Kenoh
- Promotion: CyberFight
- Brand: Pro Wrestling Noah
- Date: July 19–20, 2025
- City: Tokyo, Japan
- Venue: Korakuen Hall
- Attendance: 1,596 (Night 1); 1,592 (Night 2)

Pay-per-view chronology
← Previous; Star Navigation 2025 (Night 2)	Next → N-1 Victory

NOAH New Departure 2025 was a two-night professional wrestling event promoted by CyberFight's sub-brand Pro Wrestling Noah. It took place on July 19 and 20, 2025, in Tokyo, Japan, at the Korakuen Hall. The event will air on CyberAgent's AbemaTV online linear television service and CyberFight's streaming service Wrestle Universe.

== Storylines ==
Both of the nights featured a total of twenty-one professional wrestling matches that resulted from scripted storylines, where wrestlers portrayed villains, heroes, or less distinguishable characters in the scripted events that built tension and culminated in a wrestling match or series of matches.

== Results ==
=== Night 1 ===
The first night of the event took place on July 19, 2025. It started with the tag team confrontation between Kenta and Junta Miyawaki, and Naomichi Marufuji and Daiki Odashima, solded with the victory of the latters. Next up, Alpha Wolf, Dragon Bane and Super Crazy picked up a victory over Shuhei Taniguchi, Hajime Ohara and Will Kroos in six-man tag team competition. The third bout saw Manabu Soya, Daiki Inaba, Saxon Huxley and Yuto Kikuchi outmatch Ulka Sasaki, Amakusa, Eita and Black Menso-re in eight-man tag team competition. In the fourth bout, Takashi Sugiura and Daga defeated Tetsuya Endo and Atsushi Kotoge. During the event, Go Shiozaki returned to the promotion after an injury. In the fifth bout, Jack Morris, Tadasuke, Owadasan and Knull defeated Kaito Kiyomiya, Galeno, Alejandro and Harutoki in eight-man tag team competition. Knull was the mystery partner revealed on the very night of the event as the newest member of Team 2000X at the time. In the semi main event, Yo-Hey defeated Hayata to secure the fourth consecutive defense of the GHC Junior Heavyweight Championship in that respective reign. After the bout concluded, New Japan Pro Wrestling's Hiromu Takahashi appeared and challenged Yo-Hey to a direct confrontation. A tag team match was set to occur on the second night of the event from July 20.

In the main event, Kenoh defeated Ozawa to win the GHC Heavyweight Championship, ending the latter's reign at 199 days and six defenses.

July 19
No.	Results	Stipulations	Times
1	Naomichi Marufuji and Daiki Odashima defeated Kenta and Junta Miyawaki by pinfall	Tag team match	12:51
2	Los Golpeadores (Alpha Wolf and Dragon Bane) and Super Crazy defeated Shuhei Taniguchi, Hajime Ohara and Will Kroos by pinfall	Six-man tag team match	9:36
3	Ratel's (Manabu Soya, Daiki Inaba, Saxon Huxley and Yuto Kikuchi) defeated Ulka Sasaki, Amakusa, Eita and Black Menso-re by pinfall	Eight-man tag team match	9:45
4	Team 2000X (Takashi Sugiura and Daga) defeated Tetsuya Endo and Atsushi Kotoge by pinfall	Tag team match	9:12
5	Team 2000X (Jack Morris, Tadasuke, Owadasan and Knull) (with Yoshi Tatsu) defeated All Rebellion (Kaito Kiyomiya, Galeno, Alejandro and Harutoki) by pinfall	Eight-man tag team match	11:59
6	Yo-Hey (c) defeated Hayata by pinfall	Singles match for the GHC Junior Heavyweight Championship	14:55
7	Kenoh defeated Ozawa (c) by referee stoppage	Singles match for the GHC Heavyweight Championship	22:11
(c) / – the champion(s) heading into the match

=== Night 2 ===
The second night of the event took place on July 20, 2025. It started with the tag team confrotnation between Ulka Sasaki and Junta Miyawaki, and Mohammed Yone and Super Crazy, solded with the victory of the latters. Next up, Manabu Soya, Daiki Inaba and Saxon Huxley picked up a victory over Kazuyuki Fujita, Will Kroos and Daiki Odashima in six-man tag team competition. The third bout saw Naomichi Marufuji, Eita and Shuji Kondo outmatch Tetsuya Endo, Alpha Wolf and Dragon Bane in six-man tag team competition. After the bout concluded, Eita and Kondo layed a challenge to Bane and Wolf's GHC Junior Heavyweight Tag Team Championship. In the fourth bout, Jack Morris, Tadasuke, Daga, Owadasan and Knull defeated Kaito Kiyomiya, Galeno, Harutoki, Alejandro and Kai Fujimura in ten-man elimination tag team competition. Next up, Hiromu Takahashi and Amakusa picked up a victory over Yo-Hey and Yuto Kikuchi. After the bout concluded, Takahashi challenged Yo-Hey for the GHC Junior Heavyweight Championship.

In the main event, Kenta defeated Kenoh to win the GHC Heavyweight Championship, less than a day after Kenoh won it from Ozawa on the previous day of the event from July 19. After the bout concluded, Kenta received a title challenge from Naomichi Marufuji.

July 20
No.	Results	Stipulations	Times
1	Mohammed Yone and Super Crazy defeated Ulka Sasaki and Junta Miyawaki by pinfall	Tag team match	5:24
2	Ratel's (Manabu Soya, Daiki Inaba and Saxon Huxley) defeated Kazuyuki Fujita, Will Kroos and Daiki Odashima by pinfall	Six-man tag team match	6:42
3	Naomichi Marufuji, Eita and Shuji Kondo defeated Tetsuya Endo and Los Golpeadores (Alpha Wolf and Dragon Bane) by pinfall	Six-man tag team match	8:45
4	Team 2000X (Jack Morris, Tadasuke, Daga, Owadasan and Knull) defeated All Rebellion (Kaito Kiyomiya, Galeno, Harutoki, Alejandro and Kai Fujimura) by pinfall	Ten-man elimination tag team match	13:29
5	Hiromu Takahashi and Amakusa defeated Ratel's (Yo-Hey and Yuto Kikuchi) by pinfall	Tag team match	10:56
6	Kenta defeated Kenoh (c) by pinfall	Singles match for the GHC Heavyweight Championship	28:04
(c) / – the champion(s) heading into the match
