= Kenta Kobayashi =

Japanese professional wrestler (born 1981)

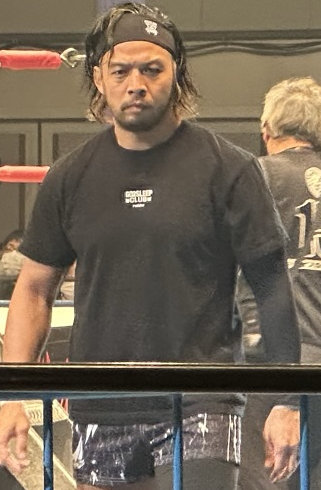
- Kobayashi in 2023

Personal information
- Born: Kenta Kobayashi (小林 健太, Kobayashi Kenta); March 12, 1981 (age 45) Sōka, Saitama, Japan
- Children: 2

Professional wrestling career
- Ring name(s): Halimao; Hideo Itami; Kenta; Kenta Kobayashi
- Billed height: 1.74 m (5 ft 9 in)
- Billed weight: 85 kg (187 lb)
- Billed from: Tokyo, Japan
- Trained by: All Japan Dojo; Kenta Kobashi; Yoshihiro Takayama
- Debut: May 24, 2000

Kenta Kobayashi (小林 健太, Kobayashi Kenta; born March 12, 1981), known mononymously as Kenta (stylised in all caps), is a Japanese professional wrestler. He is signed to Pro Wrestling Noah, where he is the leader of White Raven Sqwad and a former two-time GHC Heavyweight Champion.

Kobayashi started his career in All Japan Pro Wrestling (AJPW), before moving to Pro Wrestling Noah; through Noah's involvement in the Global Professional Wrestling Alliance (GPWA), a global organization of cooperative promotions that allow their competitors to travel abroad to other companies, he has wrestled extensively in American promotion Ring of Honor (ROH). In Noah, he was a two-time GHC Heavyweight Champion, three-time GHC Junior Heavyweight Champion, three-time GHC Junior Heavyweight Tag Team Champion, and one-time GHC Tag Team Champion. He was also the winner of the 2012 Global League and the 2013 Global Tag League tournaments.

He is also well known for his tenure in American promotion WWE where he worked under the name Hideo Itami (ヒデオ・イタミ) in the company's developmental territory NXT and later in their cruiserweight exclusive brand 205 Live. In 2019, he departed from WWE, and in May, appeared for New Japan Pro-Wrestling (NJPW), announcing his participation in that year's G1 Climax and aligned with former tag partner Katsuyori Shibata. He turned on Shibata and joined the Bullet Club, and has since held the Strong Openweight Championship twice and the IWGP Heavyweight Tag Team Championship, NEVER Openweight Championship and the IWGP United States Heavyweight Championship once each. He silently departed from NJPW in January 2025 and returned to Pro Wrestling Noah the following month.

== Early life ==
Kobayashi was born on March 12, 1981, in Sōka, Japan. He trained under Kenta Kobashi and Yoshihiro Takayama.

== Professional wrestling career ==
=== All Japan Pro Wrestling (2000) ===
Prior to wrestling professionally, Kobayashi had a variety of athletic backgrounds, practicing baseball and kickboxing; the latter came to be a strong foundation in his wrestling style often referred to as shoot style. Kobayashi made his professional wrestling debut on May 24, 2000, against future ally and rival, Naomichi Marufuji, in All Japan Pro Wrestling (AJPW) to compete in their junior heavyweight division. He did not remain in the company long as Mitsuharu Misawa, president of AJPW, decided to leave the company following a dispute, leading to Misawa forming his own company, Pro Wrestling Noah.

=== Pro Wrestling Noah ===
==== Early appearances and Burning (2000–2003) ====
One of Misawa's focuses in his new promotion was the junior heavyweight division, which never was treated with high regard in AJPW despite the successes in other promotions. Being sidelined with injuries for the majority of Noah's first year of operation, Kobayashi made his return in July 2001, simply named Kenta.

Kenta's first involvement in a championship situation came when Naomichi Marufuji was forced to vacate the GHC Junior Heavyweight Championship after suffering a knee injury; Kenta entered into the tournament held to determine a new champion. He advanced to the finals by defeating Kotaro Suzuki and Tsuyoshi Kikuchi before losing to Yoshinobu Kanemaru on the Navigation with Breeze Tour in June 2002. Following his relative success in the tournament, Kenta had an increase in his popularity, and he joined his mentor, Kenta Kobashi, in the faction Burning.

==== Junior Heavyweight Championship success (2003–2011) ====
March 1, 2003, saw Kenta team with Naomichi Marufuji for the first time against Makoto Hashi and Yoshinobu Kanemaru in a winning effort. They began teaming regularly as the two entered into a tournament to christen the first GHC Junior Heavyweight Tag Team Champions during the company's Accomplish Our Third Navigation tour; they went to win the tournament by defeating junior heavyweight veterans Jyushin Thunder Liger and Takehiro Murahama in the finals on July 16. While defending the tag team title, Kenta continued his venture in hopes of winning the GHC Junior Heavyweight title once again on November 30, 2003, in an unsuccessful bid against Takashi Sugiura.

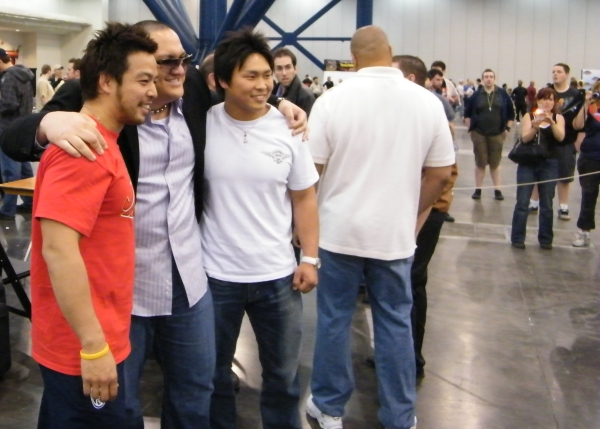
Kenta (far left) with Samoa Joe and Katsuhiko Nakajima

As part of a reward for the way Kenta performed, he earned himself a trial series of seven matches going into the next year, seeing Kenta able to challenge more established stars in an attempt to elevate his status. Kenta began his trial series on the First Navigation tour, beating Juventud Guerrera. This was followed by defeats to Yoshinari Ogawa and Jun Akiyama. The final match of the series was a loss against Marufuji in October. While the series was taking place, Kenta and Marufuji continued defending their title against a number of challengers: El Samurai and Ryusuke Taguchi, Yoshinari Ogawa and Kotaro Suzuki, Suzuki and Ricky Marvin, Marvin and Suwa and, on Noah's first Tokyo Dome show, against Kendo Kashin and Takashi Sugiura. Their reign as champions came to an end in June 2005 after almost two years by Kanemaru and Sugiura after the latter pinned Kenta.

Kenta's first major rivalry in singles competition began in March 2005 following a dispute with SUWA, which led to a series of confrontations between the two, including a violent match that ended in his opponent getting disqualified for assaulting the referee. This led to Kenta getting one more chance to challenge for the Junior Heavyweight title against Yoshinobu Kanemaru at Destiny on July 18, which saw him win the title. He made his first defense two months later against Suwa, then against Kotaro Suzuki as his alter ego, Mushiking Terry. Simultaneously, Kenta began teaming with Katsuyori Shibata as The Takeover, challenging for the GHC Tag Team Championship, the heavyweight version of the company's tag team title.

On March 5, 2006, Kenta faced a major challenge in Kenta Kobashi, which saw him lose following a Burning Hammer. This was followed by a loss of the Junior Heavyweight title on June 4 to Takashi Sugiura. This saw Kenta shift his attention to the GHC Heavyweight Championship, challenging Naomichi Marufuji, losing in a match which won numerous awards and accolades from the wrestling media.

Kenta spent the majority of his 2007 time in Noah wrestling a variety of tag team and six-man tag team matches with protégé Taiji Ishimori and Akitoshi Saito as partners. He saw most of his success with Ishimori as the two had critically acclaimed matches against a wide variety of competitors, including Ring of Honor (ROH) competitors on loan to the company due to the talent exchange agreement, the Global Professional Wrestling Alliance (GPWA), between ROH and Noah: the Briscoe Brothers, Davey Richards, and Bryan Danielson. As Kenta and Ishimori progressed as a unit, they entered the first NTV Junior Heavyweight Tag Team Tournament; in the finals they beat Marufuji and Kota Ibushi to win the tournament. They later challenged the GHC Junior Heavyweight Tag Team Champions, Dragon Gate wrestlers BxB Hulk and Shingo Takagi, in a winning effort before losing them to Yoshinobu Kanemaru and Kotaro Suzuki, only to defeat the team to win the second NTV Junior Heavyweight Tag Team League Tournament.

Following his loss of the tag title, Kenta returned to competing in singles competition by defeating Bryan Danielson for his second GHC Junior Heavyweight Championship, which led to a match with Marufuji, who had won the World Junior Heavyweight Championship, to attempt to unify the titles; the match ended in a sixty-minute draw, keeping the titles in the hands of their respective holder, while gaining favorable reviews for their efforts by the media with some claiming it to be a Match of the Year. Kenta lost the title in February 2009 to rival in their interpromotional rivalry with another member of the GPWA in the Kensuke Office, Katsuhiko Nakajima, only to win it back in the next month. In October, Kobayashi was forced to vacate the title after suffering a knee injury, which would keep him sidelined for over seven months.

Kobayashi made his return from injury on June 6, 2010, losing to Naomichi Marufuji in a GHC Junior Heavyweight Championship number one contender's match. On October 30, 2010, Kenta and Atsushi Aoki defeated Roderick Strong and Eddie Edwards in the finals of a tournament to win the 2010 Nippon TV Cup Junior Heavyweight Tag League. As a result, Kenta and Aoki received a shot at the GHC Junior Heavyweight Tag Team Championship, but were defeated by the champions, New Japan Pro-Wrestling representatives Koji Kanemoto and Tiger Mask, on November 23, 2010. On January 29, 2011, Kenta turned heel and join the Disobey stable with members Muhammad Yone, Yoshinobu Kanemaru and Genba Hirayanagi. Kenta would change his look and attitude. Then on March 5, he turned on Yone, removing him from the group. One week later, he renamed the stable No Mercy. On May 25 Kenta and Yoshinobu Kanemaru defeated Atsushi Aoki and Kotaro Suzuki of the ANMU stable to win the vacant GHC Junior Heavyweight Tag Team Championship. After months of trying to persuade his mentor Yoshihiro Takayama to join No Mercy, on June 26 Takayama turned on his partner Takuma Sano during a tag match against Kenta and Kanemaru and became the fourth member of the group. Kenta and Kanemaru would then make it to the finals of the Junior Tag League on July 30. They lost to Atsushi Aoki and Kotaro Suzuki. Then on August 18, 2011, Kenta and Yoshihiro Takayama won the Noah 2 Day Tag Team Tournament. On August 24, Kenta and Kanemaru successfully defended their tag title against Aoki and Suzuki, who got the shot due to their victory in the Junior Tag League. On September 23, Kenta confronted GHC Heavyweight Champion Go Shiozaki after he defeated Takayama to retain the title. Kenta got a number one contender's match with Takashi Sugiura, which he won on October 10. Kenta and Kanemaru lost the GHC Junior Heavyweight tag title to Aoki and Suzuki on October 16.

==== Transition to the heavyweight division (2011–2013) ====
At Noah's Halloween show on October 31, 2011, Kenta challenged the NJPW team Bad Intentions (Giant Bernard and Karl Anderson) for the GHC Heavyweight Tag Team Championship with Yoshihiro Takayama. The match was set for 2012, but never happened due to injury. In November, Kenta entered Noah's Global Tag League and developed a new submission move he called "Game Over" to help him dispatch heavyweights. Kenta would make it to the finals on November 20, but would lose to Takeshi Morishima. On November 27, he lost to Go Shiozaki in his GHC Heavyweight title shot. In December 2011, Kenta tore his ACL again, forcing him to undergo another surgery to repair it. It was announced that he would be out of action for six to seven months. Tokyo Sports named Kenta the 2011 Technical Wrestler of the Year. Despite his injury, Kenta would stay in Noah and manage No Mercy during his injury. On February 14, 2012, Kenta recruited Shuhei Taniguchi as the fifth member of No Mercy and change his name to Maybach, becoming his mouthpiece and talking for him.

Kenta made his in-ring return on July 22, 2012, losing to Naomichi Marufuji. On October 8, Kenta and Maybach Taniguchi defeated Magnus and Samoa Joe to win the GHC Tag Team Championship for the first time. However, they lost the title to Akitoshi Saito and Go Shiozaki just eighteen days later. On November 23, Kenta won the 2012 Global League.

==== Heavyweight Champion (2013–2014) ====
On January 27, 2013, Kenta defeated Takeshi Morishima for the GHC Heavyweight Championship at Great Voyage 2013. On February 9, Maybach Taniguchi turned on Kenta and stole his Heavyweight Championship belt. The following week, Kenta took part in a South American tour with the Alianza Latinoamericana de Lucha Libre (AULL) promotion, during which he won the Torneo Latino Americano de Lucha Libre, defeating Super Crazy in the finals. On March 10, Kenta defeated Maybach Taniguchi for his first successful defense of the GHC Heavyweight Championship. On April 28, Kenta and Yoshihiro Takayama defeated Katsuhiko Nakajima and Kensuke Sasaki in the finals to win the 2013 Global Tag League. On May 11, Kenta took part in Kenta Kobashi's retirement match at Final Burning in Budokan, where he, Go Shiozaki, Maybach Taniguchi, and Yoshinobu Kanemaru were defeated by Kobashi, Jun Akiyama, Keiji Muto, and Kensuke Sasaki. The following day, Kenta made his second successful defense of the GHC Heavyweight Championship against Takashi Sugiura. On June 2, Kenta defeated New Japan Pro-Wrestling representative and reigning GHC Tag Team Champion Toru Yano for his third successful title defense. Six days later, Kenta was pinned by Yano in a GHC Tag Team Championship match, where he and Yoshihiro Takayama unsuccessfully challenged Yano and Takashi Iizuka. On July 7, Kenta made his fourth successful defense of the GHC Heavyweight Championship against Naomichi Marufuji. Kenta's fifth successful title defense took place on August 4, when he defeated Muhammad Yone. Next Kenta defended his title against the reigning GHC Tag Team Champions, first defeating Shane Haste on September 7 and then Mikey Nicholls on September 16. On October 5, Kenta defeated Diamond Ring representative Katsuhiko Nakajima for his eighth successful title defense. With the win, Kenta became the first wrestler to successfully defend the GHC Heavyweight Championship eight times during a calendar year. On December 7, Kenta defeated New Japan representative and winner of the 2013 Global League, Yuji Nagata, for his ninth successful title defense. Kenta's near one-year long reign ended on January 5, 2014, when he lost the title to Takeshi Morishima in his tenth defense.

On February 3, 2014, Kenta and Maybach Taniguchi's long rivalry culminated in a No Disqualification match, where Kenta was victorious. After Yuji Nagata had defeated Morishima to become the GHC Heavyweight Champion, Kenta received the first shot at the new champion, but was defeated in the title match on February 22. On April 30, Noah held a press conference during which Kenta announced his resignation from the promotion. Kenta wrestled his farewell match on May 17, where he and Naomichi Marufuji defeated Katsuhiko Nakajima and Takashi Sugiura.

==== Sporadic returns (2018, 2023) ====
While still under WWE contract, Kenta made a one-off return to Noah under his WWE ring name of Hideo Itami on September 1, 2018, losing to Naomichi Marufuji at Marufuji's 20th Anniversary show.

On January 2, 2023, Kenta would make another one-night return to team up with Marufuji and challenge Takashi Sugiura and Satoshi Kojima for the GHC Tag Team Championship at New Year 2023, in an unsuccessful effort.

=== Ring of Honor (2005–2009) ===
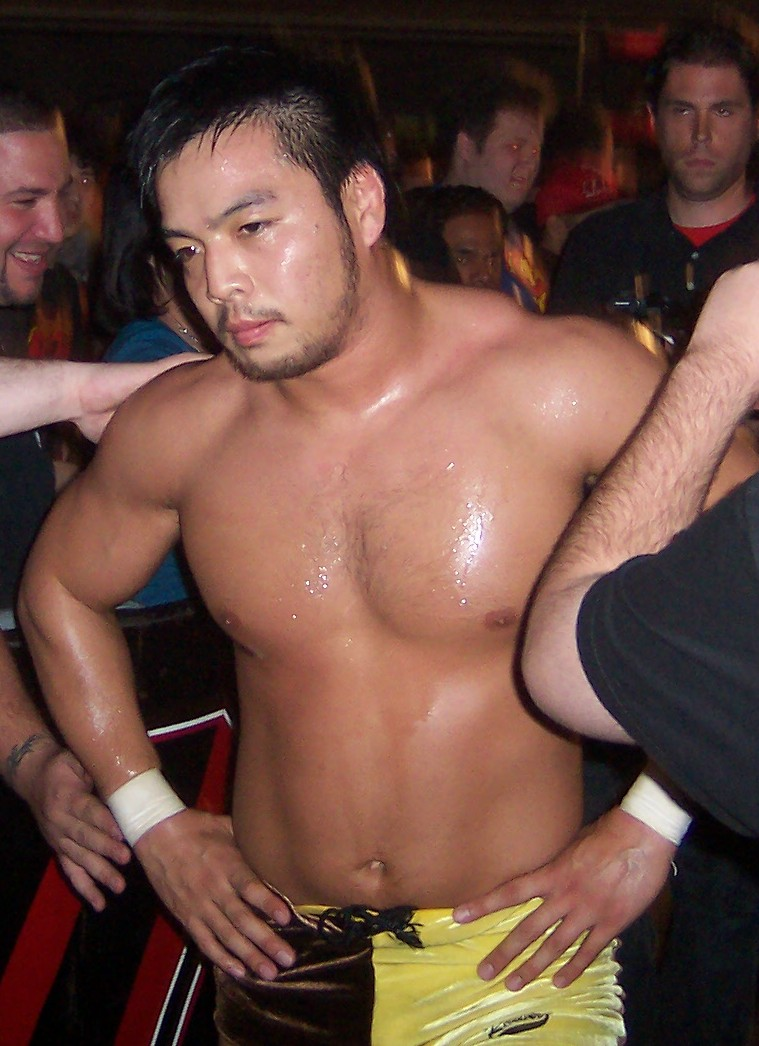
Kenta at an ROH event, September 2008

Aside from competing in Pro Wrestling Noah, Kenta was able to compete abroad in the United States with other participating members of the GPWA. His first appearance in the country was with Ring of Honor at Final Battle 2005, as a fan favorite, defending the GHC Junior Heavyweight title against Low Ki. He returned to the company the following year for Best in the World in New York City on March 25 where he and Naomichi Marufuji defeated the team of Samoa Joe and ROH World champion Bryan Danielson after Kenta connected with his finishing strike, the Go 2 Sleep, on Danielson. Kenta returned for In Your Face featuring him in a three-way match against Joe and Danielson, which ended in similar fashion.

Kenta's first loss in the company came in the form of a tag team match, which saw his partner, Davey Richards, get pinned in a match against the Briscoe Brothers. This led to a series of matches with the two against each other, as well as reluctant partners. At Glory by Honor V: Night 2, Kenta received another match against Danielson for the ROH World title, which saw him submit to Danielson's signature hold, the Cattle Mutilation.

Kenta made his return to Ring of Honor on May 11 of the next year against Delirious in a winning effort. Ring of Honor made its pay per view debut with the show, Respect is Earned, teaming with Nigel McGuinness against Danielson and Takeshi Morishima in a losing effort, after which Kenta spent several months with the company competing against rival, Davey Richards and his contingency, the No Remorse Corps. Kenta made his next appearance on the Glory By Honor VI tour; the first night had him team with the GHC Heavyweight Champion Mitsuharu Misawa against Takeshi Morishima and Naomichi Marufuji, with the match ending in a thirty-minute time limit draw. The following night, Kenta wrestled Misawa for the GHC Heavyweight Championship in a losing effort.

Kenta made his return in 2009 against ROH World Champion, Nigel McGuinness in a losing effort at the company's seventh anniversary show. He returned a few weeks later to challenge Davey Richards once more, as well as make his second pay per view appearance for Take No Prisoners teaming with Tyler Black against Katsuhiko Nakajima and Austin Aries. Kobayashi was scheduled to return to ROH in November 2009, but was forced to cancel the appearances after suffering a knee injury.

=== WWE ===
==== NXT (2014–2017) ====
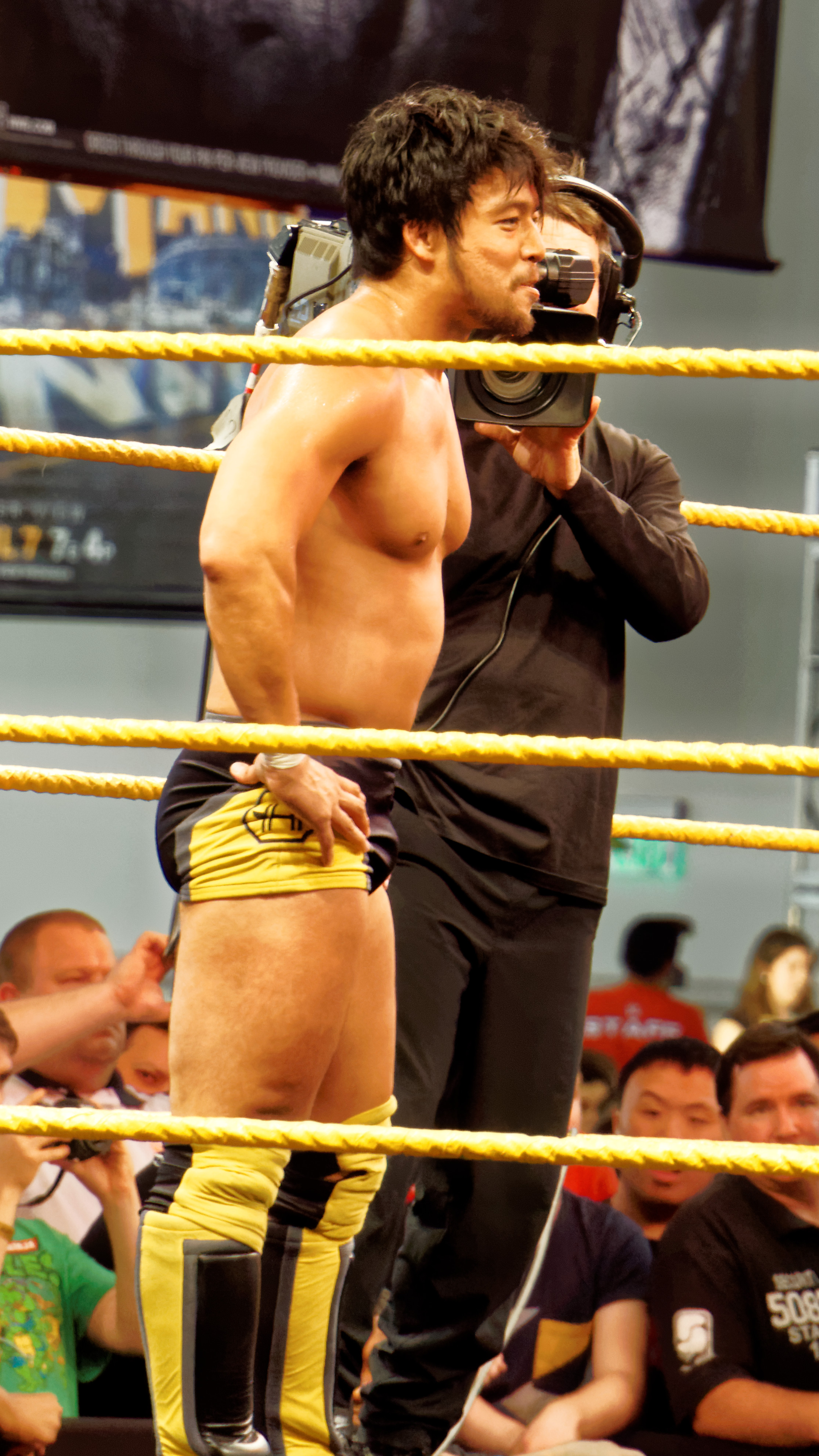
Itami at WrestleMania Axxess, March 2015

On January 27, 2014, Kenta, with Noah's blessing, entered WWE's Performance Center in Orlando, Florida, for a tryout. In a press release, Kenta claimed that he was not after a WWE contract, but only wanted to fulfill a dream and take part in a WWE workout. On June 27, Tokyo Sports reported that Kenta had signed with WWE. His signing was officially announced during an in-ring segment on July 12 in Osaka. Kobayashi relocated to Orlando to resume training at the Performance Center, while also working for WWE's developmental territory NXT.

Kobayashi debuted on September 11 at NXT TakeOver: Fatal 4-Way, introduced by William Regal, where he announced his new ring name, "Hideo Itami", meaning "Hero of Pain", and fended off The Ascension when they interrupted the segment to confront Regal. Itami made his in-ring debut at the following day's tapings of NXT, defeating Justin Gabriel, after which he was attacked by The Ascension. During the following weeks, Itami kept engaging The Ascension in brawls, but continually lost due to the numbers disadvantage; the storyline was that as a newcomer in NXT, Itami did not have any friends in the locker room to help him. This continued until November, when Finn Bálor debuted as Itami's new partner. After weeks of feuding with The Ascension, Itami and Bálor defeated them at NXT TakeOver: R Evolution on December 11. Itami then participated in an NXT Championship number one contender's tournament, defeating Tyler Breeze in the first round, starting a feud between the two. He suffered his first defeat in NXT on January 15, 2015, when he was defeated by Bálor in the semi-finals, thus eliminating him from the tournament. At NXT TakeOver: Rival, Itami defeated Breeze in a rematch. They continued to exchange victories over each other until Itami lost a two-out-of-three falls match to Breeze on the April 1 episode of NXT to end the feud. On March 27, Itami won the WrestleMania Axxess NXT tournament by defeating Adrian Neville and then Finn Bálor to get a spot in the André the Giant Memorial Battle Royal on the pre-show of WrestleMania 31, where he was eliminated by eventual winner Big Show.

On May 20 at NXT TakeOver: Unstoppable, Itami was scheduled to face Finn Bálor and Tyler Breeze in a triple threat match to determine the number one contender for the NXT Championship; however, Itami was ruled out due to injury after an attack he suffered before the event started. This was made as Itami had suffered a legitimate shoulder injury, which required surgery and was expected to sideline him for six months. In January 2016, it was reported that Itami had suffered complications with his shoulder and was "nowhere close to being able to return".

After over a year of inactivity, Itami returned to the ring on June 30, 2016, at an NXT live event, teaming with TM-61 to defeat Samoa Joe, Blake and Tino Sabbatelli in a six-man tag team match. On August 3, Itami made his televised return, defeating Cruiserweight Classic competitor Sean Maluta. At NXT TakeOver: Brooklyn II, Itami confronted Austin Aries, following the latter's match with No Way Jose, exchanging blows before attacking Aries with a GTS. On October 12 at an NXT live event, Itami suffered a neck injury after a botched powerslam from Riddick Moss and would not be able to team with Kota Ibushi in the Dusty Rhodes Tag Team Classic in which he was scheduled to compete. In a video announcement published on October 18, Itami vowed to return to in-ring competition at NXT's first show in Japan on December 3. However, at the event, Itami did not compete but was instead in an in-ring segment alongside William Regal where they talked to the crowd.

Itami made his televised return on April 19, 2017, where he confronted NXT Champion Bobby Roode, before slapping him and executing a GTS. This led to a match at NXT TakeOver: Chicago, in which Itami was unsuccessful in winning the title from Roode. On the June 7 episode of NXT, furious after his loss to Roode, Itami faced Oney Lorcan, which ended in a no-contest after Itami performed three GTSs on Lorcan until Kassius Ohno attempted to save Lorcan, teasing a heel turn and a feud between the pair. On the July 5 episode of NXT, Itami teamed with Ohno in a tag team match against Sanity (Killian Dain and Alexander Wolfe), but lost after Itami refused to tag in Ohno. On the July 26 episode of NXT, Itami faced Ohno in the main event, which ended after Itami intentionally disqualified himself with a low blow to Ohno before viciously attacking and laying him out after two GTSs, followed by a third onto the steel steps, cementing his heel turn. On the August 2 edition of NXT, Itami cut an in-ring promo, demanding respect from the fans. He was interrupted by Aleister Black, who was scheduled to face Kyle O'Reilly in the night's main event. After a stare down between the two, Black hit Itami with Black Mass. Itami attempted to assault Black following the event, but the two were separated by fellow talent. At NXT TakeOver: Brooklyn III, Itami was defeated by Black. In his last NXT match, Itami defeated Fabian Aichner at a live event on December 16.

==== 205 Live and departure (2017–2019) ====
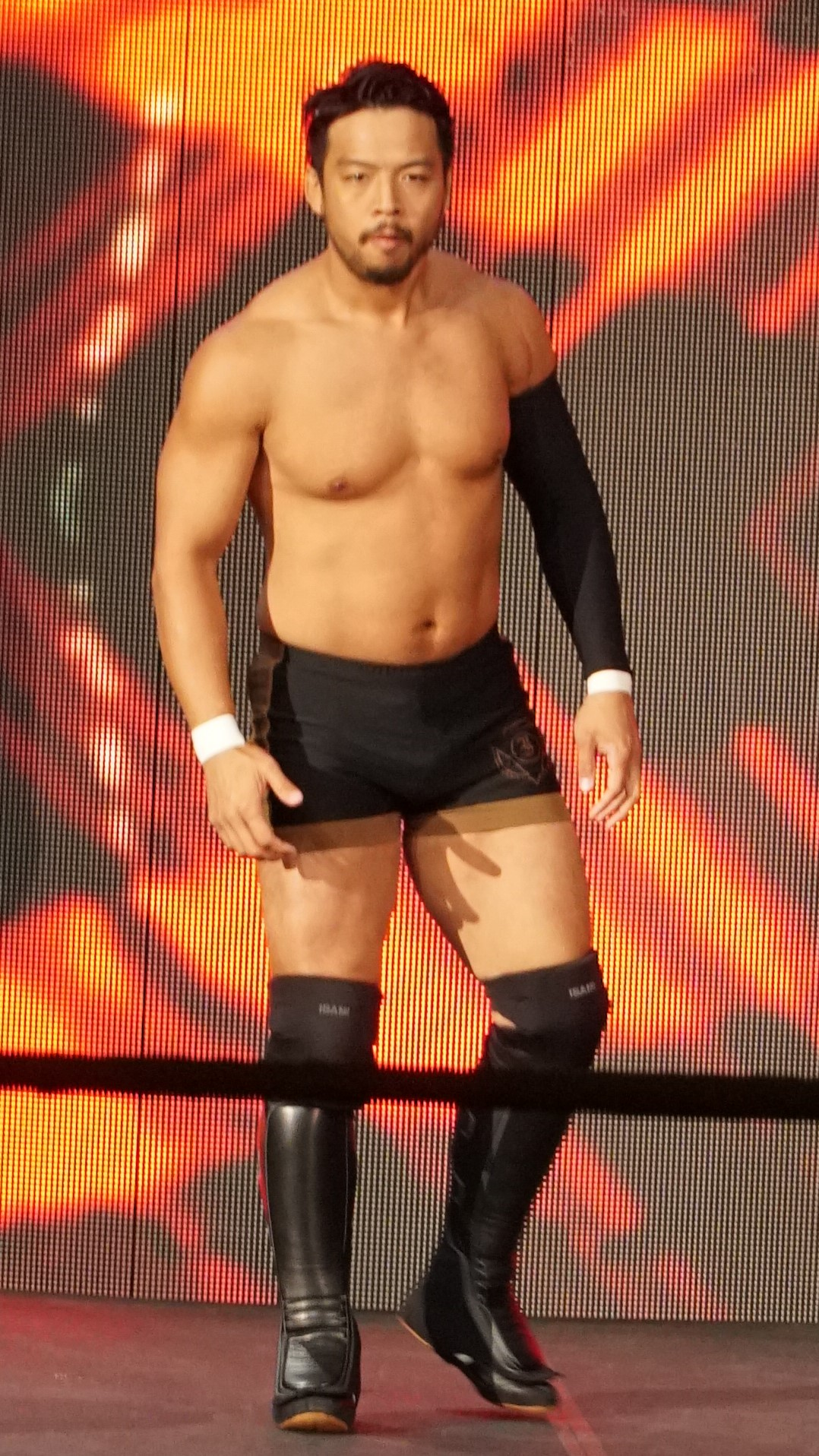
Itami in April 2018

On November 21, 2017, it was announced that Itami would be moving to the main roster as part of the cruiserweight division on 205 Live. On the December 18 episode of Raw, Itami would make his main roster debut, aiding Finn Bálor to fend off and face Curtis Axel and Bo Dallas in a tag team match, which Itami and Bálor would win, turning face in the process. On the December 25 episode of Raw, Itami would defeat The Brian Kendrick, in which Kendrick would suffer an injury following a Go to Sleep by Itami. This would lead to Itami entering a short feud with Kendrick's tag team partner, Gentleman Jack Gallagher.

On the February 6 episode of 205 Live, Itami would be defeated by Roderick Strong in the first round of the WWE Cruiserweight Championship tournament. During the following month, Itami would have a feud with fellow Japanese wrestler Akira Tozawa, Mustafa Ali and was involved into the orbit for Cedric Alexander's Cruiserweight Championship. He participated in a fatal four-way match involving cruiserweight champion Buddy Murphy, Kalisto, and Tozawa at the Royal Rumble, where he lost after being pinned by Murphy.

On January 29, it was reported that Itami requested and was granted his release from the company after a five-year run. This was followed by multiple members of the roster saying goodbye to Itami on social media. On February 4, 2019, the WWE Performance Center YouTube channel that documents the Superstars travel and backstage life released a video chronicling Itami's last week in WWE. The video features Itami working with Daivari and talking about his struggles with learning to speak and understand English. The end of the video sees Hideo walking back to gorilla position and being given a standing ovation from those in the backstage area. On February 22, Kobayashi was officially released by WWE, as the company formally acknowledged his departure on Twitter.

In 2020, when he was working with NJPW, Kenta said that his time with WWE were "the most frustrating days of my life".

=== New Japan Pro-Wrestling (2019–2025) ===
==== Bullet Club and NEVER Openweight Champion (2019–2020) ====
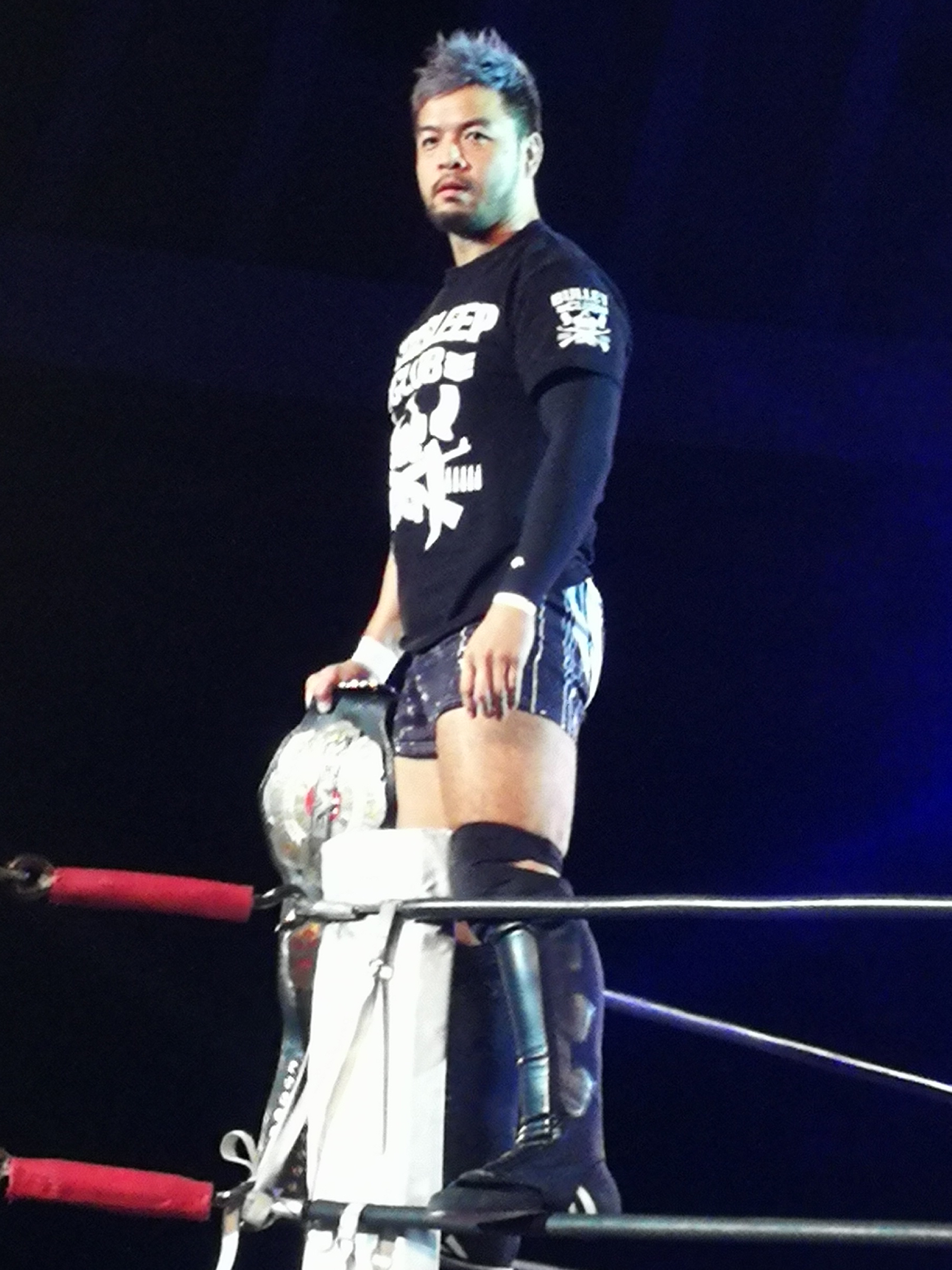
Kenta as the NEVER Openweight Champion in December 2019

Kenta made his surprise debut for New Japan Pro-Wrestling (NJPW) on June 9, 2019, at the Dominion 6.9 in Osaka-jo Hall event as a face, with Katsuyori Shibata as his manager, announcing his participation in the 2019 G1 Climax tournament. Kenta made his in-ring debut for NJPW on July 6, defeating Kota Ibushi as a part of the tournament. Kenta, competing in the A Block of the tournament, stayed undefeated in singles matches for over a month and a half, defeating Hiroshi Tanahashi, Lance Archer, and Evil before suffering his first defeat against IWGP Heavyweight Champion Kazuchika Okada on July 27, as part of the tournament. Kenta would then lose his next four matches against Sanada, Bad Luck Fale, Will Ospreay and Zack Sabre Jr., failing to win the tournament with a final tally of 8 points (four wins and five losses).

On the final night of the tournament, Kenta competed in a six-man tag team match alongside Chaos members Tomohiro Ishii and Yoshi-Hashi against Bullet Club's Bad Luck Fale, Tama Tonga, and Tanga Loa, only to turn on them in the closing moments of the match and assisting the Bullet Club for the victory, turning heel. As Kenta was going to explain his actions, Katsuyori Shibata rushed into the ring and attacked Kenta until the rest of the Bullet Club members ambushed Shibata. At Royal Quest on August 31, Kenta defeated Ishii to win the NEVER Openweight Championship, his first championship in NJPW. The match was criticized because Kobayashi suffered a concussion after a back suplex by Ishii, getting knocked out in the process. However, both continued the match without referee stoppage. He was sent to the hospital after the show. At Destruction in Kagoshima on September 16, Kenta returned and unsuccessfully faced Kota Ibushi for the Tokyo Dome IWGP Heavyweight Championship challenge rights certificate.

At Power Struggle on November 3, Kenta retained his title against Ishii in a rematch. Later in the night, he attacked Hirooki Goto. Kenta lost the NEVER Openweight Championship to Goto at Wrestle Kingdom 14 on January 5, 2020, ending his reign at 127 days with two successful defenses. Later that night, Kenta attacked Tetsuya Naito after his main event match with Kazuchika Okada. Kenta would challenge Naito for both the IWGP Intercontinental and IWGP Heavyweight Championships at The New Beginning in Osaka, where he was defeated.

==== United States Heavyweight Champion (2020–2022) ====
In August, Kenta competed in the inaugural New Japan Cup USA tournament, with the winner receiving a match for the IWGP United States Heavyweight Championship. Kenta defeated Karl Fredericks in the first round, Jeff Cobb in the semi-finals, and David Finlay in the finals to win the tournament. Kenta then competed in the 2020 G1 Climax in the B Block, but failed to win with a final score of 10 points. At Power Struggle on November 7, Kenta successfully retained his Right to Challenge contract for the United States Championship against Hiroshi Tanahashi. He was then due to defend the contract against Juice Robinson at Wrestle Kingdom 15, but Robinson suffered an injury and Satoshi Kojima was named as his replacement. At the event on January 4, 2021, Kenta defeated Kojima to retain the Right to Challenge contract. On the January 29 episode of Strong, Kenta was attacked by United States Champion Jon Moxley. It was then announced that Kenta would receive his championship shot against Moxley at The New Beginning USA on February 26, where he was defeated.

In March, Kenta competed in the New Japan Cup, defeating Juice Robinson and Minoru Suzuki, but losing to Shingo Takagi in the quarter-finals. In July at Wrestle Grand Slam in Tokyo Dome, Kenta competed in the New Japan Ranbo for the provisional KOPW Championship, but the match was won by Bullet Club stablemate Chase Owens. Two months later Kenta competed in the G1 Climax 31 tournament, where he competed in the A Block. Kenta finished the tournament with a total of 12 points, finishing joint 3rd in the block, failing to advance to the finals.

At Power Struggle, Kenta defeated Hiroshi Tanahashi to win the IWGP United States Heavyweight Championship. He would lose the title back to Tanahashi three months later on Night 2 of Wrestle Kingdom 16 in a No disqualification match, where in the match Kenta was bloodily injured.

After his recovery, Kenta was announced to be a part of the G1 Climax 32 tournament in July, where he would compete in the C Block. He finished with 6 points, failing to advance to the semi-finals. In October, Kenta competed in a tournament to crown the first ever NJPW World Television Champion, defeating Hirooki Goto, in the first round. In the following round, Kenta was defeated by Sanada.

==== Championship reigns (2022–2025) ====
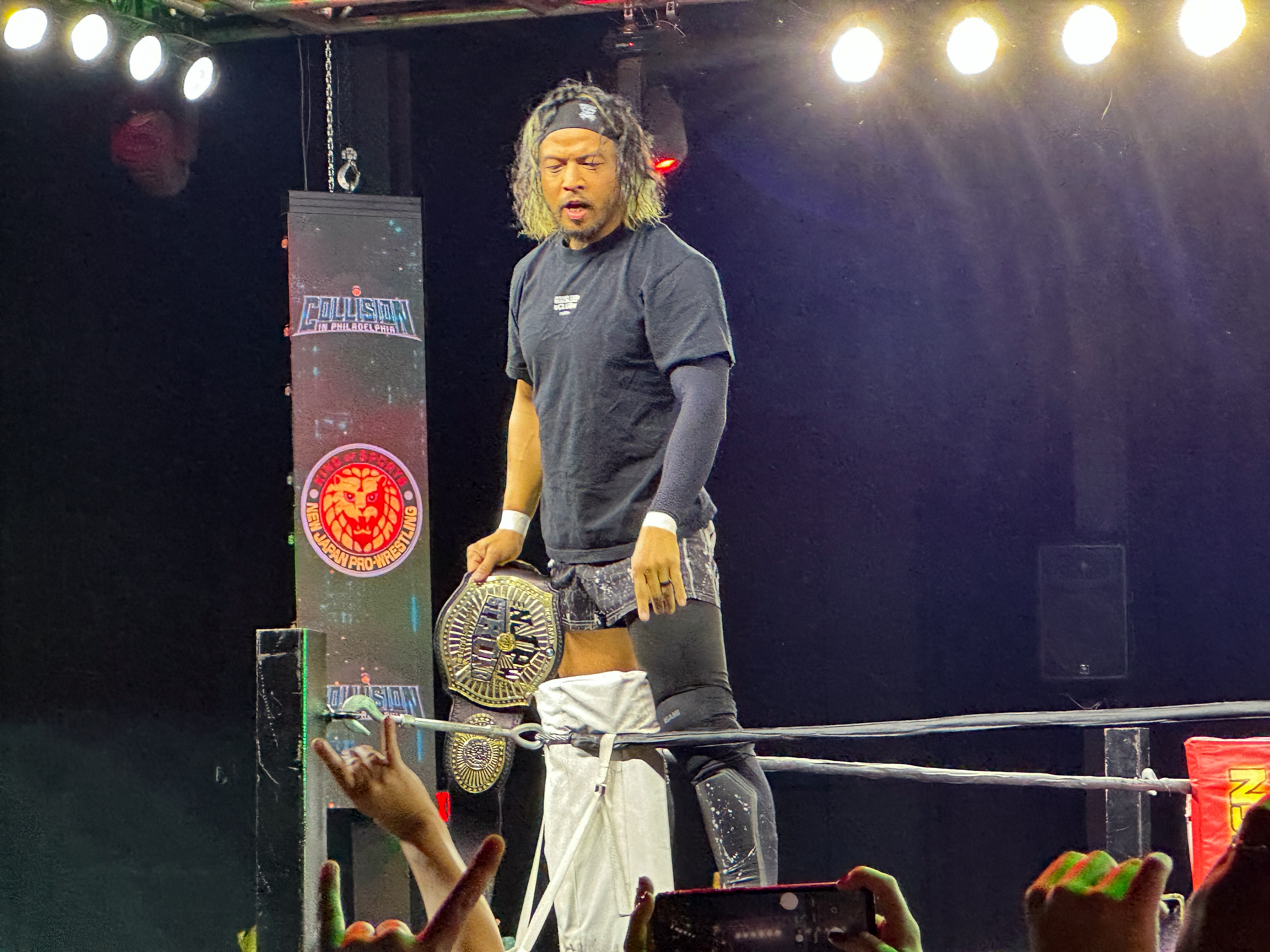
Kenta as the Strong Openweight Champion in April 2023

In November, Kenta returned to Strong, defeating Bad Dude Tito in his return match. The following month, Kenta won a battle royal, to become the number one contender for the Strong Openweight Championship. Kenta returned to Japan at Wrestle Kingdom 17, competing in the New Japan Ranbo, but failed to last till the final 4. Back in the US, Kenta received his championship match for the Strong Openweight Championship at Battle in the Valley, where he defeated Fred Rosser to win the championship.

Kenta returned to Japan to compete in the 2023 New Japan Cup, receiving a bye to the second round, where he was defeated by Sanada. Later that month, Kenta returned to the US to make his first successful Strong Openweight Championship defense at Multiverse United, defeating Minoru Suzuki. The following month, Kenta defended the title against Eddie Edwards at Capital Collision. In May, at Wrestling Dontaku, Kenta lost the Strong Openweight Championship to former Bullet Club stablemate, Hikuleo, ending his reign at 74 days. Despite this, Kenta regained the championship 18 days later, defeating Hikuleo at Resurgence. On July 5's night 2 of Independence Day, Kenta lost the Strong Openweight Championship to Eddie Kingston, ending his reign at 45 days. Later in the month, Kenta entered the 2023 G1 Climax tournament, competing in the B Block. Kenta finished the tournament with 6 points, therefore failing to advance to the quarterfinals.

On January 5, 2024, at New Year Dash!!, Chase Owens came forward to challenge recently crowned IWGP Tag Team Champions and Strong Openweight Tag Team Champions the Guerrillas of Destiny (El Phantasmo and Hikuleo) to a match with his partner being Kenta, which they accepted. After Kenta and Owens unsuccessfully challenged Phantasmo and Hikuleo for the Strong Openweight Tag Team Championship on February 4 at The New Beginning in Nagoya, Guerrillas of Destiny decided to defend the IWGP Tag Team Championship against them at The New Beginning in Osaka. At the event on February 11, Kenta and Owens defeated Guerrillas of Destiny to win the titles, for the first time in Kenta's career. The following month, Kenta entered the New Japan Cup, but was defeated in the first round by Yoshi-Hashi. They lost the titles to Hirooki Goto and Yoshi-Hashi on April 6 at Sakura Genesis, before regaining them on May 4 at Wrestling Dontaku. Kenta would spend the rest of 2024 teaming with Owens.

On January 6, 2025, at New Year Dash!!, Kenta teamed with Taiji Ishimori in a losing effort to El Desperado and Kushida. This would be Kenta's last appearance in NJPW and as a member of Bullet Club.

=== All Elite Wrestling (2021) ===
Kenta made a surprise appearance for All Elite Wrestling (AEW) at the Beach Break event on February 3, 2021, attacking Jon Moxley. He wrestled his debut match for AEW on the February 10 episode of Dynamite, where he teamed with Kenny Omega to defeat Moxley and Lance Archer in a Falls Count Anywhere tag team match.

=== Impact Wrestling (2023) ===
Kenta would make his Impact debut at No Surrender on February 24, teaming with fellow Bullet Club members Chris Bey and Ace Austin, as they would beat Time Machine (Alex Shelley, Chris Sabin and Kushida) in a six-man tag team match. On the following episode of Impact Wrestling, he would face Josh Alexander for the Impact World Championship, in a losing effort.

=== Return to Pro Wrestling Noah (2025–present) ===
On January 1, 2025 at The New Year, Kenta made his return to Pro Wrestling Noah, after two years, defeating Kenoh. Following the match, Kenoh asked Kenta to return to Noah. The following day at New Year Reboot, Kenta saved Kenoh from a post-match assault from Team 2000X, before announcing that he would accept his request to compete in Noah for a year. On February 11, Kenta and Kenoh defeated Kaito Kiyomiya and Shuhei Taniguchi. The following day, it was announced that Kenta had signed a contract with Pro Wrestling Noah, marking his official return to the promotion after 11 years. Shortly after, he began a short feud with Ulka Sasaki, leading to a match on March 22, which Kenta won. Afterwards, Kenta invited Sasaki to join his alliance with Kenoh. Later that night, Kenta challenged Ozawa to a title match for the GHC Heavyweight Championship, who accepted the match under the condition that Kenta and Kenoh would face him and Tetsuya Endo in a no disqualification match on April 14. On May 3 at Memorial Voyage in Kokugikan, Kenta unsuccessfully challenged Ozawa for the GHC Heavyweight Championship. On July 20 at New Departure 2025: Night 2, Kenta defeated Kenoh to capture his second GHC Heavyweight Championship. On November 8 at Noah Star Navigation 2025, Kenta lost the title to Yoshiki Inamura.

On January 1, 2026 at The New Year, Kenta formed the White Raven Sqwad with Tetsuya Endo, Ulka Sasaki and HAYATA. On April 12, 2026 at Apex Conquest, Shane Haste made his return to Pro Wrestling Noah and joined the White Raven Sqwad.

== Professional wrestling style and persona ==
As a former kickboxer, Kenta incorporates shoot-style kicks and stiff strikes. He is considered the innovator of the Go 2 Sleep, in which he carries his opponent in a fireman's carry before dropping them forward while lifting his left knee onto their face, later popularized by CM Punk. He also uses a backbreaker rack version called Ura Go 2 Sleep. Kenta also used running single high knee dubbed the Busaiku Knee, later popularized by Bryan Danielson.

After his release from WWE in 2019, he joined NJPW five months later. Kenta was labelled as an outsider by many New Japan fans due to his long-time association with Pro Wrestling Noah. He would embrace the hatred, even joining the Bullet Club, and adopted the nickname, "Shijō Saiaku no Rannyū-sha" ("The Worst Intruder Ever")

== Championships and accomplishments ==
- Alianza Latinoamericana de Lucha Libre
  - Torneo Latino Americano de Lucha Libre (2013)
- Combat Zone Wrestling
  - Best of the Best XX (2024)
- DEFY Wrestling
  - DEFY World Championship (1 time)
- New Japan Pro-Wrestling
  - IWGP United States Heavyweight Championship (1 time)
  - IWGP Tag Team Championship (2 times) – with Chase Owens
  - NEVER Openweight Championship (1 time)
  - Strong Openweight Championship (2 times)
  - New Japan Cup USA (2020)
  - STRONG Survivor (2023)
- Nikkan Sports
  - Match of The Year Award (2006) vs. Naomichi Marufuji on October 29
  - Match of The Year Award (2008) vs. Naomichi Marufuji on October 25
  - Technique Award (2006, 2007)
- Pro Wrestling Illustrated
  - Ranked No. 22 of the top 500 singles wrestlers in the PWI 500 in 2013
- Pro Wrestling Noah
  - GHC Heavyweight Championship (2 times)
  - GHC Junior Heavyweight Championship (3 times)
  - GHC Junior Heavyweight Tag Team Championship (3 times, inaugural) – with Naomichi Marufuji (1) Taiji Ishimori (1) and Yoshinobu Kanemaru (1)
  - GHC Tag Team Championship (1 time) – with Maybach Taniguchi
  - Two Days Tag Tournament (2011) – with Yoshihiro Takayama
  - Differ Cup (2005) – with Naomichi Marufuji
  - Global League (2012)
  - Global Tag League (2013) – with Yoshihiro Takayama
  - Matsumoto Day Clinic Cup Contention Heavyweight Battle Royal (2013)
  - One Day Six Man Tag Team Tournament (2002) – with Kenta Kobashi and Kentaro Shiga
  - Nippon TV Cup Junior Heavyweight Tag League (2007, 2008, 2010) – with Taiji Ishimori (2007, 2008) and Atsushi Aoki (2010)
  - Global Tag League Fighting Spirit Award (2014) – with Yoshihiro Takayama
- Texas Wrestling Cartel
  - TWC Tag Team Championship (1 time) – with Chase Owens
- Tokyo Sports
  - Best Tag Team Award (2003) with Naomichi Marufuji
  - Match of the Year Award (2006) vs. Naomichi Marufuji, October 29, 2006
  - Outstanding Performance Award (2013)
  - Technique Award (2011)
- Wrestling Observer Newsletter
  - Best Wrestling Maneuver (2006, 2007) Go 2 Sleep
  - Tag Team of the Year (2003, 2004) with Naomichi Marufuji
- WWE
  - Andre the Giant Memorial Battle Royal Qualifying Tournament (2015)
