= New Japan Cup USA =

- New Japan Cup USA 2020 logo
- Promotions: New Japan Pro-Wrestling
- First event: 2020
- Last event: 2021
- Event gimmick: Single-elimination tournament for a championship match

New Japan Cup USA was an annual professional wrestling tournament produced by New Japan Pro-Wrestling (NJPW). The tournament is a spin-off of NJPW's annual New Japan Cup introduced in 2020. The tournament was promoted under NJPW's North American branch, New Japan Pro-Wrestling of America.

New Japan Cup USA was an eight-man, single-elimination tournament. Matches are contested through NJPW's weekly television show, Strong.

== Tournaments ==
Year	Tournament			Aftermath		
Year	Winner	Times won	Participants	Challenged for	Match	Result
2020	Kenta	1	8	IWGP United States Championship	vs. Jon Moxley on Strong; February 26, 2021	Loss
2021	Tom Lawlor	1	8	Strong Openweight Championship	vs. Brody King on Strong; April 23, 2021	Won

== History ==
The New Japan Cup was first held in April 2005. The event then became an annual tradition for NJPW and was held every year around mid-March to mid-April, with the winner receiving a match for the IWGP Heavyweight Championship. After the 2020 edition of the New Japan Cup was delayed until June due to the COVID-19 pandemic, it was announced during a press conference on July 31 that the New Japan Cup USA would take place from August 7 to August 21 of that year, with the winner receiving a shot at the IWGP United States Heavyweight Championship. It was also reported that the matches would be televised on NJPW's new television show, Strong. The next day, the eight-man bracket was announced.

== Editions ==
=== 2020 ===
New Japan Cup USA 2020
- Promotion: New Japan Pro-Wrestling
- Date: August 7–21, 2020
- City: Port Hueneme, California
- Venue: Oceanview Pavilion
- Attendance: 0 (Note: The event was held behind closed doors due to the COVID-19 pandemic.)

Event chronology
← Previous; Summer Struggle	Next → Summer Struggle in Jingu

New Japan Cup USA chronology
← Previous; First	Next → 2021

It commenced on August 7, 2020 and concluded on August 21, 2020.

Round 1 August 7
Karl Fredericks	9:59
Kenta	Pin
Jeff Cobb	Pin
Tanga Loa	8:45
David Finlay	Pin
Chase Owens	9:46
Brody King	7:14
Tama Tonga	Pin

Semi-finals; August 14
Kenta	Pin
Jeff Cobb	14:38
David Finlay	Pin
Tama Tonga	7:10

Final; August 21
Kenta	Pin
David Finlay	13:35

=== 2021 ===
New Japan Cup USA 2021
- Promotion: New Japan Pro-Wrestling
- Date: April 9–23, 2021
- City: Port Hueneme, California
- Venue: Oceanview Pavilion
- Attendance: 0

Event chronology
← Previous; Sakura Genesis	Next → Road to Wrestling Dontaku

New Japan Cup USA chronology
← Previous; 2020	Next → —

New Japan Cup USA 2021 commenced on April 9 and concluded on April 23. Eight qualifying matches were held from March 5–March 26 to determine the eight participants. The bracket was revealed after the eight participants were determined. Originally, the winner of the tournament would receive an IWGP United States Championship title match, but this was changed when NJPW revealed the Strong Openweight Championship on April 2 and announced that the winner will become its inaugural champion instead.

Qualifying; March 5, 12, 19, 26
Clark Connors	Pin
TJP	9:27
Rocky Romero	13:57
Lio Rush	Pin
Brody King	Pin
Bateman	13:25
Blake Christian	8:53
Chris Dickinson	Pin
Ren Narita	Pin
Misterioso	11:12
The DKC	9:13
Tom Lawlor	Pin
Jordan Clearwater	7:57
Hikuleo	Pin
Fred Rosser	Pin
J. R. Kratos	14:16

Round 1 April 9
Clark Connors	9:57
Lio Rush	Pin
Brody King	Pin
Chris Dickinson	10:42
Ren Narita	13:19
Tom Lawlor	Sub
Hikuleo	Pin
Fred Rosser	6:22

Semi-finals; April 16
Lio Rush	7:38
Brody King	Pin
Tom Lawlor	Pin
Hikuleo	8:58

Final; April 23
Brody King	20:05
Tom Lawlor	Sub

== See also ==
- New Japan Cup
