= Global Tag League =

Professional wrestling tournament

The Global Tag League is a professional wrestling round-robin tag team tournament held by Pro Wrestling Noah. It was created in 2008.

The Global Tag League is held under a points system, with two points for a win, one for a time limit draw and none for any other kind of a draw or a loss. The team finishing atop the points standings are the winners. Matches in the Global Tag League have a 30-minute time limit, which is the same as matches for Noah's GHC Tag Team Championship.

The tournament returned in 2024 after a four year break rebranded as the Victory Challenge Tag League. In 2026, after another year off, it was renamed again to the Neo Global Tag League.

In the results below, (C) signifies the GHC Tag Team Champions at the time of each tournament.

== List of winners ==
Tournament	Year	Winners (total won as an individual)	Total won as a team	Refs.
Global Tag League	2008	Akitoshi Saito and Bison Smith	1	
Global Tag League	2009	Mitsuharu Misawa and Go Shiozaki	1	
Global Tag League	2010	Takuma Sano and Yoshihiro Takayama	1	
Global Tag League	2011	Akitoshi Saito (2) and Jun Akiyama	1	
Global Tag League	2012	Naomichi Marufuji and Muhammad Yone	1	
Global Tag League	2013	Kenta and Yoshihiro Takayama (2)	1	
Global Tag League	2014	Masato Tanaka and Takashi Sugiura	1	
Global Tag League	2015	Masato Tanaka (2) and Takashi Sugiura (2)	2	
Global Tag League	2016	Naomichi Marufuji (2) and Toru Yano	1	
Global Tag League	2017	Maybach Taniguchi and Naomichi Marufuji (3)	1	
Global Tag League	2018	Go Shiozaki (2) and Kaito Kiyomiya	1	
Global Tag League	2019	Kazma Sakamoto and Takashi Sugiura (3)	1	
Global Tag League	2020	El Hijo de Dr. Wagner Jr. and René Duprée	1	
Victory Challenge Tag League	2024	Kaito Kiyomiya (2) and Ryohei Oiwa	1	
Neo Global Tag League	2026	Manabu Soya and Yuki Iino	1	

== 2008 ==
The 2008 Global Tag League featured nine teams, and was held from March 29 to April 27.

Final standings
Wrestlers	Score
Akitoshi Saito & Bison Smith	10
Jun Akiyama & Takeshi Rikio	9
Naomichi Marufuji & Takashi Sugiura (C)	9
Mitsuharu Misawa & Yoshinari Ogawa	9
D'Lo Brown & Buchanan	8
Takeshi Morishima & Muhammad Yone	8
Katsuhiko Nakajima & Kensuke Sasaki	8
Takuma Sano & Yoshihiro Takayama	7
Go Shiozaki & Akira Taue	4

Results	Akiyama Rikio	Brown Buchanan	Marufuji Sugiura	Misawa Ogawa	Morishima Yone	Nakajima Sasaki	Saito Smith	Sano Takayama	Shiozaki Taue
Akiyama Rikio	—N/a	Akiyama; Rikio (20:50)	Akiyama; Rikio (23:06)	Akiyama; Rikio (2:31)	Akiyama; Rikio (19:55)	Nakajima; Sasaki (22:17)	Saito; Smith (23:02)	Sano; Takayama (21:06)	Draw (30:00)
Brown Buchanan	Akiyama; Rikio (20:50)	—N/a	Brown; Buchanan (28:02)	Brown; Buchanan (2:08)	Morishima; Yone (23:26)	Nakajima; Sasaki (22:23)	Brown; Buchanan (23:51)	Brown; Buchanan (10:42)	Shiozaki; Taue (18:05)
Marufuji Sugiura	Akiyama; Rikio (23:06)	Brown; Buchanan (28:02)	—N/a	Draw (30:00)	Marufuji; Sugiura (24:47)	Draw (30:00)	Draw (30:00)	Marufuji; Sugiura (21:40)	Marufuji; Sugiura (19:14)
Misawa Ogawa	Akiyama; Rikio (2:31)	Brown; Buchanan (2:08)	Draw (30:00)	—N/a	Misawa; Ogawa (1:48)	Misawa; Ogawa (18:46)	Saito; Smith (17:16)	Misawa; Ogawa (12:14)	Misawa; Ogawa (18:54)
Morishima Yone	Akiyama; Rikio (19:55)	Morishima; Yone (23:26)	Marufuji; Sugiura (24:47)	Misawa; Ogawa (1:48)	—N/a	Draw (30:00)	Morishima; Yone (26:06)	Draw (30:00)	Morishima; Yone (20:00)
Nakajima Sasaki	Nakajima; Sasaki (22:17)	Nakajima; Sasaki (22:23)	Draw (30:00)	Misawa; Ogawa (18:46)	Draw (30:00)	—N/a	Saito; Smith (22:14)	Sano; Takayama (23:49)	Nakajima; Sasaki (23:42)
Saito Smith	Saito; Smith (23:02)	Brown; Buchanan (23:51)	Draw (30:00)	Saito; Smith (17:16)	Morishima; Yone (26:06)	Saito; Smith (22:14)	—N/a	Saito; Smith (20:07)	Draw (30:00)
Sano Takayama	Sano; Takayama (21:06)	Brown; Buchanan (10:42)	Marufuji; Sugiura (21:40)	Misawa; Ogawa (12:14)	Draw (30:00)	Sano; Takayama (23:49)	Saito; Smith (20:07)	—N/a	Sano; Takayama (21:43)
Shiozaki Taue	Draw (30:00)	Shiozaki; Taue (18:05)	Marufuji; Sugiura (19:14)	Misawa; Ogawa (18:54)	Morishima; Yone (20:00)	Nakajima; Sasaki (23:42)	Draw (30:00)	Sano; Takayama (21:43)	—N/a

== 2009 ==
The 2009 Global Tag League featured eight teams, and was held from April 11 to May 6.

Final standings
Wrestlers	Score
Mitsuharu Misawa & Go Shiozaki	9
Takeshi Morishima & Kensuke Sasaki	8
Takeshi Rikio & Muhammad Yone	8
Akitoshi Saito & Bison Smith (C)	8
Takashi Sugiura & Yoshihiro Takayama	8
D'Lo Brown & Buchanan	7
Jun Akiyama & Shuhei Taniguchi	6
Masao Inoue & Akira Taue	2

Results	Akiyama Taniguchi	Brown Buchanan	Inoue Taue	Misawa Shiozaki	Morishima Sasaki	Rikio Yone	Saito Smith	Sugiura Takayama
Akiyama Taniguchi	—N/a	Akiyama; Taniguchi (18:24)	Akiyama; Taniguchi (19:34)	Misawa; Shiozaki (24:23)	Morishima; Sasaki (3:39)	Akiyama; Taniguchi (5:00)	Saito; Smith (19:26)	Sugiura; Takayama (16:12)
Brown Buchanan	Akiyama; Taniguchi (18:24)	—N/a	Brown; Buchanan (10:56)	Misawa; Shiozaki (22:02)	Brown; Buchanan (18:08)	Rikio; Yone (19:43)	Brown; Buchanan (19:28)	Draw (30:00)
Inoue Taue	Akiyama; Taniguchi (19:34)	Brown; Buchanan (10:56)	—N/a	Misawa; Shiozaki (20:57)	Morishima; Sasaki (13:35)	Rikio; Yone (14:20)	Saito; Smith (14:53)	Inoue; Taue (16:27)
Misawa Shiozaki	Misawa; Shiozaki (24:23)	Misawa; Shiozaki (22:02)	Misawa; Shiozaki (20:57)	—N/a	Misawa; Shiozaki (22:53)	Draw (30:00)	Saito; Smith (19:43)	Sugiura; Takayama (21:51)
Morishima Sasaki	Morishima; Sasaki (3:39)	Brown; Buchanan (18:08)	Morishima; Sasaki (13:35)	Misawa; Shiozaki (22:53)	—N/a	Draw (30:00)	Morishima; Sasaki (21:47)	Draw (30:00)
Rikio Yone	Akiyama; Taniguchi (5:00)	Rikio; Yone (19:43)	Rikio; Yone (14:20)	Draw (30:00)	Draw (30:00)	—N/a	Saito; Smith (5:54)	Rikio; Yone (20:51)
Saito Smith	Saito; Smith (19:26)	Brown; Buchanan (19:28)	Saito; Smith (14:53)	Saito; Smith (19:43)	Morishima; Sasaki (21:47)	Saito; Smith (5:54)	—N/a	Sugiura; Takayama (18:47)
Sugiura Takayama	Sugiura; Takayama (16:12)	Draw (30:00)	Inoue; Taue (16:27)	Sugiura; Takayama (21:51)	Draw (30:00)	Rikio; Yone (20:51)	Sugiura; Takayama (18:47)	—N/a

== 2010 ==
The 2010 Global Tag League ran from January 9 through January 24. It was the first edition of the Global Tag League featuring a block system, with eight teams in two blocks of four. The top finishing teams from each block met in the final.

Final standings
Block A		Block B	
Takuma Sano & Yoshihiro Takayama	6	Takashi Sugiura & Shuhei Taniguchi	5
Takeshi Morishima & Kensuke Sasaki	4	Takeshi Rikio & Muhammad Yone (C)	3
Akitoshi Saito & Go Shiozaki	2	Tomoaki Honma & Togi Makabe	2
Claudio Castagnoli & Chris Hero	0	Bison Smith & Keith Walker	2

Block A	Castagnoli Hero	Morishima Sasaki	Saito Shiozaki	Sano Takayama
Castagnoli Hero	—N/a	Morishima; Sasaki (17:00)	Saito; Shiozaki (22:45)	Sano; Takayama (12:40)
Morishima Sasaki	Morishima; Sasaki (17:00)	—N/a	Morishima; Sasaki (17:17)	Sano; Takayama (15:58)
Saito Shiozaki	Saito; Shiozaki (22:45)	Morishima; Sasaki (17:17)	—N/a	Sano; Takayama (18:42)
Sano Takayama	Sano; Takayama (12:40)	Sano; Takayama (15:58)	Sano; Takayama (18:42)	—N/a
Block B	Honma Makabe	Rikio Yone	Smith Walker	Sugiura Taniguchi
Honma Makabe	—N/a	Rikio; Yone (17:11)	Honma; Makabe (15:10)	Sugiura; Taniguchi (11:29)
Rikio Yone	Rikio; Yone (17:11)	—N/a	Smith; Walker (17:21)	Draw (30:00)
Smith Walker	Honma; Makabe (15:10)	Smith; Walker (17:21)	—N/a	Sugiura; Taniguchi (21:00)
Sugiura Taniguchi	Sugiura; Taniguchi (11:29)	Draw (30:00)	Sugiura; Taniguchi (21:00)	—N/a

Final
A1	Takuma Sano & Yoshihiro Takayama	Pin
B1	Takashi Sugiura & Shuhei Taniguchi	24:05

== 2011 ==
The 2011 Global Tag League ran from April 16 to April 29 in the tournament's original round-robin format.

Final standings
Wrestlers	Score
Akitoshi Saito & Jun Akiyama	10
Takuma Sano & Yoshihiro Takayama (C)	9
Go Shiozaki & Shuhei Taniguchi	8
Muhammad Yone & Takashi Sugiura	8
Takeshi Morishima & Yutaka Yoshie	8
Bison Smith & Masao Inoue	5
Chris Hero & Claudio Castagnoli	4
Kensuke Sasaki & Kento Miyahara	4

Results	Saito Akiyama	Smith Inoue	Hero Castagnoli	Shiozaki Taniguchi	Yone Sugiura	Sasaki Miyahara	Morishima Yoshie	Sano Takayama
Saito Akiyama	—N/a	Saito; Akiyama (17:34)	Saito; Akiyama (16:13)	Saito; Akiyama (16:46)	Saito; Akiyama (20:45)	Sasaki; Miyahara (3:08)	Morishima; Yoshie (16:27)	Saito; Akiyama (13:53)
Smith Inoue	Saito; Akiyama (17:34)	—N/a	Smith; Inoue (14:19)	Shiozaki; Taniguchi (21:43)	Draw (30:00)	Sasaki; Miyahara (18:45)	Smith; Inoue (17:20)	Sano; Takayama (17:13)
Hero Castagnoli	Saito; Akiyama (16:13)	Smith; Inoue (14:19)	—N/a	Shiozaki; Taniguchi (18:45)	Yone; Sugiura (24:30)	Hero; Castagnoli (17:48)	Morishima; Yoshie (23:21)	Hero; Castagnoli (14:15)
Shiozaki Taniguchi	Saito; Akiyama (16:46)	Shiozaki; Taniguchi (21:43)	Shiozaki; Taniguchi (18:45)	—N/a	Draw (30:00)	Shiozaki; Taniguchi (20:21)	Morishima; Yoshie (19:03)	Draw (30:00)
Yone Sugiura	Saito; Akiyama (20:45)	Draw (30:00)	Yone; Sugiura (24:30)	Draw (30:00)	—N/a	Yone; Sugiura (14:05)	Yone; Sugiura (15:46)	Sano; Takayama (25:56)
Sasaki Miyahara	Sasaki; Miyahara (3:08)	Sasaki; Miyahara (18:45)	Hero; Castagnoli (17:48)	Shiozaki; Taniguchi (20:21)	Yone; Sugiura (14:05)	—N/a	Morishima; Yoshie (15:13)	Sano; Takayama (13:24)
Morishima Yoshie	Morishima; Yoshie (16:27)	Smith; Inoue (17:20)	Morishima; Yoshie (23:21)	Morishima; Yoshie (19:03)	Yone; Sugiura (15:46)	Morishima; Yoshie (15:13)	—N/a	Sano; Takayama (14:37)
Sano Takayama	Saito; Akiyama (13:53)	Sano; Takayama (17:13)	Hero; Castagnoli (14:15)	Draw (30:00)	Sano; Takayama (25:56)	Sano; Takayama (13:24)	Sano; Takayama (14:37)	—N/a

== 2012 ==
The 2012 Global Tag League ran from April 11 to April 29 in the tournament's original round-robin format.

Final standings
Wrestlers	Score
Naomichi Marufuji & Muhammad Yone	11
Takeshi Morishima & Katsuhiko Nakajima	11
Jun Akiyama & Akitoshi Saito (C)	10
Kento Miyahara & Kensuke Sasaki	7
Daichi Hashimoto & Shinjiro Otani	6
Tamon Honda & Go Shiozaki	6
Colt Cabana & Eddie Edwards	5
Yoshihiro Takayama & Maybach Taniguchi	0

Results	Akiyama Saito	Cabana Edwards	Hashimoto Otani	Honda Shiozaki	Marufuji Yone	Miyahara Sasaki	Morishima Nakajima	Takayama Taniguchi
Akiyama Saito	—N/a	Cabana; Edwards (16:10)	Akiyama; Saito (20:23)	Akiyama; Saito (18:59)	Marufuji; Yone (18:58)	Akiyama; Saito (16:47)	Akiyama; Saito (24:48)	Akiyama; Saito (11:34)
Cabana Edwards	Cabana; Edwards (16:10)	—N/a	Hashimoto; Otani (13:25)	Honda; Shiozaki (18:38)	Draw (30:00)	Miyahara; Sasaki (16:46)	Morishima; Nakajima (17:33)	Cabana; Edwards (6:07)
Hashimoto Otani	Akiyama; Saito (20:23)	Hashimoto; Otani (13:25)	—N/a	Hashimoto; Otani (22:27)	Marufuji; Yone (20:04)	Miyahara; Sasaki (18:01)	Morishima; Nakajima (20:34)	Hashimoto; Otani (13:01)
Honda Shiozaki	Akiyama; Saito (18:59)	Honda; Shiozaki (18:38)	Hashimoto; Otani (22:27)	—N/a	Marufuji; Yone (24:04)	Honda; Shiozaki (14:38)	Morishima; Nakajima (17:45)	Honda; Shiozaki (11:48)
Marufuji Yone	Marufuji; Yone (18:58)	Draw (30:00)	Marufuji; Yone (20:04)	Marufuji; Yone (24:04)	—N/a	Marufuji; Yone (18:58)	Morishima; Nakajima (16:25)	Marufuji; Yone (11:18)
Miyahara Sasaki	Akiyama; Saito (16:47)	Miyahara; Sasaki (16:46)	Miyahara; Sasaki (18:01)	Honda; Shiozaki (14:38)	Morishima; Nakajima (18:58)	—N/a	Draw (30:00)	Takayama; Tanaguchi (5:52)
Morishima Nakajima	Akiyama; Saito (24:48)	Morishima; Nakajima (17:33)	Morishima; Nakajima (20:34)	Morishima; Nakajima (17:45)	Morishima; Nakajima (16:25)	Draw (30:00)	—N/a	Morishima; Nakajima (8:34)
Takayama Taniguchi	Akiyama; Saito (11:34)	Cabana; Edwards (6:07)	Hashimoto; Otani (13:01)	Honda; Shiozaki (11:48)	Marufuji; Yone (11:18)	Takayama; Tanaguchi (5:52)	Morishima; Nakajima (8:34)	—N/a

Tiebreaker Final
Takeshi Morishima & Katsuhiko Nakajima	Pin
Naomichi Marufuji & Muhammad Yone	14:11

== 2013 ==
The 2013 Global Tag League ran from April 13 through April 28. The 2013 edition was only the second to feature two blocks of teams; each consisting of five, with the top teams from each block meeting in the final. Naomichi Marufuji was sidelined with a knee injury on April 14 after his and Takashi Sugiura's first match, a win over Shinya Ishikawa and Yoshihito Sasaki, had already taken place. On April 17, Noah announced that Atsushi Kotoge would replace Marufuji in the tournament, but instead of inheriting Marufuji's and Sugiura's points, they would start at zero points and face Ishikawa and Sasaki in a new match.

Final standings
Block A		Block B	
Kenta & Yoshihiro Takayama	6	Katsuhiko Nakajima & Kensuke Sasaki	6
Muhammad Yone & Takeshi Morishima	6	Mikey Nicholls & Shane Haste	4
Maybach Taniguchi & Yujiro Takahashi	4	Takashi Iizuka & Toru Yano (C)	4
Bobby Fish & Eddie Edwards	2	Atsushi Kotoge & Takashi Sugiura	4
Akitoshi Saito & Tomoaki Honma	2	Shinya Ishikawa & Yoshihito Sasaki	2

Block A	Saito Honma	Fish Edwards	Kenta Takayama	Taniguchi Takahashi	Yone Morishima
Saito Honma	—N/a	Fish; Edwards (13:38)	Kenta; Takayama (20:37)	Saito; Honma (10:32)	Yone; Morishima (14:54)
Fish Edwards	Fish; Edwards (13:38)	—N/a	Kenta; Takayama (18:58)	Taniguchi; Takahashi (16:03)	Yone; Morishima (18:26)
Kenta Takayama	Kenta; Takayama (20:37)	Kenta; Takayama (18:58)	—N/a	Taniguchi; Takahashi (15:31)	Kenta; Takayama (14:50)
Taniguchi Takahashi	Saito; Honma (10:32)	Taniguchi; Takahashi (16:03)	Taniguchi; Takahashi (15:31)	—N/a	Yone; Morishima (14:46)
Yone Morishima	Yone; Morishima (14:54)	Yone; Morishima (18:26)	Kenta; Takayama (14:50)	Yone; Morishima (14:46)	—N/a
Block B	Kotoge Sugiura	Nakajima K. Sasaki	Nicholls Haste	Ishikawa Y. Sasaki	Iizuka Yano
Kotoge Sugiura	—N/a	Nakajima; K. Sasaki (14:59)	Kotoge; Sugiura (19:01)	Kotoge; Sugiura (8:48)	Iizuka; Yano (15:34)
Nakajima K. Sasaki	Nakajima; K. Sasaki (14:59)	—N/a	Nicholls; Haste (13:53)	Nakajima; K. Sasaki (15:06)	Nakajima; K. Sasaki (12:16)
Nicholls Haste	Kotoge; Sugiura (19:01)	Nicholls; Haste (13:53)	—N/a	Ishikawa; Y. Sasaki (14:32)	Nicholls; Haste (8:55)
Ishikawa Y. Sasaki	Kotoge; Sugiura (8:48)	Nakajima; K. Sasaki (15:06)	Ishikawa; Y. Sasaki (14:32)	—N/a	Iizuka; Yano (11:36)
Iizuka Yano	Iizuka; Yano (15:34)	Nakajima; K. Sasaki (12:16)	Nicholls; Haste (8:55)	Iizuka; Yano (11:36)	—N/a

Final
A1	Kenta & Yoshihiro Takayama	Pin
B1	Katsuhiko Nakajima & Kensuke Sasaki	19:39

== 2014 ==
The 2014 Global Tag League ran from April 12 through April 27.

Final standings
Wrestlers	Score
Masato Tanaka & Takashi Sugiura	8
Katsuhiko Nakajima & Naomichi Marufuji	8
Mikey Nicholls & Shane Haste	6
Kenta & Yoshihiro Takayama	6
Daisuke Ikeda & Muhammad Yone	6
Maybach Taniguchi & Takeshi Morishima (C)	4
Chris Hero & Colt Cabana	4

Results	Ikeda Yone	Hero Cabana	Nakajima Marufuji	Kenta Takayama	Tanaka Sugiura	Taniguchi Morishima	Nicholls Haste
Ikeda Yone	—N/a	Ikeda; Yone (14:49)	Nakajima; Marufuji (16:48)	Kenta; Takayama (6:35)	Ikeda; Yone (13:30)	Ikeda; Yone (14:47)	Nicholls; Haste (11:23)
Hero Cabana	Ikeda; Yone (14:49)	—N/a	Hero; Cabana (14:47)	Hero; Cabana (14:39)	Tanaka; Sugiura (14:52)	Taniguchi; Morishima (13:03)	Nicholls; Haste (14:20)
Nakajima Marufuji	Nakajima; Marufuji (16:48)	Hero; Cabana (14:47)	—N/a	Kenta; Takayama (18:04)	Nakajima; Marufuji (19:05)	Nakajima; Marufuji (16:47)	Nakajima; Marufuji (14:39)
Kenta Takayama	Kenta; Takayama (6:35)	Hero; Cabana (14:39)	Kenta; Takayama (18:04)	—N/a	Tanaka; Sugiura (21:05)	Kenta; Takayama (16:43)	Nicholls; Haste (14:26)
Tanaka Sugiura	Ikeda; Yone (13:30)	Tanaka; Sugiura (14:52)	Nakajima; Marufuji (19:05)	Tanaka; Sugiura (21:05)	—N/a	Tanaka; Sugiura (12:44)	Tanaka; Sugiura (18:33)
Taniguchi Morishima	Ikeda; Yone (14:47)	Taniguchi; Morishima (13:03)	Nakajima; Marufuji (16:47)	Kenta; Takayama (16:43)	Tanaka; Sugiura (12:44)	—N/a	Taniguchi; Morishima (14:15)
Nicholls Haste	Nicholls; Haste (11:23)	Nicholls; Haste (14:20)	Nakajima; Marufuji (14:39)	Nicholls; Haste (14:26)	Tanaka; Sugiura (18:33)	Taniguchi; Morishima (14:15)	—N/a

Playoff
1	Katsuhiko Nakajima & Naomichi Marufuji	Pin
2	Masato Tanaka & Takashi Sugiura	18:01

== 2015 ==
The 2015 Global Tag League ran from April 19 through May 4. Takeshi Morishima was scheduled to enter the tournament, but was forced to pull out due to injury and was replaced by Super Crazy.

Final standings
Block A		Block B	
Masato Tanaka & Takashi Sugiura	8	Davey Boy Smith Jr. & Lance Archer (C)	8
Mikey Nicholls & Shane Haste	6	Brian Breaker & Shelton X Benjamin	6
Minoru Suzuki & Takashi Iizuka	6	Chris Hero & Colt Cabana	6
Katsuhiko Nakajima & Naomichi Marufuji	6	Daisuke Ikeda & Muhammad Yone	6
Daisuke Sekimoto & Kazuki Hashimoto	2	Akitoshi Saito & Quiet Storm	4
Maybach Taniguchi & Maybach #2	2	Mitsuhiro Kitamiya & Super Crazy	0

Block A	Sekimoto Hashimoto	Nakajima Marufuji	Tanaka Sugiura	Taniguchi Maybach #2	Nicholls Haste	Suzuki Iizuka
Sekimoto Hashimoto	—N/a	Nakajima; Marufuji (16:16)	Tanaka; Sugiura (11:30)	Sekimoto; Hashimoto (10:32)	Nicholls; Haste (12:08)	Suzuki; Iizuka (12:02)
Nakajima Marufuji	Nakajima; Marufuji (16:16)	—N/a	Nakajima; Marufuji (15:03)	Nakajima; Marufuji (16:37)	Nicholls; Haste (19:19)	Suzuki; Iizuka (12:17)
Tanaka Sugiura	Tanaka; Sugiura (11:30)	Nakajima; Marufuji (15:03)	—N/a	Tanaka; Sugiura (13:03)	Tanaka; Sugiura (21:50)	Tanaka; Sugiura (19:41)
Taniguchi Maybach #2	Sekimoto; Hashimoto (10:32)	Nakajima; Marufuji (16:37)	Tanaka; Sugiura (13:03)	—N/a	Taniguchi; Maybach #2 (7:18)	Suzuki; Iizuka (11:39)
Nicholls Haste	Nicholls; Haste (12:08)	Nicholls; Haste (19:19)	Tanaka; Sugiura (21:50)	Taniguchi; Maybach #2 (7:18)	—N/a	Nicholls; Haste (14:09)
Suzuki Iizuka	Suzuki; Iizuka (12:02)	Suzuki; Iizuka (12:17)	Tanaka; Sugiura (19:41)	Suzuki; Iizuka (11:39)	Nicholls; Haste (14:09)	—N/a
Block B	Saito Storm	Breaker Benjamin	Hero Cabana	Ikeda Yone	Smith Archer	Kitamiya Crazy
Saito Storm	—N/a	Breaker; Benjamin (7:37)	Saito; Storm (9:33)	Ikeda; Yone (13:17)	Smith; Archer (10:11)	Saito; Storm (11:53)
Breaker Benjamin	Breaker; Benjamin (7:37)	—N/a	Hero; Cabana (11:28)	Breaker; Benjamin (5:35)	Smith; Archer (12:10)	Breaker; Benjamin (7:44)
Hero Cabana	Saito; Storm (9:33)	Hero; Cabana (11:28)	—N/a	Ikeda; Yone (11:45)	Hero; Cabana (12:41)	Hero; Cabana (10:45)
Ikeda Yone	Ikeda; Yone (13:17)	Breaker; Benjamin (5:35)	Ikeda; Yone (11:45)	—N/a	Smith; Archer (1:42)	Ikeda; Yone (10:56)
Smith Archer	Smith; Archer (10:11)	Smith; Archer (12:10)	Hero; Cabana (12:41)	Smith; Archer (1:42)	—N/a	Smith; Archer (12:01)
Kitamiya Crazy	Saito; Storm (11:53)	Breaker; Benjamin (7:44)	Hero; Cabana (10:45)	Ikeda; Yone (10:56)	Smith; Archer (12:01)	—N/a

Final
A1	Masato Tanaka and Takashi Sugiura	Pin
B1	Davey Boy Smith Jr. and Lance Archer	19:55

== 2016 ==
The 2016 Global Tag League took place between April 21 and May 4.

Final standings
Wrestlers	Score
Davey Boy Smith Jr. and Lance Archer (C)	10
Naomichi Marufuji and Toru Yano	8
Go Shiozaki and Maybach Taniguchi	8
Shelton X Benjamin and Takashi Sugiura	8
Katsuhiko Nakajima and Masa Kitamiya	6
Minoru Suzuki and Takashi Iizuka	6
Hiroyoshi Tenzan and Satoshi Kojima	6
Muhammad Yone and Quiet Storm	4

Results	Smith Archer	Shiozaki Taniguchi	Tenzan Kojima	Nakajima Kitamiya	Suzuki Iizuka	Yone Storm	Marufuji Yano	Benjamin Sugiura
Smith Archer	—N/a	Smith; Archer (14:10)	Smith; Archer (12:17)	Smith; Archer (10:21)	Suzuki; Iizuka (10:23)	Smith; Archer (9:32)	Smith; Archer (12:34)	Benjamin; Sugiura (12:26)
Shiozaki Taniguchi	Smith; Archer (14:10)	—N/a	Shiozaki; Taniguchi (14:10)	Shiozaki; Taniguchi (18:30)	Suzuki; Iizuka (18:09)	Shiozaki; Taniguchi (11:18)	Marufuji; Yano (14:33)	Shiozaki; Taniguchi (20:51)
Tenzan Kojima	Smith; Archer (12:17)	Shiozaki; Taniguchi (14:10)	—N/a	Nakajima; Kitamiya (14:22)	Suzuki; Iizuka (15:15)	Tenzan; Kojima (10:41)	Tenzan; Kojima (14:12)	Tenzan; Kojima (13:31)
Nakajima Kitamiya	Smith; Archer (10:21)	Shiozaki; Taniguchi (18:30)	Nakajima; Kitamiya (14:22)	—N/a	Nakajima; Kitamiya (13:55)	Yone; Storm (10:42)	Nakajima; Kitamiya (17:19)	Sugiura; Benjamin (15:44)
Suzuki Iizuka	Suzuki; Iizuka (10:23)	Suzuki; Iizuka (18:09)	Suzuki; Iizuka (15:15)	Nakajima; Kitamiya (13:55)	—N/a	Yone; Storm (14:08)	Marufuji; Yano (19:10)	Benjamin; Sugiura (6:55)
Yone Storm	Smith; Archer (9:32)	Shiozaki; Taniguchi (11:18)	Tenzan; Kojima (10:41)	Yone; Storm (10:42)	Yone; Storm (14:08)	—N/a	Marufuji; Yano (12:20)	Benjamin; Sugiura (12:36)
Marufuji Yano	Smith; Archer (12:34)	Marufuji; Yano (14:33)	Tenzan; Kojima (14:12)	Nakajima; Kitamiya (17:19)	Marufuji; Yano (19:10)	Marufuji; Yano (12:20)	—N/a	Marufuji; Yano (13:10)
Benjamin Sugiura	Benjamin; Sugiura (12:26)	Shiozaki; Taniguchi (20:51)	Tenzan; Kojima (13:31)	Sugiura; Benjamin (15:44)	Benjamin; Sugiura (6:55)	Benjamin; Sugiura (12:36)	Marufuji; Yano (13:10)	—N/a

Final
1	Davey Boy Smith Jr. and Lance Archer	Pin
2	Naomichi Marufuji and Toru Yano	20:25

== 2017 ==
The 2017 Global Tag League took place from April 22 to May 4. On April 26, the team of Bram and Robbie E was removed from the league with the two forfeiting the rest of their matches, due to controversial Instagram posts made by Bram.

Final standings
Wrestlers	Score
Maybach Taniguchi and Naomichi Marufuji (C)	10
Atsushi Kotoge and Go Shiozaki	10
Kenoh and Takashi Sugiura	8
Katsuhiko Nakajima and Masa Kitamiya	8
Cody Hall and Randy Reign	8
Akitoshi Saito and Muhammad Yone	6
Kaito Kiyomiya and Takuya Nomura	4
Bram and Robbie E	2

Results	Saito Yone	Kotoge Shiozaki	Bram Robbie E	Hall Reign	Kiyomiya Nomura	Nakajima Kitamiya	Kenoh Sugiura	Taniguchi Marufuji
Saito Yone	—N/a	Kotoge; Shiozaki (16:00)	Saito; Yone (forfeit)	Hall; Reign (12:53)	Saito; Yone (15:55)	Saito; Yone (15:11)	Kenoh; Sugiura (13:42)	Taniguchi; Marufuji (15:13)
Kotoge Shiozaki	Kotoge; Shiozaki (16:00)	—N/a	Bram; Robbie E (17:48)	Kotoge; Shiozaki (12:08)	Kotoge; Shiozaki (14:50)	Kotoge; Shiozaki (19:46)	Kotoge; Shiozaki (22:18)	Taniguchi; Marufuji (20:50)
Robbie E Bram	Saito; Yone (forfeit)	Bram; Robbie E (17:48)	—N/a	Hall; Reign (10:03)	Kiyomiya; Nomura (forfeit)	Nakajima; Kitamiya (12:54)	Kenoh; Sugiura (forfeit)	Taniguchi; Marufuji (forfeit)
Hall Reign	Hall; Reign (12:53)	Kotoge; Shiozaki (12:08)	Hall; Reign (10:03)	—N/a	Kiyomiya; Nomura (12:21)	Hall; Reign (11:34)	Nakajima; Kitamiya (12:13)	Hall; Reign (8:40)
Kiyomiya Nomura	Saito; Yone (15:55)	Kotoge; Shiozaki (14:50)	Kiyomiya; Nomura (forfeit)	Kiyomiya; Nomura (12:21)	—N/a	Nakajima; Kitamiya (14:29)	Kenoh; Sugiura (15:01)	Taniguchi; Marufuji (13:06)
Nakajima Kitamiya	Saito; Yone (15:11)	Kotoge; Shiozaki (19:46)	Nakajima; Kitamiya (12:54)	Nakajima; Kitamiya (12:13)	Nakajima; Kitamiya (14:29)	—N/a	Kenoh; Sugiura (17:52)	Nakajima; Kitamiya (18:16)
Kenoh Sugiura	Kenoh; Sugiura (13:42)	Kotoge; Shiozaki (22:18)	Kenoh; Sugiura (forfeit)	Hall; Reign (11:34)	Kenoh; Sugiura (15:01)	Kenoh; Sugiura (17:52)	—N/a	Taniguchi; Marufuji (17:51)
Taniguchi Marufuji	Taniguchi; Marufuji (15:13)	Taniguchi; Marufuji (20:50)	Taniguchi; Marufuji (forfeit)	Hall; Reign (8:40)	Taniguchi; Marufuji (13:06)	Nakajima; Kitamiya (18:16)	Taniguchi; Marufuji (17:51)	—N/a

Final
1	Maybach Taniguchi and Naomichi Marufuji	Pin
2	Atsushi Kotoge and Go Shiozaki	28:57

== 2018 ==
The 2018 Global Tag League took place from March 18 to April 11.

Final standings
Wrestlers	Score
Kenoh and Takashi Sugiura	9
Go Shiozaki and Kaito Kiyomiya	8
Atsushi Kotoge and Naomichi Marufuji	7
Katsuhiko Nakajima and Masa Kitamiya (C)	7
Muhammad Yone and Quiet Storm	7
Maybach Taniguchi and Mitsuya Nagai	6
Cody Hall and Kazma Sakamoto	6
Akitoshi Saito and Masao Inoue	2

Results	Saito Inoue	Kotoge Marufuji	Hall Sakamoto	Shiozaki Kiyomiya	Nakajima Kitamiya	Kenoh Sugiura	Taniguchi Nagai	Yone Storm
Saito Inoue	—N/a	Kotoge; Marufuji (15:28)	Saito; Inoue (8:35)	Shiozaki; Kiyomiya (13:54)	Nakajima; Kitamiya (10:17)	Kenoh; Sugiura (12:44)	Taniguchi; Nagai (12:47)	Yone; Storm (11:16)
Kotoge Marufuji	Kotoge; Marufuji (15:28)	—N/a	Hall; Sakamoto (14:37)	Shiozaki; Kiyomiya (18:28)	Draw (30:00)	Kotoge; Marufuji (18:10)	Taniguchi; Nagai (9:49)	Kotoge; Marufuji (17:48)
Hall Sakamoto	Saito; Inoue (8:35)	Hall; Sakamoto (14:37)	—N/a	Draw (16:41)	Nakajima; Kitamiya (10:32)	Kenoh; Sugiura (11:59)	Hall; Sakamoto (12:24)	Hall; Sakamoto (9:13)
Shiozaki Kiyomiya	Shiozaki; Kiyomiya (13:54)	Shiozaki; Kiyomiya (18:28)	Draw (16:41)	—N/a	Shiozaki; Kiyomiya (19:53)	Draw (30:00)	Taniguchi; Nagai (forfeit)	Draw (30:00)
Nakajima Kitamiya	Nakajima; Kitamiya (10:17)	Draw (30:00)	Nakajima; Kitamiya (10:32)	Shiozaki; Kiyomiya (19:53)	—N/a	Kenoh; Sugiura (23:21)	Draw (16:03)	Nakajima; Kitamiya (12:44)
Kenoh Sugiura	Kenoh; Sugiura (12:44)	Kotoge; Marufuji (18:10)	Kenoh; Sugiura (11:59)	Draw (30:00)	Kenoh; Sugiura (23:21)	—N/a	Kenoh; Sugiura (16:49)	Yone; Storm (18:20)
Taniguchi Nagai	Taniguchi; Nagai (12:47)	Taniguchi; Nagai (9:49)	Hall; Sakamoto (12:24)	Taniguchi; Nagai (forfeit)	Draw (16:03)	Kenoh; Sugiura (16:49)	—N/a	Yone; Storm (12:15)
Yone Storm	Yone; Storm (11:16)	Kotoge; Marufuji (17:48)	Hall; Sakamoto (9:13)	Draw (30:00)	Nakajima; Kitamiya (12:44)	Yone; Storm (18:20)	Yone; Storm (12:15)	—N/a

Final
1	Kenoh and Takashi Sugiura	26:00
2	Go Shiozaki and Kaito Kiyomiya	Pin

== 2019 ==
The 2019 Global Tag League took place from April 6 to May 5.

Final standings
Wrestlers	Score
Go Shiozaki and Katsuhiko Nakajima (c)	11
Kazma Sakamoto and Takashi Sugiura	10
Kaito Kiyomiya and Kenoh	9
Maybach Taniguchi and Yuji Hino	8
Akitoshi Saito and Masao Inoue	6
Atsushi Kotoge and Mitsuya Nagai	4
Masa Kitamiya and Yoshiki Inamura	4
Muhammad Yone and Quiet Storm	4

Results	Saito Inoue	Kotoge Nagai	Shiozaki Nakajima	Kiyomiya Kenoh	Sakamoto Sugiura	Kitamiya Inamura	Taniguchi Hino	Yone Storm
Saito Inoue	—N/a	Kotoge; Nagai (13:42)	Saito; Inoue (19:54)	Saito; Inoue (18:48)	Sakamoto; Sugiura (11:28)	Kitamiya; Inamura (14:18)	Saito; Inoue (15:32)	Yone; Storm (13:53)
Kotoge Nagai	Kotoge; Nagai (13:42)	—N/a	Shiozaki; Nakajima (19:17)	Kiyomiya; Kenoh (18:04)	Sakamoto; Sugiura (13:22)	Kotoge; Nagai (11:55)	Taniguchi; Hino (15:01)	Yone; Storm (14:16)
Shiozaki Nakajima	Saito; Inoue (19:54)	Shiozaki; Nakajima (19:17)	—N/a	Draw (30:00)	Shiozaki; Nakajima (24:46)	Shiozaki; Nakajima (22:43)	Shiozaki; Nakajima (20:27)	Shiozaki; Nakajima (Forfeit)
Kiyomiya Kenoh	Saito; Inoue (18:48)	Kiyomiya; Kenoh (18:04)	Draw (30:00)	—N/a	Sakamoto; Sugiura (26:27)	Kiyomiya; Kenoh (20:08)	Kiyomiya; Kenoh (17:35)	Kiyomiya; Kenoh (14:42)
Sakamoto Sugiura	Sakamoto; Sugiura (11:28)	Sakamoto; Sugiura (13:22)	Shiozaki; Nakajima (24:46)	Sakamoto; Sugiura (26:27)	—N/a	Sakamoto; Sugiura (16:30)	Taniguchi; Hino (17:52)	Sakamoto; Sugiura (13:57)
Kitamiya Inamura	Kitamiya; Inamura (14:18)	Kotoge; Nagai (11:55)	Shiozaki; Nakajima (22:43)	Kiyomiya; Kenoh (20:08)	Sakamoto; Sugiura (16:30)	—N/a	Taniguchi; Hino (16:57)	Kitamiya; Inamura (Forfeit)
Taniguchi Hino	Saito; Inoue (15:32)	Taniguchi; Hino (15:01)	Shiozaki; Nakajima (20:27)	Kiyomiya; Kenoh (17:35)	Taniguchi; Hino (17:52)	Taniguchi; Hino (16:57)	—N/a	Taniguchi; Hino (Forfeit)
Yone Storm	Yone; Storm (13:53)	Yone; Storm (14:16)	Shiozaki; Nakajima (Forfeit)	Kiyomiya; Kenoh (14:42)	Sakamoto; Sugiura (13:57)	Kitamiya; Inamura (Forfeit)	Taniguchi; Hino (Forfeit)	—N/a

Final
1	Go Shiozaki and Katsuhiko Nakajima	27:39
2	Kazma Sakamoto and Takashi Sugiura	Sub

== 2020 ==
The 2020 Global Tag League took place from April 4 to April 18.

Final standings
Block A		Block B	
El Hijo de Dr. Wagner Jr. and Rene Dupree	4	Go Shiozaki and Katsuhiko Nakajima	4
Kenoh and Masa Kitamiya	4	Takashi Sugiura and Hideki Sekine	4
Naomichi Marufuji and Masaaki Mochizuki (c)	2	Daisuke Sekimoto and Yoshiki Inamura	2
Kaito Kiyomiya and Shuhei Taniguchi	2	Akitoshi Saito and Masao Inoue	2

Block A	Marufuji Mochizuki	Kiyomiya Taniguchi	Kenoh Kitamiya	Wagner Dupree
Marufuji Mochizuki	—N/a	Marufuji; Mochizuki (16:02)	Kenoh; Kitamiya (18:21)	Wagner; Dupree (17:17)
Kiyomiya Taniguchi	Marufuji; Mochizuki (16:02)	—N/a	Kenoh; Kitamiya (14:58)	Kiyomiya; Taniguchi (12:01)
Kenoh Kitamiya	Kenoh; Kitamiya (18:21)	Kenoh; Kitamiya (14:58)	—N/a	Wagner; Dupree (14:55)
Wagner Dupree	Wagner; Dupree (17:17)	Kiyomiya; Taniguchi (12:01)	Wagner; Dupree (14:55)	—N/a
Block B	Shiozaki Nakajima	Sugiura Sekine	Saito Inoue	Sekimoto Inamura
Shiozaki Nakajima	—N/a	Shiozaki; Nakajima (20:56)	Saito; Inoue (17:20)	Shiozaki; Nakajima (24:00)
Sugiura Sekine	Shiozaki; Nakajima (20:56)	—N/a	Sugiura; Sekine (9:27)	Sugiura; Sekine (19:59)
Saito Inoue	Saito; Inoue (17:20)	Sugiura; Sekine (9:27)	—N/a	Sekimoto; Inamura (3:19)
Sekimoto Inamura	Shiozaki; Nakajima (24:00)	Sugiura; Sekine (19:59)	Sekimoto; Inamura (3:19)	—N/a

Final
A1	El Hijo de Dr. Wagner Jr. and Rene Dupree	Pin
B1	Katsuhiko Nakajima and Go Shiozaki	27:00

== 2024 ==
The Global Tag League returned after a four-year hiatus, now rebranded as the Victory Challenge Tag League, and took place from February 24 to March 10, 2024.

Final standings
Wrestlers	Score
Saxon Huxley and Timothy Thatcher	10
Kaito Kiyomiya and Ryohei Oiwa	9
Dragón Bane and Alpha Wolf	9
Go Shiozaki and Atsushi Kotoge	7
Takashi Sugiura and Ulka Sasaki	6
Manabu Soya and Shuji Kondo	5
Masa Kitamiya and Daiki Inaba	5
Kenoh and Yu Owada	5

Results	Kitamiya Inaba	Kiyomiya Oiwa	Shiozaki Kotoge	Sugiura Sasaki	Soya Kondo	Huxley Thatcher	Bane Wolf	Kenoh Owada
Kitamiya Inaba	—N/a	Kiyomiya; Oiwa (18:14)	Shiozaki; Kotoge (16:36)	Sugiura; Sasaki (1:19)	Draw (20:00)	Kitamiya; Inaba (14:00)	Bane; Wolf (10:33)	Kitamiya; Inaba (11:20)
Kiyomiya Oiwa	Kiyomiya; Oiwa (18:14)	—N/a	Kiyomiya; Oiwa (16:52)	Kiyomiya; Oiwa (17:15)	Soya; Kondo (12:58)	Huxley; Thatcher (12:54)	Kiyomiya; Oiwa (16:09)	Draw (20:00)
Shiozaki Kotoge	Shiozaki; Kotoge (16:36)	Kiyomiya; Oiwa (16:52)	—N/a	Sugiura; Sasaki (15:44)	Shiozaki; Kotoge (16:38)	Shiozaki; Kotoge (13:28)	Draw (20:00)	Kenoh; Owada (10:13)
Sugiura Sasaki	Sugiura; Sasaki (11:19)	Kiyomiya; Oiwa (17:15)	Sugiura; Sasaki (15:44)	—N/a	Sugiura; Sasaki (12:42)	Huxley; Thatcher (11:28)	Bane; Wolf (9:21)	Kenoh; Owada (10:40)
Soya Kondo	Draw (20:00)	Soya; Kondo (12:58)	Shiozaki; Kotoge (16:38)	Sugiura; Sasaki (12:42)	—N/a	Huxley; Thatcher (13:19)	Bane; Wolf (12:25)	Soya; Kondo (13:06)
Huxley Thatcher	Kitamiya; Inaba (14:00)	Huxley; Thatcher (12:54)	Shiozaki; Kotoge (13:28)	Huxley; Thatcher (11:28)	Huxley; Thatcher (13:19)	—N/a	Huxley; Thatcher (14:09)	Huxley; Thatcher (3:28)
Bane Wolf	Bane; Wolf (10:33)	Kiyomiya; Oiwa (16:09)	Draw (20:00)	Bane; Wolf (9:21)	Bane; Wolf (12:25)	Huxley; Thatcher (14:09)	—N/a	Bane; Wolf (12:37)
Kenoh Owada	Kitamiya; Inaba (11:20)	Draw (20:00)	Kenoh; Owada (10:13)	Kenoh; Owada (10:40)	Soya; Kondo (13:06)	Huxley; Thatcher (3:28)	Bane; Wolf (12:37)	—N/a

Final
Saxon Huxley and Timothy Thatcher	22:24
Kaito Kiyomiya and Ryohei Oiwa	Pin

== 2026 ==
The Global Tag League returned after a year-long hiatus, rebranded as the Neo Global Tag League. It ran from May 23 to June 16, featuring twelve teams divided into two blocks. Mercari was the presenting sponsor for the tournament. On June 5, Noah announced that Harutoki would miss the remainder of the tournament due to a spinal cord injury without radiographic abnormality. Alejandro would replace him as Kaito Kiyomiya's tag team partner.

Final standings
Block A		Block B	
Doc Gallows and Karl Anderson	8	Manabu Soya and Yuki Iino	8
Tetsuya Naito and Bushi	6	Naomichi Marufuji and Kenoh	8
Tetsuya Endo and Hayata	6	Yoshiki Inamura and Stallion Rogers	6
Masa Kitamiya and Takashi Sugiura	6	Ozawa and Tadasuke	4
Kid Lykos and Kid Lykos II	2	Kazuyuki Fujita and Mohammed Yone	4
Kaito Kiyomiya and Alejandro	2	Kenta and Katsumi Inahata	0

Block A	Naito Bushi	Kiyomiya Alejandro	Endo Hayata	Gallows Anderson	Lykos Lykos II	Kitamiya Sugiura
Naito Bushi	—N/a	Kiyomiya; Harutoki (15:24)	Naito; Bushi (12:47)	Gallows; Anderson (15:58)	Naito; Bushi (12:01)	Naito; Bushi (13:28)
Kiyomiya Alejandro	Kiyomiya; Harutoki (15:24)	—N/a	Endo (Hayata (11:42)	Gallows; Anderson (11:45)	Lykos; Lykos II (15:59)	Kitamiya; Sugiura (3:46)
Endo Hayata	Naito; Bushi (12:47)	Endo (Hayata (11:42)	—N/a	Gallows; Anderson (14:55)	Endo; Hayata (11:26)	Endo; Hayata (12:38)
Gallows Anderson	Gallows; Anderson (15:58)	Gallows; Anderson (11:45)	Gallows; Anderson (14:55)	—N/a	Gallows; Anderson (10:16)	Kitamiya; Sugiura (10:22)
Lykos Lykos II	Naito; Bushi (12:01)	Lykos; Lykos II (15:59)	Endo; Hayata (11:26)	Gallows; Anderson (10:16)	—N/a	Kitamiya; Sugiura (13:31)
Kitamiya Sugiura	Naito; Bushi (13:28)	Kitamiya; Sugiura (3:46)	Endo; Hayata (12:38)	Kitamiya; Sugiura (10:22)	Kitamiya; Sugiura (13:31)	—N/a
Block B	Marufuji Kenoh	Inamura Rogers	Fujita Yone	Kenta Inahata	Soya Iino	Ozawa Tadasuke
Marufuji Kenoh	—N/a	Marufuji; Kenoh (15:03)	Marufuji; Kenoh (12:12)	Marufuji; Kenoh (11:25)	Soya; Iino (20:28)	Marufuji; Kenoh (14:06)
Inamura Rogers	Marufuji; Kenoh (15:03)	—N/a	Fujita; Yone (14:34)	Inamura; Rogers (10:55)	Inamura; Rogers (9:00)	Inamura; Rogers (11:32)
Fujita Yone	Marufuji; Kenoh (12:12)	Fujita; Yone (14:34)	—N/a	Fujita; Yone (11:29)	Soya; Iino (11:50)	Ozawa; Tadasuke (14:59)
Kenta Inahata	Marufuji; Kenoh (11:25)	Inamura; Rogers (10:55)	Fujita; Yone (11:29)	—N/a	Soya; Iino (14:03)	Ozawa; Tadasuke (14:49)
Soya Iino	Soya; Iino (20:28)	Inamura; Rogers (9:00)	Soya; Iino (11:50)	Soya; Iino (14:03)	—N/a	Soya; Iino (11:25)
Ozawa Tadasuke	Marufuji; Kenoh (14:06)	Inamura; Rogers (11:32)	Ozawa; Tadasuke (14:59)	Ozawa; Tadasuke (14:49)	Soya; Iino (11:25)	—N/a

Final
A1	Doc Gallows and Karl Anderson	25:55
B1	Manabu Soya and Yuki Iino	Pin

== See also ==
- World Tag League
- World's Strongest Tag Determination League
- Ultimate Tag League
- Furinkazan
- Saikyo Tag League
