= Jun Izumida =

Japanese professional wrestler and rikishi (1965 – 2017)

Personal information
- Born: October 28, 1965 Kurihara, Miyagi, Japan
- Died: January 25, 2017 (aged 51) Kanagawa, Japan

Professional wrestling career
- Ring name(s): Junji Izumida; Jun Izumida; IZU; Ryūkaku Izumida; Ryuma Izumida
- Billed height: 1.85 m (6 ft 1 in)
- Billed weight: 130 kg (290 lb)
- Debut: May 25, 1992
- Retired: March 18, 2012 (last match)

Jun Izumida (泉田 純, Izumida Jun; October 28, 1965 – January 25, 2017) was a Japanese professional wrestler who worked for All Japan Pro Wrestling and Pro Wrestling Noah.

== Sumo career ==
Musashiumi
Personal information
- Native name: 武蔵海
- Born: Jun Izumida; October 28, 1965 Kurihara, Miyagi, Japan
- Died: January 25, 2017 (aged 51) Kanagawa, Japan
- Height: 182.7 cm (71.9 in)
- Weight: 129 kg (284 lb)

Sport
- Sport: Sumo
- Retired: September, 1991
- Heya: Azumazeki
- Record: 121-103-7
- Debut: March, 1986
- Highest rank: Makushita 37 (May, 1991)
- Updated on May 2025

Before being a professional wrestler, Izumida was a sumo wrestler, making his debut in March 1986. He reached a highest rank of makushita 37. He trained at Azumazeki stable and was known under three different ring names (shikona): Takamishō (高見将), Seiunryū (青雲龍), and finally Musashiumi (武蔵海). He retired from sumo in September 1991.

== Professional wrestling career ==
Izumida debuted for All Japan Pro Wrestling at the age of twenty-six after being scouted by the company. On May 25, 1992, he wrestled his first match with Giant Baba and Rusher Kimura against Masanobu Fuchi, Haruka Eigen, and Motoshi Okuma. He then formed a team with Tamon Honda, and the two enjoyed a reign as All Asia Tag Team Champions.

When Mitsuharu Misawa left AJPW in mid-2000 and formed Pro Wrestling Noah, Izumida followed. In Noah, Izumida formed the Violence Bulldogs faction with his close friend, Akira Taue. A hilarious comedy match on June 10, 2005, saw him team with fellow sumo Takeshi Rikio to defeat Jun Akiyama and (at the time) rookie Go Shiozaki in a tag team match, with the stipulation that Izumida would propose to female wrestler Mima Shimoda if he won. Shimoda proceeded to reject a kiss attempt from him.

Beginning in early-2010, Izumida declared free agency to wrestle in other promotions. He made a return to All Japan on June 24, 2010, teaming with Yoshinobu Kanemaru to beat Hiroshi Yamato and Yasufumi Nakanoue in a tag team match. In his last match, on March 18, 2012, he teamed with Takao Omori and Manabu Soya to defeat Dark Cuervo, Dark Ozz, and RONIN.

== Death ==
Izumida was found dead on January 31, 2017, in his home in Kanagawa. It was determined he had died on January 25 of a heart attack.

== Championships and accomplishments ==
- All Japan Pro Wrestling
  - All Asia Tag Team Championship (1 time) – with Tamon Honda
  - January 2 Korakuen Hall Heavyweight Battle Royal Winner (1998)
- International Wrestling Association of Japan
  - IWA Tag Team Championship (1 time) – with Shoichi Ichimiya
  - IWA Tag Team Title Tournament (2002) – with Shoichi Ichimiya

== Sumo career record ==
Musashiumi
Year	January Hatsu basho, Tokyo	March Haru basho, Osaka	May Natsu basho, Tokyo	July Nagoya basho, Nagoya	September Aki basho, Tokyo	November Kyūshū basho, Fukuoka
1986	x	(Maezumō)	East Jonokuchi #12; 5–2	West Jonidan #110; 5–2	East Jonidan #66; 2–5	East Jonidan #87; 4–3
1987	West Jonidan #60; 4–3	East Jonidan #30; 3–4	West Jonidan #46; 3–4	East Jonidan #60; 4–3	West Jonidan #38; 4–3	East Jonidan #13; 4–3
1988	East Sandanme #97; 2–5	West Jonidan #22; 3–4	East Jonidan #37; 5–2	West Jonidan #2; 5–2	East Sandanme #66; 6–1	East Sandanme #17; 2–5
1989	West Sandanme #45; 3–4	West Sandanme #58; 4–3	West Sandanme #41; 3–4	East Sandanme #55; 4–3	East Sandanme #36; 6–1	East Makushita #56; 4–3
1990	East Makushita #47; 3–4	West Sandanme #3; 3–4	East Sandanme #21; 5–2	West Makushita #58; 3–4	West Sandanme #12; 3–4	East Sandanme #24; 4–3
1991	West Sandanme #7; 4–3	East Makushita #55; 5–2	West Makushita #37; 3–4	East Makushita #49; 3–4	East Makushita #60; Retired; 0–0–7	x
Record given as wins–losses–absences Top division champion Top division runner-up Retired Non-participation Jūryō Lower divisions Sanshō key: F=Fighting spirit; O=Outstanding performance; T=Technique Also shown: ★=Kinboshi; P=Playoff(s); Divisions: Makuuchi — Jūryō — Makushita — Sandanme — Jonidan — Jonokuchi Makuuchi ranks: Yokozuna — Ōzeki — Sekiwake — Komusubi — Maegashira
