= Muhammad Yone =

Japanese professional wrestler

Personal information
- Born: Satoshi Yoneyama; February 23, 1976 (age 50) Nagoya, Aichi, Japan

Professional wrestling career
- Ring name(s): Bichon Frise; Captain Noah; Muhammad Yone; Satoshi Yoneyama
- Billed height: 1.85 m (6 ft 1 in)
- Billed weight: 110 kg (243 lb)
- Trained by: Yoshiaki Fujiwara; Yuki Ishikawa
- Debut: August 18, 1995

Satoshi Yoneyama (米山 聡, Yoneyama Satoshi; born February 23, 1976), better known by his ring name Muhammad Yone (モハメド・ヨネ, Mohamedo Yone), is a Japanese professional wrestler, currently working for Pro Wrestling Noah, where he is a multi-time GHC Tag Team Champion, a one time GHC Openweight Hardcore Champion and winner of the Global Tag League in 2012 with Naomichi Marufuji. He is known for his trademark afro hairstyle, which earned him the nickname "Mr. Afro".

== Professional wrestling career ==
Yoneyama made his professional wrestling debut on August 18, 1995, wrestling under his real name Satoshi Yoneyama. Early in his career he would work for Japanese promotions such as Big Japan Pro Wrestling, Battlarts, Michinoku Pro, WAR and Frontier Martial-Arts Wrestling. In 1999, he changed his ring name to Muhammad Yone (spelled "Mohammad Yone" in some sources). In 2000, Yone joined All Japan Pro Wrestling (AJPW) working low card matches.

=== Pro Wrestling Noah (2001–present) ===
In 2001, top AJPW wrestler Mitsuharu Misawa and a number of other AJPW wrestlers, including Yone, left the promotion to start their own wrestling promotion called Pro Wrestling Noah. On March 5, 2005, Yone defeated Naomichi Marufuji to win the GHC Openweight Hardcore Championship, a championship he would hold for 231 days until Scorpio won it on October 22, 2005. During that time Yone began teaming regularly with Takeshi Morishima in the tag team division. On October 28, 2005 the duo defeated Marufuji and Minoru Suzuki to win the GHC Tag Team Championship. They later lost the championship to Tamon Honda and Kenta Kobashi. In 2006, Yone and Morishima won the vacant tag team championship once more and held it until April 1, 2007, when they lost to Jun Akiyama and Takeshi Rikio. In 2009, Yone helped create a group known as "Disobey" that included himself, Kenta, Yoshinobu Kanemaru, Genba Hirayanagi, Takeshi Rikio and Kotaro Suzuki. Yone and Rikio defeated Morishima and Kensuke Sasaki to with the GHC Tag Team Championship on December 6, 2009, as part of the 2009 "Winter Navigation Tour". Their reign lasted until April 14, 2010, when they lost to Bison Smith and Keith Walker. In 2012, Yone became part of a stable known as "Brave" that also included Naomichi Marufuji, Katsuhiko Nakajima, Taiji Ishimori, Atsushi Kotoge, Takeshi Morishima, Takashi Sugiura and Ricky Marvin. Marufuji and Yone went on to win the 2012 version of the Global Tag League, defeating Morishima and Katsuhiko Nakajima in the finals. Yone unsuccessfully challenged Katsuhiko Nakajima for the GHC title in Korakuen Hall on June 4, 2017.

== Championships and accomplishments ==
- All Japan Pro Wrestling
  - January 3 Korakuen Hall Junior Heavyweight Battle Royal (2001)
- Battlarts
  - Battlarts Tag Battle (1998) - with Alexander Otsuka
- Nikkan Sports
  - Best Tag Team Award (2006) with Takeshi Morishima
- Pro Wrestling Illustrated
  - PWI ranked him #89 of the top 500 singles wrestlers in the PWI 500 in 2010
- Pro Wrestling Noah
  - GHC Openweight Hardcore Championship (1 time)
  - GHC Tag Team Championship (5 times) – with Takeshi Morishima (2), Takeshi Rikio (1), and Quiet Storm (2)
  - Global Tag League (2012) – with Naomichi Marufuji
  - One Day Six Man Heavyweight Tag Team Tournament (2008) - with Mitsuharu Misawa and Takeshi Morishima
