= Samson Kutsuwada =

Japanese professional wrestler (1947 – 2004)

Personal information
- Born: Tomotsugu Kutsuwada; May 1, 1947 Ebetsu, Hokkaido, Japan
- Died: October 12, 2004 (aged 57)

Professional wrestling career
- Ring name(s): Great Kutsuwada; The Great Tojo; Hiro Tojo; Samson Kutsuwada; Tiger Mask; Tomotsugu Kutsuwada; Ultra Tiger Mask
- Billed height: 6 ft 3 in (191 cm)
- Billed weight: 266 lb (121 kg)
- Trained by: Karl Gotch
- Debut: August 1967
- Retired: 1977

Tomotsugu Kutsuwada (轡田 友継, Kutsuwada Tomotsugu; May 1, 1947 – October 12, 2004) was a Japanese professional wrestler, better known by the ring name Samson Kutsuwada (サムソン・クツワダ, Samuson Kutsuwada).

== Professional wrestling career ==
Kutsuwada trained under Karl Gotch and joined Japan Pro Wrestling Alliance (JPWA) in August 1967.

In 1972, Kutsuwada left the JPWA to join the newly-formed All Japan Pro Wrestling promotion. He won the All Asia Tag Team Championship with Akihisa Mera in October 1976.

From 1973 to 1974, Kutsuwada wrestled for World Championship Wrestling in Australia.

From 1974 to 1977, Kutsuwada also wrestled for International Wrestling Enterprise.

Kutsuwada retired in 1977. All Japan Pro Wrestling held a ceremony in his honor during an event on 16 October 2004 in Iida, Nagano.

== Championships and accomplishments ==
- All Japan Pro Wrestling
  - All Asia Tag Team Championship (1 time) – with Akihisa Mera
- World Championship Wrestling
  - NWA Austra-Asian Tag Team Championship (3 times) – with Hito Tojo (1), Waldo Von Erich (1), Les Roberts (1)
