= Masao Inoue (wrestler) =

Japanese professional wrestler (born 1970)

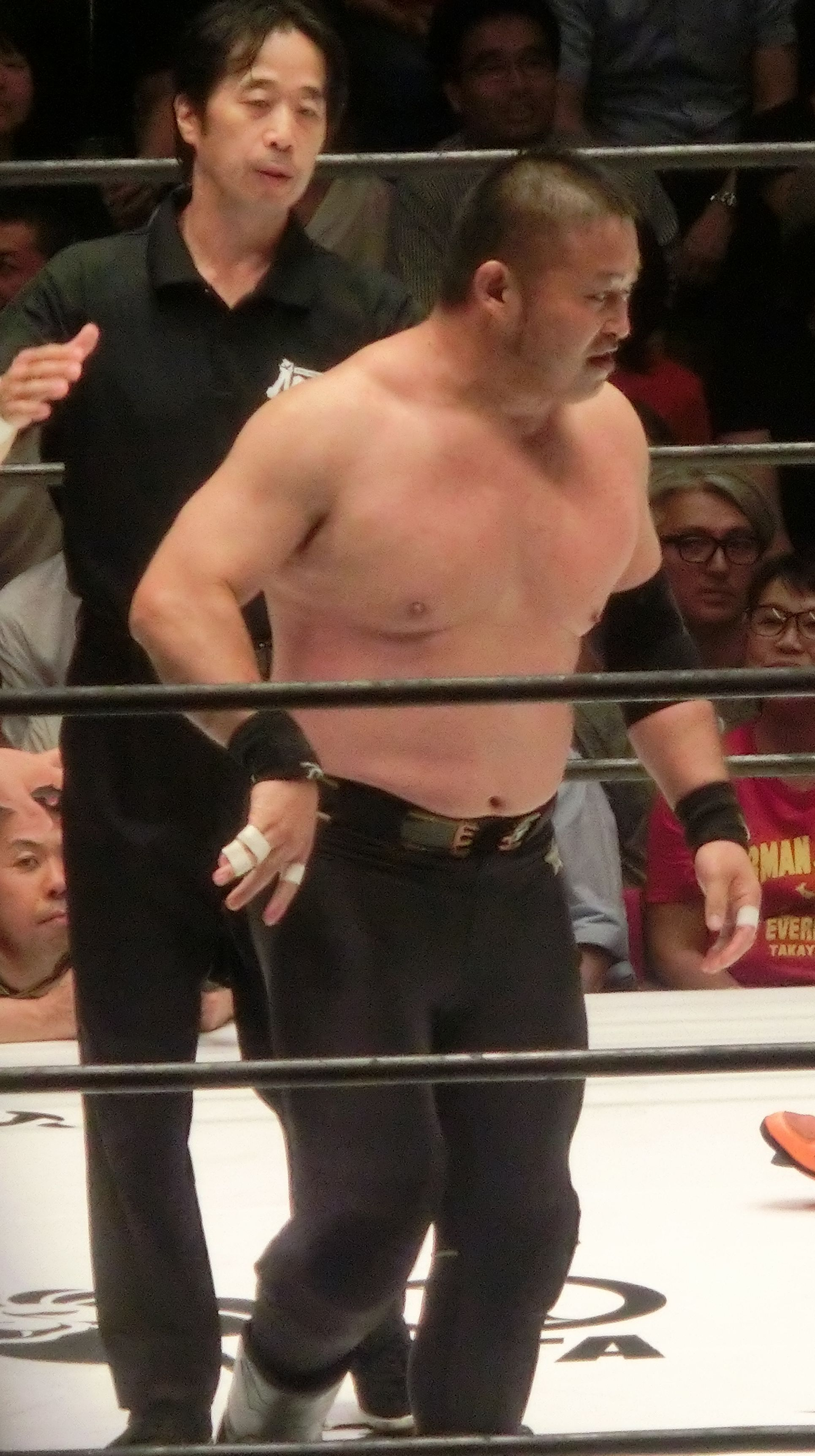

Personal information
- Born: March 6, 1970 (age 56) Chūō, Yamanashi, Japan

Professional wrestling career
- Ring name(s): Chunen Mogura Otoko; Masao Inoue; Mogura; Naomichi Marufuji?
- Billed height: 1.80 m (5 ft 11 in)
- Billed weight: 106 kg (234 lb)
- Trained by: AJPW Dojo
- Debut: April 4, 1991

Masao Inoue (井上雅央, Inoue Masao; born March 6, 1970 in Chūō, Yamanashi Prefecture, Japan) is a Japanese professional wrestler who currently works for Pro Wrestling Noah as a freelancer. He started his career in All Japan Pro Wrestling in 1991, before jumping to Pro Wrestling Noah during a mass exodus in 2000. Inoue spent the next 12 years with Noah before returning to AJPW in 2012. Since then, he has competed regularly for both promotions as a freelancer.

== Professional wrestling career ==
=== All Japan Pro Wrestling (1991–2000) ===
Masao Inoue debuted in All Japan Pro Wrestling in 1991. He served as an underling for Toshiaki Kawada and Akira Taue. He found little success until he started a regular tag team with Tamon Honda near the end of his All Japan stay. The tandem won the All Asia Tag Team Championship in 1999.

=== Pro Wrestling Noah (2000–present) ===
In mid-2000 Masao Inoue left All Japan Pro Wrestling along with all but two All Japan native workers to join Mitsuharu Misawa's newly formed Pro Wrestling Noah. Inoue and Honda were still the All Asia Tag Team champions and as a result, the titles were vacated when they left.

Inoue was a founding member of the Dark Agents stable along with Akitoshi Saito and Takashi Sugiura. He would be second-in-command to Saito. Inoue generally spent his time near the bottom card, not receiving very many high-profile matches. After several years of struggling to make it up the card, Inoue and seven other NOAH wrestlers were given a huge opportunity in late March and early April 2006 to main event a Tokyo Nippon Budokan event. GHC Heavyweight Champion Jun Akiyama proposed a tournament to determine his next challenger. Inoue shocked many wrestling fans by beating rookie Shuhei Taniguchi, Takuma Sano, and finally stablemate Akitoshi Saito to win the tournament. Inoue faced Akiyama in an emotional match and lasted over 23 minutes before falling to the wrist-clutch exploder. Through this tournament win and his subsequent hard-fought match against Akiyama, Inoue greatly improved his stock in the company.

Inoue took part in another number one contender tournament through August and early September 2007, however, Inoue did not make it out of his five-person block winning only one match via forfeit against Takeshi Rikio. While Inoue throughout the majority of 2007 and 2008 was featured only in multi-man tag team matches, on December 23 and 24 he took part in another tournament, this simply titled 'The Tournament' which consisted of matches contested to a ten-minute time limit where, if the time limit was met, the matches would be decided by a five-person judge panel. Inoue defeated Kentaro Shiga, Yoshinobu Kanemaru, Yoshihiro Takayama, and Takuma Sano, all matches that went the time limit and were decided in Inoue's favor by the judges, before facing off with stable mate Saito in a rematch of the 2006 title tournament. In this tournament, Saito came out on top defeating Inoue in a 5-0 judges' clean sweep.

Inoue took part in the 2009 Global Tag League alongside Akira Taue. The duo proved fairly unsuccessful as they won only one match finishing last out of the eight teams with two points. Inoue won a Noah 'Royal Rumble', wrestling under the ring name "Naomichi Marufuji" on July 5. In his final match of the year, Inoue lost a match to Kenta Kobashi for the GHC Openweight Hardcore Championship. In April 2011, Inoue took part in the Global Tag League for the second time in his career, this time with Bison Smith. Inoue fared better this time, finishing in sixth place out of eight teams with five points.

Following 2011, Inoue began to make only sporadic appearances in Pro Wrestling Noah as he spent the better part of his time in All Japan. Inoue's appearances in Noah steadily dropped off to the point where Inoue made no appearances in 2016 and only six in 2015 and seven in 2014. Inoue made his return to Noah on June 16, 2017, following nearly two full years away from the company where, teaming with Cody Hall, they defeated the team known as the Back Breakers, Hajime Ohara and Hitoshi Kumano.

=== All Japan Pro Wrestling (2012–present) ===
Following over a decade away from All Japan, Inoue made his return on March 4, 2012, where he teamed with Masanobu Fuchi in a losing effort to Akebono and Ryota Hama. Inoue received his first title match since his return on August 8 where he faced Akebono and Hama with KENSO as his partner, however, the pair fell short in their bid for the All Asia Tag Team Championships.

Inoue's first attempt at winning an All Japan singles championship since his return came on September 25, 2016, where he came up short against Yohei Nakajima in a match for the Gaora TV Championship. Inoue on January 2, 2017, received, along with partner Jun Akiyama, a match for the All Asia Tag Team Championships in a Street Bunkhouse Death Match against the champions Atsushi Onita and Masanobu Fuchi. The tandem ultimately came up short in their bid to dethrone the champions.

== Championships and accomplishments ==
- All Japan Pro Wrestling
  - All Asia Tag Team Championship (2 times) - with Tamon Honda (1) and Takao Omori (1)
  - All Asia Tag Team League (1999) - with Tamon Honda
- Dramatic Dream Team

- Ironman Heavymetalweight Championship (2 times)

- Frontier Martial-Arts Wrestling
  - WEW Tag Team Championship (1 time) - with Yoshinobu Kanemaru
- Pro Wrestling Illustrated
  - PWI ranked him #241 of the 500 best singles wrestlers of the PWI 500 in 2006
- Pro Wrestling NOAH
  - GHC Title Shot Tournament (2006)
  - Global Tag League Technique Prize (2011)- with Bison Smith
  - Joikaru Cup Scramble Battle Royal (2013)
  - NACK5 Cup 10 Man Scramble Battle Royal (2013)
- Other Titles
  - Destroyer Cup (2019)
