= All Asia Tag Team Championship =

Professional wrestling tag team championship

- Original design of the belts

Details
- Promotion: Japan Wrestling Association (1955–1973); All Japan Pro Wrestling (1976–present); DDT Pro-Wrestling (2023–2024)
- Date established: November 16, 1955
- Current champions: Musashi and Seiki Yoshioka
- Date won: October 11, 2026

Other name
- AJPW All Asia Tag Team Championship
Statistics
- First champions: King Kong Czaya and Tiger Joginder Singh
- Most reigns: As individual: Michiaki Yoshimura (10); As team: Dan Kroffat and Doug Furnas (5)
- Longest reign: Jun Akiyama and Takao Omori (1,076 days)
- Shortest reign: Mitsuharu Misawa and Yoshinari Ogawa (<1 day)
- Oldest champion: Atsushi Onita (66 years, 81 days)

The (All) Asia Tag Team Championship ((オール・)アジア・タッグ王座, (ōru) ajia taggu ōza) is a professional wrestling tag team title in Japanese promotion All Japan Pro Wrestling (AJPW). Originally, it was the top tag team title in the JWA, but its status became secondary once the NWA International Tag Team Championship was brought from the United States. It is currently one of two tag team titles in AJPW, along with the World Tag Team Championship. It is also the current oldest active title in Japan.

The current champions are Musashi and Seiki Yoshioka, who are in their third reign as a team.

== History ==
The title was created on November 16, 1955, in the Japan Wrestling Association (JWA) when King Kong Czaya and Tiger Joginder Singh defeated JWA founder Rikidōzan and Harold Sakata in a tournament final. It was abandoned in 1973 when the JWA closed, but was later revived in 1976 by AJPW in response to New Japan Pro-Wrestling (NJPW) announcing the creation of its own version of the title.

== Reigns ==
There have been a total of 132 official reigns and 34 vacancies, with the first 27 reigns from the JWA also being recognized by AJPW. There have been a total of 98 teams consisting of 118 distinctive champions who have won the championship. The current champions are Atsuki Aoyagi and Rising Hayato who are in their first reign as a team.

Key
No.	Overall reign number
Reign	Reign number for the specific team—reign numbers for the individuals are in parentheses, if different
Days	Number of days held
Defenses	Number of successful defenses
<1	Reign lasted less than a day
+	Current reign is changing daily

No.	Champion	Championship change			Reign statistics			Notes	Ref.
No.	Champion	Date	Event	Location	Reign	Days	Defenses	Notes	Ref.
Japan Wrestling Association (JPW)
1	King Kong Czaya and Tiger Joginder Singh	November 16, 1955	Live event	Tokyo, Japan	1	1,660	N/A	Defeated Rikidōzan and Harold Sakata in a two out of three falls tournament final.	
—	Vacated	June 2, 1960	JWA International Competitors of the Spring - Night 10	Osaka, Japan	—	—	—	Vacated due to Czaya and Jokinder splitting up.	
2	Dan Miller and Frank Valois	June 2, 1960	JWA International Competitors of the Spring - Night 10	Osaka, Japan	1	5	0	Defeated Rikidōzan and Michiaki Yoshimura in a two out of three falls tournament final.	
3	Rikidōzan and Toyonobori	June 7, 1960	JWA International Competitors Of The Spring - Night 13	Nagoya, Japan	1	606	0	This was a Two out of three falls match.	
4	Luther Lindsay and Ricky Waldo	February 3, 1962	Live event	Tokyo, Japan	1	12	0		
5	Rikidōzan and Toyonobori	February 15, 1962	Live event	Tokyo, Japan	2	109	0		
6	Buddy Austin and Mike Sharpe	June 4, 1962	Live event	Osaka, Japan	1	27	0	This was a Two out of three falls match.	
7	Rikidōzan and Toyonobori	July 1, 1962	Live event	Toyonaka, Japan	3	(Note: The date the championship was either won or lost is uncertain, which means that the reign lasted between 184 and 214 days.)	0		
—	Vacated	January 1963	—	—	—	—	—	Vacated due to Toyonobori getting injured.	
8	Rikidōzan and Toyonobori	May 6, 1963	JWA The 5th Annual World Big League	Sapporo, Japan	4	223	0	Defeated Fred Atkins and Killer Kowalski.	
—	Vacated	December 15, 1963	—	—	—	—	—	Vacated due to Rikidōzan dying of stab wounds.	
9	Toyonobori and Michiaki Yoshimura	February 20, 1964	Live event	Nagoya, Japan	1 (5, 1)	84	N/A	Defeated Prince Curtis Iaukea and Don Manoukian.	
10	Calypso Hurricane and Gene Kiniski	May 14, 1964	Live event	Yokohama, Japan	1	15	N/A		
11	Giant Baba and Toyonobori	May 29, 1964	Live event	Sapporo, Japan	1 (1, 6)	370	N/A		
12	The Destroyer and Billy Red Lyons	June 3, 1965	Live event	Sapporo, Japan	1	42	N/A		
13	Giant Baba and Toyonobori	July 15, 1965	Live event	Shizuoka, Japan	2 (2, 7)	174	N/A		
—	Vacated	January 5, 1966	—	—	—	—	—	Vacated due to Toyonobori taking a leave of absence.	
14	Joe Carollo and Killer Karl Kox	May 26, 1966	Live event	Sendai, Japan	1	2	0	Defeated Giant Baba and Michiaki Yoshimura.	
15	Hiro Matsuda and Michiaki Yoshimura	May 28, 1966	Live event	Sapporo, Japan	1 (1, 2)	30	1		
16	Eddie Graham and Killer Karl Kox	June 27, 1966	Live event	Nagoya, Japan	1 (1, 2)	4	N/A		
17	Giant Baba and Michiaki Yoshimura	July 1, 1966	Live event	Hiroshima, Japan	1 (3, 3)	127	N/A		
—	Vacated	November 5, 1966	—	—	—	—	—	Baba and Yoshimura won the NWA International Tag Team Championship.	
18	Kintarō Ōki and Michiaki Yoshimura	December 3, 1966	JWA Winter Series	Tokyo, Japan	1 (1, 4)	N/A	2	Defeated Eddie Morrow and Tarzan Zorro.	
—	Vacated	April 1967	—	—	—	—	—	Ohki was injured in a car accident.	
19	Antonio Inoki and Michiaki Yoshimura	May 26, 1967	JWA Diamond Series	Sapporo, Japan	1 (1, 5)	158	1	Defeated Ike Eakins and Waldo Von Erich.	
—	Vacated	October 31, 1967	—	—	—	—	—	Inoki won the NWA International Tag Team titles.	
20	Kintarō Ōki and Michiaki Yoshimura	January 6, 1968	Live event	Osaka, Japan	2 (2, 6)	184	2	Defeated Bill Miller and Rick Hunter.	
21	Klondike Bill and Skull Murphy	July 8, 1968	Live event	Tokyo, Japan	1	22	0		
22	Kintarō Ōki and Michiaki Yoshimura	July 30, 1968	Live event	Sapporo, Japan	3 (3, 7)	175	2		
—	Vacated	January 21, 1969	—	—	—	—	—	Vacated due to Yoshimura making an excursion to the United States.	
23	Antonio Inoki and Kintarō Ōki	February 3, 1969	Live event	Sapporo, Japan	1 (2, 4)	150	N/A	Defeated Tom Jones and Buster Lloyd.	
—	Vacated	July 3, 1969	—	—	—	—	—	Vacated so Ohki could focus on defending the All Asia Heavyweight Championship.	
24	Antonio Inoki and Michiaki Yoshimura	August 9, 1969	Live event	Nagoya, Japan	2 (3, 8)	62	N/A	Defeated Crusher Lisowski and Art Michalik.	
—	Vacated	October 10, 1969	—	Yamagata, Japan	—	—	—	Held up after a controversial match against Mr. Atomic and Buddy Austin.	
25	Antonio Inoki and Michiaki Yoshimura	October 30, 1969	Live event	Gifu, Japan	3 (4, 9)	(Note: The date the championship was either won or lost is uncertain, which means that the reign lasted between 762 and 792 days.)	3	Defeated Mr. Atomic and Buddy Austin in a rematch.	
—	Vacated	December 1971	—	—	—	—	—	Inoki left the JWA.	
26	Seiji Sakaguchi and Michiaki Yoshimura	December 12, 1971	JWA World Champion Series	Tokyo, Japan	1 (1, 10)	415	1	Defeated Dory Funk, Jr. and Dick Murdoch.	
—	Vacated	January 30, 1973	—	—	—	—	—	Yoshimura retired.	
27	The Great Kojika and Gentetsu Matsuoka	March 3, 1973	Live event	Osaka, Japan	1	48	0	Defeated Killer Karl Krupp and Kurt Von Steiger.	
—	Deactivated	April 20, 1973	—	—	—	—	—	The JWA closed.	
All Japan Pro Wrestling (AJPW)
28	The Great Kojika and Motoshi Okuma	March 26, 1976	Live event	Seoul, South Korea	1 (2, 1)	190	2	Defeated two Korean representatives to revive the titles in AJPW.	
29	The Oates Brothers (Jerry Oates and Ted Oates)	October 2, 1976	Giant Series	Tokyo, Japan	1	19	0		
30	Samson Kutsuwada and Akihisa Takachiho	October 21, 1976	Live event	Fukushima, Japan	1	238	2		
31	The Great Kojika and Motoshi Okuma	June 16, 1977	Live event	Tokyo, Japan	2 (3, 2)	143	2		
32	Animal Hamaguchi and Mighty Inoue	November 6, 1977	Live event	Tokyo, Japan	1	108	4		
33	The Great Kojika and Motoshi Okuma	February 22, 1978	Live event	Gifu, Japan	3 (4, 3)	(Note: The date the championship was either won or lost is uncertain, which means that the reign lasted between 160 and 189 days.)	0		
—	Vacated	August 1978	—	—	—	—	—	Kojika and Okuma did not defend the titles for six months.	
34	The Great Kojika and Motoshi Okuma	May 31, 1979	Live event	Noshiro, Japan	4 (5, 4)	723	5	Defeated Butch Miller and Sweet Williams.	
35	The Von Erichs (David and Kevin Von Erich)	May 23, 1981	Live event	Tokyo, Japan	1	19	0		
36	Takashi Ishikawa and Akio Sato	June 11, 1981	Live event	Tokyo, Japan	1	(Note: The date the championship was either won or lost is uncertain, which means that the reign lasted between 204 and 234 days.)	4		
—	Vacated	January 1983	—	—	—	—	—	Sato was injured.	
37	Ashura Hara and Mighty Inoue	February 23, 1983	Live event	Takaishi, Japan	1 (1, 2)	368	8	Defeated The Great Kojika and Motoshi Okuma.	
—	Vacated	February 26, 1984	—	—	—	—	—	Vacated so Inoue could focus on the NWA International Junior Heavyweight Championship.	
38	Ashura Hara and Takashi Ishikawa	February 16, 1984	Live event	Nagasaki, Japan	1 (2, 2)	249	0	Defeated Thomas Ivey and Jerry Morrow.	
—	Vacated	October 22, 1984	—	—	—	—	—	Vacated for undocumented reasons.	
39	Takashi Ishikawa and Akio Sato	April 15, 1985	Live event	Nagasaki, Japan	2 (3, 2)	94	0	Defeated Animal Hamaguchi and Masanobu Kurisu.	
40	Ishin Gundan (Animal Hamaguchi and Isamu Teranishi)	July 18, 1985	Live event	Tokyo, Japan	1 (2, 1)	(Note: The date the championship was either won or lost is uncertain, which means that the reign lasted between 1 and 13 days.)	1		
41	Norio Honaga and Isamu Teranishi	July 1985	Live event	N/A	1 (1, 2)	(Note: The date the championship was either won or lost is uncertain, which means that the reign lasted between 92 and 104 days.)	1		
42	Mighty Inoue and Takashi Ishikawa	October 31, 1985	Live event	Tsuruoka, Japan	1 (3, 4)	364	1		
43	Ashura Hara and Super Strong Machine	October 30, 1986	Live event	Aomori, Japan	1 (3, 1)	(Note: The date the championship was either won or lost is uncertain, which means that the reign lasted between 122 and 152 days.)	0		
—	Vacated	March 1987	—	—	—	—	—	Super Strong Machine left AJPW.	
44	Mighty Inoue and Takashi Ishikawa	July 30, 1987	Live event	Tokyo, Japan	2 (4, 5)	223	2	Defeated Masanobu Kurisu and Isamu Teranishi in a tournament final.	
45	Footloose/Revolution (Samson Fuyuki and Toshiaki Kawada)	March 9, 1988	Live event	Yokohama, Japan	1	184	2		
46	Shinichi Nakano and Shunji Takano	September 9, 1988	Live event	Chiba, Japan	1	6	0		
47	Footloose/Revolution (Samson Fuyuki and Toshiaki Kawada)	September 15, 1988	Live event	Tokyo, Japan	2	263	4		
48	The Can-Am Express (Doug Furnas and Dan Kroffat)	June 5, 1989	Live event	Tokyo, Japan	1	137	3		
49	Footloose/Revolution (Samson Fuyuki and Toshiaki Kawada)	October 20, 1989	Live event	Nagoya, Japan	3	133	1		
50	The Can-Am Express (Doug Furnas and Dan Kroffat)	March 2, 1990	Live event	Nagoya, Japan	2	38	1		
51	Kenta Kobashi and Tiger Mask II	April 9, 1990	Live event	Okayama, Japan	1	38	0	On May 14, 1990, Tiger Mask II removed his mask and became known by his real name, Mitsuharu Misawa.	
—	Vacated	May 17, 1990	—	—	—	—	—	Vacated so Misawa could focus on his singles career.	
52	Shinichi Nagano and Akira Taue	June 5, 1990	Live event	Chiba, Japan	1 (2, 1)	14	0	Defeated Davey Boy Smith and Johnny Smith.	
—	Vacated	June 19, 1990	—	—	—	—	—	Nakano left AJPW to join Super World of Sports.	
53	Johnny Ace and Kenta Kobashi	September 7, 1990	Live event	Fukui, Japan	1 (1, 2)	(Note: The date the championship was either won or lost is uncertain, which means that the reign lasted between 147 and 174 days.)	2	Defeated Bobby Fulton and Tommy Rogers.	
—	Vacated	February 1991	—	—	—	—	—	Johnny Ace was injured.	
54	The British Bruisers (The Dynamite Kid and Johnny Smith)	April 6, 1991	Live event	Osaka, Japan	1	14	0	Defeated Tsuyoshi Kikuchi and Kenta Kobashi.	
55	The Can-Am Express (Doug Furnas and Dan Kroffat)	April 20, 1991	Live event	Tokyo, Japan	3	79	2		
56	Johnny Ace and Kenta Kobashi	July 8, 1991	Live event	Osaka, Japan	2 (2, 3)	10	0		
57	Billy Black and Joel Deaton	July 18, 1991	Live event	Tokyo, Japan	1	8	0		
58	The Can-Am Express (Doug Furnas and Dan Kroffat)	July 26, 1991	Live event	Matsudo, Japan	4	304	3		
59	Super Generation Army (Tsuyoshi Kikuchi and Kenta Kobashi)	May 25, 1992	Live event	Sendai, Japan	1 (1, 4)	373	3		
60	The Eagle and The Patriot	June 2, 1993	Live event	Koyama, Japan	1	99	1		
61	The Can-Am Express (Doug Furnas and Dan Kroffat)	September 9, 1993	Live event	Saitama, Japan	5	452	3		
—	Vacated	December 5, 1994	—	—	—	—	—	Vacated so Furnas and Kroffat could focus on the World Tag Team Championship.	
62	Jun Akiyama and Takao Omori	January 29, 1995	Live event	Tokyo, Japan	1	1,076	12	Defeated Bobby Fulton and Tommy Rogers in a tournament final.	
63	Wolf Hawkfield and Johnny Smith	January 9, 1998	Live event	Kagoshima, Japan	1 (1, 2)	270	3		
64	Tamon Honda and Jun Izumida	October 6, 1998	Live event	Niigata, Japan	1	130	1		
65	Hayabusa and Jinsei Shinzaki	February 13, 1999	Live event	Tokyo, Japan	1	111	1	Won the title at Fan Appreciation Day.	
66	No Fear (Takao Omori and Yoshihiro Takayama)	June 4, 1999	Summer Action Series II Tour	Sapporo, Japan	1 (2, 1)	82	0	Also held the World Tag Team titles.	
67	Untouchables (Mitsuharu Misawa and Yoshinari Ogawa)	August 25, 1999	Summer Action Series II Tour	Hiroshima, Japan	1 (2, 1)	<1	0	This match was also for Omori and Takayama's World Tag Team titles.	
—	Vacated	August 25, 1999	—	Hiroshima, Japan	—	—	—	Vacated so other wrestlers could hold the titles.	
68	Tamon Honda and Masao Inoue	October 25, 1999	October Giant Series Tour	Nagaoka, Japan	1 (2, 1)	235	3	Defeated Maunakea Mossman and Johnny Smith in a tournament final.	
—	Vacated	June 16, 2000	—	—	—	—	—	Vacated due to Honda, Inoue and several others leaving AJPW to form Pro Wrestling Noah.	
69	Masahito Kakihara and Mitsuya Nagai	June 8, 2001	Super Power Series Tour	Tokyo, Japan	1	(Note: The date the championship was either won or lost is uncertain, which means that the reign lasted between 54 and 83 days.)	0	Defeated Shinya Makabe and Yuji Nagata.	
—	Vacated	August 2001	—	—	—	—	—	Kakihara suffered a knee injury.	
70	Arashi and Koki Kitahara	September 8, 2001	Summer Action Series II	Tokyo, Japan	1	128	2	Defeated Shigeo Okumura and Nobutaka Araya.	
—	Vacated	January 14, 2002	Yokohama, Japan	—	—	—	—	Vacated after losing a non-title match to Yoji Anjo and Genichiro Tenryu.	
71	Arashi and Nobutaka Araya	April 13, 2002	AJPW Grand Champion Carnival	Tokyo, Japan	1 (2, 1)	433	3	Defeated Mitsuya Nagai and Shigeo Okumura.	
—	Vacated	June 20, 2003	—	—	—	—	—	Vacated due to Arashi winning the World Tag Team titles on June 8, 2003.	
72	Rowdy (Kohei Sato and Hirotaka Yokoi)	July 19, 2003	Summer Action Series Tour	Tokyo, Japan	1	83	3	Defeated Turmeric Storm (Tomoaki Honma and Kazushi Miyamoto) in a tournament final.	
73	Kintaro Kanemura and Tetsuhiro Kuroda	October 10, 2003	Live event	Tokyo, Japan	1	65	2	Won the titles on Pro Wrestling ZERO-ONE's Evolution tour.	
—	Vacated	December 14, 2003	—	—	—	—	—	Vacated due to Kanemura suffering from an illness.	
74	Mr. Gannosuke and Tetsuhiro Kuroda	December 25, 2003	Zero-1's Rebel Z Tour	Tokyo, Japan	1 (1, 2)	8	0	Defeated Jun Kasai and Tengu Kaiser.	
75	The Great Kosuke and Shiryu	January 2, 2004	New Year Giant Series Tour	Tokyo, Japan	1	141	4		
76	Masanobu Fuchi and Genichiro Tenryu	May 22, 2004	Rise Up Tour	Tokyo, Japan	1	165	3		
77	Mitsuya Nagai and Masayuki Naruse	November 3, 2004	Chrono Stream ~ Masahiro Chono 20th Anniversary	Tokyo, Japan	1 (2, 1)	91	2		
78	RO&D (Buchanan and Rico)	February 2, 2005	Excite Series Tour	Tokyo, Japan	1	114	0		
—	Vacated	May 27, 2005	—	—	—	—	—	Vacated due to Rico retiring.	
79	Shuji Kondo and "brother" Yasshi	June 19, 2005	Crossover Tour	Tokyo, Japan	1	37	1	Defeated Tomoaki Honma and Katsuhiko Nakajima in a tournament final.	
80	Katsuhiko Nakajima and Kensuke Sasaki	July 26, 2005	Summer Action Series Tour	Tokyo, Japan	1	460	3		
—	Vacated	October 29, 2006	—	—	—	—	—	Vacated due to Sasaki getting injured.	
81	Minoru Suzuki and Nosawa Rongai	January 3, 2009	New Year Shining Series Tour	Tokyo, Japan	1	263	2	Defeated Osamu Nishimura and Masanobu Fuchi in a tournament final.	
82	S.M.O.P. (Akebono and Ryota Hama)	September 23, 2009	Flashing Tour	Tokyo, Japan	1	218	3		
83	Voodoo Murders (Taru and Big Daddy Voodoo)	April 29, 2010	Growin' Up	Tokyo, Japan	1	122	1		
84	New Generation Force (Manabu Soya and Seiya Sanada)	August 29, 2010	AJPW Pro-Wrestling Love in Ryogoku Vol.10	Tokyo, Japan	1	204	2		
85	Strong BJ (Daisuke Sekimoto and Yuji Okabayashi)	March 21, 2011	AJPW Pro-Wrestling Love In Ryogoku Vol. 11	Tokyo, Japan	1	90	2		
86	es (Manabu Soya and Seiya Sanada)	June 19, 2011	AJPW Pro-Wrestling Love In Ryogoku Vol. 12	Tokyo, Japan	2	126	1	Soya and Sanada were previously known as the team of New Generation Force.	
87	Strong BJ (Daisuke Sekimoto and Yuji Okabayashi)	October 23, 2011	Live event	Tokyo, Japan	2	252	6		
88	S.M.O.P. (Akebono and Ryota Hama)	July 1, 2012	NJPW/AJPW New Japan & All Japan 40th Anniversary	Tokyo, Japan	2	65	0		
—	Vacated	September 4, 2012	—	—	—	—	—	Vacated due to Akebono being sidelined with pneumonia.	
89	Junior Stars (Koji Kanemoto and Minoru Tanaka)	October 21, 2012	Live event	Aichi, Japan	1	97	2	Defeated Kazushi Miyamoto and Tomoaki Honma in a tournament final.	
90	Jonetsu Hentai Baka (Hikaru Sato and Hiroshi Yamato)	January 26, 2013	Live event	Tokyo, Japan	1	15	0		
91	Junior Stars (Koji Kanemoto and Minoru Tanaka)	February 10, 2013	Live event	Fukuoka, Japan	2	74	1		
92	Burning (Atsushi Aoki and Kotaro Suzuki)	April 25, 2013	AJPW Champion Carnival 2013 — Day 5	Nagoya, Japan	1	276	4		
93	Burning (Jun Akiyama and Yoshinobu Kanemaru)	January 26, 2014	AJPW New Year's Gift In Kobe	Kobe, Japan	1 (2, 1)	93	3		
94	Team Dream Futures (Keisuke Ishii and Shigehiro Irie)	April 29, 2014	Max Bump 2014	Tokyo, Japan	1	109	4	This was a DDT Pro-Wrestling event.	
95	Xceed (Kotaro Suzuki and Kento Miyahara)	August 16, 2014	Live event	Tokyo, Japan	1 (2, 1)	140	1		
96	Dark Kingdom (Mitsuya Nagai and Takeshi Minamino)	January 3, 2015	Live event	Tokyo, Japan	1 (3, 1)	78	1		
97	Último Dragón and Yoshinobu Kanemaru	March 22, 2015	Live event	Fukuoka, Japan	1 (1, 2)	206	1		
—	Vacated	October 14, 2015	2015 Jr. Tag Battle of Glory	—	—	—	—	Dragón and Kanemaru voluntarily vacated the titles due to losing to Isami Kodaka and Yuko Miyamoto.	
98	Yankii Nichokenju (Isami Kodaka and Yuko Miyamoto)	November 15, 2015	Hachioji Wrestling Festival	Tokyo, Japan	1	252	6	Defeated Kotaro Suzuki and Yohei Nakajima.	
99	Evolution (Atsushi Aoki and Hikaru Sato)	July 24, 2016	BJW Ryogokutan	Tokyo, Japan	1 (2, 2)	126	4		
100	Atsushi Onita and Masanobu Fuchi	November 27, 2016	New Explosion	Tokyo, Japan	1 (1, 2)	205	1		
101	Evolution (Atsushi Aoki and Hikaru Sato)	June 20, 2017	Dynamite Series	Obihiro, Japan	2 (3, 3)	68	2		
102	Black Tiger VII and Taka Michinoku	August 27, 2017	45th Anniversary	Tokyo, Japan	1 (2, 1)	34	0	Black Tiger VII previously held the title under the name Nosawa Rongai.	
103	Nextream (Naoya Nomura and Yuma Aoyagi)	September 30, 2017	Raising An Army Memorial Series	Maebashi, Japan	1	119	4		
—	Vacated	January 27, 2018	—	—	—	—	—	Vacated due to Aoyagi being sidelined with a ankle injury.	
104	Jun Akiyama and Yuji Nagata	February 3, 2018	2018 Yokohama Twilight Blues	Yokohama, Japan	1 (3, 1)	176	2	Defeated Naoya Nomura and Ryoji Sai.	
105	Nextream (Naoya Nomura and Yuma Aoyagi)	July 29, 2018	2018 Summer Action Series	Osaka, Japan	2	211	4		
—	Vacated	February 25, 2019	—	—	—	—	—	Vacated due to Nomura and Aoyagi splitting up.	
106	Sweeper (Jake Lee and Koji Iwamoto)	March 21, 2019	2019 Dream Power Series	Nagoya, Japan	1	45	0	Won the vacant titles by defeating Daichi Hashimoto and Hideyoshi Kamitani in a tournament final.	
107	Ryuichi Kawakami and Kazumi Kikuta	May 5, 2019	BJW Endless Survival 2019	Yokohama, Japan	1	44	1		
108	Sweeper (Jake Lee and Koji Iwamoto)	June 18, 2019	2019 Dynamite Series	Tokyo, Japan	2	279	4		
109	Yankee Two Kenju (Isami Kodaka and Yuko Miyamoto)	March 23, 2020	Dream Power Series	Tokyo, Japan	2	145	3		
110	Purple Haze (Zeus and Izanagi)	August 15, 2020	Summer Action Series II - Night 1: Atsushi Aoki Memorial Show ~ AA Forever	Tokyo, Japan	1	388	6		
111	StrongHearts (El Lindaman and T-Hawk)	September 7, 2021	AJPW Super Deluxe Series	Tokyo, Japan	1	117	2		
112	Total Eclipse (Yusuke Kodama and Hokuto Omori)	January 2, 2022	New Year Wars - Night 1	Tokyo, Japan	1	193	6		
113	Voodoo Murders (Minoru and Toshizo)	July 14, 2022	Summer Action Series 2022	Tokyo, Japan	1 (3, 1)	66	2		
114	Evolution (Dan Tamura and Hikaru Sato)	September 18, 2022	AJPW 50th Anniversary	Tokyo, Japan	1 (1, 4)	42	1		
115	Tajiri and Yoshitatsu	October 30, 2022	AJPW Raising An Army Memorial Series 2022 - Halloween ManiaX	Tokyo, Japan	1	28	1		
116	Gungnir Of Anarchy (Masao Hanahata and Yusuke Kodama)	November 27, 2022	Real World Tag League 2022	Fujisawa, Japan	1 (1, 2)	10	0		
117	Masao Inoue and Takao Omori	December 7, 2022	Real World Tag League 2022	Tokyo, Japan	1 (2, 3)	27	0	This was a four-way match also including Tajiri and Yoshitatsu, and Black Menso-re and ATM.	
118	Kendo Kashin and Nosawa Rongai	January 3, 2023	AJPW New Year Giant Series 2023	Tokyo, Japan	1 (1, 3)	32	0		
119	Atsushi Onita and Yoshitatsu	February 4, 2023	AJPW Excite Series 2023	Tokyo, Japan	1 (2, 2)	226	5		
DDT Pro-Wrestling (DDT)
120	Burning (Jun Akiyama and Kotaro Suzuki)	September 18, 2023	Dramatic Explosion 2023	Nagoya, Japan	1 (4, 3)	46	1	This was a DDT Pro-Wrestling event.	
121	Eruption (Hideki Okatani and Yukio Sakaguchi)	November 3, 2023	Road To Ultimate Party 2023 in Shinjuku	Tokyo, Japan	1	72	1	This was a DDT Pro-Wrestling event.	
122	Atsushi Onita and Toy Kojima	January 14, 2024	Shinshun Denryū Bakuha! 2024	Yokohama, Japan	1 (3, 1)	76	0	This was an Electric Blast Bat & Boards Deathmatch held at a DDT Pro-Wrestling event. On February 14, 2024, Kojima changed his ring name to To-y.	
123	Evolution (Dan Tamura and Hikaru Sato)	March 30, 2024	AJPW Dream Power Series 2024	Tokyo, Japan	2 (2, 5)	86	1		
All Japan Pro Wrestling (AJPW)
124	Musashi and Seiki Yoshioka	June 24, 2024	AJPW Dynamite Series 2024	Tokyo, Japan	1	111	4		
125	ELPIDA (Yuma Anzai and Rising Hayato)	October 13, 2024	AJPW Raising An Army Memorial Series 2024	Tokyo, Japan	1	245	6		
126	Atsuki Aoyagi and Yuma Aoyagi	June 15, 2025	AJPW Super Power Series 2025	Kyoto, Japan	1 (1, 3)	92	0		
127	Musashi and Seiki Yoshioka	September 15, 2025	AJPW Oudou Tournament 2025	Tokyo, Japan	2	107	2		
128	Gajadokuro (Ishin and Yoshiki Kato)	December 31, 2025	AJPW New Year's Eve 2025	Tokyo, Japan	1	18	0		
Dragongate
129	Don Fujii and Masaaki Mochizuki	January 18, 2026	DG Open The New Year Gate 2026	Tokyo, Japan	1	91	1	This was a Dragongate event. AJPW senior referee Kyohei Wada served as the special guest referee.	
130	Genki Horiguchi and Yasushi Kanda	April 19, 2026	DG The Gate Of Passion 2026	Fukuoka, Japan	1	46	0	This was a Dragongate event.	
131	Gajadokuro (Ishin and Yoshiki Kato)	June 4, 2026	DG Rainbow Gate 2026	Tokyo, Japan	2	14	0	This was a Dragongate event. AJPW senior referee Kyohei Wada served as the special guest referee.	
132	Atsuki Aoyagi and Rising Hayato	June 18, 2026	AJPW Super Power Series 2026	Tokyo, Japan	1 (2, 2)	49	1		
—	Vacated	August 6, 2026	—	—	—	—	—	The titles were vacated after Aoyagi injured his ACL.	
133	Musashi and Seiki Yoshioka	October 11, 2026	AJPW Raising An Army Memorial Series 2026	Sendai, Japan	3	42+	1	Defeated Dan Tamura and Seigo Tachibana for the vacant titles.	

== Combined reigns ==
As of November 22, 2026.

†	Indicates the current champion
¤	The exact length of at least one title reign is uncertain, so the shortest possible length is used.

=== By team ===
Rank	Team	No. of reigns	Combined defenses	Combined days
1	King Kong Czaya and Tiger Joginder Singh	1	¤N/A	¤1,660
2	Rikidōzan and Toyonobori	4	0	1,123
3	Jun Akiyama and Takao Omori	1	12	1,076
4	The Great Kojika and Motoshi Okuma	4	9	1,056
5	The Can-Am Express (Doug Furnas and Dan Kroffat)	5	10	1,009
6	Antonio Inoki and Michiaki Yoshimura	3	4	982
7	Takashi Ishikawa and Akio Sato	2	4	663
8	Mighty Inoue and Takashi Ishikawa	2	3	587
9	Footloose/Revolution (Samson Fuyuki and Toshiaki Kawada)	3	7	580
10	Giant Baba and Toyonobori	2	¤N/A	544
11	Kintarō Ōki and Michiaki Yoshimura	3	6	¤478
12	Katsuhiko Nakajima and Kensuke Sasaki	1	3	460
13	Arashi and Nobutaka Araya	1	3	433
14	Seiji Sakaguchi and Michiaki Yoshimura	1	1	415
15	Yankii Nichokenju/Yankee Two Kenju (Isami Kodaka and Yuko Miyamoto)	2	9	397
16	Purple Haze (Zeus and Izanagi)	1	6	388
17	Super Generation Army (Tsuyoshi Kikuchi and Kenta Kobashi)	1	3	373
18	Ashura Hara and Mighty Inoue	1	8	368
19	Strong BJ (Daisuke Sekimoto and Yuji Okabayashi)	2	8	342
20	New Generation Force/es (Manabu Soya and Seiya Sanada)	2	3	330
21	Nextream (Naoya Nomura and Yuma Aoyagi)	2	8	329
22	Sweeper (Jake Lee and Koji Iwamoto)	2	4	324
23	S.M.O.P (Akebono and Ryota Hama)	2	3	283
24	Burning (Atsushi Aoki and Kotaro Suzuki)	1	4	276
25	Wolf Hawkfield and Johnny Smith	1	3	270
26	Minoru Suzuki and Nosawa Rongai	1	2	263
27	Musashi and Seiki Yoshioka †	3	7	260+
28	Ashura Hara and Takashi Ishikawa	1	0	249
29	ELPIDA (Yuma Anzai and Rising Hayato)	1	6	245
30	Samson Kutsuwada and Akihisa Takachiho	1	2	238
31	Tamon Honda and Masao Inoue	1	3	235
32	Atsushi Onita and Yoshitatsu	1	5	226
33	Último Dragón and Yoshinobu Kanemaru	1	1	206
34	Atsushi Onita and Masanobu Fuchi	1	1	205
35	Evolution (Atsushi Aoki and Hikaru Sato)	2	6	194
36	Total Eclipse (Yusuke Kodama and Hokuto Omori)	1	6	193
37	Jun Akiyama and Yuji Nagata	1	2	176
38	Junior Stars (Koji Kanemoto and Minoru Tanaka)	2	3	171
39	Masanobu Fuchi and Genichiro Tenryu	1	3	165
40	Johnny Ace and Kenta Kobashi	2	2	¤157-184
41	Antonio Inoki and Kintarō Ōki	1	¤N/A	150
42	The Great Kosuke and Shiryu	1	4	141
43	Xceed (Kotaro Suzuki and Kento Miyahara)	1	1	140
44	Tamon Honda and Jun Izumida	1	1	130
45	Evolution (Dan Tamura and Hikaru Sato)	2	2	128
45	Arashi and Koki Kitahara	1	2	128
47	Giant Baba and Michiaki Yoshimura	1	¤N/A	127
48	Voodoo Murders (Taru and Big Daddy Voodoo)	1	1	122
49	StrongHearts (El Lindaman and T-Hawk)	1	2	117
50	RO&D (Buchanan and Rico)	1	0	114
51	Hayabusa and Jinsei Shinzaki	1	1	111
52	Team Dream Futures (Keisuke Ishii and Shigehiro Irie)	1	4	109
53	Animal Hamaguchi and Mighty Inoue	1	4	108
54	The Eagle and The Patriot	1	1	99
55	Burning (Jun Akiyama and Yoshinobu Kanemaru)	1	3	93
56	Atsuki Aoyagi and Yuma Aoyagi	1	0	92
57	Mitsuya Nagai and Masayuki Naruse	1	2	91
57	Don Fujii and Masaaki Mochizuki	1	1	91
59	Toyonobori and Michiaki Yoshimura	1	¤N/A	84
60	Rowdy (Kohei Sato and Hirotaka Yokoi)	1	3	83
61	No Fear (Takao Omori and Yoshihiro Takayama)	1	0	82
62	Dark Kingdom (Mitsuya Nagai and Takeshi Minamino)	1	1	78
63	Atsushi Onita and Toy Kojima	1	0	76
64	Eruption (Hideki Okatani and Yukio Sakaguchi)	1	1	72
65	Voodoo Murders (Minoru and Toshizo)	1	2	66
66	Kintaro Kanemura and Tetsuhiro Kuroda	1	2	65
67	Masahito Kakihara and Mitsuya Nagai	1	0	¤54-83
68	Atsuki Aoyagi and Rising Hayato	1	1	49
69	The Great Kojika and Gentetsu Matsuoka	1	0	48
70	Burning (Jun Akiyama and Kotaro Suzuki)	1	1	46
70	Genki Horiguchi and Yasushi Kanda	1	0	46
72	Ryuichi Kawakami and Kazumi Kikuta	1	1	44
73	The Destroyer and Billy Red Lyons	1	¤N/A	42
74	Kenta Kobashi and Tiger Mask	1	0	38
75	Shuji Kondo and "brother" Yasshi	1	1	37
76	Black Tiger VII and Taka Michinoku	1	0	34
77	Gajadokuro (Ishin and Yoshiki Kato)	2	0	32
77	Kendo Kashin and Nosawa Rongai	1	0	32
79	Hiro Matsuda and Michiaki Yoshimura	1	1	30
80	Tajiri and Yoshitatsu	1	1	28
81	Buddy Austin and Mike Sharpe	1	0	27
81	Masao Inoue and Takao Omori	1	0	27
83	Klondike Bill and Skull Murphy	1	0	22
84	The Oates Brothers (Jerry Oates and Ted Oates)	1	0	19
84	The Von Erichs (David Von Erich and Kerry Von Erich)	1	0	19
86	Calypso Hurricane and Gene Kiniski	1	¤N/A	15
86	Jonetsu Hentai Baka (Hikaru Sato and Hiroshi Yamato)	1	0	15
88	Shinichi Nagano and Akira Taue	1	0	14
88	The British Bruisers (The Dynamite Kid and Johnny Smith)	1	0	14
90	Luther Lindsay and Ricky Waldo	1	0	12
91	Gungnir Of Anarchy (Masao Hanahata and Yusuke Kodama)	1	0	10
92	Billy Black and Joel Deaton	1	0	8
92	Mr. Gannosuke and Tetsuhiro Kuroda	1	0	8
94	Shinichi Nagano and Shunji Takano	1	0	6
95	Dan Miller and Frank Valois	1	0	5
96	Eddie Graham and Killer Karl Kox	1	¤N/A	4
97	Joe Carollo and Killer Karl Kox	1	¤N/A	2
98	Untouchables (Mitsuharu Misawa and Yoshinari Ogawa)	1	0	<1

=== By wrestler ===
*Combined defense statistics might be inaccurate in the case of the 1960s and 1970s when the titles were rarely defended or the documentation about title matches were uncertain.

Rank	Wrestler	No. of reigns	Combined defenses	Combined days
1	Michiaki Yoshimura	10	12	2,116
2	Toyonobori	7	¤N/A	1,751
3	Takashi Ishikawa	5	7	1,499
4	Jun Akiyama	4	18	1,391
5	Takao Omori	3	12	1,185
6	Antonio Inoki	4	4	1,132
7	Rikidōzan	4	¤N/A	1,123
8	The Great Kojika	4	4	1,104
9	Motoshi Okuma	4	9	1,056
10	Mighty Inoue	4	15	1,038
11	Doug Furnas	5	12	1,009
11	Dan Kroffat	5	12	1,009
13	Giant Baba	3	0	671
14	Akio Sato	2	4	663
15	Kenta Kobashi	4	5	632
16	Kintarō Ōki	4	6	628
17	Ashura Hara	2	8	592
18	Samson Fuyuki	3	7	580
18	Toshiaki Kawada	3	7	580
20	Arashi	2	5	561
21	Atsushi Onita	3	6	507
22	Atsushi Aoki	3	10	470
23	Kotaro Suzuki	3	6	462
24	Katsuhiko Nakajima	1	3	460
24	Kensuke Sasaki	1	3	460
26	Nobutaka Araya	1	3	433
27	Yuma Aoyagi	3	8	421
28	Seiji Sakaguchi	1	1	415
29	Isami Kodaka	2	9	397
29	Yuko Miyamoto	2	9	397
31	Zeus	1	6	388
31	Izanagi	1	6	388
33	Tsuyoshi Kikuchi	1	3	373
34	Masanobu Fuchi	2	4	370
35	Tamon Honda	2	4	365
36	Yuji Okabayashi	2	8	342
36	Daisuke Sekimoto	2	8	342
38	Hikaru Sato	5	10	337
39	Seiya Sanada	2	3	330
39	Manabu Soya	2	3	330
41	Nosawa Rongai/Black Tiger VII	3	2	329
41	Naoya Nomura	2	8	329
43	Jake Lee	2	4	324
43	Koji Iwamoto	2	4	324
45	Yoshinobu Kanemaru	2	4	299
46	Rising Hayato	2	7	294
47	Johnny Smith	2	3	284
48	Akebono	2	3	283
48	Ryota Hama	2	3	283
50	Wolf Hawkfield	1	3	270
51	Minoru Suzuki	1	2	263
52	Masao Inoue	2	3	262
53	Musashi †	3	7	260+
53	Seiki Yoshioka †	3	7	260+
55	Yoshitatsu	2	6	254
56	Yuma Anzai	1	6	245
57	Samson Kutsuwada	1	2	238
57	Akihisa Takachiho	1	2	238
59	Minoru/Minoru Tanaka	3	5	237
60	Mitsuya Nagai	3	3	223
61	Johnny Ace	2	2	221
62	Último Dragón	1	1	206
63	Yusuke Kodama	2	6	203
64	Hokuto Omori	1	6	193
65	Yuji Nagata	1	2	176
66	Koji Kanemoto	2	3	171
67	Genichiro Tenryu	1	3	165
68	The Great Kosuke	1	4	141
68	Shiryu	1	4	141
68	Atsuki Aoyagi	2	1	141
71	Kento Miyahara	1	1	140
72	Jun Izumida	1	1	130
73	Dan Tamura	2	2	128
73	Koki Kitahara	1	1	128
75	Big Daddy Voodoo	1	1	122
75	Taru	1	1	122
77	El Lindaman	1	2	117
77	T-Hawk	1	2	117
79	Buchanan	1	0	114
79	Rico	1	0	114
81	Hayabusa	1	1	111
81	Jinsei Shinzaki	1	1	111
83	Shigehiro Irie	1	4	109
83	Keisuke Ishii	1	4	109
85	Animal Hamaguchi	1	4	108
86	Don Fujii	1	1	91
86	Masaaki Mochizuki	1	1	91
88	Takeshi Minamino	1	1	78
89	Toy Kojima	1	0	76
90	Hideki Okatani	1	1	72
90	Yukio Sakaguchi	1	1	72
92	Toshizo	1	2	66
93	Genki Horiguchi	1	0	46
93	Yasushi Kanda	1	0	46
95	Ryuichi Kawakami	1	1	44
95	Kazumi Kikuta	1	1	44
97	Billy Red Lyons	1	¤N/A	42
97	The Destroyer	1	¤N/A	42
99	Tiger Mask II/Mitsuharu Misawa	2	0	38
100	Taka Michinoku	1	0	34
101	Ishin	2	0	32
101	Yoshiki Kato	2	0	32
101	Kendo Kashin	1	0	32
104	Tajiri	1	1	28
105	Buddy Austin	1	0	27
105	Mike Sharpe	1	0	27
107	Jerry Oates	1	0	19
107	Ted Oates	1	0	19
107	David Von Erich	1	0	19
107	Kerry Von Erich	1	0	19
111	Calypso Hurricane	1	¤N/A	15
111	Gene Kiniski	1	¤N/A	15
113	Luther Lindsay	1	0	12
113	Ricky Waldo	1	0	12
115	Masao Hanahata	1	0	10
116	Killer Karl Kox	2	¤N/A	6
117	Dan Miller	1	0	5
117	Frank Valois	1	0	5
119	Eddie Graham	1	¤N/A	4
120	Joe Carollo	1	¤N/A	2

== See also ==
- Japan Pro Wrestling Alliance
- Triple Crown Heavyweight Championship
- World Tag Team Championship
- World Junior Heavyweight Championship
