= Takeshi Morishima =

Japanese former professional wrestler (born 1978)

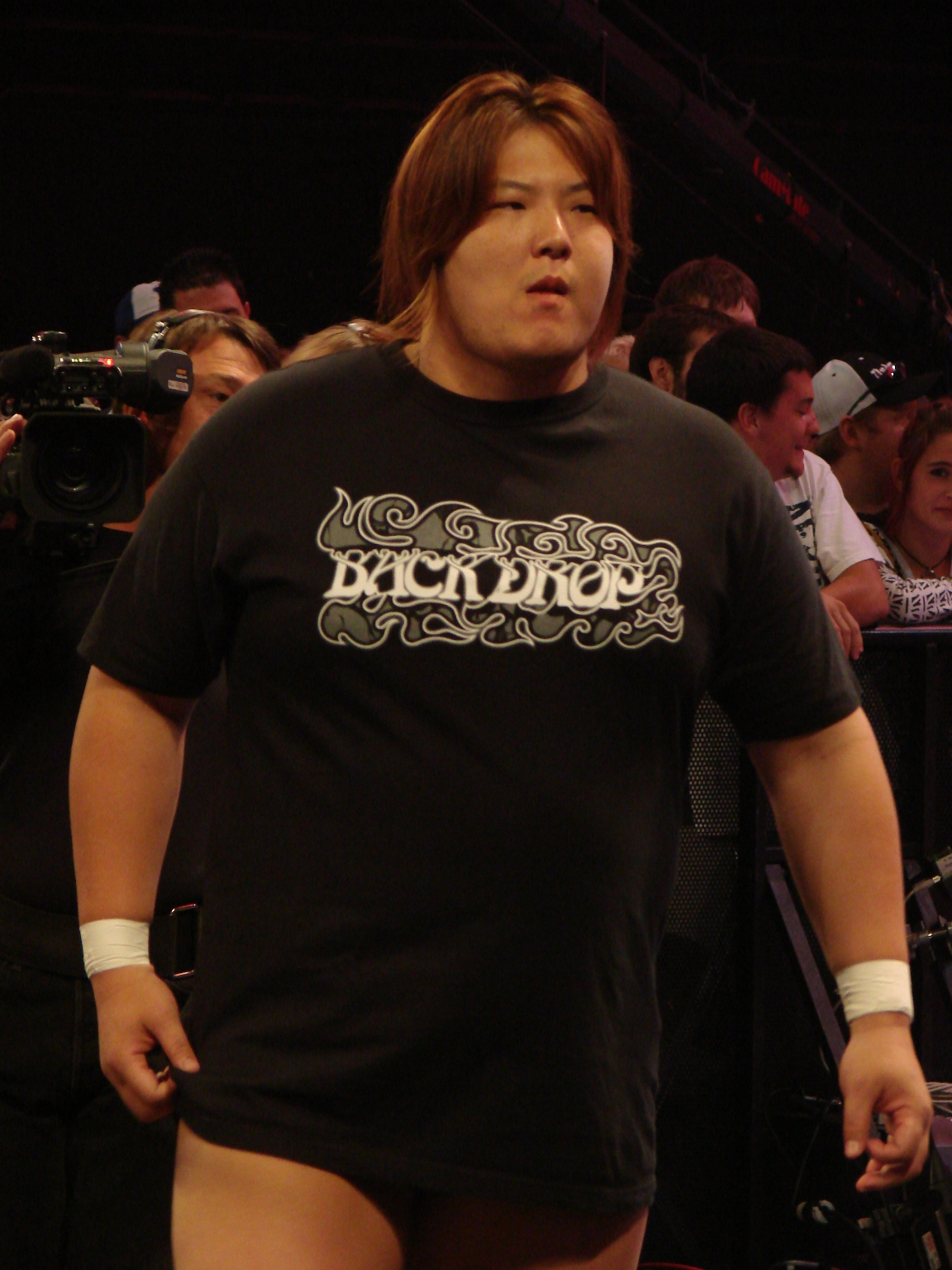
- Morishima in 2008 during his WWE tryout

Personal information
- Born: October 15, 1978 (age 48) Edogawa, Tokyo, Japan

Professional wrestling career
- Ring name(s): Morishima; Takeshi Morishima
- Billed height: 1.90 m (6 ft 3 in)
- Billed weight: 130 kg (287 lb)
- Trained by: Akira Taue; All Japan Pro Wrestling; Mitsuharu Misawa
- Debut: March 22, 1998
- Retired: 2015

Takeshi Morishima (森嶋 猛, Morishima Takeshi) (born October 15, 1978) is a Japanese former professional wrestler.

Morishima is best known for his work with Pro Wrestling Noah, where he is a former three-time GHC Heavyweight Champion. He has also performed for Ring of Honor (ROH) in the United States in the past where he was a one-time ROH World Champion.

== Professional wrestling career ==
=== All Japan Pro Wrestling (1998–2000) ===
Morishima attended Urayasu High School where he took part in judo. His instructor, Shoji Abe, was friends with Mitsuharu Misawa, and managed to get Morishima a tryout with All Japan Pro Wrestling, which he passed and shortly after began training with the promotion for a career in professional wrestling. Initially, Morishima was a protégé of Misawa, but after Naomichi Marufuji joined the promotion and Misawa decided instead to focus solely on training Marufuji, Akira Taue took Morishima under his wing and trained him. Morishima debuted for All Japan in 1998, but left in 2000 to join the newly formed Pro Wrestling Noah (founded by Misawa), where he became a mainstay.

=== Pro Wrestling Noah (2000–2015) ===
In Noah, he frequently teamed with Takeshi Rikio as Wild II, and the duo have previously held the GHC Tag Team Championship.

On March 2, 2008, Morishima defeated Mitsuharu Misawa at the Budokan Hall Event of Pro Wrestling Noah's Second Navigation Tour to become the 12th GHC Heavyweight Champion. On June 14, 2008, Morishima made his very first defense of the GHC Heavyweight Title against Takashi Sugiura. Morishima prevailed after hitting a backdrop driver. Morishima's second defense happened on July 18, 2008 against former his tag team partner Takeshi Rikio. After about 13 and a half minutes, Morishima defeated Rikio with a backdrop suplex. On September 6, 2008 at the Tokyo Nippon Budokan, Morishima lost to Kensuke Sasaki, who gained a pin at the 22-minute mark with the Northern Lights Bomb. On December 7, 2008, Morishima faced Jun Akiyama for the number one contender's spot for the GHC Heavyweight Championship; which he lost to Akiyama. On September 21, 2009 in Nagoya, Japan, Morishima and Sasaki defeated Akitoshi Saito and Bison Smith for the GHC Tag Team Championship. However, on December 6, at the last show of Winter Navigation '09, Morishima and Sasaki lost the titles to Takeshi Rikio and Muhammad Yone.

Morishima in 2011

Morishima appeared on the TV Drama in Japan, "Hesitation I Come" during his time off due to a foot injury. However, on November 23, during (Noah Winter Navigation 2010 - Day 4), Morishima returned to Noah teaming with Kensuke Sasaki and defeating Shuhei Taniguchi and Takashi Sugiura. On January 22, 2012, Morishima defeated Go Shiozaki to win the GHC Heavyweight Championship for the second time. Since this victory, Morishima has defended against Naomichi Marufuji, Maybach Taniguchi, Go Shiozaki, Akitoshi Saito, Kenta, Jun Akiyama, and Kohei Sato. After a year-long reign, Morishima lost the GHC Heavyweight Championship to Kenta on January 27, 2013. On January 5, 2014, Morishima defeated Kenta to win the GHC Heavyweight Championship for the third time. Post-match, Morishima quit Brave to form a new group with Kenoh and Maybach Taniguchi, later named Choukibou-gun, turning heel in the process. On January 25, Morishima and Taniguchi defeated TMDK (Mikey Nicholls and Shane Haste), with help from Kenoh and new stablemate Hajime Ohara, to win the GHC Tag Team Championship. On February 8, Morishima lost the GHC Heavyweight Championship to New Japan Pro-Wrestling representative Yuji Nagata in his first title defense. On May 31, Morishima and Taniguchi lost the GHC Tag Team Championship to Masato Tanaka and Takashi Sugiura.

=== American promotions (2003–2008) ===
Morishima has also wrestled in the United States. He competed in Harley Race's World League Wrestling promotion in 2003, defending the WLW Heavyweight Championship, which he had won from Ron Harris while Harris toured Japan. Morishima returned to the United States in February 2007, wrestling four matches with Ring of Honor. He lost to Samoa Joe on February 16, 2007 before defeating Homicide in a match for the ROH World Championship on the subsequent evening, thus becoming the first non-American to hold the title. On February 23, 2007, Morishima defeated B. J. Whitmer in his first title defense, and on the next night he and Nigel McGuinness defeated Samoa Joe and Homicide. On March 4, 2007, he successfully defended the ROH Championship in Japan, defeating Kenta in the Nippon Budokan in Tokyo. Morishima could not return to the United States until almost a month and a half later when he and Chris Hero took on Nigel McGuinness and Doug Williams, and the next night when he successfully defended the belt against McGuinness for the first time.

On April 21, 2007, Morishima was honored at the 42nd annual Cauliflower Alley Club banquet, being presented with the "Future Legend" award. Back in ROH, Morishima went on a string of successful title defenses, defeating the likes of Austin Aries, Shingo, Jay Briscoe, and Roderick Strong. Morishima also competed twice on ROH's first pay-per-view Respect Is Earned, defeating B. J. Whitmer to retain the ROH Championship, and later teaming with Bryan Danielson to defeat Nigel McGuinness and Kenta. At the second pay-per-view, Driven, Morishima again competed twice, retaining the title against Jimmy Rave and later Adam Pearce. On July 16, 2007, Morishima wrestled in the main event of Ring of Honor's debut show in Japan and defeated Nigel McGuinness to retain the ROH Championship. Morishima lost the title to McGuinness at Undeniable on October 6.

In August 2008 Morishima had a dark match tryout against Charlie Haas for WWE before a live Raw in Chicago, defeating Haas in 3 minutes with a missile dropkick. He then beat Jamie Noble the following night in another dark match, this time for SmackDown. Later in 2008, he traveled back to the United States to face Bryan Danielson for ROH's Final Battle 2008, which he lost. This marked Morishima's last appearance in America.

=== AAA (2008–2010) ===
Through Noah's working relationship with AAA, Morishima has made several trips to Mexico. On March 19, 2010, Morishima teamed up with Taiji Ishimori to defeat La Hermandad 187 ("The Brotherhood of 187"; Nicho el Millonario and Joe Líder) to win the AAA World Tag Team Championship, representing the AAA heel faction La Legión Extranjera ("The Foreign Legion"). On May 23, 2010, Morishima and Ishimori lost the AAA World Tag Team Championship to the team of Atsushi Aoki and Go Shiozaki during Pro Wrestling Noah's Navigation with Breeze show in Niigata, Niigata, Japan.

=== Retirement (2015) ===
In April 2015, Morishima was forced to pull out of the 2015 Global Tag League due to an injury. On April 21, Noah announced that a blood test had revealed that Morishima had an abnormally high glycated hemoglobin, suggesting diabetes. Following his doctor's recommendation, Morishima decided to immediately retire from professional wrestling. On December 28, 2015, Noah canceled Morishima's retirement ceremony, announcing that his contract with the promotion would expire at the end of the year. Later, Morishima recognized the diabetes wasn't the reason of his retirement, but a bad physical and mental state.

=== Canceled return to the ring (2018) ===
On July 10, 2018, it was announced that Morishima was set to make his in-ring return in late 2018 at a show produced by Riki Choshu. The show, initially named Genesis, was scheduled to take place on October 15, but was cancelled after Morishima announced he required emergency surgery for arthritis in his foot.

== Personal life ==
On November 4, 2018, Morishima was arrested at 11:30pm local time in Kabukichō, Tokyo after assaulting a taxi driver. Morishima allegedly refused to pay the 18,000 Yen the driver asked for and then punched him in the face, breaking both of his cheekbones. Morishima accepted the charges, saying "there is no doubt there was an argument".

== Championships and accomplishments ==
- 3 Count Wrestling
  - 3CW Heavyweight Championship (1 time)
- AAA
  - AAA World Tag Team Championship (1 time) – with Taiji Ishimori
- Cauliflower Alley Club
  - Future Legend Award (2007)
- Nikkan Sports
  - Best Tag Team Award (2006) with Muhammad Yone
  - Outstanding Performance Award (2007)
- Pro Wrestling Illustrated
  - Ranked No. 10 of the 500 best singles wrestlers in the PWI 500 in 2007
- Pro Wrestling Noah
  - GHC Heavyweight Championship (3 times)
  - GHC Tag Team Championship (5 times) – with Takeshi Rikio (1), Muhammad Yone (2), Kensuke Sasaki (1) and Maybach Taniguchi (1)
  - Global League (2011)
  - One Day Heavyweight Six Man Tag Team Tournament (2008) – with Mitsuharu Misawa and Muhammad Yone
  - One Night Six Man Tag Tournament (2012) – with Kensuke Sasaki and Kento Miyahara
- Ring of Honor
  - ROH World Championship (1 time)
- Tokyo Sports
  - Fighting Spirit Award (2007)
  - Outstanding Performance Award (2012)
- World League Wrestling
  - WLW Heavyweight Championship (2 times)
- Wrestling Observer Newsletter
  - Best Brawler (2007)
  - Match of the Year (2007) vs. Bryan Danielson at Manhattan Mayhem II on August 25
  - Most Improved (2006)
