= Yuma Anzai =

Japanese professional wrestler

Personal information
- Born: May 15, 1999 (age 27) Annaka, Gunma, Japan

Professional wrestling career
- Ring name: Yuma Anzai
- Billed height: 188 cm (6 ft 2 in)
- Billed weight: 105 kg (231 lb)
- Trained by: Yuma Aoyagi; Yuji Nagata
- Debut: September 18, 2022

Yuma Anzai (安齊勇馬, Anzai Yūma; born May 15, 1999) is a Japanese professional wrestler, He is currently working in All Japan Pro Wrestling (AJPW). He is a former one-time Triple Crown Heavyweight Champion and became the youngest wrestler to hold the title at 24 years and 350 days old. He also former one-time All Asia Tag Team Champion alongside Rising Hayato.

== Professional wrestling career ==
=== All Japan Pro Wrestling (2022–present) ===
Anzai made his professional wrestling debut at All Japan Pro Wrestling 50th Anniversary on September 18, 2022, where he fell short to one of his coaches Yuji Nagata in singles competition.

During his time in the company, Anzai competed in various signature events promoted by it. As for the Real World Tag League, he made his first appearance at the 2022 edition where he teamed up with Yuji Nagata and scored a total of six points after competing against the teams of Kento Miyahara and Takuya Nomura, Shuji Ishikawa and Cyrus, Jake Lee and Yuma Aoyagi, Suwama and Kono, Jun Saito & Rei Saito, Kuma Arashi and Koji Doi, and Shotaro Ashino and Ryuki Honda. At the 2023 edition of the tournament, Anzai teamed up with Ryuki Honda and scored a total of nine points after going against the teams of Katsuhiko Nakajima and Hokuto Omori, Hayato Tamura and Galeno del Mal, Suwama and Hideki Suzuki, Jun Saito & Rei Saito, Yuma Aoyagi and Kento Miyahara, Kuroshio Tokyo Japan and Seigo Tachibana, Yukio Sakaguchi and Hideki Okatani, Cyrus and Ryan Davidson, and Shuji Ishikawa and Ren Ayabe. In the Champion Carnival, Anzai made his first appearance at the 2023 edition where he placed himself in the Block B of the competition, scoring a total of six points after going against Shotaro Ashino, Rei Saito, Shuji Ishikawa, Suwama, Manabu Soya, Hokuto Omori and Takao Omori.

Anzai competed for various championships promoted by AJPW. On the fourth night of the AJPW New Year Giant Series 2024 from January 27, he teamed up with his "New Period" tag team partner Ryuki Honda to unsuccessfully challenge Jun Saito and Rei Saito for the AJPW World Tag Team Championship. On the second night of the AJPW Dream Power Series 2024 from March 30, Anzai defeated Katsuhiko Nakajima to win the Triple Crown Heavyweight Championship, with this victory, Anzai became the youngest Triple Crown Champion in history at 24 years and 320 days old, breaking Kento Miyahara's record at 26 years and 350 days old.

==== Japanese independent circuit (2022–present) ====
Anzai often competes in various promotions from the Japanese independent scene as a developmental talent sent by AJPW.

==== Pro Wrestling Noah (2023–present) ====
He debuted in Pro Wrestling Noah at the N-1 Victory 2023 Eve Festival on August 5, competing in the event's Royal Rumble match, which was won by Manabu Soya and featured other notable participants including Adam Brooks, Lance Anoa'i, and Jack Morris. Anzai participated in the 2023 edition of the N-1 Victory, where he placed himself in the Block B of the competition, scoring a total of four points after going against Go Shiozaki, Manabu Soya, Katsuhiko Nakajima, Lance Anoa'i, El Hijo del Dr. Wagner Jr., Saxon Huxley and Daiki Inaba.

==== New Japan Pro Wrestling (2023) ====
Anzai made several appearances for New Japan Pro Wrestling. At All Together, a cross-over event promoted alongside Noah and AJPW, he teamed up with Suwama and Yuji Nagata to defeat Los Ingobernables de Japon (Tetsuya Naito, Shingo Takagi and Bushi). On the seventh night of the NJPW New Japan Road 2023 from June 18, 2023, Anzai teamed up with Zennichi Shin Jidai stablemates Atsuki Aoyagi, Kento Miyahara and Yuma Aoyagi in a losing effort against Hiroshi Tanahashi, Master Wato, Satoshi Kojima and Yuji Nagata.

==== DDT Pro-Wrestling (2024–present) ====
Anzai made his debut in DDT Pro-Wrestling at DDT Into The Fight 2024 Tour In Shinjuku on February 8, where he teamed up with Ryuki Honda to defeat Rukiya and Takeshi Masada. At Judgement 2024, Anzai and Honda unsuccessfully challenged Burning (Tetsuya Endo and Yuki Iino) for the KO-D Tag Team Championship.

== Championships and accomplishments ==
- All Japan Pro Wrestling
  - Triple Crown Heavyweight Championship (1 time)
  - All Asia Tag Team Championship (1 time) – with Rising Hayato
- Pro Wrestling Illustrated
  - Ranked No. 41 of the top 500 singles wrestlers in the PWI 500 in 2024
- Tokyo Sports
  - Newcomer Award (2022)
  - Outstanding Performance (2024)
- Wrestling Observer Newsletter
  - Rookie of the Year (2023)
