= Tamon Honda =

Japanese professional wrestler

Personal information
- Born: Tamon Honda; August 15, 1963 (age 63) Yokohama, Kanagawa, Japan
- Education: Nihon University
- Family: Keisuke Honda (cousin)

Professional wrestling career
- Billed height: 1.88 m (6 ft 2 in)
- Billed weight: 130 kg (287 lb)
- Trained by: AJPW Dojo; Giant Baba
- Debut: October 8, 1993
- Retired: November 15, 2019

Tamon Honda (本田 多聞, Honda Tamon) (born August 15, 1963) is a Japanese retired professional wrestler and former Olympic amateur wrestler. He is best known for his appearances with All Japan Pro Wrestling and Pro Wrestling Noah. Championships held by Honda include the All Asia Tag Team Championship and GHC Tag Team Championship.

== Amateur wrestling career ==
Tamon Honda began his amateur wrestling career in 1983, while attending Nihon University, competing in freestyle wrestling.

=== 100 kg division ===
In September 1983, Honda wrestled his first tournament, the World Championship, in Kyiv, U.S.S.R., where he placed in seventh. Two months later, he wrestled at the Asian Championship in Tehran, Iran, where he placed first, earning him a gold medal. In 1984, he wrestled at the 1984 Summer Olympics in Los Angeles, California, where he placed fifth. In May 1985, he wrestled at the World Super Championship in Tokyo, where he placed third, earning him a bronze medal. In October 1986, he wrestled in the Asian Games in Seoul, South Korea, where he placed seventh. In August 1987, he wrestled at the World Championship in Clermont-Ferrand, France, where he placed eleventh. In 1988, he returned to Seoul to wrestle at the 1988 Summer Olympics.

=== 130 kg division ===
By 1990, Honda moved up from 100 kg to 130 kg. In September 1990, he wrestled at the Asian Games in Beijing, China, where he placed fourth. In April 1992, he wrestled the Asian Championship in Tehran, Iran, where he placed third, earning him a bronze medal. Later that year, he wrestled in the 1992 Summer Olympics in Barcelona, Spain, where he placed eleventh.

== Professional wrestling career ==
=== All Japan Pro Wrestling (1993–2000) ===
He almost joined All Japan Pro Wrestling in the 1980s, but it wasn't until after he turned 30 years old that he debuted. Although he never reached the main event level many believed he would, Honda held the All Asia Tag Team Championship twice in the late 1990s. He left the promotion in June 2000.

=== Pro Wrestling Noah (2000–2010) ===
After joining Pro Wrestling Noah, he gradually became a regular on the roster, with 2002 and 2003 seeing major progress for him. Honda left NOAH in January 2010, deciding not to sign a new contract with the promotion and become a freelancer.

=== New Japan Pro Wrestling (2010–2011) ===
After NOAH, Honda went to work for New Japan Pro Wrestling.

=== Return to All Japan (2010–2011) ===
Honda returned to All Japan in November 2010 after a 10-year absence.

== Professional wrestling style and persona ==
Honda was nicknamed "Red Demon". His signature moves included the "Dead End" (a deadlift German suplex), the "Tamon's Power" (an elevated powerbomb, "Tamon's Shooter" (an STF), and "Olympic Hell" (a triangle choke).

== Family ==
Honda is married to a piano instructor. He comes from a sporting family. His father Daizaburo was a canoeist who represented Japan in C-2 1000 metres event at the 1964 Tokyo Olympics. His cousin Keisuke Honda is a professional football player who is currently a free agent and is a former Japanese international.

== Championships and accomplishments ==
- All Japan Pro Wrestling
  - All Asia Tag Team Championship (2 times) – with Jun Izumida (1) and Masao Inoue (1)
  - All Asia Tag Team League (1999) - with Masao Inoue
  - Asunaro Cup (1996)
- Pro Wrestling Illustrated
  - Ranked No. 249 of the top 500 singles wrestlers in the PWI 500 in 2006
- Pro Wrestling Noah
  - GHC Tag Team Championship (2 times) – with Kenta Kobashi
  - WEW Tag Team Championship (1 time) – with Naomichi Marufuji
