= Akira Taue =

Japanese professional wrestler and rikishi

Personal information
- Born: May 8, 1961 (age 65) Chichibu, Saitama, Japan

Professional wrestling career
- Ring name(s): Akira Taue; Tamakirin (sumo)
- Billed height: 1.92 m (6 ft 4 in)
- Billed weight: 120 kg (265 lb)
- Trained by: Giant Baba; Jumbo Tsuruta; Kazuharu Sonoda
- Debut: January 2, 1988
- Retired: December 7, 2013

Akira Taue (田上 明, Taue Akira; born May 8, 1961) is a Japanese retired professional wrestler. He is best known for his runs in All Japan Pro Wrestling and Pro Wrestling Noah, where he worked for all of his career in both promotions.

A former sumo wrestler who went under the name Tamakirin Yasumasa (玉麒麟 安正, Tamakirin Yasumasa), he retired from sumo to make his debut in pro-wrestling, where he went under his real name. He is a former Triple Crown Heavyweight Champion, a former GHC Heavyweight Champion. He is one-half of the Holy Demon Army (聖鬼軍, Sei Ki Gun), alongside Toshiaki Kawada, where they won six World Tag Team Championships and two World's Strongest Tag Determination Leagues. In 1993, he was officially dubbed as one of the members of the Four Heavenly Kings (プロレスの四天王, Puroresu no shiten'nō; also called the Four Pillars of Heaven) (Note: Named after the Four Heavenly Kings, this nomenclature was given to the four by Tokyo Sports journalist Shoichi Shibata, and christened by Baba and the magazine.) of AJPW, alongside Kawada, Mitsuharu Misawa, and Kenta Kobashi.

== Early life and sumo career ==
Tamakirin Yasumasa
Personal information
- Native name: 玉麒麟 安正
- Born: Akira Taue; 8 May 1961 (age 65) Saitama, Japan
- Height: 1.91 m (6 ft 3 in)
- Weight: 115 kg (254 lb)

Sport
- Sport: Sumo
- Retired: July, 1987
- Heya: Oshiogawa
- Record: 193-149-7
- Debut: January, 1980
- Highest rank: Jūryō 6 (January, 1987)
- Updated on Nov. 2021

On the 8th of May, 1961 Akira Taue was born the eldest son of a construction worker, in Saitama, Japan. As a teenager and young adult in Kagemori Junior High School, Taue was quite active in various sports such as shotput, baseball and judo. After graduating, Taue would work as a part time auto-mechanic, while attending the Saitama Prefectural Chichibu High School. There Taue was sent a recommendation for the high school's sumo club. He joined the club in his second year of high school, and he won the third place in the national sumo high school championship.

Taue was then invited in the Oshiogawa stable, and made his professional sumo debut, in January 1980. For the first six years of Taue's sumo career he went under his real name, until May 1986, when he was promoted to the rank of jūryō, he was given the shikona of Tamakirin Yasumasa. He fought in the second highest jūryō division for seven tournaments before retiring from sumo in July 1987.

== Professional wrestling career ==
=== All Japan Pro Wrestling (1988–2000) ===
Taue made his debut on January 2, 1988 in a battle royal won by John Tenta. After his debut, Taue would mostly wrestle in the tag team division of AJPW. During this time he along with Shinichi Nakano would win the All Asia Tag Team Championship belts on June 5, 1990. After many from All Japan's roster would leave for Genichiro Tenryu's new promotion, the SWS, Taue would band with Mitsuharu Misawa, Kenta Kobashi and Toshiaki Kawada to form the Super Generation Army. Soon after their formation, Taue would defect to Jumbo Tsuruta's stable, otherwise known as Tsuruta-gun. The ensuing rivalry between the Super Generation Army and Tsuruta-gun would produce all time tag team, and 6-man tag team classic matches.

However, he became better known for tag team wrestling. He won his first championship, the All Asia Tag Team Championship, with Shinichi Nakano on June 5, 1990. He won the World Tag Team Championship for the first time on March 4, 1992, teaming with Jumbo Tsuruta. He formed a tag team with Toshiaki Kawada, called The Holy Demon Army, a team which ended up holding the World Tag Team Championship 6 times. The team split when Taue left AJPW for Mitsuharu Misawa's new Pro Wrestling Noah promotion in August 2000, while Kawada decided to stay.

=== Pro Wrestling Noah (2000–2017) ===
In Noah Taue continued tag team wrestling, teaming mostly with Takuma Sano. On November 5, 2005, Taue was able to defeat Takeshi Rikio with his Ore ga Taue finisher to capture the GHC Heavyweight Championship, which he held into the new year before losing it to Jun Akiyama on January 22, 2006.

On June 27, 2009, following the June 13 death of Mitsuharu Misawa, Akira Taue was appointed as the new president of Pro Wrestling Noah. On May 12, 2013, Taue announced that he would be officially retiring from the ring in December. On December 7, 2013, Taue wrestled his retirement match, where he, Takeshi Morishima, Takashi Sugiura, and Genba Hirayanagi defeated Genichiro Tenryu, Tatsumi Fujinami, Masao Inoue, and Kentaro Shiga, with Taue pinning Inoue for the final win of his career.

Taue served as the Noah president until November 1, 2016, when the company was sold to IT development company Estbee, after which he was given the new role of an advisor. He would resign from his position in February 2017.

== Personal life ==
In June 2017, after studying with Mitsuhiro Matsunaga, Taue opened his own steakhouse in Tsukuba, Ibaraki, Japan, called Steak Izakaya Champ, where he personally cuts and cooks the steak, as well as greeting customers.

On August 22, 2018, Taue announced at a press conference that he was battling stomach cancer. The diagnosis came from when he was originally hospitalized from a fall at his home on March 2 that caused bleeding from the stomach, which required an emergency blood transfusion. He also revealed that on April 16, he underwent a gastrectomy after discovering the cancer during an examination.

== Championships and accomplishments ==
- All Japan Pro Wrestling
  - All Asia Tag Team Championship (1 time) – with Shinichi Nakano
  - Triple Crown Heavyweight Championship (1 time)
  - World Tag Team Championship (7 times) – with Jumbo Tsuruta (1) and Toshiaki Kawada (6)
  - Champion Carnival (1996)
  - World's Strongest Tag Determination League (1996, 1997) – with Toshiaki Kawada
  - January 2 Korakuen Hall Heavyweight Battle Royal (1992)
  - World Tag Team Championship Tournament (2000) – with Toshiaki Kawada
- Nikkan Sports
  - Fighting Spirit Award (2005)
- Pro Wrestling Illustrated
  - Ranked No. 33 of the top 500 singles wrestlers of the "PWI Years" in 1997
  - Ranked No. 115 of the top 500 singles wrestlers in the "PWI Years" in 2003
  - Ranked No. 8 of the 100 best tag team of the "PWI Years" with Toshiaki Kawada
- Pro Wrestling Noah
  - GHC Heavyweight Championship (1 time)
- Tokyo Sports
  - Fighting Spirit Award (1992, 1996)
  - Lifetime Achievement Award (2014)
  - Match of the Year (1995) – with Toshiaki Kawada vs. Mitsuharu Misawa and Kenta Kobashi on June 9, 1995
  - Tag Team of the Year (1997) – with Toshiaki Kawada
- Wrestling Observer Newsletter awards
  - Wrestling Observer Newsletter Hall of Fame (Class of 2022) with Toshiaki Kawada

== Sumo career record ==
Tamakirin Yasumasa
Year	January Hatsu basho, Tokyo	March Haru basho, Osaka	May Natsu basho, Tokyo	July Nagoya basho, Nagoya	September Aki basho, Tokyo	November Kyūshū basho, Fukuoka
1980	(Maezumo)	East Jonokuchi #14; Sat out due to injury 0–0–7	(Maezumo)	East Jonokuchi #30; 6–1	West Jonidan #87; 6–1	West Jonidan #22; 6–1
1981	East Sandanme #59; 6–1	West Sandanme #13; 2–5	East Sandanme #37; 4–3	West Sandanme #23; 3–4	East Sandanme #34; 3–4	West Sandanme #44; 5–2
1982	East Sandanme #21; 4–3	East Sandanme #10; 4–3	West Makushita #60; 4–3	East Makushita #48; 2–5	West Sandanme #13; 6–1	East Makushita #40; 3–4
1983	West Makushita #49; 2–5	East Sandanme #18; 3–4	West Sandanme #36; 6–1	West Makushita #53; 5–2	West Makushita #33; 5–2	East Makushita #19; 3–4
1984	West Makushita #27; 5–2	East Makushita #14; 3–4	East Makushita #21; 2–5	West Makushita #40; 4–3	East Makushita #29; 3–4	West Makushita #43; 4–3
1985	West Makushita #30; 6–1	East Makushita #11; 2–5	West Makushita #32; 5–2	East Makushita #19; 3–4	East Makushita #26; 5–2	West Makushita #14; 5–2
1986	West Makushita #6; 5–2	East Makushita #2; 5–2	West Jūryō #12; 7–8	East Makushita #1; 4–3	East Jūryō #13; 9–6	West Jūryō #9; 8–7
1987	West Jūryō #6; 6–9	East Jūryō #10; 7–8	East Jūryō #11; 7–8	West Jūryō #13; Retired; 0–0	x	x
Record given as wins–losses–absences Top division champion Top division runner-up Retired Lower divisions Non-participation Sanshō key: F=Fighting spirit; O=Outstanding performance; T=Technique Also shown: ★=Kinboshi; P=Playoff(s); Divisions: Makuuchi — Jūryō — Makushita — Sandanme — Jonidan — Jonokuchi Makuuchi ranks: Yokozuna — Ōzeki — Sekiwake — Komusubi — Maegashira
