= Takeshi Rikio =

Japanese wrestler

Rikiō Takeshi
Personal information
- Born: Takeshi Inoue; December 20, 1972 (age 53) Sakurai, Nara, Japan

Professional wrestling career
- Ring name: Takeshi Rikiõ
- Billed height: 1.91 m (6 ft 3 in)
- Billed weight: 125 kg (276 lb)
- Trained by: All Japan Pro Wrestling
- Debut: May 28, 2000
- Retired: November 27, 2011

Rikiō Takeshi (力皇 猛; born December 20, 1972 as Inoue Takeshi) is a Japanese retired professional wrestler, who worked for Pro Wrestling Noah. He is also a former sumo wrestler.

== Sumo career ==
He made his sumo debut in March 1988, after leaving junior high school. He joined at the same time as future yokozuna Takanohana and Wakanohana. He initially trained at the same stable as these two, Futagoyama-beya, but when former yokozuna Takanosato branched off to set up Naruto-beya in March 1989, Inoue was one of the young recruits to follow him to the new stable. He also changed his shikona, or fighting name, from Futagozakura to Rikio. In July 1993 he was promoted to the second highest jūryō division, becoming the first wrestler from Naruto stable to reach elite sekitori status. He was demoted from that division after just one tournament, but returned to jūryō in May 1994 and was promoted to the top makuuchi division in July 1996 after winning his second jūryō yūshō, or tournament championship. In September 1997 he was promoted to his highest rank of maegashira 4, but he did not take part in the tournament. This was initially said to be due to a liver disorder, but it was later revealed that relations with his stablemaster had broken down, and Rikio was forced to retire from sumo. Due to the dispute he was unable to have a formal retirement ceremony, but some of his friends in the sumo world organised an informal one for him in early 1998, with Akebono and Konishiki among the attendees.

== Professional wrestling career ==
After leaving sumo he was soon scouted by All Japan Pro Wrestling. After training in their dojo, he made his debut in 2000 in a tag team match in which he partnered Masao Inoue against Takeshi Morishima and Jun Akiyama. However, before he could build any momentum, Mitsuharu Misawa left AJPW and in the process, took most of the native talent with Rikio being among these talents. In Pro Wrestling Noah, he has seen much success. He dethroned the legendary Kenta Kobashi for the GHC Heavyweight Championship (at the end of this match Rikio can be seen sobbing as he accepts the title from Kobashi), ending his two-year reign, before losing the title to Akira Taue some time later. On June 4, 2006, he captured his second GHC Tag Team Championship with Jun Akiyama when he pinned Muhammad Yone after a Musou. However, Rikio and Akiyama were forced to vacate their title on September 25, 2006 after Rikio suffered a neck injury.

On November 27, 2011, Rikio announced his retirement from professional wrestling due to serious neck injuries.

== Championships and accomplishments ==
- Nikkan Sports
  - Outstanding Performance Award (2005)
- Pro Wrestling Illustrated
  - PWI ranked him #82 of the top 500 singles wrestlers in the PWI 500 in 2010
- Pro Wrestling Noah
  - GHC Heavyweight Championship (1 time)
  - GHC Tag Team Championship (3 times) – with Takeshi Morishima (1), Jun Akiyama (1) and Muhammad Yone (1)
  - Two Day Tag Team Tournament (2004) – with Naomichi Marufuji
  - Global Tag League Outstanding Performance Prize (2008) – with Jun Akiyama
- Tokyo Sports
  - Outstanding Performance Award (2005)
  - Rookie of the Year (2000)

== Sumo career record ==
Rikiō Takeshi
Year	January Hatsu basho, Tokyo	March Haru basho, Osaka	May Natsu basho, Tokyo	July Nagoya basho, Nagoya	September Aki basho, Tokyo	November Kyūshū basho, Fukuoka
1988	x	(Maezumō)	West Jonokuchi #17; 4–3	East Jonidan #127; 4–3	East Jonidan #93; 3–4	East Jonidan #114; 7–0–P
1989	East Sandanme #101; 3–4	West Jonidan #17; 4–3	West Sandanme #93; 4–3	East Sandanme #71; 4–3	West Sandanme #52; 3–4	East Sandanme #67; 1–1–5
1990	West Jonidan #8; 3–4	East Jonidan #34; 5–2	West Sandanme #97; 6–1	East Sandanme #42; 3–4	East Sandanme #61; 3–4	West Sandanme #76; 6–1
1991	East Sandanme #25; 2–5	East Sandanme #50; 5–2	West Sandanme #21; 5–2	West Makushita #56; 4–3	East Makushita #43; 6–1	East Makushita #19; 3–4
1992	East Makushita #26; 3–4	West Makushita #34; 6–1	East Makushita #14; 4–3	West Makushita #8; 5–2	West Makushita #2; 3–4	East Makushita #7; 4–3
1993	East Makushita #4; 3–4	East Makushita #7; 4–3	West Makushita #3; 5–2	East Jūryō #12; 6–9	East Makushita #2; 3–4	West Makushita #5; 3–4
1994	East Makushita #9; 4–3	East Makushita #5; 4–3	West Jūryō #13; 8–7	East Jūryō #12; 8–7	East Jūryō #9; 7–8	East Jūryō #11; 9–6
1995	East Jūryō #8; 8–7	East Jūryō #7; 9–6	East Jūryō #4; 10–5	West Jūryō #2; 5–10	East Jūryō #7; 9–6	West Jūryō #2; 4–11
1996	East Jūryō #9; 10–5–P; Champion	West Jūryō #4; 9–6	West Jūryō #3; 12–3; Champion	West Maegashira #14; 9–6	West Maegashira #9; 6–9	East Maegashira #15; 8–7
1997	West Maegashira #13; 8–7	East Maegashira #12; 6–9	West Maegashira #15; 8–7	East Maegashira #12; 9–6	West Maegashira #4; Retired; 0–0–15	x
Record given as wins–losses–absences Top division champion Top division runner-up Retired Non-participation Jūryō Lower divisions Sanshō key: F=Fighting spirit; O=Outstanding performance; T=Technique Also shown: ★=Kinboshi; P=Playoff(s); Divisions: Makuuchi — Jūryō — Makushita — Sandanme — Jonidan — Jonokuchi Makuuchi ranks: Yokozuna — Ōzeki — Sekiwake — Komusubi — Maegashira

== See also ==
- List of sumo tournament second division champions
- Glossary of sumo terms
- List of past sumo wrestlers
