= Professional wrestling strikes =

Strikes can be offensive moves in professional wrestling, that can sometimes be used to set up an opponent for a hold or for a throw. There are a wide variety of strikes in pro wrestling, and many are known by several different names. Professional wrestlers frequently give their finishers new names. Occasionally, these names become popular and are used regardless of the wrestler performing the technique.

Professional wrestling contains a variety of punches and kicks found in martial arts and other fighting sports; the moves listed below are more specific to wrestling itself. Many of the moves below can also be performed from a raised platform (the top rope, the ring apron, etc.); these are called aerial variations. Moves are listed under general categories whenever possible.

== Body press ==
A maneuver that involves a wrestler attacking with the core of the body. It is executed from an upright, running position using momentum and weight to run over the opponent.

=== Body avalanche ===
The wrestler takes a short charge into an opponent in the corner of the ring without leaving the feet as they open both arms just before reaching the opponent, resulting in hitting with the chest and abdominal area while throwing both arms inward as in a bearhug, crushing the opponent into the turnbuckle. This is normally used by bigger, heavier wrestlers.

==== Stinger splash ====
A variation innovated by, popularized by, and named after Sting. It involves the wrestler trapping the opponent in a corner. Then the wrestler charges at the opponent, usually from the opposite corner, launching themselves and sandwiching the opponent between them and the turnbuckle while grabbing hold of the top rope.

=== Thesz press ===
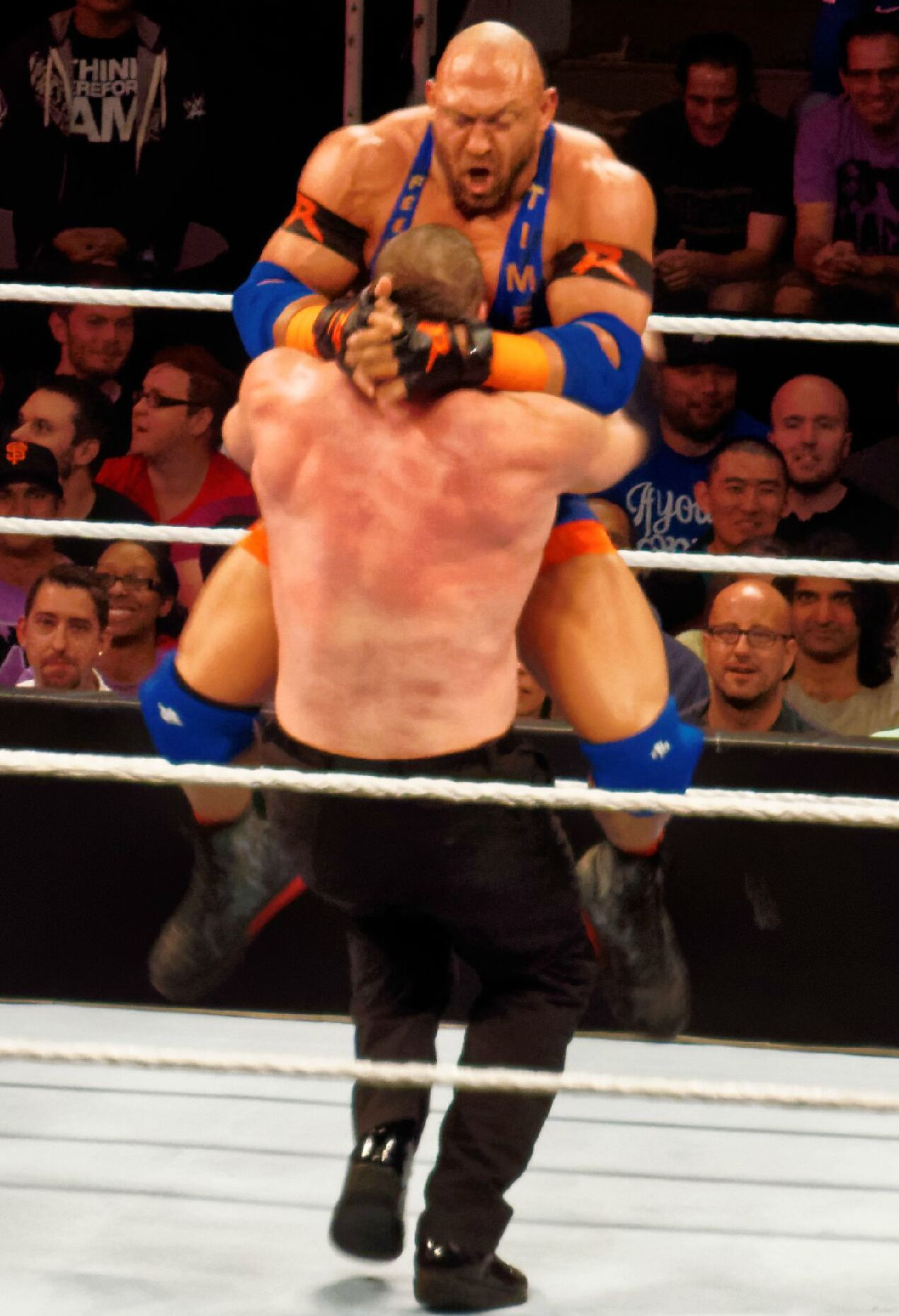
Ryback performing a Thesz Press on Kane

This move, originally called a flying body scissors, was innovated by, popularized and subsequently named after Lou Thesz, sees the attacking wrestler jumping toward a standing opponent, knocking them over their back, sitting on their waist and pinning them in a body scissors. It was initially developed by Thesz as a legitimate move and has since been seen in modern submission grappling contests. A variation, popularized by Stone Cold Steve Austin, is done in reverse; the attacking wrestler performs the Thesz press on a charging wrestler from a standing position, then instead of pinning them, they attack them with mounted punches.

=== Vertical press ===
Also known as vertical splash body press, this variation is made by a charging wrestler (usually standing on the second or top rope) against a standing opponent, landing on their chest and shoulders while remaining upright. The wrestler employs the momentum to bring their opponent down to the mat into a seated senton.

== Chop ==
A chop is a strike to the opponent's neck, shoulders or chest with the edge of a hand.

=== Backhand chop ===
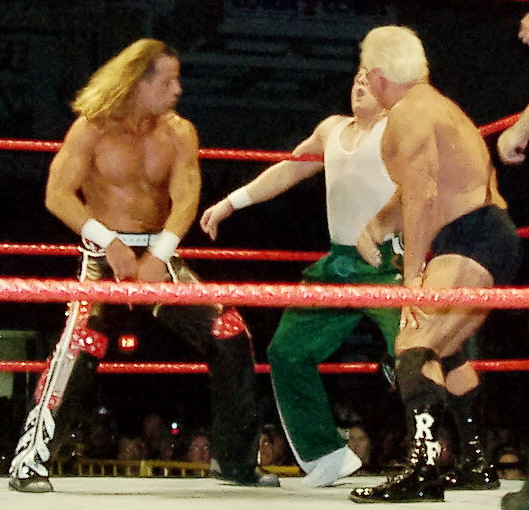
Shawn Michaels and Ric Flair delivering knife edge chops to Mike "Mikey" Mondo

Also known as a knife edge chop, back-hand slice or gyaku suihei chop (English: Reverse horizontal chop) (逆水平チョップ, Gyaku suihei choppu), is the act of a wrestler slice-chopping the chest of the opponent using an upward backhand swing. Many wrestlers, especially brawlers and Japanese wrestlers, use this maneuver, and some crowds (especially American wrestling crowds) respond with a "Woooo!" noise in honor of Ric Flair, who popularized the move. Other notable users of the move include Kenta Kobashi, Genichiro Tenryu, Gunther, Toshiaki Kawada, Hardcore Holly and many others. Kobashi also created the Machine Gun variant of the move, in which he delivers a series of rapid-fire chops to the chest of a standing opponent trapped in the corner.

==== Cross chop ====
A double variation of the aforementioned chop, the wrestler lunges forward or jumps forward in a pressing fashion while crossing arms forming an "X", hitting both sides of the opponent's neck.

==== Spinning knife edge chop ====
This variation sets the wrestler spinning 180 or full 360° striking the opponent's chest with a backhand chop. This version was originally named the "Rolling Kesageri Chop" and was invented by Kenta Kobashi.

=== Kesageri chop ===
A downward diagonal attack to the side of the opponent's neck or shoulder. The words kesa and geri in Japanese mean "monk's sash" and "cut" respectively, and it is based on a legitimate defensive cut in traditional Japanese swordsmanship. This move is notably used by Kenta Kobashi.

==== Mongolian chop ====
The act of chopping both the opponent's shoulders or sides of the neck in a downward swinging motion at the same time. The move has been most famously used by Japanese wrestlers such as Hiroyoshi Tenzan, Makoto Hashi and Jun Izumida, however CM Punk has also popularized the move in America.

=== Overhead chop ===
The wrestler draws a hand back and hits the opponent vertically, atop the head. This move is primarily used by very tall wrestlers such as The Great Khali, Giant Baba and Andre the Giant. It is also known as the tomahawk chop when used as part of a Native American gimmick, ostensibly due to it resembling a tomahawking motion. It was used as a finisher by Wahoo McDaniel, Chief Jay Strongbow and Tatanka, neither of whom were particularly tall.

=== Throat thrust ===
Also known as throat strike or sword stab. Similar to a conventional wrestling uppercut, the wrestler strikes the opponent's throat upward with the tips of all five stiffed fingers of a supine hand. Abdullah the Butcher and Sgt. Slaughter were professional wrestlers known for its use as signature move.

=== Thumb to the throat ===
A simple maneuver derived from the thumb chokehold having a wrestler drawing back a hand and striking the windpipe with only the thumb, sometimes while holding the opponent by the nape. Performed by wrestlers like Ernie Ladd. Others include Umaga who dubbed the move the Samoan Spike; the move would later be used by his nephew Solo Sikoa. Bad Luck Fale uses a variation, what is preceded by a choke-lift, called Grenade Terry Gordy used this as a move alongside the Thumb choke hold which he dubbed the Oriental Spike. Dabba-Kato also used this move during his WWE main roster tenure as Commander Azeez called the Nigerian Nail.

== Clothesline ==
Tyson Dux (left) delivering a clothesline to Pepper Parks.

A move in which one wrestler runs toward another extending their arm out from the side of the body and parallel to the ground, hitting the opponent in the neck or chest, knocking them over. This move is often confused with a lariat.

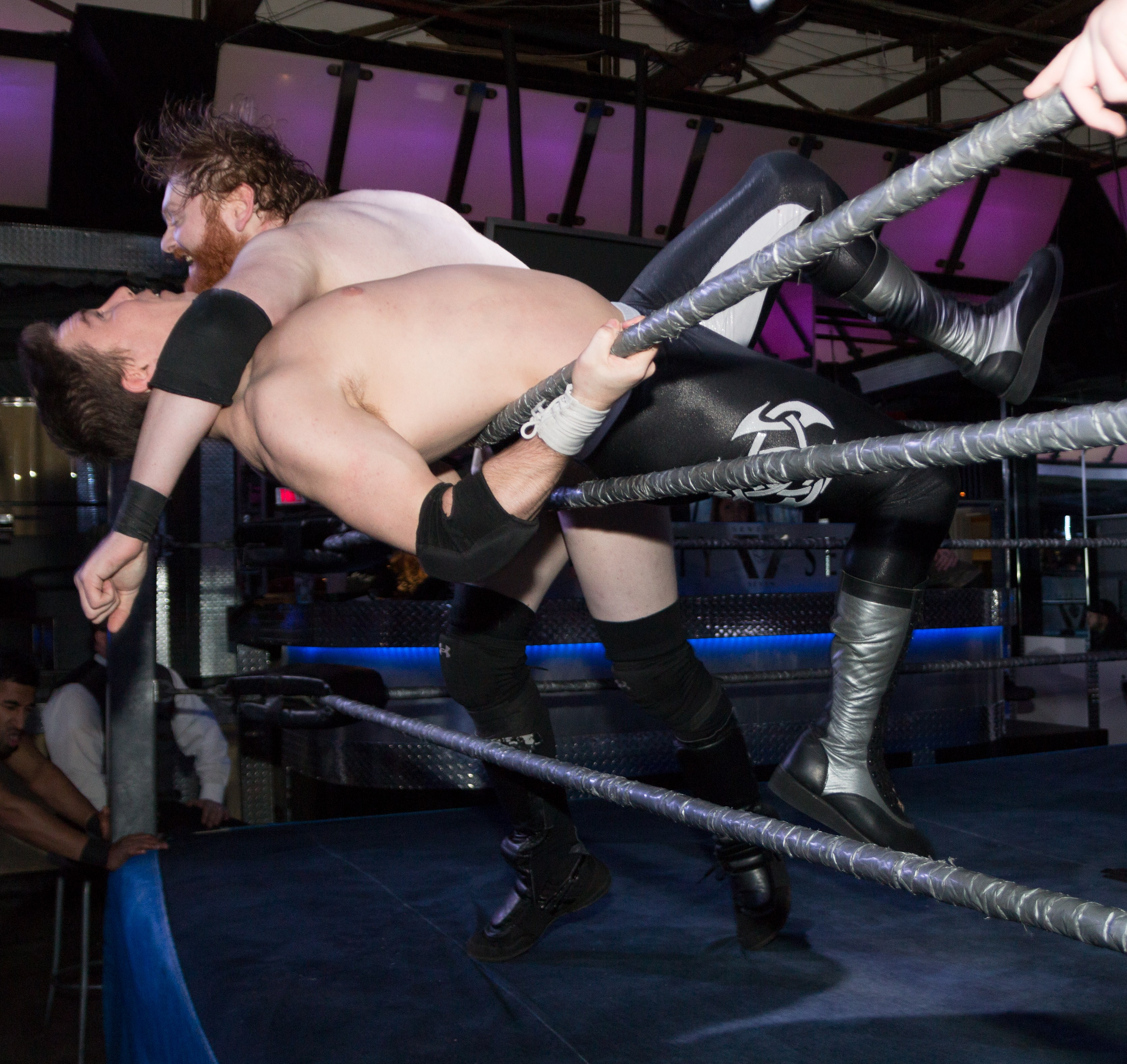
Josh Rogen clotheslines Eric Cairnie over the top rope and out of the ring.

=== Cactus clothesline ===
Popularized by Mick Foley and named after his "Cactus Jack" gimmick. The attacking wrestler charges at an opponent against the ring ropes and clotheslines them, the charge's force and momentum knocks both the wrestler and the opponent over the top rope outside the ring.

=== Corner clothesline ===
An attack used by a wrestler where instead of knocking down a standing opponent, aims to squash them against the turnbuckle.

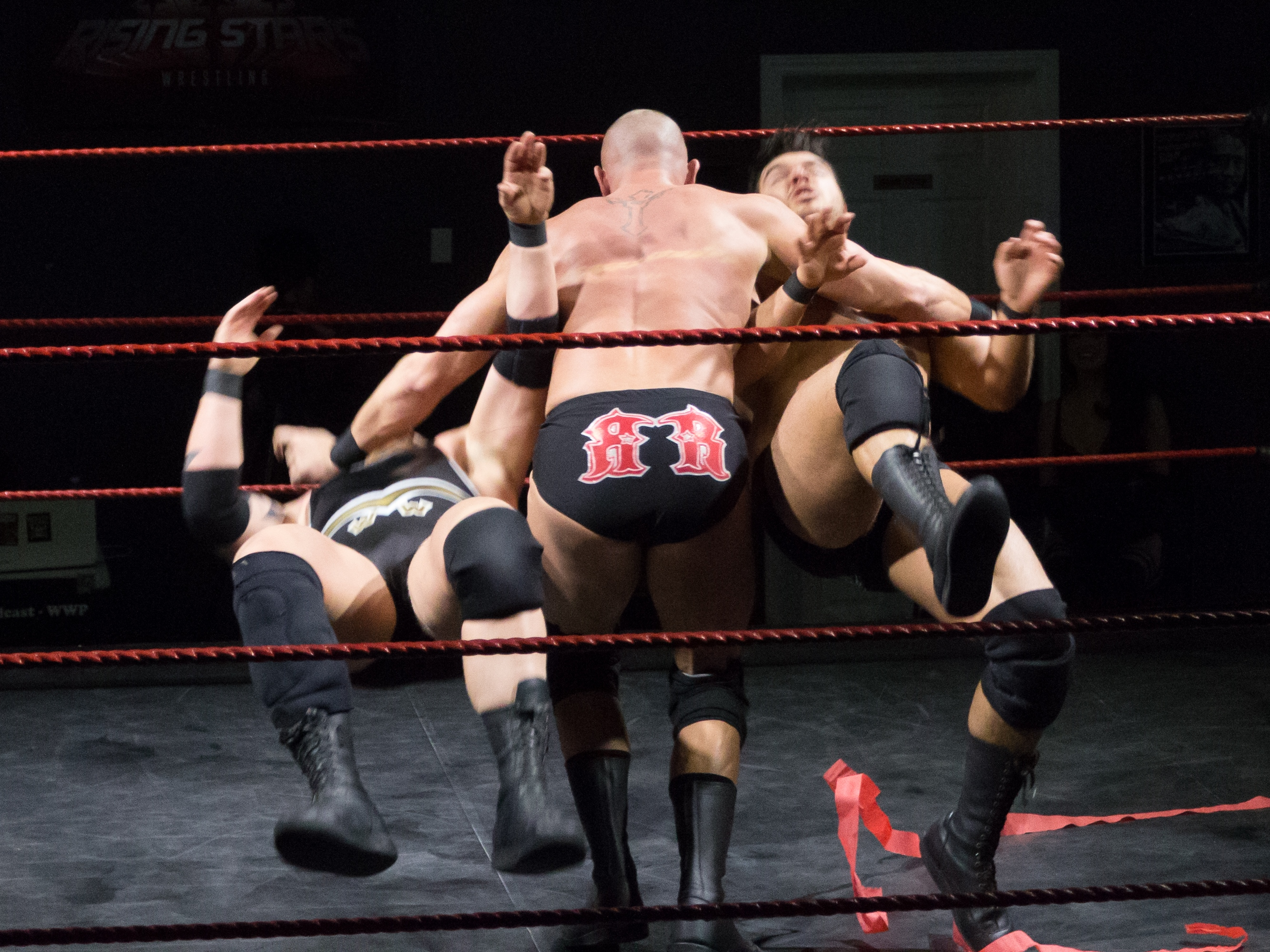
Randy Reigns delivering a double-rebound clothesline to Josh Alexander (left) and Ethan Page

=== Double clothesline ===
Any variant where instead of aiming at just one opponent, the attacking wrestler knocks down two opponents at once.

=== Leaping clothesline ===
Also known as a jumping clothesline or a flying clothesline, this move involves the attacking wrestler running toward an opponent, then leaping into the air before connecting with a clothesline. This variant's use is commonly associated with The Undertaker, The Rock, and Roman Reigns. Another version sees an attacking wrestler leap up into the air and connecting with a clothesline onto an opponent leaning against the corner turnbuckle.

The Rock also used a lesser variant of this move which saw him jump into the air at the exact moment the clothesline connected.

=== Rebound clothesline ===
As the opponent runs to the ropes on one side of the ring and rebounds against them, the attacker also runs to the same ropes and rebounds ensuring to be behind them and performs the clothesline as the opponent turns to face them.

=== Short-arm clothesline ===
This snapping variation is set up by a short-arm, then the wrestler pulls the opponent back and clotheslines them with the free arm.

=== Three-point stance clothesline ===
In this attack a wrestler uses a three-point stance, then runs and clotheslines the opponent. Famously used by performers with known football background, such as "Hacksaw" Jim Duggan or "Mongo" McMichael.

== Double axe handle ==
Also known as a double sledge or polish hammer after its most noted user, Ivan Putski. It sets an attacking wrestler clutching both hands together, swinging them downward hitting usually the opponent's back, face, or top of the head. The many names of this move come from the attack mimicking the motion seen when people swing a sledgehammer or axe. There is also a top rope variation.

=== Discus double axe handle ===
The Wrestler performs a discus before clutching the hands together and delivering the double axe handle. It was used by Manabu Nakanishi as Yaijin Hammer.

== Drops ==
Attacks in which an attacking wrestler jumps and falls down onto an opponent on the floor, striking with a specific part of the body.

=== Chop drop ===
The wrestler either falls forward, or jumps up and drops down, hitting a lying opponent with a kesageri chop on the way down, usually landing in a kneeling position. Scotty 2 Hotty is best known for performing the chop drop which is always preceded by a routine that involves him hopping on one leg four times (as the crowd chants W-O-R-M), doing worm dance moves toward the opponent and swinging his arms just before hitting the chop drop, while his opponent lies face up and motionless on the mat.

=== Elbow drop ===
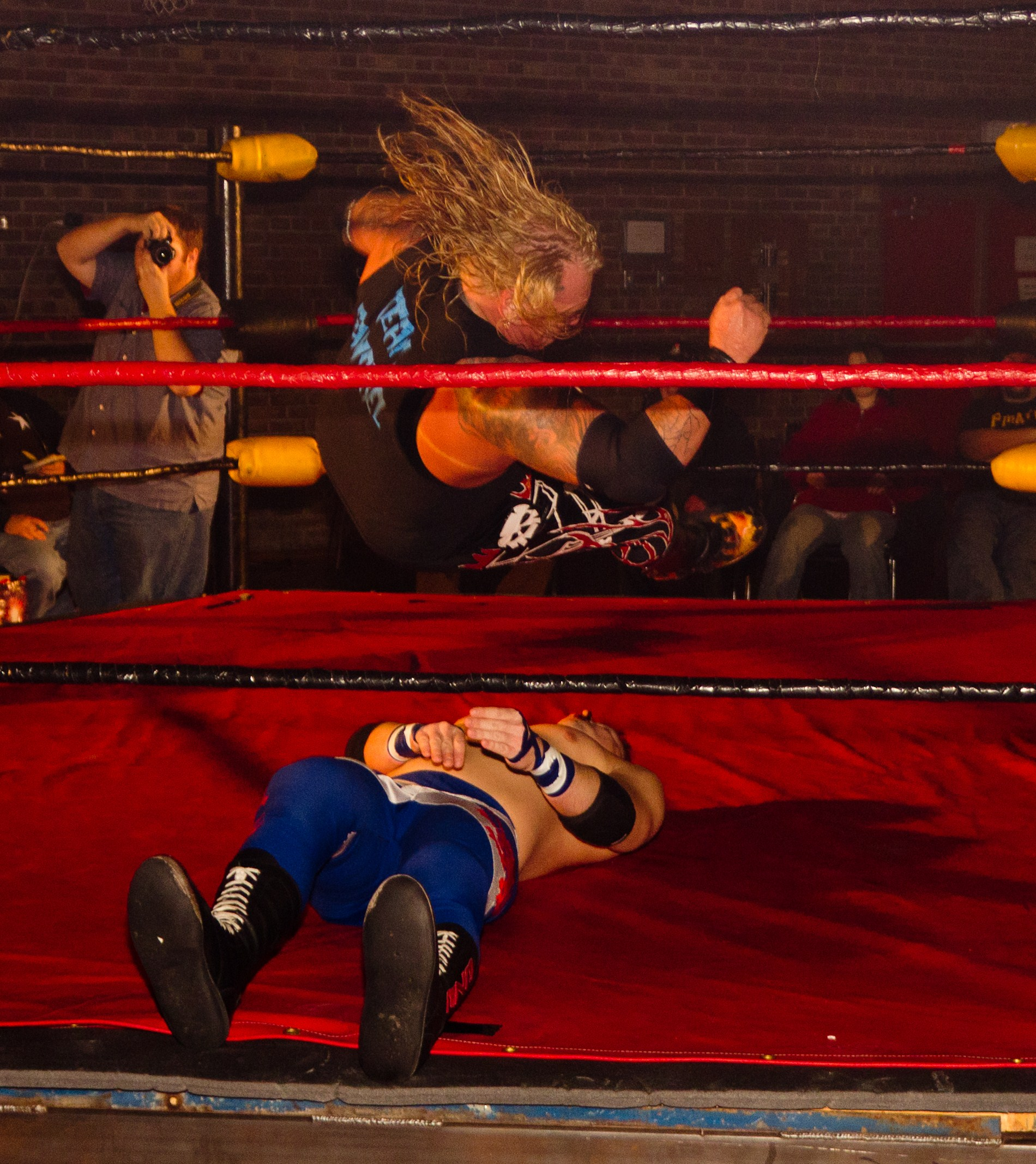
Gangrel performing an elbow drop onto his opponent

A move in which a wrestler jumps or falls down on an opponent driving their elbow into anywhere on the opponent's body. A common elbow drop sees a wrestler raise one elbow before falling to one side and striking it across an opponent. The Rock popularized the high impact elbow drop and called it The People's Elbow.

Another common elbow drop is the pointed elbow drop, that sees a wrestler raise both elbows up and drop directly forward dropping one, or both elbows onto the opponent.

==== Corkscrew elbow drop ====
This variation sees the wrestler raise one elbow before falling and simultaneously twisting around as falls to one side, striking the opponent with the elbow anywhere on the body. Sometimes, the wrestler will swing one leg around before the fall, gaining momentum for the corkscrew twist, first invented by "Nature Boy" Buddy Landel in 1984.

==== Spinning headlock elbow drop ====
This is any elbow drop which is performed after applying a headlock, the most widely known variation is the inverted facelock elbow drop, in which a wrestler puts the opponent into an inverted facelock, and then turns 180°, dropping the elbow across the opponent's chest, driving them down to the mat. This was used by The Hurricane as the Eye of The Hurricane.

Another variation of this move sees the executor use the whole arm as a lariat instead of just the elbow, a side headlock from a jumping position variant can also be executed and twisted around into a sitout lariat. An inverted variation of this move sees the wrestler applying a front facelock before executing an elbow or a lariat to the back of the opponent's head causing them to land on the mat or into a facebreaker where the wrestler places their knee in front of the opponent whilst when executing the move.

=== Fist drop ===
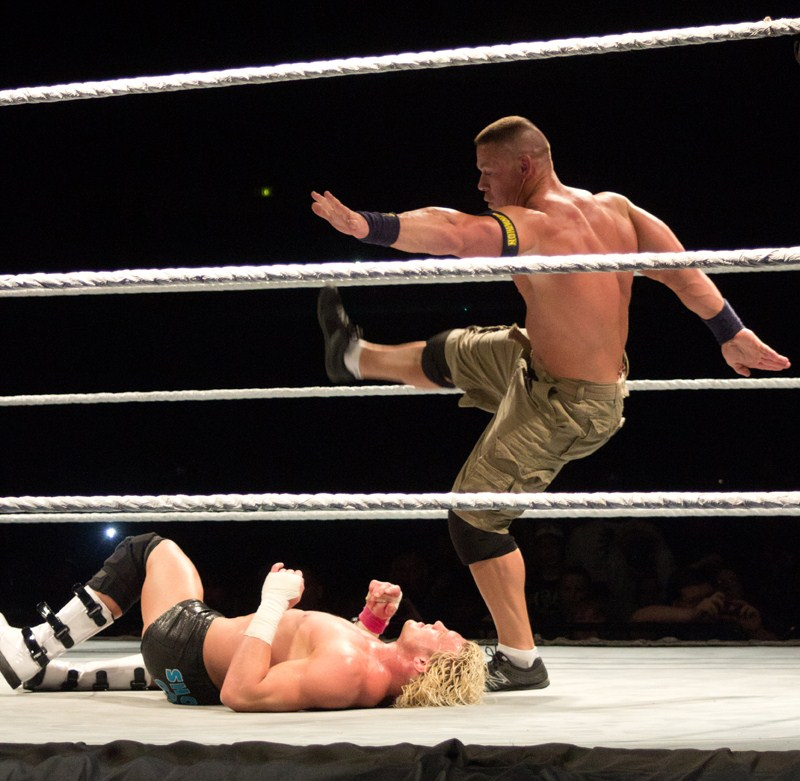
John Cena's Five Knuckle Shuffle (fist drop) on Dolph Ziggler

A wrestler performs a series of theatrics before jumping or falling down, driving a fist usually to the opponent's forehead. Utilized by wrestlers including Jerry Lawler, Ted DiBiase, The Honky Tonk Man and John Cena, the latter of whom calls it the Five Knuckle Shuffle.

There is a snapping variation called karate fist drop that can be performed in a series, setting the wrestler besides a fallen opponent in a front stance known as Zenkutsu dachi. Then the wrestler drops to their rear leg's knee delivering the fist at the opponent's stomach, to rise up back again.

=== Forearm drop ===
A move similar to a sliding forearm smash in which a wrestler jumps down on an opponent driving their forearm into anywhere on the opponent's body. Used by Ilja Dragunov as the H-Bomb.

=== Headbutt drop ===
A move setting an attacking wrestler jumping or falling down on an opponent, driving their head usually at the opponent's face or midsection. The most common variation sets the attacking wrestler standing at the fallen opponent's feet, taking them by the ankles to spread their legs. Then the attacker releases the grip as they jump or fall down, delivering the forehead to the opponent's groin. Jun Izumida, Santino Marella and Maki Itoh have most famously used this move as a signature move.

=== Knee drop ===
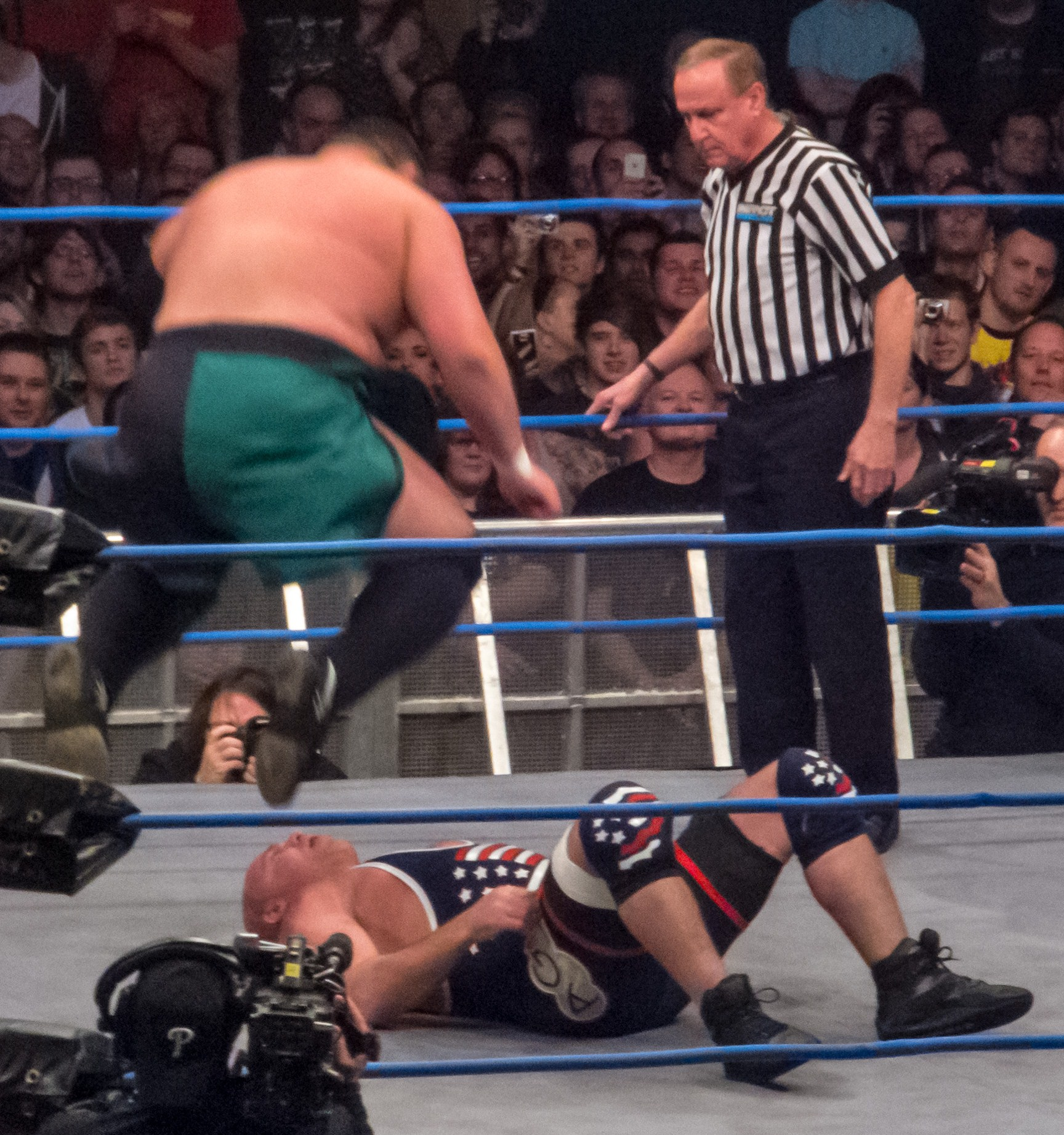
Samoa Joe delivering a knee drop to Kurt Angle.

A move in which a wrestler jumps/falls down on an opponent, driving their knee into anywhere on the opponent's body. It is often sold as more powerful if the wrestler bounces off the ropes first. Ric Flair, Randy Orton and Samoa Joe are examples of wrestlers who use this move. A variation sets the wrestler kneeling besides a fallen opponent, then performing a handstand to drive their knee to the opponent's midsection. Bruiser Brody famously used this move as one of his finishers.

=== Leg drop ===
A whole number of attacks in which a wrestler will jump/fall and land the back of their leg across an opponent's chest, throat, or face. The running variation is used by Hulk Hogan as his finisher. Nia Jax also uses the running variation as one of her signature moves.

== Elbow ==
An elbow attack sees the wrestler using front or back elbow to connect it in any part of the opponent's body.

=== Back elbow ===
Also known as reverse elbow, sees the wrestler giving the back with to a standing or running opponent, and then striking with the back of the elbow to the opponent's face, neck or chest.

==== Corner back elbow ====
The wrestler strikes a back elbow to a cornered opponent, usually while running.

==== Spinning back elbow ====
The wrestler faces away from the opponent, spins around to face away from the opponent and strikes the opponent's face with a back elbow. This variation was popularized by Chris Jericho who called it the Judas Effect.

==== Swinging back elbow ====
The wrestler faces toward the opponent, and strikes the front or back of the head with a full swinging back elbow. The move can be performed on an opponent who is kneeling and facing away. This is commonly used by Will Ospreay as a finisher, which he names the Hidden Blade, which usually sees him charge towards a seated, kneeling, or rising opponent.

=== Bionic elbow ===
Colt Cabana strikes Michael Elgin with a bionic elbow.

This move is a strike that is brought from a high position and travels vertically toward the floor, dropping the point of the elbow directly on the target. Often this will set an attacking wrestler bending an opponent over to deliver the elbow at the back of the opponent. This type of "12-6 elbow" is illegal in the Unified Rules of Mixed Martial Arts. This move was made famous by WWE Legend and Hall of Famer "The American Dream" Dusty Rhodes.

==== Mounted elbow drop ====
The wrestler approaches to a cornered opponent and climbs the second or top rope beside the opponent with a leg on each side. The wrestler then jumps down off the ropes, delivering a bionic elbow to the opponent's head, neck (if the opponent's neck is bent-down or sideways) or the shoulder.

=== Elbow smash ===
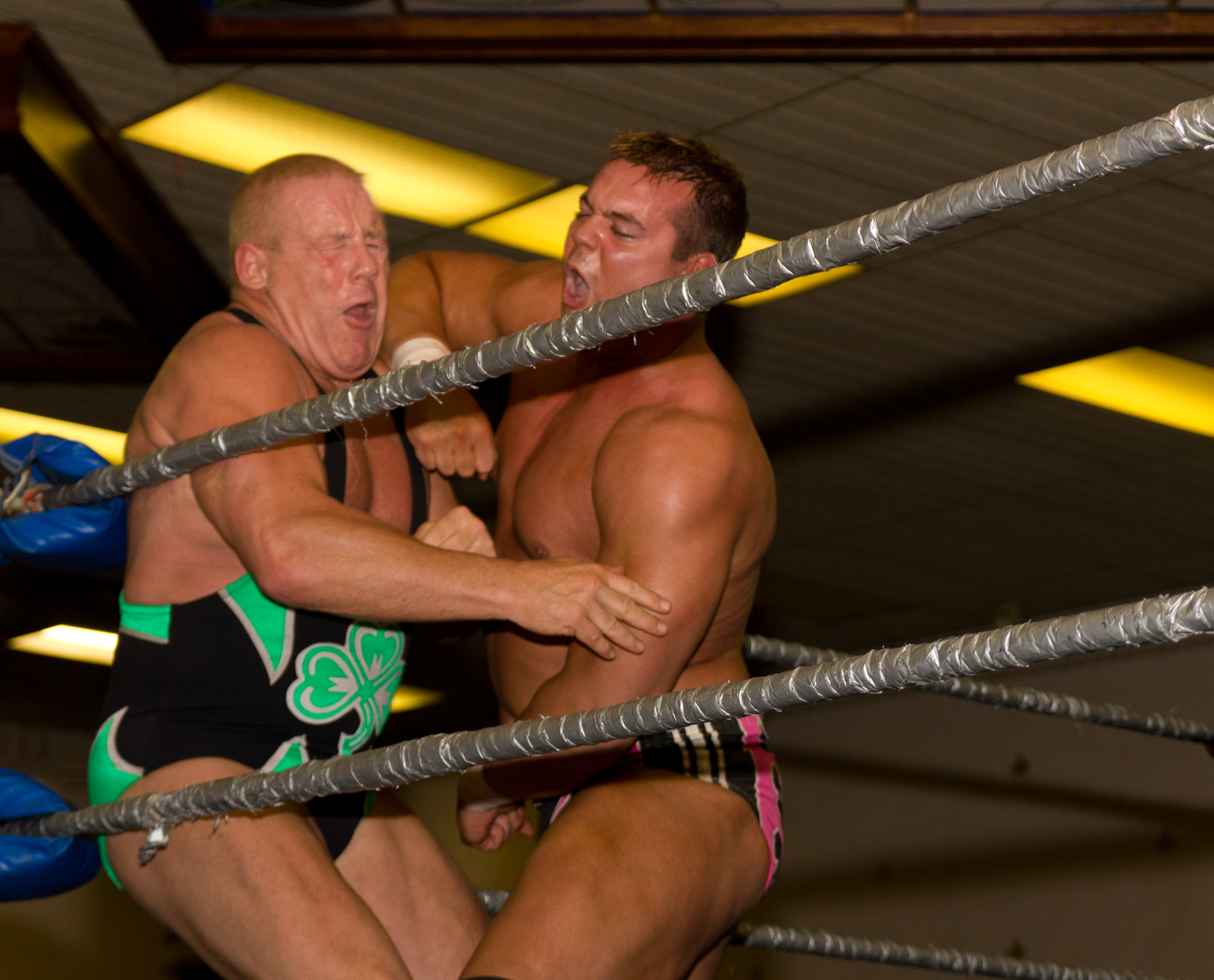
Harry Smith strikes Fit Finlay with an elbow smash.

The wrestler makes a punching motion, but tucks their hand toward the chest so the elbow and forearm make contact. These can be used in place of punches, for striking with a clenched fist is illegal in most wrestling matches. A high impact version is used by Wade Barrett as his finishing move known as the Bull Hammer, also used by Karrion Kross known as the Kross Hammer. However the move has been most famously used by Mitsuharu Misawa, who won his first ever Triple Crown Heavyweight Championship with the move.

==== Rolling elbow ====
In this move, invented by Mitsuharu Misawa, the wrestler facing away from the opponent, spins 180° from the stood direction striking with an elbow. Another variation sees the wrestler first facing the opponent, spinning a full 360° to face the opponent again while hitting them.

==== Crucifix elbows ====
In this move, the wrestler puts their opponent into a Crucifix hold and repeats elbow smashes to the head and neck. This was invented by Bryan Danielson and used by Jay White.

==== Short-arm elbow smash ====
This variation is set up by a wrestler performing an Irish whip but keeping the opponent's wrist held, then the wrestler pulls the opponent back and hits using the other arm's elbow.

=== Side elbow ===
Having the opponent behind the wrestler, the later takes a sidestep and thrusts an elbow into the opponent's ribcage. This is more often seen as a defensive maneuver and is the most common counter for a sleeper hold.

== Facewash ==
Shinjiro Otani performing a facewash on Yoshihiro Tajiri during a Hustle show.

A maneuver aiming to hurt and/or humiliate an opponent, usually having them sitting or leaning the back of the head against the bottom corner turnbuckle, while the attacking wrestler repeatedly rubs their boot's sole across their face. Once the maneuver is finished, the attacking wrestler can execute either a running kick, knee, drop or many other strikes that first sees them running toward or rebounding off the opposing ropes and charging at the fallen opponent. The moves most famous user is Shinjiro Otani who, throughout the entirety of his career, has used the move to theatrical affect. The move is also used by Samoa Joe and Matt Cardona, the latter of whom calls the move the Reboot (formerly known as the Broski Boot during his WWE tenure as Zack Ryder).

=== Boot lace eye-rake ===
A variation that sees the attacking wrestler placing their shin or instep over the opponent's face, and either pushing the opponent's head or their own leg down, raking the opponent's eyes across the laces of their boot.

=== Double boot scrape ===
With the opponent lying back on the mat, the wrestler stands at the opponent's top of the head and leaps to rake both points of the boots over the opponent's face, while falling back on their feet.

=== Spinning boot scrape ===
In the same sense, and as performed by Eddie Guerrero, this move sees a wrestler putting one foot over the face of an opponent lying on the mat. While stepping, they spin around the point of their foot, rubbing the fallen opponent's face.

=== Stink Face ===
This move sees a wrestler sitting while rubbing/smothering their (often exposed) buttocks in the face of an opponent lying in the corner of the ring, humiliating the opponent. This move is not meant to cause injury, though breathing difficulties will arise if applied on the opponent too long. 10-15 seconds is the average. The move was first popularized by Rikishi and was adopted by multiple wrestlers, most notably Big Show and Nia Jax.

== Forearm ==
In the same sense of an elbow or a knee, the attacking wrestler strikes the opponent using one or both forearms.

=== European uppercut ===
A forearm thrown in an uppercutting fashion, often the wrestler does a quick grapple first to bring the spare arm up inside, hitting the opponent under the chin. Popularized by Claudio Castagnoli, it is known as the forearm uppercut in British wrestling and the manchette in French wrestling.

=== Forearm chops ===
The wrestler clenches both fists and rises both arms, striking the sides of a cornered opponent's head in a stabbing motion one forearm at a time. Popularized by Big Van Vader as the Vader Hammer.

=== Forearm club ===
An attacking wrestler uses one hand to take hold of an opponent by the nape or hair and leans them forward while extending the other arm in a raised position, clenching the fist before throwing the forearm forward down onto the opponent, clubbing the opponent across the back of the head/neck. This will often send the opponent to the mat front-first.

Sheamus' Beats of the Bodhrán (inverted forearm clubs) to Wade Barrett.

==== Inverted forearm club ====
A variation that sees the attacking wrestler take hold of an opponent and lean them backward to expose the chest, allowing the attacking wrestler to club the opponent and send them to the mat back-first. Another variation sets the opponent into an inverted facelock by the attacking wrestler as they repeatedly club the opponent's chest with their forearm. Popularized by Sheamus and The Brawling Brutes, who call it the Beats of the Bodhrán.

=== Forearm smash ===
An attacking wrestler tucks an arm in, then hits the opponent in the head or ribcage upward and/or sideways with a forearm to force them back and down to the mat. The attacker may sometimes grab and hold the opponent back the back of their head or neck to keep them in place before delivering the strike. The attacker may also throw additional strikes while maintaining their hold on the opponent.

==== Flying forearm smash ====
While running toward an opponent (usually after bouncing off the ropes), an attacking wrestler would leap up into the air, before connecting the forearm smash with their arm held at 90 degrees towards the opponent while remaining standing, falling chest first, or dropping into a kneeling/seated position after striking the opponent. Tito Santana used this move as a finisher as did Lex Luger who used the version that saw him using the inside flat portion of the forearm, held at a 90 degree angle, while falling to his knees or chest first. Shawn Michaels who uses this move as a signature which sees him use the falling version rolling onto his back after hitting the move to then perform a kip-up to sometimes set up for his Sweet Chin Music.

Some attackers would perform a springboard propelling themselves airborne to hit the standing opponent with the forearm. This version was popularized by A.J. Styles called Phenomenal Forearm as a finisher while Will Ospreay uses it as Pip Pip Cheerio as a signature.

==== Running Forearm smash ====
A wrestler charges rising an arm at a 45 degree angle, driving the bottom portion of the forearm to the opponent's head or shoulder in a swinging motion, usually falling as the strike connects face first to the canvas. Often used as a finisher by strong, muscular wrestlers as its innovator Larry Henning, and Randy Orton. Lex Luger (who also used the flying version above) used a variation of this move finisher which saw him striking the opponent using the flat inside portion with his forearm, held at a 90 degree angle, in a visual fashion similar to that of a crooked arm lariat.

==== Sliding forearm smash ====
While running toward an opponent (usually after bouncing off the ropes), the attacking wrestler extends the forearm forward and does a slide across the mat before connecting.

=== Pistol whipping ===
A lesser used version that sees the wrestler standing over a crawling opponent on all fours, delivering the forearm inward and sideways onto the opponent's temple repeatedly in a swinging motion. This move is named after the way some police officers used to submit a suspect to torture or in cases involving forced confession. Kurt Angle used to perform this maneuver as a means to set an opponent up for a submission hold.

== Headbutt ==
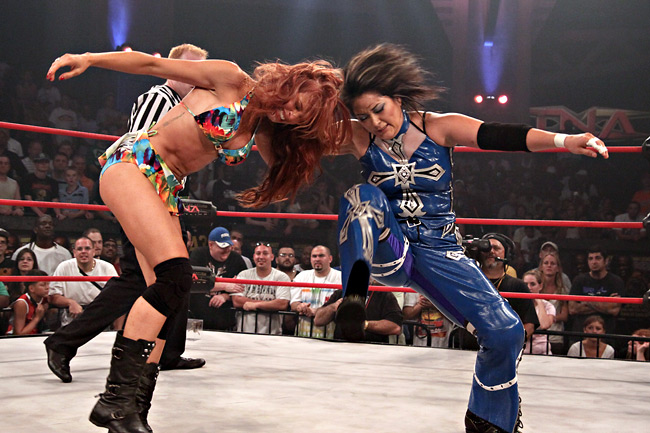
Ayako Hamada delivering a headbutt to Christy Hemme

An attack where a wrestler uses the head to strike a part of the opponent's body, usually the forehead or chin (unlike a legitimate headbutt), to daze the target, counting on the superior hardness of the wrestler's head and the momentum delivered to hurt the opponent without hurting the wrestler. Many wrestlers deliver a headbutt to an opponent's head by holding the opponent's head and delivering the headbutt to their own intervening hand instead, relying on it to cushion the blow.

=== Battering ram ===
The wrestler stands facing an upright opponent, lowers the head and then jumps or charges forward, driving the top of the head into the abdomen of the opponent. There is also a double-team version of the move.

==== Reverse battering ram ====
The attacking wrestler performs an Irish whip to the opponent and runs to bounce against the ropes front or side first at the other side of the ring, then jumps and turns mid-air to deliver a headbutt against the opponent's head. A popular move in Mexican wrestling, often associated with Rayo de Jalisco Jr. There is another variation where after bouncing, the attacker jumps arching the back, plunging the top of the head into the opponent's chest. A simple running version of this move in which the attacker charges toward the opponent is being used by Ilja Dragunov as a finisher calling it the Torpedo Moscow.

=== Crawling headbutts ===
Having the opponent rising up after lying in the mat, the wrestler crawls on all fours, bashing their head against the opponent's forehead, shoulder, or mid-section (often repeatedly). Also known as doggie headbutts, for they were popularized by Junkyard Dog.

=== Trapping headbutts ===
The wrestler holds both the opponent's arms under their own and delivers a series of headbutts to the opponent, who is unable to counter.

== Knee strike ==
An attack where a wrestler strikes an opponent using the knee. Using knees as offensive weapons is popular throughout British wrestling.

=== Bomaye ===
An attack where the wrestler stands behind or in front of the opponent and smashes their knee into the opponent's back or head. It is also referred to as the Running Knee Smash. It was used by Shinsuke Nakamura as the Bomaye and Kinshasa. Kota Ibushi uses the Bomaye as a tribute to Nakamura. This move is also used by Mason Madden, who calls the move Nico Nico Knee.

=== Double knee ===
An attack where a charging wrestler jumps, striking both knees simultaneously into the head, chest, or back of the opponent. Harashima uses it as a finishing maneuver called Somato.

=== Go 2 Sleep ===
Sometimes abbreviated to GTS, this move sees a wrestler place an opponent in a fireman's carry to drop the opponent in front of them. While the opponent is falling, the wrestler quickly lifts the left knee up toward the opponent's face. Kenta, the innovator of the maneuver, also uses an inverted variation in which he lifts his opponent into an Argentine backbreaker rack, throwing the opponent forward and striking his knee in the back of the opponent's head, called Ura Go 2 Sleep (Ura means inverted). CM Punk popularized the regular variant. As of 2022, the move was used by Logan Paul. Matt Riddle uses this move, calling it Bro to Sleep. Another version sees the wrestler kick the opponent's face as done by Dakota Kai, who occasionally uses this move, calling it GTK (Go to Kick). There is also a variant of this move in which a wrestler holds up their opponent in an Argentine Backbreaker Rack and then pop them up like an inverted fireman's carry takeover but then does a knee lift to their opponent. This variation is used by Sammy Guevara called GTH (Go to Hell) and Donovan Dijak called Feast your Eyes. A modified version sees the wrestler performing the GTS but, rather than dropping the opponent to execute the move, throwing the legs of the opponent out backward to rotate them 180°, before performing the knee lift to the opponent's face or lowering to a kneeling on a far knee to drop the opponent on whichever near knee. This version is best known as the TopSpin Facebuster used and named by Shane Helms. Another modified version sees a belly-to-back variation and the opponent is rotated in a full 360° motion as used by Zoey Stark, known as the Z-360.

=== High knee ===
A high knee

An attack in which a wrestler charges toward the opponent, then jumps up and raises a knee to hit the opponent, usually into the side of the head. This move has been closely associated with Harley Race, often being referred to as a "Harley Race High-Knee". It has also been popularized in Japan as a signature move by Jumbo Tsuruta and Jun Akiyama, and has later been used as a signature move by WWE Superstars Triple H and CM Punk.

==== Running single leg high knee ====
This variation, more akin to a running single leg dropkick, sees the attacking wrestler running and leaping toward the opponent while throwing one knee forward to strike the opponent's face. This move was made popular in Japan by Kenta ("Busaiku" knee) and later adopted by Daniel Bryan. Wrestlers Kenny Omega, Buddy Matthews, and Matt Riddle use a bicycle variant of the knee strike.

=== Kitchen sink ===
A standing wrestler waits for a charging opponent, more often than not after an Irish whip, a short-arm, or a rope rebound. The wrestler raises a knee laterally after taking a sidestep, striking the opponent's stomach and often flipping them over. Invented by Riki Choshu.

=== Knee lift ===
An attack in which a wrestler brings the knee up to hit the opponent under the chin as if performing an uppercut. This can either be performed in mid clinch or with the attacking wrestler charging at a kneeling or bent over opponent, lifting the knee upward to strike underneath the jaw or the side of the head. A double variation sets a wrestler standing in front of the opponent, then while performing the mid clinch, leaping to throw both knees upward to strike the opponent's chin, then releasing the hold to fall back on their feet. This move is notably used as a finisher by Giulia, who calls the move Arrivederci. A. J. Francis uses a running variation where he strikes his opponent on the ropes, which he calls the Tennessee Whiskey.

=== Shining wizard ===
A strike invented by The Great Muta delivered to an opponent down on one knee. After stepping off the opponent's raised knee with one foot, the wrestler swings the other leg and strikes the opponent's head with either the side of the knee or shin. A slight variation known as shining apprentice sees the wrestler use a running enzuigeri to the kneeling opponent's head without the use of the opponent's knee for leverage. Many other "shining" attacks exist, including big boots and dropkicks. The shining wizard can be applied to a standing opponent as well; this would be likely applied by stepping off the opponent's chest and then delivering a knee smash to the opponent's face. AJ Lee used this move as her finisher in her time in WWE. Nixon Newell uses this move as her finisher called The Shiniest Wizard. Eddie Edwards uses a version of this move as his finisher where he uses his knee to strike his opponent, known as the Boston Knee Party. Adam Cole uses a version of this move, called The Boom (formerly known as The Last Shot), where he strikes his opponent at the back of their head and neck.

=== Spinning knee ===
Also known as a discus knee or rolling knee, the wrestler advances toward a sitting or bent over opponent, performs a 360° spin and uses the momentum to deliver a jumping knee strike to the opponent's head. Former AEW and WWE wrestler Aleister Black uses this move as a signature against a standing opponent.

== Kick ==
A kick in wrestling is an attack using any part of the foot or lower leg to strike the opponent's body or head.

=== Back kick ===
Involves the attacker beginning by facing their opponent, then turning 180° and bending the rear leg at the knee or extending it backward in full, exploiting the turning momentum to strike the opponent in the chest or stomach. Also known as reverse side kick or heel kick. It is a very popular attack in Mexico, known by its original name La Filomena, for it was innovated and named by Murciélago Velázquez. A jumping back kick is a variation that involves the attacker conducting the turning motion while jumping.

Even though several other kicks may be confused with a back kick, it must be considered that these attacks are distinctively applied heel/calf-first.

=== Calf kick ===
This kick starts with a standing wrestler jumping to either side, connecting the side of their lead leg's calf-heel cord area to the opponent's face or chest. It was invented by Tsuyoshi Kikuchi in the early 1990s and called the "Zero-Sen Kick". It has also been used by CM Punk, Dean Malenko and John Morrison.

=== Leg lariat ===
Also referred to as jumping leg lariat or running calf kick, it sees an attacking wrestler charging toward an opponent, then taking a sidestep, the attacker jumps and wraps their lead leg's kneepit around the opponent's head or neck, knocking them to the ground. A variation has the attacking wrestler standing on the top turnbuckle or springboarding from the top rope to get the required height to execute it. Matt Cardona uses this move, calling it the Rough Ryder during his time in WWE as Zack Ryder before renaming it the Radio Silence after leaving WWE. Cardona's wife Chelsea Green also uses this move. Booker T also used this move throughout his WCW, WWF/E, and TNA career in which he stands in front of his opponent and then takes a few steps forward doing a Leg Lariat, he used this as a signature move, dubbing it the Harlem/Houston Sidekick.

=== Spin kick ===
Also known as reverse roundhouse kick, it sees the attacking wrestler spinning 360° on their rear foot gaining power and momentum from spinning in place, then connecting their lead foot's heel/calf to a charging opponent's face. It is common to see this move executed after an opponent is Irish whipped off the ropes. A short-arm variation is also possible. Tommy End uses this move and called it Black Mass in WWE and The End in AEW. Mickie James also uses this move and calls it the Mick Kick.

=== Spinning heel kick ===
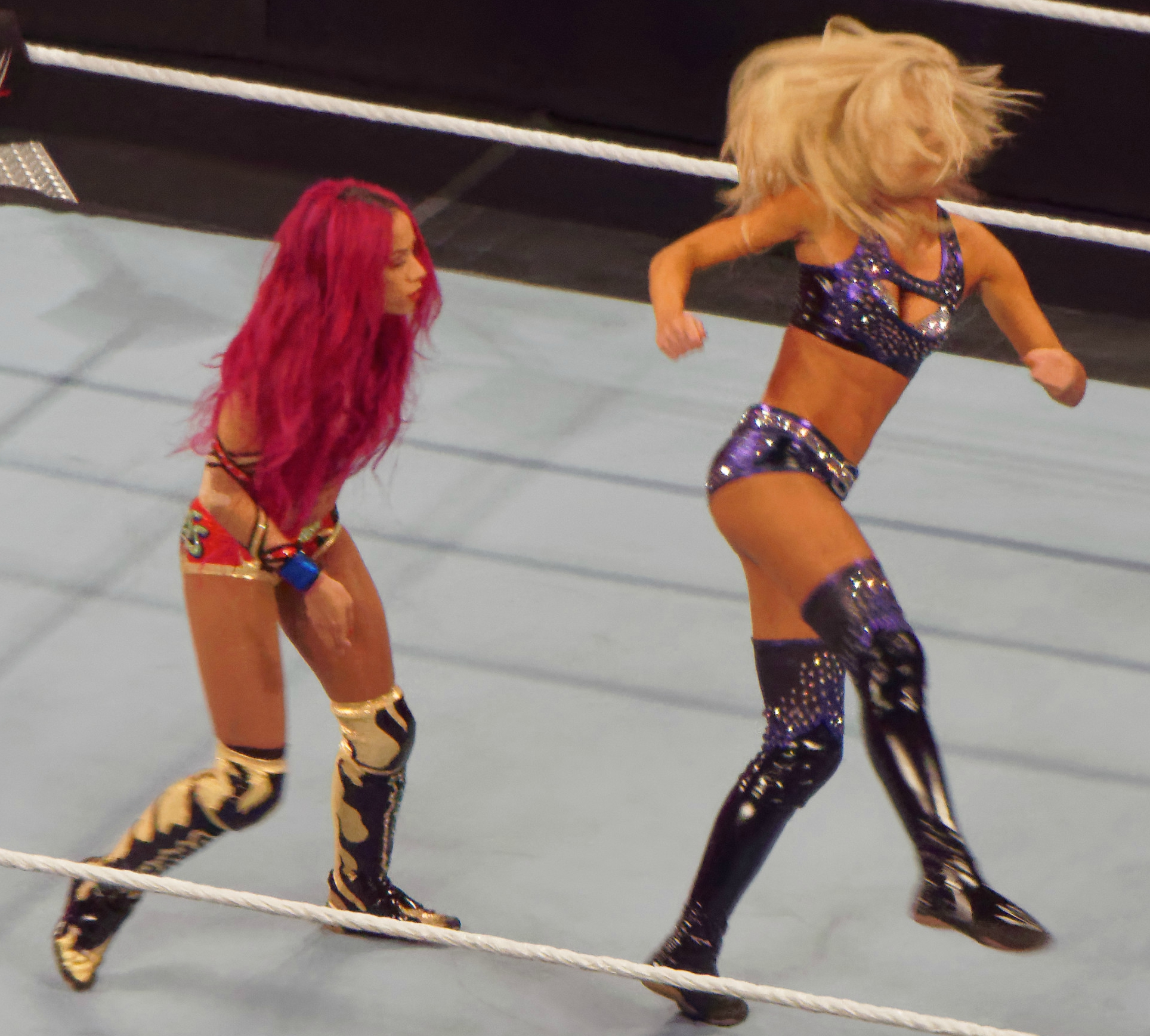
Summer Rae setting up to perform a spinning heel kick on Sasha Banks

Also known as a Spinning wheel kick, this is a jumping version of the spin kick that usually involves the wrestler spinning 360° so their body is somewhat horizontal before hitting the opponent with the back of their leg(s) or heel(s) on the opponent's face or chest. Tyler Breeze uses this move as his finisher called the Beauty Shot.

=== Dragon whip ===
This attack is performed after an opponent catches the leg of a wrestler who has attempted a kick of some sort (performing a maneuver known in wrestling as "Leg-feed"), then while the opponent throws the leg out away from themself, the wrestler continues spinning all the way out with their leg still extended to connect in the form of a spin or wheel kick. The move was popularized by Shelton Benjamin as both a signature and finishing move.

=== Rolling wheel kick ===
Properly named Abisegeri, and also known as rolling koppu kick or rolling liger kick, it sets the wrestler rolling toward a standing opponent, extending a leg which connects with the back, chest, or head of the opponent.

=== Scissors kick ===
Also known as jumping axe kick, this is a standing version of a leg drop performed on a bent over opponent usually in the middle of the ring. The wrestler bounces off the ropes, jumps, driving one leg into the back of the head / neck of the opponent, similar to a pair of scissors. Popularized by Booker T. Alicia Fox uses this move.

=== Superkick ===
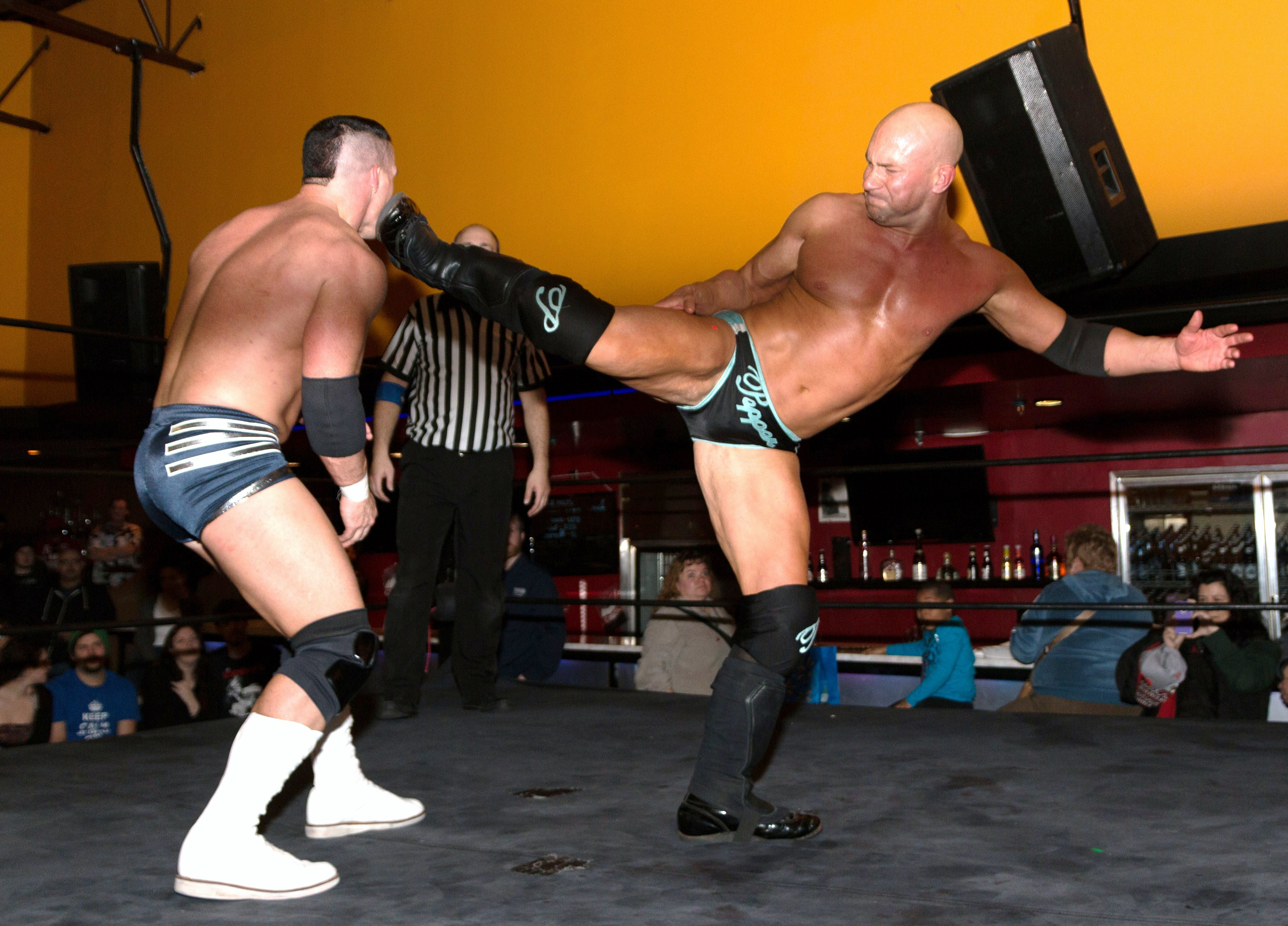
Pepper Parks performing a superkick on Tyson Dux

Often referred to as side kick or crescent kick, it sees the wrestler delivering a kick with the lead foot to the opponent's face, chin, neck or breastbone, usually preceded by a sidestep. "Gentleman" Chris Adams is credited for its innovation. It is famously the finisher of Shawn Michaels, who calls it Sweet Chin Music and usually adds theatrics before using the move. Nic Nemeth also uses this move as a tribute to Michaels. Tyler Breeze uses this as his signature move called the Supermodel Kick. James Storm uses this move as his finisher called the Last Call. Carmella uses this as one of her finishing moves called the Trash-talk/Princess Kick. The Usos and The Young Bucks also perform a simultaneous double superkick variation, the latter calling it Superkicks in Stereo or "Superkick Party". A slight variation of the Superkick where the wrestler performs the attack on an opponent who is on a lowered position, as in a seated or kneeling position, is sometimes referred to as Low Superkick. Sometimes, a Superkick can be performed with an added thigh slap, to produce the signature “pop” sound associated with the move. This move can also be performed the back of the opponent's head, mostly while they are standing or sitting.

=== Sole kick ===
A thrust where the wrestler turns the torso away lifting one leg horizontally and extending it toward the opponent, striking in the torso with the sole of their foot. A spin kick variation sees the wrestler spin around and then performing the kick with the outer leg, which is known as rolling sole butt in Japan. There is also jumping variation where the wrestler jumps straight up, spins in the air, and then delivers the sole butt with the outer leg targeting the head of the opponent.

A sole kick can be differentiated from any other because it is always applied with the ball/core of the foot in a thrusting fashion.

==== Big boot ====
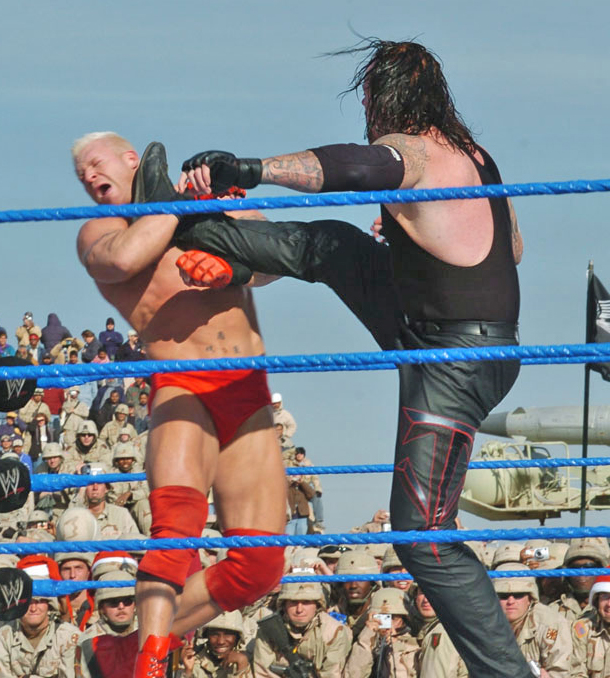
The Undertaker performs a big boot on Heidenreich

This attack is usually done with the opponent charging toward the wrestler, using the opponent's momentum to deliver the wrestler's sole to the upper-body or head. This move is commonly performed by tall wrestlers to enhance its view as a strong attack even though the wrestler themselves are not moving and the opponent is running into the foot, and because of that their height makes it easy for their legs to reach the head of normal-sized wrestlers. There is also an arched variation of this move. Sami Zayn uses this move calling it the Helluva Kick onto the cornered opponent. Billie Kay also uses this move calling it the Shades of Kay. Masahiro Chono uses a running variation on a seated opponent, called the Yakuza Kick. Charlotte Flair calls this move the Queen's Boot. Grado uses a running variation called the Wee Boot.

==== Bicycle kick ====
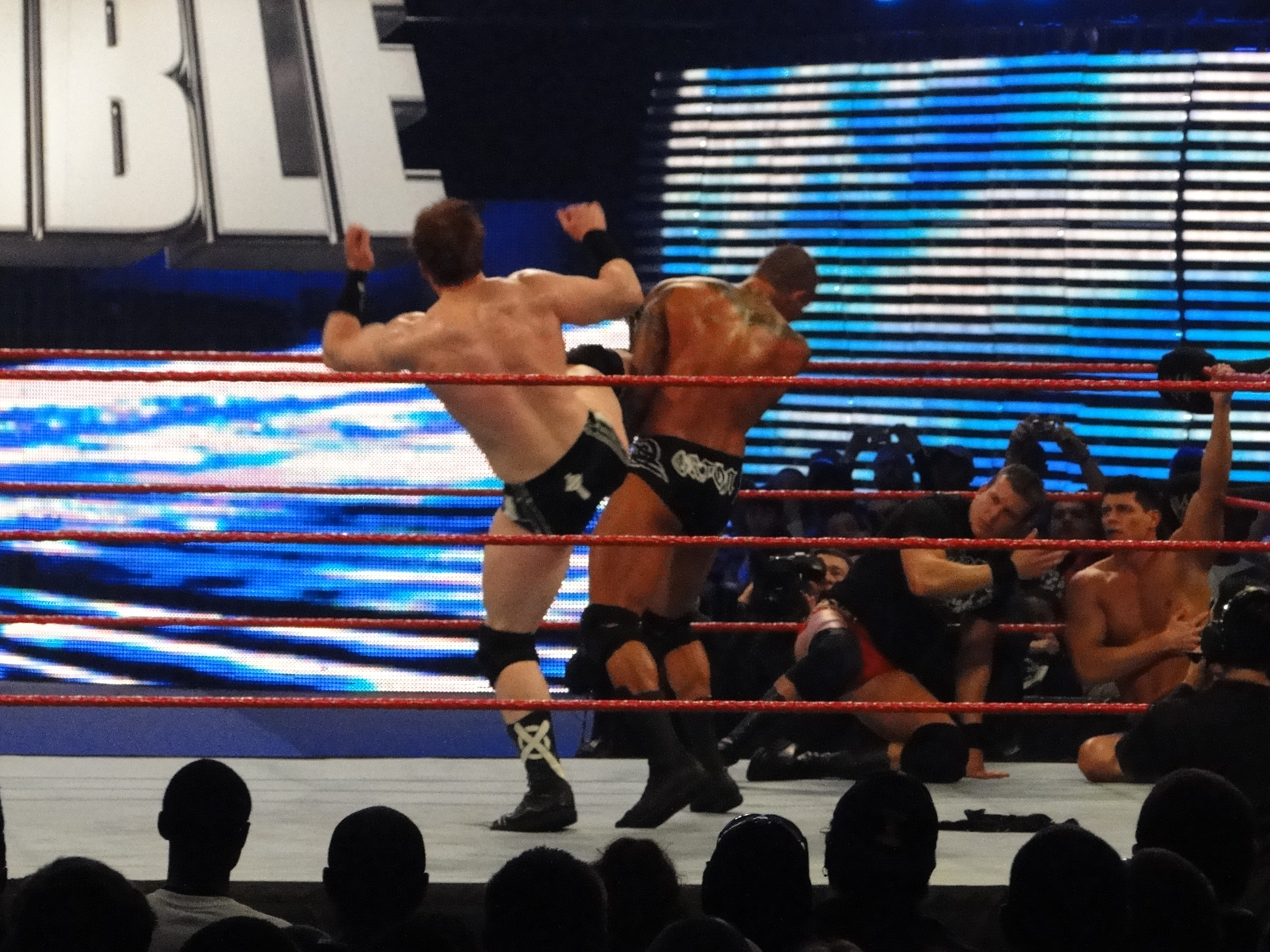
Sheamus performing his Brogue Kick (running bicycle kick) on Randy Orton

An attacking wrestler jumps up and kicks forward with one foot after the other in a pedalling motion, with the foot that gets lifted second being extended fully to catch a charging opponent directly in the face. Another variation sees the attacking wrestler charge at a standing opponent before delivering the attack. Similar in effect to the big boot. This move is used by Sheamus as a finisher, the Brogue Kick.

==== Dropkick ====
An attack where the wrestler jumps up and kicks the opponent with the soles of both feet, this usually sees the wrestler twist as they jump so that when the feet connect with the opponent one foot is raised higher that the other (depending on which way they twist) and the wrestlers fall back to the mat on their side or front. This is commonly employed by light and nimble wrestlers who can take advantage of their agility.

==== Kangaroo Kick ====
This attack sees a wrestler lying back on the mat or leaning at the turnbuckle, resting both arms on the top rope, waiting for the opponent's charge, the wrestler then throws both feet forward driving them to the opponent's stomach or face. Popularized by Bruno Sammartino.

==== Legsweep ====
The wrestler drops to one knee and extends the other leg to knock away the opponent's legs, then quickly pivots their body around.

===== Sweeping kick =====
In this variation of the legsweep the wrestler kicks one or both of the opponents legs to "sweep them off their feet", usually while either running towards the opponent or if the opponent is running towards them. Noam Dar uses this variant.

==== Mule kick ====
While facing away from a charging opponent, the wrestler bends down and pushes out one foot, striking the opponent with the bottom of it. A double mule kick variation is usually done with the wrestler facing away from the opponent, bending over and making a handstand. If acrobatically inclined, the wrestler can then roll forward, back into a standing position. Sometimes done in a corner, the wrestler takes hold on the top rope and kicks backward with both legs to the opponent, hitting with both soles.

==== Savate kick ====
The most commonly used savate kick in wrestling is the Chassé jambe arriére, a piston-action kick to an opponent's head or chin. This kick is often confused with the Superkick, but it can be differentiated for it is performed from an upright stance with the rear foot, instead of the lead foot. Rusev used a jumping version as a finishing move, calling it the Machka Kick.

=== Toe kick ===
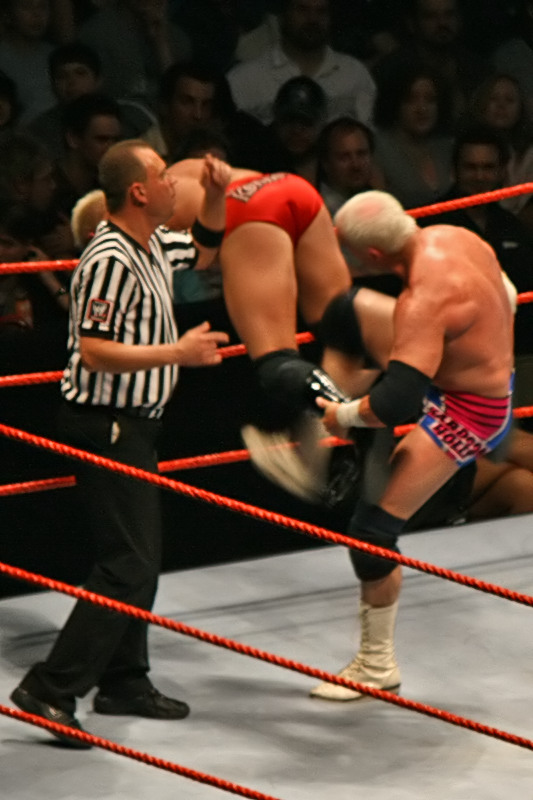
Hardcore Holly performing a snap kick to the midsection of a rope hung Mr. Kennedy

This kick, used by almost all wrestlers, is appealed just for show or as a setup for a hold or throw. The most common way to perform this attack is known as snap kick and sees the wrestler striking the opponent upward in the midsection or stomach to bend the opponent over. Another variation sees the wrestler holding back their own foot with one hand, taking it up their side or lower back and releasing it, striking a bent over opponent in the back of the head.

This maneuver can be differentiated from any other kick noting that it is always performed striking with the point of the foot-instep-shin area.

==== Backflip kick ====
Also known as the Péle kick after the association football player, the attacker performs a standing back flip while having their back to the opponent. The attacker then hits the opponent in the head with one or both legs, with the wrestler usually landing on hands and feet facing downward. Popularized by AJ Styles and also by Jinsei Shinzaki which he calls it Rinne. There are many variations of this maneuver since it can be performed from a backroll, a corkscrew, a handspring or a handstand.

==== Corner backflip kick ====
This variation, also known as tiger wall flip and popularized by Satoru Sayama, sees an opponent propped up in the corner as an attacking wrestler charges toward them, running up the ropes (beside the opponent), or in some cases, up the opponent, and, as they reach the top, kicking off the opponent's chest to perform a backflip so the wrestler lands on their hands and feet.

==== Cartwheel kick ====
The wrestler performs a cartwheel toward the opponent, hitting them in the head with the rear leg's shin as it comes up in the air. Popularized by Ernest "The Cat" Miller.

==== Crane kick ====
The wrestler first performs a crane stance by standing on one leg with the other knee raised and arms extended in a crane position. The wrestler then strikes the opponent's head or face with either the standing or raised leg.

==== Football kick ====
Sometimes also referred to as soccer kick. The wrestler strikes an opponent sitting on the mat with the foot extended downward vertically from the base of the spine to the back's midsection. Used by Katsuyori Shibata as the P.K. (penalty kick).

==== Gamengeri ====
Abbrived from the original Japanese gamen, meaning "face" and geri, meaning "cut", the wrestler jumps up, not taking a step or hold with the lead foot and kicks the opponent in the side of the head/face. The most famous practitioner of the gamengeri is Toshiaki Kawada. WWE stars Sonya Deville uses this move, as well as Noam Dar, who calls it the Nova Roller.

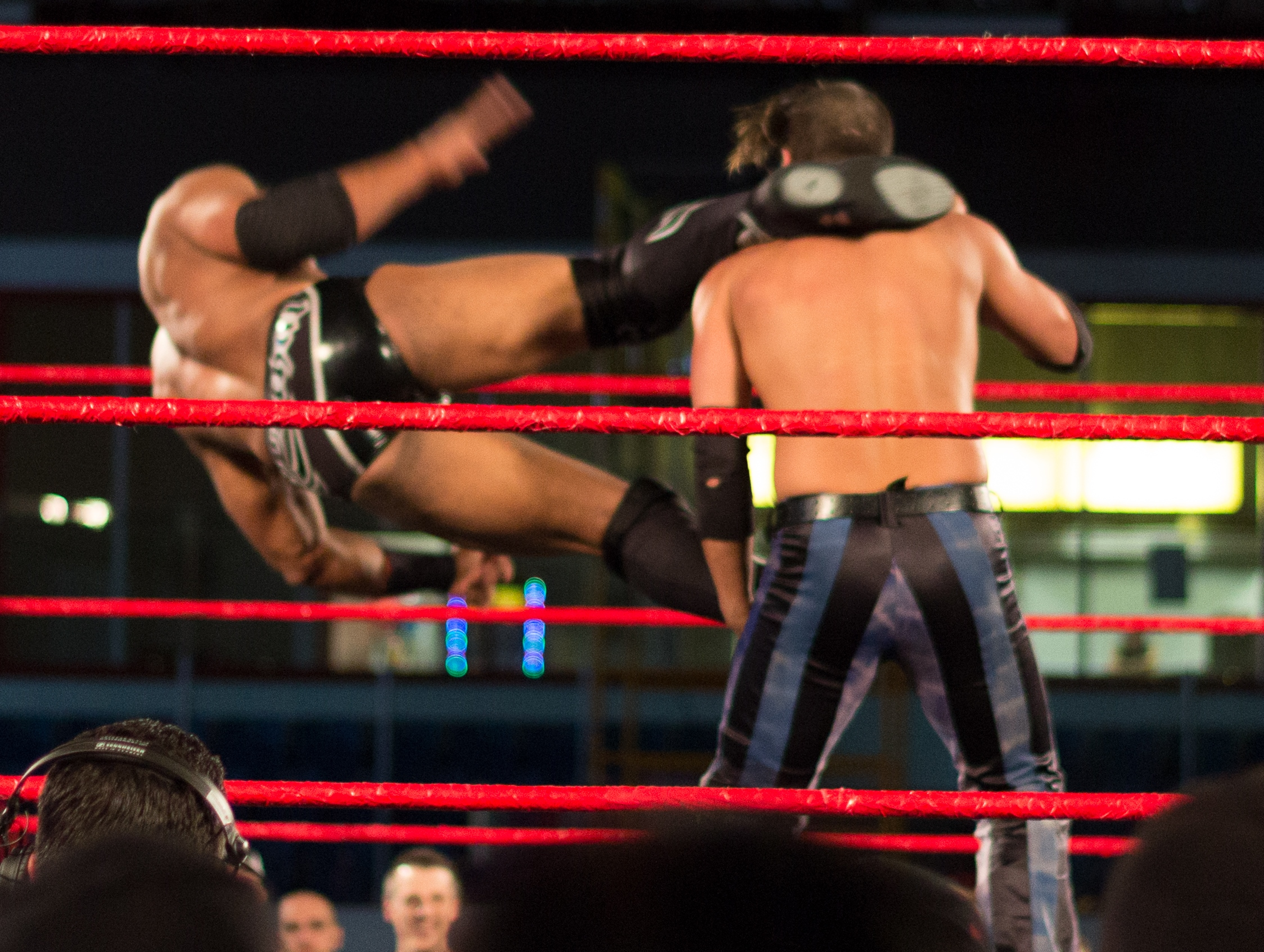
Jay Lethal hits an enzuigeri on Jimmy Jacobs

===== Enzuigeri =====
A variant on the gamengeri. The term enzui is the Japanese word for medulla oblongata and geri means "to chop". Thus, an enzuigeri (often misspelled 'ensuigiri' and 'enzuigiri' and mispronounced as 'enziguri') is any attack that strikes the back of the head. It is usually associated with lighter weight class wrestlers, as well as wrestlers who have a martial arts background or gimmick. It is often used as a countermove after a kick is blocked and the leg caught, or the initial kick is a feint to set up the real attack. A common variation of the enzuigeri sees the wrestler stepping up the opponent's midsection and hitting the back of the opponent's head with the other foot. Invented by Antonio Inoki. This move was also the finisher of the late WWF Superstar Bad News Brown dubbed the Ghetto Blaster. Akitoshi Saito later used the move and named it the "Sickle Of Death".

==== Overhead kick ====
In this version, the wrestler either starts by lying down or dropping down on the mat while the opponent stands near to their head. The wrestler then throws a leg and kicks up over their waist and chest, hitting the opponent with the point of the foot, usually in the head. It can be used as a counter to an attack from behind. For example, an opponent attempts a full nelson, the wrestler breaks the opponent's lock by raising both arms, falling to the canvas back-first and kicking the opponent in the head with one foot. This was used by Finn Balor. The move is also used by T.J. Perkins as his finisher, first lifting the opponent up in a fireman's carry position, then drops them down to execute the kick; the move is called the Detonation Kick. Jazmyn Nyx used a soccer-style bicycle kick as her finisher in reference to her professional soccer background.

==== Punt ====
Based on the field goal kick but named for the punt kick used in American football, sees the wrestler taking a run up to a kneeling opponent and strike them in the head with the point of the foot. It is similar to the soccer kick in MMA. WWE wrestler Randy Orton performed this move as his finisher maneuver to cause storyline concussions.

==== Roundhouse kick ====
Properly speaking, a roundhouse kick in wrestling is a variation of a shoot kick with a slight difference. While in the latter (a proper roundhouse kick in execution) the attack stops after connecting with the opponent, in a roundhouse kick the wrestler will keep spinning well past a sitting/kneeling opponent's head or a standing opponent's ribcage, giving a 180° or even a full 360° turn. This is famously used by Trish Stratus, which she calls the Chick Kick.

Daniel Bryan delivers Yes! Kicks (shoot kicks) to Triple H's chest at WrestleMania XXX.

==== Shoot kick ====
A kickboxing-style kick with the shin (generally protected by a shin guard) striking an opponent's face, chest or thighs. This move is used in shoot-style environments and by many Japanese wrestlers. In WWE, Daniel Bryan popularized the shoot kicks as the Yes! Kicks while the crowd would respond with a chant of "Yes!" every time a kick connected. The Miz would begin to use this move following his feud with Daniel Bryan, which would be dubbed the It Kicks. Shayna Baszler also uses this move. The move can be used in Japanese under the name "mawashi-geri", or the common Japanese word for a roundhouse kick.

==== Tiger feint kick ====
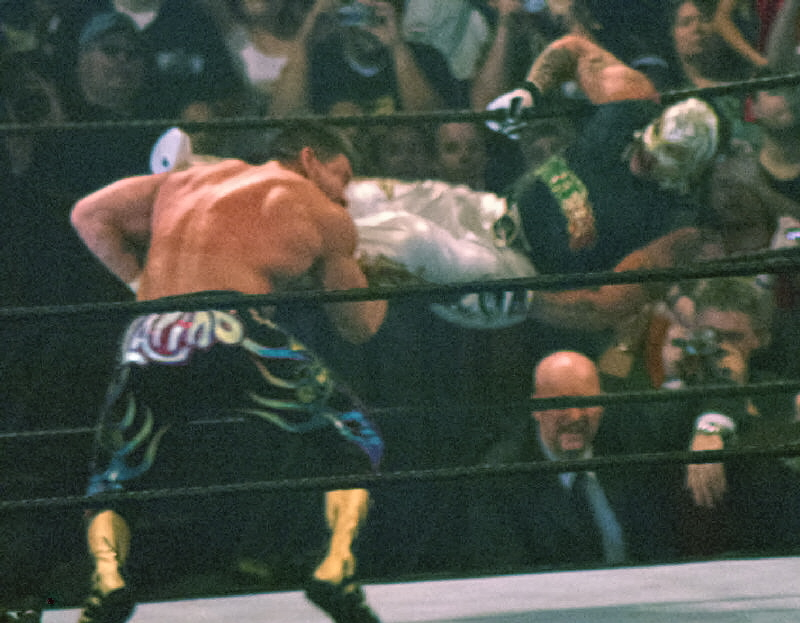
Rey Mysterio's 619 (tiger feint kick) on Eddie Guerrero

A move in which a wrestler jumps through the second and top rope while holding on to the ropes, using the momentum to swing back around into the ring. This move was invented by Japanese professional wrestling pioneer Satoru Sayama, competing as the original Tiger Mask (Tiger Mask I) in New Japan Pro-Wrestling (NJPW) during the early 1980s. Sayama originally designed the technique as a psychological misdirection rather than an offensive strike, performed as a fake dive to make opponents and fans think that the wrestler was about to dive through the ropes to opponents outside of the ring. It was later modified to become a kick to the head of an opponent who is hung on the second rope. This move requires high agility and is mainly used by smaller wrestlers in Japan and Mexico. It was popularized internationally by Rey Mysterio, who called the move 619 (after the area code for Mysterio's hometown). During his run as Rey Mysterio Jr., he adopted then evolved the move into a direct offensive impact maneuver during the 1990s in Mexico and popularized it globally in ECW, WCW, and WWE, which has also led to Jim Ross calling the move the Area Code Slam. It would since also be used by Dominik Mysterio, Iyo Sky and Claudio Castagnoli, with the latter referring to the move as the Swiss-1-9.

== Lariat ==
In wrestling, a lariat is performed when an attacking wrestler runs toward an opponent and wraps an arm around the opponent's upper chest or neck, forcing them to the ground. This move is similar to a clothesline, the difference being that in a clothesline the wrestler's arm is kept straight to their side during the move, while in the lariat the wrestler strikes the opponent with their arm often in a swinging motion and sometimes dropping face first besides the opponent.

Typically, a lariat is used as a finishing move while the clothesline is simply a basic strike attack. The main difference aside from the mechanics of the movement is the stiffness: a lariat is essentially a very stiff, swinging clothesline.

=== Crooked arm lariat ===
Performed when an attacking wrestler runs toward an opponent with the arm bent upward at the elbow 60–90 degrees and wraps the arm around the opponent's neck, forcing them to the ground. Hulk Hogan is often credited with being its innovator, popularizing it as the Axe Bomber. Takao Omori has also used the Axe Bomber as his main finisher, further popularizing the move. Brian Myers uses this move called the Roster Cut.

=== Discus lariat ===
The attacker performs a spinning motion before leaping their arm forward and knocking them down. This variation is notably used by Mike Santana as a finisher, who calls the move Spin the Block.

=== Flying lariat ===
The attacking wrestler first uses the ropes to build up speed, then leaps forward and wraps their arm around the opponent's neck, knocking them down. The move is noted to have been used by several high-flying wrestlers such as Ricochet, Will Ospreay (who refers to the move as the Pip Pip Cheerio) and Logan Paul, and is also used by wrestler "Hangman" Adam Page (who refers to the move as the Buckshot).

=== Lariat takedown ===
The wrestler runs toward their opponent, wraps an arm around the opponent's upper chest and neck, and swings both legs forward, using this momentum to pull the opponent down with them to the mat back-first. Popularized by "Macho Man" Randy Savage.

=== Leg drag ===
Also known as low-angle discus lariat or dragon screw sets the attacking wrestler waiting for a charging opponent, the wrestler then takes a sidestep, extends an arm and lowers the upper body all at once in a swinging motion, turning up to 180 degrees, hooking the back of the opponent's nearest knee to trip them down to the mat back first. It was one of Bob Backlund's many signature moves.

=== Northern lariat ===
Also called an enzui lariat, it sets the attacking wrestler charging against the opponent's back, driving them to the mat face first.

=== Pendulum lariat ===
A wrestler performs a tilting sequence, similar to that of an actual pendulum, in between the ring ropes (usually near a ringpost) in order to gain momentum to perform an attack or a counterattack before striking the opponent hard. Nigel McGuiness is known for utilizing it as the Jawbreaker Lariat and Jon Moxley as the Lunatic Lariat.

=== Short-arm lariat ===
A variation where the wrestler grabs one of the opponent's wrists with a hand and pulls the opponent closer, striking with their other arm. This was popularized by Kazuchika Okada as the Rainmaker. This can also be used in combination with a hammerlock as in the case of Ariya Daivari.

=== Western lariat ===
This maneuver is performed when the wrestler does not run, but simply strikes the opponent while standing next to them or waiting for a charging opponent. Popularized by Stan Hansen. The wrestler can also hold the opponent's head up before performing the lariat with their other arm. Kenta Kobashi uses this variation as one of his finishing moves, calling it the Burning Lariat. Shingo Takagi uses this move as one of his finishing moves, calling it the Pumping Bomber. Go Shiozaki uses this move as his finishing move and calls it the Gowan Lariat.

== Palm strike ==
This move sees the wrestler delivering an open-handed strike with arm movement akin to a cross, usually to the opponent's chin, face or chest. This is a legitimate offensive-defensive maneuver in karate known as Shotei uchi and is often performed by wrestlers with known martial arts background, particularly in Japan where it is often associated to former sekitori. Several of these attacks can also be performed with the opponent in a side headlock. Io Shirai uses this move. Juice Robinson, formerly known as CJ Parker during his tenure in FCW and NXT, used this move as a signature move and referred to it as the Left Hand of God, later calling it the Third Eye. CJ Parker accidentally broke Kevin Owens' nose performing a palm strike when Kevin Owens made his NXT debut.

=== Forehand chop ===
Sometimes referred to as a frying pan or an open-hand chop. Despite the name, it refers to a slap properly and not a chop. The wrestler strikes downward the chest, nape or back of an opponent, using the open palm of the hand.

==== Double open hand chop ====
Also called blazing chop, this variation sees a standing wrestler striking the chest of a charging opponent with both palms sideways, shoving them down to the mat back first.

=== Slap ===
The wrestler delivers an overpowering open-hand slap crossing the opponent's face, ears, or nape. This simple strike is more often performed by female wrestlers or villains. A variation associated to Dusty Rhodes and his family involves a charging wrestler attacking with a slap as if performing a clothesline. Human Tornado often used a backhand variation called the Pimp Slap.

==== Double slap ====
Also known as a bell clap, the wrestler slaps both ears of an opponent simultaneously with the palms of both hands, disorienting their balance. It is often used as a counter for a bear hug.

=== Uppercut ===
Properly speaking, an uppercut is a punch used in boxing that usually aims at the opponent's chin. It is, along with the hook and the overhand, one of the main punches that count in statistics as a "Power punch", while in wrestling, any close-fisted punch is considered an illegal attack. Therefore, it is an upward variant of a palm strike in execution. Usually seen performed by tall, heavy wrestlers like Kane and Goldust.

Nevertheless, a close-fisted uppercut has been seen in wrestling from time to time usually meant as a "cheap shot". Extensively used by "Rowdy" Roddy Piper in that same matter.

== Punch ==
An illegal attack using a simple close-fisted punch, normally to the stomach, lower back, or head of the opponent. Unlike most illegal attacks, punches almost never result in disqualification in North America. Instead, the referee simply admonishes the wrestler to stop, usually to no effect. In traditional-style European wrestling, if spotted by the referee, it usually results in a formal warning (such as the British "public warning", French "avertisement" or German yellow card) three of which bring disqualification - consequently in these territories heels go to great lengths to conceal punches from the referee and thus trigger major crowd heat when they succeed.

In America, punches are often used by both heels and faces alike. When heels perform the strike either while the opponent is not expecting it, or while the referee is in some way distracted, it seems more devastating.

Several boxing punches can be found in wrestling, such as jabs, straights, hooks and overhands.

=== Back fist ===
Often aimed at a kneeling opponent or one sat on the top turnbuckle. In this variation of a simple close-fisted punch, the wrestler strikes the opponent with the back of the fist in the head or chest, often repeatedly.

==== Spinning back fist ====
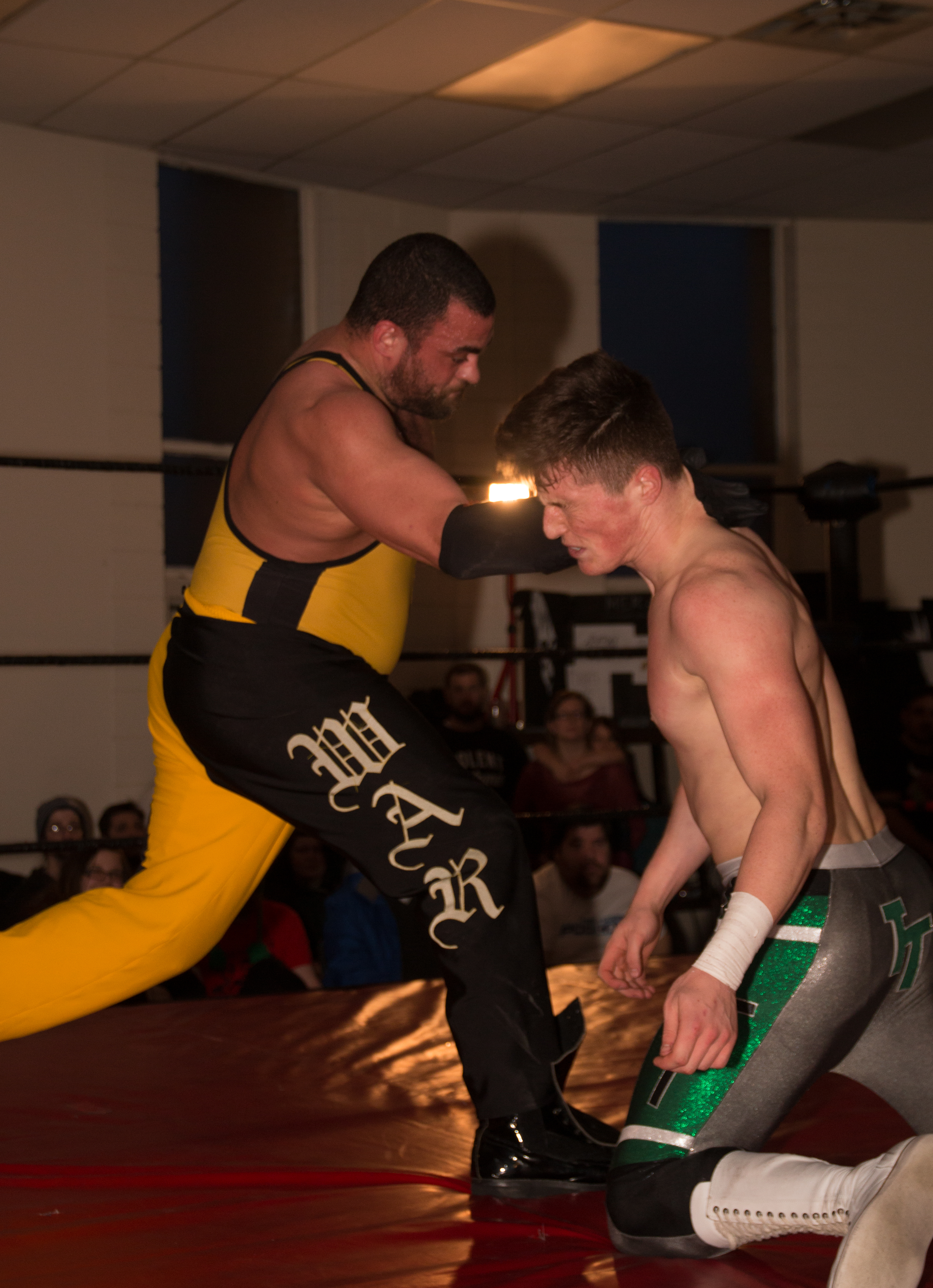
Eddie Kingston executing a spinning backfist against Tyler Thomas

The wrestler holds an arm out horizontally and executes a back fist whilst turning the body swiftly, hitting the opponent on rotation. Used by Aja Kong as the Uraken, Vader, Awesome Kong, Andrade, and Eddie Kingston, who calls it the Backfist to the Future.

=== Discus punch ===
Also named spinning punch or tornado punch. The attacker performs a 180 or 360 degree turn similar to a discus motion and hits the opponent in the head with a swinging hook.

=== Double punch ===
This simply sees the attacker punching with both fists simultaneously, usually targeting the opponent's head or chest. Dusty Rhodes is best noted for this type of attack as a signature in which he stuns his opponents with a series of jabs first then punches them in their chest.

=== Flapjack punch ===
The attacker lifts a charging opponent up in the air as if performing a back body drop, but instead of tossing them over their head, the attacker pushes the opponent upward, performing a flapjack. As the opponent falls to the mat face-first, the attacker hits the opponent with a liver shot. Popularized by Ludvig Borga.

=== Heart punch ===
The wrestler raises the opponent's left arm up over their head, sometimes folding it back behind the neck as well, then delivers a strong straight into the side of the ribcage. The move is alleged to rely on "Oriental pressure points" to strike a nerve causing the opponent's heart to momentarily stop, rendering them unconscious. Stan "The Man" Stasiak, Ox Baker and Big John Studd are professional wrestlers well known for their use of the heart punch as a wrestling maneuver. Mean Mark Callous used this move as a finisher early in his career.

=== Mounted punches ===
This attack involves a wrestler standing on the middle or top ropes and delivering repeated crosses to the face while the opponent is backed up against the turnbuckles. A variation sees the wrestler striking a fallen opponent, either mounting in front of them or kneeling beside, and having the opponent in a side headlock. The crowd tends to count the punches, which typically end at ten, provided they're not interrupted by the opponent pushing the wrestler off or by the referee admonishing the attacking wrestler.

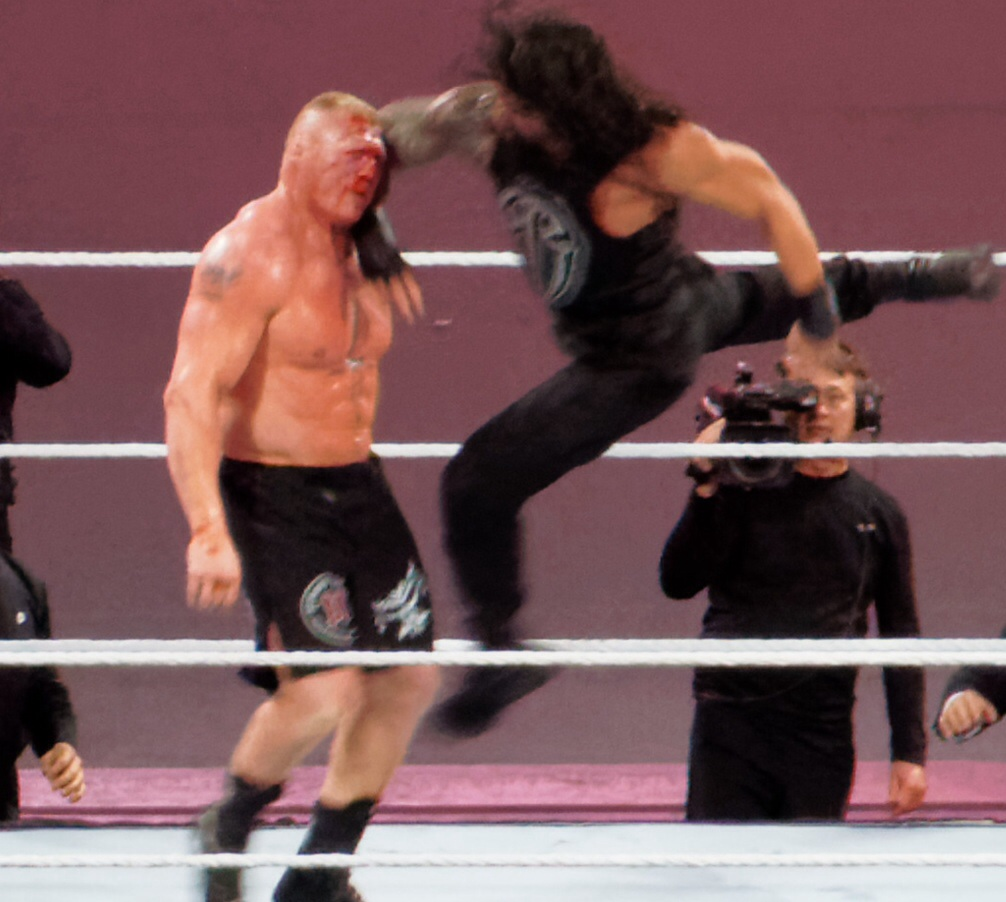
Roman Reigns' Superman punch on Brock Lesnar

=== Superman punch ===
Similar to the Muay Thai version, this attack sees a wrestler leap into the air, snapping the rear leg back before striking with a swinging overhand to the opponent's head. Popularized by Roman Reigns and Orange Cassidy as the Orange Punch

=== Wind-up punch ===
A theatrical variation in which the wrestler rotates the attacking arm in a "winding-up" motion before striking the opponent, making the punch appear more effective in the same way as a bolo punch in boxing. Hulk Hogan is known for this move as a babyface earlier in his career.

== Senton ==
In the same sense of a press or a splash, the wrestler jumps over an opponent, but in this case the attacker falls lower-back first or into a sitting position. Some wrestlers may perform this move in a cannonball style.

In Spanish, the word senton (Properly spelled as Sentón) refers to landing on the lower back or buttocks after taking a fall, either on purpose (as for comedic effect) or accidentally.

=== Body guillotine ===
Having a fallen opponent lying next to the apron, the attacking wrestler grabs the opponent's head, torso, or leg and places it on the bottom rope. Taking hold of the top rope, the wrestler proceeds to jump and sit repeatedly on the opponent's neck, chest, or leg as they stomp hard, to hurt or incapacitate the opponent.

==== Leapfrog body guillotine ====
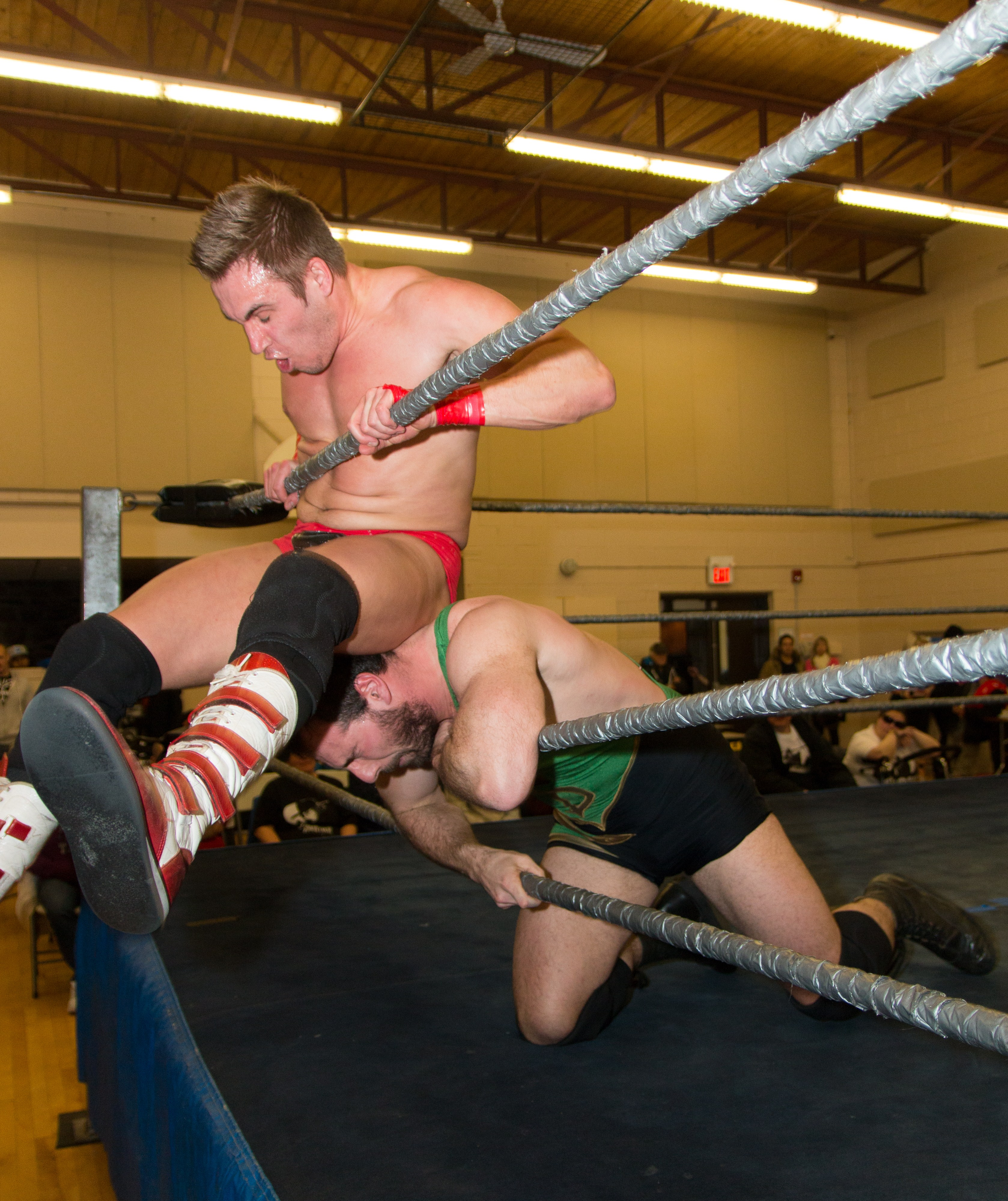
Tyler Tirva (left) performs a leapfrog body guillotine on Andrew Davis.

This move sees the opponent's chest resting on the second rope, facing out of the ring. The attacker runs from behind, performs a leapfrog, and lands on their opponent's back, neck, or head, sliding through the ropes out of the ring as they force the opponent's chest against the second rope.

=== Bronco buster ===
With an opponent seated in the corner of the ring, the attacking wrestler jumps in the corner, straddling on the opponent's midsection, bouncing up and down. Often treated as having comic or sexual connotations rather than as a legitimately painful move, due to the move's resemblance to a teabag. Popularized by Sean Waltman, although Mae Young was known for using it long beforehand.

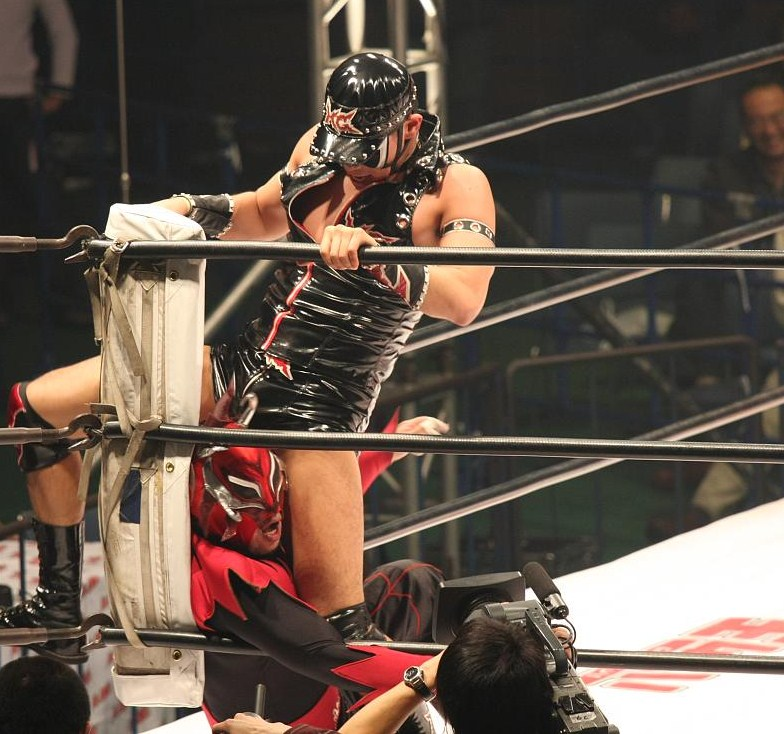
Razor Ramon HG performing a Bronco Buster

==== Koronco buster ====
Similar to a bronco buster, the attacking wrestler jumps onto a standing opponent in the corner, straddling and sitting on the opponent's chest, while resting feet on the second rope. The attacking wrestler then follows with mounted punches.

=== Hip attack ===
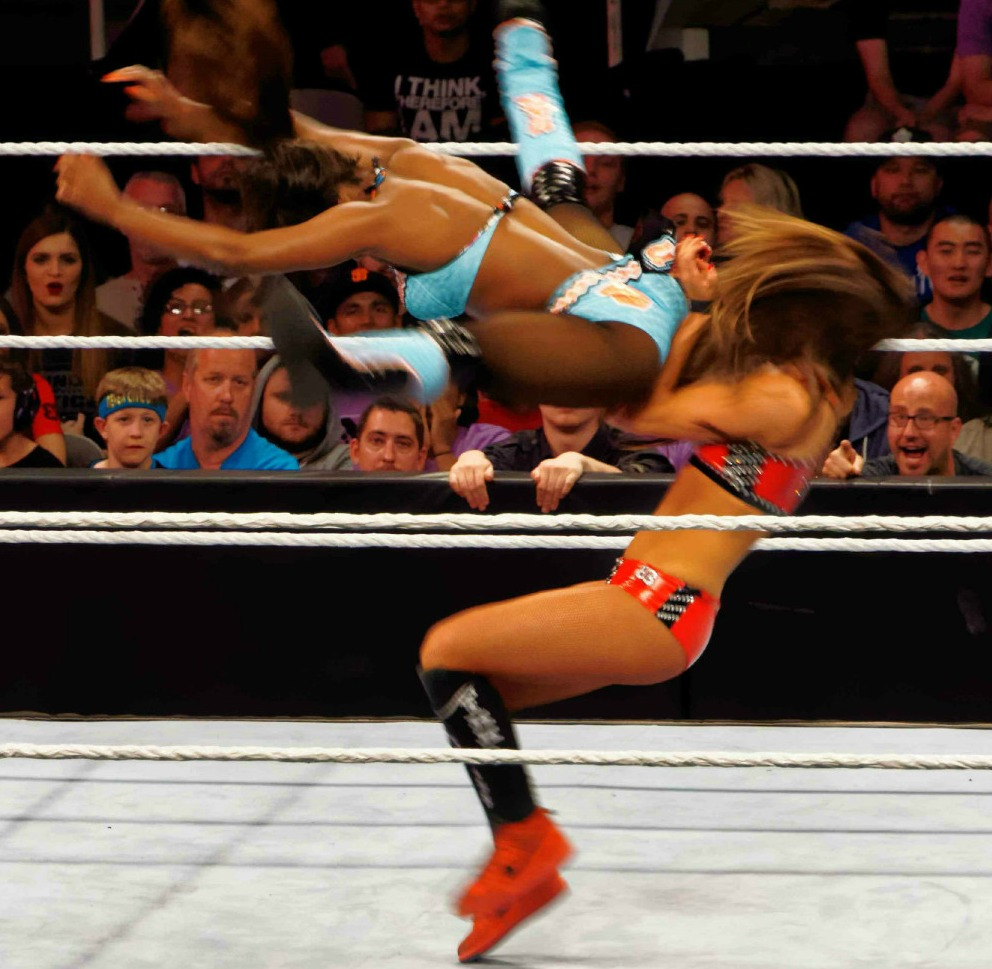
Naomi hitting the Rear view (Hip attack) on Nikki Bella

Also named rear view or butt thump, is usually performed with a running start, then the attacking wrestler jumps into the air, spinning around, and thrusting the pelvis backward, thus hitting the opponent's face or chest with hip or buttocks. A standing variation called butt-butt is performed by a wrestler turning the back to a charging opponent and then just bending over so the opponent bumps their stomach against the wrestler's hip. Another variation called reverse body avalanche sees large, heavy wrestlers giving the back to a cornered opponent as they take hold on the top rope, thrusting the pelvis repeatedly against the opponent's midsection as if performing turnbuckle thrusts. It is notably used by Naomi and by Jaida Parker, the latter referring to it as Hip-notic.

=== Seated senton ===
Also known as vertical splash or butt drop, is the most common form to perform this maneuver. A wrestler jumps down to a sitting position across the chest or stomach of a fallen opponent. This particular move is usually executed one of two ways. One sees the wrestler stand over the opponent and drop to either a seated position (like Rikishi) or a kneeling position (like Bastion Booger's Trip to the Batcave). The other is performed with the opponent lying near one of the turnbuckles, with the wrestler climbing to the middle rope and bouncing on it before performing the senton (Yokozuna's Banzai Drop). A variation of the seated senton was performed by Earthquake, whose Earthquake Splash would see him run off the ropes to gain momentum for the senton and then jump onto the opponent while running. It is also an obvious and often-used counter to the sunset flip.

=== Somersault senton ===
Another slight variation on a standard senton sees the attacking wrestler jump and flip forward 180° so that the lower back impacts on the opponent's chest or head. Bam Bam Bigelow, Satoru Asako, Mighty Inoue, Nia Jax and other wrestlers have used this as a signature move.

==== Cannonball ====
Kevin Steen hitting a cannonball on Twiggy

A somersault senton performed to an opponent sitting in a corner to be sandwiched between the turnbuckle and the wrestler's lower back, commonly used by Kevin Owens.

== Shoulder block ==
A maneuver that sees a standing wrestler strike usually ramming with a shoulder, by keeping an arm down by the side into a charging opponent's chest or abdomen. Often this will see a larger wrestler displaying superior size and strength by challenging an opponent to attack, standing still slightly to one side and having the opponent charging toward trying to execute a strike, only to get knocked down (often several times) and see any attempt of the hapless opponent having no effect. A slight variation called body block, sees an opponent run at the large wrestler who would simply engulf the charging opponent by swinging their arms round and forcing the opponent to impact the wrestler's entire body.

=== Chop block ===
This variation, based on the illegal American football block, sees the wrestler performing this attack coming from behind an opponent and dropping down to connect with their shoulder into the back of one of the opponent's knees. This is often used to weaken the leg for submission holds, as noted by Ric Flair's extensive use of the move as a set-up for his Figure Four Leglock. AJ Styles and Cash Wheeler use this move as set-up for the Calf Crusher and Indian Deathlock, respectively.

=== Pounce ===
The attacking wrestler runs the ropes to gain momentum before leaping at the opponent with a high shoulder block. This variation is usually either preceded by an Irish Whip to an adjacent side of the ring or used to cut-off an opponent already running the ropes, further increasing the move' s impact. It was popularized by Monty Brown and named for his Alpha Male gimmick. The move is also used by Mojo Rawley, Keith Lee, Lance Archer and Nyla Rose.

=== Short-arm shoulder block ===
A variation where the wrestler grasps one of the opponent's wrists firmly with both hands and pulls the opponent's arm toward them. From this point on, the attack can be executed one of two ways. In one, the wrestler rams their shoulder repeatedly against the opponent's own to incapacitate or hurt the arm, setting it up for a submission or as a mean of punishment. Popularized by Diamond Dallas Page and Batista.

In the other, the wrestler strikes lunging their shoulder against the opponent's chest or chin, then releasing the hold to leave the opponent fall to the mat. This maneuver was performed extensively by Beth Phoenix.

=== Spear ===
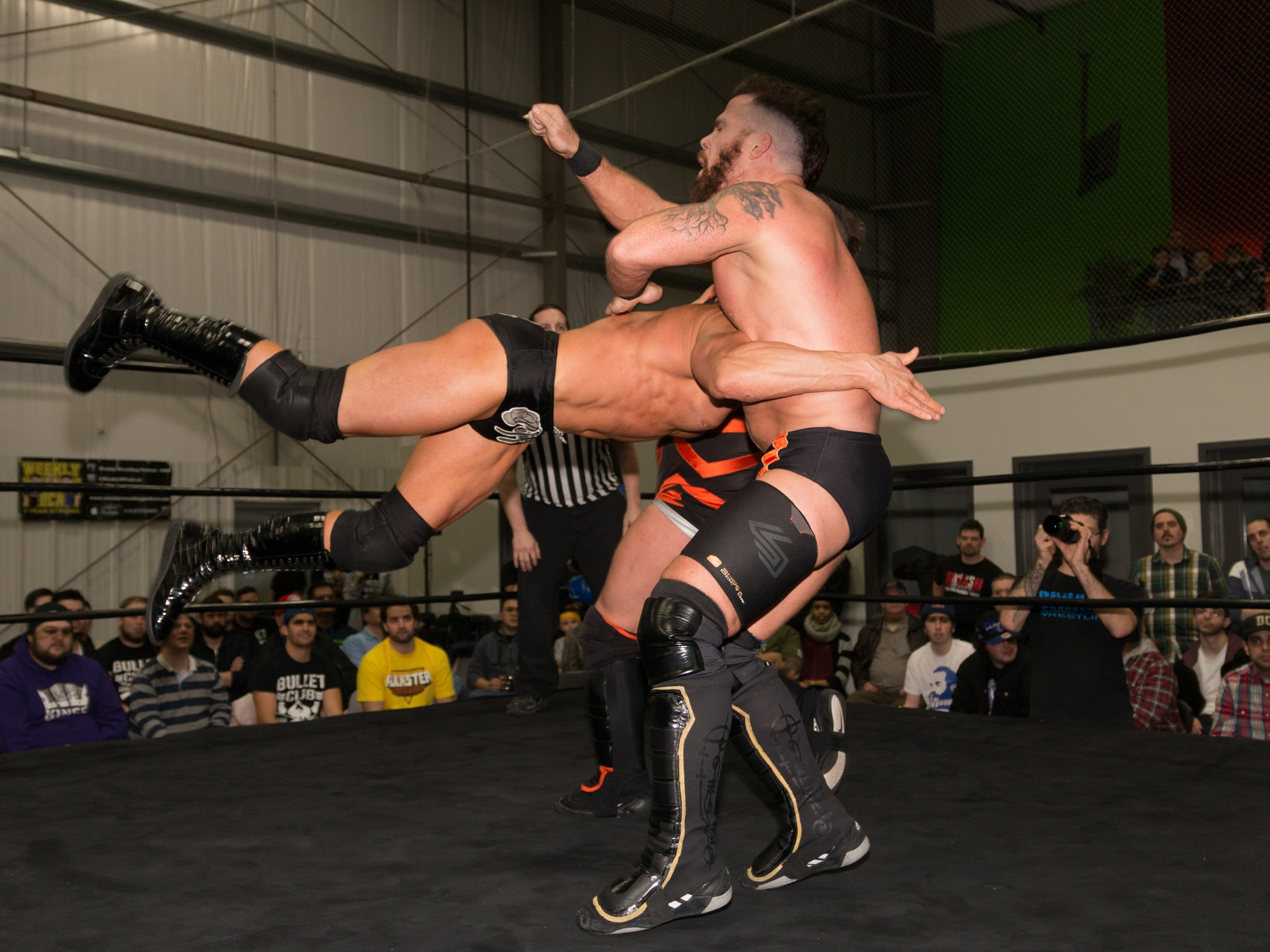
Pepper Parks simultaneously hits Tyson Dux and Scotty O'Shea with a spear.

This sets an attacking wrestler charging toward a standing opponent, bringing the body parallel to the ground and driving one shoulder into the opponent's midsection, pulling on their legs, as in a double leg takedown, and forcing them back-first into the mat. This move has been used by many famous wrestlers as a signature and finisher. Goldberg is the wrestler who is credited to have invented the spear and is most commonly associated with the move, using it as a set-up for his Jackhammer slam. Other wrestlers including Edge, Batista, Bobby Lashley, Roman Reigns, Moose, Christian Cage, Bron Breakker, Jey Uso and A. J. Francis have made the spear either their finishing or signature moves, the latter of whom calls the move TFNL (short for The F'n Legend).

==== Jumping spear ====
Also known as a Leaping spear, this version sees the wrestling jump as they are charging towards to opponent just before making contact with their shoulder. Ricky Starks and Bron Breakker use the move as a finisher.

==== Striking spear ====
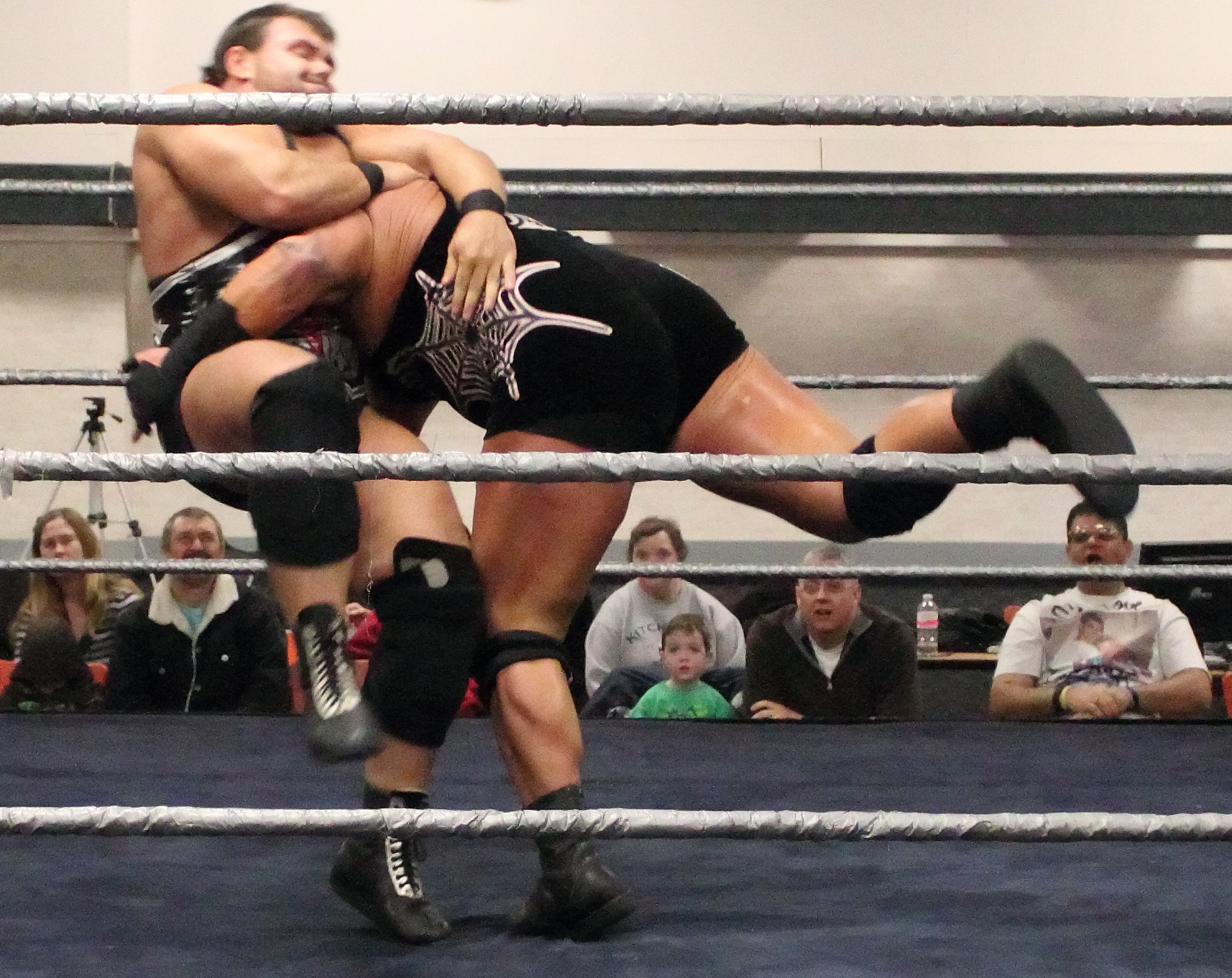
Rhyno performing the Gore on Michael Elgin in 2011

In this variation, the wrestler does not pull on the opponent's legs in a double leg takedown, relying only on the strike's momentum to force the opponent down. Rhyno uses this variation as his finisher, calling it the Gore.

==== Spear with multiple punches ====
This variation of spear is laying the opponent down with a spear and punching them with Thesz press punches.

=== Turnbuckle thrust ===
This move is performed to an opponent set up resting back first against the turnbuckle. Then the wrestler takes hold of the second rope with both hands, opens their arms, and strikes, driving the attacking shoulder into the opponent's midsection, often repeatedly, as the attacker swings their legs back and forth to gain momentum. A variation sees smaller wrestlers using the tops of their heads instead of the shoulder or running from the center of the ring.

== Splash ==
A splash is an attack very similar to a body press in function but not in execution. The difference lies in that it is executed from a falling position. Most of the times the attack is performed horizontally, and most variations can seamlessly transition into a pin.

=== Big splash ===
Bono-chan performing a big splash against Commander An Jo

This maneuver involves a wrestler jumping forward and landing stomach-first across an opponent lying on the ground below. On some occasions a wrestler has a short running start before executing the move. This was the finisher of many super heavyweight superstars in the 1980s and 1990s, used by superstars such as the One Man Gang, Kamala, Tugboat, Tyrus, Mark Henry, Haystacks Calhoun, Bam Bam Bigelow, Vader, Viscera, Big Boss Man, King Kong Bundy, Rikishi, and many other super heavyweights throughout the years. It is also even used by some non-superheavyweights, such as Ultimate Warrior and Big E.

=== Cartwheel splash ===
The attacking wrestler performs a cartwheel before landing stomach-first across an opponent lying on the mat. Usually performed by small, nimble wrestlers.

=== Crossbody ===
Also known as crossbody block, a wrestler jumps onto their opponent and lands horizontally across the opponent's torso, forcing the opponent to the mat and usually resulting in a pinfall attempt. There is also an aerial variation, known as a diving crossbody, where a wrestler leaps from an elevated position toward the opponent. This attack is known as a Plancha in Lucha libre.

==== Tilt-a-whirl crossbody ====
An uncommon variation of the move which sees the wrestler being held and spun into a tilt-a-whirl by the opponent. When the wrestler reaches a point where they are horizontally positioned against the opponent's torso, they fall down, pushing the opponent onto their back against the canvas. This move is better described as a counter for a tilt-a-whirl backbreaker, or for a tilt-a-whirl mat slam.

== Stomp ==
Also known as foot stomp, this attack sees a wrestler stamping a foot on any part of a fallen opponent. One variation performed by large, heavy wrestlers implies simply to step on the opponent's stomach as they walk, often referred to as a big walk. This variation, when performed by a villain, aims to the head of the opponent but in a crudest, vicious way.

=== Curb stomp ===
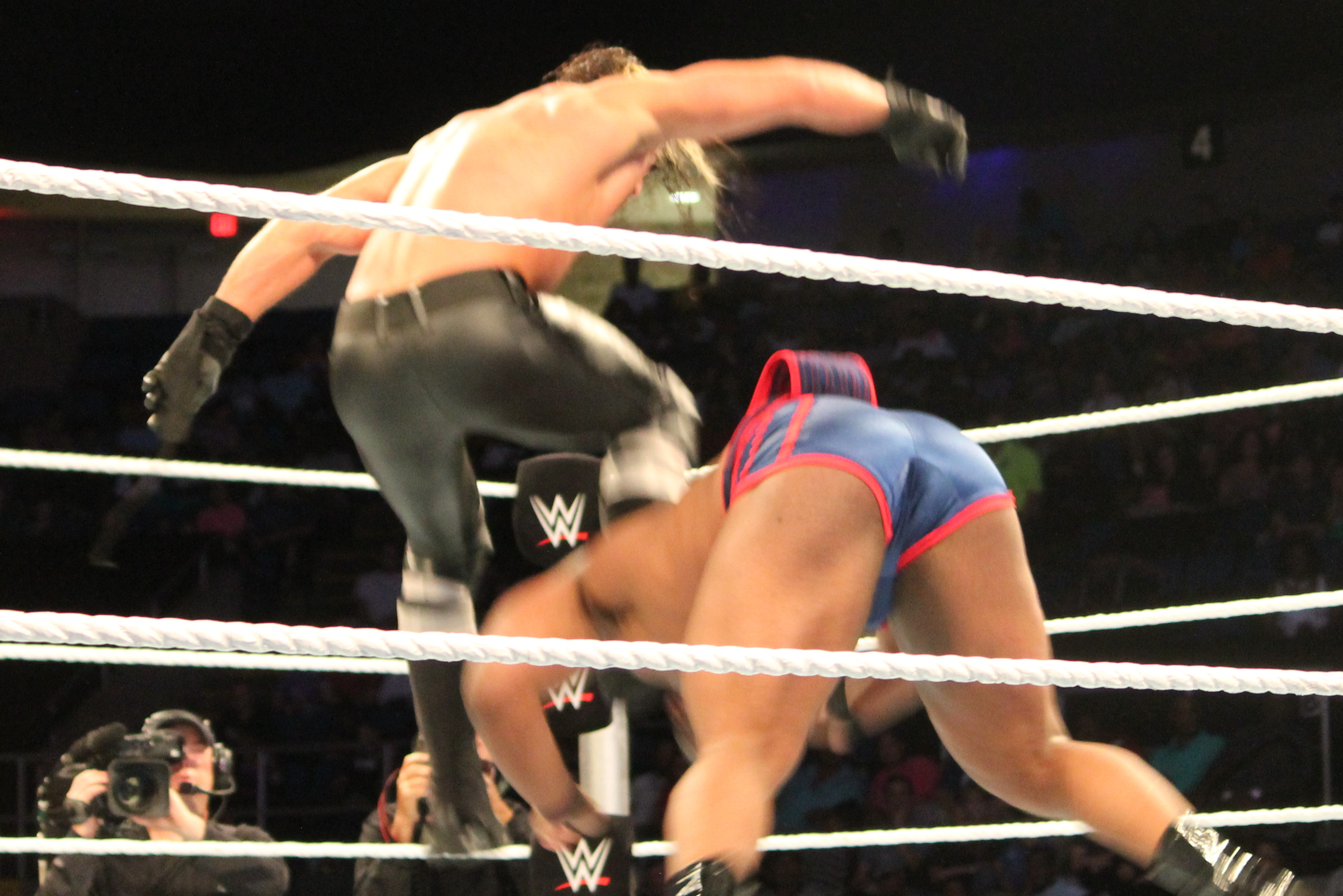
Seth Rollins performing a Curb Stomp on Big E

A move where a wrestler grabs the opponent's legs lying on the floor before wrapping them in a standing inverted Indian deathlock position and then pulling their arms in a standing surfboard before stomping the back of the opponent's head. This was invented by Super Dragon.

Naomichi Marufuji innovated a facebuster version of this move which sees him perform a running jumping stomp to the back of the head of an opponent who's bent-over or on all fours, forcing the opponent face-first into the ground. WWE wrestler Seth "Freakin" Rollins currently uses this move as a finisher. He has also used diving and springboard versions of this move against a bent over opponent.

=== Double foot stomp ===
When a wrestler jumps and stamps both feet on any part of an opponent. Also known as double stomp. Known as La Lanza in Mexico, and used as the signature move of Perro Aguayo and his son Perro Aguayo Jr.. This can be performed from an elevated position as a diving double foot stomp as done by Finn Bálor, who uses this move as his finisher called the Coup de Grâce. Cameron Grimes uses a running variation called the Cave-In, formerly known as the Caveman Stomp. Swerve Strickland also uses the diving variant, but executes it on an opponent on a seated position, which has been dubbed the Swerve Stomp. Large, heavy wrestlers often perform this move by simply standing over a defenseless opponent next to the apron both feet and grabbing a hold on the top rope, squashing the fallen body.

==== Moonsault double foot stomp ====
This variation sees the wrestler perform a diving moonsault, but instead of landing on a fallen opponent in the splash position, the wrestler continues the rotation driving both feet into the opponent. Sonjay Dutt uses this as an occasional finishing move named Moonstomp.

=== Garvin stomp ===
A wrestler performs a series of stomps all over the body of a fallen opponent in the order of left arm, left chest, left stomach, left upper leg, left lower leg, right lower leg, right upper leg, right stomach, right chest, right arm, and finally the jaw. Innovated by and named after the former NWA World Heavyweight Champion Ron Garvin in the late 1980s. It was later popularized by Randy Orton.

== Transition moves ==
Some moves are meant neither to pin an opponent, nor weaken them or force them to submit, but are intended to set up the opponent for another attack.

=== Discus ===
This is a move in which a wrestler will spin in place before hitting an attack, like the discus clothesline, discus punch, discus forearm or the discus lariat. The move is usually used instead of charging toward an opponent to build up momentum for an attack, often the discus spin is used to evade incoming attacks.

=== Handspring ===
The wrestler runs toward the ropes and performs a handstand right next to them, using their momentum to throw their legs against the ropes, springing backward onto their feet, and using the momentum still to leap backward, usually to deliver an attack. A back elbow strike variation is the most common. Another common variation of the handspring transition sees the attacking wrestler Irish-whip their opponent onto a turnbuckle from an adjacent corner. Once the opponent crashes with their back onto the turnbuckle, the wrestler immediately performs a handspring combo toward the opponent across the ring. The acrobatic combination usually consists of a cartwheel followed by one or two back-tucks, leaving the wrestler's back facing the opponent. When the wrestler is in close range of the opponent, they are free to use the momentum of the handspring combination to leap backward and strike with any convenient attack.

=== High-impact ===
Sometimes abbreviated to "Hi-impact", this term defines any attack performed by a charging wrestler with enough speed and momentum that once started it cannot be stopped. The opponents receiving such attacks can be against the ropes/turnbuckle, lying on the mat or even trying to perform an attack against the charging wrestler themselves.

=== Leapfrog ===
Named after the children's game, an evasion maneuver that sees a wrestler standing in front of an incoming opponent as they leap upward, performing a split, so the opponent's onrush misses. It can also be employed to set up an attack. In WWE, this move is commonly used by Bobby Lashley.

=== Matrix ===
This is an evasion performed by bending over backward into a bridging position to counter any clothesline, punch, etc. This is named after The Matrix film series, as it is performed similarly to when Neo, in the movies, avoids a string of bullets.

=== Pendulum ===
This is a move in which a wrestler performs a tilting sequence, similar to that of an actual pendulum, in between the ring ropes (usually near a ringpost) in order to gain momentum to perform an attack or a counterattack. The usual move was the clothesline or a lariat notably used by wrestlers such as Jon Moxley and Kyle O'Reilly.

==== Tiger feint ====
A variation of the pendulum, this move sees a wrestler jump through the second and top rope while holding on to the ropes, using the momentum to swing back around into the ring. The move was originally performed as a fake dive to make opponents and fans think that the wrestler was about to dive through the ropes to opponents outside of the ring. The variation that ends with a kick to an opponent draped over the second rope was popularized internationally by Rey Mysterio, who called the move 619, while Ilja Dragunov uses a variation that transitions into a lariat, referring to it as the Constantine Special.

=== Rolling Thunder ===
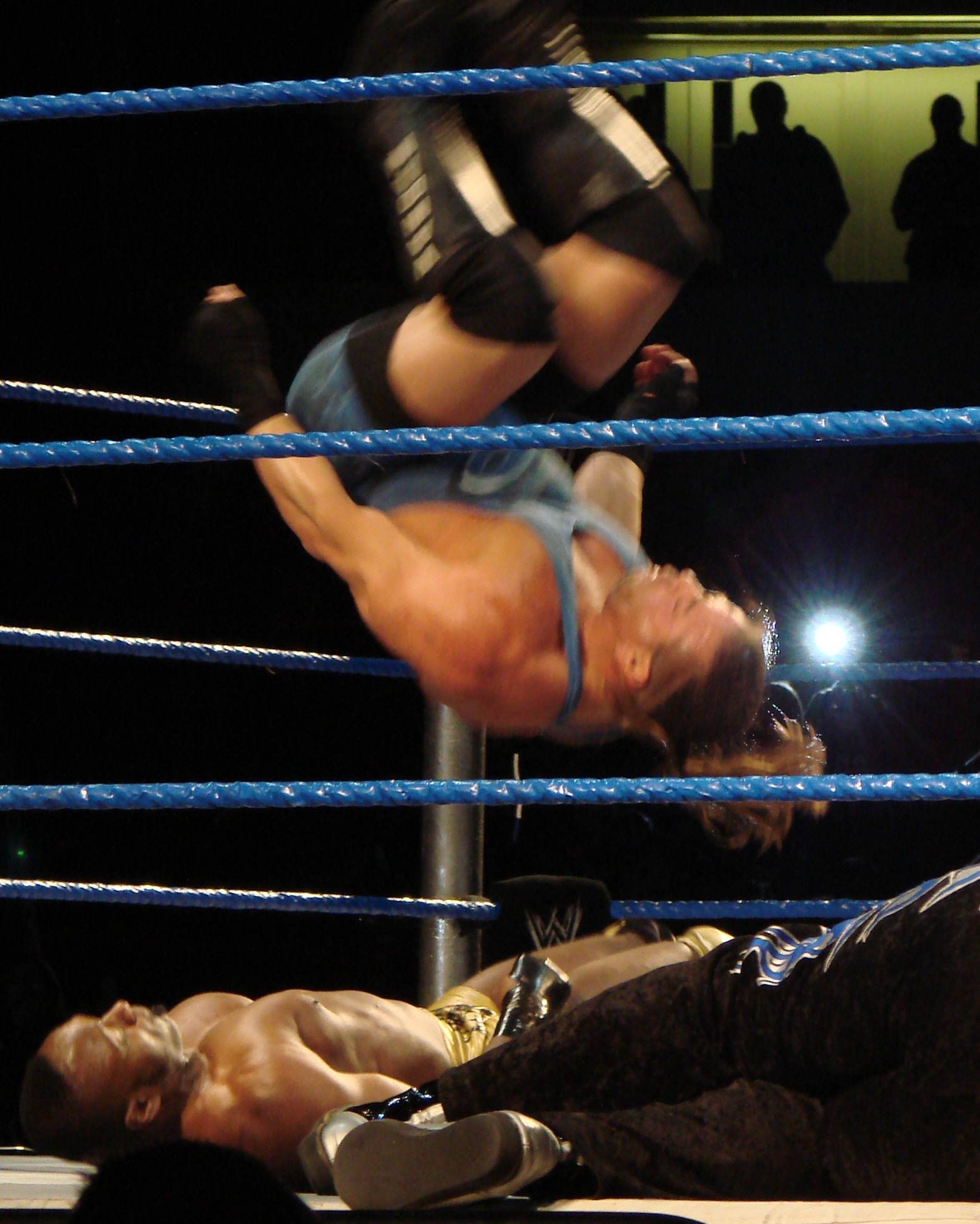
Rob Van Dam performing Rolling Thunder on Marcus Cor Von

A rolling thunder refers to the action of a forward roll toward an opponent using the complete rotation to spring up onto their feet and into the air and perform an attack. The most popular version of this ends it with a jumping somersault senton. Rob Van Dam popularized this move.

=== Short-arm ===
This transitioning maneuver is a set up for a short ranged attack, performed by Irish-whipping the opponent, but holding onto the wrist. When the held arm is completely extended, the wrestler pulls the opponent back and strikes them with the free arm. Alternatively, the Irish whip is used instead of or replaced by an arm wrench or a wrist lock, or by simply grabbing a hold of one of the opponent's wrists with one of the wrestler's hands, pulling it toward themselves and striking with their spare arm or going for a hold or sweep.

==== Ripcord ====
A variation of the short-arm, this transitioning maneuver begins with the attacking wrestler behind the opponent as they grab one of their wrists with their opposite hand (grabbing the opponent's right wrist with their left hand, and vice versa). They then spin the opponent around while still maintaining their grip on the opponent, so that both wrestlers are facing one another. From there, the attacking wrestler pulls the opponent toward them and strikes as in a normal short-arm.

=== Skin the cat ===
This defensive maneuver is used when a wrestler is thrown over the top rope. While being thrown over, the wrestler grabs the top rope with both hands and holds on so that they end up dangling from the top rope but not landing on the apron or floor. The wrestler then proceeds to lift their legs over their head and rotates their body back toward the ring to go back over the top rope and into the ring, landing in the ring on their feet. The wrestler can also perform a head scissor hold or a type of kick to strike an opponent on the inside to throw them over. A wrestler may deploy this tactic in a Royal Rumble or Battle Royal match to save themself from being eliminated, or to set up another springboard maneuver or a top rope maneuver in a normal match. This move was made famous by Ricky "The Dragon" Steamboat and Shawn Michaels.

== Illegal attacks ==
In kayfabe, any attack meant to incapacitate or disable an opponent is theoretically an offense punishable by disqualification in regular singles or team matches. Typically performed when the referee is disabled or otherwise distracted. Most of these attacks are legal in hardcore or no-disqualification matches.

=== Cheap shots ===
Mainly used by heels. Often, wrestlers will perform these strikes while the referee is in some way distracted. In Lucha libre, this is referred to as a "fault" or "foul". The most well-known illegal moves are those that attack the groin of a male wrestler.

==== Back rake ====
The attacking wrestler drags both hands' stiff fingers down the opponent's back to cause pain with his fingernails.

==== Biting ====
The wrestler seizes a body part of the opponent and bites down with their teeth. Biting is often used when a wrestler is "trapped", either in a corner of the ring or in a submission hold, as a desperation move.

==== Eye poke ====
Also called a thumb to the eye. When a wrestler pokes their thumb or finger(s) into an opponent's eye(s).

==== Eye rake ====
When a wrestler moves their hand down past an opponent's eye(s), making it appear that the wrestler has dragged their fingers across the opponent's eye(s), to cause pain and visual problems.

==== Hair pull ====
As the name implies, this move sees one wrestler take advantage of another's long hair by pulling it. In modern mainstream wrestling, it is more commonly used by female wrestlers. Similarly to a submission hold in the ropes, or a choke, the wrestler is given a five count to stop, before being disqualified.

==== Hangman ====
Commonly referred to as a "hotshot", the move is seen when a wrestler who is on the opposite side of the ring ropes from an opponent grabs the opponent by the head and drops down, forcing the opponent's throat across the ropes. Another common variation is done to the opponent's arm. This is an illegal attack because of its use of the rope. A common variation sees the wrestler perform a catapult to the opponent while the opponent is lying down in between the bottom and second ropes.

===== Reverse hangman =====
Similar to the normal hangman, which sees the wrestler standing outside the ring or on the apron, grabs the back of the opponent's head or neck (who is lying against the set of ropes, facing to the inside of the ring) into the ropes. The move can be alternatively called a "reverse" hotshot.

==== Low blow ====
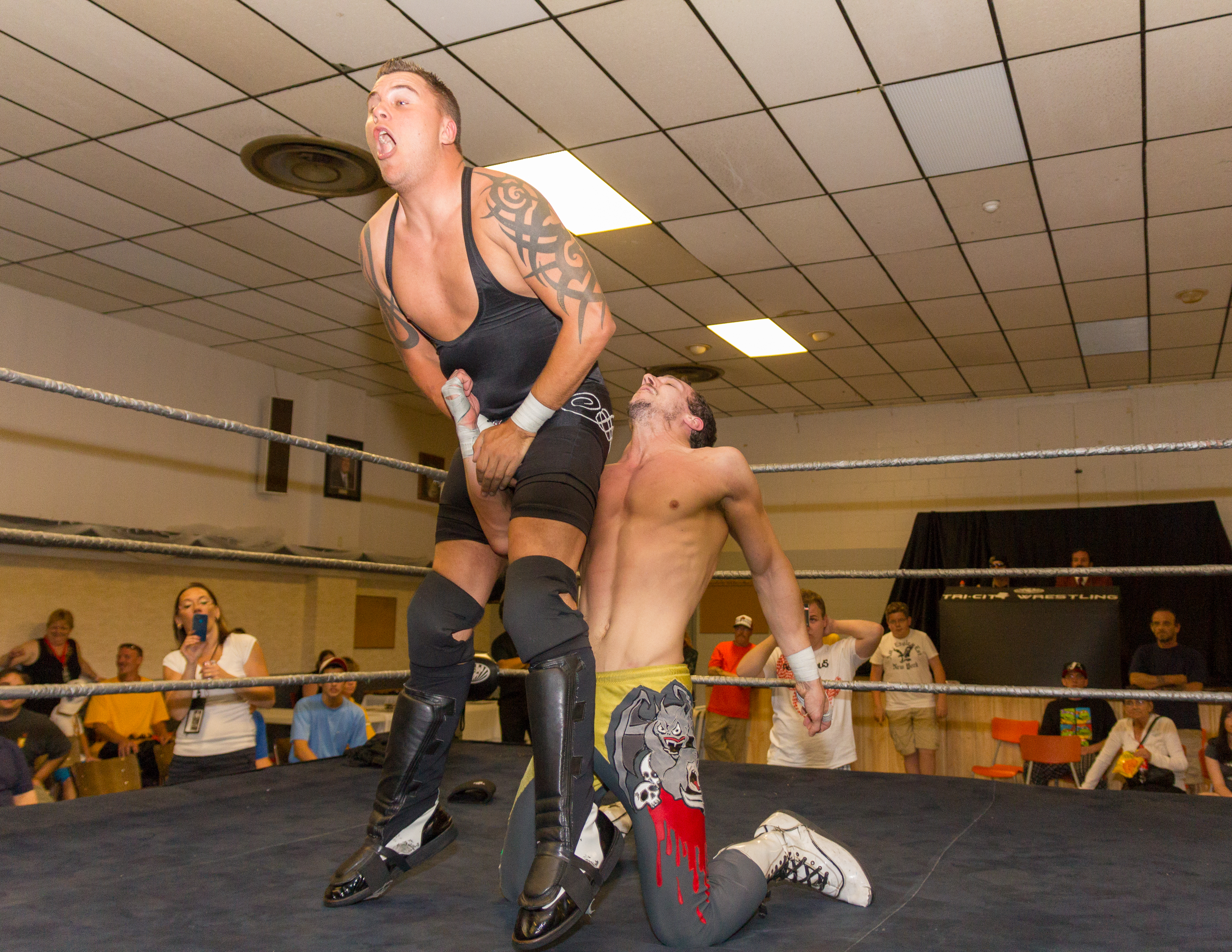
Anthony Darko (kneeling) delivering a low blow to K.C. Andrews

A direct shot to the groin of an opponent; otherwise known as a groin attack, utilized by heel wrestlers such as Ric Flair and Jerry Lawler. It is an offense punishable by disqualification. This illegal attack is mainly used by heel superstars or valets to gain the upper hand on their male opponents. Although kicking an opponent in the groin is the most obvious method, the most popular version sees an attacking wrestler drop to their knees and raise their arm up between the opponent's legs, striking the groin with the inside of their elbow-joint. Shinsuke Nakamura, Seth Rollins, Toru Yano and Daniel Bryan are other wrestlers who use the move.

Veteran wrestler Dustin Rhodes uses a unique version of this move as a finisher called Shattered Dreams. He begins by placing the dazed opponent into the corner, straddling both their legs across the middle ropes and seating them onto the second turnbuckle. The opponent often places both arms on the tope rope and their back against the top turnbuckle as they remain seated trying to recover as Dustin moves away from them to create space. He then charges forward to kick the second turnbuckle upward and into the opponent's groin causing damage. He often used this move when the referee was distracted or knocked out. In other cases, an obvious loophole by the very nature of the move would allow it to be exploited as it Dustin doesn't kick the opponent in the groin directly thus avoiding a DQ loss.

=== Foreign objects ===
Many items are used as weapons in professional wrestling. Some of the more common weapons used include chairs, guitars, folding tables, lifting belts, title belts, "kendo sticks", trash cans and bells. While picking up the upper half of the ring steps for use as a weapon is illegal, slamming an opponent into the ring steps is not considered illegal, though it is frowned upon.

==== Asian/ Poison mist ====
The illegal maneuver of spitting a colored liquid into the face of an opponent in professional wrestling. After doing so, the opponent will (in storyline) be blinded and experience intense stinging in the eyes. Asian mist can come in almost any color, but the most common one used is green. This was invented by The Great Kabuki and popularized by The Great Muta, Tajiri, and Bushi.

==== Chair shot ====
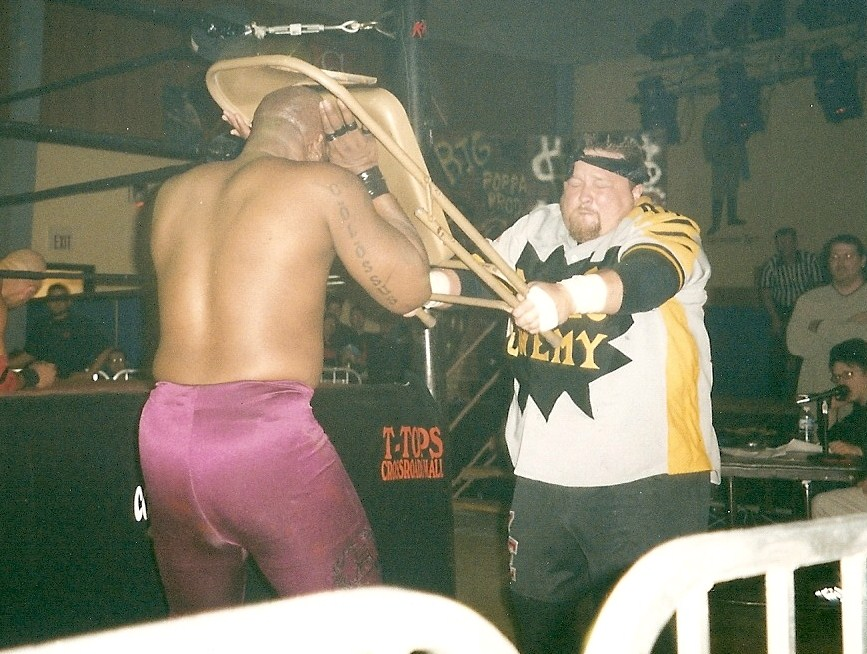
Johnny Grunge delivering a chair shot

A wrestler hits the opponent with a chair. In modern wrestling, folding chairs are used with the strike being performed with the flat face of the chair to slow the swing and distribute the impact, to prevent injury. Although chair shots to the body are legal in the WWE, chair shots to the head were banned in March 2010, due to high risk of concussion and long-term brain damage. AEW wrestler Shawn Spears executed a chair shot to the head of Cody at Fyter Fest in 2019, causing AEW to ban the move as well.

===== Con-chair-to =====
This particular attack was popularized by Edge and Christian and involved two wrestlers sandwiching an opponent's head between two chairs with a simultaneous chair shot from both sides. The "One Man Con-chair-to" involves a wrestler placing their opponent so that they are horizontal with their head resting on a chair, then hitting their head from above with a second chair, squashing the head of the opponent between both. A variant where the performing wrestler places the opponent's arm on or trapped with the chair is also possible.

==== Fireball ====
The wrestler (using a concealed lighter) lights a piece of flash paper or a firecracker and throws it at the opponent, giving the impression of a supernatural ball of fire emerging from their hand. Other variation sets a wrestler spitting a flammable substance (e.g., alcohol) onto a lighter or torch. The move was used by Karrion Kross and Scarlett Bordeaux during their run in NXT. It was used by Chris Jericho during his run with the Jericho Appreciation Society in All Elite Wrestling.

== See also ==
- Professional wrestling holds
- Professional wrestling throws
- Professional wrestling aerial techniques
- Professional wrestling double-team maneuvers
