= Worm (dance move) =

Dance move

Man performs the worm at a Depths of Wikipedia live show

The worm is a dance motion associated with breakdancing and "funk" subculture, also referred to as the centipede, the caterpillar or the dolphin, or also erroneously the snake or the wave (names of other breakdance moves). In this move a subject lies prone position and undulates the body, creating a wave reminiscent of earthworm locomotion. This can be done either forward or backwards, by shifting weight from the upper body to the lower body (backwards) or vice versa for forwards. The motion begins by pushing off from the ground with one's hands to start a ripple.

The worm was performed at shows in the 1970s and was popularized widely during the 1980s "funk" period, and continues to be associated with breakdancing.
