= Ōdō Tournament =

Japanese professional wrestling tournament

Ōdō Tournament (王道トーナメント, Ōdō Tōnamento; "King's Road Tournament") is a professional wrestling tournament held annually by All Japan Pro Wrestling (AJPW) since 2013. The single-elimination tournament is a spiritual successor to the Open Championship tournament, which was held in 1975. Typically, the winner of the tournament earns a future match for the Triple Crown Heavyweight Championship.

== History ==
On July 30, 2013, All Japan Pro Wrestling (AJPW) announced a new single-elimination tournament, set to take place the following September. Masanobu Fuchi, advisor to the AJPW board of directors, announced that the tournament was open to both Japanese and foreign wrestlers regardless of their weight divisions. This sets it apart from AJPW's top tournament, the Champion Carnival, which is generally exclusive to heavyweight wrestlers. Since its inception, the tournament has been subtitled "Open Championship", which was a similar openweight tournament held by AJPW in 1975. In the spirit of keeping the new tournament different from the Champion Carnival, the elimination format was set for use (the 1975 tournament was round-robin, as opposed to the Carnival which at the time was by elimination). Fuchi hailed Ōdō Tournament as the start of AJPW's rebirth, coming in the heels of a mass exodus of wrestlers that led to the formation of the Wrestle-1 promotion. The winner of the tournament, if not already the reigning champion, will become the number one contender to the Triple Crown Heavyweight Championship.

=== List of winners ===
No tournament was held in 2020 due to the COVID-19 pandemic.

| Year | Winner | Total won | Ref. |
|---|---|---|---|
| 2013 | Akebono | 1 | |
| 2014 | Go Shiozaki | 1 | |
| 2015 | Jun Akiyama | 1 | |
| 2016 | Suwama | 1 | |
| 2017 | Suwama | 2 | |
| 2018 | Kento Miyahara | 1 | |
| 2019 | Jake Lee | 1 | |
| 2021 | Suwama | 3 | |
| 2022 | Kento Miyahara | 2 | |
| 2023 | Satoshi Kojima | 1 | |
| 2024 | Ren Ayabe | 1 | |
| 2025 | Kento Miyahara | 3 | |
| 2026 | Ryuki Honda | 1 | |

== 2013 ==
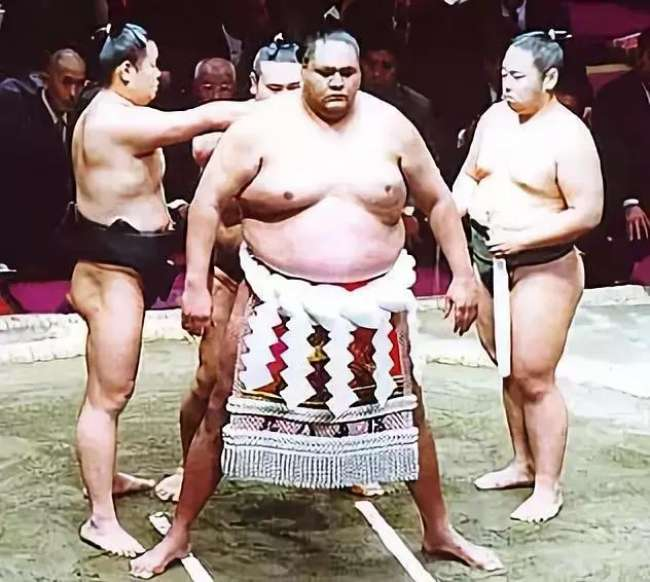
Akebono, the winner of the 2013 Ōdō Tournament

The 2013 Ōdō Tournament took place between September 11 and 23 and featured sixteen wrestlers. The participants and brackets were revealed on August 11. Included were the reigning Triple Crown Heavyweight Champion Suwama and four outside wrestlers; Mexican AAA representative Dark Cuervo, American freelancers D'Lo Brown and Low Ki and Austrian freelancer Bambi Killer. As part of the openweight nature of the tournament, Atsushi Aoki, Kotaro Suzuki and World Junior Heavyweight Champion Yoshinobu Kanemaru from AJPW's junior heavyweight division also entered the tournament. The tournament marked the first tour under an AJPW contract for longtime freelancer Akebono, who signed his contract on September 1. On September 15, Suwama, the reigning Triple Crown Heavyweight Champion, was eliminated from the tournament in the second round by his former Last Revolution tag team partner Joe Doering. After being eliminated from the tournament on September 16 by Akebono, Low Ki was sidelined for the rest of his AJPW tour with an abdominal injury. The injury eventually led to Low Ki announcing his retirement from professional wrestling on October 14 due to AJPW supposedly not honoring their contractual obligation of medical care. He, however, returned to the ring the following summer. On September 23, Akebono defeated Go Shiozaki in the finals of the tournament to become the first Ōdō Tournament winner. Following the win, Akebono went on to defeat Suwama on October 27 to win the Triple Crown Heavyweight Championship for the first time.

First round (September 11, 14)
Akebono | Pin
Jun Akiyama | 11:45
Low Ki | Pin
Dark Cuervo | 08:27
Bambi Killer | Pin
Kenso | 13:24
Takao Omori | Pin
Atsushi Aoki | 09:59
Go Shiozaki | Pin
Kotaro Suzuki | 18:36
Yoshinobu Kanemaru | Pin
D'Lo Brown | 07:26
Joe Doering | Pin
Sushi | 03:47
Suwama | Pin
Kento Miyahara | 19:45

Second round (September 15, 16, 17)
Akebono | Pin
Low Ki | 07:03
Bambi Killer | Pin
Takao Omori | 13:12
Go Shiozaki | Pin
Yoshinobu Kanemaru | 14:32
Joe Doering | Pin
Suwama | 12:18

Semifinals (September 19, 21)
Akebono | Pin
Bambi Killer | 06:13
Go Shiozaki | Pin
Joe Doering | 15:03

Finals (September 23)
Akebono | Pin
Go Shiozaki | 17:40

== 2014 ==
The 2014 Ōdō Tournament took place between September 15 and 28 and featured sixteen wrestlers. The participants and brackets were revealed on August 17. Included were the reigning Triple Crown Heavyweight Champion Joe Doering, the defending Ōdō Tournament winner Akebono and one qualifying match, set for August 30 between Sushi and Yohei Nakajima. Joe Doering, the reigning Triple Crown Heavyweight Champion, was eliminated from the tournament in his first round match on September 15 by Go Shiozaki, while veteran wrestler and AJPW's new president Jun Akiyama, for the second year in a row, was also eliminated in his first round match by Kento Miyahara. Akebono, the defending Ōdō Tournament winner, was eliminated from the tournament in the semifinals on September 22 by Suwama. On September 28, Shiozaki defeated Suwama in the finals to win the second Ōdō Tournament. Shiozaki received his shot at the Triple Crown Heavyweight Championship on October 29, but was defeated by Doering.

First round (September 15, 18)
Jun Akiyama | Pin
Kento Miyahara | 15:39
Yoshinobu Kanemaru | Pin
Hikaru Sato | 14:00
Sushi | Pin
Zeus | 10:06
Go Shiozaki | Pin
Joe Doering | 19:48
Suwama | Sub
Atsushi Aoki | 15:57
The Bodyguard | Pin
Takao Omori | 14:01
Kotaro Suzuki | Pin
Kenso | 09:24
Yutaka Yoshie | Pin
Akebono | 07:26

Second round (September 20, 21)
Kento Miyahara | Pin
Yoshinobu Kanemaru | 12:20
Zeus | Pin
Go Shiozaki | 19:23
Suwama | Pin
Takao Omori | 20:26
Kotaro Suzuki | Pin
Akebono | 10:49

Semifinals (September 22)
Kento Miyahara | Pin
Go Shiozaki | 17:08
Suwama | Sub
Akebono | 08:24

Finals (September 28)
Go Shiozaki | Pin
Suwama | 29:55

== 2015 ==
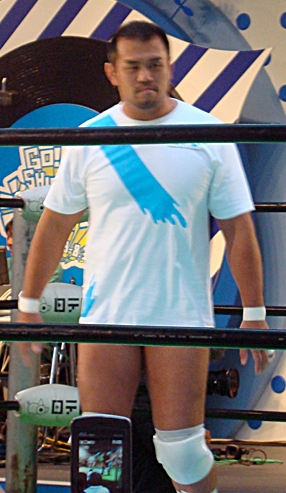
Jun Akiyama, the winner of the 2015 Ōdō Tournament

The 2015 Ōdō Tournament took place between September 10 and 26 and featured sixteen wrestlers. The participants were revealed on August 24. Included were the reigning Triple Crown Heavyweight Champion and 2013 Ōdō Tournament winner Akebono, reigning World Tag Team Champion and 2014 Ōdō Tournament winner Go Shiozaki, his championship partner Kento Miyahara and debuting outsiders Shuji Ishikawa and Yuji Hino. Tournament brackets were revealed on August 29. Jun Akiyama, the president of AJPW, won the tournament, defeating Akebono in the finals on September 26.

First round (September 10, 12, 13, 14)
Akebono | Pin
Bodyguard | 09:33
Hikaru Sato | Pin
Suwama | 14:29
Kento Miyahara | Pin
Yutaka Yoshie | 15:00
Takao Omori | Pin
Shuji Ishikawa | 13:31
Yuji Hino | Pin
Zeus | 11:26
Yoshinobu Kanemaru | Pin
Kenso | 14:19
Atsushi Aoki | Pin
Kotaro Suzuki | 16:08
Jun Akiyama | Pin
Go Shiozaki | 08:20

Second round (September 16, 19, 20, 24)
Akebono | DQ
Suwama | 16:39
Kento Miyahara | Pin
Shuji Ishikawa | 15:03
Yuji Hino | Pin
Yoshinobu Kanemaru | 11:39
Atsushi Aoki | Pin
Jun Akiyama | 17:20

Semifinals (September 26)
Akebono | Pin
Shuji Ishikawa | 06:42
Yuji Hino | Pin
Jun Akiyama | 12:42

Finals (September 26)
Akebono | Pin
Jun Akiyama | 08:46

== 2016 ==
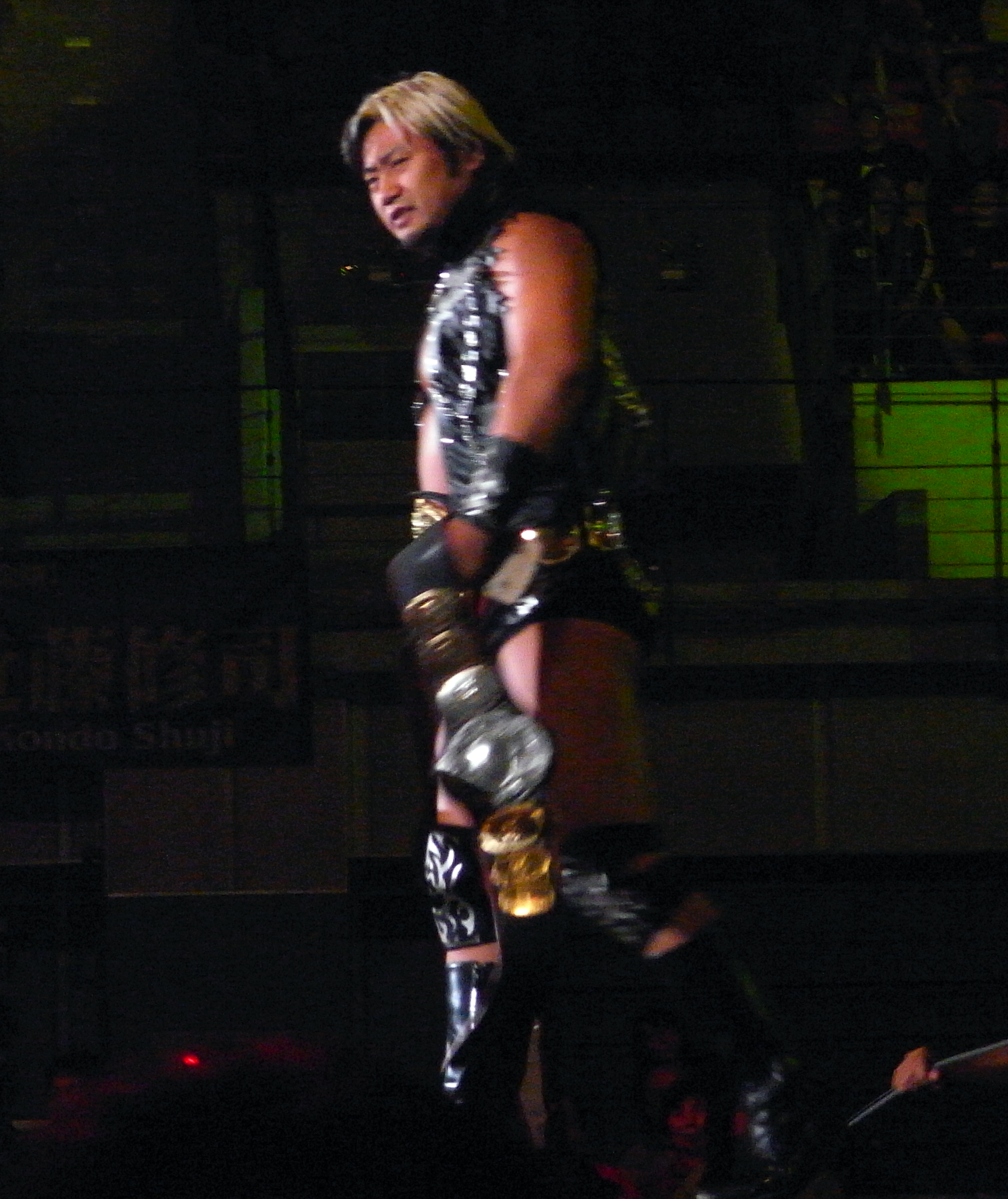
Suwama, the winner of the 2016 Ōdō Tournament

The 2016 Ōdō Tournament took place between September 4 and 19. The participants were revealed on August 6. Included were the reigning Triple Crown Heavyweight Champion Kento Miyahara, the 2015 Ōdō Tournament winner Jun Akiyama, reigning World Junior Heavyweight and All Asia Tag Team Champion Hikaru Sato and four debuting outsiders; Kendo Kashin, Mitsuya Nagai, Ryoji Sai and Taishi Takizawa. On September 19, Suwama defeated Zeus in the finals to win the tournament.

First round (September 4)
Zeus | Pin
Bodyguard | 09:49
Jake Lee | Pin
Ryoji Sai | 08:22
Hikaru Sato | Sub
Mitsuya Nagai | 11:57
Jun Akiyama | Pin
Takao Omori | 13:45
Yuma Aoyagi | Sub
Kendo Kashin | 06:38
Atsushi Aoki | Pin
Yutaka Yoshie | 08:51
Naoya Nomura | Pin
Taishi Takizawa | 10:50
Kento Miyahara | Pin
Suwama | 18:56

Second round (September 17)
Zeus | Pin
Ryoji Sai | 18:51
Mitsuya Nagai | Pin
Jun Akiyama | 13:07
Kendo Kashin | Pin
Atsushi Aoki | 09:59
Taishi Takizawa | Pin
Suwama | 14:06

Semifinals (September 19)
Zeus | Pin
Jun Akiyama | 10:33
Kendo Kashin | Sub
Suwama | 08:10

Finals (September 19)
Zeus | Pin
Suwama | 25:36

== 2017 ==
The 2017 Ōdō Tournament took place between September 12 and 23. Jake Lee was scheduled to take part in the tournament, but was forced to pull out after suffering a knee injury. He was replaced by Kotaro Suzuki.

First round (September 12, 16)
Ryoji Sai | Pin
Zeus | 19:24
Shuji Ishikawa | Pin
Bodyguard | 06:51
Kento Miyahara | Pin
Kai | 19:22
Tajiri | Pin
Yoshitatsu | 09:28
Suwama | Pin
Naoya Nomura | 13:33
Koji Iwamoto | Pin
Yuma Aoyagi | 10:52
Kotaro Suzuki | Pin
Atsushi Aoki | 20:48
Hikaru Sato | Pin
Joe Doering | 04:14

Second round (September 18, 19)
Zeus | Pin
Shuji Ishikawa | 20:13
Kento Miyahara | Pin
Yoshitatsu | 19:13
Suwama | Pin
Koji Iwamoto | 13:05
Atsushi Aoki | Pin
Joe Doering | 13:51

Semifinals (September 23)
Shuji Ishikawa | Pin
Kento Miyahara | 13:41
Suwama | Sub
Joe Doering | 07:43

Finals (September 23)
Shuji Ishikawa | Pin
Suwama | 16:54

== 2018 ==
The 2018 Ōdō Tournament took place between September 15 and 24.

First round (September 15, 16, 17)
Ryoji Sai | Pin
Yuma Aoyagi | 11:38
Bodyguard | Pin
Yuji Hino | 07:28
Kento Miyahara | Pin
Yoshitatsu | 18:54
Jake Lee | Pin
Jun Akiyama | 10:06
Zeus | Pin
Naoya Nomura | 15:59
Gianni Valletta | Pin
Suwama | 10:43
Shuji Ishikawa | Stop
Kengo Mashimo | 11:23
Joe Doering | Pin
Dylan James | 11:49

Second round (September 21, 22)
Ryoji Sai | Pin
Yuji Hino | 12:15
Kento Miyahara | Pin
Jake Lee | 19:31
Suwama | Pin
Zeus | 15:56
Kengo Mashimo | Pin
Joe Doering | 9:48

Semifinals (September 24)
Yuji Hino | Pin
Kento Miyahara | 10:53
Zeus | Stop
Kengo Mashimo | 12:38

Finals (September 24)
Kento Miyahara | Pin
Kengo Mashimo | 23:47

== 2019 ==
The 2019 Ōdō Tournament took place between September 14 and 23.

First round (September 14, 15, 16)
Kento Miyahara | Pin
Joe Doering | 11:34
Jiro Kuroshio | Pin
Yoshitatsu | 12:00
Naoya Nomura | Pin
Sam Adonis | 15:41
Dylan James | Pin
Zeus | 14:59
Suwama | Pin
Jake Lee | 22:42
Yuma Aoyagi | Pin
Kai | 09:42
Gianni Valletta | Pin
Taishi Takizawa | 09:19
Ryoji Sai | Pin
Shuji Ishikawa | 22:16

Second round (September 18, 22)
Kento Miyahara | Pin
Jiro Kuroshio | 16:55
Naoya Nomura | Pin
Zeus | 22:45
Jake Lee | Pin
Kai | 17:27
Taishi Takizawa | Pin
Shuji Ishikawa | 13:57

Semifinals (September 23)
Kento Miyahara | Pin
Zeus | 11:05
Jake Lee | Stop
Shuji Ishikawa | 09:16

Finals (September 23)
Kento Miyahara | Pin
Jake Lee | 23:59

== 2021 ==
The 8th Ōdō Tournament took place between August 15 and 29.

First round August 15
Jake Lee | Pin
Sugi | 12:36
Koji Doi | 11:53
Koji Iwamoto | Sub
Ryuki Honda | 13:21
Hokuto Omori | Pin
Black Menso-re | 7:20
Ayato Yoshida | Pin
Takao Omori | 9:29
Atsuki Aoyagi | Pin
Devil Murasaki II | 2:54
Tajiri | Pin
Zeus | Sub
Seigo Tachibana | 6:41
Shotaro Ashino | Pin
Yuma Aoyagi | 16:46
Abdullah Kobayashi | Sub
Dan Tamura | 9:14
Rei Saito | 3:03
Suwama | Pin
Shigehiro Irie | Pin
Kuma Arashi | 11:13
Hikaru Sato | 8:24
Yoshitatsu | Sub
Kento Miyahara | Pin
Yusuke Kodama | 12:31
Rising Hayato | 10:37
T-Hawk | Pin
Shuji Ishikawa | Pin
Jun Saito | 4:21
Izanagi | 8:45
Francesco Akira | Pin

Second round August 18
Jake Lee | Pin
Koji Iwamoto | 13:21
Hokuto Omori | 7:34
Ayato Yoshida | Pin
Atsuki Aoyagi | Pin
Tajiri | 7:58
Zeus | 9:43
Shotaro Ashino | Sub
Abdullah Kobayashi | 10:23
Suwama | Sub
Shigehiro Irie | Pin
Yoshitatsu | 5:32
Kento Miyahara | Pin
T-Hawk | 14:15
Shuji Ishikawa | Pin
Francesco Akira | 5:05

Quarterfinals; August 24
Jake Lee | Pin
Ayato Yoshida | 14:32
Atsuki Aoyagi | 9:52
Shotaro Ashino | Pin
Suwama | TKO
Shigehiro Irie | 13:05
Kento Miyahara | Pin
Shuji Ishikawa | 22:06

Semifinals; August 29
Jake Lee | 9:34
Shotaro Ashino | Pin
Suwama | Sub
Kento Miyahara | 12:39

Finals; August 29
Shotaro Ashino | 21:57
Suwama | Pin

== 2022 ==
The 9th Ōdō Tournament took place between August 7 and 20.

First round (August 7, 11)
Kento Miyahara | Pin
Taru | 15:05
Shuji Ishikawa | Pin
Cyrus | 11:30
Shotaro Ashino | Sub
Dan Tamura | 10:05
Yoshitatsu | Pin
Yuji Nagata | 14:22
Takao Omori | Pin
Ryuki Honda | 6:48
Yuma Aoyagi | Pin
Naoya Nomura | 16:55
Takuya Nomura | Pin
Atsuki Aoyagi | 11:52
Ren Ayabe | Pin
Jake Lee | 11:54

Second round (August 14, 16)
Kento Miyahara | Pin
Cyrus | 7:02
Shotaro Ashino | Pin
Yuji Nagata | 14:21
Takao Omori | Sub
Naoya Nomura | 10:47
Takuya Nomura | Pin
Jake Lee | 15:14

Semifinals (August 20)
Kento Miyahara | Pin
Yuji Nagata | 10:48
Takao Omori* | Pin
Jake Lee | 05:46

Finals (August 20)
Kento Miyahara | Pin
Jake Lee | 22:04

* Naoya Nomura tested positive for COVID and was replaced by Takao Omori in the semi-finals.

== 2023 ==
The 10th Ōdō Tournament took place between August 19 and 27.

First round (August 19, 21)
Shuji Ishikawa | Pin
Ren Ayabe | 14:47
Kotaro Suzuki | Pin
Dan Tamura | 6:59
Takuya Nomura | Pin
Hokuto Omori | 10:35
Satoshi Kojima | Pin
Rei Saito | 9:41
Hayato Tamura | Pin
Jun Saito | 9:16
Suwama | Pin
Fuminori Abe | 0:24
Kento Miyahara | Pin
Atsuki Aoyagi | 12:21
Yuma Aoyagi | Pin
Ryuki Honda | 14:38

Second round (August 22)
Shuji Ishikawa | Pin
Dan Tamura | 14:21
Takuya Nomura | Pin
Satoshi Kojima | 9:17
Hayato Tamura | Sub
Suwama | 11:17
Kento Miyahara | Pin
Ryuki Honda | 16:57

Semifinals (August 27)
Shuji Ishikawa | 10:44
Satoshi Kojima | Pin
Suwama | Pin
Ryuki Honda | 7:28

Finals (August 27)
Satoshi Kojima | Pin
Ryuki Honda | 17:00

== 2024 ==
The 11th Ōdō Tournament took place between September 14 and 22.

First round (September 14, 15, 16)
Yuma Aoyagi | Pin
Ryuki Honda | 19:41
Dan Tamura | Pin
Shotaro Ashino | 13:49
Kento Miyahara | Pin
Hideki Suzuki | 21:42
Yuko Miyamoto | Pin
Joel Redman | 9:17
Yuma Anzai | Pin
Ren Ayabe | 20:24
Davey Boy Smith Jr. | Pin
Hokuto Omori | 10:45
Jun Saito | Pin
Cyrus | 10:55
Rei Saito | Pin
Kumaarashi | 13:09

Second round (September 19)
Ryuki Honda | Pin
Dan Tamura | 25:23
Kento Miyahara | Pin
Joel Redman | 14:29
Ren Ayabe | Pin
Davey Boy Smith Jr. | 15:57
Cyrus | Pin
Rei Saito | 10:51

Semifinals (September 22)
Ryuki Honda | Pin
Kento Miyahara | 11:16
Ren Ayabe | Sub
Rei Saito | 11:59

Finals (September 22)
Ryuki Honda | Pin
Ren Ayabe | 24:39

== 2025 ==
The 12th Ōdō Tournament took place between August 24, 2025 and September 15, 2025.

First round (August 24, 30, 31)
Jun Saito | 20:00
Ren Ayabe | Pin
Hokuto Omori | 9:18
Xyon | Pin
Shotaro Ashino | 20:07
Davey Boy Smith Jr. | Pin
Ryuki Honda | Pin
Kumaarashi | 15:04
Kento Miyahara | Pin
Kengo Mashimo | 21:06
Yuma Aoyagi | Pin
Naoya Nomura | 16:26
Daisuke Sekimoto | Pin
Naruki Doi | 6:43
Hideki Suzuki | 13:23
Oddyssey | Pin

Second round (September 3, 6)
Ren Ayabe | Pin
Xyon | 22:02
Davey Boy Smith Jr. | 15:50
Ryuki Honda | Pin
Kento Miyahara | Pin
Naoya Nomura | 20:38
Daisuke Sekimoto | Pin
Oddyssey | 10:30

Semifinals (September 15)
Ren Ayabe | 9:08
Ryuki Honda | Pin
Kento Miyahara | Pin
Daisuke Sekimoto | 5:07

Finals (September 15)
Ryuki Honda | Pin
Kento Miyahara | 16:11

== 2026 ==
The 13th Ōdō Tournament took place between September 9, 2026 and September 22, 2026.

First round (September 9, 12, 13)
Hideki Suzuki | 15:24
Timothy Thatcher | Sub
Rei Saito | 11:23
Yuma Anzai | Pin
Jun Saito | 20:20
Yuma Aoyagi | Pin
Shotaro Ashino | 13:18
Daisuke Sekimoto | Pin
Kento Miyahara | Pin
Hyo Ogawa | 10:54
Ryuki Honda | Pin
Kuma Arashi | 21:57
Xyon | Pin
Oddyssey | 11:18
Go Shiozaki | Pin
Ren Ayabe | 22:27

Second round (September 16, 17)
Timothy Thatcher | 16:06
Yuma Anzai | Pin
Yuma Aoyagi | Pin
Daisuke Sekimoto | 19:03
Kento Miyahara | 20:28
Ryuki Honda | Pin
Xyon | Pin
Go Shiozaki | 19:37

Semifinals (September 22)
Yuma Anzai | 21:38
Yuma Aoyagi | Pin
Ryuki Honda | Pin
Xyon | 9:06

Finals (September 22)
Yuma Aoyagi | 25:33
Ryuki Honda | Pin

== See also ==
- All Japan Pro Wrestling
- Champion Carnival
- King of DDT Tournament
- New Japan Cup
- Ryūkon Cup
- Wrestle-1 Grand Prix
