= Dan Tamura =

Japanese professional wrestler

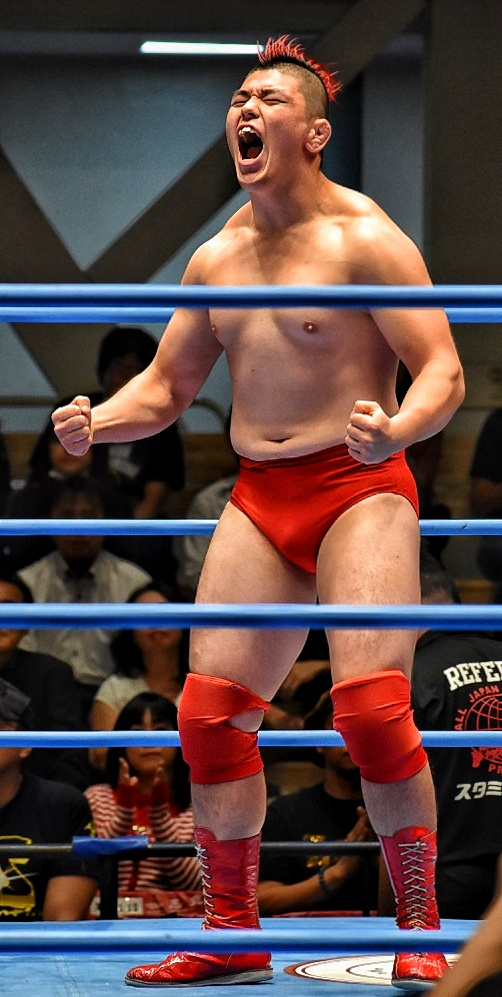
- Tamura in October 2019

Personal information
- Born: June 14, 1999 (age 27) Kashima, Ibaraki, Japan

Professional wrestling career
- Ring name(s): Urayasu no Danji-chan; Dan Tamura
- Billed height: 173 cm (5 ft 8 in)
- Billed weight: 83 kg (183 lb)
- Trained by: All Japan Pro Wrestling
- Debut: January 2, 2019

Dan Tamura (田村男児, Tamura Dan) is a Japanese professional wrestler. He currently wrestles for the Japanese promotion All Japan Pro Wrestling, where he is the current AJPW World Junior Heavyweight Champion in his second reign, a former two-time All Asia Tag Team Champion, and a former AJPW Six-Man Tag Team Champion with Hideki Suzuki and Suwama.

== Professional wrestling career ==
=== Japanese independent scene (2019–present) ===
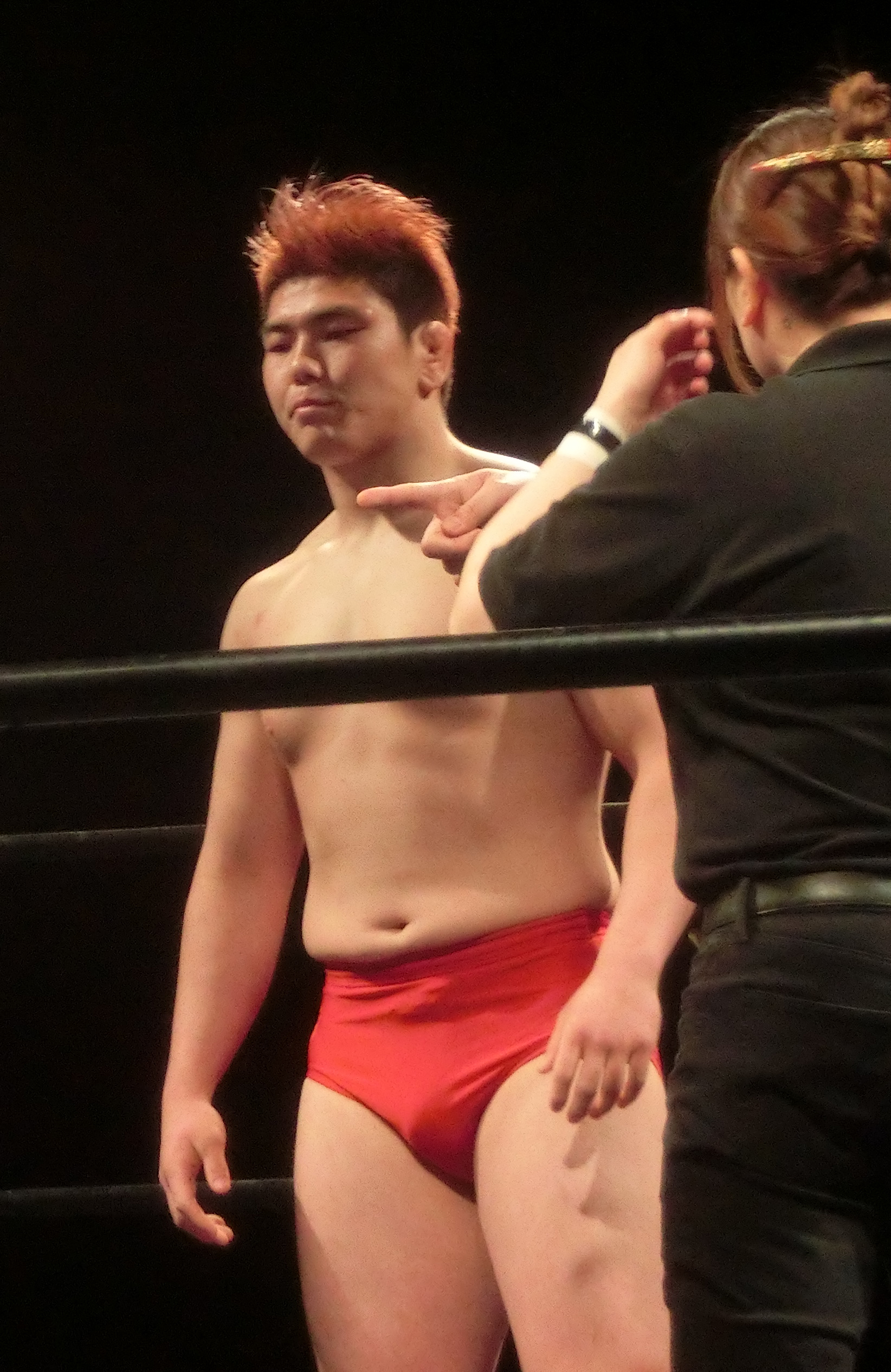
Tamura in June 2019

Tamura has competed for several promotions on the Japanese independent wrestling scene. On December 20, 2020, he participated in 2AW Infinity ~ 2020 Winter, an event promoted by Active Advance Pro Wrestling, where he lost to Tank Nagai in singles competition. At Pro Wrestling Zero1's Chikara Matsuri Special event, held on March 27, 2021, Tamura teamed up with Suwama to defeat Ryuki Honda and Shuji Ishikawa.

At the Korakuen Hall 60th Anniversary Festival, a crossover event hosted by New Japan Pro Wrestling on April 16, 2022 featuring All Japan Pro Wrestling talent, Tamura joined Runaway Suplex (Shotaro Ashino and Suwama) in a losing effort against Chaos (Hirooki Goto, Yoh and Yoshi-Hashi). At Gleat G PROWRESTLING Ver. 3 on September 25, 2022, Tamura teamed up with Hayato Tamura and Rising Hayato; the team lost to Abdullah Kobayashi, Kaz Hayashi and Yuji Okabayashi in a six-man tag team match.

=== All Japan Pro Wrestling (2019–present) ===
Tamura is best known for his tenure in All Japan Pro Wrestling. He made his debut on January 2, 2019, during the first night of AJPW New Year's Wars where he competed in a 15-man battle royal against Gianni Valletta, Atsushi Aoki, Masanobu Fuchi, Kotaro Suzuki, Osamu Nishimura, and eventual winner Jake Lee among others. He subsequently joined Atsuki Aoyagi in a tag-team match against Hikaru Sato and Atsushi Aoki, which the pair lost. At AJPW 50th Anniversary on September 18, 2022, Tamura and Hikrau Sato defeated Voodoo Murders (Minoru and Toshizo) to win the All Asia Tag Team Championship. At AJPW Summer Action Series on July 14, 2022, Tamura unsuccessfully challenged Tiger Mask for the World Junior Heavyweight Championship. On October 2, 2022, during the first night of the AJPW Raising An Army Memorial Series, Tamura unsuccessfully challenged Toshizo for the Gaora TV Championship.

Tamura has competed in many of the promotion's signature events, such as the AJPW Junior Tag League; he made his first appearance at the 2020 edition of the event, where he partnered with Hikaru Sato of the Evolution stable. The pair defeated Yu Iizuka and Tetsuya Izuchi in the first round, Enfants Terribles (Hokuto Omori and Yusuke Kodama) in the semifinals, and Atsuki Aoyagi and Raising Hayato in the finals on December 26 to win the tournament. At the 2021 edition of the event, he again joined Hikaru Sato; the pair defeated Black Menso~Re and Hiroshi Yamato in the first round and Atsuki Aoyagi and Yu Iizuka in the semifinals, before losing to Total Eclipse (Hokuto Omori and Yusuke Kodama) in the tournament finals on December 27.

On June 2, 2021, Tamura made an appearance at AJPW Junior League, where he lost to Tatsuhito Takaiwa in the first round of the event. Tamura also wrestled in the 2021 and 2022 editions of the Ōdō Tournament, where he fell short to Abdullah Kobayashi and Shotaro Ashino, respectively, in singles competition.

== Championships and accomplishments ==
- All Japan Pro Wrestling
  - World Junior Heavyweight Championship (2 times, current)
  - All Asia Tag Team Championship (2 times) – with Hikaru Sato
  - AJPW TV Six-Man Tag Team Championship (1 time) — with Hideki Suzuki and Suwama
  - AJPW Junior Tag League (2020) – with Hikaru Sato
  - Junior Battle of Glory (2023)
  - Asunaro Cup (2020)
- Pro Wrestling Illustrated
  - Ranked No. 228 of the top 500 singles wrestlers in the PWI 500 in 2024
- Tenryu Project
  - Tenryu Project United National Heavyweight Tag Team Championship (1 time) – with Suwama

== Submission grappling record ==
Result	Opponent	Method	Event	Date	Round	Time	Notes
Loss	(Japan) Hideki "Shrek" Sekine	Decision (unanimous)	Gleat MMA Ver.0	December 14, 2022	1	10:00	
