= Atsuki Aoyagi =

Japanese professional wrestler

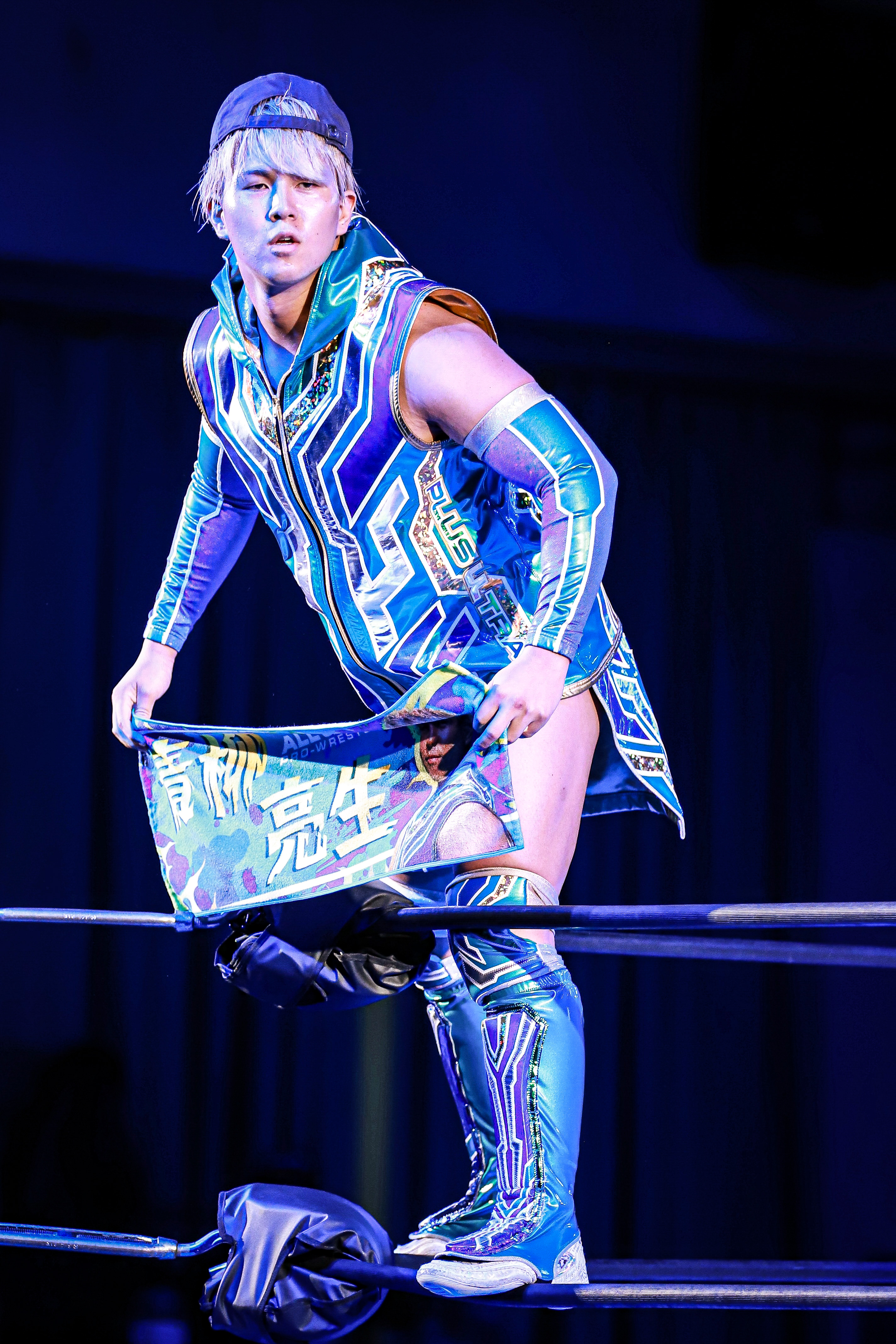
- Aoyagi in August 2023

Personal information
- Born: December 7, 1999 (age 26) Matsumoto, Japan
- Family: Yuma Aoyagi (brother)

Professional wrestling career
- Ring name: Atsuki Aoyagi
- Billed height: 175 cm (5 ft 9 in)
- Billed weight: 80 kg (176 lb)
- Trained by: Yuma Aoyagi; Jun Akiyama
- Debut: January 2, 2019

Atsuki Aoyagi (青柳亮生, Aoyagi Atsuki) is a Japanese professional wrestler, He is currently working for the Japanese promotion All Japan Pro Wrestling.

== Professional wrestling career ==
=== Japanese independent scene (2019-present) ===
Aoyagi seldomly competes for several promotions from the Japanese independent scene. At Gleat G PROWRESTLING Ver. 12 on December 8, 2021, he teamed up with Musashi, falling short to Coelacanths (Kaz Hayashi and Minoru Tanaka). At Pro Wrestling Zero1's 20th and 21st Anniversary event from April 10, 2022, he defeated Takumi Baba. At Korakuen Hall 60th Anniversary Festival, a cross-over event held by AJPW in partnership with New Japan Pro Wrestling on April 16, 2022, Aoyagi teamed up with Yuma Aoyagi and Great Bash Heel (Togi Makabe and Tomoaki Honma) in a losing effort against Los Ingobernables de Japon (Bushi, Hiromu Takahashi, Shingo Takagi and Tetsuya Naito).

=== All Japan Pro Wrestling (2019-present) ===
Aoyagi is best known for competing in All Japan Pro Wrestling, promotion in which he has also made his professional wrestling debut on January 2, 2019, on the first night of the AJPW New Year's Wars where he first competed in a 15-man battle royal won by Jake Lee and also involving notable opponents such as Gianni Valletta, Atsushi Aoki, Masanobu Fuchi, Hokuto Omori, Kotaro Suzuki and Osamu Nishimura, and secondly in a tag team match in which he paired up with Dan Tamura in a losing effort against Hikaru Sato and Atsushi Aoki. At AJPW Raising An Army Memorial Series 2021 on October 31, he teamed up with his "Nextream" stablemate Yuma Aoyagi to unsuccessfully challenge Strong Hearts (El Lindaman and T-Hawk) for the All Asia Tag Team Championship. On the seventh night of the 2021 World's Strongest Tag Determination League from November 28, Aoyagi unsuccessfully challenged Tajiri for the MLW World Middleweight Championship. At AJPW 50th Anniversary on September 18, 2022, Aoyagi defeated Tiger Mask to win the World Junior Heavyweight Championship.

Aoyagi is known for competing in various of the promotion's signature events such as the AJPW Junior Tag League, making his first appearance at the 2020 edition where he teamed up with Raising Hayato and defeated Black Menso~re and SUSHI in the first rounds, Jin (Koji Iwamoto and Fuminori Abe) in the semifinals, but fell short to Evolution (Dan Tamura and Hikaru Sato) in the finals, all matches taking place on December 27. At the 2021 edition of the tournament, Aoyagi teamed up with Yu Iizuka to defeat Takayuki Ueki and Seigo Tachibana in the first rounds but fell short to Dan Tamura and Hikaru Sato again in the semifinals on December 26. Another competition for which he is known to evolve in is the AJPW Junior League, making his first appearance at the 2021 edition where he fell short to Sugi in the first rounds from June 2. As for the Ōdō Tournament, Aoyagi made his first appearance at the 2022 edition where he fell short to Takuya Nomura in the first rounds from August 7.

== Personal life ==
His brother Yuma Aoyagi is a fellow professional wrestler and was also one of his trainers.

== Championships and accomplishments ==
- All Japan Pro Wrestling
  - World Junior Heavyweight Championship (3 times)
  - All Asia Tag Team Championship (2 times) – with Yuma Aoyagi (1) and Rising Hayato (1)
  - Jr. Battle of Glory (2022, 2025)
  - Zennichi Junior Festival (2025)
  - January 2 Korakuen Hall Openweight Battle Royal (2025)
- Pro Wrestling Illustrated
  - Ranked No. 122 of the top 500 singles wrestlers in the PWI 500 in 2023
- Tenryu Project
  - Tenryu Project United National Heavyweight Tag Team Championship (1 time) – with Yuma Aoyagi
