= Ognibene =

Ognibene is a surname. Notable people with the surname include:

- Carl Malenko (born Carl Ognibene, 1970), American wrestler and mixed martial arts fighter
- Tom Ognibene (1943–2015), American politician
