= Rising Hayato =

Japanese professional wrestler

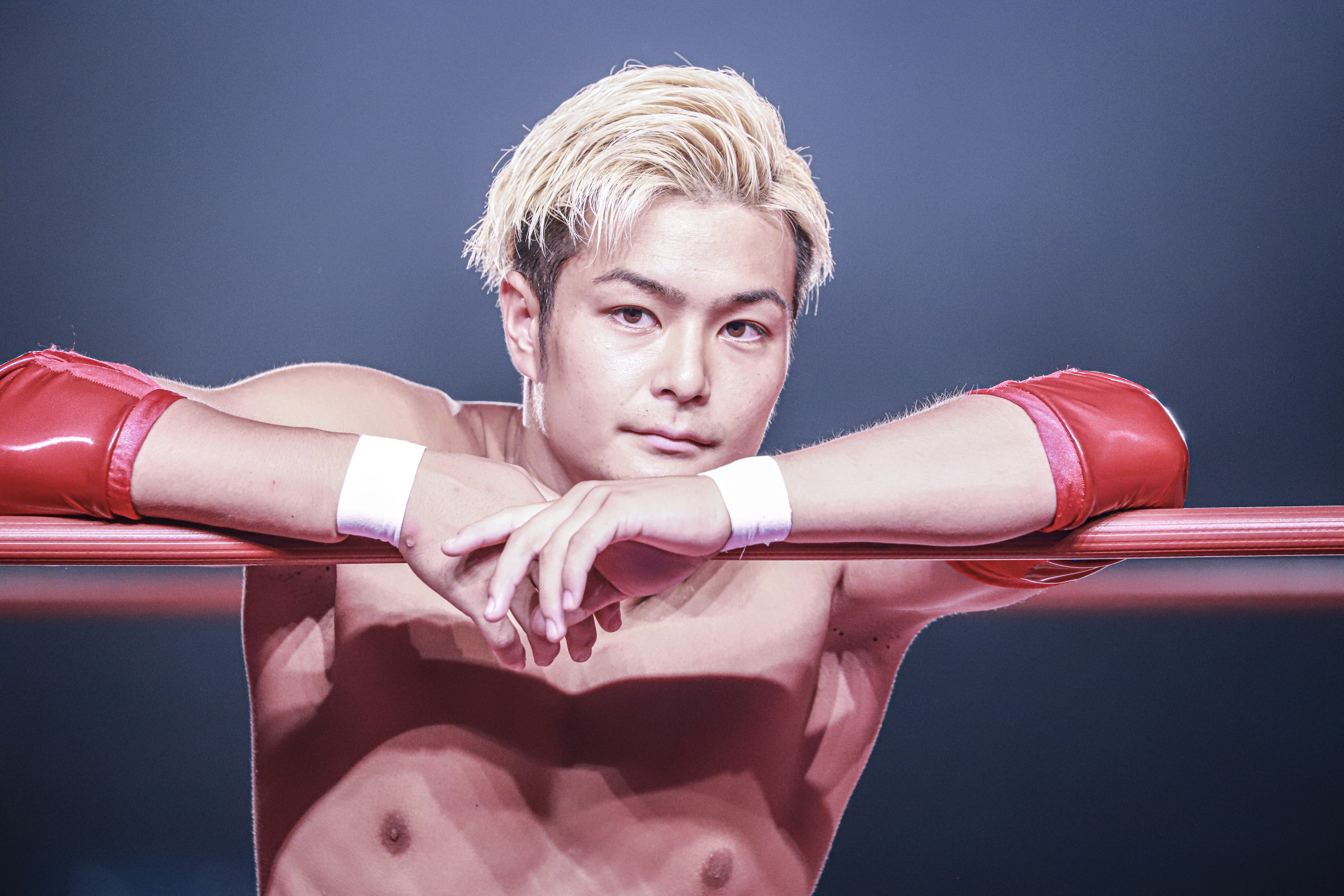
- Hayato in July 2022

Personal information
- Born: Hayato Kubo; February 24, 1999 (age 27) Matsuyama, Japan

Professional wrestling career
- Ring name: Rising Hayato
- Billed height: 177 cm (5 ft 10 in)
- Billed weight: 85 kg (187 lb)
- Trained by: Masayuki Mitomi; Psycho
- Debut: 2016

Hayato Kubo (久保颯人, Kubo Hayato; born February 24, 1999), better known by his ring name Rising Hayato (ライジングHAYATO, Raijingu Hayato) is a Japanese professional wrestler, He is currently working for the Japanese promotion All Japan Pro Wrestling.

== Professional wrestling career ==
=== Independent circuit (2016–present) ===
Hayato started his professional wrestling career in the Japanese independent scene, more specifically at Pro Young Master 06, an event promoted by Dotonbori Pro Wrestling on September 16, 2017, where he fell short to Takato Nakao in the "Young Master Cup". He soon began chasing opportunities to work for many other promotions. Hayato made an appearance on the third night of the 2018 edition of Pro Wrestling Noah's N-1 Victory from November 11, not as part of the tournament, but in a side tag team match where he teamed up with Yoshiki Inamura, Kaito Kiyomiya and Katsuhiko Nakajima in a losing effort against Hi69, Minoru Tanaka, Mohammed Yone and Takashi Sugiura. At Freedoms Pro-Wrestling Sengoku-Jidai, an event produced by Takashi Sasaki on the behalf of Pro Wrestling Freedoms on December 26, 2017, Hayato teamed up with Asosan and Tsuchiya Crazy, falling short to Gentaro, Mammoth Sasaki and Toru Sugiura as a result of a six-man tag team match.

=== DDT Pro-Wrestling (2018–2019) ===
Hayato shared a short-term affiliation with DDT Pro-Wrestling. He made his first appearance at DDT DNA 42, an event promoted on March 7, 2018, where he teamed up with Mao and defeated Rekka and Choun Shiryu in the first rounds of the "DNA Super Tag Tournament". At DNA 43 on April 5, 2018, Hayato teamed up with Mao again and fell short to Naomi Kingdom (Akira Jo and Naomi Yoshimura) in the semifinals of the tournament. His last known appearance took place at DDT Wrestle Matsuyamania 2019 on June 2, where he teamed up with Sanshiro Takagi, Yoshiaki Yatsu and Yukio Naya in a losing effort against All Out (Akito, Konosuke Takeshita, Shunma Katsumata) and Tatsumi Fujinami as a result of en eight man tag team match.

=== All Japan Pro Wrestling (2019–present) ===
Hayato made his first appearance in All Japan Pro Wrestling on the eighth night of the Super Power Series 2019 from June 1 where he teamed up with Carbell Ito and Jun Akiyama to defeat Atsuki Aoyagi, Black Menso-re and Bonjin Pulp in the semifinals of a "Six Man Tag Tournament". In the finals which took place on the same night, Hayato and his teammates defeated Hokuto Omori, Kentaro Yoshida and Takao Omori. During time, Hayato challenged for various championships promoted by the company. On the second night of the AJPW Dream Power Series 2021 from March 8, Hayato teamed up with his "Nextream" stablemate Atsuki Aoyagi and unsuccessfully challenged Purple Haze (Izanagi and Zeus for the All Asia Tag Team Championship. On the first night of the 2022 AJPW New Year Wars from January 2, Hayato won the traditional battle royal which also involved notable opponents such as Andy Wu, Baliyan Akki, Shuji Ishikawa, Shigehiro Irie, Yoshitatsu, Kazuhiro Tamura and others. On the final night of the event from January 23, he unsuccessfully challenged Sugi for the AJPW World Junior Heavyweight Championship.

Hayato is known for competing in various of the promotion's signature events such as the AJPW Junior Tag League, making his first appearance at the 2020 edition of the event where he teamed up with Atsuki Aoyagi and defeated Black Menso-re and Sushi in the first rounds, Jin (Koji Iwamoto and Fuminori Abe) in the semifinals, but fell short to Evolution (Dan Tamura and Hikaru Sato) in the finals from December 27. Another major event in which Hayato competed is the AJPW Junior League, event where he marked his first appearance at the 2021 edition where he fell short to El Lindaman in the first rounds from June 2. At the 2022 edition, Hayato fought in a single-block tournament and competed against Hikaru Sato, Ryo Inoue, Hokuto Omori, Atsuki Aoyagi and Dan Tamura. As for the Ōdō Tournament, Hayato made his first appearance at the 2021 edition where he fell short to T-Hawk in the first rounds from August 15.

== Championships and accomplishments ==
- All Japan Pro Wrestling
  - World Junior Heavyweight Championship (1 time)
  - All Asia Tag Team Championship (2 times) – with Yuma Anzai (1) and Atsuki Aoyagi (1)
  - January 2 Korakuen Hall New Year Battle Royal (2022)
  - All Japan vs. Ehime Pro 1 Day Six Man Tag Tournament (2019) - with Jun Akiyama & Carbell Ito
- Best Body Japan Pro-Wrestling
  - BBW Tag Team Championship (1 time) – with Imabari Towel Mascaras
- Osaka Pro Wrestling
  - Osaka Tag Team Championship (1 time) – with Santaro Ishizuchi
- Pro Wrestling Illustrated
  - Ranked No. 162 of the top 500 singles wrestlers in the PWI 500 in 2024
