= Koji Iwamoto =

Japanese professional wrestler (born 1990)

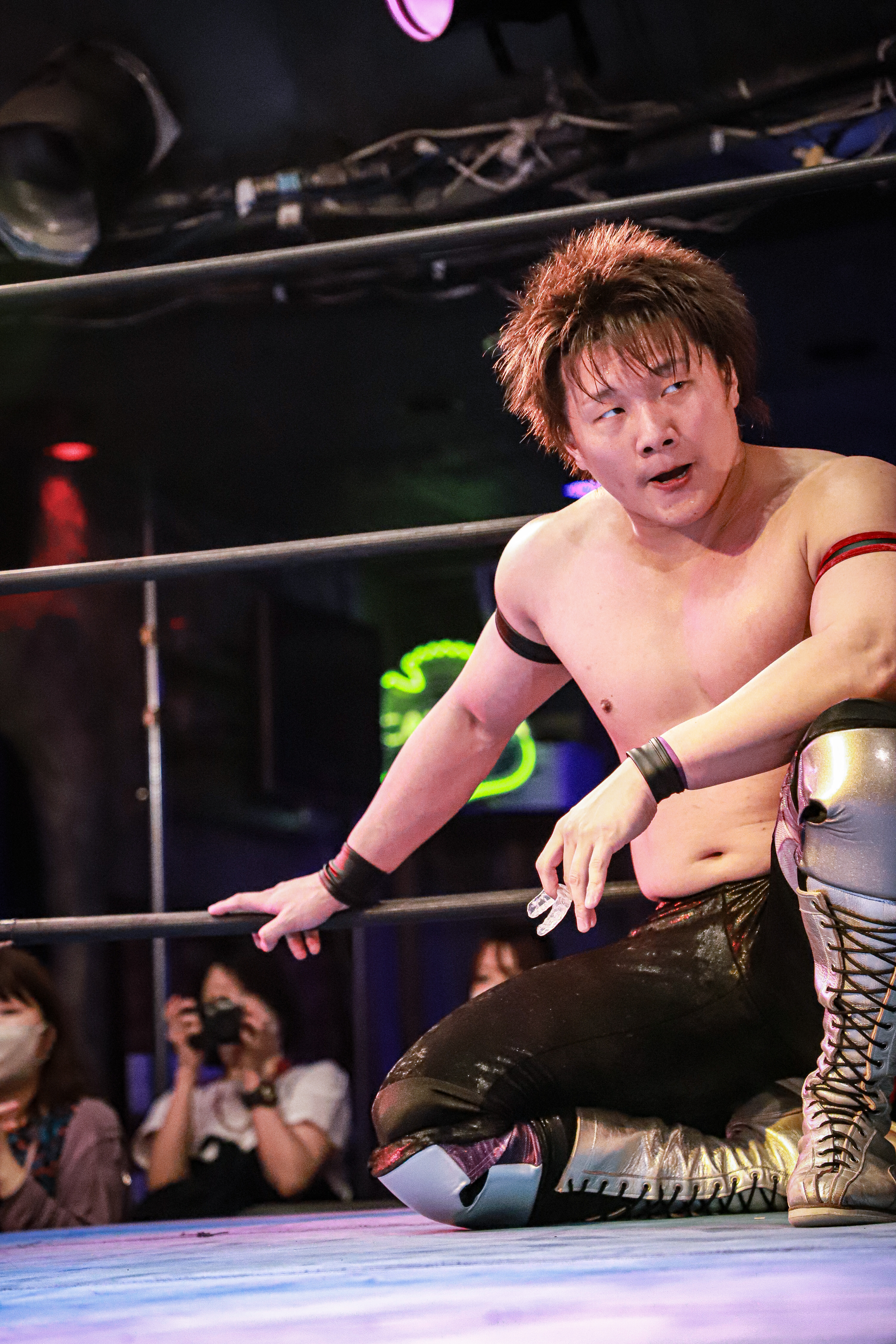
- Iwamoto in July 2023

Personal information
- Born: March 20, 1990 (age 36) Kuwana, Mie, Japan

Professional wrestling career
- Ring name: Koji Iwamoto
- Billed height: 1.75 m (5 ft 9 in)
- Billed weight: 90 kg (200 lb)
- Debut: November 4, 2012

Koji Iwamoto (岩本 煌史, Iwamoto Kōji; born March 20, 1990) is a Japanese professional wrestler best known for his time in All Japan Pro Wrestling. Iwamoto has previously competed for DDT Pro-Wrestling and Pro Wrestling Heat Up. He is a former four time AJPW World Junior Heavyweight Champion, as well as a two time All Asia Tag Team Champion.

== Professional wrestling career ==
=== Independent circuit (since 2012) ===
After graduating from Aichi University as a practiced judoka in 2012 Iwamoto began training with Shinya Ishida at the Sportiva Entertainment promotion. The two made their debuts together and became rivals throughout the coming years.

In 2013, Iwamoto primarily competed in Pro Wrestling HEAT UP and DDT Pro-Wrestling, more specifically Hard Hit DDT's brand as well as other promotions from time to time along. On February 28 Iwamoto competed in his first professional wrestling tournament at Hard Hit at the Second Grappling Tournament where he lost at the semifinals to Atsushi Aoki. On March 15, 2014, Iwamoto received his first ever title shot in a three-Way match between him, Hiroshi Fukuda and Psycho for the World Nice Guy Championship where PSYCHO came out victorious. On August 23 Iwamoto competed at the Next Contenders One Day Tournament defeating Kenta Hattori at the finals.

On March 22, 2015, Iwamoto participated at the Powerful Tag Tournament with Daisuke Kanehira where the duo was eliminated at the semifinals to Amigo Suzuki and Kazuhiro Tamura.

In January 2016 at Pro-Wrestling Basara, Iwamoto formed a stable name Kibatai with Ryota Nakatsu and Ryuichi Sekine. On February 6, 2016, at Heat-Up Iwamoto participated at the 2016 Powerful Tag Tournament this time with Minoru Tanaka where the two lost at the first round with Kazuhiro Tamura and Mineo Fujita. On June 16 Iwamoto defeated Daisuke Kanehira to become the #1 Contendership to the Heat-Up Universal Championship. On July 19 to August 16 Iwamoto participated in a tournament to crown the vacant GWC 6-Man Tag Team Championship. His partners were Daisuke and Joji Otani; they lost at the finals to Amigo Suzuki, Masao Orihara and Ryan Upin. On August 31, Iwamoto unsuccessfully challenged Tamura for the Heat-Up Universal Championship. On October 5 at Basara Iwamoto and his friend Fuminori Abe participated at the Iron Fist Tag Tournament but lost to Fuma and Yusuke Kubo at the first round.

=== All Japan Pro Wrestling (2016–2021) ===
On 2016 Iwamoto started to compete in All Japan Pro Wrestling. In November Iwamoto took part in the 2016 Jr. Tag Battle of Glory with Fuminori Abe. They finished the tournament with only two points defeating Axe Bombers (Daichi Kazato and Kazuhiro Tamura) on the last day of the tournament. On December 26, 2016, he was signed to All Japan Pro Wrestling. In January 2017 it was announced that Iwamoto was going to participate in the 2017 Jr. Battle of Glory which he won on February 26 defeating Hikaru Sato at the finals; with this Iwamoto won the tournament in his first appearance.

On March 12, Iwamoto unsuccessfully challenged Keisuke Ishii for the World Junior Heavyweight Championship. He received another shot at the title on June 28, but was this time defeated by Hikaru Sato. On July 15, 2018, he unsuccessfully challenged Atsushi Aoki for the championship, but rebounded on August 25 when he and Tajiri defeated Aoki and Hikaru Sato to win the 2018 Jr. Tag Battle Of Glory. Then the following day, he defeated Aoki to finally become the World Junior Heavyweight Champion. However, he wouldn't make any successful defenses as he lost the title to Shuji Kondo on September 22, ending his reign after less than a month. He faced Kondo again on November 29 and managed to defeat him to regain the World Junior Heavyweight Championship. After 172 days as champion, Iwamoto would lose the belt to Aoki on May 20, 2019.

After Iwamoto's loss, he would tag with Jake Lee to defeat Kazumi Kikuta & Ryuichi Kawakami to become an All Asia Tag Team Champion for the second time on June 18, 2019. During this time, Atsushi Aoki would unfortunately be killed in a motorcycle accident on June 3, 2019 and the World Junior Heavyweight Championship belt was vacated, and a tournament would be held to crown the new champion. Iwamoto would make it to the finals of said tournament, but would be defeated by Susumu Yokosuka on January 3, 2020. After four successful defenses, Iwamoto and Lee would lose the All Asia tag titles to Isami Kodaka and Yuko Miyamoto in March 23. Iwamoto would then defeat Yusuke Kodama in a #1 contender ship match in June 30 for the World Junior title.

He would then fulfil his opportunity the next month, by defeating Susumu Yokosuka to regain the World Junior championship for the third time in July 30. Iwamoto & Lee would participate in the 2020 Real World Tag League, where the team would make it to the finals, but would lose to the team of Miyahara & Yuma Aoyagi, and end up with a score of 8 points. After four successful defenses and 210 days as champion, he would be defeated by CIMA on February 20, 2021. Then during a six-man tag team match in February 23 between Iwamoto, Lee & Tajiri and Shotaro Ashino, Kuma Arashi and Koji Doi; Lee would betray Iwamoto by beating up on him post match.

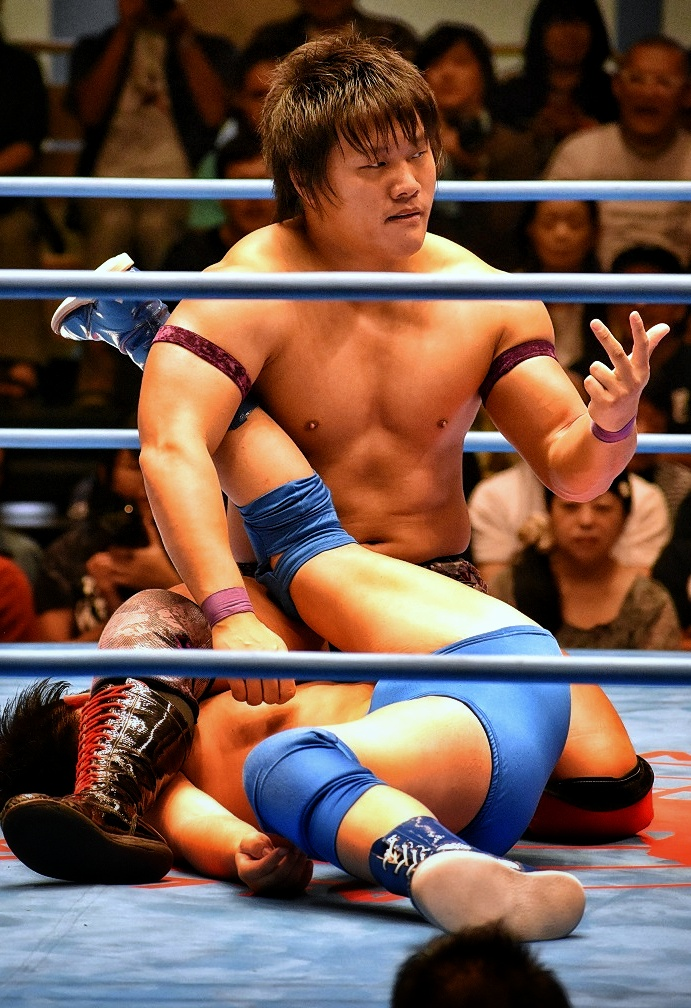
Iwamoto in September 2019

On June 9, Iwamoto would rematch CIMA and went on to defeat him to regain the World Junior Heavyweight Championship. However, he lost the championship only 17 days later on June 26 to Francesco Akira. In August, Iwamoto competed in the Odo Tournament 2021 where he defeated Koji Doi in the first round on August 15 but lost to Jake Lee in the quarterfinals on August 18. In the fall, Iwamoto then entered the Real World Tag League 2021 where he teamed with Ryuki Honda. They tied in second place in Block D with 3 points. On December 6, it was announced Iwamoto would leave All Japan following the expiration of his contract. His last match would be on December 16 where he and Black Menso~re lost to Atsuki Aoyagi and Rising Hayato.

== Championships and accomplishments ==
- All Japan Pro Wrestling
  - All Asia Tag Team Championship (2 times) – with Jake Lee
  - World Junior Heavyweight Championship (4 times)
  - Jr. Battle of Glory (2017, 2019)
  - Jr. Tag Battle of Glory (2018) – with Tajiri
  - All Asia Tag Team Championship Tournament (2019) – with Jake Lee
- DDT Pro-Wrestling
  - The Next Contenders One Day Tournament (2014)
- Niigata Pro Wrestling
  - Niigata Junior Heavyweight Championship (1 time)
  - Niigata Tag Team Championship (1 time) - with Hiroshi Yamato
- Pro Wrestling Heat Up
  - Heat Up Universal Tag Team Championship (1 time) - with Shinya Ishida
- Pro Wrestling Illustrated
  - Ranked No. 289 of the top 500 singles wrestlers in the PWI 500 in 2019
- Tenryu Project
  - Tenryu Project International Junior Heavyweight Championship (1 time)
  - Tenryu Project World 6-Man Tag Team Championship (1 time) — with Kouki Iwasaki and Shigehiro Irie
  - United National Tag Team Championship (1 time, current) – with Hideyoshi Kamitani
  - Tenryu Project Mixed 1 Day Tournament (2025) – with Chihiro Hashimoto
  - Ryūkon Cup (2026)
