= AJPW Junior League =

- Promotions: All Japan Pro Wrestling
- Other names: Junior Hyper League; Jr. Battle of Glory
- First event: 1983
- Signature matches: Tournament matches

The Junior League is an annual professional wrestling round-robin tournament held by All Japan Pro Wrestling, to decide the promotion's top junior heavyweight wrestler, as well as the #1 contender to the World Junior Heavyweight Championship. It was established in 1983 as a single-block round-robin tournament then in 2006, it began as a two-block round-robin tournament, in which each block's highest scorers face off in the finals. A victory is worth two points, a draw is worth one, and a loss zero; each match has a thirty-minute time limit. In 2012, the tournament was renamed the "Junior Hyper League". After no tournament took place in 2013, the 2014 tournament was dubbed "Jr. Battle of Glory", being announced to take place in February, instead of its usual place in the summer.

After a break due to the ongoing COVID-19 pandemic in 2020, the event was stalled and postponed. The tournament returned in 2021 but as a two-day event presenting a 16-man single elimination tournament.

The first winner of the tournament was Chavo Guerrero in 1983 and the latest one is Francesco Akira who won it in June 2021. Kai, Kotaro Suzuki, Shuji Kondo, and Koji Iwamoto are the only wrestlers to hold the title of champions on more than one occasion each.

== Results ==
=== List of winners ===
Year	Winner	Ref
1983	Chavo Guerrero	
1998	Yoshinari Ogawa	
2003	Carl Malenko	
2006	Kaz Hayashi	
2007	Chris Sabin	
2008	Kai	
2009	Shuji Kondo	
2010	Jimmy Yang	
2011	Kai (2)	
2012	Hiroshi Yamato	
2014	Kotaro Suzuki	
2015	Kotaro Suzuki (2)	
2016	Atsushi Aoki	
2017	Koji Iwamoto	
2018	Shuji Kondo (2)	
2019	Koji Iwamoto (2)	
2021	Francesco Akira	
2022	Atsuki Aoyagi	
2023	Dan Tamura	
2025	Atsuki Aoyagi (2)	

=== 1983 ===
In 1983, All Japan Pro Wrestling held the "NWA International Junior Heavyweight Title League" between May 12 and 26, 1983. The winner, Chavo Guerrero, also won the vacant NWA International Junior Heavyweight Championship.

Final standings
Wrestler	Score
Chavo Guerrero	12
Ultra Seven	11
Mike Davis	8
Shiro Koshinaka	4
Mitsuharu Misawa	0

Results	Chavo Guerrero	Mike Davis	Mitsuharu Misawa	Shiro Koshinaka	Ultra Seven
Chavo Guerrero	—N/a	Guerrero (12:15)	Guerrero (6:52)	Guerrero (7:45)	Double; Countout (11:10)
Mike Davis	Guerrero (12:15)	—N/a	Davis (10:11)	Davis (10:56)	Countout (7:23)
Mitsuharu Misawa	Guerrero (6:52)	Davis (10:11)	—N/a	Koshinaka (21:25)	Seven (11:26)
Shiro Koshinaka	Guerrero (7:45)	Davis (10:56)	Koshinaka (21:25)	—N/a	Seven (11:34)
Ultra Seven	Double; Countout (11:10)	Countout (7:23)	Seven (11:26)	Seven (11:34)	—N/a

Final
1	Chavo Guerrero	Pin
2	Ultra Seven

=== 1998 ===
In 1998, All Japan Pro Wrestling held the "World Junior Heavyweight Title League" between July 6 and 19, 1998. The winner, Yoshinari Ogawa, also won the vacant World Junior Heavyweight Championship.

Final standings
Wrestler	Score
Yoshinari Ogawa	??
Satoru Asako	??
Tsuyoshi Kikuchi	??
Kentaro Shiga	??
Yoshinobu Kanemaru	??

Final
1	Yoshinari Ogawa	Pin
2	Satoru Asako	15:31

=== 2003 ===
The 2003 Junior League was held from March 28 to April 10, 2003. The winner, Carl Malenko, went on to unsuccessfully challenge Kendo Kashin for the World Junior Heavyweight Championship on April 12, 2003.

Final standings
Wrestler	Score
Carl Malenko	8
Jimmy Yang	8
Kaz Hayashi	6
Gran Hamada	4
Ryuji Hijikata	2
Gran Naniwa	0

Results	Malenko	Hamada	Naniwa	Yang	Hayashi	Hijikata
Malenko	—N/a	Malenko (6:25)	Malenko (6:45)	Malenko (7:53)	Hayashi (11:01)	Malenko (6:16)
Hamada	Malenko (6:25)	—N/a	Hamada (8:27)	Yang (9:34)	Hayashi (12:15)	Hamada (8:56)
Naniwa	Malenko (6:45)	Hamada (8:27)	—N/a	Yang (10:17)	Hayashi (9:46)	Hijikata (10:30)
Yang	Malenko (7:53)	Yang (9:34)	Yang (10:17)	—N/a	Yang (8:47)	Yang (7:42)
Hayashi	Hayashi (11:01)	Hayashi (12:15)	Hayashi (9:46)	Yang (8:47)	—N/a	Hijikata (11:20)
Hijikata	Malenko (6:16)	Hamada (8:56)	Hijikata (10:30)	Yang (7:42)	Hijikata (11:20)	—N/a

Final
1	Carl Malenko	Pin
2	Jimmy Yang	5:17

=== 2006 ===
The 2006 Junior League was held from June 25 to July 3 over six shows and featured two blocks of four. Foreign participation included Taka Michinoku from Kaientai Dojo and Virus from Consejo Mundial de Lucha Libre. The winner, Kaz Hayashi, won every match he participated in; he went on to fail in his challenge to Junior Heavyweight champion Shuji Kondo on August 27. Note that "brother" YASSHI wrestled as "strong" YASSHI for two of his matches.

Final standings
Block A		Block B	
Kaz Hayashi	6	Katsuhiko Nakajima	5
Taka Michinoku	4	Katsushi Takemura	4
Ryuji Hijikata	2	Virus	2
"brother" Yasshi	0	Mazada	1

Block A	Hayashi	Hijikata	Michinoku	Yasshi
Hayashi	—N/a	Hayashi (13:32)	Hayashi (28:05)	Hayashi (3:28)
Hijikata	Hayashi (13:32)	—N/a	Michinoku (13:46)	Hijikata (3:24)
Michinoku	Hayashi (28:05)	Michinoku (13:46)	—N/a	Michinoku (1:54)
Yasshi	Hayashi (3:28)	Hijikata (3:24)	Michinoku (1:54)	—N/a
Block B	Mazada	Nakajima	Takemura	Virus
Mazada	—N/a	Draw (30:00)	Takemura (13:58)	Virus (12:53)
Nakajima	Draw (30:00)	—N/a	Nakajima (14:17)	Nakajima (11:01)
Takemura	Takemura (13:58)	Nakajima (14:17)	—N/a	Takemura (10:32)
Virus	Virus (12:53)	Nakajima (11:01)	Takemura (10:32)	—N/a

Final
A1	Kaz Hayashi	Pin
B1	Katsuhiko Nakajima	20:58

=== 2007 ===
The 2007 Junior League, was held from June 24 to July 1 over six shows, involving two blocks of five. Foreign participation included Chris Sabin from Total Nonstop Action Wrestling. Unlike the previous year, the Junior Heavyweight champion, Katsuhiko Nakajima, was allowed to compete.

Final standings
Block A		Block B	
Shuji Kondo	6	Chris Sabin	6
Ryuji Hijikata	4	Dick Togo	5
Katsuhiko Nakajima	4	Miguel Hayashi, Jr.	4
Pepe Michinoku	4	Akira	3
El NOSAWA Mendoza	2	"brother" Yasshi	2

Block A	Hijikata	Kondo	Mendoza	Michinoku	Nakajima
Hijikata	—N/a	Kondo (9:28)	Mendoza (10:40)	Hijikata (0:43)	Hijikata (12:22)
Kondo	Kondo (9:28)	—N/a	Kondo (7:08)	Michinoku (0:24)	Kondo (19:47)
Mendoza	Mendoza (10:40)	Kondo (7:08)	—N/a	Michinoku (7:45)	Nakajima (10:49)
Michinoku	Hijikata (0:43)	Michinoku (0:24)	Michinoku (7:45)	—N/a	Nakajima (19:05)
Nakajima	Hijikata (12:22)	Kondo (19:47)	Nakajima (10:49)	Nakajima (19:05)	—N/a
Block B	Akira	Hayashi	Sabin	Togo	Yasshi
Akira	—N/a	Akira (19:24)	Sabin (12:33)	Draw (30:00)	Yasshi (16:44)
Hayashi	Akira (19:24)	—N/a	Hayashi (12:57)	Togo (18:35)	Hayashi (9:27)
Sabin	Sabin (12:33)	Hayashi (12:57)	—N/a	Sabin (14:43)	Sabin (8:28)
Togo	Draw (30:00)	Togo (18:35)	Sabin (14:43)	—N/a	Togo (8:28)
Yasshi	Yasshi (16:44)	Hayashi (9:27)	Sabin (8:28)	Togo (8:28)	—N/a

Final
A1	Shuji Kondo	Pin
B1	Chris Sabin	15:45

=== 2008 ===
The 2008 Junior League featured two blocks of five and is being held from July 20 to August 3 over nine shows.

Final standings
Block A		Block B	
Kai	5	Silver King	6
Mazada	4	Takemura	4
El Samurai	4	Kaz Hayashi	4
Shuji Kondo	4	Phil Atlas	3
Ryuji Hijikata	3	T28	3

Block A	Hijikata	Kai	Kondo	Mazada	Samurai
Hijikata	—N/a	Draw (30:00)	Kondo (0:33)	Hijikata (14:24)	Samurai (10:58)
Kai	Draw (30:00)	—N/a	Kondo (18:49)	Kai (9:48)	Kai (11:51)
Shuji Kondo	Kondo (0:33)	Kondo (18:49)	—N/a	Mazada (16:32)	Samurai (10:03)
MAZADA	Hijikata (14:24)	Kai (9:48)	Mazada (16:32)	—N/a	Mazada (16:22)
Samurai	Samurai (10:58)	Kai (11:51)	Samurai (10:03)	Mazada (16:22)	—N/a
Block B	Atlas	Hayashi	King	T28	Takemura
Atlas	—N/a	Atlas (10:45)	King (11:33)	Draw (30:00)	Takemura (13:54)
Hayashi	Atlas (10:45)	—N/a	Hayashi (14:20)	Hayashi (13:52)	Takemura (13:24)
King	King (11:33)	Hayashi (14:20)	—N/a	King (10:10)	King (14:03)
T28	Draw (30:00)	Hayashi (13:52)	King (10:10)	—N/a	T28 (16:32)
Takemura	Takemura (13:54)	Takemura (13:24)	King (14:03)	T28 (16:32)	—N/a

Final
A1	KAI	Pin
B1	Silver King	13:00

=== 2009 ===
The 2009 Junior League featured two blocks of five and is being held from July 26 to August 7 over eight shows. Foreign participants included Petey Williams and Super Crazy. The winner, Shuji Kondo, went on to fail in his challenge to Junior Heavyweight champion Kaz Hayashi on August 30.

Final standings
Block A		Block B	
Kai	6	Minoru	8
Super Crazy	5	Shuji Kondo	6
Kaz Hayashi	3	Petey Williams	2
Nosawa Rongai	2	Mazada	2
Toshizo	0	Hiroshi Yamato	2

Block A	Kai	Hayashi	Rongai	Crazy	Toshizo
Kai	—N/a	Kai (12:02)	Nosawa (12:23)	Kai (11:11)	Kai (10:30)
Hayashi	Kai (12:00)	—N/a	Hayashi (24:47)	Draw (30:00)	DCO (12:29)
Rongai	Nosawa (12:23)	Hayashi (24:47)	—N/a	Crazy (8:37)	DDQ (9:54)
Crazy	Kai (11:11)	Draw (30:00)	Crazy (8:37)	—N/a	Crazy (11:31)
Toshizo	Kai (10:30)	DCO (12:29)	DDQ (9:54)	Crazy (11:31)	—N/a
Block B	Yamato	Mazada	Minoru	Williams	Kondo
Yamato	—N/a	Mazada (11:55)	Minoru (11:27)	Yamato (11:11)	Kondo (9:06)
Mazada	Mazada (11:55)	—N/a	Minoru (10:26)	Williams (6:55)	Kondo (8:58)
Minoru	Minoru (11:27)	Minoru (10:26)	—N/a	Minoru (11:15)	Minoru (19:10)
Williams	Yamato (11:11)	Williams (6:55)	Minoru (11:15)	—N/a	Kondo (11:21)
Kondo	Kondo (9:06)	Kondo (8:58)	Minoru (19:10)	Kondo (11:21)	—N/a

Semifinals
A1	KAI	Pin
B2	Shuji Kondo	9:08
B1	Minoru	Pin
A2	Super Crazy	8:21

Finals
B2	Shuji Kondo	Pin
A2	Super Crazy	13:42

=== 2010 ===
The 2010 Junior League featured two blocks of six and was held from July 25 to August 8 over nine shows. The winner, Jimmy Yang, went on to unsuccessfully challenge Kaz Hayashi for the World Junior Heavyweight Championship on August 29, 2010.

Final standings
Block A		Block B	
Minoru	8	Kai	8
Hiroshi Yamato	6	Jimmy Yang	6
Kaz Hayashi	5	Bushi	4
Super Crazy	5	Mazada	4
Hikaru Sato	4	Shuji Kondo	4
Antonio Thomas	2	Taka Michinoku	4

Block A	Thomas	Sato	Yamato	Hayashi	Minoru	Crazy
Thomas	—N/a	Thomas (8:42)	Yamato (11:15)	Hayashi (14:46)	Tanaka (10:49)	Crazy (7:38)
Sato	Thomas (8:42)	—N/a	Sato (8:42)	Hayashi (9:35)	Tanaka (8:09)	Sato (10:01)
Yamato	Yamato (11:15)	Sato (8:42)	—N/a	Yamato (12:55)	Minoru (10:54)	Yamato (Forfeit)
Hayashi	Hayashi (14:46)	Sato (9:35)	Yamato (12:55)	—N/a	Minoru (15:03)	Draw (30:00)
Minoru	Tanaka (10:49)	Tanaka (8:09)	Tanaka (10:54)	Hayashi (15:03)	—N/a	Crazy (7:34)
Crazy	Crazy (7:38)	Sato (10:01)	Yamato (Forfeit)	Draw (30:00)	Crazy (7:34)	—N/a
Block B	Bushi	Yang	Kai	MAZADA	Kondo	Michinoku
Bushi	—N/a	Bushi (7:03)	Kai (13:17)	Bushi (4:49)	Kondo (13:24)	Michinoku (10:51)
Yang	Bushi (7:03)	—N/a	Kai (8:29)	Yang (10:00)	Yang (6:25)	Yang (8:36)
Kai	Kai (13:17)	Kai (8:29)	—N/a	Kai (Forfeit)	Kai (9:22)	Michinoku (8:55)
Mazada	Bushi (4:49)	Yang (10:00)	Kai (Forfeit)	—N/a	Mazada (9:15)	Mazada (6:18)
Kondo	Kondo (13:24)	Yang (6:52)	Kai (9:22)	Mazada (9:15)	—N/a	Kondo (10:03)
Michinoku	Michinoku (10:51)	Yang (8:36)	Michinoku (8:55)	Mazada (6:18)	Kondo (10:03)	—N/a

Semifinals
A1	Minoru	Pin
B2	Jimmy Yang	10:57
B1	KAI	Pin
A2	Hiroshi Yamato	8:54

Finals
B2	Jimmy Yang	Pin
B1	KAI	13:06

=== 2011 ===
The 2011 Junior League featured two blocks of six and was held from September 11 to September 25 over nine shows. With his win, KAI became the first person to have won the tournament twice.

Final standings
Block A		Block B	
Kai	7	Koji Kanemoto	8
Kenny Omega	6	Shuji Kondo	6
Minoru	5	Jimmy Yang	6
Black Bushi	4	Hiroshi Yamato	4
Bushi	4	Hikaru Sato	4
Kaz Hayashi	4	Mazada	2

Block A	B. Bushi	Bushi	Kai	hayashi	Omega	Minoru
B. Bushi	—N/a	B. Bushi (4:15)	Kai (7:05)	B. Bushi (10:15)	Omega (11:07)	Minoru (10:26)
Bushi	B. Bushi (4:15)	—N/a	Kai (10:30)	Bushi (11:51)	Omega (8:59)	Bushi (15:08)
Kai	Kai (7:05)	Kai (10:30)	—N/a	Kai (14:01)	Omega (18:07)	Draw (30:00)
Hayashi	B. Bushi (10:15)	Bushi (11:51)	Kai (14:01)	—N/a	Hayashi (13:43)	Hayashi (12:21)
Omega	Omega (11:07)	Omega (8:59)	Omega (18:07)	Hayashi (13:43)	—N/a	Minoru (16:52)
Minoru	Minoru (10:26)	Bushi (15:08)	Draw (30:00)	Hayashi (12:21)	Minoru (16:52)	—N/a
Block B	Sato	Yamato	Yang	Kanemoto	Mazada	Kondo
Sato	—N/a	Yamato (13:39)	Sato (8:32)	Kanemoto (10:32)	Sato (9:42)	Kondo (9:30)
Yamato	Yamato (13:39)	—N/a	Yang (9:43)	Kanemoto (9:31)	Yamato (12:46)	Kondo (10:55)
Yang	Sato (8:32)	Yang (9:43)	—N/a	Yang (11:45)	Yang (7:27)	Kondo (7:58)
Kanemoto	Kanemoto (10:32)	Kanemoto (9:31)	Yang (11:45)	—N/a	Kanemoto (10:37)	Kanemoto (13:28)
Mazada	Sato (9:42)	Yamato (12:46)	Yang (7:27)	Kanemoto (10:37)	—N/a	Mazada (2:11)
Konso	Kondo (9:30)	Kondo (10:55)	Kondo (7:58)	Kanemoto (13:28)	Mazada (2:11)	—N/a

Final
A1	KAI	Pin
B1	Koji Kanemoto	22:16

=== 2012 ===
The 2012 Junior League, dubbed "Junior Hyper League", featured two blocks of six and was held from July 15 to July 29 over ten shows.

Final standings
Block A		Block B	
Koji Kanemoto	8	Shuji Kondo	7
Kai	6	Hiroshi Yamato	7
Hikaru Sato	5	Kaz Hayashi	6
Minoru Tanaka	5	Sushi	6
Mazada	4	Gillette	2
Aegyptus Aerial	2	Andy Wu	0

Block A	Aerial	Sato	Kai	Kanemoto	Mazada	Tanaka
Aerial	—N/a	Sato (6:53)	Kai (6:02)	Kanemoto (7:01)	Aerial (10:17)	Tanaka (9:34)
Sato	Sato (6:53)	—N/a	Sato (14:01)	Mazada (9:23)	Kanemoto (17:47)	Draw (30:00)
Kai	Kai (6:02)	Sato (14:01)	—N/a	Kanemoto (14:47)	Kai (8:20)	Kai (14:05)
Kanemoto	Kanemoto (7:01)	Kanemoto (17:47)	Kanemoto (14:47)	—N/a	Kanemoto (12:21)	Tanaka (23:28)
Mazada	Aerial (10:17)	Mazada (9:23)	Kai (8:20)	Kanemoto (12:21)	—N/a	Mazada (9:27)
Tanaka	Tanaka (9:34)	Draw (30:00)	Kai (14:05)	Tanaka (23:28)	Mazada (9:27)	—N/a
Block B	Wu	Gillette	Yamato	Hayashi	Kondo	Sushi
Wu	—N/a	Gillette (4:50)	Yamato (5:56)	Hayashi (6:38)	Kondo (5:58)	Sushi (6:08)
Gillette	Gillette (4:50)	—N/a	Yamato (11:30)	Hayashi (9:44)	Kondo (8:11)	Sushi (9:35)
Yamato	Yamato (5:56)	Yamato (11:30)	—N/a	Yamato (11:01)	Draw (30:00)	Sushi (12:15)
Hayashi	Hayashi (6:38)	Hayashi (9:44)	Yamato (11:01)	—N/a	Kondo (12:26)	Hayashi (9:11)
Kondo	Kondo (5:58)	Kondo (8:11)	Draw (30:00)	Kondo (12:26)	—N/a	Kondo (8:28)
Sushi	Sushi (6:08)	Sushi (9:35)	Sushi (12:15)	Hayashi (9:11)	Kondo (8:28)	—N/a

Semifinals
A1	Koji Kanemoto	Pin
B2	Hiroshi Yamato	19:18
B1	Shuji Kondo	Pin
A2	KAI	7:25

Finals
B2	Hiroshi Yamato	Pin
B1	Shuji Kondo	14:28

=== 2014 ===
The 2014 Junior League, dubbed "Jr. Battle of Glory", featured two blocks of five and was held from February 5 to February 16 over eight shows.

Final standings
Block A		Block B	
Kotaro Suzuki	6	Masaaki Mochizuki	6
Atsushi Aoki	5	Hikaru Sato	4
Último Dragón	5	Soma Takao	4
Ryuji Hijikata	2	Yoshinobu Kanemaru	4
Kaji Tomato	2	Sushi	2

Block A	Aoki	Tomato	Suzuki	Hijikata	Dragón
Aoki	—N/a	Tomato (11:53)	Aoki (19:09)	Aoki (12:19)	Draw (30:00)
Tomato	Tomato (11:53)	—N/a	Suzuki (9:54)	Hijikata (9:46)	Dragón (8:14)
Suzuki	Aoki (19:09)	Suzuki (9:54)	—N/a	Suzuki (13:07)	Suzuki (15:05)
Hijikata	Aoki (12:19)	Hijikata (9:46)	Suzuki (13:07)	—N/a	Dragón (10:41)
Dragón	Draw (30:00)	Dragón (8:14)	Suzuki (15:05)	Dragón (10:41)	—N/a
Block B	Sato	Mochizuki	Takao	Sushi	Kanemaru
Sato	—N/a	Mochizuki (10:40)	Takao (8:25)	Sato (12:14)	Sato (9:48)
Mochizuki	Mochizuki (10:40)	—N/a	Mochizuki (9:36)	Sushi (11:28)	Mochizuki (14:04)
Takao	Takao (8:25)	Mochizuki (9:36)	—N/a	Takao (9:56)	Kanemaru (9:10)
Sushi	Sato (12:14)	Sushi (11:28)	Takao (9:56)	—N/a	Kanemaru (9:53)
Kanemaru	Sato (9:48)	Mochizuki (14:04)	Kanemaru (9:10)	Kanemaru (9:53)	—N/a

Final
A1	Kotaro Suzuki	Pin
B1	Masaaki Mochizuki	18:45

=== 2015 ===
The 2015 Jr. Battle of Glory featured two blocks of five and was held from February 7 to February 20 over nine shows.

Final standings
Block A		Block B	
Atsushi Aoki	6	Kotaro Suzuki	6
Keisuke Ishii	4	Yoshinobu Kanemaru	5
Takeshi Minamino	4	Sushi	3
Último Dragón	4	Hikaru Sato	3
Yohei Nakajima	2	Soma Takao	3

Block A	Aoki	Ishii	Minamino	Dragón	Nakajima
Aoki	—N/a	Aoki (10:10)	Minamino (8:39)	Aoki (10:49)	Aoki (6:32)
Ishii	Aoki (10:10)	—N/a	Ishii (8:26)	Dragón (11:44)	Ishii (9:41)
Minamino	Minamino (8:39)	Ishii (8:26)	—N/a	Minamino (12:27)	Nakajima (6:59)
Dragón	Aoki (10:49)	Dragón (11:44)	Minamino (12:27)	—N/a	Dragón (13:09)
Nakajima	Aoki (6:32)	Ishii (9:41)	Nakajima (6:59)	Dragón (13:09)	—N/a
Block B	Sato	Suzuki	Takao	Sushi	Kanemaru
Sato	—N/a	Suzuki (13:37)	Sato (9:36)	Sushi (9:15)	Draw (30:00)
Suzuki	Suzuki (13:37)	—N/a	Suzuki (9:30)	Suzuki (4:34)	Kanemaru (11:40)
Takao	Sato (9:36)	Suzuki (9:30)	—N/a	Draw (30:00)	Takao (7:33)
Sushi	Sushi (9:15)	Suzuki (4:34)	Draw (30:00)	—N/a	Kanemaru (11:20)
Kanemaru	Draw (30:00)	Kanemaru (11:40)	Takao (7:33)	Kanemaru (11:20)	—N/a

Final
A1	Atsushi Aoki	Pin
B1	Kotaro Suzuki	17:11

=== 2016 ===
The 2016 Jr. Battle of Glory featured two blocks of four and was held from February 12 to February 21 over five shows and contested for the vacant World Junior Heavyweight Championship. Originally Kazuki Hashimoto won block B, but had to pull out of the finals due to a hand fracture, leading to AJPW booking a playoff match between Hikaru Sato and Atsushi Maruyama to determine the finalist.

Final standings
Block A		Block B	
Atsushi Aoki	4	Kazuki Hashimoto	4
Soma Takao	2	Hikaru Sato	3
Sushi	0	Atsushi Maruyama	3
Takeshi Minamino	0	Ryuji Hijikata	2

Block A	Aoki	Takao	Sushi	Minamino
Aoki	—N/a	Aoki (6:41)	Aoki (4:07)	NC (5:01)
Takao	Aoki (6:41)	—N/a	Takao (8:56)	NC (3:39)
Sushi	Aoki (4:07)	Takao (8:56)	—N/a	NC (5:03)
Minamino	NC (5:01)	NC (3:39)	NC (5:03)	—N/a
Block B	Maruyama	Sato	Hashimoto	Hijikata
Maruyama	—N/a	Sato (12:51)	Draw (20:00)	Maruyama (9:58)
Sato	Sato (12:51)	—N/a	Draw (20:00)	Hijikata (13:14)
Hashimoto	Draw (20:00)	Draw (20:00)	—N/a	Hashimoto (12:02)
Hijikata	Maruyama (9:58)	Hijikata (13:14)	Hashimoto (12:02)	—N/a

Playoff			Final
			A1	Atsushi Aoki	Sub
B1	Atsushi Maruyama	Sub	B1	Hikaru Sato	15:18
B1	Hikaru Sato	4:13

=== 2017 ===
The 2017 Jr. Battle of Glory featured two blocks of five and was held from February 17 to February 26 over six shows.

Final standings
Block A		Block B	
Koji Iwamoto	4	Hikaru Sato	5
Atsushi Aoki	3	Atsushi Maruyama	4
Keisuke Ishii	3	Kazuhiro Tamura	4
Masashi Takeda	3	Yohei Nakajima	4
Minoru Tanaka	3	Yuma Aoyagi	3

Block A	Aoki	Ishii	Iwamoto	Takeda	Tanaka
Aoki	—N/a	Draw (5:28)	Draw (20:00)	Takeda (13:39)	Aoki (11:22)
Ishii	Draw (5:28)	—N/a	Draw (10:08)	Draw (20:00)	Ishii (12:27)
Iwamoto	Draw (20:00)	Draw (10:08)	—N/a	Iwamoto (7:34)	Draw (20:00)
Takeda	Takeda (13:39)	Draw (20:00)	Iwamoto (7:34)	—N/a	Tanaka (10:05)
Tanaka	Aoki (11:22)	Ishii (12:27)	Draw (20:00)	Tanaka (10:05)	—N/a
Block B	Maruyama	Sato	Tamura	Nakajima	Aoyagi
Maruyama	—N/a	Draw (20:00)	Tamura (4:54)	Maruyama (6:14)	Draw (20:00)
Sato	Draw (20:00)	—N/a	Sato (7:35)	Nakajima (11:06)	Sato (4:08)
Tamura	Tamura (4:54)	Sato (7:35)	—N/a	Nakajima (9:21)	Tamura (6:47)
Nakajima	Maruyama (6:14)	Nakajima (11:06)	Nakajima (9:21)	—N/a	Aoyagi (8:09)
Aoyagi	Draw (20:00)	Sato (4:08)	Tamura (6:47)	Aoyagi (8:09)	—N/a

Final
A1	Koji Iwamoto	Sub
B1	Hikaru Sato	16:51

=== 2018 ===
The 2018 Jr. Battle of Glory will feature two blocks of six and will be held from February 13 to February 25 over nine shows.

Final standings
Block A		Block B	
Shuji Kondo	8	Koji Iwamoto	7
Soma Takao	7	Tajiri	6
Atsushi Aoki	7	Hikaru Sato	6
Atsushi Maruyama	4	Kotaro Suzuki	5
Yusuke Okada	2	Mineo Fujita	4
Keiichi Sato	2	Yohei Nakajima	2

Block A	Aoki	Maruyama	Sato	Kondo	Takao	Okada
Aoki	—N/a	Aoki (12:22)	Aoki (5:07)	Kondo (13:29)	Draw (20:00)	Aoki (7:16)
Maruyama	Aoki (12:22)	—N/a	Sato (4:33)	Kondo (2:53)	Maruyama (4:25)	Maruyama (5:58)
Sato	Aoki (5:07)	Sato (4:33)	—N/a	Kondo (4:09)	Takao (6:53)	Okada (4:25)
Kondo	Kondo (13:29)	Kondo (2:53)	Kondo (4:09)	—N/a	Takao (5:12)	Kondo (2:19)
Takao	Draw (20:00)	Maruyama (4:25)	Takao (6:53)	Takao (5:12)	—N/a	Takao (10:38)
Okada	Aoki (7:16)	Maruyama (5:58)	Okada (4:25)	Kondo (2:19)	Takao (10:38)	—N/a
Block B	Sato	Iwamoto	Suzuki	Fujita	Tajiri	Nakajima
Sato	—N/a	Iwamoto (10:52)	Sato (4:39)	Sato (14:13)	Tajiri (10:14)	Sato (11:29)
Iwamoto	Iwamoto (10:52)	—N/a	Draw (20:00)	Fujita (10:27)	Iwamato (4:23)	Iwamoto (9:03)
Suzuki	Sato (4:39)	Draw (20:00)	—N/a	Suzuki (8:57)	Suzuki (10:57)	Nakajima (4:01)
Fujita	Sato (14:13)	Fujita (10:27)	Suzuki (8:57)	—N/a	Tajiri (7:08)	Fujita (6:33)
Tajiri	Tajiri (10:14)	Iwamato (4:23)	Suzuki (10:57)	Tajiri (7:08)	—N/a	Tajiri (12:49)
Nakajima	Sato (11:29)	Iwamoto (9:03)	Nakajima (4:01)	Fujita (6:33)	Tajiri (12:49)	—N/a

Final
A1	Shuji Kondo	19:31
B1	Koji Iwamoto	Pin

=== 2019 ===
The 2019 Junior League featured two blocks of six and was held from February 7 to February 24 over eleven shows.

Final standings
Block A		Block B	
Koji Iwamoto	8	Seiki Yoshioka	7
Kotaro Suzuki	7	Atsushi Aoki	6
Tajiri	6	Hikaru Sato	5
Yusuke Okada	4	Black Menso~re	4
Atsushi Maruyama	3	Chikara	4
Akira Francesco	2	Black Tiger VII	4

Block A	Francesco	Maruyama	Iwamoto	Suzuki	Tajiri	Okada
Francesco	—N/a	Francesco (8:04)	Iwamoto (8:42)	Suzuki (9:28)	Tajiri (11:32)	Okada (10:34)
Maruyama	Francesco (8:04)	—N/a	Iwamoto (12:33)	Draw (20:00)	Maruyama (14:35)	Okada (11:56)
Iwamoto	Iwamoto (8:42)	Iwamoto (12:33)	—N/a	Suzuki (14:08)	Iwamoto (16:11)	Iwamoto (7:48)
Suzuki	Suzuki (9:28)	Draw (20:00)	Suzuki (14:08)	—N/a	Tajiri (14:50)	Suzuki (10:20)
Tajiri	Tajiri (11:32)	Maruyama (14:35)	Iwamoto (16:11)	Tajiri (14:50)	—N/a	Tajiri (12:20)
Okada	Okada (10:34)	Okada (11:56)	Iwamoto (7:48)	Suzuki (10:20)	Tajiri (12:20)	—N/a
Block B	Aoki	Menso~re	Tiger	Chikara	Sato	Yoshioka
Aoki	—N/a	Aoki (13:40)	Tiger (12:33)	Aoki (8:50)	Sato (16:53)	Aoki (11:05)
Menso~re	Aoki (13:40)	—N/a	Menso (5:35)	Menso (6:24)	Sato (11:08)	Yoshioka (12:07)
Tiger	Tiger (12:33)	Menso (5:35)	—N/a	Chikara (4:01)	Tiger (12:10)	Yoshioka (8:42)
Chikara	Aoki (8:50)	Menso (6:24)	Chikara (4:01)	—N/a	Chikara (11:20)	Yoshioka (4:59)
Sato	Sato (16:53)	Sato (11:08)	Tiger (12:10)	Chikara (11:20)	—N/a	Draw (20:00)
Yoshioka	Aoki (11:05)	Yoshioka (12:07)	Yoshioka (8:42)	Yoshioka (4:59)	Draw (20:00)	—N/a

Final
A1	Koji Iwamoto	Pin
B1	Seiki Yoshioka	14:59

=== 2021 ===
The 2021 edition featured a single elimination tournament that took place between June 2 and June 3, 2021.

First round (June 2)
Francesco Akira	Pin
Tajiri	11:42
Dan Tamura	Pin
Tatsuhito Takaiwa	9:28
Yusuke Kodama	Pin
Black Mensore	9:52
Atsuki Aoyagi	Pin
Sugi	8:08
Hikaru Sato	Pin
Hokuto Omori	12:52
Devil Murasaki	Pin
Fuminori Abe	6:29
Izanagi	Pin
Brahman Kei	4:53
Rising Hayato	Pin
El Lindaman	14:15

Second round (June 3)
Francesco Akira	Pin
Tatsuhito Takaiwa	3:08
Yusuke Kodama	Pin
Sugi	7:57
Hikaru Sato	Pin
Fuminori Abe	9:13
Izanagi	Pin
El Lindaman	8:10

Semifinals (June 3)
Francesco Akira	Pin
Sugi	9:13
Hikaru Sato	Pin
El Lindaman	12:47

Finals (June 3)
Francesco Akira	Pin
El Lindaman	18:31

=== 2022 ===
The 2022 Junior League features one block of six participants and is held at the same time as the World's Strongest Tag Determination League between November 13 and December 7.

Final standings
Wrestler	Score
Atsuki Aoyagi	8
Dan Tamura	8
Rising Hayato	6
Hikaru Sato	6
Ryo Inoue	2
Hokuto Omori	0

Results	Inoue	Hayato	Sato	Aoyagi	Omori	Tamura
Inoue	—N/a	Hayato (5:28)	Sato (1:12)	Aoyagi (5:29)	Inoue (3:35)	Tamura (5:32)
Hayato	Hayato (5:28)	—N/a	Hayato (6:52)	Aoyagi (9:51)	Hayato (6:08)	Tamura (8:36)
Sato	Sato (1:12)	Hayato (6:52)	—N/a	Sato (9:54)	Sato (9:56)	Tamura (9:05)
Aoyagi	Aoyagi (5:29)	Aoyagi (9:51)	Sato (9:54)	—N/a	Aoyagi (9:26)	Aoyagi (9:29)
Omori	Inoue (3:35)	Hayato (6:08)	Sato (9:56)	Aoyagi (9:26)	—N/a	Tamura (6:46)
Tamura	Tamura (5:32)	Tamura (8:36)	Tamura (9:05)	Aoyagi (9:29)	Tamura (6:46)	—N/a

Final
1	Atsuki Aoyagi	Pin
2	Dan Tamura	17:01

=== 2023 ===
The 2023 Junior League features one block of eight participants and is held at the same time as the World's Strongest Tag Determination League between November 12 and December 6.

Final standings
Wrestler	Score
Dan Tamura	8
Naruki Doi	8
Koji Iwamoto	7
Rising Hayato	7
Hikaru Sato	7
Fuminori Abe	7
Atsuki Aoyagi	7
Ryo Inoue	5

Results	Aoyagi	Hayato	Tamura	Inoue	Sato	Doi	Iwamoto	Abe
Aoyagi	—N/a	Hayato (9:26)	Tamura (8:58)	Aoyagi (8:09)	Sato (9:57)	Aoyagi (3:47)	Draw (10:00)	Aoyagi (8:05)
Hayato	Hayato (9:26)	—N/a	Tamura (9:44)	Inoue (6:54)	Hayato (8:45)	Hayato (9:49)	Draw (10:00)	Abe (8:06)
Tamura	Tamura (8:58)	Tamura (9:44)	—N/a	Tamura (8:27)	Draw (10:00)	Draw (10:00)	Iwamoto (8:19)	Abe (8:57)
Inoue	Aoyagi (8:09)	Inoue (6:54)	Tamura (8:27)	—N/a	Inoue (7:49)	Draw (10:00)	Iwamoto (4:24)	Abe (7:20)
Sato	Sato (9:57)	Hayato (8:45)	Draw (10:00)	Inoue (7:49)	—N/a	Doi (4:53)	Sato (8:49)	Sato (6:52)
Doi	Aoyagi (3:47)	Hayato (9:49)	Draw (10:00)	Draw (10:00)	Doi (4:53)	—N/a	Doi (8:53)	Doi (5:50)
Iwamoto	Draw (10:00)	Draw (10:00)	Iwamoto (8:19)	Iwamoto (4:24)	Sato (8:49)	Doi (8:53)	—N/a	Draw (10:00)
Abe	Aoyagi (8:05)	Abe (8:06)	Abe (8:57)	Abe (7:20)	Sato (6:52)	Doi (5:50)	Draw (10:00)	—N/a

Final
1	Dan Tamura	Pin
2	Naruki Doi	15:30

=== 2025 ===
The 2025 Junior League, held under the name of "Zennichi Junior Festival," took place between July 17 and August 3.

Final standings
Block A		Block B	
Rising Hayato	6	Atsuki Aoyagi	6
Seiki Yoshioka	4	Naruki Doi	4
Seigo Tachibana	4	Dan Tamura	4
Hikaru Sato	4	Musashi	4
Ryo Inoue	2	Fuminori Abe	2

Block A	Hayato	Inoue	Sato	Tachibana	Yoshioka
Hayato	—N/a	Inoue (9:35)	Hayato (11:27)	Hayato (21:46)	Hayato (16:02)
Inoue	Inoue (9:35)	—N/a	Sato (2:18)	Tachibana (10:00)	Yoshioka (10:54)
Sato	Hayato (11:27)	Sato (2:18)	—N/a	Tachibana (11:32)	Sato (9:49)
Tachibana	Hayato (21:46)	Tachibana (10:00)	Tachibana (11:32)	—N/a	Yoshioka (12:08)
Yoshioka	Hayato (16:02)	Yoshioka (10:54)	Sato (9:49)	Yoshioka (12:08)	—N/a
Block B	Musashi	Tamura	Aoyagi	Abe	Doi
Musashi	—N/a	Tamura (12:28)	Musashi (16:56)	Abe (10:32)	Musashi (20:11)
Tamura	Tamura (12:28)	—N/a	Aoyagi (22:54)	Tamura (10:11)	Doi (9:27)
Aoyagi	Musashi (16:56)	Aoyagi (22:54)	—N/a	Aoyagi (15:15)	Aoyagi (17:44)
Abe	Abe (10:32)	Tamura (10:11)	Aoyagi (15:15)	—N/a	Doi (9:09)
Doi	Musashi (20:11)	Doi (9:27)	Aoyagi (17:44)	Doi (9:09)	—N/a

Final
A1	Rising Hayato	29:45
B1	Atsuki Aoyagi	Pin

=== 2026 ===
The 2026 Junior League, the second in a row under the "Zennichi Junior Festival" name, took place between August 9 and 29. Atsuki Aoyagi, the previous year's winner, was originally scheduled to compete but was pulled from the tournament due to a left ACL injury. He was replaced by Dragongate wrestler Masaaki Mochizuki, who, along with Hokuto Omori, Yuya Aoki, Yasutaka Yano, and Shota Kofuji, made his tournament debut. On the third night of the tournament, Rising Hayato suffered a concussion during his match against Seigo Tachibana, forcing him to forfeit the rest of his tournament matches.

Final standings
Block A		Block B	
Seiki Yoshioka	6	Dan Tamura	7
Seigo Tachibana	5	Masaaki Mochizuki	7
Musashi	5	Hokuto Omori	6
Yasutaka Yano	4	Yuya Aoki	6
Rising Hayato	4	"Mr. Saito" Naruki Doi	4
Leon de Oro	4	Shota Kofuji	0

Block A	Hayato	Musashi	Oro	Tachibana	Yoshioka	Yano
Hayato	—N/a	Musashi (forfeit)	Hayato (11:02)	Tachibana (21:08)	Hayato (16:40)	Yano (forfeit)
Musashi	Musashi (forfeit)	—N/a	DCO (8:23)	Draw (30:00)	Yoshioka (20:21)	Musashi (11:34)
Oro	Hayato (11:02)	DCO (8:23)	—N/a	Oro (7:24)	Oro (6:16)	Yano (10:48)
Tachibana	Tachibana (21:08)	Draw (30:00)	Oro (7:24)	—N/a	Yoshioka (17:08)	Tachibana (10:14)
Yoshioka	Hayato (16:40)	Yoshioka (20:21)	Oro (6:16)	Yoshioka (17:08)	—N/a	Yoshioka (11:10)
Yano	Yano (forfeit)	Musashi (11:34)	Yano (10:48)	Tachibana (10:14)	Yoshioka (11:10)	—N/a
Block B	Aoki	Doi	Kofuji	Mochizuki	Omori	Tamura
Aoki	—N/a	Aoki (10:40)	Aoki (13:46)	Mochizuki (13:25)	Omori (14:36)	Aoki (11:05)
Doi	Aoki (10:40)	—N/a	Doi (3:49)	Doi (7:48)	Omori (11:17)	Tamura (13:48)
Kofuji	Aoki (13:46)	Doi (3:49)	—N/a	Mochizuki (9:34)	Omori (13:27)	Tamura (12:40)
Mochizuki	Mochizuki (13:25)	Doi (7:48)	Mochizuki (9:34)	—N/a	Mochizuki (10:34)	Draw (30:00)
Omori	Omori (14:36)	Omori (11:17)	Omori (13:27)	Mochizuki (10:34)	—N/a	Tamura (16:42)
Tamura	Aoki (11:05)	Tamura (13:48)	Tamura (12:40)	Draw (30:00)	Tamura (16:42)	—N/a

Block B Decision			Final
			A1	Seigo Tachibana	Pin
B1	Dan Tamura	Pin	B1	Dan Tamura	20:14
B2	Masaaki Mochizuki	12:32
