= Yuma Aoyagi =

Japanese professional wrestler (born 1995)

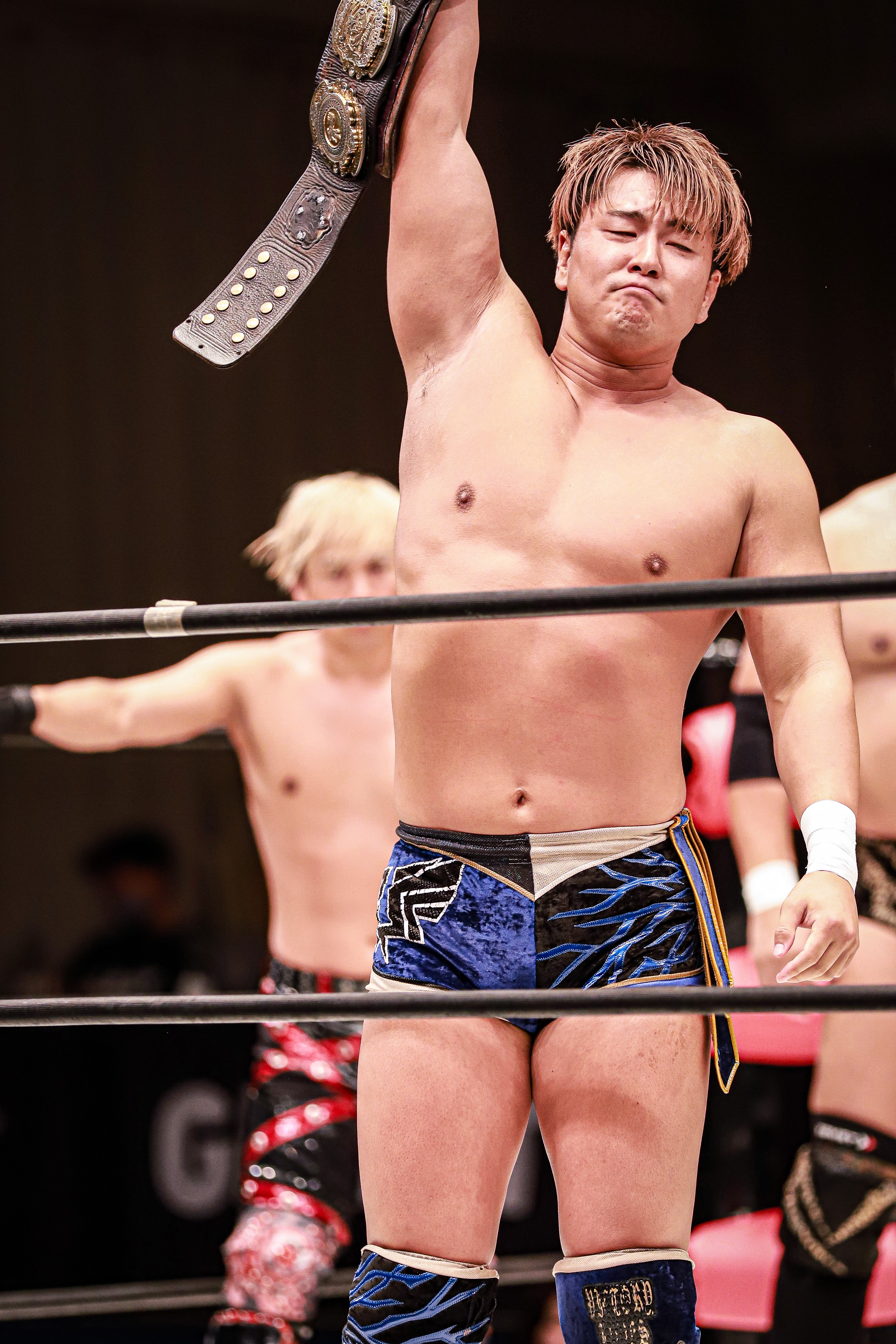
- Aoyagi in August 2023

Personal information
- Born: November 2, 1995 (age 31) Matsumoto, Nagano, Japan
- Family: Atsuki Aoyagi (brother)

Professional wrestling career
- Ring name: Yuma Aoyagi
- Billed height: 1.86 m (6 ft 1 in)
- Billed weight: 90 kg (200 lb)
- Trained by: Atsushi Aoki
- Debut: December 14, 2014

Yuma Aoyagi (青柳 優馬, Aoyagi Yūma; born November 2, 1995) is a Japanese professional wrestler. As of 2014, he is currently signed to All Japan Pro Wrestling, but is on suspension due to a car accident. A member of the Zennichi Shin Jidai stable, he is a former Triple Crown Heavyweight Champion, a two-time All Asia Tag Team Champion, and a three-time AJPW World Tag Team Champion. He is also the older brother of professional wrestler and fellow AJPW signee Atsuki Aoyagi.

== Early life ==
Yuma Aoyagi was born on November 2, 1995, in Matsumoto City, Nagano Prefecture of Japan. Up to Junior High School, Aoyagi would be playing volleyball and watching professional wrestling on television and in live venues, along with his father who also was a pro wrestling fan. While giving his high school exams at Tagawa High School in Nagano Prefecture, he would go from liking pro-wrestling to telling his parents that he was determined to become a pro wrestler.

== Professional wrestling career ==
=== All Japan Pro Wrestling (2014–present) ===
After graduating from high school, Yuma Aoyagi joined All Japan Pro Wrestling's dojo system on April 1, 2014. After 8 months in a trainee period, he made his debut as a Junior Heavyweight on December 14 losing to Kento Miyahara in Korakuen Hall. Aoyagi debuted in blue short tights reminiscent of Jun Akiyama's original debut color. It was later revealed that the tights were Akiyama's as he gave them to the young rookie as a gift for his hard work. On July 7, 2015, Aoyagi picked up his first win by defeating Naoya Nomura. At the World's Strongest Tag Determination League 2015 Aoyagi and Naoya Nomura finished with 2 points by only defeating Kenso and Osamu Nishimura.

On January 3, 2016, after Yohei Nakajima defeated Naoya Nomura for the Gaora TV Championship, Aoyagi came out and challenged Nakajima for the Gaora TV title. On January 18, Aoyagi had a match against Daisuke Sekimoto at Big Japan Wrestling (BJW)'s D-Rize. On February 12, Aoyagi lost to Yohei Nakajima and failed to win the Gaora TV Championship.

On July 20, at the New Japan Pro-Wrestling's Super J-Cup, Aoyagi lost to Suzuki-gun's Taichi at the first round. On May 4, AJPW president Jun Akiyama made a surprise appearance for Wrestle-1, facing off with Keiji Mutoh with the two agreeing to a tag team match against each other on August 11. On August 11, Wrestle-1 presented an interpromotional six-man tag team match, which saw AJPW president Jun Akiyama take on former AJPW president Keiji Mutoh. In the match, the AJPW trio of Akiyama, Naoya Nomura and Yuma Aoyagi were victorious over the Wrestle-1 trio of Mutoh, Koji Doi and Kumagoro.

After the Pro Wrestling Love PPV, Aoyagi formed a team with Nomura. On September 19, Aoyagi and Nomura lost to Kento Miyahara and Jake Lee. After the match Miyahara and Lee invited them to join Nextream which they accepted. On November 11, it was announced that Aoyagi and Nomura would participate in the World's Strongest Tag Determination League at Block B. From November 12 to 17, Aoyagi participated at the 2016 Jr. Tag Battle of Glory with the reigning World Junior Heavyweight Champion Soma Takao. Aoyagi and Takao finished the tournament with 5 points, advancing to the finals. In the finals, Aoyagi and Takao lost to Aoki and Sato. In the World's Strongest Tag Determination League, Aoyagi and Nomura tied in fourth place with two points with their only win being over Super Tiger and Sato.

On January 3, 2017, Aoyagi unsuccessfully challenged Keisuke Ishii for the World Junior Heavyweight Championship. From February 17 to 26, Aoyagi participated in the 2017 Jr. Battle of Glory where he finished in last place of his block with 3 points where he scored a win over Yohei Nakajima and went to a draw with Atsushi Maruyama. On June 18, Aoyagi with Lee and Miyahara won the Nemuro Dining Room Cup 6 Man Tag Tournament defeating Ultimo Dragon, Jun Akiyama and Takao Omori in the finals to win his first tournament in the process.

After graduating to the heavyweight division on September 12, 2017, Aoyagi and Naoya Nomura defeated Black Tiger VII and Taka Michinoku to win the All Asia Tag Team Championship on September 30. He would defend the belt four times before he would relinquish the title, after fracturing his leg in a match with Ryoji Sai on January 25, 2018. He would return on June 5 of the same year and reclaim the All Asia Tag Titles with Nomura on July 29.

On January 3, 2020, Aoyagi would storm Miyahara after a Triple Crown Heavyweight Championship defence, to challenge him for a title match. On the 11th of the same month, Aoyagi would announce that if Miyahara would beat him in a singles Championship contest, he would leave Nextream. Miyahara would do so, and thus Aoyagi would be forced to leave the stable which he had been a member of for the past years. During this time Izanagi would offer Aoyagi a place in the Purple Haze stable, yet he would decline, and would go on during this time tagging with his brother Atsuki Aoyagi.

Aoyagi would participate in the 2020 Champion Carnival, being unsuccessful by ending up with a score of 2 wins to 2 losses. In the finals of the tournament, Zeus would defeat Aoyagi's previous ally. Aoyagi would then return to Miyahara and lift him on his shoulders, and they would announce on twitter that Aoyagi would be teaming up with Miyahara in the World's Strongest tag Determination League. On December 7, 2020, Aoyagi along with Kento Miyahara would beat the team of Jake Lee and Koji Iwamoto, to win the 2020 AJPW World's Strongest Tag Determination League. On January 2, 2021, Aoyagi & Miyahara would beat the AJPW World Tag Team Champions, Shuji Ishikawa & Suwama to win the titles, in Korakuen Hall. Aoyagi would defeat Jake Lee on May 4, 2022, to win his first Champion Carnival, becoming the youngest ever winner of the tournament in the process.

== Championships and accomplishments ==
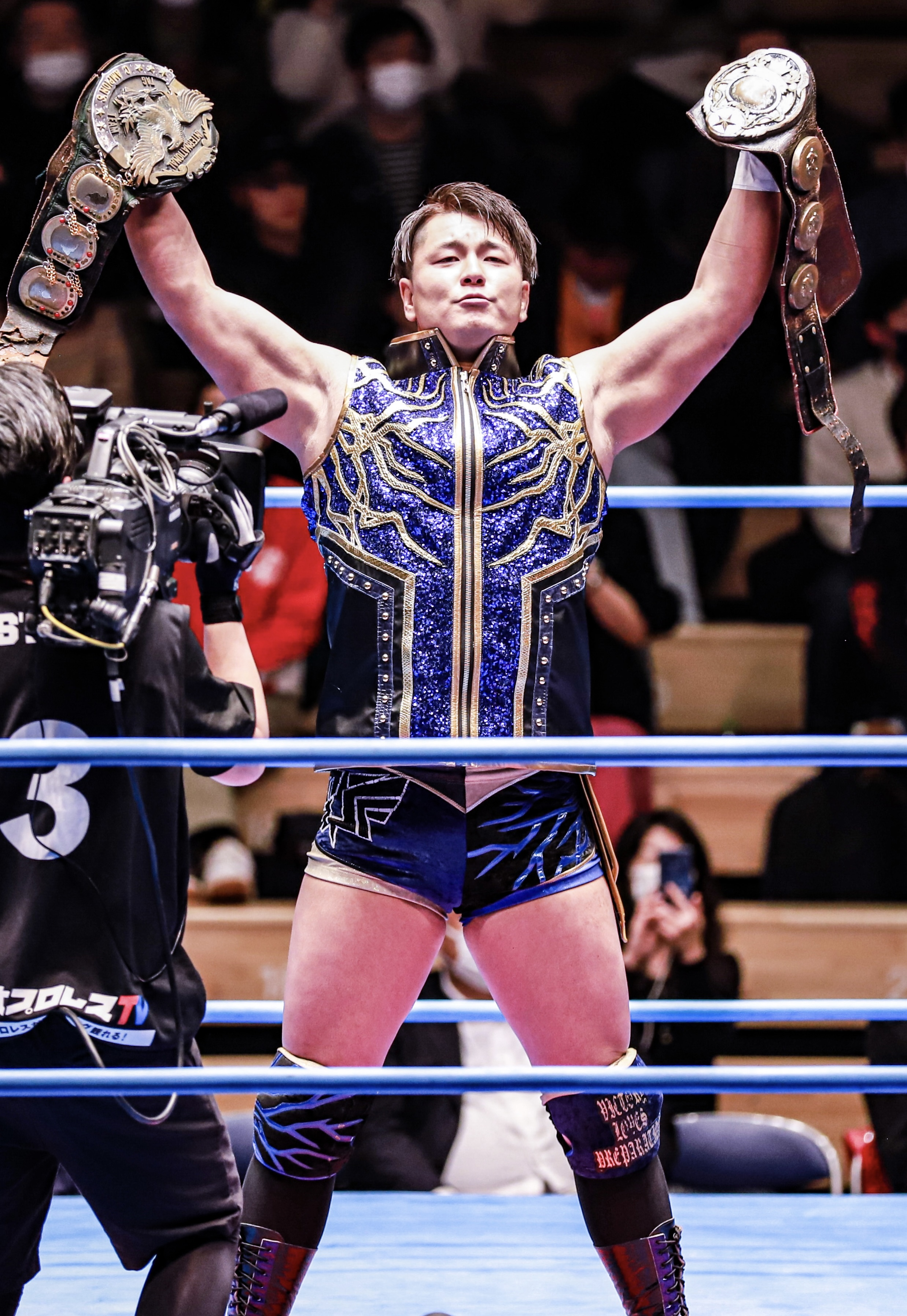
In All Japan Pro Wrestling, Aoyagi is a former World Tag Team Champion...

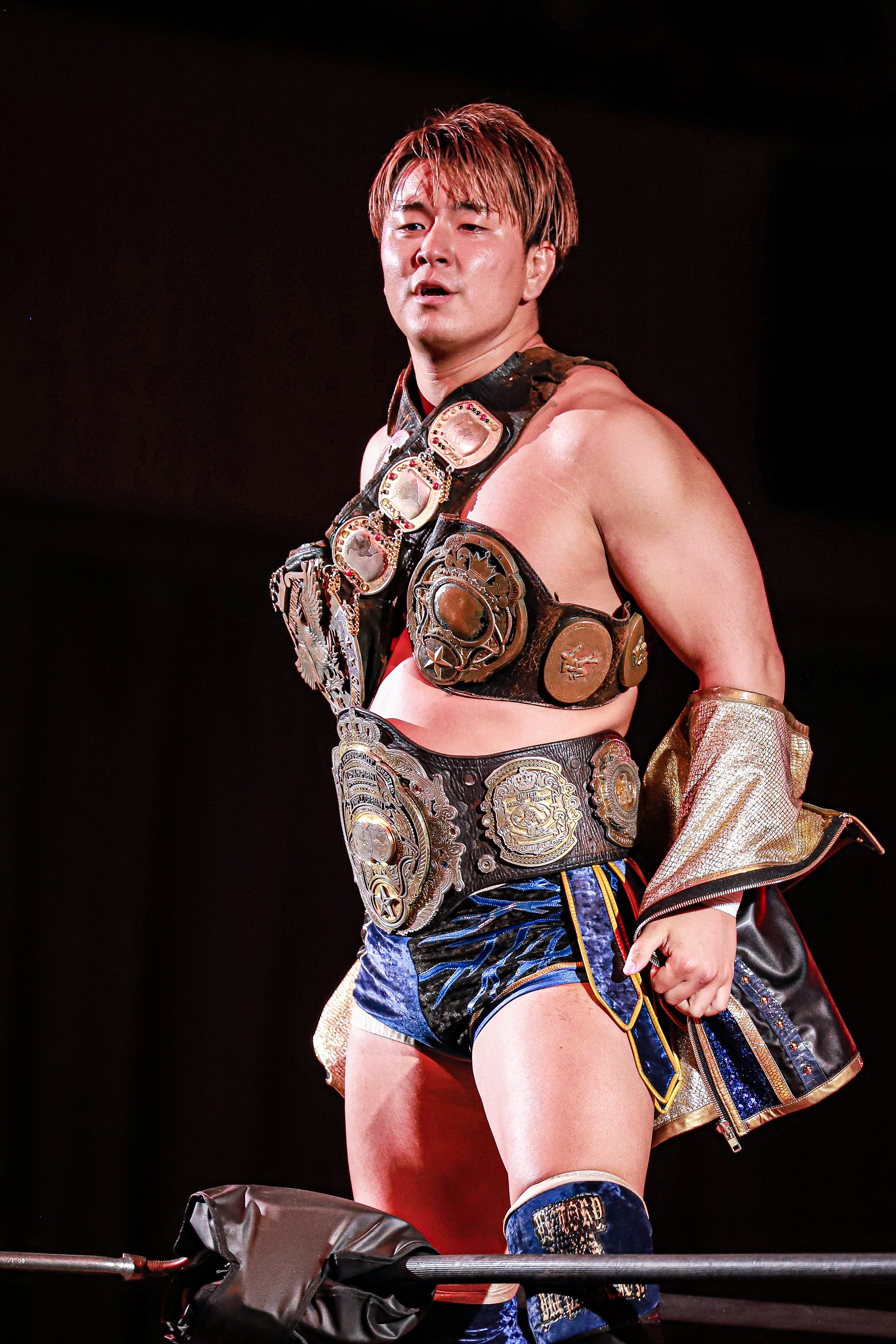
...and a Triple Crown Heavyweight Champion

- All Japan Pro Wrestling
  - Triple Crown Heavyweight Championship (2 times)
  - All Asia Tag Team Championship (3 time) – with Naoya Nomura (2) and Atsuki Aoyagi (1)
  - AJPW TV Six-Man Tag Team Championship (2 times, current) – with Fuminori Abe and Hikaru Sato(1); and Go Shiozaki and Yasukatsu Yano (1)
  - World Tag Team Championship (4 times) – with Kento Miyahara (3) and Naoya Nomura (1)
  - World's Strongest Tag Determination League (2020, 2021) – with Kento Miyahara
  - January 2 Korakuen Hall Heavyweight Battle Royal (2016)
  - Nemuro Shokudō Cup 6-Man Tag Tournament (2017) – with Kento Miyahara and Jake Lee
  - Champion Carnival (2022)
- Kaientai Dojo
  - WEW Hardcore Tag Team Championship (1 time, final) – with Kunio Toshima
- Pro Wrestling Illustrated
  - Ranked No. 94 of the top 500 singles wrestlers in the PWI 500 in 2022
- Tenryu Project
  - Tenryu Project United National Heavyweight Tag Team Championship (1 time, inaugural) – with Atsuki Aoyagi
  - Tenryu Project United National Heavyweight Tag Team Title Tournament (2023)
- Toshikoshi Puroresu
  - Toshiwasure! Shuffle Six Man Tag Team Tournament (2022) – with Yuki Ueno and Daichi Hashimoto
- Tokyo Sports
  - Newcomer Award (2017)
  - Technique Award (2023)
