= Naoya Nomura =

Japanese professional wrestler

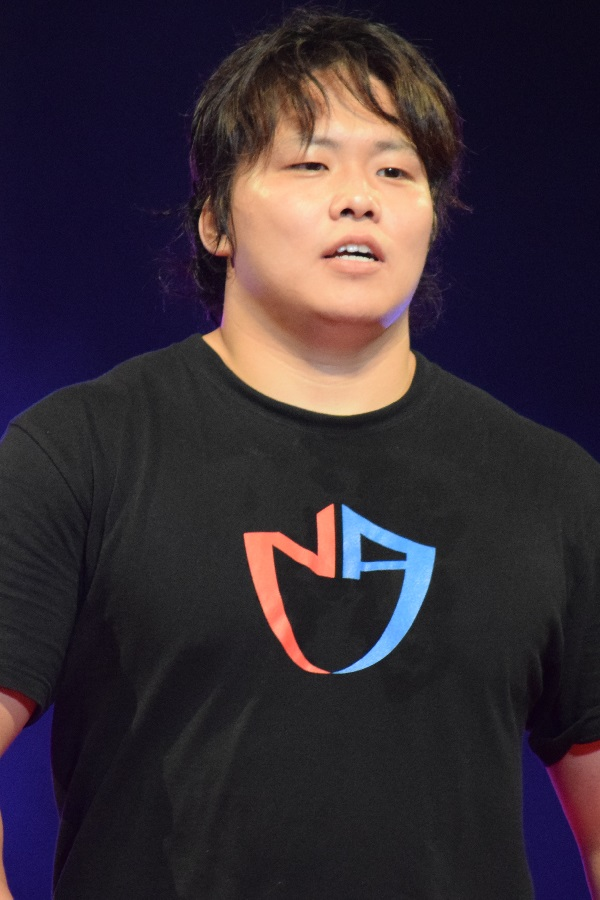
- Nomura in 2018

Personal information
- Born: October 26, 1993 (age 32) Kanazawa, Ishikawa, Japan

Professional wrestling career
- Ring name: Naoya Nomura
- Billed height: 1.85 m (6 ft 1 in)
- Billed weight: 110 kg (240 lb)
- Trained by: Atsushi Aoki; Hikaru Sato
- Debut: March 30, 2014

Naoya Nomura (born October 26, 1993) is a Japanese professional wrestler currently signed to All Japan Pro Wrestling, where he is former All Asia Tag Team and World Tag Team Champion. He also has a background in rugby.

== Early life ==
Nomura started rugby and body building during his third year in elementary school. In October 2013, he was introduced to wrestling. After the Keiji Mutoh mass exodus of All Japan Pro Wrestling, he stayed with the company and became the first trainee of the Jun Akiyama era in AJPW.

== Professional wrestling career ==
=== All Japan Pro Wrestling (2014–present) ===
On March 30, 2014, Nomura made his debut in All Japan against his teacher Atsushi Aoki. Later that year, he was sidelined with an injury but after five months of recuperating, he returned in October. On January 2, 2015 at all Japan's New Year Wars 2015 he defeated Yuma Aoyagi to pick up his first win in All Japan. On October 23, they lost to a Union Pro team of Shuji Ishikawa and Hiroshi Fukuda in their first tag team match. From November 23 to December 6, Nomura and Yuma Aoyagi participated at World's Strongest Tag Determination League and both finished the tournament with only 2 points. On the final day of the tournament after Suwama attacked Kento Miyahara, Suwama announced that Nomura was the new member of the Evolution. On January 3, Nomura had an opportunity for the Gaora TV Championship but he lost to the defending champion Yohei Nakajima. During his run in Evolution, he also changed his attire to the Evolution colors and dyed has hair blonde. from April 9 to April 23, Nomura participated in the Champion Carnival and won his first match against one of the reigning World Tag Team Champions The Bodyguard. In the end, Nomura finished the tournament with only 2 points.

On May 4, AJPW president Jun Akiyama made a surprise appearance for Wrestle-1, facing off with Keiji Mutoh with the two agreeing to a tag team match against each other on August 11. Later it was announced that Nomura and Yuma Aoyagi would be Akiyama's partner for the Pro Wrestling Love PPV. On July 30, Nomura announced that he was going to leave Evolution to start over his career. On August 11, Wrestle-1 presented an interpromotional six-man tag team match, which saw AJPW president Jun Akiyama take on former AJPW president Keiji Mutoh. In the match, the AJPW trio of Akiyama, Nomura and Yuma Aoyagi were victorious over the Wrestle-1 trio of Mutoh, Koji Doi and Kumagoro. After the Pro Wrestling Love PPV, Nomura formed a team with Yuma Aoyagi and started a feud with Doi and Kumagoro. On September 19, Nomura and Aoyagi lost to Kento Miyahara and Jake Lee. After the match Miyahara and Lee invited them to join Nextream which they accepted. On November 11, it was announced that Nomura and Aoyagi would participate in the World's Strongest Tag Determination League in Block B. In April, Nomura took part in the 2017 Champion Carnival where he would finish the tournament with 4 points, scoring wins against former Triple Crown Heavyweight Champion Takao Omori in 48 seconds and adopting a new finisher in the process: a spear and against The Bodyguard. Afterwards Nomura challenged Bodyguard to a title match for the World Tag Team Championship with his partner being his Nextream stablemate Jake Lee who defeated Bodyguard's partner Zeus. On May 12, Nomura and Lee unsuccessfully challenged Zeus and Bodyguard for the World Tag Team Championship. On July 17, Nomura and Jake Lee defeated Zeus and The Bodyguard to win the World Tag Team Championship. They relinquished the title on August 1 due to Lee suffering a knee injury.

On September 30, Nomura and Yuma Aoyagi defeated Black Tiger VII and Taka Michinoku to win the All Asia Tag Team Championship.

== Championships and accomplishments ==
- All Japan Pro Wrestling
  - All Asia Tag Team Championship (2 times) – with Yuma Aoyagi
  - World Tag Team Championship (2 times) – with Jake Lee (1) and Yuma Aoyagi (1)
- Capture International
  - Capture International Championship (1 time)
- Pro Wrestling Illustrated
  - Ranked #316 of the top 500 wrestlers in the PWI 500 in 2016
  - Ranked No. 206 of the top 500 singles wrestlers in the PWI 500 in 2019
