= Carl Malenko =

American wrestler and mixed martial arts fighter

Personal information
- Born: Carl Ognibene; January 25, 1970 (age 56) Tampa, Florida, United States

Professional wrestling career
- Ring name(s): Carl Contini; Carl Greco; Carl Malenko; Carl Ognibene; Karl Greco-Malenko; Karl Malenko; Masked Superstar
- Billed height: 5 ft 11 in (1.80 m)
- Billed weight: 200 lb (91 kg)
- Billed from: Winter Haven, Florida, United States
- Trained by: Boris Malenko; Joe Malenko; Karl Gotch
- Debut: 1993
- Retired: 2014
- Martial arts career
- Nationality: American
- Height: 5 ft 11 in (180 cm)
- Weight: 200 lb (91 kg; 14 st 4 lb)
- Style: Freestyle wrestling, Shootfighting

Carl Ognibene (born January 25, 1970) is an American professional wrestler, freestyle wrestler, and mixed martial artist who is best known as Carl Malenko. In professional wrestling, he performed for Pro Wrestling Fujiwara Gumi, Battlarts, and All Japan Pro Wrestling; in mixed martial arts (MMA), he competed in the Pride Fighting Championships and Real Fighting Championship.

== Professional wrestling career ==
Trained by Boris Malenko, Ognibene was transformed into a top flight worker like Malenko's own sons Joe and Dean. Ognibene made his professional wrestling debut in 1993 for Japanese promotion Pro Wrestling Fujiwara Gumi (PWFG) using the ring name Carl Greco. In 1996, he made his debut for PWFG's successor Battlarts. In 1999, he changed his ring name to Carl Malenko in tribute to his trainer. Ognibene was used as one of Battlarts' top gaijin wrestlers in the promotion's later years, being pushed prominently as a tag team specialist.

Ognibene began wrestling for All Japan Pro Wrestling (AJPW) in 2003 as Carl Contini. While in AJPW, Ognibene won the Junior League tournament. Ognibene wrestled his final Battlarts match in 2008. In 2011, Ognibene made his debut for Definitive Wrestling International, an American independent promotion in Florida, participating in a battle royal as Masked Superstar. He retired from wrestling in 2014.

In 2026, after almost 12 years away from wrestling, Ognibene, under the ring name Karl Greco-Malenko, returned to defeat Matt Mako during an Action Wrestling event on February 28. On April 17, Ognibene defeated Mad Dog Connelly during Action Wrestling's WrestleMania Week event.

== Championships and awards ==
- All Japan Pro Wrestling
  - Junior League (2003)
- Battlarts
  - Tag Battle (1997) - with Yuki Ishikawa
  - Battlarts Tag Team League (1999, 2000) - with Katsumi Usuda

== Mixed martial arts record ==
Professional record breakdown
| 10 matches | 6 wins | 4 losses |
| By knockout | 0 | 0 |
| By submission | 5 | 3 |
| By decision | 1 | 0 |
| Unknown | 0 | 1 |
| Draws | 0 | |

| Res. | Record | Opponent | Method | Event | Date | Round | Time | Location | Notes |
|---|---|---|---|---|---|---|---|---|---|
| Loss | 6–4 | Danny Babcock | Submission (armbar) | Real Fighting Championship 15 - Throwdown | November 1, 2008 | 2 | 4:46 | Tampa, Florida | |
| Win | 6–3 | Tony Sousa | Submission (punches) | Real Fighting Championship 11 - Revenge of the Warriors | February 23, 2008 | 2 | 1:06 | Tampa, Florida | |
| Win | 5–3 | Mike Van Meer | Submission (arm-triangle choke) | Real Fighting Championship 7 - Night of Champions | November 4, 2006 | 1 | 2:14 | Tampa, Florida | |
| Win | 4–3 | Joe Kennedy | Submission (punches) | Real Fighting Championship 6 - Battle of the Bay | September 15, 2006 | 1 | 2:59 | Tampa, Florida | |
| Win | 3–3 | George Allen | Submission (americana) | Real Fighting Championship 3 - battle of the Bay | November 11, 2005 | 2 | 1:19 | Tampa, Florida | |
| Win | 2–3 | Edwin Aguilar | Submission (arm-triangle choke) | Absolute Fighting Championships 9 | July 31, 2004 | 1 | 2:31 | Ft. Lauderdale, Florida | |
| Loss | 1–3 | Allan Goes | Submission (arm-triangle choke) | Pride 8 | November 21, 1999 | 1 | 9:16 | Tokyo, Japan | |
| Loss | 1–2 | Wanderlei Silva | Decision (unanimous) | Pride 7 | September 12, 1999 | 2 | 10:00 | Yokohama, Kanagawa, Japan | |
| Win | 1–1 | Egan Inoue | Decision (unanimous) | Pride 6 | July 4, 1999 | 3 | 5:00 | Yokohama, Kanagawa, Japan | |
| Loss | 0–1 | Ronald McSwain | N/A | World Fighting Council | May 15, 1997 | N/A | N/A | N/A | |
