= Menso-re Oyaji =

Japanese professional wrestler

Black Menso～re
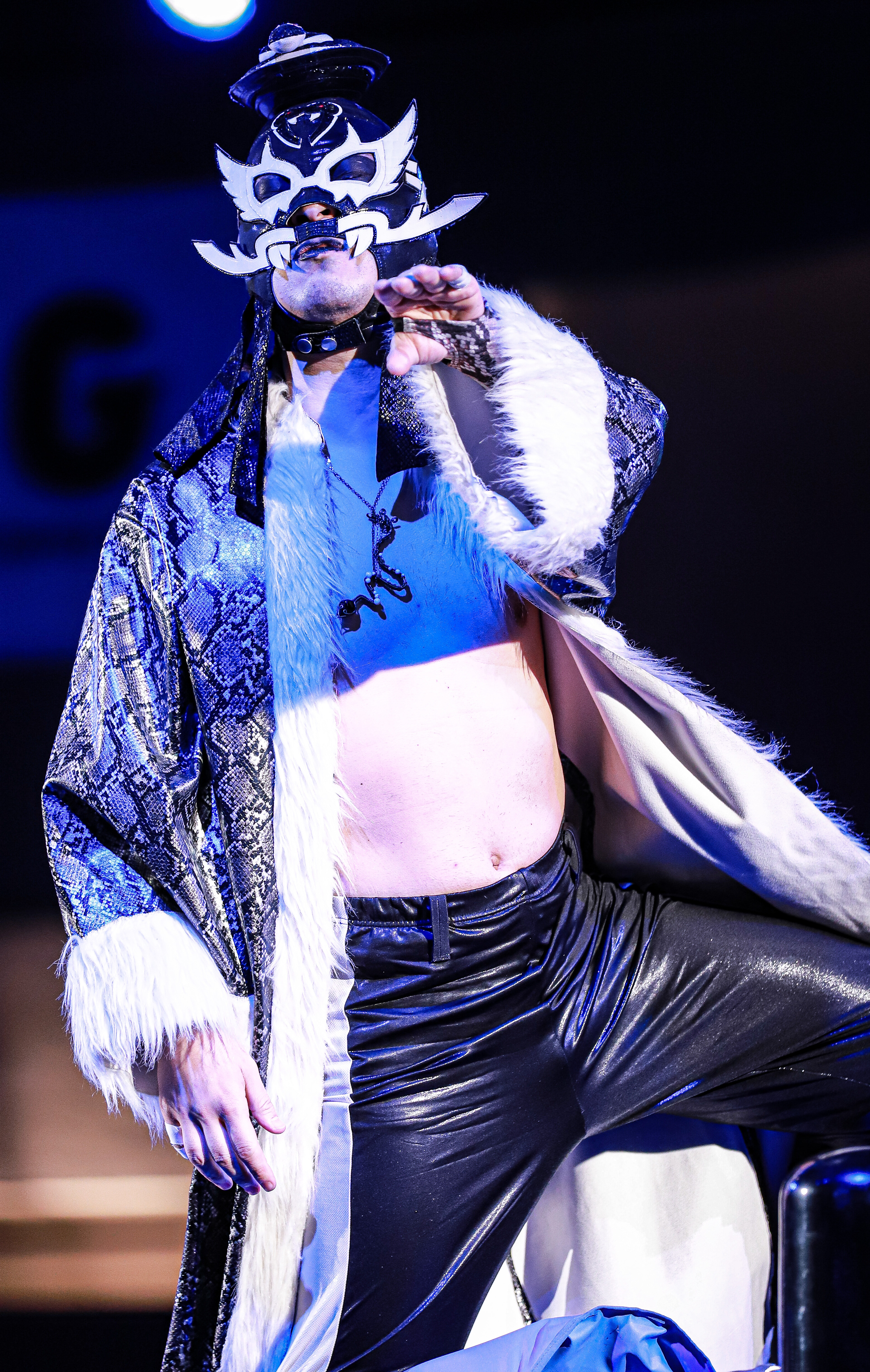
- Nakajima in August 2023

Personal information
- Born: August 22, 1985 (age 41) Hakodate, Hokkaido, Japan

Professional wrestling career
- Ring name(s): AJ Ranger Red; Menso～re Oyaji; Yohei Nakajima; Black Menso-re; Cristóbal
- Billed height: 1.72 m (5 ft 8 in)
- Billed weight: 82 kg (181 lb)
- Trained by: Okinawa Pro Wrestling
- Debut: July 5, 2008

Yohei Nakajima (中島洋平, Nakajima Yōhei; born August 22, 1985), is a Japanese professional wrestler, who performs under the masked identity Black Menso-re (ブラックめんそーれ, Burakku Mensōre). He was previously known as the similar masked character Menso～re Oyaji (めんそ～れ親父, Menso～re Oyaji), under which he performed for several independent promotions, most notably Okinawa Pro Wrestling. As Black Menso-re, he appeared for All Japan Pro Wrestling between 2014 and 2024, and became a four-time Gaora TV Champion. In 2024 he joined Pro-Wrestling NOAH, and previously worked as another masked character Cristóbal (クリストバル, Kurisutobaru) as the partner to fellow NOAH wrestler Alejandro before being revealed as Black Menso-re on October 28, 2024.

== Professional wrestling career ==
=== Okinawa Pro Wrestling (2008–2012) ===
Nakajima, under the name Menso-re Oyaji, made his professional wrestling debut on July 5, 2008 for Okinawa Pro Wrestling. He portrays a unique character, wearing a kariyushi shirt to the ring, wearing a mask that has a cartoonish bowl of Ramen noodles on top of it, and drinking a brand of beer (Orion) which is brewed in Okinawa. Oyaji's character has been described as comedic as well as "mellow" and "drunk," in some cases forgetting to put down his can of beer before wrestling a match. Essentially, Oyaji's character is a compilation of several stereotypes of Okinawan people held by those from elsewhere in Japan. "Menso～re" (めんそ～れ) is a stylisation of the okinawan word for "welcome". In addition to wrestling on Okinawa Pro Wrestling cards, Oyaji would occasionally sing for audiences who gathered to watch the company's wrestling shows.

Oyaji has received multiple title shots thus far in his wrestling career. He has challenged for the Okinawa Wrestling Championship on two separate occasions, though he has not succeeded in winning the title. Additionally, Oyaji has unsuccessfully challenged for the MWF World Junior Heavyweight Championship. Oyaji is typically featured when Okinawa Pro wrestlers compete in larger companies, including three matches on New Japan Pro Wrestling's annual "Exciting Battle in Okinawa" shows between 2009 and 2011.

Okinawa Pro Wrestling folded in late 2012.

=== Freelance (2012–2014) ===
On September 12, in his first wrestling appearance since the closure of Okinawa Pro, Oyaji lost to Kaijin Habu Otoko in the opening round of Pro Wrestling Zero1's Tenkaichi Jr. Tournament. Oyaji went on to make appearances for several major and independent promotions including All Japan Pro Wrestling, Big Japan Pro Wrestling, Kaientai Dojo, Michinoku Pro Wrestling and Union Pro Wrestling. On November 29, Oyaji and Ikuto Hidaka defeated Speed of Sounds (Hercules Senga and Tsutomu Oosugi) to win the UWA World Tag Team Championship. They lost the titles back to Speed of Sounds on July 15, 2013.

=== All Japan Pro Wrestling (2014–2024) ===
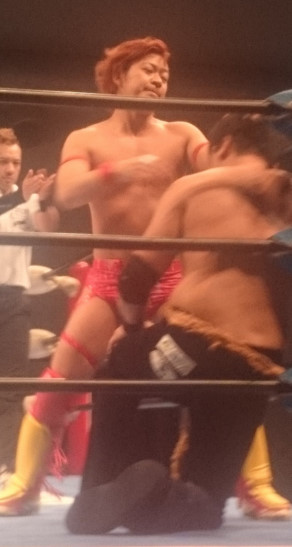
Nakajima in June 2016

On June 30, 2014, Oyaji would unsuccessfully challenge Kotaro Suzuki for the Gaora TV Championship. On July 27, after losing to Sushi, Oyaji revealed his true identity by unmasking and announced he would be working under his real name, Yohei Nakajima, from now on. Nakajima also joined Xceed with Go Shiozaki, Kento Miyahara and Kotaro Suzuki. On September 12, 2014, All Japan announced that Nakajima had signed a contract to become officially affiliated with the promotion. In October, Nakajima teamed with Suzuki to take part in the 2014 Junior Tag Battle of Glory, finishing the tournament with no wins. On August 16, 2015, Nakajima defeated Billyken Kid to win the vacant Gaora TV Championship. In October, Nakajima and Suzuki once again participated in the Junior Tag Battle Of Glory. Although they started poorly with two losses, they managed to bounce back with a time limit draw against Isami Kodaka and Yuko Miyamoto, and a win over Manjimaru and Takeshi Minamino. On November 15, Nakajima and Suzuki lost to Kodaka and Miyamoto in a decision match for the vacant All Asia Tag Team Championship. On November 16, Xceed was disbanded, when Kotaro Suzuki also announced his departure from AJPW.

On May 28, 2016, Nakajima took part in Toryumon Mexico's Dragonmanía XI event in Mexico City, where he was defeated by Jun Akiyama. After three successful title defenses, Nakajima lost the Gaora TV Championship to Kazuhiro Tamura on June 9, 2016. Nakajima regained the title six days later, before losing it to Takeshi Minamino on July 14. On August 11, Nakajima defeated Minamino in a rematch to win the Gaora TV Championship for the third time. After a nine-day reign, Nakajima lost the title to Billyken Kid. On September 19, Nakajima again regained the title from Billyken Kid. On November 27, Nakajima lost the title to Jiro Kuroshio. On February 15, 2017, after the Gaora TV Championship was vacated due to injury, AJPW president Jun Akiyama was going to award the title to the previous champion. Nakajima, however, refused as his main focus was the World Junior Heavyweight Championship and the upcoming Junior Battle of Glory Placed in the B block, Nakajima gained four points with wins over Hikaru Sato and Kazuhiro Tamura but missed out on the finals by one point. On June 16, Nakajima unsuccessfully challenged Sato for the World Junior Heavyweight Championship. On November 5, Nakajima would once again unsuccessfully challenge the World Junior Heavyweight Champion, this time losing to Tajiri.

On May 13, 2018, Menso～re Oyaji made a one night return to unsuccessfully challenge Jun Akiyama for the Gaora TV Championship. In July, Nakajima was announced with Black Tiger VII as a team in the upcoming Junior Tag Battle of Glory. On July 31, Nakajima announced he would be pulling out of the tournament due to a personal boycott of the league, as well as citing differences with Black Tiger VII. Nakajima would be repackaged as "Black Menso～re" and replaced himself as Black Tiger Vii partner; the duo finished the tournament with two wins. Black Menso～re went on to form a tag team with Takao Omori. They unsuccessfully challenged All Asia Tag Team Champions Naoya Nomura and Yuma Aoyagi on October 10 and January 3, 2019. On February 11, Menso～re and Omori unsuccessfully challenged All Asia Tag Team Champions Jake Lee and Koji Iwamoto.

== Championships and accomplishments ==
- All Japan Pro Wrestling
  - AJPW TV Six-Man Tag Team Championship (2 times, inaugural) – with Takao Omori and Carbell Ito/ATM
  - Gaora TV Championship (5 times)
- Kohaku Wrestling Wars
  - UWA World Tag Team Championship (1 time) – with Ikuto Hidaka
- Okinawa Pro Wrestling
  - MWF World Tag Team Championship (2 times) – with Kaijin Habuotoko
- Pro Wrestling Illustrated
  - Ranked No. 370 of the top 500 singles wrestlers in the PWI 500 in 2016
