= Destiny (2005) =

2005 Pro Wrestling Noah event

- Promotion: Pro Wrestling NOAH
- Date: July 18, 2005
- City: Tokyo, Japan
- Venue: Tokyo Dome
- Attendance: 62,000

Destiny chronology
← Previous; First	Next → 2015

Destiny was the first Destiny professional wrestling event produced by Pro Wrestling Noah. The event took place on July 18, 2005 at the Tokyo Dome in Tokyo, Japan, and marked Noah's second event to take place in the arena, after 2004's Departure.

The main event was marketed as the last match between longtime rivals Toshiaki Kawada and Mitsuharu Misawa, who, once both signed to All Japan Pro Wrestling (AJPW), had since gone separate ways, with Kawada remaining in All Japan and Misawa leaving to form Noah.

In other major matches on the event, Kenta Kobashi faced Kensuke Sasaki, which marked Sasaki's first appearance in his future home promotion, and Yoshinobu Kanemaru defended the GHC Junior Heavyweight Championship against Kenta. The show featured participation from other promotions, including New Japan Pro-Wrestling (NJPW), with Hiroshi Tanahashi representing the promotion to challenge Takeshi Rikio for the GHC Heavyweight Championship.

== Background ==
=== Storylines ===
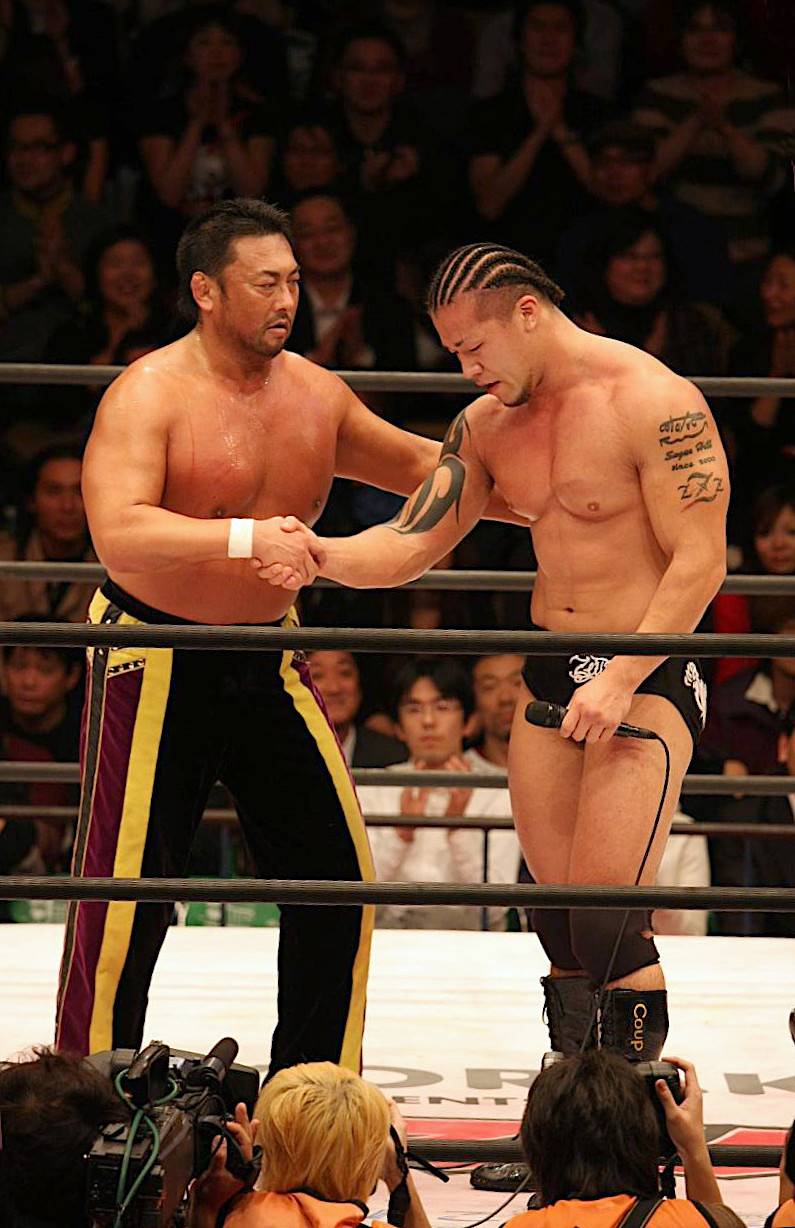
Destiny marked the first ever match-up of Toshiaki Kawada (left) in Pro Wrestling Noah.

Throughout the 1990s Toshiaki Kawada and Mitsuharu Misawa had been regarded as the two top stars of the popular All Japan Pro Wrestling (AJPW) promotion, with both men regularly headlining shows with and against each other, and feuding over the Triple Crown Heavyweight Championship throughout the decade. After owner and promoter Giant Baba died in 1999, Misawa inherited the position of AJPW president, however, after numerous disagreements with Baba's widow Motoko, he was removed from his position by a board of executives the following year and subsequently left All Japan Pro Wrestling in May 2000. Following Misawa's resignation, almost the entirety of the roster followed him in leaving and formed Pro Wrestling Noah the same year. Kawada was one of only four wrestlers to remain with All Japan, leaving him, Masanobu Fuchi, Stan Hansen and Maunakea Mossman as the sole roster of the promotion. By 2005, Kawada signed a contract with Dream Stage Entertainment, the parent company of PRIDE Fighting Championships, which allowed Kawada to work for any promotion he chose to, and opened the door for an appearance in Noah. For the first time ever, Kawada appeared in Noah on April 24, 2005 and called out Misawa for their first public meeting in over five years. Kawada challenged Misawa to "one more match" in the Tokyo Dome, which Misawa accepted, and the match was set for July 18 at Destiny, Noah's biggest event to date.

After ending Kenta Kobashi's 735 day-long GHC Heavyweight Championship reign on March 5, 2005, Takeshi Rikio successfully defended the title against Akitoshi Saito before New Japan Pro-Wrestling (NJPW)'s then-current IWGP U-30 Openweight Champion Hiroshi Tanahashi was named as his next challenger.

Having recently left NJPW for the second time in his career, Kensuke Sasaki was once again a freelancer primarily competing in AJPW and announced his intention to compete in Noah in mid-2005. He was soon confirmed to be facing Kenta Kobashi, in what was promoted as a "dream match". It marked Sasaki's first ever appearance in the promotion.

When Genichiro Tenryu was in All Japan Pro Wrestling (AJPW), Yoshinari Ogawa used to be his junior trainee until tenryu left for Super World of Sports with Ogawa not joining him, in 2005 when tenryu returned in Noah, he and ogawa had a backstage brawl, with Ogawa promising to end tenryu's career, so the match was scheduled in June 2005 with no time limit.

On 24th April 2005, Kenta faced SUWA in the budokan, with Kenta coming out victorious, after the match Suwa continues to beat Kenta until Takeshi Sugira and Yoshinobu Kanemaru came to break up the brawl, only for both to turn on kenta and form an alliance with Suwa. Kenta would make a challenge against Kanemaru for GHC Junior Heavyweight Championship at the destiny show.

== Results ==
No.	Results	Stipulations	Times
1	Masashi Aoyagi, Suwa and Takashi Sugiura defeated Katsuhiko Nakajima, Mitsuo Momota and Tsuyoshi Kikuchi	Six man tag	9:32
2	Muhammad Yone and Takeshi Morishima defeated Go Shiozaki and Tamon Honda	Tag team	8:26
3	Dark Agents (Akitoshi Saito, Kishin Kawabata and Masao Inoue) and Shiro Koshinaka defeated Akira Taue, Haruka Eigen, Jun Izumida and Takuma Sano	Eight-man tag	11:56
4	Mushiking Terry defeated Mushiking Joker	Singles match	7:59
5	Kenta defeated Yoshinobu Kanemaru (c)	Singles match for the GHC Junior Heavyweight Championship	20:31
6	Minoru Suzuki and Naomichi Marufuji (c) defeated Jun Akiyama and Makoto Hashi	Tag team match for the GHC Tag Team Championship	24:55
7	Takeshi Rikio (c) defeated Hiroshi Tanahashi	Singles match for the GHC Heavyweight Championship	17:11
8	Genichiro Tenryu defeated Yoshinari Ogawa	Singles match	10:27
9	Kenta Kobashi defeated Kensuke Sasaki	Singles match	23:38
10	Mitsuharu Misawa defeated Toshiaki Kawada	Singles match	27:04
(c) / – the champion(s) heading into the match

== Aftermath ==
Destiny would be the last time Kawada and Misawa shared a ring with each other, and the last time Kawada would appear in Noah until October 2009. Misawa died after an in-ring accident in June 2009, and Kawada would return for the Misawa memorial show.

3 years after his first appearance in Noah, Kensuke Sasaki announced his intentions to make it his own promotion, and began competing in both Noah and his own promotion Kensuke Office exclusively from 2008 onwards.

== See also ==
- Pro Wrestling Noah
