= Richard Slinger =

American professional wrestler

Personal information
- Born: Richard Aslinger; September 16, 1971 (age 55) Soddy-Daisy, Tennessee, U.S.
- Family: Terry Gordy (uncle); Ray Gordy (cousin)

Professional wrestling career
- Ring name(s): Richard Slinger; Chuck Slinger; Tornado; Karate Kid
- Billed height: 5 ft 11 in (1.80 m)
- Billed weight: 218 lb (99 kg)
- Trained by: AJPW Dojo
- Debut: August 20, 1988
- Retired: September 11, 2005

Richard Aslinger (born September 16, 1971) is an American retired professional wrestler, known by his ring name Richard Slinger. Slinger was a long-time mainstay of All Japan Pro Wrestling and later Pro Wrestling Noah, where he was one of two gaijin heels to compete in the promotion. He is also one of several Noah wrestlers to be featured in the Japanese video game King of Colosseum II.

== Professional wrestling career ==
=== All Japan Pro Wrestling (1988–1997) ===
The nephew of All Japan Pro Wrestling legend, the late Terry "Bam Bam" Gordy, Slinger became a trainee in All Japan Pro Wrestling dojo and debuted in August 1988 at the age of sixteen. He toured Japan with AJPW and a number of American wrestlers including André the Giant, Abdullah the Butcher and Giant Kimala II, Stan Hansen and Dan Spivey, Terry Gordy & Steve Williams, John Laurinaitis, Dynamite Kid and Johnny Smith, Doug Furnas, Joe and Dean Malenko and The Southern Rockers (Rex King and Steve Doll) from September 29 to October 12, 1990.

During the next year, he would continue to team with Gordy and Williams in matches against Jumbo Tsuruta, Akira Taue and Yoshinari Ogawa. In August 1991, he and Jim Brunzell also faced The Blackharts (Apocalypse and Destruction) during their first Japanese tour. He also teamed with Stan Hansen and Dan Spivey defeating Toshiaki Kawada, Kenta Kobashi and Tsuyoshi Kikuchi in Honjo, Japan on October 16, 1991.

In early 1992, Slinger won the Junior Heavyweight Battle Royal held at Korakuen Hall on January 3, 1992. That same month, he and Johnny Ace competed in the New Year's Giant Series facing The Youngbloods (Chris & Mark Youngblood) on January 26, 1992. He also participated in the '92 Excite Series teaming with Terry Gordy & Steve Williams in a 6-man tag team match against Jumbo Tsuruta, Akira Taue and Yoshinari Ogawa at Tokyo's Korakuen Hall on February 23, 1992. The next night, they lost to Stan Hansen, Johnny Ace and Buddy Lee Parker in Kurashiki and against Hansen, Ace and James Earl Wright in Kisarazu two days later. They also lost to Hansen, The Patriot and The Eagle in Oita, Japan on April 10.

He again teamed with Gordy and Williams during the '92 Super Power Series returning to Korakuen Hall to face Mitsuharu Misawa, Kenta Kobashi and Toshiaki Kawada on May 17 and, on May 25, they faced Jumbo Tsuruta, Akira Taue and Yoshinari Ogawa in a rematch at the Sendai Miyagi-ken Sports Center. This match was later aired on Japanese television at the end of the month. On June 2, the three would lose to Stan Hansen, Johnny Ace and The Patriot in Fukushima, Japan and, the following night, faced Misawa, Kawada and Kikuchi at the Niigata Shi Taiikukan.

In the '92 Summer Action Series, he teamed with The Patriot against Misawa & Kawada at Korakuen Hall on July 5. On October 4, he would team with Gordy and Williams against Mitsuhara Misawa, Kenta Kobashi and Tsuyoshi Kikuchi. For the rest of the month, he would team with Gordy and Williams several more times trading matches with Stan Hansen, Johnny Ace and several different partners including Dan Kroffat and Johnny Smith in Fuji, Okayama, Nagaoka and Mito, Japan.

On January 4, 1993, Slinger and Terry Gordy faced Akira Taue & Masa Fuchi in Tokyo and, on January 31, he teamed with Gordy and Williams to defeat Stan Hansen, Johnny Ace and Barry Horowitz. They lost to Stan Hansen, Johnny Ace and Dan Kroffat in Toyota, Japan on April 1 but defeated them in Honjo on May 15.

During the fall, he would also team with Steve Williams against Akira Taue and Toshiaki Kawada on September 3. He would also team with Williams and Bubba Rogers in 6-man tag team matches against Stan Hansen, Ted DiBiase and Dan Spivey (and later Kendall Windham) in Shizuoka, Kasumigaura and Matsumoto. They also wrestled Mitsuharu Misawa, Kenta Kobashi and Jun Akiyama in Yokosuka on November 13.

From November 13 to December 3, Slinger and Tracey Smothers competed in the 1993 World's Strongest Tag Determination League coming in last place with no points. Among the tournament's participants included Patriot and Eagle, Dan Kroffat and Doug Furnas, Danny Spivey and Johnny Ace, Toshiaki Kawada & Akira Taue, Stan Hansen and Giant Baba and winners Mitsu Misawa & Kenta Kobashi. During the tournament, he teamed with Steve Williams and Big Bubba against Mitsuharu Misawa, Kenta Kobashi and Jun Akiyama at the Niigata City Gym on November 29.

In January 1994, Slinger finished third place behind Takao Omori and Jun Akiyama for the Asunaro Cup tournament. On August 5, Slinger made a one-time appearance in Smoky Mountain Wrestling where he wrestled and was pinned by Chris Walker at the Night of Legends supercard in Knoxville, Tennessee. Returning to Japan, he teamed with Stan Hansen and Bobby Duncum, Jr. to defeat Johnny Ace, Patriot, and The Eagle in Takaoka, Japan on September 4, 1995. During the 1997 Super Power Series, he faced Mitsuharu Misawa, Kenta Kobashi and Kentaro Shiga in a six-man tag team match with Steve Williams & The Lacrosse on May 31 and teamed with Satoru Asako against Daisuke Ikeda & Yoshinobu Kanemaru at Budokan Hall on June 6, 1997. In front of 16,300 fans, Slinger won the match when he pinned Kanemaru. He would take a hiatus from wrestling.

=== Pro Wrestling Noah (2000–2005) ===
In mid-2000, after Mitsuharu Misawa left the promotion and took all but two of All Japan's natives to form Noah, Slinger was given a chance as one of the foreign regulars. On October 7, he and Scorpio faced Naomichi Marufuji and Kenta Kobayashi at the Differ Ariake in Tokyo. He and Scorpio also teamed with Vader against Mitsuharu Misawa, Yoshinari Ogawa and Naomichi Marufuji at the Yokohama Bunka Taiikukan the following night. On October 20, he wrestled Yoshinari Ogawa at the Kenei Taiikukan. He teamed with Scorpio and Vader at the last event for Noah's Voyage Navigation in November facing Takao Omori, Yoshihiro Takayama and Satoru Asako at Korakuen Hall on November 16. At the Differ Ariake during the next few weeks, he and Vader would team against Akira Taue and Jun Izumida and with Makoto Hashi against Tamon Honda and Masao Inoue.

On February 17, 2002, Slinger and Scorpio lost to Yoshinari Ogawa and Naoki Sano when Slinger was pinned by Ogawa at Budokan Hall with 16,500 in attendance. On September 7, Slinger teamed with IZU, Scorpio and Vader to defeat Kenta Kobashi, Kentaro Shiga, Daisuke Ikeda and Muhammad Yone at Noah's Navigation Over the Date Line after a near-20 minute match.

At the 2003 Navigation Over the Date Line, Slinger and Masashi Aoyagi beat Haruka Eigen and Kishin Kawabata at Budokan Hall when Slinger pinned Eigen on September 12, 2003. On September 14, Slinger participated in a one-night 6-man tag team tournament at the sold-out Hakata Star Lanes in which he joined with Maxx Justice and Superstar Steve as Team Sternness to advance to the finals against Team Burning (Akira Taue, Yoshinobu Kanemaru & Tsuyoshi Kikuchi). Slinger's team lost after Kikuchi used the fireball against Superstar Steve. On September 17, during the Noah's Navigation Against The Current tour, he and Tsuyoshi Kikuchi lost to KENTA and Takashi Sugiura at the Hiroshima Sports Center when he was pinned by Sugiura after a 10-minute match. Two days later, he teamed with IZU and Maxx Justice in a six-man tag team match against Scorpio, Michael Modest and Donovan Morgan at the Aichi Prefectural Gymnasium. These matches were later shown on Nippon TV.

On October 12, 2003, Slinger & Ricky Marvin lost to Muhammad Yone & Makoto Hashi at the sold-out Koshigaya Katsura Studio in Saitama, Japan. At Noah's Navigation Against The Current, Slinger defeated Marufuji, KENTA and Kotaro Suzuki in a 6-man tag team match with Juventud Guerrera and Ricky Marvin on October 24.

On January 10, 2004, Slinger and Donovan Morgan defeated Masashi Aoyagi & Mitsuo Momota at Budokan Hall attended by 16,000 fans. On July 10, at Noah's first show at the legendary Tokyo Dome, Slinger and Scorpio defeated Akitoshi Saito & Makoto Hashi at Noah PPV Departure 2004 when Slinger pinned Hashi in front of 50,000 fans at the Tokyo Dome. At the November 28, 2004 Sapporo show, Slinger aligned himself with Mitsuharu Misawa, Yoshinari Ogawa & Kotaro Suzuki by helping them fend off the post-match attack orchestrated by Scorpio. That same year, he was one of several Noah wrestlers to appear as a playable character in the Japanese video game King of Colosseum II.

On April 24, 2005, Slinger lost to former ally Scorpio, Michael Modest and Donovan Morgan when he teamed against them in a 6-man tag team match with Yoshinari Ogawa and Tsuyoshi Kikuchi at Budokan Hall. On May 29, Slinger teamed with Yoshinari Ogawa to defeat KENTA and Tsuyoshi Kikuchi. In a six-man tag team match with Yoshinari Ogawa and Mitsuharu Misawa two days later, he lost to Akitoshi Saito, Masao Inoue and Takashi Sugiura. In August, he and Low Ki received a shot against GHC Junior Heavyweight Tag Team Champions Yoshinobu Kanemaru and Takashi Sugiura but failed to win the titles. After the tour, he quietly retired in 2005.

== Outside of wrestling ==
Between his last days in AJPW and starting out in NOAH, Aslinger started a bail bonding business and became involved in the United States Armed Forces. In 1998, he joined the United States Air Force, where he would serve until 2004. He would later join the United States Army's Reserves, where he serves as an honor guard, attending funerals of fallen American war heroes and firing the 21-gun salutes for the fallen.

== Championship and accomplishments ==
- All Japan Pro Wrestling
  - January 3 Korakuen Hall Junior Heavyweight Battle Royal (1992)
