= Kensuke Sasaki =

Japanese professional wrestler and mixed martial artist

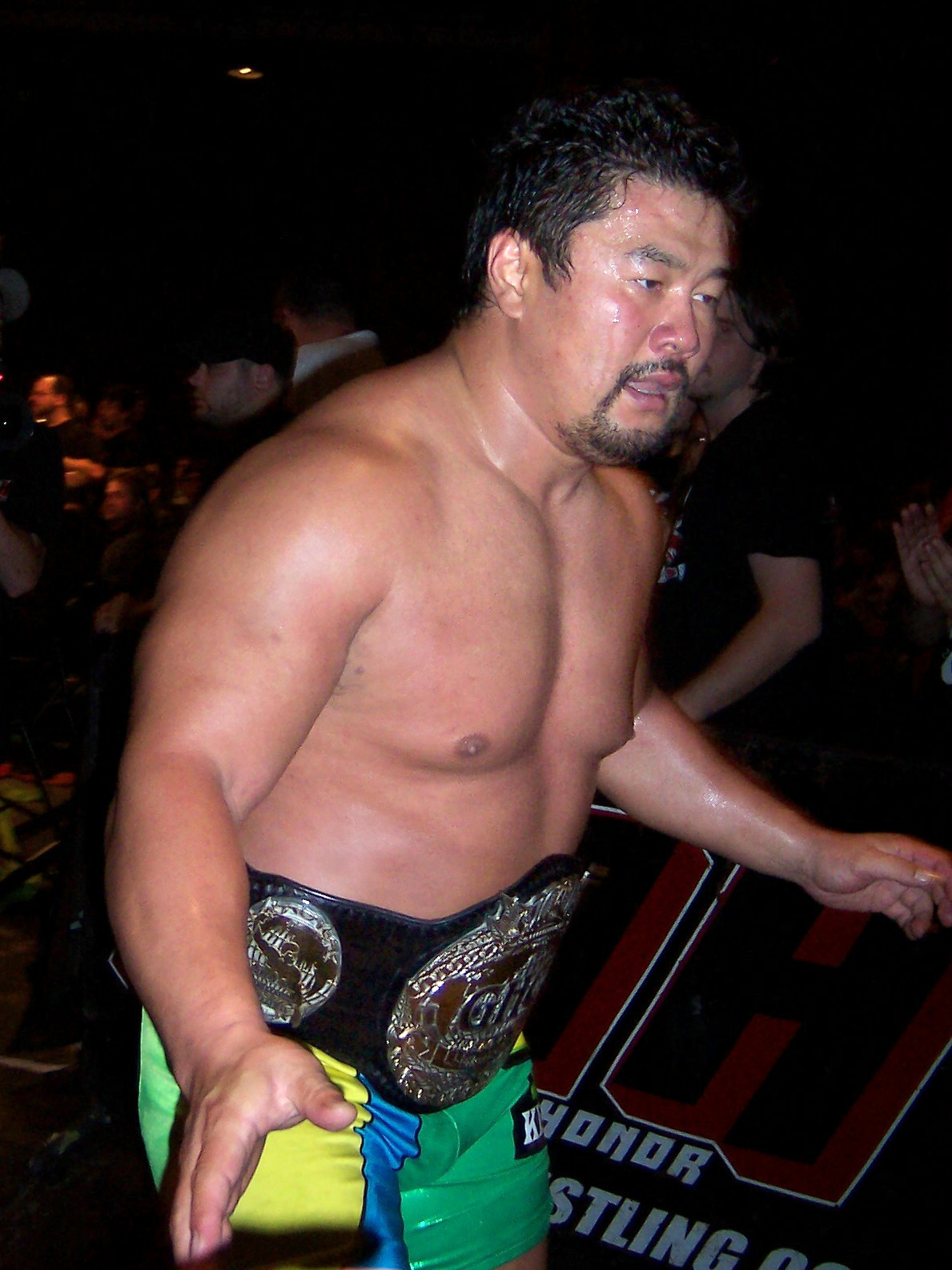
- Sasaki as GHC Heavyweight Champion in 2008

Personal information
- Born: August 4, 1966 (age 60) Fukuoka, Fukuoka, Japan
- Spouse: Akira Hokuto (m. 1995)
- Children: 2
- Relative: Rin Kadokura (daughter-in-law)

Professional wrestling career
- Ring name(s): Benkei Sasaki; Kendo Sasaki; Kensuke Sasaki; Kensuki Sasaki; Masked Volcano; Power Warrior
- Billed height: 1.80 m (5 ft 11 in)
- Billed weight: 115 kg (254 lb)
- Trained by: Tokyo Joe
- Debut: February 16, 1986
- Retired: February 13, 2014

Kensuke Sasaki (Japanese: 佐々木 健介, Sasaki Kensuke; born August 4, 1966) is a Japanese retired professional wrestler. He is best known for his numerous runs in the top three Japanese wrestling promotions; New Japan Pro-Wrestling (NJPW), All Japan Pro Wrestling (AJPW), and Pro Wrestling Noah. He was the founder and owner of the now-defunct wrestling promotion Diamond Ring, which was also named Kensuke Office.

Sasaki is the first of five men ever to hold all three of puroresu's major heavyweight titles (the IWGP Heavyweight Championship, the Triple Crown Heavyweight Championship, and the GHC Heavyweight Championship), the others being Yoshihiro Takayama, Keiji Muto, Satoshi Kojima, and Yuji Nagata - totaling seven world championship reigns. Sasaki also competed in MMA and won both fights by submission, remaining undefeated in mixed martial arts competition.

== Professional wrestling career ==
=== Early years (1986–1989) ===
Sasaki debuted in Riki Choshu's Japan Pro-Wrestling, a satellite of All Japan Pro Wrestling (AJPW), in February 1986. On February 16, 1986, he made his debut against Shinji Sasazaki in a losing effort. Shortly afterwards, Sasaki became a regular in AJPW for over a year.

He defected to rival promotion New Japan Pro-Wrestling (NJPW), following Choshu, who returned to NJPW in 1987. During his time with NJPW, Sasaki teamed up with the likes of Osamu Matsuda and Kenichi Oya.

=== International excursion (1989–1990) ===
In January 1989, Sasaki embarked on an excursion to North America. He first started wrestling there in Puerto Rico in World Wrestling Council (WWC), where he held his very first championship, the WWC Caribbean Tag Team Championship, with Mr. Pogo twice between January 14, 1989, and April 1, 1989.

He also wrestled for Stu Hart's Stampede Wrestling promotion in Canada, where he wrestled under the name Benkei Sasaki and was trained by Hart in the Hart Dungeon. During his time in Canada, he won the Stampede International Tag Team Championship in August 1989, with All Japan loyalist Sumo Hara.

He also wrestled for Otto Wanz's Catch Wrestling Association (CWA) in tours of Austria and Germany under the name Kendo Sasaki from October to December 1989.

In December 1989, Stampede Wrestling closed its doors, and Sasaki wrestled for the Canadian National Wrestling Alliance (CNWA), until March 1990 when he was fired by Ed Whalen for kicking Mike Lozanski too stiff.

=== New Japan Pro-Wrestling and World Championship Wrestling (1990–2002) ===
==== Teaming with Hiroshi Hase (1990–1992) ====
Sasaki returned to NJPW in March 1990, and formed a popular tag team with Hiroshi Hase, with whom he would have a long on-off tag team partnership. They quickly won the IWGP Tag Team Championships on November 11, 1990, defeating the team of Keiji Muto and Masahiro Chono. Holding the titles for only a month facing teams like Super Strong Machine and Tatsutoshi Goto, The Dragon Bombers (Shiro Koshinaka and Takayuki Iizuka) before eventually falling to Hiro Saito and Super Strong Machine on December 26 that same year. He would only win one more title with Hiroshi Hase a few months later; however, that was very brief, lasting only 15 days. The pair would have two reigns as IWGP Tag Team Champions, and had memorable matches with The Steiner Brothers.

==== Hell Raisers (1992–1996) ====
Two more tag title reigns followed when in late 1992, Sasaki assumed the name "Power Warrior" and teamed with Road Warrior Hawk. As The Hell Raisers, they dominated the tag team scene in New Japan. In October 1992, he also started wrestling periodically for World Championship Wrestling (WCW), and would wrestle there on and off until December 1996.

Sasaki dropped the Power Warrior persona in 1995 (as he only revived the persona on special occasions, such as teaming with Hawk and Animal in six-man tag team matches) and began climbing the ranks in singles competition. He won his first major title, the WCW United States Heavyweight Championship on November 13, 1995, defeating Sting at a NJPW Event. This was the title's first title change outside of the United States. He soon lost the title to dubious circumstances however, losing to One Man Gang which was later claimed to be an official title match.

==== IWGP Heavyweight Champion (1997–2002) ====
August 1997 skyrocketed Sasaki's rise to superstardom. On August 3, he won the G1 Climax tournament by defeating Hiroyoshi Tenzan in the final. A week later, he captured the IWGP Tag Team Championship with Kazuo Yamazaki. Finally at the end of the month, he captured the IWGP Heavyweight Championship by defeating long reigning champion Shinya Hashimoto, winning three major honors in a one-month span. Sasaki solidified his dominance in the heavyweight division by defeating both Masahiro Chono and Keiji Mutoh in his first two title defenses, thus defeating The Three Musketeers in three straight title matches. In April 1998, he lost the title to Tatsumi Fujinami. In March 1999, he won another IWGP Tag Team Championship with Shiro Koshinaka.

Sasaki won his second IWGP Heavyweight Championship from Genichiro Tenryu while wrestling with a 39 °C (102.2 °F) fever. He won the G1 Climax for the second time in August 2000 with a victory over last year's winner Manabu Nakanishi in the final, now holding both of New Japan's two heavyweight singles crowns. On October 9, 2000, Sasaki surrendered the IWGP title after he lost to Toshiaki Kawada in a non-title match at an All Japan vs. New Japan event called Do Judge. In a tournament final, Sasaki regained the title, defeating Kawada, at the January 4, 2001, Tokyo Dome show. In March 2001, Sasaki lost the IWGP Heavyweight Title to Scott Norton and in late 2002 he resigned from the promotion after a falling out with company management.

=== Fighting of World Japan Pro Wrestling (2003–2004) ===
In the beginning of 2003, Sasaki joined his mentor, Riki Choshu, in his new Fighting of World Japan Pro Wrestling (World Japan) promotion. He became the only WMG Heavyweight Champion; however, tensions between him and Choshu over financial issues caused Sasaki to withdraw and the company to die a slow death.

=== Freelancing (2004–2014) ===
==== New Japan Pro-Wrestling (2004–2005) ====
After leaving World Japan, Sasaki initially returned to NJPW in 2004 as a heel freelancer, with the New Japan roster, specifically Yuji Nagata unwelcoming of his return in kayfabe. In his return match, Sasaki lost to Nagata at Wrestling World 2004 by referee's decision in an extremely bloody contest. He later aligned himself with Manabu Nakanishi, who had recently begun his "lone wolf" character. The two formed a tag team known as Pirates Gundan (Pirates Army), and regularly teamed with the likes of Scott Norton and Genichiro Tenryu. On March 12, he won back the IWGP Heavyweight Championship, defeating Hiroyoshi Tenzan in Tokyo. Sasaki dropped the title to Bob Sapp a little over two weeks later. After introducing his student Katsuhiko Nakajima and forming the Kensuke Family group, Sasaki began a redemption storyline where he attempted to win back the support of both the wrestlers and fans in NJPW. In August, he entered his first G1 Climax since 2002, but was prevented from reaching the finals by losing to Tenryu on the final day. By October, Sasaki was once again a firm fan favourite, and regained the IWGP Heavyweight Championship in controversial fashion, beating Kazuyuki Fujita in just 2:29 after reversing a sleeper into a pinfall. This win was legitimately protested by Sasaki and his wife Akira Hokuto, who destroyed the trophy given to Sasaki backstage and criticised Fujita for purposely dropping the championship so he could focus on MMA. Nevertheless, Kensuke successfully defended the belt twice against Hiroshi Tanahashi and Minoru Suzuki, before dropping it to Tenzan in December. After dropping the IWGP Title again, ally turned enemy Riki Choshu returned to NJPW in a backstage role which led to Sasaki's appearances became more sporadic, and he stopped wrestling for NJPW once again in early 2005.

==== All Japan Pro Wrestling (2005–2008) ====
After returning to NJPW, Sasaki once again started wrestling for AJPW too as a freelancer, entering the 2004 Champion Carnival and making it to the final where he lost to Keiji Mutoh. After making occasional appearances throughout 2004, Sasaki went over to AJPW full-time in early 2005. On January 16, he unsuccessfully challenged Toshiaki Kawada for the Triple Crown Heavyweight Championship, but saw success throughout the year, first winning the Champion Carnival by beating Jamal in the final. On July 26, Sasaki and his student Katsuhiko Nakajima then beat the Voodoo Murders ("brother" Yasshi and Shuji Kondo) to win the All Asia Tag Team Championship. Kensuke (as his old "Power Warrior" character) and Road Warrior Animal teamed up on September 1 at the Differ Ariake to defeat Yasshi and Kondo. On November 19, Sasaki got another shot at the Triple Crown, this time losing to Satoshi Kojima. In July 2006, Sasaki suffered an injury and required time off, meaning he and Nakajima had to vacate the All Asia Tag Titles.

After five months away from the ring, Sasaki returned to All Japan in January 2007. In May, Sasaki and Nakajima teamed up with rookie Seiya Sanada to win the Samurai! TV Triple Arrow Six Man Tag Team Cup, beating the Voodoo Murders (Kondo, Yasshi and Taru) in the final. On August 26, 2007, Sasaki defeated Minoru Suzuki to become the Triple Crown Heavyweight Champion. Sasaki made his first defense against Toshiaki Kawada on October 18, 2007, and would go on to team with Kawada after Katsuhiko Nakajima suffered an injury on October 18 in the 2007 World's Strongest Tag Determination League. Sasaki and Kawada would lose a Finals Decision match against Satoshi Kojima and Suwama on December 9; both teams were tied, and opponents were needed for Keiji Muto and Joe Doering in the final of the League.

Sasaki successfully defended the Triple Crown Championship against Satoshi Kojima (on March 1, 2008). Sasaki participated in the 2008 Champion Carnival over five straight shows in the Korakuen Hall from April 5 to April 9, scoring 4 points after 1 win (over Joe Doering), 1 loss (to Minoru Suzuki) and 2 draws (with Suwama and Osamu Nishimura). Sasaki lost the Triple Crown Championship to Carnival Winner Suwama on April 29, 2008, and left the promotion in June.

==== Pro Wrestling Noah (2008–2013) ====
Sasaki debuted for Pro Wrestling Noah in 2005, losing to Kenta Kobashi at Destiny 2005. After losing the Triple Crown titles in 2008, he jumped to Pro Wrestling Noah and announced he would make it his full-time home promotion, while still operating the Kensuke Office. On September 6, 2008, he defeated Takeshi Morishima for the GHC Heavyweight Title, becoming the first person to hold the Heavyweight title in all three major Japanese promotions. On March 1, 2009, he lost the GHC Heavyweight title to Jun Akiyama. On September 21, 2009, he teamed with Morishima to win the GHC Tag Team titles from Akitoshi Saito and Bison Smith. They lost the titles on December 6, 2009, to Takeshi Rikio and Muhammad Yone.

Sasaki teamed up with regular tag partner Takeshi Morishima to participate in the Global Tag League of 2010, which ran from January 9 to January 24. Sasaki and Morishima finished the league with a total of four points, losing out to A-Block winners Yoshihiro Takayama and Takuma Sano. Sasaki also participated in Pro-Wrestling NOAH's Global League of 2010 from March 28 to May 2. During the league, he defeated Jun Akiyama in a highly acclaimed contest. Sasaki finished with a total of seven points, losing out to eventual winner Yoshihiro Takayama.

=== Diamond Ring (2005–2014) ===
In 2005, Sasaki established his own agency, Kensuke Office. The agency is run by Sasaki's wife (former joshi wrestler), Akira Hokuto. Under the Kensuke Office agency, Sasaki and pupil Katsuhiko Nakajima toured other promotions, particularly All Japan Pro Wrestling and Pro Wrestling Noah (PWN).

In September 2006, Kensuke Office was announced as a member of the Global Professional Wrestling Alliance (GPWA). Beginning in 2007, Kensuke Office has organised its own shows, and some of the talent featured on the shows include Minoru Suzuki, Jun Akiyama, Genichiro Tenryu, Yoshihiro Takayama, Kikutaro, Takeshi Morishima, KENTA and Catfish Man. In January 2012, Kensuke Office was renamed Diamond Ring. Currently, Diamond Ring serves as developmental territory of Pro Wrestling NOAH, featuring several of its superstars.

On February 11, 2014, Sasaki suffered his first loss to Katsuhiko Nakajima in the main event of a Diamond Ring event. Two days later, Sasaki held a press conference to announce his retirement from professional wrestling. Following Sasaki's retirement, Diamond Ring was left with only one remaining wrestler, Katsuhiko Nakajima, with Satoshi Kajiwara resigning and Mitsuhiro Kitamiya joining Pro Wrestling Noah.

== Mixed martial arts career ==
Kensuke Sasaki
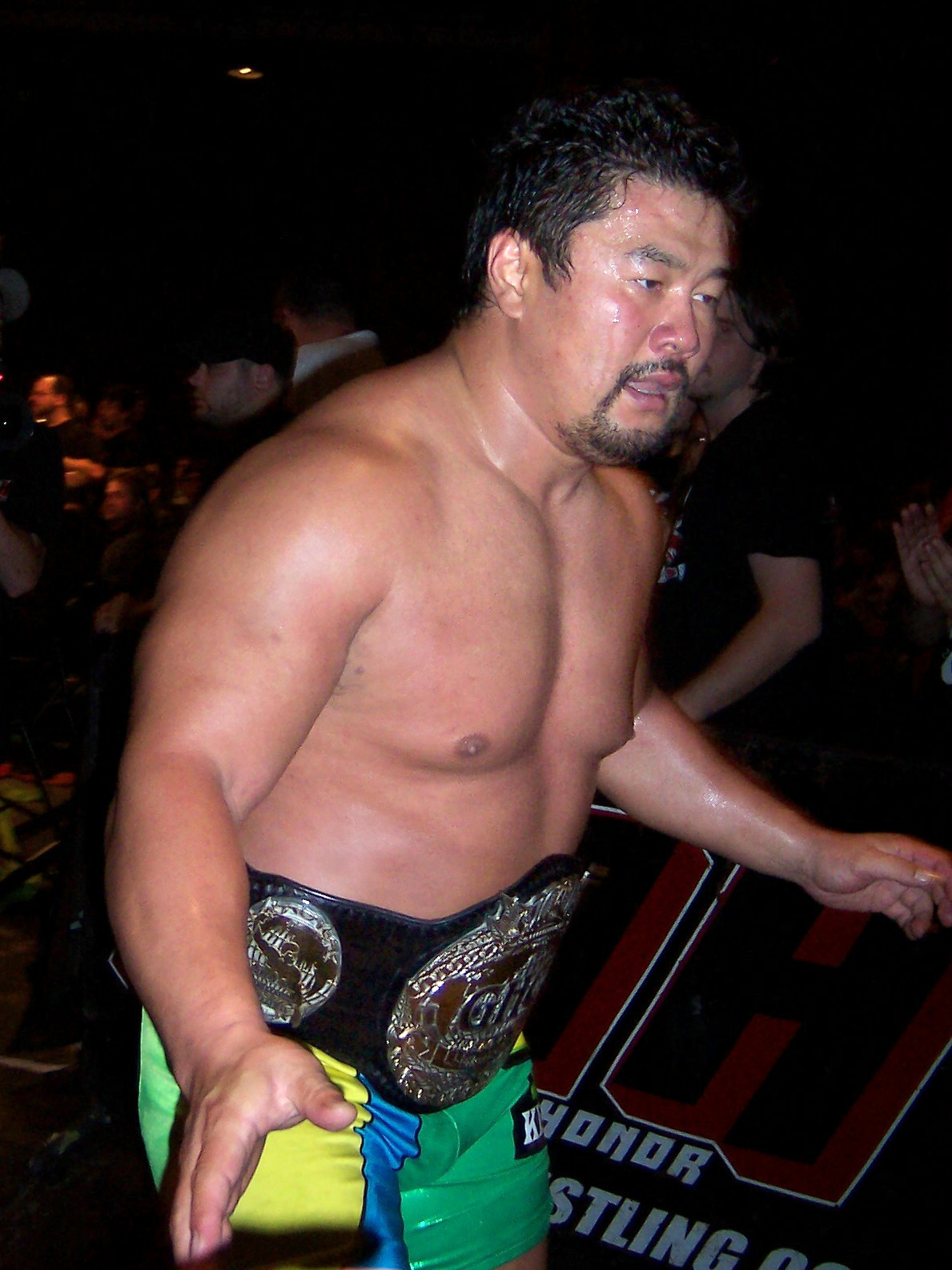
- Division: Heavyweight
- Style: Wrestling
- Stance: Orthodox
- Years active: 2001–2003 (MMA)

Mixed martial arts record
- Total: 2
- Wins: 2
- By submission: 2
- Losses: 0

Between 2001 and 2003, Sasaki took a couple hiatuses from pro-wrestling and focused on mixed martial arts. He has two fights under his belt, winning both by submission in the first round beating Dan Chase in 2001 and future UFC fighter Christian Wellisch in 2003. In November 2002, he was originally scheduled to fight Minoru Suzuki, but due to injury, he pulled out and was replaced by Jushin Thunder Liger.

During this period, he would alter his look, cutting his signature mullet (he would occasionally dye his hair different colors), wearing ring gear bearing the word, "Volcano", and adapting moves he learned in MMA training to expand his pro wrestling moveset.

In March 2004, Sasaki defeated Francisco Filho in a sumo-style match for K-1.

=== Mixed martial arts record ===
Professional record breakdown
2 matches	2 wins	0 losses
By knockout	0	0
By submission	2	0
By decision	0	0
Draws	0	

Res.	Record	Opponent	Method	Event	Date	Round	Time	Location	Notes
Win	2–0	Christian Wellisch	Submission (guillotine choke)	X-1	September 6, 2003	1	2:35	Yokohama, Kanagawa, Japan	
Win	1–0	Dan Chase	Submission (armbar)	GC5: Rumble in the Rockies	August 19, 2001	1	0:36	Denver, Colorado, United States	

== Personal life ==
Kensuke Sasaki married Akira Hokuto on October 1, 1995, after proposing to her on their first date. Together, they have two sons: Kennosuke (born November 1998) and Seinnosuke (born March 2003). Kennosuke married professional wrestler Rin Kadokura in 2022.

== Championships and accomplishments ==
- All Japan Pro Wrestling
  - All Asia Tag Team Championship (1 time) – with Katsuhiko Nakajima
  - Triple Crown Heavyweight Championship (1 time)
  - Champion Carnival (2005)
  - January 2 Korakuen Hall Heavyweight Battle Royal (2007)
  - SAMURAI! TV Cup Triple Arrow Tournament (2007) – with Katsuhiko Nakajima and Seiya Sanada
  - BAPE STA!! PRO-WRESTLING a-k-a Tournament (2004)
- Dramatic Dream Team
  - KO-D 6-Man Tag Team Championship (1 time) – with Danshoku Dino and Makoto Oishi
- Fighting of World Japan Pro Wrestling
  - World Magma the Greatest Championship (1 time)
  - WJ Strongest Tournament (2003)
- Hawai'i Championship Wrestling
  - HCW Kamehameha Heritage World Heavyweight Championship (1 time)
  - HCW Kekaulike Heritage Tag Team Championship (2 times) – with Kenjiro Katahira
- Michinoku Pro Wrestling
  - Tohoku Tag Team Championship (1 time) – with Katsuhiko Nakajima
- New Japan Pro-Wrestling
  - IWGP Heavyweight Championship (5 times)
  - IWGP Tag Team Championship (7 times) – with Hiroshi Hase (2), Hawk Warrior (2), Riki Choshu (1), Kazuo Yamazaki (1) and Shiro Koshinaka (1)
  - G1 Climax (1997, 2000)
  - G1 Climax Special Tag Team Tournament (1997) – with Kazuo Yamazaki
  - Japan/United States All Star Tournament (1996)
  - WCW World Tag Team Title Contenders League (1998) – with Yuji Nagata
  - IWGP Heavyweight Championship #1 Contenders Tournament (1999)
  - IWGP Heavyweight Championship Tournament (2001)
  - MVP Award (2000)
  - Singles Best Bout (2000) vs. Toshiaki Kawada on October 9
  - SKY PerfecTV! Cup (2001)
- Nikkan Sports
  - Match of the Year (2000) vs. Toshiaki Kawada on October 9
  - Match of the Year (2005) vs. Kenta Kobashi on July 18
  - Outstanding Performance Award (1997, 2004, 2008)
  - Fighting Spirit Award (2004)
- Pro Wrestling Illustrated
  - Ranked No. 10 of the top 500 singles wrestlers in the PWI 500 in 2000
  - Ranked No. 103 of the top 500 singles wrestlers of the "PWI Years" in 2003
  - Ranked No. 27 of the top 100 tag teams during the "PWI Years" with Hiroshi Hase in 2003
- Pro Wrestling Noah
  - GHC Heavyweight Championship (1 time)
  - GHC Tag Team Championship (1 time) – with Takeshi Morishima
  - One Night Six Man Tag Tournament (2012) – with Kento Miyahara and Takeshi Morishima
  - Global Tag League Outstanding Performance Award (2013) – with Katsuhiko Nakajima
- Stampede Wrestling
  - Stampede Wrestling International Tag Team Championship (1 time) – with Sumo Hara
- Tokyo Sports
  - Lifetime Achievement Award (2014)
  - Match of the Year (2000) vs. Toshiaki Kawada on October 9
  - Match of the Year (2005) vs. Kenta Kobashi on July 18
  - Outstanding Performance Award (2008)
  - Wrestler of the Year (2004)
- Toryumon Mexico
  - UWA World Tag Team Championship (1 time) – with Animal Warrior
  - Suzuki Cup (2007) – with Marco Corleone and Ultimo Dragon
- World Championship Wrestling
  - WCW United States Heavyweight Championship (1 time) (Note: Sasaki won the championship in Tokyo, Japan as part of an interpromotional card between New Japan Pro-Wrestling and World Championship Wrestling.)
- World Wrestling Council
  - WWC Caribbean Tag Team Championship (2 times) – with Mr. Pogo
- Wrestling Observer Newsletter
  - Match of the Year (1991) with Hiroshi Hase vs. Rick Steiner and Scott Steiner at the WCW/New Japan Supershow
  - Wrestling Observer Newsletter Hall of Fame (Class of 2013)
