= Kentaro Shiga =

Japanese professional wrestler (born 1974)

Personal information
- Born: December 6, 1974 (age 51) Hitachinaka, Ibaraki, Japan

Professional wrestling career
- Ring name(s): Kentaro Shiga; Punch The C The Great Zebra
- Billed height: 1.88 m (6 ft 2 in)
- Billed weight: 99 kg (218 lb)
- Trained by: Giant Baba; Tamon Honda; Jun Akiyama; Kenta Kobashi; AJPW Dojo
- Debut: February 21, 1994

Kentaro Shiga (志賀 賢太郎, Shiga Kentaro) is a Japanese professional wrestler, currently working as a freelancer. He returned from a two-year hiatus due to injury in 2005.

== History ==
=== All Japan Pro Wrestling (1994−2000) ===
Shiga trained in the All Japan dojo and debuted in All Japan Pro Wrestling in early 1994. For the first two years, Shiga spent most of the time in opening matches or low midcard matches as he paid his dues. On January 3, 1996, Shiga won his first honor when he won the yearly January 3 Korakuen Hall Jr. Heavyweight Battle Royal. Shortly after Shiga entered the 1996 Asunaro Cup Tournament where he finished in 6th place with 2 points. Following these events, Shiga returned to the midcard for another few years where he did not challenge for any titles. In 1998, Shiga teamed with Akira Taue in the 1998 Asunaro Cup tournament where they finished as the runners-up losing to Jun Akiyama and Takao Omori in the finals. Later in the year, Shiga joined Kenta Kobashi's stable: Burning. On February 13, 1999, Shiga teamed with Kobashi and Jun Akiyama in a One Night Six Man Tag Team Tournament where they emerged victorious. On June 9, 1999, Shiga received his first title shot when he challenged Yoshinari Ogawa for the World Junior Heavyweight Championship but lost. On January 3, 2000, Shiga won his second Jr. Heavyweight Battle Royal. In June 2000, Shiga left All Japan along with the majority of the native roster to Mitsuharu Misawa's new promotion: Pro Wrestling Noah.

=== Pro Wrestling Noah (2000−2010) ===
Shiga debuted for Noah at their first show on August 5, 2000, where he teamed with Naomichi Marufuji to defeat Masao Inoue and Yoshinobu Kanemaru. The following day, Shiga wrestled in the second to last match teaming with Daisuke Ikeda in a losing effort to Mitsuharu Misawa and Yoshinari Ogawa. After debuting in Noah, Shiga continue to remain in the midcard but would get more to participate in tournaments and title matches, by the end of 2000 he joined Jun Akiyama's stable: Sterness. In March 2001, Shiga entered the tournament to crown the first GHC Heavyweight Champion, Shiga defeated Too Cold Scorpio in the first round but lost to Yoshihiro Takayama in the quarterfinals. In October 2001, Shiga entered a tournament to crown the first GHC Tag Team Championship as he teamed with Takuma Sano but the pair lost in the first round to Takao Omori and Shinjiro Ohtani. By the end of 2001, Shiga teamed with Kanemaru to win a One Night Tag Team Tournament. In early 2002, Shiga left Sterness to reunite with Kenta Kobashi in Burning. Shortly after joining, Shiga teamed with Kobashi and Kenta to win a One Day Six Man Tag Team Tournament. On October 19, 2002, Shiga and Kobashi challenged Jun Akiyama and Akitoshi Saito for the GHC Tag Team Championship but came up short. In January 2003, Shiga would suffer a serious neck injury that would keep him out for over two and a half years.

After two and a half years, Shiga returned to the ring at Noah's September 18, 2005 Nippon Budokan show where he lost to Tamon Honda. One year after returning from injury, Shiga defeated Scorpio on September 3, 2006, to win the GHC Openweight Hardcore Championship, his first championship. In February 2007, Shiga formed a tag team with Kishin Kawabata called the Pen Pals. On February 17, The Pen Pals won a tournament to become the first GHC Hardcore Openweight Tag Team Champions. On July 15, 2007, the team challenged Jun Akiyama and Takeshi Rikio for the GHC Tag Team Championship but lost. In November when the Tag Team Championship again became a singles championship which saw Shiga lose to Kawabata. In 2009, Shiga also began making appearances for Hustle where he competed as Punch the C. After remaining in the midcard for two more years, Shiga was released from Noah in early 2010.

=== Freelancer (2010–present) ===
After being released, Shiga made appearances in New Japan Pro-Wrestling. He wrestled on their January 31, 2010 show teaming with Tamon Honda in a losing effort to GBH (Togi Makabe and Tomoaki Honma). He also participated in New Japan's J Sports Crown Openweight 6-Man Tag Tournament, where he teamed with Honda and Makoto Hashi but the team lost in the first round. Shiga also began wrestling in Kensuke Office and returned to Noah but is used in opening matches. On August 27, 2011, Shiga took part in the charity event All Together, put together by New Japan Pro-Wrestling, All Japan Pro Wrestling and Pro Wrestling Noah, and defeated 25 other men in a battle royal to win the Destroyer Cup.

Kentaro Shiga has been inactive since 2014. His final match was a losing effort against Genba Hirayanagi as "Mr. Punch". The match took place at Pro Wrestling Noah's "The First Navigation" on Day 9 of the tour.

== Championships and accomplishments ==
- All Japan Pro Wrestling

- January 3 Korakuen Hall Junior Heavyweight Battle Royal (1996, 2000)
- One Night Six Man Tag Team Tournament (1999) - with Kenta Kobashi and Jun Akiyama

- Pro Wrestling Noah

- GHC Openweight/Hardcore Tag Team Championship (1 time)^{1}
- One Night Tag Tournament (2001) - with Yoshinobu Kanemaru
- One Day Six Man Tag Team Tournament (2002) - with Kenta Kobashi and Kenta
- GHC Hardcore Tag Team Championship Tournament (2007) - with Kishin Kawabata

- Other titles

- Destroyer Cup (2011)

^{1} When the GHC Openweight Hardcore Championship was rechristened to the GHC Hardcore Tag Team Championship, Shiga won the title with Kishin Kawabata. However, Shiga's title reign was still recognized as one reign instead of two.
