= Kenta =

- Pronunciation: Ken-ta
- Gender: Male
- Language: Japanese

Origin
- Origin: Japanese
- Meaning: "healthy", "strong"
- Region of origin: Japan

Other names
- Related names: Kentarō

Kenta (Japanese: 廉侍) is a masculine Japanese given name. (written: 健太, 建太, 研太, 賢太 or ケンタ in katakana).

Notable people with the name include:

- Kenta Abe (阿部 健太; born 1984), Japanese baseball player
- Kenta Fukasaku (深作 健太; born 1972), Japanese film director
- Kenta Hayashi (林 健太; born 1994), Japanese kickboxer
- Kenta Kataoka (片岡健太; born 1985);Japanese musician and lead vocalist for rock band sumika (band)
- Kenta Kobashi (小橋 建太; born 1967), Japanese professional wrestler
- Kenta Kobayashi (小林 健太; born 1981), Japanese professional wrestler
- Kenta Hasegawa (長谷川 健太; born 1965), Japanese football manager
- Kenta Ito (伊藤 研太; born 1999), Japanese footballer
- Kenta Izuka (猪塚 健太; born 1986), Japanese actor and television personality
- Kenta Maeda (前田 健太; born 1988), Japanese baseball player
- Kenta Matsudaira (松平 健太; born 1991), Japanese table tennis player
- Kenta Miyake (三宅 健太; born 1977), Japanese voice actor
- Kenta Miyawaki (宮脇 健太; born 2001), Japanese footballer
- Kenta Nagasawa (長澤 憲大; born 1993), Japanese judoka
- Kenta Nishizawa (西澤 健太; born 1996), Japanese footballer
- Kenta Shimaoka (島岡 健太; born 1973), Japanese footballer
- Kenta Shimizu (清水 健太; born 1981), Japanese footballer
- Kenta Takanashi (高梨 健太; born 1997), Japanese volleyball player
- Kenta Tanaka (田中 健太; born 1988), Japanese field hockey player
- Kenta Yamazaki (山崎 健太; born 1987), Japanese footballer
- Kenta Yoshikawa (吉川 健太; born 1986), Japanese footballer

== Fictional characters ==
- Kenta (Black Mask) (ケンタ) in Hikari Sentai Maskman
- Kenta (ケンタ) in Ani-Yoko
- Kenta Date (a.k.a. MegaRed) (伊達 健太) in Denji Sentai Megaranger
- Kenta Kitagawa (北川 健太) in Digimon Tamers
- Kenta Yumiya (湯宮 健太) in Beyblade: Metal Fusion
- Kenta, civilian name of Lung, a villain in the web publication Worm

== See also ==
- Kentarō
- Tarō (given name)
