= GHC Openweight Hardcore Championship =

Professional wrestling championship

GHC Hardcore Championship
- Current championship design

Details
- Promotion: CyberFight
- Brand: Pro Wrestling Noah
- Date established: March 13, 2004
- Current champion: Shuji Ishikawa
- Date won: June 15, 2026

Other names
- GHC Openweight Hardcore Championship (2004–2007, 2007–2009); GHC Openweight Hardcore Tag Team Championship (2007); GHC Hardcore Championship (2023–present)
Statistics
- First champion: Jun Akiyama
- Most reigns: (2 reigns): Kentaro Shiga; Kishin Kawabata; Masato Tanaka; Shuji Ishikawa
- Longest reign: Shuji Ishikawa (422 days)
- Shortest reign: Hikaru Sato (7 days)
- Oldest champion: Masato Tanaka (52 years, 346 days)
- Youngest champion: Naomichi Marufuji (25 years, 20 days)
- Heaviest champion: Shuji Ishikawa (130 kg)
- Lightest champion: Naomichi Marufuji (90 Kg)

The Global Honored Crown (GHC) Hardcore Championship (Japanese: GHCハードコア王座, Hepburn: GHC Hādokoa Ōza) is a professional wrestling championship created and promoted by the Japanese professional wrestling promotion Pro Wrestling Noah, originally created in 2004 as a singles title known as the Global Hardcore Crown (GHC) Openweight Hardcore Championship (グローバル・ハードコア・クラウン無差別級王座, Gurōbaru Hādokoa Kuraun Musabetsu-kyū Ōza). Colloquially known as the "White GHC" belt due to its white leather strap, the championship was primarily associated with Jun Akiyama during its original run. Most matches contested for the championship were held with a 15-minute time limit and often featured special stipulations chosen by the champion. The championship was first retired in 2009.

The original title had a total of nine reigns shared between eight different champions. The title was brought back in 2023 and given a new name, the GHC Hardcore Championship. The GHC Hardcore Championship has had a total of two reigns shared between two champions.

== History ==
The Global Hardcore Crown Openweight Hardcore Championship was created in March 2004 when Jun Akiyama declared himself champion as a way to liven up the Pro Wrestling Noah regional tours. In 2007, it was announced that it would be reformed into a tag team title, continuing with the same lineage as the original belt. Later in 2007, it reverted to being a singles championship. Kentaro Shiga, who was the fifth champion before the reforming into a tag team title, was still recognized as such (along with his tag team partner, Kishin Kawabata), even though it was vacated to be put up for grab in a tournament, which they eventually won. On November 19, 2007, Kawabata defeated Shiga to reunify the title. The title was deactivated after ninth champion Kenta Kobashi suffered an injury in December 2009, forcing him to vacate the title.

In October 2023, it was revealed by Nosawa Rongai that Pro Wrestling Noah would bring the belt as the newly created GHC Hardcore Championship with a separate lineage. Masato Tanaka won the revived title on October 23, 2023, at Monday Magic ep. 2, by defeating Ninja Mack.

== Reigns ==
Across the two lineages, there have been a total of thirteen reigns shared between ten different champions. The current title holder is Shuji Ishikawa who is in his second reign.

=== Original version ===
Key
No.	Overall reign number
Reign	Reign number for the specific champion
Days	Number of days held
Defenses	Number of successful defenses

No.	Champion	Championship change			Reign statistics			Notes	Ref.
No.	Champion	Date	Event	Location	Reign	Days	Defenses	Notes	Ref.
1	Jun Akiyama	March 13, 2004	Navigation	Tokyo, Japan	1	217	5	Akiyama declared himself the inaugural champion.	
2	Naomichi Marufuji	October 16, 2004	Navigation Against the Current 2004	Tokushima, Japan	1	140	2	Marufuji won the match via countout.	
3	Muhammad Yone	March 5, 2005	Navigate for Evolution 2005	Tokyo, Japan	1	231	3		
4	Scorpio	October 22, 2005	Autumn Navigation '05	Tokushima, Japan	1	316	1		
5	Kentaro Shiga	September 3, 2006	Shiny Navigation '06	Nagoya, Japan	1	167	3		
6	Kishin Kawabata and Kentaro Shiga	February 17, 2007	Navigation for Evolution 2007 – Day 2	Tokyo, Japan	1	275	2	Defeated Go Shiozaki and Shuhei Taniguchi in a tournament final. This is still Kentaro Shiga's original championship reign. During their reign, the title was billed as GHC Openweight Hardcore Tag Team Championship.	
7	Kishin Kawabata	November 19, 2007	Winter Navigation '07 – Day 4	Niigata, Japan	2	322	4		
8	Makoto Hashi	October 6, 2008	Autumn Navigation '08 – Day 2	Isesaki, Japan	1	245	2		
9	Kenta Kobashi	June 8, 2009	Southern Navigation 2009 – Day 3	Hachiōji, Japan	1	198	4		
—	Deactivated	December 23, 2009	—	—	—	—	—	Kenta Kobashi vacated the title after suffering an injury. After that the title became inactive.	

=== Revived version ===
Key
No.	Overall reign number
Reign	Reign number for the specific champion
Days	Number of days held
Defenses	Number of successful defenses
+	Current reign is changing daily

No.	Champion	Championship change			Reign statistics			Notes	Ref.
No.	Champion	Date	Event	Location	Reign	Days	Defenses	Notes	Ref.
1	Masato Tanaka	October 23, 2023	Monday Magic ep. 2	Tokyo, Japan	1	35	0	Defeated Ninja Mack to win the reactivated title.	
2	Ninja Mack	November 27, 2023	Monday Magic ep. 4	Tokyo, Japan	1	159	2	This was a three-way hardcore match also involving Super Crazy.	
3	Shuji Ishikawa	May 4, 2024	Wrestle Magic	Tokyo, Japan	1	422	2	This was a hardcore match.	
4	Hayata	June 30, 2025	Wrestle Magic 2025	Tokyo, Japan	1	203	2		
5	Titus Alexander	January 19, 2026	Monday Magic Rising Sun Season ep. 1	Tokyo, Japan	1	21	0		
6	Masato Tanaka	February 9, 2026	Monday Magic Rising Sun Season ep. Final	Tokyo, Japan	2	105	0		
7	Hikaru Sato	May 25, 2026	Monday Magic Inside Out Season #2	Tokyo, Japan	1	7	0		
—	Vacated	June 1, 2026	—	—	—	—	—	Title was vacated due to Sato suffering an injury.	
8	Shuji Ishikawa	June 15, 2026	Wrestle Magic 2026	Tokyo, Japan	2	62+	0	Defeated Daisuke Sekimoto to win the vacant title.	

== Combined reigns ==
As of August 16, 2026.

†	Indicates the current champion

Rank	Wrestler	No. of reigns	Combined defences	Combined days
1	Kishin Kawabata	2	6	597
2	Shuji Ishikawa †	2	2	484+
3	Kentaro Shiga	2	5	441
4	Scorpio	1	1	316
5	Makoto Hashi	1	2	245
6	Muhammad Yone	1	3	231
7	Jun Akiyama	1	5	217
8	Hayata	1	2	203
9	Kenta Kobashi	1	4	198
10	Ninja Mack	1	2	159
11	Masato Tanaka	2	0	140
11	Naomichi Marufuji	1	2	140
13	Titus Alexander	1	0	21
14	Hikaru Sato	1	0	7
