= Diamond Ring (professional wrestling) =

Former Japanese professional wrestling organization

- Acronym: DR
- Founded: 2005
- Defunct: 2014
- Headquarters: Yoshikawa, Saitama, Japan
- Founder(s): Kensuke Sasaki and Akira Hokuto
- Owner(s): Kensuke Sasaki and Akira Hokuto
- Formerly: Kensuke Office

Diamond Ring was an independent Japanese professional wrestling promotion that, until 2012, was known as Kensuke Office. The promotion was founded and owned by puroresu legend Kensuke Sasaki, who owned and operated it since its creation in 2005. In February 2014 the promotion ran its last card, after which Sasaki announced his retirement.

== History ==
=== As Kensuke Office ===
After Kensuke Sasaki became a freelancer he established his own promotion named Kensuke Office, and the promotion was run by Sasaki's wife (former joshi wrestler), Akira Hokuto, and represented Sasaki, Katsuhiko Nakajima, Kento Miyahara, Takashi Yoshioka and Takashi Okita, under the name Kensuke Office, Sasaki and pupil Katsuhiko Nakajima toured other promotions, particularly All Japan Pro Wrestling and Pro Wrestling Noah, and they also opened a training school. In September 2006, Kensuke Office was announced as a member of the Global Professional Wrestling Alliance and they held their first show on February 11 and it was televised by Gaora TV. Beginning in 2007, Kensuke Office has organised its own shows, and some of the talent featured on the shows include Minoru Suzuki, Jun Akiyama, Genichiro Tenryu, Yoshihiro Takayama, Kikutaro, Takeshi Morishima, Kenta and Catfish Man. Kensuke office served as developmental territory of Pro Wrestling Noah, featuring several of its superstars. On August 1 to August 4, 2011 they held their first tournament named Summer Volcano Tag Tournament and featured outside participants from Kaientai Dojo (Kaji Tomato), some other freelancers (Kikutaro, Kenichiro Arai, Namazu Man), from Pro Wrestling Noah (Genba Hirayanagi and Kentaro Shiga), and from DDT (Antonio Honda) with the winners eventually being Antonio Honda and Kento Miyahara. In January 2012, Kensuke Office was changed their name Diamond Ring.

=== As Diamond Ring ===
They featured storylines with the Diamond Ring stable with the Voodoo Murders. On 5 October 2013 Nakajima received an opportunity for the GHC Heavyweight Championship and he lost to the defending champion Kenta. On September 9 Kento Miyahara announced that he was officially breaking off his affiliation with Diamond Ring and becoming a freelancer. On 24 November 2013 the Voodoo Murders did their last match on Diamond Ring and left the promotion and jumped to Pro Wrestling Zero1. On February 11, 2014, Sasaki suffered his first loss to Katsuhiko Nakajima in the main event of a Diamond Ring event, later that day Satoshi Kajiwara made his last match on the promotion and retired. Two days later, Sasaki held a press conference to announce his retirement from professional wrestling. Following Sasaki's retirement, Diamond Ring was left with only one remaining wrestler, Katsuhiko Nakajima, with Satoshi Kajiwara resigning and Mitsuhiro Kitamiya joining Pro Wrestling Noah. On March 9 they held their last show named Diamond Ring Hometown Match. After that card the promotion was closed but the stable was kept as represented by Nakajima until 2015. Afterwards, when Nakajima joined to Pro Wrestling Noah he no longer identified or affiliated himself with said group.

== Staff ==
- Akira Hokuto (Fighting producer/Representative Director)
- * Rie Nakamura (assistant manager)

== Management ==
- Kensuke Sasaki (Officer)
- * Hisako Sasaki (Representative Director)

== Tournaments ==
Tournament	Latest winner(s)	Date won
Summer Volcano Tag Tournament	Kento Miyahara and Antonio Honda	August 4, 2011

== Notable alumni ==
- Katsuhiko Nakajima (Freelance / GLEAT)
- Mitsuhiro Kitamiya (Pro Wrestling Noah)
- Kento Miyahara (All Japan Pro Wrestling)
- Jun Nishikawa (Freelance / Michinoku Pro Wrestling)
- Kensuke Sasaki (retired)
- Takashi Okita (retired)
- Ryuji Yamaguchi (retired)

== See also ==
- Professional wrestling in Japan
- List of professional wrestling promotions in Japan
