= Kenta Kobashi =

Japanese professional wrestler (born 1967)

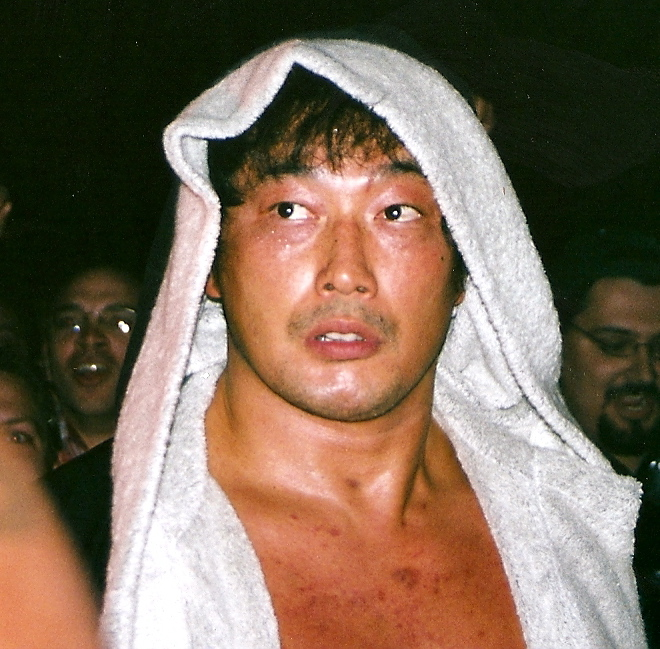
- Kobashi in 2007

Personal information
- Born: March 27, 1967 (age 59) Fukuchiyama, Kyoto, Japan
- Spouse: Mizuki Mai (m. 2010)
- Children: 1

Professional wrestling career
- Ring name(s): Kenta Kobashi; Blaze
- Billed height: 1.86 m (6 ft 1 in)
- Billed weight: 115 kg (254 lb)
- Billed from: Kyoto, Japan
- Trained by: Dory Funk Jr. Giant Baba; Haru Sonoda; Masanobu Fuchi
- Debut: February 26, 1988
- Retired: May 11, 2013

Kenta Kobashi (小橋 健太, Kobashi Kenta; ring name: 小橋 建太) (born, March 27, 1967) is a Japanese professional wrestling promoter and retired wrestler. Broadly referred to by the nickname "Tetsujin" (鉄人; Iron Man), he is widely regarded as one of the greatest professional wrestlers of all time. He is best known for his two runs in All Japan Pro Wrestling (AJPW) and Pro Wrestling Noah, of which he captured AJPW's Triple Crown Heavyweight Championship thrice, and Noah's GHC Heavyweight Championship once. He is the winner of numerous Match of the Year and Wrestler of the Year awards, including from the Wrestling Observer Newsletter (WON) and Tokyo Sports.

Kobashi started his wrestling career in AJPW in 1987, debuting the next year and becoming the star rookie of the promotion. Booked as a resilient jobber by AJPW founder Giant Baba, he became a key major figure in the shift between old wrestlers to younger ones in the turn of the Super World of Sports exodus. In 1993, he was officially dubbed as one of the members of the Four Heavenly Kings (プロレスの四天王, Puroresu no shiten'nō; also called the Four Pillars of Heaven) (Note: Named after the Four Heavenly Kings, this nomenclature was given to the four by Tokyo Sports journalist Shoichi Shibata, and christened by Baba and the magazine.) of AJPW, alongside Mitsuharu Misawa, Toshiaki Kawada, and Akira Taue. He became renowned for his matches and rivalries with gaijin (foreign) wrestlers and fellow Japanese wrestlers alike. He became a widely successful tag wrestler, teaming with Misawa, the AJPW ace, as part of the Super Generation Army (超世代軍, Chou Sedai-gun), and becoming a noted combatant in some of the most highly acclaimed tag team wrestling matches of the 1990s.

He became successful as a singles wrestling star later on, usually by his determination and performance in highly acclaimed matches, usually for the Triple Crown Heavyweight Championship or in the Champion Carnival tournament. His matches with his fellow Kings, as well as the likes of Steve Williams, Stan Hansen, Burning stable-mate and tag partner Jun Akiyama, and Terry "Bam Bam" Gordy, are held in high regard and praise, especially those against the Kings and Hansen. As a top singles wrestler in AJPW, he qualified for the 1997 and 1999 Champion Carnival finals, and won the 2000 tournament.

Kobashi was part of the dissenting crew who would take part in the second exodus of All Japan Pro Wrestling in 2000, which led to the creation of the Pro Wrestling Noah promotion, and would later continue to work as a wrestler for the promotion for thirteen years. He notably concluded the inter-promotional rivalry with Misawa in Noah, winning the GHC Heavyweight Championship from him on March 1, 2003. He went on to have the longest singular reign for the championship of all time, holding it for 735 days, losing it to Takeshi Rikio on March 5, 2005. In that reign, he had defended the title thirteen times (the second most ever behind Takashi Sugiura, who had one more than Kobashi), and had sold out each of the Noah-affiliated shows that had him defend his title.

Kobashi spent many of the later years of his career sidelined due to various injuries. He underwent numerous surgeries on his arms and legs in the early-mid 2000s before retiring from in-ring action in May 2013. Kobashi continues to make sporadic appearances in Noah, as well as DDT Pro-Wrestling, whilst also promoting his own shows under the Fortune Dream banner.

== Early life ==
Kenta Kobashi (小橋 健太, Kobashi Kenta) was born in Fukuchiyama in Kyoto Prefecture on March 27, 1967. He was raised predominantly in a single-parent household with him, his three-years-older brother Eiji, and his mother Miyako, after his parents had separated and later divorced. He competed in baseball in his youth, and was part of the Atsumi Fighters team. It was when he was 10 years old that he saw his first professional wrestling match with his brother Eiji, which was at an All Japan Pro Wrestling show. The match featured the then-rising star Jumbo Tsuruta versus Mexican luchador enmascarado Mil Mascaras at the Denen Coliseum in August 1977, shown on the pro wrestling block on NTV. To practice for pro wrestling, Eiji and Kenta constructed a custom-made can replica of the NWA World's Heavyweight Championship belt to use for their exhibition "title" matches.

Kobashi joined a Judo club in junior high school, and he, in his senior year, placed third in the qualifying round at nationals, having been outweighed by his opponent in the semifinals by 50 kg (110 lbs). He also had practice in rugby union, but did not have any placements in competitions with the sport. He attended a New Japan Pro Wrestling (NJPW) show at this time, of which he was, according to Kobashi himself, hit with Stan Hansen's bull rope. After graduation, in 1986, he took a job as a Kyocera General Affairs worker, working in plants in Kyoto City and Kagoshima. After being inspired by a magazine article featuring a young Mike Tyson, he quit his job the next year, and he sent his resume to the AJPW offices, which was rejected. After being in contact with International Wrestling Enterprise referee Mitsuo Endo, he was set up to do an interview at the Shiga Prefectural Gymnasium in Otsu on May 26, which happened to be with Shohei "Giant" Baba, the founder and then-head booker and chief executive officer of AJPW. After Baba declined to have an interview and instead prompted Kobashi to wait and relocate to Tokyo, Kobashi was accepted to their dojo on June 20, 1987. He was trained there by Baba, as well as Funk brother Dory Funk Jr., "Magic Dragon" Haru Sonoda and Baba-protégé Masanobu Fuchi. Sonoda died on South African Airways Flight 295 on November 28, and after having an argument with Baba, was sworn under pressure to be trained exclusively for a time by Fuchi.

== Professional wrestling career ==
=== All Japan Pro Wrestling (1987–2000, 2009) ===
==== Rookie years (1987–1990) ====
Kobashi and fellow trainee Tsuyoshi Kikuchi made their first official appearances as All Japan Pro Wrestling trainees on December 16, 1987, appearing in a battle royal, which they both lost. Kobashi officially debuted as a professional wrestler in Rittō, Shiga on February 26, 1988, against veteran wrestler Motoshi Okuma, donning blue-based, white-stripped trunks and Masanobu Fuchi's old boots. Baba had been impressed with the match, and took Kobashi out to dinner with the rest of the invited wrestlers. He was booked by Baba to lose his first 63 matches, which were all singles bouts. It was all part of a plan set by Baba, that even in defeat, Kobashi shined and his gutsy, never-say-die efforts would garner him more momentum. He was earned numerous Rookie of the Year awards from the Japanese media, especially Tokyo Sports. During this time, Kobashi had officially commissioned, and was granted, his first real wrestling attire, which was adorned with red.

Kobashi had his first championship match in February 1989, teaming with Giant Baba to lose to the incumbent All Asia Tag Team Champions Footloose, the team of Toshiaki Kawada and Samson Fuyuki. Kobashi won his first singles match on May 16, 1989, against Jim Crockett Promotions jobber Mitch Snow, and on June 6, he picked up a win over established Stampede Wrestling rising star Johnny Smith. During 1989, when The Road Warriors were in AJPW, they taught Kobashi the "Road Warrior Workout". Eleven months later he won his first title, the aforementioned All Asia Tag Team Championship with Tiger Mask II (Misawa); however, shortly after removing the mask, Kobashi and Misawa would vacate the title. Later in the year, he won them again, this time with Johnny Ace.

==== Start of the Super Generation Army (1990–1993) ====
After Genichiro Tenryu defected himself and several wrestlers from AJPW to form Super World of Sports (SWS), a gap was left in the higher-card roster of AJPW, which had recently integrated Tenryu-protégé Toshiaki Kawada and the former Tiger Mask II, Mitsuharu Misawa. Baba had slowed down his in-ring work to focus more on booking, and focus on the rookies and other young talent that he had that would fill gaps in the aging stars' departures, retirements or decrease in quality. In order to compete with their competitors, especially NJPW and the Akira Maeda-fronted Universal Wrestling Federation (and its later reincarnations), Baba chose to focus on the talents that had been most popular with the fans of AJPW; this included Kobashi, Kawada and Misawa, as well as former Sumo wrestler Tamakirin Yasumasa, who had now gone under his real name Akira Taue, and Tsuyoshi Kikuchi. Baba gave all of them an official group to assign themselves with, and they'd form the Super Generation Army (超世代軍, Chou Sedai-gun) in August 1990 (the name of which was coined by AJPW commentator Kenji Wakabayashi).

Kobashi would be confirmed as one of the five wrestlers assigned to the newly formed Super Generation Army, and would have his official first match as part of the new stable on August 10, 1990, defeating Joel Deaton and Johnny Ace in a tag match alongside Kawada. The stable would then start an official feud with the Jumbo Tsuruta-led Tsuruta-gun (鶴田軍). Once a loved babyface now turned to a tweener role, Tsuruta now wanted to declare himself superior over the Super Generation Army in spite of his age. A lot of the matches featuring both stables had mixed the rivalry between Misawa and Tsuruta, and the prowess of Kobashi, who had been thrown in as an underdog to the more experienced wrestlers, mostly including Tsuruta himself, as well as Masanobu Fuchi, Yoshiaki Yatsu (Jumbo's tag partner for several years) and The Great Kabuki. At the same time, when teamed with the smaller Tsuyoshi Kikuchi in the All Asia Tag Team Championship division, he would play a "big brother" role, coming in to try to save the match after Kikuchi had been worked on for a while by the opponents. The title win with Kikuchi over Dan Kroffat and Doug Furnas, the Can-Am Express, took place before a rabid crowd in Kikuchi's hometown of Sendai on May 25, 1992; the match quickly gained legendary status among tape-traders, and was voted 1992's Match of the Year by the Wrestling Observer Newsletter.

During this time, he had started a feud with Stan Hansen. Hansen and Kobashi had begun to have their first matches together in the late 1980s, with Kobashi being beaten every time by Hansen and his tag team partners, predominantly Genichiro Tenryu. With Tenryu gone, their matches usually then turned to singles matches, with Kobashi losing every time to Hansen via the Western Lariat. For the next few years, especially during the period between 1991 and 1993, Kobashi would increasingly have longer matches with Hansen, which would culminate in close falls and traded offence.

==== Tag team with Misawa, Four Heavenly Kings (1993–1995) ====
By 1993, the Super Generation Army had become less and less relied to the feud with Tsuruta, after the latter had to temporarily step away from the ring, and later, the entirety of the higher-card division of AJPW. Misawa, the leader of the Super Generation Army, had become the most popular wrestler in AJPW, and one of the leading candidates for the most popular wrestler in all of Japan. During this time, Misawa had won and defended the Triple Crown Heavyweight Championship more times than anyone prior to him in one reign. Kawada and Taue would become more distant from the Super Generation Army after they had formed a temporarily partnership from their rivalry, which spanned from their inner-conflicts in the stable to Taue's defection to Tsuruta-gun; this would culminate in the creation of the Holy Demon Army (聖鬼軍, Sei Ki Gun). Likewise, Kobashi became Misawa's main tag partner in the middle of the year when Kawada became Misawa's main rival.

Kobashi gained his first singles victory over a former Triple Crown Heavyweight Champion, when he defeated Terry Gordy in May of that year in Sapporo. The match, and the subsequent ones also featuring the three other company "Heavenly Kings" of Misawa, Kawada and Taue, against their foreign foes (Hansen, Steve Williams and Dan Spivey respectively), marked a shift in the guard for AJPW and their main event scene. Heralded by Baba and coined by journalist Shoichi Shibata, who'd borrow it from the Buddhist concept of the same name, each of the kings would become the four big national faces of AJPW, and would be heavily featured on magazines and other media as such. On July 29, he faced Stan Hansen in a singles match, which Hansen won. The match was considered a superior match to the main event: a Triple Crown Heavyweight Championship match between Misawa and Kawada. It also was Kobashi's first singles match to be awarded five stars by the Wrestling Observer Newsletter's Dave Meltzer. On August 23, Kobashi was targeted with the first ever of Steve Williams' Homicide Backdrop suplexes, which was responded with the crowd of gasps of horror, with Misawa commenting that he thought for a second that Kobashi had died. In a match a week later between Kobashi and Williams, which has since been acclaimed, Williams defeated Kobashi using three Homicide Backdrops, the last of which using a bridging pin after the other two had been kicked out of previously. Williams shook Kobashi's hand after the match, and awarded him with applause. On December 3, 1993, Kobashi gained his first pinfall over Kawada, won his first World's Strongest Tag Determination League, and won his first World Tag Team Championship with Misawa.

Hansen and Kobashi met again numerous times in 1994, most notably on April 10, during the year's Champion Carnival tournament. In a twenty-six minute bout, Kobashi finally defeated Hansen with his trademark moonsault, but did not make it to the finals due to the win. Ultimately, Hansen finished a point in front of Kobashi, after Kobashi had won to Akiyama and lost to eventual runner-up Steve Williams, and Hansen had lost to Akira Taue. The two losses meant that Hansen would not succeed to the finals of the tournament, which ultimately came down to Kobashi's win over Hansen. However, Kobashi would earn another singles match against Williams, this time for the latter's Triple Crown Heavyweight title. The lead story in the match was whether Kobashi, in his first shot at the title, would become the second-ever member of the Four Heavenly Kings to hold the Triple Crown title, after Misawa. On September 3, 1994, they faced off against each other for the title at the Nippon Budokan in a five-star match, which Williams won. Kobashi and Misawa won that years Tag League, defeating Williams and former tag partner Johnny Ace in the finals.

His next Triple Crown Heavyweight title challenge was against Kawada on January 19, 1995. This led to a 60-minute time limit draw, and is regarded as the greatest hour-long bout in wrestling history by the Wrestling Observer Newsletter. In the match, which took place in Osaka, Kobashi had the crowd on his side against the incumbent champion Kawada. On June 9, Kobashi and Misawa lost the tag titles to the Holy Demon Army's Kawada and Taue. The match is also notable due to it winning the Match of the Year award from Tokyo Sports. Kobashi and Hansen had yet another notable match, albeit one that was non-televised in Ōdate, one that would be dubbed as "violent" and would be remarked as one of the most graphic matches in puroresu history up to that point. In the match, which saw Kobashi team with Masao Inoue to take on Hansen and Richard Slinger, Kobashi took Hansen's bull rope and used it on him, which prompted Hansen to throw a chair aimed at Kobashi's head, but instead hit him in his upper arm, which caused it to be torn open to the bone. Although he finished the match, Kobashi stormed Hansen's locker room afterward, and angrily wanted to have a real fight with Hansen to make up to his injury. The eventual fight was stopped by several members of the locker room, including Misawa, who had to be late to his entrance due to him breaking up the fight between Hansen and Kobashi. Kobashi was taken to an ambulance after it was called by Motoko Baba and later was taken to a hospital near the venue, where he had to be cared for with 22 stitches near his bicep. In the middle of 1995, Kobashi suffered the first of many knee injuries, but worked through it in the later tours that year.

On October 25, Kobashi and Misawa held a Triple Crown Heavyweight Championship match against each-other, for which Misawa was the champion and Kobashi was the expected underdog. Misawa and Kobashi, who had been known in the press as "inseparable", faced off against each other to great fanfare at the Nippon Budokan. After over forty minutes, Misawa pinned Kobashi with a Tiger Driver to win and retain the title.

==== First Triple Crown title reign, end of Misawa tag team (1995–1996) ====
After Kobashi and Misawa's match against each-other in October, they prepared themselves to compete in that years World's Strongest Tag Determination League. For the third straight year, they reached the finals, and opposite to them, for the second time, would be the Holy Demon Army team of Toshiaki Kawada and Akira Taue. After Kobashi hit Taue with his moonsault finishing maneuver and pinned him, Kobashi and Misawa would have won their third straight Tag League. The match would be considered the true end of the tagging partnership between Misawa and Kobashi, wherein they had dominated the tag team division. They went their separate ways to become accomplices and friendly rivals in 1996, and Jun Akiyama was slated to become Misawa's new main tag team partner. The separation left Kobashi without a real tag partner for most of the year, mostly having partnerships between The Patriot and Johnny Ace, where the trio was given the name G.E.T ("Global, Energetic & Tough"). He had also been selected as the elder tag partner to rookie Hawaiian wrestler Maunakea Mossman.

On July 24, 1996, Kobashi earned yet another chance at the Triple Crown, this time against the unexpected incumbent Akira Taue. Taue had previously won the title against Misawa, defeating him to halt the latter's 364 days reign, which had been won and lost in the same city: Sapporo. Kobashi defeated Taue in their Tokyo bout, won his first Triple Crown Heavyweight title, and had, for the first time ever, defeated a fellow member of the Four Heavenly Kings in a singles match. His first defense as champion came against his gaijin rival, Stan Hansen. In a considerable nod to Hansen, Kobashi started to use Hansen's own move, the Western Lariat, to win more matches. Mainly, instead of it being of a similar nature where Hansen would run toward the opponent before hitting them with the Lariat, Kobashi would hold the opponent and wind up his arms before hitting the move. It would officially be dubbed the Burning Lariat, in recognition to Kobashi. The main reason for this change was due to Kobashi's ailing knees, which had been succumbed to injury both during the execution of his main finisher, the moonsault, and for other reasons. Hansen and Kobashi fought on September 5, with Kobashi coming out on top with the Lariat.

==== The start of Burning, second Triple Crown title reign, debut of the Burning Hammer (1997–1998) ====
By 1997, Kobashi was the most popular wrestler in the entirety of AJPW. He had been considerably popular with the fans for his underdog tactics and his dexterity; but, after he had captured the title, he reached new popular heights. After defending the title against Kawada earlier in the previous year in another draw, he had been scheduled to face Mitsuharu Misawa at the first main pay-per-view show of the 1997 AJPW calendar year. On the January 20 Osaka pay-per-view, Misawa defeated Kobashi to end his title reign, and secure his third overall reign with the belt. In March, in that year's Champion Carnival tournament, he gained his first pinfall victory over Misawa. At the end of the tournament, Kobashi qualified for the finals for the first time. However, instead of the traditional one on one contest to settle the carnival, a one night 3 way round robin was held due to Kobashi, Kawada, and Misawa all having finished the Carnival round robin with the same score. In the first match Kobashi went to a 30-minute draw with Misawa. However, this match left both men greatly weakened and Kawada was able to quickly gain his first singles pin over Misawa in the next match, which gave Kobashi little time to rest. In the final match, Kawada defeated Kobashi to gain his second Carnival title. In October that year, Kobashi won his first World Tag title without Misawa, when he and Johnny Ace defeated Triangle of Power members Gary Albright and Steve Williams. In the same month, he challenged Misawa for the Triple Crown in a sequel match to their January encounter, but Misawa had yet again defeated him.

By the end of 1997, Kobashi had begun to procure a closer partnership with Jun Akiyama; a fellow Super Generation Army member, and an occasional tag partner of Kobashi in the faction. Both were foe and partner on several occasions, and maintained respect for one another, in consideration to Kobashi being Akiyama's senior. At the end of 1997, Kobashi and Akiyama would officially join forces as an official tag team; this would anger his original main tag partner during this period, Johnny Ace, and would lead to Ace turning on Kobashi in the process in August the next year. The aforementioned tag team of Kobashi and Akiyama, which had been given the name Burning, would be transformed into a unit that same year when Akiyama and Kobashi recruited apprentices and AJPW Dojo trainees Yoshinobu Kanemaru and Kentaro Shiga. Ace himself would also form a stable, this time with Johnny Smith, Bart Gunn and Wolf Hawkfield, as The Movement. Both stables would feud in the year, with Burning coming out on top on most occasions.

While Kawada would finally end his pursuit to defeat Misawa for the Triple Crown at AJPW's 25th Anniversary show in the Tokyo Dome, Kobashi would replace Kawada as Misawa's top rival, albeit one that was more respectful to one-another, instead of the bitter interpersonal distaste from Kawada and Misawa. During the year, Kobashi officially adopted a new theme song: the Osamu Suzuki produced Grand Sword, which would be adopted between 1998 and 2003, and 2005 until the end of his career. On June 12, 1998, Kobashi defeated Kawada to begin his second Triple Crown title reign. In the time of which Kobashi and Misawa would feud against each other, Kobashi would adopt a move to rival the fierceness of Misawa's Tiger Driver 91, which hadn't been kicked out of by anyone except Kobashi at that point. The debut of the move would come on October 24, 1998, in a match pitting Kobashi and the FMW-affiliated Jinsei Shinzaki, taking on Misawa and Takao Omori. Drawing inspiration from another popular move of that time, the Etsuko Mita-innovated Death Valley bomb, Kobashi would, to the shock of the crowd, use an Argentine rack dropped into a front face-lock driver (akin to a DDT) to win the match. The move had been given a fan-coined name afterward: the Burning Hammer. The move bore resemblance to Kyoko Inoue's Victoria Driver, but was different in the way each move had done the drop. The week after the debut of the Burning Hammer, Kobashi lost the Triple Crown title again to Misawa, after having defended the title previously against Taue and Akiyama. In December, Akiyama and Kobashi would win their first World's Strongest Tag Determination League as a duo by defeating Stan Hansen and Big Van Vader; Kobashi's fourth and Akiyama's first.

==== Final years (1999–2000) ====
In January 1999, Kobashi was starting new rivalries against former NJPW and WWF star Vader, Misawa's new tag team with Yoshinari Ogawa, and the Holy Demon Army and No Fear units. Vader had become the next popular gaijin in AJPW after leaving WWF, whilst the newly formed team of Misawa and Ogawa, known as The Untouchables, had risen through the ranks of the World Tag Team Championship division at the same time as the veteran Holy Demon Army team and the newly-risen No Fear unit. At the time, No Fear had consisted of former UWF talent Yoshihiro Takayama, and AJPW dojo trainee Takao Omori. Misawa and Kobashi booked themselves to have yet another Triple Crown title match, this time on June 11, 1999. Misawa came out on top against Kobashi, hitting the latter with his newly established finishing maneuver, the Emerald Flowsion (エメラルド・フロージョン, Emerarudo Furoujon; also called the Emerald Frosion). Kobashi won the Tag League again with Akiyama in December 1999. In February 2000, he defeated Vader to earn his third Triple Crown, later defending it against Takayama. Then, in April 2000, he won his first and only Champion Carnival. Whilst in the course of the tournament, he gained his first televised singles victory over Misawa.

At the same time of the in-ring success of Kobashi in 2000, tensions had boiled in AJPW. Giant Baba had died in January 2000 after battling cancer secretly, and internal struggles had emerged between Motoko Baba, his widow, and Mitsuharu Misawa, the newly inaugurated President of the company. Kobashi, in Misawa's cabinet, had become a board director in the organization. On June 16 of that year, a press conference was held in Tokyo, with Misawa announcing that he would be leaving AJPW effective immediately alongside numerous other talents that had stayed by his side as president, which represented a large chunk of officials, announcers and especially wrestlers. Among those that joined him was Kobashi. Immediately, the Triple Crown belts was vacated whilst Kobashi departed. In the process, Misawa had begun to receive funds and support to start up his own professional wrestling organization, Pro Wrestling Noah, of which Misawa would take the helm as president.

=== Pro Wrestling Noah (2000–2013) ===
==== Start in Noah, injury healing (2000–2002) ====
Pressure had mounted to Kobashi to perform at his best despite the injuries. During this period, Kobashi's knee injuries were beginning to worsen to the point that he desperately needed time off to heal. However, he was needed to establish Noah as a viable promotion, and was given a marquee position on the first two shows. On August 5, 2000, he teamed with Akiyama to defeat Misawa and Taue in a two out of three falls match in the main event of the promotion's first show. Notably, at the show, he had officially donned a new color tone; he had established himself with more darker colors, notably using black trunks, boots and knee-pads, with his trunks having a grey ornamentation. He then lost to Akiyama on the second show the next day, with Kobashi passing out while being captured in Akiyama's King Crab Lock submission. Noah struggled to organize itself without any titles during this period. At the biggest Noah show of the year on December 23, 2000, Kobashi defeated Akiyama, avenging his loss from earlier that year. Unfortunately for Kobashi, the next month would see his knees finally deteriorate to the point that he could no longer work through the pain, and was forced to take time off for premeditated healing.

In January 2001, he went through a four-and-a-half hour operation, wherein he would have his knees worked upon. In the time period of which he was out of action, he had to undergo a total of six surgeries on both of his knees, and on both of his elbows. During his recovery, in April 2001, he witnessed the crowning of the first GHC Heavyweight Champion, Mitsuharu Misawa, in a hospital bed. His return match was on February 24, 2002, and featured Kobashi reforming his pairing with Misawa to face the now-GHC Heavyweight Champion Akiyama and New Japan Pro-Wrestling's Yuji Nagata. His left ACL gave out on him during the match. After taking another four months to recuperate, he returned, and Noah began to slowly build towards him winning the Heavyweight title. By this time, the GHC Heavyweight Championship had changed hands several times, many of which resulting in shorter-than-expected reigns. Misawa, Akiyama, Yoshinari Ogawa and Yoshihiro Takayama had all staked claim to the title whilst Kobashi was inactive, with Misawa holding the belt for a second time.

==== Absolute Champion: Two-year GHC Heavyweight title reign (2003–2005) ====
Kobashi had numerous tag team matches with Misawa during the later period of 2002 and the earliest period of 2003, including a highly publicized tag team match on January 10, 2003. In the co-main event of the show, Kobashi and Akira Taue would face off against Mitsuharu Misawa, the incumbent GHC Heavyweight Champion, and New Japan Pro Wrestling's heel ace Masahiro Chono, who at this time had been ousted as the leader of both the popular nWo Japan and Team 2000 stables, and had now assumed a veteran role in the promotion. After over 20 minutes, Kobashi had caught Misawa in a suplex, which transitioned quickly into a Brainbuster, where Kobashi pinned him afterward. Kobashi's surprise pinfall victory over Misawa in the match prompted media to support the possibility of a Kobashi vs. Misawa GHC Heavyweight title match at the next big Nippon Budokan show, which was set to take place on March 1, 2003. The match was later confirmed, and took place on that day. Kobashi and Misawa fought for over half-an-hour, in what is now considered one of the greatest professional wrestling matches that have ever taken place. After many spots in the match, including a Tiger Suplex from Misawa to Kobashi from the ramp to the floor, a Brainbuster from Kobashi which accidentally caused an orbital fracture, and a kick-out from moves such as Misawa's Tiger Driver and Emerald Flowsion, and Kobashi's Orange Crush and Burning Lariat, Kobashi pinned Misawa after hitting a Burning Hammer. In the process, Kobashi had won his fourth overall world championship, his first GHC Heavyweight Championship, and would be the last world championship he'd ever hold.

Kobashi's first successful challenge for the title would be against ally Tamon Honda. The first stated pick for the challenge would've been Dark Agents leader and Sternness member Akitoshi Saito, but he had lost a tournament final to crown the next contender against Honda. On April 13, Kobashi defeated Honda at the Ariake Coliseum. The match is notable for the introduction of his new entrance theme song, Blazin'. His next challenge would be against Masahiro Chono, who had come to the Honda match to watch and to challenge the champion. After shaking hands with Kobashi, the match was confirmed but not scheduled. The scheduling for the match would be at the Tokyo Dome-held NJPW Ultimate Crush event, the first time ever (and one of two overall) that Kobashi stepped into a NJPW ring, and the first time since the 1990 Wrestling Summit that he had stepped into any ring affiliated with NJPW. Both wrestled in the co-main event, and with no time limit added to the match, a title first. Kobashi defeated Chono after nearly half-an-hour, during which he had, at one point in the match, beaten Chono so bad that cornerman Hiroyoshi Tenzan threatened to throw in the towel.

During the time of which he would hold the GHC Heavyweight title, he became involved in the tag team division of Noah. He and Tamon Honda were paired together as part of the Burning stable, which had reformed in Noah, and they went ahead to challenge Dark Agent Akitoshi Saito and Jun Akiyama for the GHC Tag Team Championships. Honda and Kobashi defeated the pair to win the belts, making it Kobashi's eighth overall tag team championship in his career. His first defense of the titles came against NJPW talent Togi Makabe and then-IWGP Heavyweight Champion Yoshihiro Takayama on July 16, with Kobashi pinning Makabe to retain the titles. Kobashi defeated Bison Smith to retain the Heavyweight title the next month in Nagoya, and later set up an inter-promotional feud with invader heel Yuji Nagata. Previously in the few months since arriving to Noah, Nagata had defeated both Akiyama decisively and Akira Taue in damage-ranged bouts. Nagata and Kobashi met at the Nippon Budokan on November 1, which Kobashi won. Kobashi also later defeated Yoshinari Ogawa in a title match at the same venue on November 1. After defeating Akira Taue and Battlarts star Daisuke Ikeda in a tag title match on October 24, Nagata and future NJPW ace Hiroshi Tanahashi (working as a heel) defeated Kobashi and Honda to win the GHC Tag Team titles in Sapporo on November 30. Despite his up-comings, Nikkan Sports and Tokyo Sports gave their annual top wrestler awards to Takayama, for his numerous championship victories and inter-promotional dominance, over Kobashi and his GHC Heavyweight title glories. Kobashi was named Wrestling Observer Newsletter Wrestler of the Year in spite of it, and his match with Mitsuharu Misawa on March 1 would be named Match of the Year by all three publications.

In the later part of 2003, Noah announced that it would be holding a show, Departure, in the Tokyo Dome on April 21. At this point, some talks were made to make a champion-versus-champion non-title bout between Kobashi and the now IWGP Heavyweight Champion Hiroyoshi Tenzan, who had beaten Takayama at the Yokohama Dead Out show that November, although it would not occur. After a shocking win against Jun Akiyama, former-Junior Heavyweight star Naoki Sano, who had now gone under the ring-name Takuma Sano, vied for Noah to give him a shot against Kobashi for the GHC Heavyweight title. The match, which took place on January 25 in Kobe, saw Kobashi defeated Sano in around twenty-five minutes. Kobashi and Takeshi Rikio had been booked later on for the next of Kobashi's title defenses after Rikio defeated Akira Taue in a singles match. Rikio, the predominantly-successful tag wrestler (with Takeshi Morishima as Wild II), had been slated to become the first big Noah-grown talent to emerge in Japan. On March 6, Kobashi defeated Rikio in 25 minutes at the Nippon Budokan. After the match, Takayama interrupted a post-match interview with Kobashi to declare his challenge to the GHC Heavyweight title. Takayama, who had just previously lost the IWGP title, was looking to add the GHC Heavyweight title to his arsenal yet again, willing to prove that he is the toughest wrestler in Japan; the match later got set to April 25. The Tokyo Dome card was delayed to July 10, and many higher-ups in Noah looked to push a title match between Kobashi and American gaijin celebrity Bob Sapp, though this never materialized; although, in the potential lead-up to the match, Kobashi and Sapp got into a scuffle, resulting in Kobashi chopping Sapp, and proclaiming his dominance.

In what was built as the pair's first singles match against each-other, Takayama and Kobashi faced off in their highly anticipated match on April 25. According to promoters, the show for the match was sold out within the day. In what was later acclaimed as a highlight in Kobashi's reign, Kobashi defeated Takayama with a moonsault aimed to the head. The title defense at the Tokyo Dome was shifted to put Kobashi in a defense against Jun Akiyama, the first singles match against each-other since the match on December 23, 2000, and the first headliner for both at the Tokyo Dome. In a five-star match, Kobashi defeated Akiyama after over thirty-five minutes of wrestling, with Kobashi ending the match by hitting a Burning Hammer. Akira Taue was selected as the next opponent to Kobashi and his GHC Heavyweight title reign. In preparation for the title match, Taue and Mitsuharu Misawa fought to a thirty-minute draw. In the match, Kobashi debuted the first of what would be the last big move he would innovate, a wrist-clutch variant of the Burning Hammer. After using it on Taue, Kobashi defeated him.

After being built to go against Kobashi the year previous before being beaten out by Tamon Honda, Akitoshi Saito was finally given a chance to challenge Kobashi for the GHC Heavyweight Championship on October 24 in Osaka. Kobashi defeated Saito, but not before being given respect from the champion in the process of the loss. As a result of the defense, which was Kobashi's eleventh, this would mean that Kobashi had become the most successfully-defensive major champion in modern puroresu history up to that point. It had beat out Yuji Nagata's ten-defense reign as IWGP Heavyweight Champion and Toshiaki Kawada's ten-defense reign as Triple Crown Heavyweight Champion; all of which those titles had occurred at the same time. Kobashi's final successful championship match of 2004, and his twelfth overall, was against Mike Awesome, who had gone under the ring-name The Gladiator.

After 22 months and twelve successful title defenses, Kobashi was scheduled to face the Takayama-allied Pancrase MISSION representative Minoru Suzuki for the GHC Heavyweight title at the January 8, 2005 Nippon Budokan event. During the lead-up, Kobashi was announced as the Nikkan Sports Pro Wrestling MVP and the Wrestling Observer Newsletter Wrestler of the Year for the second year in a row, and his match against Jun Akiyama was named the Match of the Year by both Nikkan Sports and Tokyo Sports, as well as being internationally regarded as the Match of the Year by the Wrestling Observer Newsletter. Kobashi was also listed as the Best Box Office Draw by the latter newsletter for the year of 2004. At the aforementioned event in the Nippon Budokan, Kobashi defeated Suzuki, making it Kobashi's thirteenth overall successful defense of the title, extending his record. On March 1, 2005, Kobashi officially hit two years (731 days) as champion; four days later, on March 5, he faced Takeshi Rikio in a rematch for the title. Rikio earned a pin over Kobashi in a tag tournament, and had considerable performances against other top wrestlers in Noah. Rikio defeated Kobashi to win the title with a Muso slam, ending his 735-day reign with 13 successful defenses. The commentator after the win declared in Japanese, "the Absolute Champion is defeated!", and celebrated Rikio's win.

==== Post GHC Heavyweight title reign (2005–2008) ====
Despite the loss of his title, Kobashi remained Noah's top wrestler, and the rest of the year was highlighted by matches with outsiders such as Genichiro Tenryu and Kensuke Sasaki. In the latter award-winning match against Sasaki at the Destiny show in July 2005, Kobashi and Sasaki fought in a twenty-three minute bout where Kobashi would come out on top, but not before it was noted for its delirious knife-edged chop exchanges. The match also saw the return of Kobashi's Grand Sword theme song, replacing Blazin'. In the following year, he had praised matches against junior heavyweights such as KENTA and Naomichi Marufuji. In late 2005, Kobashi made his first appearance in North America with Harley Race's World League Wrestling promotion, defeating then WLW champion Wild Wade Chism and being awarded with Race's NWA World's Heavyweight Championship belt. The subsequent celebration was marred with Race proclaiming that Kobashi was "Mr. Pro Wrestling". His second and third North American appearances were for Ring of Honor, where he defeated Samoa Joe in a memorable singles match (given a full five-stars by the Wrestling Observer as well as their Match of the Year award for 2005), and teamed with Homicide to defeat the tag team of Low Ki and Joe. Kobashi also traveled to Europe, where he had matches in Germany, and at Universal Uproar in England, on November 12, 2005. The next night, on November 13, Kobashi defeated wXw World Heavyweight Champion Ares in a non-title match. On November 5, 2005, Go Shiozaki, a trainee of Kobashi and Misawa that had debuted the year before, teamed with Kobashi, losing to the Kensuke Office affiliated team of Kensuke Sasaki and Katsuhiko Nakajima. Kobashi made his debut in Kensuke Office on February 11, 2006, teaming with Sasaki to defeat Nakajima and Genichiro Tenryu as part of Sasaki's 20th Anniversary show.

After winning the GHC Tag Team Championship again with Tamon Honda on June 4, 2006, against Muhammed Yone and Takeshi Morishima, Kobashi became inactive due to cancer, resulting in his partner Tamon Honda returning the belts on September 26. Kobashi had been proclaimed to have a tumor on his kidney, and a biopsy confirmed it to be cancerous. The initial treatment for his cancer was a five-and-a-half hour laparoscopic nephrectomy, followed later by chemotherapy. The night before, doctors alerted Kobashi that if this surgery were to be performed, then Kobashi's in-ring career would be in jeopardy. On December 10, at the Nippon Budokan, Kobashi appeared before the fans and announced that he would return "without fail". On September 8, 2007, news broke that Kobashi would make his return on the December 2, 2007 Budokan Hall event where he would team up with Yoshihiro Takayama to face Akiyama and Misawa. On the card, Misawa would pin Kobashi with an top-rope Emerald Flowsion, but the fans still gave Kobashi a rousing ovation.

During the 2008 Global Tag League tournament finals in April 2008, he, KENTA and Honda defeated Takayama, Shiozaki and Takuma Sano in a six-man tag team match. On June 14, Kobashi and KENTA would face their respective rivals, Kensuke Sasaki and Katsuhiko Nakajima, during the Great Voyage 2008 In Yokohama; the match resulted in a thirty-minute time limit draw, with Nakajima and KENTA brawling after the match. On June 22, Kobashi took part in the European Navigation tour, competing at a wXw crossed-over program. Teaming with Shiozaki, he faced "Bad Bones" John Klinger and Big Van Walter, later widely known as Gunther, in a successful effort. He made his return to Kensuke Office on August 17, competing in an Eight-Man Tag Team Survival Match. He teamed with Pro Wrestling Noah younger talents KENTA, Atsushi Aoki and Akihiko Ito, losing to Nakajima, Sasaki, Kento Miyahara and Takashi Okita. Kobashi lasted for nearly forty minutes in the match overall, and ended when Nakajima pinned KENTA after hitting a Death Roll kick whilst Sasaki was holding Kobashi in the outside of the ring, preventing him from saving the match after a thirty-five minute period.

==== Double-arm surgery, final years & retirement (2008–2013) ====
In September 2008, Kobashi underwent emergency surgery on both of his arms. The surgery was successful, and Kobashi was expected to make a full recovery. Kobashi was expected to be out of action for up to a year, but he would return to the ring less than six months later. Doctors had advised he discontinue the usage of the machine-gun knife-edged chops that he'd perform in his matches due to a risk of furthering ulnar nerve paralysis, but he refused. Prior to returning to the ring, Kobashi stated that he wanted to start in opening matches, and rebuild himself to be a main event player. Kobashi made his return to wrestling on March 1, 2009, at Nippon Budokan, defeating Masao Inoue in the opening match of the card with the Burning Lariat. Kobashi won the GHC Openweight Hardcore Championship, his final championship, from Makoto Hashi on June 8 in Hachiōji during Noah's Southern Navigation tour.

Mitsuharu Misawa died on June 13, 2009, in a show in Hiroshima, leaving Akira Taue to fill the role as head of Noah's booking team and presidency. On August 30, 2009, Kobashi returned to All Japan Pro Wrestling for one night only, competing in his first match for the company in nine years. Kobashi teamed with Akihiko Ito and fellow AJPW alumnus Tsuyoshi Kikuchi in a losing effort to then-current AJPW stars and representatives Satoshi Kojima, KAI and Hiroshi Yamato at Pro Wrestling Love in Ryogoku, Volume 8. On December 23, 2009, Kobashi was seriously injured in a three-way match against Honda and Kikuchi. He was sidelined for 19 months with nerve damage in his right arm, mainly from the usage of his knife-edged chops. Kobashi declined the advice to stop using the move, and continued using the move until he retired. Kobashi made his return on July 23, 2011, teaming with Go Shiozaki in a tag team match, where they were defeated by Akitoshi Saito and Jun Akiyama. On August 27, 2011, he debuted his new temporary charity ring gear, mixing his later-stage black and early-stage orange at the inaugural All Together show at Nippon Budokan, teaming up with Keiji Muto to defeat Chaos members Takashi Iizuka and Toru Yano. On October 6, it was announced by Noah that Kobashi had stepped down from his position as an Executive Vice President of the promotion.

On December 3, 2012, Noah confirmed that they had released the now-45 year old Kobashi from his contract, which had been decreased to exclusive in-ring competition. The news sparked shockwaves in Japan, as Atsushi Aoki, Shiozaki, Akiyama, Kotaro Suzuki, and Yoshinobu Kanemaru spoke out, declaring their intent of not re-signing with Noah after their contracts expire in January, out of loyalty to Kobashi. On December 9, Kobashi attended Noah's Ryōgoku Kokugikan event and, during an in-ring interview, he revealed that he was planned to retire in a Noah ring in 2013. Noah and Kobashi seemingly came to an agreement to let him retire as opposed to forcing him to leave the promotion. Despite this change in plans, Noah confirmed on December 19 that Akiyama, Shiozaki, Suzuki, Kanemaru and Aoki all would be leaving the promotion after December 24. On January 23, 2013, Kobashi announced that his retirement match would take place on at the Nippon Budokan. Kobashi's retirement event, Final Burning in Budokan took place on May 11. His retirement ceremony was held after the second match on the show and was attended by former Japanese Prime Minister Yoshihiko Noda, legendary NTV announcers Akira Fukuzawa and Kazuo Tokumitsu, former colleagues Akira Taue, Hiroshi Hase, Masahiro Chono, Mitsuo Momota, Toshiaki Kawada, and Stan Hansen (the latter via video message), along with many others. In the main event, Kobashi teamed with Jun Akiyama, Keiji Muto, and Kensuke Sasaki in an eight-man tag team match, where they defeated Kobashi's Noah and All Japan-affiliated protégés: Shiozaki, KENTA, Maybach Taniguchi, and Kanemaru. In the match, Kobashi pinned Kanemaru with a moonsault for the final win of his career. The event at Nippon Budokan was attended by 17,000 fans and aired live across Japan on the television network BS Sky! and in movie theaters.

=== Post-retirement (2013–present) ===
On March 17, 2013, Kobashi made an appearance for All Japan Pro Wrestling to promote his retirement match. Before the main event, Hiroshi Hase announced that he would be resigning as Pacific Wrestling Federation (PWF) chairman to focus on the National Diet and that Kobashi would be replacing him, after his retirement on May 11. On September 8, Kobashi appeared as a color commentator at All Japan splinter promotion Wrestle-1's inaugural event. On October 27, it was confirmed that Kobashi would not be joining All Japan after all, when Dory Funk Jr. was announced as the new PWF chairman.

On February 14, 2014, Kobashi announced that starting June 8, he would begin producing his own independent events under the brand "Fortune Dream". The inaugural event featured wrestlers from various promotions, including All Japan Pro Wrestling, Big Japan Pro Wrestling, Kaientai Dojo, Pro Wrestling Zero1 and Wrestling New Classic.

On May 10, 2015, Kobashi returned to Noah to serve as a "special witness" for a GHC Heavyweight Championship match between champion Minoru Suzuki and challenger Naomichi Marufuji. Kobashi's role included making sure that the Suzuki-gun stable did not interfere in the match.

In September 2023, he made an appearance for DDT Pro Wrestling's Shinkansen specialty match between Minoru Suzuki and Sanshiro Takagi. Notably, during the appearance, he did a gyaku-suihei chop (knife-edged chop) on Suzuki, who also won the match later on. He assumed the role of a ticket checker on the Shinkansen train. Other wrestlers who appeared in the match included the now-DDT signed Jun Akiyama, Kazunari Murakami and Hikaru Sato.

== Professional wrestling style and persona ==
Kobashi is known by the "Maximum Innovator" (最大のイノベーター, Saidai no Inobeita) moniker in terms of his wrestling ability for popularizing and/or innovating several wrestling moves throughout his career. Among those moves include:

- the moonsault, which was used predominantly as his finishing move until 1996
- the double under-hooked DDT (which would later be used and modified by the likes of Jon Moxley, Mick Foley, Drew McIntyre and Crash Holly)
- the Burning Hammer and its wrist-clutch variant (which would later be adopted into a signature maneuver by the likes of AJ Styles, Michael Elgin and Dan Maff in tribute to Kobashi)
- the Machine Gun Chops, multiple knife-edged chops to an opponent from the ropes or turnbuckles (which would later be replicated by wrestlers such as Eddie Kingston and, most notably, Satoshi Kojima)
- the Orange Crush, a suplex that had transitioned into a sit-out powerbomb (notably modified by El Generico)

Kobashi is known to have not gone any time in his career being a heel. With his noted work as a determined, belligerent wrestler, it made him more likeable with the crowd, especially at the early stages of his career. Showing that he'd never give up in his career, Kobashi's presence in the ring was always noted for his determination to endure and deal damage, as seen evidently in his championship matches against his fellow Four Heavenly Kings: Misawa, Kawada and Taue.

== Personal life ==
Kobashi was known in the locker room to be friendly and unreserved for conversations with his fellow peers. Notably, in the AJPW dojo, he got along with Mitsuharu Misawa's daughter Kaede, playing with her whilst her father trained. Kobashi and Misawa have been described as brothers, notably with Misawa seeing himself as Kobashi's ani (兄), or elder brother.

Known for his passion towards bodybuilding and training, Kobashi owns and operates a branch of Anytime Fitness in Setagaya, Tokyo.

Kobashi married his girlfriend of 14 years, singer Mizuki (née Mai), on October 2, 2010. In August 2015, Mai gave birth to the couple's first child, a daughter.

== Legacy ==
Kobashi has the fifth-most 5-star matches (as rated by the Wrestling Observer Newsletter) with 23. In 2002, he was inducted by Dave Meltzer into the Wrestling Observer Newsletter Hall of Fame as the third inductee of the 2002 class and the 148th inductee overall, for his accomplishments in AJPW and Noah. For his last match on May 11, 2013, he was presented a replica of the GHC Heavyweight Championship belt as a farewell gift by the Noah staff and wrestlers. Del "The Patriot" Wilkes considered him as the greatest wrestler of all time, and Eddie Kingston labeled him a "perfect wrestler". Kobashi has stated that he was "happy" knowing that Gunther, also known as Walter, was influenced by him.

== Championships and accomplishments ==
- All Japan Pro Wrestling
  - All Asia Tag Team Championship (4 times) – with Tiger Mask II (1), Johnny Ace (2), and Tsuyoshi Kikuchi (1)
  - Triple Crown Heavyweight Championship (3 times)
  - World Tag Team Championship (6 times) – with Mitsuharu Misawa (2), Johnny Ace (2), and Jun Akiyama (2)
  - Champion Carnival (2000)
  - January 2 Korakuen Hall Heavyweight Battle Royal (1993)
  - One Night Six Man Tag Team Tournament (1999) – with Jun Akiyama and Kentaro Shiga
  - World's Strongest Tag Determination League (1993–1995) – with Mitsuharu Misawa
  - World's Strongest Tag Determination League (1998, 1999) – with Jun Akiyama
  - World's Strongest Tag Determination League Fresh Award (1991) – with Tsuyoshi Kikuchi
- International Professional Wrestling Hall of Fame
  - Class of 2023
- Nikkan Sports
  - Match of the Year (1997) vs. Mitsuharu Misawa on October 21
  - Match of the Year (1998) vs. Mitsuharu Misawa on October 31
  - Match of the Year (2003) vs. Mitsuharu Misawa on March 1
  - Match of the Year (2004) vs. Jun Akiyama on July 10
  - Match of the Year (2005) vs. Kensuke Sasaki on July 18
  - Match of the Year (2007) with Yoshihiro Takayama vs. Mitsuharu Misawa and Jun Akiyama on December 2
  - Outstanding Performance Award (1996)
  - Fighting Spirit Award (1997, 2007, 2008)
  - Wrestler of the Year (1996, 1998, 2004, 2005)
- Pro Wrestling Illustrated
  - Ranked No. 4 of the top 500 singles wrestlers in the PWI 500 in 1996, 2000, and 2004
  - Ranked No. 33 of the top 500 singles wrestlers of the "PWI Years" in 2003
  - Ranked No. 6 of the top 100 tag teams of the "PWI Years" with Mitsuharu Misawa in 2003
- Pro Wrestling Noah
  - GHC Heavyweight Championship (1 time)
  - GHC Openweight Hardcore Championship (1 time)
  - GHC Tag Team Championship (2 times) – with Tamon Honda
  - One Day Six Man Tag Team Tournament (2002) – with Kenta and Kentaro Shiga
- Tokyo Sports
  - Comeback Award (2007)
  - Lifetime Achievement Award (2013)
  - Match of the Year (1995) with Mitsuharu Misawa vs. Akira Taue and Toshiaki Kawada on June 9, 1995
  - Match of the Year (1997) vs. Mitsuharu Misawa on October 21, 1997
  - Match of the Year (1998) vs. Mitsuharu Misawa on October 31, 1998
  - Match of the Year (2003) vs. Mitsuharu Misawa on March 1, 2003
  - Match of the Year (2004) vs. Jun Akiyama on July 10, 2004
  - Match of the Year (2005) vs. Kensuke Sasaki on July 18, 2005
  - Match of the Year (2007) with Yoshihiro Takayama vs. Mitsuharu Misawa and Jun Akiyama on December 2, 2007
  - Match of the Year (2011) with Keiji Mutoh vs. Takashi Iizuka and Toru Yano, All Together, August 27
  - Rookie of the Year (1989)
  - Tag Team of the Year (1993, 1994) with Mitsuharu Misawa
  - Tag Team of the Year (1999) with Jun Akiyama
  - Wrestler of the Year (1996, 1998)
- Wrestling Observer Newsletter
  - Best Box Office Draw (2004, 2005)
  - Best Wrestling Maneuver (1998) Burning Hammer
  - Match of the Year (1992) with Tsuyoshi Kikuchi vs. Doug Furnas and Phil Lafon on May 25
  - Match of the Year (1998) vs. Mitsuharu Misawa on October 31
  - Match of the Year (1999) vs Mitsuharu Misawa on June 11
  - Match of the Year (2003) vs. Mitsuharu Misawa on March 1
  - Match of the Year (2004) vs. Jun Akiyama on July 10
  - Match of the Year (2005) vs. Samoa Joe on October 1 at Joe vs. Kobashi
  - Most Improved Wrestler (1990)
  - Most Outstanding Wrestler (1993, 1994)
  - Tag Team of the Year (1995) with Mitsuharu Misawa
  - Tag Team of the Year (1999) with Jun Akiyama
  - Wrestler of the Year (1996, 2003–2005)
  - Wrestling Observer Newsletter Hall of Fame (Class of 2002)
