= Global Professional Wrestling Alliance =

Group of professional wrestling promotions and wrestlers

- Acronym: GPWA
- Founded: 2006
- Defunct: 2009
- Style: Puroresu
- Headquarters: Japan
- Founders: Mitsuharu Misawa; Yoshiyuki Nakamura
- Owner: Yoshiyuki Nakamura
- Website: Official website

The Global Professional Wrestling Alliance (GPWA) was a cooperative group of professional wrestling promotions and wrestlers from around the world. Formed in 2006, the group was founded by the professional wrestler Mitsuharu Misawa, the founder of Pro Wrestling Noah. It was led by president Yoshiyuki Nakamura, co-owner of Pro Wrestling Zero1. The organization folded in 2009.

== Aims ==
The group was established in 2006 as a means to aid the many competing wrestling promotions in Japan. Members would share resources including training facilities and their wrestlers themselves. They would also coordinate the arrangements of their shows in order to avoid clashes. In addition to this "super shows" would be run with wrestlers from the member promotions competing on the same shows, the first of which occurred on November 14, 2006.

== Members ==
=== Promotions ===
Promotion	Representative	Country
Big Mouth Loud	Kazunari Murakami	Japan
DDT Pro-Wrestling	Sanshiro Takagi	Japan
European Wrestling Association	Chris Raaber	Austria
International Wrestling Association of Japan	Tatsukuni Asano	Japan
Kaientai Dojo	Taka Michinoku	Japan
Kensuke Office	Hisako Sasaki	Japan
Pro-Wrestling Eldorado	Noriaki Kawabata	Japan
Pro Wrestling Noah	Akira Taue	Japan
Pro Wrestling World-1	Steve Corino	United States
Pro Wrestling Zero1-Max	Shinjiro Otani	Japan
Ring of Honor	Cary Silkin	United States
World League Wrestling	Harley Race	United States

=== Freelance wrestlers ===
- Takaku Fuke
- Tomoaki Honma
- Kikutaro
- Shiro Koshinaka
- Mazada
- Nosawa
- Munenori Sawa
- Minoru Suzuki
- Yoshihiro Takayama
- Tadao Yasuda
- Yuta Yoshikawa

== See also ==
- Professional wrestling in Japan
- List of professional wrestling promotions in Japan
