= Makoto Hashi =

Japanese professional wrestler

Personal information
- Born: May 10, 1977 (age 49) Fukuyama, Hiroshima, Japan

Professional wrestling career
- Ring name: Makoto Hashi
- Billed height: 1.80 m (5 ft 11 in)
- Billed weight: 98 kg (216 lb)
- Trained by: Jun Akiyama
- Debut: March 25, 1998
- Retired: 2012

Makoto Hashi (橋 誠, Hashi Makoto) (born May 10, 1977) is a former Japanese professional wrestler, best known for his appearances in Pro Wrestling Noah.

== Career ==
Hashi's first championship reign in Noah came after he defeated Naomichi Marufuji for the GHC Junior Heavyweight Championship via stoppage; however, unsatisfied with his victory, Hashi vacated the title the following day, leading to a tournament which was later won by Yoshinobu Kanemaru.

Hashi won the GHC Openweight Hardcore Championship on October 6, 2008 from Kishin Kawabata. Hashi successfully defended the title in his first defence vs Akihito Ito on January 14, 2009. On February 26, 2009 Hashi defended the GHC Openweight Hardcore Championship for the second time defeating Genba Hirayanagi. On June 8, 2009 Hashi lost the GHC Openweight Hardcore Championship to the legendary Kenta Kobashi.

In June 2012, it was announced due to several neck injuries that he would retire and now works as a Physical Therapy Assistant.

== Championships and accomplishments ==
- Pro Wrestling Noah
  - GHC Junior Heavyweight Championship (1 time)
  - GHC Openweight Hardcore Championship (1 time)
  - One Night Junior Heavyweight Six Man Tag Team Tournament (2003) - with Yoshinobu Kanemaru and Takashi Sugiura
