= Hikaru Kawabata =

Japanese professional wrestler (born 1965)

Personal information
- Born: April 29, 1965 (age 61) Ōshima District, Kagoshima, Japan

Professional wrestling career
- Ring name: Kishin Kawabata
- Billed height: 1.80 m (5 ft 11 in)
- Billed weight: 110 kg (240 lb; 17 st)
- Trained by: Kazuo Sakurada
- Debut: September 16, 1991

Hikaru Kawabata (川畑輝) (born April 29, 1965) is a Japanese professional wrestler, who wrestles as Kishin Kawabata (川畑輝鎮). He is best known for his time in Pro Wrestling Noah.

== Career ==
A former college sumo wrestler, Kawabata joined Super World Sports' dojo in February 1991. On September 16, 1991, he made his debut teaming with Nobukazu Hirai against Akira Katayama and Tetsuya Yamanaka. After SWS closed in June 1992, he moved on to successor company Network of Wrestling run by his trainer Kazuo Sakurada. On January 8, 1993, he received serious injuries when a truck in which he was riding crashed. In the same crash, fellow rookie wrestler Toshimitsu Naoi was killed. After NOW closed he worked as a freelancer, for independent companies including Tokyo Pro Wrestling.

Kawabata made his debut for Noah on December 23, 2000. Initially remaining a freelancer, he signed a contract in 2001. At the end of 2009, his contract ended and he became a freelancer once more, moving back to Kagoshima and largely only appearing on wrestling shows there. In 2017, he opened a karaoke bar Himawari. His most recent match was for Big Japan Pro Wrestling in 2021.

== Championships and accomplishments ==
- Flemish Wrestling Force

- Flemish Wrestling Cup (2007)

- Pro Wrestling Noah

- GHC Openweight / Hardcore Tag Team Championship (2 times)^{1}
- GHC Hardcore Tag Team Championship Tournament (2007) - with Kentaro Shiga

^{1} When the GHC Openweight Hardcore Championship was rechristened to the GHC Hardcore Tag Team Championship, Kawabata won the title with Kentaro Shiga.
