= Jun Akiyama =

Japanese professional wrestler (born 1969)

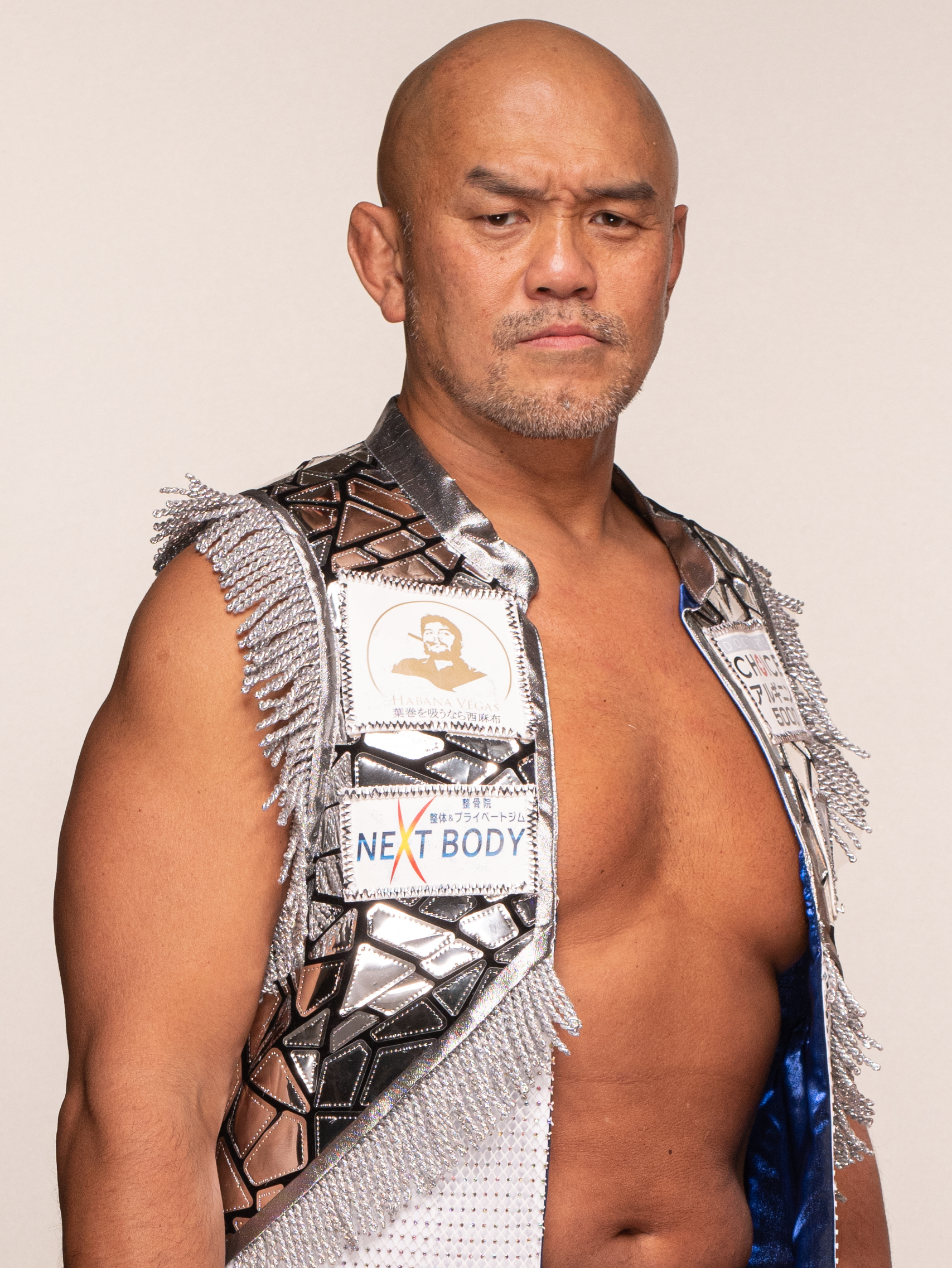
- Jun Akiyama in 2022

Personal information
- Born: October 9, 1969 (age 57) Izumi, Osaka, Japan

Professional wrestling career
- Ring name(s): AJ Ranger White; Jun Akiyama; Mr. Christmas; Shura; Uesugi Kenshin; White Santa
- Billed height: 1.88 m (6 ft 2 in)
- Billed weight: 110 kg (243 lb)
- Debut: September 17, 1992

Jun Akiyama (秋山 潤, Akiyama Jun; ring name: 秋山 準) (born October 9, 1969) is a Japanese professional wrestler, He is signed to DDT Pro-Wrestling, where he is a former KO-D Openweight Champion, former one-time DDT Extreme Champion, former four-time Ironman Heavymetalweight Champion and former KO-D Six Man Tag Team Champion. He is best known for his time with All Japan Pro Wrestling (AJPW), where he was the president, representative director, co-head booker, and an in-ring performer. In AJPW, he is a former two-time Triple Crown Heavyweight Champion and former longest reign one-time Gaora TV Champion, while also being a six-time overall professional wrestling world champion.

Akiyama is noted for his serious in-ring style and demeanor, innovating the Blue Thunder Driver and the wrist–clutch exploder suplex maneuvers. Considered an outstanding tag team wrestler, Akiyama is a three-time winner of the Wrestling Observer Newsletter Tag Team of the Year award.

== Personal life ==
In junior high school, Akiyama participated in swimming and in senior high school he competed in freestyle amateur wrestling and judo. After high school, he attended Senshu University in Tokyo, where he joined an amateur wrestling team that produced other professional wrestlers like Riki Choshu, Hiroshi Hase, and Manabu Nakanishi.

Akiyama is close friends with fellow AJPW and Noah alumni Kenta Kobashi, with whom he has a sarcastic backstage relationship.

== Professional wrestling career ==
=== All Japan Pro Wrestling (1992–2000) ===
Akiyama had great success as an amateur wrestler and was eventually scouted by All Japan Pro Wrestling (AJPW). He made his professional wrestling debut on September 17, 1992 in a match against Kenta Kobashi, which he lost. He gradually rose in rank, starting to team up with Akira Taue as part of what remained of Jumbo Tsuruta's team called "Tsuruta-Gun", earning a trial series in January 1993. Afterward, he started working tag teams. The tag team division soon became his speciality, teaming with Takao Omori against Kenta Kobashi and Mitsuharu Misawa. In January 1995, he split with Taue, and alongside Omori, won the All Asia Tag Team Championship, holding the belts for 1,076 days, until dropping them to Johnny Smith and Wolf Hawkfield on January 9, 1998, and also having the longest single reign in the history of those belts, even though sometimes he and Omori parted ways to team up with other wrestlers during that time. In early 1996, he was selected to be Misawa's partner after he split with Kobashi back in December. The two teamed together successfully and won the World Tag Team Championship during 1996. Akiyama and Misawa also competed in the World's Strongest Tag Determination League tournaments in 1996 and 1997, but lost in successive years to the team of Toshiaki Kawada and Akira Taue. Akiyama then began closing in on the Triple Crown Heavyweight Championship, first challenging Misawa in September 1997 and January 1998, Kobashi in July 1998, and Vader in January 2000. He was unsuccessful on all four occasions.

After teaming with Misawa, Akiyama began teaming with Kenta Kobashi to form 'Burning'. The team won numerous tag team titles and competed against the teams of Mitsuharu Misawa and Yoshinari Ogawa, Toshiaki Kawada and Akira Taue, Yoshihiro Takayama and Takao Omori and others. Burning also won the World's Strongest Tag Determination League tournament in 1998 by defeating the team of Stan Hansen and Vader, and again in 1999 by defeating Akira Taue and Stan Hansen. Akiyama's last major victory in All Japan Pro Wrestling was on February 27, 2000, when he defeated former tag team partner Mitsuharu Misawa by pinfall in a heated and highly acclaimed contest. His last match happened on July 20, where he and Jun Izumida lost to Takao Omori and Yoshihiro Takayama, and after that, he and other 25 wrestlers left to follow up Misawa to form Pro Wrestling Noah.

=== Pro Wrestling Noah (2000–2012) ===
After a controversy in AJPW over the direction and management, he left the company with Mitsuharu Misawa, and half the roster, for Misawa's newly created Pro Wrestling Noah in mid-2000. Like many other members who made the jump, Akiyama gave himself a makeover, dropping his trademark blue and white trimmed boots and blue trunks for white boots and trunks and dyed his hair brown. He was quickly established as a top star of the company, winning both falls in the main event of Noah's first show, choking out Kenta Kobashi in the second Noah show the night after he turned heel for this first time in his career, and becoming the second GHC Heavyweight Champion, He had stellar title defenses in New Japan Pro-Wrestling against Yuji Nagata and Hiroshi Tanahashi. But a lack of worthy contenders eventually forced Noah to abandon his push, using Yoshinari Ogawa and Yoshihiro Takayama to transition the title back to Misawa. He continued work in Noah as a tag team competitor again to critical acclaim, winning the GHC Tag Team Championship with Akitoshi Saito.

In April 2004, he created the GHC Openweight Hardcore Championship to get back into singles competitions, and adapting an attitude manifested by wearing trunks that were odd colors for him. These motives helped put him back into contention for the GHC title against Kenta Kobashi, which was voted as Match of the Year. Late 2004 and much of 2005 were highlighted by his feud with protégé Makoto Hashi where Akiyama used "tough love" to toughen up young Hashi. On January 22, 2006, Akiyama defeated Akira Taue to become the GHC Heavyweight Champion for the second time, defending the title against Minoru Suzuki on March 5 and Masao Inoue on April 24. Akiyama was defeated by Naomichi Marufuji on Noah's September 9 Nippon Budokan show in his third defense of the GHC Heavyweight Title.

Following his title loss to Naomichi Marufuji, Akiyama made good his promise to Tsuyoshi Kikuchi, going back to wearing blue trunks, and wrestling mainly in the undercard. He successfully redeemed himself by defeating Kikuchi and once again wore white trunks following that match. This put him back in line for success, which had him winning the tag titles a second time with Takeshi Rikio. Due to an injury to Rikio, they were forced to vacate the title. Akiyama competed at New Japan Pro-Wrestling's third Annual "Wrestle Kingdom in Tokyo Dome" show, defeating Manabu Nakanishi.

On March 1, 2009, Akiyama defeated Kensuke Sasaki for the GHC Heavyweight Championship. On June 14, 2009, he was forced to vacate the title due to injury, in which left him out of action for the rest of the tour. After making his return later that year, Akiyama continued to wrestle sporadically whilst struggling with back injuries and the burden of post traumatic stress syndrome, following the death of Mitsuharu Misawa.

Akiyama participated in the first Global League, achieving a total of eight points with four wins and just one loss. As the Block B winner, he faced Block A winner Yoshihiro Takayama in the final match on May 2. Takayama won the tournament by pinning Akiyama with an Everest German suplex.

In April 2011, Akiyama and Akitoshi Saito won the 2011 Global Tag League.

On October 23, 2011, Akiyama defeated Suwama to finally win All Japan's Triple Crown Heavyweight Championship, the belt he could not win during his eight-year run with the promotion before leaving for Pro-Wrestling Noah. Shortly after winning the Triple Crown, Akiyama adopted a new look as he shaved his head bald. On January 22, Akiyama and Saito defeated Bad Intentions (Giant Bernard and Karl Anderson) to win the GHC Tag Team Championship. He has successfully defended the Triple Crown against Taiyō Kea (twice), Takao Omori and Keiji Mutoh. Akiyama lost the Triple Crown to Masakatsu Funaki on August 26, 2012, in a match that lasted less than five minutes.

On December 3, 2012, it was reported that Akiyama had threatened to not re-sign with Noah after his contract expires in January 2013, when the promotion released Kenta Kobashi from his contract. On December 19, Noah confirmed that Akiyama would leave the promotion on December 24. On December 24, Akiyama, working as "Mr. Christmas", defeated his trainee Atsushi Aoki in both men's final Noah match.

=== Return to AJPW (2013–2021) ===
On January 26, 2013, Akiyama, Atsushi Aoki, Go Shiozaki, Kotaro Suzuki and Yoshinobu Kanemaru, all of whom had quit Noah at the same time, announced that they had joined All Japan Pro Wrestling, reforming the "Burning" stable, which he previously formed with Kenta Kobashi in the late 1990s. On March 17, Akiyama and Shiozaki defeated Get Wild (Manabu Soya and Takao Omori) to win the World Tag Team Championship. On April 29, Akiyama defeated Kai in the finals to win the 2013 Champion Carnival. On May 11, Akiyama made a one-night return to Noah to take part in Kenta Kobashi's retirement match at Final Burning in Budokan, where he, Kobashi, Keiji Mutoh and Kensuke Sasaki defeated Go Shiozaki, Kenta, Maybach Taniguchi and Yoshinobu Kanemaru. On June 30, Akiyama received his shot at the Triple Crown Heavyweight Championship, which he had earned by winning the Champion Carnival, but was defeated by the defending champion, Suwama. On July 5, following a mass exodus led by Keiji Mutoh, it was announced that Akiyama, along with the rest of Burning, had signed an exclusive contract with All Japan. On October 22, Akiyama and Shiozaki lost the World Tag Team Championship to Evolution (Joe Doering and Suwama). During the next week, Burning was hit hard with Shiozaki, Aoki and Suzuki all announcing that they were quitting the stable. On January 26, 2014, Akiyama and Kanemaru defeated former stablemates Aoki and Suzuki to win the All Asia Tag Team Championship. Following the win, Akiyama, attempting to become the first wrestler in 15 years to hold the All Asia and the World Tag Team Championships simultaneously, formed another tag team named "Wild Burning" with Takao Omori. Akiyama and Omori received their title shot on February 8, but were defeated by the defending champions, Joe Doering and Suwama. On April 29, Akiyama and Kanemaru lost the All Asia Tag Team Championship to Keisuke Ishii and Shigehiro Irie at a Dramatic Dream Team event. Later that same event, Akiyama "accidentally" won the Ironman Heavymetalweight Championship, after laying his arm on it during a backstage interview.

On June 4, it was reported that Akiyama was taking over as the new president of All Japan, effective July 1. All Japan confirmed the report with an official announcement the following day. Akiyama runs the new All Japan Pro Wrestling through a company named Zen Nihon Puroresu Innovation, while also serving as the promotion's representative director. On June 15, Akiyama was placed in a decision match to determine a new Triple Crown Heavyweight Champion, but was defeated by Takao Omori. On June 28, Akiyama and Omori defeated Joe Doering and Suwama to win the World Tag Team Championship. After successfully defending the World Tag Team Championship against Akebono and Yutaka Yoshie on October 22, Akiyama and Omori vacated the title the following day in time for the 2014 World's Strongest Tag Determination League. They regained the title by winning the tournament on December 6, defeating Go Shiozaki and Kento Miyahara in the finals. Wild Burning's second reign ended on March 22, 2015, when they were defeated by Akebono and Yutaka Yoshie. On September 26, Akiyama defeated Akebono in the finals to win the 2015 Ōdō Tournament. On November 1, Akyama defeated Akebono to win the Triple Crown Heavyweight Championship for the second time. He lost the title to Suwama on January 2, 2016. On August 11, Akiyama made a rare appearance outside of AJPW, when he took part in an event held by its splinter promotion Wrestle-1. Akiyama teamed with fellow AJPW wrestlers Naoya Nomura and Yuma Aoyagi to defeat the Wrestle-1 trio of Keiji Mutoh, Koji Doi and Kumagoro in an interpromotional six-man tag team match.

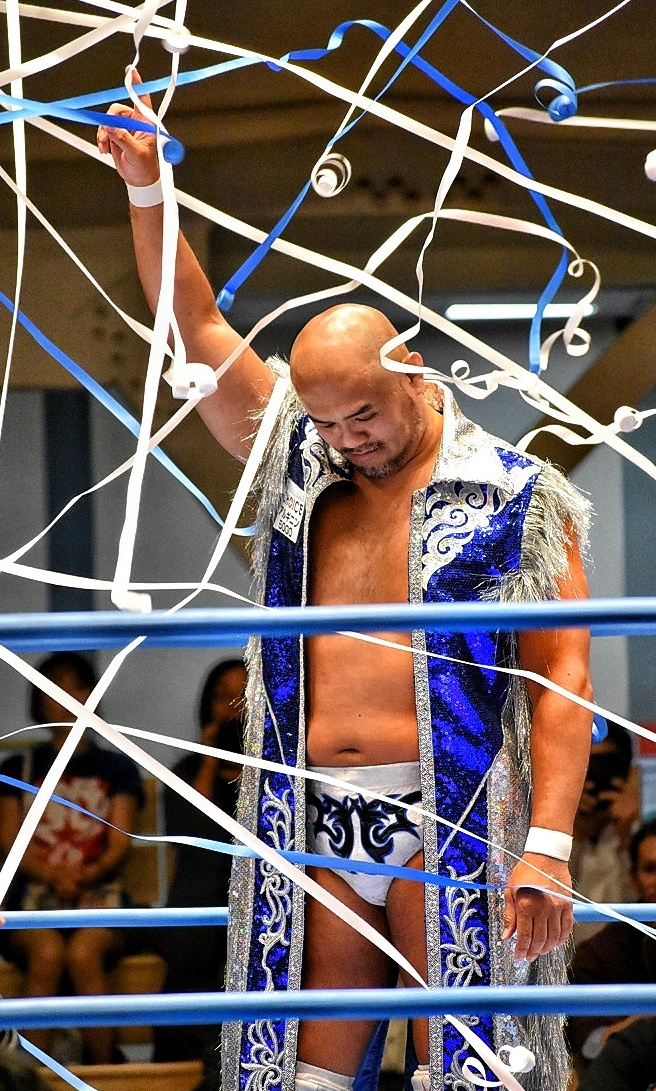
Akiyama in 2019

On March 12, 2017, Akiyama defeated Kenso to win the Gaora TV Championship for the first time. His Gaora TV Title reign was mostly the midcard in comedy or gimmick-heavy matches as he wanted to settle down into a midcard role. During this run, he teamed with Takao Omori to again win the AJPW World Tag Team Championship in October 2017, celebrating both men's 25th anniversaries in wrestling. The match, which was originally supposed to be against reigning champions Strong BJ (Daisuke Sekimoto and Yuji Okabayashi) of Big Japan Pro Wrestling, was changed before the show due to Okabayashi suffering a major shoulder injury and being forced to vacate. Big Japan's Ryuji Ito filled-in for Okabayashi. Wild Burning lost the tag title on January 3, 2018, to 2017 World's Strongest Tag Determination League winners, Suwama and Shuji Ishikawa. With Takao Omori going down injured around this time, Akiyama revived his old partnership with Yuji Nagata to challenge for the All Asia Tag Team Championship, held by NEXTREAM's Naoya Nomura and Yuma Aoyagi. The match, scheduled for February 3, was changed due to Yuma suffering a broken ankle and vacating the title. Ryoji Sai filled in as Naoya Nomura's partner in a losing effort to Nagata and Akiyama. When Takao Omori returned from injury he too chose to revisit an old partnership – teaming with Manabu Nakanishi in a Wild Child reunion to unsuccessfully challenge both men's regular partners on March 25. Despite saying in 2017 he wanted to take a step back from tournaments and main event titles, Akiyama participated in the 2018 Champion Carnival, presumably because of the large amount of injuries the rest of the roster was facing. In the B Block, Akiyama went 4–3 in the Champion Carnival, with a loss on the final block night to Noah representative Naomichi Marufuji costing him the chance to advance to the finals. On July 15, Akiyama's 490-day reign as Gaora TV Champion came to an end in a technical bout against Tajiri who cheated to win. On July 29, he and Nagata lost the All Asia Tag Team Championship to Nomura and a healed Aoyagi. In February 2021, he let his contract with All Japan expire.

=== DDT Pro-Wrestling (2020–present) ===
In June 2020, it was announced that Akiyama would transfer to DDT Pro-Wrestling (DDT) for the remainder of the year. On December 27, he won the D-Oh Grand Prix 2021, thus earning a title match for the KO-D Openweight Championship.

In February 2021 it was announced that Akiyama had let his contract with AJPW expire and was a free agent. He then won the KO-D Openweight Championship at Kawasaki Strong 2021 from Tetsuya Endo. On February 15, 2021, it was announced that he had signed a one-year contract with DDT. On December 7, DDT announced that, at the request of Akiyama and Tetsuya Endo, Kenta Kobashi had endorsed the reformation of Burning for its fourth incarnation. Akiyama and Endo were immediately joined by Yusuke Okada and Yuya Koroku. On December 26, at Never Mind 2021 in Yoyogi, this new stable debuted by defeating The37Kamiina (Shunma Katsumata, Yuki Ueno, Mao and Toui Kojima). On December 4, Akiyama defeated Joey Janela in a Tables, ladders, and chairs match to win the DDT Extreme Championship.

=== All Elite Wrestling (2022; 2024) ===
Through a working relationship between DDT and American professional wrestling company All Elite Wrestling, Akiyama made his AEW debut, on the November 18, 2022 episode of Rampage, teaming with fellow DDT wrestler Konosuke Takeshita, to defeat the team of Ortiz and Eddie Kingston. After the match, Kingston demanded a singles match between himself and Akiyama, which AEW President Tony Khan scheduled for the Zero Hour of Full Gear. On November 19 at the event, Kingston defeated Akiyama, as the two bowed and embraced, showing their respect for one another after the match. Akiyama made his return to AEW on the February 24, 2024 episode of Collision, where he was defeated by Bryan Danielson. After the match, Danielson attacked Akiyama but was thwarted by Kingston who was doing commentary for the match.

== Championships and accomplishments ==
- All Japan Pro Wrestling
  - All Asia Tag Team Championship (4 times) – with Takao Omori (1), Yoshinobu Kanemaru (1), Yuji Nagata (1) and Kotaro Suzuki (1)
  - Gaora TV Championship (1 time)
  - Triple Crown Heavyweight Championship (2 times)
  - World Tag Team Championship (7 times) – with Kenta Kobashi (2), Mitsuharu Misawa (1), Go Shiozaki (1), and Takao Omori (3)
  - All Japan vs. Ehime Pro 1 Day Six Man Tag Tournament (2019) - with Carbell Ito and Rising Hayato
  - Asunaro Cup (1994)
  - Asunaro Tag Cup (1998) – with Takao Omori
  - Champion Carnival (2013)
  - Ōdō Tournament (2015)
  - One Night Six Man Tag Team Tournament (1999) – with Kenta Kobashi and Kentaro Shiga
  - World's Strongest Tag Determination League (1998, 1999) – with Kenta Kobashi
  - World's Strongest Tag Determination League (2014) – with Takao Omori
  - Zen Nihon Award (2014)
- DDT Pro-Wrestling
  - KO-D Openweight Championship (1 time)
  - DDT Extreme Championship (1 time)
  - Ironman Heavymetalweight Championship (4 times)
  - KO-D 6-Man Tag Team Championship (1 time) – with Danshoku Dino and Makoto Oishi
  - D-Oh Grand Prix (2021)
- New Japan Pro-Wrestling
  - Singles Best Bout (2003) vs. Hiroyoshi Tenzan on August 17
  - Tag Team Best Bout (2001) with Yuji Nagata vs. Hiroshi Hase and Keiji Mutoh on October 8
- Nikkan Sports
  - Match of the Year (2001) with Yuji Nagata vs. Keiji Mutoh and Hiroshi Hase on October 8
  - Match of the Year (2004) vs. Kenta Kobashi on July 10
  - Match of the Year (2007) with Mitsuharu Misawa vs. Kenta Kobashi and Yoshihiro Takayama on December 2
  - Match of the Year (2011) vs. Suwama on October 23
  - Outstanding Performance Award (2000, 2001)
  - Fighting Spirit Award (1998)
- Pro Wrestling Illustrated
  - Ranked No. 6 of the 500 best singles wrestlers in the PWI 500 in 2012
  - PWI ranked him #90 of the 500 best singles wrestlers during the "PWI Years" in 2003
- Pro Wrestling Noah
  - GHC Heavyweight Championship (3 times)
  - GHC Tag Team Championship (3 times) – with Akitoshi Saito (2), and Takeshi Rikio (1)
  - GHC Openweight Hardcore Championship (1 time)
  - Global Tag League (2011) – with Akitoshi Saito
- Tokyo Sports
  - Best Tag Team Award (1999) with Kenta Kobashi
  - Fighting Spirit Award (1998)
  - Match of the Year Award (2004) vs. Kenta Kobashi on July 10
  - Newcomer of the Year Award (1992)
  - Outstanding Performance Award (2000, 2001, 2011)
  - Technique Award (2003)
- Wrestling Observer Newsletter
  - Wrestling Observer Hall of Fame (class of 2020)
  - Match of the Year (1996) – with Mitsuharu Misawa vs Steve Williams and Johnny Ace @ AJPW Super Power Series - Tag 15
  - Match of the Year (2004) vs. Kenta Kobashi @ Noah Departure
  - Rookie of the Year (1993)
  - Tag Team of the Year (1996, 1997) with Mitsuharu Misawa
  - Tag Team of the Year (1999) with Kenta Kobashi
