= World's Strongest Tag Determination League =

Annual professional wrestling tournament

The World's Strongest Tag Determination League (世界最強タッグ決定リーグ戦, Sekai Saikyō Taggu Kettei Rīgu-sen), more commonly known in the West as the Real World Tag League, is an annual professional wrestling tournament held by All Japan Pro Wrestling since 1977, usually, run on the first weeks of December. The first tournament was actually called the Open Tag League, but it was renamed to its present name the following year.

The tournament is held under round-robin rules, with 2 points for a win, 1 for a draw, and 0 for a loss; in earlier tournaments, only a time limit draw would provide the one point, with other methods (such as a Double Disqualification and Double Countouts) providing nothing for either team.

The name "Real World Tag League" was a mistranslation by AJPW promoter Giant Baba; "saikyō" in Japanese means "strongest," not "real", but Baba used Engrish for promotional material.

Between 1988 and 1994, the World Tag Team Championship was annually vacated in time for the tournament, which would be used to determine the new champions. The rule was reinstated for the 2012 tournament, but was again ignored the following year, but was reinstated in 2014. In 2000 and 2015 the vacancy was determined by separate post-tournament playoffs between the 2nd and 3rd places.

Ten-Koji (Hiroyoshi Tenzan and Satoshi Kojima) are the only team to win both the World's Strongest Tag Determination League and its counterpart in New Japan Pro-Wrestling, the World Tag League, as well as the only team to win both tournaments in the same year (2008).

== Results ==
=== List of winners ===
Year	Winners	
1977	Dory Funk Jr.	Terry Funk
1978	Giant Baba	Jumbo Tsuruta
1979	Dory Funk Jr.	Terry Funk
1980	Giant Baba	Jumbo Tsuruta
1981	Bruiser Brody	Jimmy Snuka
1982	Dory Funk Jr.	Terry Funk
1983	Bruiser Brody	Stan Hansen
1984	Genichiro Tenryu	Jumbo Tsuruta
1985	Ted DiBiase	Stan Hansen
1986	Genichiro Tenryu	Jumbo Tsuruta
1987	Yoshiaki Yatsu	Jumbo Tsuruta
1988	Terry Gordy	Stan Hansen
1989	Stan Hansen	Genichiro Tenryu
1990	Steve Williams	Terry Gordy
1991	Steve Williams	Terry Gordy
1992	Toshiaki Kawada	Mitsuharu Misawa
1993	Kenta Kobashi	Mitsuharu Misawa
1994	Kenta Kobashi	Mitsuharu Misawa
1995	Kenta Kobashi	Mitsuharu Misawa
1996	Akira Taue	Toshiaki Kawada
1997	Akira Taue	Toshiaki Kawada
1998	Jun Akiyama	Kenta Kobashi
1999	Jun Akiyama	Kenta Kobashi
2000	Mike Rotundo	Steve Williams
2001	Keiji Muto	Taiyō Kea
2002	Satoshi Kojima	Taiyō Kea
2003	Kaz Hayashi	Satoshi Kojima
2004	Jamal	Taiyō Kea
2005	Bubba Ray	D-Von
2006	Hiroyoshi Tenzan	Satoshi Kojima
2007	Joe Doering	Keiji Muto
2008	Hiroyoshi Tenzan	Satoshi Kojima
2009	Keiji Muto	Masakatsu Funaki
2010	Kenso	Masayuki Kono
2011	Kai	Seiya Sanada
2012	Manabu Soya	Takao Omori
2013	Joe Doering	Suwama
2014	Jun Akiyama	Takao Omori
2015	Kento Miyahara	Suwama
2016	Manabu Soya	Takao Omori
2017	Shuji Ishikawa	Suwama
2018	Dylan James	Joe Doering
2019	Shuji Ishikawa	Suwama
2020	Kento Miyahara	Yuma Aoyagi
2021	Kento Miyahara	Yuma Aoyagi
2022	Kento Miyahara	Takuya Nomura
2023	Katsuhiko Nakajima	Hokuto Omori
2024	Jun Saito	Rei Saito
2025	Ren Ayabe	Talos

=== 1977 ===
The 1977 Tag League, featuring 9 teams, was held from December 2 to December 15.

Final standings
Wrestlers	Score
Dory Funk Jr. and Terry Funk	14
Giant Baba and Jumbo Tsuruta	13
Abdullah the Butcher and The Sheik	12
Rusher Kimura and The Great Kusatsu	8
Kim Duk and Kintarō Ōki	8
Horst Hoffman and Billy Robinson	7
The Destroyer and Texas Red	4
Rocky Hata and Genichiro Tenryu	1
Mighty Inoue and Akihisa Takachiho	1

Results	Abdullah Sheik	Baba Tsuruta	Destroyer Red	Dory Terry	Duk Ōki	Hata Tenryu	Hoffman Robinson	Inoue Takachiho	Kimura Kusatsu
Abdullah Sheik	—N/a	Abdullah; Sheik (11:36)	Abdullah; Sheik (7:27)	Dory; Terry (14:40)	Abdullah; Sheik (6:38)	Abdullah; Sheik (6:18)	Abdullah; Sheik (11:02)	Abdullah; Sheik (10:04)	DCO (7:38)
Baba Tsuruta	Abdullah; Sheik (11:36)	—N/a	Baba; Tsuruta (17:34)	Draw (45:00)	Baba; Tsuruta (9:39)	Baba; Tsuruta (16:37)	Baba; Tsuruta (19:09)	Baba; Tsuruta (12:19)	Baba; Tsuruta (16:20)
Destroyer Red	Abdullah; Sheik (7:27)	Baba; Tsuruta (17:34)	—N/a	Dory; Terry (20:15)	Duk; Ōki (20:38)	Destroyer; Red (18:29)	Hoffman; Robinson (15:54)	Destroyer; Red (14:16)	Kimura; Kusatsu (15:21)
Dory Terry	Dory; Terry (14:40)	Draw (45:00)	Dory; Terry (20:15)	—N/a	Dory; Terry (20:59)	Dory; Terry (17:55)	Draw (45:00)	Dory; Terry (Forf)	Dory; Terry (18:51)
Duk Ōki	Abdullah; Sheik (6:38)	Baba; Tsuruta (9:39)	Duk; Ōki (20:38)	Dory; Terry (20:59)	—N/a	Duk; Ōki (16:06)	Duk; Ōki (13:35)	Duk; Ōki (13:38)	DCO (10:20)
Hata Tenryu	Abdullah; Sheik (6:18)	Baba; Tsuruta (16:37)	Destroyer; Red (18:29)	Dory; Terry (17:55)	Duk; Ōki (16:06)	—N/a	Hoffman; Robinson (25:26)	Draw (45:00)	Kimura; Kusatsu (15:51)
Hoffman Robinson	Abdullah; Sheik (11:02)	Baba; Tsuruta (19:09)	Hoffman; Robinson (15:54)	Draw (45:00)	Duk; Ōki (13:35)	Hoffman; Robinson (25:26)	—N/a	Hoffman; Robinson (17:28)	Kimura; Kusatsu (14:54)
Inoue Takachiho	Abdullah; Sheik (10:04)	Baba; Tsuruta (12:19)	Destroyer; Red (14:16)	Dory; Terry (Forf)	Duk; Ōki (13:38)	Draw (45:00)	Hoffman; Robinson (17:28)	—N/a	Kimura; Kusatsu (11:05)
Kimura Kusatsu	DCO (7:38)	Baba; Tsuruta (16:20)	Kimura; Kusatsu (15:21)	Dory; Terry (18:51)	DCO (10:20)	Kimura; Kusatsu (15:51)	Kimura; Kusatsu (14:54)	Kimura; Kusatsu (11:05)	—N/a

=== 1978 ===
The 1978 Tag League, featuring 6 teams, was held from December 1 to December 15. Abdullah the Butcher used both The Sheik and Tor Kamata as partners.

Final standings
Wrestlers	Score
Giant Baba and Jumbo Tsuruta	7
Dory Funk, Jr. and Terry Funk	6
Abdullah the Butcher and Tor Kamata/The Sheik	4
Nick Bockwinkel and Blackjack Lanza	4
Billy Robinson and Wild Angus	3
Kim Duk and Kintarō Ōki	0

Results	Abdullah Sheik/Kamata	Baba Tsuruta	Bockwinkel Lanza	Dory Terry	Duk Ōki	Robinson Angus
Abdullah Sheik/Kamata	—N/a	DCO (11:08)	DCO (11:25)	Abdullah; Sheik (12:29)	Abdullah; Kamata (08:07)	DCO (19:22)
Baba Tsuruta	DCO (11:08)	—N/a	Baba; Tsuruta (14:35)	Draw (45:00)	Baba; Tsuruta (12:50)	Baba; Tsuruta (13:01)
Bockwinkel Lanza	DCO (11:25)	Baba; Tsuruta (14:35)	—N/a	Dory; Terry (28:08)	Bockwinkel; Lanza (14:59)	Bockwinkel; Lanza (17:07)
Dory Terry	Abdullah; Sheik (12:29)	Draw (45:00)	Dory; Terry (28:08)	—N/a	Dory; Terry (18:12)	Draw (45:00)
Duk Ōki	Abdullah; Kamata (08:07)	Baba; Tsuruta (12:50)	Bockwinkel; Lanza (14:59)	Dory; Terry (18:12)	—N/a	Robinson; Angus (17:14)
Robinson Angus	DCO (19:22)	Baba; Tsuruta (13:01)	Bockwinkel; Lanza (17:07)	Draw (45:00)	Robinson; Angus (17:14)	—N/a

=== 1979 ===
The 1979 Tag League, featuring 7 teams, was held from November 30 to December 13.

Final standings
Wrestlers	Score
Dory Funk, Jr. and Terry Funk	11
Giant Baba and Jumbo Tsuruta	9
Abdullah the Butcher and The Sheik	8
Dos Caras and Mil Máscaras	6
Tor Kamata and Kintarō Ōki	4
The Masked Strangler and Mr. Wrestling	2
Frank Hill and Wahoo McDaniel	0

Results	Abdullah Sheik	Baba Tsuruta	Dory Terry	Caras Máscaras	Hill McDaniel	Kamata Ōki	Strangler Mr. Wrestling
Abdullah Sheik	—N/a	DCO (10:52)	Dory; Terry (17:15)	Abdullah; Sheik (7:55)	Abdullah; Sheik (6:30)	Abdullah; Sheik (Forfeit)	Abdullah; Sheik (5:42)
Baba Tsuruta	DCO (10:52)	—N/a	Draw (45:00)	Baba; Tsuruta (12:43)	Baba; Tsuruta (13:21)	Baba; Tsuruta (12:40)	Baba; Tsuruta (13:52)
Dory Terry	Dory; Terry (17:15)	Draw (45:00)	—N/a	Dory; Terry (18:16)	Dory; Terry (15:05)	Dory; Terry (20:26)	Dory; Terry (16:47)
Caras Máscaras	Abdullah; Sheik (7:55)	Baba; Tsuruta (12:43)	Dory; Terry (18:16)	—N/a	Caras; Máscaras (7:17)	Caras; Máscaras (3:50)	Caras; Máscaras (11:58)
Hill McDaniel	Abdullah; Sheik (6:30)	Baba; Tsuruta (13:21)	Dory; Terry (15:05)	Caras; Máscaras (7:17)	—N/a	Kamata; Ōki (10:59)	Strangler; Mr. Wrestling (9:38)
Kamata Ōki	Abdullah; Sheik (Forfeit)	Baba; Tsuruta (12:40)	Dory; Terry (20:26)	Caras; Máscaras (3:50)	Kamata; Ōki (10:59)	—N/a	Kamata; Ōki (9:18)
Strangler Mr. Wrestling	Abdullah; Sheik (5:42)	Baba; Tsuruta (13:52)	Dory; Terry (16:47)	Caras; Máscaras (11:58)	Strangler; Mr. Wrestling (9:38)	Kamata; Ōki (9:18)	—N/a

=== 1980 ===
The 1980 Tag League, featuring 7 teams, was held from November 28 to December 11.

Final standings
Wrestlers	Score
Giant Baba and Jumbo Tsuruta	9
Dory Funk, Jr. and Terry Funk	8
Abdullah the Butcher and Tor Kamata	8
Nick Bockwinkel and Jim Brunzell	4
Dick Slater and Ricky Steamboat	4
Billy Robinson and Les Thornton	3
The Great Mephisto and The Sheik	0

Results	Abdullah Kamata	Baba Tsuruta	Bockwinkel Brunzell	Dory Terry	Mephisto Sheik	Robinson Thornton	Slater Steamboat
Abdullah Kamata	—N/a	Abdullah; Kamata (16:07)	Abdullah; Kamata (7:03)	DCO (15:58)	DCO (7:45)	Abdullah; Kamata (10:56)	Abdullah; Kamata (9:45)
Baba Tsuruta	Abdullah; Kamata (16:07)	—N/a	Baba; Tsuruta (20:35)	Baba; Tsuruta (43:50)	Baba; Tsuruta (6:55)	Baba; Tsuruta (11:31)	Draw (45:00)
Bockwinkel Brunzell	Abdullah; Kamata (7:03)	Baba; Tsuruta (20:35)	—N/a	Dory; Terry (14:55)	Bockwinkel; Brunzell (4:15)	Draw (45:00)	Draw (45:00)
Dory Terry	DCO (15:58)	Baba; Tsuruta (43:50)	Dory; Terry (14:55)	—N/a	Dory; Terry (11:05)	Dory; Terry (19:30)	Dory; Terry (37:06)
Mephisto Sheik	DCO (7:45)	Baba; Tsuruta (6:55)	Bockwinkel; Brunzell (4:15)	Dory; Terry (11:05)	—N/a	Robinson; Thornton (5:15)	Slater; Steamboat (3:30)
Robinson Thornton	Abdullah; Kamata (10:56)	Baba; Tsuruta (11:31)	Draw (45:00)	Dory; Terry (19:30)	Robinson; Thornton (5:15)	—N/a	DCO (28:50)
Slater Steamboat	Abdullah; Kamata (9:45)	Draw (45:00)	Draw (45:00)	Dory; Terry (37:06)	Slater; Steamboat (3:30)	DCO (28:50)	—N/a

=== 1981 ===
The 1981 Tag League, featuring 9 teams, was held from November 27 to December 13. Winners Bruiser Brody and Jimmy Snuka were the first winners to never win the World Tag Team Championship or its predecessors the International or PWF titles, as Stan Hansen, who had recently jumped from New Japan Pro-Wrestling and helped Brody and Snuka win the final, became Brody's new regular tag team partner beginning the following year.

Final standings
Wrestlers	Score
Bruiser Brody and Jimmy Snuka	12
Giant Baba and Jumbo Tsuruta	11
Dory Funk, Jr. and Terry Funk	11
Tiger Jeet Singh and Umanosuke Ueda	10
Larry Hennig and Harley Race	8
Mark Lewin and The Sheik	4
Karl Krupp and Baron von Raschke	2
The Great Kojika and Motoshi Okuma	2
Ashura Hara and Genichiro Tenryu	2

Results	Baba Tsuruta	Brody Snuka	Dory Terry	Hara Tenryu	Hennig Race	Kojika Okuma	Krupp Raschke	Lewin Sheik	Singh Ueda
Baba Tsuruta	—N/a	DCO (16:51)	Draw (45:00)	Baba; Tsuruta (15:54)	Baba; Tsuruta (12:30)	Baba; Tsuruta (16:42)	Baba; Tsuruta (11:23)	Baba; Tsuruta (3:41)	DCO (9:59)
Brody Snuka	DCO (16:51)	—N/a	Brody; Snuka (21:41)	Brody; Snuka (10:06)	Brody; Snuka (9:10)	Brody; Snuka (6:15)	Brody; Snuka (9:15)	Brody; Snuka (8:31)	DDQ (2:26)
Dory Terry	Draw (45:00)	Brody; Snuka (21:41)	—N/a	Dory; Terry (22:32)	Dory; Terry (21:16)	Dory; Terry (13:46)	Dory; Terry (17:41)	Dory; Terry (12:53)	Singh; Ueda (10:37)
Hara Tenryu	Baba; Tsuruta (15:54)	Brody; Snuka (10:06)	Dory; Terry (22:32)	—N/a	Hennig; Race (8:25)	Kojika; Okuma (22:14)	Hara; Tenryu (14:28)	Lewin; Sheik (3:53)	Singh; Ueda (6:59)
Hennig Race	Baba; Tsuruta (12:30)	Brody; Snuka (9:10)	Dory; Terry (21:16)	Hennig; Race (8:25)	—N/a	Hennig; Race (11:14)	Hennig; Race (10:22)	Hennig; Race (1:54)	Singh; Ueda (7:49)
Kojika Okuma	Baba; Tsuruta (16:42)	Brody; Snuka (6:15)	Dory; Terry (13:46)	Kojika; Okuma (22:14)	Hennig; Race (11:14)	—N/a	Krupp; Raschke (10:26)	Lewin; Sheik (5:21)	Singh; Ueda (7:57)
Krupp Raschke	Baba; Tsuruta (11:23)	Brody; Snuka (9:15)	Dory; Terry (17:41)	Hara; Tenryu (14:28)	Hennig; Race (10:22)	Krupp; Raschke (10:26)	—N/a	DCO (7:01)	Singh; Ueda (6:20)
Lewin Sheik	Baba; Tsuruta (3:41)	Brody; Snuka (8:31)	Dory; Terry (12:53)	Lewin; Sheik (3:53)	Hennig; Race (1:54)	Lewin; Sheik (5:21)	DCO (7:01)	—N/a	DDQ (2:06)
Singh Ueda	DCO (9:59)	DDQ (2:26)	Singh; Ueda (10:37)	Singh; Ueda (6:59)	Singh; Ueda (7:49)	Singh; Ueda (7:57)	Singh; Ueda (6:20)	DDQ (2:06)	—N/a

=== 1982 ===
The 1982 Tag League, featuring 7 teams, was held from November 26 to December 13.

Final standings
Wrestlers	Score
Dory Funk, Jr. and Terry Funk	9
Bruiser Brody and Stan Hansen	8
Giant Baba and Jumbo Tsuruta	8
Harley Race and Dick Slater	7
Ashura Hara and Genichiro Tenryu	5
Ricky Steamboat and Jay Youngblood	3
Super Destroyer and Umanosuke Ueda	0

Results	Baba Tsuruta	Brody Hansen	Dory Terry	Hara Tenryu	Race Slater	Steamboat Youngblood	Destroyer Ueda
Baba Tsuruta	—N/a	Brody; Hansen (12:24)	Baba; Tsuruta (26:57)	Baba; Tsuruta (10:54)	Baba; Tsuruta (17:47)	Baba; Tsuruta (15:13)	DCO (7:13)
Brody Hansen	Brody; Hansen (12:24)	—N/a	Dory; Terry (12:30)	Hara; Tenryu (9:29)	Brody; Hansen (12:58)	Brody; Hansen (10:41)	Brody; Hansen (8:23)
Dory Terry	Baba; Tsuruta (26:57)	Dory; Terry (12:30)	—N/a	Dory; Terry (20:45)	Draw (45:00)	Dory; Terry (18:57)	Dory; Terry (11:38)
Hara Tenryu	Baba; Tsuruta (10:54)	Hara; Tenryu (9:29)	Dory; Terry (20:45)	—N/a	Race; Slater (10:59)	Draw (45:00)	Hara; Tenryu (7:19)
Race Slater	Baba; Tsuruta (17:47)	Brody; Hansen (12:58)	Draw (45:00)	Race; Slater (10:59)	—N/a	Race; Slater (10:49)	Race; Slater (8:14)
Steamboat Youngblood	Baba; Tsuruta (15:13)	Brody; Hansen (10:41)	Dory; Terry (18:57)	Draw (45:00)	Race; Slater (10:49)	—N/a	Steamboat; Youngblood (7:41)
Destroyer Ueda	DCO (7:13)	Brody; Hansen (8:23)	Dory; Terry (11:38)	Hara; Tenryu (7:19)	Race; Slater (8:14)	Steamboat; Youngblood (7:41)	—N/a

=== 1983 ===
The 1983 Tag League, featuring 8 teams, was held from November 25 to December 12.

Final standings
Wrestlers	Score
Bruiser Brody and Stan Hansen	12
Dory Funk, Jr. and Giant Baba	11
Genichiro Tenryu and Jumbo Tsuruta	11
Dos Caras and Mil Máscaras	6
Tiger Jeet Singh and Umanosuke Ueda	6
Ron Fuller and Barry Windham	4
Ashura Hara and Mighty Inoue	2
The Mongolian and Goro Tsurumi	0

Results	Brody Hansen	Caras Máscaras	Fuller Windham	Funk Baba	Hara Inoue	Mongolian Tsurumi	Singh Ueda	Tenryu Tsuruta
Brody Hansen	—N/a	Brody; Hansen (9:49)	Brody; Hansen (9:02)	Funk; Baba (6:25)	Brody; Hansen (3:18)	Brody; Hansen (7:46)	Brody; Hansen (9:05)	Brody; Hansen (17:45)
Caras Máscaras	Brody; Hansen (9:49)	—N/a	Caras; Máscaras (8:51)	Funk; Baba (18:40)	Caras; Máscaras (11:45)	Caras; Máscaras (10:06)	No; Contest (2:19)	Tenryu; Tsuruta (18:22)
Fuller Windham	Brody; Hansen (9:02)	Caras; Máscaras (8:51)	—N/a	Funk; Baba (13:13)	Fuller; Windham (13:16)	Fuller; Windham (11:19)	Singh; Ueda (6:20)	Tenryu; Tsuruta (7:48)
Funk Baba	Funk; Baba (6:25)	Funk; Baba (18:40)	Funk; Baba (13:13)	—N/a	Funk; Baba (15:54)	Funk; Baba (11:37)	DCO (17:10)	Draw (45:00)
Hara Inoue	Brody; Hansen (3:18)	Caras; Máscaras (11:45)	Fuller; Windham (13:16)	Funk; Baba (15:54)	—N/a	Inoue; Hara (11:00)	Singh; Ueda (6:07)	Tenryu; Tsuruta (18:30)
Mongolian Tsurumi	Brody; Hansen (7:46)	Caras; Máscaras (10:06)	Fuller; Windham (11:19)	Funk; Baba (11:37)	Inoue; Hara (11:00)	—N/a	Singh; Ueda (Forfeit)	Tenryu; Tsuruta (15:04)
Singh Ueda	Brody; Hansen (9:05)	No; Contest (2:19)	Singh; Ueda (6:20)	DCO (17:10)	Singh; Ueda (6:07)	Singh; Ueda (Forfeit)	—N/a	Tenryu; Tsuruta (14:07)
Tenryu Tsuruta	Brody; Hansen (17:45)	Tenryu; Tsuruta (18:22)	Tenryu; Tsuruta (7:48)	Draw (45:00)	Tenryu; Tsuruta (18:30)	Tenryu; Tsuruta (15:04)	Tenryu; Tsuruta (14:07)	—N/a

=== 1984 ===
The 1984 Tag League, featuring 8 teams, was held from November 22 to December 12.

Final standings
Wrestlers	Score
Genichiro Tenryu and Jumbo Tsuruta	11
Bruiser Brody and Stan Hansen	10
Dory Funk, Jr. and Terry Funk	10
Nick Bockwinkel and Harley Race	10
Dynamite Kid and Davey Boy Smith	7
Giant Baba and Rusher Kimura	2
One Man Gang and Goro Tsurumi	2
Mike Shaw and Tiger Jeet Singh	0

Results	Baba Kimura	Bockwinkel Race	Brody Hansen	Dory Terry	Gang Tsurumi	Kid Smith	Shaw Singh	Tenryu Tsuruta
Baba Kimura	—N/a	Bockwinkel; Race (10:28)	Brody; Hansen (10:40)	Dory; Terry (14:33)	Baba; Kimura (10:36)	Kid; Smith (Forfeit)	Double; Forfeit	Tenryu; Tsuruta (8:25)
Bockwinkel Race	Bockwinkel; Race (10:28)	—N/a	DCO (10:16)	Draw (30:00)	Bockwinkel; Race (11:32)	Bockwinkel; Race (14:26)	Bockwinkel; Race (7:11)	Draw (30:00)
Brody Hansen	Brody; Hansen (10:40)	DCO (10:16)	—N/a	Brody; Hansen (18:42)	Brody; Hansen (7:14)	Brody; Hansen (11:45)	Brody; Hansen (6:31)	Tenryu; Tsuruta (18:47)
Dory Terry	Dory; Terry (14:33)	Draw (30:00)	Brody; Hansen (18:42)	—N/a	Dory; Terry (13:03)	Dory; Terry (23:33)	Dory; Terry (8:58)	Draw (30:00)
Gang Tsurumi	Baba; Kimura (10:36)	Bockwinkel; Race (11:32)	Brody; Hansen (7:14)	Dory; Terry (13:03)	—N/a	Kid; Smith (10:18)	Gang; Tsurumi (Forfeit)	Tenryu; Tsuruta (14:39)
Kid Smith	Kid; Smith (Forfeit)	Bockwinkel; Race (14:26)	Brody; Hansen (11:45)	Dory; Terry (23:33)	Kid; Smith (10:18)	—N/a	Kid; Smith (Forfeit)	Draw (30:00)
Shaw Singh	Double; Forfeit	Bockwinkel; Race (7:11)	Brody; Hansen (6:31)	Dory; Terry (8:58)	Gang; Tsurumi (Forfeit)	Kid; Smith (Forfeit)	—N/a	Tenryu; Tsuruta (13:46)
Tenryu Tsuruta	Tenryu; Tsuruta (8:25)	Draw (30:00)	Tenryu; Tsuruta (18:47)	Draw (30:00)	Tenryu; Tsuruta (14:39)	Draw (30:00)	Tenryu; Tsuruta (13:46)	—N/a

=== 1985 ===
The 1985 Tag League, featuring 8 teams, was held from November 23 to December 12.

Final standings
Wrestlers	Score
Ted DiBiase and Stan Hansen	7
Genichiro Tenryu and Jumbo Tsuruta	6
Jesse Barr and Harley Race	6
Giant Baba and Dory Funk, Jr.	6
Riki Choshu and Yoshiaki Yatsu	6
Dynamite Kid and Davey Boy Smith	5
Nick Bockwinkel and Curt Hennig	5
Ashura Hara and Rusher Kimura	5

Results	Barr Race	Baba Funk	Bockwinkel Hennig	Choshu Yatsu	DiBiase Hansen	Dynamite Smith	Hara Kimura	Tenryu Tsuruta
Barr Race	—N/a	Draw (30:00)	Barr; Race (11:32)	Barr; Race (14:32)	DiBiase; Hansen (7:14)	DCO (7:57)	Draw (30:00)	Tenryu; Tsuruta (13:03)
Baba Funk	Draw (30:00)	—N/a	Baba; Funk (13:08)	Draw (30:00)	DCO (13:04)	DCO (11:53)	Draw (30:00)	Draw (30:00)
Bockwinkel Hennig	Barr; Race (11:32)	Baba; Funk (13:08)	—N/a	Draw (30:00)	Bockwinkel; Hennig (8:36)	Dynamite; Smith (10:46)	Bockwinkel; Hennig (9:46)	Tenryu; Tsuruta (14:38)
Choshu Yatsu	Barr; Race (14:32)	Draw (30:00)	Draw (30:00)	—N/a	Draw (30:00)	Dynamite; Smith (10:44)	Choshu; Yatsu (10:47)	Draw (30:00)
DiBiase Hansen	DiBiase; Hansen (7:14)	DCO (13:04)	Bockwinkel; Hennig (8:36)	Draw (30:00)	—N/a	DiBiase; Hansen (5:32)	DiBiase; Hansen (8:04)	DCO (13:10)
Dynamite Smith	DCO (7:57)	DCO (11:53)	Dynamite; Smith (10:46)	Dynamite; Smith (10:44)	DiBiase; Hansen (5:32)	—N/a	Draw (30:00)	DCO (16:48)
Hara Kimura	Draw (30:00)	Draw (30:00)	Bockwinkel; Hennig (9:46)	Choshu; Yatsu (10:47)	DiBiase; Hansen (8:04)	Draw (30:00)	—N/a	Hara; Kimura (16:12)
Tenryu Tsuruta	Tenryu; Tsuruta (13:03)	Draw (30:00)	Tenryu; Tsuruta (14:38)	Draw (30:00)	DCO (13:10)	DCO (16:48)	Hara; Kimura (16:12)	—N/a

=== 1986 ===
The 1986 Tag League, featuring 9 teams, was held from November 22 to December 12.

Final standings
Wrestlers	Score
Genichiro Tenryu and Jumbo Tsuruta	10
Ted DiBiase and Stan Hansen	10
Dory Funk, Jr. and Terry Funk	9
Riki Choshu and Yoshiaki Yatsu	9
Terry Gordy and Killer Khan	8
Giant Baba and Tiger Mask II	6
Rick Martel and Tom Zenk	6
Rusher Kimura and Goro Tsurumi	4
Ashura Hara and Super Strong Machine	0

Results	Baba Tiger	Choshu Yatsu	DiBiase Hansen	Dory Terry	Gordy Khan	Hara Machine	Kimura Tsurumi	Martel Zenk	Tenryu Tsuruta
Baba Tiger	—N/a	Choshu; Yatsu (13:28)	DiBiase; Hansen (12:57)	Dory; Terry (16:58)	Baba; Tiger (8:51)	Baba; Tiger (Forfeit)	Baba; Tiger (10:27)	DCO (11:12)	Tenryu; Tsuruta (18:38)
Choshu Yatsu	Choshu; Yatsu (13:28)	—N/a	Choshu; Yatsu (11:02)	DCO (13:05)	Gordy; Khan (11:52)	Choshu; Yatsu (11:03)	Choshu; Yatsu (11:19)	DCO (13:41)	Draw (30:00)
DiBiase Hansen	DiBiase; Hansen (12:57)	Choshu; Yatsu (11:02)	—N/a	DiBiase; Hansen (3:49)	DCO (6:31)	DiBiase; Hansen (7:26)	DiBiase; Hansen (6:47)	DiBiase; Hansen (10:29)	DCO (9:19)
Dory Terry	Dory; Terry (16:58)	DCO (13:05)	DiBiase; Hansen (3:49)	—N/a	Gordy; Khan (17:31)	Dory; Terry (13:09)	Dory; Terry (12:04)	Dory; Terry (13:31)	Draw (30:00)
Gordy Khan	Baba; Tiger (8:51)	Gordy; Khan (11:52)	DCO (6:31)	Gordy; Khan (17:31)	—N/a	Gordy; Khan (Forfeit)	Gordy; Khan (10:21)	Martel; Zenk (12:15)	Tenryu; Tsuruta (11:24)
Hara Machine	Baba; Tiger (Forfeit)	Choshu; Yatsu (11:03)	DiBiase; Hansen (7:26)	Gordy; Khan (17:31)	Gordy; Khan (Forfeit)	—N/a	Kimura; Tsurumi (Forfeit)	Martel; Zenk (Forfeit)	Tenryu; Tsuruta (Forfeit)
Kimura Tsurumi	Baba; Tiger (10:27)	Choshu; Yatsu (11:19)	DiBiase; Hansen (6:47)	Dory; Terry (12:04)	Gordy; Khan (10:21)	Kimura; Tsurumi (Forfeit)	—N/a	Martel; Zenk (10:34)	Kimura; Tsurumi (14:58)
Martel Zenk	DCO (11:12)	DCO (13:41)	DiBiase; Hansen (10:29)	Dory; Terry (13:31)	Martel; Zenk (12:15)	Martel; Zenk (Forfeit)	Martel; Zenk (10:34)	—N/a	Tenryu; Tsuruta (12:55)
Tenryu Tsuruta	Tenryu; Tsuruta (18:38)	Draw (30:00)	DCO (9:19)	Draw (30:00)	Tenryu; Tsuruta (11:24)	Tenryu; Tsuruta (Forfeit)	Kimura; Tsurumi (14:58)	Tenryu; Tsuruta (12:55)	—N/a

Final
1	Genichiro Tenryu and Jumbo Tsuruta	CO
2	Ted DiBiase and Stan Hansen	8:13

=== 1987 ===
The 1987 Tag League, featuring 12 teams, was held from November 21 to December 11.

Final standings
Wrestlers	Score
Jumbo Tsuruta and Yoshiaki Yatsu	15
Dory Funk, Jr. and Terry Funk	14
Ashura Hara and Genichiro Tenryu	14
Terry Gordy and Stan Hansen	14
Bruiser Brody and Jimmy Snuka	14
Abdullah the Butcher and TNT	12
Giant Baba and Hiroshi Wajima	11
Shinichi Nakano and Tiger Mask II	6
The Great Kabuki and John Tenta	6
Rusher Kimura and Goro Tsurumi	2
The Terminator and Tom Zenk	2
Chris Youngblood and Mark Youngblood	2

Results	Abdullah TNT	Baba Wajima	Brody Snuka	Chris Mark	Dory Terry	Gordy Hansen	Hara Tenryu	Kabuki Tenta	Kimura Tsurumi	Nakano Tiger	Terminator Zenk	Tsuruta Yatsu
Abdullah TNT	—N/a	Baba; Wajima (9:34)	Brody; Snuka (11:43)	Abdullah; TNT (5:43)	Abdullah; TNT (9:32)	Gordy; Hansen (7:22)	Hara; Tenryu (7:53)	Abdullah; TNT (8:56)	Abdullah; TNT (4:09)	Abdullah; TNT (6:33)	Abdullah; TNT (6:20)	Tsuruta; Yatsu (8:05)
Baba Wajima	Baba; Wajima (9:34)	—N/a	Brody; Snuka (9:27)	Baba; Wajima (11:54)	DCO (12:52)	DCO (16:56)	Draw (30:00)	Baba; Wajima (13:15)	Baba; Wajima (11:23)	Baba; Wajima (13:26)	Baba; Wajima (8:23)	DCO (20:33)
Brody Snuka	Brody; Snuka (11:43)	Brody; Snuka (9:27)	—N/a	Brody; Snuka (9:33)	Dory; Terry (18:33)	DCO (17:14)	DCO (18:07)	Brody; Snuka (11:21)	Brody; Snuka (7:24)	Brody; Snuka (5:45)	Brody; Snuka (11:25)	Tsuruta; Yatsu (16:51)
Chris Mark	Abdullah; TNT (5:43)	Baba; Wajima (11:54)	Brody; Snuka (9:33)	—N/a	Dory; Terry (15:42)	Gordy; Hansen (10:44)	DiBiase; Hansen (7:26)	Kabuki; Tenta (12:54)	Chris; Mark (9:05)	Nakano; Tiger (11:37)	Terminator; Zenk (12:18)	Tsuruta; Yatsu (9:52)
Dory Terry	Abdullah; TNT (9:32)	DCO (12:52)	Dory; Terry (18:33)	Dory; Terry (15:42)	—N/a	DCO (18:30)	DCO (16:39)	Dory; Terry (7:23)	Dory; Terry (13:31)	Dory; Terry (10:22)	Dory; Terry (13:31)	Dory; Terry (23:08)
Gordy Hansen	Gordy; Hansen (7:22)	DCO (16:56)	DCO (17:14)	Gordy; Hansen (10:44)	DCO (18:30)	—N/a	DCO (28:36)	Gordy; Hansen (10:25)	Gordy; Hansen (10:00)	Gordy; Hansen (11:24)	Gordy; Hansen (8:58)	Gordy; Hansen (19:10)
Hara Tenryu	Hara; Tenryu (7:53)	Draw (30:00)	DCO (18:07)	Gordy; Khan (17:31)	DCO (16:39)	DCO (28:36)	—N/a	Hara; Tenryu (13:13)	Hara; Tenryu (16:37)	Hara; Tenryu (18:38)	Hara; Tenryu (12:05)	Draw (30:00)
Kabuki Tenta	Abdullah; TNT (8:56)	Baba; Wajima (13:15)	Brody; Snuka (11:21)	Kabuki; Tenta (12:54)	Dory; Terry (7:23)	Gordy; Hansen (10:25)	Hara; Tenryu (13:13)	—N/a	Kabuki; Tenta (11:58)	DCO (12:59)	Kabuki; Tenta (9:30)	Tsuruta; Yatsu (11:24)
Kimura Tsurumi	Abdullah; TNT (4:09)	Baba; Wajima (11:23)	Brody; Snuka (7:24)	Chris; Mark (9:05)	Dory; Terry (13:31)	Gordy; Hansen (10:00)	Hara; Tenryu (16:37)	Kabuki; Tenta (11:58)	—N/a	Nakano; Tiger (10:29)	Kimura; Tsurumi (11:14)	Tsuruta; Yatsu (12:15)
Nakano Tiger	Abdullah; TNT (6:33)	Baba; Wajima (13:26)	Brody; Snuka (5:45)	Nakano; Tiger (11:37)	Dory; Terry (10:22)	Gordy; Hansen (11:24)	Hara; Tenryu (18:38)	DCO (12:59)	Nakano; Tiger (14:04)	—N/a	Nakano; Tiger (10:29)	Tsuruta; Yatsu (19:02)
Terminator Zenk	Abdullah; TNT (6:20)	Baba; Wajima (8:23)	Brody; Snuka (11:25)	Terminator; Zenk (12:18)	Dory; Terry (13:31)	Gordy; Hansen (8:58)	Hara; Tenryu (8:39)	Kabuki; Tenta (9:30)	Kimura; Tsurumi (11:14)	Nakano; Tiger (10:29)	—N/a	Tsuruta; Yatsu (9:59)
Tsuruta Yatsu	Tsuruta; Yatsu (8:05)	DCO (20:33)	Tsuruta; Yatsu (16:51)	Tsuruta; Yatsu (9:52)	Dory; Terry (23:08)	Gordy; Hansen (19:10)	Draw (30:00)	Tsuruta; Yatsu (11:24)	Tsuruta; Yatsu (12:15)	Tsuruta; Yatsu (19:02)	Tsuruta; Yatsu (9:59)	—N/a

=== 1988 ===
The 1988 Tag League, featuring 11 teams, was held from November 19 to December 16. It was also to decide the vacant World Tag Team Championship.

Final standings
Wrestlers	Score
Terry Gordy and Stan Hansen	17
Jumbo Tsuruta and Yoshiaki Yatsu	16
Giant Baba and Rusher Kimura	15
Abdullah the Butcher and Tiger Jeet Singh	14
Genichiro Tenryu and Toshiaki Kawada	14
Johnny Ace and Dan Spivey	10
Jimmy Snuka and Tiger Mask II	7
The Great Kabuki and Hiroshi Wajima	7
Shunji Takano and John Tenta	4
Crusher Blackwell and Phil Hickerson	0
Tommy Rich and Dick Slater	0

Results	Abdullah Singh	Ace Spivey	Baba Kimura	Blackwell Hickerson	Gordy Hansen	Kabuki Wajima	Rich Slater	Snuka Tiger	Takano Tenta	Tenryu Kawada	Tsuruta Yatsu
Abdullah Singh	—N/a	Abdullah; Singh (9:29)	DCO (11:54)	Abdullah; Singh (7:29)	DCO (14:47)	Abdullah; Singh (9:41)	Abdullah; Singh (12:30)	Abdullah; Singh (11:57)	Abdullah; Singh (10:13)	Abdullah; Singh (7:31)	Tsuruta; Yatsu (9:30)
Ace Spivey	Abdullah; Singh (9:29)	—N/a	Baba; Kimura (13:03)	Ace; Spivey (15:29)	Gordy; Hansen (11:01)	Ace; Spivey (12:28)	Ace; Spivey (17:33)	Ace; Spivey (13:37)	Ace; Spivey (11:16)	Tenryu; Kawada (13:15)	Tsuruta; Yatsu (13:27)
Baba Kimura	DCO (11:54)	Baba; Kimura (13:03)	—N/a	Baba; Kimura (7:44)	Gordy; Hansen (12:52)	Baba; Kimura (12:53)	Baba; Kimura (9:46)	Baba; Kimura (15:57)	Baba; Kimura (11:58)	Baba; Kimura (22:38)	Draw (30:00)
Blackwell Hickerson	Abdullah; Singh (7:29)	Ace; Spivey (15:29)	Baba; Kimura (7:44)	—N/a	Gordy; Hansen (9:44)	Kabuki; Wajima (11:47)	DCO (13:23)	Snuka; Tiger (12:54)	Takano; Tenta (14:26)	Tenryu; Kawada (12:35)	Tsuruta; Yatsu (6:55)
Gordy Hansen	DCO (14:47)	Gordy; Hansen (11:01)	Gordy; Hansen (12:52)	Gordy; Hansen (9:44)	—N/a	Gordy; Hansen (9:45)	Gordy; Hansen (9:18)	Gordy; Hansen (11:52)	Gordy; Hansen (11:08)	Gordy; Hansen (21:02)	Draw (30:00)
Kabuki Wajima	Abdullah; Singh (9:41)	Ace; Spivey (12:28)	Baba; Kimura (12:53)	Kabuki; Wajima (11:47)	Gordy; Hansen (9:45)	—N/a	Kabuki; Wajima (13:26)	Draw (30:00)	Kabuki; Wajima (13:53)	Tenryu; Kawada (22:07)	Tsuruta; Yatsu (15:41)
Rich Slater	Abdullah; Singh (12:30)	Ace; Spivey (17:33)	Baba; Kimura (9:46)	DCO (13:23)	Gordy; Hansen (9:18)	Kabuki; Wajima (13:26)	—N/a	Snuka; Tiger (12:54)	Takano; Tenta (14:53)	Tenryu; Kawada (16:01)	Tsuruta; Yatsu (13:01)
Snuka Tiger	Abdullah; Singh (11:57)	Ace; Spivey (13:37)	Baba; Kimura (15:57)	Snuka; Tiger (12:54)	Gordy; Hansen (11:52)	Draw (30:00)	Snuka; Tiger (12:54)	—N/a	Snuka; Tiger (12:25)	Tenryu; Kawada (12:47)	Tsuruta; Yatsu (17:42)
Takano Tenta	Abdullah; Singh (10:13)	Ace; Spivey (11:16)	Baba; Kimura (11:58)	Takano; Tenta (14:26)	Gordy; Hansen (11:08)	Kabuki; Wajima (13:53)	Takano; Tenta (14:53)	Snuka; Tiger (12:25)	—N/a	Tenryu; Kawada (17:20)	Tsuruta; Yatsu (14:05)
Tenryu Kawada	Abdullah; Singh (7:31)	Tenryu; Kawada (13:15)	Baba; Kimura (22:38)	Tenryu; Kawada (12:35)	Gordy; Hansen (21:02)	Tenryu; Kawada (22:07)	Tenryu; Kawada (16:01)	Tenryu; Kawada (12:47)	Tenryu; Kawada (17:20)	—N/a	Tenryu; Kawada (21:06)
Tsuruta Yatsu	Tsuruta; Yatsu (9:30)	Tsuruta; Yatsu (13:27)	Draw (30:00)	Tsuruta; Yatsu (6:55)	Draw (30:00)	Tsuruta; Yatsu (15:41)	Tsuruta; Yatsu (13:01)	Tsuruta; Yatsu (17:42)	Tsuruta; Yatsu (14:05)	Tenryu; Kawada (21:06)	—N/a

=== 1989 ===
The 1989 Tag League, featuring 10 teams, was held from November 17 to December 6. It was also to decide the vacant World Tag Team Championship.

Final standings
Wrestlers	Score
Stan Hansen and Genichiro Tenryu	18
Jumbo Tsuruta and Yoshiaki Yatsu	16
Giant Baba and Rusher Kimura	14
Dynamite Kid and Davey Boy Smith	12
Abdullah the Butcher and Tiger Jeet Singh	10
Doug Furnas and Dan Kroffat	7
Terry Gordy and Bill Irwin	6
Samson Fuyuki and Toshiaki Kawada	3
Brian Knobs and Jerry Sags	2
The Great Kabuki and Shunji Takano	2

Results	Abdullah Singh	Baba Kimura	Furnas Kroffat	Fuyuki Kawada	Gordy Irwin	Hansen Tenryu	Kabuki Takano	Kid Smith	Knobs Sags	Tsuruta Yatsu
Abdullah Singh	—N/a	Baba; Kimura (6:31)	Abdullah; Singh (7:07)	Abdullah; Singh (8:01)	Abdullah; Singh (8:39)	Hansen; Tenryu (11:22)	Abdullah; Singh (7:06)	Kid; Smith (8:23)	Abdullah; Singh (9:02)	Tsuruta; Yatsu (6:31)
Baba Kimura	Baba; Kimura (6:31)	—N/a	Baba; Kimura (11:14)	Baba; Kimura (11:31)	Baba; Kimura (10:31)	Hansen; Tenryu (20:22)	Baba; Kimura (17:02)	Baba; Kimura (10:38)	Baba; Kimura (14:36)	Tsuruta; Yatsu (17:10)
Furnas Kroffat	Abdullah; Singh (7:07)	Baba; Kimura (11:14)	—N/a	Draw (30:00)	Furnas; Kroffat (11:38)	Hansen; Tenryu (9:46)	Furnas; Kroffat (14:31)	Kid; Smith (17:50)	Furnas; Kroffat (10:48)	Tsuruta; Yatsu (18:04)
Fuyuki Kawada	Abdullah; Singh (8:01)	Baba; Kimura (11:31)	Draw (30:00)	—N/a	Gordy; Irwin (12:25)	Hansen; Tenryu (17:45)	Kabuki; Takano (17:02)	Kid; Smith (11:54)	Fuyuki; Kawada (11:22)	Tsuruta; Yatsu (13:52)
Gordy Irwin	Abdullah; Singh (8:39)	Baba; Kimura (10:31)	Furnas; Kroffat (11:38)	Gordy; Irwin (12:25)	—N/a	Hansen; Tenryu (13:53)	Gordy; Irwin (17:05)	Kid; Smith (10:08)	Gordy; Irwin (16:24)	Tsuruta; Yatsu (21:51)
Hansen Tenryu	Hansen; Tenryu (11:22)	Hansen; Tenryu (20:22)	Hansen; Tenryu (9:46)	Hansen; Tenryu (17:45)	Hansen; Tenryu (13:53)	—N/a	Hansen; Tenryu (9:48)	Hansen; Tenryu (18:32)	Hansen; Tenryu (7:11)	Hansen; Tenryu (28:57)
Kabuki Takano	Abdullah; Singh (7:06)	Baba; Kimura (17:02)	Furnas; Kroffat (14:31)	Kabuki; Takano (17:02)	Gordy; Irwin (17:05)	Hansen; Tenryu (9:48)	—N/a	Kid; Smith (11:58)	Knobs; Sags (14:37)	Tsuruta; Yatsu (13:07)
Kid Smith	Kid; Smith (8:23)	Baba; Kimura (10:38)	Kid; Smith (17:50)	Kid; Smith (11:54)	Kid; Smith (10:08)	Hansen; Tenryu (18:32)	Kid; Smith (11:58)	—N/a	Kid; Smith (11:53)	Tsuruta; Yatsu (12:48)
Knobs Sags	Abdullah; Singh (9:02)	Baba; Kimura (14:36)	Furnas; Kroffat (10:48)	Fuyuki; Kawada (11:22)	Gordy; Irwin (16:24)	Hansen; Tenryu (7:11)	Knobs; Sags (14:37)	Kid; Smith (11:53)	—N/a	Tsuruta; Yatsu (14:46)
Tsuruta Yatsu	Tsuruta; Yatsu (6:31)	Tsuruta; Yatsu (17:10)	Tsuruta; Yatsu (18:04)	Tsuruta; Yatsu (13:52)	Tsuruta; Yatsu (21:51)	Hansen; Tenryu (28:57)	Tsuruta; Yatsu (13:07)	Tsuruta; Yatsu (12:48)	Tsuruta; Yatsu (14:46)	—N/a

=== 1990 ===
The 1990 Tag League, featuring 13 teams, was held from November 15 to December 7. It was also to decide the vacant World Tag Team Championship.

Final standings
Wrestlers	Score
Terry Gordy and Steve Williams	21
Stan Hansen and Danny Spivey	20
Dory Funk, Jr. and Terry Funk	17
Mitsuharu Misawa and Toshiaki Kawada	17
Jumbo Tsuruta and Akira Taue	17
André the Giant and Giant Baba	14
Abdullah the Butcher and Giant Kimala II	12
Dynamite Kid and Johnny Smith	10
Kenta Kobashi and Johnny Ace	10
Butch Masters and Skywalker Nitron	6
Joel Deaton and Dick Slater	4
Mighty Inoue and Rusher Kimura	4
Doug Furnas and Ricky Santana	2

Results	Abdullah Kimala	André Baba	Deaton Slater	Dory Terry	Furnas Santana	Gordy Williams	Hansen Spivey	Inoue Kimura	Kid Smith	Kobashi Ace	Masters Nitron	Misawa Kawada	Tsuruta Taue
Abdullah Kimala	—N/a	André; Baba (8:08)	Abdullah; Kimala (16:32)	Dory; Terry (13:28)	Abdullah; Kimala (10:31)	Gordy; Williams (15:08)	Hansen; Spivey (7:06)	Abdullah; Kimala (11:23)	Abdullah; Kimala (10:35)	Abdullah; Kimala (12:34)	Abdullah; Kimala (10:44)	Misawa; Kawada (10:47)	Tsuruta; Taue (7:53)
André Baba	André; Baba (8:08)	—N/a	André; Baba (8:29)	DCO (11:41)	Furnas; Santana (Forfeit)	André; Baba (16:39)	Hansen; Spivey (Forfeit)	Inoue; Kimura (Forfeit)	André; Baba (7:11)	Kobashi; Ace (Forfeit)	André; Baba (10:38)	André; Baba (Forfeit)	André; Baba (14:02)
Deaton Slater	Abdullah; Kimala (16:32)	André; Baba (8:29)	—N/a	Dory; Terry (17:41)	Deaton; Slater (14:46)	Gordy; Williams (13:37)	Hansen; Spivey (11:54)	Deaton; Slater (10:00)	Kid; Smith (10:40)	Kobashi; Ace (16:20)	Masters; Nitron (10:33)	Misawa; Kawada (16:45)	Tsuruta; Taue (11:09)
Dory Terry	Dory; Terry (13:28)	DCO (11:41)	Dory; Terry (17:41)	—N/a	Dory; Terry (21:41)	Draw (30:00)	Hansen; Spivey (11:35)	Dory; Terry (12:59)	Dory; Terry (16:25)	Dory; Terry (17:11)	Dory; Terry (11:01)	Draw (30:00)	Draw (30:00)
Furnas Santana	Abdullah; Kimala (10:31)	Furnas; Santana (Forfeit)	Deaton; Slater (14:46)	Dory; Terry (21:41)	—N/a	Gordy; Williams (22:19)	Hansen; Spivey (8:43)	Inoue; Kimura (11:37)	Kid; Smith (12:34)	Kobashi; Ace (15:33)	Masters; Nitron (10:02)	Misawa; Kawada (16:01)	Tsuruta; Taue (13:49)
Gordy Williams	Gordy; Williams (15:08)	André; Baba (16:39)	Gordy; Williams (13:37)	Draw (30:00)	Gordy; Williams (22:19)	—N/a	Gordy; Williams (29:59)	Gordy; Williams (9:45)	Gordy; Williams (11:40)	Gordy; Williams (17:18)	Gordy; Williams (20:38)	Gordy; Williams (19:22)	Gordy; Williams (20:31)
Hansen Spivey	Hansen; Spivey (7:06)	Hansen; Spivey (Forfeit)	Hansen; Spivey (11:54)	Hansen; Spivey (11:35)	Hansen; Spivey (8:43)	Gordy; Williams (29:59)	—N/a	Hansen; Spivey (4:44)	Hansen; Spivey (1:45)	Hansen; Spivey (14:42)	Hansen; Spivey (5:42)	Hansen; Spivey (12:32)	Tsuruta; Taue (16:09)
Inoue Kimura	Abdullah; Kimala (11:23)	Inoue; Kimura (Forfeit)	Deaton; Slater (10:00)	Dory; Terry (12:59)	Inoue; Kimura (11:37)	Gordy; Williams (9:45)	Hansen; Spivey (4:44)	—N/a	Kid; Smith (5:30)	Kobashi; Ace (10:25)	Masters; Nitron (7:11)	Misawa; Kawada (12:38)	Tsuruta; Taue (13:29)
Kid Smith	Abdullah; Kimala (10:35)	André; Baba (7:11)	Kid; Smith (10:40)	Dory; Terry (16:25)	Kid; Smith (12:34)	Gordy; Williams (11:40)	Hansen; Spivey (1:45)	Kid; Smith (5:30)	—N/a	Kid; Smith (Forfeit)	Kid; Smith (9:14)	Misawa; Kawada (13:39)	Tsuruta; Taue (12:11)
Kobashi Ace	Abdullah; Kimala (12:34)	Kobashi; Ace (Forfeit)	Kobashi; Ace (16:20)	Dory; Terry (17:11)	Kobashi; Ace (15:33)	Gordy; Williams (17:18)	Hansen; Spivey (14:42)	Kobashi; Ace (10:25)	Kid; Smith (Forfeit)	—N/a	Kobashi; Ace (10:42)	Misawa; Kawada (19:58)	Tsuruta; Taue (18:42)
Masters Nitron	Abdullah; Kimala (10:44)	André; Baba (10:38)	Masters; Nitron (10:33)	Dory; Terry (11:01)	Masters; Nitron (10:02)	Gordy; Williams (20:38)	Hansen; Spivey (5:42)	Masters; Nitron (7:11)	Kid; Smith (9:14)	Kobashi; Ace (10:42)	—N/a	Misawa; Kawada (9:58)	Tsuruta; Taue (7:21)
Misawa Kawada	Misawa; Kawada (10:47)	André; Baba (Forfeit)	Misawa; Kawada (16:45)	Draw (30:00)	Misawa; Kawada (16:01)	Gordy; Williams (19:22)	Hansen; Spivey (12:32)	Misawa; Kawada (12:38)	Misawa; Kawada (13:39)	Misawa; Kawada (19:58)	Misawa; Kawada (9:58)	—N/a	Misawa; Kawada (22:54)
Tsuruta Taue	Tsuruta; Taue (7:53)	André; Baba (14:02)	Tsuruta; Taue (11:09)	Draw (30:00)	Tsuruta; Taue (13:49)	Gordy; Williams (20:31)	Tsuruta; Taue (16:09)	Tsuruta; Taue (13:29)	Tsuruta; Taue (12:11)	Tsuruta; Taue (18:42)	Tsuruta; Taue (7:21)	Misawa; Kawada (22:54)	—N/a

=== 1991 ===
The 1991 Tag League, featuring 13 teams, was held from November 16 to December 6. It was also to decide the vacant World Tag Team Championship.

Final standings
Wrestlers	Score
Terry Gordy and Steve Williams	21
Stan Hansen and Danny Spivey	20
André the Giant and Giant Baba	20
Jumbo Tsuruta and Akira Taue	20
Mitsuharu Misawa and Toshiaki Kawada	19
Abdullah the Butcher and Giant Kimala II	14
Billy Black and Joel Deaton	8
Dory Funk, Jr. and Al Perez	8
Doug Furnas and Dan Kroffat	8
Dynamite Kid and Johnny Smith	6
Johnny Ace and Sonny Beach	4
Mighty Inoue and Rusher Kimura	4
Kenta Kobashi and Tsuyoshi Kikuchi	4

Results	Abdullah Kimala	Ace Beach	André Baba	Black Deaton	Funk Perez	Furnas Kroffat	Gordy Williams	Hansen Spivey	Inoue Kimura	Kid Smith	Kobashi Kikuchi	Misawa Kawada	Tsuruta Taue
Abdullah Kimala	—N/a	Abdullah; Kimala (13:05)	André; Baba (10:30)	Abdullah; Kimala (12:40)	Abdullah; Kimala (11:38)	Abdullah; Kimura (11:26)	Gordy; Williams (8:14)	Hansen; Spivey (9:52)	Abdullah; Kimala (8:30)	Abdullah; Kimala (10:16)	Abdullah; Kimala (9:52)	Misawa; Kawada (8:37)	Tsuruta; Taue (10:36)
Ace Beach	Abdullah; Kimala (13:05)	—N/a	André; Baba (8:01)	Black; Deaton (7:09)	Funk; Perez (12:09)	Furnas; Kroffat (12:37)	Gordy; Williams (9:28)	Hansen; Spivey (11:40)	Ace; Beach (10:50)	Kid; Smith (5:51)	Ace; Beach (17:08)	Misawa; Kawada (15:37)	Tsuruta; Taue (12:07)
André Baba	André; Baba (10:30)	André; Baba (8:01)	—N/a	André; Baba (8:58)	André; Baba (10:52)	André; Baba (9:39)	Gordy; Williams (10:13)	Hansen; Spivey (11:11)	André; Baba (9:10)	André; Baba (6:34)	André; Baba (13:16)	André; Baba (13:05)	André; Baba (10:33)
Black Deaton	Abdullah; Kimala (12:40)	Black; Deaton (7:09)	André; Baba (8:58)	—N/a	Black; Deaton (16:00)	Black; Deaton (13:36)	Gordy; Williams (8:01)	Hansen; Spivey (10:59)	Inoue; Kimura (11:45)	Black; Deaton (12:29)	Kobashi; Kikuchi (14:13)	Misawa; Kawada (17:26)	Tsuruta; Taue (16:21)
Funk Perez	Abdullah; Kimala (11:38)	Funk; Perez (12:09)	André; Baba (10:52)	Black; Deaton (16:00)	—N/a	Funk; Perez (10:20)	Gordy; Williams (14:42)	Hansen; Spivey (8:18)	Funk; Perez (11:07)	Kid; Smith (15:02)	Funk; Perez (13:07)	Misawa; Kawada (17:43)	Tsuruta; Taue (11:38)
Furnas Kroffat	Abdullah; Kimura (11:26)	Furnas; Kroffat (12:37)	André; Baba (9:39)	Black; Deaton (13:36)	Funk; Perez (10:20)	—N/a	Gordy; Williams (12:31)	Hansen; Spivey (8:02)	Furnas; Kroffat (11:35)	Furnas; Kroffat (13:46)	Furnas; Kroffat (20:06)	Misawa; Kawada (15:21)	Tsuruta; Taue (15:21)
Gordy Williams	Gordy; Williams (8:14)	Gordy; Williams (9:28)	Gordy; Williams (10:13)	Gordy; Williams (8:01)	Gordy; Williams (14:42)	Gordy; Williams (12:31)	—N/a	Hansen; Spivey (20:40)	Gordy; Williams (15:30)	Gordy; Williams (17:29)	Gordy; Williams (22:50)	Gordy; Williams (25:24)	Draw (30:00)
Hansen Spivey	Hansen; Spivey (9:52)	Hansen; Spivey (11:40)	Hansen; Spivey (11:11)	Hansen; Spivey (10:59)	Hansen; Spivey (8:18)	Hansen; Spivey (8:02)	Hansen; Spivey (20:40)	—N/a	Hansen; Spivey (7:04)	Hansen; Spivey (9:37)	Hansen; Spivey (17:16)	Misawa; Kawada (12:24)	Tsuruta; Taue (12:12)
Inoue Kimura	Abdullah; Kimala (8:30)	Ace; Beach (10:50)	André; Baba (9:10)	Inoue; Kimura (11:45)	Funk; Perez (11:07)	Furnas; Kroffat (11:35)	Gordy; Williams (15:30)	Hansen; Spivey (7:04)	—N/a	Kid; Smith (11:28)	Inoue; Kimura (12:40)	Misawa; Kawada (12:27)	Tsuruta; Taue (11:07)
Kid Smith	Abdullah; Kimala (10:16)	Kid; Smith (5:51)	André; Baba (6:34)	Black; Deaton (12:29)	Kid; Smith (15:02)	Furnas; Kroffat (13:46)	Gordy; Williams (17:29)	Hansen; Spivey (9:37)	Kid; Smith (11:28)	—N/a	Kobashi; Kikuchi (14:10)	Misawa; Kawada (9:12)	Tsuruta; Taue (8:18)
Kobashi Kikuchi	Abdullah; Kimala (9:52)	Ace; Beach (17:08)	André; Baba (13:16)	Kobashi; Kikuchi (14:13)	Funk; Perez (13:07)	Furnas; Kroffat (20:06)	Gordy; Williams (22:50)	Hansen; Spivey (17:16)	Inoue; Kimura (12:40)	Kobashi; Kikuchi (14:10)	—N/a	Misawa; Kawada (18:51)	Tsuruta; Taue (18:37)
Misawa Kawada	Misawa; Kawada (8:37)	Misawa; Kawada (15:37)	André; Baba (13:05)	Misawa; Kawada (17:26)	Misawa; Kawada (17:43)	Misawa; Kawada (15:21)	Gordy; Williams (25:24)	Misawa; Kawada (12:24)	Misawa; Kawada (12:27)	Misawa; Kawada (9:12)	Misawa; Kawada (18:51)	—N/a	Draw (30:00)
Tsuruta Taue	Tsuruta; Taue (10:36)	Tsuruta; Taue (12:07)	André; Baba (10:33)	Tsuruta; Taue (16:21)	Tsuruta; Taue (11:38)	Tsuruta; Taue (15:21)	Draw (30:00)	Tsuruta; Taue (12:12)	Tsuruta; Taue (11:07)	Tsuruta; Taue (8:18)	Tsuruta; Taue (18:37)	Draw (30:00)	—N/a

=== 1992 ===
The 1992 Tag League, featuring 11 teams, was held from November 14 to December 4. It was also to decide the vacant World Tag Team Championship.

Final standings
Wrestlers	Score
Toshiaki Kawada and Mitsuharu Misawa	18
Terry Gordy and Steve Williams	17
Johnny Ace and Stan Hansen	17
Giant Baba and Kenta Kobashi	16
Jun Akiyama and Akira Taue	12
Doug Furnas and Dan Kroffat	6
Abdullah the Butcher and Giant Kimala II	6
Jackie Fulton and The Patriot	6
Dan Spivey and Kendall Windham	4
Dory Funk, Jr. and Tsuyoshi Kikuchi	4
Billy Black and Joel Deaton	4

=== 1993 ===
The 1993 Tag League, featuring 8 teams, was held from November 13 to December 2. It was also to decide the vacant World Tag Team Championship. Giant Baba replaced Ted DiBiase as Stan Hansen's partner after one match due to injury.

Final standings
Wrestlers	Score
Kenta Kobashi and Mitsuharu Misawa	13
Giant Baba and Stan Hansen	12
Toshiaki Kawada and Akira Taue	11
Big Bubba and Steve Williams	8
Johnny Ace and Dan Spivey	4
Doug Furnas and Dan Kroffat	4
The Eagle and The Patriot	4
Richard Slinger and Tracy Smothers	0

Results	Ace Spivey	Baba Hansen	Bubba Williams	Eagle Patriot	Furnas Kroffat	Kawada Taue	Kobashi Misawa	Slinger Smothers
Ace Spivey	—N/a	Baba; Hansen (8:20)	Bubba; Williams (14:06)	Ace; Spivey (15:18)	Furnas; Kroffat (13:40)	Kawada; Taue (16:06)	Kobashi; Misawa (18:47)	Ace; Spivey (10:59)
Baba Hansen	Baba; Hansen (8:20)	—N/a	Baba; Hansen (13:02)	Baba; Hansen (9:48)	Baba; Hansen (10:19)	Draw (30:00)	Draw (30:00)	Baba; Hansen (5:37)^{1}
Bubba Williams	Bubba; Williams (14:06)	Baba; Hansen (13:02)	—N/a	Bubba; Williams (15:15)	Bubba; Williams (9:06)	Kawada; Taue (22:42)	Kobashi; Misawa (19:55)	Bubba; Williams (12:05)
Eagle Patriot	Ace; Spivey (15:18)	Baba; Hansen (9:48)	Bubba; Williams (15:15)	—N/a	Eagle; Patriot (14:37)	Kawada; Taue (14:18)	Kobashi; Misawa (14:54)	Eagle; Patriot (13:19)
Furnas Kroffat	Furnas; Kroffat (13:40)	Baba; Hansen (10:19)	Bubba; Williams (9:06)	Eagle; Patriot (14:37)	—N/a	Kawada; Taue (14:26)	Kobashi; Misawa (17:36)	Furnas; Kroffat (14:31)
Kawada Taue	Kawada; Taue (16:06)	Draw (30:00)	Kawada; Taue (22:42)	Kawada; Taue (14:18)	Kawada; Taue (14:26)	—N/a	Kobashi; Misawa (23:34)	Kawada; Taue (10:54)
Kobashi Misawa	Kobashi; Misawa (18:47)	Draw (30:00)	Kobashi; Misawa (19:55)	Kobashi; Misawa (14:54)	Kobashi; Misawa (17:36)	Kobashi; Misawa (23:34)	—N/a	Kobashi; Misawa (12:21)
Slinger Smothers	Ace; Spivey (10:59)	Baba; Hansen (5:37)^{1}	Bubba; Williams (12:05)	Eagle; Patriot (13:19)	Furnas; Kroffat (14:31)	Kawada; Taue (10:54)	Kobashi; Misawa (12:21)	—N/a

^{1}Hansen and Ted DiBiase originally defeated Slinger and Smothers in 7:11; however, when Baba replaced DiBiase, the teams wrestled a rematch.

=== 1994 ===
The 1994 Tag League, featuring 10 teams, was held from November 19 to December 10. It was also to decide the vacant World Tag Team Championship.

Final standings
Wrestlers	Score
Kenta Kobashi and Mitsuharu Misawa	16
Giant Baba and Stan Hansen	15
Toshiaki Kawada and Akira Taue	15
Johnny Ace and Steve Williams	14
Doug Furnas and Dan Kroffat	10
Jun Akiyama and Takao Omori	8
Abdullah the Butcher and Giant Kimala	6
Dory Funk, Jr. and Johnny Smith	2
The Eagle and The Falcon	2
Dan Spivey and Jim Steele	2

Results	Kobashi Misawa	Baba Hansen	Kawada Taue	Ace Williams	Furnas Kroffat	Akiyama Omori	Abdullah Kimala	Funk Smith	Eagle Falcon	Spivey Steele
Kobashi Misawa	—N/a	Draw (30:00)	Draw (30:00)	Kobashi; Misawa (25:05)	Kobashi; Misawa (21:43)	Kobashi; Misawa (16:11)	Kobashi; Misawa (13:41)	Kobashi; Misawa (21:10)	Kobashi; Misawa (12:47)	Kobashi; Misawa (14:39)
Baba Hansen	Draw (30:00)	—N/a	Baba; Hansen (26:30)	Ace; Williams (17:04)	Baba; Hansen (9:46)	Baba; Hansen (22:32)	Baba; Hansen (10:23)	Baba; Hansen (17:58)	Baba; Hansen (3:51)	Baba; Hansen (8:27)
Kawada Taue	Draw (30:00)	Baba; Hansen (26:30)	—N/a	Kawada; Taue (27:03)	Kawada; Taue (15:03)	Kawada; Taue (18:30)	Kawada; Taue (9:50)	Kawada; Taue (17:00)	Kawada; Taue (11:10)	Kawada; Taue (12:00)
Ace Williams	Kobashi; Misawa (25:05)	Ace; Williams (17:04)	Kawada; Taue (27:03)	—N/a	Ace; Williams (17:00)	Ace; Williams (14:44)	Ace; Williams (9:57)	Ace; Williams (15:20)	Ace; Williams (14:43)	Ace; Williams (11:44)
Furnas Kroffat	Kobashi; Misawa (21:43)	Baba; Hansen (9:46)	Kawada; Taue (15:03)	Ace; Williams (17:00)	—N/a	Furnas; Kroffat (15:49)	Furnas; Kroffat (11:44)	Furnas; Kroffat (17:57)	Furnas; Kroffat (15:49)	Furnas; Kroffat (13:49)
Akiyama Omori	Kobashi; Misawa (16:11)	Baba; Hansen (22:32)	Kawada; Taue (18:30)	Ace; Williams (14:44)	Furnas; Kroffat (15:49)	—N/a	Akiyama; Omori (9:35)	Akiyama; Omori (17:40)	Akiyama; Omori (16:58)	Akiyama; Omori (14:45)
Abdullah Kimala	Kobashi; Misawa (13:41)	Baba; Hansen (10:23)	Kawada; Taue (9:50)	Ace; Williams (9:57)	Furnas; Kroffat (11:44)	Akiyama; Omori (9:35)	—N/a	Abdullah; Kimala (9:33)	Abdullah; Kimala (12:27)	Abdullah; Kimala (9:44)
Funk Smith	Kobashi; Misawa (21:10)	Baba; Hansen (17:58)	Kawada; Taue (17:00)	Ace; Williams (15:20)	Furnas; Kroffat (17:57)	Akiyama; Omori (17:40)	Abdullah; Kimala (9:33)	—N/a	Eagle; Falcon (13:37)	Funk; Smith (18:52)
Eagle Falcon	Kobashi; Misawa (12:47)	Baba; Hansen (3:51)	Kawada; Taue (11:10)	Ace; Williams (14:43)	Furnas; Kroffat (15:49)	Akiyama; Omori (16:58)	Abdullah; Kimala (12:27)	Eagle; Falcon (13:37)	—N/a	Spivey; Steele (16:06)
Spivey Steele	Kobashi; Misawa (14:39)	Baba; Hansen (8:27)	Kawada; Taue (12:00)	Ace; Williams (11:44)	Furnas; Kroffat (13:49)	Akiyama; Omori (14:45)	Abdullah; Kimala (9:44)	Funk; Smith (18:52)	Spivey; Steele (16:06)	—N/a

=== 1995 ===
The 1995 Tag League, featuring 10 teams, was held from November 18 to December 9.

Final standings
Wrestlers	Score
Toshiaki Kawada and Akira Taue	16
Kenta Kobashi and Mitsuharu Misawa	16
Gary Albright and Stan Hansen	15
Johnny Ace and The Patriot	13
Giant Baba and Tamon Honda	10
Doug Furnas and Dan Kroffat	6
Jun Akiyama and Takao Omori	4
Masanobu Fuchi and Dory Funk, Jr.	4
Abdullah the Butcher and Giant Kimala	4
Johnny Smith and Rob Van Dam	2

Results	Abdullah Kimala	Ace Patriot	Akiyama Omori	Albright Hansen	Baba Honda	Fuchi Funk	Furnas Kroffat	Kawada Taue	Kobashi Misawa	Smith Van Dam
Abdullah Kimala	—N/a	Ace; Patriot (10:46)	Akiyama; Omori (11:44)	Albright; Hansen (8:04)	Baba; Honda (13:48)	Abdullah; Kimala (10:23)	Furnas; Kroffat (11:48)	Kawada; Taue (9:43)	Kobashi; Misawa (16:04)	Abdullah; Kimala (11:33)
Ace Patriot	Ace; Patriot (10:46)	—N/a	Ace; Patriot (14:56)	Albright; Hansen (15:23)	Ace; Patriot (13:06)	Ace; Patriot (17:00)	Ace; Patriot (15:19)	Draw (30:00)	Kobashi; Misawa (24:45)	Ace; Patriot (13:18)
Akiyama Omori	Akiyama; Omori (11:44)	Ace; Patriot (14:56)	—N/a	Albright; Hansen (10:14)	Baba; Honda (18:05)	Fuchi; Funk (24:06)	Akiyama; Omori (13:19)	Kawada; Taue (15:15)	Kobashi; Misawa (20:32)	Smith; Van Dam (16:19)
Albright Hansen	Albright; Hansen (8:04)	Albright; Hansen (15:23)	Albright; Hansen (10:14)	—N/a	Albright; Hansen (13:52)	Albright; Hansen (4:31)	Albright; Hansen (7:25)	Draw (30:00)	Kobashi; Misawa (20:54)	Albright; Hansen (7:03)
Baba Honda	Baba; Honda (13:48)	Ace; Patriot (13:06)	Baba; Honda (18:05)	Albright; Hansen (13:52)	—N/a	Baba; Honda (20:20)	Baba; Honda (13:02)	Kawada; Taue (18:41)	Kobashi; Misawa (20:00)	Baba; Honda (15:22)
Fuchi Funk	Abdullah; Kimala (10:23)	Ace; Patriot (17:00)	Fuchi; Funk (24:06)	Albright; Hansen (4:31)	Baba; Honda (20:20)	—N/a	Furnas; Kroffat (17:18)	Kawada; Taue (19:29)	Kobashi; Misawa (23:26)	Fuchi; Funk (19:52)
Furnas Kroffat	Furnas; Kroffat (11:48)	Ace; Patriot (15:19)	Akiyama; Omori (13:19)	Albright; Hansen (7:25)	Baba; Honda (13:02)	Furnas; Kroffat (17:18)	—N/a	Kawada; Taue (12:59)	Kobashi; Misawa (16:56)	Furnas; Kroffat (15:56)
Kawada Taue	Kawada; Taue (9:43)	Draw (30:00)	Kawada; Taue (15:15)	Draw (30:00)	Kawada; Taue (18:41)	Kawada; Taue (19:29)	Kawada; Taue (12:59)	—N/a	Kawada; Taue (29:01)	Kawada; Taue (12:06)
Kobashi Misawa	Kobashi; Misawa (16:04)	Kobashi; Misawa (24:45)	Kobashi; Misawa (20:32)	Kobashi; Misawa (20:54)	Kobashi; Misawa (20:00)	Kobashi; Misawa (23:26)	Kobashi; Misawa (16:56)	Kawada; Taue (29:01)	—N/a	Kobashi; Misawa (14:58)
Smith Van Dam	Abdullah; Kimala (11:33)	Ace; Patriot (13:18)	Smith; Van Dam (16:19)	Albright; Hansen (7:03)	Baba; Honda (15:22)	Fuchi; Funk (19:52)	Furnas; Kroffat (15:56)	Kawada; Taue (12:06)	Kobashi; Misawa (14:58)	—N/a

Final
1	Toshiaki Kawada and Akira Taue	Pin
2	Kenta Kobashi and Mitsuharu Misawa	27:04

=== 1996 ===
The 1996 Tag League, featuring 7 teams, was held from November 16 to December 6. In an alteration of previous years, each team faced each other twice during the group stage.

Final standings
Wrestlers	Score
Toshiaki Kawada and Akira Taue	17
Jun Akiyama and Mitsuharu Misawa	17
Kenta Kobashi and The Patriot	16
Johnny Ace and Steve Williams	16
Stan Hansen and Takao Omori	6
Giant Kimala and Jun Izumida	6
Gary Albright and Sabu	6

Final
1	Toshiaki Kawada and Akira Taue	Pin
2	Jun Akiyama and Mitsuharu Misawa	31:37

=== 1997 ===
The 1997 Tag League, featuring 10 teams, was held from November 15 to December 5.

Final standings
Wrestlers	Score
Toshiaki Kawada and Akira Taue	15
Jun Akiyama and Mitsuharu Misawa	15
Gary Albright and Steve Williams	14
Johnny Ace and Kenta Kobashi	14
Wolf Hawkfield and Johnny Smith	10
Bobby Duncum, Jr. and Stan Hansen	6
Justin Bradshaw and Barry Windham	4
Hayabusa and Jinsei Shinzaki	4
Giant Kimala and Jun Izumida	4
Tamon Honda and Takao Omori	4

Results	Ace Kobashi	Akiyama Misawa	Albright Williams	Bradshaw Windham	Duncum Hansen	Wolf Smith	Hayabusa Shinzaki	Honda Omori	Izumida Kimala	Kawada Taue
Ace Kobashi	—N/a	Akiyama; Misawa (29:50)	Draw (30:00)	Ace; Kobashi (10:39)	Ace; Kobashi (11:31)	Ace; Kobashi (21:08)	Ace; Kobashi (22:25)	Ace; Kobashi (15:40)	Ace; Kobashi (10:41)	Draw (30:00)
Akiyama Misawa	Akiyama; Misawa (29:50)	—N/a	Akiyama; Misawa (20:41)	Akiyama; Misawa (14:32)	Akiyama; Misawa (13:52)	Draw (30:00)	Akiyama; Misawa (21:34)	Akiyama; Misawa (6:55)	Akiyama; Misawa (17:33)	Kawada; Taue (22:25)
Albright Williams	Draw (30:00)	Akiyama; Misawa (20:41)	—N/a	Albright; Williams (12:35)	Albright; Williams (18:53)	Draw (30:00)	Albright; Williams (16:11)	Albright; Williams (11:48)	Albright; Williams (15:44)	Albright; Williams (10:54)
Bradshaw Windham	Ace; Kobashi (10:39)	Akiyama; Misawa (14:32)	Albright; Williams (12:35)	—N/a	Bradshaw; Windham (14:39)	Wolf; Smith (14:09)	Bradshaw; Windham (15:04)	Honda; Omori (15:43)	Izumida; Kimala (14:27)	Kawada; Taue (11:00)
Duncum Hansen	Ace; Kobashi (11:31)	Akiyama; Misawa (13:52)	Albright; Williams (18:53)	Bradshaw; Windham (14:39)	—N/a	Wolf; Smith (13:53)	Duncum; Hansen (15:24)	Duncum; Hansen (12:41)	Duncum; Hansen (12:32)	Kawada; Taue (10:30)
Wolf Smith	Ace; Kobashi (21:08)	Draw (30:00)	Draw (30:00)	Wolf; Smith (14:09)	Wolf; Smith (13:53)	—N/a	Hayabusa; Shinzaki (20:18)	Wolf; Smith (11:23)	Wolf; Smith (17:13)	Kawada; Taue (12:44)
Hayabusa Shinzaki	Ace; Kobashi (22:25)	Akiyama; Misawa (21:34)	Albright; Williams (16:11)	Bradshaw; Windham (15:04)	Duncum; Hansen (15:24)	Hayabusa; Shinzaki (20:18)	—N/a	Honda; Omori (15:28)	Hayabusa; Shinzaki (11:51)	Kawada; Taue (18:09)
Honda Omori	Ace; Kobashi (15:40)	Akiyama; Misawa (6:55)	Albright; Williams (11:48)	Honda; Omori (15:43)	Duncum; Hansen (12:41)	Wolf; Smith (11:23)	Honda; Omori (15:28)	—N/a	Izumida; Kimala (16:06)	Kawada; Taue (12:45)
Izumida Kimala	Ace; Kobashi (10:41)	Akiyama; Misawa (17:33)	Albright; Williams (15:44)	Izumida; Kimala (14:27)	Duncum; Hansen (12:32)	Wolf; Smith (17:13)	Hayabusa; Shinzaki (11:51)	Izumida; Kimala (16:06)	—N/a	Kawada; Taue (10:02)
Kawada Taue	Draw (30:00)	Kawada; Taue (22:25)	Albright; Williams (10:54)	Kawada; Taue (11:00)	Kawada; Taue (10:30)	Kawada; Taue (12:44)	Kawada; Taue (18:09)	Kawada; Taue (12:45)	Kawada; Taue (10:02)	—N/a

Final
1	Toshiaki Kawada and Akira Taue	Pin
2	Jun Akiyama and Mitsuharu Misawa	30:52

=== 1998 ===
The 1998 Tag League, featuring 8 teams, was held from November 14 to December 5.

Final standings
Wrestlers	Score
Stan Hansen and Vader	14
Jun Akiyama and Kenta Kobashi	11
Toshiaki Kawada and Akira Taue	10
Johnny Ace and Bart Gunn	8
Mitsuharu Misawa and Yoshinari Ogawa	7
Gary Albright and Giant Kimala	2
Headhunter A and Headhunter B	2
Takao Omori and Yoshihiro Takayama	2

Results	Ace Gunn	Akiyama Kobashi	Albright Kimala	Hansen Vader	Headhunter A Headhunter B	Kawada Taue	Misawa Ogawa	Omori Takayama
Ace Gunn	—N/a	Akiyama; Kobashi (20:04)	Ace; Gunn (9:57)	Hansen; Vader (12:33)	Ace; Gunn (12:29)	Kawada; Taue (17:55)	Ace; Gunn (13:49)	Ace; Gunn (15:39)
Akiyama Kobashi	Akiyama; Kobashi (20:04)	—N/a	Akiyama; Kobashi (7:56)	Hansen; Vader (14:49)	Akiyama; Kobashi (11:50)	Akiyama; Kobashi (21:40)	Draw (30:00)	Akiyama; Kobashi (17:59)
Albright Kimala	Ace; Gunn (9:57)	Akiyama; Kobashi (7:56)	—N/a	Hansen; Vader (9:23)	Albright; Kimala (11:51)	Kawada; Taue (10:36)	Misawa; Ogawa (15:16)	Omori; Takayama (12:25)
Hansen Vader	Hansen; Vader (12:33)	Hansen; Vader (14:49)	Hansen; Vader (9:23)	—N/a	Hansen; Vader (3:58)	Hansen; Vader (11:42)	Hansen; Vader (7:10)	Hansen; Vader (8:57)
Headhunter A Headhunter B	Ace; Gunn (12:29)	Akiyama; Kobashi (11:50)	Albright; Kimala (11:51)	Hansen; Vader (3:58)	—N/a	Kawada; Taue (8:38)	Misawa; Ogawa (8:13)	Headhunter A Headhunter B (12:46)
Kawada Taue	Kawada; Taue (17:55)	Akiyama; Kobashi (21:40)	Kawada; Taue (10:36)	Hansen; Vader (11:42)	Kawada; Taue (8:38)	—N/a	Kawada; Taue (14:54)	Kawada; Taue (13:11)
Misawa Ogawa	Ace; Gunn (13:49)	Draw (30:00)	Misawa; Ogawa (15:16)	Hansen; Vader (7:10)	Misawa; Ogawa (8:13)	Kawada; Taue (14:54)	—N/a	Misawa; Ogawa (15:57)
Omori Takayama	Ace; Gunn (15:39)	Akiyama; Kobashi (17:59)	Omori; Takayama (12:25)	Hansen; Vader (8:57)	Headhunter A Headhunter B (12:46)	Kawada; Taue (13:11)	Misawa; Ogawa (15:57)	—N/a

Final
1	Stan Hansen and Vader	Pin
2	Jun Akiyama and Kenta Kobashi	19:03

=== 1999 ===
The 1999 Tag League, featuring 8 teams, was held from November 13 to December 3.

Final standings
Wrestlers	Score
Stan Hansen and Akira Taue	11
Jun Akiyama and Kenta Kobashi	10
Johnny Smith and Vader	9
Johnny Ace and Mike Barton	9
Mitsuharu Misawa and Yoshinari Ogawa	9
Takao Omori and Yoshihiro Takayama	4
Gary Albright and Wolf Hawkfield	2
Tamon Honda and Masao Inoue	2

Results	Ace Barton	Akiyama Kobashi	Albright Wolf	Hansen Taue	Honda Inoue	Misawa Ogawa	Omori Takayama	Smith Vader
Ace Barton	—N/a	Akiyama; Kobashi (17:23)	Ace; Barton (17:40)	Draw (30:00)	Ace; Barton (18:14)	Ace; Barton (18:48)	Ace; Barton (14:04)	Smith; Vader (14:50)
Akiyama Kobashi	Akiyama; Kobashi (17:23)	—N/a	Akiyama; Kobashi (3:49)	Hansen; Taue (18:44)	Akiyama; Kobashi (17:08)	Draw (30:00)	Akiyama; Kobashi (18:25)	Draw (30:00)
Albright Wolf	Ace; Barton (17:40)	Akiyama; Kobashi (3:49)	—N/a	Hansen; Taue (11:44)	Albright; Wolf (17:07)	Misawa; Ogawa (16:09)	Omori; Takayama (13:01)	Smith; Vader (12:16)
Hansen Taue	Draw (30:00)	Hansen; Taue (18:44)	Hansen; Taue (11:44)	—N/a	Hansen; Taue (11:49)	Misawa; Ogawa (16:02)	Hansen; Taue (11:12)	Hansen; Taue (12:34)
Honda Inoue	Ace; Barton (18:14)	Akiyama; Kobashi (17:08)	Albright; Wolf (17:07)	Hansen; Taue (11:49)	—N/a	Misawa; Ogawa (18:32)	Honda; Inoue (18:36)	Smith; Vader (11:32)
Misawa Ogawa	Ace; Barton (18:48)	Draw (30:00)	Misawa; Ogawa (16:09)	Misawa; Ogawa (16:02)	Misawa; Ogawa (18:32)	—N/a	Misawa; Ogawa (17:32)	Smith; Vader (25:22)
Omori Takayama	Ace; Barton (14:04)	Akiyama; Kobashi (18:25)	Omori; Takayama (13:01)	Hansen; Taue (11:12)	Honda; Inoue (18:36)	Misawa; Ogawa (17:32)	—N/a	Omori; Takayama (12:41)
Smith Vader	Smith; Vader (14:50)	Draw (30:00)	Smith; Vader (12:16)	Hansen; Taue (12:34)	Smith; Vader (11:32)	Smith; Vader (25:22)	Omori; Takayama (12:41)	—N/a

Final
1	Stan Hansen and Akira Taue	Pin
2	Jun Akiyama and Kenta Kobashi	20:15

=== 2000 ===
The 2000 Tag League, featuring 8 teams, was held from November 19 to December 9. Due to a four-way tie for first place, the four teams were placed into a semifinals instead of the traditional one-match final.

Final standings
Wrestlers	Score
Taiyō Kea and Johnny Smith	10
Mike Rotundo and Steve Williams	10
Masanobu Fuchi and Toshiaki Kawada	10
Mike Barton and Jim Steele	10
Barry Windham and Kendall Windham	6
Nobutaka Araya and Genichiro Tenryu	6
Yoshiaki Fujiwara and Dan Kroffat	2
Masahito Kakihara and Mitsuya Nagai	2

Results	Araya Tenryu	Barton Steele	Fuchi Kawada	Fujiwara Kroffat	Kakihara Nagai	Kea Smith	Rotundo Williams	Barry Kendall
Araya Tenryu	—N/a	Barton; Steele (15:51)	Fuchi; Kawada (21:08)	Araya; Tenryu (13:38)	Araya; Tenryu (14:00)	Araya; Tenryu (19:36)	Rotundo; Williams (15:26)	Barry; Kendall (9:59)
Barton Steele	Barton; Steele (15:51)	—N/a	Draw (30:00)	Barton; Steele (23:09)	Barton; Steele (11:09)	Draw (30:00)	Rotundo; Williams (17:10)	Barton; Steele (14:40)
Fuchi Kawada	Fuchi; Kawada (21:08)	Draw (30:00)	—N/a	Fuchi; Kawada (17:21)	Fuchi; Kawada (20:18)	Draw (30:00)	Rotundo; Williams (17:37)	Fuchi; Kawada (15:06)
Fujiwara Kroffat	Araya; Tenryu (13:38)	Barton; Steele (23:09)	Fuchi; Kawada (17:21)	—N/a	Fujiwara; Kroffat (12:04)	Kea; Smith (15:25)	Rotundo; Williams (1:07)	Barry; Kendall (9:04)
Kakihara Nagai	Araya; Tenryu (14:00)	Barton; Steele (11:09)	Fuchi; Kawada (20:18)	Fujiwara; Kroffat (12:04)	—N/a	Kea; Smith (14:37)	Rotundo; Williams (15:08)	Kakihara; Nagai (6:43)
Kea Smith	Araya; Tenryu (19:36)	Draw (30:00)	Draw (30:00)	Kea; Smith (15:25)	Kea; Smith (14:37)	—N/a	Kea; Smith (17:40)	Kea; Smith (18:46)
Rotundo Williams	Rotundo; Williams (15:26)	Rotundo; Williams (17:10)	Rotundo; Williams (17:37)	Rotundo; Williams (1:07)	Rotundo; Williams (15:08)	Kea; Smith (17:40)	—N/a	Barry; Kendall (11:56)
Barry Kendall	Barry; Kendall (9:59)	Barton; Steele (14:40)	Fuchi; Kawada (15:06)	Barry; Kendall (9:04)	Kakihara; Nagai (6:43)	Kea; Smith (18:46)	Barry; Kendall (11:56)	—N/a

Semifinals
1	Taiyō Kea and Johnny Smith	Pin
2	Mike Rotundo and Steve Williams	8:20
3	Masanobu Fuchi and Toshiaki Kawada	Sub
4	Mike Barton and Jim Steele	21:08

Finals
2	Mike Rotundo and Steve Williams	Pin
3	Masanobu Fuchi and Toshiaki Kawada	21:27

=== 2001 ===
The 2001 Tag League, featuring 8 teams, was held from November 24 to December 7. As with the previous year, the top four teams faced off in the semifinals as a result of a four-way tie.

Final standings
Wrestlers	Score
Toshiaki Kawada and Mitsuya Nagai	10
Taiyō Kea and Keiji Muto	10
Don Harris and Ron Harris	10
Kodo Fuyuki and Genichiro Tenryu	10
Mike Rotundo and Steve Williams	6
Arashi and Koki Kitahara	4
George Hines and Vampiro	3
Yoji Anjo and Johnny Smith	3

Results	Anjo Smith	Arashi Kitahara	Fuyuki Tenryu	Don Ron	Hines Vampiro	Kawada Nagai	Kea Muto	Rotundo Williams
Anjo Smith	—N/a	Arashi; Kitahara (14:15)	Fuyuki; Tenryu (9:41)	Don; Ron (11:07)	Hines; Vampiro (14:55)	Draw (30:00)	Kea; Muto (18:12)	Anjo; Smith (12:33)
Arashi Kitahara	Arashi; Kitahara (14:15)	—N/a	Fuyuki; Tenryu (14:36)	Don; Ron (8:36)	Arashi; Kitahara (14:08)	Kawada; Nagai (13:59)	Kea; Muto (16:43)	Rotundo; Williams (11:34)
Fuyuki Tenryu	Fuyuki; Tenryu (9:41)	Fuyuki; Tenryu (14:36)	—N/a	Don; Ron (5:19)	Fuyuki; Tenryu (8:33)	Kawada; Nagai (13:55)	Fuyuki; Tenryu (16:54)	Fuyuki; Tenryu (4:49)
Don Ron	Don; Ron (11:07)	Don; Ron (8:36)	Don; Ron (5:19)	—N/a	Don; Ron (10:51)	Kawada; Nagai (13:10)	Kea; Muto (16:31)	Don; Ron (8:05)
Hines Vampiro	Hines; Vampiro (14:55)	Arashi; Kitahara (14:08)	Fuyuki; Tenryu (8:33)	Don; Ron (10:51)	—N/a	Kawada; Nagai (21:24)	Draw (30:00)	Rotundo; Williams (15:57)
Kawada Nagai	Draw (30:00)	Kawada; Nagai (13:59)	Kawada; Nagai (13:55)	Kawada; Nagai (13:10)	Kawada; Nagai (21:24)	—N/a	Draw (30:00)	Rotundo; Williams (18:15)
Kea Muto	Kea; Muto (18:12)	Kea; Muto (16:43)	Fuyuki; Tenryu (16:54)	Kea; Muto (16:31)	Draw (30:00)	Draw (30:00)	—N/a	Kea; Muto (22:22)
Rotundo Williams	Anjo; Smith (12:33)	Rotundo; Williams (11:34)	Fuyuki; Tenryu (4:49)	Don; Ron (8:05)	Rotundo; Williams (15:57)	Rotundo; Williams (18:15)	Kea; Muto (22:22)	—N/a

Semifinals
1	Toshiaki Kawada and Mitsuya Nagai	Sub
3	Don Harris and Ron Harris	7:05
2	Taiyō Kea and Keiji Muto	Pin
4	Kodo Fuyuki and Genichiro Tenryu	14:30

Finals
1	Toshiaki Kawada and Mitsuya Nagai	Pin
2	Taiyō Kea and Keiji Muto	16:49

=== 2002 ===
The 2002 Tag League, featuring 8 teams, was held from November 23 to December 6.

Final standings
Wrestlers	Score
Taiyō Kea and Satoshi Kojima	11
Genichiro Tenryu and Big John Tenta	10
Animal Warrior and Keiji Muto	10
Mike Rotundo and Steve Williams	9
Shinjiro Otani and Masato Tanaka	8
Yoji Anjo and Mitsuya Nagai	4
Mike Awesome and PJ Friedman	2
Arashi and Nobutaka Araya	2

Results	Animal Muto	Anjo Nagai	Arashi Araya	Awesome Friedman	Kea Kojima	Otani Tanaka	Rotundo Williams	Tenryu Tenta
Animal Muto	—N/a	Animal; Muto (10:38)	Animal; Muto (4:12)	Animal; Muto (6:11)	Kea; Kojima (16:54)	Animal; Muto (16:31)	Animal; Muto (10:03)	Tenryu; Tenta (13:31)
Anjo Nagai	Animal; Muto (10:38)	—N/a	Draw (30:00)	Anjo; Nagai (11:31)	Kea; Kojima (Forfeit)	Draw (30:00)	Rotundo; Williams (Forfeit)	Tenryu; Tenta (11:48)
Arashi Araya	Animal; Muto (4:12)	Draw (30:00)	—N/a	Awesome; Friedman (14:00)	Draw (30:00)	Otani; Tanaka (Forfeit)	Rotundo; Williams (Forfeit)	Tenryu; Tenta (11:27)
Awesome Friedman	Animal; Muto (6:11)	Anjo; Nagai (11:31)	Awesome; Friedman (14:00)	—N/a	Kea; Kojima (15:43)	Otani; Tanaka (11:00)	Rotundo; Williams (12:34)	Tenryu; Tenta (10:08)
Kea Kojima	Kea; Kojima (16:54)	Kea; Kojima (Forfeit)	Draw (30:00)	Kea; Kojima (15:43)	—N/a	Kea; Kojima (14:39)	Kea; Kojima (22:00)	Tenryu; Tenta (18:31)
Otani Tanaka	Animal; Muto (16:31)	Draw (30:00)	Otani; Tanaka (Forfeit)	Otani; Tanaka (11:00)	Kea; Kojima (14:39)	—N/a	Draw (30:00)	Otani; Tanaka (15:09)
Rotundo Williams	Animal; Muto (10:03)	Rotundo; Williams (Forfeit)	Rotundo; Williams (Forfeit)	Rotundo; Williams (12:34)	Kea; Kojima (22:00)	Draw (30:00)	—N/a	Rotundo; Williams (5:58)
Tenryu Tenta	Tenryu; Tenta (13:31)	Tenryu; Tenta (11:48)	Tenryu; Tenta (11:27)	Tenryu; Tenta (10:08)	Tenryu; Tenta (18:31)	Otani; Tanaka (15:09)	Rotundo; Williams (5:58)	—N/a

=== 2003 ===
The 2003 Tag League, featuring 7 teams, was held from November 22 to December 2.

Final standings
Wrestlers	Score
Justin Credible and Jamal	8
Kaz Hayashi and Satoshi Kojima	8
Arashi and Keiji Muto	7
Nobutaka Araya and Toshiaki Kawada	7
D'Lo Brown and Taka Michinoku	6
Buchanan and Gigantes	6
Parka Guerrera and La Parka Original	0

Results	Arashi Muto	Araya Kawada	Brown Michinoku	Buchanan Gigantes	Credible Jamal	Guerrera Original	Hayashi Kojima
Arashi Muto	—N/a	Draw (30:00)	Arashi; Muto (19:54)	Buchanan; Gigantes (12:50)	Arashi; Muto (12:21)	Arashi; Muto (13:18)	Hayashi; Kojima (26:56)
Araya Kawada	Draw (30:00)	—N/a	Brown; Michinoku (15:26)	Araya; Kawada (11:21)	Credible; Jamal (10:22)	Araya; Kawada (8:56)	Araya; Kawada (25:24)
Brown Michinoku	Arashi; Muto (19:54)	Brown; Michinoku (15:26)	—N/a	Brown; Michinoku (12:16)	Credible; Jamal (6:18)	Brown; Michinoku (10:42)	Hayashi; Kojima (18:47)
Buchanan Gigantes	Buchanan; Gigantes (12:50)	Araya; Kawada (11:21)	Brown; Michinoku (12:16)	—N/a	Buchanan; Gigantes (6:18)	Buchanan; Gigantes (10:19)	Hayashi; Kojima (20:20)
Credible Jamal	Arashi; Muto (12:21)	Credible; Jamal (10:22)	Credible; Jamal (6:18)	Buchanan; Gigantes (6:18)	—N/a	Credible; Jamal (12:05)	Credible; Jamal (13:14)
Guerrera Original	Arashi; Muto (13:18)	Araya; Kawada (8:56)	Brown; Michinoku (10:42)	Buchanan; Gigantes (10:19)	Credible; Jamal (12:05)	—N/a	Hayashi; Kojima (13:38)
Hayashi Kojima	Hayashi; Kojima (26:56)	Araya; Kawada (25:24)	Hayashi; Kojima (18:47)	Hayashi; Kojima (20:20)	Credible; Jamal (13:14)	Hayashi; Kojima (13:38)	—N/a

Finals
1	Justin Credible and Jamal	Pin
2	Kaz Hayashi and Satoshi Kojima	17:50

=== 2004 ===
The 2004 Tag League was held from November 21 to December 1. It was the first to utilize a multi-block system, featuring 10 teams in two blocks, with the winners of each block facing each other in the final.

Final standings
Block A		Block B	
Kaz Hayashi and Satoshi Kojima	6	Jamal and Taiyō Kea	5
Keiji Muto and Osamu Nishimura	5	Toshiaki Kawada and Mitsuya Nagai	5
D'Lo Brown and Buchanan	5	Katsuhiko Nakajima and Kensuke Sasaki	4
GREAT MUTA and Love Machine Steele	4	Love Machine Storm and Super Love Machine	4
Tomoaki Honma and Kohei Suwama	0	Nobutaka Araya and Nobukazu Hirai	0

Block A	Brown Buchanan	Hayashi Kojima	Honma Suwama	MUTA Steele	Muto Nishimura
Brown Buchanan	—N/a	Hayashi; Kojima (20:40)	Brown; Buchanan (17:09)	Brown; Buchanan (13:39)	Draw (30:00)
Hayashi Kojima	Hayashi; Kojima (20:40)	—N/a	Hayashi; Kojima (18:12)	Hayashi; Kojima (18:07)	Muto; Nishimura (27:31)
Honma Suwama	Brown; Buchanan (17:09)	Hayashi; Kojima (18:12)	—N/a	MUTA; Steele (14:41)	Muto; Nishimura (25:02)
MUTA Steele	Brown; Buchanan (13:39)	Hayashi; Kojima (18:07)	MUTA; Steele (14:41)	—N/a	MUTA; Steele (10:49)
Muto Nishimura	Draw (30:00)	Muto; Nishimura (27:31)	Muto; Nishimura (25:02)	MUTA; Steele (10:49)	—N/a
Block B	Araya Hirai	Jamal Kea	Kawada Nagai	Nakajima Sasaki	Storm Super
Araya Hirai	—N/a	Jamal; Kea (14:12)	Kawada; Nagai (10:35)	Nakajima; Sasaki (12:12)	Storm; Super (10:08)
Jamal Kea	Jamal; Kea (14:12)	—N/a	Draw (30:00)	Jamal; Kea (18:15)	DDQ (12:09)
Kawada Nagai	Kawada; Nagai (10:35)	Draw (30:00)	—N/a	Kawada; Nagai (17:53)	Storm; Super (13:29)
Nakajima Sasaki	Nakajima; Sasaki (12:12)	Jamal; Kea (18:15)	Kawada; Nagai (17:53)	—N/a	Nakajima; Sasaki (15:00)
Storm Super	Storm; Super (10:08)	DDQ (12:09)	Storm; Super (13:29)	Nakajima; Sasaki (15:00)	—N/a

Block B Decision			Final
			A1	Kaz Hayashi and Satoshi Kojima	Pin
B1	Jamal and Taiyō Kea	Pin	B1	Jamal and Taiyō Kea	24:36
B2	Toshiaki Kawada and Mitsuya Nagai	17:07

=== 2005 ===
The 2005 Tag League, featuring 10 teams in two blocks, was held from November 20 to December 5.

Final standings
Block A		Block B	
Akebono and Keiji Muto	6	Bubba Ray and D–Von	8
Jamal and Taiyō Kea	4	Kaz Hayashi and Satoshi Kojima	4
Akira Raijin and Kohei Suwama	4	Katsuhiko Nakajima and Kensuke Sasaki	4
Akira and Arashi	2	D'Lo Brown and Buchanan	4
Giant Bernard and Taru	2	Shuji Kondo and "brother" Yasshi	0

Block A	Akebono Muto	Akira Arashi	Bernard Taru	Jamal Kea	Raijin Suwama
Akebono Muto	—N/a	Akebono; Muto (12:44)	Bernard; Taru (21:47)	Akebono; Muto (21:48)	Akebono; Muto (16:48)
AKIRA Arashi	Akebono; Muto (12:44)	—N/a	Akira; Arashi (18:10)	Jamal; Kea (15:51)	Raijin; Suwama (21:28)
Bernard TARU	Bernard; Taru (21:47)	Akira; Arashi (18:10)	—N/a	DDQ (18:02)	Raijin; Suwama (13:13)
Jamal Kea	Akebono; Muto (21:48)	Jamal; Kea (15:51)	DDQ (18:02)	—N/a	Jamal; Kea (13:13)
Raijin Suwama	Akebono; Muto (16:48)	Raijin; Suwama (21:28)	Raijin; Suwama (13:13)	Jamal; Kea (13:13)	—N/a
Block B	Brown Buchanan	Bubba Ray D–Von	Hayashi Kojima	Kondo Yasshi	Nakajima Sasaki
Brown Buchanan	—N/a	Bubba Ray; D–Von (12:12)	Hayashi; Kojima (16:25)	Brown; Buchanan (8:00)	Brown; Buchanan (16:25)
Bubba Ray D–Von	Bubba Ray; D–Von (12:12)	—N/a	Bubba Ray; D–Von (15:45)	Bubba Ray; D–Von (10:54)	Bubba Ray; D–Von (14:14)
Hayashi Kojima	Hayashi; Kojima (16:25)	Bubba Ray; D–Von (15:45)	—N/a	Hayashi; Kojima (18:01)	Nakajima; Sasaki (19:59)
Kondo Yasshi	Brown; Buchanan (8:00)	Bubba Ray; D–Von (10:54)	Hayashi; Kojima (18:01)	—N/a	Nakajima; Sasaki (13:25)
Nakajima Sasaki	Brown; Buchanan (16:25)	Bubba Ray; D–Von (14:14)	Nakajima; Sasaki (19:59)	Nakajima; Sasaki (13:25)	—N/a

Final
A1	Akebono and Muto	Pin
B1	Bubba Ray and D–Von	20:23

=== 2006 ===
The 2006 Tag League, featuring 7 teams, was held from November 19 to December 2.

Final standings
Wrestlers	Score
RO'Z and Suwama	9
Toshiaki Kawada and Keiji Muto	8
Satoshi Kojima and Hiroyoshi Tenzan	8
D'Lo Brown and Buchanan	6
Kaz Hayashi and Katsuhiko Nakajima	5
Taiyō Kea and Taka Michinoku	5
Nosawa Rongai and Minoru Suzuki	1

Results	Brown Buchanan	Hayashi Nakajima	Kawada Muto	Kea Michinoku	Kojima Tenzan	Rongai Suzuki	RO'Z Suwama
Brown Buchanan	—N/a	Brown; Buchanan (16:54)	Brown; Buchanan (13:40)	Kea; Michinoku (14:11)	Kojima; Tenzan (23:55)	Brown; Buchanan (12:51)	RO'Z; Suwama (16:18)
Hayashi Nakajima	Brown; Buchanan (16:54)	—N/a	Kawada; Muto (17:42)	Draw (30:00)	Kojima; Tenzan (21:39)	Hayashi; Nakajima (18:55)	Hayashi; Nakajima (19:15)
Kawada Muto	Brown; Buchanan (13:40)	Kawada; Muto (17:42)	—N/a	Kawada; Muto (18:21)	Kawada; Muto (29:29)	Kawada; Muto (16:58)	RO'Z; Suwama (23:21)
Kea Michinoku	Kea; Michinoku (14:11)	Draw (30:00)	Kawada; Muto (18:21)	—N/a	Kojima; Tenzan (18:38)	Kea; Michinoku (15:14)	RO'Z; Suwama (16:44)
Kojima Tenzan	Kojima; Tenzan (23:55)	Kojima; Tenzan (21:39)	Kawada; Muto (29:29)	Kojima; Tenzan (18:38)	—N/a	Draw (30:00)	Draw (30:00)
Rongai Suzuki	Brown; Buchanan (12:51)	Hayashi; Nakajima (19:15)	Kawada; Muto (16:58)	Kea; Michinoku (15:14)	Draw (30:00)	—N/a	RO'Z; Suwama (13:40)
RO'Z Suwama	RO'Z; Suwama (16:18)	Hayashi; Nakajima (19:15)	RO'Z; Suwama (23:21)	RO'Z; Suwama (16:44)	Draw (30:00)	RO'Z; Suwama (13:40)	—N/a

Finalist Decision			Final
			1	RO'Z and Suwama	Pin
2	Toshiaki Kawada and Keiji Muto	Pin	3	Satoshi Kojima and Hiroyoshi Tenzan	24:21
3	Satoshi Kojima and Hiroyoshi Tenzan	23:28

=== 2007 ===
The 2007 Tag League featured 8 teams and was held from November 23 to December 9.

Final standings
Wrestlers	Score
Joe Doering and Keiji Muto	11
Toshiaki Kawada and Kensuke Sasaki	10
Satoshi Kojima and Suwama	10
Abdullah the Butcher and Minoru Suzuki	8
Masanobu Fuchi and Osamu Nishimura	7
Taiyō Kea and Hawaiian Lion	6
Nobutaka Araya and Toru Owashi	2
Taru and Zodiac	0

Results	Abdullah Suzuki	Araya Owashi	Doering Muto	Fuchi Nishimura	Kawada Sasaki	Kea Lion	Kojima Suwama	Taru Zodiac
Abdullah Suzuki	—N/a	Abdullah; Suzuki (9:18)	Doering; Muto (13:59)	Abdullah; Suzuki (12:34)	Abdullah; Suzuki (10:48)	Abdullah; Suzuki (14:25)	Kojima; Suwama (12:13)	DCO (7:25)
Araya Owashi	Abdullah; Suzuki (9:18)	—N/a	Doering; Muto (15:15)	Fuchi; Nishimura (14:37)	Kawada; Sasaki (5:11)	Kea; Lion (21:34)	Kojima; Suwama (11:34)	Araya; Owashi (11:02)
Doering Muto	Doering; Muto (13:59)	Doering; Muto (15:15)	—N/a	Draw (30:00)	Kawada; Sasaki (21:10)	Doering; Muto (23:08)	Doering; Muto (23:03)	Doering; Muto (10:11)
Fuchi Nishimura	Abdullah; Suzuki (12:34)	Fuchi; Nishimura (14:37)	Draw (30:00)	—N/a	Draw (30:00)	Draw (30:00)	Kojima; Suwama (14:01)	Fuchi; Nishimura (4:28)
Kawada Sasaki	Abdullah; Suzuki (10:48)	Kawada; Sasaki (5:11)	Kawada; Sasaki (21:10)	Draw (30:00)	—N/a	Draw (30:00)	Kawada; Sasaki (17:28)	Kawada; Sasaki (11:26)
Kea Lion	Abdullah; Suzuki (14:25)	Kea; Lion (21:34)	Doering; Muto (23:08)	Draw (30:00)	Draw (30:00)	—N/a	Kojima; Suwama (18:34)	Kea; Lion (8:23)
Kojima Suwama	Kojima; Suwama (12:13)	Kojima; Suwama (11:34)	Doering; Muto (23:03)	Kojima; Suwama (14:01)	Kawada; Sasaki (17:28)	Kojima; Suwama (18:34)	—N/a	Kojima; Suwama (15:41)
Taru Zodiac	DCO (7:25)	Araya; Owashi (11:02)	Doering; Muto (10:11)	Fuchi; Nishimura (4:28)	Kawada; Sasaki (11:26)	Kea; Lion (8:23)	Kojima; Suwama (15:41)	—N/a

Semifinal			Final
			1	Joe Doering and Keiji Muto	Pin
2	Toshiaki Kawada and Kensuke Sasaki	Pin	3	Satoshi Kojima and Suwama	26:05
3	Satoshi Kojima and Suwama	15:18

=== 2008 ===
The 2008 league was held from November 22 to December 8 and featured 8 teams.

Final standings
Wrestlers	Score
Shuji Kondo and Suwama	9
Satoshi Kojima and Hiroyoshi Tenzan	9
Joe Doering and Zodiac	8
Taiyō Kea and Minoru Suzuki	8
Ryota Hama and Keiji Muto	6
Kaz Hayashi and Osamu Nishimura	6
Hate and Taru	4
Seiya Sanada and Manabu Soya	4

Results	Doering Zodiac	Hama Muto	Hate Taru	Hayashi Nishimura	Kea Suzuki	Kojima Tenzan	Kondo Suwama	Sanada Soya
Doering Zodiac	—N/a	Hama; Muto (14:02)	Doering; Zodiac (9:25)	Hayashi; Nishimura	Doering; Zodiac (20:03)	Doering; Zodiac (14:24)	Doering; Zodiac (12:40)	Sanada; Soya (Forfeit)
Hama Muto	Hama; Muto (14:02)	—N/a	Hama; Muto (12:47)	Hama; Muto (20:07)	Kea; Suzuki (20:27)	Kojima; Tenzan (23:17)	Kondo; Suwama (17:05)	Sanada; Soya (18:47)
Hate Taru	Doering; Zodiac (9:25)	Hama; Muto (12:47)	—N/a	Hate; Taru (17:00)	DCO (18:04)	Kojima; Tenzan (14:30)	Kondo; Suwama (14:24)	Hate; Taru (13:30)
Hayashi Nishimura	Hayashi; Nishimura	Hama; Muto (20:07)	Hate; Taru (17:00)	—N/a	Draw (30:00)	Kojima; Tenzan (21:48)	Draw (30:00)	Hayashi; Nishimura (21:05)
Kea Suzuki	Doering; Zodiac (20:03)	Kea; Suzuki (20:27)	DCO (18:04)	Draw (30:00)	—N/a	Draw (30:00)	Kea; Suzuki (20:38)	Kea; Suzuki (14:07)
Kojima Tenzan	Doering; Zodiac (14:24)	Kojima; Tenzan (23:17)	Kojima; Tenzan (14:30)	Kojima; Tenzan (21:48)	Draw (30:00)	—N/a	Kondo; Suwama (29:26)	Kojima; Tenzan (15:39)
Kondo Suwama	Doering; Zodiac (12:40)	Kondo; Suwama (17:05)	Kondo; Suwama (14:24)	Draw (30:00)	Kea; Suzuki (20:38)	Kondo; Suwama (29:26)	—N/a	Kondo; Suwama (17:23)
Sanada Soya	Sanada; Soya (Forfeit)	Sanada; Soya (18:47)	Hate; Taru (13:30)	Hayashi; Nishimura (21:05)	Kea; Suzuki (14:07)	Kojima; Tenzan (15:39)	Kondo; Suwama (17:23)	—N/a

Final
1	Shuji Kondo and Suwama	Pin
2	Satoshi Kojima and Hiroyoshi Tenzan	28:36

=== 2009 ===
The 2009 Tag League, featuring 9 teams, was held from November 23 to December 6.

Final standings
Wrestlers	Score
Keiji Muto and Masakatsu Funaki	11
Suwama and Masayuki Kono	11
Taiyō Kea and Minoru Suzuki	10
Riki Choshu and Manabu Soya	10
Akebono and Ryota Hama	8
Satoshi Kojima and Zodiac	8
Yoshihiro Takayama and Nosawa Rongai	6
Osamu Nishimura and Seiya Sanada	4
Taru and Joe Doering	4

Results	Akebono Hama	Muto Funaki	Nishimura Sanada	Choshu Soya	Kojima Zodiac	Suwama Kono	Kea Suzuki	Taru Doering	Takayama Rongai
Akebono Hama	—N/a	Akebono; Hama (12:37)	Akebono; Hama (Forfeit)	Choshu; Soya (10:14)	Akebono; Hama (12:23)	Suwama; Kono (16:35)	Akebono; Hama (16:38)	Taru; Doering (12:32)	Takayama; Rongai (11:18)
Muto Funaki	Akebono; Hama (12:37)	—N/a	Muto; Funaki (Forfeit)	Muto; Funaki (18:21)	Muto; Funaki (Forfeit)	Draw (30:00)	Kea; Suzuki (16:57)	Muto; Funaki (13:42)	Muto; Funaki (12:12)
Nishimura Sanada	Akebono; Hama (Forfeit)	Muto; Funaki (Forfeit)	—N/a	Choshu; Soya (Forfeit)	Kojima; Zodiac (15:21)	Suwama; Kono (Forfeit)	Nishimura; Sanada (18:02)	Nishimura; Sanada (13:40)	Takayama; Rongai (Forfeit)
Choshu Soya	Choshu; Soya (10:14)	Muto; Funaki (18:21)	Choshu; Soya (Forfeit)	—N/a	Choshu; Soya (16:01)	Suwama; Kono (11:29)	Kea; Suzuki (12:14)	Choshu; Soya (Forfeit)	Choshu; Soya (11:46)
Kojima Zodiac	Akebono; Hama (12:23)	Muto; Funaki (Forfeit)	Kojima; Zodiac (15:21)	Choshu; Soya (16:01)	—N/a	Kojima; Zodiac (21:16)	Kojima; Zodiac (18:20)	Taru; Doering (17:52)	Kojima; Zodiac (12:55)
Suwama Kono	Suwama; Kono (16:35)	Draw (30:00)	Suwama; Kono (Forfeit)	Suwama; Kono (11:29)	Kojima; Zodiac (21:16)	—N/a	Kea; Suzuki (26:27)	Suwama; Kono (16:01)	Suwama; Kono (12:50)
Kea Suzuki	Akebono; Hama (16:38)	Kea; Suzuki (16:57)	Nishimura; Sanada (18:02)	Kea; Suzuki (12:14)	Kojima; Zodiac (18:20)	Kea; Suzuki (26:27)	—N/a	Kea; Suzuki (Forfeit)	Kea; Suzuki (18:10)
Taru Doering	Taru; Doering (12:32)	Muto; Funaki (13:42)	Nishimura; Sanada (13:40)	Choshu; Soya (Forfeit)	Taru; Doering (17:52)	Suwama; Kono (16:01)	Kea; Suzuki (Forfeit)	—N/a	Takayama; Rongai (Forfeit)
Takayama Rongai	Takayama; Rongai (11:18)	Muto; Funaki (12:12)	Takayama; Rongai (Forfeit)	Choshu; Soya (11:46)	Kojima; Zodiac (12:55)	Suwama; Kono (12:50)	Kea; Suzuki (18:10)	Takayama; Rongai (Forfeit)	—N/a

Final
1	Keiji Muto and Masakatsu Funaki	Pin
2	Suwama and Masayuki Kono	26:13

=== 2010 ===
The 2010 Tag League, featuring 9 teams, was held from November 20 to December 7.

Final standings
Wrestlers	Score
Kenso and Kono	12
Masakatsu Funaki and Minoru Suzuki	11
Ryota Hama and Suwama	11
Akebono and Taiyō Kea	10
Dark Cuervo and Dark Ozz	8
Manabu Soya and Seiya Sanada	7
René Duprée and Taru	6
Joe Malenko and Osamu Nishimura	5
Tamon Honda and Tsuyoshi Kikuchi	2

Results	Akebono Kea	Cuervo Ozz	Malenko Nishimura	Kenso Kono	Soya Sanada	Funaki Suzuki	Duprée Taru	Hama Suwama	Honda Kikuchi
Akebono Kea	—N/a	Akebono; Kea (9:06)	Malenko; Nishimura (15:04)	Kenso; Kono (13:36)	Akebono; Kea (16:53)	Akebono; Kea (20:35)	Duprée; Taru (6:28)	Akebono; Kea (16:42)	Akebono; Kea (12:01)
Cuervo Ozz	Akebono; Kea (9:06)	—N/a	Cuervo; Ozz (9:58)	Cuervo; Ozz (7:20)	Soya; Sanada (11:24)	Funaki; Suzuki (9:20)	Cuervo; Ozz (15:18)	Hama; Suwama (9:43)	Cuervo; Ozz (6:40)
Malenko Nishimura	Malenko; Nishimura (15:04)	Cuervo; Ozz (9:58)	—N/a	Kenso; Kono (18:43)	Soya; Sanada (26:00)	Draw (30:00)	Duprée; Taru (12:28)	Hama; Suwama (15:37)	Malenko; Nishimura (11:16)
Kenso Kono	Kenso; Kono (13:36)	Cuervo; Ozz (7:20)	Kenso; Kono (18:43)	—N/a	Kenso; Kono (15:21)	Kenso; Kono (15:31)	Kenso; Kono (11:48)	Hama; Suwama (14:30)	Kenso; Kono (17:25)
Soya Sanada	Akebono; Kea (16:53)	Soya; Sanada (11:24)	Soya; Sanada (26:00)	Kenso; Kono (15:21)	—N/a	Funaki; Suzuki (17:43)	Soya; Sanada (14:57)	Draw (30:00)	Honda; Kikuchi (15:01)
Funaki Suzuki	Akebono; Kea (20:35)	Funaki; Suzuki (9:20)	Draw (30:00)	Kenso; Kono (15:31)	Funaki; Suzuki (17:43)	—N/a	Funaki; Suzuki (11:46)	Funaki; Suzuki (23:12)	Funaki; Suzuki (14:37)
Duprée Taru	Duprée; Taru (6:28)	Cuervo; Ozz (15:18)	Duprée; Taru (12:28)	Kenso; Kono (11:48)	Soya; Sanada (14:57)	Funaki; Suzuki (11:46)	—N/a	Hama; Suwama (11:45)	Duprée; Taru (9:18)
Hama Suwama	Akebono; Kea (16:42)	Hama; Suwama (9:43)	Hama; Suwama (15:37)	Hama; Suwama (14:30)	Draw (30:00)	Funaki; Suzuki (23:12)	Hama; Suwama (11:45)	—N/a	Hama; Suwama (13:04)
Honda Kikuchi	Akebono; Kea (12:01)	Cuervo; Ozz (6:40)	Malenko; Nishimura (11:16)	Kenso; Kono (17:25)	Honda; Kikuchi (15:01)	Funaki; Suzuki (14:37)	Duprée; Taru (9:18)	Hama; Suwama (13:04)	—N/a

Semifinal			Final
			1	Kenso and Kono	Pin
2	Masakatsu Funaki and Minoru Suzuki	Pin	3	Ryota Hama and Suwama	20:44
3	Ryota Hama and Suwama	17:53

=== 2011 ===
The 2011 Tag League, featuring 9 teams, was held from November 19 to December 4.

Final standings
Wrestlers	Score
Masakatsu Funaki and Masayuki Kono	12
Kai and Seiya Sanada	11
Manabu Soya and Takao Omori	10
Akebono and Ryota Hama	10
Daisuke Sekimoto and Yuji Okabayashi	10
Big Daddy and Joe Doering	10
Koji Kanemoto and Minoru Tanaka	8
Masanobu Fuchi and Taiyō Kea	7
Kaz Hayashi and Kenso	6
Suwama and Takumi Soya	6

Results	Akebono Hama	Big Daddy Doering	Sekimoto Okabayashi	Kai Sanada	Hayashi Kenso	Kanemoto Tanaka	M.Soya Omori	Funaki Kono	Fuchi Kea	Suwama T.Soya
Akebono Hama	—N/a	Akebono; Hama (6:24)	Akebono; Hama (13:35)	Kai; Sanada (10:58)	Akebono; Hama (10:11)	Akebono; Hama (8:32)	M.Soya; Omori (12:32)	Funaki; Kono (11:38)	Fuchi; Kea (9:17)	Akebono; Hama (18:48)
Big Daddy Doering	Akebono; Hama (6:24)	—N/a	Sekimoto; Okabayashi (8:48)	Big Daddy; Doering (10:03)	Hayashi; Kenso (9:20)	Big Daddy; Doering (7:53)	Big Daddy; Doering (13:13)	Funaki; Kono (7:01)	Big Daddy; Doering (7:16)	Big Daddy; Doering (9:31)
Sekimoto Okabayashi	Akebono; Hama (13:35)	Sekimoto; Okabayashi (8:48)	—N/a	Kai; Sanada (15:58)	Sekimoto; Okabayashi (17:40)	Sekimoto; Okabayashi (20:26)	Sekimoto; Okabayashi (20:18)	Funaki; Kono (16:28)	Sekimoto; Okabayashi (14:31)	Suwama; T.Soya (24:34)
Kai Sanada	Kai; Sanada (10:58)	Big Daddy; Doering (10:03)	Kai; Sanada (15:58)	—N/a	Kai; Sanada (18:36)	Kai; Sanada (19:22)	M.Soya; Omori (17:10)	Funaki; Kono (17:16)	Draw (30:00)	Kai; Sanada (22:01)
Hayashi Kenso	Akebono; Hama (10:11)	Hayashi; Kenso (9:20)	Sekimoto; Okabayashi (17:40)	Kai; Sanada (18:36)	—N/a	Kanemoto; Tanaka (10:47)	M.Soya; Omori (12:45)	Hayashi; Kenso (12:48)	Fuchi; Kea (12:13)	Hayashi; Kenso (18:52)
Kanemoto Tanaka	Akebono; Hama (8:32)	Big Daddy; Doering (7:53)	Sekimoto; Okabayashi (20:26)	Kai; Sanada (19:22)	Kanemoto; Tanaka (10:47)	—N/a	Kanemoto; Tanaka (19:40)	Funaki; Kono (13:48)	Kanemoto; Tanaka (8:17)	Kanemoto; Tanaka (19:07)
M.Soya Omori	M.Soya omori (12:32)	Big Daddy; Doering (13:13)	Sekimoto; Okabayashi (20:18)	M.Soya; Omori (17:10)	M.Soya; Omori (12:45)	Kanemoto; Tanaka (19:40)	—N/a	M.Soya; Omori (18:17)	M.Soya; Omori (14:35)	Suwama; T.Soya (10:37)
Funaki Kono	Funaki; Kono (11:38)	Funaki; Kono (7:01)	Funaki; Kono (16:28)	Funaki; Kono (17:16)	Hayashi; Kenso (12:48)	Funaki; Kono (13:48)	M.Soya; Omori (18:17)	—N/a	Funaki; Kono (16:17)	Suwama; T.Soya (21:46)
Fuchi Kea	Fuchi; Kea (9:17)	Big Daddy; Doering (7:16)	Sekimoto; Okabayashi (14:31)	Draw (30:00)	Fuchi; Kea (12:13)	Kanemoto; Tanaka (8:17)	M.Soya; Omori (14:35)	Funaki; Kono (16:17)	—N/a	Fuchi; Kea (18:22)
Suwama T.Soya	Akebono; Hama (18:48)	Big Daddy; Doering (9:31)	Suwama; T.Soya (24:34)	Kai; Sanada (22:01)	Hayashi; Kenso (18:52)	Kanemoto; Tanaka (19:07)	Suwama; T.Soya (10:37)	Suwama; T.Soya (21:46)	Fuchi; Kea (18:22)	—N/a

Final
1	Masakatsu Funaki and Masayuki Kono	Pin
2	Kai and Seiya Sanada	18:03

=== 2012 ===
The 2012 Tag League was held from November 17 to November 30. It was only the second to utilize a multi-block system, featuring 10 teams in two blocks, with the winners of each block facing each other in the final, contested for the vacant World Tag Team Championship. Kenso and Great Sasuke were forced to pull out of the tournament and forfeit all of their matches after Sasuke suffered a shoulder injury.

Final standings
Block A		Block B	
Takao Omori and Manabu Soya	7	Joe Doering and Suwama	6
Masakatsu Funaki and Masayuki Kono	6	Koji Kanemoto and Minoru Tanaka	5
Tomoaki Honma and Kazushi Miyamoto	4	Akebono and Ryota Hama	4
Taiyō Kea and Seiya Sanada	3	Daisuke Sekimoto and Yuji Okabayashi	3
Kenso and Great Sasuke	0	Bambi Killer and Franz Dynamite	2

Block A	Funaki Kono	Honma Miyamoto	Kea Sanada	Kenso Sasuke	Omori Soya
Funaki Kono	—N/a	Funaki; Kono (9:21)	Funaki; Kono (11:13)	Funaki; Kono (forfeit)	Omori; Soya (13:38)
Honma Miyamoto	Funaki; Kono (9:21)	—N/a	Honma; Miyamoto (12:36)	Honma; Miyamoto (forfeit)	Omori; Soya (8:17)
Kea Sanada	Funaki; Kono (11:13)	Honma; Miyamoto (12:36)	—N/a	Kea; Sanada (forfeit)	Draw (30:00)
Kenso Sasuke	Funaki; Kono (forfeit)	Honma; Miyamoto (forfeit)	Kea; Sanada (forfeit)	—N/a	Omori; Soya (forfeit)
Omori Soya	Omori; Soya (13:38)	Omori; Soya (8:17)	Draw (30:00)	Omori; Soya (forfeit)	—N/a
Block B	Akebono Hama	Bambi Dynamite	Doering Suwama	Kanemoto Tanaka	Sekimoto Okabayashi
Akebono Hama	—N/a	Bambi; Dynamite (8:10)	Akebono; Hama (14:07)	Kanemoto; Tanaka (9:13)	Akebono; Hama (11:29)
Bambi Dynamite	Bambi; Dynamite (8:10)	—N/a	Doering; Suwama (9:34)	Kanemoto; Tanaka (13:37)	Sekimoto; Okabayashi (10:47)
Doering Suwama	Akebono; Hama (14:07)	Doering; Suwama (9:34)	—N/a	Doering; Suwama (17:27)	Doering; Suwama (9:00)
Kanemoto Tanaka	Kanemoto; Tanaka (9:13)	Kanemoto; Tanaka (13:37)	Doering; Suwama (17:27)	—N/a	Draw (30:00)
Sekimoto Okabayashi	Akebono; Hama (11:29)	Sekimoto; Okabayashi (10:47)	Doering; Suwama (9:00)	Draw (30:00)	—N/a

Final
A1	Takao Omori and Manabu Soya	Pin
B1	Joe Doering and Suwama	19:14

=== 2013 ===
The 2013 Tag League, featuring 8 teams, will be held from November 30 to December 8. Bambi Killer was originally scheduled to take part in the tournament, but was forced to pull out due to a neck injury and was replaced by Kenso.

Final standings
Wrestlers	Score
Joe Doering and Suwama	11
Kento Miyahara and Go Shiozaki	10
Jun Akiyama and Takao Omori	9
Akebono and Yoshinobu Kanemaru	8
Maybach β and James Raideen	8
Dark Cuervo and Dark Ozz	4
D'Lo Brown and Kenso	2
Atsushi Aoki and Kotaro Suzuki	2

Results	Akebono Kanemaru	Akiyama Omori	Aoki Suzuki	Brown Kenso	Cuervo Ozz	Doering Suwama	Maybach Raideen	Miyahara Shiozaki
Akebono Kanemaru	—N/a	Akiyama; Omori (13:42)	Akebono; Kanemaru (11:05)	Akebono; Kanemaru (8:46)	Akebono; Kanemaru (10:31)	Doering; Suwama (11:28)	Akebono; Kanemaru (9:45)	Miyahara; Shiozaki (15:58)
Akiyama Omori	Akiyama; Omori (13:42)	—N/a	Aoki; Suzuki (13:14)	NC (16:27)	Akiyama; Omori (11:57)	Akiyama; Omori (19:58)	Akiyama; Omori (13:02)	Draw (30:00)
Aoki Suzuki	Akebono; Kanemaru (11:05)	Aoki; Suzuki (13:14)	—N/a	Brown; Kenso (12:00)	Cuervo; Ozz (13:28)	Doering; Suwama (14:14)	Maybach; Raideen (13:22)	Miyahara; Shiozaki (18:16)
Brown Kenso	Akebono; Kanemaru (8:46)	NC (16:27)	Brown; Kenso (12:00)	—N/a	Cuervo; Ozz (2:42)	Doering; Suwama (11:49)	Maybach; Raideen (11:15)	Miyahara; Shiozaki (13:57)
Cuervo Ozz	Akebono; Kanemaru (10:31)	Akiyama; Omori (11:57)	Cuervo; Ozz (13:28)	Cuervo; Ozz (2:42)	—N/a	Doering; Suwama (13:05)	Maybach; Raideen (9:41)	Miyahara; Shiozaki (13:42)
Doering Suwama	Doering; Suwama (11:28)	Akiyama; Omori (19:58)	Doering; Suwama (14:14)	Doering; Suwama (11:49)	Doering; Suwama (13:05)	—N/a	Doering; Suwama (16:20)	Draw (30:00)
Maybach Raideen	Akebono; Kanemaru (9:45)	Akiyama; Omori (13:02)	Maybach; Raideen (13:22)	Maybach; Raideen (11:15)	Maybach; Raideen (9:41)	Doering; Suwama (16:20)	—N/a	Maybach; Raideen (13:45)
Miyahara Shiozaki	Miyahara; Shiozaki (15:58)	Draw (30:00)	Miyahara; Shiozaki (18:16)	Miyahara; Shiozaki (13:57)	Miyahara; Shiozaki (13:42)	Draw (30:00)	Maybach; Raideen (13:45)	—N/a

Final
1	Joe Doering and Suwama	Pin
2	Kento Miyahara and Go Shiozaki	25:53

=== 2014 ===
The 2014 Tag League, featuring 8 teams, took place from November 16 to December 6. Atsushi Aoki and Hikaru Sato earned a spot in the tournament by winning the 2014 Jr. Tag Battle of Glory in October. The tournament was contested for the World Tag Team Championship, which Jun Akiyama and Takao Omori vacated on October 23 in time for the tournament.

Final standings
Wrestlers	Score
Kento Miyahara and Go Shiozaki	10
Jun Akiyama and Takao Omori	9
Akebono and Yutaka Yoshie	8
Joe Doering and Suwama	8
The Bodyguard and Zeus	8
Atsushi Aoki and Hikaru Sato	5
Kengo Mashimo and Tank Nagai	4
Kenso and Mitsuya Nagai	4

Results	Akebono Yoshie	Akiyama Omori	Aoki Sato	Bodyguard Zeus	Doering Suwama	Kenso M.Nagai	Mashimo T.Nagai	Miyahara Shiozaki
Akebono Yoshie	—N/a	Akiyama; Omori (16:46)	Akebono; Yoshie (15:49)	Bodyguard; Zeus (10:40)	Akebono; Yoshie (20:06)	Akebono; Yoshie (8:08)	Akebono; Yoshie (9:22)	Miyahara; Shiozaki (20:37)
Akiyama Omori	Akiyama; Omori (16:46)	—N/a	Akiyama; Omori (20:39)	Akiyama; Omori (14:14)	Doering; Suwama (6:38)	Kenso; M.Nagai (15:53)	Akiyama; Omori (18:10)	Draw (30:00)
Aoki Sato	Akebono; Yoshie (15:49)	Akiyama; Omori (20:39)	—N/a	Aoki; Sato (14:58)	Doering; Suwama (19:23)	Aoki; Sato (10:44)	Mashimo; T.Nagai (16:42)	Draw (30:00)
Bodyguard Zeus	Bodyguard; Zeus (10:40)	Akiyama; Omori (14:14)	Aoki; Sato (14:58)	—N/a	Doering; Suwama (16:48)	Bodyguard; Zeus (17:11)	Bodyguard; Zeus (12:06)	Bodyguard; Zeus (17:46)
Doering Suwama	Akebono; Yoshie (20:06)	Doering; Suwama (6:38)	Doering; Suwama (19:23)	Doering; Suwama (16:48)	—N/a	Kenso; M.Nagai (16:52)	Doering; Suwama (14:26)	Miyahara; Shiozaki (17:12)
Kenso M.Nagai	Akebono; Yoshie (8:08)	Kenso; M.Nagai (15:53)	Aoki; Sato (10:44)	Bodyguard; Zeus (17:11)	Kenso; M.Nagai (16:52)	—N/a	Mashimo; T.Nagai (14:46)	Miyahara; Shiozaki (20:53)
Mashimo T.Nagai	Akebono; Yoshie (9:22)	Akiyama; Omori (18:10)	Mashimo; T.Nagai (16:42)	Bodyguard; Zeus (12:06)	Doering; Suwama (14:26)	Mashimo; T.Nagai (14:46)	—N/a	Miyahara; Shiozaki (19:46)
Miyahara Shiozaki	Miyahara; Shiozaki (20:37)	Draw (30:00)	Draw (30:00)	Bodyguard; Zeus (17:46)	Miyahara; Shiozaki (17:12)	Miyahara; Shiozaki (20:53)	Miyahara; Shiozaki (19:46)	—N/a

Final
1	Kento Miyahara and Go Shiozaki	Pin
2	Jun Akiyama and Takao Omori	27:47

=== 2015 ===
The 2015 World's Strongest Tag Determination League took place from November 23 to December 6. After their win, Suwama and Miyahara turned on each other.

Final standings
Wrestlers	Score
Kento Miyahara and Suwama	8
Bodyguard and Zeus	8
Jun Akiyama and Takao Omori	6
Shigehiro Irie and Yutaka Yoshie	6
Hoshitango and Shuji Ishikawa	6
Kenso and Osamu Nishimura	6
Yuma Aoyagi and Naoya Nomura	2

Results	Akiyama Omori	Aoyagi Nomura	Bodyguard Zeus	Hoshitango Ishikawa	Irie Yoshie	Kenso Nishimura	Miyahara Suwama
Akiyama Omori	—N/a	Akiyama; Omori (17:43)	Bodyguard; Zeus (16:58)	Akiyama; Omori (12:07)	Akiyama; Omori (21:09)	Kenso; Nishimura (13:52)	Miyahara; Suwama (19:03)
Aoyagi Nomura	Akiyama; Omori (17:43)	—N/a	Bodyguard; Zeus (14:19)	Hoshitango; Ishikawa (14:50)	Irie; Yoshie (16:49)	Aoyagi; Nomura (10:53)	Miyahara; Suwama (15:42)
Bodyguard Zeus	Bodyguard; Zeus (16:58)	Bodyguard; Zeus (14:19)	—N/a	Hoshitango; Ishikawa (12:43)	Bodyguard; Zeus (15:47)	Kenso; Nishimura (11:23)	Bodyguard; Zeus (16:43)
Hoshitango Ishikawa	Akiyama; Omori (12:07)	Hoshitango; Ishikawa (14:50)	Hoshitango; Ishikawa (12:43)	—N/a	Irie; Yoshie (8:12)	Hoshitango; Ishikawa (13:13)	Miyahara; Suwama (14:08)
Irie Yoshie	Akiyama; Omori (21:09)	Irie; Yoshie (16:49)	Bodyguard; Zeus (15:47)	Irie; Yoshie (8:12)	—N/a	Irie; Yoshie (18:12)	Miyahara; Suwama (19:32)
Kenso Nishimura	Kenso; Nishimura (13:52)	Aoyagi; Nomura (10:53)	Kenso; Nishimura (11:23)	Hoshitango; Ishikawa (13:13)	Irie; Yoshie (18:12)	—N/a	Kenso; Nishimura (13:15)
Miyahara Suwama	Miyahara; Suwama (19:03)	Miyahara; Suwama (15:42)	Bodyguard; Zeus (16:43)	Miyahara; Suwama (14:08)	Miyahara; Suwama (19:32)	Kenso; Nishimura (13:15)	—N/a

Playoff
1	Bodyguard and Zeus	Pin
2	Kento Miyahara and Suwama	9:36

=== 2016 ===
The 2016 edition of the World Strongest Tag Determination League took place from December 3 through December 18.

Final standings
Block A		Block B	
Jake Lee and Kento Miyahara	8	Takao Omori and Manabu Soya	10
Atsushi Aoki and Suwama	6	Jun Akiyama and Kendo Kashin	8
Kengo Mashimo and Tank Nagai	6	Bodyguard and Zeus	6
Osamu Nishimura and Yutaka Yoshie	4	Yuma Aoyagi and Naoya Nomura	2
Rikiya Fudo and Ryoji Sai	4	Koji Doi and Kumagoro	2
Black Tiger VII and Mitsuya Nagai	2	Hikaru Sato and Super Tiger	2

Block A	Aoki Suwama	Fudo Sai	Lee Miyahara	Mashimo Nagai	Nishimura Yoshie	Tiger VII Nagai
Aoki Suwama	—N/a	Fudo; Sai (11:32)	Lee; Miyahara (14:18)	Aoki; Suwama (13:27)	Aoki; Suwama (18:28)	Aoki; Suwama (10:53)
Fudo Sai	Fudo; Sai (11:32)	—N/a	Lee; Miyahara (14:03)	Mashimo; Nagai (10:35)	Nishimura; Yoshie (10:15)	Fudo; Sai (8:09)
Lee Miyahara	Lee; Miyahara (14:18)	Lee; Miyahara (14:03)	—N/a	Mashimo; Nagai (13:38)	Lee; Miyahara (13:53)	Lee; Miyahara (17:57)
Mashimo Nagai	Aoki; Suwama (13:27)	Mashimo; Nagai (10:35)	Mashimo; Nagai (13:38)	—N/a	Nishimura; Yoshie (9:16)	Mashimo; Nagai (9:20)
Nishimura Yoshie	Aoki; Suwama (18:28)	Nishimura; Yoshie (10:15)	Lee; Miyahara (13:53)	Nishimura; Yoshie (9:16)	—N/a	Tiger VII; Nagai (8:20)
Tiger VII Nagai	Aoki; Suwama (10:53)	Fudo; Sai (8:09)	Lee; Miyahara (17:57)	Mashimo; Nagai (9:20)	Tiger VII; Nagai (8:20)	—N/a
Block B	Akiyama Kashin	Aoyagi Nomura	Bodyguard Zeus	Doi Kumagoro	Omori Soya	Sato Tiger
Akiyama Kashin	—N/a	Akiyama; Kashin (9:31)	Akiyama; Kashin (11:09)	Akiyama; Kashin (7:47)	Omori; Soya (15:37)	Akiyama; Kashin (9:05)
Aoyagi Nomura	Akiyama; Kashin (9:31)	—N/a	Bodyguard; Zeus (16:39)	Doi; Kumagoro (12:33)	Omori; Soya (10:46)	Aoyagi; Nomura (9:32)
Bodyguard Zeus	Akiyama; Kashin (11:09)	Bodyguard; Zeus (16:39)	—N/a	Bodyguard; Zeus (11:16)	Omori; Soya (15:07)	Bodyguard; Zeus (18:15)
Doi Kumagoro	Akiyama; Kashin (7:47)	Doi; Kumagoro (12:33)	Bodyguard; Zeus (11:16)	—N/a	Omori; Soya (13:21)	Sato; Tiger (8:20)
Omori Soya	Omori; Soya (15:37)	Omori; Soya (10:46)	Omori; Soya (15:07)	Omori; Soya (13:21)	—N/a	Omori; Soya (8:21)
Sato Tiger	Akiyama; Kashin (9:05)	Aoyagi; Nomura (9:32)	Bodyguard; Zeus (18:15)	Sato; Tiger (8:20)	Omori; Soya (8:21)	—N/a

Final
A1	Jake Lee and Kento Miyahara	Pin
B1	Takao Omori and Manabu Soya	21:07

=== 2017 ===
The 2017 edition of the World Strongest Tag Determination League took place from November 19 through December 12.

Final standings
Wrestlers	Score
Shuji Ishikawa and Suwama	12
Daichi Hashimoto and Hideyoshi Kamitani	12
Kento Miyahara and Yoshitatsu	10
Yuma Aoyagi and Naoya Nomura	10
Jun Akiyama and Takao Omori	10
Joe Doering and Taiyo Kea	10
Bodyguard and Zeus	8
Black Tiger VII and Manabu Soya	6
Masakado and Ryoji Sai	6
Kai and Tajiri	6

Results	Akiyama Omori	Aoyagi Nomura	Tiger Soya	Bodyguard Zeus	Doering Kea	Hashimoto Kamitani	Ishikawa Suwama	Kai Tajiri	Masakado Sai	Miyahara Yoshitatsu
Akiyama Omori	—N/a	Aoyagi; Nomura (20:57)	Akiyama; Omori (7:11)	Bodyguard; Zeus (16:11)	Akiyama; Omori (10:11)	Akiyama; Omori (15:03)	Akiyama; Omori (6:44)	Kai; Tajiri (4:54)	Akiyama; Omori (11:01)	Miyahara; Yoshitatsu (19:36)
Aoyagi Nomura	Aoyagi; Nomura (20:57)	—N/a	Tiger; Soya (12:04)	Aoyagi; Nomura (12:06)	Aoyagi; Nomura (10:59)	Daichi; Kamitani (14:01)	Ishikawa; Suwama (20:32)	Aoyagi; Nomura (11:38)	Aoyagi; Nomura (10:42)	Miyahara; Yoshitatsu (21:38)
Tiger Soya	Akiyama; Omori (7:11)	Tiger; Soya (12:04)	—N/a	Bodyguard; Zeus (14:23)	Doering; Kea (13:15)	Daichi; Kamitani (12:31)	Ishikawa; Suwama (9:40)	Tiger; Soya (4:39)	Masakado; Sai (11:01)	Tiger; Soya (12:22)
Bodyguard Zeus	Bodyguard; Zeus (16:11)	Aoyagi; Nomura (12:06)	Bodyguard; Zeus (14:23)	—N/a	Doering; Kea (11:32)	Bodyguard; Zeus (12:59)	Ishikawa; Suwama (15:58)	Bodyguard; Zeus (3:36)	Masakado; Sai (11:45)	Miyahara; Yoshitatsu (19:35)
Doering Kea	Akiyama; Omori (10:11)	Aoyagi; Nomura (10:59)	Doering; Kea (13:15)	Doering; Kea (11:32)	—N/a	Daichi; Kamitani (8:20)	Doering; Kea (19:02)	Kai; Tajiri (2:25)	Doering; Kea (6:17)	Doering; Kea (16:10)
Hashimoto Kamitani	Akiyama; Omori (15:03)	Daichi; Kamitani (14:01)	Daichi; Kamitani (12:31)	Bodyguard; Zeus (12:59)	Daichi; Kamitani (8:20)	—N/a	Ishikawa; Suwama (19:38)	Daichi; Kamitani (3:50)	Daichi; Kamitani (9:41)	Daichi; Kamitani (25:03)
Ishikawa Suwama	Akiyama; Omori (6:44)	Ishikawa; Suwama (20:32)	Ishikawa; Suwama (9:40)	Ishikawa; Suwama (15:58)	Doering; Kea (19:02)	Ishikawa; Suwama (19:38)	—N/a	Kai; Tajiri (3:58)	Ishikawa; Suwama (16:29)	Ishikawa; Suwama (25:17)
Kai Tajiri	Kai; Tajiri (4:54)	Aoyagi; Nomura (11:38)	Tiger; Soya (4:39)	Bodyguard; Zeus (3:36)	Kai; Tajiri (2:25)	Daichi; Kamitani (3:50)	Kai; Tajiri (3:58)	—N/a	Masakado; Kai (4:05)	Miyahara; Yoshitatsu (21:38)
Masakado Sai	Akiyama; Omori (11:01)	Aoyagi; Nomura (10:42)	Masakado; Sai (11:01)	Masakado; Sai (11:45)	Doering; Kea (6:17)	Daichi; Kamitani (9:41)	Ishikawa; Suwama (16:29)	Masakado; Sai (4:05)	—N/a	Miyahara; Yoshitatsu (14:34)
Miyahara Yoshitatsu	Miyahara; Yoshitatsu (19:36)	Miyahara; Yoshitatsu (21:38)	Tiger; Soya (12:22)	Miyahara; Yoshitatsu (19:35)	Doering; Kea (16:10)	Daichi; Kamitani (25:03)	Ishikawa; Suwama (25:17)	Miyahara; Yoshitatsu (21:38)	Miyahara; Yoshitatsu (14:34)	—N/a

Final
Shuji Ishikawa and Suwama	Pin
Daichi Hashimoto and Hideyoshi Kamitani	11:14

=== 2018 ===
The 2018 edition of the World Strongest Tag Determination League took place from November 13 through December 11.

Final standings
Wrestlers	Score
Joe Doering and Dylan James	14
Jun Akiyama and Daisuke Sekimoto	12
Kai and Kengo Mashimo	12
Shuji Ishikawa and Suwama	12
Odinson and Parrow	12
Kento Miyahara and Yoshitatsu	10
Takao Omori and Manabu Soya	10
Zeus and The Bodyguard	8
Jake Lee and Ryoji Sai	8
Yuma Aoyagi and Naoya Nomura	6
Tajiri and Gianni Valletta	6

Results	Akiyama Sekimoto	Aoyagi Nomura	Doering James	Ishikawa Suwama	Kai Mashimo	Lee Sai	Miyahara Yoshitatsu	Odinson Parrow	Omori Soya	Tajiri Valletta	Zeus Bodyguard
Akiyama Sekimoto	—N/a	Akiyama; Sekimoto (14:32)	Doering; James (10:32)	Akiyama; Sekimoto (17:28)	Akiyama; Sekimoto (13:49)	Lee; Sai (20:33)	Akiyama; Sekimoto (23:40)	Akiyama; Sekimoto (8:48)	Omori; Soya (17:57)	Tajiri; Valletta (9:56)	Akiyama; Sekimoto (22:27)
Aoyagi Nomura	Akiyama; Sekimoto (14:32)	—N/a	Aoyagi; Nomura (4:59)	Ishikawa; Suwama (26:38)	Kai; Mashimo (20:11)	Aoyagi; Nomura (18:49)	Miyahara; Yoshitatsu (24:48)	Odinson; Parrow (4:10)	Omori; Soya (16:25)	Aoyagi; Nomura (10:28)	Zeus; Bodyguard (22:25)
Doering James	Doering; James (10:32)	Aoyagi; Nomura (4:59)	—N/a	Doering; James (18:52)	Doering; James (5:17)	Doering; James (6:40)	Miyahara; Yoshitatsu (19:04)	Doering; James (5:38)	Doering; James (12:18)	Tajiri; Valletta (4:50)	Doering; James (12:43)
Ishikawa Suwama	Akiyama; Sekimoto (17:28)	Ishikawa; Suwama (26:38)	Doering; James (18:52)	—N/a	Kai; Mashimo (21:15)	Lee; Sai (22:26)	Ishikawa; Suwama (24:13)	Ishikawa; Suwama (7:22)	Ishikawa; Suwama (17:40)	Ishikawa; Suwama (10:41)	Ishikawa; Suwama (23:37)
Kai Mashimo	Akiyama; Sekimoto (13:49)	Kai; Mashimo (20:11)	Doering; James (5:17)	Kai; Mashimo (21:15)	—N/a	Lee; Sai (11:18)	Kai; Mashimo (22:32)	Odinson; Parrow (8:31)	Kai; Mashimo (9:54)	Kai; Mashimo (6:12)	Kai; Mashimo (21:11)
Lee Sai	Lee; Sai (20:33)	Aoyagi; Nomura (18:49)	Doering; James (6:40)	Lee; Sai (22:26)	Lee; Sai (11:18)	—N/a	Miyahara; Yoshitatsu (26:42)	Odinson; Parrow (8:42)	Omori; Soya (14:09)	Lee; Sai (8:53)	Zeus; Bodyguard (18:54)
Miyahara Yoshitatsu	Akiyama; Sekimoto (23:40)	Miyahara; Yoshitatsu (24:48)	Miyahara; Yoshitatsu (19:04)	Ishikawa; Suwama (24:13)	Kai; Mashimo (22:32)	Miyahara; Yoshitatsu (26:42)	—N/a	Miyahara; Yoshitatsu (10:59)	Miyahara; Yoshitatsu (23:48)	Tajiri; Valletta (11:55)	Zeus; Bodyguard (23:16)
Odinson Parrow	Akiyama; Sekimoto (8:48)	Odinson; Parrow (4:10)	Doering; James (5:38)	Ishikawa; Suwama (7:22)	Odinson; Parrow (8:31)	Odinson; Parrow (8:42)	Miyahara; Yoshitatsu (10:59)	—N/a	Odinson; Parrow (10:28)	Odinson; Parrow (9:35)	Odinson; Parrow (9:10)
Omori Soya	Omori; Soya (17:57)	Omori; Soya (16:25)	Doering; James (12:18)	Ishikawa; Suwama (17:40)	Kai; Mashimo (9:54)	Omori; Soya (14:09)	Miyahara; Yoshitatsu (23:48)	Odinson; Parrow (10:28)	—N/a	Omori; Soya (9:25)	Omori; Soya (9:14)
Tajiri Valletta	Tajiri; Valletta (9:56)	Aoyagi; Nomura (10:28)	Tajiri; Valletta (4:50)	Ishikawa; Suwama (10:41)	Kai; Mashimo (6:12)	Lee; Sai (8:53)	Tajiri; Valletta (11:55)	Odinson; Parrow (9:35)	Omori; Soya (9:25)	—N/a	Zeus; Bodyguard (11:37)
Zeus Bodyguard	Akiyama; Sekimoto (22:27)	Zeus; Bodyguard (22:25)	Doering; James (12:43)	Ishikawa; Suwama (23:37)	Kai; Mashimo (21:11)	Zeus; Bodyguard (18:54)	Zeus; Bodyguard (23:16)	Odinson; Parrow (9:10)	Omori; Soya (9:14)	Zeus; Bodyguard (11:37)	—N/a

=== 2019 ===
The 2019 edition of the World Strongest Tag Determination League took place from November 11 through December 9.

Final standings
Wrestlers	Score
Shuji Ishikawa and Suwama	12
Jake Lee and Naoya Nomura	12
Kai and Tajiri	10
Joe Doering and Jun Akiyama	10
Zeus and Ryoji Sai	9
Takashi Yoshida and Gianni Valletta	8
Odinson and Parrow	8
Kento Miyahara and Yuma Aoyagi	8
Yoshitatsu and Joel Redman	8
Daisuke Sekimoto and The Bodyguard	3

Results	Akiyama Doering	Ishikawa Suwama	Kai Tajiri	Lee Nomura	Miyahara Aoyagi	Odinson Parrow	Sekimoto Bodyguard	Yoshida Valletta	Yoshitatsu Redman	Zeus Sai
Akiyama Doering	—N/a	Akiyama; Doering (13:55)	Kai; Tajiri (5:29)	Lee; Nomura (15:42)	Miyahara; Aoyagi (19:48)	Akiyama; Doering (7:31)	Akiyama; Doering (Forfeit)	DCO (9:41)	Akiyama; Doering (9:22)	Akiyama; Doering (15:37)
Ishikawa Suwama	Akiyama; Doering (13:55)	—N/a	Ishikawa; Suwama (2:24)	Ishikawa; Suwama (24:44)	Ishikawa; Suwama (25:42)	Ishikawa; Suwama (13:41)	Ishikawa; Suwama (18:08)	Ishikawa; Suwama (14:16)	Yoshitatsu; Redman (20:49)	Zeus; Sai (20:13)
Kai Tajiri	Kai; Tajiri (5:29)	Ishikawa; Suwama (2:24)	—N/a	Lee; Nomura (17:26)	Kai; Tajiri (18:09)	Odinson; Parrow (9:06)	Kai; Tajiri (Forfeit)	Yoshida; Valletta (7:48)	Kai; Tajiri (13:48)	Kai; Tajiri (6:10)
Lee Nomura	Lee; Nomura (15:42)	Ishikawa; Suwama (24:44)	Lee; Nomura (17:26)	—N/a	Lee; Nomura (17:28)	Lee; Nomura (13:56)	Lee; Nomura (Forfeit)	Lee; Nomura (12:04)	Yoshitatsu; Redman (10:53)	Zeus; Sai (18:54)
Miyahara Aoyagi	Miyahara; Aoyagi (19:48)	Ishikawa; Suwama (25:42)	Kai; Tajiri (18:09)	Lee; Nomura (17:28)	—N/a	Miyahara; Aoyagi (14:56)	Sekimoto; Bodyguard (23:29)	Yoshida; Valletta (13:26)	Miyahara; Aoyagi (18:24)	Miyahara; Aoyagi (23:31)
Odinson Parrow	Akiyama; Doering (7:31)	Ishikawa; Suwama (13:41)	Odinson; Parrow (9:06)	Lee; Nomura (13:56)	Miyahara; Aoyagi (14:56)	—N/a	Odinson; Parrow (8:29)	Odinson; Parrow (11:22)	Odinson; Parrow (12:20)	Zeus; Sai (8:04)
Sekimoto Bodyguard	Akiyama; Doering (Forfeit)	Ishikawa; Suwama (18:08)	Kai; Tajiri (Forfeit)	Lee; Nomura (Forfeit)	Sekimoto; Bodyguard (23:29)	Odinson; Parrow (8:29)	—N/a	Yoshida; Valletta (16:06)	Yoshitatsu; Redman (Forfeit)	Draw (30:00)
Yoshida Valletta	DCO (9:41)	Ishikawa; Suwama (14:16)	Yoshida; Valletta (7:48)	Lee; Nomura (12:04)	Yoshida; Valletta (13:26)	Odinson; Parrow (11:22)	Yoshida; Valletta (16:06)	—N/a	Yoshitatsu; Redman (8:47)	Yoshida; Valletta (15:23)
Yoshitatsu Redman	Akiyama; Doering (9:22)	Yoshitatsu; Redman (20:49)	Kai; Tajiri (13:48)	Yoshitatsu; Redman (10:53)	Miyahara; Aoyagi (18:24)	Odinson; Parrow (12:20)	Yoshitatsu; Redman (Forfeit)	Yoshitatsu; Redman (8:47)	—N/a	Zeus; Sai (13:12)
Zeus Sai	Akiyama; Doering (15:37)	Zeus; Sai (20:13)	Kai; Tajiri (6:10)	Zeus; Sai (18:54)	Miyahara; Aoyagi (23:31)	Zeus; Sai (8:04)	Draw (30:00)	Yoshida; Valletta (15:23)	Zeus; Sai (13:12)	—N/a

Final
1	Shuji Ishikawa and Suwama	Pin
2	Jake Lee and Naoya Nomura	19:45

=== 2020 ===
The 2020 edition of the World Strongest Tag Determination League, featured 8 teams in a single block, taking place from November 18 to December 7. The tournament featured outside participation from Big Japan Pro Wrestling's Daisuke Sekimoto and Abdullah Kobayashi and from Pro Wrestling Zero1's Masato Tanaka. On November 17, it was announced that Zeus had tested positive for coronavirus (COVID-19), leading him to pull out of the tournament and be replaced by his Purple Haze stablemate Izanagi.

Final standings
Wrestlers	Score
Kento Miyahara and Yuma Aoyagi	10
Suwama and Shuji Ishikawa	8
Jake Lee and Koji Iwamoto	8
Daisuke Sekimoto and Abdullah Kobayashi	8
Masato Tanaka and Tajiri	8
Yoshitatsu and Ryoji Sai	6
Shotaro Ashino and Kumaarashi	6
Izanagi and Shigehiro Irie	2

Results	Suwama Ishikawa	Izanagi Irie	Lee Iwamoto	Ashino Kumaarashi	Yoshitatsu Sai	Tanaka Tajiri	Sekimoto Kobayashi	Miyahara Aoyagi
Suwama Ishikawa	—N/a	Suwama; Ishikawa (11:48)	Suwama; Ishikawa (21:30)	Ashino; Arashi (15:48)	Yoshitatsu; Sai (17:59)	Suwama; Ishikawa (7:55)	Suwama; Ishikawa (14:27)	Miyahara; Aoyagi (24:17)
Izanagi Irie	Suwama; Ishikawa (11:48)	—N/a	Lee; Iwamoto (12:13)	Ashino; Arashi (11:17)	Yoshitatsu; Sai (9:52)	Tanaka; Tajiri (9:41)	Izanagi; Irie (10:24)	Miyahara; Aoyagi (13:00)
Lee Iwamoto	Suwama; Ishikawa (21:30)	Lee; Iwamoto (12:13)	—N/a	Lee; Iwamoto (16:19)	Lee; Iwamoto (13:20)	Tanaka; Tajiri (9:17)	Lee; Iwamoto (11:39)	Miyahara; Aoyagi (28:34)
Ashino Kumaarashi	Ashino; Arashi (15:48)	Ashino; Arashi (11:17)	Lee; Iwamoto (16:19)	—N/a	Yoshitatsu; Sai (11:02)	Tanaka; Tajiri (6:48)	Sekimoto; Kobayashi (11:06)	Ashino; Arashi (17:09)
Yoshitatsu Sai	Yoshitatsu; Sai (17:59)	Yoshitatsu; Sai (9:52)	Lee; Iwamoto (13:20)	Yoshitatsu; Sai (11:02)	—N/a	Tanaka; Tajiri (10:49)	Sekimoto; Kobayashi (13:09)	Miyahara; Aoyagi (22:56)
Tanaka Tajiri	Suwama; Ishikawa (7:55)	Tanaka; Tajiri (9:41)	Tanaka; Tajiri (9:17)	Tanaka; Tajiri (6:48)	Tanaka; Tajiri (10:49)	—N/a	Sekimoto; Kobayashi (9:05)	Miyahara; Aoyagi (13:59)
Sekimoto Kobayashi	Suwama; Ishikawa (14:27)	Izanagi; Irie (10:24)	Lee; Iwamoto (11:39)	Sekimoto; Kobayashi (11:06)	Sekimoto; Kobayashi (13:09)	Sekimoto; Kobayashi (9:05)	—N/a	Sekimoto; Kobayashi (18:42)
Miyahara Aoyagi	Miyahara; Aoyagi (24:17)	Miyahara; Aoyagi (13:00)	Miyahara; Aoyagi (28:34)	Ashino; Arashi (17:09)	Miyahara; Aoyagi (22:56)	Miyahara; Aoyagi (13:59)	Sekimoto; Kobayashi (18:42)	—N/a

=== 2021 ===
The 2021 edition of the World Strongest Tag Determination League, featured 16 teams in 4 blocks, taking place from November 13 to December 5.

Current standings
Block A		Block B		Block C		Block D	
Suwama and Shotaro Ashino	6	Kento Miyahara and Yuma Aoyagi	5	Kengo Mashimo and Kazma Sakamoto	6	Kumaarashi and Koji Doi	4
Abdullah Kobayashi and Drew Parker	4	T-Hawk and El Lindaman	3	Shuji Ishikawa and Kohei Sato	4	Koji Iwamoto and Ryuki Honda	3
Jake Lee and Hokuto Omori	2	Izanagi and Devil Murasaki II	0	Mitsuya Nagai and Leona	2	Zeus and Shigehiro Irie	3
Jun Saito and Rei Saito	0	Tajiri and Super Crazy	0	Yoshitatsu and Seigo Tachibana	0	Takao Omori and Isami Kodaka	2

Block A	Kobayashi Parker	Lee Omori	J. Saito R. Saito	Suwama Ashino
Kobayashi Parker	—N/a	Kobayashi; Parker (8:19)	Kobayashi; Parker (10:20)	Suwama; Ashino (7:42)
Lee Omori	Kobayashi; Parker (8:19)	—N/a	Lee; Omori (13:52)	Suwama; Ashino (16:07)
J. Saito R. Saito	Kobayashi; Parker (10:20)	Lee; Omori (13:52)	—N/a	Suwama; Ashino (13:32)
Suwama Ashino	Suwama; Ashino (7:42)	Suwama; Ashino (16:07)	Suwama; Ashino (13:32)	—N/a
Block B	T-Hawk Lindaman	Izanagi Murasaki	Miyahara Aoyagi	Tajiri Crazy
T-Hawk Lindaman	—N/a	DCO (10:27)	Draw (30:00)	T-Hawk; Lindaman (11:05)
Izanagi Murasaki	DCO (10:27)	—N/a	Miyahara; Aoyagi (14:02)	DCO (7:42)
Miyahara Aoyagi	Draw (30:00)	Miyahara; Aoyagi (14:02)	—N/a	Miyahara; Aoyagi (17:49)
Tajiri Crazy	T-Hawk; Lindaman (11:05)	DCO (7:42)	Miyahara; Aoyagi (17:49)	—N/a
Block C	Ishikawa Sato	Mashimo Sakamoto	Nagai Leona	Yoshitatsu Tachibana
Ishikawa Sato	—N/a	Mashimo; Sakamoto (13:50)	Ishikawa; Sato (11:27)	Ishikawa; Sato (9:55)
Mashimo Sakamoto	Mashimo; Sakamoto (13:50)	—N/a	Mashimo; Sakamoto (8:35)	Mashimo; Sakamoto (3:21)
Nagai Leona	Ishikawa; Sato (11:27)	Mashimo; Sakamoto (8:35)	—N/a	Nagai; Leona (10:03)
Yoshitatsu Tachibana	Ishikawa; Sato (9:55)	Mashimo; Sakamoto (3:21)	Nagai; Leona (10:03)	—N/a
Block D	Kumaarashi Doi	Iwamoto Honda	Omori Kodaka	Zeus Irie
Kumaarashi Doi	—N/a	Arashi; Doi (14:03)	Omori; Kodaka (12:30)	Arashi; Doi (12:39)
Iwamoto Honda	Arashi; Doi (14:03)	—N/a	Iwamoto; Honda (14:00)	Draw (30:00)
Omori Kodaka	Omori; Kodaka (12:30)	Iwamoto; Honda (14:00)	—N/a	Zeus; Irie (9:45)
Zeus Irie	Arashi; Doi (12:39)	Draw (30:00)	Zeus; Irie (9:45)	—N/a

Semifinals
A1	Suwama and Shotaro Ashino	Pin
D1	Kumaarashi and Koji Doi	10:09
B1	Kento Miyahara and Yuma Aoyagi	Pin
C1	Kengo Mashimo and Kazma Sakamoto	8:49

Finals
D1	Kumaarashi and Koji Doi	Sub
B1	Kento Miyahara and Yuma Aoyagi	27:24

=== 2022 ===
The 2022 edition of the World's Strongest Tag Determination League reverts back to the single-block format featuring 8 teams. The tournament takes place from November 13 to December 7. The tournament features outside participants from New Japan Pro-Wrestling's Yuji Nagata and Big Japan Pro Wrestling's Takuya Nomura. On November 25, it was announced that Shotaro Ashino would be absent for the remainder of the tournament, due to injury, leading to him and Ryuki Honda to forfeit the remainder of their matches.

Current standings
Wrestlers	Score
Kento Miyahara and Takuya Nomura	8
Shuji Ishikawa and Cyrus	8
Jake Lee and Yuma Aoyagi	7
Suwama and Kono	6
Jun Saito and Rei Saito	6
Kumaarashi and Koji Doi	6
Yuji Nagata and Yuma Anzai	6
Shotaro Ashino and Ryuki Honda	5

Results	Kumaarashi Doi	Ashino Honda	Ishikawa Cyrus	J. Saito R. Saito	Lee Aoyagi	Miyahara Nomura	Nagata Anzai	Suwama Kono
Kumaarashi Doi	—N/a	Arashi; Doi (10:26)	DCO (12:50)	Arashi; Doi (8:59)	Lee; Aoyagi (14:16)	Miyahara; Nomura (16:42)	Arashi; Doi (9:46)	Suwama; Kono (14:02)
Ashino Honda	Arashi; Doi (10:26)	—N/a	Ishikawa; Cyrus (forfeit)	J. Saito; R. Saito (forfeit)	Draw (30:00)	Ashino; Honda (18:43)	Nagata; Anzai (12:47)	Ashino; Honda (14:54)
Ishikawa Cyrus	DCO (12:50)	Ishikawa; Cyrus (forfeit)	—N/a	J. Saito; R. Saito (10:30)	Ishikawa; Cyrus (10:53)	Miyahara; Nomura (17:36)	Ishikawa; Cyrus (13:42)	Ishikawa; Cyrus (9:23)
J. Saito R. Saito	Arashi; Doi (8:59)	J. Saito; R. Saito (forfeit)	J. Saito; R. Saito (10:30)	—N/a	Lee; Aoyagi (10:00)	Miyahara; Nomura (11:59)	J. Saito; R. Saito (12:05)	Suwama; Kono (10:15)
Lee Aoyagi	Lee; Aoyagi (14:16)	Draw (30:00)	Ishikawa; Cyrus (10:53)	Lee; Aoyagi (10:00)	—N/a	Miyahara; Nomura (27:04)	Lee; Aoyagi (13:10)	DCO (14:31)
Miyahara Nomura	Miyahara; Nomura (16:42)	Ashino; Honda (18:43)	Miyahara; Nomura (17:36)	Miyahara; Nomura (11:59)	Miyahara; Nomura (27:04)	—N/a	Nagata; Anzai (20:17)	Suwama; Kono (16:43)
Nagata Anzai	Arashi; Doi (9:46)	Nagata; Anzai (12:47)	Ishikawa; Cyrus (13:42)	J. Saito; R. Saito (12:05)	Lee; Aoyagi (13:10)	Nagata; Anzai (20:17)	—N/a	Nagata; Anzai (12:49)
Suwama Kono	Suwama; Kono (14:02)	Ashino; Honda (14:54)	Ishikawa; Cyrus (9:23)	Suwama; Kono (10:15)	DCO (14:31)	Suwama; Kono (16:43)	Nagata; Anzai (12:49)	—N/a

Final
1	Kento Miyahara and Takuya Nomura	Pin
2	Shuji Ishikawa and Cyrus	20:37

=== 2023 ===
The 2023 edition of the World's Strongest Tag Determination League featured one single block with 10 teams. The tournament took place from November 12 to December 6. The tournament featured outside participants from DDT Pro-Wrestling's Yukio Sakaguchi and Hideki Okatani, JTO's Ren Ayabe, IWRG's Galeno del Mal and Gleat's Hayato Tamura.

Current standings
Wrestlers	Score
Katsuhiko Nakajima and Hokuto Omori	12
Hayato Tamura and Galeno del Mal	10
Suwama and Hideki Suzuki	10
Jun Saito and Rei Saito	10
Yuma Aoyagi and Kento Miyahara	9
Ryuki Honda and Yuma Anzai	9
Kuroshio Tokyo Japan and Seigo Tachibana	8
Yukio Sakaguchi and Hideki Okatani	8
Cyrus and Ryan Davidson	8
Shuji Ishikawa and Ren Ayabe	6

Results	J. Saito R. Saito	Aoyagi Miyahara	Honda Anzai	Suwama Suzuki	Ishikawa Ayabe	Sakaguchi Okatani	Tamura del Mal	Kuroshio Tachibana	Cyrus Davidson	Nakajima Omori
J. Saito R. Saito	—N/a	Aoyagi; Miyahara (15:19)	Honda; Anzai (14:42)	Suwama; Suzuki (17:41)	J. Saito; R. Saito (13:03)	J. Saito; R. Saito (10:26)	J. Saito; R. Saito (9:52)	J. Saito; R. Saito (10:41)	J. Saito; R. Saito (9:40)	Nakajima; Omori (18:03)
Aoyagi Miyahara	Aoyagi; Miyahara (15:19)	—N/a	Draw (30:00)	Suwama; Suzuki (14:46)	Aoyagi; Miyahara (11:20)	Aoyagi; Miyahara (15:46)	Tamura del Mal (20:13)	Aoyagi; Miyahara (13:07)	Cyrus; Davidson (22:02)	Nakajima; Omori (20:30)
Honda Anzai	Honda; Anzai (14:42)	Draw (30:00)	—N/a	Suwama; Suzuki (12:41)	Honda; Anzai (13:35)	Honda; Anzai (9:16)	Honda; Anzai (13:03)	Kuroshio; Tachibana (18:59)	Cyrus; Davidson (2:42)	Nakajima; Omori (9:52)
Suwama Suzuki	Suwama; Suzuki (17:41)	Suwama; Suzuki (14:46)	Suwama; Suzuki (12:41)	—N/a	Ishikawa; Ayabe (12:15)	Suwama; Suzuki (11:03)	Tamura del Mal (16:45)	Suwama; Suzuki (8:47)	Cyrus; Davidson (9:34)	Nakajima; Omori (16:57)
Ishikawa Ayabe	J. Saito; R. Saito (13:03)	Aoyagi; Miyahara (11:20)	Honda; Anzai (13:35)	Ishikawa; Ayabe (12:15)	—N/a	Sakaguchi; Okatani (11:38)	Ishikawa; Ayabe (11:26)	Kuroshio; Tachibana (10:51)	Cyrus; Davidson (10:14)	Ishikawa; Ayabe (12:09)
Sakaguchi Okatani	J. Saito; R. Saito (10:26)	Aoyagi; Miyahara (15:46)	Honda; Anzai (9:16)	Suwama; Suzuki (11:03)	Sakaguchi; Okatani (11:38)	—N/a	Sakaguchi; Okatani (10:52)	Kuroshio; Tachibana (11:10)	Sakaguchi; Okatani (7:59)	Sakaguchi; Okatani (14:15)
Tamura del Mal	J. Saito; R. Saito (9:52)	Tamura del Mal (20:13)	Honda; Anzai (13:03)	Tamura del Mal (16:45)	Ishikawa; Ayabe (11:26)	Sakaguchi; Okatani (10:52)	—N/a	Tamura del Mal (12:25)	Tamura del Mal (8:50)	Tamura del Mal (10:34)
Kuroshio Tachibana	J. Saito; R. Saito (10:41)	Aoyagi; Miyahara (13:07)	Kuroshio; Tachibana (18:59)	Suwama; Suzuki (8:47)	Kuroshio; Tachibana (10:51)	Kuroshio; Tachibana (11:10)	Tamura del Mal (12:25)	—N/a	Kuroshio; Tachibana (8:15)	Nakajima; Omori (13:29)
Cyrus Davidson	J. Saito; R. Saito (9:40)	Cyrus; Davidson (22:02)	Cyrus; Davidson (2:42)	Cyrus; Davidson (9:34)	Cyrus; Davidson (10:14)	Sakaguchi; Okatani (7:59)	Tamura del Mal (8:50)	Kuroshio; Tachibana (8:15)	—N/a	Nakajima; Omori (10:46)
Nakajima Omori	Nakajima; Omori (18:03)	Nakajima; Omori (20:30)	Nakajima; Omori (9:52)	Nakajima; Omori (16:57)	Ishikawa; Ayabe (12:09)	Sakaguchi; Okatani (14:15)	Tamura del Mal (10:34)	Nakajima; Omori (13:29)	Nakajima; Omori (10:46)	—N/a

=== 2024 ===
The 2024 edition of the World Strongest Tag Determination League featured 14 teams in 2 blocks, taking place from November 9 to December 8.

Current standings
Block A		Block B	
Jun Saito and Rei Saito	12	Kento Miyahara and Davey Boy Smith Jr.	10
Rising Hayato and Yuma Anzai	8	Ryuki Honda and Ren Ayabe	8
Daisuke Sekimoto and Kengo Mashimo	7	Cyrus and Hartley Jackson	6
Hokuto Omori and Kumaarashi	6	Yuma Aoyagi and Fuminori Abe	6
Makoto Oishi and Mike D Vecchio	4	Suwama and Hideki Suzuki	6
Musashi and Seiki Yoshioka	3	Hikaru Sato and Yuko Miyamoto	4
Shotaro Ashino and Dan Tamura	2	Kuroshio Tokyo Japan and Seigo Tachibana	2

Block A	J. Saito R. Saito	Musashi Yoshioka	Hayato Anzai	Ashino Tamura	Omori Kumaarashi	Sekimoto Mashimo	Oishi Vecchio
J. Saito R. Saito	—N/a	J. Saito; R. Saito (15:07)	J. Saito; R. Saito (25:44)	J. Saito; R. Saito (16:22)	J. Saito; R. Saito (19:22)	J. Saito; R. Saito (15:52)	J. Saito; R. Saito (11:40)
Musashi Yoshioka	J. Saito; R. Saito (15:07)	—N/a	Hayato; Anzai (12:38)	Musashi; Yoshioka (9:56)	Omori; Kumaarashi (8:44)	Draw (30:00)	Oishi; Vecchio (11:27)
Hayato Anzai	J. Saito; R. Saito (25:44)	Hayato; Anzai (12:38)	—N/a	Hayato; Anzai (12:36)	Omori; Kumaarashi (8:35)	Hayato; Anzai (13:17)	Hayato; Anzai (10:15)
Ashino Tamura	J. Saito; R. Saito (16:22)	Musashi; Yoshioka (9:56)	Hayato; Anzai (12:36)	—N/a	Omori; Kumaarashi (14:02)	Sekimoto; Mashimo (11:16)	Ashino; Tamura (10:27)
Omori Kumaarashi	J. Saito; R. Saito (19:22)	Omori; Kumaarashi (8:44)	Omori; Kumaarashi (8:35)	Omori; Kumaarashi (14:02)	—N/a	Sekimoto; Mashimo (12:52)	Oishi; Vecchio (8:49)
Sekimoto Mashimo	J. Saito; R. Saito (15:52)	Draw (30:00)	Hayato; Anzai (13:17)	Sekimoto; Mashimo (11:16)	Sekimoto; Mashimo (12:52)	—N/a	Sekimoto; Mashimo (6:43)
Oishi Vecchio	J. Saito; R. Saito (11:40)	Oishi; Vecchio (11:27)	Hayato; Anzai (10:15)	Ashino; Tamura (10:27)	Oishi; Vecchio (8:49)	Sekimoto; Mashimo (6:43)	—N/a
Block B	Miyahara Smith	Honda Ayabe	Kuroshio Tachibana	Cyrus Jackson	Suwama Suzuki	Aoyagi Abe	Sato Miyamoto
Miyahara Smith	—N/a	Honda; Ayabe (19:54)	Miyahara; Smith (22:12)	Miyahara; Smith (18:15)	Miyahara; Smith (20:46)	Miyahara; Smith (18:13)	Miyahara; Smith (20:29)
Honda Ayabe	Honda; Ayabe (19:54)	—N/a	Honda; Ayabe (12:10)	Cyrus; Jackson (11:37)	Suwama; Suzuki (15:36)	Honda; Ayabe (10:04)	Honda; Ayabe (10:29)
Kuroshio Tachibana	Miyahara; Smith (22:12)	Honda; Ayabe (12:10)	—N/a	Kuroshio; Tachibana (2:30)	Suwama; Suzuki (9:01)	Abe; Aoyagi (13:55)	Sato; Miyamoto (7:58)
Cyrus Jackson	Miyahara; Smith (18:15)	Cyrus; Jackson (11:37)	Kuroshio; Tachibana (2:30)	—N/a	Suwama; Suzuki (14:03)	Cyrus; Jackson (13:52)	Cyrus; Jackson (8:04)
Suwama Suzuki	Miyahara; Smith (20:46)	Suwama; Suzuki (15:36)	Suwama; Suzuki (9:01)	Suwama; Suzuki (14:03)	—N/a	Aoyagi; Abe (11:13)	Sato; Miyamoto (6:38)
Aoyagi Abe	Miyahara; Smith (18:13)	Honda; Ayabe (10:04)	Abe; Aoyagi (13:55)	Cyrus; Jackson (13:52)	Aoyagi; Abe (11:13)	—N/a	Aoyagi; Abe (11:03)
Sato Miyamoto	Miyahara; Smith (20:29)	Honda; Ayabe (10:29)	Sato; Miyamoto (7:58)	Cyrus; Jackson (8:04)	Sato; Miyamoto (6:38)	Aoyagi; Abe (11:03)	—N/a

Semifinals
A1	Jun Saito and Rei Saito	10:36
B2	Ryuki Honda and Ren Ayabe	Pin
B1	Kento Miyahara and Davey Boy Smith Jr.	11:26
A2	Rising Hayato and Yuma Anzai	Pin

Finals
Jun Saito and Rei Saito	Pin
Kento Miyahara and Davey Boy Smith Jr.	23:17

=== 2025 ===
The 2025 edition of the World Strongest Tag Determination League took place between November 22 and December 10. It featured the debuts of foreign wrestlers Xyon, Oddyssey, and Talos. On November 26, AJPW announced that Yuma Aoyagi would be suspended for three months after causing a traffic accident while driving with an expired license. As a result, he and partner Yuma Anzai forfeited the rest of their tournament matches.

Current standings
Block A		Block B	
Ren Ayabe and Talos	8	Xyon and Oddyssey	10
Hideki Suzuki and Kengo Mashimo	6	Kento Miyahara and Davey Boy Smith Jr.	8
Shotaro Ashino and Go Shiozaki	6	Ryuki Honda and Naoya Nomura	6
Hokuto Omori and Kumaarashi	4	Takashi and Kuroshio Tokyo Japan	4
Musashi and Seiki Yoshioka	4	Atsuki Aoyagi and Rising Hayato	4
Dan Tamura and Hikaru Sato	2	Yuma Aoyagi and Yuma Anzai	0

Block A	Suzuki Mashimo	Ayabe Talos	Ashino Shiozaki	Omori Kumaarashi	Musashi Yoshioka	Tamura Sato
Suzuki Mashimo	—N/a	Ayabe; Talos (12:59)	Suzuki; Mashimo (13:53)	Suzuki; Mashimo (11:08)	Musashi; Yoshioka (12:05)	Suzuki; Mashimo (9:30)
Ayabe Talos	Ayabe; Talos (12:59)	—N/a	Ayabe; Talos (18:00)	Ayabe; Talos (15:42)	Musashi; Yoshikoka (10:30)	Ayabe; Talos (14:31)
Ashino Shiozaki	Suzuki; Mashimo (13:53)	Ayabe; Talos (18:00)	—N/a	Shiozaki; Ashino (10:46)	Shiozaki; Ashino (21:11)	Shiozaki; Ashino (10:44)
Omori Kumaarashi	Suzuki; Mashimo (11:08)	Ayabe; Talos (15:42)	Shiozaki; Ashino (10:46)	—N/a	Omori; Kumaarashi (16:49)	Omori; Kumaarashi (11:12)
Musashi Yoshioka	Musashi; Yoshioka (12:05)	Musashi; Yoshikoka (10:30)	Shiozaki; Ashino (21:11)	Omori; Kumaarashi (16:49)	—N/a	Tamura; Sato (11:34)
Tamura Sato	Suzuki; Mashimo (9:30)	Ayabe; Talos (14:31)	Shiozaki; Ashino (10:44)	Tamura; Sato (11:34)	Omori; Kumaarashi (11:12)	—N/a
Block B	Xyon Oddyssey	Miyahara Smith	Y. Aoyagi Anzai	Honda Nomura	Takashi Kuroshio	A. Aoyagi Hayato
Xyon Oddyssey	—N/a	Xyon; Oddyssey (18:40)	Xyon; Oddyssey (forfeit)	Xyon; Oddyssey (11:19)	Xyon; Oddyssey (5:55)	Xyon; Oddyssey (14:45)
Miyahara Smith	Xyon; Oddyssey (18:40)	—N/a	Miyahara; Smith (forfeit)	Miyahara; Smith (14:39)	Miyahara; Smith (12:07)	Miyahara; Smith (14:14)
Y. Aoyagi Anzai	Xyon; Oddyssey (forfeit)	Miyahara; Smith (forfeit)	—N/a	Honda; Nomura (forfeit)	Takashi; Kuroshio (forfeit)	A. Aoyagi; Hayato (26:03)
Honda Nomura	Xyon; Oddyssey (11:19)	Miyahara; Smith (14:39)	Honda; Nomura (forfeit)	—N/a	Honda; Nomura (10:02)	Honda; Nomura (14:29)
Takashi Kuroshio	Xyon; Oddyssey (5:55)	Miyahara; Smith (12:07)	Takashi; Kuroshio (forfeit)	Honda; Nomura (10:02)	—N/a	A. Aoyagi; Hayato (10:47)
A. Aoyagi Hayato	Xyon; Oddyssey (14:45)	Miyahara; Smith (14:14)	A. Aoyagi; Hayato (26:03)	Honda; Nomura (14:29)	A. Aoyagi; Hayato (10:47)	—N/a

Final
A1	Ren Ayabe and Talos	Pin
B1	Xyon and Oddyssey	24:09

=== 2026 ===
The 2026 edition of the World Strongest Tag Determination League will take place between November 15 and December 6. It will feature the debuts of Hyo Ogawa and foreigners Timothy Thatcher and Cal Bloom.

Current standings
Block A		Block B	
Jun Saito and Rei Saito	0	Ren Ayabe and Talos	0
Xyon and Oddyssey	0	Yuma Aoyagi and Yuma Anzai	0
Suwama and Go Shiozaki	0	Hideki Suzuki and Timothy Thatcher	0
Kento Miyahara and Hyo Ogawa	0	Cal Bloom and Shotaro Ashino	0
Ryuki Honda and Masayuki Kono	0	Daisuke Sekimoto and Kengo Mashimo	0
Musashi and Seiki Yoshioka	0	Dan Tamura and Seigo Tachibana	0

Block A	J. Saito R. Saito	Xyon Oddyssey	Suwama Shiozaki	Miyahara Ogawa	Honda Kono	Musashi Yoshioka
J. Saito R. Saito	—N/a	Nov. 23	Nov. 15	Nov. 29	Nov. 22	Nov. 25
Xyon Oddyssey	Nov. 23	—N/a	Nov. 29	Nov. 15	Nov. 25	Nov. 28
Suwama Shiozaki	Nov. 15	Nov. 29	—N/a	Nov. 22	Nov. 26	Nov. 23
Miyahara Ogawa	Nov. 29	Nov. 15	Nov. 22	—N/a	Nov. 28	Nov. 21
Honda Kono	Nov. 22	Nov. 25	Nov. 26	Nov. 28	—N/a	Nov. 29
Musashi Yoshioka	Nov. 25	Nov. 28	Nov. 23	Nov. 21	Nov. 29	—N/a
Block B	Ayabe Talos	Aoyagi Anzai	Suzuki Thatcher	Bloom Ashino	Sekimoto Mashimo	Tamura Tachibana
Ayabe Talos	—N/a	Dec. 1	Nov. 22	Nov. 26	Nov. 15	Nov. 28
Aoyagi Anzai	Dec. 1	—N/a	Nov. 15	Nov. 28	Nov. 25	Nov. 22
Suzuki Thatcher	Nov. 22	Nov. 15	—N/a	Dec. 1	Nov. 21	Nov. 26
Bloom Ashino	Nov. 26	Nov. 28	Dec. 1	—N/a	Nov. 23	Nov. 21
Sekimoto Mashimo	Nov. 15	Nov. 25	Nov. 21	Nov. 23	—N/a	Dec. 1
Tamura Tachibana	Nov. 28	Nov. 22	Nov. 26	Nov. 21	Dec. 1	—N/a

Semifinals
A1
B2
B1
A2

Finals
