= No Fear (professional wrestling) =

Professional wrestling tag team

Tag team
- Members: Takao Omori; Yoshihiro Takayama; Satoru Asako
- Name(s): No Fear; Takao Omori and Yoshihiro Takayama
- Billed heights: 1.90 m (6 ft 3 in)- Omori; 2.01 m (6 ft 7 in)- Takayama
- Combined billed weight: 235 kg (518 lb)
- Hometown: Tokyo, Japan
- Debut: 1998
- Disbanded: 2002

No Fear was a professional wrestling tag team turned into a stable that initially consisted of Takao Omori and Yoshihiro Takayama, with Satoru Asako joining the group soon after its creation. During their history, the team competed in All Japan Pro Wrestling and Pro Wrestling Noah. The main three members of the group were Takao Omori, Yoshihiro Takayama and Satoru Asako. Along with those three members, the group would often have other wrestlers frequently team up with them as associates.

== History ==
=== All Japan Pro Wrestling (1998–2000) ===
No Fear formed in All Japan Pro Wrestling in the fall of 1998 as a subset of the "Triangle of Power" stable led by Gary Albright. The first highlight for the team was when Omori and Takayama participated in the 1998 World's Strongest Tag Determination League but they ended up finishing in last place with 2 points by only beating Albright and Giant Kimala. A few months later they teamed with Hiroshi Hase in a one night six-man tag team tournament where they made it to the semi-finals before losing to Mitsuharu Misawa, Yoshinari Ogawa, and Masahito Kakihara. After Albright left them, Omori and Takayama began slowly moving up the ranks over the next few months, with Junior Heavyweight veteran Satoru Asako becoming a member of the group in 1999. The would also receive back up from veterans Masanobu Fuchi and Hiroshi Hase, and a young up and coming Takeshi Morishima. No Fear won their first title on June 4, 1999, when they defeated Hayabusa and Jinsei Shinzaki to win the All Asia Tag Team Championship. One month later, on July 23, No Fear defeated Johnny Ace and Bart Gunn to win the World Tag Team Championship thus giving the team a monopoly on the All Japan tag team division. On August 25, No Fear lost both tag titles to Triple Crown Heavyweight Champion Mitsuharu Misawa and World Junior Heavyweight Championship Yoshinari Ogawa.

Three months later, on October 30, No Fear challenged Kenta Kobashi and Jun Akiyama for the World Tag Team Championship but lost. After that, they entered the 1999 World's Strongest Tag Determination League where they finished in 6th place with 4 points, by beating the team of Vader and Johnny Smith and the team of Gary Albright and Wolf Hawkfield. On June 9, 2000, No Fear entered a tournament for the vacant World Tag Team Championship. They defeated Misawa and Ogawa in the semi-finals but lost to The Holy Demon Army in the finals. Shortly afterwards, Misawa left All Japan to form Pro Wrestling Noah with No Fear (along with the majority of the native roster) following Misawa to Noah.

=== Pro Wrestling Noah (2000–2002) ===
No Fear debuted at Noah's first show, Pro Wrestling Noah Departure at Differ Ariake on August 5, 2000, as they teamed with Satoru Asako, who was the only member to stay on the team as both Fuchi and Hase remained in AJPW, and Morishima joined forces with Takeshi Rikio, in a six-man tag losing to Yoshinari Ogawa, Masahito Kakihara, & Daisuke Ikeda. On the second night of the event, Asako would defeat a rookie Kenta Kobayashi in a singles match. Omori and Takayama would be defeated that night by the Violence Bulldogs, Akira Taue and Jun Izumida. Much like in All Japan, in Noah No Fear would often compete at the top of the card, being a key main event level group in Noah's early years, with Omori, Takayama and Asako often competing in Main Event Tag Team and Six Man Tag Team Matches, scoring wins against Noah's top factions such as Mitsuharu Misawa's Wave, Kenta Kobashi's Burning and Jun Akiyama's Sternness. Brief dissension amongst the team would take place in late 2000 when Omori became irate at Takayama helping his arch rival Jun Akiyama in Tag Team matches against Kenta Kobashi and Burning, and a brief breakup would occur. As a result, Takao Omori would team up with Kenta Kobashi to face Yoshihiro Takayama and Jun Akiyama on the second night of Noah Navigation 2000. But this breakup would be revealed to be a ruse, with Omori betraying Kobashi by hitting him with his signature Axe Bomber, before Takayama defeated Kobashi with his signature Everest German Suplex, reestablishing No Fear as one of Noah's top stables. Despite the stable's heelish overtones, No Fear would often get strong babyface reactions, becoming a fan favorite team in Noah. During this time, Asako was also performing well in the Junior Heavyweight division when not teaming with No Fear in Tags and Six Man Tags. No Fear would also take part in the debut show for Pro Wrestling Zero1 on March 2, 2001, defeating Tatsuhito Takaiwa and Alexander Otsuka.

No Fear would continue building their momentum with a strong showing at Pro Wrestling Noah's first ever event at the historic Nippon Budokan, the ninth night of the Accomplish Our First Navigation Tour. In the first match of the night, Satoru Asako would team with semi frequent associate member Takashi Sugiura in a winning effort against Kentaro Shiga and Makoto Hashi of Sternness. Then in the semi main event of the evening, Takao Omori and Yoshihiro Takayama would defeat Takeshi Morishima and Takeshi Rikio of Wild II. Sadly in November of 2001, Asako would suffer a neck injury, which turned out to be career ending. He would return to have his retirement match in 2002. In 2001, Noah eventually started a tag team division and on December 9, No Fear defeated Mitsuharu Misawa and Yoshinari Ogawa to win the GHC Tag Team Championship. The team would hold the titles for 2 months before losing them to Morishima and Rikio on February 17, 2002. No Fear eventually broke up in 2002 with their last match ending in a no contest against Jun Akiyama and Yoshinobu Kanemaru on May 9 after Omori brutally hit Takayama with an Axe Bomber, betraying him.

=== Reunions (2011, 2013, 2016) ===
No Fear reunited the first time in nine years on August 27, 2011, at the New Japan, All Japan, Noah co-promoted show All Together losing to Jun Akiyama and Kensuke Sasaki. They reunited a second time on May 11, 2013, at Kenta Kobashi's retirement show Final Burning in Budokan where they defeated Minoru Suzuki and Naomichi Marufuji. On August 21, 2016, No Fear teamed for the final time at an All Japan/Land's End show defeating Suwama and Rikiya Fudo.

On May 4, 2017, Takayama suffered a career ending spinal cord injury during a match which left him paralyzed from the shoulders down, leaving Omori as the only former No Fear member still in active competition.

== Full Time Members ==
- Takao Omori (1998 – 2002)
- Yoshihiro Takayama (1998 – 2002)
- Satoru Asako (1999 – 2002)

== Associates ==
- Masanobu Fuchi (1999 – 2000)
- Hiroshi Hase (1999 – 2000)
- Takeshi Morishima (2000)
- Takashi Sugiura (2001 - 2002)

== Championships and accomplishments ==
- All Japan Pro Wrestling
  - All Asia Tag Team Championship (1 time)
  - World Tag Team Championship (1 time)
- Pro Wrestling Noah
  - GHC Tag Team Championship (1 time)
