= Roughly Obsess and Destroy =

Professional wrestling stable

Stable
- Members: See Members
- Debut: 2003

Roughly Obsess & Destroy (abbreviated in writing as RO&D, spoken as R.O.D.) was a professional wrestling stable founded in 2003 in All Japan Pro Wrestling (AJPW) by Taka Michinoku, disbanding in 2006, and later briefly reforming in Pro Wrestling Noah in 2007. Debuting in 2003 as an initially heel group of mostly gaijin wrestlers recruited by Taka Michinoku during his time working for World Wrestling Entertainment (WWE) in the United States, the group initially consisted of him, Gigantes and The Gladiator, but was composed primarily of him, Taiyo Kea, D'Lo Brown, Buchanan and Jamal throughout their peak.

With the introduction of the new heel Voodoo Murders unit in 2005, RO&D subsequently turned face and became popular with fans for their pre match promos and catchphrase, "R.O.D., boo-yah!". After they were defeated by the Voodoo Murders in a losing team disbands match on September 16, 2006, Taka disbanded the group, with the only remaining members at the time being himself and Kea, as RO'Z, Buchanan and D'Lo Brown had all defected to the Voodoo Murders.

Appearing at Pro Wrestling Noah's Nippon Budokan show on April 24, 2007, Taka announced his intention to revive the group in Noah, with himself, D'Lo Brown, Buchanan and Kazma Sakamoto as the new members. D'Lo and Buchanan briefly held the GHC Tag Team Championship in 2007, however, the group effectively disbanded again when Brown re-signed with WWE in June 2008. Brown returned to NOAH the following year, where he and Buchanan briefly used the RO&D name as a tag team.

== History ==
=== Original incarnation (2003–2006) ===
==== Formation and early years (2003–2004) ====
RO&D was initially formed in October 2003, as Taka Michinoku announced he would be forming a stable composed of himself and the strongest gaijin he knew of. Three names were initially considered for the group, these being "Yoshida-ya USA", "RAGD" (Rough and Greats Destroyers Crew), and the name the group finally came to be known as "RO&D" (Roughly Obsess & Destroy). The group's first two members were The Gladiator and Gigantes, later also recruiting D'Lo Brown, Buchanan, Justin Credible and Jamal in December; however, the group would be dealt a blow early in its life as Gigantes suddenly died in his hotel room while on tour on December 6.

In early 2004, Taka recruited a new member for the group, Hawaiian Taiyo Kea, unique to the other members in the sense that he was a gaijin, but was trained by and had spent his entire career up to that point in AJPW. Early in their run, the group primarily feuded with Keiji Muto, Kensuke Sasaki and his Kensuke Family group, Toshiaki Kawada, Satoshi Kojima and the rest of the babyface All Japan roster. The addition of Kea also saw the formation of a successful tag team between himself and Jamal, with the two combining to win the 2004 Worlds Strongest Tag Determination League, defeating KojiKaz (Satoshi Kojima and Kaz Hayashi) in the final and dedicating their victory to Gigantes.

==== Rise in popularity and face turn (2005) ====
At one point in early 2005, the group had a monopoly on all available championships in All Japan bar the Triple Crown, as Kea and Jamal held the World Tag Team Championship, Buchanan and Rico Constantino held the All Asia Tag Team Championship and Taka Michinoku held the World Junior Heavyweight Championship, the most successful period of the group's lifespan. Around this time, they began to gain popularity with fans for their catchphrase and pre and post match promos, showing signs of a full face turn, which was officially realised after the introduction of the rival Voodoo Murders stable. VM followed a similar theme to RO&D with heavy gaijin inclusion, however, their leader was the villainous Taru and the group were portrayed as much more ruthless heels, generating sympathy for RO&D and leading to their face turn. RO&D would feud with the group throughout 2005 as faces, with Taka later recruiting New Japan Pro Wrestling (NJPW)'s Masahiro Chono as a special one night member in July, and the group producing their own event, "RO&D Festival ~ Boo Ya! The World" in September.

==== Final success and first breakup (2006) ====
A brief dissension angle played out within the group between Kea and Brown in early 2006, which ended after Kea defeated Brown in a singles match in March, after which they reconciled. Kea achieved the group's greatest individual success soon after this, as he defeated Suwama to win the 2006 Champion Carnival in April and beat Satoshi Kojima in July to win the Triple Crown for the first time in his career. In June, Taka recruited RO'Z into the group, relative and tag team partner of former member Jamal, who had since returned to WWE. RO'Z's time in the group would be short lived, however, as he would abandon RO&D to join the Voodoo Murders on September 3. As the feud between the two groups began to reach its peak, a losing stable disbands match was organised for September 17 in Korakuen Hall, putting Taka, Kea, Buchanan & D'Lo against Taru, Suwama, Yasshi and RO'Z. During the match, Buchanan and D'Lo both abandoned Taka and Kea, turning heel once again and joining the Voodoo Murders in the process, allowing them to win and force RO&D to disband. The two would be aided by Keiji Muto and Kaz Hayashi, who helped them even the odds against the Voodoo Murders, after which Taka officially announced the disbandment of the group. He and Kea would remain face and begin fighting alongside Muto and the other members of the All Japan Army against the Voodoo Murders.

=== Second incarnation (2007–2009) ===
On April 24, 2007, Taka Michinoku appeared at Pro Wrestling Noah's event at Nippon Budokan and announced his intention to reform RO&D with himself, former members Bull Buchanan and D'Lo Brown and his trainee Kazma. The new RO&D debuted the following month in Korakuen Hall, as Taka, Buchanan and D'Lo defeated Go Shiozaki, Mohammed Yone and Takeshi Morishima. Taka's appearances would become more sporadic soon after this, while Buchanan and D’Lo continued to use the name as a tag team. They had their first chance for gold in Noah in June, where they unsuccessfully challenged Jun Akiyama and Takeshi Rikio for the GHC Tag Team Championship. In October, the two entered a tournament for the vacant championships, winning them by defeating Go Shiozaki and Akira Taue on October 16, however, they would lose the titles to Naomichi Marufuji and Takashi Sugiura a little over a week later. The two would continue to compete for Noah until Brown re-signed with WWE in June 2008. They briefly reunited the following year, and entered the Global Tag League, where they did not advance to the next stage. The group would essentially dissolve again after this.

== Members ==
- Taka Michinoku
- Taiyō Kea
- D'Lo Brown
- Buchanan
- Jamal
- Rico Constantino
- The Gladiator
- Gigantes
- Justin Credible
- Matt Morgan
- RO'Z
- KAZMA

== Championships and accomplishments ==
- All Japan Pro Wrestling

- All Asia Tag Team Championship (1 time) - Buchanan and Rico Constantino
- Triple Crown Heavyweight Championship (1 time) - Taiyō Kea
- World Junior Heavyweight Championship (1 time) - Taka Michinoku
- World Tag Team Championship (1 time) - Taiyō Kea and Jamal
- Champion Carnival (2006) - Taiyō Kea
- World's Strongest Tag Determination League (2004) - Taiyō Kea and Jamal
- January 2 Korakuen Hall Heavyweight Battle Royal (2004) - Jamal

- Hawai'i Championship Wrestling

- HCW Kekaulike Heritage Tag Team Championship (1 time) – Taiyō Kea and Jamal

- Kaientai Dojo

- Strongest-K Championship (1 time) - Taka Michinoku
- FMW/WEW Hardcore Tag Team Championship (1 time) – Taka Michinoku with Tomo Michinoku

- Michinoku Pro Wrestling

- Tohoku Junior Heavyweight Championship (1 time) - Taka Michinoku

- Pro Wrestling Noah

- GHC Tag Team Championship (1 Time) - D'Lo Brown and Buchanan
- Global Tag League Technique Prize (2008, 2009)- D'Lo Brown and Buchanan

- Tokyo Sports

- Technique Prize (2005) - Taka Michinoku
