= Holy Demon Army =

Professional wrestling tag team

Tag team
- Members: Toshiaki Kawada; Akira Taue
- Name: Holy Demon Army
- Billed heights: Kawada: 1.83 m (6 ft 0 in); Taue: 1.92 m (6 ft 3 1/2 in)
- Combined billed weight: 233 kg (514 lb)
- Debut: 1993
- Disbanded: 2000 (full time); 2009 (reunion match)

The Holy Demon Army (聖鬼軍, Seikigun) were a professional wrestling tag team consisting of Toshiaki Kawada and Akira Taue. The HDA competed in All Japan Pro Wrestling during the 1990s and is considered the most successful and dominant team in the history of All Japan as they held the World Tag Team Championship a record six times, as well as having won the World's Strongest Tag Determination League on two occasions.

== History ==
The Holy Demon Army first formed in 1993 after Kawada's team with Mitsuharu Misawa broke up and Taue's team with Jumbo Tsuruta ended when Tsuruta's full-time wrestling career ended due to Hepatitis B. The team was given their first shot at the World Tag Team Championship on May 20, 1993 against The Miracle Violence Connection. The Army was successful and won their first championship. The team held the titles for 3 1/2 months and made two successful title defenses against future nemeses: Misawa and Kenta Kobashi and a rematch against the Miracle Violence Connection before eventually losing the titles to Stan Hansen and Ted Dibiase on September 3, 1993. Two months later, The Holy Demon Army entered the 1993 World's Strongest Tag Determination League hoping to regain the Tag Team Titles (that were vacated with the tournament winners becoming the new champions), despite it being their first tournament, the HDA finished 3rd with 11 points while Misawa and Kobashi won.

A few months later on May 21, 1994, the Holy Demon Army were granted a title shot against Misawa and Kobashi; the match went over 40 minutes but the Army came up short. Despite failing to win the titles, Kawada enjoyed success winning the 1994 Champion Carnival on April 16, 1994. Six months later, on October 22, 1994, Kawada won the Triple Crown Heavyweight Championship from Steve Williams. After the Triple Crown victory, the Army entered the 1994 World's Strongest Tag Determination League but once again came in 3rd with Misawa and Kobashi winning for the second time.

On January 24, 1995, HDA got another title shot against Misawa and Kobashi but the match this time ended in a 60-minute time limit draw. Things got worse on March 4, 1995 when Kawada lost the Triple Crown to Stan Hansen leaving the Holy Demon Army with no gold. Despite the setbacks, HDA bounced back on June 9, 1995 when they defeated Misawa and Kobashi to win the tag team titles for the second time. After winning the titles, The Army made three successful title defenses, defeating Doug Furnas and Phil LaFon, Johnny Ace and The Patriot as well as wrestling Misawa and Kobashi to a 60-minute time limit draw. The team entered the 1995 World's Strongest Tag Determination League; they had their best outing yet as they ended up tying in first place with Misawa and Kobashi. The tie was settled on a final match to decide the winners of the tournament with Misawa and Kobashi winning for the third straight year.

Entering the new year, HDA lost the tag titles to Stan Hansen and Gary Albright on January 24, 1996. One month later, on February 20, 1996, the Holy Demon Army received a rematch and won the titles back for the third time. During their third reign, Taue won the 1996 Champion Carnival. On May 23, 1996 The Army lost the titles to Misawa and his new partner, Jun Akiyama. 48 hours later on May 25 however, Taue got revenge for the Army when he defeated Misawa to win the Triple Crown. After Taue lost the title to Kenta Kobashi on July 24, HDA resumed their team. They entered the 1996 World's Strongest Tag Determination League and after coming close the three previous years, the Army finally claimed their first Tag League by defeating Misawa and Akiyama in the finals.

Continuing their momentum, the Holy Demon Army defeated Johnny Ace and Steve Williams on January 17, 1997 to regain the title for the fourth time. On April 19, 1997, Kawada won his second Champion Carnival, but lost the tag titles to Kobashi and Ace on May 27, 1997. After the title loss, the Army wouldn't challenge for the rest of the year but entered the 1997 World's Strongest Tag Determination League and once again emerged victorious as they once again defeated Misawa and Akiyama in the finals.

On January 25, 1998, The Holy Demon Army won their fifth Tag Team Championship by defeating Kobashi and Ace. This title reign was the team's most successful as they held the title for over 11 months and made four successful title defenses in that time. During the title reign, the Army won more gold when Kawada defeated Misawa to win his second Triple Crown on May 1, 1998 at All Japan's first Tokyo Dome show but he would eventually lose the title one month later to Kenta Kobashi on June 12, 1998.

The Army lost the titles on January 7, 1999 to Kenta Kobashi and Jun Akiyama. Following the title loss, two weeks later on January 22, Kawada defeated Misawa out of nowhere to win his third Triple Crown; however during the match he broke his arm and would be forced to forfeit the championship on January 29. For the rest of 1999, HDA had a quiet year as they rarely teamed up as Kawada spent most of the year injured.

On June 9, 2000, the Holy Demon Army faced NO FEAR (Takao Omori and Yoshihiro Takayama) for the vacant World Tag Team Titles. The Army made history as they won their record-setting sixth tag team title. The title reign wouldn't last. On June 16, 2000, the Holy Demon Army was stripped of the titles when it was announced Taue would be one of many wrestlers that would leave All Japan and follow Mitsuharu Misawa to Misawa's new promotion: Pro Wrestling NOAH. Kawada would be one of three native talents (along with Hiroshi Hase and Masanobu Fuchi) to remain with All Japan. Now in different promotions, The Holy Demon Army were no more.

== Aftermath and Reunion ==
After breaking up, Kawada would continue to be a top star in All Japan winning the Triple Crown two more times and the Unified World tag Team Title once more with Taiyo Kea. In 2005, Kawada became a freelancer but would continue to wrestle for All Japan until 2008. After becoming a freelancer, he began wrestling various promotions including New Japan Pro-Wrestling where participated in the 2005 and 2008 G1 Climax, Pro Wrestling NOAH where he main evented the Destiny 2005 Tokyo Dome show wrestling Misawa one last time. He also began wrestling for HUSTLE and Pro Wrestling ZERO1. In HUSTLE he won the 2008 HUSTLE GP and in ZERO1 he won the World Heavyweight Championship in 2009.

Taue meanwhile, largely has phased himself out of the main event and into the midcard due to age and injuries. His only highlights include main eventing the first NOAH show on August 5, 2000 and having one reign with the GHC Heavyweight Championship in 2005. In 2009, following the death of Mitsuharu Misawa, Taue became president of Pro Wrestling NOAH.

On October 3, 2009, The Holy Demon Army reunited for one match at the Mitsuharu Misawa Osaka Memorial show. In the main event, the Army defeated Jun Akiyama and KENTA.

Having been inactive since August 2010, Kawada appeared at Taue's official retirement ceremony in December 2013, but only to greet him.

== Championships and accomplishments ==
- All Japan Pro Wrestling
  - Triple Crown Heavyweight Championship (4 times)- Kawada (3) & Taue (1)
  - World Tag Team Championship (6 Times)
  - World's Strongest Tag Determination League (1996, 1997)
  - Champion Carnival (1994, 1996, 1997)- Kawada (94, 97) Taue (96)
- Pro Wrestling Illustrated
  - PWI named them #8 of the best 100 tag teams of the "PWI Years" in 2003
- Wrestling Observer Newsletter
  - Wrestling Observer Newsletter Hall of Fame (Class of 2022)
- Tokyo Sports
  - Match of the Year (1995)- vs. Mitsuharu Misawa and Kenta Kobashi on June 9, 1995
  - Tag Team of the Year (1997)
