= World Tag Team Championship (AJPW) =

Professional wrestling tag team championship

Details
- Promotion: All Japan Pro Wrestling
- Date established: June 10, 1988
- Current champion: Saito Brothers (Jun Saito and Rei Saito)
- Date won: June 6, 2026

Other name
- AJPW World Tag Team Championship
Statistics
- First champions: Jumbo Tsuruta and Yoshiaki Yatsu
- Most reigns: As individual: Toshiaki Kawada (9); As team: Toshiaki Kawada and Akira Taue (6)
- Longest reign: Taiyō Kea and Minoru Suzuki (554 days)
- Shortest reign: Ashura Hara and Genichiro Tenryu (1 day)
- Oldest champion: Genichiro Tenryu (51 years, 5 months and 12 days)
- Youngest champion: Ryuki Honda (22 years, 4 months and 8 days)
- Heaviest champion: Akebono (462 lbs)

The World Tag Team Championship (世界タッグ王座, sekai taggu ōza) is a professional wrestling World tag team championship in Japanese promotion All Japan Pro Wrestling. It was created on June 10, 1988 as a unification of two previous tag team titles in All Japan; the PWF Tag Team Championship, and the NWA International Tag Team Championship; when the PWF champions Jumbo Tsuruta and Yoshiaki Yatsu defeated NWA champions The Road Warriors. As with the Triple Crown Heavyweight Championship, it is symbolized by four belts, two for each wrestler, representing the former PWF and NWA titles. It is currently the top of two tag team titles in AJPW, along with the secondary All Asia Tag Team Championship.

There have been a total of 104 reigns shared between 68 different teams consisting of 75 distinctive champions. The current champions are Saito Brothers (Jun Saito and Rei Saito) who are in their third reign as a team.

== Title history ==
Key
No.	Overall reign number
Reign	Reign number for the specific team—reign numbers for the individuals are in parentheses, if different
Days	Number of days held
Defenses	Number of successful defenses
+	Current reign is changing daily

No.	Champion	Championship change			Reign statistics			Notes	Ref.
No.	Champion	Date	Event	Location	Reign	Days	Defenses	Notes	Ref.
All Japan Pro Wrestling (AJPW)
1	Gorin Konbi (Jumbo Tsuruta and Yoshiaki Yatsu)	June 10, 1988	Super Power Series day 22	Tokyo, Japan	1	49	0	Tsuruta and Yatsu, the PWF Tag Team Champions, defeated NWA International champions The Road Warriors to unify the titles.	
2	Fuchin Gyorai (Terry Gordy and Stan Hansen)	July 29, 1988	Summer Action Series	Takasaki, Japan	1	2	0		
3	Gorin Konbi (Jumbo Tsuruta and Yoshiaki Yatsu)	July 31, 1988	Summer Action Series day 23 - Great kojika retirement	Hakodate, Japan	2	29	0		
4	Ryugenhou (Ashura Hara and Genichiro Tenryu)	August 29, 1988	Summer Action Series II day 6: Bruiser Brody Memorial Night in Budokan	Tokyo, Japan	1	1	0		
5	Gorin Konbi (Jumbo Tsuruta and Yoshiaki Yatsu)	August 30, 1988	Summer Action Series II day 7	Osaka, Japan	3	81	0		
—	Vacated	November 19, 1988	—	—	—	—	—	Vacated so the title could be decided in the World's Strongest Tag Determination League.	
6	Fuchin Gyorai (Terry Gordy and Stan Hansen)	December 16, 1988	World's Strongest Tag Determination League Day 23	Tokyo, Japan	2	51	0	Won the World's Strongest Tag Determination League.	
7	Gorin Konbi (Jumbo Tsuruta and Yoshiaki Yatsu)	February 2, 1989	WWA International Bash	Kansas City, Missouri, United States	4	159	7	Won the titles at a World Wrestling Alliance card.	
8	Ryukanhou (Stan Hansen and Genichiro Tenryu )	July 11, 1989	Summer Action Series day 7	Sapporo, Japan	1 (3, 2)	11	0		
9	Gorin Konbi (Jumbo Tsuruta and Yoshiaki Yatsu)	July 22, 1989	Summer Action Series day 15	Kanazawa, Japan	5	90	1		
10	Ryukanhou (Stan Hansen and Genichiro Tenryu)	October 20, 1989	October Series Series Day 15	Tokyo, Japan	2 (4, 3)	40	0		
—	Vacated	November 29, 1989	—	—	—	—	—	Vacated so the title could be decided in the World's Strongest Tag Determination League.	
11	Ryukanhou (Stan Hansen and Genichiro Tenryu)	December 6, 1989	World Strongest Tag Determination League Day 18	Tokyo, Japan	3 (5, 4)	90	0	Won the World's Strongest Tag Determination League.	
12	Satsujin Gyorai (Terry Gordy and Steve Williams)	March 6, 1990	Excite Series day 10	Tokyo, Japan	1 (3, 1)	135	1		
13	The Great Kabuki and Jumbo Tsuruta	July 19, 1990	Summer Action Series Day 11	Takefu, Japan	1 (1, 6)	8	0		
—	Vacated	July 30, 1990	—	—	—	—	—	Vacated due to Kabuki leaving AJPW for SWS.	
14	Satsujin Gyorai (Terry Gordy and Steve Williams)	December 7, 1990	World's Strongest Tag Determination League day 18	Tokyo, Japan	2 (4, 2)	132	2	Won the World's Strongest Tag Determination League.	
15	Stan Hansen and Danny Spivey	April 18, 1991	Champion Carnival day 22	Tokyo, Japan	1 (6, 1)	79	2		
16	Satsujin Gyorai (Terry Gordy and Steve Williams)	July 6, 1991	Summer Action Series day 1	Yokosuka, Japan	3 (5, 3)	18	0		
17	Toshiaki Kawada and Mitsuharu Misawa	July 24, 1991	Summer Action Series day 15	Kanazawa, Japan	1	135	1		
—	Vacated	December 6, 1991	—	—	—	—	—	Vacated so the title could be decided in the World's Strongest Tag Determination League.	
18	Satsujin Gyorai (Terry Gordy and Steve Williams)	December 6, 1991	World's Strongest Tag Determination League day 17	Tokyo, Japan	4 (6, 4)	89	0	Won the World's Strongest Tag Determination League.	
19	Akira Taue and Jumbo Tsuruta	March 4, 1992	Excite Series day 10	Tokyo, Japan	1 (1, 7)	254	2		
—	Vacated	November 13, 1992	—	—	—	—	—	Vacated so the title could be decided in the World's Strongest Tag Determination League.	
20	Toshiaki Kawada and Mitsuharu Misawa	December 4, 1992	World's Strongest Tag Determination League day 19	Tokyo, Japan	2	57	0	Won the World's Strongest Tag Determination League.	
21	Satsujin Gyorai (Terry Gordy and Steve Williams)	January 30, 1993	New Year Giant Series day 22	Chiba, Japan	5 (7, 5)	110	0		
22	The Holy Demon Army (Toshiaki Kawada and Akira Taue)	May 20, 1993	Super Power Series Day 6	Sapporo, Japan	1 (3, 2)	106	2		
23	Ted DiBiase and Stan Hansen	September 3, 1993	Summer Action Series II day 12	Tokyo, Japan	1 (1, 7)	71	1		
—	Vacated	November 13, 1993	—	—	—	—	—	Vacated so the title could be decided in the World's Strongest Tag Determination League.	
24	Kenta Kobashi and Mitsuharu Misawa	December 3, 1993	World's Strongest Tag Determination League day 18	Tokyo, Japan	1 (1, 3)	351	2	Won the World's Strongest Tag Determination League.	
—	Vacated	November 19, 1994	—	—	—	—	—	Vacated so the title could be decided in the World's Strongest Tag Determination League.	
25	Kenta Kobashi and Mitsuharu Misawa	December 10, 1994	World's Strongest Tag Determination League day 18	Tokyo, Japan	2 (2, 4)	181	2	Won the World's Strongest Tag Determination League.	
26	The Holy Demon Army (Toshiaki Kawada and Akira Taue)	June 9, 1995	Super Power Series day 15	Tokyo, Japan	2 (4, 3)	229	2		
27	Gary Albright and Stan Hansen	January 24, 1996	New Year Giant Series day 17	Matsumoto, Japan	1 (1, 8)	27	0		
28	The Holy Demon Army (Toshiaki Kawada and Akira Taue)	February 20, 1996	Excite Series day 3	Morioka, Japan	3 (5, 4)	93	1		
29	Jun Akiyama and Mitsuharu Misawa	May 23, 1996	Super Power Series day 5	Sapporo, Japan	1 (1, 5)	105	2		
30	Johnny Ace and Steve Williams	September 5, 1996	Summer Action Series II day 14	Tokyo, Japan	1 (1, 6)	134	1		
31	The Holy Demon Army (Toshiaki Kawada and Akira Taue)	January 17, 1997	New Year Giant Series day 11	Matsumoto, Japan	4 (6, 5)	130	1		
32	G.E.T. (Johnny Ace and Kenta Kobashi)	May 27, 1997	Super Power Series day 9	Sapporo, Japan	1 (2, 3)	59	0		
33	T.O.P. (Gary Albright and Steve Williams)	July 25, 1997	Summer Action Series day 21	Tokyo, Japan	1 (2, 7)	71	1		
34	G.E.T. (Johnny Ace and Kenta Kobashi)	October 4, 1997	October Giant Series day 6	Nagoya, Japan	2 (3, 4)	113	0		
35	The Holy Demon Army (Toshiaki Kawada and Akira Taue)	January 25, 1998	New Year Giant Series day 14	Yokohama, Japan	5 (7, 6)	347	4		
36	Jun Akiyama and Kenta Kobashi	January 7, 1999	New Year Giant Series tour.	Hidaka, Japan	1 (2, 5)	153	1		
37	Johnny Ace and Bart Gunn	June 9, 1999	Super Power Series tour.	Sendai, Japan	1 (4, 1)	44	0		
38	No Fear (Takao Omori and Yoshihiro Takayama)	July 23, 1999	Summer Action Series tour.	Tokyo, Japan	1	33	0	Also held the All Asia Tag Team Championship.	
39	Mitsuharu Misawa and Yoshinari Ogawa	August 25, 1999	Summer Action Series II tour	Hiroshima, Japan	1 (6, 1)	59	0	This was also for Omori and Takayama's All Asia title.	
40	Jun Akiyama and Kenta Kobashi	October 23, 1999	October Giant Series tour.	Nagoya, Japan	2 (3, 6)	120	2		
41	Vader and Steve Williams	February 20, 2000	Excite Series tour.	Kobe, Japan	1 (1, 8)	58	0		
—	Vacated	April 7, 2000	—	—	—	—	—	Vacated due to Vader fracturing his left arm.	
42	The Holy Demon Army (Toshiaki Kawada and Akira Taue)	June 9, 2000	Super Power Series tour	Tokyo, Japan	6 (8, 7)	7	0	Defeated Takao Omori and Yoshihiro Takayama in a tournament final.	
—	Vacated	June 16, 2000	—	—	—	—	—	Vacated due to Taue and several others leaving AJPW to form Pro Wrestling Noah.	
43	Taiyō Kea and Johnny Smith	January 14, 2001	New Year Giant Series tour	Tokyo, Japan	1	191	3	Defeated Masanobu Fuchi and Toshiaki Kawada.	
44	Yoji Anjo and Genichiro Tenryu	July 14, 2001	Summer Action Series tour.	Tokyo, Japan	1 (1, 5)	100	2		
45	Taiyō Kea and Keiji Muto	October 22, 2001	October Giant Series tour.	Niigata, Japan	1 (2, 1)	268	2	During this reign Taiyō Kea and Keiji Muto won the IWGP Tag Team Championship in a Winner takes all match where the AJPW Tag Team Championship was also on the line.	
46	KroniK (Brian Adams and Bryan Clark)	July 17, 2002	Summer Action Series tour.	Osaka, Japan	1	85	1		
—	Vacated	October 10, 2002	—	—	—	—	—	Vacated due to Adams becoming a professional boxer.	
47	Taiyō Kea and Satoshi Kojima	December 6, 2002	N/A	Tokyo, Japan	1 (3, 1)	153	0	Won the World's Strongest Tag Determination League.	
—	Vacated	May 8, 2003	—	—	—	—	—	Vacated due to inactivity.	
48	Arashi and Keiji Muto	June 8, 2003	Super Power Series tour	Yokohama, Japan	1 (1, 2)	224	4	Defeated Satoshi Kojima and Jimmy Yang in a tournament final.	
49	Kojikaz (Kaz Hayashi and Satoshi Kojima)	January 18, 2004	New Year Giant Series tour.	Osaka, Japan	1 (1, 2)	146	1		
50	Kendo Kashin and Yuji Nagata	June 12, 2004	Crossover tour.	Nagoya, Japan	1	188	0		
—	Vacated	December 12, 2004	—	—	—	—	—	Vacated due to inactivity.	
51	RO&D (Jamal and Taiyō Kea)	January 16, 2005	New Year Shining Series tour	Osaka, Japan	1 (1, 4)	323	3	Defeated Hiroshi Tanahashi and Yutaka Yoshie.	
—	Vacated	December 5, 2005	—	—	—	—	—	Vacated due to Jamal leaving AJPW for WWE.	
52	Toshiaki Kawada and Taiyō Kea	February 17, 2007	Pro Wrestling Love in Ryogoku vol. 2	Tokyo, Japan	1 (9, 5)	190	1	Defeated RO'Z and Suwama.	
53	Voodoo Murders (Satoshi Kojima and Taru)	August 26, 2007	Pro Wrestling Love in Ryogoku vol. 3	Tokyo, Japan	1 (3, 1)	130	0		
54	Joe Doering and Keiji Muto	January 3, 2008	New Year Shining Series tour.	Tokyo, Japan	1 (1, 3)	177	1		
55	Taiyō Kea and Minoru Suzuki	June 28, 2008	Crossover tour.	Osaka, Japan	1 (1, 6)	554	4		
56	Masakatsu Funaki and Keiji Muto	January 3, 2010	New Year Shining Series tour.	Tokyo, Japan	1 (1, 4)	65	0		
—	Vacated	March 9, 2010	—	—	—	—	—	Vacated due to Muto suffering a knee injury which required surgery.	
57	Taiyō Kea and Akebono	July 4, 2010	Crossover tour 2010	Osaka, Japan	1 (7, 1)	217	3	Defeated Suwama and Ryota Hama.	
58	Voodoo Murders (Joe Doering and Kono)	February 6, 2011	Excite Series 2011	Tokyo, Japan	1 (2, 1)	117	1		
—	Vacated	June 3, 2011	—	—	—	—	—	Vacated after AJPW suspended Kono.	
59	The Great Muta and Kenso	June 19, 2011	Pro-Wrestling Love In Ryogoku Vol. 12	Tokyo, Japan	1 (5, 1)	126	1	Defeated Akebono and Ryota Hama for the vacant titles.	
60	The Black Family (Dark Cuervo and Dark Ozz)	October 23, 2011	Pro-Wrestling Love In Ryogoku Vol. 13	Tokyo, Japan	1	149	2		
61	Get Wild (Manabu Soya and Takao Omori)	March 20, 2012	Pro-Wrestling Love In Ryogoku Vol. 14	Tokyo, Japan	1 (1, 2)	61	0		
62	Joe Doering and Seiya Sanada	May 20, 2012	AJPW 40th Anniversary Year Rise Up Tour 2012	Fukuoka, Japan	1 (3, 1)	28	0		
63	Get Wild (Manabu Soya and Takao Omori)	June 17, 2012	AJPW 40th Anniversary Year Cross Over 2012	Tokyo, Japan	2 (2, 3)	135	3		
—	Vacated	October 30, 2012	—	Tokyo, Japan	—	—	—	Vacated so the title could be decided in the 2012 World's Strongest Tag Determination League.	
64	Get Wild (Manabu Soya and Takao Omori)	November 30, 2012	AJPW 40th Anniversary World 's Strongest Tag Determination League 2012 tour	Tokyo, Japan	3 (3, 4)	107	2	Won the World's Strongest Tag Determination League, defeating Joe Doering and Suwama in the finals.	
65	Burning (Go Shiozaki and Jun Akiyama)	March 17, 2013	Pro-Wrestling Love In Ryogoku 2013 ~ Basic & Dynamic	Tokyo, Japan	1 (1, 4)	219	3		
66	Evolution (Suwama and Joe Doering)	October 22, 2013	AJPW Anniversary Tour 2013	Niigata, Japan	1 (1, 4)	249	4		
67	Wild Burning (Jun Akiyama and Takao Omori)	June 28, 2014	AJPW Dynamite Series 2014	Sapporo, Japan	1 (5, 5)	117	3		
—	Vacated	October 23, 2014	—	Tokyo, Japan	—	—	—	Vacated so the title could be decided in the 2014 World's Strongest Tag Determination League.	
68	Wild Burning (Jun Akiyama and Takao Omori)	December 6, 2014	AJPW Real World Tag League 2014	Tokyo, Japan	2 (6, 6)	106	2	Won the World's Strongest Tag Determination League, defeating Go Shiozaki and Kento Miyahara in the finals.	
69	Akebono and Yutaka Yoshie	March 22, 2015	AJPW Dream Power Series 2015	Fukuoka, Japan	1 (2, 1)	45	0		
70	Xceed (Go Shiozaki and Kento Miyahara)	May 6, 2015	AJPW Super Power Series 2015	Tokyo, Japan	1 (2, 1)	145	3		
—	Vacated	September 28, 2015	—	—	—	—	—	Vacated due to Shiozaki resigning from AJPW.	
71	The Big Guns (Bodyguard and Zeus)	December 23, 2015	Wrestle Dream	Osaka, Japan	1	175	2	Defeated Jun Akiyama and Takao Omori to win the vacant title.	
72	Daisuke Sekimoto and Yuji Okabayashi	June 15, 2016	2016 Dynamite Series	Tokyo, Japan	1	165	4		
73	The Big Guns (Bodyguard and Zeus)	November 27, 2016	Zen Nihon Puroresu in Ryōgoku Kokugikan	Tokyo, Japan	2	175	4		
74	Kai and Kengo Mashimo	May 21, 2017	2017 Super Power Series	Tokyo, Japan	1	21	0		
75	The Big Guns (Bodyguard and Zeus)	June 11, 2017	2017 Dynamite Series	Tokyo, Japan	3	36	1		
76	Nextream (Jake Lee and Naoya Nomura)	July 17, 2017	2017 Summer Action Series	Tokyo, Japan	1	15	1		
—	Vacated	August 1, 2017	—	—	—	—	—	Vacated due to Lee being sidelined with a knee injury.	
77	Daisuke Sekimoto and Yuji Okabayashi	August 27, 2017	2017 Summer Explosion	Tokyo, Japan	2	50	0	Defeated Kai and Naoya Nomura to win the vacant title.	
—	Vacated	October 16, 2017	—	—	—	—	—	Vacated due to Okabayashi suffering a shoulder injury.	
78	Wild Burning (Jun Akiyama and Takao Omori)	October 21, 2017	Jun Akiyama and Takao Omori Debut 25th Anniversary Show	Yokohama, Japan	3 (7, 7)	74	0	Defeated Daisuke Sekimoto and Ryuji Ito to win the vacant title.	
79	Suwama and Shuji Ishikawa	January 3, 2018	New Year Giant Series	Tokyo, Japan	1 (2, 1)	31	0		
80	Kento Miyahara and Yoshitatsu	February 3, 2018	Yokohama Twilight Blues Special 2018	Yokohama, Japan	1 (2, 1)	22	0		
81	The Big Guns (Bodyguard and Zeus)	February 25, 2018	2018 Excite Series	Osaka, Japan	4	28	0		
82	Dylan James and Ryoji Sai	March 25, 2018	2018 Power Dream Series	Saitama, Japan	1	97	1		
83	Violent Giants (Suwama and Shuji Ishikawa)	June 30, 2018	2018 Dynamite Series	Sapporo, Japan	2 (3, 2)	197	4		
84	Strong BJ (Daisuke Sekimoto and Yuji Okabayashi)	January 13, 2019	BJW To Was Gat Early	Tokyo, Japan	3	65	1	Won the titles at a Big Japan Pro Wrestling show.	
85	Violent Giants (Suwama and Shuji Ishikawa)	March 19, 2019	2019 Dream Power Series	Tokyo, Japan	3 (4, 3)	168	3		
86	Zeus and Ryoji Sai	September 3, 2019	2019 Summer Explosion	Tokyo, Japan	1 (5, 2)	121	1		
87	Violent Giants (Suwama and Shuji Ishikawa)	January 2, 2020	AJPW New Year Wars 2020	Tokyo, Japan	4 (5, 4)	366	5		
88	NEXTREAM (Kento Miyahara and Yuma Aoyagi)	January 2, 2021	AJPW New Year Wars 2021	Tokyo, Japan	1 (3, 1)	248	4		
89	Runaway Suplex (Shotaro Ashino and Suwama)	September 7, 2021	AJPW Super Deluxe Series	Tokyo, Japan	1 (1, 6)	249	3		
90	Twin Towers (Shuji Ishikawa and Kohei Sato)	May 14, 2022	AJPW Super Power Series	Sapporo, Japan	1 (5, 1)	36	1		
91	Gungnir of Anarchy (Shotaro Ashino and Ryuki Honda)	June 19, 2022	AJPW Champions Night 4: 50th Anniversary Tour	Tokyo, Japan	1 (2, 1)	126	4		
92	Voodoo Murders (Kono and Suwama)	October 23, 2022	AJPW Raising An Army Memorial Series 2022	Osaka, Japan	1 (2, 7)	71	0		
93	Kento Miyahara and Takuya Nomura	January 2, 2023	AJPW New Year Giant Series 2023	Tokyo, Japan	1 (4, 1)	20	0		
94	Yuma Aoyagi and Naoya Nomura	January 22, 2023	AJPW New Year Giant Series 2023	Tokyo, Japan	1 (2, 2)	58	0		
95	Kongo (Kenoh and Manabu Soya)	March 21, 2023	AJPW Dream Series 2023	Tokyo, Japan	1 (1, 4)	86	2		
96	Zen Nisshin Jidai (Kento Miyahara and Yuma Aoyagi)	June 15, 2023	AJPW Dynamite Series 2023	Tokyo, Japan	2 (5, 3)	116	3		
97	Saito Brothers (Jun Saito and Rei Saito)	October 9, 2023	AJPW Raising An Army Memorial Series 2023	Kakuda, Japan	1	125	4		
—	Vacated	February 11, 2024	—	—	—	—	—	Titles were vacated after Rei Saito suffered a shoulder injury.	
98	Hideki Suzuki and Suwama	February 25, 2024	AJPW Excite Series 2024	Kyoto, Japan	1 (1, 8)	34	1	Defeated Zen Nisshin Jidai (Kento Miyahara and Yuma Aoyagi) to win the vacant titles.	
99	Saito Brothers (Jun Saito and Rei Saito)	March 30, 2024	AJPW Dream Power Series 2024	Tokyo, Japan	2	344	8		
100	Business Tag Team (Kento Miyahara and Yuma Aoyagi)	March 9, 2025	AJPW Dream Power Series 2025	Tokyo, Japan	3 (6, 4)	147	3	Miyahara and Aoyagi previously teamed up under the tag names of Zen Nisshin Jidai and Nextream.	
101	Baka No Jidai (Hideki Suzuki and Kengo Mashimo)	August 3, 2025	AJPW Nettou Summer Action Wars 2025	Tokyo, Japan	1 (2, 2)	51	0		
102	Havoc (Odyssey and Xyon)	September 23, 2025	AJPW Giant Dream 2025	Tokyo, Japan	1	101	2		
103	Titans Of Calamity (Ren Ayabe and Talos)	January 2, 2026	AJPW New Year Wars 2026	Tokyo, Japan	1	155	3		
104	Saito Brothers (Jun Saito and Rei Saito)	June 6, 2026	AJPW Super Power Series 2026	Kakuda, Japan	3	169+	4		

== Combined reigns ==
As of November 22, 2026.

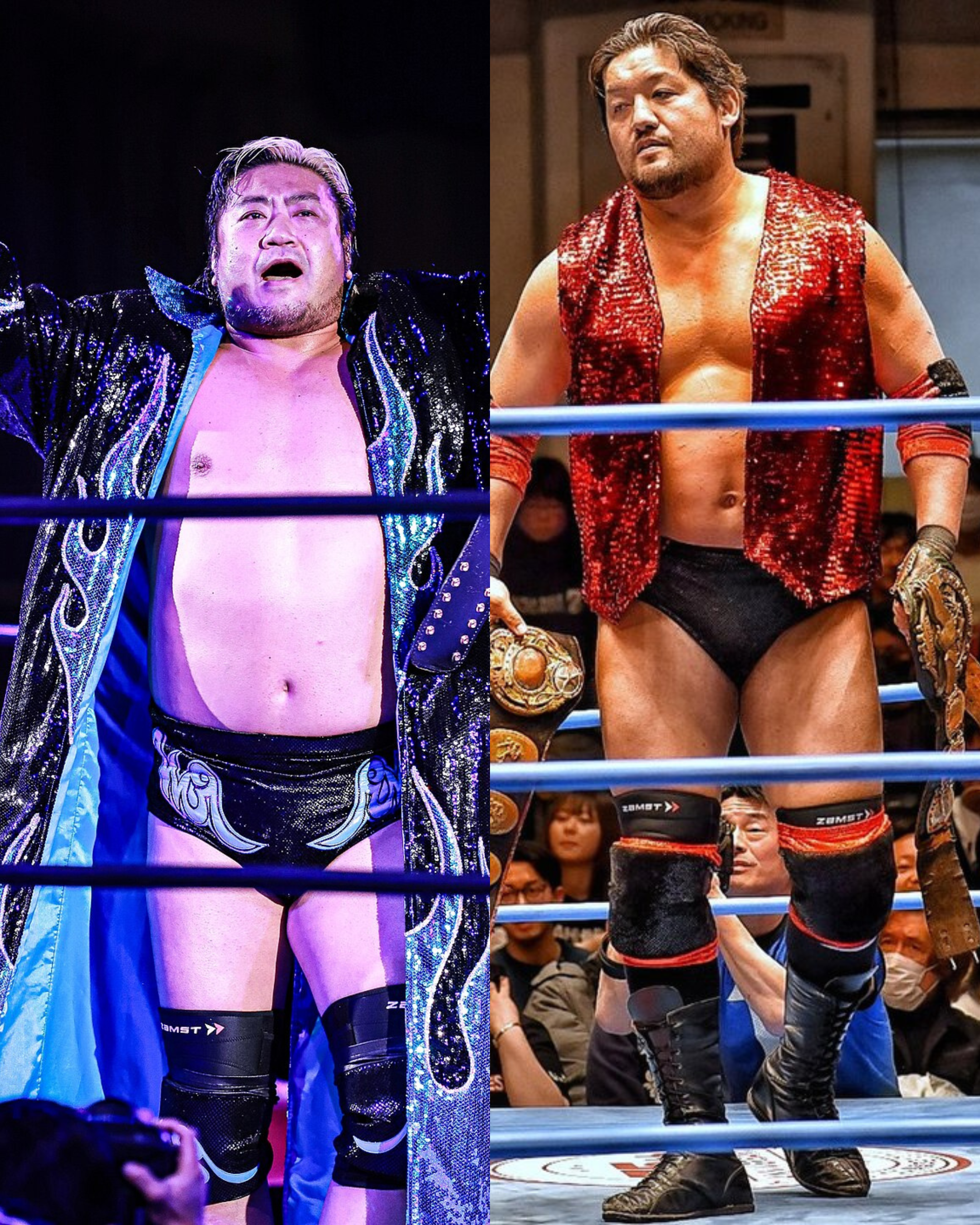
Four-time champions, Violent Giants (Suwama and Shuji Ishikawa)

†	Indicates the current champion

=== By team ===
Rank	Team	No. of reigns	Combined defenses	Combined days
1	The Holy Demon Army (Toshiaki Kawada and Akira Taue)	6	10	912
2	Violent Giants (Suwama and Shuji Ishikawa)	4	12	762
3	Saito Brothers † (Jun Saito and Rei Saito)	3	16	638+
4	Taiyō Kea and Minoru Suzuki	1	4	554
5	Kenta Kobashi and Mitsuharu Misawa	2	4	532
6	NEXTREAM/Zen Nisshin Jidai/Business Tag Team (Kento Miyahara and Yuma Aoyagi)	3	10	511
7	Satsujin Gyorai (Terry Gordy and Steve Williams)	5	3	484
8	The Big Guns (Bodyguard and Zeus)	4	7	414
9	Gorin Konbi (Jumbo Tsuruta and Yoshiaki Yatsu)	5	8	408
10	RO&D (Jamal and Taiyō Kea)	1	3	323
11	Get Wild (Manabu Soya and Takao Omori)	3	5	303
12	Wild Burning (Jun Akiyama and Takao Omori)	3	5	297
13	Daisuke Sekimoto and Yuji Okabayashi	3	5	280
14	Jun Akiyama and Kenta Kobashi	2	3	273
15	Taiyō Kea and Keiji Muto	1	2	268
16	Akira Taue and Jumbo Tsuruta	1	2	254
17	Evolution (Joe Doering and Suwama)	1	4	249
17	Runaway Suplex (Shotaro Ashino and Suwama)	1	3	249
19	Arashi and Keiji Muto	1	4	224
20	Burning (Go Shiozaki and Jun Akiyama)	1	3	219
21	Taiyō Kea and Akebono	1	3	217
22	Toshiaki Kawada and Mitsuharu Misawa	2	1	192
23	Taiyō Kea and Johnny Smith	1	3	191
24	Toshiaki Kawada and Taiyō Kea	1	1	190
25	Kendo Kashin and Yuji Nagata	1	0	188
26	Joe Doering and Keiji Muto	1	1	177
27	G.E.T. (Johnny Ace and Kenta Kobashi)	2	0	172
28	Titans Of Calamity (Ren Ayabe and Talos)	1	3	155
29	Taiyō Kea and Satoshi Kojima	1	0	153
30	The Black Family (Dark Cuervo and Dark Ozz)	1	2	149
31	Kojikaz (Kaz Hayashi and Satoshi Kojima)	1	1	146
32	Xceed (Go Shiozaki and Kento Miyahara)	1	3	145
33	Ryukanhou (Stan Hansen and Genichiro Tenryu)	3	0	141
34	Johnny Ace and Steve Williams	1	1	134
35	Voodoo Murders (Satoshi Kojima and Taru)	1	0	130
36	Gungnir Of Anarchy (Ryuki Honda and Shotaro Ashino)	1	4	126
36	The Great Muta and Kenso	1	1	126
38	Zeus and Ryoji Sai	1	1	121
39	Voodoo Murders (Joe Doering and Kono)	1	3	117
40	Jun Akiyama and Mitsuharu Misawa	1	2	105
41	Havoc (Odyssey and Xyon)	1	2	101
42	Yoji Anjo and Genichiro Tenryu	1	2	100
43	Dylan James and Ryoji Sai	1	1	97
44	Kongo (Kenoh and Manabu Soya)	1	2	86
45	KroniK (Brian Adams and Bryan Clark)	1	1	85
46	Stan Hansen and Danny Spivey	1	2	79
47	Ted DiBiase and Stan Hansen	1	1	71
47	Voodoo Murders (Kono and Suwama)	1	0	71
47	T.O.P. (Gary Albright and Steve Williams)	1	1	71
50	Masakatsu Funaki and Keiji Muto	1	0	65
51	Mitsuharu Misawa and Yoshinari Ogawa	1	0	59
52	Vader and Steve Williams	1	0	58
52	Yuma Aoyagi and Naoya Nomura	1	0	58
54	Baka No Jidai (Hideki Suzuki and Kengo Mashimo)	1	0	51
55	Fuchin Gyorai (Terry Gordy and Stan Hansen)	2	0	50
56	Akebono and Yutaka Yoshie	1	0	45
57	Johnny Ace and Bart Gunn	1	0	44
58	Twin Towers (Shuji Ishikawa and Kohei Sato)	1	1	36
59	Hideki Suzuki and Suwama	1	1	34
60	No Fear (Takao Omori and Yoshihiro Takayama)	1	0	33
61	Joe Doering and Seiya Sanada	1	0	28
62	Gary Albright and Stan Hansen	1	0	27
63	Kento Miyahara and Yoshitatsu	1	0	22
64	Kai and Kengo Mashimo	1	0	21
65	Kento Miyahara and Takuya Nomura	1	0	20
66	Nextream (Jake Lee and Naoya Nomura)	1	1	15
67	The Great Kabuki and Jumbo Tsuruta	1	0	8
68	Ryugenhou (Ashura Hara and Genichiro Tenryu)	1	0	1

=== By wrestler ===
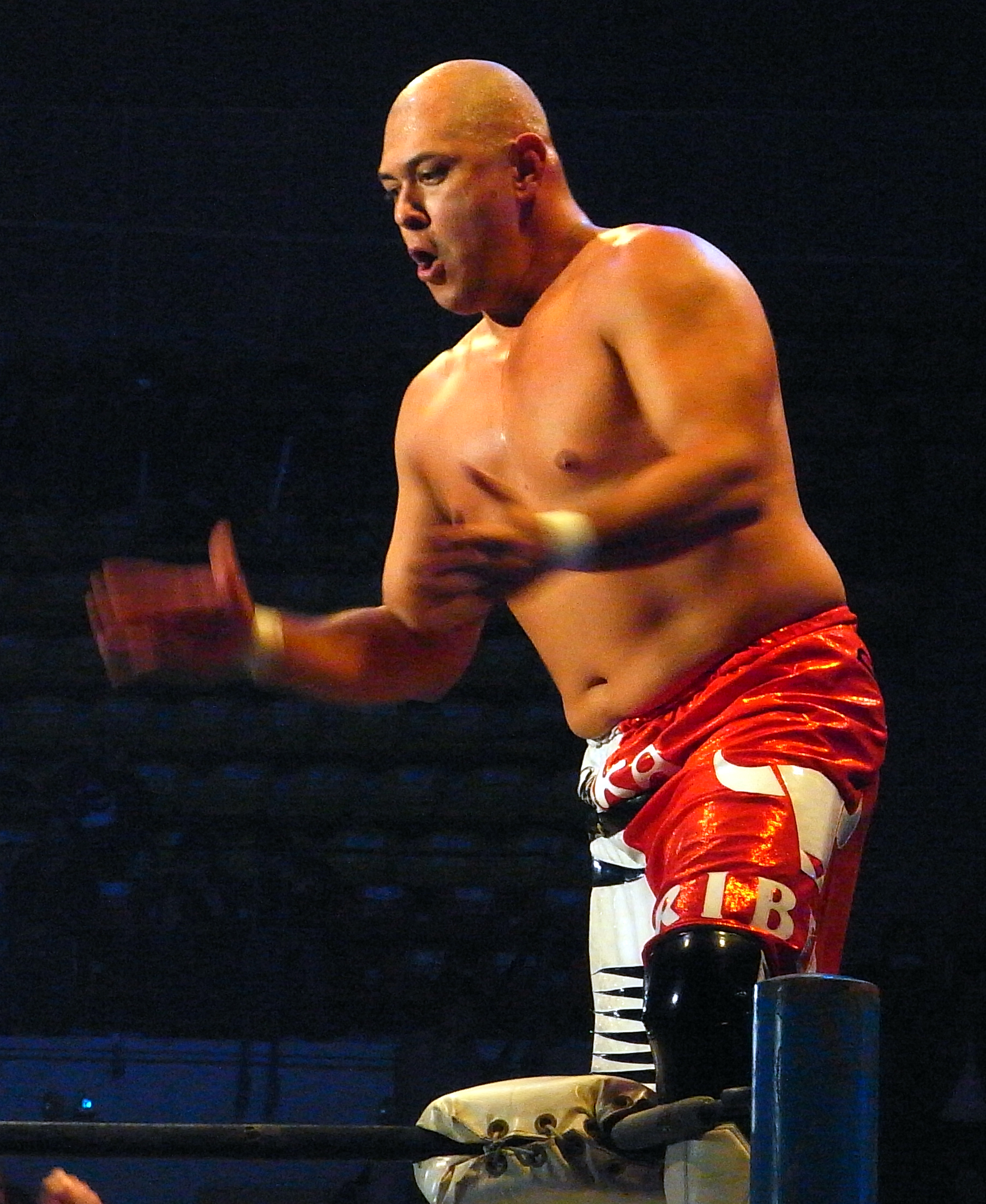
Taiyo Kea hold the record for most combined days as champion with 1896 days.

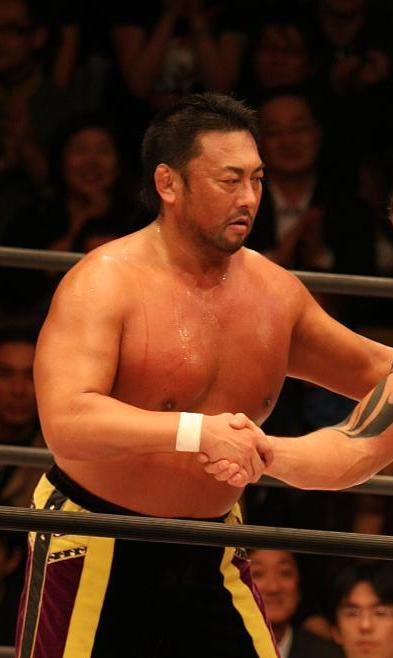
Toshiaki Kawada holds the record for most reigns as champion, with 9 reigns.

Rank	Wrestler	No. of reigns	Combined defenses	Combined days
1	Taiyō Kea	7	16	1,896
2	Suwama	8	20	1,365
3	Toshiaki Kawada	9	12	1,294
4	Akira Taue	7	12	1,166
5	Kenta Kobashi	6	7	977
6	Jun Akiyama	7	13	894
7	Mitsuharu Misawa	6	7	888
8	Keiji Muto/The Great Muta	5	8	860
9	Shuji Ishikawa	5	13	798
10	Steve Williams	8	5	747
11	Kento Miyahara	6	13	698
12	Jumbo Tsuruta	7	10	670
13	Jun Saito †	3	16	638+
13	Rei Saito †	3	16	638+
15	Takao Omori	7	11	633
16	Joe Doering	4	6	571
17	Yuma Aoyagi	4	10	569
18	Minoru Suzuki	1	4	554
19	Zeus	5	8	535
20	Terry Gordy	7	3	534
21	Satoshi Kojima	3	1	429
22	Bodyguard	4	7	414
23	Yoshiaki Yatsu	5	8	408
24	Manabu Soya	4	7	389
25	Shotaro Ashino	2	7	375
26	Stan Hansen	8	3	368
27	Go Shiozaki	2	6	364
28	Johnny Ace	4	1	350
29	Jamal	1	3	323
30	Daisuke Sekimoto	3	5	280
30	Yuji Okabayashi	3	5	280
32	Akebono	2	3	262
33	Genichiro Tenryu	5	2	242
34	Arashi	1	4	224
35	Ryoji Sai	2	2	218
36	Johnny Smith	1	3	191
37	Kono	2	1	188
37	Kendo Kashin	1	0	188
37	Yuji Nagata	1	0	188
40	Ren Ayabe	1	3	155
40	Talos	1	3	155
42	Dark Cuervo	1	2	149
42	Dark Ozz	1	2	149
44	Kaz Hayashi	1	1	146
45	Taru	1	0	130
46	Ryuki Honda	1	4	126
46	Kenso	1	1	126
48	Odyssey	1	2	101
48	Xyon	1	2	101
50	Yoji Anjo	1	2	100
51	Gary Albright	2	1	98
52	Dylan James	1	1	97
53	Kenoh	1	2	86
54	Hideki Suzuki	2	1	85
54	Brian Adams	1	1	85
54	Bryan Clark	1	1	85
57	Danny Spivey	1	2	79
58	Naoya Nomura	2	1	73
59	Kengo Mashimo	2	0	72
60	Ted DiBiase	1	1	71
61	Masakatsu Funaki	1	0	65
62	Yoshinari Ogawa	1	0	59
63	Vader	1	0	58
64	Yutaka Yoshie	1	0	45
65	Bart Gunn	1	0	44
66	Kohei Sato	1	1	36
67	Yoshihiro Takayama	1	0	33
68	Seiya Sanada	1	0	28
69	Yoshitatsu	1	0	22
70	Kai	1	0	21
71	Takuya Nomura	1	0	20
72	Jake Lee	1	1	15
73	The Great Kabuki	1	0	8
74	Ashura Hara	1	0	1

== See also ==
- Triple Crown Heavyweight Championship
- World Junior Heavyweight Championship
- All Asia Tag Team Championship
- PWF Tag Team Championship
- NWA International Tag Team Championship
