= Miracle Violence Connection =

Professional wrestling tag team

Tag team
- Members: Steve Williams; Terry Gordy
- Name(s): Miracle Violence Connection; Satsujin Gyorai; Super Dangerous Duo
- Billed heights: Steve Williams: 6 ft 1 in (1.85 m); Terry Gordy: 6 ft 4 in (1.93 m)
- Combined billed weight: 583 lb (264 kg)
- Debut: July 9, 1987
- Disbanded: August 12, 1987; July 29, 1993 (Full-Time); October 26, 1996

The Miracle Violence Connection were a professional wrestling tag team consisting of "Dr. Death" Steve Williams and Terry "Bam Bam" Gordy.

== History ==
=== Jim Crockett Promotions (1987) ===
The team originally formed on July 9, 1987, in Jim Crockett Promotions, defeating Dick Murdoch and Eddie Gilbert. They would wrestle six times together, all against Gilbert and Murdoch, winning every match but the last one, which Gilbert and Murdoch won, before disbanding. Gordy went to All Japan Pro Wrestling while Williams stayed for the transition from Bill Watts's old UWF into JCP, before moving to New Japan Pro Wrestling and then jumping to All Japan himself in 1990.

=== All Japan Pro Wrestling (1990–1993) ===
The team reunited in All Japan Pro Wrestling (AJPW) in February 1990 and quickly became a top tag team for the next several years under the name the Miracle Violence Connection. The two quickly found success when they defeated Genichiro Tenryu and Stan Hansen to win the World Tag Team Championship on March 6, 1990. Williams and Gordy would make one successful title defense against Hansen and Dan Spivey before losing the titles to Jumbo Tsuruta and the Great Kabuki on July 19, 1990. In the fall of 1990, the Miracle Violence Connection entered the World's Strongest Tag Determination League and would win the tournament by finishing in first with 19 Points. By winning the tournament, they also won the vacated World Tag Team Championship.

The team would hold the titles for four months, making two successful title defenses against Mitsuharu Misawa and Toshiaki Kawada and Jumbo Tsuruta and Akira Taue. The Connection's second title reign ended on April 18, 1991, at the Nippon Budokan to Stan Hansen and Dan Spivey. A few months later on July 6, Williams and Gordy rebounded by regaining the titles for the third time. The title reign would not last, three weeks later on July 24, they lost the titles to Misawa and Kawada.

Williams and Gordy entered their second Tag League in the fall of 1991 and would proceed to win the tournament for the second time by finishing in first with 21 Points. Along with the Tag Tournament the Miracle Violence Connection also won the vacated World Tag Team Titles for a fourth time. Four months later on March 4, 1992, they lost the titles to Jumbo Tsuruta and Akira Taue. For the remainder of 1992, Williams and Gordy attempted to regain the titles but failed to including a rematch with Tsuruta and Taue on October 7. The two also entered the 1992 World's Strongest Tag League but finished in second place with 17 points.

On January 30, 1993, the Miracle Violence Connection won their fifth and final World Tag Team Title by defeating Mitsuharu Misawa and Toshiaki Kawada. After holding the titles for 4 Months, Williams and Gordy would lose the titles to the newly formed Holy Demon Army (Toshiaki Kawada and Akira Taue). After failing to win the titles on July 26, Williams and Gordy would team one last time on July 29, 1993, defeating Johnny Ace and Kendall Windham. After the match, Gordy left All Japan breaking the Miracle Violence Connection up.

=== World Championship Wrestling (1992) ===
On February 29, 1992, at SuperBrawl II, then-WCW Executive Vice President Kip Frey announced that he was negotiating to bring Williams and Gordy back to World Championship Wrestling. On March 9, the duo defeated three enhancement teams at a television taping for The Main Event in Anderson, South Carolina in contests that would not air until May. On the April 18 edition of WCW Saturday Night it was announced that Williams and Gordy would be part of the upcoming tournament for the vacant NWA Tag-Team Championship that summer.

At Clash of the Champions XIX on June 16, the duo defeated the Australian representatives Larry O'Day and Jeff O'Day in the opening round of the NWA Tournament. As a bonus for the Clash, it was announced by new WCW Executive Vice President Bill Watts that the quarter-finals would begin later that night; as a result in a non-title match Williams and Gordy defeated WCW World Tag Team Champions the Steiner Brothers. While waiting for the next round to begin following the Clash, the duo would face and defeat Marcus Bagwell and Tom Zenk in house show matches. At Beach Blast 92 Williams and Gordy again faced the Steiner Brothers, this time going to a 30 minute draw. On July 5, 1992, at a house show at the Omni in Atlanta, Georgia, Williams and Gordy won the WCW World Tag Team Championship from the Steiner Brothers. Shortly afterwards at The Great American Bash 92 the final two rounds of the NWA Tag-Team Championship Tournament were run. Gordy and Williams defeated Ricky Steamboat and Nikita Koloff in the semi-finals, and then beat Dustin Rhodes and Barry Windham in the tournament final. Their NWA title win, however, went unrecognized by the NWA.

Steve Williams and Terry Gordy then began feuding with the Dangerous Alliance, defeating Bobby Eaton and Arn Anderson in house show matches. On the September 26th edition of the Main Event, the duo sustained their first televised defeat when they were beaten by The Steiner Brothers in a non-title matchup. On the October 3rd edition of WCW Saturday Night they were then upset by Dustin Rhodes and Barry Windham and lost both titles. This would mark the end of Terry Gordy's run in WCW; after the tandem returned to All-Japan in October 1992 for a lengthy series of matches only Steve Williams would make future appearances for WCW. Williams received a rematch at Halloween Havoc and chose Steve Austin as his partner, but were only able to wrestle Rhodes and Windham to a time limit draw. "Dr. Death" returned to the American promotion on December 12, 1992, and teamed with Big Van Vader in an unsuccessful challenge to Windham & Rhodes in Columbus, OH. On December 28 he participated in the Battle Bowl event at Starrcade and teamed with Sting to defeat Eric Watts and Jushin Liger. At the start of the event it was announced that he would be substituting for an injured Rick Rude to challenge Ron Simmons for the WCW World Heavyweight Championship, but lost by disqualification. He left WCW shortly thereafter.

During their relatively brief stay in WCW, their feud with the Steiner Brothers was also seen as a major feud by Japanese fans even though the two teams never faced each other in Japan. Despite advances by New Japan, Gordy and Williams, out of loyalty to Giant Baba, refused to compete for the rival promotion. In October 1992, Gordy left WCW, before Halloween Havoc, while Williams left in December, after Starrcade.

=== Extreme Championship Wrestling (1996) ===
Williams and Gordy briefly reunited in Extreme Championship Wrestling in late-1996, facing the Eliminators at When Worlds Collide and High Incident.

=== Legacy ===
Terry Gordy died on July 16, 2001, due to a heart attack. He was 40 years old.

In 2004, Williams was diagnosed with throat cancer; he would eventually get surgery and was declared cancer-free for five years until 2009 when his cancer returned. He eventually died on December 29, 2009. He was 49 years old.

== Championships and accomplishments ==
- All Japan Pro Wrestling
  - Triple Crown Heavyweight Championship (2 Times)-Terry Gordy
  - World Tag Team Championship (5 times)
  - World's Strongest Tag Determination League (1990, 1991)
- Pro Wrestling Illustrated
  - PWI Tag Team of the Year (1992)
  - PWI named them #16 of the 100 best tag teams during the "PWI Years"
- World Championship Wrestling
  - NWA World Tag Team Championship (1 time)
  - WCW World Tag Team Championship (1 time)
  - NWA World Tag Team Championship Tournament (1992)
- Wrestling Observer Newsletter
  - Tag Team of the Year (1992)
