= Yoshikazu Taru =

Japanese professional wrestler

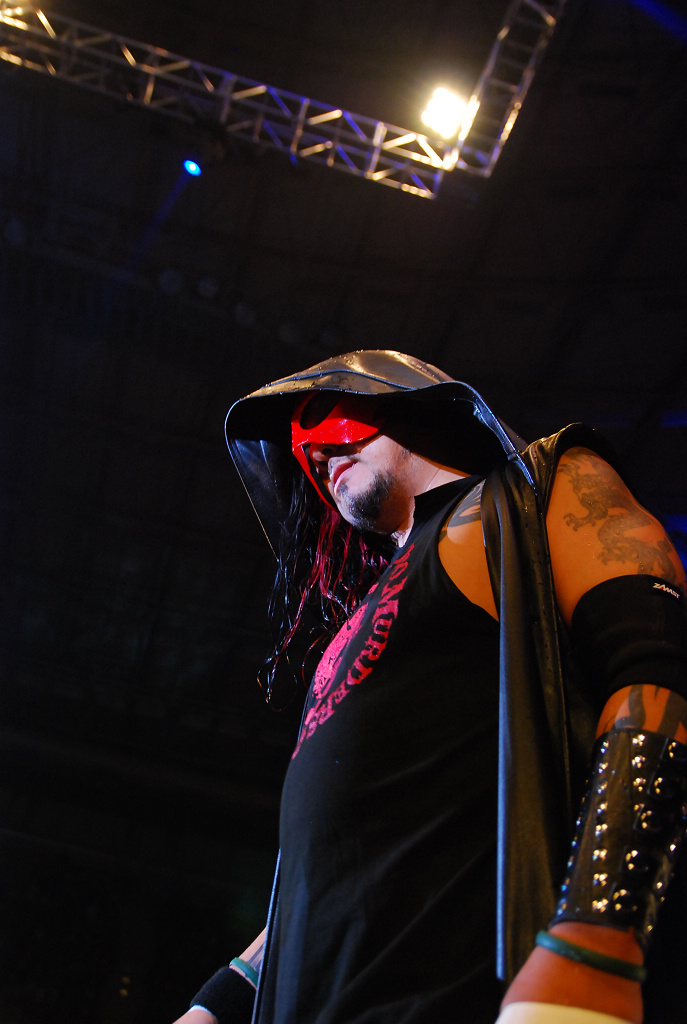
- TARU in 2009

Personal information
- Born: August 23, 1964 (age 62) Kobe City, Japan

Professional wrestling career
- Ring name(s): Fujiwara no Sumitomo; The Great Ruta; Taru; TarUltimo Dragon; Yoshikazu Taru
- Billed height: 1.83 m (6 ft 0 in)
- Billed weight: 111 kg (245 lb)
- Trained by: Koji Kitao
- Debut: 1996

Yoshikazu Taru (多留 嘉一, Taru Yoshikazu; born August 23, 1964) is a Japanese professional wrestler, better known simply as Taru (stylised in all capital letters). He is signed to Makai, while also working for Pro Wrestling Zero1 (Zero1) and All Japan Pro Wrestling (AJPW), where he is the leader of the Voodoo Murders. He also previously worked in Diamond Ring, Wrestle Association R (WAR) and Toryumon Japan, later known as Dragon Gate (DG).

== Professional wrestling career ==
Taru trained in professional wrestling from a karate background as part of Koji Kitao's Buko Dojo and started wrestling in 1996 for Wrestle Yume Factory, Wrestle Association R (WAR) and other independent promotions.

=== Wrestle Association R (1996–2008) ===
He debuted in WAR in December 1996 under his real name as part of Kitao's entourage. Like his partners, Taru wrestled in a modified karategi and utilized kicks and grappling holds in a shoot-style gimmick. Although he sometimes teamed up with Masaaki Mochizuki and Takashi Okamura, Taru wrestled mostly low level matches, having an on/off rivalry with Osamu Tachihikari and other beginners. In November 1998, as part of a working agreement between WAR and Último Dragón's Toryumon, Taru traveled to Mexico, where he took part in team matches along with the heel stable Crazy MAX (Shiima Nobunaga, Judo Suwa and Sumo Fujii). Around this time, Taru changed his gimmick away from his shoot-style roots, starting to use boots, leather bodysuits and more villainous traits. He never returned to WAR after his Mexican tenure, instead moving full-time to Toryumon.

=== Toryumon (1998–2004) ===
Taru's debut in the Japanese branch of Toryumon happened on February 3, 1998, where he participated along with Mochizuki, Okamura and Keiichi Kono in a special match between Buko Dojo members. About the end of the match, Crazy MAX came to the ring and attacked all the wrestlers except by Taru, whom they inducted officially into their stable. Through this way, Taru adopted his definitive role in Toryumon and became Crazy MAX's suave yakuza-like manager and mouthpiece. He would always be clad in tailored dark suits and wield a black-painted baseball bat which he would use to attack their enemies with. For many years they were a powerful faction in Toryumon Japan and Dragon Gate but the group dissolved on November 2, 2004, and Taru left the promotion.

=== All Japan Pro Wrestling (2005–2011) ===
After leaving Toryumon, Taru soon showed up in All Japan Pro Wrestling (AJPW), where he formed a tag team with Johnny Stamboli. After adding Chuck Palumbo, he created the stable Voodoo Murders and announced his plans to take over AJPW. This prompted them to clash with another villainous faction, Taka Michinoku and his group Roughly Obsess and Destroy (RO&D), causing them to feud for the next year. Taru recruited his former Toryumon enemies Shuji Kondo and Yasshi, as well as the superheavyweight Giant Bernard, and changed his yakuza outlook for a more bizarre, sinister cult leader image. Under this new character, he now used illegal tactics and weapons like garrotes and lead pipes, and often opted to grant himself disqualifications in the process of beating down opponents with the help of his stablemates.

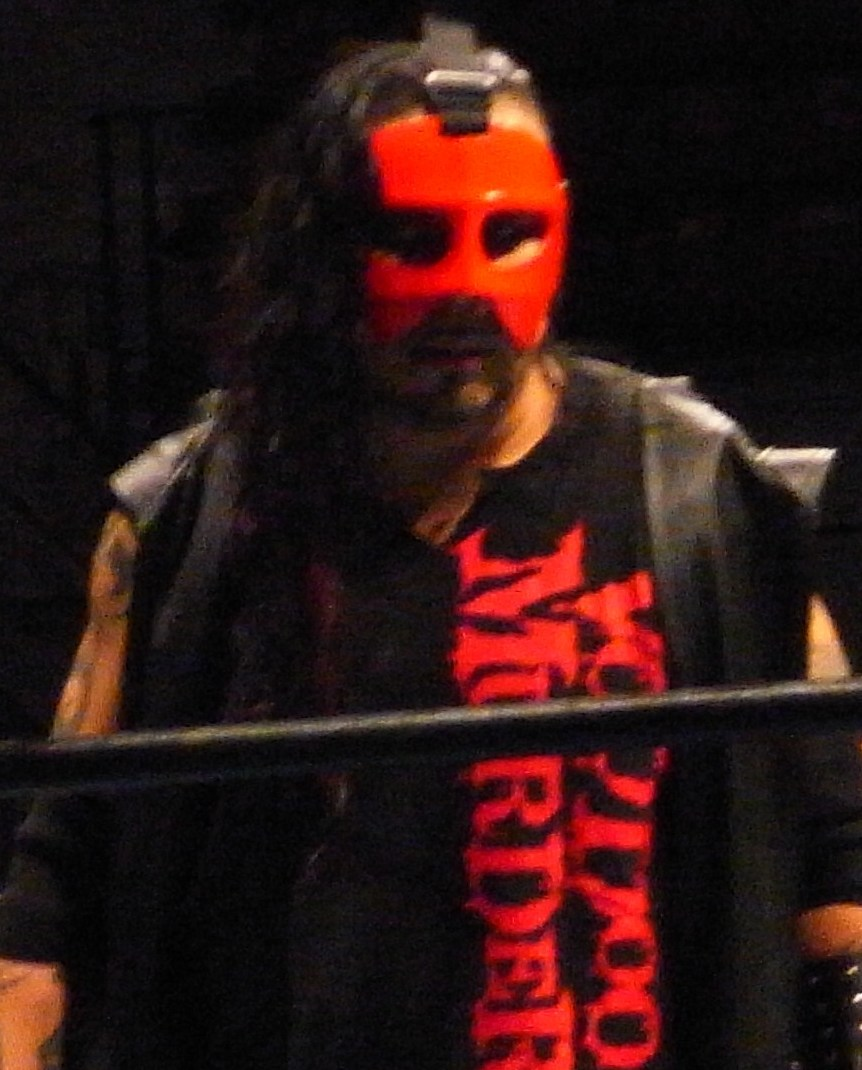
Taru in November 2010

The rivalry with RO&D ended in September 2006, when Taru and Michinoku agreed to a trios match where the loser should disband his stable. However, unbeknown to his opponent, Taru had secretly bought the loyalty of Michinoku's partners D'Lo Brown and Bull Buchanan, who betrayed RO&D in midst of the bout to give Voodoo Murders the final win. Taru and his group proceeded to beat down Taka until Keiji Mutoh and Kaz Hayashi made the save. As a consequence, Voodoo Murders left as AJPW's greatest heel faction, and Mutoh and his alliance of babyface wrestlers became their main opponents.

Taru wrestled one match against The Great Muta as The Great Ruta in November 2005. Taru challenged Satoshi Kojima for the Triple Crown on January 8, 2006. However, Kojima successfully defended his title. in July 2007, however, Kojima shocked the All-Japan roster when he turned on them and joined the Voodoo Murders, where he was quickly made the group's co-leader alongside Taru. Soon after joining, Kojima and Taru won the World Tag Team Championship. Along with Big Daddy Voodoo, he also won the All Asia Tag Team Championship.

On June 1, 2011, Taru was suspended indefinitely by AJPW after an alleged attack on stablemate Nobukazu Hirai leaving Hirai hospitalised with an acute hematoma. All Japan later also suspended Taru's stablemates Masayuki Kono, Mazada and Minoru for not attempting to stop Taru's assault on Hirai and immediately disbanded the Voodoo Murders, while the promotion's president Keiji Mutoh took the blame for the incident and resigned from his position on June 7. On June 30, TARU's suspension was upheld, while his former stablemates were allowed to return to action. Taru took a near two-year hiatus from professional wrestling after the incident.

=== Diamond Ring (2013–2015) ===
On January 22, 2013, announced that he would be returning to professional wrestling for the Diamond Ring promotion on February 11. Taru's return match, where he and Kazunari Murakami faced Kento Miyahara and Taishi Takizawa, ended in a no contest, following run-ins from "brother" Yasshi and Kengo Nishimura. Afterwards, Taru, Murakami, Yasshi and Nishimura, reforming the Voodoo Murders, were defeated in an eight-man tag team match by Miyahara, Takizawa, Satoshi Kajiwara and Mitsuhiro Kitamiya. After the match, Miyahara and Takizawa turned on their partners and joined the new Voodoo Murders, with Yasshi positioned as the leader. The new Voodoo Murders would decrease their appearances in Diamond Ring in favor of Pro Wrestling Zero1 (Zero1), where they moved to after the former promotion's demise.

=== Pro Wrestling Zero1 (2015–present) ===
Voodoo Murders would debut in Zero1 attacking Kamikaze and feuding with him. However, Kamikaze would then turn on his teammates and join Taru. Voodoo Murders then allied with Daemon Ueda's Daemon-gun, forming a super stable unofficially named VD-gun.

On January 3, 2015, AJPW announced that Taru would be returning to the promotion on January 31 to take part in Giant Baba's memorial event. This would mark his first match for the promotion in four years. In the match, Taru and Jinsei Shinzaki defeated Taiyō Kea and Yuto Aijima.

== Championships and accomplishments ==
- All Japan Pro Wrestling

- All Asia Tag Team Championship (1 time) – with Big Daddy Voodoo
- World Tag Team Championship (1 time) – with Satoshi Kojima

- Chō Hanabi Puroresu
  - Bakuha-ō Championship (2 times, current)
  - Bakuha-ō Tag Team Championship (1 time) – with Masato Tanaka
- International Wrestling Revolution Group

- World Lucha Libre Martial Arts Championship (1 time)

- Pro Wrestling Illustrated
  - PWI ranked him #298 of the top 500 singles wrestlers in the PWI 500 in 2003
- Pro Wrestling Zero1
  - NWA Intercontinental Tag Team Championship (2 times) – with Hartley Jackson (1) and Chris Vice (1)
- Tokyo Sports

- Tag Team Of The Year (2006) – with Suwama, Shuji Kondo, & "brother" YASSHI

- Toryumon Japan

- UWA World Trios Championship (1 time) – with CIMA and Big Fuji (Note: The UWA Closed in 1995, since then various UWA titles have been used by promotions in Mexico and Japan, this title was promoted by Toryumon Japan at the time TARU won it.)
- One Night Tag Tournament Winner (2002) – with SUWA
