= Masahito Kakihara =

Japanese professional wrestler

Masahito Kakihara 垣原賢人
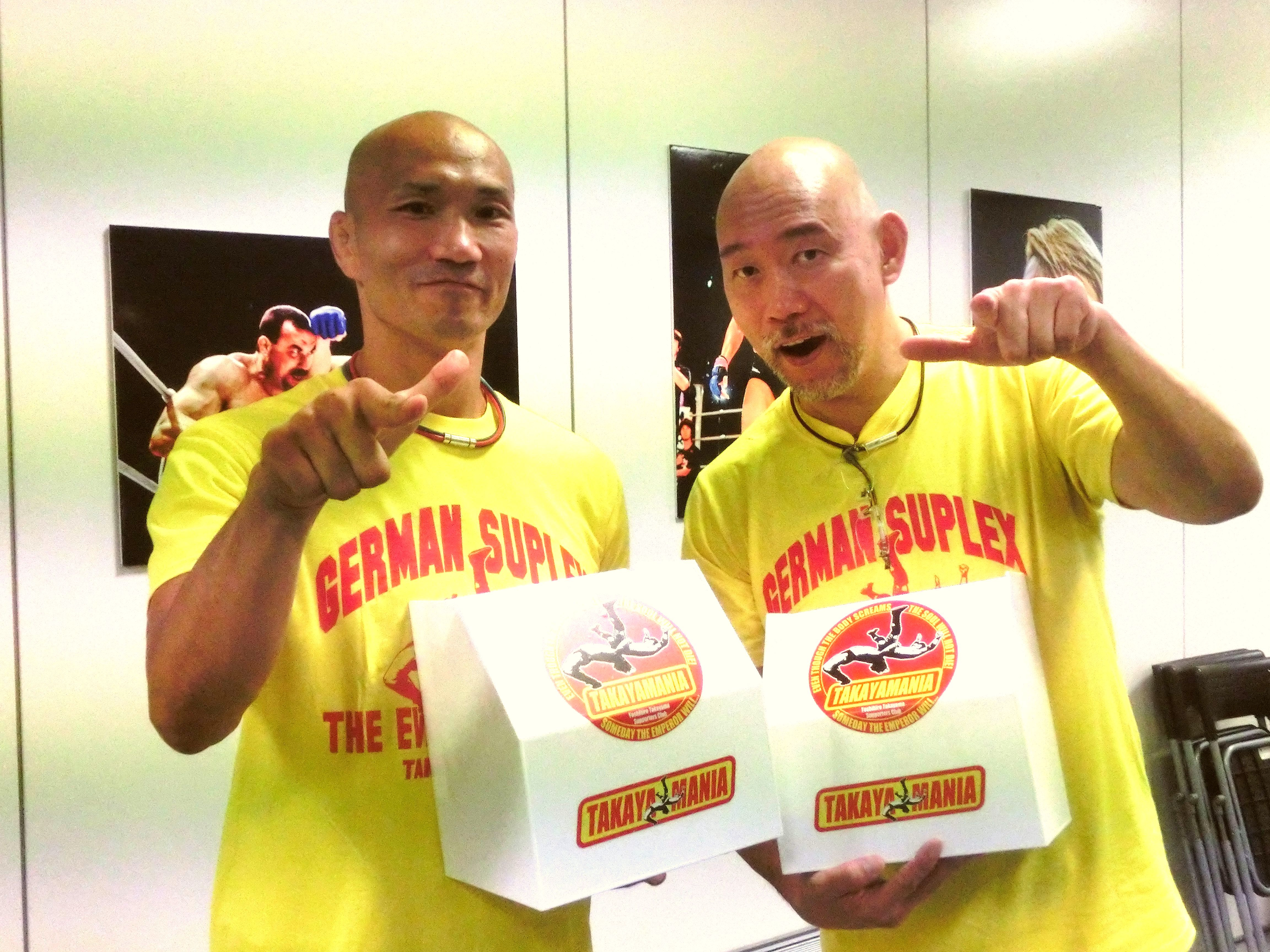
- Kakihara (left) with Kazuo Yamazaki (right) in 2018

Personal information
- Born: April 29, 1972 (age 54) Niihama, Ehime, Japan

Professional wrestling career
- Ring name(s): Masahito Kakihara; Miyama Mask
- Billed height: 6 ft 0 in (183 cm)
- Billed weight: 209 lb (95 kg)
- Trained by: Nobuhiko Takada
- Debut: August 31, 1990
- Retired: May 28, 2006

Masahito Kakihara (Japanese: 垣原 賢人, Kakihara Masahito; born April 29, 1972) is a Japanese former professional wrestler and mixed martial artist, who is known for his work in New Japan Pro-Wrestling (NJPW) and UWF International (UWFI).

== Professional wrestling career ==
=== Union of Wrestling Forces International (1991–1996) ===
Kakihara actually joined UWF Newborn in 1989 and debuted a year later, but the promotion folded shortly after. He then joined its new incarnation, UWF-i, where he became an apprentice under Nobuhiko Takada. A promising rookie, he was booked accordingly and soon had wins over Kiyoshi Tamura, Gary Albright and Dan Severn. In 1995, during the interpromotional feud between UWF-i and New Japan Pro-Wrestling, Kakihara was one of the few who were given victories in his side, defeating Kensuke Sasaki, Shinjiro Otani and Yuji Nagata. Later, when UWF-i started another feud with Wrestle Association R, Kakihara teamed up with Takada and Yuhi Sano to win the WAR World Six-Man Tag Team Championship. He also had an appearance in one of the first events of Battlarts, beating Satoshi Yoneyama. In 1996, UWF-i folded as well. He spent some time in the next incarnation, Kingdom Pro Wrestling, but it was short-lived.

=== All Japan Pro Wrestling (1998–2001) ===
Kakihara and his Kingdom partner Yoshihiro Takayama debuted in All Japan Pro Wrestling in 1998. They reunited with Gary Albright to form the second incarnation of the Triangle of Power stable, which would get into a feud with The Holy Demon Army, but they split up later when Takayama left to found No Fear with Takao Omori and Satoru Asako. Kakihara then joined Mitsuharu Misawa and his Untouchables faction, where he teamed up with Yoshinari Ogawa. Out of kayfabe, Misawa wanted Kakihara to be pushed as the second member of the group, but Giant Baba opposed, feeling Kakihara was too undersized and hadn't paid his dues with the promotion yet.

In 2000, Misawa, Kakihara and a large group of wrestlers left to form Pro Wrestling Noah, but he soon left the promotion because of a few personal problems with fellow wrestler Takao Omori. In his first and only match for NOAH, a six-man tag team match involving him, Yoshinari Ogawa and Daisuke Ikeda against Omori, Takayama and Satoru Asako on the promotion's first show, Kakihara appeared wearing mixed martial arts gloves and got in a scuffle with Omori, beating him down with stiff strikes. Immediately after Kakihara left, claiming he was interested in competing for Pride Fighting Championships like several of his fellow shoot-style wrestlers. However, he instead returned as a freelancer to AJPW, where the Noah exodus had left new chances. He joined another shoot-stylist, Mitsuya Nagai, and they won the vacant All Asia Tag Team Championship against Yuji Nagata and Shinya Makabe. Their reign would be short, as Masahito suffered a knee injury and was forced to vacate the titles again. He didn't return to AJPW when he recovered.

=== New Japan Pro-Wrestling (2001–2006) ===
In 2001, Kakihara debuted for New Japan Pro-Wrestling. Upon his arrival, he formed an occasional alliance with two other shoot-style users, Masayuki Naruse and Minoru Tanaka. Tanaka and him competed for the vacant IWGP Junior Heavyweight Championship, but Kakihara was defeated. He spent the rest of his tenure as a midcarder, until in 2003 Kakihara shockingly won the Best Of The Super Junior X. However, his persistent injury impeded any lasting push he might have received. He seemed to recover his momentum at the Best Of The Super Junior XI, but he was defeated at the very finals by Heat. Around this time, he also started competing in Kiyoshi Tamura's promotion U-style. He ended 2004 teaming with Takashi Iizuka to challenge two of Kakihara's former allies, Naruse and Nagai, for the very title Kakihara had gained in AJPW with the latter, the All Asia Tag Team Championship; however, Kakihara and Iizuka failed.

Kakihara bounced around the roster for two more years, until in 2006 he announced his retirement from professional wrestling due to a spinal injury.

== Championships and accomplishments ==
- All Japan Pro Wrestling
  - All Asia Tag Team Championship (1 time) - with Mitsuya Nagai
- New Japan Pro-Wrestling
  - G1 Jr. 6 Man Tag Team Tournament (2001) - with Minoru Tanaka and Masayuki Naruse
  - Best of the Super Juniors (2003)
  - New Japan Rumble (2018)
- Wrestle Association "R"
  - WAR World Six-Man Tag Team Championship (1 time) - with Nobuhiko Takada and Yuhi Sano
  - WAR World Six-Man Tag Team Championship Tournament (1996) - with Nobuhiko Takada and Yuhi Sano

== Mixed martial arts record ==
Professional record breakdown
1 match	1 win	0 losses
By knockout	0	0
By submission	1	0
By decision	0	0
Draws	0	

Res.	Record	Opponent	Method	Event	Date	Round	Time	Location	Notes
Win	1–0	Rocky Romero	Submission (kneebar)	Jungle Fight 3	October 23, 2004	1	0:20	Manaos, Brazil	
