= Satoru Asako =

Japanese professional wrestler

Personal information
- Born: March 2, 1971 (age 55) Omiya, Saitama, Japan

Professional wrestling career
- Ring name: Satoru Asako
- Billed height: 5 ft 8 in (1.73 m)
- Billed weight: 202 lb (92 kg)
- Trained by: All Japan Pro Wrestling; Giant Baba; Mitsuharu Misawa; Mitsuo Momota
- Debut: April 4, 1991
- Retired: July 26, 2002

Satoru Asako (浅子覚, Asako Satoru; born March 2, 1971) is a retired Japanese professional wrestler who worked for All Japan Pro Wrestling and Pro Wrestling Noah.

== Professional wrestling career ==
=== All Japan Pro Wrestling (1991–2000) ===
Satoru Asako would begin pursuing Professional Wrestling when he began training in the New Japan Pro Wrestling Dojo, and trained alongside future New Japan wrestler Osamu Nishimura. However, Asako would leave the New Japan Dojo and would join the All Japan Pro Wrestling Dojo in June 1990, which would become the start of his 10 year long run in the promotion. Giant Baba, the owner of All Japan Pro Wrestling was initially hesitant to allow Asako to join due to his small stature but allowed him to join following a mass exodus of wrestlers that took place in 1990, when Genichiro Tenryu formed Super World Sports, taking several wrestlers with him.

Satoru Asako's first All Japan Pro Wrestling television appearance would happen on the August 26th 1990 All Japan TV episode, before his debut in 1991 where he would briefly be shown training alongside Giant Baba, Mitsuharu Misawa, Kenta Kobashi, Toshiaki Kawada, Akira Taue and Tsuyoshi Kikuchi at the beach.

Asako made his debut in 1991 in a tag team match with Richard Slinger, losing to Masao Inoue and Mitsuo Momota. This was also Inoue's debut match. Since Asako's debut he spent most of his time in the opening matches and as an enhancement talent, as is customary for rookie wrestlers in Japan. As he improved, Asako won his first achievement by winning the annual New Year's Korakuen Hall Junior Heavyweight Battle Royal on January 3, 1994. Asako would also compete in his very first tournament in 1994, taking part in the Asunaro Cup where he would score 4 points, defeating Tamon Honda and Richard Slinger, but suffering defeats to Jun Akiyama, Takao Omori, Masao Inoue and Ryukaku Izumida. Early in his career he joined the Super Generation Army, where he would team up with Mitsuharu Misawa, Kenta Kobashi, Tsuyoshi Kikuchi and Jun Akiyama. Asako continued to show progression in his wrestling skills putting on classic 6 Man Tag Team Matches, often alongside his fellow Super Generation Army members. One of these matches even received a "5 Star Match" rating from the Wrestling Observer Newsletter. In 1996 he would once again compete in the Asunaro Cup, this time scoring 6 points by defeating Ryukaku Izumida, Kentaro Shiga and Maunakea Mossman, but would fail to beat Takao Omori, Masao Inoue and eventual Asunaro Cup winner Tamon Honda. Later on in 1996 Asako would challenge Tsuyoshi Kikuchi for the AJPW World Junior Heavyweight Championship during the AJPW Summer Action Series II Tour, where he would lose to Kikuchi following a competitive 21 minute long match. Although Asako would often face setbacks in most of his major matches, he would continue showing improvements more and more, becoming a sentimental underdog favorite of the All Japan fans. In 1998 he was in the opening match at AJPW's first ever Tokyo Dome event, AJPW 25th Anniversary where he defeated Yoshinobu Kanemaru. Later that year he entered in the AJPW World Junior Heavyweight Title League and made it to the finals after defeating Tsuyoshi Kikuchi, Yoshinobu Kanemaru and Kentaro Shiga in every single one of the preliminary round robin matches, but was unable to win the whole tournament as he lost to Yoshinari Ogawa in the finals.

In 1999, Asako would join NO FEAR alongside Takao Omori and Yoshihiro Takayama, which would result in him finally rising higher up the card into an upper mid card role with him even receiving the nickname of "Leader", a sign of his fastly improving stature in the promotion. And that same year, he would once again be in the opening match at a Tokyo Dome event, this time appearing at the AJPW Giant Baba Memorial Show, where he and his student, a rookie Takeshi Morishima would defeat Kentaro Shiga and Yoshinobu Kanemaru. Later on in 1999, Asako won his second ever career achievement when he would win the Summer Festival Battle Royal at a one night event at the Minase Village Tokoton Yama Camp in Akita, Japan. Throughout the rest of 1999 he would consistently win singles matches and would occasionally main event shows, usually alongside NO FEAR partners Takao Omori and Yoshihiro Takayama. Asako would also have matches outside of All Japan, appearing in Michinoku Pro on April 27, 1999 where he would team with Gran Hamada and All Japan rookie Naomichi Marufuji in a winning effort against Tiger Mask IV, Gran Naniwa and fellow All Japan wrestler Yoshinobu Kanemaru.

Asako suffered a knee injury in January 2000, and would be out of action until August 2000. He remained in All Japan until June 2000, when he followed Misawa and 24 other wrestlers to form Pro Wrestling Noah. Asako returned from his knee injury in time for NOAH's inaugural event.

=== Pro Wrestling Noah (2000–2002) ===
In 2000 Asako wrestled his first match for Noah in a 6-man tag team match on the first night of Noah's debut show, Departure 2000 at Differ Ariake with NO FEAR partners Takao Omori & Yoshihiro Takayama but was defeated by Daisuke Ikeda, Masahito Kakihara & Yoshinari Ogawa. He would wrestle again the next night on the second night of Departure, defeating former All Japan Pro Wrestling rookie, Noah wrestler Kenta Kobayashi in Kobayashi's first ever match in Noah. Asako would also go on to main event Noah's third ever show, the first night of Noah's first ever full tour, the 2000 "Exceeding Our Dreams" tour, teaming with NO FEAR partner Yoshihiro Takayama in a losing effort against Mitsuharu Misawa and Yoshinari Ogawa.

As a singles wrestler Asako continued improving his wrestling ability in a last few years of his career and showed great progress in his singles matches including the Junior Heavyweight division. In 2001 he qualified for the GHC Junior Heavyweight Title Tournament, as he defeated Matt Murphy on the first night but lost to Juventud Guerrera. Asako's star kept rising through 2001, with him competing in several main event matches teaming with his NO FEAR partners Takao Omori and Yoshihiro Takayama. And on September 5, 2001, on the Semi-Main Event of Pro Wrestling NOAH's Departure 2001 event he challenged Yoshinobu Kanemaru for the GHC Junior Heavyweight Championship, but would lose to Kanemaru after a grueling, back and forth 23 minute long matchup. Sadly, two months later in November 2001 he would suffer a neck injury that would lead to the end of his career.

On June 12, 2002 at "Noah The Truth" in Korakuen Hall, Asako would announce his retirement due to a career ending neck injury. He wrestled his last match on July 26, 2002 at Pro Wrestling Noah Accomplish Our Second Navigation at the Yoyogi National Gymnasium in Tokyo, Japan in a 6-man tag team match with his Super Generation Army partners Kobashi and Misawa, and they would defeat the team of Akira Taue, Makoto Hashi and Masao Inoue after 25 minutes, with Asako putting in a passionate performance, spending the most time in the ring out of anyone in the match, even despite his neck injury. He would get his final ever win over Hashi with his Super Driver Asako Finisher. After the match there was a retirement ceremony held, where the entire Noah roster came out to congratulate him on his career. Asako gave his retirement speech, and left the ring with his son and his NO FEAR partner Yoshihiro Takayama.

Following his retirement from in ring competition, Asako would occasionally serve as a commentator for Noah events throughout the 2000s, as well as being present at ringside as he became the company's head medical trainer, as well as a road agent.

== Personal life ==
After his retirement, Asako became a trainer and road agent for Pro Wrestling Noah, as well as a judoka instructor.

He also now runs an Orthopedic Clinic in Gyotoku, Ichikawa City Japan, which he has operated since 2011.

After his retirement, Asako would still show up at Wrestling Events every now and then. Most notably, he was former NO FEAR partner and personal friend Takao Omori's manager at Fortune Dream 7 in 2022, where Omori defeated GLEAT wrestler Issei Onitsuka.

== Championships and accomplishments ==
- All Japan Pro Wrestling

- January 3 Korakuen Hall Junior Heavyweight Battle Royal (1994)
- Summer Festival Battle Royal (1999)
