= Gary Albright =

American professional wrestler (1963–2000)

Personal information
- Born: Gary Mitchell Albright; May 18, 1963 North Kingstown, Rhode Island, U.S.
- Died: January 7, 2000 (aged 36) Hazleton, Pennsylvania, U.S.
- Education: University of Nebraska–Lincoln
- Spouse: Monica Anoaʻi
- Children: 3
- Family: Anoaʻi (by marriage)

Professional wrestling career
- Ring name(s): Gary Albright; Vokhan Singh
- Billed height: 6 ft 4 in (193 cm)
- Billed weight: 353 lb (160 kg)
- Billed from: Billings, Montana (as Gary Albright); Karachi, Pakistan (as Vokhan Singh)
- Trained by: Billy Robinson; Danny Hodge; Lou Thesz
- Debut: 1988

Medal record

Collegiate Wrestling

Representing the Nebraska Cornhuskers

NCAA Division I Championships
Silver medal – second place	1984 East Rutherford	Heavyweight
Bronze medal – third place	1986 Iowa City	Heavyweight

Gary Mitchell Albright (May 18, 1963 – January 7, 2000) was an American professional wrestler best known for his work in Japan, first with UWF International (UWFi), and later All Japan Pro Wrestling (AJPW). In AJPW, Albright was a two-time World Tag Team Champion. Albright was also known for his work with Stampede Wrestling in Canada, under his birth name as well as the ring name Vokhan Singh.

An accomplished amateur wrestler, Albright translated this into his professional wrestling style, utilising many suplexes and throws throughout his career, earning the nickname "Master of Suplex".

Albright was a member through marriage of the famous Anoaʻi wrestling family. His widow, Monica, is the daughter of Afa Anoaʻi. He had a son, Samuel, and two daughters, Angelica and Alexandria.

On January 7, 2000, Gary Albright collapsed in-ring upon receiving a cutter from his opponent. Only minutes after being removed from the ring, Albright was pronounced dead. The cause of death was later ruled to be a heart attack.

== Amateur wrestling career ==
Albright was born in Rhode Island and started amateur wrestling while in high school. Albright wrestled for Billings West High School in Billings, Montana where he had a 55-2 record. Albright was the 1980 Montana state champion. In 1981 Albright placed 2nd in the state championships in Helena, Montana. Albright would go on to wrestle in the NCAA for the University of Nebraska–Lincoln where he set the Nebraska record for total falls in a season: 38 falls in the 1985-1986 season.

Highlights of Albright's amateur career include:

- 1980 Montana State Champion; 1981 Montana state runner-up (55-2 record)
- University of Nebraska 58 wins – 4 losses – 3 draws
- Big 8 Champion
- Big 8 All-Academic team
- NCAA Runner-up
- Freestyle and Greco-Roman
- U.S. team member from 1981–1984
- 1982 National Open Freestyle champion
- 1981 World Greco-Roman Elite champion
- Member of the "Sunkist Kids" national championship team

== Professional wrestling career ==
=== Stampede Wrestling (1988–1989) ===
After graduating college Albright began to train for a professional wrestling career, getting advice and training on pro wrestling by prominent wrestlers such as Lou Thesz, Billy Robinson and Danny Hodge in the process. In 1988 Gary Albright got his first break in wrestling when he signed on with Stu Hart's Stampede Wrestling out of Calgary, Alberta, Canada. Albright was brought to the Hart family's attention by Brian Pillman who knew of Albright through a mutual acquaintance. He started out as a face but it wasn't long until the promoters decided he would work better as a heel.

Albright's gimmick was changed to that of "Vokhan Singh", and was billed from Karachi, Pakistan. Albright was teamed up with Makhan Singh (Mike Shaw) to form Karachi Vice. Albright and Shaw were led by Gama Singh (who was from India), the founder of Karachi Vice, and the stable also included Steve DiSalvo and Kerry Brown. The two 300+ pound men made a formidable combination and would see success, beating the British Bulldogs for the Stampede International Tag Team Championship on December 30, 1988. The team defended the titles for just about four months until losing them to Chris Benoit and Biff Wellington on April 8, 1989. Stampede closed by the end of 1989 at which point Albright began looking elsewhere for employment.

=== Various promotions (1989–1991) ===
Albright wound up working a couple of tours of South Africa, USWA, making appearances in WCW (World Championship Wrestling), New Japan Pro-Wrestling, World Wrestling Council in Puerto Rico and various independent federations between 1989 and 1991.

=== UWF International (1991–1995) ===
Thanks to Bruce Hart, Gary Albright managed to sign up with the recently created Union of Wrestling Forces International, also known as UWF International or UWFi. The UWFi was a shoot style professional wrestling promotion. This meant that they presented an in ring product that focused on seemingly legitimate striking, suplexes, and submissions, but like all professional wrestling the outcome was pre-determined.

Albright made his debut with UWFi on August 24, 1991, knocking out Yoji Anjoh in 7:29. Albright's massive size and his amateur background made his suplexes seem very impressive, to add to Albright's "Suplex machine" image he was typically booked to win by knocking out his opponents with brutal German suplexes such as his 5:26 victory by knock out over Kiyoshi Tamura on December 22, 1991. The highlight of Gary Albright's initial UWFi push came on May 8, 1992 when he knocked out Nobuhiko Takada with his signature German suplex at Yokohama Arena in front of an announced crowd of 14,000. Takada was UWFi's biggest Japanese star, the loss to Albright helped cement him as a serious competitor in the UWFi. Albright continued his winning ways in singles and tag matches through the summer of 1992 defeating such notable competitors as "Bad News" Brown. Albright's string of victories came to an end when he lost a rematch with Takada on September 21, 1992. Albright submitted to Takada's cross arm breaker, thus making Takada the first UWFi World champion.

After the loss to Takada, Albright continued to win singles matches, usually in less than five minutes, but with the arrival of Super Vader, Gary Albright was supplanted as the top Gaijin in the federation, fighting in the undercard instead of the main events. Albright teamed up with Dan Severn in a loss to Salman Hashimikov and Vladimir Berkovich. Hashimikov forced Severn to submit to a cross arm breaker in 13:09 on the first UWFi PPV broadcast in American called "Shootfighting". Albright began to get pushed again in 1994 as part of UWFi's "Best of the World" tournament. In the first round of the tournament Albright knocked out Billy Scott in 2:11. He then defeated Yoji Anjoh in the second round to advance to a semifinal match with Nobuhiko Takada. On June 10, 1994, in front of a sellout crowd at Nippon Budokan, Albright lost by submission in 16:00 in the main event. Albright defeated Kiyoshi Tamura on August 18, 1994 to finish third in the tournament, the same night that Vader defeated Takada for the UWFi title.

With Albright finishing third in the tournament and Vader defeating Takada to win the tournament the UWFi started to promote a meeting between Vader and Albright as an UWFi "Dream Match". Building up to the singles title match the two faced off in a couple of tag-team matches leading up to the big event. On October 8, 1994, Albright forced Vader to submit to the cross arm breaker in a main event tag team match, then on November 30, 1994, Albright forced Takada to submit to a cross arm breaker in the main event to earn a match with Vader in January. The UWFi "Dream Match" took place on January 16, 1995, a match that saw Vader winning the match in 11:25 using a choke hold. The build up and the match were a commercial success, with Albright and Vader drawing large sellout crowds in their two tag team main events, Albright's contenders match with Takada, and the Vader versus Albright title match.

During 1995 UWFi began having problems as while they had pushed Albright, Takada and Vader to the main event they had not succeeded in building up more challengers and their attendance was dwindling. On May 17, 1995, Albright lost to Masahito Kakihara in the semi main event to build up Kakihara for a match with Takada. On June 18, 1995 Albright was supposed to put over Kiyoshi Tamura to build him into a main eventer. The match saw Albright ignore the referee's instructions as he yelled "Break Gary, break!" Albright also laid around on the mat doing nothing much until Tamura secured a rear choke and Albright tapped out. It is not clear if Albright's actions in this match were legitimate or part of a storyline. Albright returned two months later, on August 18, 1995 and submitted to Tamura in the main event without incident. Six days later UWFi announced a working agreement with New Japan Pro-Wrestling and Albright left the promotion, signing with All Japan Pro Wrestling.

=== All Japan Pro Wrestling (1995–1999) ===
On October 25, 1995 Albright lost to Toshiaki Kawada at Budokan Hall in a semi-main event singles match. Albright teamed with Stan Hansen on the following tour and the pair finished third in the World's Strongest Tag Determination League. On January 24, 1996 Albright and Hansen beat Kawada and Taue for the World Tag Team Championship, but lost them four weeks later on February 20, 1996 in a rematch with Kawada and Taue. Albright challenged Mitsuharu Misawa for the Triple Crown Heavyweight Championship on March 2, 1996 but Misawa's high flying style was too great to overcome. Misawa won by pinfall after his rolling elbow to retain the title in Albright's only shot at the main AJPW title.

After the loss to Misawa, Albright would have a lackluster 1996, finishing seventh in each of his four Champion Carnival appearances. Albright teamed with Sabu in the 1996 World's Strongest Tag Determination League, finishing last with 6 points scoring only 3 wins in the tournament.

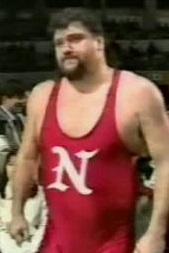
Albright at an AJPW live event in January 1999

Albright's AJPW run would reach its pinnacle when he teamed with "Dr. Death" Steve Williams and Lacrosse in early 1997, forming a stable called the "Triangle of Power". Albright and Williams finished third in the World's Strongest Tag Determination League that year in December, and prior to that they won the World Tag Team Championship titles on July 25, 1997 (aired on August 31 edition of AJPW TV). Albright found his most success in AJPW teaming with Williams, being a dominant team defeating main event wrestlers like Mitsuharu Misawa and Jun Akiyama, as well as cutting various promos with Williams. Albright and Williams would the leading gaijin tag team heading into AJPW's first pay-per-view show at the Tokyo Dome on May 1, 1998, which sold 58,300 seats and was the third highest grossing show in AJPW's history. On that show Williams and Albright defeated Masahito Kakihara and Yoshihiro Takayama.

Albright became the leader of the Triangle of Power after Williams left the promotion to join the WWF in June 1998 (right when the WWF Brawl For All started), and Lacrosse dropped the character; their replacements were Yoshihiro Takayama and Masahito Kakihara, two former UWFI mid-carders who Williams and Albright defeated at the pay-per-view the month prior. Although he had a successful 1997 and first half of 1998, Albright would find himself in the midcard again and his new faction was not pushed. Albright teamed with Giant Kimala in the 1998 World's Strongest Tag Determination League, winning only one match on TV. Despite this, the team would commonly win matches on house shows.

In 1999, Albright became an upper midcarder participating in feuds against Bart Gunn, Johnny Ace, Stan Hansen and Big Van Vader, scoring some TV wins against them in tag-team matches. However, during the fall of 1999 Albright started losing more matches on AJPW TV, most of his TV wins by that point defeating jobbers and lower-midcarders. Albright teamed with Wolf Hawkfield (the renamed Lacrosse) to finish last in the 1999 Tag League, including a defeat to former charge Takayama and Takao Omori.

Albright won his final match in All Japan on the December 3, 1999 pay-per-view, beating Masao Inoue in 8:35.

=== Extreme Championship Wrestling (1996) ===
Albright made a single appearance with the Philadelphia, Pennsylvania-based promotion Extreme Championship Wrestling in December 1996, squashing Rick Rage at Holiday Hell.

== Death ==
On January 7, 2000, Albright wrestled at a World Xtreme Wrestling show in Hazleton, Pennsylvania against Lucifer Grimm. After being hit with a cutter, Albright collapsed to the canvas. A worried Grimm rolled Albright on top of himself to finish the match after which concerned wrestlers and ring crew tried to resuscitate him. Albright was pronounced dead shortly after being removed from the ring.

The official cause of death is listed as a heart attack. The medical examiners also found that Albright suffered from diabetes, had an enlarged heart, and blockage of several coronary arteries. Because it was determined that Albright died of natural causes, the police were never involved in the matter.

A Gary Albright Memorial Show was co-promoted by WXW, the World Wrestling Federation, and All Japan Pro Wrestling in Albright's honor three months after his death. Close friend and fellow Anoaʻi family member The Rock opened the show by remembering and paying tribute to Albright.

== Championships and accomplishments ==
- All Japan Pro Wrestling
  - World Tag Team Championship (2 times) - with Stan Hansen (1 time) and "Dr. Death" Steve Williams (1 time)
- George Tragos/Lou Thesz Professional Wrestling Hall of Fame
  - Class of 2023
- Pro Wrestling Illustrated
  - PWI ranked him #74 of the 500 best singles wrestlers in the PWI 500 in 1995
  - PWI ranked him #259 of the 500 best singles wrestlers during the PWI Years in 2003
- Stampede Wrestling
  - Stampede International Tag Team Championship (1 time) - with Makhan Singh
- Wrestling Observer Newsletter
  - Rookie of the Year (1988)

== See also ==
- List of premature professional wrestling deaths
