= Taiyō Kea =

American professional wrestler (born 1975)

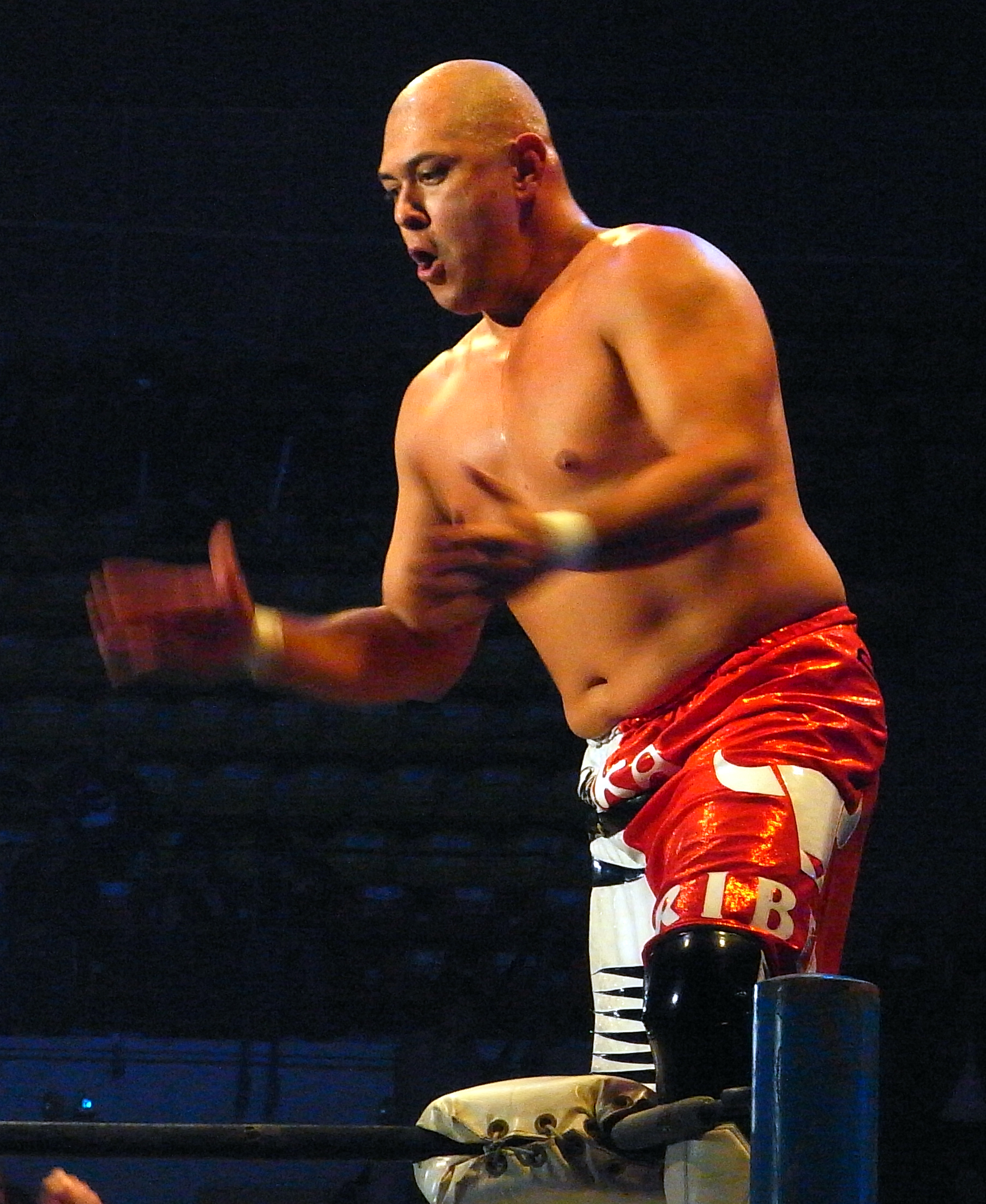
- Taiyō Kea in 2010

Personal information
- Born: Maunakea Mossman; November 18, 1975 (age 51) Honolulu, Hawaii, United States

Professional wrestling career
- Ring name(s): Agnes Kamen; Maunakea Mossman; Taiyō Kea
- Billed height: 6 ft 1 in (185 cm)
- Billed weight: 234 lb (106 kg)
- Trained by: All Japan Pro Wrestling; Giant Baba; Yoshinari Ogawa; Keiji Mutoh; Kenta Kobashi
- Debut: November 26, 1994
- Retired: January 31, 2025

Maunakea Mossman (born November 18, 1975) is an American retired professional wrestler, best known under his ring name Taiyō Kea (太陽ケア). Best known for his work in All Japan Pro Wrestling (AJPW), he is the only wrestler in AJPW's history to have held the Triple Crown Heavyweight Championship, the World Tag Team Championship and the World Junior Heavyweight Championship.

Born in Honolulu, Kea trained with and debuted for AJPW as a junior heavyweight in 1994, and won the World Junior Heavyweight Championship once in 1997, vacating the championship upon his graduation to heavyweight the following year. Following the 2000 exodus, Kea remained with the promotion and was pushed as one of its top gaijin throughout the 2000s, winning the Triple Crown Heavyweight Championship once, the Champion Carnival twice (in 2006 and 2012), the World's Strongest Tag Determination League three times (in 2001, 2002 and 2004), as well as being a seven-time and the longest-reigning World Tag Team Champion, a record he shares with partner Minoru Suzuki.

== Professional wrestling career ==
=== All Japan Pro Wrestling ===
==== Junior Heavyweight Champion and Mossman Trial Series (1994–1998) ====
Mossman was a Hawaiian state amateur wrestling champion, and after he graduated high school, was persuaded by his uncle King Curtis Iaukea to write an athletic resume, which Iaukea gave to Lord James Blears, who then gave it to Giant Baba. Mossman met with Baba, his wife and referee Kyohei Wada during a trip to Hawaii, where Baba offered Mossman a job as a trainee with All Japan Pro Wrestling. Mossman began training four days later, and debuted in November 1994 as a junior heavyweight under his real name. Mossman was pushed as a babyface almost immediately, and defeated Yoshinari Ogawa to win the World Junior Heavyweight Championship in August 1997. He vacated the title in 1998, after graduating to the heavyweight division. Upon his graduation, he took part in a series of 7 matches designed to test his mettle as a heavyweight competitor, dubbed the Mossman Trial Series. Mossman won three of the matches, defeating Johnny Smith, Wolf Hawkfield and Giant Kimala, but lost to Toshiaki Kawada, Akira Taue, Kenta Kobashi and Mitsuharu Misawa.

==== Tag title reigns (1999–2006) ====
On October 25, 1999, Mossman and Johnny Smith unsuccessfully challenged for the vacant All Asia Tag Team Championship, losing to Masao Inoue and Tamon Honda. Following Baba's death in 1999, Mitsuharu Misawa became the new head booker of AJPW and chose to postpone Mossman's push. In 2000, Misawa and all but two native talent left All Japan in a mass exodus to form Pro Wrestling Noah. Mossman was one of the few who chose to remain in All Japan Pro Wrestling, aiding in the rebuilding process along with Toshiaki Kawada, Masanobu Fuchi, Hiroshi Hase, Stan Hansen, the returning Genichiro Tenryu, Nobutaka Araya and Shigeo Okumura. In an effort to make him more marketable to Japanese fans, Mossman stopped using his real name and was given the semi-Japanese ring name "Taiyō Kea" (太陽ケア) (from taiyo, sun, and the Hawaiian word kea, white – also derived from the last three letters of his first name). Kea was pushed as a strong loyalist and won the World Tag Team Championship with Johnny Smith in January 2001. In April, Kea took part in the 2001 Champion Carnival, finishing with 15 points and advancing to the final where he lost to Genichiro Tenryu.

In 2001, Kea also began appearing in New Japan Pro-Wrestling where he became a member of Keiji Mutoh's BATT stable, and by October 2001, he would form a successful tag team with Mutoh as they made history twice in one week by winning both the World Tag Team Championship and New Japan Pro-Wrestling's IWGP Tag Team Championship, which made them the first team to not only win both titles, but also the first to hold them simultaneously. The team also would win the 2001 World's Strongest Tag Determination League. In 2002, Kea briefly competed for Major League Wrestling (MLW), where he appeared at the company's inaugural event Genesis, where he competed in the tournament to crown the first MLW World Heavyweight Champion, where he defeated The Wall in the quarter-finals, wrestled Vampiro to a draw in the semi-finals and lost in the final to Shane Douglas in a 3-Way Dance (which also featured Vampiro). Kea would compete for MLW again on September 26 at Reload, where he defeated Sabu to become the #1 contender for the World Heavyweight Championship, but Kea never returned to the promotion to claim the opportunity.

In 2003, Kea joined Taka Michinoku's RO&D stable as second-in-command, and won the World Tag Team Championship for a fourth time with Jamal in 2005. On April 20, 2006, Kea won AJPW's Champion Carnival, defeating Minoru Suzuki in the semi-finals and Suwama in the finals.

==== Championship pursuit (2006–2010) ====
On July 3, 2006, he won the Triple Crown Heavyweight Championship for the first time in his career after defeating Satoshi Kojima. He made one successful defence, defeating Toshiaki Kawada on August 27. He lost the championship to Minoru Suzuki on September 3 after two months. He participated in the 2006 World's Strongest Tag Determination League with Taka Michinoku as his partner, finishing fourth in their block with two wins and 5 points.

On January 4, 2007, Kea challenged Hiroshi Tanahashi for the IWGP Heavyweight Championship at NJPW's Wrestle Kingdom, losing after falling to Tanahashi's High Fly Flow. On February 17, Kea and Toshiaki Kawada defeated Suwama and RO'Z to claim the vacant World Tag Team Championship. From March 26 to March 30, Kea competed in the 2007 Champion Carnival, finishing with 1 win and 4 points. In August 2007, Kea and Kawada lost the championships to the Voodoo Murders (Satoshi Kojima and TARU).

In 2008, Kea and Minoru Suzuki formed the Gurentai stable along with Tokyo Gurentai's Mazada, Nosawa Rongai, and Takemura. He and Suzuki defeated Joe Doering and Keiji Mutoh to win the World Tag Team Championship on June 28 during the Crossover tour. On August 31, Kea wrestled Suwama to a time limit draw for the Triple Crown Heavyweight Championship.

In early 2009, Kea and Suzuki successfully defended the titles against Suwama and Shuji Kondo. The two proceeded to team mostly with Yoshihiro Takayama, before Kea injured his knee, taking him out of action for 5 months. Kea returned during the Taiwan Cup, where he was eliminated in the first round by Masayuki Kono. After over a year as champions, Kea and Suzuki lost the titles to Masakatsu Funaki and Keiji Mutoh on January 3, 2010.

==== Partisan Forces (2010–2011) ====
Later in 2010, Kea formed a tag team with Akebono known as Partisan Forces. The duo defeated Suwama and Ryota Hama to win the vacant World Tag Team Championship on July 4. On January 10, 2011, Kea unsuccessfully challenged Suwama for the Triple Crown Heavyweight Championship. On February 6, Kea and Akebono lost the championships to the Voodoo Murders (Joe Doering and Kono). In November, Kea travelled to Pro Wrestling Noah, where he unsuccessfully challenged Jun Akiyama for the GHC Heavyweight Championship.

==== Final years (2012–2013) ====
On May 7, 2012, Kea won his second Champion Carnival, defeating Suwama in the final. In July, he unsuccessfully challenged Jun Akiyama for the Triple Crown Heavyweight Championship.

On November 30, 2012, Kea announced that he was putting his wrestling career on hold to attend business school in his native Hawaii. His farewell match, a ten-man tag team match, took place on January 3, 2013, where he, Keiji Mutoh, Masakatsu Funaki, Masanobu Fuchi and Taka Michinoku defeated Hiroshi Yamato, Manabu Soya, Ryota Hama, Suwama and Takao Omori. Kea announced his return to All Japan in a press conference on June 11, 2013. Kea wrestled his return match on June 30, where he and Takao Omori defeated Joe Doering and Yasufumi Nakanoue.

=== Freelancer (2014–2025) ===
On March 2, 2014, Kea made a surprise jump to Keiji Mutoh's AJPW splinter promotion Wrestle-1 at Kaisen: Outbreak. For the next few months, Kea, billed as a freelancer, worked only sporadic Wrestle-1 events, spending most of his time in Hawaii. Kea returned to AJPW on January 31, 2015, to take part in Giant Baba's memorial event. Kea returned to All Japan once again in October 2017, teaming with Masanobu Fuchi and Manabu Soya to defeat Fuminori Abe, Yoshihiro Tajiri and Yohei Nakajima.

== Championships and accomplishments ==
- All Japan Pro Wrestling

- Triple Crown Heavyweight Championship (1 time)
- World Junior Heavyweight Championship (1 time)
- World Tag Team Championship (7 times) – with Johnny Smith (1), Keiji Mutoh (1), Satoshi Kojima (1), Jamal (1), Toshiaki Kawada (1), Minoru Suzuki (1) and Akebono (1)
- Champion Carnival (2006, 2012)
- World's Strongest Tag Determination League (2001) – with Keiji Mutoh
- World's Strongest Tag Determination League (2002) – with Satoshi Kojima
- World's Strongest Tag Determination League (2004) – with Jamal
- January 2 Korakuen Hall Heavyweight Battle Royal (2013)
- January 3 Korakuen Hall Junior Heavyweight Battle Royal (1997, 1998)

- Hawai'i Championship Wrestling

- HCW Kekaulike Heritage Tag Team Championship (1 time) – with Jamal

- New Japan Pro-Wrestling

- IWGP Tag Team Championship (1 time) – with Keiji Mutoh

- Nikkan Sports
  - Fighting Spirit Award (2001)
- Pro Wrestling Illustrated
  - PWI ranked him #11 of the 500 best singles wrestlers in the PWI 500 in 2006.
  - PWI ranked him #416 of the 500 best singles wrestlers during the PWI Years in 2003.
- Tokyo Sports
  - Best Tag Team Award (2008) – with Minoru Suzuki
