= World Junior Heavyweight Championship (AJPW) =

Professional wrestling championship

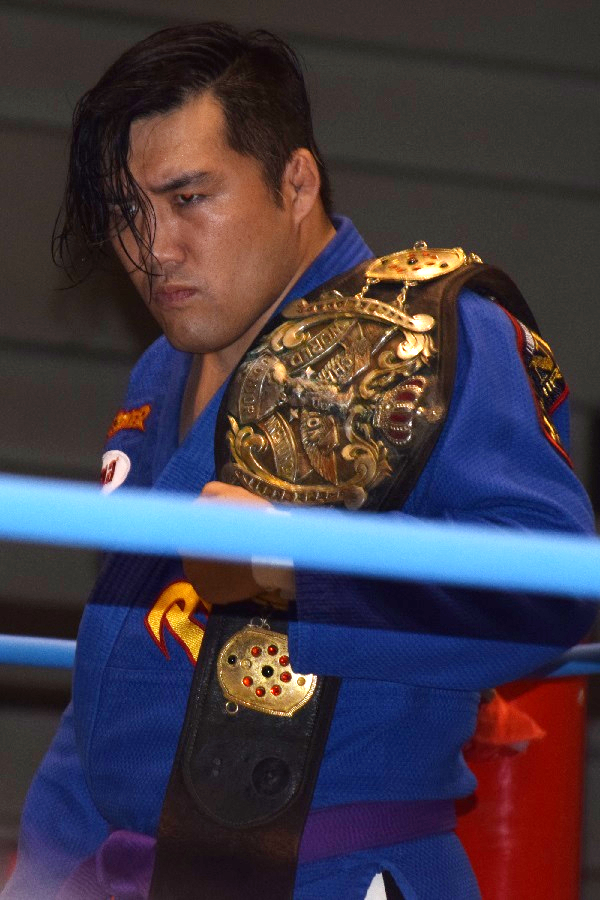
- Hikaru Sato with the second design of the title in July 2017

Details
- Promotion: All Japan Pro Wrestling
- Date established: July 31, 1986
- Current champion: Dan Tamura
- Date won: June 18, 2026

Other name
- AJPW World Junior Heavyweight Championship (1985–present)
Statistics
- First champion: Hiro Saito
- Most reigns: Masanobu Fuchi (5 reigns)
- Longest reign: Masanobu Fuchi (1,309 days)
- Shortest reign: Shinichi Nakano (4 days)
- Oldest champion: Tiger Mask (IV) (51 years, 7 months and 30 days)
- Youngest champion: Katsuhiko Nakajima (18 years, 11 months and 6 days)

The Pacific Wrestling Federation (PWF) World Junior Heavyweight Championship (世界ジュニアヘビー級王座, Sekai Junia Hebī-kyū Ōza) is a professional wrestling world title in Japanese promotion All Japan Pro Wrestling, contested exclusively among junior heavyweight (<235 lb (107 kg)) wrestlers. It was created on July 31, 1986, when Hiro Saito defeated Brad Armstrong in a tournament final.

== Title history ==
The original World Junior Heavyweight Championship belt had a similar design to the title it replaced, the NWA International Junior Heavyweight Championship, which had been around since 1982 and only replacing the word "International" with "World". This belt was replaced with a new belt on August 27, 2017. On June 3, 2019, then-champion Atsushi Aoki died in a motorcycle accident and the belt was retired and given to Aoki's family. A new belt with a new design debuted on January 3, 2020.

There have been a total of 47 recognized champions who have had a combined 74 official reigns and six vacancies. The title is currently held by Dan Tamura who is in his second reign.

Key
No.	Overall reign number
Reign	Reign number for the specific champion
Days	Number of days held
Defenses	Number of successful defenses
+	Current reign is changing daily

No.	Champion	Championship change			Reign statistics			Notes	Ref.
No.	Champion	Date	Event	Location	Reign	Days	Defenses	Notes	Ref.
All Japan Pro Wrestling (AJPW)
1	Hiro Saito	July 31, 1986	Live event	Tokyo, Japan	1	115	3	Defeated Brad Armstrong in a tournament final.	
2	Kuniaki Kobayashi	November 23, 1986	Live event	Tokyo, Japan	1	41	1		
3	Masanobu Fuchi	January 3, 1987	Live event	Tokyo, Japan	1	748	7		
4	Joe Malenko	January 20, 1989	Live event	Fukuoka, Japan	1	5	0		
5	Mighty Inoue	January 25, 1989	Live event	Osaka, Japan	1	42	2		
6	Masanobu Fuchi	March 8, 1989	Live event	Tokyo, Japan	2	39	1		
7	Shinichi Nakano	April 16, 1989	Live event	Tokyo, Japan	1	4	0		
8	Mitsuo Momota	April 20, 1989	Live event	Osaka, Japan	1	72	2		
9	Joe Malenko	July 1, 1989	Live event	Omiya, Japan	2	111	2		
10	Masanobu Fuchi	October 20, 1989	Live event	Nagoya, Japan	3	1,309	14		
11	Dan Kroffat	May 21, 1993	Live event	Sapporo, Japan	1	94	1		
12	Masanobu Fuchi	August 23, 1993	Live event	Shizuoka, Japan	4	323	2		
13	Dan Kroffat	July 12, 1994	Live event	Kagoshima, Japan	2	425	5		
14	Yoshinari Ogawa	September 10, 1995	Live event	Tokyo, Japan	1	294	4		
15	Masanobu Fuchi	June 30, 1996	Live event	Tokyo, Japan	5	24	0		
16	Tsuyoshi Kikuchi	July 24, 1996	Live event	Tokyo, Japan	1	175	2		
17	Yoshinari Ogawa	January 15, 1997	Live event	Tokyo, Japan	2	219	1		
18	Maunakea Mossman	August 22, 1997	Live event	Tokyo, Japan	1	294	3		
—	Vacated	June 12, 1998	—	—	—	—	—	Vacated due to Mossman graduating to the heavyweight division.	
19	Yoshinari Ogawa	July 19, 1998	Summer Action Series tour	Niigata, Japan	3	698	5	Defeated Satoru Asako in a tournament final.	
—	Vacated	June 16, 2000	—	—	—	—	—	Vacated due to Ogawa and several others leaving AJPW to form Pro Wrestling Noah.	
20	Kendo Kashin	April 13, 2002	Grand Champion Carnival	Tokyo, Japan	1	670	8	Defeated Masanobu Fuchi.	
—	Vacated	February 12, 2004	—	—	—	—	—	Vacated on February 12, 2004 due to inactivity.	
21	Kaz Hayashi	February 22, 2004	Excite Series tour	Tokyo, Japan	1	323	6	Defeated Blue-K.	
22	Taka Michinoku	January 10, 2005	Kaientai Dojo's CLUB-K SUPER kick	Tokyo, Japan	1	285	12	This match was also for Hayashi's Strongest-K Championship.	
23	Shuji Kondo	October 22, 2005	Shining Series tour	Tokyo, Japan	1	483	5		
24	Katsuhiko Nakajima	February 17, 2007	Puroresu Love in Ryogoku vol. 2	Tokyo, Japan	1	378	3	The title was held up on October 18, 2007 after a title defense against Silver King ended in a no contest, though Nakajima remained the official champion.	
25	Silver King	March 1, 2008	Puroresu Love in Ryogoku vol. 4	Tokyo, Japan	1	59	0		
26	Ryuji Hijikata	April 29, 2008	Growin' Up tour	Nagoya, Japan	1	152	3		
27	Naomichi Marufuji	September 28, 2008	Flashing tour	Yokohama, Japan	1	131	4		
28	Kaz Hayashi	February 6, 2009	Excite Series tour	Tokyo, Japan	2	695	17		
29	Minoru	January 2, 2011	New Year Shining Series tour	Tokyo, Japan	1	152	1		
—	Vacated	June 3, 2011	—	—	—	—	—	Vacated after All Japan Pro Wrestling suspended Minoru.	
30	Kai	June 19, 2011	2011 Puroresu Love in Ryōgoku	Tokyo, Japan	1	126	2	Defeated Shuji Kondo for the vacant title.	
31	Kenny Omega	October 23, 2011	Puroresu Love in Ryōgoku Vol. 13	Tokyo, Japan	1	217	5		
32	Kai	May 27, 2012	Rise Up Tour 2012	Tokyo, Japan	2	77	0		
33	Hiroshi Yamato	August 12, 2012	Summer Impact 2012	Tokyo, Japan	1	143	5		
34	Shuji Kondo	January 2, 2013	2013 New Year Shining Series: New Year 2Days	Tokyo, Japan	2	52	0	This match was also contested for Kondo's GHC Junior Heavyweight Championship.	
35	Yoshinobu Kanemaru	February 23, 2013	2013 Excite Series	Tokyo, Japan	1	295	7		
36	Último Dragón	December 15, 2013	2013 Fan Appreciation Day	Tokyo, Japan	1	165	2		
37	Atsushi Aoki	May 29, 2014	2014 Super Power Series	Tokyo, Japan	1	302	5		
38	Kotaro Suzuki	March 27, 2015	2015 Dream Power Series	Tokyo, Japan	1	234	6		
—	Vacated	November 16, 2015	—	—	—	—	—	Vacated due to Suzuki leaving AJPW.	
39	Atsushi Aoki	February 21, 2016	2016 Excite Series	Tokyo, Japan	2	119	3	Defeated Hikaru Sato in the finals of the 2016 Jr. Battle of Glory.	
40	Hikaru Sato	June 19, 2016	2016 Dynamite Series	Tokyo, Japan	1	70	1		
41	Soma Takao	August 28, 2016	Ryōgoku Peter Pan 2016	Tokyo, Japan	1	91	1	This was a DDT Pro-Wrestling event.	
42	Keisuke Ishii	November 27, 2016	Zen Nihon Puroresu in Ryōgoku Kokugikan	Tokyo, Japan	1	152	3		
43	Hikaru Sato	April 28, 2017	2017 Champion Carnival: 45th Anniversary Series	Okayama, Japan	2	93	4		
44	Tajiri	July 30, 2017	2017 Summer Action Series	Osaka, Japan	1	28	0		
45	Último Dragón	August 27, 2017	2017 Summer Explosion	Tokyo, Japan	2	55	1		
46	Tajiri	October 21, 2017	Jun Akiyama and Takao Omori Debut 25th Anniversary Show	Yokohama, Japan	2	105	3		
47	Atsushi Aoki	February 3, 2018	2018 Yokohama Twilight Blues Special	Yokohama, Japan	3	204	4		
48	Koji Iwamoto	August 26, 2018	2018 Summer Explosion ~ Jr. Tag Battle of Glory	Chiba, Japan	1	27	0		
49	Shuji Kondo	September 22, 2018	Royal Road Tournament 2018	Fukuoka, Japan	3	68	1		
50	Koji Iwamoto	November 29, 2018	Real World Tag League 2018	Nagoya, Japan	2	172	2		
51	Atsushi Aoki	May 20, 2019	Super Power Series 2019	Tokyo, Japan	4	184	0	On June 3, 2019, Aoki died in a motorcycle accident. AJPW announced Aoki would be recognized as champion until November 20. On October 24, AJPW announced a tournament to crown a new champion would start on November 21 and finish on January 3, 2020.	
—	Vacated	November 20, 2019	—	—	—	—	—	Vacated after Aoki died in a motorcycle accident and the six month deadline for a title defense expired.	
52	Susumu Yokosuka	January 3, 2020	New Year Wars 2020	Tokyo, Japan	1	204	5	Defeated Hikaru Sato in a tournament final to win the vacant championship	
53	Koji Iwamoto	July 25, 2020	Summer Action Series 2020	Tokyo, Japan	3	210	4		
54	Cima	February 20, 2021	Excite Series 2021 - Day 2	Nagoya, Japan	1	109	2		
55	Koji Iwamoto	June 9, 2021	AJPW Dynamite Series 2021 - Day 1	Tokyo, Japan	4	17	0		
56	Akira Francesco	June 26, 2021	Champions Night ~ From The Land Of The Triple Crown Unification Flight To The 50th Anniversary	Tokyo, Japan	1	26	0		
57	Sugi	July 22, 2021	Summer Action Series 2021	Tokyo, Japan	1	86	2		
58	Izanagi	October 16, 2021	AJPW Champions Night 2 ~ All Japan Pro Wrestling 20th Anniversary	Tokyo, Japan	1	61	0		
59	Super Crazy	December 16, 2021	Prime Night 2021	Tokyo, Japan	1	18	0		
60	Sugi	January 3, 2022	New Year Wars 2022	Tokyo, Japan	2	51	2		
61	Hikaru Sato	February 23, 2022	AJPW Excite Series 2022	Tokyo, Japan	3	116	3		
62	Tiger Mask (IV)	June 19, 2022	AJPW Champions 50th Anniversary	Tokyo, Japan	1	91	3		
63	Atsuki Aoyagi	September 18, 2022	AJPW 50th Anniversary	Tokyo, Japan	1	154	5		
64	Naruki Doi	February 19, 2023	AJPW Excite Series 2023	Tokyo, Japan	1	99	2		
65	Atsuki Aoyagi	May 29, 2023	Super Power Series 2023	Tokyo, Japan	2	33	1		
66	El Lindaman	July 2, 2023	Summer Action Series 2023	Tokyo, Japan	1	182	4		
67	Dan Tamura	December 31, 2023	Mania X 2023	Tokyo, Japan	1	69	3		
68	Rising Hayato	March 9, 2024	Dream Power Series 2024	Tokyo, Japan	1	126	3		
69	Naruki Doi	July 13, 2024	Summer Action Series 2024	Osaka, Japan	2	197	5		
70	Musashi	January 26, 2025	New Year Wars 2025	Chiba, Japan	1	112	2		
71	Seiki Yoshioka	May 18, 2025	Champion Carnival 2025	Tokyo, Japan	1	84	2		
72	Atsuki Aoyagi	August 10, 2025	Nettou Summer Action Wars 2025	Matsumoto, Japan	3	168	4		
73	Seigo Tachibana	January 25, 2026	New Year Wars 2026	Chiba, Japan	1	144	0		
74	Dan Tamura	June 18, 2026	Super Power Series 2026	Tokyo, Japan	2	149+	3		

== Combined reigns ==
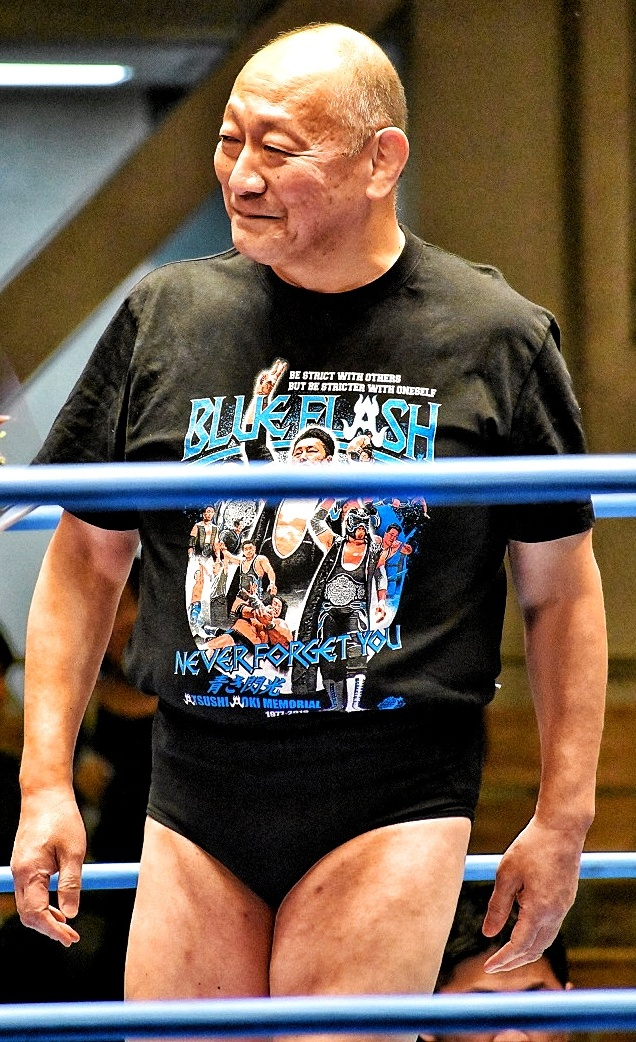
Record five-time and longest-single-reigning champion at 1,309 days and combined reigning at 2,443 days, Masanobu Fuchi

As of November 14, 2026.

†	Indicates the current champion

Rank	Wrestler	No. of reigns	Combined defenses	Combined days
1	Masanobu Fuchi	5	24	2,443
2	Yoshinari Ogawa	3	10	1,211
3	Kaz Hayashi	2	23	1,018
4	Atsushi Aoki	4	12	810
5	Kendo Kashin	1	8	670
6	Shuji Kondo	3	6	603
7	Dan Kroffat	2	6	519
8	Koji Iwamoto	4	6	426
9	Katsuhiko Nakajima	1	3	378
10	Atsuki Aoyagi	3	10	355
11	Naruki Doi	2	7	296
12	Yoshinobu Kanemaru	1	7	295
13	Maunakea Mossman	1	3	294
14	Taka Michinoku	1	12	285
15	Hikaru Sato	3	8	279
16	Kotaro Suzuki	1	6	234
17	Último Dragón	2	3	220
18	Dan Tamura †	2	6	218+
19	Kenny Omega	1	5	217
20	Susumu Yokosuka	1	5	204
21	Kai	2	2	203
22	El Lindaman	1	4	182
23	Tsuyoshi Kikuchi	1	2	175
24	Keisuke Ishii	1	3	152
24	Ryuji Hijikata	1	3	152
24	Minoru	1	1	152
27	Seigo Tachibana	1	0	144
28	Hiroshi Yamato	1	5	143
29	Sugi	2	4	137
30	Tajiri	2	3	133
31	Naomichi Marufuji	1	4	131
32	Rising Hayato	1	3	126
33	Joe Malenko	2	2	116
34	Hiro Saito	1	3	115
35	Musashi	1	2	112
36	Cima	1	2	109
37	Tiger Mask (IV)	1	3	91
37	Soma Takao	1	1	91
39	Seiki Yoshioka	1	2	84
40	Mitsuo Momota	1	2	72
41	Izanagi	1	0	61
42	Silver King	1	0	59
43	Mighty Inoue	1	2	42
44	Kuniaki Kobayashi	1	1	41
45	Akira Francesco	1	0	26
46	Super Crazy	1	0	18
47	Shinichi Nakano	1	0	4

== Belt design ==
The standard Championship belt has five plates on a black leather strap.

== See also ==
- NWA International Junior Heavyweight Championship (predecessor)
- AJPW Junior League
