= Masanobu Fuchi =

Japanese professional wrestler

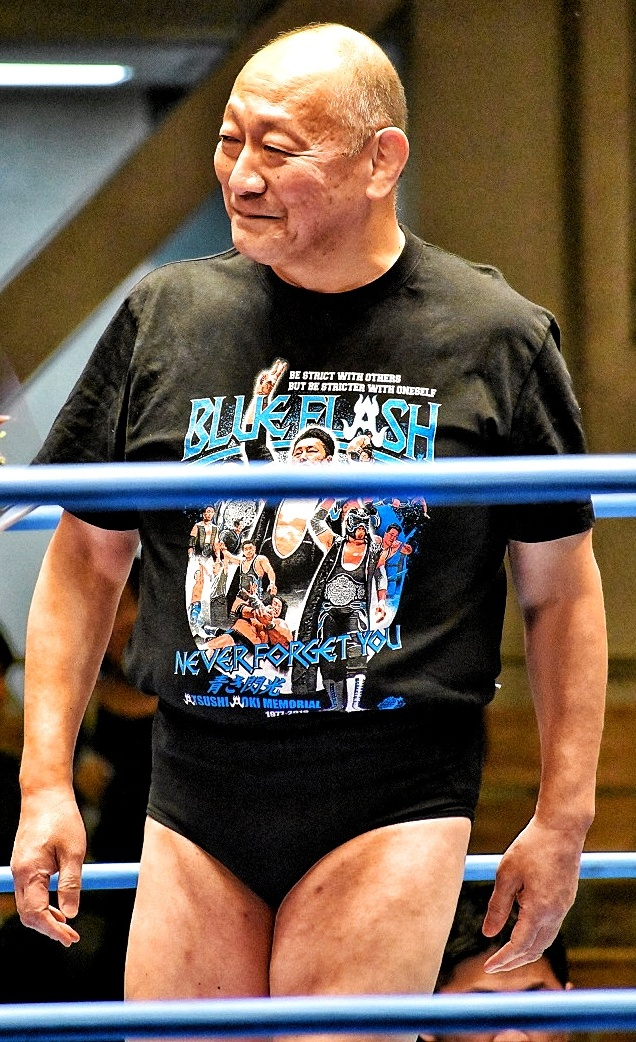
- Fuchi in 2019

Personal information
- Born: January 14, 1954 (age 72) Kitakyushu, Fukuoka, Japan

Professional wrestling career
- Ring name(s): Akaoni; Masa Fuchi; Masanobu Fuchi
- Billed height: 183 cm (6 ft 0 in)
- Billed weight: 105 kg (231 lb)
- Trained by: Masio Koma
- Debut: August 22, 1974

Masanobu Fuchi (渕 正信, Fuchi Masanobu; born January 14, 1954) is a Japanese professional wrestler signed to All Japan Pro Wrestling (AJPW), where he is also a director and the co-head booker. Fuchi has exclusively worked for All Japan since his debut in 1974, and holds the record for the longest World Junior Heavyweight Championship reign at 1,309 days. Fuchi became a freelancer in 2009, but officially re-signed with AJPW in 2013 as both a director and wrestler, making him the longest tenured member of the All Japan roster.

== Professional wrestling career ==
=== All Japan Pro Wrestling (1974–present) ===
With a background in amateur wrestling, Fuchi debuted as a professional wrestler on August 22, 1974, for AJPW, facing future Death Match innovator Atsushi Onita. For the next couple of years, Fuchi and Onita alternated between teaming and feuding on the opening bouts. In 1981, the two went on an excursion to Memphis, Tennessee to season their careers. Fuchi briefly worked for the NWA's Mid-Atlantic Championship Wrestling as a jobber who always showed a good account of himself.

Following Onita's retirement in 1985 and Tiger Mask II's graduation to the heavyweight division in 1986, Fuchi became the top junior heavyweight star, holding the World Junior Heavyweight Championship on five occasions spanning over 11 years. Fuchi's third reign spanned 4 years (1989–1993), but the fact that AJPW was relatively closed off to outside competition factored heavily in his lengthy third reign.

After losing the belt for the last time in 1996, Fuchi was relegated to the opening "legends" bouts, mostly in teams with Haruka Eigen opposing AJPW founder Giant Baba and Rusher Kimura. In 2000, when Mitsuharu Misawa defected from AJPW to form Pro Wrestling Noah, Fuchi was one of two (the other being Toshiaki Kawada) native wrestlers who remained with the promotion. As a result, Fuchi was pushed for a while into the upper regions of the card, teaming with Toshiaki Kawada and becoming a top contender for the World Tag Team Championship. Fuchi's first title in eight years was the All Asia Tag Team Championship with fellow veteran Genichiro Tenryu.

Fuchi became a director for the promotion soon after the arrival of Keiji Mutoh, a position that Fuchi still holds to this day. Fuchi still competes on a full-time basis for All-Japan Pro Wrestling, but usually in comedic preliminary bouts against rookie heavyweights and junior heavyweights. On August 20, 2006, Fuchi became a member of the Voodoo Murders stable, competing under a red mask as Akaoni. His tenure as Akaoni and with the stable only lasted for that evening, as Fuchi unmasked and helped fellow All Japan competitors attack the stable following the main event. From November 23 to December 9, 2007, Fuchi teamed with Osamu Nishimura to compete in the World's Strongest Tag Determination League, finishing the league with 7 points (2 wins, 2 losses and 3 draws) and placing 5th overall.

On June 21, 2013, it was revealed that Masanobu Fuchi had long since resigned from his position in the AJPW Board of Directors and hasn't had an exclusive contract since 2009 due to his age, thus becoming a freelancer, although he still wrestles for AJPW on a pay per performance basis. However, on July 14, during the launching event of the post-Keiji Mutoh All Japan, Fuchi appeared and announced that he had officially re-signed with the promotion not only as a wrestler, but also as a member of the Board of Directors, ending his tenure as a freelancer. Shortly afterwards, Fuchi also became the co-head booker of All Japan, alongside Jun Akiyama.

On November 27, 2016, Fuchi and fellow first class graduate Atsushi Onita defeated Atsushi Aoki and Hikaru Sato to become the 100th All Asia Tag Team Champions. It was Fuchi's first title in 12 years, and the combination's first title in 35 years, since their third and last AWA Southern title reign in Memphis in 1981. They lost the title back to Aoki and Sato on June 20, 2017.

As of 2024 and 50 years later, Fuchi stills wrestles at 70 years old.

=== North America (1981–1983) ===
From 1981 to 1983, Fuchi wrestled in North America for CWA in Tennessee, Florida for Championship Wrestling from Florida, Mid-Atlantic and Toronto. In March 1981, he and Atsushi Onita won the AWA Southern Tag Team Championship from Bill Dundee and The Dream Machine in Memphis only holding them for seven days as they dropped the titles back to Dundee and Dream Machine. That August, they won the titles again, defeating Bill Dundee and Jerry Lawler. They dropped them to Eddie Gilbert and Ricky Morton.

== Championships and accomplishments ==
- All Japan Pro Wrestling
  - All Asia Tag Team Championship (2 times) – with Genichiro Tenryu (1) and Atsushi Onita (1)
  - World Junior Heavyweight Championship (5 times)
- Continental Wrestling Association
  - AWA Southern Tag Team Championship (3 times) – with Mr. Onita
- National Wrestling Alliance
  - NWA World Junior Heavyweight Championship (1 time, unrecognized)
- Pro Wrestling Illustrated
  - PWI ranked him 323 of the 500 best singles wrestler during the "PWI Years" in 2003
- Tokyo Sports
  - Effort Award (1976, 1983)
