= Giant Baba Memorial Spectacular =

2001 professional wrestling memorial event

- Promotional poster featuring Giant Baba and Stan Hansen among various other AJPW and NJPW wrestlers
- Promotion(s): All Japan Pro Wrestling; New Japan Pro-Wrestling
- Date: January 28, 2001
- City: Tokyo, Japan
- Venue: Tokyo Dome
- Attendance: 58,700 (official); 30,000 (claimed)

Giant Baba Memorial chronology
← Previous; Giant Baba Memorial Show	Next → Giant Baba Memorial Cup

The Giant Baba Memorial Spectacular was a professional wrestling memorial event and pay-per-view co-produced by the All Japan Pro Wrestling (AJPW) and New Japan Pro-Wrestling (NJPW) promotions, which took place on January 28, 2001, at the Tokyo Dome in Tokyo, Japan. The event's Japanese name translates to "Kings Road New Century 2001" but it was commonly referred to in the Japanese and English language press as the "Giant Baba Memorial Spectacular." The event was themed around memorializing AJPW's founder Shohei "Giant" Baba, who had died in 1999. It was the second Giant Baba Memorial event and was subsequently followed by the Giant Baba Memorial Cup and the Giant Baba Memorial Six Man Tag Team Tournament a year later.

Ten professional wrestling matches were held on the event's card, including one that featured AJPW and NJPW champions. Six of the ten matches were aired on the initial broadcast. The last two matches on the card were dark matches to help sell out the stadium, with the main event on television being portrayed as Mike Barton (Bart Gunn) vs. "Dr. Death" Steve Williams in a revenge match over the WWF Brawl For All, which Williams ultimately won.

The show structure of the initial broadcast of the Giant Baba Memorial Spectacular is comparable to that of WWF In Your House 8: Beware of Dog, where Shawn Michaels vs. The British Bulldog (also the third-to-last match) was portrayed as the main event on television instead of the Owen Hart vs. Ultimate Warrior match, which was the actual last match played for the crowd in attendance.

The non-televised main event was an inter-promotional tag team "Dream Match" that pitted New Japan's IWGP Heavyweight Champion Kensuke Sasaki and All Japan's Toshiaki Kawada against AJPW Triple Crown Heavyweight Champion Genichiro Tenryu and Hiroshi Hase, a one-time star for New Japan and then-member of the Japanese parliament. Another featured bout was a tag team "Legends Match" that saw Terry Funk team with longtime rival Atsushi Onita to take on Abdullah the Butcher and Giant Kimala; Funk and Onita were victorious. The event featured two additional inter-promotional matches on the undercard; New Japan's Jushin Thunder Liger defeated All Japan's Masa Fuchi and New Japan's Keiji Mutoh beat All Japan's Taiyō Kea, the latter of which featured what is documented as the earliest usage of Mutoh's newest signature move, the Shining Wizard. In another prominent undercard match, the team of Johnny Smith, Jim Steele, and George Hines defeated Mike Rotunda, Curt Hennig, and Barry Windham (substituting for an injured Kendall Windham). The show also included the in-ring retirement ceremony for Stan Hansen, one of the most dominant gaijin heels in AJPW history. The ceremony featured appearances from several All Japan and New Japan alumni including Pete Roberts, Seiji Sakaguchi, The Destroyer, and Mil Máscaras.

Re-airings of the pay-per-view would later include the four dark matches.

== Results ==
No.	Results	Stipulations	Times
1^{D}	Dan Kroffat won by lastly eliminating Yuto Aijima (Note: Match also included Darkness Dragon, Genki Horiguchi, Gran Naniwa, Kyoshiro Suizenji, Nobukazu Hirai, Ryuji Hijikata, Shinobi, Stalker Ichikawa, Susumu Mochizuki, Taru, and Yasushi Kanda.)	Thirteen-man Battle Royal	26:14
2	Kim Duk and Shigeo Okumura defeated Yoshiaki Fujiwara and Nobutaka Araya	Tag team match	14:33
3	Mil Máscaras and El Hijo del Santo defeated Arkangel de la Muerte and Blue Panther	"Lucha Libre rules" tag team match	13:40
4	Masahito Kakihara and Mitsuya Nagai defeated Alexander Otsuka and Muhammad Yone	Tag team match	11:39
5	Johnny Smith, Jim Steele, and George Hines defeated Mike Rotunda, Curt Hennig, and Barry Windham	Tag team match	15:22
6^{D}	Jushin Thunder Liger (NJPW) defeated Masanobu Fuchi (AJPW)	Inter-promotional AJPW vs. NJPW singles match NJPW: 1, AJPW: 0	18:04
7	Terry Funk and Atsushi Onita defeated Abdullah the Butcher and Giant Kimala	Legends tag team match	08:26
8	"Dr. Death" Steve Williams defeated Mike Barton	Singles match	14:47
9^{D}	Keiji Mutoh (NJPW) defeated Taiyō Kea (AJPW)	Inter-promotional AJPW vs. NJPW singles match NJPW: 2, AJPW: 0	14:54
10^{D}	Kensuke Sasaki (c - IWGP Heavyweight Champion) and Toshiaki Kawada defeated Genichiro Tenryu (c - AJPW Triple Crown Heavyweight Champion) and Hiroshi Hase	Non-title Dream tag team match	23:48
D / – this was a dark match
