= Jimmy Yang =

Korean-American professional wrestler (born 1981)

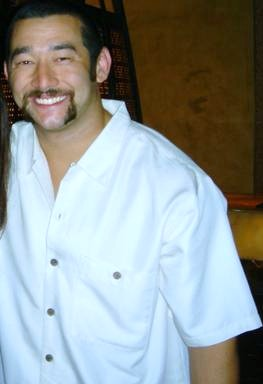
- Yun in 2007

Personal information
- Born: James Carson Yun; May 13, 1981 (age 45) Los Angeles, California, U.S.
- Children: 1

Professional wrestling career
- Ring name(s): Akio; Akio Yang; Apeman; Jimmy Yang; Jimmy Wang Yang; Yun Yang
- Billed height: 5 ft 9 in (1.75 m)
- Billed weight: 206 lb (93 kg)
- Billed from: Austell, Georgia
- Trained by: WCW Power Plant
- Debut: June 1999
- Retired: January 2025

James Carson Yun (born May 13, 1981) is an American professional wrestler. He is best known for his tenures in World Championship Wrestling and World Wrestling Federation/World Wrestling Entertainment from 1999 to 2010, under the ring names Jimmy Yang, Akio and Jimmy Wang Yang.

Yun was trained in the Power Plant, the World Championship Wrestling farm territory. He worked in WCW until its closure in 2001. During the following years, he worked for several promotions. In the United States, he worked with NWA Total Nonstop Action (where he was part of the promotion's first match) or Ring of Honor, but most notably with World Wrestling Entertainment, where he had three different stints from 2001 to 2002, 2003 to 2005 and 2006 to 2010. During his last stint, he wrestled as Jimmy Wang Yang, an Asian-American cowboy and redneck.

He also starred in All Japan Pro Wrestling, where he won the World's Strongest Junior Tag League in 2002 with Kaz Hayashi and the Junior League in 2010.

== Early life ==
Yun was born in Hollywood, California, to a German mother and an American father of Korean descent. His father was in the U.S. Army, stationed in Germany, where he met his future wife. Yun grew up in Austell, Georgia, and has three sisters and one brother.

== Professional wrestling career ==
=== World Championship Wrestling (1999–2001) ===
In June 1999, Yun signed with World Championship Wrestling, making his WCW television debut in January 2000 under the ring name "Jimmy Yang". He was originally a part of the Jung Dragons faction along with Jamie-San and Kaz Hayashi. They were brought into WCW by Jimmy Hart to feud with 3 Count, another faction. They made their pay-per-view debut at New Blood Rising, losing a ladder match to 3 Count. They added a manager, Leia Meow, and continued the feud with 3 Count, until, in late 2000, Jamie-San unmasked and left the group, becoming known as Jamie Knoble and forming a tag team with former 3 Count member Evan Karagias. The team of Hayashi and Yang feuded with Knoble and Karagias until the WWF purchased WCW.

=== World Wrestling Federation (2001) ===
In March 2001, the World Wrestling Federation acquired Yun's contract and assigned him to the company's Heartland Wrestling Association developmental territory, but he was released in December 2001.

=== All Japan Pro Wrestling (2002) ===
In 2002, Yun joined All Japan Pro Wrestling where he wrestled as both a part of its tag team division and its singles junior heavyweight division. On April 13, 2002, Yun, competing as Yang, teamed up with Kaz Hayashi and Hi69 to defeat Kazushi Miyamoto, Gran Naniwa, and Ryuji Hijikata. On July 17 on an AJPW pay-per-view, Yang teamed up with Hayashi and George Hines to defeat Ryuji Hijikata, Gran Naniwa, and Johnny Smith. Over a month later, Yang returned to AJPW on August 31, teaming with Masaaki Mochizuki and Dragon Kid to defeat Magnum Tokyo, Susumu Yokosuka, and Darkness Dragon. Yang suffered his first loss in AJPW on September 15, when he and Kazushi Miyamoto lost to Kendo Kashin and Robbie Brookside, although that same month he teamed with Kaz Hayashi to win the Real World Junior Heavyweight Tag Team League. The following month, Yang defeated Gran Hamada and Gran Naniwa in a three-way match, before he and Yoji Anjoh lost to Mike Barton and Jim Steele. Throughout the end of 2002, Yang continued competing in six-man tag team matches, with mixed results.

=== NWA Total Nonstop Action (2002–2003) ===
From May to August 2002, Yang was one third of the Flying Elvises in NWA Total Nonstop Action (NWA TNA) alongside Sonny Siaki and Jorge Estrada. Yang and the other Elvises were involved in TNA's first match, defeating A.J. Styles, Jerry Lynn, and Low Ki in a six-man tag team match. Yang continued wrestling for TNA as a singles competitor through to January 2003.

=== Independent circuit (2002–2003) ===
On December 20, 2002 Yang made his Major League Wrestling debut at King of Kings, where he and Mike Sanders lost to "Dr. Death" Steve Williams and PJ Friedman. He competed regularly in MLW throughout 2003, both in singles and tag team competition. At the War Games and J Cup USA show on September 19, 2003, Yang competed in the Super J Cup USA tournament, defeating Juventud Guerrera in the first round, but losing to Christopher Daniels in the second.

=== Return to WWE (2003–2005) ===
In September 2003, following a match with Tommy Dreamer on Sunday Night Heat, Yun was signed to a three-year developmental deal with the renamed World Wrestling Entertainment (WWE). Yun made his WWE debut on October 19, 2003 at No Mercy, along with the Japanese American Ryan Sakoda. Yun was renamed Akio (a reference to Japanese wrestler Akio Sato) and aligned himself with Sakoda, forming the villainous tag team Kyo Dai, the henchmen of the native Japanese wrestler Tajiri. Sakoda was eventually released from WWE and Tajiri was traded to Raw.

This left Yun on his own to become a lower card wrestler and Velocity mainstay, competing primarily in the cruiserweight division until he was released on July 5, 2005.

=== Ring of Honor (2005–2006) ===
After being released from WWE, Yun wrestled in Ring of Honor (ROH). He debuted on October 1, 2005, at the New Yorker Hotel in Manhattan, losing to James Gibson. He lost once again the following night to Christopher Daniels and again two weeks later to Roderick Strong, causing him to kayfabe take some time away from the company.

He returned to ROH in January 2006 where he recorded his first win in ROH, teaming with Matt Sydal and Jack Evans in the Trios Tournament. The team, however, was ultimately defeated by The Embassy. Yun stayed with the company for several months, wrestling as Jimmy Yang and using the same martial arts based persona he adopted in WCW. His entrance music was the theme from the film The Last Dragon, and he brought in the film's star Taimak (referred to in his appearances as 'Bruce Leroy', the name of his character) to help him in a feud with Embassy member Jimmy Rave.

=== Second return to WWE (2006–2010) ===
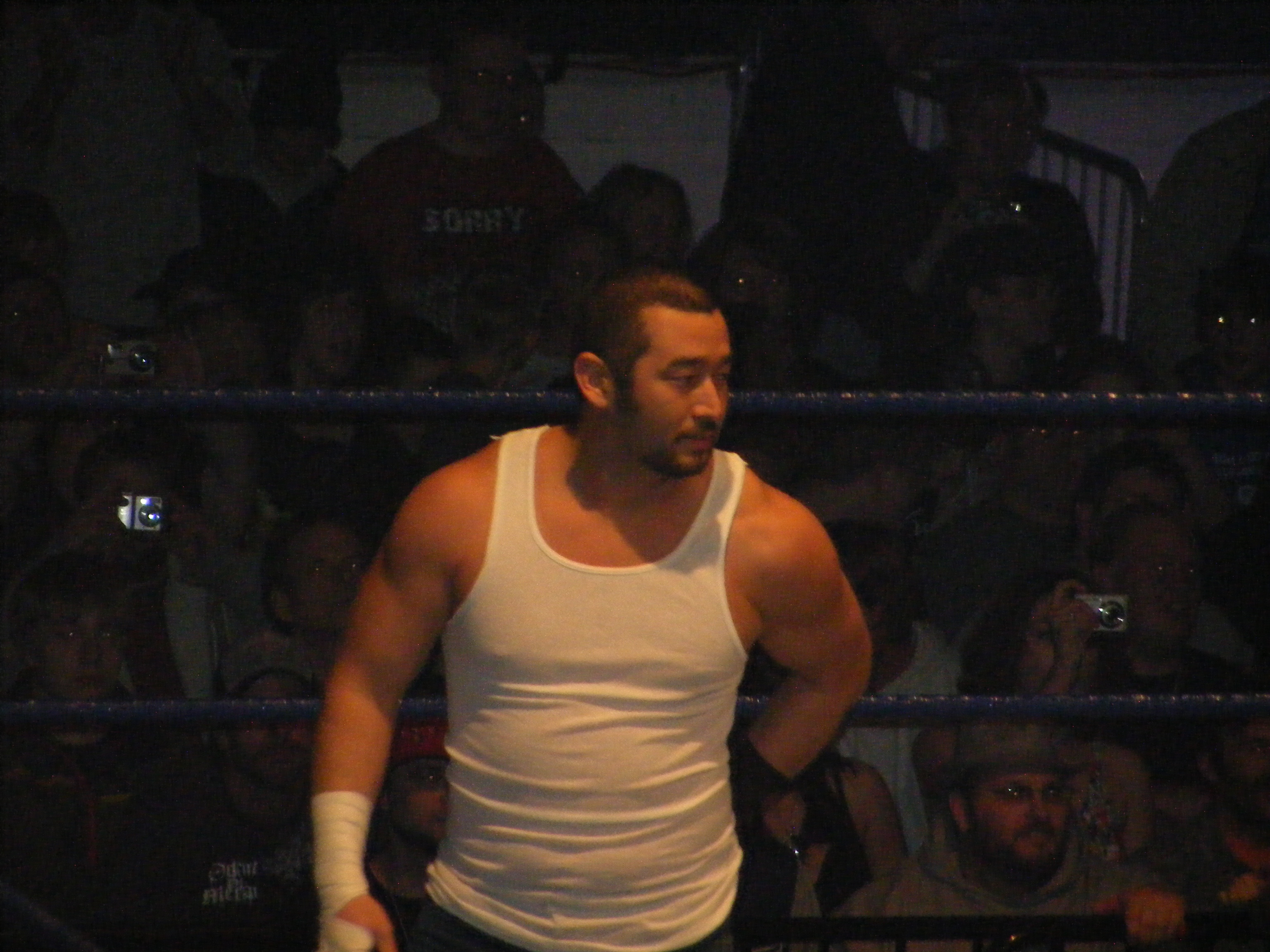
Jimmy Wang Yang in 2009

According to Yun, he was re-signed by WWE when he assisted an event and met Vince McMahon, who forgot Yun was released, so he re-hired him. Beginning with the August 25, 2006 edition of SmackDown!, vignettes began airing featuring Yun under the gimmick of Jimmy Wang Yang, a redneck cowboy. He was initially managed by Amy Zidian, a contestant in that year's WWE Diva Search, who only managed him for a month. He worked on the cruiserweight division, wrestling for the Cruiserweight Championship at Armageddon, No Way Out, Vengeance: Night of Champions, and The Great American Bash.

On the October 12 episode of SmackDown!, Jamie Noble, in order to weed out the competition for the vacant Cruiserweight Championship, told Deuce 'n Domino that Yang had been making "lewd remarks" about Domino's on-screen sister and manager, Cherry. Deuce demanded a match against Yang from acting General Manager Vickie Guerrero. Yang won the match with his signature moonsault from the top rope, but was attacked by Deuce, Domino, and Cherry after the match. The next week, Yang and Shannon Moore teamed up against Deuce 'n Domino in a tag team match, which Yang and Moore won. On the December 18 episode of ECW, Yang and Moore defeated the WWE Tag Team Champions John Morrison and the Miz to earn a title-shot, igniting a feud between the two teams. On the January 1, 2008 episode of ECW, Yang and Moore once again beat Morrison and the Miz, this time in a six-person tag team match also involving Layla and Kelly Kelly. The following week, in a Fifteen Minutes of Fame Match, Moore and Yang tied the champions on pinfalls, resulting in Miz and Morrison retaining the titles.

On June 9, 2008, Yun was suspended for thirty days for his first violation of the WWE Wellness Policy. He made his return on the July 18 edition of SmackDown, being defeated by the repackaged The Brian Kendrick. In late 2009, Yang formed a tag team with Slam Master J and in their first match as a team, they lost to The Hart Dynasty on the December 10 episode of Superstars. On the December 18 episode of SmackDown, Yang and J lost a rematch to the Dynasty. On the January 14, 2010 episode of Superstars, Yang and J scored their first win as a team after they defeated Mike Knox and Charlie Haas. Jimmy Wang Yang's last match in WWE was a dark match at WrestleMania XXVI took part in a 26-man Battle Royal, that was won by Yoshi Tatsu. On April 22, 2010, Yun was released from his WWE contract.

=== Independent circuit (2010–2013, 2016–present) ===
In May 2010, after being released by WWE, Yun returned to the independent circuit as Jimmy Yang and was announced to be part of the new HighSpots Pro Wrestling Superstars talent booking roster.

On July 25, 2010, Yun, as Jimmy Yang, returned to All Japan Pro Wrestling to take part in the 2010 Junior League. Yang finished second in his block, after victories over Shuji Kondo, MAZADA and Taka Michinoku, and advanced to the semifinals of the tournament. On August 8 Yang first defeated Minoru in the semifinals and then KAI in the finals to win the 2010 Junior Heavyweight League. With his victory Yang had earned a shot at the World Junior Heavyweight Championship, but was defeated in his title match on August 29 by the defending champion, Yang's former tag team partner, Kaz Hayashi.

=== Return to TNA (2011) ===
On June 27, 2011, Yang made a one night return to TNA at the tapings of the June 30 edition of Impact Wrestling, working in his old Flying Elvis gimmick and losing to Low Ki in a three–way first round match of a tournament for a TNA contract, which also included Matt Bentley.

=== Third return to WWE (2021) ===
Yun returned to the WWE as a backstage producer on October 25, 2021 during the live Raw broadcast. On December 28, Yun announced that WWE released him from his producer role.

== Personal life ==
Yun has a brother named Johnathan, who is a professional breakdancer. He also has a daughter named Jazmine, who is also a professional wrestler. He owned a professional wrestling school called Pro Training, LLC. located in Cincinnati, Ohio. In late October 2010, Yun started a pest control business called "Jimmy's Pest Control" in the Cincinnati area. He owned party bus businesses called "Redneck Party Bus" and "Princess Party Bus".

Yun is currently dating former WWE wrestler Krissy Vaine.

== Other media ==
Yun appears in the 2009 film Royal Kill as a police officer.

Yun made his WWE video game debut in WWE SmackDown vs. Raw 2009. He appears in the video game King of Colosseum Red released in 2002.

== Championships and accomplishments ==
- All Japan Pro Wrestling
  - Junior League (2010)
  - Bape Sta!! Tag Tournament (2003) – with Satoshi Kojima
  - World's Strongest Junior Tag League (2002) – with Kaz Hayashi
- Pro Wrestling Illustrated
  - Ranked No. 110 of the top 500 wrestlers in the PWI 500 in 2007
