= Giant Baba Memorial Six Man Tag Team Tournament =

2002 professional wrestling event

- Promotion: All-Japan Pro Wrestling
- Date: April 13-May 12, 2002
- City: Tokyo, Japan
- Venue: Nippon Budokan; Iwate Prefectural Gym; Niigata City Gym; Korakuen Hall
- Attendance: 16,000 (April 13); 2,100 (April 27); 2,700 (April 30); 3,150 (May 1)

chronology
← Previous; Giant Baba Memorial Cup	Next → Last

The Giant Baba (Hai Sodatsu) Memorial Six Man Tag Team Tournament, or simply the Giant Baba Six Man Cup, was a professional wrestling memorial event produced by the All-Japan Pro Wrestling (AJPW) promotion, which took place from April 13 to May 12, 2002, at the Nippon Budokan, Iwate Prefectural Gym, Niigata City Gym and Korakuen Hall in Tokyo, Japan. It was the third and final event honoring AJPW founder Shohei "Giant" Baba, the previous shows being the Giant Baba Memorial Spectacular and Giant Baba Memorial Cup in January 2001 and 2002 respectively. Seven professional wrestling matches were held over a three-week period, with both the tournament semi-finals and final match held at Korakuen Hall.

Keiji Muto, Kaz Hayashi and George Hines won the tournament by winning three matches all aired on pay-per-view. Over the course of the tournament, they defeated Satoshi Kojima, Tomoaki Honma and Jimmy Yang in the quarter-finals, Taiyō Kea, Mitsuya Nagai and Shigeo Okumura in the semi-finals and Genichiro Tenryu, Arashi and Nobutaka Araya in the final match. Earlier in the semi-finals, between Genichiro Tenryu's team and "Dr. Death" Steve Williams, Mike Rotunda and Yoji Anjo, Anjo accidentally hit Rotunda in the face with a back-fist punch which eventually led to their defeat. Blaming Anjo for the loss, Williams turned his back on Anjoh causing a split between the two former teammates.

== Results ==
No.	Results	Stipulations	Times
1	"Dr. Death" Steve Williams, Mike Rotunda and Yoji Anjo defeated Mike Barton, Jim Steele and Cedman	Giant Baba Memorial Cup quarter-final match	16:16
2	Genichiro Tenryu, Arashi and Nobutaka Araya defeated Kendo Kashin, Johnny Smith and Abdullah the Butcher	Giant Baba Memorial Cup quarter-final match	19:11
3	Keiji Muto, Kaz Hayashi and George Hines defeated Satoshi Kojima, Tomoaki Honma and Jimmy Yang	Giant Baba Memorial Cup quarter-final match	13:35
4	Taiyō Kea, Mitsuya Nagai and Shigeo Okumura defeated Masa Fuchi, Hideki Hosaka and Gran Naniwa	Giant Baba Memorial Cup quarter-final match	18:50
5	Genichiro Tenryu, Arashi and Nobutaka Araya defeated Steve Williams, Mike Rotunda and Yoji Anjo	Giant Baba Memorial Cup semi-final match	—
6	Keiji Muto, Kaz Hayashi and George Hines defeated Taiyo Kea, Mitsuya Nagai and Shigeo Okumura	Giant Baba Memorial Cup semi-final match	—
7	Keiji Muto, Kaz Hayashi and George Hines defeated Genichiro Tenryu, Arashi and Nobutaka Araya	Giant Baba Memorial Cup final match	—

=== Tournament brackets ===
The tournament took place between April 13 and May 12, 2002. The tournament brackets were:

Quarterfinals
Steve Williams, Mike Rotunda and Yoji Anjo	Pin
Mike Barton, Jim Steele and Cedman
Genichiro Tenryu, Arashi and Nobutaka Araya	Pin
Kendo Kashin, Johnny Smith and Abdullah the Butcher
Keiji Muto, Kaz Hayashi and George Hines	Pin
Satoshi Kojima, Tomoaki Honma and Jimmy Yang
Taiyo Kea, Mitsuya Nagai and Shigeo Okumura	Pin
Masa Fuchi, Hideki Hosaka and Gran Naniwa

Semifinals
Steve Williams, Mike Rotunda and Yoji Anjoh
Genichiro Tenryu, Arashi and Nobutaka Araya	Pin
Keiji Muto, Kaz Hayashi and George Hines	Pin
Taiyo Kea, Mitsuya Nagai and Shigeo Okumura

Final
Genichiro Tenryu, Arashi and Nobutaka Araya
Keiji Muto, Kaz Hayashi and George Hines	Pin
