= Jackie Fulton =

American professional wrestler (born 1963)

Personal information
- Born: George Hines; June 1, 1963 (age 63) Chillicothe, Ohio, U.S.

Professional wrestling career
- Ring name(s): American Eagle; The Eagle; George Hines; Jackie Fulton; Jackie Hines
- Billed height: 6 ft 1 in (1.85 m)
- Billed weight: 242 lb (110 kg; 17.3 st)
- Debut: 1987
- Retired: 2006

George Hines (born June 1, 1963) is an American retired professional wrestler, best known by his ringname Jackie Fulton, who competed in regional and independent promotions including the American Wrestling Association, East Coast Championship Wrestling, the National Wrestling Alliance, World Championship Wrestling and, most notably, his brief but memorable stint in Smoky Mountain Wrestling where he teamed with his real life brother Bobby Fulton as The Fantastics.

Throughout the 1990s, he also carved out a successful career overseas competing in All Japan Pro Wrestling and IWA Japan both under his real name as well as the masked wrestler The Eagle. In recent years, he has also competed in American independent promotions as the masked wrestler American Eagle.

== Professional wrestling career ==
=== Early career (1987–1992) ===
Born in Columbus, Ohio, Hines eventually entered professional wrestling in 1987, joining his older brother Bobby Fulton a decade after his own debut in 1977. In early 1989, he began wrestling in televised matches for the Continental Wrestling Federation based in Alabama. During his time in the area, he formed a short-lived tag team with Nightmare Danny Davis and gained a title shot at the then CWF Tag Team Champions The Japanese Connection (Mr. Chono and RPM) in May 1989.

After Bobby Fulton and Tommy Rogers left the NWA and split up, he joined his brother later that year in the American Wrestling Association where they briefly feuded with then AWA Tag Team champions The Destruction Crew (Mike Enos and Wayne Bloom). He and Bobby Fulton also had a short run in the NWA and wrestled as both The Fantastics and The Fantastic Ones on the independent circuit.

During this time, Hines also competed in Jim Crockett Promotions and, teaming with Terry Taylor against The Nasty Boys (Brian Knobs and Jerry Sags) at Clash of the Champions XII, he was pinned by Sags.

Staying with the organization during the next year or two, his exposure increased during the promotion's eventual transition to World Championship Wrestling although he was often used as a preliminary wrestler against veterans such as Nikita Koloff to whom he lost to on WCW Worldwide in Tallahassee, Florida, on August 3, 1991. One of his wins, however, was against future superstar Bob Holly.

=== Smoky Mountain Wrestling (1992) ===
In early 1992, he and Bobby Fulton began teaming together as the second incarnation of The Fantastics, formerly composed of Bobby Fulton and Tommy Rogers. Appearing on the earliest episodes of SMW's weekly television show, he and Bobby Fulton fought Ivan and Vladimir Koloff in a brief feud during early March.

Entering a championship tournament to crown the first SMW Tag Team Champions, they would advance to the finals before being eliminated by the Heavenly Bodies (Stan Lane & Tom Prichard) in Harrogate, Tennessee, on April 23, 1992. On July 2, he would also win a 12-man battle royal in Paintsville, Kentucky. The participants included Bobby Fulton, Robert Gibson, Joe Cazana, "Dirty White Boy" Tony Anthony, Dixie Dynamite, Jimmy Golden, Tim Horner, Buddy Landel, Brian Lee and the Heavenly Bodies. He and Bobby Fulton would also tour Japan losing to André the Giant, Mighty Inoue & Yoshinari Ogawa in a 6-man tag team match with The Patriot in Hamamatsu, Japan on May 30 and, with Johnny Ace, lost in a rematch three days later in Fukushima, Japan.

Feuding with the Heavenly Bodies and their manager James E. Cornette throughout the summer, they briefly captured the SMW Tag Team Championship from the Heavenly Bodies defeating them in Johnson City, Tennessee, on August 8 before dropping the belts back to them in Benton, Tennessee, two days later. Splitting up soon after, Hines eventually left the promotion and traveled the independent circuit for a short time before moving on to Japan later that year.

=== All Japan Pro Wrestling (1992–2005) ===
==== The Eagle (1992–1997) ====
In 1992, he began competing in Japan as The Eagle, forming a successful tag team with The Patriot. They competed in the 1992 and 1993 World's Strongest Tag Determination League as well as winning the All Asia Tag Team Championship from Tsuyoshi Kikuchi & Kenta Kobashi in Koyama, Japan on June 2, 1993. After losing the titles to Doug Furnas & Dan Kroffat on September 9, The Patriot left AJPW for World Championship Wrestling while Hines began teaming with The Falcon together competing in the 1994 World's Strongest Tag Determination League.

==== Various appearances (1999–2005) ====
By 1999, he had become a regular in All Japan Pro Wrestling competing under his real name. Appearing on televised matches aired on Nippon TV, Hines teamed with Wolf Hawkfield against Giant Kimala & Tamon Honda at the Super Power Series supercard at the Sendai Miyagi-ken Sports Center on June 9. During the Summer Action Series, he faced Akira Taue & Toshiaki Kawada & Hiroshi Hase in a 6-man tag team match with Johnny Ace and Mike Burton at Korakuen Hall on August 22. Several days later, he and Johnny Ace teamed against Takao Omori & Yoshihiro Takayama at the Wakayama Kenritsu Taiikukan on August 28 as well as facing Yoshinari Ogawa in a singles match at the Osaka Chou Taiikukan the following night. In April 2000, substituting for an injured Reno Riggins, he and Steven Dunn defended the NWA World Tag Team Championship losing the title to The Rock 'n' Roll Express (Ricky Morton & Robert Gibson) in Waegwan, South Korea.

The following year, he appeared on the undercard of the Giant Baba Memorial Spectacular teaming with Johnny Smith and Jim Steele in a 6-man tag team match defeating Mike Rotunda, Curt Hennig and Barry Windham (substituting for Kendall Windham) at the Tokyo Dome on January 28, 2001.

He participated in All Japan Pro Wrestling's Champion Carnival tournament facing Mike Barton, Toshiaki Kawada, Taiyō Kea, Johnny Smith, Jim Steele, Steve Williams, Gen'ichiro Tenryu and Yoshiaki Fujiwara between March 23 and April 8.

During the next several months, he appeared in high-profile matches at Budokan Hall and was pinned by Satoshi Kojima during a tag team match Steve Williams against Kojima & Hiroyoshi Tenzan on April 14. He later teamed with Mike Barton to defeat Nobutaka Araya & Shigeo Okumura on June 8 as well defeating Yoshiaki Fujiwara, Yuto Aijima & Ryuji Hijikata in a 6-man tag team match with Kasey Geyer and Shawn Hernandez after pinning Aijima on July 14. Later that year, he teamed with Jim Steele & Vampiro losing to Hiroshi Hase, Steve Williams & Mike Rotunda on September 8.

At AJPW's "29th Anniversary Show" at Budokan Hall on October 27, George Hines, Johnny Smith and Kazushi Miyamoto defeated Masato Tanaka, Ryuji Hijikata and Nobukazu Hirai when Hines pinned Hirai. With Johnny Smith and Vampiro, Hines also beat Arashi, Nobukazu Hirai and Koki Kitahara on December 7, 2001.

On February 24, 2002, he defeated Yoji Anjoh, Arashi, & Nobutaka Araya in a 6-man match with Mike Barton and Jim Steele. The following month, during a Japanese PPV event, he and Tomoaki Honma lost to Hiroshi Hase & Hideki Hosaka on April 13. A few weeks later, he teamed with Kaz Hayashi and Keiji Mutoh to win the Giant Baba Memorial Six Man Tag Team Tournament. He and Johnny Smith also participated tag team match on July 20 against Mike Barton and Jim Steele, Steve Williams & Mike Rotunda and Brian Adams & Bryan Clark. After nearly half an hour, the match was eventually won by Mike Barton & Jim Steele after Barton pinned Rotunda.

On August 30, in a 2-day PPV event at Budokan Hall, Hines teamed with Johnny Smith and Gran Hamada to defeat Steve Williams, Mike Rotunda & Gran Naniwa when Hines pinned Naniwa. The following night, Hines was featured in the main event facing Genichiro Tenryu, Steve Williams, Arashi, Koki Kitahara, & Masao Orihara in a 10-man tag team "elimination" match with Keiji Mutoh, Hiroshi Hase, Jinsei Shinzaki and Kaz Hayashi. Pinned by Arashi, he was the second man to be eliminated and his team eventually lost the match with Genichiro Tenryu and Steve Williams as the survivors. Hines would again appear on a live PPV broadcast during AJPW's "30th Anniversary Show" at Budokan Hall teaming with Mike Barton and Jim Steele to defeat Arashi, Nobutaka Araya and Nobukazu Hirai on October 27, 2002.

On April 3, he was pinned by Satoshi Kojima during a tag team match with Keiji Mutoh against Kojima & Jimmy Yang at the Tomioka-cho Gym in Fukushima, Japan. The following night at Fukushima's "Big Palette" in Kooriyama City, he teamed with Satoshi Kojima and Kaz Hayashi losing to Genichiro Tenryu, Arashi, & Nobutaka Araya in a 6-man tag team match after being pinned by Arashi. On April 5, he and Gigantes teamed to defeat Tomoaki Honma & Kazushi Miyamoto at the Nagaoka City Welfare Hall in Niigata, Japan.

Continuing to team with Gigantes, the two also defeated Hiroshi Hase & Masayuki Kono at Budokan Hall on April 12. Two months later, he teamed with "Big" John Tenta & Robbie Brookside to defeat Hiroshi Hase, Masayuki Kono & Shigeo Okumura in a PPV event at Budokan Hall on July 19, 2003.

Hines would also have a brief stint in IWA Japan and, in August 2004, entered a championship tournament for the IWA Japan Heavyweight Championship advancing to the quarterfinals before being eliminated by The Barbarian.

Returning to AJPW in early 2005, he teamed with Mike Barton and Jim Steele to defeat Jamal, Chuck Palumbo & Rodney Mack (14:02) at the "Giant Baba Farewell" supercard on February 5, 2005.

Hines is a playable character in the 2004 video game King of Colosseum II.

=== Later career ===
Returning to the United States, he and his brother Bobby Fulton came out of retirement for a one-time appearance against The Assassins at an event for Big Time Wrestling on September 2, 2006. He retired shortly thereafter. Hines is reuniting with his brother Bobby Fulton on April 12, 2019, at the NCWA's Chair City Clash in tag team action against George South and Dangerous E.

== Championships and accomplishments ==
- All Japan Pro Wrestling
  - All Asia Tag Team Championship (1 time) – with The Patriot
  - Giant Baba Six Man Cup (2002) - with Keiji Mutoh & Kaz Hayashi
  - Korakuen Hall Heavyweight Battle Royal (January 2, 2002)
- Big Time Wrestling
  - BTW Ohio Tag Team Championship (1 time) - with Bobby Fulton
- Smoky Mountain Wrestling
  - SMW Tag Team Championship (1 time) - with Bobby Fulton
- Pro Wrestling Illustrated
  - PWI ranked him # 272 of the 500 best singles wrestlers of the PWI 500 in 1991.
