= Giant Baba Memorial Cup =

- Promotion: All-Japan Pro Wrestling
- Date: January 2-January 14, 2002
- City: Tokyo, Fukuoka, Nagasaki, Kagoshima, Osaka and Yokohama
- Venue: Korakuen Hall (January 2–3); Hakata Star Lane (January 5); Nagasaki NCC Studio (January 6); Sasebo Sports Bunka Hall (January 7); Kokura Northern Gymnasium (January 8); Kagoshima Prefectural Gymnasium (January 9); Osaka Central Gymnasium (January 11); Yokohama Bunka Gym (January 14)
- Attendance: 2,000 (January 2–3); 2,200 (January 5); 650 (January 6); 1,600 (January 7); 1,200 (January 8); 1,350 (January 9); 1,500 (January 11); 4,800 (January 14)

chronology
← Previous; Giant Baba Memorial Spectacular	Next → Giant Baba Memorial Six Man Tag Team Tournament

The Giant Baba Memorial Cup was a professional wrestling memorial event produced by the All-Japan Pro Wrestling (AJPW) promotion, which took place from January 2 to January 14, 2002, at Korakuen Hall in Tokyo, Hakata Star Lane in Fukuoka, the Nagasaki NCC Studio, Sasebo Sports Bunka Hall, Kokura Northern Gymnasium, Kagoshima Prefectural Gymnasium, Osaka Central Gymnasium, and the Bunka Gym in Yokohama, Japan. It was the second event held in honor of AJPW founder Shohei "Giant" Baba preceding the Giant Baba Memorial Spectacular in 2001 and was followed by the Giant Baba Memorial Six Man Tag Team Tournament three months later. Thirty-one professional wrestling matches were featured on AJPW's "New Year Giant Series" tour over a three-week period, with the opening rounds, semi-finals and the final match airing on Gaora TV.

The Giant Baba Memorial Cup, held as a round robin tournament, had a uniquely different point system traditionally used by the Champion Carnival or World's Strongest Tag Determination League. Winners were awarded points on the duration of the match rather than simply defeating an opponent.

- A match under 5:00 min. would receive 5 points.
- A match under 10:00 min. would receive 4 points.
- A match under 15:00 min. would receive 3 points.
- A match under 20:00 min. would receive 2 points.
- A match ending in 20:00 min. time-limit draw would receive 1 point.

The participants were separated into two separate blocks; Shigeo Okumura, Nobukazu Hirai, Hideki Hosaka, Hi69, Mitsuya Nagai and Ryuji Hijikata were in "Block A" and Nobutaka Araya, Yaz Urano, Tomoaki Honma, Gran Naniwa, Kazushi Miyamoto, and Masato Tanaka were in "Block B". The winners of each block, Mitsuya Nagai and Nobutaka Araya, faced each other in the tournament finals at the Yokohama Bunka Gym on January 14, 2002.

== Results ==
The Giant Baba Memorial Cup was a round-robin tournament consisting of two six-man blocks, and running from January 2 to January 14, 2002.

Final standings
Block A		Block B	
Mitsuya Nagai	24	Nobutaka Araya	21
Shigeo Okumura	14	Masato Tanaka	19
Nobukazu Hirai	11	Tomoaki Honma	8
Hideki Hosaka	8	Kazushi Miyamoto	8
Ryuji Hijikata	8	Gran Naniwa	7
Hi69	0	Yasu Urano	0

Block A	Mitsuya Nagai	Nobukazu Hirai	Ryuji Hijikata	Hi69	Shigeo Okumura	Hideki Hosaka
Mitsuya Nagai	X	Nagai (4:27)	Nagai (1:59)	Nagai (3:00)	Nagai (2:19)	Nagai (7:16)
Nobukazu Hirai	Nagai (4:27)	X	Fujiwara (9:14)	Hirai (5:18)	Nagai (15:58)	Hirai (4:30)
Ryuji Hijikata	Nagai (1:59)	Hijikata (9:05)	X	Hijikata (7:41)	Okumura (4:23)	Hosaka (10:33)
Hi69	Nagai (3:00)	Harai (5:18)	Hikata (7:41)	X	Okumura (2:27)	Hosaka (2:09)
Shigeo Okumura	Nagai (2:19)	Hirai (15:58)	Okumura (14:23)	Okumura (2:27)	X	Okumura (5:13)
Hideki Hosaka	Nagai (7:16)	Hirai (4:30)	Hosaka (10:33)	Hosaka (2:09)	Okumura (5:13)	X
Block B	Kazushi Miyamoto	Masato Tanaka	Tomoaki Honma	Yasu Urano	Gran Naniwa	Nobutaka Araya
Kazushi Miyamoto	X	Tanaka (5:54)	Homna (7:13)	Miyamoto (8:54)	Miyamoto (8:06)	Araya (2:08)
Masato Tanaka	Tanaka (5:54)	X	Tanaka (7:16)	Tanaka (4:16)	Tanaka (3:17)	Draw (20:00)
Tomoaki Honma	Homna (7:13)	Tanaka (7:16)	X	Honma (8:16)	Naniwa (12:24)	Araya (1:14)
Yasu Urano	Miyamoto (8:54)	Tanaka (4:16)	Honma (8:16)	X	Naniwa (6:37)	Araya (1:48)
Gran Naniwa	Miyamoto (8:06)	Tanaka (3:17)	Naniwa (12:24)	Naniwa (6:37)	X	Araya (3:29)
Nobutaka Araya	Araya (2:08)	Draw (20:00)	Araya (1:14)	Araya (1:48)	Araya (3:29)	X

Final
A1	Mitsuya Nagai	Sub
B1	Nobutaka Araya	18:35
