= Mike Barton and Jim Steele =

Professional wrestling tag team

Tag team
- Members: Mike Barton; Jim Steele
- Billed heights: Barton: 6 ft 3 in (1.91 m); Steele: 6 ft 3 in (1.91 m)
- Combined billed weight: 488 lb (221 kg; 34.9 st)
- Debut: 2000
- Disbanded: 2005

The tag team of Mike Barton and Jim Steele was a professional wrestling tag team that competed in several puroresu promotions including All Japan Pro Wrestling and New Japan Pro-Wrestling.

== History ==
=== All Japan Pro Wrestling (2000-2002) ===
Barton and Steele began teaming in the summer of 2000 after the Pro Wrestling NOAH exodus as Barton and Steele both remained with All Japan. In late 2000, Barton and Steele entered the 2000 World's Strongest Tag Determination League tournament where they finished in 4th place with 10 points.

On January 2, 2001, Barton won the yearly January 2 Korakuen Hall heavyweight battle royal. In March, Steele entered the 2001 Champion Carnival Qualifying League where he tied in first place with Mitsuya Nagai with 8 points. At the 2001 Champions Carnival, Both Barton and Steele entered the tournament. In the end, Steele finished in 8th place with 2 points while Barton finished 5th with 13 points. After the Carnival, Barton and Steele would have a quiet spring and summer, but in the fall entered the All Japan branch of Masahiro Chono's stable: Team 2000. In November, Steele entered World Wrestling Council where he won the WWC Puerto Rican Championship. Later that month, Barton and Steele entered the 2001 G1 Tag League, where they became the runners-up losing to Tencozy in the finals.

In early 2002, New Japan and All Japan ended their relationship and as a result, Barton and Steele returned to All Japan. On January 14, Barton and Steele received their first shot at the World Tag Team Championship, challenging Keiji Mutoh and Taiyo Kea but lost. In the spring, Barton and Steele entered the 2002 Champions Carnival with both being in Block A. Steele finished 3rd with 6 points while Barton became the runner up losing to Mutoh in the finals. On July 20, Barton and Steele won Stan Hansen Cup 4 way battle defeating KroniK, George Hines and Johnny Smith, and The Varsity Club. One month later on August 30, Barton and Steele challenged Kronik for the World Tag Team Championship but were defeated. Following the loss, Barton and Steele left All Japan and signed with New Japan.

=== New Japan Pro-Wrestling (2002-2004) ===
Barton and Steele debuted for New Japan in late 2002. The team entered the 2002 Triathlon Series tournament teaming with Yuji Nagata in the fall of 2002 where the team became the runners-up losing to Osamu Nishimura, Manabu Nakanishi, and Yutaka Yoshie in the finals.

In February 2003 the team entered a tournament for the #1 contendership for the IWGP Tag Team Championship where they emerged victorious but the title shot would be delayed as Steele suffered an injury putting the team out of commission. The team returned in the fall of 2003 when they entered the 2003 G1 Tag League. During the league, Barton and Steele received their IWGP Tag Title shot against Hiroshi Tanahashi and Yutaka Yoshie but they lost. The team would finish the tournament in 6th place with 6 points. In December 2003, Barton and Steele had two tryout matches with the WWE but weren't hired. They returned to New Japan until leaving February 2004 and the team broke up from there.

=== Reunion (2005) ===
They reunited on February 5, 2005 as they teamed with George Hines when they defeated Chuck Palumbo, Jamal, and Rodney Mack at the Giant Baba 6th Anniversary Memorial in Tokyo, Japan.

== Championships and accomplishments ==
- All Japan Pro Wrestling
  - Stan Hansen Cup (2002)
  - January 2 Korakuen Hall Heavyweight Battle Royal (2001)- Barton
- New Japan Pro-Wrestling
  - IWGP Tag Team Championship #1 Contenders Tournament (2003)
- World Wrestling Council
  - WWC Puerto Rican Championship (1 Time)- Steele
