= Bart Gunn =

American professional wrestler and mixed martial artist (born 1965)

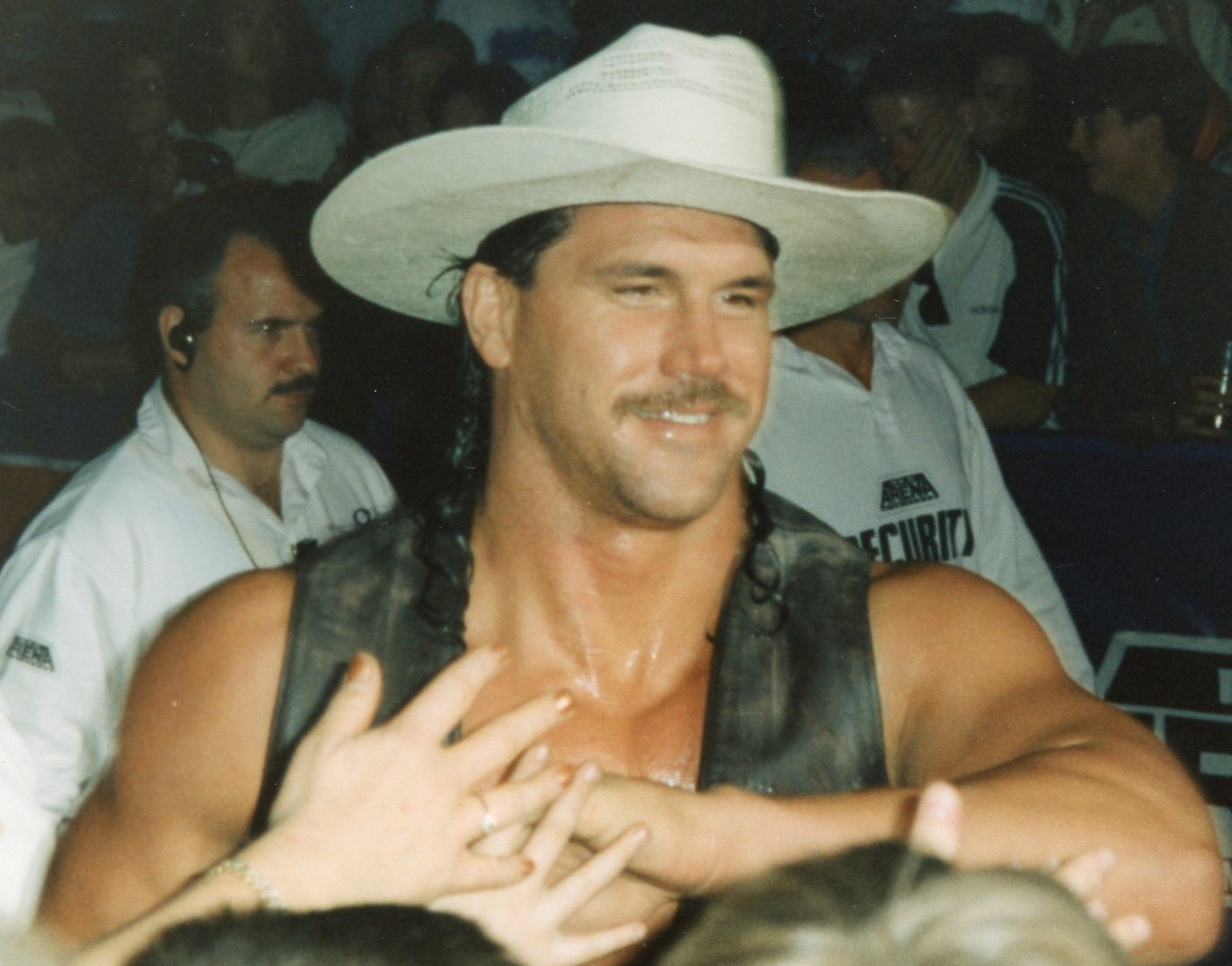
- Gunn in 1995

Personal information
- Born: Michael Polchlopek; December 27, 1965 (age 60) Titusville, Florida, U.S.

Professional wrestling career
- Ring name(s): Bart Gunn; Bodacious Bart; Brett Colt; Mike Barton
- Billed height: 6 ft 4 in (193 cm)
- Billed weight: 275 lb (125 kg)
- Billed from: Austin, Texas
- Trained by: Wrestling: Blackjack Mulligan; Boris Malenko; Caesar Barraza; Boxing: Ray Rinaldi
- Debut: 1991
- Retired: December 10, 2007

Michael Polchlopek (born December 27, 1965) is an American retired professional wrestler and mixed martial artist. He is best known for his appearances with the World Wrestling Federation (WWF) from 1993 to 1999 under the ring names Bart Gunn and Bodacious Bart. Under the ring name Bart Gunn, Polchlopek holds the distinction of being the only wrestler in WWE history to win a legitimate, unscripted competition, having emerged victorious in the 1998 shoot tournament Brawl for All.

He is also known for his appearances with All Japan Pro Wrestling (AJPW) from 1998 to 2002 and with New Japan Pro-Wrestling (NJPW) from 2002 to 2004 as Mike Barton.

== Early life ==
Michael Polchlopek was born on December 27, 1965, in Titusville, Florida. He was a big fan of wrestling, often watching Championship Wrestling from Florida, and enjoyed seeing Eddie and Mike Graham and Jack and Jerry Brisco.

== Professional wrestling career ==
=== Early career (1991–1993) ===
Polchlopek was trained to wrestle by Caesar Barraza, Blackjack Mulligan, Tim Parker and Boris Malenko. He made his debut in 1991.

In 1992, Polchlopek (wrestling as "Brett Colt") formed a tag team with Kip Winchester in the Tampa, Florida-based International Championship Wrestling Alliance known as the "Long Riders".

=== World Wrestling Federation (1993–1999) ===
==== Smoking Gunns (1993–1996) ====
Polchlopek was perhaps most famous in the World Wrestling Federation by teaming with Monty Sopp, with Polchlopek being named Barry Winchester while Sopp was named Kip Winchester. They made their debut on April 5, 1993, by defeating Barry Horowitz and Reno Riggins. Later on, they would be rebranded as The Smoking Gunns, with Sopp being named Billy and Polchlopek being named Bart. The team won the Tag Team Championship three times before breaking up and engaging in a brief feud in October 1996. Bart Gunn briefly went into solo competition, his most high-profile match occurring on Monday Night Raw, in April 1996, which he lost to "Ringmaster" Steve Austin via the Million Dollar Dream.

==== Singles competitor (1996–1997) ====
Gunn feuded with Billy Gunn during the fall of 1996 after Billy turned his back on Bart. The feud ended after he defeated Billy on the December 16 episode of Monday Night Raw. His most notable victory was scoring an upset victory over Triple H by disqualification on Superstars. He also participated in the 1997 Royal Rumble match being eliminated by Steve Austin. He would defeat Triple H by countout on February 17 on Raw after Goldust chased Triple H into the crowd. Gunn would later become a jobber in 1997 losing to the likes of Faarooq, Triple H, Ahmed Johnson and Vader. His final match in this run was on June 9, 1997, on an episode of Raw Is War against Rockabilly, where he was defeated. He disappeared from the roster afterward.

Gunn would then have a brief stint in Pennsylvania Championship Wrestling where he won their championship from Lance Diamond on May 3, 1997. Then he would drop the title to Ace Darling on September 26, 1997.

==== The Midnight Express (1998) ====
Under his new manager Jim Cornette, Polchlopek recreated the Midnight Express tag team as "Bodacious Bart" with partner Bombastic Bob in March 1998. The team had limited success, though they did hold the NWA World Tag Team Championship for a brief period from March to August 1998.

==== Brawl for All and departure (1998–1999) ====
In July 1998, Bart Gunn participated in the WWF's shootfight tournament, the Brawl for All. Gunn faced tag partner Bob Holly in the first round, and was declared the winner on points. Gunn next defeated "Dr. Death" Steve Williams, with a surprising knockout on August 24. Utilizing his enormous brute strength, Gunn defeated The Godfather in the semi-finals, and Bradshaw in the finals to win the tournament.

According to his interview in the Dark Side of the Ring episode on Brawl For All, he sat home for months following this after being told by Vince Russo that WWF creative had nothing for him at the time. Despite this, while still under WWF contract Gunn would sign with All Japan Pro Wrestling in October 1998, wrestling there for three months up until January 1999. During this time he also worked in the independent circuit.

After returning to WWF television in February 1999, the WWF sent him to be trained by Ray Rinaldi (notable for training Marc Mero) for a WrestleMania match against Eric "Butterbean" Esch. Gunn would then briefly feud with both Holly and Williams, both angry at having been beaten in the tournament, the latter masking himself and pushing Gunn off a stage to prevent him from winning the WWF Hardcore Championship from Holly. At WrestleMania XV, Esch brutally knocked out Gunn in 35 seconds. Polchlopek was soon after released by WWF.

=== All Japan Pro Wrestling (1998–2002) ===
==== World Tag Team Champion (1998–2000) ====
While still under contract with the WWF, Polchlopek found success wrestling in Japan (due in part to his knockout of Steve Williams, who in Japan was a longtime main-eventer and held a strong reputation for his toughness). After signing with All Japan Pro Wrestling in October 1998, his debut would be announced on the November 1, 1998, edition of AJPW TV. His first in-ring match and appearance with the company was at a pay-per-view on November 14, going by his WWF ring name Bart Gunn. He would compete in the 1998 World Strongest Tag Determination League, teaming with Johnny Ace, and finishing in 4th place with 8 points. He became a member of Johnny Ace's gaijin (foreign wrestlers) stable, The Movement, and the two continued to team.

Both would regularly wrestle until January 22, 1999, when Gunn returned to the WWF to fulfil the rest of his WWF contractual obligations.

Upon being released from the WWF after WrestleMania XV, he would return to AJPW in May 1999, still maintaining fanfare and momentum even after the loss to Butterbean. On June 9, Gunn and Ace defeated Kenta Kobashi and Jun Akiyama to win the World Tag Team Championship. They held the title for a month and a half, before losing to No Fear on July 23. Following the title loss, Polchlopek stopped using the Bart Gunn name and became known as Mike Barton. In late 1999, Barton and Ace took part in the 1999 World's Strongest Tag Determination League, finishing in 5th place with 9 points.

In the spring of 2000, Barton entered the Champion Carnival, defeating Masao Inoue in the first round but losing to Takao Omori in the second. On June 9, Barton and Ace took part in a tournament for the vacant World Tag Team Championship, and lost in the first round to the eventual tournament winners, The Holy Demon Army. In the summer of 2000, Mitsuharu Misawa left All Japan to form Pro Wrestling Noah, taking most of the native talent with him. Barton, like many of the gaijin, remained in All Japan. Johnny Ace, however, left All Japan during the split and retired from wrestling, taking an office job in WCW and later the WWF.

==== Revenge angle with Steve Williams (2000–2001) ====
In January 2000, "Dr. Death" Steve Williams returned to All Japan Pro Wrestling (AJPW), where Barton was wrestling as a full-time competitor during Williams's absence. On the January 17, 2000, edition of AJPW TV, Williams defeated Barton unexpectedly in a match, with the feud continuing for a week in the house show circuit before being postponed.

The storyline would resume in the summer of 2000 at a time when Barton was teaming with Giant Kimala and George Hines. Barton and Williams would each win against each other on various TV episodes and house shows in 50/50 booking. In the late summer and fall of 2000, Barton and Williams found themselves in an uneasy alliance where they both had a common enemy in Toshiaki Kawada, who was often defeating both Barton and Williams at the time on TV, as well as a common enemy with Genichiro Tenryu. Barton would ultimately defeat Kawada in tag-team action, but come short against Tenryu in the first round of the Triple Crown Tournament.

In December 2000, the storyline animosity between Barton and Williams resumed, where Williams crossed paths with Barton in a tag-team television match during the World's Strongest Tag Determination League 2000 tournament. They were on opposite teams and Williams sought to get even with Barton for his loss in the Brawl For All in a definitive match in the Tokyo Dome.

The feud with Williams would culminate into a revenge match on a January 28, 2001, pay-per-view main event, which Williams won. After this, Barton and Williams would regularly wrestle against each other throughout the first half of 2001, before the two would eventually team with each other later that year in October. Jim Steele and Mike Rotunda would join them in three-way or four-way tag team matches whenever the need arose.

By late 2001, Williams would be a friend of Bart Gunn, often being by his side and taking part in both backstage and in-ring skits, as well as Williams rooting for Barton in his matches. Most notably, in January 2002 the pair celebrated Abdullah The Butcher's birthday together in the ring singing and telling jokes, as well as Williams cheering Barton on when he was facing Genichiro Tenryu in the Champion Carnival 2002 tournament. Barton ultimately defeated Tenryu, bragging backstage to the camera about his win, where Williams was happy for Barton and they fist pumped each other shouting in excitement.

==== Teaming with Jim Steele (2000–2002) ====
Following the NOAH exodus, Barton formed a new tag team with Jim Steele. In October 2000, Barton entered a tournament for the vacant Triple Crown Heavyweight Championship, losing in the first round to Genichiro Tenryu. In November, Barton and Steele entered the 2000 World's Strongest Tag Determination League, finishing in 4th place with 10 points.

On January 2, 2001, Barton won the annual January 2 Korakuen Hall Battle Royal. In the spring, Barton entered the 2001 Champion Carnival, placing 5th with 13 points. By the end of 2001, Barton had begun making appearances in New Japan Pro-Wrestling as a member of the All Japan branch of Team 2000. In November 2001, Barton and Steele entered the 2001 G1 Tag League and made it to the finals, where they lost to Tencozy.

In the spring of 2002, Barton entered the 2002 Champion Carnival, making it to the finals but losing to Keiji Mutoh. On July 20, Barton and Steele won The Stan Hansen Cup Four Way against The Varsity Club, KroniK, and George Hines & Johnny Smith. On August 30, Barton and Steele challenged Kronik for the World Tag Team Championship, but lost. In the fall, Barton and Steele left All Japan. Their last match in AJPW was on October 27, 2002, where they teamed with George Hines to defeat Arashi, Nobukazu Hirai & Nobutaka Araya.

=== Total Nonstop Action Wrestling (2003) ===
Polchlopek had a short stint in Total Nonstop Action Wrestling in 2003 only lasting a month where he wrestled one match where he lost to Perry Saturn.

=== New Japan Pro-Wrestling (2002–2004) ===
After leaving All Japan, Barton and Steele signed with New Japan Pro-Wrestling (NJPW). Barton entered the 2002 New Japan Triathlon Series in November, teaming with Steele and Yuji Nagata. The team made it to the finals, but lost to Manabu Nakanishi, Osamu Nishimura and Yutaka Yoshie. In February 2003, Barton and Steele entered a #1 Contenders tournament for the IWGP Tag Team Championship. They ultimately emerged victorious, defeating Makai Club members Tadao Yasuda and Kazunari Murakami in the finals, but an injury to Steele prevented them from getting the title match. After Steele recovered, he and Barton returned to teaming. In October 2003, they entered the 2003 G1 Tag League. During the tournament, on October 21, the two received a shot at the IWGP Tag Team Title against champions Hiroshi Tanahashi and Yutaka Yoshie, but came up short. Barton and Steele finished the tournament in 5th place with 6 points. Gunn left New Japan in April 2004.

=== Reunion with Jim Steele (2005) ===
Gunn reunited with Jim Steele as they teamed with George Hines when they defeated Chuck Palumbo, Jamal, and Rodney Mack at the Giant Baba 6th Anniversary Memorial on February 5, 2006, in Tokyo, Japan.

=== Muga World Pro Wrestling (2006) ===
On September 15, 2006, Barton had his debut match in Muga World Pro Wrestling, which was a victory over Tatsutoshi Goto, then had another 4 matches in the company. His last match in the company was a victory over Katsushi Takemura on September 25, 2006. Afterwards, Barton left the company.

=== Return to World Wrestling Entertainment (2003, 2007) ===
Wrestling as Mike Barton, he and Jim Steele would wrestle two tryout matches for World Wrestling Entertainment in December 2003, which were dark matches that never aired on television. They won both matches, although ultimately neither ended up signing with the WWE.

Polchlopek returned to the WWE as Bart Gunn for the December 10, 2007, edition of Raw, where he participated in the 15th Anniversary Battle Royal. He was eliminated from the match by Steve Blackman. Afterwards, he retired from professional wrestling.

== Mixed martial arts career ==
Polchlopek made his mixed martial arts debut against UFC veteran Wesley Correira at Rumble On The Rock: Beatdown on June 17, 2006. He won his debut via TKO after the ringside doctor determined Correira was unable to continue fighting after suffering a large cut.

In his second and final fight, on November 5, 2006, he faced Ikuhisa Minowa at PRIDE Bushido 13, losing via unanimous decision.

=== Mixed martial arts record ===
Professional record breakdown
2 matches	1 win	1 loss
By knockout	1	0
By decision	0	1

Res.	Record	Opponent	Method	Event	Date	Round	Time	Location	Notes
Loss	1–1	Ikuhisa Minowa	Decision (unanimous)	Pride – Bushido 13	November 5, 2006	2	5:00	Yokohama, Kanagawa, Japan	
Win	1–0	Wesley Correira	TKO (cut)	ROTR – Beatdown 1	June 17, 2006	1	1:46	Hawaii, United States	

== Personal life ==
Polchlopek was previously an electrician until 1993, and resumed work as an electrician 15 years later, in addition to doing home construction work. He is a father. He currently resides in Orange Beach, Alabama.

== Championships and accomplishments ==
- All Japan Pro Wrestling
  - World Tag Team Championship (1 time) – with Johnny Ace
  - Stan Hansen Cup (2002) – with Jim Steele
  - January 2 Korakuen Hall Heavyweight Battle Royal (2001)
- International Wrestling Federation
  - IWF World Tag Team Championship (2 times) – with Kip Winchester
- New Japan Pro-Wrestling
  - IWGP Tag Team Championship #1 Contenders Tournament (2003) – with Jim Steele
- Pennsylvania Championship Wrestling
  - PCW Americas Championship (2 times)
- Pro Wrestling Illustrated
  - Ranked No. 129 of the top 500 singles wrestlers of the PWI 500 in 1997
  - Ranked No. 377 of the top 500 singles wrestlers of the PWI Years in 2003
- World Wrestling Federation
  - WWF Tag Team Championship (3 times) – with Billy Gunn
  - NWA World Tag Team Championship (1 time) – with Bombastic Bob
  - Brawl for All (1998)
  - Raw Bowl (1996) – with Billy Gunn
