= Steve Williams (wrestler) =

American professional and amateur wrestler, football player and author (1960–2009)

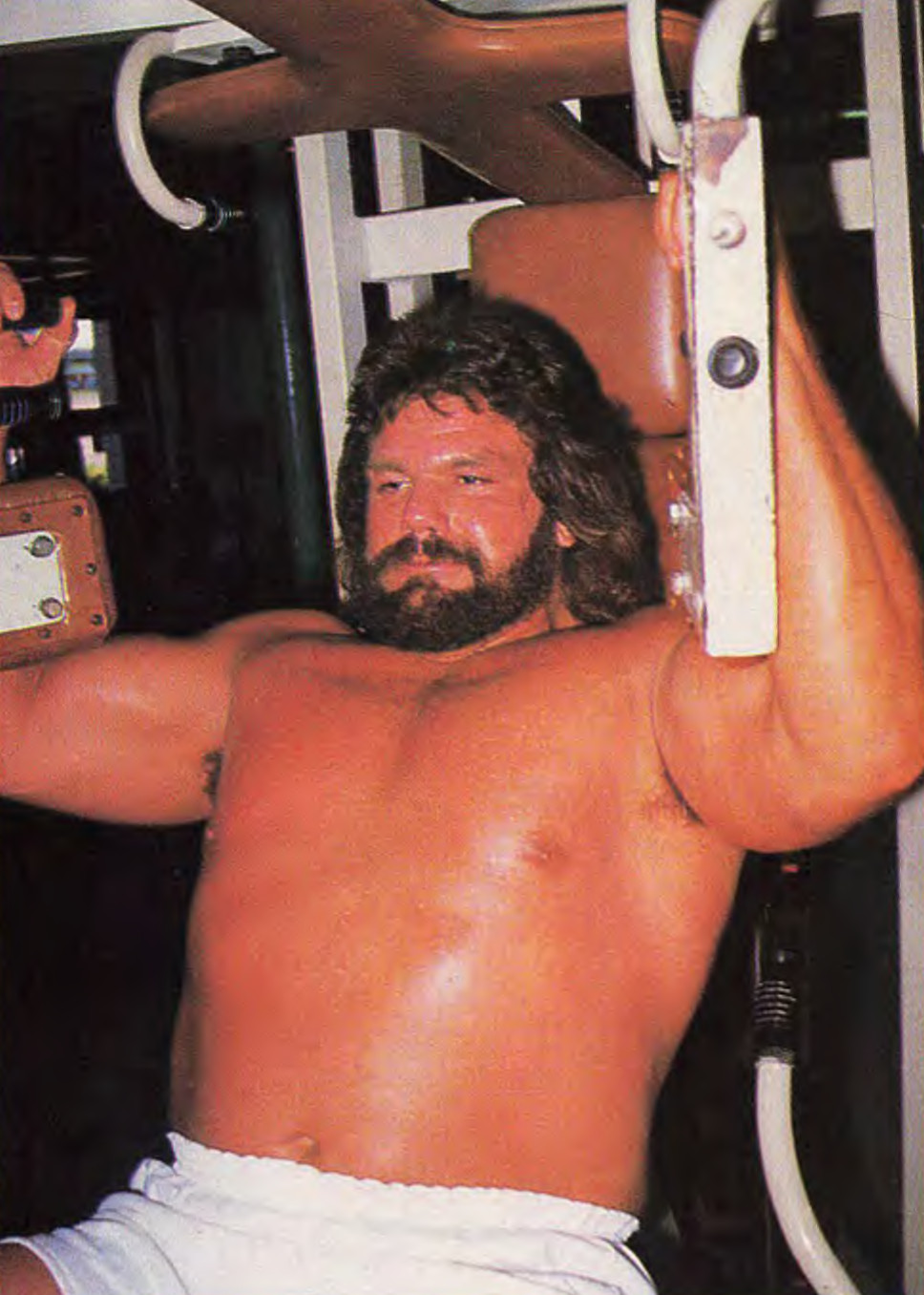
- Williams c. 1988

Personal information
- Born: Steven Franklin Williams; May 14, 1960 Lakewood, Colorado, U.S.
- Died: December 29, 2009 (aged 49) Denver, Colorado, U.S.
- Cause of death: Throat cancer
- Education: University of Oklahoma

Professional wrestling career
- Ring name(s): Steve Williams; Dr. Death
- Billed height: 6 ft 1 in (1.85 m)
- Billed weight: 285 lb (129 kg)
- Billed from: Lakewood, Colorado; Norman, Oklahoma; Nagoya, Japan; Shreveport, Louisiana
- Trained by: Bill Watts; Buddy Landel
- Debut: 1982
- Retired: 2009
- Sports career
Medal record
Collegiate Wrestling
Representing the Oklahoma Sooners
NCAA Division I Championships
Bronze medal – third place	1981 Princeton	Heavyweight
Silver medal – second place	1982 Ames	Heavyweight

Steven Franklin Williams (May 14, 1960 – December 29, 2009), best known under the ring name "Dr. Death" Steve Williams, was an American collegiate and professional wrestler and collegiate football player. He was known for his tenures in World Championship Wrestling (WCW) and All Japan Pro Wrestling (AJPW), and is a three-time professional wrestling world heavyweight champion, having won both the Herb Abrams and Bill Watts versions of the UWF World Heavyweight Championship and the AJPW Triple Crown Heavyweight Championship.

In addition to his success as a singles professional wrestler, Williams achieved notoriety in Japan in tag team competition, winning the World Tag Team Championship eight times with notable gaijin tag team partners Terry Gordy, Gary Albright and Vader. His tag team success continued in North America, winning tag team titles in the Mid-South (UWF), WCW, and the NWA as well as winning the World's Strongest Tag Determination League twice with Gordy and Mike Rotunda.

In 2004, Williams was diagnosed with throat cancer, and underwent successful surgery the following year. He continued to wrestle on the independent circuit until his cancer returned in 2009, dying that year at the age of 49. Williams was posthumously inducted into the WWE Hall of Fame in 2021 as part of the Legacy Wing.

== Early life ==
Steven Franklin Williams was born and raised in the Denver suburb of Lakewood, Colorado on May 14, 1960. He was the youngest of four children born to Gerald (died 1985) and Dottie Williams (died 2016). He grew up in Lakewood, where he also was living with his mother at the time of his death. Williams attended Lakewood High School, graduating in 1978. He was on the track & field team, played football, and wrestled all four years.

Williams graduated from the University of Oklahoma in 1981 where he played football and also competed as an amateur wrestler, where he was a four time All American, finishing 6th as a freshman, 5th as a sophomore, 3rd as a junior and 2nd as a senior. He lost in the finals of an NCAA tournament his senior year to future 2x Olympic gold medalist Bruce Baumgartner. Already interested in professional wrestling, Williams had a ready-made nickname that dated back to an incident in junior high wherein he had to wrestle in a hockey goalie's mask due to shattering his nose and was jokingly labeled "Dr. Death" by one of his school's coaches and his sister.

== Football career ==
=== College ===
Williams started every game in 1982 for the Oklahoma Sooners at right guard. He was named to the UPI All-Big Eight first team and played in the 1983 Fiesta Bowl. He was also a member of the Sooners 1980 Orange Bowl and 1981 Sun Bowl squads. Williams played both guard positions while at OU.

=== Professional ===
Williams was selected by the New Jersey Generals in the 1983 USFL Territorial Draft on January 3, 1983. He signed with the Generals on January 31, just prior to the opening of training camp. Williams was converted to a defensive tackle in training camp. During camp, Williams suffered a bruised knee and was placed on injured reserve for the first six games of the Generals 1983 season.

After being activated for week #10 vs. the Birmingham Stallions on May 9, Williams was the starting nose tackle for the Generals in a 22–7 loss at Giants Stadium in the Meadowlands. The game was telecast live on ESPN. Williams started at nose tackle the following week on May 16, in a 31–24 loss to the Michigan Panthers at the Silverdome in Pontiac, MI – a game also shown on ESPN.

== Professional wrestling career ==
=== Mid-South Wrestling / Universal Wrestling Federation (1982–1987) ===
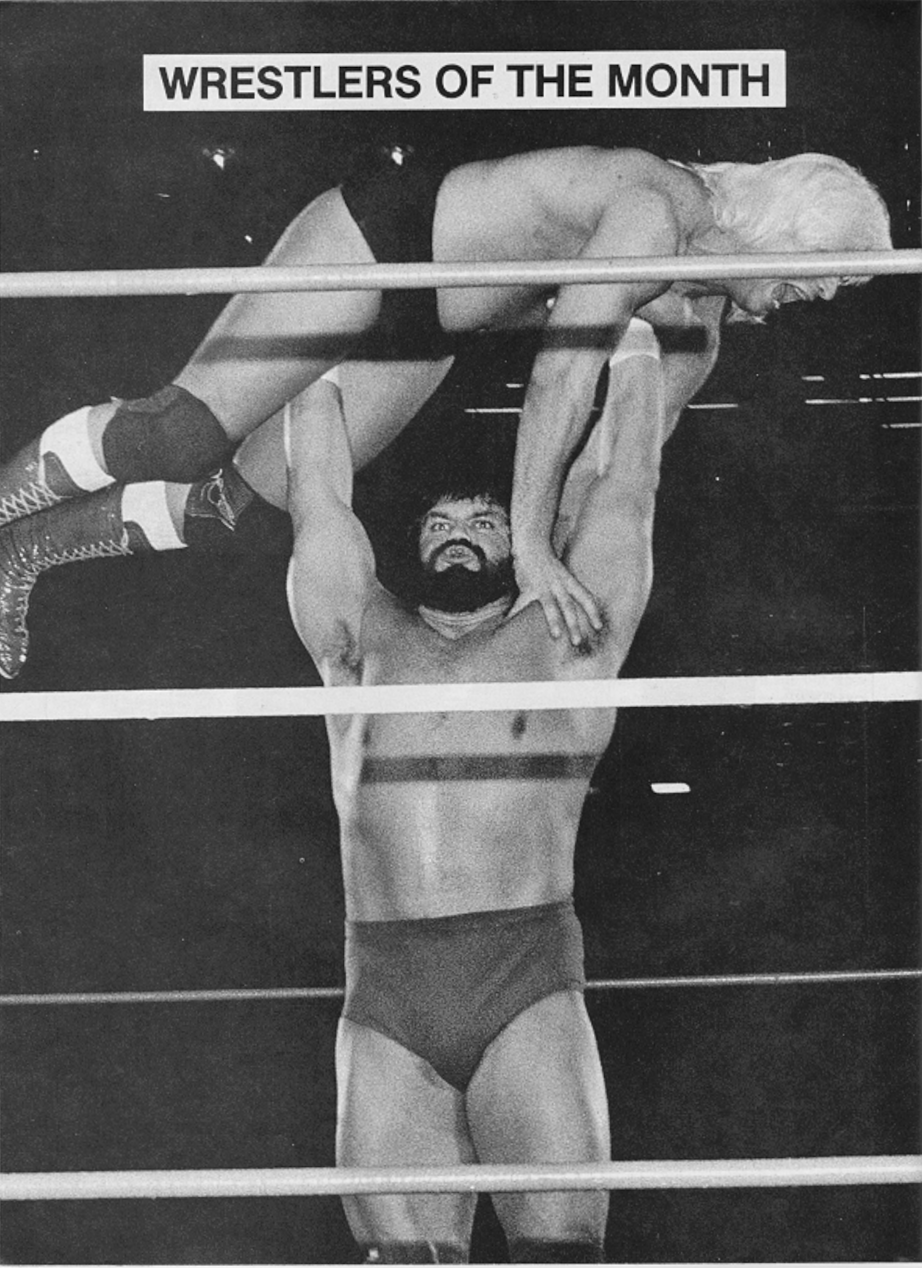
Williams (bottom) gorilla presses Buddy Landel (top), circa 1986

Williams trained as a professional wrestler under Bill Watts and Buddy Landel, started wrestling in 1982 in Watts' Mid-South Wrestling. In 1985, he formed a team with Ted DiBiase and feuded with Eddie Gilbert and The Nightmare. In 1986, Mid-South was renamed the Universal Wrestling Federation and Williams went on to win the UWF Heavyweight Championship from Big Bubba Rogers.

=== New Japan Pro-Wrestling (1986–1990) ===
From 1986 to 1990, Williams performed for New Japan Pro-Wrestling (NJPW).

=== Jim Crockett Promotions / World Championship Wrestling (1987–1990) ===
In April 1987, Jim Crockett Promotions (JCP) bought the UWF in late 1987. Williams began wrestling regularly for JCP in July 1987. Williams became involved in Jimmy Garvin's war with Kevin Sullivan's Varsity Club in 1988, often teaming with Jimmy and Ron Garvin or Ron Simmons in various matches, including a triple cage "Tower of Doom" match at The Great American Bash in 1988.

Williams turned heel and joined the Varsity Club in late 1988. He and Sullivan won the NWA United States Tag Team Championship at Starrcade '88: True Gritt. They feuded with the Road Warriors, and he and Mike Rotunda won the NWA World Tag Team Championship in the process. In May 1989, Williams and Rotunda were stripped of the title, and the Varsity Club disbanded.

Not long after, Williams turned face again and had a short feud with Rotunda over who was responsible for the Varsity Club's breakup, before entering a feud with Lex Luger for the NWA United States Championship. Williams was scheduled to face Luger for the title at WrestleWar '90: Wild Thing on February 25, 1990. When Sting, who was scheduled to face Ric Flair for the NWA World Heavyweight Championship, suffered a legitimate knee injury, Luger turned face and was moved from the United States Heavyweight Championship title match to the World Heavyweight Championship match in Sting's place. He then departed the company.

=== All Japan Pro Wrestling (1990–1998) ===
Following a one-time appearance for New Japan Pro Wrestling on February 10, 1990, at their Super Fight In Tokyo Dome card where he defeated Salman Hashimikov, Williams went to All Japan Pro Wrestling in February 1990, Williams began to work for All Japan Pro Wrestling with Terry Gordy, initially as part of The Miracle Violence Connection team, while still wrestling for New Japan at the same time. They established themselves on the card and had matches against the likes of Giant Baba, Stan Hansen, Jumbo Tsuruta, Genichiro Tenryu and André The Giant. They won the world tag team titles together on March 6 by beating Hansen and Genichiro Tenryu. During that year, Williams was dividing his time between All Japan and New Japan, meaning he was holding the AJPW tag belt on the New Japan rings, something rare for the time. After a few more matches for New Japan, Williams firmed with All Japan in January 1991 and became exclusively loyal to them.

Williams became the last wrestler to defeat André The Giant, which took place June 5, 1992. André in the early 90s was ill with acromegaly, and during one of Williams's Tag Team Championship victories with Terry Gordy, André shook Williams's hand as a way to pass the torch. Both of them prior had been close friends prior in Mid-South Wrestling. After André's death in February 1993, Williams began winning many matches against AJPW native main-eventers in singles such as defeating Akira Taue (April 1993), Kenta Kobashi (September 1993) and Jun Akiyama (April 1994). Williams would go on to defeat Kobashi twice again in 1994.

Over time Williams gradually got traction and fanfare from the Japanese audience. Baba booked him to be a main eventer for the company. After, Williams became one of the most successful foreign athletes in Japanese wrestling history, especially in reference to the 90s and early 2000s. On July 28, 1994, he defeated top AJPW star Mitsuharu Misawa for the AJPW Triple Crown Championship, holding it for three months before dropping it to Toshiaki Kawada. Williams became a mainstay gaijin on AJPW television along with Stan Hansen, Terry Gordy, Johnny Ace and Gary Albright. He would either team with them or fight them in singles from 1994 to 1998 in a variety of feuds during a wrestling boom in Japan, comparable to that of WWF's Attitude Era in terms of domestic scope in Japan itself.

On August 31, 1997, Williams won the World Tag Team Championship titles with Gary Albright. Williams' last TV appearance for his first All Japan run was on the June 28, 1998 edition of AJPW TV. He and Wolf Hawkfield defeated Masao Inoue and Takao Omori before Williams went to the WWF, giving a symbolic farewell to Giant Baba and the Japanese audience after the match.

=== Universal Wrestling Federation (1990–1991, 1994) ===
Williams made his debut for Herb Abrams's Universal Wrestling Federation in September 1990. Williams defeated Bam Bam Bigelow in the tournament finals for the UWF SportsChannel Television Championship at Beach Brawl. After winning, Williams went to Japan and vacated the title.

Williams returned for a one-night appearance in 1994 at UWF Blackjack Brawl where he was award the UWF World Heavyweight Championship and defeated Sid Vicious by disqualification.

=== World Championship Wrestling (1992) ===
On February 29, 1992, at SuperBrawl II, then WCW Executive Vice President Kip Frey announced that he was negotiating to bring Williams and Terry Gordy back to World Championship Wrestling. On March 9, the duo defeated three enhancement teams at a television taping for The Main Event in Anderson, South Carolina in contests that would not air until May. On the April 18 edition of WCW Saturday Night, it was announced that Williams and Gordy would be part of the upcoming tournament for the vacant NWA World Tag Team Championship that summer.

At Clash of the Champions XIX on June 16, the duo defeated the Australian representatives Larry O'Day and Jeff O'Day in the opening round of the NWA Tournament. As a bonus for the Clash, it was announced by new WCW Executive Vice President Bill Watts that the quarter-finals would begin later that night; as a result in a non-title match Williams and Gordy defeated WCW World Tag Team Champions the Steiner Brothers. While waiting for the next round to begin following the Clash, the duo would face and defeat Marcus Bagwell and Tom Zenk in house show matches. At Beach Blast, Williams and Gordy again faced the Steiner Brothers, this time going to a thirty-minute draw. On July 5, 1992, at a house show at the Omni in Atlanta, Georgia, Williams and Gordy won the WCW World Tag Team Championship from the Steiner Brothers Shortly afterwards at The Great American Bash, the final two rounds of the NWA Tag-Team Championship Tournament were run. Gordy and Williams defeated Ricky Steamboat and Nikita Koloff in the semi-finals, and then beat Dustin Rhodes and Barry Windham in the tournament final. Their NWA title win, however, went unrecognized by the NWA.

Steve Williams and Terry Gordy then began feuding with the Dangerous Alliance, defeating Bobby Eaton and Arn Anderson in house show matches. On the September 26 edition of The Main Event, the duo sustained their first televised defeat when they were beaten by the Steiner Brothers in a non-title matchup. On the October 3 edition of WCW Saturday Night, they were then upset by Dustin Rhodes and Barry Windham and lost both titles. Williams and Gordy received a rematch at Halloween Havoc 92 but Gordy quit the company and was replaced by Steve Austin and they were only able to wrestle Rhodes and Windham to a time limit draw. On December 12, Williams teamed with Big Van Vader in an unsuccessful challenge to Windham and Rhodes in Columbus, Ohio. On December 28, he participated in the Battle Bowl event at Starrcade '92: Battlebowl – The Lethal Lottery II and teamed with Sting to defeat Eric Watts and Jushin Liger. At the start of the event it was announced that he would be substituting for an injured Rick Rude to challenge Ron Simmons for the WCW World Heavyweight Championship, but lost by disqualification. He left WCW shortly thereafter.

=== Extreme Championship Wrestling (1996–1997) ===
Williams sporadically wrestled in the U.S. on the independent circuit. That run was brought to an end during one of his appearances in Extreme Championship Wrestling (ECW). After defeating Axl Rotten in approximately 2 minutes, Williams had an impromptu ECW World Heavyweight Championship match, but lost after being pinned by then-champion Raven. The loss happened in February 1997 at Crossing the Line Again.

=== World Wrestling Federation (1998–1999) ===
In May 1998, Williams was signed by the World Wrestling Federation (WWF) prior to the "Brawl for All" competition, which was set up in legitimate fights. WWF took interest in signing him due to his success in All Japan. Before entering the Brawl for All and signing a contract, he had only one in-ring match with the WWF, which was against 2 Cold Scorpio on a WWF Shotgun taping dark match (April 28, 1998). According to house show cards and recaps, Vince McMahon introduced him to the ring for this dark match.

On the July 20 edition of Raw is War, Williams entered the Brawl for All tournament, making his first WWF television appearance with many expecting him to win. However, after beating Pierre Carl Ouellet in the first round, he faced Bart Gunn in the second round. Gunn took Williams down, tearing his quad, then knocked Williams out. Williams missed several months following the injury. Upon healing in January 1999, Williams worked dark matches on Heat/Shotgun/Raw is War tapings, mainly against Bob Holly (then still a part of the J.O.B. Squad) to open up the tapings. His first match after rehabilitating his quad was defeating Holly on January 12, 1999, in Beaumont, TX.

Williams was involved in a brief angle where he was managed by Jim Ross in early 1999 before Williams was released. During his time with Ross, he would attack people with suplexes, debuting on the February 22, 1999 edition of Raw is War. He wore a kabuki mask and threw Bart Gunn off a stage during a match of his. On the March 1 episode of Raw, Jim Ross announced that Bart Gunn would fight Butterbean at WrestleMania XV, and Gunn and Ross argued over the Brawl For All in a worked shoot. During the segment, Williams attacked Gunn with the backdrop driver, revealing himself to be the masked man. This story was played-off on WWF television as Williams getting revenge against Gunn for his Brawl for All loss.

After, Williams was involved in two storylines as a babyface, one where he was pursuing the WWF Hardcore Championship from Hardcore Holly, and another where he sought to get even with Tiger Ali Singh for making fun of Ross on live television. On the March 15, 1999 edition of Sunday Night Heat, Tiger Ali Singh paid a fan (Ed Ferrara) to impersonate Jim Ross, who had a bout with Bell's palsy at the time. Out of anger, Williams attacked Ferrara with a backdrop driver and Singh with his signature "Dr. Bomb" slam, and Ross would proceed to conduct a promo before Vince McMahon sent Big Show out to clear the ring. Williams would stare at Big Show, but would later leave the ring with Ross. On the March 21, 1999 edition of Sunday Night Heat, Williams defeated The Hardy Boys in a handicap match. He next appeared on the March 22 edition of Raw is War, where he and WWF Hardcore Champion, Hardcore Holly, brawled in a fraternity house in Albany, New York. At WresleMania XV on the HSN version of WWF Free For All, Williams cut a backstage promo on Bart Gunn, saying how "Bart deserved what he got" after Bart lost to Butterbean. The day after on March 29 Raw episode, Williams and Hardcore Holly fought in a hardcore match, which Williams lost because Al Snow interfered. On the April 5 Raw episode, Williams attacked both Snow and Holly with suplexes in the ring. Later in the week on the April 10 episode of WWF Shotgun, Williams defeated Tiger Ali Singh in what would be his final match for the company.

While injured with a bad hamstring Williams decided to wrestle at the Giant Baba Memorial Show on May 2, 1999. Despite wrestling injured he didn't want to miss out at this event due to not wanting to let his mentor Giant Baba down, who died at the beginning of the year.

In Williams' autobiography, as well as in his RF Video shoot interview in 2001, these midcard storylines were meant as a way to build his character up on television before entering a main event feud with Stone Cold Steve Austin, which in Williams's contract was promised to be a 6-month feud. Williams was released in mid-April for needing further time to rehab his injury and for refusing to work for FMW, a Japanese promotion with which the WWF had talent exchanges. He was scheduled to compete against Snow and Holly at Backlash: In Your House for the WWF Hardcore Championship, but he did not appear due to his release.

According to a radio interview from November 1999, Williams stated that he was originally planned to have some of Triple H's storylines before his release. He would use the segment on the October 4, 1999 episode of Raw is War when Triple H attacked Jim Ross as an example, saying that this was the storyline where he was going to start his feud with Austin. Williams said that, because the angle was originally planned for him, it was intended to be the storyline through which he would turn heel, as Ross was going to manage him as a babyface until that point later in the year. Williams stated in his book that his main event push was going to start after the debut of WWF Smackdown! on UPN.

=== Return to WCW (1999) ===
In November 1999, Williams healed from his hamstring injury and appeared briefly in World Championship Wrestling (WCW) again, with Oklahoma (who in an ironic twist happened to be Ed Ferrara) as his manager in a feud with Vampiro. As a result of this feud, he wrestled against Jerry Only from the Misfits on the November 29 edition of WCW Monday Nitro in a steel cage match. On December 2 on Thunder in Topeka, KS, Williams rebounded to defeat Silver King, Villano IV and Villano V in a three on one match. On the following Nitro in Milwaukee, WI, Williams teamed with Oklahoma to defeat Vampiro and Jerry Only. On December 13, 1999, he then faced Sid Vicious in New Orleans, LA, but was pinned. At Starrcade 99 on December 19, Williams faced Vampiro in a one-on-one encounter and was defeated via disqualification after he shoved referee Charles Robinson.

Very shortly after, the announcement that he would return to All Japan Pro Wrestling (AJPW) was on December 26, 1999.

=== Return to AJPW (2000–2003) ===
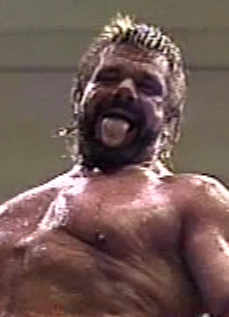
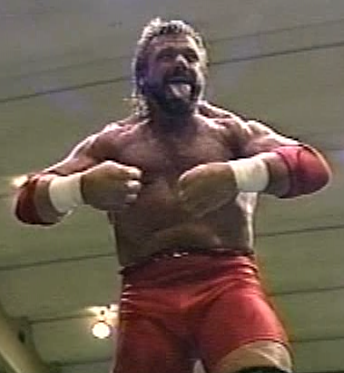
Steve Williams at an AJPW live event in January 2003 after defeating Satoshi Kojima in tag-team action.

Williams went back to AJPW and had a second full-time run from 2000 to 2003. In the early 2000s, Williams was a babyface with an antihero edge, portraying an AJPW loyalist keeping the legacy of the Baba family name alive, as well as a comeback story upon his injury in the Brawl For All. Williams made his return on January 2, 2000, winning the New Year's Battle Royal on AJPW TV. Upon his return, the original plan was for Williams to reform the Triangle of Power with Gary Albright, but was scrapped after Albright's death on January 7. In the following weeks, Williams defeated Mike Barton to start up a revenge angle and teased a program with Big Van Vader. In a match they kept slapping each other acting as if they were setting up a future angle, but both of them swerved the audience and excitedly high-fived to reveal themselves as tag-team partners. Together they held a tag-team title reign when they captured the World Tag Team Championship titles from Kenta Kobashi and Jun Akiyama in February 2000. They split in early April when Vader left the company.

Williams then feuded with success in singles against Akira Taue in the spring, Jinsei Shinzaki in the summer, Scott Norton in the fall at NJPW Do Judge!!, and Mike Barton again at the beginning of 2001 in a revenge match.

In the summer of 2000, Williams had an unsuccessful feud against Toshiaki Kawada throughout AJPW TV episodes, which Williams lost, the angle being that Williams sought to get even with Kawada for defeating him for the Triple Crown Championship in 1994. A particular notable match was on an October 14, 2000 Korakuen Hall show, where Williams chose to wrestle in a girdle with broken ribs and a punctured lung, knocking out Kawada by a stiff punch, but coming short against a stiff Kawada kick to the head. Speaking about the match on his website, Williams wrote, "I didn't miss a shot, just taped myself up and went out there. It's in my blood. I can’t help it, man. I love this business." Williams would also say prior to the match how he was doing it to keep AJPW afloat at the time in the midst of the NOAH exodus and being a team player.

On the December 9, 2000 pay-per-view Steve Williams and Mike Rotunda won the World's Strongest Tag Determination League in the main event and honored Giant Baba after the match. Williams pinned Fuchi for the victory while Rotunda successfully kept Kawada down.

Williams had a main event pay-per-view match against Keiji Muto on July 14, 2001, for the Triple Crown Heavyweight Championship, which Williams lost when the referee called a two-count as a three-count. After leaving the backstage area Williams would then going on a huge swearing tirade, where he kicked a trash can, was about to cry in tears, and then throwing his armpads to the ground while swearing again. Such scenes never happened in the traditional All Japan, and this would be an early sign of what would become the Pro Wrestling Love era, ultimately leading Williams into a grudge feud with Muto into 2002.

In late 2001, 2002 and early 2003 Williams often teamed with Mike Rotundo and Mike Barton. The latter he befriended on TV and took part in multiple in-ring and backstage skits with, such as singing together in the ring for Abdulla The Butcher's birthday and Williams supporting Barton's effort in fighting Genichiro Tenryu and Keiji Muto. However, Williams would turn on Barton on the April 15, 2002 pay-per-view, before befriending him again in October 2002.

Williams would have sporadic singles feuds against Keiji Muto (defeating him in a singles match once out of revenge in March 2002), Taiyo Kea and George Hines, since Williams dealt with ongoing leg injuries and was used less frequently in singles competition than earlier in his career. Staying in the tag division was safer for Williams' longevity in AJPW's upper-midcard and main events, as well as the popularity of tag-teams in Japanese wrestling at this time. Williams last main event in the Budokan would be on the August 31, 2002 Summer Action Series pay per view, where Williams and Muto would each lead their own 5-man teams in a 10-man elimination match. The match ended with Williams scoring a clean pinfall victory against Muto, thus ending the angle.

In the tag division, Williams notably feuded with Satoshi Kojima, where Williams took the role of the veteran AJPW loyalist and Kojima as the young NJPW invader, who served as the sidekick to Keiji Muto. Williams surprise attacked and suplexed Kojima on TV when Kojima was cutting an in-ring promo, and Williams would often mention Kojima in his backstage promos as someone he would like to defeat. In November 2002, Williams and Mike Rotunda faced Kojima and Taiyo Kea in a hardcore tag-team match at the Korakuen Hall in a losing effort. After a series of three house show matches involving Rotunda at Williams's side, where they defeated Kojima and his team each time, the Williams vs. Kojima feud ended abruptly in January 2003 when AJPW's sale finalized and Williams left the company, with no singles match payoff.

William's last appearance during his second All Japan run was on the January 13, 2003 pay-per-view of AJPW. On this show, Williams, Mike Rotunda, and Shigeo Okumura defeated George Hines, Hideki Hosaka and Johnny Smith.

=== Christian Wrestling Federation (2002–2003) ===
During his vacations from AJPW, Williams would still work in independent promotions in the United States, most notably the Christian Wrestling Federation (CWF). He became the CWF Heavyweight Champion sometime in the first half of 2002, later holding a successful title defense against Apocalypse in August 2002 at the Six Flags Darien Lake Resort. During the match, Apocalypse worked as a heel and had two wrestlers interfere in the match in his favor, but Williams was able to fight both of them back using Japanese style moves. After, Williams defeated Apocalypse by way of pinfall after using the Dr. Bomb powerbomb. Post match, he cut an AJPW-like promo, saying, "I might be the champion today! The CWF champion, me! But the real man is the champion!", pointing at the sky and the crowd cheering in response.

Upon leaving AJPW in January 2003, Williams began to work more shows for the CWF while hoping for potential work with NJPW, NOAH or WWE as a trainer. Ultimately, Williams was hired IWA Japan later that year.

In his autobiography, Williams spoke positively about his time in the CWF, saying that since his "focus is to win souls for Jesus Christ, I really enjoyed working here and for other Christian organizations". Williams then spoke about his match in 2002, saying "I remember one stint where Wyndham [his son, then 10 years old] and I spent four days in Buffalo, New York, at a Christian convention. The event was located inside the Six Flags theme park. Not only did I wrestle, but Wyndham and I had a great time riding all the rides".

=== Later career (2003–2009) ===
Williams wrestled a couple of matches for WWE on May 23 and 24, 2003 against Lance Storm. In late 2003, he was involved with the independent promotion Major League Wrestling (MLW) and also wrestled for IWA Japan and the new NWA Mid-Atlantic, where he won their title in one of the first professional wrestling events in China. On March 14, 2004, Williams faced Belarusian kickboxer Alexey Ignashov in a mixed martial arts bout in the K-1 promotion and was knocked out 22 seconds into the fight. According to Williams he was tested positive with throat cancer a couple days before the match. This was his first and only professional fight.

In March 2004, Williams underwent surgery for throat cancer, the tumor developing and remaining undetected since September 2003. Williams made a surprise appearance on the July 22, 2004 AJPW pay-per-view while he was undergoing surgery. He and Genichiro Tenryu defeated Arashi and Nobukazu Hirai on the show. Williams also cut a promo in a very hoarse and sickly voice, saying that he still wanted to wrestle Kawada again and return to AJPW when Williams became healthy. This would be Williams's last appearance in the Pro Wrestling Love era as well as in AJPW.

Williams was declared cancer-free in March 2005, making the announcement on the March 27, 2005 edition of IWA Japan TV. This was also the show where he publicly unveiled his electrolarynx. His return match was against King Kaluha, who he defeated on August 27, 2005, at WrestleReunion 2. According to promoter Sal Corrente, Williams was initially hesitant to work with King Kaluha but was ultimately appreciative about the choice of opponent.

Williams made an appearance at a SmackDown! brand house show on March 11, 2006, in Alexandria, Louisiana, after which he was signed to help train up-and-coming WWE wrestlers in its Ohio Valley Wrestling (OVW) developmental territory. While acting in that capacity, he made a few appearances on OVW television, where he helped fellow Oklahoma wrestler Jake Hager and briefly working as his tag team partner. He also made an appearance at an August 30 Raw house show, during which he addressed the crowd and announced how happy he was to be cancer free for four years.

Williams left OVW abruptly and had his last appearance on June 29, 2007, just days after the Chris Benoit tragedy and its subsequent media coverage. No public reason was given.

Later, he made appearances for Oklahoma-based independent federation Sooner World Class Wrestling (SWCW). He also worked for Southwest Airlines in Colorado.

After the death of longtime rival and friend Mitsuharu Misawa in June 2009, Williams made the decision to retire from wrestling after 27 years. Williams's final match took place August 15 in Colorado Springs, Colorado, for Asylum Championship Wrestling. He defeated Franco D'Angelo for the ACW Heavyweight Championship, which he vacated after the match.

== Death ==
The throat cancer eventually returned and Williams's health gradually worsened. His last public appearance was at the K&S Wrestlefest Wrestling Convention on December 12, 2009, in Carteret, New Jersey. On December 29, 2009, Williams died at St. Anthony Central Hospital in Denver from throat cancer. He was 49 years old.

== Personal life ==
Williams was of German descent and grew up in a Protestant background. He became a born again Christian early in his first AJPW run, and prior to that was a Christian believer who in general lacked interest in organized religion. He stated in his book that before becoming closer to God than he already was, he used to "skim the Bible" and also had a difficult time fitting in with more dogmatic and ritualistic churches. Williams also took interest in East Asian religions, having attended Japanese temples while on tour in Japan.

Williams was known for his Christian motivational speaking in personal interviews both before and after being diagnosed with throat cancer. His spiritual views were personal and unconfined by traditional labels, as evidence by his self-identification as "Christian - other" on his MySpace profile.

During the later part of the Attitude Era and Ruthless Aggression Era, Williams was unhappy about the direction WWE was taking and the alienation of the casual fanbase in a March 2002 post. On his website, Williams said, "It is entertainment now, that is all I can say about it. What they do, I don't let my son see it. I don't get into it because most of the time they are doing all of the jawing, they are talking. I want to see wrestling. It seems that you have to pay for the pay-per-view if you want to see wrestling."

Williams would further continue in the post, "I think a lot of parents say that now. It's not a kids' thing. To me, I don't see how you can raise your kid right and have them watch that kind of stuff." In regards to Vince McMahon at the time, Williams said, "Today, anyone can be a wrestler, Vince has proven it. I hate to say this, but I am from the old school. We went out and hooked it up. We beat the crud out of each other, just like I do in Japan still."

During the time of the Chris Benoit double-murder/suicide case in the summer of 2007, Williams was highly critical of Benoit's actions, posting on his website that he found it "very disturbing" as Williams in his book considered Benoit to be a "very close friend". After the details of the case became known, Williams wrote that he "felt no sorrow for Chris Benoit", where he also wrote how he has "always asked God to give me life so that I could LIVE for my son". He also stated that he has "no idea how someone can murder their family and then stick a Bible next to them."

Williams also criticized the mainstream media's disparaging reports on Vince McMahon and the wrestling business over the Benoit incident, not as a defense of McMahon or loyalty to wrestling, but as a symptom of a common issue in sports. Having experience in other sports such as college football, Williams argued, "Every sport has a steroid problem. I can promise you that when I see golfers like Tiger Woods taking steroids, I quit. I know this is funny, but I am sick and tired of CNN, FOX, and other media outlets beating down wrestling and steroids. I don't agree with steroids."

Despite taking McMahon's position regarding Benoit, Williams was critical of McMahon's treatment of his workers, breaking of contracts and sexualization of women, feeling that "Vince is pushing the envelope right now, and if he doesn't watch it, he's going to fall and he's going to fall into the wrong hands".

Williams has routinely stated how he loved Giant Baba "like his own father" during the 1990s, as Williams's father died earlier in 1986. Baba helped Williams during his bouts of depression and various personal problems like Williams's divorce in early 1995, as well as helping him end his drug and pill addiction. Williams got clean after an incident in March 1995 where he resorted to marijuana and other drugs and painkillers to help alleviate his depression from his divorce, sneaking them on a plane with him to Japan. Williams was barred from entering Japan for one year and suspended from AJPW until he got clean, returning to AJPW TV in April 1996.

Upon getting clean and his life back into order thanks to Giant Baba and Williams's faith, even after their divorce Williams and his ex-wife Tammy were still close. While married, they had a son Wyndham, and Williams adopted her daughter, Stormy, from her previous marriage. Even after remarrying, they divorced again later.

== Mixed martial arts record ==
Professional record breakdown
1 match	0 wins	1 loss
By knockout	0	1
By submission	0	0
By decision	0	0

Res.	Record	Opponent	Method	Event	Date	Round	Time	Location	Notes
Loss	0–1	(Belarus) Alexey Ignashov	KO (knees)	K-1 Beast 2004 in Niigata	March 14, 2004	1	0:22	Niigata, Japan	

== Championships and accomplishments ==
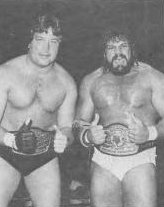
Williams (right) held the Mid-South Tag Team Championship with Ted DiBiase (pictured c. 1986)

- All Japan Pro Wrestling
  - Triple Crown Heavyweight Championship (1 time)
  - World Tag Team Championship (8 times) – with Terry Gordy (5), Johnny Ace (1), Gary Albright (1) and Vader (1)
  - World's Strongest Tag Determination League (1990, 1991) – with Terry Gordy
  - World's Strongest Tag Determination League (2000) – Mike Rotunda
  - January 2 Korakuen Hall Heavyweight Battle Royal (1995, 2000)
- Asylum Championship Wrestling
  - ACW Heavyweight Championship (1 time)
- Cauliflower Alley Club
  - Lou Thesz Award (2008)
- Christian Wrestling Federation
  - CWF Heavyweight Championship (1 time)
- George Tragos/Lou Thesz Professional Wrestling Hall of Fame
  - Class of 2007
- International Wrestling Association of Japan
  - IWA World Tag Team Championship (1 time) – with Ryo Miyake
- Mid-Atlantic Championship Wrestling (Note: This promotion, while operating out of the same area and using some of the same regional championships, is not the same promotion once owned by Jim Crockett Jr. and did not begin operating until the mid-1990s.)
  - MACW Heavyweight Championship (1 time)
- Mid-South Wrestling Association/Universal Wrestling Federation
  - Mid-South Tag Team Championship (2 times) – with Ted DiBiase
  - UWF Heavyweight Championship (1 time)
  - UWF World Tag Team Championship (1 time) – with Ted DiBiase
- Pro Wrestling Illustrated
  - PWI Most Improved Wrestler of the Year (1985)
  - PWI Tag Team of the Year (1992) with Terry Gordy
  - PWI ranked him #8 of the 500 best singles wrestlers of the year in the PWI 500 in 1991.
  - PWI ranked him #78 of the top 500 singles wrestlers of the "PWI Years" in 2003
- Pro Wrestling This Week
  - Wrestler of the Week (July 19–25, 1987)
- Universal Wrestling Federation
  - UWF SportsChannel Television Championship (1 time)
  - UWF World Heavyweight Championship (1 time)
- World Championship Wrestling
  - NWA United States Tag Team Championship (1 time) – with Kevin Sullivan
  - WCW World Tag Team Championship (2 times) – with Mike Rotunda (1) and Terry Gordy (1)
  - NWA World Tag Team Championship (1 time, inaugural) - with Terry Gordy (Note: Gordy and Williams unified the WCW World Tag Team Championship with the NWA World Tag Team Championship after winning the NWA title in a tag team tournament. This happened nearly four years after Ted Turner's purchase of Mid-Atlantic Championship Wrestling from Jim Crockett Jr. He renamed the promotion World Championship Wrestling, but it remained an NWA affiliate until September 1993. As a result, the two titles were separated once more and Gordy and Williams were then recognized as having two separate title reigns with two different titles rather than one unified reign.)
  - NWA World Tag Team Championship Tournament (1992) – Terry Gordy
- World Wrestling Alliance
  - WWF Dojo Battle Royal (1998)
- Wrestling Observer Newsletter
  - Match of the Year (1996) with Johnny Ace vs. Mitsuharu Misawa and Jun Akiyama on June 7 in Tokyo, Japan
  - Most Improved (1985)
  - Strongest Wrestler (1987–1990)
  - Worst On Interviews (1988)
  - Rookie of the Year (1982)
  - Tag Team of the Year (1992) with Terry Gordy
  - Wrestling Observer Newsletter Hall of Fame (Class of 2011)
- WWE
  - WWE Hall of Fame (Class of 2020)

== See also ==
- List of premature professional wrestling deaths
- List of gridiron football players who became professional wrestlers
