= Mike Rotunda =

American professional wrestler (born 1958)

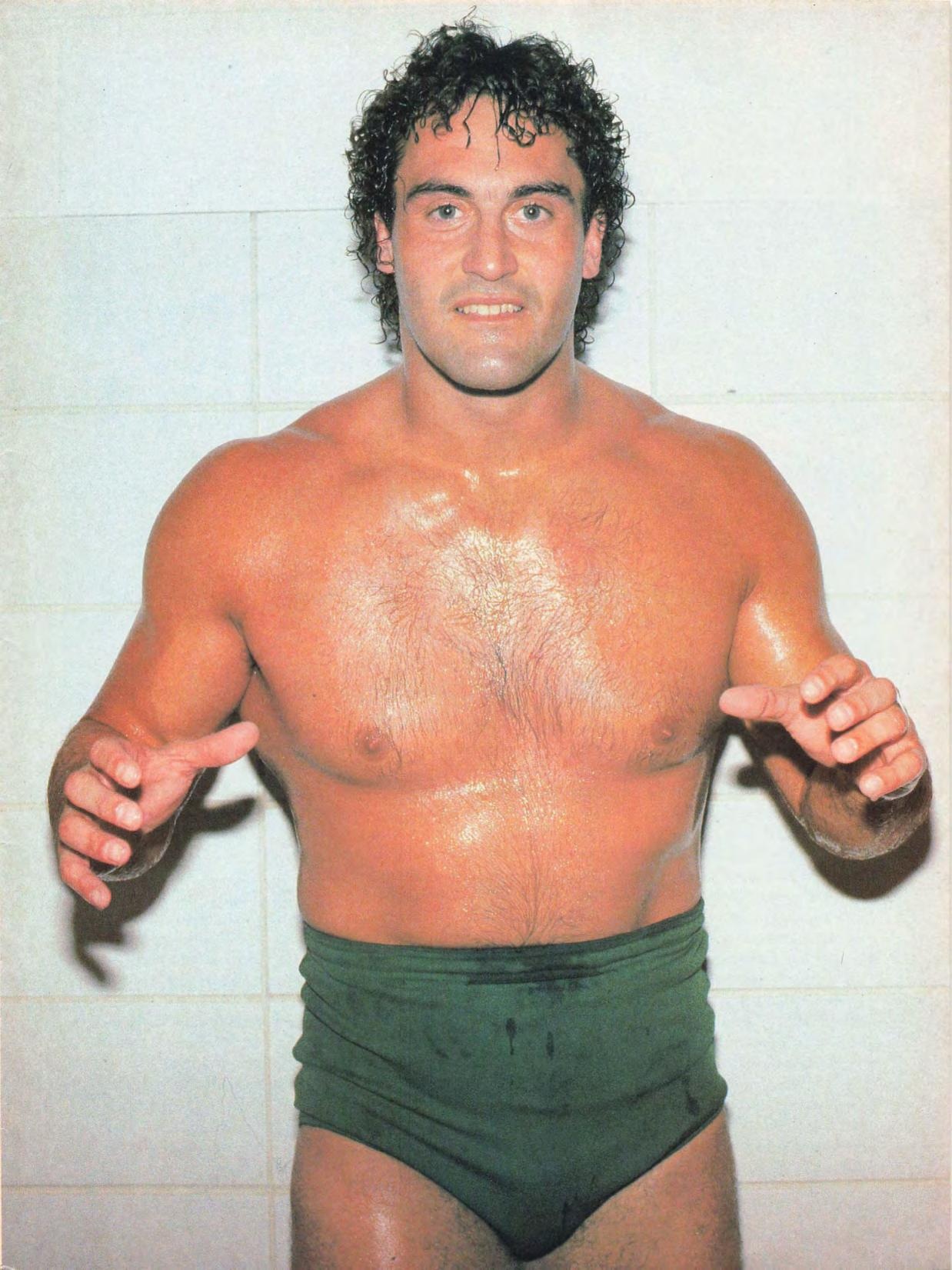
- Rotunda, c. 1983

Personal information
- Born: Lawrence Michael Rotunda Jr. March 30, 1958 (age 68) St. Petersburg, Florida, U.S.
- Education: Syracuse University
- Spouse: Stephanie Windham
- Children: 3, including Bray Wyatt and Bo Dallas
- Family: Blackjack Mulligan (father-in-law); Barry Windham (brother-in-law); Kendall Windham (brother-in-law)

Professional wrestling career
- Ring name(s): Irwin R. Schyster (IRS); Michael Wallstreet; Mike Drond; Mike Rotunda; Mike Rotundo; Mr. Wallstreet; V.K. Wallstreet
- Billed height: 6 ft 3 in (191 cm)
- Billed weight: 248 lb (112 kg)
- Billed from: Syracuse, New York (as Mike Rotunda); Washington, D.C. (as Irwin R. Schyster)
- Trained by: The Destroyer
- Debut: 1981
- Retired: 2007

Lawrence Michael "Mike" Rotunda Jr. (born March 30, 1958) is an American retired professional wrestler. He is best known for his appearances with the World Wrestling Federation and World Championship Wrestling in the 1980s and 1990s under the ring names Mike Rotunda, Mike Rotundo, Michael Wallstreet, Irwin R. Schyster, and V.K. Wallstreet.

Rotunda held numerous singles and tag team championships including the NWA World Tag Team Championship, NWA World Television Championship and WWF World Tag Team Championship. On July 23, 2022, he was inducted into the George Tragos/Lou Thesz Professional Wrestling Hall of Fame and as a member of The U.S. Express, Rotunda and Barry Windham were inducted into the WWE Hall of Fame in April 2024.

== Early life ==
Rotunda was born on March 30, 1958, in St. Petersburg, Florida. He attended Newark Valley High School in Newark Valley, New York. He transferred to Owego Free Academy where he lettered in football and wrestling. He graduated from OFA in 1976. He participated in amateur wrestling, becoming a sectional champion in the 215 lb class in 1976, and placing 4th at the New York State Championships. After graduating from high school, Rotunda attended Syracuse University. He competed in football and amateur wrestling, becoming Eastern Intercollegiate Wrestling Association champion in 1981, in the heavyweight division and becoming a letterwinner in 1977, 1978, 1979 and 1981.

== Professional wrestling career ==
=== Early career (1981–1984) ===
After graduating from Syracuse University, Rotunda traveled to Germany where he trained as a professional wrestler under The Destroyer. He debuted in 1981, wrestling for promotions including Lutte Internationale, Jim Crockett Promotions and Championship Wrestling from Florida.

=== World Wrestling Federation (1984–1986) ===
Rotundo (left) having his arm twisted by Nikita Koloff, c. 1985

Rotunda and Barry Windham joined the World Wrestling Federation as the U.S. Express in 1984, during which time he was billed as Mike Rotundo rather than Rotunda. They won the WWF World Tag Team Championship twice, first from Dick Murdoch and Adrian Adonis in January 1985. The U.S. Express' most notable feud was with The Iron Sheik and Nikolai Volkoff, to whom they lost the title at the first WrestleMania. The U.S. Express regained the belts in June 1985, but lost them two months later to Brutus Beefcake and Greg Valentine. Windham left the WWF soon after. Rotunda continued to wrestle in singles matches until he left the WWF himself, in early 1986.

Rotunda briefly returned to the WWF in the fall of 1986 to team with "Golden Boy" Dan Spivey as a new version of the U.S. Express, but they were more or less used as a jobber team against up-and-coming teams such as Demolition in house shows. They were not considered top contenders.

=== All Japan Pro Wrestling (1986) ===
The U.S. Express reunited in January 1986 in Japan. This would be Rotunda's first tour of Japan.

=== American Wrestling Association (1986) ===
The U.S. Express went to the AWA to wrestle at WrestleRock 86 on April 20, 1986, defeating The Fabulous Ones. The team did not stay long as Windham left the AWA very shortly after debuting. Rotunda stayed around for a few more months with little success.

=== Championship Wrestling from Florida (1987) ===
Rotunda left the WWF in early 1987 and returned to Florida, where he won the NWA Florida Heavyweight Championship in March. There, he feuded with Sir Oliver Humperdink's "Shock Troops" stable.

=== Jim Crockett Promotions / World Championship Wrestling (1987–1991) ===
Rotunda (back) as a member of the Varsity Club, c. 1988

In late-1987, Rotunda joined the National Wrestling Alliance affiliate Jim Crockett Promotions, where he lingered at mid-card level as a face before turning heel and joining Kevin Sullivan's Varsity Club, a group of wrestlers with legitimate amateur wrestling credentials. Rotunda began bickering with fellow Varsity Club member Rick Steiner, a graduate of the University of Michigan, over which of the two had a superior alma mater. This in turn led to the two arguing over which of them was the superior wrestler.

Rotunda won the NWA World Television Championship from Nikita Koloff in January 1988, and subsequently gave his Florida Heavyweight Championship to Steiner. He then began a feud with Jimmy Garvin, because Sullivan wanted Garvin's wife Precious. Steiner left the group and began feuding with Rotunda, the enemies trading the Television Championship before Rotunda lost it to Sting.

"Dr. Death" Steve Williams and Dan Spivey joined the Varsity Club in late 1988, and Rotunda teamed with Williams to win the NWA World Tag Team Championship from the Road Warriors. Referee Theodore Long turned heel during the match and administered a fast three count, enabling Rotunda and Williams to overcome the champions. Long went on to become a manager following the controversial officiating. In May 1989, Williams and Rotunda were stripped of the title. In mid-1989, Sullivan and Rotunda feuded with the Steiner Brothers,

In early-1990, Rotunda turned face, using the shipowner gimmick Captain Mike Rotunda. He formed a "crew" (consisting of Abdullah the Butcher and Norman the Lunatic) and feuded with Kevin Sullivan's new stable, "Sullivan's Slaughterhouse" (Cactus Jack, Buzz Sawyer, and Bam Bam Bigelow).

In mid-1990, Rotunda turned heel again and became Michael Wallstreet, with Alexandra York (and her computer) as his manager. They founded the York Foundation. The two claimed to know (via computer analysis) how to win each match and how long it would take for Wallstreet to become victorious. In this brief run he was undefeated and often a timer was present onscreen to further the duo's claim. The partnership ended when Rotunda left the NWA for a new role in the WWF, in January 1991.

=== New Japan Pro Wrestling (1991) ===
After WCW, Rotunda made his debut in March 1991 for New Japan Pro Wrestling.

=== World Wrestling Federation (1991–1995) ===
==== Singles competition (1991–1992) ====
Rotunda returned to the WWF in April 1991, becoming Irwin R. Schyster, abbreviated to I.R.S.. Schyster had a heel gimmick as a former IRS tax collector from Washington, D.C., harassing wrestlers and fans as "tax cheats" and scolding them to "pay their fair share". For example, at a show in Rhode Island, he attacked the state for being a tax haven for yacht owners from New York, or when wrestling in New Hampshire, he would get on the microphone and criticize the fans there for not having to pay a state income tax. When wrestling in England at SummerSlam 1992, he admonished the crowd for not paying taxes and therefore being a burden on the Royal Family. To further add to this persona, one of his finishing moves was called The Write-Off (i.e., a flying clothesline to an oncoming opponent).

He made his pay-per-view debut at SummerSlam 1991, defeating Greg "The Hammer" Valentine. Schyster also made it to the finals of the 1991 King of the Ring tournament, defeating The Berzerker, Hacksaw Jim Duggan and Jerry Sags before losing to Bret Hart in the final match. He then had a short-lived feud with Big Bossman in the fall of 1991. This culminated in a 6-man elimination tag team match at Survivor Series, where he teamed with The Natural Disasters in a losing effort against Bossman and The Legion of Doom (the former Road Warriors). In January 1992, he competed in the Royal Rumble match entering at number 18 and lasted 28 minutes, giving him the third longest run behind Roddy Piper and winner Ric Flair.

==== Money Inc. (1992–1993) ====
In February 1992, Schyster formed the tag team Money Inc. with Ted DiBiase; the two won the WWF Tag Team Championship together three times and was the dominant Tag-Team of 1992–1993. In the eighteen months Money Inc. were together, they held the titles for a total of almost fourteen months.

Money Inc.'s first title reign was at the expense of The Legion of Doom, making Rotunda the only wrestler to twice defeat them for a tag team title. They then feuded with the Natural Disasters, losing the titles to them and then regaining them a few months later. Finally, in spring 1993, Money Inc. entered into a months long feud with The Steiner Brothers, and in June the two teams traded the titles three times in ten days, with DiBiase and IRS losing the tag team title twice to the Steiners. The feud ended when the two teams faced off in a cage match in which the Steiners won.

In July 1993, Money Inc. began teasing Razor Ramon about losing to The 123 Kid in which Ramon turned face. Ramon faced DiBiase in a singles match at SummerSlam while Schyster faced Kid. Ramon beat DiBiase but Schyster beat Kid. However Money Inc. were to resume teaming and feud with Men on a Mission, but DiBiase took a hiatus from the WWF to wrestle in Japan for a while and thus ending Money Inc.

==== Singles competition; Million Dollar Corporation; departure (1993–1995) ====
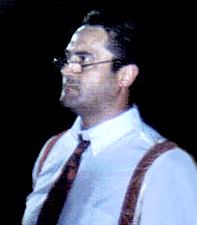
Rotunda as Irwin R. Schyster in 1994

Schyster returned to singles competition and resumed feuding with both Ramon and Kid. Schyster then stole Ramon's gold chains and Ramon and Kid spent months trying to get the gold back. At Survivor Series, Ramon teamed with Kid, Marty Jannetty and Randy Savage (who was subbing for Mr. Perfect) against Schyster, Diesel, Adam Bomb, and Rick Martel in which Ramon's team won but Schyster and Ramon were eliminated halfway through the match. Schyster and Ramon continued to feud which ended at Royal Rumble in a match for the Intercontinental Championship which Schyster won after Shawn Michaels interfered but the match had to be restarted after Michaels' interference and Ramon beat Schyster to retain the belt and get his gold chains back.

In February 1994 after the feud with Ramon ended, Schyster then started a long feud with Tatanka whom Schyster wrestled several times at house shows prior to this feud. The feud began when Tatanka received a sacred headdress from Wahoo McDaniel and Chief Jay Strongbow and Schyster began accusing Tatanka for not paying the taxes for the headdress. After Tatanka beat Kwang on WWF Superstars on April 16, 1994, Schyster came to the ring and attacked Tatanka and tied him in the ropes and took the headdress and destroyed it (the headdress was actually a prop), then Chief Jay Strongbow came to the ring to save Tatanka but Schyster attacked him. Tatanka then tried to challenge Schyster as revenge but the feud quietly ended.

In 1994, Schyster's former partner DiBiase returned but as a manager (and commentator) and formed the Million Dollar Corporation and Schyster quickly joined the stable. Originally the plan was to have Schyster returned to tag team competition and have Barry Windham return as Schyster's partner and form "The New Money Inc." with DiBiase as their manager and have Schyster and Windham start a long feud with Tatanka and Lex Luger. However, Windham wasn't able to sign a deal with the WWF and thus Tatanka turned heel and joined Schyster in the corporation and Schyster began teaming with Bam Bam Bigelow in which they beat The Headshrinkers by disqualification at SummerSlam. The match was supposed to be for the WWF Tag Team Championship, but The Headshrinkers lost the belts to Diesel & Shawn Michaels the night before at a house show.

Schyster later refocused on singles wrestling. His feud with The Undertaker included Schyster repossessing the headstone of a child, and interfering in a Casket Match between The Undertaker and Yokozuna. When the two eventually squared off at the 1995 Royal Rumble, the Undertaker was victorious following a chokeslam, but Schyster stole his urn after the match. I.R.S. then competed less frequently on WWF TV. His final three appearances on TV being a loss to Savio Vega in a King of the Ring qualifying match in June 1995, the July 17, 1995, edition of Monday Night Raw in a losing effort against Shawn Michaels and later that month as a lumberjack at In Your House 2: The Lumberjacks. His final appearance came on July 30, 1995, at a house show in Jean, Nevada, where he unsuccessfully challenged Shawn Michaels for the Intercontinental Championship. Schyster was to start a feud with Duke "The Dumpster" Droese but Rotunda left the WWF in a contract dispute.

=== Return to WCW (1995–2000) ===
==== Debut and New World Order (1995–1997) ====
Rotunda returned to WCW in September 1995. On the debut of WCW Monday Nitro, which aired on September 4, 1995, he was introduced as Michael Wallstreet and cut a promo about the WWF was going through at the time with the New Generation and mentioned the IRS gimmick. By the next episode he was known as V.K. Wallstreet (the "V.K." an allusion to Vincent Kennedy McMahon) with announcer Eric Bischoff asking Bobby Heenan on-air why his name had suddenly changed. Rotunda used the name for nearly a year while wrestling in a lower midcard position. The highlight of this run came at the 1996 Battlebowl, where he teamed with Jim Duggan and made it to the semifinals before losing to Dick Slater and Earl Robert Eaton. Eventually his name returned to Michael Wallstreet and Mr. Wallstreet, and in December 1996, he joined the nWo after being offered a membership by former tag team partner Ted DiBiase. While in the nWo, Wallstreet remained in the low midcard. His highest profile match in this period was a loss to Jeff Jarrett at nWo Souled Out in January 1997. On the April 21 episode of Nitro, Wallstreet was forced out of the nWo when his nWo contract was declared null and void by J. J. Dillon, due to his pre-existing WCW contract. After being forced out of the nWo, he continued to be against WCW by wearing an anti-WCW shirt to the ring and protesting what Dillon said. In the summer of 1997, he left for New Japan Pro-Wrestling and was a member of nWo Japan.

==== Varsity Club reunion and departure (1998, 1999–2000) ====
He made only one appearance for WCW in 1998, under his real name, losing to Booker T. on January 31 at Boston Brawl.

He returned (as Mike Rotunda) to WCW at Starrcade 1999, reforming the Varsity Club with Rick Steiner and Kevin Sullivan to team with Jim Duggan against The Revolution (Shane Douglas, Dean Malenko, Perry Saturn, and Asya). His team lost when they abandoned Duggan during the match. In early 2000, he took part in a "Lethal Lottery" tournament for the vacated WCW World Tag Team Championship, paired with Buzzkill. The two defeated Dean Malenko and Konnan in the first round, but lost in the quarterfinals to the Harris Brothers. Rotunda left WCW in the spring of 2000. He returned to Japan and also made some appearances for the World Wrestling Council in Puerto Rico.

=== New Japan Pro-Wrestling (1997–1999, 2001) ===
Rotunda returned to New Japan Pro-Wrestling in the summer of 1997 (as Michael Wallstreet), where he joined nWo Japan. He toured full-time with New Japan and was used in the midcard. Like many gaijin, he was not used at Dome Shows and was left off New Japan's top tournaments such as the G1 Climax and the Super Grade Tag League tournaments. Wallstreet did participate in two other tournaments. In May 1998, he teamed with Big Titan in a tournament for the vacant IWGP Tag Team Championship, losing in the first round to Kensuke Sasaki and Kazuo Yamazaki. In September 1998, he teamed with Scott Norton in a tournament to decide the #1 contenders for the WCW World Tag Team Championship. They made it to the semifinals, where they lost to eventual tournament winners Kensuke Sasaki and Yuji Nagata.

In 1999, Masahiro Chono left nWo Japan and formed a new group: Team 2000. Wallstreet and nWo Sting followed. Wallstreet, along with the rest of Team 2000, feuded with nWo Japan throughout 1999. In December, Rotunda left New Japan when he was called back to WCW.

He returned on October 28, 2001, for a one-night teaming with Masahiro Chono defeating Hiroyoshi Tenzan and Satoshi Kojima.

=== All Japan Pro Wrestling; IWA Japan (2000–2004) ===
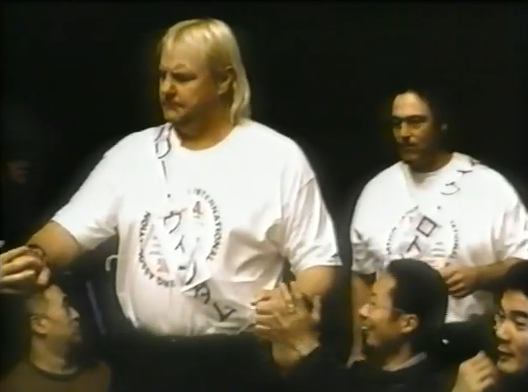
Rotunda (right) and Barry Windham in 2004

Rotunda (as Mike Rotunda) returned to All Japan Pro Wrestling in the summer of 2000, shortly after the Pro Wrestling Noah exodus. He reunited the Varsity Club, this time with "Dr. Death" Steve Williams. The team won the 2000 World's Strongest Tag Determination League and also challenged for the World Tag Team Championship, against Taiyō Kea and Johnny Smith on February 24, 2001, but lost. In late 2001, Rotunda returned to Team 2000 as part of the All Japan branch and returned to New Japan for one match, on October 28, teaming with Chono to defeat Tencozy. Rotunda finished the year teaming with Williams in the 2001 World's Strongest Tag Determination League, which they finished in 5th place with 6 points.

In January 2002, Keiji Mutoh jumped to All Japan and eventually became the owner and president. With the arrival of Mutoh, a growing roster, and nagging injuries, Rotunda returned to the midcard. He entered the 2002 Champion Carnival, finishing in 5th place with 3 points. Shortly after, he entered the Giant Baba Six Man Tag Team Tournament, teaming with Steve Williams and Yoji Anjo. The team made it to the semifinals, losing to Genichiro Tenryu, Arashi, and Nobutaka Araya. On July 20, 2002, Rotunda and Williams entered the Stan Hansen Cup 4-Way, and lost to Mike Barton and Jim Steele, Rotunda being pinned by Barton. In autumn, Rotunda and Williams entered the 2002 World's Strongest Tag Determination League, finishing in 4th place with 9 points. Rotunda left All Japan in early 2003, after wrestling on the New Year's Shining Series Tour.

He worked for IWA Japan from 2003 to 2004.

=== Retirement and sporadic appearances (2004–present) ===
Rotunda retired from professional wrestling on a regular basis in 2004, but still had sporadic matches and makes sporadic appearances.

Rotunda started to run a security company with his wife in 2004.

In 2005, Rotunda teamed up with his brother-in-law Barry Windham at WrestleReunion losing to Larry Zbyszko and Ron Bass.

Rotunda was rehired by WWE as a road agent in 2006 and has made guest appearances as Irwin R. Schyster. One such appearance was on the August 6, 2007, edition of WWE Raw; Mr. McMahon was discussing his IRS troubles with Jonathan Coachman, and when the conversation ended, I.R.S lowered the paper covering his face (Financial Times) and revealed himself.

Rotunda appeared as I.R.S. on the December 10, 2007 15th Anniversary edition of Raw, winning a 15-man Battle Royal, only to be paid by his former tag team partner Ted DiBiase to eliminate himself and give DiBiase the win. This was his final match.

On the March 10, 2008, episode of Raw, The U.S. Express were falsely advertised for a rematch from WrestleMania I against Nikolai Volkoff and The Iron Sheik. Before it could start, Jillian Hall offered to sing "Born in the U.S.A." for them, Rotunda gave her an airplane spin and the show went to commercial, effectively ending the feud.

In early 2009, Rotunda once again appeared as I.R.S in multiple segments of "Top Rope Theatre" on WWE.com. He played a prominent role in the conspiracy of the exclusively online storyline of the series, drawing Kelly Kelly into his schemes in opposition to his arch enemy "Hacksaw" Jim Duggan.

I.R.S. appeared on the September 7, 2009, edition of Raw, which Bob Barker hosted. He played a pricing game (similar to the "One Bid" qualifying segment of The Price Is Right) along with Santino Marella, Jillian Hall, and Chris Jericho.

Rotunda appeared on an episode of Monday Night Raw as a lumberjack in the "'80s Legend Lumberjack Match", in which Christian defeated Ted DiBiase Jr.

On the May 5, 2010 episode of SmackDown, Rotunda helped throw Drew McIntyre out of the arena.

On June 7, 2010, I.R.S appeared on Raw in a comedy segment promoting the new A-Team film. After Ted DiBiase Jr. and Virgil were confronted by A-Team stars Quinton "Rampage" Jackson and Sharlto Copley, in character as B.A. Baracus and H.M. "Howling Mad" Murdoch, respectively, Ted called in his "Uncle Irwin" (an allusion to the long-standing association of DiBiase Jr.'s father the Million Dollar Man Ted DiBiase with I.R.S dating back to Money Inc.) into the room wherein Schyster announced he had repossessed Jerry Lawler's crown, because Lawler had not paid long overdue taxes on the crown's gems. Later in the show, I.R.S, DiBiase Jr., Virgil and Rowdy Roddy Piper were confronted by the A-Team and Dusty Rhodes, who attacked them and reclaimed the crown.

On the June 28 Raw, Rotunda was one of the four people who entered the ring to celebrate Ricky Steamboat's career, but were attacked by the Nexus.

Rotunda appeared on the April 9, 2012, edition of Raw. He, along with numerous other WWE officials and superstars, attempted to break up a brawl between Brock Lesnar and John Cena.

On the January 6, 2014 "Old School" episode of Raw, Irwin R. Schyster encountered Big E Langston on his way to a match and told him to pay his taxes, to which Langston smiled. Immediately prior, Langston walked past fellow Million Dollar Corporation members, Nikolai Volkoff and Ted DiBiase.

He continued work as a WWE road agent and was occasionally seen on TV in 2008.

He was furloughed, along with many other WWE employees, on April 15, 2020, and was officially released on September 10, 2020.

In January 2021, on Raw Legends Night, Rotunda, as I.R.S., made his first appearance since being released by the WWE in a segment backstage with Ric Flair.

On September 3, 2021, the George Tragos/Lou Thesz Professional Wrestling Hall of Fame announced that Rotunda will be inducted into its 2022 Class, along with announcer Jim Ross and Trish Stratus. The induction ceremony took place July 21–23, 2022.

On January 23, 2023, Rotunda, as I.R.S., made a backstage appearance at Raw is XXX alongside Ted DiBiase.

On March 8, 2024, Rotunda, alongside his former tag team partner and brother-in-law Barry Windham, under their U.S. Express gimmick, were announced as the first tag team inductee for the WWE Hall of Fame Class of 2024.

== Personal life ==
Rotunda is married to Stephanie Rotunda (née Windham), the daughter of professional wrestler Blackjack Mulligan, and sister of Barry and Kendall Windham. They have 3 children together, their sons Windham and Taylor were professional wrestlers who worked in WWE, best known as Bray Wyatt and Bo Dallas respectively. They also have a daughter named Mika. Windham died on August 24, 2023.

=== Health ===
On October 28, 2025, Barry Windham stated in an interview with Bill Apter that Rotunda was in hospice care. This was contradicted by Rotunda's daughter Mika, who issued her own statement that her father was not in hospice care, but a rehabilitation center after suffering a massive heart attack a month earlier.

== Championships and accomplishments ==
=== Amateur wrestling ===
- Eastern Intercollegiate Wrestling Association
  - Heavyweight Champion (1981)

=== Professional wrestling ===
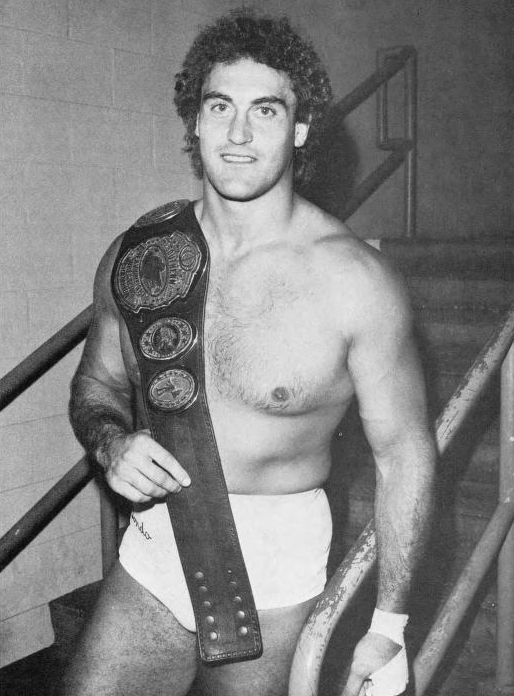
Rotunda as NWA Southern Heavyweight Champion, circa 1983

- All Japan Pro Wrestling
  - World's Strongest Tag Determination League (2000) – with "Dr. Death" Steve Williams
- Championship Wrestling from Florida
  - NWA Florida Heavyweight Championship (3 times)
  - NWA Southern Heavyweight Championship (Florida version) (2 times)
  - NWA United States Tag Team Championship (Florida version) (5 times) – with Mike Davis (1) and Barry Windham (4)
- George Tragos/Lou Thesz Professional Wrestling Hall of Fame
  - Class of 2022
- Jim Crockett Promotions/World Championship Wrestling
  - NWA World Television Championship (3 times)
  - NWA World Tag Team Championship (Mid-Atlantic version) (1 time) – with Steve Williams
- Maple Leaf Wrestling
  - NWA Canadian Television Championship (1 time)
- Pro Wrestling Illustrated
  - Ranked No. 26 of the top 500 wrestlers in the PWI 500 in 1994
  - Ranked No. 164 of the top 500 wrestlers during the PWI Years in 2003
  - Ranked No. 61 of the top 100 tag teams with Ted Dibiase during the PWI Years in 2003
  - Ranked No. 48 of the top 100 tag teams with Barry Windham during the PWI Years in 2003
- World Wrestling Federation
  - WWF Tag Team Championship (5 times) – with Barry Windham (2) and Ted DiBiase (3)
  - WWE Hall of Fame (Class of 2024) as a member of The U.S. Express
  - Slammy Award (1 time)
    - Sweatiest (1994)
- Wrestling Observer Newsletter
  - Best Gimmick (1996) – nWo
  - Feud of the Year (1996) New World Order vs. World Championship Wrestling
