= Jim Steele (wrestler) =

American retired professional wrestler (born 1967)

Personal information
- Born: James Rocha; May 4, 1967 (age 59) New Port Richey, Florida, U.S.

Professional wrestling career
- Ring name(s): Jim Steele; Lacrosse; Love Machine Steele; Love Machine X Wolf Hawkfield
- Billed height: 6 ft 3 in (1.91 m)
- Billed weight: 264 lb (120 kg)
- Trained by: Steve Keirn; Ron Slinker
- Debut: October 1991
- Retired: 2008

James Rocha (born May 4, 1967) is an American retired professional wrestler. He is best known for his appearances with All Japan Pro Wrestling (AJPW) and World Championship Wrestling (WCW) under the ring names Jim Steele and Wolf Hawkfield.

== Professional wrestling career ==
=== Early career (1991–1993) ===
Rocha began his career in Florida for the International Championship Wrestling Alliance in October 1991. He would also wrestle for the United States Wrestling Association (USWA) in Tennessee between February and March 1992.

=== World Championship Wrestling (1993–1994) ===
Rocha trained in the WCW Power Plant and turned pro in late 1993 where he used the name "Jungle" Jim Steele. He worked for WCW for the next year but was not pushed and left the promotion in 1994.

=== Extreme Championship Wrestling (1995) ===
Steele appeared in ECW at Barbed Wire, Hoodies & Chokeslams in June 1995 to face 911.

=== All Japan Pro Wrestling (1994–2002) ===
Steele debuted in All Japan Pro Wrestling in late 1994, where he continued to wrestle as Jim Steele. In late 1994, Steele entered the 1994 World's Strongest Tag Determination League tournament, forming a team with Dan Spivey but the team finished in last place with 2 points. In 1995, Steele was given a new name: Lacrosse but the new name did little for his All Japan career as he spent the next 2 years having little to no direction as he received only 1 title shot at the All Asia Tag Team Championship and was left off tournaments. In early 1997, Steele helped form the Triangle of Power with "Dr. Death" Steve Williams and Gary Albright.

In late 1997, Steele left the Triangle of Power and was given another gimmick becoming Wolf Hawkfield, a gimmick based on the Wolf Hawkfield character from the Virtua Fighter video game series. The character proved to be successful as Steele's stock rose. He formed a team with Johnny Smith and the two entered the 1997 World's Strongest Tag Determination League where they finished in 5th place with 10 points. On January 9, 1998, Hawkfield and Smith defeated Jun Akiyama and Takao Omori to win the All Asia Tag Team Championship. In the spring, Hawkfield then entered the 1998 Champion Carnival but finished in 12th place with 4 points. On October 6, Hawkfield and Smith lost the All Asia Tag Team Championship to Tamon Honda and Jun Izumida.

Following the title loss, Hawkfield's stock once again dropped as he wasn't used for either the 1998 World's Strongest Tag Determination League or the 1999 Champion Carnival and he also received no title shots in 1999. Hawkfield returned to an All Japan tournament by entering the 1999 World's Strongest Tag Determination League teaming with Gary Albright but they finished in 7th place with 2 points. In early 2000, Hawkfield entered the 2000 Champion Carnival, but lost in the first round to Jun Izumida. In the summer of 2000, Mitsuharu Misawa left All Japan and went on to form Pro Wrestling NOAH. Misawa would ultimately take the majority of the native roster and a few foreigners with him. Hawkfield, along with the majority of the gaijin side, remained in All Japan. Following the exodus, Hawkfield reverted to Jim Steele and formed a new tag team with Mike Barton. The new team entered the 2000 World's Strongest Tag Determination League where they finished in 4th place with 10 points.

In 2001, Steele entered the 2001 Champion Carnival where he finished in 8th place with 2 points. For the rest of 2001, Steele would continue to team with Barton. In the fall of 2001, the two joined the All Japan Branch of Masahiro Chono's stable: Team 2000. In late 2001, Steele and Barton entered the 2001 G1 Tag League where they became the runners-up, losing to Tencozy in the finals. In 2002, Steele would have a busy year as he and Barton challenged for the World Tag Team Championship on two occasions but came up short each time. In the spring, Steele entered the 2002 Champion Carnival finishing in 3rd place with 6 points. In the summer, Steele and Barton won the Stan Hansen Cup in a four-way tag team match. By the end of 2002, Steele and Barton left All Japan and signed with New Japan Pro-Wrestling.

=== New Japan Pro-Wrestling (2001–2004) ===
Steele and Barton entered New Japan in the fall of 2001. They entered the 2002 Triathlon Tournament teaming with Yuji Nagata. They made it to the finals but lost to Manabu Nakanishi, Osamu Nishimura, and Yutaka Yoshie. In February 2003, Steele and Barton entered a #1 Contenders Tournament for the IWGP Tag Team Championship which they emerged victorious defeating Makai Club members: Tadao Yasuda and Kazunari Murakami, unfortunately the title match would be delayed when Steele suffered a leg injury putting him out for months. After recovering from his injury, Steele returned in the fall of 2003 as he teamed with Barton in the 2003 G1 Tag League. During the tag league, Steele and Barton would receive their IWGP Tag Team Title shot against champions: Hiroshi Tanahashi and Yutaka Yoshie, but they lost. In the tag league, Steele and Barton finished in 6th place with 6 points. After a few more months in New Japan, Steele and Barton left in early 2004.

=== Return to All Japan Pro Wrestling (2004) ===
In late 2004, Steele returned to All Japan now using the gimmick Love Machine Steele. Steele teamed with the GREAT MUTA in the 2004 World's Strongest Tag Determination League but the team finished 4th place in their block with 4 points. After the tournament, Steele left All Japan again.

=== World Wrestling Council (1997–1998, 2001–2002, 2005, 2008) ===
During his time in Japan, Steele competed for the World Wrestling Council promotion in Puerto Rico. In November 2001, Steele won the WWC Puerto Rican Championship, but lost the title three weeks later. Steele worked for WWC on and off until 2008, in which he retired shortly thereafter.

== Championships and accomplishments ==
- All Japan Pro Wrestling
  - All Asia Tag Team Championship (1 time) - with Johnny Smith
  - Stan Hansen Cup (2002) - with Mike Barton
- New Japan Pro-Wrestling
  - IWGP Tag Team Championship #1 Contenders Tournament (2003) - with Mike Barton
- Pro Wrestling Illustrated
  - PWI ranked him 143 of the 500 best singles wrestlers in the PWI 500 in 1999
- World Wrestling Council
  - WWC Puerto Rico Heavyweight Championship (1 time)
  - WWC Television Championship (1 time)
