= Ryuji Hijikata =

Japanese professional wrestler (born 1978)

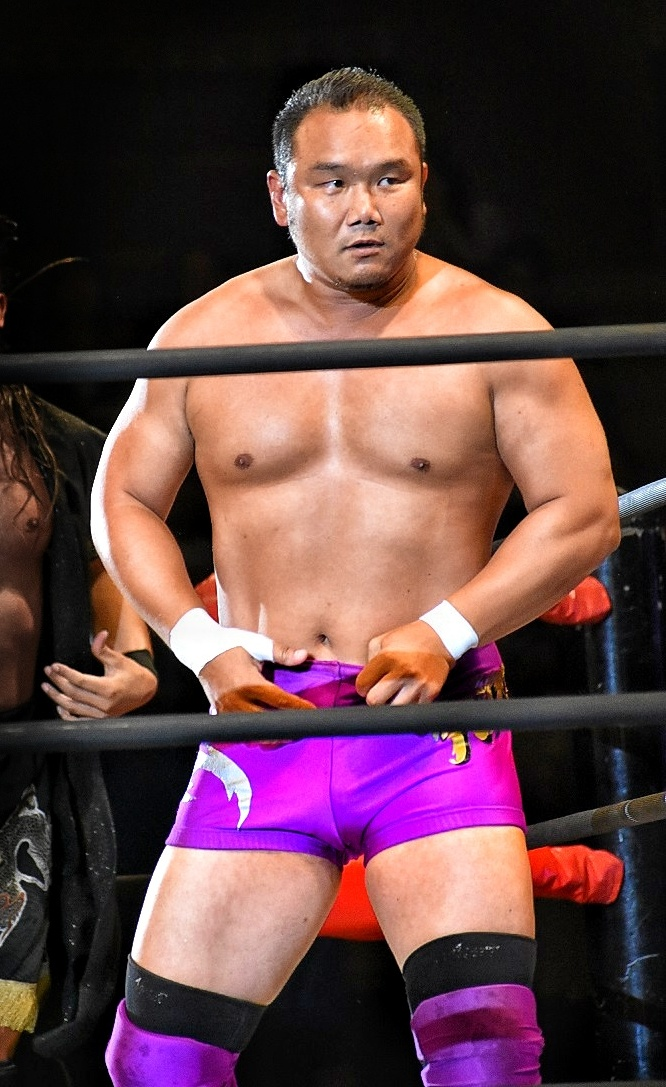
- Professional wrestler Ryuji Hijikata

Personal information
- Born: May 17, 1978 (age 48) Sayama, Saitama, Japan

Professional wrestling career
- Ring names: Ryuji Hijikata; Toshizō
- Billed height: 1.75 m (5 ft 9 in)
- Billed weight: 95 kg (209 lb)
- Trained by: All Japan Pro Wrestling; Yuki Ishikawa
- Debut: February 7, 1998

Ryuji Hijikata (土方 隆司, Hijikata Ryūji) (born May 17, 1978) is a Japanese professional wrestler also known under the ring name Toshizo (歳三, Toshizō). Hijikata is best known for his tenure in Battlarts and All Japan Pro Wrestling since 2002 where he is a former World Junior Heavyweight Champion.

== Professional wrestling career ==
=== BattlARTS (1998–2002) ===
After a judo career in high school, Hijikata joined professional wrestling promotion BattlARTS in 1998. He feuded with Junji Tanaka before rising through the ranks and wrestled extensively in Michinoku Pro Wrestling, Frontier Martial-Arts Wrestling, All Japan Pro Wrestling and Toryumon Mexico as part of working agreements. However, despite teaming up with his mentor and promotion ace Yuki Ishikawa at several points, he never reached top status. In 2001, Hijikata signed up full-time with AJPW.

=== All Japan Pro Wrestling (2001–2017) ===
Hijikata wrestled in AJPW as a junior heavyweight for years, with mixed success. In 2004, he adopted a mask and the name of Toshizo (歳三), inspired on the historical Toshizo Hijikata. He challenged Taka Michinoku for the AJPW World Junior Heavyweight Championship in June 2005, but he lost, after which he took off his mask as a sign of respect for Taka.

In 2008, Hijikata managed to win the Junior Tag League alongside Katsuhiko Nakajima on March 23. A little over a month later, Hijikata continued his success by defeating Silver King for the World Junior Heavyweight Champion on April 29. He held the championship for nearly five whole months before losing it to Naomichi Marufuji on September 28. Following his title reign, Hijikata took part in the All Asia Tag Team Championship tournament in January 2009, where he teamed up with former Triple Crown Heavyweight Champion Suwama, but they were unsuccessful in winning the tournament and the title.

Following this, Hijikata resumed using his Toshizo ring name and gimmick and, alongside Minoru, joined Voodoo Murders after betraying his partner Kaz Hayashi. Soon after joining VDM, Toshizo managed to his second consecutive Junior Tag League alongside Minoru, giving both an opportunity to compete for the World Junior Heavyweight Title, although they were unsuccessful in defeating Kaz Hayashi for the title. Following this, Hijikata left AJPW in August 2010. He eventually returned in 2013, working as a freelancer.

=== Total Nonstop Action Wrestling (2004) ===
In 2004, Hijikata made his Total Nonstop Action Wrestling debut as he competed as a member of Team Japan with Mitsu Hirai, Jr., Taichi Ishikari, and Nosawa in TNA's World X Cup Tournament.

=== Wrestle-1 (2017–2020) ===
In November 2017, Hijikata debuted in Wrestle-1.

== Championships and accomplishments ==
- All Japan Pro Wrestling
  - All Asia Tag Team Championship (1 time) – with Minoru
  - Gaora TV Championship (1 time)
  - World Junior Heavyweight Championship (1 time)
  - Junior Tag League (2008) – with Katsuhiko Nakajima
  - Junior Tag League (2009) – with Minoru
- Tenryu Project
  - Tenryu Project International Junior Heavyweight Championship (1 time)
