= Gran Naniwa =

Japanese professional wrestler (1977 – 2010)

Personal information
- Born: Yoshikuni Kimura; February 15, 1977 Ibaraki Prefecture
- Died: October 6, 2010 (aged 33)

Professional wrestling career
- Ring name(s): Gran Naniwa; The Claw
- Billed height: 1.77 m (5 ft 10 in)
- Billed weight: 98 kg (216 lb)
- Trained by: Great Sasuke
- Debut: June 2, 1993
- Retired: October 3, 2009

Yoshikuni Kimura (木村 吉公, Kimura Yoshikuni) (February 15, 1977 – October 6, 2010) was a Japanese professional wrestler, better known by the ring name Gran Naniwa (愚乱・浪花, Guran Naniwa). Naniwa was known for his comedic gimmick, in which he performed mannerisms of crabs. This was also reflected upon in the design of his wrestling mask.

== Professional wrestling career ==
Naniwa debuted professionally in 1993 in Michinoku Pro Wrestling as a face. He participated in the 1995 Super J-Cup, managing to get to the quarterfinals, but he was later eliminated by eventual winner Jyushin Thunder Liger. In the late 1990s, Naniwa competed in the United States for Extreme Championship Wrestling (ECW). He was supposed to wrestle at ECW's first pay-per-view ECW Barely Legal in 1997 but an injury necessitated his replacement by Masato Yakushiji. He wrestled Gran Hamada in January 1998 at the ECW House Party event. After this, Naniwa took a brief hiatus for a few years but made his return in 2006, again under his Gran Naniwa ring name, competing in a match for New Japan Pro-Wrestling's now defunct WRESTLE LAND "brand".

== Death ==
Kimura died on October 6, 2010, due to a heart attack at the age of 33.

== Championships and accomplishments ==
- Michinoku Pro Wrestling

- Central American Middleweight Championship (1 time)
