= Voice acting in Royal Space Force: The Wings of Honnêamise =

Voice acting in the 1987 anime film

For the debut work of anime studio Gainax, the 1987 anime film Royal Space Force: The Wings of Honnêamise, director Hiroyuki Yamaga set a goal of "natural" dialogue, which he maintained was "a first in Japanese animation." The performers chosen to portray the lead characters, Leo Morimoto as Shirotsugh and Mitsuki Yayoi as Riquinni, were professional actors who nevertheless had little to no experience working in anime. At the same time, Gainax sought out and recruited as Royal Space Force's sound director the highly experienced Atsumi Tashiro of Group TAC, known for his work on the 1974 TV series Space Battleship Yamato. Tashiro accepted the staff position on Royal Space Force despite it being the first project he had undertaken outside his own company in over 20 years, seeing it as a chance to revitalize himself professionally, and the casting of Morimoto and Yayoi as an opportunity to depict genuine emotion and honest and fresh reactions, a spirit that Tashiro remarked he had forgotten within the world of anime.

In contrast to the out-of-order production of the anime's visuals, the voice recording was done in sequential order, with actors uncertain of their roles at the beginning, but eventually confident enough to not need direction and to ad-lib lines. Morimoto and Yayoi, among other cast members, expressed views about the growth and inner life of the characters they portrayed. Voice cameo roles included the famous Japanese newscaster Kazuo Tokumitsu, whose network NTV was collaborating on the film's publicity, as well from one of the film's assistant directors, Takami Akai; actors of foreign origin were retained to voice characters from the Kingdom of Honnêamise's rival nation, the Republic. One of several aspects of the dismay Toshio Okada would express over the Star Quest dub being recorded for Royal Space Force's Hollywood premiere was its use of only seven actors to portray the film's roles, whereas the Japanese original used over 40 to give even minor roles a distinct "color."

== Voice acting ==
=== Recruiting sound director ===
The voice performances in Royal Space Force were supervised by Atsumi Tashiro of the anime studio Group TAC. Tashiro, who had been sound director for the highly influential 1974 TV series Space Battleship Yamato and subsequent Yamato movies, as well as for the 1985 Gisaburo Sugii film Night on the Galactic Railroad, remarked that in the more than 20 years of his career, Royal Space Force was the first time he had agreed to direct the sound for a work made outside his own company. Gainax had been enthusiastic in pursuing Tashiro's involvement, first sending him the script of the film, followed by a visit from Yamaga and Okada to explain the script, after which, Tashiro joked, he still couldn't understand it, even with several follow-up meetings. Despite his initial difficulty in grasping the project, however, Tashiro was struck by the passion and youth of the filmmakers, and felt that working with them on Royal Space Force would represent an opportunity to "revitalize" himself professionally. Tashiro's relationship with the studio would continue after the film into Gainax's next two productions: their first OVA series Gunbuster, which modeled the character Captain Tashiro upon him, and their debut TV show, Nadia: The Secret of Blue Water, in which Group TAC was closely involved.

In the director's commentary, Yamaga remarked that he "wanted the dialogue to be natural," which he maintained was "a first in Japanese animation." Akai felt that a tone had been set for Royal Space Force by the decision to cast Leo Morimoto in the lead role as Shirotsugh: "The other actors knew that this was going to be a different kind of animated film when we cast Leo." Morimoto was a 43-year old veteran actor in live-action films and TV but had very limited experience in anime, whereas Mitsuki Yayoi, cast as Riquinni after Gainax had heard her on the radio, was a stage actor and member of the Seinenza Theater Company with some voice-over experience, but who had never before played an anime role. While remarking that there were already many professional voice actors who were suited to animation work, Tashiro saw the casting of Morimoto and Yayoi as a great opportunity for him, asserting that the apprehension the performers felt due to their mutual unfamiliarity with the field meant that they approached their roles as an actual encounter, with genuine emotion and reactions that were honest and fresh, a spirit that Tashiro said he had forgotten within the world of anime.

=== Perspective of lead actors ===
Morimoto remarked during a recording session for the film in late November 1986 that Tashiro directed him not to play the role of Shirotsugh as if it were an anime, but rather to attempt the flavor of a live performance, noting in a later interview that Yamaga had given him the same instructions. He commented that it was a difficult role for him, as unlike a live-action drama, "you can't fake the mood, you have to express yourself correctly with just your voice," and viewed his work on Royal Space Force as "scary" but "fulfilling." Although evaluating the character himself as "not a great hero," Morimoto at the same time said that he found much that was convincing in Shirotsugh's growth in the film, feeling that it somehow came to assume the role of history's own progression: "What is to be found at the end of that maturation is gradually revealed, arriving at a magnificent place." He added he was "shocked that a 24-year old could make such a film ... I'm glad to know that [creators] like this are making their debut, and I hope that more of them do." Asked what he wanted people to particularly watch for in the film, Morimoto answered that most adults, by which he included himself, "talk a lot about 'young people these days,' and so forth. But the truth is these young people who hear that from us are able to be clear about this world with an ease adults no longer possess. They have a firm grasp of history, and they don't shy away from the parts in this film that adults have avoided; they call out the lies, while at the same time, each one of them puts in their work with sincerity."

Yayoi commented that Yamaga had described Riquinni to her as "uncompromising in her beliefs, and this could be seen as hardheadedness and causing problems or discomfort to those around her. But also that she could look upon something truly beautiful, yet not respond simply by thinking that yes, it is beautiful, but might ponder it, and wonder if it genuinely is. It's not a disability or a deliberate obstacle [in her character], but just that people around her would honestly think that this girl is a little bit weird." Yayoi understood Riquinni as a "normal girl" who, to the extent she was out of step with everyday life, was not so much because she was strange on the inside, but because her relationships with the exterior world were governed by her strong will; Yayoi suggested that the film is her coming-of-age story as well. Asked if there was anything she felt in common with Riquinni, Yayoi, herself in her early 20s, spoke first of their shared youth, and how while Riquinni's personal way of expressing her authenticity was through her religious beliefs, authenticity was a widely shared ideal of young people, and in that sense Riquinni represented "the parts of me that are genuine." Yayoi however could imagine herself also as sometimes expressing those genuine feelings directly, and sometimes holding them back with measured speech, interpreting Shirotsugh and Riquinni's final rendezvous in the film as an example of the latter; rather than any dramatic statements or tears, she noted, Riquinni simply ends the encounter with an itterasshai ("come back soon") as he departs. "But in her heart," said Yayoi, "she's thinking, 'Well, this will be the last time we meet,' laughing to the interviewer, 'Don't we all know what that feels like?'"

Minoru Uchida, another veteran actor with little history in anime, voiced the role of General Khaidenn. Uchida joked that he found his own thoughts very much overlapped with those of the General, whom he saw as someone with ideals from his youth that had run into barriers. He remarked that when asked to voice the character, he had already been an actor for over 30 years, and what interested him about the film was that he felt it let him know what was truly on the mind of younger people; while he worked regularly with young actors in theater, Uchida felt that what he described as the "nonchalant" attitude of their generation meant that he would not learn their true feelings in the course of his professional interactions. The most prominent part in the film actually performed by an experienced anime voice actor was that of Marty Tohn, portrayed by Kazuyuki Sogabe, whom Akai noted also assisted on giving direction with some of the other voice actors.

=== Engagement of cast ===
In contrast to the animation itself on Royal Space Force, whose scenes were completed out of sequence before being edited together, the dialogue was recorded in sequence; Yamaga commented that at the beginning of the film, "everyone was unsure of their character. But by the end of the project, I no longer needed to give any direction," to the extent, Akai noted, that Morimoto ad-libbed Shirotsugh's song upon arriving at the rocket launch site guarded by dummy tanks. Yamaga suggested that an emphasis in Japanese voice acting upon clear voice projection worked against a realistic-sounding delivery in certain circumstances such as military communications or PA announcements, citing the performances Mamoru Oshii later obtained in the Patlabor anime as an example of what he wished he could have achieved for Royal Space Force. Akai himself had a voice cameo as the soldier giving orders outside the Defense Ministry shortly before the General's meeting with his superiors. The reporter whose voice is heard in the newsreel of Shiro's training regimen and the exterior shots before his abortive TV interview was Kazuo Tokumitsu, at the time host of the nationwide weekday morning television show Zoom In!! Morning! on NTV; the network, which was collaborating on the film's publicity, had requested halfway through production that the movie feature voices from their talent base. Yamaga and Akai remarked that by this stage only the news voice-overs were available, and it was too late to redraw the newsreel reporter so that he actually resembled Tokumitsu; they recalled being a bit embarrassed at how the situation had caused the network a certain offense. Actors with a foreign background were employed to portray the voices of characters from the Republic, whose dialogue was delivered in a made-up language; an example being the role of Republic minister Nereddon, voiced by Willie Dorsey, a black American actor resident in Japan who had previously appeared in several Sonny Chiba films, including The Executioner. Akai and Yamaga noted that one of the film's three assistant directors, Shoichi Masuo, was "an expert in voice actors" and "would find unknown actors doing bit parts on the radio and bring them in to audition for various roles." In his 2010 memoir, Okada recalled his dismay at finding out that the Star Quest dub being recorded for Royal Space Force's Hollywood premiere intended to use only seven actors to voice the English version, contrasting it to the over 40 performers used in the Japanese original, and its assignment of special actors even to voice characters with only two or three lines, to give them each a distinct "color."
