= Mitsuharu Misawa =

Japanese professional wrestler (1962–2009)

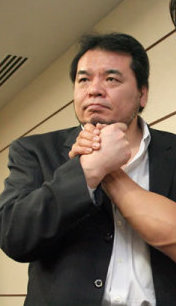
- Misawa in May 2009

Personal information
- Born: Mitsuharu Kotake; June 18, 1962 Yūbari, Hokkaido, Japan
- Died: June 13, 2009 (aged 46) Hiroshima, Japan
- Cause of death: Cervical fracture causing atlanto-axial dislocation
- Spouse: Mayumi Shiina (m. 1988)
- Children: 2

Professional wrestling career
- Ring names: Mitsuharu Misawa; Tiger Mask (II); Kamikaze Misawa
- Billed height: 1.85 m (6 ft 1 in)
- Billed weight: 115 kg (255 lb); 104 kg (230 lb) (as Tiger Mask II)
- Billed from: Saitama, Japan
- Trained by: Dick Beyer; Dory Funk Jr.; Giant Baba; The Great Kabuki; Kazuharu Sonoda; La Fiera; Lou Thesz
- Debut: August 21, 1981

Mitsuharu Misawa (三沢 光晴, Misawa Mitsuharu; born Mitsuharu Kotake (小竹 光晴), June 18, 1962 – June 13, 2009) was a Japanese professional wrestler and promoter. He spent most of his career with All Japan Pro Wrestling (AJPW), where he became the promotion's leading wrestler during the 1990s, before founding Pro Wrestling Noah in 2000. Misawa was one of AJPW's Four Heavenly Kings (プロレスの四天王, Puroresu no shiten'nō), alongside Toshiaki Kawada, Kenta Kobashi, and Akira Taue; their matches became closely associated with AJPW's ōdō, or King's Road, style.

Misawa debuted for AJPW in 1981 and wrestled as the second Tiger Mask from 1984 until unmasking in 1990. His victory over Jumbo Tsuruta that June established him as a rising main-event wrestler, and after Tsuruta's career was curtailed by illness, Misawa became AJPW's principal star. He won the Triple Crown Heavyweight Championship five times; his first reign, from 1992 to 1994, lasted 705 days, the longest in the championship's history. His rivalry with Kawada produced their June 3, 1994 match, which has been cited as one of the greatest professional wrestling matches of all time and became especially influential among overseas fans through tape trading.

After Giant Baba died in 1999, Misawa became president of AJPW, but conflicts with Baba's widow and majority shareholder Motoko Baba led to his removal from the position in May 2000. He then led most of AJPW's native roster out of the company and founded Pro Wrestling Noah, serving as its president and one of its leading wrestlers. Misawa became the inaugural GHC Heavyweight Champion and held the title three times. As Noah's business declined in the later 2000s, he continued wrestling a full schedule despite accumulating injuries and worked to establish younger wrestlers as the promotion's future stars.

On June 13, 2009, Misawa died at age 46 after taking a back suplex during a tag-team match in Hiroshima. The reported injury was a cervical fracture resulting in atlanto-axial dislocation. His death prompted renewed discussion in Japan about the regulation and safety of professional wrestling. Over his career, Misawa was an eight-time world champion, winning the Triple Crown five times and the GHC Heavyweight Championship three times, and he was named Wrestler of the Year by the Wrestling Observer Newsletter in 1995, 1997, and 1999.

== Early life ==
Misawa was born Mitsuharu Kotake (小竹 光晴, Kotake Mitsuharu) in Yūbari, Hokkaidō, but the family moved to Koshigaya, Saitama, as the coal mine where his father worked declined. Originally, his name was supposed to be Hideki, but was changed to Mitsuharu after his mother was denied honors.

Misawa had an older brother, who was favored by his father. According to Misawa, his father was violent towards his mother Akiko Misawa, and once stabbed her with a kitchen knife; they divorced during his first year of elementary school and, thus, Mitsuharu and his brother took Misawa as their surname. Misawa won a long jump competition held by Koshigaya in elementary school, and joined the gymnastics club in junior high.

=== Amateur wrestling ===
Misawa was a fan of professional wrestling, especially All Japan Pro Wrestling, from an early age, and his first favorite wrestlers were Horst Hoffman and Jumbo Tsuruta. Hoffman's emerald green trunks would later be emulated by Misawa. Misawa had wanted to pursue a vocation as a professional wrestler since he was 12, and planned to do so after completing junior high, but his mother and teacher persuaded him to continue his studies so that he could attend a school with a good amateur wrestling program. Misawa attended the high school at the Ashikaga Institute of Technology in Tochigi on a scholarship, alongside Toshiaki Kawada, who was a year below him. They shared an interest in athletics and professional wrestling before they became professional wrestlers themselves. Misawa wanted to drop out in his second year to begin training, but during an encounter with Jumbo Tsuruta, he convinced Misawa to complete high school education, and to concentrate on amateur wrestling if he was serious about professional wrestling. Wrestling at 187 pounds (84.8 kilograms), Misawa won the national high school championship in 1980, and in the same year he placed fifth at the freestyle World Championships, competing in the junior age group. (Note: Misawa's amateur wrestling coach, Yamato Oshimo, also trained Kawada to a national championship in 1981 when he defeated Keiichi Yamada.) Despite his success, Misawa disliked amateur wrestling, and only saw it as a means to an end for a career in professional wrestling.

== Professional wrestling career ==
=== All Japan Pro Wrestling (1981–2000) ===
==== Debut and early years (1981–1984) ====
Misawa entered the All Japan Pro Wrestling (AJPW) training camp in March 1981, and was trained mainly by Kazuharu Sonoda and Akihisa Takachihō, though he also received training from Dick "The Destroyer" Beyer, Shohei Baba, Dory Funk Jr., and eventually Lou Thesz. He made his professional debut on August 21, 1981, where he lost against Shiro Koshinaka in an outdoor show in Urawa. After losing his first seventeen consecutive matches, Misawa had his first win on October 9 in a tag match with Mitsuo Momota against Hiromichi Fuyuki and Nobuyoshi Sugawara, and won his first singles match against Sugawara four nights later. In April 1983, Baba held a round-robin tournament for AJPW's lower-ranked wrestlers called the Lou Thesz Cup, and Misawa entered the tournament alongside Koshinaka, Fuyuki, Mitsuo and brother Yoshihiro Momota, Sugawara, Kawada, and Tarzan Goto. Misawa reached the finals, and on April 22 in the Nakajima Sports Center, Misawa made his televised debut in the final match for the Lou Thesz Cup (which Thesz himself refereed), again wrestling Koshinaka to a loss. Baba had intended to send the tournament winner on a foreign excursion, but while Misawa lost the match, he was perceived as the superior talent, despite Koshinaka being three years his senior, so Baba decided to send them both. Misawa had his first title match on May 20, when he and Koshinaka unsuccessfully challenged Mighty Inoue and Ashura Hara for the attende.

Misawa and Koshinaka arrived in Mexico on March 16, 1984, where they wrestled for EMLL as a tag team under the names Samurai Shiro and the Kamikaze (or Kamikaze Misawa). Misawa improved his aerial skills under the guidance of La Fiera, and on April 5, Misawa had his first major singles championship match, headlining Arena México and wrestling NWA World Middleweight champion El Satánico to a loss. This excursion was meant to last one year, but Baba called Misawa and asked him if he could "jump from the corner post", and when Misawa replied that he could, he was called back.

==== Tiger Mask and unmasking (1984–1990) ====
For the rest of the decade, and into spring 1990, Misawa wrestled as the second generation Tiger Mask, succeeding Satoru Sayama, as Baba purchased the rights to the character's likeness from Tiger Mask mangaka Ikki Kajiwara. Misawa debuted as the character at a July 31 show in the Kuramae Kokugikan, and in his first match he defeated La Fiera at the sold-out Denen Coliseum on August 26. (Note: As Misawa had overtaken him, Koshinaka was lured to New Japan Pro-Wrestling.) Misawa would notably work with Jerry Estrada and Pirata Morgan over the rest of the year.

In 1985, Baba would bring in top junior-heavyweight talents and high flyers to further establish the new Tiger Mask, including the Dynamite Kid and Kuniaki Kobayashi, the premier rivals of the original. While he was Sayama's most notable rival during his time as Tiger Mask, the Dynamite Kid had signed with the WWF by this time, so Kobayashi became Misawa's most notable feud in this period. Their first match on February 1 ended in double disqualification, when Kobayashi ripped up Misawa's mask and busted him open by running him into the ring post. A rematch at Sumo Hall on March 9 ended in double count-out. On June 21, in his first match at Nippon Budokan, Misawa unsuccessfully challenged Kobayashi for the NWA International Junior Heavyweight Championship in a match rated the best of the year by the readers of the Wrestling Observer Newsletter. Misawa blew out his knee before the match, and still delivered a "great performance" in what wrestling journalist and historian Dave Meltzer called "the best match of the Tiger Mask era", but he would require surgery afterward. The aerial style which Misawa had been made to adopt under the Tiger Mask II gimmick strained his knees. According to Masanobu Fuchi, Misawa was actually more interested in working a ground-based style, and years later, he would comment that it was more difficult to elicit crowd reaction when working under the hood. Nonetheless, since the audience expected the superhuman from the Tiger Mask character, crowds were more difficult to impress during this period than they were after his unmasking. Upon his return, the Tiger Mask-Kobayashi program culminated on August 31 when Misawa won the title from Kobayashi in a rematch, with a variation of the tiger suplex wherein one of Misawa's hands was used to put Kobayashi in a half nelson before lifting him; this would become known as the Tiger Suplex '85. After a successful defense in Aizuwakamatsu against Chavo Guerrero Sr. on October 28, Baba graduated Misawa to the heavyweight class due to his knee problems, and the championship was vacated in March 1986. While he did not stop performing aerial maneuvers, Misawa would use them more sparingly going forward.

On April 19, 1986, Misawa and Baba participated in the Crockett Cup, a single-elimination tag team tournament held at the Louisiana Superdome. They reached the quarterfinals, where they lost to eventual second-place team Ronnie Garvin and Magnum T. A. The next day, Misawa was taken to the AWA's WrestleRock 86 event by Stan Hansen, where he defeated Buck Zumhofe. Misawa entered his first World's Strongest Tag Determination League (WSTDL) in 1986 alongside Baba, where his role was to lose pinfalls when they faced that year's star teams. The pair would tie for sixth place with three wins, three losses, and one double count-out. The next March, Misawa was defeated in his only match against then-NWA champion Ric Flair. Misawa transitioned into being Tsuruta's occasional tag partner as Tsuruta's feud with Genichiro Tenryu became AJPW's main program. On July 3, Misawa and Tsuruta won the PWF World Tag Team Championship from Ted DiBiase and Stan Hansen by count-out, which they held for eight days before dropping them back to the previous champions. In what was then "the biggest singles win of his career", according to Meltzer, Misawa pinned DiBiase on July 19. For the 1987 WSTDL, Misawa entered alongside Shinichi Nakano, and the two tied for eighth place, with three wins, seven losses, and one double count-out. On the undercard of the WSTDL final, Misawa faced Kawada for the first time inside the Budokan, in the context of a tag match pitting himself and Takashi Ishikawa against Kawada and Fuyuki, and he pinned Kawada with a Tiger suplex.

On AJPW's first event of 1988, Misawa wrestled an AWA World Heavyweight Championship match against Curt Hennig. Misawa won by countout, but the title did not change hands. This was very controversial at the time, since titles frequently changed hands via countout in Japan. For that year's WSTDL, Misawa teamed with Jimmy Snuka, where they tied for seventh place with seven points. In a tag match held during the League but not towards it, Misawa had his first match against Kenta Kobashi (teaming with Ishikawa) on November 24, which he and Snuka won. On March 8, 1989, in the penultimate match of a card at the Nippon Budokan, Misawa received an NWA title shot against Ricky Steamboat, which he lost. He ruptured his left anterior cruciate ligament during the match, and was inactive for the rest of 1989.

Misawa returned after his injury by participating in a main-event battle royal at Korakuen Hall in Tokyo on January 2, 1990, the first date of AJPW's New Year Giant Series. On February 10, Misawa would wrestle for the first time inside the Tokyo Dome, though not in an AJPW event. NJPW president Seiji Sakaguchi asked Baba to help the company with their second Tokyo Dome show after plans with WCW fell through, and he agreed under the condition that the AJPW wrestlers would not be beaten or made to look weak. Misawa teamed with Genichiro Tenryu in a victory by countout against George Takano and Riki Choshu, in an event that sold out the Tokyo Dome with 53,000 people in attendance (the day after Mike Tyson vs. Buster Douglas drew 30,000 people). Despite the event's success, Misawa's match was never broadcast on television, since performers' contracts included exclusivity clauses to the television networks which broadcast their respective promotions' programming. On April 9, Misawa and Kenta Kobashi won the All Asia Tag Team Championship from the Can-Am Express, and four days later, Misawa wrestled Bret Hart to a time-limit draw at the WWF/NJPW/AJPW Supershow in the Dome.

Later that month, top star Genichiro Tenryu abruptly departed AJPW. He disagreed with Baba's creative direction, especially the booker's resistance to shootfighting influence on the All Japan product. Tenryu received a lucrative offer from Hachiro Tanaka, executive of eyewear company Megane Super, who had been interested in building his own wrestling promotion (and had almost signed Keiji Mutoh instead, but was blocked by Sakaguchi). This was initially under the auspices of becoming an ambassador for the brand, but the actual intentions of this deal were made clear months later by the formation of wrestling promotion Super World of Sports (and a resultant exodus of talent in its wake). Since this departure left Jumbo Tsuruta as the only native main event star that the promotion had, Baba made the decision to turn Misawa into his new rising star. During a tag match with Kawada against Yoshiaki Yatsu and Samson Fuyuki (both of whom would later join SWS) on May 14, Misawa commanded Kawada to unmask him, and thus abandoned the Tiger Mask gimmick. After winning the match, Misawa challenged his "childhood hero" Tsuruta to a singles match. After a successful defense of the All Asia Tag Team Championship against Davey Boy Smith and Johnny Smith, Misawa and Kobashi vacated the titles, foreshadowing Misawa's main-event push.

==== Feud with Jumbo Tsuruta and first Triple Crown victory (1990–1993) ====
The tour built up to the Misawa-Tsuruta match through a series of six-man tags in which Misawa and fellow young stars, later to be known under the faction name of the Super Generation Army (超世代軍, Chosedaigun), wrestled Tsuruta's stable. During the third of these matches, at Korakuen Hall on May 26, Tsuruta bullied Misawa's partners, Kobashi and Akira Taue, by knocking them off the apron unprovoked. However, when he tapped the active Misawa's shoulder minutes later, Misawa retaliated with an elbow strike that downed Tsuruta for several minutes. On June 8, Misawa would face Tsuruta for the main event at Budokan. Baba was convinced in consultation with wrestling journalist Tarzan Yamamoto that Misawa had to defeat Tsuruta by pinfall. According to a now-famous backstage story which has been recounted several times by Meltzer, Baba's decision to put Misawa over came during the event itself as, in the culmination of a trend that had been observed at house shows leading to this, Baba arrived at the venue to fans chanting "Misawa" outside, and noticed a significant boost in Misawa merchandise sales. Misawa defeated Tsuruta in a 24-minute match. This show had drawn about 500 people shy of a sellout, which was a rare attendance figure for All Japan. However, the momentum of Misawa's push led All Japan to sell out every event they held in Tokyo after this until early 1996. This victory also marked the beginning of a feud between the Super Generation Army, with Misawa, Kawada, Kobashi, and Tsuyoshi Kikuchi, and the Tsuruta-gun stable, a mix of veterans and younger talent. Akira Taue was initially among Misawa's allies, but he soon defected to Tsuruta-gun. On July 27, Misawa made his first challenge for the vacant Triple Crown Heavyweight Championship in July, losing to Stan Hansen. (Note: Hansen had actually dropped the championship to Terry Gordy ten days earlier in Kanazawa, which according to Hansen was his first clean loss in Japan to another gaijin. Gordy was originally set to face Hansen as champion, but after an overdose in a Roppongi nightclub Gordy had to vacate the titles.) Misawa lost to Tsuruta in a rematch on September 1, which determined the number one contender for the Triple Crown. Misawa teamed with Kawada to place third in the WSTDL, beating Tsuruta and Taue on the final day.

In a match against Taue on January 26, 1991, Misawa won by debuting the Tiger Driver '91, a variation of his Tiger Driver (sitout double underhook powerbomb) wherein he kept the double underhook applied while Taue was in midair to cause him to land on his head and shoulders. On February 26, Misawa and Kawada unsuccessfully challenged the team of Terry Gordy and Steve Williams, known as Satsujin Gyorai, for the World Tag Team championships in Sendai. During the match, Misawa was knocked out in kayfabe by a Gordy powerbomb to the arena floor, which left Kawada to fight the champions alone. Misawa then entered the 1991 Champion Carnival, held for the first time since 1982, and placed second in his block, with only one loss on April 6 to eventual second-place winner Stan Hansen. Misawa challenged Tsuruta for the Triple Crown on April 18, in the main event of a Budokan show that set an attendance record, but lost to him for the second consecutive time in singles competition. On June 9, Misawa pinned former Triple Crown champion Terry Gordy during a singles match in what was considered an upset, and when Misawa and Kawada faced Satsujin Gyorai on July 24 for a second tag title match, he pinned Gordy again. The pair made their first defense against Tsuruta and Taue on September 4 at Nippon Budokan, with Misawa historically forcing Jumbo to submit to a standing variation of the crossface to end the match. They vacated the belts for the 1991 WSTDL, which they entered. On a tournament match on November 21 against Kobashi and Kikuchi, Misawa's eye was swollen shut after an elbow strike from Kobashi. Misawa and Kawada reached the finals despite this, wherein they lost to Satsujin Gyorai in 25:24.

At a Budokan event on March 4, 1992, which drew a record attendance figure of 16,300 people, Misawa unsuccessfully challenged Triple Crown champion Hansen for the belts. In the 1992 Champion Carnival, which took place from March 20 to April 17, Misawa reached the finals for the first time. On the twelfth date of the tournament, April 2, he wrestled Tsuruta in what would be their final singles match, and the two went to a 30-minute time-limit draw. Reigning Triple Crown champion Stan Hansen, who had lost to Tsuruta in the previous Champion Carnival final, defeated Misawa for his first CC win. On June 5, Misawa and Kobashi challenged Tsuruta and Taue for the World tag titles, but Taue pinned Kobashi for a successful defense. Misawa injured his shoulder in July and missed a few small dates. However, Tsuruta was also absent from the tour, for what was initially reported as a knee injury, and then as a case of gout upon his return, but was actually more serious, and AJPW did not want to lose both of their biggest draws for a whole tour. As a result, Misawa was forced back into action before he was ready, and worked matches while wearing a sling. On August 22, 1992, Misawa defeated Hansen to win the first of what would eventually be five Triple Crown championships. In his first defense, on the final card of the October Giant Series tour, Misawa defeated Kawada at Budokan. He and Kawada would later win the 1992 WSTDL, defeating Taue and Jun Akiyama (who had only debuted that September) on December 4 and earning their second World Tag Team Championship as a result. They would again drop the belts to Satsujin Gyorai in their first defense on January 30 when Williams pinned Misawa. On February 28, however, Misawa successfully defended his Triple Crown title against Taue.

==== Feud with Toshiaki Kawada and teaming with Kenta Kobashi (1993–1995) ====
The Misawa-Kawada team would soon end. Jumbo Tsuruta's career, at least as a main-event wrestler, was over; he had abruptly left after completing the October Giant Series tour, and was diagnosed with hepatitis. Due to the void this left in the All Japan product, and Taue's specific need for a tag partner, Baba split Kawada from Misawa in the spring of 1993 to become his premier native rival in singles competition. In early March 1993, Kawada announced that he would no longer work as Misawa's tag partner after the advertised matches on the tour had been fulfilled. At the time he denied that he would join up with the remains of Jumbo's faction, who were being led by Akira Taue. However, Kawada and Taue ended their feud with a handshake after wrestling to a draw in the 1993 Champion Carnival, and shortly thereafter formed the Holy Demon Army (聖鬼軍, Seikigun). (Note: Although they had been close friends in high school, Misawa and Kawada's relationship had deteriorated over time, and Stan Hansen recalled they had multiple fights backstage and in public.) Kenta Kobashi would take Kawada's place as Misawa's tag partner.

Misawa entered the 1993 Champion Carnival and reached the finals to face Hansen again, who defeated him for his second Carnival victory on April 21 in Yokohama. Nevertheless, Misawa made a successful Triple Crown defense against Hansen on May 21 in Sapporo. (Note: The Shitennō title is closely associated with this specific event. As Kobashi stated in 2020, the moniker arose as a result of Misawa, Kobashi, Kawada, and Taue all having singles victories on May 21 against the "gaijin shitennō". In addition to Misawa's victory over Hansen, Kobashi defeated Gordy, Kawada defeated Williams, and Taue defeated Danny Spivey.) On May 20, the HDA won the World Tag Team championships from Satsujin Gyorai on May 20, ending their fifth and final reign. Misawa and Kobashi unsuccessfully challenged them for the championships on June 1. Misawa defended the Triple Crown three more times in 1993: against Kawada on July 29, Williams on September 3, and Hansen on October 23, during which Misawa broke his breastbone. Misawa and Kobashi entered the 1993 WSTDL, and defeated the Holy Demon Army in the finals. This marked Misawa's second victory at the annual tournament, and his first tag championship reign with Kobashi.

On February 15, 1994, Misawa was issued an invitation to participate in UWF International's (UWFi) summer tournament through a press conference, but this was ignored by the isolationist AJPW. On March 21, the third date of that year's Champion Carnival, Misawa faced Doug Furnas in a tournament match. He won via submission, but a Frankensteiner from Furnas was said to have badly injured his neck, and after trying to work a six-man tag two nights later sat out the rest of the tournament. This injury was later reported to have been a work; Misawa had been written out of the Carnival so that Kawada and Williams could be established as singles stars through the tournament. (Note: Misawa ultimately finished ninth in points, and Kawada defeated Williams in the Carnival final.) Upon his return, Misawa and Kobashi successfully defended the tag titles against the Holy Demon Army on May 21 in Sapporo. Two weeks later, on June 3, Misawa defeated Kawada at Budokan in Kawada's third challenge for the title, and the final successful defense of Misawa's first Triple Crown reign. This match was the second to receive a six-star rating from Dave Meltzer, and would be the last one to do so until 2017. It has been specifically cited as one of the greatest professional wrestling matches of all time, and even the "consensus Greatest Match of All Time" from the tape-trading era of American puroresu fandom. Although he and Kobashi successfully defended against Steve Williams and Johnny Ace on July 22, Misawa dropped the world championship to Williams six days later. At 705 days, Misawa's first reign is the longest in Triple Crown history.

Misawa and Kobashi vacated the World Tag Team belts for the 1994 WSTDL, which they won for the second consecutive year on December 10 against Williams and Ace in 25:05. Although they only defended the belts once, Misawa and Kobashi's first reign was the longest in the title's history for over a decade. On January 24, 1995, they successfully defended against the Holy Demon Army, working to a time limit draw. The story of this match had Kawada knock out Misawa with a punch to the chin at the 24-minute mark, which forced Kobashi to essentially work a handicap match for 25 minutes. However, Misawa recovered to make a successful comeback. Misawa and Kobashi then defeated Williams and Ace on March 3 at Budokan for their second and final successful defense. (Note: This was Williams' last AJPW match of 1995, as he was suspended for one year when he was found with marijuana at Narita International Airport on March 20.) The next month, Misawa participated in the penultimate match of the Weekly Pro Wrestling Tokyo Dome Show, a six-man tag in which he, Kobashi, and Triple Crown champion Hansen wrestled to a thirty-minute time-limit draw against Kawada, Taue, and Ace.

Misawa entered the 1995 Champion Carnival. Despite reportedly suffering a broken orbital bone after a Kawada kick during a match on April 6 which ended in a time-limit draw, Misawa did not miss any shows. He proceeded to the finals with seven wins and three draws, and won the Carnival against Taue on April 15. On May 26, he won his second Triple Crown championship against Stan Hansen in Sapporo, ending his then-record fourth (and final) Triple Crown reign. Misawa and Kobashi lost the tag titles in the Tokyo Sports match of the year on June 9, when the Holy Demon Army defeated them at Budokan. What made this match particularly significant is that it was the first time Kawada got a pinfall over Misawa in their rivalry, as well as the first time Misawa himself had lost a pinfall to anyone since Williams had defeated him for the Triple Crown. However, this success would not repeat itself, as on July 24 at the sold-out Budokan, Kawada fell short against Misawa once again, in the first defense of this Triple Crown reign. On September 10, Misawa defended the title against Taue, but on October 15, Misawa and Kobashi failed to win the World Tag Team titles back from the Holy Demon Army, in another sixty-minute time limit draw in Nagoya. Misawa won his first Triple Crown defense against Kobashi ten days later, but the two again entered the 1995 WSTDL as a team, defeating the Holy Demon Army for Misawa's fourth consecutive win of the tournament. In a story similar to previous matches between the teams, Misawa sold a Kawada kick to the eye by lying outside the ring for ten minutes. Kobashi managed to get the pinfall himself, though, with a moonsault to Taue. This would be Misawa's final WSTDL win, and through this win he and Kobashi became the first tag team since Terry and Dory Funk Jr. to win the tournament three times. The tag titles, however, did not change hands, as they had not been vacated before the tournament by the Holy Demon Army.

==== Teaming with Jun Akiyama (1996–1998) ====
On March 2, Misawa defended the Triple Crown against Gary Albright, who had signed with AJPW in late 1995 after departing the UWFi. This was the main event that broke AJPW's Tokyo sellout streak, drawing only 14,000 people to Budokan. In April, Misawa participated in the Champion Carnival, and tied for third place. On May 24, at the Nakajima Sports Center in Sapporo, Misawa dropped the championship to Taue, who had won that year's Carnival. The next week, Misawa and new partner Jun Akiyama won the World Tag Team titles from the Holy Demon Army. They made two successful defenses—the first on June 8 against Williams and Ace (voted match of the year by the Wrestling Observer Newsletter), and the second on July 9 against the Holy Demon Army—before dropping the titles to Williams and Ace on September 5. Misawa and Akiyama entered the 1996 WSTDL, and were defeated in the final match by the Holy Demon Army when Kawada pinned Misawa in 31:37.

On January 20, 1997, Misawa defeated Kobashi in the Osaka Prefectural Gymnasium to win his third Triple Crown championship. He defeated Steve Williams in his first defense on March 1, which was the retirement match of referee Joe Higuchi. Misawa then entered the 1997 Champion Carnival. Unlike the previous two years, Misawa reached the finals, with nine wins, two losses to Kobashi and Williams, and one draw against Kawada. However, as he, Kobashi, and Kawada had achieved a three-way tie, a one-night round-robin tournament playoff between the three was held to determine the victor. After Misawa and Kobashi wrestled first to a time-limit draw, Kawada defeated Misawa in singles competition for the first time in their rivalry, pinning him in 6:09. On May 31, 1997, Misawa had a six-man tag with Kobashi and Kentaro Shiga against Williams, Richard Slinger and Lacrosse which was billed as Misawa and Kobashi's last match as tag partners. After they won, Kobashi thanked Misawa with a handshake. The next week, Misawa defeated Kawada again in a June 6 Triple Crown match. On a sold-out July 25 Budokan show, Misawa made a successful title defense against Taue. On August 26 in Sapporo, though, he and Akiyama lost a world tag title shot against Albright and Williams when Albright pinned Misawa with a dragon suplex. On September 6, Misawa defeated Akiyama in his first Triple Crown title match. In October, Misawa made two more successful defenses ten days apart. The first was against Williams on October 11 in Fukuoka, and the second was against Kobashi on October 21 at the Budokan, during AJPW's 25th anniversary event. The latter won the Match of the Year award from Tokyo Sports. Misawa and Akiyama entered the 1997 WSTDL, and reached the finals against the Holy Demon Army again, to lose at Budokan on December 5. AJPW announced the show had sold out, but it was reported as actually having drawn 800 seats below the Budokan's maximum capacity.

For his first defense of 1998, at the Osaka Prefectural Gymnasium on January 26, Misawa defeated Akiyama by debuting the Emerald Flowsion. One month later, he had his final successful defense of the reign against Johnny Ace at the sold-out Budokan. This February 28 event was the first in a Budokan sellout streak that would last until Misawa's departure from AJPW. Misawa entered the 1998 Champion Carnival, and proceeded to the finals with eight wins, three draws against Akiyama, Hansen, and Kawada, and one loss to Taue. This was despite various neck and back injuries, a broken finger, and a broken left kneecap, the latter of which was suffered during a match on April 6 against Ace. Despite this, and against a doctor's recommendation to perform surgery and take six weeks off, Misawa continued to work, and won the Champion Carnival for the second and final time in another match against Akiyama.

==== Final years (1998–2000) ====
In an effort to increase All Japan Pro Wrestling's visibility amidst unsatisfactory sales and television viewership numbers, Baba decided after years of refusal to book the Tokyo Dome for a belated AJPW 25th Anniversary show on May 1, despite the reservations of Misawa and Kobashi. Plans to use this as a "soft reset" for the company product, including an FMW-style exploding ring deathmatch with Atsushi Onita and a potential partnership with the WWF, were vetoed by Baba, who believed that "if [they] were to do this, it would have to be as service to [their] fans". For the main event of this show, Kawada received his second title shot against Misawa during this reign, which All Japan announced in a March 16 press conference would have no time limit. In a result that had been foreshadowed over the past year, through not only Kawada's tainted victory over him in the 1997 Champion Carnival finals, but the draws that they had wrestled to in both of their other meetings during the last two Carnivals, Misawa finally dropped the championship to Kawada. Misawa went into the match with two blown knees and a bad neck and back, and as he suffered a legitimate concussion during the match he could not remember the finish afterwards; Baba announced that Misawa would take a break to heal.

Misawa returned on August 22 to work the first main event of the Summer Action Series II tour, a six-man match with Akiyama and Satoru Asako against Kobashi, Ace, and Johnny Smith. He admitted that his knees were still a problem and that he only felt sixty percent healthy, but he considered his return necessary because the two tours without him had been the worst-performing in company history. Misawa and Akiyama officially disbanded their team on August 30 after defeating Kobashi and Takao Omori in the main event of a show in Hakata. While he had had creative influence before this, it was around September when Misawa took over the booker position almost entirely after he reportedly threatened to start his own promotion. However, Baba still booked the Triple Crown programs and finishes through the end of 1998. In October, he started wrestling tag matches with Yoshinari Ogawa. (Note: Baba had wanted Maunakea Mossman to become Misawa's new partner. However, Misawa felt Mossman was too inexperienced. His first choice was ex-UWFi wrestler Masahito Kakihara, but Baba vetoed this, and Ogawa was agreed upon as a compromise. Kakihara later wrestled alongside them as the third member of their faction, the Untouchables.) At the Budokan on October 31, Misawa faced Triple Crown champion Kobashi for the title, and won to start his fourth Triple Crown reign in 43:29. This match was rated Match of the Year by Tokyo Sports, Nippon Sports, and the Wrestling Observer Newsletter. Misawa and Ogawa participated in the 1998 WSTDL and placed fifth with a 3–3–1 record. On January 22, 1999, Misawa lost the Triple Crown to Kawada in his first defense, but Kawada vacated it the next day. Seven minutes into the match, he had delivered a spinning backfist to the back of Misawa's head with such force that he broke his right forearm and wrist. This is the reason for the "ganso bomb" spot in which Kawada, unable to lift Misawa all the way for a powerbomb, dropped him onto his neck.

The match involving Kawada and Misawa was the last match that Giant Baba would watch, having reportedly called it the best match he had ever seen. Nine days later, he died of liver failure from complications of colon cancer. Misawa had not been aware of the severity of his condition, which was only known by Baba's innermost circle: his wife Motoko, older sister, and daughter, as well as referee Kyohei Wada and secretary Ryu Nakata. Although Motoko Baba had selected Mitsuo Momota to succeed her late husband as president, board member Jumbo Tsuruta used his influence to help Misawa inherit the position, before Tsuruta himself was forced out of the company with no severance package. Momota, who would function as an intermediary between Misawa and Motoko, ran the office while Misawa was trained for the position. After Misawa and Ogawa unsuccessfully challenged Kobashi and Akiyama for the tag titles in the semi-main event at a March 6 Budokan show, Misawa placed third in the 1999 Champion Carnival. He then defeated Vader for the Triple Crown championship on May 2, in the main event of the Giant Baba Retirement Show (so named because AJPW did not want to consider it a memorial event) at the Tokyo Dome. On May 7, a press conference was held to announce that Misawa was the new AJPW president. One month later, on June 11, Misawa successfully defended against Kobashi at Budokan. For the second consecutive year, Misawa and Kobashi won the Wrestling Observer Newsletter Match of the Year award. However, Kobashi suffered a broken nose, and Misawa was so fatigued that, for the first time, reporters were not allowed to see him. Misawa successfully defended against Kawada on July 23, defeating him with the Tiger Driver '91. Misawa and Ogawa won both the All Asia and World Tag Team Championships from No Fear on August 25. They vacated the All Asia belts soon afterward, as the match was done to break up the monopoly No Fear had achieved in the company's tag division. Misawa arranged a tournament for the All Asia titles from October 9–25, in which he and Ogawa did not participate. Misawa and Ogawa lost the World Tag Team titles to Akiyama and Kobashi on October 23 in Nagoya when Kobashi pinned Misawa after a Burning Hammer. Then, Misawa's fifth Triple Crown reign ended at Budokan on October 30, when he was defeated by Vader. In the 1999 WSTDL, Misawa and Ogawa scored nine points (4-1-2), achieving third place in a three-way tie.

In a Budokan show on February 27, 2000, Misawa was pinned by Akiyama for the first time in singles competition during the semi main-event. Misawa then entered the 2000 Champion Carnival, which he changed from round-robin format to a single-elimination tournament for the first time since 1974. Reigning Triple Crown champion Kobashi defeated him in the semifinal, and went on to win his first Champion Carnival after ten consecutive appearances.

==== Exodus (2000) ====
While Misawa became company president in 1999, and had been head booker for several months before that, Shohei Baba's widow Motoko held eighty-five percent of AJPW's shares with Nippon TV holding the other fifteen. There were reports of a "quiet" power struggle between Misawa and Motoko in March 1999, and Tsuruta confirmed this when he left Japan for Portland, Oregon. In fact, the two had had professional tensions long beforehand. Motoko had opposed the decision to push Misawa in the wake of Genichiro Tenryu's departure in 1990. The two began conflicting as early as 1996. In the year before Shohei Baba's death, Misawa even asked him on behalf of the locker room to have his wife leave the company. He was somewhat successful in that she ceased to have any creative influence when Misawa began booking. (Note: Motoko's poor reputation amongst wrestlers, for which she was known as the "Dragon Lady" of Japanese wrestling, was a direct result of the method by which she and her husband operated AJPW. They were said to have a "good cop/bad cop" dynamic, wherein all unfavorable news was delegated to Motoko to deliver in order to keep Shohei's image clean. Gaijin generally had better relations with her, however.) Misawa attempted to keep her content by maintaining the same salary that she had been paid when her husband was alive (approximately $500,000), but since she was the majority shareholder this did not change the power dynamic. Misawa's wish to change the AJPW product, and to modernize its presentation, to address their box office troubles ran in direct opposition to Baba's intent to maintain her late husband's booking philosophy. Misawa was particularly intent on pushing the company's younger talent. In September 1999 he and Baba had a major fight over his decision to have Akiyama and Takao Omori headline a Budokan show (which sold out), although this match's placement had been decided by a fan ballot. Motoko's conservatism was partially due to her belief that the company, and Japanese wrestling as a whole, had fallen from its peak. Misawa was also angry with Motoko over fiscal matters, as he had discovered that much of the company's merchandise sales did not produce funds for AJPW, but for a subsidiary that she had set up. At some point, Misawa approached Nippon TV with his plans to leave AJPW to start a new promotion, and told them that nearly everyone in the locker room would follow him. NTV officials sided with Misawa in this dispute, but told him that they needed to keep their agreement quiet for one year after the meeting. Due to the proximity of Baba's death, the station wanted to wait until enough time had passed to drop All Japan's television program, which had been associated closely with NTV since its formation. Nevertheless, rumors that NTV had taken Misawa's side in his dispute against Baba saw print in February 2000, and Weekly Fight Magazine reported that AJPW would split itself into two groups in May, though Misawa declined to comment on this.

Adding to the situation was that, as of the end of the fiscal year on March 31, 2000, all the promotion's talent were working as free agents, since Misawa was not authorized to give the raises he intended to award all native workers. Misawa had also wanted to modernize their contracts, providing wrestlers with full medical coverage, full injury pay, and possibly stock options (which NJPW's contracts offered). As the result of these disagreements, the AJPW executive board voted to remove Misawa from the presidential position on May 28. All parties agreed to keep this news private until the end of the current tour, and Misawa attempted to persuade Baba to give him her public blessings to start a new company, so as to smooth the public transition and preserve the legacies of Giant Baba and the recently deceased Tsuruta. (Note: Tsuruta returned to Japan in late 1999 when his kidney cancer worsened and spread to his liver. He underwent a kidney transplant in Manila, but died after the procedure of internal bleeding on May 13. After this, Misawa supported the Japan Transplant Support Association in various activities throughout the 2000s, and in the aftermath of his own death, the association received dozens of inquiries from fans interested in donor cards. On June 18, 2009, which would have been Misawa's 47th birthday, the House of Representatives passed an amendment to the Organ Transplant Act which removed donor age restrictions.) Baba refused this proposal or relinquishment of any of her majority share, and so Tokyo Sports broke the news on June 12. At an emergency board meeting held in response on June 13, co-vice president Mitsuo Momota and fellow boardsmen Kobashi, Taue, Kenichi Oyagi, and Yoshihiro Momota collectively resigned from their positions.

On June 16, Misawa led a press conference, in which he was accompanied by all of AJPW's native wrestlers except Kawada and Fuchi. He announced that after finishing their last commitments to AJPW in July, all 23 who accompanied him to the conference would depart with Misawa to form a new promotion in August. The next day, Misawa announced the name of the new promotion: Pro Wrestling Noah. On June 20, Misawa met with Nippon TV officials, who had cancelled All Japan's television program, and secured a time slot for Noah programming. On July 20, he wrestled his last AJPW match for several years, in which he and Ogawa won against Taue and Masao Inoue.

=== Pro Wrestling Noah (2000–2009) ===
==== First years (2000–2002) ====
Pro Wrestling Noah debuted with two events, collectively called Departure, on August 5 and 6 at Differ Ariake. (Note: Differ Ariake, which had also been the location of Misawa's June 16 press conference, became closely associated with Noah, and they would set up their offices and dojo there.) While they sold out in minutes, the events themselves were not profitable. The low ticket prices attracted scalpers, who resold $60 ringside seats for $2700. Noah also spent more than the live gate of the first show to place a screen in the parking lot for the 1,300 people watching outside the venue. In the first show's main event, Misawa and Taue lost to Kobashi and Akiyama in a two-out-of-three-falls tag match, and in the second, Misawa and Ogawa defeated Kentaro Shiga and Daisuke Ikeda. The company would struggle to grow from here, because legal threats against NTV from Motoko Baba kept Noah off television until April 2001. Misawa had not expected as much of AJPW's talent to join him in the exodus as they had, and financial difficulties caused Misawa to cancel his insurance and borrow money from his home to fund their salaries. However, Noah sold out their biggest show to date, December 23's Great Voyage at Ariake Coliseum, well in advance. In his first major singles match for his own promotion, Misawa defeated Vader in the semi-main event.

Another problem for Noah arose on January 18, 2001, when, during a tag match with Taue against Misawa and Naomichi Marufuji, Kobashi severely injured his right knee. Kobashi's knees had been in poor condition as early as 1991, due to his use of the moonsault and general overachieving nature in the ring. While he intended to have double knee surgery performed at the end of his tenure in AJPW, he did not go through with it when Departure was scheduled for August, and he continued to work Noah's events thereafter. Kobashi had surgery on January 25 to transfer cartilage from his elbow to his knee. While it was initially reported that he would be able to return in July, this was much too optimistic as Kobashi would have several more procedures throughout the year.

In early 2001, Misawa had his only two matches against Shinya Hashimoto, who had worked on the Great Voyage card. In the first, on January 13, Misawa and Ogawa defeated Hashimoto and Alexander Otsuka at the Osaka Prefectural Gymnasium when Misawa pinned Otsuka after a tiger driver. In the second, the main-event of the inaugural show of Hashimoto-cofounded promotion Pro Wrestling Zero1, March 2's Truth Century Creation, Misawa and Akiyama defeated Hashimoto and Yuji Nagata in the sold-out Ryōgoku Kokugikan. From March 18 through April 15, Noah held the Navigation for the Victory GHC tour, which featured a sixteen-man, single-elimination tournament held to determine the inaugural GHC Heavyweight champion. At the first stop of the tour in Differ Ariake, Misawa defeated Akitoshi Saito in the first round, and proceeded to the finals after victories over Ogawa in Okayama on April 4, and Akiyama in Hiroshima on April 11. For Noah's first television taping, at the Kokusai International Center on April 1 (aired April 6), Misawa and Ogawa won against Marufuji and Takeshi Rikio. On April 15, before a reported crowd of 12,000 people in the Ariake Coliseum, Misawa defeated Yoshihiro Takayama to become the first GHC Heavyweight champion. During this match, Misawa began bleeding from his mouth after a high kick from Takayama legitimately knocked his jaw out of alignment, and also ended the match with a five-centimeter cut which required six stitches. After a successful defense against Taue on May 18 in Sapporo, Misawa lost the championship to Akiyama on July 28, in a sold-out Budokan event for the promotion's one-year anniversary. In October, Misawa and Ogawa participated in the Navigation Tug of War tournament to determine the first GHC Tag Team champions, but were eliminated in the semi-finals by Akiyama and Saito. Misawa and Ogawa became the second team to hold the belts when they defeated Scorpio and Vader on November 30 in Sapporo, but this reign only lasted nine days before they dropped the belts to No Fear in the sold-out Ariake Coliseum.

On February 17, 2002, at Nippon Budokan, Misawa teamed with the returning Kobashi for a match against Akiyama and Yuji Nagata which Akiyama pinned Kobashi to win. It appeared that Kobashi was going to resume full-time work for Noah in their next tour, and this was greatly anticipated, as the return show had sold out over a month in advance. However, Kobashi further damaged ligaments in his left knee during the match. Kobashi was advised to take the next six months off, or have major surgery that would prevent him from wrestling for another year. While he initially intended to ignore medical opinion, Misawa cancelled his appearances. This essentially forbade Kobashi from returning before he was ready, despite the increased business that this would have brought Noah. On May 5, Misawa wrestled his first match for New Japan Pro-Wrestling since 1990, in which he faced Masahiro Chono for the Toukon Memorial Day event in the Tokyo Dome. The two wrestled to a thirty-minute time-limit draw, as has been Noah's insistence, particularly from Ryu Nakata, in order to bolster the nascent company's credibility. On September 23, 2002, Misawa defeated GHC Heavyweight champion Takayama to begin his second reign. Takayama was at the peak of his stardom, due to his fight against Don Frye at Pride 21, and according to Meltzer in his 2009 Misawa obituary, this was when Noah "really started taking off". The match was noted for its brutality, and it caused Takayama to suffer a dislocated AC joint, torn shoulder ligaments, and a broken eye socket bone (the latter was the same injury he received during the Frye bout). Misawa made his only successful defense on December 7, defeating Ogawa.

==== The peak of Noah (2003–2005) ====
At Great Voyage 2003, the first event of the year (at the sold-out Budokan), Misawa and Chono were defeated in the semi-main event by Kobashi and Taue when Kobashi pinned Misawa. On March 1, 2003, in the sold-out Budokan, Kobashi used the Burning Hammer to defeat Misawa for the GHC Heavyweight Championship, in their first Noah singles meeting. Like Kawada's Tokyo Dome win over Misawa in 1998, this was the culmination of years of failure on Kobashi's end to overcome Misawa in title matches. The resultant match received significant critical acclaim. As they had done in 1999, Misawa and Kobashi won Match of the Year awards from Tokyo Sports and the Wrestling Observer Newsletter. Meltzer wrote in 2015 that the Misawa/Kobashi rivalry "peaked" with this match. Misawa said afterwards that this would be their final singles match, and with the exception of the opening match of Noah's 2004 Christmas Eve show (a ten-minute time-limit draw), this would be honored.

At Great Voyage 2004 on January 10, in the sold-out Budokan, Misawa and Ogawa began their second GHC Tag Team Championship reign when they defeated NJPW stars Yuji Nagata and Hiroshi Tanahashi. Alongside Naomichi Marufuji and Kenta Kobayashi winning the GHC Junior Heavyweight Tag Team championships from El Samurai and Wataru Inoue in the semi-main event, this was a victory for Noah as they had lost their last four interpromotional matches with NJPW talent. This also made Misawa and Ogawa the first two-time GHC Tag Team champions, and this reign would last far longer than their first. After successful defenses on March 6 against Ikeda and Muhammad Yone, and on April 25 against Kobayashi and Marufuji, Misawa and Ogawa appeared for American independent promotion Pro Wrestling IRON, defending the belts against Nigel McGuinness and Bart Blaxson on June 11 in San Leandro, California.

Misawa and Ogawa's next defense was Noah's first interpromotional match with AJPW wrestlers since the mass exodus. On July 10, Noah held their first Tokyo Dome show, Departure, and in the penultimate match, they defended against AJPW president Keiji Mutoh and Taiyo Kea, one of the few AJPW wrestlers who had not joined the Noah exodus. (Note: Mutoh had wanted to work with him since the early 1990s, and had even suggested during his 1995 IWGP Heavyweight Championship reign that Misawa challenge and defeat him for the title in an interpromotional match. In the autumn of 2001, Misawa and Mutoh reportedly held secret meetings towards a potential dream match in 2002. However, this never happened, as in 2002 Mutoh defected completely to AJPW.) Eight days later, Misawa had his first AJPW match since July 2000, where he defeated Satoshi Kojima in the semi-main event of Battle Banquet. On September 10, Misawa and Ogawa defended against Saito and Inoue, and on October 24, they defended against Taue and Takuma Sano. Misawa returned to AJPW on October 31 for the Keiji Mutoh: Love and Bump pay-per-view, where he and Mutoh defeated Hiroshi Hase and Kensuke Sasaki in what was billed as a "Special Dream Tag Match". After another successful GHC Tag Team defense against Donovan Morgan and Michael Modest on December 4 in Yokohama, Misawa and Ogawa lost the titles to Doug Williams and Scorpio on January 23, 2005, when Scorpio pinned Ogawa.

Misawa made several interpromotional appearances in the first half of 2005, including a UK tour. On March 18, he and Ogawa defeated Doug Williams and Stevie Knight in a British Championship Wrestling event. The next day, at The Wrestling Channel's International Showdown supercard, Misawa, Ogawa, and Kotaro Suzuki were defeated by Williams, Scorpio, and James Tighe. On March 20, Misawa and Suzuki appeared for German promotion Westside Xtreme Wrestling, losing to Ares and Ahmed Chaer. At a Budokan show on April 24 which drew 15,800 people, Misawa and Suzuki lost to Marufuji and Minoru Suzuki. During this event, Kawada made his first appearance for Noah after the third match. He then challenged Misawa to a match on Noah's July 18 Tokyo Dome show. In his final interpromotional appearance of the year, Misawa and Tatsumi Fujinami defeated Masahiro Chono and Jushin Liger at NJPW Nexess VI on May 14. At July 18's Destiny, the promotion's second Tokyo Dome event, he faced Kawada for the first time since the exodus in the main event, which he won. Noah claimed a sellout crowd of 62,000 people attended the event, but a later earnings report recorded that the company lost 10 million yen on the show. Destiny was Noah's final Tokyo Dome event. Misawa unsuccessfully challenged Rikio for the GHC Heavyweight Championship in the sold-out Budokan on September 18, and on Noah's final Budokan show of the year on November 5, which sold out, he defeated Genichiro Tenryu.

==== Noah's decline (2006–2009) ====
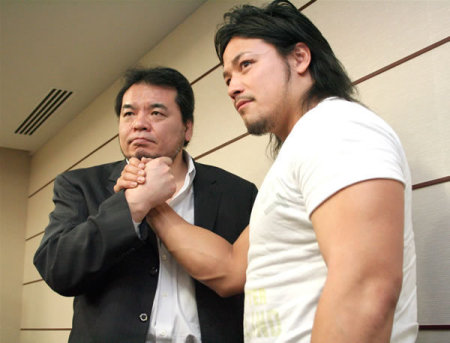
Misawa with Go Shiozaki (right) in May 2009 after announcing they would challenge for the GHC Tag Team Championship

On the undercard of Noah's April 23, 2006, Budokan show, Misawa and Ogawa defeated Minoru Suzuki and Takahiro Suwa. Noah announced an attendance of 14,200 people, but the real number was reportedly under 10,000. In July, Misawa announced that Kobashi would be out indefinitely to treat kidney cancer, which had been diagnosed through tests run during his annual physical. Noah's next Budokan show on July 16 was set to have Kobashi and Takayama face Misawa and Akiyama in the main event. This was Takayama's first match in two years, as he had suffered a stroke after a 2004 NJPW G1 Climax match against Kensuke Sasaki. Misawa arranged Sasaki himself as a replacement for Kobashi, and the resultant event was a sellout. After this, though, Budokan show attendance declined throughout the year, as Misawa gave junior heavyweight Marufuji a GHC Heavyweight Championship run (which he won from Akiyama in September). When Misawa decided to break tradition further, and hold a Budokan show on October 29 wherein Marufuji defended the title against fellow junior Kobayashi, only 5,000 people of the 11,500 reportedly in attendance paid to see the event. Adding to the situation was that Noah depended on events that they sold to local promoters, who most often were older, wealthy men who did not follow the product closely and bought a Noah show to see Misawa and Kobashi. Misawa had planned to retire in 2007, but he was the only consistent top draw that Noah had. Misawa decided to put the world title on himself for Noah's survival, because he felt pressured to appear on every show at least until Kobashi returned. He defeated Marufuji at Great Voyage at the Budokan on December 10 to win his third GHC Heavyweight Championship. (Note: This show had an overflow crowd of 16,800 people, but this has been credited to Kobashi, who had announced after successful chemotherapy that he would attend to make an announcement.)

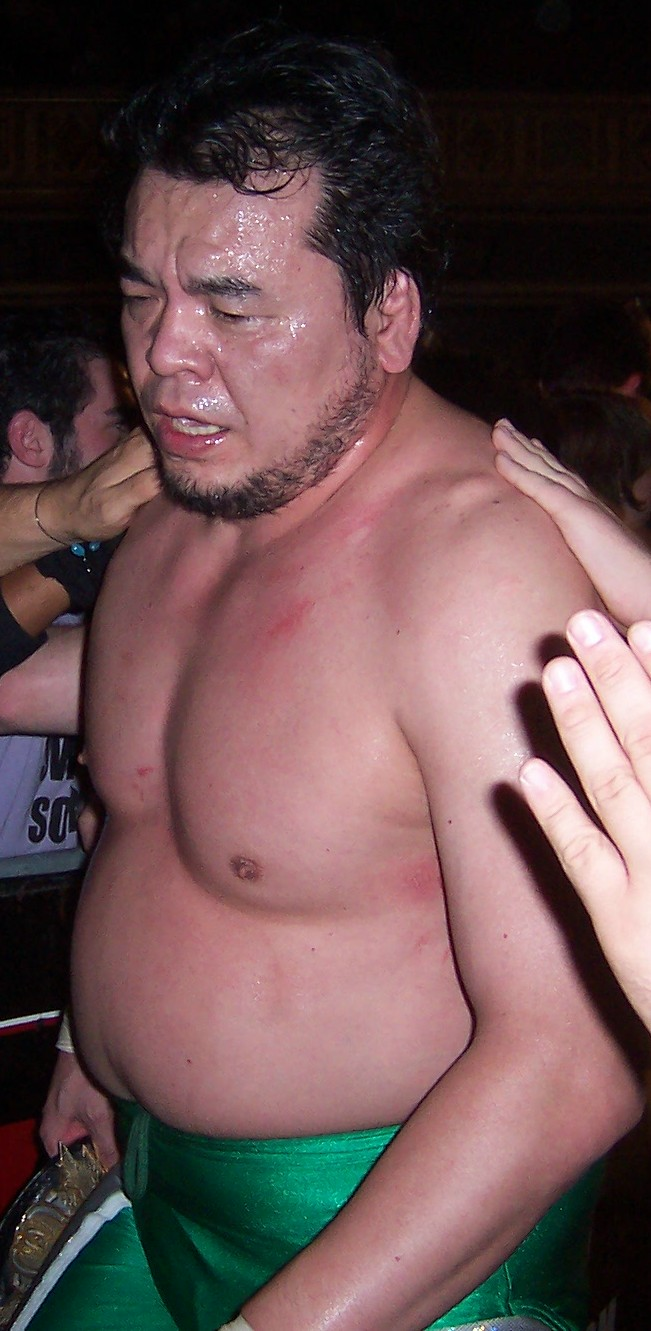
Misawa after defeating KENTA at Ring of Honor (ROH)'s Glory By Honor VI Night 2 on November 3, 2007

Misawa held the GHC Heavyweight Championship for 448 days, his longest championship reign since his fourth Triple Crown reign, and made seven successful defenses throughout 2007. The first of these was on January 12, when he defeated Takeshi Morishima. On April 28, he defended against Takuma Sano. Bison Smith challenged Misawa on June 3, and Taue challenged on July 15. In late August, it was announced that Misawa would be on the November 2 and 3 Ring of Honor (ROH) Glory By Honor cards in Philadelphia and New York City respectively. On September 29, Misawa defeated Marufuji in a rematch for the GHC title, and on October 27, Misawa successfully defended against Samoa Joe in a Budokan show with 14,000 people in attendance. The following week, Misawa traveled to the United States for the ROH appearances. On the first night, he teamed with Kenta Kobayashi to face Morishima and Marufuji, wrestling to a thirty-minute time-limit draw. The following night, he defended against Kobayashi. Despite having reportedly contracted flu, this match was considered by some to have been Misawa's best in years, and Meltzer stated in 2009 that it was Misawa's final singles match "in the **** [four-star] range". On December 2, Misawa and Akiyama wrestled Kobashi and Takayama, in Kobashi's return match. This match, which was held before a Budokan sellout crowd of 17,000 people (reportedly the venue's all-time attendance record), and which Misawa won with an Emerald Flowsion to Kobashi off the middle rope, was awarded Match of the Year by Nikkan Sports and Tokyo Sports. Misawa himself was awarded Wrestler of the Year by Tokyo Sports, and received the Nikkan Sports MVP award as determined by fan voting. (Note: Misawa would posthumously win the 2009 Nikkan Sports MVP award as well.)

On March 2, 2008, Misawa was defeated by Morishima for the GHC Heavyweight Championship. After this, Misawa still felt obligated to work every Noah event; while Kobashi had returned, by this time the company was struggling too much to handle losing Misawa on their cards. His injuries were accumulating, including osteophytes on his neck which caused pain during simple tasks, such as brushing his teeth and touching the collar of his gown, and a visual impairment in his right eye which was discovered in 2007. Misawa had also long been a chain smoker. Misawa mostly worked mid-card tag matches where his partners did much of the work, which was how Giant Baba had remained an active wrestler until the last two months of his life. Misawa and Ogawa entered Noah's first Global Tag League, held from March 29 to April 27, and reached the finals, where they were defeated by Saito and Smith at Budokan. In June, Noah went on a brief European tour. On June 21, Misawa and Marufuji defeated Kobashi and Go Shiozaki in Coventry; after this, NOAH split to work shows in Farringdon and Oberhausen, the latter for Westside Xtreme Wrestling. Misawa worked the former show, where he and Kotaro Suzuki defeated Smith & Mark Haskins. While these events were relatively successful, Noah had their lowest crowd to date for a July 18 Budokan show, with only 6,000 people attending the event. In September, Nippon TV affiliate Yomiuri TV cancelled their Noah broadcasts. As the Kansai region had historically been a hotbed for Baba, this was seen as indicative of the end of an era. Around this time, Noah announced that they would no longer take their entire roster on tours in order to cut travel costs. On December 17, Nippon TV announced that they would be cutting Noah's television program in March to compensate for advertising losses in the wake of the Great Recession. This marked the end of a 55-year period of wrestling programming on the station, going back to the JWA. The program, which had been airing in a thirty-minute Sunday slot floating between 1:30 and 3 AM, was still Noah's best means of mainstream exposure.

Misawa appeared at NJPW's Wrestle Kingdom III on January 4, 2009, losing alongside Takashi Sugiura to Shinsuke Nakamura and Hirooki Goto. On March 1, Noah held their final NTV taping at Budokan, with a near-sellout of 14,200 people in attendance. This show was also significant for Kobashi's return after a September elbow surgery. Noah announced television deals with satellite stations Nittele G+ and Fighting TV Samurai. However, there was a low percentage of Japanese homes with satellite television. This meant that the most television exposure Noah would have going forward was a half-hour timeslot after midnight on TV Osaka (a smaller affiliate of TV Tokyo). (Note: Another disadvantage of satellite television, according to one source, was that it charged as much as 200 million yen on an annual basis, while cable TV rights ran at no cost to Noah.)

Misawa decided to set up Shiozaki as Noah's new ace as opposed to Morishima, whose championship reign had seen business decline, and whose weight had become a concern. He did this by giving him several big wins before an unsuccessful title match against Akiyama on April 16. In order for Shiozaki to rebound and gain credibility, Misawa formed a tag team with him, and they entered the second Global Tag League, which took place from April 11 to May 6. They reached the finals with nine points (4-2-1), and defeated Morishima and Sasaki to win. This final match was held at Budokan, and was Misawa's sixty-ninth main event at the venue. It would be his final date there, and as the first Noah Budokan show since losing NTV coverage, only 7,300 people attended. The backing of local promoters in rural areas was more important than ever, and these promoters wanted Noah's biggest stars to wrestle even if they weren't in the physical condition to do so. Four days before his death, Misawa admitted to a Tokyo Sports reporter that he wanted to retire, and that "he couldn't do this until he was 48". Despite this, he said that he was not going to take a break, because he needed to put Shiozaki over and "if he rested just once, he would be unable to return". According to Ryu Nakata in an interview given shortly after Misawa's death, Misawa had told his wife that day that he planned to retire by the end of the year and work in another unspecified field, (Note: Misawa was teaching a business course at Teikyo Heisei University at the time of his death.) and had told Nakata that he did not wish to work a farewell tour.

== Personal life ==
Misawa married actress Mayumi Shiina on May 10, 1988. They had two children, a daughter named Kaede and a son named Shizuma, who were reported to have been 20 and 17 years of age, respectively, at the time of his death. After his death, Mayumi became a majority shareholder in Noah. Misawa was very private about his life outside of wrestling, to the point that wrestlers who had known him for decades were unaware that he had children. He was also said to have been an avid gamer, and at one point revealed to video game magazine Famitsu a list of his favorite video games. Misawa said that the green attire and boots he wore were influenced by Horst Hoffman.

== Death ==
On June 13, 2009, Misawa teamed with Shiozaki against GHC Tag Team Champions Saito and Smith in a title match at Hiroshima Green Arena. The match was supposed to last 37 minutes, but around ten minutes before the scheduled finish, Misawa took a back suplex from Saito. Misawa was motionless, and referee Shuichi Nishinaga stopped the match. A doctor in attendance attempted to perform CPR, but was unsuccessful, and Misawa's body discolored as emergency medical technicians attempted to revive him with an automated external defibrillator. Misawa was taken to the Hiroshima University hospital, where he was pronounced dead at 10:10 pm JST, at age 46. Although Misawa's family invoked a Japanese law that requested the police not publicly release the official cause of death, it was speculated in the official police report to have been a cervical injury, and the Hiroshima Prefectural Police Central Office stated the night after the accident that the "diagnosis was cervical cord transection". The injury was specified and reported by Meltzer as a cervical fracture, which separated Misawa's first and second cervical vertebrae, known as atlanto-axial dislocation.

=== Aftermath ===
Misawa's death was the leading story amongst the Japanese sports press. Nikkan Sports and Tokyo Sports printed special memorial issues on June 22, and Weekly Pro Wrestling printed photographs of the maneuver which killed Misawa. However, highbrow newspapers and mainstream sources gave the event little coverage (NHK only devoted one minute to the story on their primetime newscast), since older editors did not consider wrestling major news due to its great decline in overall popularity. An exception to this trend was NTV broadcaster Kazuo Tokumitsu, who devoted twenty minutes of his morning program to Misawa. Tokumitsu, a figure of great influence in NTV who once worked as AJPW's head announcer, had reportedly opposed the network cancellation. Wrestling promotions across the world opened their shows with ceremonial ten counts in tribute, and WWE and Total Nonstop Action Wrestling (TNA) both posted memorial messages on their respective websites. WWE wrestler CM Punk wrote 'MISAWA' on his wrist and forearm tape as tribute during the June 15 episode of WWE Raw. Also, Yoshi Tatsu wore a ring attire resembling Misawa's for some weeks as a tribute.

At a tour bus meeting after Misawa was taken to the hospital, Noah wrestlers were informed that he had died, but that the company could not afford to cancel the tour's remaining dates. The next day, they proceeded with a Fukuoka show. Vice President Momota did not reveal Misawa's cause of death, as was requested by his family (this was before the Hiroshima police released their report), and Akiyama, who was set to defend the title that night against Rikio, vacated the championship. Akiyama had continued to work despite significant pain, and had been in too much pain the night before to go to ringside when attempts were made to revive Misawa. Misawa's death spurred him to seek examination, and a hernia was found between his L4 and L5 vertebrae. For the replacement main event, Shiozaki defeated Rikio by pinfall to win the vacated championship. Saito and his family were harassed for his role in Misawa's death, although the deceased's family did not hold him responsible for the incident, and Noah officials called to stop the harassment. Saito later admitted to suicidal ideation during this period.

A private funeral was held on June 18, with around 100 people in attendance. While much of the Noah roster could not attend due to a Nagoya show, many wrestlers still attended the ceremony, including Kawada, and Motoko Baba was also present. Kobashi, Taue, Ogawa, Shiozaki, Marufuji, Asako, Kotaro Suzuki, and Ippei Ota were the pallbearers. On July 4 at Differ Ariake, Noah held a public ceremony at which Tokumitsu spoke. Despite the 27 °C (80.6 °F) temperature, this event, for which they had anticipated an attendance of 5,000 people, attracted a line of 26,000 people which stretched for 2.4 kilometers. Meltzer reported that this was the second most-attended public funeral for a Japanese athlete (only surpassed by the April 17, 1999, ceremony for Giant Baba at Budokan, attended by 28,000 people), and possibly (at the time) the fourth-most attended public funeral for an athlete in history. (Note: The only other athletes' public funerals at the time that Meltzer knew exceeded Misawa's and Baba's in attendance were those for Montreal Canadiens hockey players Maurice Richard and Howie Morenz.)

At a stockholders' meeting held the next day, Taue was named Noah president, and Kobashi and Marufuji were promoted to vice presidents. While Misawa had intended to groom Marufuji to eventually take his place, he arranged for Taue to succeed him in the event that he was unavailable. The power struggle in the wake of his death caused demoted Vice President Mitsuo Momota, who had co-founded AJPW alongside his brother Yoshihiro and Giant Baba when they left the JWA and had gone with Misawa during the Noah exodus, to quit. Momota himself had said that he believed the company's biggest star should be the president, and had pushed for Kobashi to become a vice president. However, he did not expect to lose his own position in the process, and demotion to counselor after Taue's promotion left Momota with no political power. Kobashi and Akiyama attempted to dissuade him, but Momota tendered his resignation to Taue on July 7. Momota's role was taken over by Haruka Eigen, and a power struggle for control of the company between Kobashi, who felt that the company should remain loyal to its talent, and Ryu Nakata, who believed cuts were necessary in Noah's financial state, ended in Nakata's favor. Eigen and Nakata were implicated in the yakuza-related "black money" scandal whose fallout would affect Noah in 2012.

Misawa's death caused several wrestling promotions to work toward a stronger approach to regulating professional wrestling in the country. On what would have been his 47th birthday, June 18, Hiroshi Hase organized a meeting towards this end with the heads of NJPW (Naoki Sugabayashi), AJPW (Keiji Mutoh), and Noah (business head Ryu Nakata) in attendance, as well as Yoshirō Mori, Kenshiro Matsunami, and Shinobu Kandori. While the unified regulating body favored by Mutoh did not come to exist, these talks did have some positive effects.

== See also ==
- List of premature professional wrestling deaths

== Bibliography ==
- Charlton, Chris (July 17, 2018). EGGSHELLS: Pro Wrestling in the Tokyo Dome (Kindle ed.). ISBN 9784990865856.
- Charlton, Chris (October 23, 2015). Lion's Pride: The Turbulent History of New Japan Pro Wrestling (Kindle ed.). Christopher Charlton. ISBN 978-4990865818.
- Hasegawa, Shoichi (June 2015). Misawa Mitsuharu from June 13, 2009 (in Japanese). Shufunotomosha. ISBN 9784074129102.
- Misawa, Mitsuharu (2000). Misawa Mitsuharu Autobiography (in Japanese). Kobunsha. ISBN 4334972756.
- Misawa, Mitsuharu (December 2004). Idealist (in Japanese). Neko Publishing. ISBN 4777050475.
- Nakata, Ryu; Honda, Makoto (2007). Mitsuharu Misawa: The Man who Made Noah (in Japanese). BASEBALL MAGAZINE SHA Co., Ltd. ISBN 978-4583100401.
- Tokumitsu, Masayuki (2010). Densetsu Ni Natta Otoko: Misawa Mitsuharu To Iu Hito (in Japanese). Gentosha. ISBN 978-4344018402.
