= Footloose (professional wrestling) =

Professional wrestling tag team

Tag team
- Members: Toshiaki Kawada; Ricky/Samson Fuyuki
- Name(s): Footloose; Toshiaki Kawada and Samson Fuyuki; Japanese Force
- Billed heights: Kawada: 6 ft 0 in (1.83 m); Fuyuki: 6 ft 0 in (1.83 m)
- Combined billed weight: 490 lb (220 kg)
- Debut: 1985
- Disbanded: 1990

Footloose was a professional wrestling tag team consisting of Toshiaki Kawada and Ricky/Samson Fuyuki.

== History ==
=== Japanese Force (1985) ===
Toshiaki Kawada and Samson Fuyuki started teaming up in 1985, while on an excursion in the United States, wrestling for Texas All-Star Wrestling. Kawada and Fuyuki, who by then went under the name Ricky Fuyuki, went under the team name Japanese Force and they feuded with American Force (Paul Diamond and Shawn Michaels). They were managed by Gary Hart.

=== All-Japan Pro Wrestling (1987–1990) ===
In 1987, Kawada and Fuyuki (now going by the name Samson Fuyuki) reunited in All Japan Pro Wrestling, where they each joined Genichiro Tenryu's Revolution stable.

In January 1988, Kawada and Fuyuki began wearing matching ring attire and named their team Footloose. On March 9, 1988, Footloose won the All Asia Tag Team Championship, defeating Mighty Inoue and Takashi Ishikawa. They held the titles for exactly six months before losing the belts to Shinichi Nakano and Shunji Takano on September 9, 1988. However, Footloose rebounded by defeating Nakano and Takano to reclaim the titles six days later, on September 15, 1988.

After the feud with Nakano and Takano died down, Footloose went into a heated rivalry with the Can-Am Express. On June 5, 1989, the Express defeated them for the All Asia Tag Team Championship. Four months later, on October 20, 1989, Footloose defeated the Express to win back the titles for the third time. Their third reign would be their last, before losing the titles back to the Express on March 2, 1990.

Soon after the title loss in April 1990, Footloose disbanded, as Kawada would form a team with friend Tiger Mask II, who would later unmask, revealing himself as Mitsuharu Misawa. Fuyuki followed Tenryu into the new Super World of Sports promotion.

=== The New Footloose (1998–2002) ===
In 1998, Samson (now Kodo) Fuyuki formed The New Footloose with Yukihiro Kanemura in Frontier Martial-Arts Wrestling. Fuyuki and Kanemura teamed together in tag team and six-man matches regularly until the promotion closed in 2002.

== Championships and accomplishments ==
- All Japan Pro Wrestling
  - All Asia Tag Team Championship (3 times)
