= Toshiaki Kawada =

Japanese professional wrestler

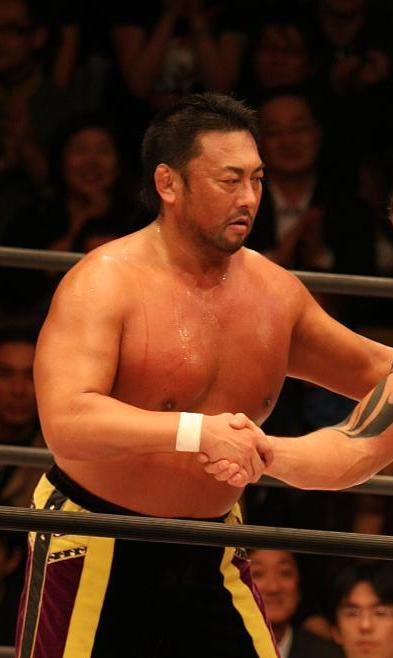
- Kawada in 2008

Personal information
- Born: December 8, 1963 (age 62) Ohira, Japan

Professional wrestling career
- Ring name(s): Black Mephisto; Hustle K Kio Kawada; Monster K Mr. Toshiaki; Toshiaki Kawada
- Billed height: 1.83 m (6 ft 0 in)
- Billed weight: 105 kg (231 lb)
- Trained by: Akio Sato; Giant Baba; Genichiro Tenryu; All Japan Pro Wrestling
- Debut: October 4, 1982
- Retired: August 15, 2010 (last match to date)

Toshiaki Kawada (川田 利明, Kawada Toshiaki) (born December 8, 1963) is a Japanese retired professional wrestler. He is best known for his work in All Japan Pro Wrestling (AJPW), whom he worked for from his debut in 1982 up until 2008. In the promotion, he was a five-time Triple Crown Heavyweight Champion, a nine-time World Tag Team Champion, three-time winner of the Real World Tag League and a two-time winner of the Champion Carnival. He was also recognized as the ace of the promotion from 2000 to 2005.

A years-long contemporary of Mitsuharu Misawa, they made their debut in AJPW together in the 1980s. Kawada became the understudy of Genichiro Tenryu, one of the top stars of the promotion at the time, and was so until 1990 when the Revolution stable disbanded in the event of the SWS exodus. From then on, he became one of their top rising stars alongside Misawa and Kenta Kobashi, and would be the founding members of the Super Generation Army (超世代軍, Chou Sedai-gun). In 1993, he broke away from the stable and joined Tsuruta-accomplice Akira Taue as a unit, coining themselves as the Holy Demon Army (聖鬼軍, Sei Ki Gun). Their rivalry with Misawa and Kobashi was a huge turning point for AJPW in the 1990s, and the individual rivalry between Kawada and Misawa was considered the defining storyline of the 1990s in AJPW and Japan all-together. That same year, he had been coined as a member of the Four Heavenly Kings (プロレスの四天王, Puroresu no shiten'nō; also called the Four Pillars of Heaven) (Note: Named after the Four Heavenly Kings, this nomenclature was given to the four by Tokyo Sports journalist Shoichi Shibata, and christened by Baba and the magazine.) line-up, alongside Misawa, Kobashi, and Taue.

When Misawa ended his relationship with AJPW and formed Pro Wrestling Noah, Kawada stayed loyal to AJPW, and was then picked by Motoko Baba (the widow of Giant Baba, the company founder) to be the leading wrestler on the roster. He had the longest individual reign of any Triple Crown Heavyweight Champion in the 2000s, and was tied (with Kento Miyahara's fourth reign) for the most defenses of any individual reign with 10. In the midst of the division between AJPW and Noah, he made several appearances with other promotions, most notably New Japan Pro-Wrestling, where he competed for the IWGP Heavyweight Championship at Wrestling World 2001 in the Tokyo Dome against Kensuke Sasaki. He became a freelancer in 2005, and made his first in-ring appearance for Noah at the Destiny 2005 pay-per-view, losing to Misawa. He also competed for Hustle, where he assumed many comedic roles.

He won his last world title, the ZERO1 World Heavyweight Championship, in October 2009, defeating Masato Tanaka and losing it to Kohei Sato the next year. After the death of Misawa in June 2009 in a freak ring accident, Kawada slowed down his role as a pro wrestler, and had his final match on August 15, 2010 during the G1 Climax XX tournament, unbeknownst to the majority of his contemporaries and fans. After his final match, he began to collaborate more with his contemporaries outside the ring, including Kobashi and Taue (the surviving Heavenly Kings), Jushin Liger, Katsuhiko Nakajima, and student Taichi.

Known by fans and his contemporaries as "Dangerous K" (デンジャラス K, Denjarasu kei) for his extremely stiff wrestling style and martial arts strikes, he is widely considered one of the greatest wrestlers of all time. His matches against Mitsuharu Misawa, Jun Akiyama, Akira Taue, and Kenta Kobashi in the 1990s are argued by many fans and experts in the industry as some of the greatest professional wrestling matches of all time. He also has the distinction of having three Tokyo Sports Best Bout awards, which too brought him the distinction of being nicknamed the "Best Match Machine" (名勝負製造機, Mei shōbu seizō-ki).

== Professional wrestling career ==
=== All Japan Pro Wrestling (1982–2005) ===
==== Early years (1982–1987) ====
Kawada was very active during his high school years in amateur wrestling, becoming a national champion in his senior year after defeating Keiichi Yamada (who later became Jyushin Thunder Liger in professional wrestling) in the finals. Kawada attended the Ashikaga University High school, which happened to be the same high school as Misawa, who was one year Kawada's senior. Towards the end of Kawada's last year of junior high school, he had made an introductory test at the New Japan Pro-Wrestling dojo, however his mother told him that it would be better for him if he graduated from high school, before beginning his pro wrestling career. Thus when Kawada was about to meet the end of his high school days, his close friend Mitsuharu Misawa who had already been recruited in the All Japan Pro Wrestling dojo, a year prior, advised Kawada to try out for the rival company, AJPW instead. Making his professional debut against Hiromichi Fuyuki on the 4th of October, 1982.Kawada was then sent to North America for a year in November 1985, where he gained experience as a professional wrestler in Fred Behrend's Texas All-Star Wrestling (San Antonio, Texas), Stu Hart's Stampede Wrestling (in Calgary) and Frank Valois' International Wrestling (in Montreal); despite having no Korean heritage, Kawada was billed as "Kio Kawata" from Seoul, South Korea in Stampede Wrestling for a very short time around June 1986. Reportedly unhappy with his time overseas, Kawada has rarely spoken about his experiences in America in subsequent years.

==== Revolution and Footloose (1987–1990) ====
His first major break came in 1987 when he joined his mentor Genichiro Tenryu's Revolution group. Kawada was paired with Hiromichi Fuyuki, forming a tag team known as "Footloose". The duo held the All Asia Tag Team Championship on three occasions between March 9, 1988, and October 20, 1989; their standout rivalries were against Shunji Takano and Shinichi Nakano, as well as against the Can-Am Express (Dan Kroffat and Doug Furnas).

When Revolution stable mate Ashura Hara was expelled from All Japan in November 1988 for gambling debts, Kawada was promoted to team with Tenryu in that year's World's Strongest Tag Determination League, losing a memorable final match to Stan Hansen and Terry Gordy.

In July 1989, during a match with Shunji Takano, Kawada lost four front teeth in a freak accident. As Kawada gave Takano a German suplex, Takano's back landed on Kawada's face, causing his front teeth to break off and get stuck on Takano's back and several roots of his teeth were sticking out from his gums.

==== Super Generation Army (1990–1993) ====
In the summer of 1990, after Tenryu and a number of other All Japan wrestlers had left the promotion to join Tenryu's newly formed Super World of Sports, Kawada became Mitsuharu Misawa's main partner in the Jumbo Tsuruta vs Misawa & Co. feud, pitting Tsuruta's "Tsuruta-Gun" against Misawa's "Super Generation Army". As part of the feud, Kawada began a heated rivalry with Tsuruta's main partner Akira Taue, stemming over Taue defecting to Tsuruta's side. Misawa and Kawada would win the World Tag Team Championship twice, as well as the 1992 World's Strongest Tag Determination League. He earned his first Triple Crown Heavyweight Championship opportunity on October 24, 1991, unsuccessfully challenging Tsuruta, and was also turned back in the following year in Triple Crown challenges to Stan Hansen (June 5, 1992) and Misawa (October 21, 1992); the match with Hansen was named Match of the Year by Tokyo Sports, and finished second behind the Misawa match in Weekly Pro Wrestling's year end fan poll for Match of the Year.

==== Holy Demon Army and main event push (1993–1995) ====
In early 1993, after it became apparent that Tsuruta's days as a competitive wrestler were over, All Japan promoter Giant Baba asked Kawada to form a tag team with his rival Akira Taue. Kawada agreed, signalling the end of his alliance with Misawa. Kawada and Taue went to a draw in the 1993 Champion Carnival and ended their feud with a handshake. In their first title match as a team, Kawada and Taue, named the Holy Demon Army (聖鬼軍, Sei Ki Gun), defeated World Tag Team Champions Terry Gordy and Steve Williams. Shortly afterward, they successfully defended the title against Misawa and Kenta Kobashi on June 1, 1993, in a match that Baba (at the time) regarded as the greatest match he'd ever seen; it was the first of nine legendary matches between the sides, and Kawada would hold the World Tag Team Championship with Taue six times.

Kawada's greatest achievement to that point came when he won the 1994 Champion Carnival by defeating Steve Williams on April 16. Kawada followed by losing his third straight Triple Crown challenge against Mitsuharu Misawa in the June 3, 1994. Their 36-minute bout was highly acclaimed by journalists and magazines, being called the greatest match of the decade in later years. After Williams lifted the Triple Crown from Misawa, Kawada defeated Williams on October 22, 1994; his title reign lasted one successful defense, as he went to a one-hour draw with Kenta Kobashi in Osaka on January 19; it has been called the greatest one hour match in pro wrestling history by Wrestling Observer's Dave Meltzer. Stan Hansen ended Kawada's Triple Crown reign on March 4, 1995. Kawada pinned Misawa for the first time on June 9, 1995, when he teamed with Taue to face Misawa and Kobashi, but Misawa and Kobashi came back to defeat them in the Tag League Final in the last straight tag meeting of the two teams.

==== All-Japan Ace (1996–2005) ====
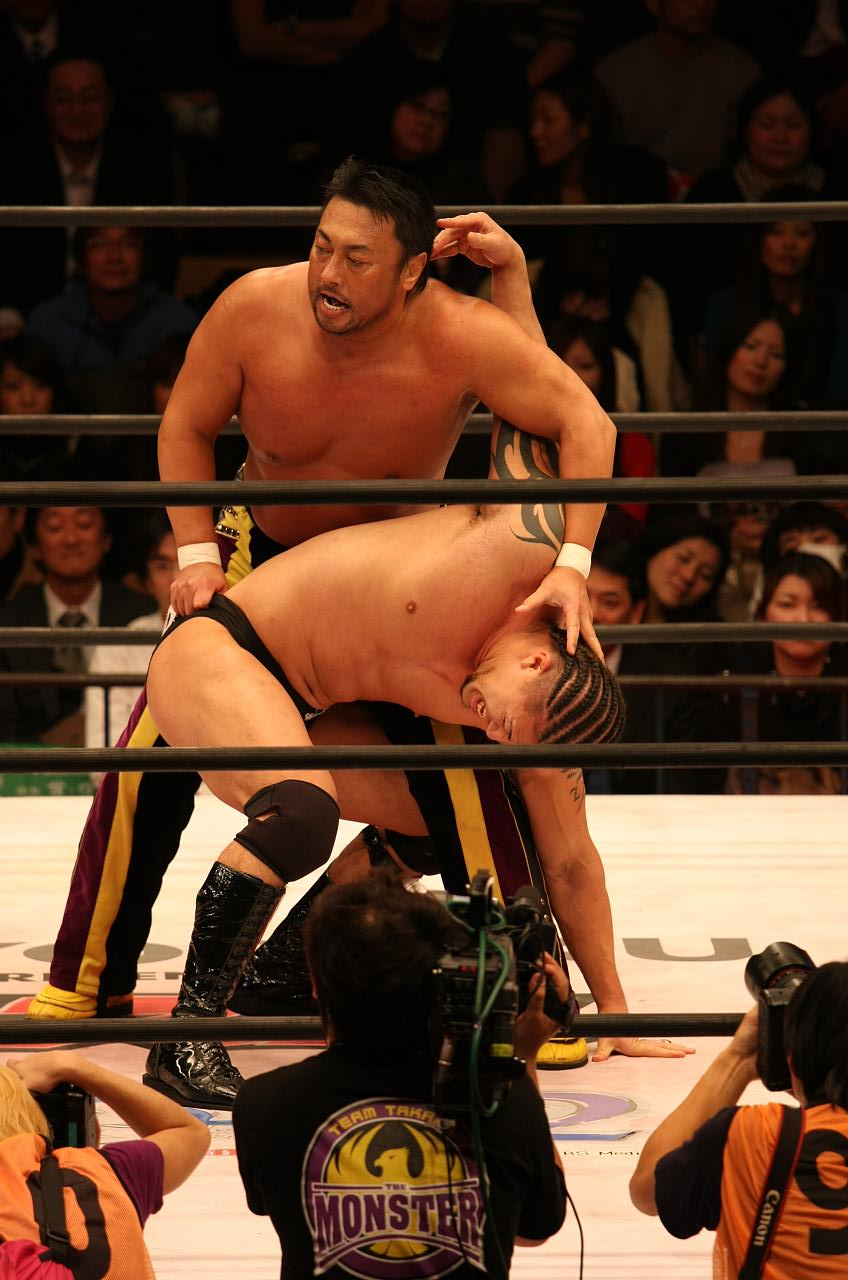
Kawada performing an abdominal stretch on Zeus

Kawada spent much of 1996 in Giant Baba's doghouse for publicly questioning All Japan's isolationist promotional policy at a time when rival New Japan drew record business running interpromotional matches; he watched Taue and Kobashi win the Triple Crown in the place of what looked to be the time for "his push". Kawada worked one interpromotional match on a major UWFi show, but All Japan chose not to follow up on either a promotional feud with UWFi nor on the sudden attention Kawada drew. He was allowed out of the doghouse in time for Kawada & Taue to break through in 1996 to win the World's Strongest Tag Determination League for the first time, beating Misawa and Jun Akiyama. Kawada pinned Misawa for the first time in a singles match in the 1997 Carnival Finals mini-round robin, then followed up to pin Kobashi the same night to win the Carnival championship for the second time; neither win had quite the impact one would expect given the results. Kawada and Taue would take their second straight World Tag League championship to close out year that saw both spend much of it in the shadows of Misawa and Kobashi. The crowning moment of Kawada's career came on May 1, 1998, as he pinned Misawa for the second time to win the Triple Crown at All Japan's first Tokyo Dome show, the 25th Anniversary. However, he was promptly defeated by Kobashi on June 12, 1998, in his first title defense. After receiving little singles push over the last half of 1998, Kawada was given (with no build up) a Triple Crown match against Misawa on January 22, 1999; in something of a surprise, Kawada took his second straight Triple Crown match against Misawa to win with title for the third time. However, he broke his arm during the match and vacated the title the following day. Kawada returned in May 1999, but would revert to the sidelines due to an eye injury in August. He did not return until January 2000, but suffered high-profile losses to Kobashi, Vader, and Misawa. In June 2000, Kawada and Taue won the World Tag Team Championship for the sixth time, breaking a record they shared with not only Jumbo Tsuruta and Yoshiaki Yatsu, but Terry Gordy and Steve Williams as well.

Following the June 2000 series, Misawa and all but two native talent in All Japan resigned from their positions and defected to the newly formed Pro Wrestling Noah promotion; Toshiaki Kawada and Masanobu Fuchi were the only two native talent to stay with All Japan Pro Wrestling. With the promotion gutted of top talent, Kawada's old mentor Genichiro Tenryu was brought back and an interpromotional agreement was struck with New Japan; the first key match against New Japan saw Kawada defeat IWGP Heavyweight Champion Kensuke Sasaki on October 9, 2000, in a non-title match. On September 6, 2003, he won the Triple Crown for the fifth time in a tournament final against Shinjiro Ohtani. This time, however, Kawada embarked on a magnificent reign with 10 successful title defenses against the likes of Genichiro Tenryu, Shinya Hashimoto, Jamal, Taiyō Kea, Kensuke Sasaki and Hiroyoshi Tenzan; as a result, Kawada broke Misawa's record of 8 defenses during Misawa's third reign. In addition, 2004 became only the second year when the Triple Crown did not change hands (the first was 1993, during Misawa's first reign), which included a successful defense against Mick Foley in the HUSTLE promotion; in Misawa's era, the title was not defended during the Champion Carnival and World's Strongest Tag Determination League tours, which were dedicated to their namesake tournaments. Kawada's reign restored dignity to the Triple Crown at the expense of the said tournaments.

=== Freelance (2005–2010) ===
After losing the titles to Satoshi Kojima on February 16, 2005, Kawada signed a contract with Dream Stage Entertainment, the parent company of PRIDE Fighting Championships. Kawada made the sports entertainment based HUSTLE promotion his new home, and immediately turned heel in 2005; he turned his back on his young student Taichi Ishikari and friends Shinjiro Ohtani and Naoya Ogawa of the HUSTLE Army to join the dastardly Monster Army, led by Generalissimo Takada and swimsuit model Yinling the Erotic Terrorist. Due to the way Kawada's contract with DSE was structured, he was free to work where he pleased (including New Japan Pro-Wrestling, Pro Wrestling Noah, and other various independent groups). However, when All Japan reopened relations with FEG to begin running WRESTLE-1 shows again in 2005 with the parent company of PRIDE's biggest competitor in Japan (that being the K-1 fighting group, run by FEG), DSE requested that Kawada not work for All Japan any longer because of the conflict of interest. On July 18, 2005, at the Tokyo Dome, Kawada wrestled one final 27-minute classic against his old rival Mitsuharu Misawa.

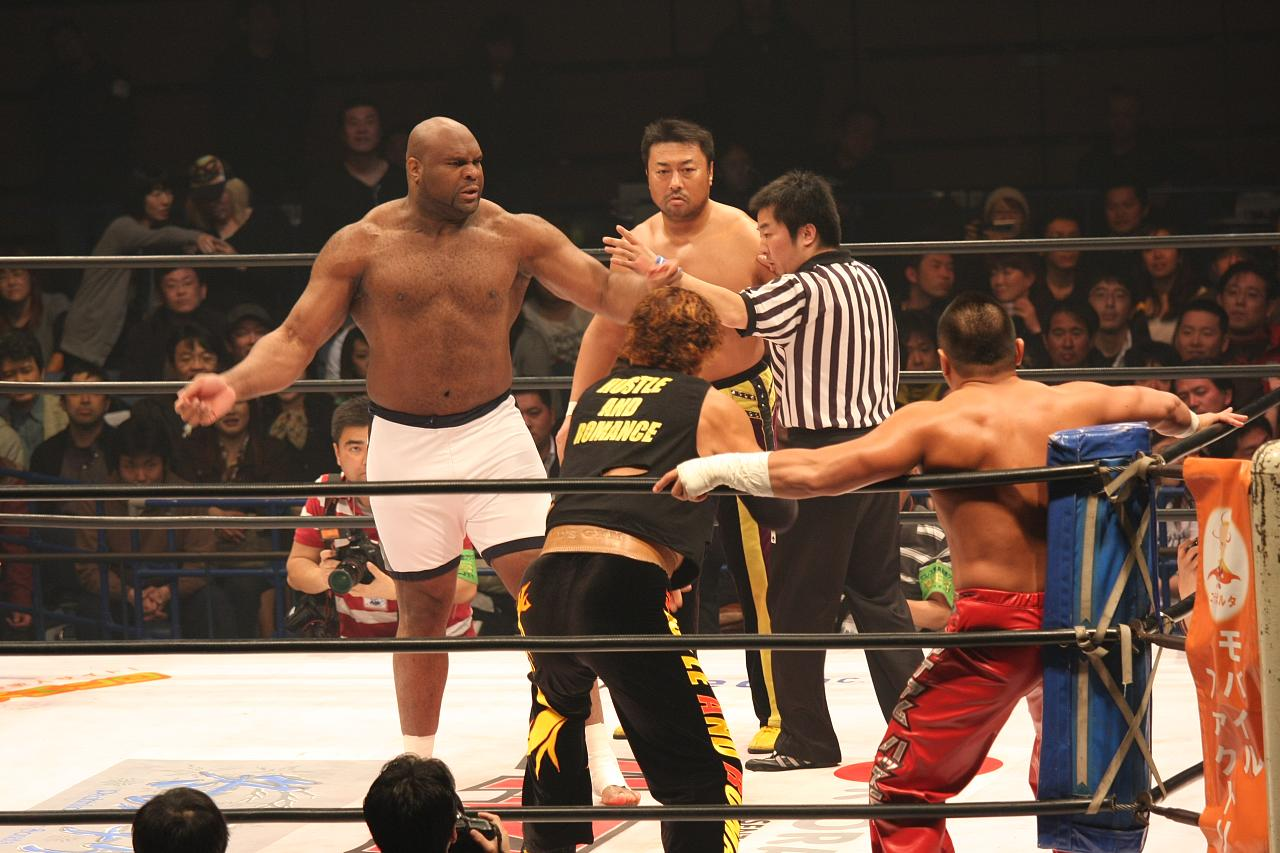
Kawada (right) and Bob Sapp (left) look at their opponents during a match in HUSTLE.

In July 2006, All Japan officially ended their relationship with FEG. Kawada immediately expressed interest to work in his home promotion once again, and finally made his long-awaited return on July 30, 2006, defeating D'Lo Brown. Following his win of the Triple Crown on 3 July 2006, Taiyo Kea named Kawada as the first challenger for the title, and the match was held at the inaugural Pro Wrestling Love in Ryogoku event on 27 August. However, Kawada was unsuccessful, falling to his own finishing maneuver (the powerbomb). Kawada continued to compete in both All-Japan and HUSTLE, as well as defeating Shinsuke Nakamura at the All-Japan/New Japan "Wrestle Kingdom" supershow on January 4, 2007, with a running kick to the face. At Pro Wrestling Love in Ryogoku, Vol. 2 (on February 17, 2007), Toshiaki Kawada and Taiyo Kea defeated RO'Z and Suwama for the World Tag Team Championship; this win gives Kawada his ninth reign with the championship, as well as Kea's 5th reign. During March 26–30, 2007, Toshiaki Kawada competed in the year's Champion Carnival tournament, going all the way to the finals where he fell to Keiji Mutoh; Kawada finished the tournament with 5 points (2 wins, 2 losses and 1 draw). During the Hold Out Tour on April 22, 2007, Toshiaki Kawada lost to Vampiro, after the Great Muta had interfered and sprayed mist in Kawada's eyes. Muta and Vampiro later challenged Kea and Kawada for the World Tag Team Championship at Pro Wrestling Love in Nagoya (on April 30), but Kawada and Kea were successful in their defense of the belts. On June 24, 2007, Satoshi Kojima turned his back on All-Japan Pro Wrestling and aligned himself with All-Japan's nemesis, the Voodoo Murders group; this angered Kawada, who had left Kojima to lead All-Japan when he lost the Triple Crown in 2005. On August 26, 2007, at Pro Wrestling Love in Ryogoku, Vol. 3, Kawada and Kea lost the World Tag Team Championship to Satoshi Kojima and TARU. On September 16, following the conclusion of the opening show for the 2007 Flashing Tour, Kawada issued a challenge to Kensuke Sasaki for the Triple Crown Championship; Sasaki accepted, and Kawada challenged for the title at All-Japan's 35th Anniversary Pro Wrestling Love in Yoyogi show on October 18, 2007. Kawada also teamed with Ryuji Hijikata to challenge Sasaki and Katsuhiko Nakajima on September 29, 2007, at the final show of the Flashing Tour. Kawada competed in Block A of the 2008 Champion Carnival in April, where he most notably wrestled Hiroshi Tanahashi to a draw, and pinned Keiji Muto in what would be his final All Japan match on April 9, 2008.

On October 3, 2009, at the Mitsuharu Misawa memorial show, Kawada and Akira Taue reunited the Holy Demon Army for one night and defeated Jun Akiyama and KENTA. Three weeks later, he defeated Masato Tanaka to win the Zero1 World Heavyweight Championship. Kawada returned to NOAH in late February 28, 2010, trading victories with Takeshi Morishima. Two weeks Later, Kawada would be announced as a part of NOAH's inaugural Global League. On April 11 he lost the World Heavyweight Championship to Kohei Sato. In the Global League, he earned second place in his group and thus did not compete in the final.

On August 15 he participated in the last card of New Japan's G1 Climax tournament for the year, teaming with mentor Tenryu and Tiger Mask to defeat Riki Choshu, Junji Hirata and Akira Nogami. This turned out to be the last match Kawada has wrestled to date. Although at the time, Kawada had not announced a formal retirement, he admitted that the death of his rival Misawa in 2009 diminished his passion for the sport. In 2013, he attended Kenta Kobashi's own retirement ceremony and greeted his also former rival; however, he refused to participate in Akira Taue's retirement match later in the year, although he similarly attended the ceremony and greeted Taue.

== Personal life ==
Outside of professional wrestling, he has owned and managed a ramen shop in Tokyo entitled "Men-gerous K".

During his visit to Japan for the 2023 G1 Climax, Eddie Kingston visited the shop and spoke to Kawada, paying his respects. The two reconnected at Starrcast that year, with Sonny Oono providing translation. At both meetings, Kawada teased Kingston about his use of the Northern Lights Bomb as a finisher, suggesting that he should instead use a powerbomb. Eddie agreed, and used the move to defeat Claudio Castagnoli for the Ring of Honor championship a few weeks later at AEW Grand Slam.

== Championships and accomplishments ==
- All Japan Pro Wrestling
  - All Asia Tag Team Championship (3 times) – with Samson Fuyuki
  - Triple Crown Heavyweight Championship (5 times)
  - World Tag Team Championship (9 times) – with Akira Taue (6), Mitsuharu Misawa (2) and Taiyō Kea (1)
  - Champion Carnival (1994, 1997)
  - World's Strongest Tag Determination League (1992) – with Mitsuharu Misawa
  - World's Strongest Tag Determination League (1996, 1997) – with Akira Taue
  - Asunaro Cup (1989)
  - Autumn Festival Tag Team Tournament (2004) – with Taichi Ishikari
  - World's Strongest Tag Determination League Newcomer & Fair Play Award (1989) – with Samson Fuyuki
  - World's Strongest Tag Determination League Fighting Spirit Award (1990) – with Mitsuharu Misawa
  - World's Strongest Tag Determination League Skill Award (1991) – with Mitsuharu Misawa
  - Triple Crown Heavyweight Championship Tournament (2003)
  - World Tag Team Championship Tournament (2000) – with Akira Taue
- HUSTLE
  - GP Tournament (2008)
- New Japan Pro-Wrestling
  - Singles Best Bout (2000) vs. Kensuke Sasaki on October 9
- Nikkan Sports
  - Match of the Year (2000) vs. Kensuke Sasaki on October 9
- Pro Wrestling Zero1
  - World Heavyweight Championship (1 time)
- Pro Wrestling Illustrated
  - Ranked No. 6 of the top 500 singles wrestlers in the PWI 500 in 2004
  - Ranked No. 42 of the top 500 singles wrestlers in the "PWI Years" in 2003
  - Ranked No. 8 of the top 100 tag teams of the "PWI Years" with Akira Taue
  - Ranked No. 11 of the top 100 tag team of the "PWI Years" with Mitsuharu Misawa
  - Ranked No. 69 of the top 100 tag teams of the "PWI Years" with Samson Fuyuki
- Tokyo Sports
  - Outstanding Performance Award (2004)
  - Fighting Spirit Award (1994, 2000)
  - Tag Team of the Year (1991) with Mitsuharu Misawa
  - Tag Team of the Year (1997) with Akira Taue
  - Match of the Year (1992) vs. Stan Hansen on June 5, 1992
  - Match of the Year (1995) with Akira Taue vs. Mitsuharu Misawa and Kenta Kobashi on June 9, 1995
  - Match of the Year (2000) vs. Kensuke Sasaki on October 9, 2000
- Wrestling Observer Newsletter
  - Tag Team of the Year (1991) with Mitsuharu Misawa
  - Wrestler of the Year (1994)
  - Wrestling Observer Newsletter Hall of Fame (Class of 1997)
  - Wrestling Observer Newsletter Hall of Fame (Class of 2022) with Akira Taue
