= Horst Hoffman =

German wrestler

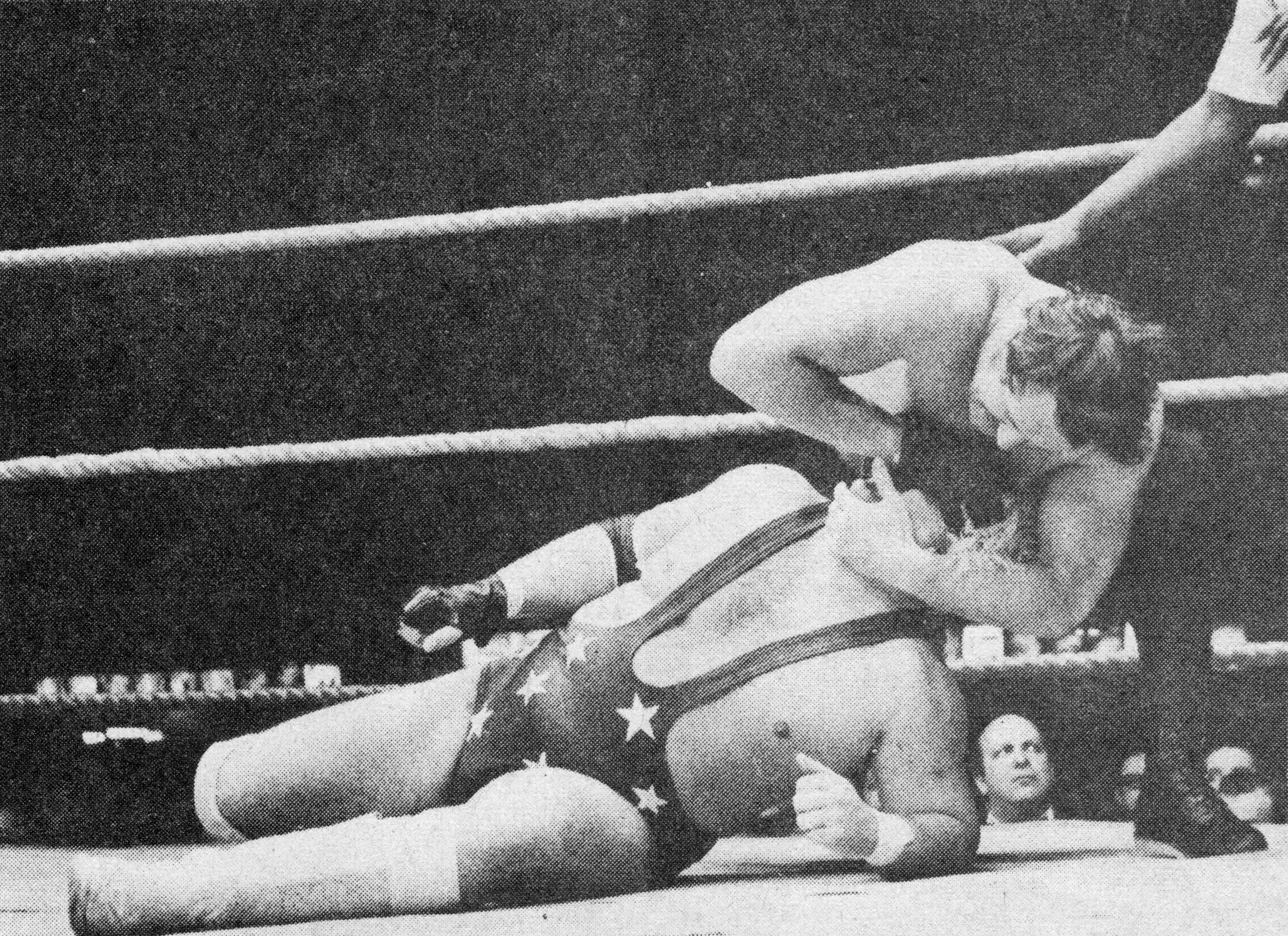
- Hoffman applying a claw hold to Dusty Rhodes during a 1975 match

Personal information
- Born: 29 September 1935 (age 90) Czechoslovakia

Professional wrestling career
- Ring name: Horst Hoffman
- Billed height: 6 ft 3 in (1.91 m)
- Billed weight: 251 lb (114 kg)
- Debut: 23 April 1957
- Retired: 15 December 1977

Horst Hoffman (born 29 September 1935), is a former German professional wrestler. Hoffman worked in Germany, Europe, Japan and American Wrestling Association in the United States during his 20 year career.

== Professional wrestling career ==
Hoffman started his professional wrestling career in 1957 in Germany. He would spend most of his career in Germany. In the 1960s he went to the United Kingdom, France and Austria. It is said that Hoffman won at least ninety tournaments during his career.

In 1972, Hoffman went to Japan working for International Wrestling Enterprise where he started to become well known in wrestling. He competed in the IWE's 4th annual World Series tournament held from 27 March – 6 May 1972. He worked there until 1974.

In 1973, he made his debut in North America for American Wrestling Association in Minnesota where he feuded with Billy Robinson. Hoffman during his AWA stint had matches with Verne Gagne, Nick Bockwinkel, Geoff Portz, Ken Patera, Larry Hennig, Ric Flair, Chris Taylor, Ivan Putski, Andre the Giant, and The Crusher. In 1974 he teamed with German heel Baron Von Raschke and had a popular rivalry with Dusty Rhodes and Superstar Billy Graham.Zordani, Jim. "AWA #32 Page #2". KayfabeMemories.com. He left the AWA in 1975 and returned to Japan.

In 1975, Hoffman made his debut at All Japan Pro Wrestling where he feuded with Giant Baba, The Destroyer, Dory Funk Jr., Anton Geesink and Jumbo Tsuruta. In 1977 he teamed with his arch rival Billy Robinson. By the end of 1977 Hoffman retired from wrestling.

It is said that Mitsuharu Misawa was influenced by Hoffman's green attire and boots that Misawa wore it.

== Championships and accomplishments ==
- British Wrestling Association
  - European Heavyweight Championship (1 time)
