= Revolution (puroresu) =

Professional wrestling stable

Stable
- Members: Ashura Hara; Genichiro Tenryu; Tatsumi Kitahara; Toshiaki Kawada; Samson Fuyuki; Yoshinari Ogawa
- Debut: 1987
- Disbanded: 1990

Revolution was a professional wrestling stable in All Japan Pro Wrestling (AJPW) led by Genichiro Tenryu.

== History ==
=== 1987 ===
After Genichiro Tenryu and Jumbo Tsuruta split up after losing the NWA International Tag Team Championship to The Road Warriors in February 1987, Tenryu and Tsuruta engaged in a brutal rivalry. Tenryu would form his own group, separate from All Japan and Japan Pro Wrestling (which dissolved when most of them returned to New Japan Pro-Wrestling) simply called Revolution. Former International Pro Wrestling stars Ashura Hara and Samson Fuyuki, as well as AJPW youngsters Toshiaki Kawada and Yoshinari Ogawa, were enlisted into the stable. Tenryu and Hara would form Revolution's main tag team, Footloose (Fuyuki and Kawada) were its secondary tag team, while Ogawa focused on the World Junior Heavyweight Championship.

=== 1988 ===
In 1988, Revolution began its successful run, as Footloose won the All Asia Tag Team Championship on March 9, defeating Takashi Ishikawa and Mighty Inoue. A month later on April 8, Tatsumi Kitahara debuted and joined Revolution, before heading to Stampede Wrestling in Calgary for seasoning.

Four months later on August 29, Genichiro Tenryu and Ashura Hara defeated The Olympics (Jumbo Tsuruta and Yoshiaki Yatsu) for the World Tag Team Championship. However, the reign did not last long, as Tenryu and Hara lost the championship back to The Olympics 24 hours later on August 30.

Footloose would lose the All Asia Tag Team Championship on September 9, after a six-month reign, to Shinichi Nakano and Shunji Takano. However, Footloose rebounded and regained the championship six days later on September 15.

In November 1988, Hara was fired from AJPW by Giant Baba for massive gambling debts, so Kawada was chosen to team up with Tenryu for the World's Strongest Tag Determination League. Tenryu and Kawada would be in 4th place with 14 points. By the end of the year, The Road Warriors chose Tenryu to be their partner to hold the NWA World Six-Man Tag Team Championship in December, and was eventually abandoned in the following year.

=== 1989 ===
On June 5, 1989, Revolution would have the biggest night, when Genichiro Tenryu defeated Jumbo Tsuruta for the Triple Crown Heavyweight Championship, despite Footloose losing the All Asia Tag Team Championship to The Can-Am Express (Doug Furnas and Dan Kroffat) the same night.

Two months later on August 18 in Canada, Tatsumi Kitahara (Sumo Hara in Stampede) teamed up with New Japan star Kensuke Sasaki (Benkei Sasaki in Stampede) and won the Stampede Wrestling International Tag Team Championship, defeating Bob and Kerry Brown. Kitahara would hold onto the title for over a month until September 29, when he and Sasaki lost the championship to the eventual final champions The Blackhearts.

A month later, back in Japan, on October 11, Tenryu lost the Triple Crown back to Tsuruta. However, the group rebounded nine days later on October 20, when Footloose regained the All Asia Tag Team Championship from the Can-Am Express. A month later in November, Tenryu, Fuyuki, and Kawada would take part in the World's Strongest Tag Determination League, with Tenryu winning the tournament with Stan Hansen as his partner, winning the vacant World Tag Team title.

=== 1990 ===
1990 was the beginning of the end for Revolution. On March 2, Footloose lost the All Asia Tag Team Championship back to the Can-Am Express. Four days later on March 6, Genichiro Tenryu and Stan Hansen lost the World Tag Team Championship to The Miracle Violence Connection (Steve Williams and Terry Gordy).

On April 26, Tenryu abruptly left All Japan Pro Wrestling, shocking the entire professional wrestling industry in Japan, effectively dissolving Revolution.

After Tenryu's departure, Footloose disbanded. Toshiaki Kawada and Samson Fuyuki temporarily feuded, before Fuyuki joined Tenryu. Upon returning from Canada, Tatsumi Kitahara joined Tenryu as well.

Kawada and Yoshinari Ogawa stayed with AJPW.

== Aftermath ==
Genichiro Tenryu would use the Revolution name for his stable of his new home promotion, Super World of Sports, in which Samson Fuyuki, Tatsumi (later Koki) Kitahara, and Ashura Hara would be part of the stable as well. After SWS shut down in June 1992, Tenryu and his group formed WAR.

Hara retired in October 1994 and died in 2015.

Fuyuki and Kitahara later feuded with Tenryu and with each other in WAR; Fuyuki moved on to FMW in 1996. After WAR folded, Tenryu feuded with Kawada upon returning to All Japan in 2000 and faced Ogawa in Pro Wrestling Noah in the 2000s. Fuyuki, who briefly returned to AJPW in 2001 to feud with Kawada, died in 2003.

Following the NOAH split in 2000, Hansen and Tenryu teamed up for one more tag team match, in which they defeated Kawada and Maunakea Mossman (later Taiyo Kea) meant to rebuild AJPW. Later that year, Hansen and Tenryu were drawn against each other in a tournament for the vacant Triple Crown, which Tenryu won. It turned out to be Hansen's last singles match, as he retired and became Commissioner of the Pacific Wrestling Federation. In the final match of the tournament, Tenryu beat Kawada. Kitahara briefly returned to AJPW to ally with Tenryu before decreasing his yearly workload of matches altogether.

Kawada left AJPW in 2005 and began inactivity in August 2010, after a six-man match with Tenryu as one of his partners.

In February 2015, Tenryu announced that he is retiring from professional wrestling; his last match was held on November 15.

On April 2, 2018, Kitahara announced his retirement and his retirement ceremony will take place on June 11 at a show promoted by AJPW dojo classmate Kenta Kobashi, which will also be his 30th anniversary.

Yoshinari Ogawa was the last active member, retiring on August 15, 2024 as a result of a neck injury, with no retirement ceremony.

== Members ==
=== Main members ===
- Genichiro Tenryu, leader (1987–1990)
- Ashura Hara (1987–1988)
- Samson Fuyuki (1987–1990)
- Toshiaki Kawada (1987–1990)
- Yoshinari Ogawa (1987–1990)
- Tatsumi Kitahara (1988–1990)

== Championships and accomplishments ==
- All Japan Pro Wrestling
  - All Asia Tag Team Championship – Fuyuki and Kawada (3)
  - Triple Crown Heavyweight Championship – Tenryu (1)
  - World Tag Team Championship – Tenryu (2), Hara (1)
  - World's Strongest Tag Determination League – Tenryu (with Stan Hansen) (1989)
- Stampede Wrestling
  - Stampede Wrestling International Tag Team Championship – Kitahara (with Kensuke Sasaki) (1)

== See also ==
- Footloose (professional wrestling)
- Super World of Sports
- WAR (wrestling promotion)
