= Kazuo Tokumitsu =

Japanese TV presenter and announcer (born 1941)

- 徳光 和夫
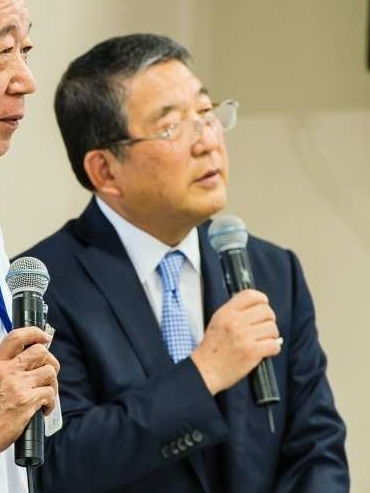
- in 2015
- Born: March 10, 1941 (age 84); Meguro, Tokyo, Japan
- Occupation(s): TV presenter, announcer
- Employer(s): Nippon Television, Tokyo Broadcasting System
- Television: The Sunday Next, Kazuo Tokumitsu's Moving Reunions

Kazuo Tokumitsu (徳光 和夫, Tokumitsu Kazuo; born 10 March 1941 in Meguro, Tokyo) is a Japanese TV presenter and announcer.

He is the main presenter on the Nippon Television Sunday morning TV topical news programme The Sunday Next. He is also the main presenter on the Tokyo Broadcasting System programme Kazuo Tokumitsu's Moving Reunions (徳光和夫の感動再会"逢いたい", Tokumitsu Kazuo no Kando Saikai "Aitai"). He is a big fan of Yomiuri Giants.

== Family ==
- Mitzu Mangrove - Nephew.Japanese TV personality.
