= CyberFight Festival 2021 =

2021 CyberFight event

- Promotional poster featuring various wrestlers from DDT, Noah, TJPW, and GanPro
- Promotion: CyberFight
- Brand(s): DDT Pro-Wrestling (DDT); Pro Wrestling Noah (Noah); Tokyo Joshi Pro Wrestling (TJPW); Ganbare☆Pro-Wrestling (GanPro)
- Date: June 6, 2021
- City: Saitama, Japan
- Venue: Saitama Super Arena
- Attendance: 4,800
- Tagline: CyberFight presents Pro-Wrestling Festival

Event chronology
| ← Previous; Noah; Mitsuharu Misawa Memorial 2021; DDT; Judgement 2021: DDT 24th Anniversary | Next → Noah; Cross Over in Sendai 2021; DDT; Wrestle Peter Pan 2021 |

CyberFight Festival chronology
| ← Previous; First | Next → 2022 |

CyberFight Festival 2021 was a professional wrestling event promoted by CyberFight for its four brands, DDT Pro-Wrestling (DDT), Pro Wrestling Noah (Noah), Tokyo Joshi Pro Wrestling (TJPW), and Ganbare☆Pro-Wrestling (GanPro). It took place on June 6, 2021, in Saitama, Japan, at the Saitama Super Arena and aired live on CyberFight's streaming service Wrestle Universe where it also featured English commentary.

The card comprised fifteen matches, with the first three being part of the Starting Battle pre-show. In the triple main event, Miyu Yamashita defeated Yuka Sakazaki to retain the Princess of Princess Championship, Jun Akiyama defeated Harashima to retain the KO-D Openweight Championship, and Naomichi Marufuji defeated Keiji Mutoh to win the GHC Heavyweight Championship, five years after his last reign. Other prominent matches saw The37Kamiina (Konosuke Takeshita and Yuki Ueno) defeat Kaito Kiyomiya and Yoshiki Inamura, a DDT team led by Sanshiro Takagi defeated the Noah stable Kongō led by Kenoh in a 12-man tag team match, and Sugiura-gun (Takashi Sugiura and Kazushi Sakuraba) defeated Danshoku Dino and Super Sasadango Machine.

It was the first CyberFight promoted event to feature all four of its brands.

== Production ==
=== Background ===
On September 1, 2017, the Japanese digital advertising company CyberAgent acquired 100% of DDT Pro-Wrestling's (DDT) shares, including its sub-brands Tokyo Joshi Pro Wrestling (TJPW) and Ganbare☆Pro-Wrestling (GanPro). On January 28, 2020, following months of negotiation, LIDET Entertainment sold its shares of Pro Wrestling Noah (Noah) to CyberAgent. On July 27, it was announced that Noah and DDT, along with TJPW and GanPro, would merge in a new promotion called CyberFight, which would oversee and promote the four individual promotions. The decision came after financial troubles faced by Noah and DDT due to the COVID-19 pandemic. On February 25, 2021, CyberFight president Sanshiro Takagi, CyberFight's executive vice-presidents Akito and Naomichi Marufuji, GanPro representative Ken Ohka, and TJPW representative Tetsuya Koda held a press conference, announcing that the four brands would be working together to promote an event on June 6 at the Saitama Super Arena, with the three main championships of CyberFight, DDT's KO-D Openweight Championship, Noah's GHC Heavyweight Championship, and TJPW's Princess of Princess Championship being defended at the event.

==== Impact of the COVID-19 pandemic ====
In April 2020, DDT announced that their flagship event Wrestle Peter Pan 2020, which was originally meant to be held at the Saitama Super Arena, would be postponed following Japan's declaration of a State of Emergency due to the pandemic. In May, the event was eventually rescheduled to take place over two days, on June 6 and 7, without an audience in Shinjuku Face. On February 12, 2021, Noah had to hold their Destination 2021: Back to Budokan event in a two-part system as a way to comply with the state of emergency restrictions announced by Prime Minister Yoshihide Suga.

On June 2, Yasutaka Yano and Yo-Hey were pulled of the event after having been in contact with someone who had tested positive for COVID-19.

=== Storylines ===
CyberFight Festival 2021 featured fifteen professional wrestling matches that resulted from scripted storylines, where wrestlers portrayed villains, heroes, or less distinguishable characters in the scripted events that built tension and culminated in a wrestling match or series of matches.

On April 29, at Noah: The Glory, Keiji Mutoh successfully defended the GHC Heavyweight Championship against Masa Kitamiya while his M's Alliance stablemate Naomichi Marufuji provided guest commentary. After the match, Marufuji entered the ring to challenge Mutoh to a championship bout. Mutoh agreed to a title match at CyberFight Festival.

On April 11, at April Fool 2021, Jun Akiyama achieved his second KO-D Openweight Championship title defense against Danshoku Dino. After the match, he nominated Harashima, a 20-year DDT veteran and 10-time KO-D Openweight Champion, as his next challenger.

On May 4, at Yes! Wonderland 2021, Yuka Sakazaki defeated Mizuki and Shoko Nakajima in a three-way match to become the number one contender to the Princess of Princess Championship. Later that night, Miyu Yamashita beat Rika Tatsumi to win the title for her third reign. A championship match was then immediately scheduled for CyberFight Festival.

On February 24, CyberFight announced a partial match card for the event, which included Kaito Kiyomiya and Yoshiki Inamura facing Konosuke Takeshita and Yuki Ueno. Kiyomiya and Inamura made an appearance on DDT's April 15 event, where they sat at ringside to watch Ueno's match. Ueno called them out and confronted them, hyping up their upcoming match.

In January 2020, shortly after Sanshiro Takagi was appointed president of Noah, Kenoh, leader of the Kongō stable, voiced his disdain for Takagi and his style of wrestling which he regarded as inferior and insulting. This rivalry led to a six-man tag team match on the first night of Wrestle Peter Pan 2020 that saw Kongō win. A year later, the CyberFight Festival event reignited the rivalry and a 14-man tag team match was scheduled pitting the entire Kongō crew against a DDT team led by Takagi. However, in early June 2021, a grudge between the GHC Tag Team Champions Masa Kitamiya and Katsuhiko Nakajima led to Kitamiya leaving Kongō. The match was then changed to a 12-man tag team match and a singles bout between Kitamiya and Hideki Okatani was added to the card.

In early May 2021, SKE48 idol Yuki Arai joined TJPW as an active wrestler. Arai had already wrestled a match in 2018 as a guest celebrity and is a former Ironman Heavymetalweight Champion. Her "re-debut" was scheduled for the Yes! Wonderland 2021 event on May 4 where she teamed with Miu Watanabe in a losing effort against Maki Itoh and Arisu Endo. Itoh, an idol herself and former member of LinQ (from which she was dismissed in 2017), took umbrage about the attention Arai was receiving, thus igniting a rivalry between the two.

On April 26, CyberFight announced that a preliminary card titled "Starting Battle" would take place before the actual event. This undercard would see the return of Yoshiaki Yatsu (who had made his DDT debut in April 2019, one month before having his right leg amputated below the knee due to a bacterial infection) in a Rumble rules match. On May 9, Toru Owashi, Kazuki Hirata, Makoto Oishi, Saki Akai, Antonio Honda, Yusuke Okada, Yuya Koroku, Yuji Hino, Yuna Manase and Shu Sakurai were announced as participants in the rumble at the Ultimate Tag League 2021 in Korakuen Hall. Later, on June 2, Shuhei Taniguchi, Akitoshi Saito, Muhammad Yone and Masao Inoue were also listed as participants.

== Event ==
Other on-screen personnel
| Role: | Name: |
|---|---|
| Japanese Commentators | Haruo Murata |
| Japanese Commentators | Sayoko Mita |
| Japanese Commentators | Kagehiro Osano |
| Japanese Commentators | Junji Shiono |
| Japanese Commentators | Hikaru Inoue |
| Japanese Commentators | Shinya Aoki (guest) |
| Japanese Commentators | Kenta Kobashi (guest) |
| Japanese Commentators | Jurina Matsui (guest) |
| Japanese Commentators | Kuniko Yamada (guest) |
| English Commentators | Stewart Fulton |
| English Commentators | Mark Pickering |
| English Commentators | Baliyan Akki |
| English Commentators | Hiroshi Arai |
| Ring announcers | Inoue Mic |
| Ring announcers | Fuyuki Mikata |
| Ring announcers | Sayuri Namba |
| Referees | Akihiko Fukuda |
| Referees | Daisuke Kiso |
| Referees | Yukinori Matsui |
| Referees | Shinichi Nakayama |
| Referees | Shuichi Nishinaga |

=== Starting Battle ===
Three matches were contested on the ninety-minute Starting Battle pre-show. The first match was Kaya Toribami's debut match in which she teamed with Nao Kakuta, Raku, Pom Harajuku and Mahiro Kiryu to face BeeStar (Mirai Maiumi and Suzume), Haruna Neko, Moka Miyamoto and Arisu Endo. In the end, Maiumi hit Kiryu with a lariat to win the match via pinfall.

Next was a 15-person rumble rules match that saw the return to professional wrestling of Yoshiaki Yatsu. Eliminations could occur via pinfall, submission, knockout or by going over the top rope and having both feet touch the venue floor. In the end, Antonio Honda and Masao Inoue inadvertently hit referee Yukinori Matsui with Honda's "Gongitsune" attack, which gave Honda the opportunity to hit Inoue with a low blow followed by a schoolboy sweep to win the match and an award presented by CyberAgent Managing Director Takahiro Yamauchi.

In the last pre-show match, Ken Ohka, Keisuke Ishii and Shota faced Shuichiro Katsumura, Koki Iwasaki and Yumehito Imanari. Iwasaki performed a lifting inverted DDT on Shota to win the match.

=== Preliminary matches ===
The actual event opened with CyberAgent President and CEO Susumu Fujita welcoming the crowd.

Next, the first match of the main card saw Yuki Iino and Toui Kojima face Junta Miyawaki and Kinya Okada. In the end, Miyawaki submitted Kojima with a cross armbreaker to win the match.

The next match was a TJPW three-way tag team match pitting Kyōraku Kyōmei (Shoko Nakajima and Hyper Misao) against Hakuchūmu (Rika Tatsumi and Miu Watanabe) and Bakuretsu Sisters (Nodoka Tenma and Yuki Aino). In the closing moments, Nakajima performed a diving senton on Aino to win by pinfall.

Next, Sugiura-gun (Takashi Sugiura and Kazushi Sakuraba) put their custom-made "SUGI" and "SAKU" belts on the line against Danshoku Dino and Super Sasadango Machine. Sasadango gave a presentation explaining his plan to beat Sugiura-gun which involved a game of guru guru bat, wearing a Takako Tokiwa mask as a distraction and putting pantyhose over his head to make silly faces. Sugiura and Sakuraba wore masks inspired by Super Strong Machine (as is Sasadango's mask) and proceeded to evade Dino and Sasadango's antics. In the end, Dino forced Sugiura to wear pantyhose on his head, but Sugiura performed an "Olympic Slam" on Sasadango to win the match.

Next, Hideki Okatani faced Masa Kitamiya. Kitamiya made quick work of Okatani, submitting him with a "Prison Lock" in 2 minutes and 25 seconds, making it the shortest match of the event.

In the following match, Hikari Noa, Mizuki and Yuki Arai faced Saitama Itoh Respect Army 2021 (Maki Itoh, Yuki Kamifuku and Marika Kobashi). Itoh heavily targeted Arai throughout the match until Arai was able to hit Itoh with the "Finally" followed by a pin attempt. Kamifuku and Kobashi broke the count and attacked Mizuki and Noa. Meanwhile, Itoh caught Arai in the "Itoh Punish" to win the match.

Next was a Noah match-up in which Momo no Seishun Tag (Atsushi Kotoge and Daisuke Harada) and Hajime Ohara faced Stinger (Yoshinari Ogawa, Hayata and Seiki Yoshioka). In the end, Harada pinned Yoshioka with the "Katayama German Suplex Hold" to win the match.

In the tenth match, Chris Brookes and The37Kamiina (Shunma Katsumata and Mao) faced Damnation (Daisuke Sasaki, Tetsuya Endo and Soma Takao) (accompanied by Mad Paulie). Early in the match, Mao launched himself over the top rope with a plastic case and landed on Sasaki. Later, Katsumata tried to attack Sasaki with a firecracker, however, Sasaki ducked and the blast hit Mao instead. As Mao and Katsumata were standing outside of the ring, Takao hit Brookes with a "Huracánrana" that sent him crashing onto his teammates. Endo followed with a springboard shooting star press to the outside. In the ring, Sasaki brought Mao down to the mat with "La Mística" then transitioned it into the "Crossover Facelock" to win by submission.

Next, Sanshiro Takagi, Akito, Kazusada Higuchi, Yukio Sakaguchi, Naomi Yoshimura and Yukio Naya (accompanied by the sex doll Yoshihiko) faced Kongō (Kenoh, Katsuhiko Nakajima, Manabu Soya, Haoh, Nioh and Tadasuke). As a provocation to Kenoh, the DDT team made their entrance armed with various iconic DDT weapons such as the Dramatic Dream Cycle, a giant hammer and various parts of Mecha Mummy. During the match, Team DDT attempted to use the weapons to no avail as it didn't have any effect on the more serious Noah wrestlers. However, Kenoh ended up riding the Dramatic Dream Cycle to run over Takagi before he and his stable destroyed the bicycle. Sakaguchi and Higuchi came to rescue Takagi. Sakaguchi performed the "God's Right Knee" on Kenoh then put him in a sleeper hold with the help of Yoshihiko. This allowed Takagi to perform the "Sitdown Himawari Bomb" on Haoh to win the match.

Next, The37Kamiina (Konosuke Takeshita and Yuki Ueno) faced Kaito Kiyomiya and Yoshiki Inamura. In the end, Ueno hit a dropkick on Kiyomiya, then performed the "Best Moonsault Ever" to win the match by pinfall.

=== Main event matches ===
The last three match were advertised as a triple main event. First, Miyu Yamashita defended the Princess of Princess Championship against Yuka Sakazaki. In the end, Sakazaki performed the "Magical Girl Chicken Bastard" but Yamashita dodged and performed a German suplex. Sakazaki quickly got back up, dodged Yamashita's "Skull Kick" and caught her with the "Magical Merry-Go-Round". Yamashita kicked out of a pin attempt and finally hit the "Skull Kick" but Sakazaki broke the pin by grabbing the bottom rope. Yamashita feigned the "Crash Rabbit Heat" and redirected herself to hit it from a different angle. She then performed it a second time to retain the title.

In the penultimate match, Jun Akiyama defended the KO-D Openweight Championship against Harashima. In the end, Harashima hit Akiyama with a "Buzzsaw Kick" to set up a springboard "Somato", however, Akiyama rolled out of the way before impact and caught Harashima with a knee strike to the head. He followed it with a running knee strike and then performed the "Exploder '98" for a two-count. Akiyama then applied a guillotine choke on Harashima who rapidly became unresponsive, forcing referee Yukinori Matsui to award Akiyama the victory by technical knockout. Harashima came to his senses and rushed toward Akiyama, seemingly unaware that the match was already over. Matsui and several wrestlers physically separated them before raising Akiyama's hand.

In the last match of the triple main event, Keiji Mutoh defended the GHC Heavyweight Championship against Naomichi Marufuji. After an intense bout that saw Mutoh make an extensive use of the figure four leglock, the climax of the match came when Mutoh performed his famed moonsault (a move he had retired three years earlier on the advice of his doctor). Marufuji, however, kicked out and hit Mutoh with a flourish of kicks and knee strikes capped off by the "Tiger King Zero", after which he covered Mutoh for the pinfall and won the title.

== Results ==
| No. | Results | Stipulations | Times |
|---|---|---|---|
| 1^{P} | BeeStar (Mirai Maiumi and Suzume), Haruna Neko, Moka Miyamoto and Arisu Endo defeated Nao Kakuta, Raku, Pom Harajuku, Mahiro Kiryu and Kaya Toribami by pinfall | Ten-woman tag team match | 12:29 |
| 2^{P} | Antonio Honda won by last eliminating Masao Inoue | 15-person rumble rules match | 22:31 |
| 3^{P} | Shuichiro Katsumura, Kouki Iwasaki and Yumehito Imanari defeated Ken Ohka, Keisuke Ishii and Shota by pinfall | Six-man tag team match | 8:43 |
| 4 | Junta Miyawaki and Kinya Okada defeated Yuki Iino and Toui Kojima by submission | Tag team match | 7:39 |
| 5 | Kyōraku Kyōmei (Shoko Nakajima and Hyper Misao) defeated Hakuchūmu (Rika Tatsumi and Miu Watanabe) and Bakuretsu Sisters (Nodoka Tenma and Yuki Aino) by pinfall | Three-way tag team match | 8:04 |
| 6 | Sugiura-gun (Takashi Sugiura and Kazushi Sakuraba) defeated Danshoku Dino and Super Sasadango Machine by pinfall | Tag team match | 9:25 |
| 7 | Masa Kitamiya defeated Hideki Okatani by submission | Singles match | 2:25 |
| 8 | Saitama Itoh Respect Army 2021 (Maki Itoh, Yuki Kamifuku and Marika Kobashi) defeated Hikari Noa, Mizuki and Yuki Arai by submission | Six-woman tag team match | 13:02 |
| 9 | Momo no Seishun Tag (Atsushi Kotoge and Daisuke Harada) and Hajime Ohara defeated Stinger (Yoshinari Ogawa, Hayata and Seiki Yoshioka) by pinfall | Six-man tag team match | 13:33 |
| 10 | Damnation (Daisuke Sasaki, Tetsuya Endo and Soma Takao) (with Mad Paulie) defeated Chris Brookes and The37Kamiina (Shunma Katsumata and Mao) by submission | Six-man tag team match | 14:36 |
| 11 | Team DDT (Sanshiro Takagi, Akito, Kazusada Higuchi, Yukio Sakaguchi, Naomi Yoshimura and Yukio Naya) (with Yoshihiko) defeated Kongo (Kenoh, Katsuhiko Nakajima, Manabu Soya, Haoh, Nioh and Tadasuke) by pinfall | Twelve-man tag team match | 19:59 |
| 12 | The 37Kamiina (Konosuke Takeshita and Yuki Ueno) defeated Kaito Kiyomiya and Yoshiki Inamura by pinfall | Tag team match | 17:51 |
| 13 | Miyu Yamashita (c) defeated Yuka Sakazaki by pinfall | Singles match for the Princess of Princess Championship | 16:36 |
| 14 | Jun Akiyama (c) defeated Harashima by technical knockout | Singles match for the KO-D Openweight Championship | 18:53 |
| 15 | Naomichi Marufuji defeated Keiji Mutoh (c) by pinfall | Singles match for the GHC Heavyweight Championship | 23:30 |
(c) / – the champion(s) heading into the match; P / – the match was broadcast on the pre-show

Starting Battle 15-person rumble rules match
– DDT
– Noah
– GanPro
– Freelancer
– Winner

| Draw | Entrant | Promotion | Order | Eliminated by | Method | Time |
|---|---|---|---|---|---|---|
| 1 | Yoshiaki Yatsu | Freelancer | 6 | Masao Inoue | Pinfall | 14:04 |
| 2 | Makoto Oishi | DDT | 2 | Multiple wrestlers | Pinfall | 11:31 |
| 3 | Yuya Koroku | DDT | 5 | Yuji Hino | Pinfall | 13:06 |
| 4 | Kazuki Hirata | DDT | 7 | Akitoshi Saito | Pinfall | 16:31 |
| 5 (Note: All four members of Funky Express entered together.) | Muhammad Yone | Noah | 12 | Toru Owashi | Pinfall | 19:27 |
| 5 | Shuhei Taniguchi | Noah | 9 | Muhammad Yone & Toru Owashi | Over the top rope | 17:11 |
| 5 | Akitoshi Saito | Noah | 10 | Masao Inoue | Over the top rope | 17:53 |
| 5 | Masao Inoue | Noah | 14 | Antonio Honda | Pinfall | 22:31 |
| 6 | Saki Akai | DDT | 11 | Muhammad Yone | Pinfall | 18:51 |
| 7 | Toru Owashi | Freelancer | 13 | Antonio Honda & Masao Inoue | Pinfall | 19:32 |
| 8 | Yusuke Okada | DDT | 3 | Multiple wrestlers | Pinfall | 11:31 |
| 9 | Shu Sakurai | GanPro | 4 | Shuhei Taniguchi | Pinfall | 12:57 |
| 10 | Yuna Manase | GanPro | 1 | Yuji Hino | Over the top rope | 11:11 |
| 11 | Yuji Hino | Freelancer | 8 | Muhammad Yone & Toru Owashi | Over the top rope | 17:11 |
| 12 | Antonio Honda | Freelancer | – | Winner | – | – |
