= Into The Fight 2024 =

2024 DDT Pro-Wrestling event

- Promotional poster featuring debuting Kaisei Takechi
- Promotion: CyberFight
- Brand: DDT Pro-Wrestling
- Date: February 25, 2024
- City: Tokyo, Japan
- Venue: Korakuen Hall
- Attendance: 1,600
- Tagline: The Rampage

Event chronology
← Previous; Sweet Dreams! 2024	Next → Judgement 2024

Into The Fight chronology
← Previous; 2023	Next → —

Into The Fight 2024 was a professional wrestling event promoted by DDT Pro-Wrestling (DDT). It took place on February 25, 2024, in Tokyo, Japan, at Korakuen Hall. The event aired live on Fighting TV Samurai and on DDT's streaming service Wrestle Universe.

Seven matches were contested at the event, including two on the pre-show. The main event saw The37Kamiina (Shunma Katsumata and Yuki Ueno) and the debuting Kaisei Takechi defeat Hideki Okatani, Takeshi Masada and Tetsuya Endo. In another prominent match, Mao defeated Hikaru Machida to retain the DDT Universal Championship.

== Background ==
Into The Fight is an event held each year since 2005 (except in 2006 and 2022) at Korakuen Hall (except the 2015 edition which was held at Shinjuku Face). The 2024 edition was the eighteenth event under that name.

=== Storylines ===
The show featured nine professional wrestling matches that resulted from scripted storylines, where wrestlers portrayed villains, heroes, or less distinguishable characters in the scripted events that built tension and culminated in a wrestling match or series of matches.

== Event ==
The event started with two bouts broadcast live on DDT's YouTube channel. In the first one, Antonio Honda, Chris Brookes and Masahiro Takanashi picked up a victory over Illusion, Yuki Iino and Yuni in six-man tag team action and in the second one, Daisuke Sasaki and Kanon outmatched Akito and Soma Takao. Zack Sabre Jr. showed up and accepted an invitation he received from Chris Brookes to team up and face Yuki Ueno and Mao in a match scheduled for April 7, 2024.

In the first main card match, Kazuki Hirata, Naruki Doi and Shinya Aoki defeated one third of the KO-D 6-Man Tag Team Champions Danshoku Dino, Makoto Oishi and Toru Owashi in six-man tag team action. Next up, To-y defeated MJ Paul in singles competition. In the fifth match, Kazusada Higuchi and Yoshitatsu defeated Rukiya and Yukio Naya in tag team competition. Next up, Mao defeated Hikaru Machida to secure the fifth consecutive defense of the DDT Universal Championship in that respective reign. After the bout concluded, Takeshi Masada laid a title challenge which was scheduled to take place at Judgement 2024 on March 17.

In the main event, DDT Extreme Champion Shunma Katsumata, KO-D Openweight Champion Yuki Ueno and the debuting Exile Tribe performer Kaisei Takechi defeated Hideki Okatani, Takeshi Masada and one half of the KO-D Tag Team Champions Tetsuya Endo in six-man tag team competition.

== Results ==
No.	Results	Stipulations	Times
1^{P}	Schadenfreude International (Antonio Honda, Chris Brookes and Masahiro Takanashi) defeated Ilusion, Yuki Iino and Yuni by pinfall	Six-man tag team match	8:48
2^{P}	Damnation T.A. (Daisuke Sasaki and Kanon) defeated Akito and Soma Takao by pinfall	Tag team match	8:24
3	Zuncha Muscle Survivor (Kazuki Hirata, Naruki Doi and Shinya Aoki) defeated Danshoku Dino, Makoto Oishi and Toru Owashi by pinfall	Six-man tag team match	9:05
4	To-y defeated MJ Paul by pinfall	Singles match	7:12
5	Kazusada Higuchi and Yoshitatsu defeated Rukiya and Yukio Naya by pinfall	Tag team match	10:58
6	Mao (c) defeated Hikaru Machida by pinfall	Singles match for the DDT Universal Championship	14:27
7	The37Kamiina (Shunma Katsumata and Yuki Ueno) and Kaisei Takechi defeated Hideki Okatani, Takeshi Masada and Tetsuya Endo by pinfall	Six-man tag team match	20:19
(c) / – the champion(s) heading into the match; P / – the match was broadcast on the pre-show
