= Wrestle Peter Pan 2022 =

2022 DDT Pro-Wrestling event

- Promotional poster featuring Kazusada Higuchi
- Promotion: CyberFight
- Brand: DDT
- Date: August 20, 2022
- City: Tokyo, Japan
- Venue: Ota City General Gymnasium
- Attendance: 1,250
- Tagline: DDT does not shy away from "strength". (Note: Japanese: ＤＤＴは〝強さ〟から逃げない。, Hepburn: DDT wa "tsuyosa" kara nigenai.)

Pay-per-view chronology
← Previous; Judgment 2022	Next → Never Mind 2022

Peter Pan chronology
← Previous; 2021	Next → 2023

Wrestle Peter Pan 2022 was a professional wrestling event promoted by CyberFight's sub-brand DDT Pro-Wrestling (DDT). It took place on August 20, 2022, in Tokyo, Japan, at the Ota City General Gymnasium. The event aired on CyberAgent's AbemaTV online linear television service and CyberFight's streaming service Wrestle Universe. This was the fourteenth event in the Peter Pan series and the fourth promoted under the "Wrestle Peter Pan" name.

The event featured nine matches with three of DDT's nine championships on the line. In the main event, Kazusada Higuchi defeated Tetsuya Endo to retain the KO-D Openweight Championship. Other prominent matches saw Yuki Ueno defeat Masahiro Takanashi to win the DDT Universal Championship, and Joey Janela defeated Shunma Katsumata in a Hardcore match to retain the DDT Extreme Championship.

== Production ==
=== Background ===
Since 2009, DDT began annually producing shows in the Ryōgoku Kokugikan held in the summer, following the promotions financial success of the first event. This led to the event becoming DDT's premier annual event and one of the biggest event on the independent circuit of Japanese wrestling. Since 2019, the event was renamed "Wrestle Peter Pan".

=== Storylines ===
The event featured nine professional wrestling matches that resulted from scripted storylines, where wrestlers portrayed villains, heroes, or less distinguishable characters in the scripted events that built tension and culminated in a wrestling match or series of matches.

=== Event ===
The show portraited three title matches, one of them marking a title change. The first one saw Joey Janela retaining the DDT Extreme Championship against Shunma Katsumata to secure his fourth consecutive defense. Yuki Ueno succeeded in winning the DDT Universal Championship for the second time in his career after defeating Masahiro Takanashi. The main event saw Kazusada Higuchi defending the KO-D Openweight Championship for the first time against Tetsuya Endo who relinquished the title one month earlier due to injury, with this being considered his rightful rematch.

== Results ==
No.	Results	Stipulations	Times
1	Burning (Yusuke Okada and Yuya Koroku) and Ilusion defeated Toui Kojima, Yuki Ishida and Takeshi Masada by pinfall	Six-man tag team match	9:11
2	Pheromones (Yuki "Sexy" Iino, Danshoku "Dandy" Dino and Koju "Shiningball" Takeda) (with Yumehito "Fantastic" Imanari) defeated Yuji Hino, Yukio Naya and Super Sasadango Machine and Disaster Box (Toru Owashi and Kazuki Hirata) and Antonio Honda by pinfall	Three-way match	12:18
3	Harashima and Eruption (Yukio Sakaguchi and Hideki Okatani) defeated Naomi Yoshimura, Kota Umeda and Keisuke Okuda by pinfall	Six-man tag team match	12:44
4	Osamu Nishimura, Makoto Oishi and Akito defeated Shinichiro Kawamatsu, Sanshiro Takagi and Soma Takao by pinfall	Six-man tag team match	14:47
5	Jun Akiyama and Saki Akai defeated Chris Brookes and Asuka by pinfall	Mixed tag team match	15:21
6	Joey Janela (c) defeated Shunma Katsumata by pinfall	Hardcore match for the DDT Extreme Championship	18:56
7	Yuki Ueno defeated Masahiro Takanashi (c) by pinfall	Singles match for the DDT Universal Championship	14:26
8	The 37Kamiina (Konosuke Takeshita and Mao) and Yasu Urano defeated Dick Togo and Damnation T.A (Daisuke Sasaki and Kanon) (with MJ Paul) by pinfall	Six-man tag team match	20:41
9	Kazusada Higuchi (c) defeated Tetsuya Endo by pinfall	Singles match for the KO-D Openweight Championship	25:24
(c) / – the champion(s) heading into the match
