= Wrestle Peter Pan 2021 =

2021 DDT Pro-Wrestling event

- Promotional poster featuring various wrestlers
- Promotion: CyberFight
- Brand: DDT
- Date: August 21, 2021
- City: Kawasaki, Kanagawa, Japan
- Venue: Fujitsu Stadium Kawasaki
- Attendance: 1,336
- Tagline: This is DDT's pro-wrestling!

Pay-per-view chronology
← Previous; Judgment 2021	Next → Never Mind 2021

Peter Pan chronology
← Previous; 2020	Next → 2022

Wrestle Peter Pan 2021 was a professional wrestling event promoted by CyberFight's sub-brand DDT Pro-Wrestling (DDT). It took place on August 21, 2021, in Kawasaki, Japan, at the Fujitsu Stadium Kawasaki. The event aired live on CyberAgent's AbemaTV online linear television service and CyberFight's streaming service Wrestle Universe. This was the thirteenth event in the Peter Pan series and the third promoted under the "Wrestle Peter Pan" name. This edition was also the first to take place outside of Tokyo.

The event featured twelve matches. In the main event, Konosuke Takeshita defeated Jun Akiyama to win the KO-D Openweight Championship. Other prominent matches saw Daisuke Sasaki defeat Yuki Ueno to win the DDT Universal Championship, Chris Brookes and Jun Kasai defeat Shunma Katsumata and Mao in a hardcore match and the debuts of 18-year old Ilusion and 13-year old El Unicorn.

== Production ==
=== Background ===
Since 2009, DDT began annually producing shows in the Ryōgoku Kokugikan held in the summer, following the promotions financial success of the first event. This led to the event becoming DDT's premier annual event and one of the biggest event on the independent circuit of Japanese wrestling. Since 2019, the event was renamed "Wrestle Peter Pan".

Wrestle Peter Pan 2021 was officially announced on March 28, 2021 with the event taking place at the Fujitsu Stadium Kawasaki on August 21, 2021. The venue is a 6,000-seat high school football stadium built on the site of the Kawasaki Stadium used by Frontier Martial-Arts Wrestling (FMW) for its annual Anniversary Show from 1991 to 2001. The event aired live worldwide on CyberFight's streaming service Wrestle Universe.

==== Impact of the COVID-19 pandemic ====
As a result of the COVID-19 pandemic, other wrestling promotions began to cancel or postpone their shows in an attempt to prevent further spreading of the SARS-CoV-2 virus. At the end of February 2020, DDT began holding shows with no audience and only essential staff present. DDT's sister promotion Pro Wrestling Noah began holding shows behind closed doors in an empty TV studio under the "NOAH TV" name, with the shows being streamed on Wrestle Universe. The 2020 Wrestle Peter Pan event was originally to take place at the Saitama Super Arena in Saitama solely on June 7, 2020, but in May, DDT began relocating their production to the Shinjuku Face. On April 23, DDT announced that the 2020 Wrestle Peter Pan would be postponed, due to the pandemic, following Japan's State of Emergency declaration, then, on May 16, the event was rescheduled to take place on June 6 and June 7, with the event being moved to the DDT TV Show Studio in Tokyo, without an audience.

=== Storylines ===
The event featured professional wrestling matches that resulted from scripted storylines, where wrestlers portrayed villains, heroes, or less distinguishable characters in the scripted events that built tension and culminated in a wrestling match or series of matches.

In December 2020, comedian Kuro-chan pinned FMW founder Atsushi Onita in an Electric Current Explosion Deathmatch. As a throwback to the days when FMW held its anniversary shows at the Kawasaki Stadium, Sanshiro Takagi booked a similar bout to serve as a rematch between the two. On June 7, 2021, DDT announced that the event would include two rings; one for an Explosion Deathmatch that would feature Onita, and one for the remaining matches. It was also announced that Tamura and Raimu Imai from Pro Wrestling Heat-Up would be taking part in the show.

On July 15, DDT unveiled the DDT Teenage Project, a talent scouting program designed to lay the foundation of an upcoming new DDT sub-brand. The first two trainees from the project, 13-year-old El Unicorn (who had already wrestled for DDT under the name Yuni) and 18-year-old Ilusion, were set to make their debut in a ten-man tag team match.

On June 10, 2021, Daisuke Sasaki defeated the DDT Universal Champion Yuki Ueno in the first round of the 2021 King of DDT tournament after hitting him with a low blow. In the following weeks, Sasaki kept scoring cheap wins over Ueno using the same tactics. After their match at Summer Vacation 2021 Tour in Shinjuku, Ueno challenged Sasaki to a Universal title match at Wrestle Peter Pan in the hopes of having a fair match.

On July 4, Konosuke Takeshita defeated Yuji Hino in the final of the 2021 King of DDT tournament, earning the right to a KO-D Openweight Championship match against Jun Akiyama.

== Event ==
Other on-screen personnel
Role:	Name:
Commentators	Haruo Murata
Commentators	Sayoko Mita
Commentators	Kagehiro Osano
Commentators	Sumire Uesaka (guest)
Commentators	Kenta Kobashi (Akiyama vs. Takeshita)
Ring announcer	Inoue Mic
Referees	Daisuke Kiso
Referees	Yukinori Matsui
Referees	Hisaya Imabayashi (Double Ring re-rematch)

=== Pre-show ===
Two matches were contested on the pre-show which aired live on DDT's YouTube channel. The first match pitted Yukio Naya and Keigo Nakamura against Hideki Okatani and Yuya Koroku. In the end, Naya performed a chokeslam on Koroku to win the match.

Next was an Electric Current Explosion eight-person Deathmatch in which Atsushi Onita, Sanshiro Takagi, Akito and Maki Itoh faced Kuro-chan, Super Sasadango Machine, Tetsuhiro Kuroda and Hikari Noa. In this match, several baseball bats wrapped in barbed wire laced with explosives and hooked to electrical cords were placed in the ring. A button attached to the top turnbuckle of a neutral corner could be pressed to temporarily activate the bats so that they would explode when hitting something by shorting the circuit thus triggering the explosives. Throughout the match, Kuro-chan taunted Onita while trying to evade him. In the closing moments, Itoh and Noa found themselves in a standoff with each holding a blast bat. They swung at each other, which caused a big explosion, and left the ring to recover. Kuro-chan and Onita found themselves standing alone for their respective team. Finally, Onita hit Kuro-chan with a blast bat to win the match.

=== Preliminary matches ===
The actual event opened with Kenta Kobashi welcoming the crowd.

The opening match was a ten-man tag team match that saw the debuts of DDT Teenage Project rookies El Unicorn and Ilusion. Unicorn teamed with Harashima, Naomi Yoshimura, Yusuke Okada and Raimu Imai; Ilusion teamed with Yuji Okabayashi, Tamura, Mizuki Watase and Yuki Iino. During the match, while the other eight men were locked in a multi-man suplex struggle, Unicorn and Ilusion climbed on top of them, using their backs as a platform from which Ilusion performed a brainbuster on Unicorn. After Ilusion's teammates won the suplex struggle, Watase joined him in a stereo topé con giro to the outside. Unicorn got back up and performed a "Dragonrana" on Ilusion to pin him but Ilusion kicked out. Unicorn countered a powerbomb attempt into a double knee stomp to win the match.

Next was the Double Ring Double Singles match. Toru Owashi faced Antonio Honda in one ring while Danshoku Dino faced Kazuki Hirata in a second ring. Honda and Dino made their entrance simultaneously with their entrance musics overlapping, then same went for Owashi and Hirata. Both matches ended in eleven seconds when Owashi pinned Honda at the same when Dino pinned Hirata. General Manager Hisaya Imabayshi, unable to announce the official results of the matches as he couldn't watch both rings at once, demanded the matches be restarted in the same ring. Referees Daisuke Kiso and Yukinori Matsui got in each other's way several times and started to fight. The rematches ended in a no contest decision in under two minutes and Imabayashi turned the match into a six-man tag team match in which Owashi, Honda and Kiso faced Dino, Hirata and Matsui while Imabayashi himself refereed. Dino, Hirata and Matsui isolated Kiso and put him in the "Kaientai Deluxe" hold. Dino then attempted to submit Kiso by French kissing him. In the end, Kiso reversed Matsui's brainbuster attempt into a small package to win the match.

In the following match, The37Kamiina (Shunma Katsumata and Mao) faced Chris Brookes and Jun Kasai in a hardcore match. Katsumata and Mao filled the ring with broken plastic cases and Lego blocks. Katsumata removed his boots to wrestle barefoot and challenged Kasai to do so himself. Because he was taking too much time to remove his boot, Katsumata attacked Kasai with a moonsault double foot stomp from the top turnbuckle but Kasai rolled out and Katsumata landed bare feet on the Lego blocks. Mao and Katsumata stuck wooden skewers in Kasai and Brookes' heads. Katsumata attempted a dive on Kasai, but kasai blocked using a knife. He then performed a "Reverse Tiger Driver" while Brookes hit Mao with the "Praying Mantis Bomb" on the Lego blocks to win the match.

Next, Damnation (Tetsuya Endo, Soma Takao and Yuji Hino) defended the KO-D 6-Man Tag Team Championship against Eruption (Kazusada Higuchi, Yukio Sakaguchi and Saki Akai). Early on, Akai called out Hino demanding he respected her and chopped her. Hino easily overpowered Akai and attempted to pin her, but Akai was saved by her partners. In the end, Endo performed a springboard shooting star press on Sakaguchi, Higuchi, and Takao on the outside. Hino and Akai were left alone in the ring. Akai hit Hino with a flurry of chops and kicks, then Hino retaliated with a chop of his own that sent Akai down on the mat. Akai fought back until Hino performed the "Fuckin' Bomb" to win the match and retain the title. This was Takao's thirteenth win in his Peter Pan winning streak.

In the penultimate match, Yuki Ueno defended the DDT Universal Championship against Daisuke Sasaki (accompanied by Mad Paulie). During the match, Sasaki hit Ueno with the title belt, causing Ueno to bleed profusely. Later on, Ueno hit Sasaki with a Shining Wizard and attempted to pin him but Mad Paulie intervened and pulled the referee out of the ring before he could count to three. Ueno hit Paulie with a dropkick and moonsaulted onto both him and Sasaki outside of the ring. In the closing moments, Sasaki countered Ueno's "WR" into "La Mística" transitioned into the "Crossover Facelock". Ueno passed out and Sasaki was awarded the win and the title.

=== Main event ===
In the main event of the evening, Jun Akiyama defended the KO-D Openweight Championship against Konosuke Takeshita. After a back and forth battle in which Akiyama made extensive use of Exploder suplexes while Takeshita hit numerous German suplexes, both attempted to lock in their respective finishing submission holds. In the end, Takeshita removed his knee pad to hit Akiyama with a succession of "Zahi Knee" strikes. He then performed a cross-arm German suplex followed by a "Modified Chickenwing Facelock" that made Akiyama tap out.

After the match, Chris Brookes challenged Takeshita to a title match on the September 26 show scheduled for Korakuen Hall.

== Results ==
No.	Results	Stipulations	Times
1^{P}	Yukio Naya and Keigo Nakamura defeated Hideki Okatani and Yuya Koroku by pinfall	Tag team match	10:38
2^{P}	Atsushi Onita, Sanshiro Takagi, Akito and Maki Itoh defeated Kuro-chan, Super Sasadango Machine, Tetsuhiro Kuroda and Hikari Noa by pinfall	Electric Current Explosion eight-person Deathmatch	9:35
3	Disaster Box (Harashima and Naomi Yoshimura), Yusuke Okada, Raimu Imai and El Unicorn defeated Yuji Okabayashi, Tamura, Mizuki Watase, Yuki Iino and Ilusion by pinfall	Ten-man tag team match	11:44
4	Toru Owashi defeated Antonio Honda by pinfall	Double Ring Double Singles match (Note: Both matches took place simultaneously in two different rings.)	0:11
5	Danshoku Dino defeated Kazuki Hirata by pinfall	Double Ring Double Singles match	0:11
6	Toru Owashi vs. Antonio Honda ended in a no contest	Double Ring Double Singles rematch (Note: Both matches took place simultaneously in the same ring.)	1:28
7	Danshoku Dino vs. Kazuki Hirata ended in a no contest	Double Ring Double Singles rematch	1:28
8	Toru Owashi, Antonio Honda and Daisuke Kiso defeated Danshoku Dino, Kazuki Hirata and Yukinori Matsui by pinfall	Double Ring Double Singles six-man tag team re-rematch (Note: The double match was restarted a second time as a regular six-man tag team bout.)	2:53
9	Chris Brookes and Jun Kasai defeated The 37Kamiina (Shunma Katsumata and Mao) by pinfall	Hardcore tag team match	14:03
10	Damnation (Tetsuya Endo, Soma Takao and Yuji Hino) (c) defeated Eruption (Kazusada Higuchi, Yukio Sakaguchi and Saki Akai) by pinfall	Six-person tag team match for the KO-D 6-Man Tag Team Championship	11:34
11	Daisuke Sasaki (with Mad Paulie) defeated Yuki Ueno (c) by technical knockout	Singles match for the DDT Universal Championship	17:10
12	Konosuke Takeshita defeated Jun Akiyama (c) by submission	Singles match for the KO-D Openweight Championship	24:43
(c) / – the champion(s) heading into the match; P / – the match was broadcast on the pre-show
