= God Bless DDT 2024 =

2024 DDT Pro-Wrestling event

- Promotional poster featuring Shinya Aoki and Harashima
- Promotion: CyberFight
- Brand: DDT
- Date: October 20, 2024
- City: Tokyo, Japan
- Venue: Korakuen Hall
- Attendance: 1,124

Pay-per-view chronology
← Previous; Dramatic Infinity 2024	Next → Ultimate Party 2024

God Bless DDT chronology
← Previous; 2023	Next → —

God Bless DDT 2024 was a professional wrestling event promoted by CyberFight's sub-brand DDT Pro-Wrestling (DDT). It took place on October 20, 2024, in Tokyo, Japan, at the Korakuen Hall. The event aired on CyberFight's streaming service Wrestle Universe.

Eight matches were contested at the event. In an impromptu main event, Shinya Aoki defeated Shunma Katsumata (who cashed in his Right To Challenge Anytime Anywhere contract) to retain the KO-D Openweight Championship, after successfully defending the title against Harashima in the previous bout.

== Background ==
The event featured professional wrestling matches that resulted from scripted storylines, where wrestlers portrayed villains, heroes, or less distinguishable characters in the scripted events that built tension and culminated in a wrestling match or series of matches.

== Event ==
=== Preliminary matches ===
The event began with an eight-man tag team confrontation between the team of Keigo Nakamura, Soma Takao, Yukio Naya and Yuya Koroku and the team of Mao, Shunma Katsumata, To-y and Yuki Ueno, with the latter winning. As a result, Katsumata won Takao's Right To Challenge Anytime Anywhere contract. Next, Kazuma Sumi and Yuni defeated Kazuki Hirata and Super Sasadango Machine. Yuni pinned Hirata, who was the Ironman Heavymetalweight Champion at the time, to win the title. In the third match, Damnation T.A. (Daisuke Sasaki, MJ Paul, Kanon and Ilusion) defeated Schadenfreude International (Antonio Honda, Chris Brookes, Masahiro Takanashi and Takeshi Masada) in an eight-man tag team bout. Next, Tetsuya Endo and Yuki Iino defeated Jun Akiyama and Yuki Ishida. Next, Mao cashed in his Right to Challenge Anytime Anywhere contract and defeated Yuki Iino to win the DDT Universal Championship for a then-record third time, ending Iino's reign at 42 days and two defenses. Next up, Danshoku Dino defeated Akito in a nobodyknows+ rules match to win the DDT Extreme Championship. Akito lost by speaking English, as that was the hidden rule of the match that was randomly drawn by the referee. After the match concluded, Yuni presented himself as the next challenger for the DDT Extreme title, but Dino quickly pinned him to win the Ironman Heavymetalweight Championship.

=== Main event ===
In the main event, Shinya Aoki successfully defended the KO-D Openweight Championship twice, first against lineal challenger Harashima, and then against Shunma Katsumata who cashed in his Right To Challenge Anytime Anywhere contract.

== Results ==
No.	Results	Stipulations	Times
1	The37Kamiina (Mao, Shunma Katsumata, To-y and Yuki Ueno) defeated Keigo Nakamura, Soma Takao, Yukio Naya and Yuya Koroku by pinfall	Eight-man tag team match As a result, Katsumata won Takao's Right To Challenge Anytime Anywhere contract.	10:42
2	Kazuma Sumi and Yuni defeated Kazuki Hirata and Super Sasadango Machine by pinfall	Tag team match As a result, Yuni won the Ironman Heavymetalweight Championship.	10:53
3	Damnation T.A. (Daisuke Sasaki, MJ Paul, Kanon and Ilusion) defeated Schadenfreude International (Antonio Honda, Chris Brookes, Masahiro Takanashi and Takeshi Masada) by pinfall	Eight-man tag team match	12:35
4	Burning (Tetsuya Endo and Yuki Iino) defeated Jun Akiyama and Yuki Ishida by pinfall	Tag team match	8:56
5	Mao defeated Yuki Iino (c) by pinfall	Singles match for the DDT Universal Championship; This was Mao's Right To Challenge Anytime Anywhere cash-in match.	5:24
6	Danshoku Dino defeated Akito (c)	nobodyknows+ rules match for the DDT Extreme Championship	12:26
7	Shinya Aoki (c) defeated Harashima by pinfall	Singles match for the KO-D Openweight Championship	14:07
8	Shinya Aoki (c) defeated Shunma Katsumata by pinfall	Singles match for the KO-D Openweight Championship; This was Katsumata's Right To Challenge Anytime Anywhere cash-in match.	7:56
(c) / – the champion(s) heading into the match
