= Wrestle Peter Pan 2020 =

2020 DDT Pro-Wrestling event

- Promotional poster featuring all the participants
- Promotion: DDT Pro-Wrestling
- Date: June 6–7, 2020
- City: Tokyo, Japan
- Venue: DDT TV Show Studio
- Attendance: 0 (Note: The event was held without a live audience due to the COVID-19 pandemic in Japan.)
- Tagline: First Time Ever For DDT's Annual Wrestle Peter Pan! A 2 Days TV Show!

Pay-per-view chronology
← Previous; Judgment 2020	Next → Ultimate Party 2020

Peter Pan chronology
← Previous; 2019	Next → 2021

Wrestle Peter Pan 2020 was a two-night professional wrestling pay-per-view (PPV) event produced by DDT Pro-Wrestling (DDT). The event took place on June 6 and 7, 2020, at the DDT TV Show Studio, in Tokyo, Japan. It was the 12th DDT Peter Pan show and the 2nd promoted under the Wrestle Peter Pan name; it was also the first time the event was held over two days. The event aired on DDT's video on demand service Wrestle Universe with the second night of the event also airing on AbemaTV.

The event was originally scheduled to take place solely on June 7, 2020, at Saitama Super Arena in Saitama City. In May, DDT programming was relocated to Shinjuku Face in Tokyo due to the COVID-19 pandemic, with no audience and only essential staff present. Taking advantage of the format, two matches — a Last Man Standing match and a "Yoshihiro Sakai CEO Inauguration Match in Niigata" — were filmed off-site in atypical, cinematic style.

== Storylines ==
The Wrestle Peter Pan 2020 event featured sixteen professional wrestling matches that involved different wrestlers from pre-existing scripted feuds and storylines. Wrestlers portrayed villains, heroes, or less distinguishable characters in the scripted events that built tension and culminated in a wrestling match or series of matches.

On May 23, 2020, at DDT TV Show! #4, former Wrestle-1 wrestler Seigo Tachibana appeared at the end of the show and asked to be put in a match. He was given an exhibition bout against rookie Hideki Okatani that ended in a time limit draw. The following week, Tachibana returned to ask DDT General Manager Hisaya Imabayashi for a spot on the DDT roster. A returning Nobuhiro Shimatani appeared and demanded that the spot be given to him instead as he saw himself more deserving. Imabayashi then announced that Tachibana and Shimatani would fight for the spot on night 1.

In 2010, Yoshihiro Sakai, who wrestled for DDT as Muscle Sakai and more recently as Super Sasadango Machine, went into a semi-retirement from professional wrestling (making only a few appearances) in order to focus on his job at Sakai Seiki Co. Ltd, his family's business in Niigata. On June 1, 2020, Sakai was appointed CEO of the company. As celebration, a match between Sakai as his Super Sasadango Machine persona and Pokotan, the yuru-chara mascot of DDT, was made.

In May 2020, Jun Akiyama was scheduled to work for WWE as a guest trainer, but his visit was postponed due to the COVID-19 pandemic. Now available, he appeared on May 9 at DDT TV Show! #2 to announce he was going to be a guest coach for DDT. During the following weeks, Akiyama fought singles and tag team matches alongside younger talents. A tag match was scheduled for Akiyama and Mizuki Watase (whom he had beaten at DDT TV Show! #4) against Akito and Yuki Iino of the All Out stable.

In January 2020, DDT's parent company CyberAgent purchased Pro Wrestling Noah, with DDT's executives taking over Noah's operations. DDT's President Sanshiro Takagi was named the President of Pro Wrestling Noah and Naomichi Marufuji the Vice President. Before the main event of DDT TV Show! #5, Pro Wrestling Noah stable Kongo led by Kenoh made a surprise entrance and demanded to see Takagi as his appointment as President of Noah was bothering them. Takagi answered and ordered Kongo to fight him in a six-man tag team match on night 1. He would later pick his two partners: Kazusada Higuchi who used to wrestle for Pro Wrestling Noah and Tomomitsu Matsunaga who was part of the ring crew for the very first Pro Wrestling Noah show before he became a wrestler.

On March 20, 2020, at Judgement 2020: DDT 23rd Anniversary, Daisuke Sasaki captured the DDT Universal Championship from Chris Brookes. After his second defense against Brookes and Naomi Yoshimura in a three-way match on May 23, Sasaki challenged Shunma Katsumata for the title in a hardcore match. Isami Kodaka made his return to DDT and asked for a shot at the only main DDT title he hadn't won yet, thus making the match a hardcore three-way.

On May 2, before the start of DDT TV Show! #1, Yuki Iino found the All Out locker room covered with notes that said "All Out All Dead" signed by Yoshihiko, a "love doll" treated as an active wrestler and member of the DDT roster. After Yoshihiko caused Konosuke Takeshita to lose a three-way match against Mao and Naomi Yoshimura, it would fight each member of All Out during the following weeks. At DDT TV Show! #5, Yoshihiko teamed with its love doll sibling Akihiro to take on Takeshita and Akito. Takeshita won the match by referee's decision after he ripped Akihiro's arm off. He then announced he wanted a final grudge match against Yoshihiko to be fought under Last Man Standing rules.

== Event ==
=== Night 1 ===
Other on-screen personnel
Role:	Name:
Commentators	Sayoko Mita
Commentators	Haruo Murata
Commentators	Saki Akai (guest)
Commentators	Danshoku Dino (guest)
Ring announcer	Inoue Mic
Referees	Yukinori Matsui
Referees	Daisuke Kiso

==== Preliminary matches ====
The pay-per-view opened with a match for a spot on the DDT roster with Seigo Tachibana taking on Nobuhiro Shimatani. In the end, Shimatani hit Tachibana with the "Counter Strike" to win the match. After the match, General Manager Hisaya Imabayashi told Tachibana he had failed to earn a spot for the second time and he should go home. However, Danshoku Dino came out and helped Tachibana walk back to the locker room.

Next, Hiroshi Yamato and Saori Anou took on a Ganbare☆Pro-Wrestlingteam of Harukaze and the Independent World Junior Heavyweight Champion Keisuke Ishii. Anou pinned Harukaze after a German suplex to win.

In the third match, Damnation (Soma Takao and Mad Paulie) faced Keigo Nakamura and Hideki Okatani. In the end, Takao performed a diving double foot stomp on Okatani to win the match.

Next was the celebration of Muscle Sakai's promotion to CEO of Sakai Seiki Co. Ltd. Pokotan was sent to the Sakai Seiki factory in Niigata to have a match against Super Sasadango Machine. Sasadango had to turn down the match out of fear of exposing the factory to COVID-19 and took the opportunity to use Pokotan as free labour. Pokotan was introduced to Yukako Mito and was invited to take a tour of the factory. Mito showed Pokotan around and explained it how to polish plastic molds. After polishing molds for hours, Pokotan noticed Mito went missing. Looking around, Pokotan discovered a sign on a room that said "Niigata Joshi Pro Wrestling (#njpw)" (a play on the abbreviation of New Japan Pro-Wrestling). Pokotan opened the door and discovered Sasadango training Mito to wrestle cardboard boxes. Sasadango's secret plan to launch a new professional wrestling company having been exposed, it was decided Pokotan would serve as Mito's sparring partner in an impromptu match. Mito made quick work of the mascot and performed a "Beautiful Cross Body" to win.

Afterwards, Jun Akiyama and Mizuki Watase faced All Out (Akito and Yuki Iino). In the end, Watase countered a spear from Iino by jumping over it. However, Iino successfully hit a second spear for a pinfall. After the match, Iino kept taunting Akiyama by performing haka poses. Akiyama responded by showing only disdain.

In the next match, Pro Wrestling Noah stable Kongo (Kenoh, Masa Kitamiya and Haoh, accompanied by Nioh, Manabu Soya and Yoshiki Inamura) faced the team of Sanshiro Takagi, Kazusada Higuchi and Tomomitsu Matsunaga. Kenoh wanted a clean wrestling match but Takagi introduced his patented plastic fly cases and his customized bicycle, the "Dramatic Dream Cycle", as weapons. Despite Takagi's antics, Haoh caught Matsunaga in a "Tornado Clutch" to get a pinfall victory.

Next, Daisuke Sasaki defended the DDT Universal Championship against Isami Kodaka and Shunma Katsumata in a hardcore three-way match. After the use of multiple weapons, including steel chairs, a ladder and toy blocks, Sasaki took Katsumata's toy block covered baseball bat, hit him in the groin with hit and pinned him with a Huracánrana, defending the title for the third time in this reign.

==== Main event ====
In the main event of night 1, Konosuke Takeshita faced Yoshihiko in a Last Man Standing match set at an undisclosed cemetery and building in the Tokyo area. Takeshita was first ambushed by Yoshihiko who put him in a figure-four leglock. Takeshita broke free and ran away. He tried to phone Yuki Iino but Yoshihiko knocked the phone off his hand right after Iino answered the call. Takeshita went to hide in a nearby building where he managed to ambush Yoshihiko. They fought on the roof until Takeshita knocked Yoshihiko over the edge. As Takeshita thought he had won, Yoshihiko appeared behind him with its face covered in blood. It choked Takeshita with a sleeper hold but Takeshita managed to fight out of it and grabbed a tank of gasoline. He then poured gasoline over Yoshihiko but Yoshihiko grabbed the tank in turn and doused Takeshita. Both fought over a lighter until Yoshihiko pulled one of Takeshita's eyeballs out. Takeshita reclaimed it and pushed it back in, visibly with no after-effects. Yoshihiko performed a Canadian destroyer on Takeshita and tried to use the lighter but Takeshita got back up and hit Yoshihiko with a ripcord lariat before setting it ablaze in a giant explosion. Iino finally appeared equipped with baseball bats but the match was over as Takeshita was the last man standing. They left happy to have won their war against Yoshihiko but after credits rolled, the body of Yoshihiko was shown in a post-credit scene fashion. Its eyes began to shine again and the show concluded.

=== Night 2 ===
Other on-screen personnel
Role:	Name:
Commentators	Sayoko Mita
Commentators	Haruo Murata
Commentators	Konosuke Takeshita (guest)
Commentators	Jun Akiyama (guest)
Ring announcer	Inoue Mic
Referees	Yukinori Matsui
Referees	Daisuke Kiso
Referees	Shota (Owashi vs. Honda)

==== Preliminary matches ====
Night 2 opened with Toru Owashi taking on Antonio Honda in a match remotely produced by Super Sasadango Machine. Before the match started, Sasadango delivered a video message to the participants saying he made the match a "Chop Up Challenge" where every chop delivered during the match would amount to a donation of 100 yen in support of medical personnel. Owashi and Honda agreed to fight the match under Falls Count Anywhere rules as well. The action quickly spilled outside of the ring and into the backstage area which caused General Manager Hisaya Imabayashi to start the second match. The broadcast would then regularly check in on this first match as the event continued.

The second match was a Tokyo Joshi Pro Wrestling exhibition match featuring MiraClians (Yuka Sakazaki and Shoko Nakajima) and Miyu Yamashita facing the Bakuretsu Sisters (Nodoka Tenma and Yuki Aino) and Rika Tatsumi. After Yamashita hit Aino with a backspin kick, Sakazaki performed the "Magical Magical Girl Splash" to earn the pinfall victory.

After the match, a segment showed Owashi and Honda chopping each other in a locker room while eating snacks. Still hungry, Owashi suggested they grab dinner. Referee Shota showed the chop counter indicating "313".

Next, Shinya Aoki defended the DDT Extreme Championship against Yukio Naya. To celebrate the lift on Tokyo's outdoor restrictions, the match was fought under No Countout rules. After both men dragged each other around the hallways of the venue while fighting, they found their way back in the ring where Aoki countered a backdrop from Naya into a "European Clutch" for a three count, thus defending the title for the third time in this reign.

Afterwards, Eruption (Yukio Sakaguchi and Saki Akai) faced Chris Brookes and Maki Itoh. In the closing moments, Akai performed her finishing maneuver, the "Quetzalcoatl", on Brookes as he was trying to come to Itoh's rescue. Itoh showed the middle finger to Sakaguchi who then responded by hitting her with a penalty kick before pinning her for the win.

After the match, Owashi and Honda were shown arriving at the Ebisuko Tavern, an izakaya managed and manned by several DDT wrestlers and located in the Kabukichō district. Still chopping each other, they were greeted by Ken Ohka who refused to let them sit inside because of the coronavirus. He gave them take-outs and they dragged him along with them back to the venue without paying for the meal.

Next, Danshoku Dino made his entrance as he was set to defend the Ironman Heavymetalweight Championship against Makoto Oishi. However, after Oishi's entrance theme song played, Dino received a text from Oishi apologizing for being late as he had to tend to his 7-month-old child and promising he was on his way. Because of their limited broadcast time, referee Yukinori Matsui and General Manager Imabayashi were ready to cancel the match but Dino begged them to wait for three minutes. The production changed to a TV drama style and memories of the decade long friendship Dino and Oishi have been sharing played to the tune of Miyuki Nakajima's "Thread" (糸, Ito). As Imabayashi was about to call off the match, the music stopped and Oishi appeared. In his haste, he tripped over the steps leading to the ringside area and fell unconscious to the ground. Referee Matsui went to check on him and deemed him unable to compete thus ruling the match a no contest.

The next match saw Mao and Asuka taking on HarashiMarufuji (Harashima and Naomichi Marufuji). As Asuka attempted a moonsault on Harashima, Harashima countered by getting his knees up. Marufuji hit Mao with a "Tiger King" knee strike and Harashima hit Asuka with the "Somato" to win the match.

After the match, Owashi and Honda were now enjoying their take-out meal in the locker room while holding Ohka captive. Kudo, veteran DDT wrestler and current manager of the Ebisuko Tavern, appeared demanding the money he was owed for the meal. Because the bill amounted to 3,100 yen, Kudo agreed to chop Ohka 31 times, bringing the total number of chops to 1,000. Referee Shota agreed to stop the match there, ruling it as a draw.

In the penultimate match, Nautilus (Yuki Ueno and Naomi Yoshimura) defended the KO-D Tag Team Championship against #StrongHearts (T-Hawk and El Lindaman). The match ended when Ueno hit El Lindaman with a frog splash then with his new finishing maneuver, a modified "Ranhei" dubbed the "WR", to retain the title.

==== Main event ====
In the main event of night 2, Masato Tanaka defended the KO-D Openweight Championship against Tetsuya Endo. Tanaka threw Endo from a top turnbuckle through a table outside of the ring. Endo blocked a diving splash attempt with his knees. Because Tanaka heavily targeted Endo's legs, Endo was unable to perform his handspring overhead kick. Endo missed a shooting star press which gave Tanaka the opportunity to hit him with his "Sliding D". Endo escaped a pin attempt by reaching the ropes then hit Tanaka with a "Package Canadian Destroyer" followed by two shooting star presses to win his second KO-D Openweight title.

== Results ==
Night 1 (June 6)
No.	Results	Stipulations	Times
1	Nobuhiro Shimatani defeated Seigo Tachibana	Singles match	05:40
2	Hiroshi Yamato and Saori Anou defeated Keisuke Ishii and Harukaze	Tag team match	08:57
3	Damnation (Soma Takao and Mad Paulie) defeated Keigo Nakamura and Hideki Okatani	Tag team match	10:22
4	Yukako Mito defeated Pokotan	Singles match	04:18
5	All Out (Akito and Yuki Iino) defeated Jun Akiyama and Mizuki Watase	Tag team match	13:19
6	Kongo (Kenoh, Masa Kitamiya and Haoh) (with Nioh, Manabu Soya and Yoshiki Inamura) defeated Sanshiro Takagi, Kazusada Higuchi and Tomomitsu Matsunaga	Six-man tag team match	19:19
7	Daisuke Sasaki (c) defeated Isami Kodaka and Shunma Katsumata	Hardcore three-way match for the DDT Universal Championship	24:12
8	Konosuke Takeshita defeated Yoshihiko	Last Man Standing match	15:04
(c) / – the champion(s) heading into the match

Night 2 (June 7)
No.	Results	Stipulations	Times
1	Toru Owashi vs. Antonio Honda ended in a draw	Falls Count Anywhere Chop Up Challenge match	1:12:45
2	MiraClians (Yuka Sakazaki and Shoko Nakajima) and Miyu Yamashita defeated Rika Tatsumi and Bakuretsu Sisters (Nodoka Tenma and Yuki Aino)	Six-woman tag team match This was a Tokyo Joshi Pro Wrestling exhibition match.	15:31
3	Shinya Aoki (c) defeated Yukio Naya	No Countout match for the DDT Extreme Championship	10:49
4	Eruption (Yukio Sakaguchi and Saki Akai) defeated Chris Brookes and Maki Itoh	Tag team match	12:01
5	Danshoku Dino (c) vs. Makoto Oishi ended in a no contest	Singles match for the Ironman Heavymetalweight Championship	—
6	HarashiMarufuji (Harashima and Naomichi Marufuji) defeated Mao and Asuka	Tag team match	17:24
7	Nautilus (Yuki Ueno and Naomi Yoshimura) (c) defeated #StrongHearts (T-Hawk and El Lindaman)	Tag team match for the KO-D Tag Team Championship	22:13
8	Tetsuya Endo (with Daisuke Sasaki, Soma Takao and Mad Paulie) defeated Masato Tanaka (c)	Singles match for the KO-D Openweight Championship	26:19
(c) / – the champion(s) heading into the match
