= Wrestle Peter Pan 2023 =

2023 DDT Pro-Wrestling event

- Promotional poster featuring various wrestlers
- Promotion: CyberFight
- Brand: DDT
- Date: July 23, 2023
- City: Tokyo, Japan
- Venue: Ryōgoku Kokugikan
- Attendance: 3,465

Pay-per-view chronology
← Previous; Mega Max Bump 2023	Next → Ultimate Party 2023

Peter Pan chronology
← Previous; 2022	Next → 2024

Wrestle Peter Pan 2023 was a professional wrestling event promoted by CyberFight's sub-brand DDT Pro-Wrestling (DDT). It took place on July 23, 2023, in Tokyo, Japan, at the Ryōgoku Kokugikan. The event aired on CyberFight's streaming service Wrestle Universe. The first three matches aired for free on DDT's YouTube channel. This was the fifteenth event in the Peter Pan series and the fifth promoted under the "Wrestle Peter Pan" name.

Twelve matches were contested at the event. In the main event, Chris Brookes defeated Yuji Hino to win the KO-D Openweight Championship, having won the 2023 King of DDT Tournament to earn the opportunity. In other prominent matches, Matt Cardona defeated Tetsuya Endo to win the DDT Universal Championship, and Eruption (Yukio Sakaguchi, Saki Akai and Hideki Okatani) defeated Harimau (Kazusada Higuchi, Ryota Nakatsu and Yuki Ishida) to win the KO-D 6-Man Tag Team Championship.

== Production ==
=== Background ===
Since 2009, DDT began annually producing shows in the Ryōgoku Kokugikan held in the summer, following the promotions financial success of the first event. This led to the event becoming DDT's premier annual event and one of the biggest event on the independent circuit of Japanese wrestling. Since 2019, the event was renamed "Wrestle Peter Pan".

=== Storylines ===
The event featured twelve professional wrestling matches that resulted from scripted storylines, where wrestlers portrayed villains, heroes, or less distinguishable characters in the scripted events that built tension and culminated in a wrestling match or series of matches.

=== Event ===
==== Preliminary matches ====
In the opening bout, Takeshi Masada picked up a victory over Kazuma Sumi, pinning him after performing the Masada Power Kobu Mukimuki.

Next, Sanshiro Takagi, Shinichiro Kawamatsu and Yuni faced Masahiro Takanashi, Toy Kojima and Rukiya in six-man tag team action. In the end, Kawamatsu hit Rukiya with the Shimatachi Rocket and pinned him for the win.

The next was a three-way six-man tag team match contested under "no touch rules", Damnation T.A (Minoru Fujita, MJ Paul and Kanon) faced Naruki Doi, Toru Owashi and Kazuki Hirata, and Burning (Kotaro Suzuki, Yusuke Okada and Yuya Koroku). In the end, Kanon delivered a Vietnam Driver II to Koroku for the win.

Next, Pheromones (Yuki "Sexy" Iino, Danshoku "Dandy" Dino and Yumehito "Fantastic" Imanari), accompanied by DDT general manager Hisaya Imabayashi (exceptionally joining Pheromones under the name Kachikire Hisaya) faced the team of Akito, Soma Takao and Yoshitomo Shimohigashi, accompanied by YouTube comedian Buchigire Ujihara. In the closing moments, Iino pinned Akito with the Sexy Cannon.

Next up, Chiitan☆ and Pokotan faced Andreza Giant Panda and Super Sasadango Machine in a mascot tag team match. Before the match, Sasadango presented a slide show explaining how his partner Andreza had to eat every 15 minutes in order to remain energized. Later during the match, as Andreza was having the upper hand on Chiitan☆ and Pokotan, he began to weaken and deflate. Sasadango then sacrificed himself by allowing himself to be eaten, which gave Andreza a second wind. However, Chiitan☆ hit Andreza with a shinai, causing him to regurgitate Sasadango. Pokotan and Chiitan☆ then delivered a ChiiPoko☆Trigger to Sasadango and pinned him for the win.

In the next contest, Harimau (Kazusada Higuchi, Ryota Nakatsu and Yuki Ishida) defended the KO-D 6-Man Tag Team Championship against Eruption (Yukio Sakaguchi, Saki Akai and Hideki Okatani). In the end, Okatani delivered a double arm suplex to Ishida to win the title.

Next, Taka Michinoku faced Mao. In the closing moments, Mao performed a Phoenix Splash then pinned Taka Michinoku for the win.

Next, Jun Akiyama and Shigehiro Irie faced Harashima and Yukio Naya in Naya's return match. In the end, Irie hit Naya with the Beast Bomber and pinned him to win the match.

Next, Konosuke Takeshita faced his The37Kamiina stablemate Yuki Ueno in singles competition. Takeshita was billed with his name written in romaji as "KONOSUKE TAKESHITA" instead of the usual kanji writing "竹下幸之介", as a way to reflect his change of character following his excursion to All Elite Wrestling and his affiliation with the Blackpool Combat Club. In the end, Takeshita hit Ueno with the Zehi knee strike and then delivered a brainbuster on the top of the turnbuckle, in a similar fashion to former KO-D Openweight Champion El Generico's Brainbustah!!!, to score a pinfall victory.

Next, Tetsuya Endo defended the DDT Universal Championship against Matt Cardona accompanied by Steph De Lander. Cardona made his entrance wearing several belts, one of which being one of the WWE Women's Tag Team Championship belts which, at that time, belonged to his wife Chelsea Green. In the closing stages, while referee Yukinori Matsui was down on the mat, Cardona attempted to hit Endo with one of his championship belt. Endo ducked and the belt hit De Lander instead. De Lander then shoved Cardona away and gave Endo a kiss, much to his confusion. Then, while Cardona obstructed the view of the referee, De Lander hit Endo with a low blow, allowing Cardona to deliver a Radio Silence and pin Endo to win the DDT Universal Championship.

In the penultimate match, Daisuke Sasaki faced New Japan Pro-Wrestling's El Desperado in a bout sponsored by travel agency Mexico Kankon, with a prize of a year's supply of tequila. In the end, El Desperado submitted Sasaki with the Numero Dos.

==== Main event ====
In the main event, Yuji Hino defended the KO-D Openweight Championship against Chris Brookes, who earned the opportunity after winning the 2023 edition of the King of DDT Tournament. In the end, Brookes delivered the Praying Mantis Bomb to win the match, becoming the fourth non-Japanese wrestler to hold the title.

After Brookes gave a victory speech, thanking the fans and the DDT roster, the show closed with a short backstage segment in which Takeshita was shown coming across an exhausted Sasaki. Sasaki extended his hand and Takeshita accepted the handshake.

== Results ==
No.	Results	Stipulations	Times
1	Takeshi Masada defeated Kazuma Sumi by pinfall	Singles match	6:48
2	Sanshiro Takagi, Shinichiro Kawamatsu and Yuni defeated Masahiro Takanashi, Toy Kojima and Rukiya by pinfall	Six-man tag team match	8:30
3	Damnation T.A (Minoru Fujita, MJ Paul and Kanon) defeated Naruki Doi and Disaster Box (Toru Owashi and Kazuki Hirata), and Burning (Kotaro Suzuki, Yusuke Okada and Yuya Koroku) by pinfall	Three-way six-man tag team match	11:45
4	Pheromones (Yuki "Sexy" Iino, Danshoku "Dandy" Dino and Yumehito "Fantastic" Imanari) (with Kachikire Hisaya) defeated Akito, Soma Takao and Yoshitomo Shimohigashi (with Buchigire Ujihara) by pinfall	Six-man tag team match	9:42
5	Chiitan☆ and Pokotan defeated Andreza Giant Panda and Super Sasadango Machine by pinfall	Tag team match	11:50
6	Eruption (Yukio Sakaguchi, Saki Akai and Hideki Okatani) defeated Harimau (Kazusada Higuchi, Ryota Nakatsu and Yuki Ishida) (c) by pinfall	Six-person tag team match for the KO-D 6-Man Tag Team Championship	9:27
7	Mao defeated Taka Michinoku by pinfall	Singles match	13:11
8	Jun Akiyama and Shigehiro Irie defeated Harashima and Yukio Naya by pinfall	Tag team match	13:25
9	Konosuke Takeshita defeated Yuki Ueno by pinfall	Singles match	12:53
10	Matt Cardona (with Steph De Lander) defeated Tetsuya Endo (c) by pinfall	Singles match for the DDT Universal Championship	15:43
11	El Desperado defeated Daisuke Sasaki by pinfall	Singles match	20:32
12	Chris Brookes defeated Yuji Hino (c)	Singles match for the KO-D Openweight Championship	21:04
(c) / – the champion(s) heading into the match
