= Into The Fight 2020 =

2020 DDT Pro-Wrestling event

- Promotional poster featuring most of the participants
- Promotion: DDT Pro-Wrestling
- Date: February 23, 2020
- City: Tokyo, Japan
- Venue: Korakuen Hall
- Attendance: 1,194

Event chronology
| ← Previous; Ultimate Party 2019 | Next → Judgment 2020 |

Into The Fight chronology
| ← Previous; 2019 | Next → 2021 |

Into The Fight 2020 was a professional wrestling event promoted by DDT Pro-Wrestling (DDT). It took place on February 23, 2020, in Tokyo, Japan, at the Korakuen Hall. The event aired domestically on Fighting TV Samurai and AbemaTV, and globally on DDT Universe, DDT's video-on-demand service.

Seven matches were contested at the event. The main event saw Masato Tanaka defeat Mao to retain the KO-D Openweight Championship. In another prominent match, Chris Brookes defeated Konosuke Takeshita to become the inaugural DDT Universal Champion.

== Storylines ==
Into The Fight 2020 featured seven professional wrestling matches involving wrestlers from pre-existing scripted feuds and storylines. Wrestlers portrayed villains, heroes, or less distinguishable characters in the scripted events that built tension and culminated in a wrestling match or series of matches.

== Event ==
The third match on the card was dubbed "We Are A Family Six-Man Tag Team Match" and featured Danshoku Dino, Super Sasadango Machine, Yasu Urano, Shinya Aoki, Hiroshi Yamato, Kazuki Hirata and referee Yukinori Matsui all wearing Sasadango masks in order to prevent Dino from kissing his opponents amidst the recent coronavirus pandemic. During the matches, the identical masks quickly caused confusion as some participants started tagging in their opponents instead of their partners. After a brawl took all six participants in the hallway surrounding the hall, they re-entered the ring only to realize they were now seven. Everyone started to unmask to confirm their identities. A few seconds after the seventh man, "Someone", unmasked, the lights went out, the wrestlers disappeared and the match was declared invalid.

During the eight-person elimination tag team match, Akito eliminated Daisuke Sasaki with a Schoolboy. Sasaki was the holder of the Right to Challenge at Saitama Super Arena Sword which he had won at Sweet Dreams! 2020, on January 26. The sword granted its holder the right to challenge the KO-D Openweight Champion at Wrestle Peter Pan 2020, at the Saitama Super Arena, on June 7, but it could change hands anytime its holder was defeated in an official match. As a result of that elimination, Akito was declared the new holder of the sword. However, seconds after, Tetsuya Endo submitted Akito to eliminate him, winning both the match and the sword.

Next, British wrestler Chris Brookes won the inaugural DDT Universal Championship by defeating Konosuke Takeshita. This title was created as part of DDT's plans to expand internationally and reach a larger audience. After the match, as Brookes was addressing the fans, Daisuke Sasaki attacked him from behind with a chair and stole the belt.

In the main event, Masato Tanaka successfully defended the KO-D Openweight Championship against Mao before challenging Konosuke Takeshita at a future event.

== Results ==
| No. | Results | Stipulations | Times |
|---|---|---|---|
| 1 | Mad Paulie defeated Yukio Naya and Keigo Nakamura | Three-way match | 02:35 |
| 2 | Eruption (Kazusada Higuchi, Yukio Sakaguchi and Saki Akai) defeated Disaster Box (Toru Owashi and Naomi Yoshimura) and Mizuki Watase | Six-person tag team match | 08:20 |
| 3 | Danshoku Dino, Super Sasadango Machine and Yasu Urano vs. Shinya Aoki, Hiroshi Yamato and Kazuki Hirata ended in a no contest | Six-man tag team match | 08:58 |
| 4 | Cima and Soma Takao (with Mad Paulie) defeated Masahiro Takanashi and Makoto Oishi and Disaster Box (Harashima and Yuki Ueno) | Three-way tag team match | 09:22 |
| 5 | Damnation (Daisuke Sasaki and Tetsuya Endo) and #StrongHearts (T-Hawk and El Lindaman) (with Mad Paulie and Soma Takao) defeated All Out (Akito, Shunma Katsumata and Yuki Iino) and Chihiro Hashimoto | Eight-person elimination tag team match | 15:30 |
| 6 | Chris Brookes defeated Konosuke Takeshita | Singles match for the inaugural DDT Universal Championship | 19:26 |
| 7 | Masato Tanaka (c) defeated Mao | Singles match for the KO-D Openweight Championship | 21:49 |
(c) / – the champion(s) heading into the match

=== Eight-person elimination tag team match ===
| Eliminated | Wrestler | Eliminated by | Method | Time |
|---|---|---|---|---|
| 1 | Shunma Katsumata | El Lindaman | Pinfall | 04:41 |
| 2 | Chihiro Hashimoto | El Lindaman | Over the top rope | 12:09 |
| 3 | El Lindaman | Chihiro Hashimoto | Over the top rope | 12:09 |
| 4 | Yuki Iino | Daisuke Sasaki | Pinfall | 14:04 |
| 5 | Daisuke Sasaki | Akito (Note: Akito won the Right to Challenge at Saitama Super Arena Sword.) | Pinfall | 14:10 |
| 6 | Akito | Tetsuya Endo (Note: Endo won the Right to Challenge at Saitama Super Arena Sword.) | Submission | 15:30 |
| Survivors | Tetsuya Endo and T-Hawk | | | |
