= Judgement 2020: DDT 23rd Anniversary =

2020 DDT Pro-Wrestling event

- Poster for the event featuring various wrestlers
- Promotion: DDT Pro-Wrestling
- Date: March 20, 2020
- City: Tokyo, Japan
- Venue: Korakuen Hall
- Attendance: 916

Event chronology
← Previous; Into The Fight 2020	Next → Peter Pan 2020

Judgement chronology
← Previous; 2019	Next → 2021

Judgement 2020: DDT 23rd Anniversary (Judgement2020〜DDT旗揚げ23周年記念大会〜, Judgement 2020: DDT hataage 23 shūnen kinen taikai) was a professional wrestling event promoted by DDT Pro-Wrestling (DDT). It took place on March 20, 2020, in Tokyo, Japan, at the Korakuen Hall, with a record low attendance of 916 people due in part to the ongoing COVID-19 pandemic at the time. It was the twenty-fourth event under the Judgement name. The event aired domestically on Fighting TV Samurai and globally on DDT's video-on-demand service DDT Universe.

== Storylines ==
Judgement 2020 featured nine professional wrestling matches that involved different wrestlers from pre-existing scripted feuds and storylines. Wrestlers portrayed villains, heroes, or less distinguishable characters in the scripted events that built tension and culminated in a wrestling match or series of matches.

== Event ==
The event saw the Ironman Heavymetalweight Championship change hands during and in between matches. Going into the event, Toru Owashi was the reigning 1,473rd champion but he was pinned by Masahiro Takanashi as he was making his entrance for the battle royal. During the match, Hiroshi Yamato and Owashi simultaneously pinned Takanashi to become co-champions. A few seconds later, Yamato and Owashi were simultaneously pinned by Mizuki Watase, Antonio Honda, Danshoku Dino and Yukio Naya who became the new co-champions. Then, Kazuki Hirata successively pinned Watase, Honda, Naya and finally Dino to win the match and "unify" the title. After the match, Owashi pinned Hirata as he was celebrating his victory to regain the championship as the 1,478th champion.

Just after his match against Eruption, Tetsuya Endo was challenged by Royce Chambers who cashed-in his Right To Challenge Anytime, Anywhere in the hope of winning Endo's Right To Challenge at Saitama Super Arena Sword. Endo won the bout and retained the sword.

The event also saw two singles championship matches as Daisuke Sasaki defeated Chris Brookes to win the newly created DDT Universal Championship, and Masato Tanaka retained the KO-D Openweight Championship against Konosuke Takeshita.

== Results ==
No.	Results	Stipulations	Times
1^{P}	Kazusada Higuchi defeated Jordan Heatley	Singles match	03:50
2	Naomi Yoshimura and Keigo Nakamura defeated Shunma Katsumata and Hideki Okatani	Tag team match	06:01
3	Kazuki Hirata won by last eliminating Danshoku Dino (Note: Order of elimination: Masahiro Takanashi (c), Hiroshi Yamato and Toru Owashi, Mizuki Watase, Yukio Naya, Antonio Honda, Danshoku Dino)	Battle royal for the Ironman Heavymetalweight Championship	07:42
4	Business Alliance (Cima, Soma Takao, Mad Paulie and El Lindaman) defeated Shinya Aoki, Moonlight Express (Mao and Mike Bailey) and Makoto Oishi	Eight-man tag team match	09:24
5	Disaster Box (Harashima, Naomichi Marufuji and Yuki Ueno) defeated All Out (Akito, Yuki Iino and Royce Chambers)	Six-man tag team match	10:33
6	Eruption (Kazusada Higuchi, Yukio Sakaguchi and Saki Akai) defeated Business Alliance (Tetsuya Endo, T-Hawk and Nobuhiro Shimatani)	Six-person tag team match	09:15
7	Tetsuya Endo defeated Royce Chambers	Singles match for Endo's Right To Challenge at Saitama Super Arena Sword; This was Chambers' Right To Challenge Anytime, Anywhere cash-in	04:42
8	Daisuke Sasaki defeated Chris Brookes (c) by submission	Singles match for the DDT Universal Championship	20:35
9	Masato Tanaka (c) defeated Konosuke Takeshita	Singles match for the KO-D Openweight Championship	22:56
(c) / – the champion(s) heading into the match; P / – the match was broadcast on the pre-show
