= DDT Peter Pan =

DDT Pro-Wrestling event series

Peter Pan
- Promotions: DDT Pro-Wrestling
- First event: Ryōgoku Peter Pan (2009)

Peter Pan (ピーターパン, Pītā Pan) is an annual Japanese professional wrestling event promoted by DDT Pro-Wrestling (DDT). The event has been held since 2009 and aired domestically on Fighting TV Samurai and later as an internet pay-per-view (iPPV) on DDT's streaming service Wrestle Universe. Since 2019, the event has aired on AbemaTV. The event is usually held in summer and is DDT's biggest event of the year. Though DDT produced an event titled "Go! Go! Neverland! Peter Pan Summer Vacation" on August 15, 2004, it is not considered a part of the Peter Pan event series.

== Events ==
#	Event	Date	City	Venue	Attendance	Main event	Ref.
1	Ryōgoku Peter Pan	August 23, 2009	Tokyo, Japan	Ryōgoku Kokugikan	8,865	Harashima (c) vs. Kota Ibushi for the KO-D Openweight Championship	
2	Ryōgoku Peter Pan 2010	July 25, 2010	Tokyo, Japan	Ryōgoku Kokugikan	8,800	Daisuke Sekimoto (c) vs. Harashima for the KO-D Openweight Championship	
3	Ryōgoku Peter Pan 2011	July 24, 2011	Tokyo, Japan	Ryōgoku Kokugikan	8,660	Shuji Ishikawa (c) vs. Kudo for the KO-D Openweight Championship	
4	Budokan Peter Pan	August 18, 2012	Tokyo, Japan	Nippon Budokan	10,124	Kota Ibushi (c) vs. Kenny Omega for the KO-D Openweight Championship	
5	Ryōgoku Peter Pan 2013	August 18, 2013	Tokyo, Japan	Ryōgoku Kokugikan	9,000	Shigehiro Irie (c) vs. Harashima for the KO-D Openweight Championship	
6	Ryōgoku Peter Pan 2014	August 17, 2014	Tokyo, Japan	Ryōgoku Kokugikan	9,100	Harashima (c) vs. Isami Kodaka vs. Kenny Omega for the KO-D Openweight Championship	
7	Ryōgoku Peter Pan 2015	August 23, 2015	Tokyo, Japan	Ryōgoku Kokugikan	6,670	Kudo (c) vs. Yukio Sakaguchi for the KO-D Openweight Championship	
8	Ryōgoku Peter Pan 2016	August 28, 2016	Tokyo, Japan	Ryōgoku Kokugikan	5,394	Konosuke Takeshita (c) vs. Shuji Ishikawa for the KO-D Openweight Championship	
9	Ryōgoku Peter Pan 2017	August 20, 2017	Tokyo, Japan	Ryōgoku Kokugikan	5,900	Konosuke Takeshita (c) vs. Tetsuya Endo for the KO-D Openweight Championship	
10	Ryōgoku Peter Pan 2018	October 21, 2018	Tokyo, Japan	Ryōgoku Kokugikan	6,259	Danshoku Dino (c) vs. Daisuke Sasaki for the KO-D Openweight Championship	
11	Wrestle Peter Pan 2019	July 15, 2019	Tokyo, Japan	Ota City General Gymnasium	3,798	Tetsuya Endo (c) vs. Konosuke Takeshita for the KO-D Openweight Championship	
12	Wrestle Peter Pan 2020	June 6, 2020	Tokyo, Japan	DDT TV Show Studio	0 (Note: The event was held without a live audience due to the COVID-19 pandemic in Japan.)	Yoshihiko vs. Konosuke Takeshita in a Last Man Standing match	
12	Wrestle Peter Pan 2020	June 7, 2020	Tokyo, Japan	DDT TV Show Studio	0	Masato Tanaka (c) vs. Tetsuya Endo for the KO-D Openweight Championship	
13	Wrestle Peter Pan 2021	August 21, 2021	Kawasaki, Japan	Fujitsu Stadium Kawasaki	1,336	Jun Akiyama (c) vs. Konosuke Takeshita for the KO-D Openweight Championship	
14	Wrestle Peter Pan 2022	August 20, 2022	Tokyo, Japan	Ota City General Gymnasium	1,250	Kazusada Higuchi (c) vs. Tetsuya Endo for the KO-D Openweight Championship	
15	Wrestle Peter Pan 2023	July 23, 2023	Tokyo, Japan	Ryōgoku Kokugikan	3,465	Yuji Hino (c) vs. Chris Brookes for the KO-D Openweight Championship	
16	Wrestle Peter Pan 2024	July 21, 2024	Tokyo, Japan	Ryōgoku Kokugikan	4,131	Yuki Ueno (c) vs. Mao for the KO-D Openweight Championship	
17	Wrestle Peter Pan 2025	August 30, 2025	Tokyo, Japan	Higashin Arena	N/A	Kazusada Higuchi (c) vs. Jun Akiyama for the KO-D Openweight Championship	
17	Wrestle Peter Pan 2025	August 31, 2025	Tokyo, Japan	Korakuen Hall	N/A	Kazusada Higuchi (c) vs. Yuki Ueno for the KO-D Openweight Championship then Yuki Ueno (c) vs. Kazuki Hirata for the KO-D Openweight Championship in Hirata's Right to Challenge Anytime Anywhere contract cash-in match	
(c) – refers to the champion(s) heading into the match
