= The37Kamiina =

Japanese professional wrestling stable

The 37Kamiina
- Official logo of the stable since 2021

Stable
- Members: See below
- Name: DDT Sauna Club (2020–2021)
- Debut: March 14, 2021
- Years active: 2021–present

The37Kamiina, (Note: Sauna Kamīna (Japanese: The37KAMIINA(サウナカミーナ))) often stylized as The37KAMIINA or The 37KAMIINA (and also known as "Sauna Kamiina"), is a professional wrestling stable currently evolving in the Japanese professional wrestling promotion DDT Pro-Wrestling (DDT) and on the Japanese independent scene. The stable currently consists of Shunma Katsumata, Yuki Ueno and To-y. In Japanese, "37" can be read as "san-na" which sounds like "sauna"; the meaning of "Kamiina" in the members' philosophy lets anyone personally decide about it, with them stating that "It's basically what you want it to be". The stable was formed in late 2020 as the DDT Sauna Club (DDTサウナ部, DDT Sauna-bu), before it officially debuted on March 14, 2021, when the name The37Kamiina was revealed.

== History ==
=== Under Konosuke Takeshita (2021–2023) ===
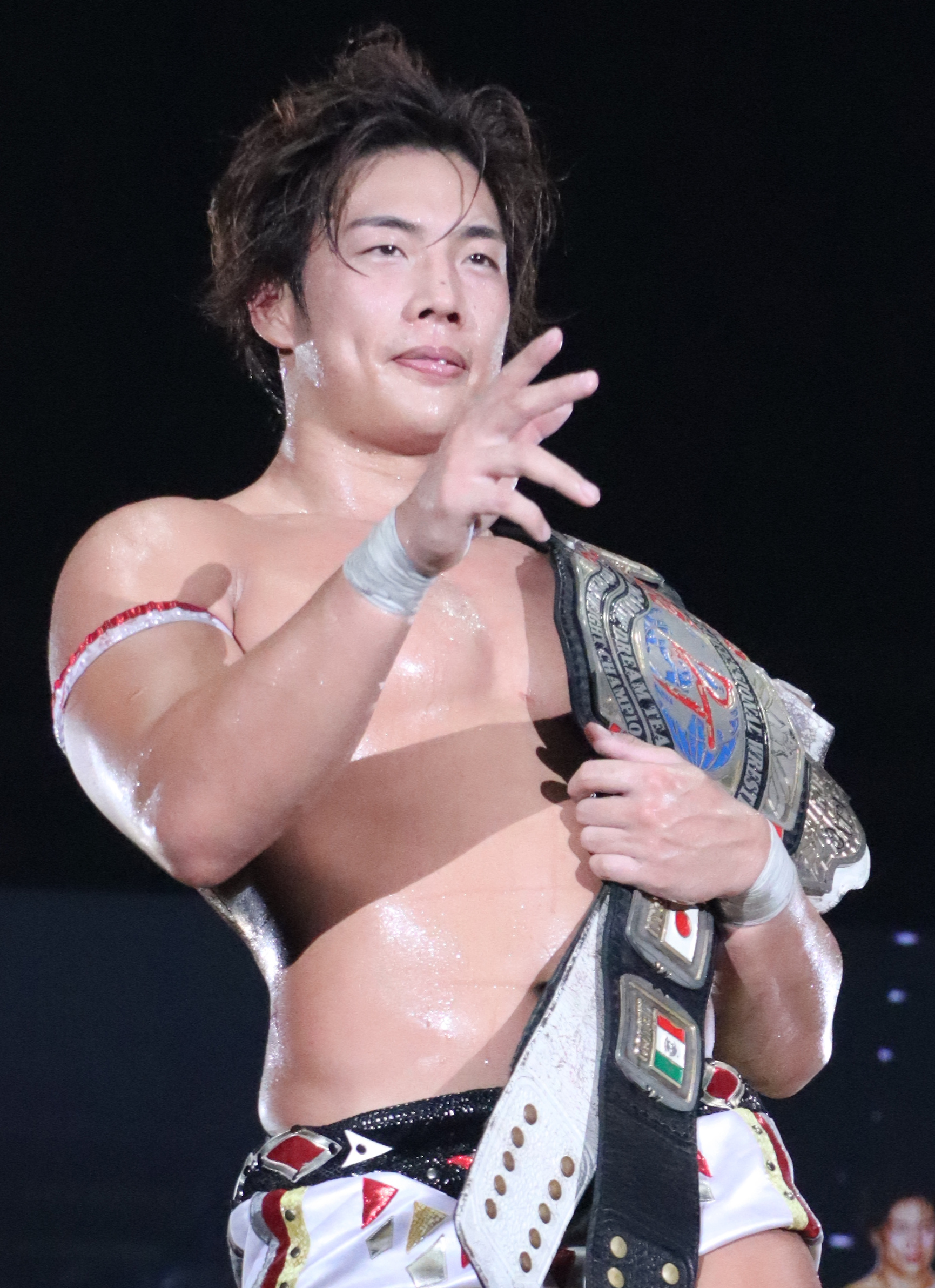
First leader of the stable, Konosuke Takeshita.

On March 12, 2021, former stable All Out had their farewell event before their disbanding. The final members of the unit were Konosuke Takeshita, Shunma Katsumata, Akito and Yuki Iino. The quartet had mutually agreed to go their separate ways earlier in the month, with founding members Takeshita and Akito already involved in different groups within the organisation. One of these groups was the DDT Sauna Club, where Takeshita and Katsumata later aligned themselves with Yuki Ueno and Mao as an official unit, even if their bonds existed since 2020 but without any official declarations. At Into The Fight 2021 the main event was a deathmatch with special rules dubbed the "Kids Room Deathmatch 37 (Sauna) Count Edition" (Note: Kīzu Rūmu Desumatchi Sauna Kaunto Edishon (キーズルームデスマッチ・37（サウナ）カウントエディション)) in which Shunma Katsumata defended the DDT Extreme Division Championship against Mao. Toys such as Lego bricks, a miniature train and kid size furniture were displayed in the ring. The match had no disqualification or rope breaks, every object inside the ring was legal and any weapon introduced by the wrestlers was legal if referee Matsui deemed it "kid safe". The goal of the match was to pin the opponent for a cumulative 37-count. Katsumata convinced referee Matsui that he used to play with cinder blocks as a child in order to drop one on Mao. Both traded 2-count pinfalls in an intense bout that saw its conclusion when Katsumata donned a barbed wire laced apron and climbed the top turnbuckle for a diving splash. Mao rolled out of the way but Katsumata caught him in a cradle to get the 37th count and retain his title.

The stable had their first match as a unit on April 25, 2021, at Max Bump 2021 Tour in Nagano where Mao, Shunma Katsumata and Yuki Ueno fell short to Damnation (Mad Paulie, Daisuke Sasaki and Soma Takao). Konosuke Takeshita and Shunma Katsumata competed in the 2021 edition of the Ultimate Tag League and won it by defeating Damnation (Yuji Hino and Daisuke Sasaki) in the finals after winning the league block with a total of five points which also involved the teams of Junrestu (Jun Akiyama and Makoto Oishi), Eruption (Kazusada Higuchi and Yukio Sakaguchi) and The Iyasarerus (Chris Brookes and Antonio Honda). At CyberFight Festival 2021, a cross-over event promoted by CyberFight for its four brands DDT, Pro Wrestling Noah, Tokyo Joshi Pro-Wrestling and Ganbare Pro-Wrestling on June 6, 2021, Shunma Katsumata and Mao unsuccessfully competed against Damnation (Daisuke Sasaki, Tetsuya Endo and Soma Takao), but Konosuke Takeshita and Yuki Ueno teamed up to successfully triumph over Kaito Kiyomiya and Yoshiki Inamura. At Summer Vacation Tour in Osaka on June 26, 2021, Takeshita and Katsumata defeated Smile Pissari Harashima and Yuji Okabayashi to win the KO-D Tag Team Championship. On the finals of the 2021 King of DDT Tournament from July 4, Mao, Shunma Katsumata and Yuki Ueno defeated Junretsu's Hideki Okatani, Jun Akiyama and Makoto Oishi, and Konosuke Takeshita defeated Yuji Hino in the finals of the tournament. At Summer Vacation Tour 2021 in Shiroishi on July 18, Mao, Shunma Katsumata and Yuki Ueno unsuccessfully challenged Soma Takao, Tetsuya Endo and Yuji Hino for the KO-D 6-Man Tag Team Championship. At Wrestle Peter Pan 2021 on August 21, Shunma Katsumata and Mao fell short to Chris Brookes and Jun Kasai in a hardcore tag team match, Daisuke Sasaki defeated Yuki Ueno by technical knockout to retain the DDT Universal Championship over him, and in the main event, Konosuke Takeshita defeated Jun Akiyama to win the KO-D Openweight Championship. At New Year's Eve Pro-Wrestling 2021, a cross-over event held by DDT in partnership with Big Japan Pro Wrestling and Active Advance Pro Wrestling on December 31, 2021, Takeshita and Mao competed in a one-day Forget The Year! Shuffle Six Man Tag Tournament in which Takeshita teamed up with Kuishinbo Kamen and Yuji Okabayashi as "Powerlifters", and Mao with Shigehiro Irie and Yasufumi Nakanoue as "Ugo Association". Takeshita reached the finals with his tag partners, falling short to Leftovers (Daichi Hashimoto, Harashima and Kengo Mashimo).

At the 2022 edition of the Ultimate Tag League, Mao and Shunma Katsumata fought in the Block B where they scored only two points after competing against the teams of Calamari Drunken Kings (Chris Brookes and Masahiro Takanashi), Damnation T.A (Daisuke Sasaki and MJ Paul), Pheromones (Yuki "Sexy" Iino and Yumehito "Fantastic" Imanari), and Disaster Box (Harashima and Naomi Yoshimura), while in the Block A, Konosuke Takeshita and Yuki Ueno won the competition with a total of six points after going against Burning (Tetsuya Endo and Jun Akiyama), Yuji Hino and Yukio Naya, Eruption (Kazusada Higuchi and Hideki Okatani), and Shuji Kondo and Kazuki Hirata. Unfortunately Takeshita and Ueno fell short to Harashima and Yoshimura in the finals on February 27, 2022, match which was also for the vacant KO-D Tag Team Championship. At Judgement 2022: DDT 25th Anniversary on March 20, Shunma Katsumata and Yuki Ueno defeated Isami Kodaka and Yukio Sakaguchi, Mao defeated Daisuke Sasaki and Jun Kasai in a hardcore match to win the DDT Universal Championship, and Konosuke Takeshita dropped the KO-D Openweight Championship to Tetsuya Endo.

=== All Elite Wrestling and Takeshita departure (2022–present) ===
Due to DDT and All Elite Wrestling (AEW) holding business relationships, the Japanese promotion regularly sends Konosuke Takeshita to compete in the latter promotion. He made his first appearance on the April 8, 2021 episode of AEW Dark: Elevation, where he teamed up with Kenny Omega and Michael Nakazawa to defeat Danny Limelight, Matt Sydal and Mike Sydal in a six-man tag team match. He then appeared at The House Always Wins on April 9, where he teamed with The Young Bucks (Nick Jackson and Matt Jackson), Omega and Nakazawa, falling short to Death Triangle (Pac, Penta El Zero Miedo and Rey Fénix), Matt Sydal and Mike Sydal. After a one-year break, Takeshita announced he would travel to the United States for a tour in AEW. He returned on the April 25, 2022 episode of Dark: Elevation (taped on April 20) where he defeated Brandon Cutler. Takeshita unsuccessfully challenged Jon Moxley for the interim AEW World Championship at AEW Dynmamite #145 on July 13, 2022 On November 19, it was announced that Takeshita had signed with AEW, after his match against Eddie Kingston and Ortiz, while keeping his contract with DDT.

At Double or Nothing on May 28, Takeshita aligned with Don Callis after they attacked Kenny Omega in the final moments of his match against Blackpool Combat Club, turning heel in the process. On July 18, ahead of his singles bout against Yuki Ueno at Wrestle Peter Pan 2023, Takeshita was listed by DDT as a member of The37Kamiina for the last time.

== Members ==
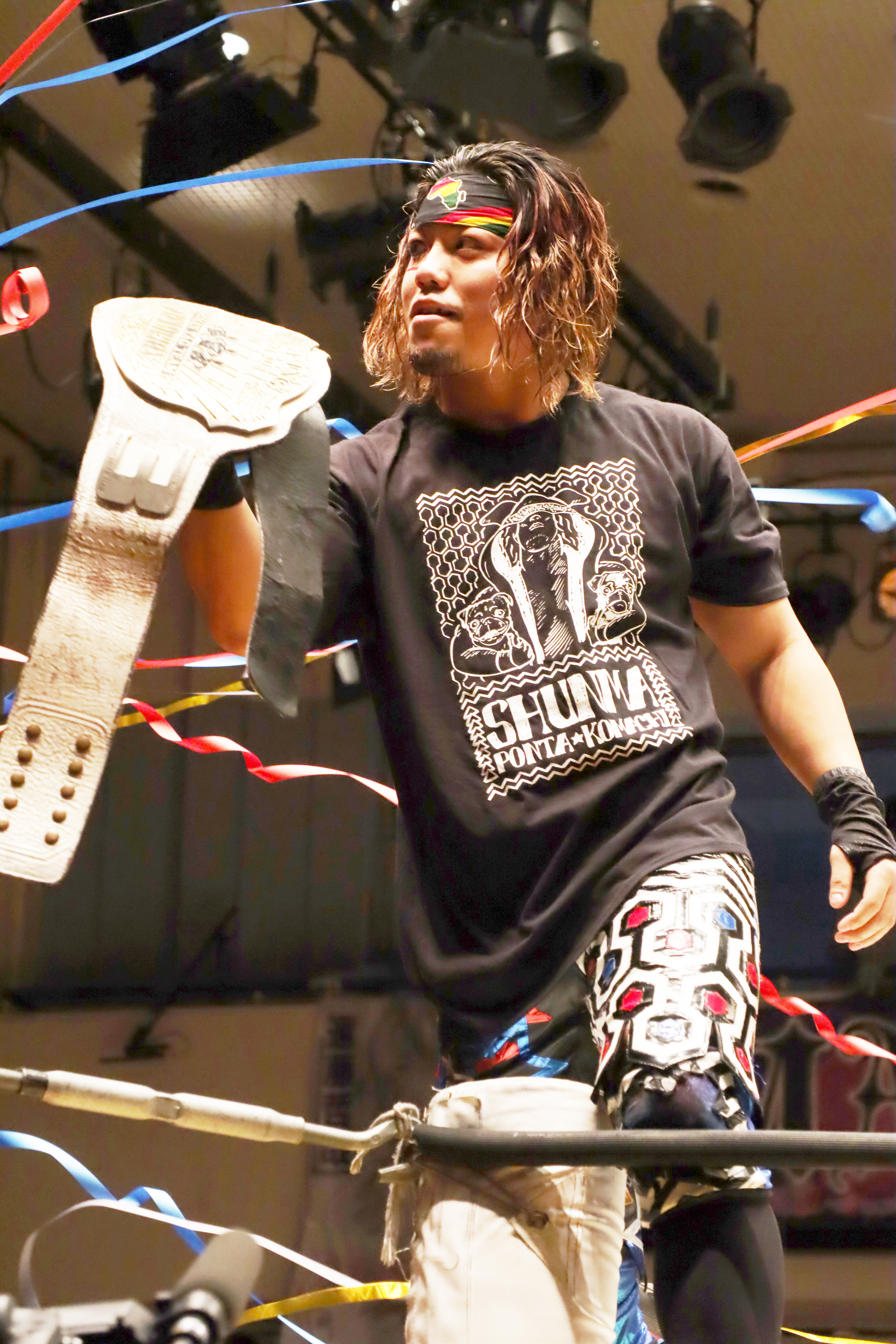
Shunma Katsumata

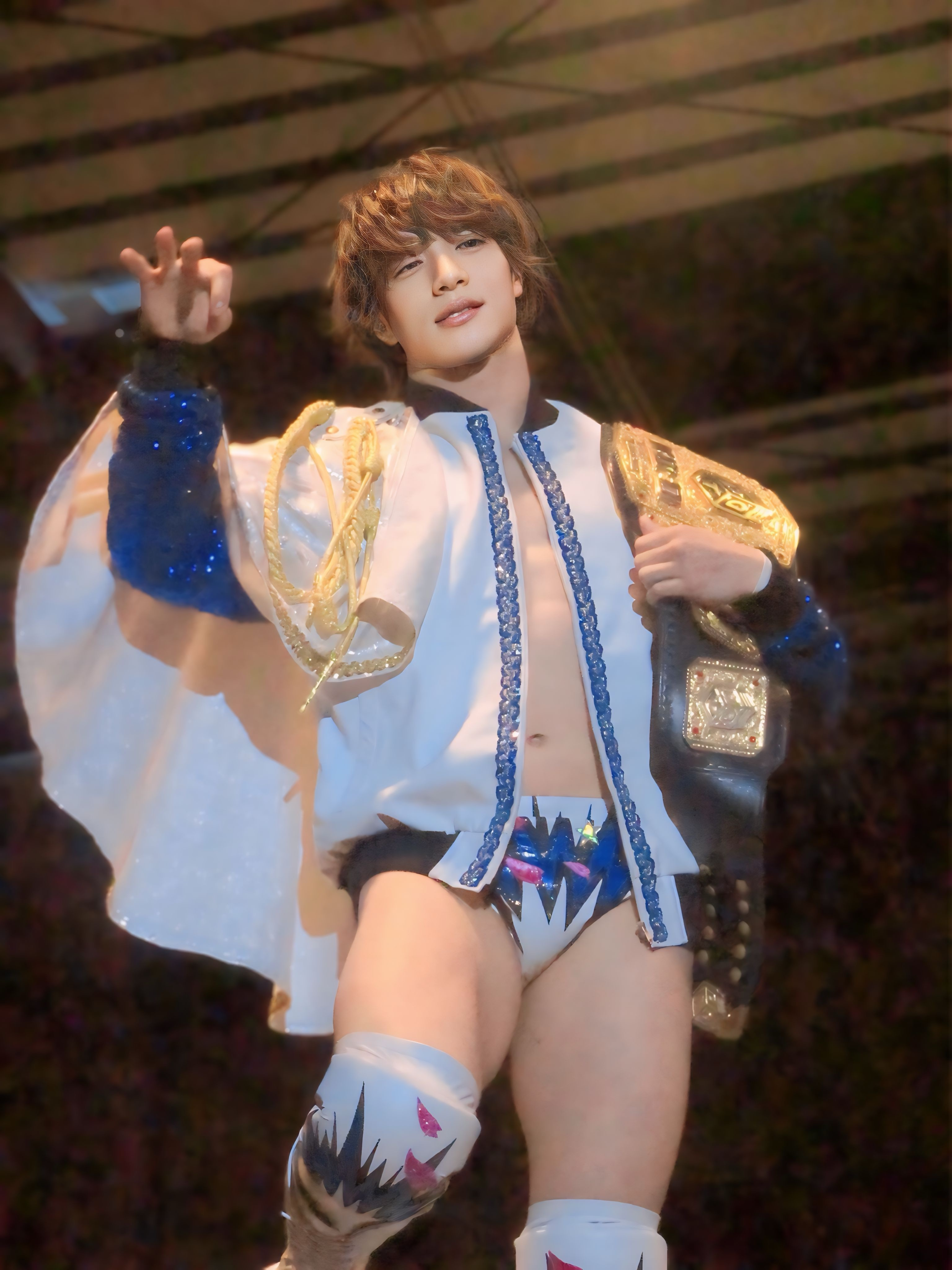
Yuki Ueno

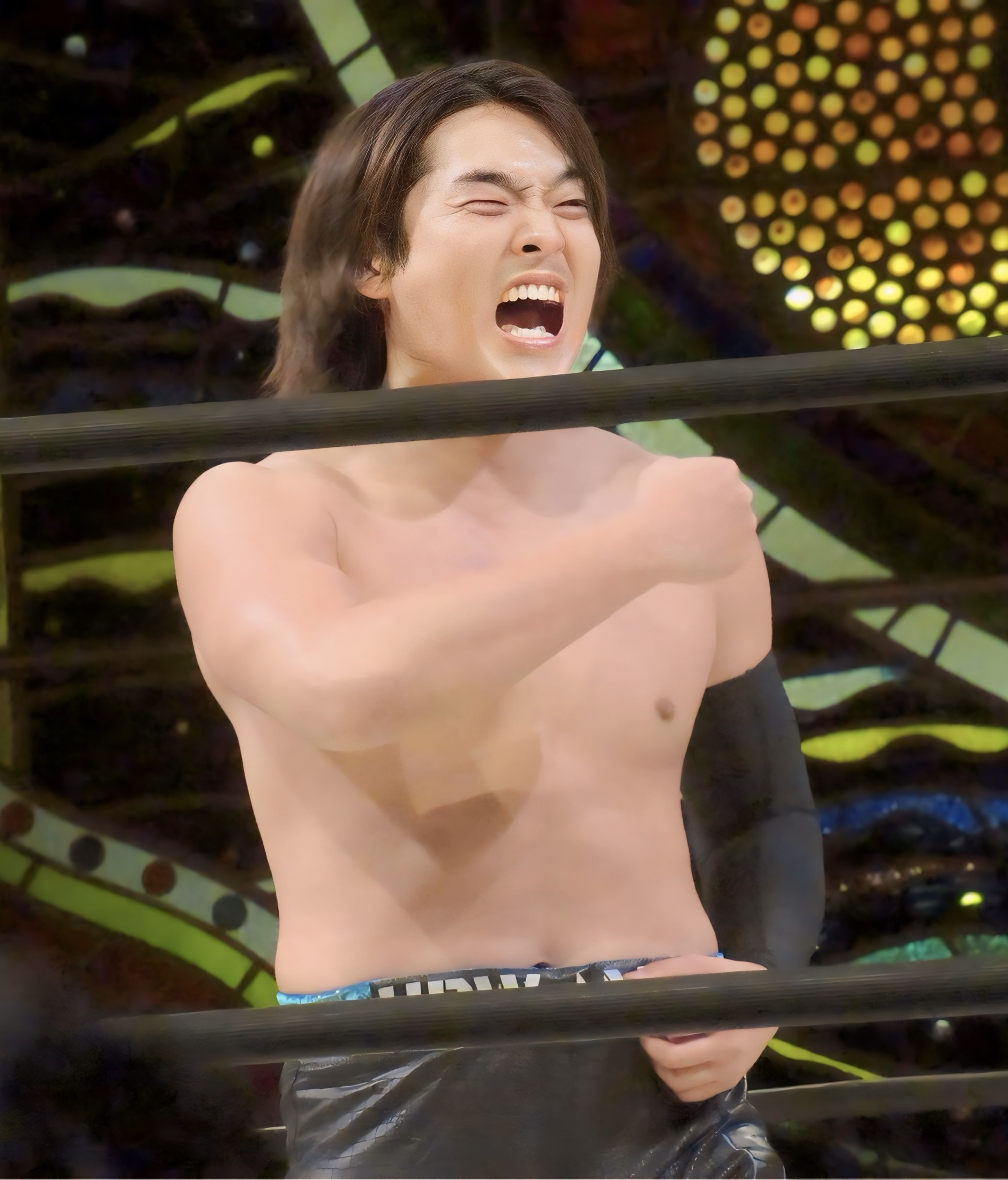
To-y

*	Founding member
L	Leader

=== Current ===
Member		Joined
Yuki Ueno	*	March 14, 2021
Shunma Katsumata	*	March 14, 2021
To-y		November 6, 2021

=== Former ===
Member		Tenure
Konosuke Takeshita	* L	March 14, 2021 – July 23, 2023
Mao	*	March 14, 2021 – March 29, 2025

== Championships and accomplishments ==
- All Japan Pro Wrestling
  - All Asia Tag Team Championship (1 time) – Kojima with Atsushi Onita (Note: Onita was only an associate of the stable during this reign, not an official member.)
- DDT Pro-Wrestling

- KO-D Openweight Championship (4 times, current) – Takeshita (1) and Ueno (3)
- DDT Universal Championship (7 times) – Mao (3) and Ueno (4)
- DDT Extreme Championship (4 times, current) – Katsumata (3) and Kojima (1)
- KO-D Tag Team Championship (5 times) – Takeshita and Katsumata (1); Mao and Asuka (Note: Asuka was not part of the stable while holding the titles with Mao.) (1); and Mao and Katsumata (2); Mao and To-y (1)
- KO-D 6-Man Tag Team Championship (1 time) – To-y, Ueno and Kaisei Takechi (Note: Takechi was only an associate of the stable during this reign.)
- KO-D 10-Man Tag Team Championship (1 time) – Mao, Katsumata, Ueno, Kojima and Shinya Aoki (Note: Aoki was only an associate of the stable during this reign, not an official member.)
- Ironman Heavymetalweight Championship (22 times) – Katsumata (4), Mao (8), Kojima (3) and Ueno (7)
- D-Oh Grand Prix – Takeshita (2021 II)
- King of DDT – Takeshita (2021), Mao (2024)
- Ultimate Tag League – Takeshita and Katsumata (2021)

- Pro Wrestling Illustrated

- Ranked Takeshita No. 59 of the top 500 singles wrestlers in the PWI 500 in 2022
- Ranked Ueno No. 143 of the top 500 singles wrestlers in the PWI 500 in 2021
- Ranked Mao No. 309 of the top 500 singles wrestlers in the PWI 500 in 2022

- Tokyo Sports
  - Fighting Spirit Award (2021) – Takeshita

== See also ==
- Damnation T.A.
- Burning
