= Hideki Okatani =

Japanese professional wrestler

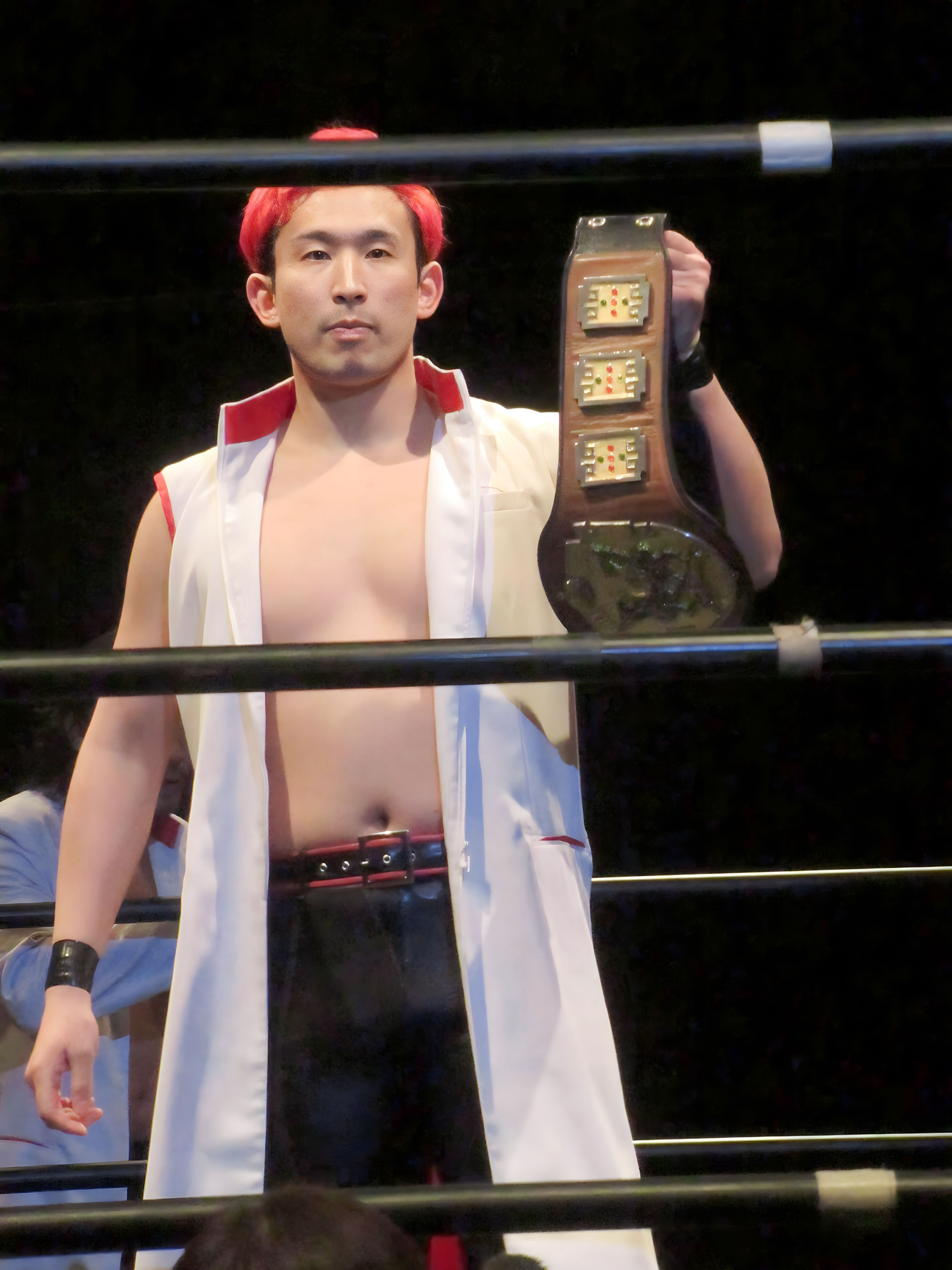
- Okatani in December 2023

Personal information
- Born: November 12, 2000 (age 25) Kochi Prefecture, Japan

Professional wrestling career
- Ring name: Hideki Okatani
- Billed height: 1.75 m (5 ft 9 in)
- Billed weight: 81 kg (179 lb)
- Debut: March 20, 2020

Japanese name
- Kanji: 岡谷 英樹
- Hiragana: おかたに ひでき
- Katakana: オカタニ ヒデキ
Transcriptions
- Romanization: Okatani Hideki

Hideki Okatani (岡谷英樹, Okatani Hideki; born November 12, 2000) is a Japanese professional wrestler who works for DDT Pro-Wrestling (DDT), where he is a former DDT Extreme Champion and a member of the Eruption stable.

== Professional wrestling career ==
=== DDT Pro-Wrestling (2020–present) ===
Okatani made his professional wrestling debut with DDT Pro-Wrestling (DDT) on March 20, 2020, at Judgement where he teamed with Shunma Katsumata and lost to Naomi Yoshimura and Keigo Nakamura. On June 20, he had his first win in a singles match against Keigo Nakamura. In July, he joined Jun Akiyama's stable Akiyama-gun (later renamed Junretsu).

On June 6, 2021, at CyberFight Festival, he was scheduled to take part in the DDT vs. Kongo 14-man tag team match, but before the event, Masa Kitamiya left Kongo which led to the match being changed to a 12-man tag team match, and Okatani was then scheduled for a singles match against Kitamiya, which he lost in under three minutes. On October 12, at Get Alive, Junretsu failed to capture the KO-D 8-Man Tag Team Championship from Team Olympian (Yoshiaki Yatsu, Akito, Hiroshi Yamato and Keigo Nakamura). As a result, and as per Junretsu leader Makoto Oishi's decision, the stable disbanded on October 23. On November 10, at the D-Oh Grand Prix 2021 II event at Shinjuku Face, Okatani pinned Akito to win the Ironman Heavymetalweight Championship. He then quickly dropped the title to Kazuki Hirata at the same event.

On January 3, 2022, Okatani was defeated by Eruption member Kazusada Higuchi. After the match, the rest of Eruption (Yukio Sakaguchi and Saki Akai) welcomed Okatani in their stable. In February, Okatani teamed with Higuchi for the 2022 Ultimate Tag League. The team finished their block with a record of one win, two losses and a no contest, scoring two points and failing to advance to the finals. On May 1, at Mega Max Bump, Okatani teamed with Akai for a mixed tag team match in a losing effort to Maya Yukihi and Shunma Katsumata. Later this month, following the injury of Minoru Fujita which led to the vacancy of the KO-D 6-Man Tag Team Championship, Okatani teamed with Higuchi and Sakaguchi in a four-team tournament to crown new champions. On May 6, they defeated the team of Akito, Hikaru Machida and Thanomsak Toba, then on May 22, at Audience, they fell short to Damnation T.A (Daisuke Sasaki, Kanon and MJ Paul) in the finals. On June 16, he was defeated by Harashima in the first round of the King of DDT Tournament. On August 20, at Wrestle Peter Pan 2022, he teamed with Sakaguchi and Harashima to defeat the team of Naomi Yoshimura, Kota Umeda and Keisuke Okuda. On September 4, at Dramatic Explosion 2022, Okatani, Akai and Sakaguchi unsuccessfully challenged Daisuke Sasaki, Kanon and MJ Paul for the KO-D 6-Man Tag Team Championship.

Between January and February 2023, Okatani competed in the D Generations Cup. He defeated Kazuma Sumi and Ilusion, but fell short to the eventual A block winner Yuya Koroku, finishing the tournament second of his block with a record of two wins and one loss. On February 21, at Keiji Muto Grand Final Pro-Wrestling "Last" Love, he teamed with Tetsuya Endo, Yuya Koroku and Takeshi Masada in a losing effort to The37Kamiina (Mao, Shunma Katsumata, Yuki Ueno and Toy Kojima). On April 1, Okatani won a qualifying tomoesen to earn a spot in the 2023 King of DDT Tournament by successively defeating Toy Kojima and Yuya Koroku. In the tournament, he defeated Shunma Katsumata before being defeated by Kazusada Higuchi in the second round. On May 21, at the final event of the King of DDT Tournament, Okatani unsuccessfully challenged Shunma Katsumata in a Piercing Deathmatch for the DDT Extreme Championship. On July 7, at a Tanabata Special event, Okatani teamed up with Saki Akai and Yukio Sakaguchi to defeat Ilusion and two thirds of the KO-D 6-Man Tag Team champions Kazusada Higuchi and Yuki Ishida (now part of the Harimau stable after Higuchi left Eruption). On July 23, at Wrestle Peter Pan, Okatani, Akai and Sakaguchi went on to defeat Harimau (Kazusada Higuchi, Ryota Nakatsu and Yuki Ishida) to win the KO-D 6-Man Tag Team Championship.

== Championships and accomplishments ==
Okatani is a former one-time DDT Extreme Champion.

- All Japan Pro Wrestling
  - All Asia Tag Team Championship (1 time) – with Yukio Sakaguchi
  - AJPW TV Six-Man Tag Team Championship (1 time) – with Yukio Sakaguchi and Saki Akai
- DDT Pro-Wrestling

- DDT Extreme Championship (1 time)
- Ironman Heavymetalweight Championship (1 time)
- KO-D 6-Man Tag Team Championship (3 times, current) – with Yukio Sakaguchi and Saki Akai (1) and Daisuke Sasaki and Ilusion (2)
- KO-D 10-Man Tag Team Championship (1 time, current) – with Daisuke Sasaki, Demus 3:16, MJ Paul and Ilusion

- Pro Wrestling Illustrated
  - Ranked No. 427 of the top singles wrestlers in the PWI 500 in 2026
