= DDT Universal Championship =

Professional wrestling championship

- The DDT Universal Championship belt

Details
- Promotion: CyberFight
- Brand: DDT Pro-Wrestling
- Date established: February 23, 2020
- Current champion: Ryusuke Taguchi
- Date won: August 11, 2026
Statistics
- First champion: Chris Brookes
- Most reigns: Yuki Ueno (4 reigns)
- Longest reign: Mao (301 days)
- Shortest reign: Miyu Yamashita (1 day)
- Oldest champion: Minoru Suzuki (56 years, 276 days)
- Youngest champion: Kazuma Sumi (22 years, 360 days)
- Heaviest champion: Gringo Loco (253 lb (115 kg))
- Lightest champion: Kazuma Sumi (143 lb (65 kg))

The DDT Universal Championship (Japanese: DDT UNIVERSAL王座, Hepburn: DDT Yunibāsaru Ōza) is a professional wrestling championship in the Japanese promotion DDT Pro-Wrestling. Established on February 23, 2020, at Into The Fight 2020, the title was created as part of DDT's plans to expand internationally and reach a larger audience. The inaugural champion was Chris Brookes. The current champion is Ryusuke Taguchi.

== History ==
On December 28, 2019, at the start of the D-Oh Grand Prix 2020 final event, DDT Pro-Wrestling's General Manager Hisaya Imabayashi announced the creation of a new championship designed to be contended for by more international wrestlers. To determine the inaugural DDT Universal Champion, a match was scheduled for DDT's Into The Fight 2020 event on February 23. On January 7, 2020, it was announced that the match would pit Konosuke Takeshita against Chris Brookes. At the event, Brookes defeated Takeshita to become the inaugural champion.

== Reigns ==
As of November 18, 2026, there have been a total of 22 reigns shared between 14 different wrestlers. Ryusuke Taguchi is the current champion, in his first reign. He won the title by defeating Kazuma Sumi at Wrestle Peter Pan 2026 in Tokyo, Japan on August 11, 2026.

Key
No.	Overall reign number
Reign	Reign number for the specific champion
Days	Number of days held
Defenses	Number of successful defenses
+	Current reign is changing daily

No.	Champion	Championship change			Reign statistics			Notes	Ref.
No.	Champion	Date	Event	Location	Reign	Days	Defenses	Notes	Ref.
1	Chris Brookes	February 23, 2020	Into The Fight 2020	Tokyo, Japan	1	26	0	Defeated Konosuke Takeshita to win the inaugural title.	
2	Daisuke Sasaki	March 20, 2020	Judgement 2020: DDT 23rd Anniversary	Tokyo, Japan	1	99	3		
3	Chris Brookes	June 27, 2020	DDT TV Show! #8	Tokyo, Japan	2	129	2		
4	Yuki Ueno	November 3, 2020	Ultimate Party 2020	Tokyo, Japan	1	291	6		
5	Daisuke Sasaki	August 21, 2021	Wrestle Peter Pan 2021	Kawasaki, Japan	2	211	4		
6	Mao	March 20, 2022	Judgement 2022: DDT 25th Anniversary	Tokyo, Japan	1	73	2	This was a hardcore three-way match also involving Jun Kasai.	
7	Masahiro Takanashi	June 1, 2022	What Are You Doing 2022	Tokyo, Japan	1	80	1		
8	Yuki Ueno	August 20, 2022	Wrestle Peter Pan 2022	Tokyo, Japan	2	146	2		
9	Naruki Doi	January 13, 2023	Sweet Dreams! 2023 Tour in Shinjuku: Fire!	Tokyo, Japan	1	67	1	This was a three-way elimination match also involving Daisuke Sasaki.	
10	Tetsuya Endo	March 21, 2023	Judgement 2023	Tokyo, Japan	1	124	1		
11	Matt Cardona	July 23, 2023	Wrestle Peter Pan 2023	Tokyo, Japan	1	112	1		
12	Mao	November 12, 2023	Ultimate Party 2023	Tokyo, Japan	2	301	11	This was a No Disqualification match.	
13	Yuki Iino	September 8, 2024	Friendship, Effort, Victory in Nagoya 2024	Nagoya, Japan	1	42	2	Iino cashed in his Right to Challenge Anytime Anywhere contract.	
14	Mao	October 20, 2024	God Bless DDT 2024	Tokyo, Japan	3	20	0	Mao cashed in his Right to Challenge Anytime Anywhere contract.	
15	Miyu Yamashita	November 9, 2024	DDT×Defy: DDT In Utero	Seattle, Washington	1	1	0	This was a three-way match also involving Mike Bailey. Yamashita is the first woman to win the title.	
16	Gringo Loco	November 10, 2024	DDT×TJPW×Defy: Triangler DTD	Seattle, Washington	1	77	0	This was a three-way match also involving Nick Wayne.	
17	Yuki Ueno	January 26, 2025	New Year, New Hero. 2025: A New Story Begins	Tokyo, Japan	3	53	0		
18	Minoru Suzuki	March 20, 2025	Judgement 2025	Tokyo, Japan	1	228	5		
19	Yuki Ueno	November 3, 2025	Ultimate Party 2025	Tokyo, Japan	4	83	1	This was a Winner Takes All match also disputed for Ueno's KO-D Openweight Championship.	
20	Daisuke Sasaki	January 25, 2026	Mission in Battle: New Year Splendor	Tokyo, Japan	3	56	0	This was a two-falls three-way match also disputed for Yuki Ueno's KO-D Openweight Championship, and also involving Chris Brookes.	
21	Kazuma Sumi	March 22, 2026	Judgement 2026	Tokyo, Japan	1	142	2		
22	Ryusuke Taguchi	August 11, 2026	Wrestle Peter Pan 2026	Tokyo, Japan	1	99+	4		

== Combined reigns ==
As of November 18, 2026.

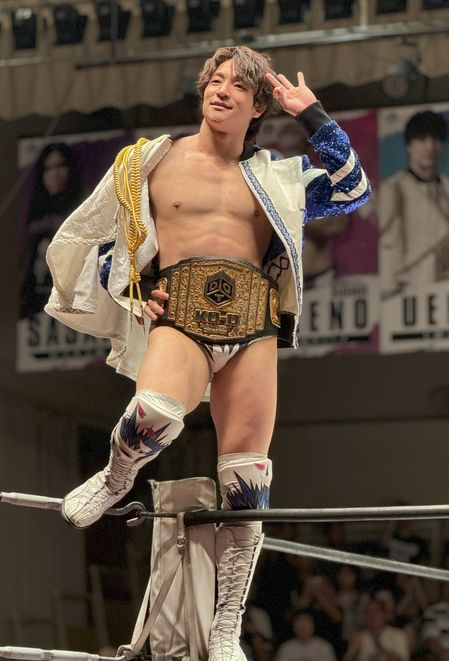
Record four-time and longest reigning champion Yuki Ueno

†	Indicates the current champions

Rank	Wrestler	No. of reigns	Combined defenses	Combined days
1	Yuki Ueno	4	9	573
2	Mao	3	13	394
3	Daisuke Sasaki	3	7	366
4	Minoru Suzuki	1	5	228
5	Chris Brookes	2	2	155
6	Kazuma Sumi	1	2	142
7	Tetsuya Endo	1	1	124
8	Matt Cardona	1	1	112
9	Ryusuke Taguchi †	1	4	99+
10	Masahiro Takanashi	1	1	80
11	Gringo Loco	1	0	77
12	Naruki Doi	1	1	67
13	Yuki Iino	1	2	42
14	Miyu Yamashita	1	0	1

== See also ==
- Professional wrestling in Japan
