= Sayoko Mita =

Japanese sports journalist and TV announcer

- 三田佐代子
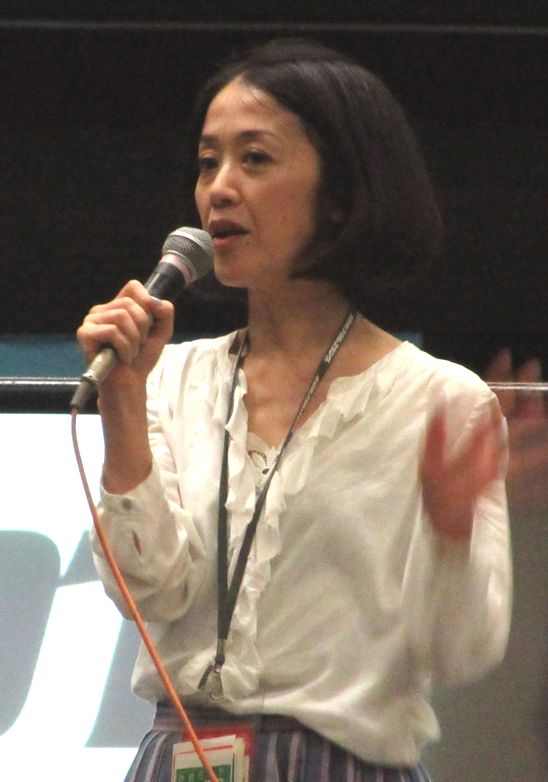
- Mita in 2016

Sayoko Mita (三田佐代子, Mita Sayoko) (born 5 August 1969, in Odawara, Kanagawa) is a Japanese sports journalist and TV announcer.

Mita graduated from the Faculty of Law at the Keio University and in 1992, she joined TV Shizuoka as an announcer. She resigned in 1996 and after working in various sports media, specialised in puroresu as a member of the talent agency Furutachi Project.

Mita is a prominent figure of Fighting TV Samurai puroresu broadcasts as an announcer of the S-Arena (Sアリーナ, Esu Arīna) daily programme as well as the producer and host for the weekly programme Indie no Oshigoto that focuses on the independent circuit. Indie no Oshigoto is co-hosted by the puppet character Carlos the Mexican Mole (voiced by puroresu journalist and colour commentator Hirotsugu Suyama).

== Championships and accomplishments ==
- DDT Pro-Wrestling
  Ironman Heavymetalweight Championship (1 time)
