= Yukio Naya =

Japanese professional wrestler

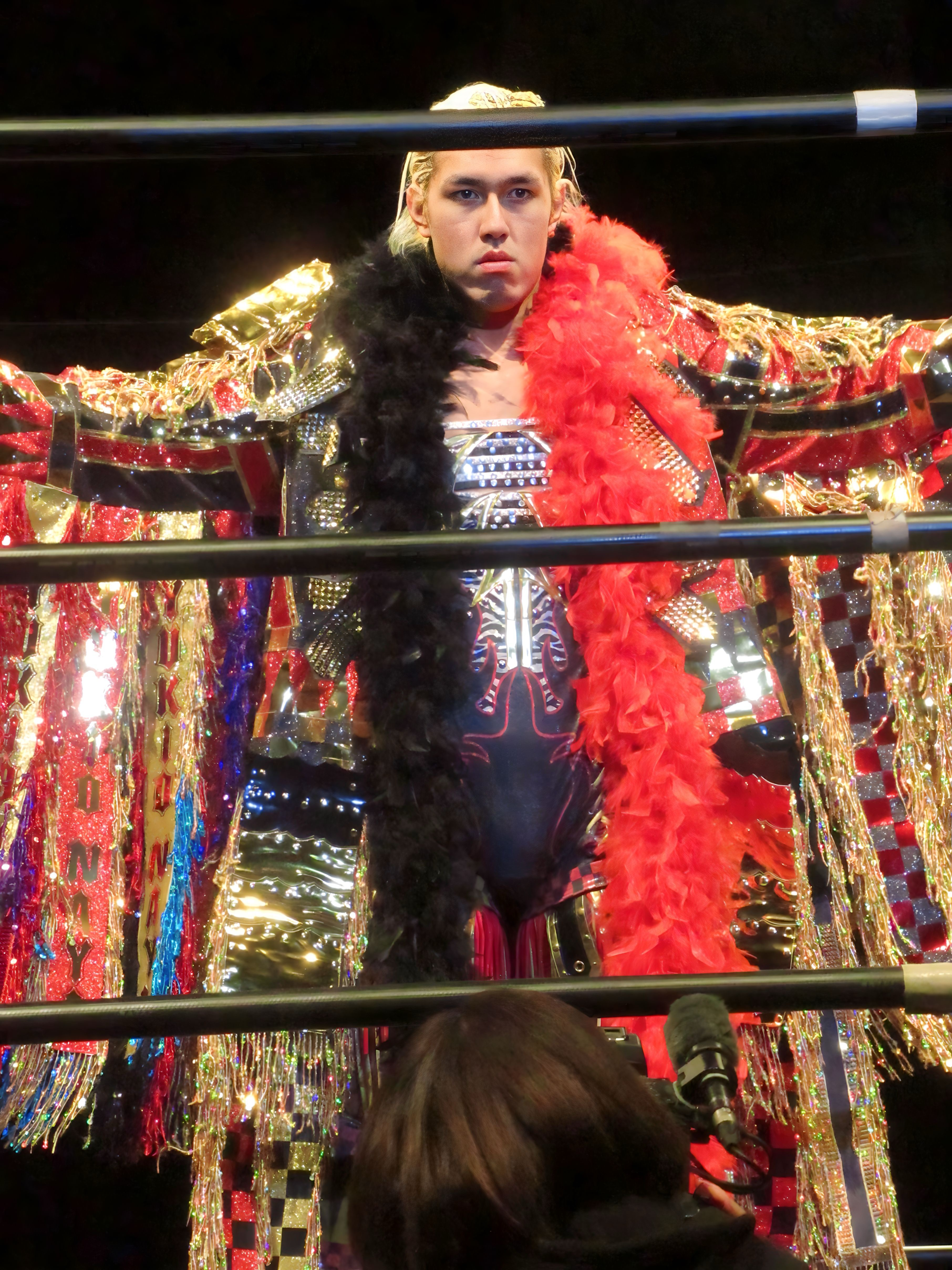
- Naya in February 2024

Personal information
- Born: August 17, 1994 (age 32) Tokyo, Japan
- Family: Takatōriki Tadashige (father); Taihō Kōki (grandfather); Ōhō Kōnosuke (brother)

Professional wrestling career
- Ring name: Yukio Naya
- Billed height: 2.01 m (6 ft 7 in)
- Billed weight: 110 kg (243 lb)
- Debut: 2017

Yukio Naya (納谷幸男, Naya Yukio; born August 17, 1994) is a Japanese professional wrestler, working for the Japanese professional wrestling promotion DDT Pro-Wrestling (DDT). He is a former KO-D 8-Man Tag Team Champion and co-holder of the Ironman Heavymetalweight Championship.

Hailing from a sumo family, he is the son of former sekiwake Takatōriki and grandson of the 48th yokozuna Taihō. He has three younger brothers, Takamori, Konosuke and Kosei, who all compete in sumo under the respective shikona Naya, Ōhō and Mudōhō.

== Professional wrestling career ==
=== Early career ===
Naya made his professional wrestling debut in Real Japan Pro Wrestling on September 14, 2017, at Legend of the Gold VIII, scoring a victory against Raijin Yaguchi. He then appeared in a few tag matches, mainly teaming with Masayuki Kono. On March 15, 2019, at Dynamite Kid Memorial Performance, an event celebrating the life of Dynamite Kid, Naya teamed up with Yuji Okabayashi and Alexander Otsuka to defeat Hideki Suzuki, Hideyoshi Kamitani and Ryoji Sai in his last match with the company.

From September to October 2019, Naya toured with Wrestle-1 alongside Masayuki Kono to take part in the 2018 Wrestle-1 Tag League. Together, they scored two points and failed to advance to the finals.

=== DDT Pro-Wrestling (2019–present) ===
Naya made his DDT Pro-Wrestling debut on February 17, 2019, at Judgement 2019: DDT 22nd Anniversary where he teamed up with Go Shiozaki and Kazusada Higuchi to defeat Daisuke Sekimoto, Toru Owashi and Yuki Iino. On July 15, at Wrestle Peter Pan 2019, he faced Hideki Suzuki in a losing effort.

On January 11, 2020, at the Handmade In Japan FES 2020, he teamed up with Makoto Oishi and fell short to Nautilus (Naomi Yoshimura and Yuki Ueno), All Out (Shunma Katsumata and Yuki Iino) and Keigo Nakamura and Mao in a four-way tag team match. Naya formed a brief team with Cody Hall, with whom he teamed up at Valentine Itabashi Series 2020 on February 1, where they defeated Danshoku Dino and Hiroshi Yamato. On February 23, at Into The Fight 2020, he fell short to Mad Paulie and Keigo Nakamura in a three-way match. Naya won the Ironman Heavymetalweight Championship alongside Mizuki Watase, Antonio Honda and Danshoku Dino at Judgement 2020: DDT 23rd Anniversary, on March 20, after they simultaneously pinned Masahiro Takanashi to become co-champions. On June 7, at the second night of Wrestle Peter Pan 2020, Naya unsuccessfully challenged Shinya Aoki in a No Countout match for the DDT Extreme Division Championship. After having been eliminated from the 2020 King of DDT Tournament by El Lindaman in the first round, Naya participated in a 13-man battle royal for a chance to re-enter the tournament, where he competed against the eventual winner Tetsuya Endo, Antonio Honda, Kazuki Hirata and Yukio Sakaguchi amongst others.

On February 20, 2021, at This Will Be Our Ninth Narimasu Event, Naya teamed up with Chris Brookes and Toy Kojima in a losing effort to Gota Ihashi, Toru Owashi and Antonio Honda. At Into The Fight 2021 on February 28, Naya teamed up with Disaster Box (Harashima and Toru Owashi) to defeat Damnation (Daisuke Sasaki, Mad Paulie) and Nobuhiro Shimatani. At Judgement 2021: DDT 24th Anniversary on March 28, he teamed up with Sanshiro Takagi, Chikara and Yakan Nabe to defeat Shinya Aoki, Super Sasadango Machine, Antonio Honda and Kazuki Hirata for the KO-D 8-Man Tag Team Championship.

On January 3, 2024, Naya defeated Tetsuya Endo to win the D-Oh Grand Prix 2023 tournament.

== Championships and accomplishments ==
- DDT Pro-Wrestling
  - KO-D Tag Team Championship (1 time) – Yuki Iino
  - KO-D 8-Man Tag Team Championship (1 time) – with Sanshiro Takagi, Chikara and Yakan Nabe
  - KO-D 6-Man Tag Team Championship (1 time) – with Kanon and Viento Levante
  - Ironman Heavymetalweight Championship (1 time – with Antonio Honda, Danshoku Dino and Mizuki Watase)
  - D-Oh Grand Prix (2023)
  - Bakuha Koshien Spring Tag Tournament (2021) – with Sanshiro Takagi, Atsushi Onita and Yumehito Imanari
