= Naomi Yoshimura =

Japanese professional wrestler

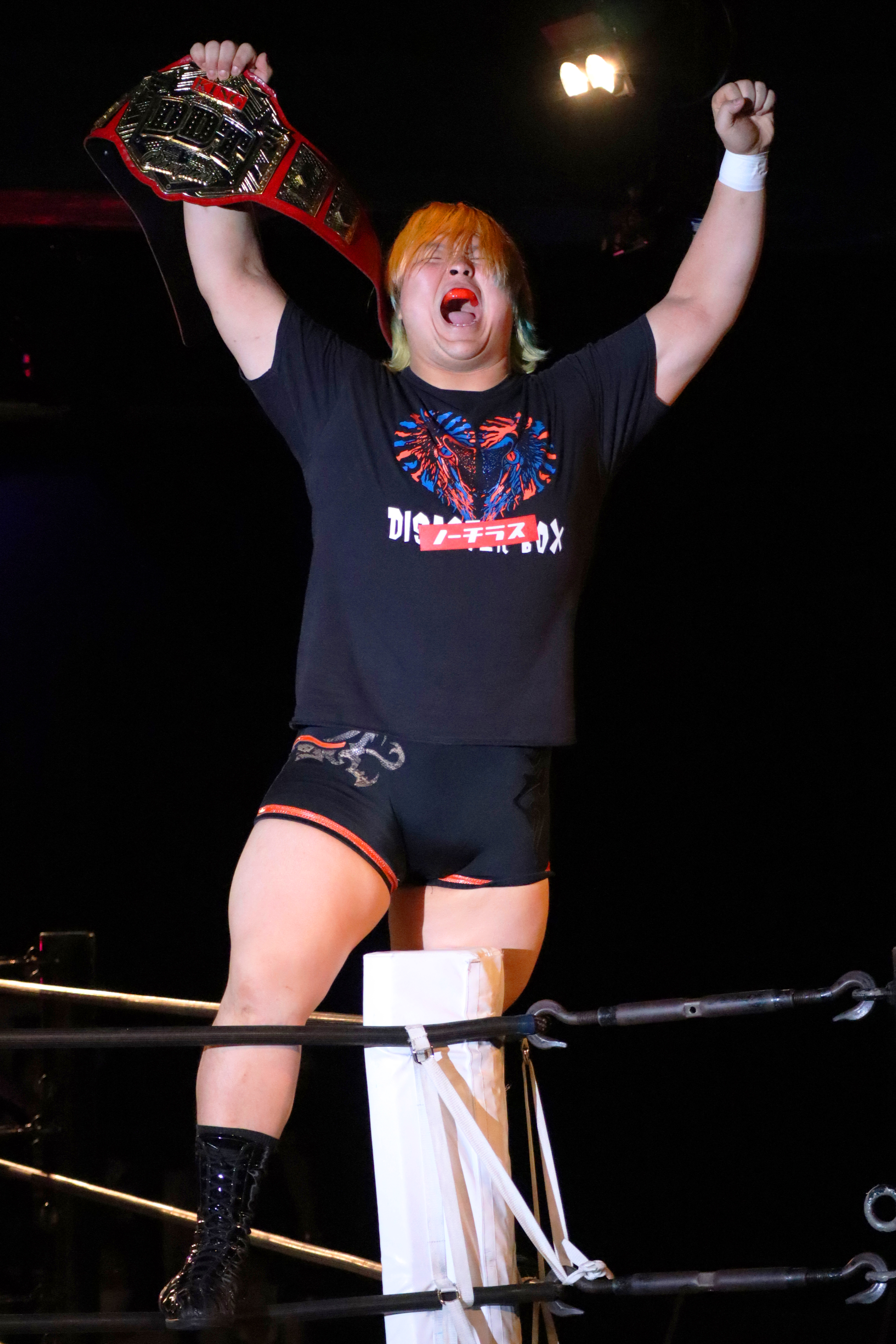
- Yoshimura in July 2020

Personal information
- Born: April 21, 1995 (age 31) Osaka, Japan

Professional wrestling career
- Ring name: Naomi Yoshimura
- Billed height: 1.80 m (5 ft 11 in)
- Billed weight: 117 kg (258 lb)
- Debut: 2016

Naomi Yoshimura (吉村直巳, Yoshimura Naomi) is a Japanese professional wrestler, working for the Japanese professional wrestling promotion Dramatic Dream Team (DDT), where he is currently part of the Harimau faction.

== Professional wrestling career ==
=== Independent circuit (2016–present) ===
Yoshimura is known for his matches from the japanese independent scene, working for various promotions such as All Japan Pro Wrestling, where at AJPW Zeus Festival 2017, an event which portrited eleven years since the debut of Zeus on November 11, he teamed up with Katsumi Oribe and Yasutaka Oosera in a losing effort to NEXTREAM (Kento Miyahara, Naoya Nomura and Yuma Aoyagi). He competed for a brief period of time in the american independent scene, working a couple of matches for IWA Mid-South, one of them taking place at the 22nd anniversary of the promotion from October 18, 2018, where he teamed up with Rekka in a losing effort to The Gym Nasty Boyz (Timmy Lou Retton and White Mike).

He moved to the Canadian wrestling scene, where he competed in the Canadian Wrestling's Elite promotion, working in the CWE Struttin' And Cuttin' Tour, and on the 27th night from November 16, 2018, he participated in a 22-man battle royal to establish the no.1 condentership for the CWE Championship, match where he went against other talent such as Adam Knight and Darren Dalton. The most notable performance was a night later, where he teamed up with Shigehiro Irie and Rekka to unsuccessfully challenge The Kingdom (Matt Taven, T. K. O'Ryan and Vinny Marseglia) for the ROH World Six-Man Tag Team Championship.

==== DDT Pro-Wrestling (2016–present) ====
Yoshimura made his professional wrestling debut in DDT Pro-Wrestling's Osaka Octopus 2016 event on December 4, where he teamed up with Kudo and Soma Takao to defeat Akito, Keisuke Ishii and Yuki Ueno in a six-man tag team match. One of his biggest matches was at DDT New Year Special 2020! on January 3, where he teamed up with Yuki Ueno as part of Nautilus to defeat Damnation (Daisuke Sasaki and Soma Takao) for the KO-D Tag Team Championship. At DDT UNIVERSE LIVE! One Chan Tuesday form March 3, 2020, Yoshimura took part in a 9-man battle royal for a challenge anytime, anywhere contract also involving the winner Yuki Iino, Yukio Naya, Kazusada Higuchi, Kazuki Hirata, Makoto Oishi, Mao and others.

Yoshimura also took part in the biggest events of the promotion. At Wrestle Peter Pan 2019 on July 15, he teamed up with Yuki Ueno as Disaster Box accompanied by Nobuhiro Shimatani and unsuccessfully challenged All Out (Shunma Katsumata, Yuki Iino) and Mizuki Watase in a six-man tag team match. At Wrestle Peter Pan 2020, he teamed up with his Nautilus tag partner Yuki Ueno and successfully defended the KO-D Tag Team Championship against #StrongHearts (T-Hawk and El Lindaman) on the second night of the event from June 7.

He is known for his appearances in the promotion's signature tournaments. At the 2019 edition of King of DDT, he defeated Kazuki Hirata in the first-round, but fell short to Konosuke Takeshita in the round two. One year later, at the 2020 edition of the event, he fell short early to Konosuke Takeshita in the first rounds. In the second rounds, on August 9, he participated in a 13-man battle royal for a second chance to enter the tournament, also involving the winner Tetsuya Endo, Chris Brookes, Mad Paulie, Yukio Sakaguchi and others.

== Championships and accomplishments ==
- DDT Pro-Wrestling

- KO-D Tag Team Championship (3 times) – with Yuki Ueno (1), Harashima (2) and Kazusada Higuchi (1)
- Imaike Rumble (2026)
- Ultimate Tag League (2022) – with Harashima
- DNA Super Tag Tournament (2018) – with Akira Jo
- Pro-Wrestling Koshien (2017)
