= Wrestle Universe =

- Broadcast area: Worldwide
- Headquarters: Shibuya, Tokyo, Japan

Programming
- Languages: Japanese; English
- Picture format: 1080p HD

Ownership
- Owner: CyberFight (CyberAgent)

History
- Launched: January 23, 2017
- Former names: DDT Universe (2017–2020)

Links
- Website: wrestle-universe.com

Wrestle Universe (レッスルユニバース, Ressuru Yunibāsu), formerly known as DDT Universe (DDTユニバース, DDT Yunibāsu), is a subscription-based video streaming service owned by CyberAgent's subsidiary CyberFight.

On October 24, 2016, DDT Owner Sanshiro Takagi came down to the ring prior to that day's event and announced that DDT would be debuting their own video-on-demand service, called DDT Universe, in January 2017.

Some major DDT events air live on the service, which also features matches from the promotion's archives, dating back to 2004, as well as matches from DDT's affiliate and sister promotions DNA (DDT New Attitude), Pro-Wrestling Basara, Tokyo Joshi Pro-Wrestling, Union Pro Wrestling and Ganbare Pro-Wrestling. As well as full shows and matches, the promotion also features documentaries showcasing the lives of wrestlers outside the ring. On January 30, 2020, DDT Universe began airing content from sister company Pro Wrestling Noah. On May 12, DDT Universe was rebranded as Wrestle Universe to reflect that the service offers content from different promotions.

== History ==
On January 23, 2017, DDT Pro-Wrestling announced their own subscription video on-demand named DDT Universe, which companies under the DDT's umbrella being featured as well. On September, DDT Pro-Wrestling became a subsidiary of CyberAgent, who, on January 29, 2020, proceeded to purchase Pro Wrestling Noah.

On May 13, 2020, now with DDT Pro-Wrestling and Pro Wrestling Noah were purchased by the same company, DDT Universe was renamed as Wrestle Universe. On September 1, DDT Pro-Wrestling and Pro Wrestling Noah merged to form CyberFight, with Akito and Naomichi Marufuji being appointed as Executive Vice Presidents of the newly formed company.

== Promotions ==
- DDT Pro-Wrestling
- Dream Star Fighting Marigold
- Ganbare Pro-Wrestling
- Marvelous That's Women Pro Wrestling
- Michinoku Pro Wrestling
- Pro-Wrestling Basara
- Pro Wrestling Noah
- Pro Wrestling Up Town
- Pro Wrestling Zero1
- Sendai Girls' Pro Wrestling
- Tokyo Joshi Pro-Wrestling

== See also ==
- All Japan Pro Wrestling TV
- Honor Club
- New Japan Pro-Wrestling World
- TNA+
- UFC Fight Pass
- WWE Network
- WWNLive
