= Yuki Ueno =

Japanese professional wrestler

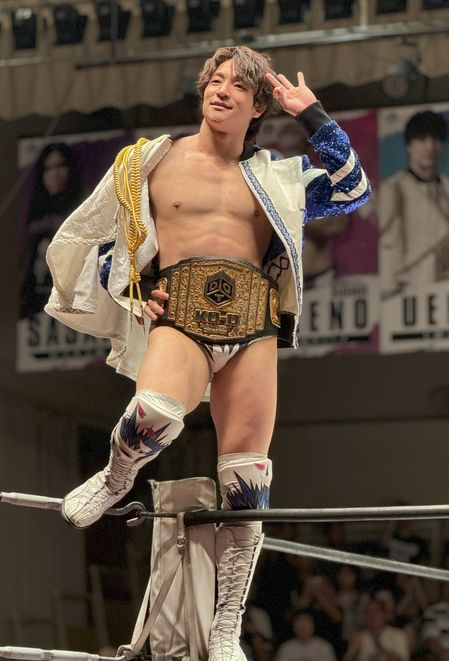
- Ueno in July 2024

Personal information
- Born: September 1, 1995 (age 31) Yao, Osaka, Japan

Professional wrestling career
- Ring name: Yuki Ueno
- Billed height: 1.74 m (5 ft 9 in)
- Billed weight: 78 kg (172 lb)
- Debut: 2016

Yuki Ueno (上野勇希, Ueno Yūki) is a Japanese professional wrestler, He is signed to the Japanese professional wrestling promotion DDT Pro-Wrestling (DDT), where he is the former three-time KO-D Openweight Champion, and former four-times DDT Universal Champion.

== Professional wrestling career ==
=== Independent circuit (2016–present) ===
Ueno made his professional wrestling debut at the 2016 edition of "Who's Gonna Top?" in a time-limit draw dark match against Akito. Throughout his career so far, he has worked mostly for DDT, but had several matches for other promotions such as Dradition where he worked alongside famous wrestlers such as Masato Tanaka, Yukio Sakaguchi and Super Tiger II.

In May 2017, he was a participant in Kaientai Dojo's K-Metal League Tournament of which he reached but ultimately lost the final against Go Asakawa.

He won the first title of his career at DDT's 21st Anniversary show, the KO-D 6-Man Tag Team Championship with Koju Takeda and Kota Umeda after defeating Shuten-Dōji (Kudo, Masahiro Takanashi and Yukio Sakaguchi) in a six-man tag team match. He also won the KO-D Tag Team Championship with his tag team partner Naomi Yoshimura at DDT's 2020 New Year Special after defeating Damnation (Daisuke Sasaki and Soma Takao). Ueno defeated Chris Brookes at Ultimate Party 2020 to win the DDT Universal Championship on November 11. He is also a six-time holder of the comedic Ironman Heavymetalweight Championship, winning it for the first time at DDT Beer Garden 2019 after drinking a beer can. At Judgement 2020: DDT 23rd Anniversary, on March 20, 2020, Ueno teamed up with fellow Disaster Box stablemates Naomichi Marufuji and Harashima to defeat All Out (Akito, Yuki Iino and Royce Chambers).

== Championships and accomplishments ==
- Toshikoshi Puroresu
  - Toshiwasure! Shuffle Six Man Tag Team Tournament (2022) – with Daichi Hashimoto and Yuma Aoyagi
- DDT Pro-Wrestling
  - KO-D Openweight Championship (3 times)
  - DDT Universal Championship (4 times)
  - KO-D Tag Team Championship (1 time) – with Naomi Yoshimura
  - KO-D 6-Man Tag Team Championship (3 times) – with Kota Umeda and Koju Takeda (1), Shinya Aoki and Super Sasadango Machine (1), and To-y and Kaisei Takechi (1)
  - KO-D 10-Man Tag Team Championship (1 time) – with Mao, Shunma Katsumata, Toy Kojima and Shinya Aoki
  - Ironman Heavymetalweight Championship (14 times)
  - D-Oh Grand Prix (2022)
- Pro Wrestling Illustrated
  - Ranked No. 80 of the top 500 singles wrestlers in the PWI 500 in 2026
- Other accomplishments
  - Differ Cup (2017) – with Konosuke Takeshita
