= 2021 in professional wrestling =

2021 in professional wrestling describes the year's events in the world of professional wrestling.

The COVID-19 pandemic severely affected the professional wrestling industry worldwide in 2020, with many promotions presenting shows behind closed doors. Some events were canceled while others were rescheduled to occur in 2021. All Elite Wrestling (AEW) and New Japan Pro-Wrestling reintroduced a limited number of live fans in the second half of 2020, while WWE had live fans at WrestleMania 37 in April 2021. The majority of promotions continued to present empty arena shows or shows with limited capacity, while AEW and WWE resumed live touring with full capacity crowds in July.

== List of notable promotions ==
These promotions held notable events throughout 2021.

Promotion Name	Abbreviation	Notes
Active Advance Pro Wrestling	2AW	
All Elite Wrestling	AEW	
All Japan Pro Wrestling	AJPW	
Big Japan Pro Wrestling	BJW	
CyberFight	CF	CyberFight is an umbrella brand that oversees and promotes four individual promotions: DDT Pro-Wrestling (DDT), Ganbare☆Pro-Wrestling (GanPro), Pro Wrestling Noah (Noah), and Tokyo Joshi Pro Wrestling (TJPW).
Consejo Mundial de Lucha Libre	CMLL	
DDT Pro-Wrestling	DDT	
Dragon Gate	—	
Game Changer Wrestling	GCW	
Gleat	—	Gleat promoted shows under the G Prowrestling and Lidet UWF sub-brands.
Frontier Martial-Arts Wrestling-Explosion	FMW-E	Formerly known as Frontier Martial-Arts Wrestling and Chō Sentō Puroresu FMW (FMW), in June 2021, the company became FMW-E and began to focus on promoting exploding death matches.
Impact Wrestling	Impact	
Lucha Libre AAA Worldwide	AAA	The "AAA" abbreviation has been used since the mid-1990s and had previously stood for the promotion's original name Asistencia Asesoría y Administración.
Major League Wrestling	MLW	
Michinoku Pro Wrestling	M-Pro	
National Wrestling Alliance	NWA	
New Japan Pro-Wrestling	NJPW	
Pro Wrestling Zero1	Zero1	
Ring of Honor	ROH	
World Wonder Ring Stardom	Stardom	
WWE	—	"WWE" stands for World Wrestling Entertainment, which is still the legal name, but the company ceased using the full name in April 2011, with the WWE abbreviation becoming an orphaned initialism. WWE divided its roster into five storyline divisions – referred to as brands where wrestlers exclusively performed on their respective weekly television programs. Raw, SmackDown, and NXT were their three main brands, while NXT UK and 205 Live were specialty brands promoted under the NXT banner.

== Calendar of notable shows ==
=== January ===
Date	Promotion(s)	Event	Location	Main Event	Notes
1	WWE: SmackDown	New Year's SmackDown	St. Petersburg, Florida	Kevin Owens defeated Jey Uso	Aired as a special episode of SmackDown.
4	WWE: Raw	Legends Night	St. Petersburg, Florida	Drew McIntyre (c) defeated Keith Lee to retain the WWE Championship	Aired as a special episode of Raw. Final appearances of Big Show and Mark Henry in WWE.
4	NJPW	Wrestle Kingdom 15 in Tokyo Dome	Tokyo, Japan	Night 1: Kota Ibushi defeated Tetsuya Naito (c) to win the IWGP Heavyweight Championship and IWGP Intercontinental Championship	Due to the COVID-19 pandemic, the event had a limited attendance capacity of 20,000 for both nights; the Tokyo Dome has a total maximum capacity of 57,000.
5	NJPW	Wrestle Kingdom 15 in Tokyo Dome	Tokyo, Japan	Night 2: Kota Ibushi (c) defeated Jay White to retain the IWGP Heavyweight Championship and IWGP Intercontinental Championship	Due to the COVID-19 pandemic, the event had a limited attendance capacity of 20,000 for both nights; the Tokyo Dome has a total maximum capacity of 57,000.
6	NJPW	New Year Dash!!	Tokyo, Japan	Los Ingobernables de Japón (Sanada, Shingo Takagi, Tetsuya Naito, Hiromu Takahashi, and Bushi) defeated Golden Ace (Kota Ibushi and Hiroshi Tanahashi), Roppongi 3K (Rocky Romero and Sho), and Master Wato	
6	MLW	Kings of Colosseum	Orlando, Florida	Alexander Hammerstone (c) vs. Mads Krügger for the MLW National Openweight Championship ended in a double countout	
6	WWE: NXT	New Year's Evil	Orlando, Florida	Finn Bálor (c) defeated Kyle O'Reilly to retain the NXT Championship	Aired as a special episode of NXT. "New Year's Evil" was previously a title of a special episode of WCW Monday Nitro that aired on December 27, 1999.
6	AEW	New Year's Smash	Jacksonville, Florida	Night 1: Kenny Omega (c) defeated Rey Fénix to retain the AEW World Championship	Aired as a two-part special of Dynamite. Night 1 was originally scheduled to air on December 30, 2020, with Night 2 on January 6, but the two-week event was delayed as AEW held a tribute show for Mr. Brodie Lee following his passing on December 26. Night 1 aired live while Night 2 was pre-recorded on January 7 and aired on January 13.
7	AEW	New Year's Smash	Jacksonville, Florida	Night 2 (aired January 13): Darby Allin (c) defeated Brian Cage to retain the AEW TNT Championship.	Aired as a two-part special of Dynamite. Night 1 was originally scheduled to air on December 30, 2020, with Night 2 on January 6, but the two-week event was delayed as AEW held a tribute show for Mr. Brodie Lee following his passing on December 26. Night 1 aired live while Night 2 was pre-recorded on January 7 and aired on January 13.
9	Impact	Genesis	Nashville, Tennessee	Willie Mack defeated Moose in an "I quit" match	
16	Impact	Hard To Kill	Nashville, Tennessee	Kenny Omega and The Good Brothers (Doc Gallows and Karl Anderson) defeated Rich Swann, Chris Sabin, and Moose	
17	Stardom	Stardom 10th Anniversary Show	Tokyo, Japan	Utami Hayashishita (c) defeated Maika to retain the World of Stardom Championship	
22	WWE: Raw; SmackDown; NXT	Superstar Spectacle	St. Petersburg, Florida	Drew McIntyre and The Indus Sher (Rinku and Saurav) defeated Jinder Mahal and The Bollywood Boyz (Samir Singh and Sunil Singh)	Aired on tape delay on January 26 as a television special for Indian Republic Day.
22	NJPW	Lion's Break Contender	Port Hueneme, California, United States	Week 1: Ren Narita defeated Bateman	Two-week event, promoted as part of New Japan Pro-Wrestling of America's weekly TV show, NJPW Strong.
29	NJPW	Lion's Break Contender	Port Hueneme, California, United States	Week 2: Lio Rush, TJP, and Fred Rosser defeated Bullet Club (El Phantasmo, Hikuleo, and Kenta)	Two-week event, promoted as part of New Japan Pro-Wrestling of America's weekly TV show, NJPW Strong.
29	ROH	The Experience	Baltimore, Maryland	Jonathan Gresham (c) defeated Joe Keys to retain the ROH Pure Championship	Match took place on December 19, 2020, but aired on tape delay on January 29. Aired as a special episode of Ring of Honor Wrestling.
30	NJPW	The New Beginning in Nagoya	Nagoya, Japan	Hiroshi Tanahashi defeated Shingo Takagi (c) to win the NEVER Openweight Championship	
31	WWE: Raw; SmackDown	Royal Rumble	St. Petersburg, Florida	Edge won the 30-man Royal Rumble match by last eliminating Randy Orton to earn a world championship match at WrestleMania 37	Bianca Belair won the women's Royal Rumble match and chose to challenge for the SmackDown Women's Championship at WrestleMania 37. With Edge's win, he became the first wrestler to win a Royal Rumble match after being inducted into the WWE Hall of Fame; he chose to challenge for the Universal Championship. Last appearance of Christian in WWE,
(c) – denotes defending champion(s)

=== February ===
Date	Promotion(s)	Event	Location	Main Event	Notes
3	AEW	Beach Break	Jacksonville, Florida	Kenny Omega and The Good Brothers (Doc Gallows and Karl Anderson) defeated Jon Moxley and Death Triangle (Pac and Rey Fénix)	Aired as a special episode of Dynamite.
4	AJPW; NJPW; BJW	Giant Baba Anniversary Show	Tokyo, Japan	Keiji Mutoh, Satoshi Kojima, and Suwama defeated Kaz Hayashi, Hiroyoshi Tenzan, and Masayuki Kono	
10	NJPW	The New Beginning in Hiroshima	Hiroshima, Japan	Night 1: Hiromu Takahashi (c) defeated Sho to retain the IWGP Junior Heavyweight Championship	
11	NJPW	The New Beginning in Hiroshima	Hiroshima, Japan	Night 2: Kota Ibushi (c) defeated Sanada to retain the IWGP Heavyweight Championship and IWGP Intercontinental Championship	
11	CF: Noah	Destination: Back to Budokan	Tokyo, Japan	Keiji Mutoh defeated Go Shiozaki (c) to win the GHC Heavyweight Championship	
13	Impact	No Surrender	Nashville, Tennessee	Rich Swann (c) defeated Tommy Dreamer to retain the Impact World Championship	
13	GCW	Bloodsport 4	Los Angeles, California	Jeff Cobb defeated Chris Dickinson	Aired on tape delay on February 20
14	CF: DDT	Kawasaki Strong	Kawasaki, Japan	Jun Akiyama defeated Tetsuya Endo (c) to win the KO-D Openweight Championship	
14	WWE: NXT	TakeOver: Vengeance Day	Orlando, Florida	Finn Bálor (c) defeated Pete Dunne to retain the NXT Championship	First Vengeance event since 2011.
17	MLW	Filthy Island	Kauaʻi, Hawaii	Low Ki defeated King Mo Lawal in a No Holds Barred match	
19	NJPW	The New Beginning USA; Week 1	Port Hueneme, California	El Phantasmo defeated Lio Rush	The first part of a two-week event, promoted as part of New Japan Pro-Wrestling of America's weekly TV show, NJPW Strong.
20	GCW	Bloodsport 5	Los Angeles, California	Jon Moxley defeated Davey Boy Smith Jr.	
21	WWE: Raw; SmackDown	Elimination Chamber	St. Petersburg, Florida	Drew McIntyre (c) defeated AJ Styles, Jeff Hardy, Kofi Kingston, Randy Orton, and Sheamus in an Elimination Chamber match to retain the WWE Championship, then The Miz cashed in his Money in the Bank contract and defeated McIntyre (c) to win the WWE Championship	Final WWE PPV to air on the standalone version of the WWE Network in the United States before its merger under Peacock on March 18.
26	NJPW	The New Beginning USA; Week 2	Port Hueneme, California	Jon Moxley (c) defeated Kenta to retain the IWGP United States Championship	The second part of a two-week event, promoted as part of New Japan Pro-Wrestling of America's weekly TV show, NJPW Strong.
27	NJPW	Castle Attack	Osaka, Japan	Night 1: Kazuchika Okada defeated Evil	
28	NJPW	Castle Attack	Osaka, Japan	Night 2: Kota Ibushi (c) defeated Tetsuya Naito to retain the IWGP Intercontinental Championship	
28	CF: DDT	Into The Fight 2021	Tokyo, Japan	Shunma Katsumata (c) defeated Mao to retain the DDT Extreme Championship	
(c) – denotes defending champion(s)

=== March ===
Date	Promotion(s)	Event	Location	Main Event	Notes
3	AEW	The Crossroads	Jacksonville, Florida	"Hangman" Adam Page and John Silver defeated Marq Quen and Matt Hardy	Aired as a special episode of Dynamite. This event featured the AEW debut appearance of Paul Wight, formerly known as Big Show in WWE, which was his first appearance on TNT since 1999; Wight's signing with the company was announced on February 24.
3	Stardom	All Star Dream Cinderella	Tokyo, Japan	Tam Nakano defeated Giulia (c) in a Hair vs. Hair match to win the Wonder of Stardom Championship	
4	NJPW	NJPW 49th Anniversary Show	Tokyo, Japan	Kota Ibushi (c) defeated El Desperado to unify the IWGP Heavyweight Championship and IWGP Intercontinental Championship into the IWGP World Heavyweight Championship	First event to feature the IWGP World Heavyweight Championship. Ibushi held both the Heavyweight and Intercontinental championships going into the match and was recognized as the inaugural World Heavyweight Champion upon defeating El Desperado.
6	CF: Noah	Full Throttle in Yokohama	Yokohama, Kanagawa	Momo no Seishun Tag (Atsushi Kotoge and Daisuke Harada) and Junta Miyawaki defeated Full Throtle (Hajime Ohara, Seiki Yoshioka and Yo-Hey)	
7	CF: Noah	Great Voyage in Yokohama	Yokohama, Kanagawa	The Aggression (Katsuhiko Nakajima and Masa Kitamiya) defeated Sugiura-gun (Kazushi Sakuraba and Takashi Sugiura) (c) to win the GHC Tag Team Championship	
7	AEW	Revolution	Jacksonville, Florida	Kenny Omega (c) defeated Jon Moxley in an Exploding Barbed Wire Deathmatch to retain the AEW World Championship	This event was originally scheduled to be held on February 27, but was pushed back due to the Canelo Alvarez vs. Avni Yildirim boxing match, resulting in this being AEW's first PPV held on a Sunday. This event also featured Sting's first match in AEW as well as his first match since WWE Night of Champions in September 2015. Sting's match, which was a tag team Street Fight, was pre-recorded on an unknown date at an undisclosed location in Atlanta, Georgia. The event also saw the debuts of Christian Cage and Ethan Page in AEW.
11	AEW	St. Patrick's Day Slam	Jacksonville, Florida	Thunder Rosa defeated Dr. Britt Baker, D.M.D. in an Unsanctioned Lights Out match	Aired on tape delay on March 17 as a special Saint Patrick's Day episode of Dynamite. First Dynamite to feature a women's match as the main event.
13	Impact	Sacrifice	Nashville, Tennessee	Rich Swann (Impact) defeated Moose (TNA) to unify the Impact World Championship and TNA World Heavyweight Championship as the Impact Unified World Championship	Aired as an Impact Plus special. Shortly after, the Impact Unified World Championship reverted to being called the Impact World Championship.
14	CF: Noah	Great Voyage in Fukuoka	Fukuoka, Japan	Keiji Muto (c) defeated Kaito Kiyomiya to retain the GHC Heavyweight Championship	
19	NJPW	Strong Style Evolved; Week 1	Port Hueneme, California	Brody King defeated Bateman	The first part of a two-week event, promoted as part of New Japan Pro-Wrestling of America's weekly TV show, NJPW Strong.
21	CF: Noah	The Infinity	Tokyo, Japan	Kazuyuki Fujita defeated Kenoh (c) to win the GHC National Championship	
21	NWA	Back For The Attack	Atlanta, Georgia	Nick Aldis (c) defeated Aron Stevens to retain the NWA Worlds Heavyweight Championship	
21	WWE: Raw; SmackDown	Fastlane	St. Petersburg, Florida	Roman Reigns (c) defeated Daniel Bryan to retain the WWE Universal Championship with Edge as the special guest enforcer	First Fastlane event since 2019. The event was available on PPV, the WWE Network, and Peacock's WWE Network channel, marking the first WWE PPV to air on the WWE Network via Peacock in the United States under a new agreement with NBCUniversal, which began March 18, as well as the final event to be available on the standalone version of the American WWE Network before its shutdown on April 4. Also the final WWE PPV held at Tropicana Field, as the WWE ThunderDome was relocated to Yuengling Center in Tampa, Florida, which began April 12.
26	ROH	ROH 19th Anniversary	Baltimore, Maryland	Rush (c) defeated Jay Lethal to retain the ROH World Championship	
26	CMLL	La Copa Junior VIP	Mexico City, Mexico	Volador Jr. (c) defeated Bandido to retain the NWA World Historic Welterweight Championship	
26	NJPW	Strong Style Evolved; Week 2	Port Hueneme, California	David Finlay and Karl Fredericks defeated Team Filthy (Tom Lawlor and Danny Limelight)	The second part of a two-week event, promoted as part of New Japan Pro-Wrestling of America's weekly TV show, NJPW Strong.
28	CF: DDT	Judgement: DDT 24th Anniversary	Tokyo, Japan	Jun Akiyama (c) defeated Kazusada Higuchi to retain the KO-D Openweight Championship	
31	MLW	Never Say Never	Orlando, Florida	Jacob Fatu (c) defeated Calvin Tankman to retain the MLW World Heavyweight Championship	
(c) – denotes defending champion(s)

=== April ===
Date	Promotion(s)	Event	Location	Main Event	Notes
2	WWE: SmackDown	WrestleMania SmackDown	St. Petersburg, Florida	Jey Uso won the 22-man André the Giant Memorial Battle Royal by last eliminating Shinsuke Nakamura	Aired on tape delay on April 9 as a special WrestleMania Edition of SmackDown the night before WrestleMania 37 Night 1. Final show taped at Tropicana Field before WWE relocated the WWE ThunderDome to Yuengling Center in Tampa, Florida; shows from the Yuengling Center began with the April 12 episode of Raw.
4	NJPW	Sakura Genesis	Tokyo, Japan	Will Ospreay defeated Kota Ibushi (c) to win the IWGP World Heavyweight Championship	
4	Stardom	Yokohama Dream Cinderella	Yokohama, Japan	Giulia and Syuri defeated Maika and Himeka (c) to win the Goddesses of Stardom Championship	
7	WWE: NXT	TakeOver: Stand & Deliver	Orlando, Florida	Night 1: Raquel González defeated Io Shirai (c) to win the NXT Women's Championship	First TakeOver held across two nights. The first night was simulcasted on the USA Network, marking the first TakeOver to air on USA, while the second night aired on PPV; both nights also aired on the WWE Network, which was the first WWE in-ring event to air on Peacock's WWE Network channel in the United States after the shutdown of the standalone version of the American WWE Network on April 4. Also the first TakeOver to air on a Wednesday and Thursday night.
8	WWE: NXT	TakeOver: Stand & Deliver	Orlando, Florida	Night 2: Kyle O'Reilly defeated Adam Cole in an unsanctioned match	First TakeOver held across two nights. The first night was simulcasted on the USA Network, marking the first TakeOver to air on USA, while the second night aired on PPV; both nights also aired on the WWE Network, which was the first WWE in-ring event to air on Peacock's WWE Network channel in the United States after the shutdown of the standalone version of the American WWE Network on April 4. Also the first TakeOver to air on a Wednesday and Thursday night.
8	WWE: NXT UK	Prelude	London, England	Walter (c) defeated Rampage Brown to retain the NXT United Kingdom Championship	Taped beforehand on an unknown date. Aired as a special episode of NXT UK, which aired midday before TakeOver: Stand & Deliver Night 2.
8	GCW	Bloodsport 6	Tampa, Florida	Josh Barnett defeated Jon Moxley	
9	NJPW	New Japan Cup USA Round 1	Port Hueneme, California	Brody King defeated Chris Dickinson	
10	Impact	Hardcore Justice	Nashville, Tennessee	Violent By Design (Eric Young, Deaner, Joe Doering, and Rhino) defeated Team Dreamer (Eddie Edwards, Rich Swann, Willie Mack, and Trey Miguel) in an eight-man Hardcore War	
10	WWE: Raw; SmackDown	WrestleMania 37	Tampa, Florida	Night 1: Bianca Belair defeated Sasha Banks (c) to win the WWE SmackDown Women's Championship	This event was originally scheduled to take place in Inglewood, California on March 28, but was delayed and moved to Raymond James Stadium in Tampa (the original location of WrestleMania 36) due to the COVID-19 pandemic, as COVID-19 restrictions had yet been lifted in California, but Florida had lifted restrictions, allowing fans to attend events. It was also made a two-night event with a maximum limit of 25,000 spectators each night, being the first WWE event to have ticketed fans in attendance since the March 11, 2020 episode of NXT.
11	WWE: Raw; SmackDown	WrestleMania 37	Tampa, Florida	Night 2: Roman Reigns (c) defeated Edge and Daniel Bryan in a triple threat match to retain the WWE Universal Championship	
13	WWE: NXT	NXT's move to Tuesday	Orlando, Florida	Bronson Reed, Dexter Lumis, Ember Moon, and Shotzi Blackheart defeated The Way (Johnny Gargano, Austin Theory, Candice LeRae, and Indi Hartwell)	First NXT episode since the conclusion of the Wednesday Night Wars and the first on their new night on the USA Network.
16	NJPW	New Japan Cup USA Semi-finals	Port Hueneme, California	Brody King defeated Lio Rush	
23	NJPW	New Japan Cup USA Final	Port Hueneme, California	Tom Lawlor defeated Brody King to win the inaugural NJPW Strong Openweight Championship	
24	CMLL	65th. Aniversario de Arena México	Mexico City, Mexico	Atlantis, Volador Jr. and Euforia defeated Bárbaro Cavernario, Gran Guerrero and Último Guerrero in a two-out-of-three falls six-man tag team match	First Aniversario de Arena México event since 2019, due to a hiatus generated by the ongoing COVID-19 pandemic
25	Impact	Rebellion	Nashville, Tennessee	Kenny Omega (AEW World Champion) defeated Rich Swann (Impact World Champion) in a Winner Takes All match	
28	NJPW	Wrestling Satsuma	Kagoshima, Japan	Night 1: Roppongi 3K (Sho and Yoh) defeated Suzuki-gun (El Desperado and Yoshinobu Kanemaru) to retain the IWGP Junior Heavyweight Tag Team Championship	
29	NJPW	Wrestling Satsuma	Kagoshima, Japan	Night 2: Hiroshi Tanahashi and Kota Ibushi defeated United Empire (Jeff Cobb and Aaron Henare)	
29	CF: Noah	The Glory	Nagoya, Japan	Keiji Muto (c) defeated Masa Kitamiya to retain the GHC Heavyweight Championship	
30	NJPW	LA Dojo Showcase	Port Hueneme, California	Karl Fredericks defeated Clark Connors	
(c) – denotes defending champion(s)

=== May ===
Date	Promotion(s)	Event	Location	Main Event	Notes
1	AAA	Rey de Reyes	San Pedro Cholula, Puebla	Psycho Clown and Pagano vs. Chessman and Sam Adonis ended in a no contest	This event was originally scheduled to be held in Mérida, Yucatán on March 21, 2020, but was postponed due to the COVID-19 pandemic.
3	AJPW	Champion Carnival	Tokyo, Japan	Jake Lee defeated Kento Miyahara in the tournament final to win the 2021 Champion Carnival	
3	NJPW	Wrestling Dontaku	Fukuoka, Japan	Night 1: Jay White defeated Hiroshi Tanahashi (c) to win the NEVER Openweight Championship	
4	NJPW	Wrestling Dontaku	Fukuoka, Japan	Night 2: Will Ospreay (c) defeated Shingo Takagi to retain the IWGP World Heavyweight Championship	
5	AEW	Blood & Guts	Jacksonville, Florida	The Pinnacle (MJF, Wardlow, Shawn Spears, Cash Wheeler, and Dax Harwood) defeated The Inner Circle (Chris Jericho, Jake Hager, Sammy Guevara, Santana and Ortiz) in a Blood and Guts match.	Aired as a special episode of Dynamite and featured the first-ever Blood and Guts match. While the Blood and Guts match aired live, the first hour of the show was pre-taped. This television special was originally scheduled to be held in Newark, New Jersey on March 25, 2020, but was postponed and relocated due to the COVID-19 pandemic.
7	NJPW	Collision; Week 1	Port Hueneme, California	Jon Moxley and Chris Dickinson defeated Yuji Nagata and Ren Narita	The first part of a three-week event, promoted as part of New Japan Pro-Wrestling of America's weekly TV show, NJPW Strong.
7	WWE: SmackDown	Throwback SmackDown	Tampa, Florida	Apollo Crews, King Corbin, Sami Zayn, Chad Gable, and Otis defeated Big E, Kevin Owens, Shinsuke Nakamura, and The Street Profits (Angelo Dawkins and Montez Ford)	Aired as a special episode of SmackDown as part of Fox Sports' Throwback Week and featured logos and other stylistic parts from previous eras of the show.
15	Impact	Under Siege	Nashville, Tennessee	Moose defeated Chris Bey, Chris Sabin, Matt Cardona, Sami Callihan, and Trey Miguel in a six-way match to earn an Impact World Championship match	Aired as an Impact Plus special.
16	WWE: Raw; SmackDown	WrestleMania Backlash	Tampa, Florida	Roman Reigns (c) defeated Cesaro to retain the WWE Universal Championship	First WWE PPV held at Yuengling Center during the COVID-19 pandemic. First Backlash to have an altered title, which became the event series' official name.
19	AJPW	Yokohama Extra	Yokohama, Japan	Ryuki Honda, Shotaro Ashino and Suwama defeat Total Eclipse (Jake Lee, Koji Doi and Kuma Arashi)	
21	AJPW	Champions Night	Tokyo, Japan	Total Eclipse (Hokuto Omori, Jake Lee and Tajiri) defeated Evolution (Dan Tamura, Hikaru Sato and Suwama)	
21	NJPW	Collision; Week 2	Port Hueneme, California	Fred Rosser defeated Hikuleo in a No Disqualification match	The second part of a three-week event, promoted as part of New Japan Pro-Wrestling of America's weekly TV show, NJPW Strong.
23	N/A	Hana Kimura Memorial Show	Tokyo, Japan	Asuka defeated Kagetsu	First anniversary of Hana Kimura's death.
26	Gleat: G Prowrestling	G Prowrestling Ver.0	Tokyo, Japan	Soma Watanabe and #Stronghearts (El Lindaman and T-Hawk) defeated Cima, Kaz Hayashi, and Minoru Tanaka	The first event of Gleat's G Prowrestling sub-brand.
28	CMLL	Copa Dinastías	Mexico City, Mexico	Los Divinos Laguneros (Blue Panther Jr. and Black Panther) defeated Volador Jr. and Flyer to win the 2021 Copa Dinastías.	
28	AEW	Friday Night Dynamite; Week 1	Jacksonville, Florida	Scorpio Sky and Ethan Page defeated Evil Uno and Stu Grayson	Friday airing of Dynamite (due to 2021 NBA playoffs).
28	NJPW	Collision; Week 3	Port Hueneme, California	Tom Lawlor (c) defeated Chris Dickinson to retain the Strong Openweight Championship	The final part of a three-week event, promoted as part of New Japan Pro-Wrestling of America's weekly TV show, NJPW Strong.
30	AEW	Double or Nothing	Jacksonville, Florida	The Inner Circle (Chris Jericho, Jake Hager, Sammy Guevara, Santana and Ortiz) defeated The Pinnacle (MJF, Shawn Spears, Wardlow, Cash Wheeler and Dax Harwood) in a Stadium Stampede match where if The Inner Circle had lost, they would have been forced to disband	This event was originally scheduled to be held in Paradise, Nevada on May 29, but was moved and pushed back a day due to the COVID-19 pandemic. First major wrestling show to operate at full venue capacity during the pandemic. Featured the AEW debut appearance of Mark Henry and Lio Rush.
31	CF: Noah	Mitsuharu Misawa Memorial	Tokyo, Japan	Keiji Mutoh and Masato Tanaka defeated Naomichi Marufuji and Masakatsu Funaki	Commemorative event for Mitsuharu Misawa
(c) – denotes defending champion(s)

=== June ===
Date	Promotion(s)	Event	Location	Main Event	Notes
4	AEW	Friday Night Dynamite; Week 2	Jacksonville, Florida	Dustin Rhodes defeated Nick Comoroto in a Bullrope match	Friday airing of Dynamite (due to 2021 NBA playoffs). Featured the AEW debut appearance of Andrade El Idolo. Featured the first-ever Bullrope match in AEW.
4	CMLL	Viernes Espectacular Con Acceso Al Publico	Mexico City, Mexico	Carístico, Volador Jr., and Mistico defeated El Terrible, Ángel de Oro, and Euforia	First Viernes Espectacular show with fans at full venue capacity.
6	CF: DDT; GanPro; Noah; TJPW	CyberFight Festival	Saitama, Japan	Naomichi Marufuji defeated Keiji Mutoh (c) to win the GHC Heavyweight Championship	CF's first event to feature all four of its brands.
6	NWA	When Our Shadows Fall	Atlanta, Georgia	Nick Aldis (c) defeated Trevor Murdoch by disqualification to retain the NWA Worlds Heavyweight Championship	
7	NJPW	Dominion 6.6 in Osaka-jo Hall	Osaka, Japan	Shingo Takagi defeated Kazuchika Okada to win the vacant IWGP World Heavyweight Championship	The event was originally scheduled to held on June 6, but was postponed to the following day due to the state of emergency in Japan because of the COVID-19 pandemic
9	Gleat: Lidet UWF	Lidet UWF Ver.0	Tokyo, Japan	Takanori Ito defeated Ryo Kawamura in a UWF rules match by referee stoppage	First event of Gleat's Lidet UWF sub-brand; this show was to test the revival of the UWF shoot style.
11	AEW	Friday Night Dynamite; Week 3	Jacksonville, Florida	Adam Page and Preston "10" Vance defeated Team Taz (Brian Cage and Powerhouse Hobbs)	Friday airing of Dynamite (due to 2021 NBA playoffs).
12	Impact	Against All Odds	Nashville, Tennessee	Kenny Omega (c) defeated Moose to retain the Impact World Championship	Aired as an Impact Plus special. The main event was held at Daily's Place in Jacksonville, Florida.
12	Stardom	Tokyo Dream Cinderella	Tokyo, Japan	Utami Hayashishita (c) vs. Syuri for the World of Stardom Championship ended by double knockout	
13	WWE: NXT	TakeOver: In Your House	Orlando, Florida	Karrion Kross (c) defeated Adam Cole, Johnny Gargano, Kyle O'Reilly, and Pete Dunne in a fatal five-way match to retain the NXT Championship	
18	CMLL	Torneo Increíble de Parejas; Night 1	Mexico City, Mexico	Carístico and Virus defeated Blue Panther Jr. and Sansón	
18	AEW	Friday Night Dynamite; Week 4	Jacksonville, Florida	Matt Jackson and The Good Brothers (Doc Gallows and Karl Anderson) defeated Eddie Kingston, Frankie Kazarian, and Penta El Zero Miedo	Friday airing of Dynamite (due to 2021 NBA playoffs).
18	NJPW	Ignition; Week 1	Port Hueneme, California	Satoshi Kojima defeated JR Kratos	Week 1 of a two-part special episode of NJPW Strong.
19	CMLL	Dia Del Padre	Mexico City, Mexico	La Sangre Dinamita (El Cuatrero, Forastero and Sansón) defeated El Sky Team (Místico and Volador Jr.) and Carístico	
20	CMLL	Torneo Increíble de Parejas; Night 2	Mexico City, Mexico	Los Gemelos Diablos (Gemelo Diablo I, Gemelo Diablo II) and Negro Casas defeated El Sky Team (Místico, Volador Jr.) and Titán	
20	WWE: Raw; SmackDown	Hell in a Cell	Tampa, Florida	Bobby Lashley (c) defeated Drew McIntyre in a Last Chance Hell in a Cell match to retain the WWE Championship	WWE's final PPV produced from the WWE ThunderDome, due to the company's resumption of a live touring schedule that began with the July 16 episode of SmackDown. Second Hell in a Cell not held in October.
22	CMLL	62. Aniversario Arena Coliseo Guadalajara	Guadalajara, Jalisco, Mexico	El Hijo del Villano III, El Satánico, Felino Jr. and Mephisto defeated Argos, Atlantis Jr., Carístico and Joker	
22	CMLL	Torneo Increíble de Parejas; Night 3	Mexico City, Mexico	Los Divinos Laguneros (Blue Panther Jr., Black Panther) and Felino defeated Bárbaro Cavernario, Gran Guerrero and Último Guerrero	
25	NJPW	Ignition; Week 2	Port Hueneme, California	Tom Lawlor (c) defeated Karl Fredericks to retain the Strong Openweight Championship	Week 2 of a two-part special episode of NJPW Strong.
25	CMLL	Torneo Increíble de Parejas Finals; Night 4	Mexico City, Mexico	Templario and Volador Jr. defeated Carístico and Virus in a best two-out-of-three falls tag team match to win the 2021 Torneo Increible de Parejas.	
26	AJPW	Champions Night 2	Tokyo, Japan	Jake Lee defeated Kento Miyahara and Yuma Aoyagi in a three-way tomoe battle match to win the vacant Triple Crown Heavyweight Championship	
26	CF: Noah	Cage War	Tokyo, Japan	Masa Kitamiya defeated Katsuhiko Nakajima in a Hair vs. Hair Steel Cage Death match	
26	ROH	Survival of the Fittest	Baltimore, Maryland	Bandido defeated Eli Isom, Chris Dickinson, Rhett Titus, Brian Johnson and Flamita in a Six-Way Elimination match to win the 2021 Survival of the Fittest.	
26	AEW	Saturday Night Dynamite	Jacksonville, Florida	Kenny Omega (c) defeated Jungle Boy to retain the AEW World Championship	Saturday airing of Dynamite (due to 2021 NBA playoffs).
27	CF: Noah	Muta the World	Tokyo, Japan	The Great Muta defeated Kenoh	
30	AEW	Dynamite Fan Appreciation Night	Jacksonville, Florida	MJF defeated Sammy Guevara	Dynamite's return to Wednesday night after disruptions caused by the 2021 NBA playoffs. AEW's final event of their 14-month residency at Daily's Place (which began due to the COVID-19 pandemic), the event was billed as Fan Appreciation Night for live event attendees.
(c) – denotes defending champion(s)

=== July ===
Date	Promotion(s)	Event	Location	Main Event	Notes
1	Gleat	Gleat Ver.1: G Prowrestling; Lidet UWF	Tokyo, Japan	Sho defeated Takanori Ito in a UWF Rules match	Promoted as the official launch of Gleat.
2	NJPW	Fireworks Frenzy	Port Hueneme, California	Fred Rosser defeated Bateman	
3	AAA	Verano de Escándalo	Tequisquiapan, Querétaro, Mexico	Los Mercenarios (Rey Escorpion, Taurus, and Texano Jr.) (c) defeated Los Psycho Circus (Monster Clown, Murder Clown and Psycho Clown) to retain the AAA World Trios Championship	
4	FMW-E	Independence Day	Yokohama, Japan	Atsushi Onita, Minoru Fujita and Ricky Fuji defeated Abdullah Kobayashi, Onryo and Yuko Miyamoto in a barbed wire and explosive rigged ring deathmatch.	
4	Stardom	Yokohama Dream Cinderella in Summer	Yokohama, Japan	Utami Hayashishita (c) defeated Natsuko Tora to retain the World of Stardom Championship	
4	CMLL	Atlantis 38th Anniversary Show; Week 1	Mexico City, Mexico	Atlantis and Atlantis Jr. defeated Pantera del Ring and Pantera del Ring Jr.	
6	WWE: NXT	The Great American Bash	Orlando, Florida	Adam Cole defeated Kyle O'Reilly	Aired as a special episode of NXT.
7	AEW	Road Rager	Miami, Florida	The Young Bucks (Matt Jackson and Nick Jackson) (c) defeated Eddie Kingston and Penta El Zero Miedo in a Street Fight to retain the AEW World Tag Team Championship	Aired as a special episode of Dynamite. AEW's first event held outside of Daily's Place in Jacksonville, Florida following a year of using the venue as a home base due to the COVID-19 pandemic, becoming the first major American promotion to resume live touring during the pandemic. The event also marked the AEW in-ring debut of Andrade El Idolo, as well as the AEW debut appearance of Malakai Black, formerly Aleister Black in WWE.
10	MLW	Battle Riot III	Philadelphia, Pennsylvania	Alexander Hammerstone won a 40-man battle riot match for a future MLW World Heavyweight Championship opportunity	First MLW event with live fans since March 13, 2020 due to the COVID-19 pandemic
10	NJPW	Summer Struggle in Sapporo	Sapporo, Japan	El Desperado (c) defeated Taiji Ishimori to retain the IWGP Junior Heavyweight Championship	
11	NJPW	Summer Struggle in Sapporo	Sapporo, Japan	Los Ingobernables de Japón (Tetsuya Naito and Sanada) defeated Dangerous Tekkers (Taichi and Zack Sabre Jr.) (c) to win the IWGP Tag Team Championship	
11	CF: Noah	Cross Over in Sendai	Sendai, Japan	Naomichi Marufuji (c) defeated Takashi Sugiura to retain the GHC Heavyweight Championship	
11	ROH	Best in the World	Baltimore, Maryland	Bandido defeated Rush (c) to win the ROH World Championship	First ROH event with live fans since February 29, 2020 due to the COVID-19 pandemic
11	CMLL	Atlantis 38th Anniversary Show; Week 2	Mexico City, Mexico	Atlantis and Atlantis Jr. defeated Negro Casas and El Felino	
14	AEW	Fyter Fest; Night 1	Cedar Park, Texas	Darby Allin defeated Ethan Page in a Coffin match	Night 1 of a two-part special episode of Dynamite.
16	NJPW	Tag Team Turbulence; Week 1	Port Hueneme, California	Violence Unlimited (Brody King and Chris Dickinson) defeated Team Filthy (J. R. Kratos and Danny Limelight)	
16	WWE: SmackDown	SmackDown Live With Fans	Houston, Texas	Seth Rollins defeated Big E, Kevin Owens, and Shinsuke Nakamura in a fatal four-way match	First SmackDown held live with fans since March 6, 2020 due to the COVID-19 pandemic, marking WWE's resumption of live touring.
16	CMLL	Leyenda de Plata; Week 1	Mexico City, Mexico	Templario defeated Místico II in the Leyenda de Plata Tournament semi-finals	
17	Impact	Slammiversary	Nashville, Tennessee	Kenny Omega (c) defeated Sami Callihan in No Disqualification match to retain the Impact World Championship	First Impact Wrestling show to have live fans since March 2020 due to the COVID-19 pandemic.
18	WWE: Raw; SmackDown	Money in the Bank	Fort Worth, Texas	Roman Reigns (c) defeated Edge to retain the WWE Universal Championship	WWE's first PPV held outside of Florida since Elimination Chamber in March 2020 and the first following the end of the ThunderDome Era. Featured the return of John Cena.
18	CMLL	Atlantis 38th Anniversary Show; Week 3	Mexico City, Mexico	Último Guerrero and Gran Guerrero defeated Atlantis and Atlantis Jr.	
21	AEW	Fyter Fest; Night 2	Garland, Texas	Lance Archer defeated Jon Moxley (c) by knockout in a Texas Death match to win the IWGP United States Heavyweight Championship	Night 2 of a two-part special episode of Dynamite. Featured the AEW debut appearance of Chavo Guerrero Jr.
22	NJPW	Summer Struggle in Osaka	Osaka, Japan	Taichi defeated Tetsuya Naito	
23	NJPW	Summer Struggle in Osaka	Osaka, Japan	Tetsuya Naito defeated Zack Sabre Jr.	
23	NJPW	Tag Team Turbulence; Week 2	Port Hueneme, California	Tom Lawlor (c) defeated Satoshi Kojima to retain the Strong Openweight Championship	
23	WWE: SmackDown	SmackDown at Rolling Loud	Cleveland, Ohio; Miami, Florida	Jimmy Uso defeated Dominik Mysterio	Two matches were broadcast from the Rolling Loud hip hop music festival in Miami. The remainder of the show aired from the Rocket Mortgage FieldHouse.
23	CMLL	Leyenda de Plata; Week 2	Mexico City, Mexico	Titán defeated Carístico in the quarter-finals of the Leyenda de Plata tournament	
24	NJPW	Summer Struggle in Nagoya	Aichi, Japan	Hiroshi Tanahashi defeated Kenta	
25	NJPW	Wrestle Grand Slam in Tokyo Dome	Tokyo, Japan	Shingo Takagi (c) defeated Hiroshi Tanahashi to retain the IWGP World Heavyweight Championship	Originally scheduled to be held on May 29 but was postponed to July 25 because the Japanese government extended its state of emergency due to the COVID-19 pandemic.
25	Gleat: G Prowrestling	G Prowrestling Ver.1	Osaka, Japan	Hayato Tamura and Ryuichi Kawakami defeated El Lindaman and Soma Watanabe	Promoted as the official launch of Gleat's sub-brand, G Prowrestling.
25	CMLL	Atlantis 38th Anniversary Show; Week 4	Mexico City, Mexico	Atlantis vs. Blue Panther ended in a time-limit draw	
27	WWE: NXT	NXT on Syfy; Week 1	Orlando, Florida	Adam Cole defeated Bronson Reed	Aired as a special episode of NXT. First episode of NXT on Syfy since September 28, 2010.
28	AEW	Fight for the Fallen	Charlotte, North Carolina	"The Painmaker" Chris Jericho defeated Nick Gage in a No Rules match	Aired as a special episode of Dynamite.
30	NJPW	Tag Team Turbulence; Week 3	Port Hueneme, California	The Good Brothers (Karl Anderson and Doc Gallows) defeated Violence Unlimited (Brody King and Chris Dickinson) in the Tag Team Turbulence tournament final	
30	CMLL	Leyenda de Plata Finals; Week 3	Mexico City, Mexico	Titán defeated Templario to win the 2021 Leyenda de Plata tournament final	
31	Stardom	5 Star Grand Prix; Night 1	Yokohama, Japan	Maika defeated Utami Hayashishita in a 5 Star Grand Prix tournament match	
31	Impact	Homecoming	Nashville, Tennessee	Eddie Edwards defeated W. Morrissey in a Hardcore match	
(c) – denotes defending champion(s)

=== August ===
Date	Promotion(s)	Event	Location	Main Event	Notes
1	CF: Noah	Cross Over in Hiroshima	Hiroshima, Japan	Naomichi Marufuji (c) defeated Kazushi Sakuraba to retain the GHC Heavyweight Championship	
3	WWE: NXT	NXT on Syfy; Week 2	Orlando, Florida	Johnny Gargano defeated Dexter Lumis	Aired as a special episode of NXT. Second episode of NXT on Syfy since September 28, 2010.
4	Gleat: G Prowrestling	G Prowrestling Ver.2	Tokyo, Japan	#Stronghearts (El Lindaman and Issei Onitsuka) defeated Takanori Ito and Yu Iizuka	
4	AEW	Homecoming	Jacksonville, Florida	Malakai Black defeated Cody Rhodes	Aired as a special episode of Dynamite. Featured Malakai Black's AEW in-ring debut.
13	AEW	Rampage Debut	Pittsburgh, Pennsylvania	Dr. Britt Baker D.M.D. (c) defeated Red Velvet to retain the AEW Women's World Championship	This event marks the first weekly wrestling series to air Friday nights on a Turner channel since WCW Power Hour in 1994.
14	AAA	Triplemanía XXIX	Azcapotzalco, Mexico City, Mexico	Psycho Clown defeated Rey Escorpión in a Lucha de Apuestas Mask vs. Hair match	First event with the public since the beginning of the COVID-19 pandemic.
14	NJPW	Resurgence	Los Angeles, California	Hiroshi Tanahashi defeated Lance Archer (c) to win the IWGP United States Heavyweight Championship	
15	CF: Noah	Kawasaki Go!	Kawasaki, Japan	Takashi Sugiura (GHC National Champion) defeated Masato Tanaka (World Heavyweight Champion) in a Winner Takes All match	
16	NJPW	Fighting Spirit Unleashed	Long Beach, California	Tom Lawlor (c) defeated Lio Rush to retain the Strong Openweight Championship	
20	AEW	The First Dance	Chicago, Illinois	Jon Moxley defeated Daniel Garcia	Aired as a special episode of Rampage. Also featured the return of CM Punk to pro wrestling after a seven-year hiatus.
20	Impact	Emergence	Nashville, Tennessee	Christian Cage (c) defeated Brian Myers to retain the Impact World Championship	
20	NJPW	Summer Struggle USA	Port Hueneme, California	West Coast Wrecking Crew (Royce Isaacs and Jorel Nelson) defeated Violence Unlimited (Brody King and Chris Dickinson)	
20	ROH	Glory By Honor XVIII	Philadelphia, Pennsylvania	Bandido (c) defeated Flip Gordon to retain the ROH World Championship	
21	ROH	Glory By Honor XVIII	Philadelphia, Pennsylvania	Vincent defeated Matt Taven in a steel cage match to earn a shot at the ROH World Championship	
21	WWE: Raw; SmackDown	SummerSlam	Paradise, Nevada	Roman Reigns (c) defeated John Cena to retain the WWE Universal Championship	First SummerSlam to take place on a Saturday since the 1992 event, but the first to air live on a Saturday. Also the first to not be held on a Sunday since the 1994 event, which was held on a Monday. Featuring the return of Becky Lynch and Brock Lesnar.
21	CF: DDT	Wrestle Peter Pan	Kawasaki, Japan	Konosuke Takeshita defeated Jun Akiyama (c) to win the KO-D Openweight Championship	First Peter Pan to take place outside of Tokyo.
22	WWE: NXT	TakeOver 36	Orlando, Florida	Samoa Joe defeated Karrion Kross (c) to win the NXT Championship	Final TakeOver event.
27	NJPW	Summer Struggle USA	Port Hueneme, California	Juice Robinson, Lio Rush, Brody King and Chris Dickinson defeated Tom Lawlor, J. R. Kratos, Jorel Nelson and Royce Isaacs	
27	CMLL	CMLL Universal Amazons Championship Final	Mexico City, Mexico	La Jarochita defeated Dark Silueta to win the CMLL Universal Amazons Championship	
28	NWA	EmPowerrr	St. Louis, Missouri	Chelsea Green defeated Bianca Carrelli, Debbie Malenko, Lady Frost, Jamie Senegal, Jennacide, Kiera Hogan, Masha Slamovich, Thunder Kitty, and Tootie Lynn to win the NWA Women's Invitational Cup Gauntlet	NWA's first all-female event.
29	NWA	73rd Anniversary Show	St. Louis, Missouri	Trevor Murdoch defeated Nick Aldis (c) in a Title vs. Career match to win the NWA Worlds Heavyweight Championship	
(c) – denotes defending champion(s)

=== September ===
Date	Promotion(s)	Event	Location	Main Event	Notes
3	NJPW	BBQ Brawl	Port Hueneme, California	Hikuleo defeated Matt Morris	
4	NJPW	Wrestle Grand Slam in MetLife Dome	Tokorozawa, Japan	Hiroshi Tanahashi (c) defeated Kota Ibushi to retain the IWGP United States Heavyweight Championship	
5	NJPW	Wrestle Grand Slam in MetLife Dome	Tokorozawa, Japan	Shingo Takagi (c) defeated Evil to retain the IWGP World Heavyweight Championship	
5	AEW	All Out	Hoffman Estates, Illinois	Kenny Omega (c) defeated Christian Cage to retain the AEW World Championship	First AEW PPV held outside of Daily's Place in Jacksonville, Florida since the start of the COVID-19 pandemic in March 2020. This event featured CM Punk's first professional wrestling match in 7 years since leaving WWE, as well as the AEW debut appearances of Minoru Suzuki, Adam Cole, Ruby Soho, and Bryan Danielson (the latter two formerly known as Ruby Riott and Daniel Bryan, respectively, in WWE).
9	CMLL	International Women's Grand Prix	Mexico City, Mexico	Team Mexico (Dark Silueta) defeated Team International (Tsukushi)	
10	WWE: SmackDown	Super SmackDown Live from Madison Square Garden	New York City, New York	The Usos (Jey Uso and Jimmy Uso) (c) vs. The Street Profits (Angelo Dawkins and Montez Ford) for the SmackDown Tag Team Championship ended by disqualification	
10	NJPW	LA Dojo Showcase 2	Port Hueneme, California	Ren Narita defeated Karl Fredericks	
12	ROH	Death Before Dishonor XVIII	Philadelphia, Pennsylvania	Bandido (c) defeated Brody King, Demonic Flamita and EC3 in a four corner survival elimination match to retain the ROH World Championship	
14	WWE: NXT	NXT 2.0	Orlando, Florida	Tommaso Ciampa defeated L. A. Knight, Pete Dunne, and Von Wagner in a fatal four-way match to win the vacant NXT Championship	The first episode of the newly revamped NXT, featuring a new logo, remodeled Capitol Wrestling Center, and new theme song performed by Wale.
14	AJPW; BJW; CF: DDT; Noah; Dragon Gate; M-Pro; NJPW; Zero1; 2AW	Legacy: 70th Anniversary of Japan Pro Wrestling	Tokyo, Japan	Masaaki Mochizuki won an 18-man battle royal by lastly eliminating Isami Kodaka	Two-day show celebrating the 70th anniversary of the Japan Pro Wrestling Alliance in Korakuen Hall
15	AJPW; BJW; CF: DDT; Noah; Dragon Gate; M-Pro; NJPW; Zero1; 2AW	Legacy: 70th Anniversary of Japan Pro Wrestling	Tokyo, Japan	Kikutaro won a 15-man battle royal by lastly eliminating Jun Kasai	Two-day show celebrating the 70th anniversary of the Japan Pro Wrestling Alliance in Korakuen Hall
17	CMLL	Homenaje a Dos Leyendas	Mexico City, Mexico	Bárbaro Cavernario defeated El Felino in a Best two-out-of-three hair vs. hair match	
18	Impact	Victory Road	Nashville, Tennessee	Christian Cage (c) defeated Ace Austin to retain the Impact World Championship	
18	NJPW	Fighting Spirit Unleashed; Week 1	Long Beach, California	Juice Robinson vs. Hikuleo in a Tables match	Taped on August 16.
22	AEW	Dynamite: Grand Slam	Queens, New York	Dr. Britt Baker, D.M.D. (c) defeated Ruby Soho to retain the AEW Women's World Championship	Aired live as a special episode of Dynamite. AEW's New York City debut. The first part of AEW's two-part Grand Slam event.
22	AEW	Rampage: Grand Slam	Queens, New York	Jon Moxley and Eddie Kingston defeated Suzuki-gun (Minoru Suzuki and Lance Archer) in a Lights Out match	Aired on tape delay on September 24 as a special episode of Rampage. The second part of AEW's two-part Grand Slam event.
24	CMLL	88th Anniversary Show	Mexico City, Mexico	La Jarochita and Lluvia (c) defeated Dark Silueta and Reyna Isis to retain the Mexican National Women's Tag Team Championship	
25	NJPW	Fighting Spirit Unleashed; Week 2	Long Beach, California	Fred Rosser vs. Ren Narita	Taped on August 16.
26	WWE: Raw; SmackDown	Extreme Rules	Columbus, Ohio	Roman Reigns (c) defeated "The Demon" Finn Bálor to retain the WWE Universal Championship	2020's Extreme Rules was originally scheduled to be held in San Jose, California, but was relocated due to the COVID-19 pandemic. The SAP Center announced they would instead host the 2021 event. The 2021 event had been reported to be held on July 18, but that date was instead given to Money in the Bank. The event was then moved to September 26 in Ohio.
(c) – denotes defending champion(s)

=== October ===
Date	Promotion(s)	Event	Location	Main Event	Notes
1	WWE: Raw; SmackDown	2021 WWE Draft; Night 1	Baltimore, Maryland	Sasha Banks defeated Bianca Belair	First night of the annual WWE Draft, where wrestlers were drafted between the Raw and SmackDown brands. Aired as an episode of SmackDown.
2	NJPW	Fighting Spirit Unleashed Week 3	Long Beach, California	Tom Lawlor (c) defeated Lio Rush to retain the Strong Openweight Championship	Taped on August 16.
2	MLW	Fightland	Philadelphia, Pennsylvania	Alexander Hammerstone (National) defeated Jacob Fatu (World) in a Title vs. Title No Disqualification match for the MLW World Heavyweight Championship and the MLW National Openweight Championship	
4	WWE: Raw; SmackDown	2021 WWE Draft; Night 2	Nashville, Tennessee	Bianca Belair defeated Charlotte Flair (c) by disqualification in a Raw Women's Championship match	Second night of the annual WWE Draft, where wrestlers were drafted between the Raw and SmackDown brands. Aired as an episode of Raw.
6	AEW	2nd Anniversary Show	Philadelphia, Pennsylvania	Adam Page defeated Andrade El Idolo, Jon Moxley, Lance Archer, Matt Hardy, and Orange Cassidy in the Casino Ladder match to earn a match for the AEW World Championship	Celebrated the second anniversary of Dynamite.
8	WWE: SmackDown	SmackDown Season Premiere	San Jose, California	Finn Bálor defeated Cesaro in a 2021 King of the Ring first-round match	The 2021–22 season premiere of SmackDown. Featured King of the Ring and Queen's Crown tournament quarter-final matches.
9	TJPW	Wrestle Princess II	Tokyo, Japan	Miyu Yamashita (c) defeated Maki Itoh to retain the Princess of Princess Championship	
9	AAA	Héroes Inmortales XIV	Orizaba, Mexico	La Empresa (Puma King, Sam Adonis, and DMT Azul) defeated Dave the Clown and Los Psycho Circus (Psycho Clown, and Murder Clown) in Steel Cage Trios match	
9	Gleat: Lidet UWF	Lidet UWF Ver.1	Tokyo, Japan	Daichi Hashimoto defeated Yu Iizuka in a UWF Rules match	Promoted as the official launch of Gleat's Lidet UWF sub-brand; it was an UWF International revival show held by Kiyoshi Tamura.
9	Stardom	Stardom 10th Anniversary Grand Final Osaka Dream Cinderella	Nagoya, Japan	Utami Hayashishita (c) defeated Takumi Iroha to retain the World of Stardom Championship	First joshi puroresu event hosted by the Osaka-jō Hall since 1995.
9	Impact	Knockouts Knockdown	Nashville, Tennessee	Decay (c) defeated The Influence (Madison Rayne and Tenille Dashwood) for the Impact Knockouts Tag Team Championship	
9	NJPW	Autumn Attack Week 1	Garland, Texas	Jay White defeated Robbie Eagles	Taped on September 25.
10	CF: Noah	Noah Grand Square 2021	Osaka, Japan	Katsuhiko Nakajima defeated Naomichi Marufuji (c) to win the GHC Heavyweight Championship	
15	WWE: SmackDown	Supersized SmackDown	Ontario, California	Sasha Banks defeated Becky Lynch	Special two-and-a-half-hour edition of SmackDown.
16	AEW	Saturday Night Dynamite Week 1	Miami, Florida	Bryan Danielson defeated Bobby Fish	Saturday airing of Dynamite (due to TNT coverage of the 2021–22 NHL season).
16	NJPW	Autumn Attack Week 2	Garland, Texas	Will Ospreay defeated Karl Fredericks	Taped on September 25.
21	WWE: Raw; SmackDown	Crown Jewel	Riyadh, Saudi Arabia	Roman Reigns (c) defeated Brock Lesnar to retain the WWE Universal Championship	Featured the finals of the King of the Ring and inaugural Queen's Crown tournaments.
22	GCW	Bloodsport 7	Los Angeles, California	Minoru Suzuki defeated Chris Dickinson	
23	AEW	Saturday Night Dynamite Week 2	Orlando, Florida	Cody Rhodes defeated Malakai Black	Saturday airing of Dynamite (due to TNT coverage of the 2021–22 NHL season).
23	NJPW	Autumn Attack Week 3	Garland, Texas	Juice Robinson defeated Hikuleo in a Texas Bullrope match	Taped on September 26.
23	Impact	Bound for Glory	Sunrise Manor, Nevada	Josh Alexander defeated Christian Cage (c) to win the Impact World Championship	
24	NWA	By Any Means Necessary	Oak Grove, Kentucky	Jax Dane defeated Crimson in a Steel Cage match	
25	WWE: Raw	Raw Season Premiere	Houston, Texas	Seth Rollins defeated Finn Bálor, Kevin Owens, and Rey Mysterio in a four-way ladder match to become the number one contender for the WWE Championship	The 2021–22 season premiere of Raw.
26	WWE: NXT	Halloween Havoc	Orlando, Florida	Tommaso Ciampa (c) defeated Bron Breakker to retain the NXT Championship	Special Halloween-themed episode of NXT 2.0. Featured a special appearance by Chucky, who served as a host of the show.
30	NJPW	Autumn Attack Week 4	Garland, Texas	Suzuki-gun (Lance Archer and Minoru Suzuki) defeated Team Filthy (Royce Isaacs and Tom Lawlor)	Taped on September 26.
31	FMW-E	Destiny	Trenton, New Jersey	Atsushi Onita defeated Matt Tremont in an Exploding Barbed Wire Deathmatch	A co-promoted event with the Hardcore Hustle Organization, it was the first event promoted in the United States by FMW-E in its current incarnation.
(c) – denotes defending champion(s)

=== November ===
Date	Promotion(s)	Event	Location	Main Event	Notes
2	CMLL	Día de Muertos Day 1	Mexico City, Mexico	Atlantis Jr. defeated Volador Jr. in an elimination match	
3	Stardom	Kawasaki Super Wars	Kawasaki, Japan	Utami Hayashishita (c) defeated Hazuki to retain the World of Stardom Championship	
5	CMLL	Día de Muertos Day 2	Mexico City, Mexico	El Terrible (c) defeated Atlantis Jr. in a Best two-out-of-three falls match in the 2021 Rey del Inframundo championship Tournament Final	
6	MLW	War Chamber	Philadelphia, Pennsylvania	The Hammerheads (Alexander Hammerstone, EJ Nduka, Matanza Duran, Richard Holliday, and Savio Vega) defeated Contra Unit (Ikuro Kwon, Jacob Fatu, Mads Krügger, Sentai Death Squad #1, and Sentai Death Squad #2) in a War Chamber match	The event was originally scheduled for September 11 in Dallas, Texas but was postponed due to a surge of COVID-19 cases in the Dallas–Fort Worth metroplex.
6	CMLL	Arena Coliseo Grand Reopening	Mexico City, Mexico	Los Guerreros Laguneros (Gran Guerrero and Ultimo Guerrero) and Atlantis Jr. defeated El Felino, Místico and Volador Jr. in a Best Two Out Of Three Falls Six Man Tag Team Match	First Show in Arena Coliseo since COVID-19 pandemic
6	NJPW	Power Struggle	Osaka, Japan	Shingo Takagi (c) defeated Zack Sabre Jr. to retain the IWGP World Heavyweight Championship	
6	NJPW	New Japan Showdown Week 1	Philadelphia, Pennsylvania	Clark Connors and Ren Narita defeated United Empire (Will Ospreay and TJP)	Taped on October 16.
13	CF: Noah	Noah Demolition Stage 2021	Yokohama, Japan	M's Alliance (Keiji Muto and Naomichi Marufuji) defeated Kaito Kiyomiya and Masa Kitamiya (c) to win the GHC Tag Team Championship	
13	AEW	Full Gear	Minneapolis, Minnesota	Adam Page defeated Kenny Omega (c) to win the AEW World Championship	The event was originally scheduled to be held on November 6 in St. Louis, Missouri, but was moved to avoid competition with UFC 268 and Canelo Álvarez vs. Caleb Plant.
13	NJPW	New Japan Showdown Week 2	Philadelphia, Pennsylvania	Minoru Suzuki defeated Chris Dickinson	Taped on October 16.
13	NJPW	Battle in the Valley	San Jose, California	Tomohiro Ishii defeated Jay White (c) to win the NEVER Openweight Championship	
14	ROH	Honor For All	Baltimore, Maryland	Bandido defeated Demonic Flamita in a No Disqualification match	
14	WWE: Raw; SmackDown	Tribute to the Troops	Ontario, California	Roman Reigns defeated Shinsuke Nakamura in a singles match	Taped on October 15. First Tribute to the Troops to not air in December.
19	CMLL; NJPW	CMLL vs. NJPW Day 1	Mexico City, Mexico	United Empire (TJP and Jeff Cobb) defeated Volador Jr. and Atlantis Jr.	
20	CMLL; NJPW	CMLL vs. NJPW Day 2	Mexico City, Mexico	United Empire (TJP and Jeff Cobb) defeated El Terrible and Euforia	
20	Impact	Turning Point	Sunrise Manor, Nevada	Moose (c) defeated Eddie Edwards in a Full Metal Mayhem match to retain the Impact World Championship	
20	NJPW	New Japan Showdown Week 3	Philadelphia, Pennsylvania	TJP defeated Clark Connors	Taped on October 17.
21	WWE: Raw; SmackDown	Survivor Series	Brooklyn, New York	Roman Reigns (SmackDown's Universal Champion) defeated Big E (Raw's WWE Champion) in a Champion vs. Champion non-title singles match	
21	CMLL; NJPW	CMLL vs. NJPW Day 3	Mexico City, Mexico	United Empire (Jeff Cobb and TJP) defeated El Terrible and Hechicero	
22	CMLL; NJPW	CMLL vs. NJPW Day 4	Puebla, Mexico	Volador Jr. and Fugaz vs TJP and Atlantis Jr.	
24	AEW	Thanksgiving Eve Dynamite	Chicago, Illinois	Andrade El Idolo, Malakai Black, FTR (Dax Harwood and Cash Wheeler) defeated Pac, Penta El Cero M, Rey Fenix, and Cody Rhodes	Thanksgiving themed episode of Dynamite.
26	WWE: SmackDown	Thanksgiving SmackDown	Greensboro, North Carolina	Sami Zayn won a Black Friday Battle Royal to become the #1 contender for the WWE Universal Championship	Special Thanksgiving-themed episode of SmackDown.
26	CMLL	Torneo de Leyenda de Azul	Mexico City, Mexico	Volador Jr. (c) defeated TJP to retain the NWA World Historic Welterweight Championship.	
27	NJPW	New Japan Showdown Week 4	Philadelphia, Pennsylvania	Suzuki-gun (Minoru Suzuki and Lance Archer) defeated Jon Moxley and Eddie Kingston in a Philadelphia Street fight	Taped on October 17.
27	Stardom	Tokyo Super Wars	Tokyo, Japan	Utami Hayashishita (c) defeated Maika to retain the World of Stardom Championship	
28	CF: Noah	Noah The Best 2021	Tokyo, Japan	Katsuhiko Nakajima (Heavyweight) vs. Kenoh (National) ended in a time-limit draw in a Winner takes all match for the GHC Heavyweight Championship and GHC National Championship	
(c) – denotes defending champion(s)

=== December ===
Date	Promotion(s)	Event	Location	Main Event	Notes
3	The Crash; MLW	Azteca	Tijuana, Baja California, Mexico	Pagano and Alexander Hammerstone defeated King Muertes and Taurus in aa Apocalypto match	
4	AAA	Triplemanía Regia II	Monterrey, Mexico	El Hijo del Vikingo defeated Samuray del Sol, Jay Lethal, Bobby Fish, and Bandido in a five-way match for the vacant AAA Mega Championship	Was originally to be held on October 10, 2020, but was postponed due to the COVID-19 pandemic.
4	NWA	Hard Times	Atlanta, Georgia, United States	Trevor Murdoch (c) defeated Mike Knox to retain the NWA Worlds Heavyweight Championship	
4	NJPW	Detonation Week 1	Riverside, California	Hikuleo and Jay White defeated Yuya Uemura and Alex Zayne	Taped on November 15.
5	WWE: NXT	WarGames	Orlando, Florida	Team 2.0 (Bron Breakker, Carmelo Hayes, Grayson Waller, and Tony D'Angelo) (with Trick Williams) defeated Team Black & Gold (Tommaso Ciampa, Johnny Gargano, Pete Dunne, and L. A. Knight) in a WarGames match	NXT's first non-TakeOver event to air on PPV and the WWE Network since Halftime Heat in February 2019.
9	NJPW	Nemesis	Los Angeles, California	Christopher Daniels vs. Jay White	
11	ROH	Final Battle	Baltimore, Maryland	Jonathan Gresham defeated Jay Lethal to win the vacant ROH World Championship	This was the final ROH event until at least April 2022 as ROH went on hiatus to restructure the promotion.
15	AEW	Winter Is Coming	Garland, Texas	MJF defeated Dante Martin in a singles match to win the AEW Dynamite Diamond Ring	Aired as a special episode of Dynamite.
17	WWE: SmackDown	Christmas Eve SmackDown	Chicago, Illinois	Drew McIntyre and The New Day (Sir Kofi Kingston and King Woods) defeated Madcap Moss and The Usos (Jimmy Uso and Jey Uso) in a Miracle on 34th Street Fight	Aired on tape delay on December 24 as a special episode of SmackDown.
18	Impact	Throwback Throwdown II	Louisville, Kentucky	Santa Claus (Willie Mack) defeated Sex Ferguson (Doc Gallows) (c) by pinfall in a North Pole Street Fight for the IPWF International Commonwealth Television Championship	
18	Stardom	Osaka Super Wars	Osaka, Japan	MaiHimePoi (Maika, Natsupoi, and Himeka) (c) defeated Stars (Mayu Iwatani, Hazuki, and Koguma) in a six-woman tag team ladder match to retain the ¥10 Million Unit Tournament briefcase and the Artist of Stardom Championship	
22	AEW	Dynamite: Holiday Bash	Greensboro, North Carolina	CM Punk, Sting, and Darby Allin defeated The Pinnacle (MJF and FTR (Cash Wheeler and Dax Harwood)) in a six-man tag team match	Aired live as a special episode of Dynamite. The first part of AEW's two-part Holiday Bash event.
22	AEW	Rampage: Holiday Bash	Greensboro, North Carolina	Cody Rhodes defeated Sammy Guevara (c) in a singles match to win the AEW TNT Championship	Aired on tape delay on December 25 as a special episode of Rampage. The second part of AEW's two-part Holiday Bash event.
25	CMLL	Espacial De Navidad	Mexico City, Mexico	Místico (c) defeated Averno to retain the NWA World Historic Middleweight Championship	
26	CF: DDT	Never Mind 2021	Tokyo, Japan	Konosuke Takeshita (c) defeated Yuji Okabayashi to retain the KO-D Openweight Championship	
29	Stardom	Dream Queendom	Tokyo, Japan	Syuri defeated Utami Hayashishita (c) in a winner-takes-all match to win the World of Stardom Championship and retain the SWA World Championship	
29	AEW	Dynamite: New Year's Smash	Jacksonville, Florida	Adam Cole, Bobby Fish, and Kyle O'Reilly defeated Best Friends (Chuck Taylor and Trent Beretta) and Orange Cassidy	Aired live as a special episode of Dynamite and was the show's final episode on TNT before the move to TBS on January 5, 2022. The first part of AEW's two-part New Year's Smash event, held as part of AEW's annual year-end party for talent and staff in Jacksonville.
29	AEW	Rampage: New Year's Smash	Jacksonville, Florida	Cody Rhodes (c) defeated Ethan Page to retain the AEW TNT Championship	Aired on tape delay on December 31 as a special episode of Rampage. The second part of AEW's two-part New Year's Smash event.
31	WWE: SmackDown	Best of 2021	TBD		A year-in-review episode, which aired on FS1 due to Fox's New Year's Eve programming. WWE initially announced plans to air a live SmackDown for New Year's Eve in Charlotte, but these plans were scrapped.
(c) – denotes defending champion(s)

=== Events affected by COVID-19 ===
==== Canceled events ====
Scheduled date	Promotion(s)	Event	Location	Notes
May 15	NJPW	Wrestle Grand Slam in Yokohama Stadium	Yokohama, Japan	The event was originally planned to be rescheduled after being postponed due to the Japanese government's extension of its COVID-19 pandemic state of emergency, but was cancelled on June 16.
June 20	WWE: NXT UK	TakeOver: Dublin	Dublin, Ireland	This event was originally scheduled to take place on April 26, 2020. It was then rescheduled for October 25, 2020, but was again rescheduled for June 20, 2021 due to the COVID-19 pandemic. However, on April 30, the event was canceled. This would have been the first NXT UK TakeOver event held outside the United Kingdom.
September 26	WWE: Raw; SmackDown	Clash of Champions	Columbus, Ohio	The event was originally intended to be held on September 26 in Columbus, Ohio but that date was given to Extreme Rules. The event was quietly canceled for 2021.
December 19	WWE: Raw; SmackDown	TLC: Tables, Ladders & Chairs	Rosemont, Illinois	The event was originally intended to be held on December 19 in Rosemont, Illinois, but was canceled in favor of an event called Day 1, a pay-per-view occurring on January 1, 2022, in Atlanta, Georgia.

== Notable events ==
- March 15 – AEW Dark: Elevation premiered on YouTube
- March 18 – Under a new agreement between WWE and NBCUniversal, the WWE Network became a premium channel under Peacock in the United States. Following a brief transitional period, the standalone version of the WWE Network in the U.S. shut down on April 4. This did not affect the service outside of the U.S.
- April 9 – All Elite Wrestling held its first-ever house show, "The House Always Wins."
- May 30 – AEW Double or Nothing is the first major wrestling show to operate at full venue capacity during the COVID-19 pandemic
- June 4 – Beginning with this day's episode of Viernes Espectacular, Consejo Mundial de Lucha Libre resumed a live touring schedule after over a year of producing shows in Arena México without full capacity due to the COVID-19 pandemic.
- July 7 – Beginning with this day's episode of AEW Dynamite, which aired as a special episode called "Road Rager", All Elite Wrestling resumed a live touring schedule after over a year of producing shows from Daily's Place in Jacksonville, Florida, becoming the first major promotion to resume touring during the COVID-19 pandemic. It was also the first in AEW's "Welcome Back" tour, which continued with Fyter Fest (July 14 and 21) and concluded with Fight for the Fallen (July 28).
- July 16 – Beginning with this day's episode of WWE SmackDown, WWE resumed a live touring schedule for their Raw and SmackDown brands after nearly a year of producing shows from the WWE ThunderDome bio-secure bubble.
- August 13 – AEW Rampage premiered on TNT, marking the first weekly wrestling series to air Friday nights on a Turner channel since WCW Power Hour in 1994.
- August 20 - CM Punk returned to professional wrestling for the first time in seven years on a live special episode of AEW Rampage titled The First Dance.
- October 27 – Ring of Honor announced that they were going on hiatus until at least April 2022, and all talent and staff would be released from their contracts after Final Battle in December.
- December 7 – WWE established the WWE NIL program, which exclusively supports U.S. college athletes who decide to train as wrestlers.

== Accomplishments and tournaments ==
=== AAA ===
Accomplishment	Winner	Date won	Notes
Rey de Reyes	Laredo Kid	May 1	Defeated El Texano Jr., Aero Star, Drago, Abismo Negro Jr., El Hijo del Vikingo, Myzteziz Jr., and Murder Clown in the Rey de Reyes final

=== AEW ===
Accomplishment	Winner(s)	Date won	Notes
AEW Women's World Championship Eliminator Tournament	Ryo Mizunami	March 3	Defeated Nyla Rose in the tournament final to earn an AEW Women's World Championship match at Revolution, but was unsuccessful in winning the championship.
Casino Tag Team Royale	Death Triangle (Pac and Rey Fénix)	March 7	Fénix last eliminated Jungle Boy of Jurassic Express to earn an AEW World Tag Team Championship match for his team. Death Triangle received their match on the April 14 episode of Dynamite, but were unsuccessful in winning the championship.
Face of the Revolution Ladder Match	Scorpio Sky	March 7	Defeated Cody Rhodes, Penta El Zero Miedo, Lance Archer, Max Caster, and Ethan Page to earn an AEW TNT Championship match against Darby Allin on the March 10 episode of Dynamite, but was unsuccessful in winning the championship.
Casino Battle Royale (Men)	Jungle Boy	May 30	Last eliminated Christian Cage to earn an AEW World Championship match. Jungle Boy received his match on the June 26 episode of Dynamite, but was unsuccessful in winning the championship.
AEW World Tag Team Championship Eliminator Tournament	The Lucha Brothers (Penta El Zero Miedo and Rey Fénix)	August 25 (aired August 27)	Defeated Jurassic Express (Jungle Boy and Luchasaurus) in the tournament final to earn an AEW World Tag Team Championship match at All Out, where they defeated The Young Bucks (Matt Jackson and Nick Jackson) in a steel cage match to win the championship.
Casino Battle Royale (Women)	Ruby Soho	September 5	Last eliminated Thunder Rosa to earn an AEW Women's World Championship match. Soho received her match on the September 22 special episode of Dynamite titled Grand Slam, but was unsuccessful in winning the championship.
Casino Ladder Match	Adam Page	October 6	Defeated Andrade El Idolo, Jon Moxley, Lance Archer, Matt Hardy, Orange Cassidy, and Pac to earn an AEW World Championship match at Full Gear, where Page defeated Kenny Omega to win the championship.
AEW World Championship Eliminator Tournament	Bryan Danielson	November 13	Defeated Miro in the tournament final to earn an AEW World Championship match on the special Winter Is Coming episode of Dynamite on December 15, but the match ended in a draw, resulting in a rematch scheduled for the January 5, 2022, episode of Dynamite.
Dynamite Diamond Battle Royale	MJF and Dante Martin	December 8	12-man battle royal to determine the two participants in the Dynamite Diamond Final for the AEW Dynamite Diamond Ring. MJF and Martin co-won the battle royal to face each other at Dynamite: Winter Is Coming the following week where MJF defeated Martin to win the ring.

=== AJPW ===
Accomplishment	Winner(s)	Date won	Notes
Champion Carnival	Jake Lee	May 3	Defeated Kento Miyahara in the tournament final to win the 2021 Champion Carnival.
Jr. Battle Of Glory	Francesco Akira	June 2	Defeated El Lindaman in the tournament final to win the 2021 Jr. Battle Of Glory.
Royal Road Ōdō Tournament	Suwama	August 29	

=== CMLL ===
Accomplishment	Winner(s)	Date won	Notes
La Copa Junior VIP	Angel de Oro	March 26	Defeated Caristico in the tournament final to win the 2021 La Copa Junior VIP.
Copa Dinastías	Los Hermanos Panther (Blue Panther Jr. and Black Panther)	May 28	Defeated Volador Jr. and Flyer in the tournament final to win the Copa Dinastías.
Torneo Increíble de Parejas	Templario and Volador Jr.	June 25	Defeated Caristico and Virus in the tournament final to win the Torneo Increíble de Parejas.
Leyenda de Plata	Titán	July 30	Defeated Templario in the tournament final to win the 2021 Leyenda de Plata.
CMLL Universal Amazonas Championship	La Jarochita	August 27	Defeated Dark Silueta in the tournament final to win the 2021 CMLL Universal Amazonas Championship.
Copa Independencia	Volador Jr.	September 17	Defeated Gran Guerrero in the tournament final to win the 2021 Copa Independencia.
International Women's Gran Prix	Dark Silueta	October 8	Last eliminated Tsukushi to win for Team Mexico.
Rey del Inframundo championship	El Terrible	November 5	Defeated Atlantis Jr. in the tournament final to retain the 2021 Rey del Inframundo championship.
Leyenda de Azul	El Soberano Jr.	November 26	Defeated Atlantis Jr. in the tournament final to win the 2021 Leyenda de Azul.
Gran Alternativa	El Coyote and Euforia	December 25	Defeated Atlantis Jr. and Sangre Imperial in the tournament final to win the 2021 Gran Alternativa.

=== DDT ===
Accomplishment	Winner(s)	Date won	Notes
Ultimate Tag League	The37Kamiina (Konosuke Takeshita and Shunma Katsumata)	May 27	Defeated Damnation (Daisuke Sasaki and Yuji Hino) in a tie-breaker to win the 2021 Ultimate Tag League.
King of DDT	Konosuke Takeshita	July 4	Defeated Yuji Hino in the tournament final to win the King of DDT 2021.
D-Oh Grand Prix	Konosuke Takeshita	December 5	Defeated Yuki Ueno in the tournament final to win the D-Oh Grand Prix 2021 II.

=== Dragon Gate ===
Accomplishment	Winner(s)	Date won	Notes
King of Gate	Kzy	June 3	Defeated Kota Minoura in the final to win the King of Gate 2021.

=== MLW ===
Accomplishment	Winner(s)	Date won	Notes
Battle Riot	Alexander Hammerstone	July 10	Last eliminated Mads Krügger to earn an MLW World Heavyweight Championship match. He defeated Jacob Fatu in a title vs. title no disqualification match at Fightland with his MLW National Openweight Championship also on the line
Opera Cup	Davey Richards	November 6	Defeated TJP in the finals to win the 2021 Opera Cup

=== Gleat ===
Accomplishment	Winner(s)	Date won	Notes
UWF Rules Tournament	Takanori Ito	March 18	Defeated Yu Iizuka in the final to win the tournament.
G Prowrestling Tournament	Soma Watanabe	April 15	Defeated Kaz Hayashi in the final to win the tournament.

=== Impact ===
Accomplishment	Winner(s)	Date won	Notes
Super X Cup	Ace Austin	January 9	Defeated Blake Christian in the tournament final to win the Super X Cup Trophy.
Impact Knockouts Tag Team Championship Tournament	Fire 'N Flava (Kiera Hogan and Tasha Steelz)	January 16	Defeated Havok and Nevaeh in the tournament finals to win the revived Impact Knockouts Tag Team Championship; the title was deactivated in 2013.
Homecoming King and Queen Tournament	Deonna Purrazzo and Matthew Rehwoldt	July 31	Defeated Decay (Rosemary and Crazzy Steve) in the tournament finals to be crowned Homecoming King and Queen
Call Your Shot Gauntlet	Moose	October 23	Last eliminated Matt Cardona to win the Call Your Shot Trophy for a championship match of his choosing. Moose would use the trophy later in the night on Josh Alexander to win the Impact World Championship

=== NJPW ===
Accomplishment	Winner(s)	Date won	Notes
New Japan Cup	Will Ospreay	March 21	Defeated Shingo Takagi in the tournament final to earn an IWGP World Heavyweight Championship match at Sakura Genesis.
New Japan Cup USA	Tom Lawlor	April 23	Defeated Brody King to become the inaugural Strong Openweight Champion.

=== NWA ===
Accomplishment	Winner(s)	Date won	Notes
Champions Series	Team Pope/Velvet Sky (Trevor Murdoch, Jennacide, Jax Dane, Cyon, and Colby Corino)	N/A (aired August 10)	Defeated Team Kamille/Austin Idol (Thom Latimer, Kenzie Paige, J. R. Kratos, Matthew Mims, and Sal Rinauro) in the finals block to earn future title opportunities (or their team's protection in the captains' terms).: Murdoch would use his shot to win the NWA Worlds Heavyweight Championship from Nick Aldis in a Title vs. Career match at NWA 73.; Jennacide used her shot with Paola Blaze to enter a match for The Hex's NWA World Women's Tag Team Championship on the Hard Times 2 pre-show, but they were unsuccessful.; Cyon used his shot at Hard Times 2 against Tyrus for the NWA World Television Championship in a No Disqualification match with The Pope as special guest referee, but was unsuccessful.; Dane would use his shot to win the NWA National Championship from Anthony Mayweather at the Crockett Cup.; Pope used his opportunity to challenge Matt Cardona for the NWA Worlds Heavyweight Championship on the April 13, 2022 "SuperPowerrr" episode of NWA Powerrr, but was unsuccessful. *Corino used his shot for Homicide's NWA World Junior Heavyweight Championship at NWA Alwayz Ready, but was unsuccessful.; Sky relinquished her opportunity to Tim Storm on the August 16, 2022, edition of Powerrr. However, on October 18, Storm was unable to use his opportunity in the time frame it had left, so a match between Chelsea Green and Angelina Love was scheduled that night, where Green pinned Love. Green would utilize the opportunity to enter the NWA World Women's Championship match with champion Kamille and KiLynn King at Hard Times 3 but was unsuccessful in winning the title.
NWA World Women's Tag Team Championship tournament	The Hex (Allysin Kay and Marti Belle)	August 28	Defeated KiLynn King and Red Velvet in the tournament final to win the reactivated NWA World Women's Tag Team Championship. The title has been inactive since 1984
NWA Women's Invitational Cup	Chelsea Green	August 28	Last eliminated Tootie Lynn in a gauntlet match to win the NWA Women's Invitational Cup trophy and an NWA World Women's Championship match at NWA 73, but was unsuccessful
NWA World Tag Team Championship Eliminator Tournament	The End (Odinson and Parrow)	N/A (aired November 16)	Defeated Hawx Aerie (Luke Hawx and P. J. Hawx) in the tournament final to win an NWA World Tag Team Championship match at NWA Hard Times 2, but were unsuccessful

=== ROH ===
Accomplishment	Winner(s)	Date won	Notes
Survival of the Fittest	Bandido	June 26	Defeated Eli Isom, Chris Dickinson, Rhett Titus, Brian Johnson and Demonic Flamita in a six-way elimination match to win. Bandido would go on to defeat Rush and win the ROH World Championship at Best in the World.
Honor Rumble	Alex Zayne	September 12	Last eliminated P. J. Black to win an ROH World Championship match on the November 6 Ring of Honor Wrestling, but was unsuccessful
ROH Women's World Championship Tournament	Rok-C	September 12	Defeated Miranda Alize in the tournament final to become the inaugural ROH Women's World Champion

=== Noah ===
Accomplishment	Winner(s)	Date won	Notes
N-1 Victory	Katsuhiko Nakajima	August 1	Defeated Kenoh in the finals to win the 2021 N-1 Victory tournament.

=== Sendai Girls ===
Accomplishment	Winner	Date won	Notes
Jaja Uma Tournament	Haruka Umesaki	January 9	

=== WWE ===
Accomplishment	Winner(s)	Date won	Notes
Royal Rumble (Women)	Bianca Belair	January 31	Winner received their choice of a championship match for either the Raw Women's Championship, SmackDown Women's Championship, or NXT Women's Championship at WrestleMania 37; Belair last eliminated Rhea Ripley to win and chose her own brand's SmackDown Women's Championship, which she subsequently won from Sasha Banks at the event.
Royal Rumble (Men)	Edge	January 31	Winner received their choice of a championship match for either Raw's WWE Championship, SmackDown's Universal Championship, or the NXT Championship at WrestleMania 37; Edge from Raw last eliminated Randy Orton to win and chose the Universal Championship, but was unsuccessful in winning the title at the event.
Dusty Rhodes Tag Team Classic (Women)	Dakota Kai and Raquel González	February 14	Defeated Ember Moon and Shotzi Blackheart in the tournament final to win the inaugural Women's Dusty Rhodes Tag Team Classic Trophy and a match for the WWE Women's Tag Team Championship on the March 3 episode of NXT, but were unsuccessful in winning the championship due to a controversial finish. This resulted in them being named the inaugural holders of the NXT Women's Tag Team Championship.
Dusty Rhodes Tag Team Classic (Men)	MSK (Nash Carter and Wes Lee)	February 14	Defeated Grizzled Young Veterans (James Drake and Zack Gibson) in the tournament final to win the Men's Dusty Rhodes Tag Team Classic Trophy and a match for the NXT Tag Team Championship on the March 3 episode of NXT, but Lee suffered a storyline injury leading up to the match. They would later win a triple threat tag team match involving Grizzled Young Veterans and Legado del Fantasma (Joaquin Wilde and Raul Mendoza) at TakeOver: Stand & Deliver Night 1 to win the vacant titles (vacated after co-champion Danny Burch suffered a shoulder injury).
André the Giant Memorial Battle Royal	Jey Uso	April 2 (aired April 9)	Last eliminated Shinsuke Nakamura to win the André the Giant Memorial Trophy.
Money in the Bank ladder match (Women)	Nikki A.S.H.	July 18	Defeated Asuka, Naomi, Alexa Bliss, Liv Morgan, Zelina Vega, Natalya, and Tamina for a women's world championship match contract. Nikki cashed in the contract on the July 19 episode of Raw and won the Raw Women's Championship from Charlotte Flair, who had just retained the title in a match against Rhea Ripley by disqualification.
Money in the Bank ladder match (Men)	Big E	July 18	Defeated Ricochet, John Morrison, Riddle, Drew McIntyre, Kevin Owens, King Nakamura, and Seth Rollins for a world championship match contract. Big E cashed in the contract on the September 13 episode of Raw and won the WWE Championship from Bobby Lashley, who had just retained the title in a match against Randy Orton.
King of the Ring tournament	Xavier Woods	October 21	Defeated Finn Bálor in the tournament final to become the King of the Ring; he subsequently changed his ring name to King Woods.
Queen's Crown tournament	Zelina Vega	October 21	Defeated Doudrop in the tournament final to become the inaugural Queen; she subsequently changed her ring name to Queen Zelina.

=== Zero1 ===
Accomplishment	Winner(s)	Date won	Notes
Fire Festival	Takuya Sugawara	August 1	Defeated Ayato Yoshida to win the 2021 Fire Festival.

== Title changes ==
=== AEW ===
AEW World Championship
Incoming champion – Kenny Omega
Date	Winner	Event/Show	Note(s)
November 13	Adam Page	Full Gear	

AEW TNT Championship
Incoming champion – Darby Allin
Date	Winner	Event/Show	Note(s)
May 12	Miro	Dynamite	
September 29	Sammy Guevara	Dynamite	
December 22 (aired December 25)	Cody Rhodes	Holiday Bash; Night 2	

AEW Women's World Championship
Incoming champion – Hikaru Shida
Date	Winner	Event/Show	Note(s)
May 30	Dr. Britt Baker D.M.D.	Double or Nothing	

AEW World Tag Team Championship
Incoming champions – The Young Bucks (Matt Jackson and Nick Jackson)
Date	Winner	Event/Show	Note(s)
September 5	Lucha Brothers (Penta El Zero Miedo and Rey Fénix)	All Out	Steel Cage match.

FTW Championship
Incoming champion – Brian Cage
Title not officially sanctioned by AEW.
Date	Winner	Event/Show	Note(s)
July 14	Ricky Starks	Fyter Fest; Night 1	

=== CMLL ===
CMLL World Heavyweight Championship
Incoming champion – Último Guerrero
Date	Winner	Event/Show	Note(s)
September 24	Hechicero	CMLL 88. Aniversario	

CMLL World Light Heavyweight Championship
Incoming champion – Niebla Roja
No title changes

CMLL World Middleweight Championship
Incoming champion – El Cuatrero
Date	Winner	Event/Show	Note(s)
August 11	Vacated	—	Title vacated when Cuatrero left CMLL
December 10	Soberano, Jr.	CMLL Super Viernes	Defeated Templato in a tournament final for the vacant title

CMLL World Welterweight Championship
Incoming champion – Titán
No title changes

CMLL World Lightweight Championship
Incoming champion – Vacated
No title changes

CMLL World Micro-Estrellas Championship
Incoming champion – Chamuel
No title changes

CMLL World Mini-Estrella Championship
Incoming champion – Shockercito
No title changes

CMLL World Tag Team Championship
Incoming champions – Alianza de Plata y Oro (Carístico and Místico)
Date	Winner	Event/Show	Note(s)
September 24	Titán and Volador Jr.	Aniversario 88	

CMLL World Trios Championship
Incoming champions – Los Guerreros Lagunero (Euforia, Gran Guerrero, and Último Guerrero)
Date	Winner	Event/Show	Note(s)
March 26	Nueva Generación Dinamita (El Cuatrero, Forastero and Sansón)	CMLL La Vopa Jr. VIP	The exact length of this reign is uncertain. The titles were vacated somewhere at the beginning of April under unknown circumstances.
N/A	Vacated	—	
April 24	Los Cancerberos del Infierno (Virus, Raziel and Cancerbero)	65th Aniversario de Arena México	Defeated Stuka Jr., Guerrero Maya Jr. and Star Jr. to win the vacant titles.

CMLL World Women's Championship
Incoming champion – Princesa Sugehit
No title changes

CMLL Arena Coliseo Tag Team Championship
Incoming champions – Vacant
No title changes

NWA World Historic Light Heavyweight Championship
Incoming champion – Stuka Jr.
No title changes

NWA World Historic Middleweight Championship
Incoming champion – Carístico
No title changes

NWA World Historic Welterweight Championship
Incoming champion – Volador Jr.
No title changes

Mexican National Heavyweight Championship
Incoming champion – Diamante Azul
Date	Winner	Event/Show	Note(s)
August 11	Vacated	—	Diamante Azul left the Consejo Mundial de Lucha Libre in May. On August 11, a tournament to determine a new champion was confirmed.

Mexican National Light Heavyweight Championship
Incoming champion – Bárbaro Cavernario
Date	Winner	Event/Show	Note(s)
June 29	Felino	Live event	
October 12	Ángel de Oro	Live event	

Mexican National Welterweight Championship
Incoming champion – Soberano Jr.
No title changes

Mexican National Lightweight Championship
Incoming champion – Eléctrico
Date	Winner	Event/Show	Note(s)
December 11	Panterita del Ring Jr.	Sábado de Lucha	

Mexican National Tag Team Championship
Incoming champions – Atlantis Jr. and Flyer
Date	Winner	Event/Show	Note(s)
July 9	Atrapasuenos (Espiritu Negro and Rey Cometa)	CMLL	
October 4	Felino Jr. and Polvora	CMLL	

Mexican National Trios Championship
Incoming champions – Nueva Generación Dinamita (El Cuatrero, Forastero, and Sansón)
No title changes

Mexican National Women's Championship
Incoming champion – Reyna Isis
Date	Winner	Event/Show	Note(s)
November 16	Dark Silueta	CMLL Live event	

Mexican National Women's Tag Team Championship
Incoming champions – La Jarochita and Lluvia
No title changes

=== DDT ===
KO-D Openweight Championship
Incoming champion – Tetsuya Endo
Date	Winner	Event/Show	Note(s)
February 14	Jun Akiyama	Judgement 2021: DDT 24th Anniversary	
August 21	Konosuke Takeshita	Wrestle Peter Pan 2021	

DDT Universal Championship
Incoming champion – Yuki Ueno
Date	Winner	Event/Show	Note(s)
August 21	Daisuke Sasaki	Wrestle Peter Pan 2021	

DDT Extreme Division Championship
Incoming champion – Sanshiro Takagi
Date	Winner	Event/Show	Note(s)
February 7	Shunma Katsumata	Kumamoto Castle Natural Onsen Shironoyu Presents Steam Natural Onsen Pro-Wrestling	Three-way Falls Count Anywhere 45-minute Iron Man match also involving Batten×Burabura.
March 14	Chris Brookes	Day Dream Believer	Barbed Wire Coffin Deathmatch.
July 15	Shinya Aoki	Summer Vacation Tour In Shinjuku	This was a Winner Takes All No Disqualification and No Submission match in which Aoki's Ironman Heavymetalweight Championship was also on the line.

KO-D Tag Team Championship
Incoming champion – Eruption (Kazusada Higuchi and Yukio Sakaguchi)
Date	Winner	Event/Show	Note(s)
April 11	Smile Pissari (Harashima and Yuji Okabayashi)	April Fool 2021	
June 26	The37Kamiina (Konosuke Takeshita and Shunma Katsumata)	Summer Vacation 2021 in Osaka	
October 12	Disaster Box (Harashima and Naomi Yoshimura)	Get Alive 2021	

KO-D 6-Man Tag Team Championship
Incoming champion – Wakate Tsūshin Sedai (Akito, Kazuki Hirata, and Shota)
Date	Winner	Event/Show	Note(s)
March 14	Damnation (Tetsuya Endo, Soma Takao, and Yuji Hino)	Day Dream Believer	
September 4	Vacated	Dramatic Survivor 2021	As a result of having lost the Dramatic Survivor tournament, Damnation were forced to disband. The title was immediately vacated.
November 3	Pheromones (Danshoku "Dandy" Dino, Yuki "Sexy" Iino and Yumehito "Fantastic" Imanari)	D-Oh Grand Prix 2021 II in Ota-ku	Defeated Sanshiro Takagi, Shinya Aoki and Yusuke Okada to win the vacant titles.

KO-D 8-Man Tag Team Championship/KO-D 10-Man Tag Team Championship
Incoming champion – Vacant
Date	Winner	Event/Show	Note(s)
February 14	Shinya Aoki, Super Sasadango Machine, Antonio Honda, and Kazuki Hirata	Kawasaki Strong	Defeated Sanshiro Takagi, Danshoku Dino, Toru Owashi, and Makoto Oishi in a No disqualification match to win the vacant title.
March 28	Team Thoroughbred (Sanshiro Takagi, Yukio Naya, Chikara, and Yakan Nabe)	Judgement 2021: DDT 24th Anniversary	
July 4	Team Olympian (Yoshiaki Yatsu, Akito, Hiroshi Yamato and Keigo Nakamura)	King of DDT 2021 Final!!	
November 3	Toru Owashi, Antonio Honda, Kazuki Hirata and Yoshihiko	D-Oh Grand Prix 2021 II in Ota-ku	On January 3, 2022, the title reverted to its original form. Owashi, Honda, Hirata and Yoshihiko continued to defend the title as a four-man team.

O-40 Championship
Incoming champion – Toru Owashi
No title changes

Ironman Heavymetalweight Championship
Incoming champion – The Young Bucks' autobiography Killing the Business
Date	Winner	Event/Show	Note(s)
February 28	Saki Akai's photo book "Lip Hip Shake"	Into The Fight	Six-way match also involving Saki Akai, Antonio Honda, Danshoku Dino, and Kazuki Hirata.
March 14	Keigo Nakamura	Day Dream Believer	
March 14	Saki Akai	Day Dream Believer	Pinned Keigo Nakamura in a six-person tag team match.
April 3	Kazuki Hirata	Peanuts Are A Good Source Of Protein	During a six-person tag team match, Hirata pinned his own partner Saki Akai to win the title.
April 3	Chiba-kun stuffed animal	Peanuts Are A Good Source Of Protein	Shortly after, Kazuki Hirata ran off backstage followed by referee Yukinori Matsui. A three-count was heard and DJ Nira walked out carrying a stuffed animal of Chiba-kun, the mascot of the Chiba city, which referee Matsui confirmed as the new champion.
April 3	Kazuki Hirata	Peanuts Are A Good Source Of Protein	Mao attacked the toy but before he could pin it, he was attacked by Hirata who then stole the pin to win the title back.
April 3	Antonio Honda	Peanuts Are A Good Source Of Protein	Pinned Kazuki Hirata to win the six-person tag team match and the title.
April 3	Saki Akai	Peanuts Are A Good Source Of Protein	After the match, pinned Antonio Honda to win the title.
April 25	Chris Brookes	Max Bump 2021 Tour in Nagano	During a tag team match, Brookes teamed with Toui Kojima to defeat Yukio Sakaguchi and Saki Akai which he pinned to win the title.
April 25	Saki Akai	Max Bump 2021 Tour in Nagano	After the match, pinned Chris Brookes to win the title back.
May 4	Chris Brookes	Max Bump 2021	This was also for Brookes' DDT Extreme Division Championship.
May 29	Antonio Honda	Audience Tour 2021 in Fukuoka	
May 29	Saki Akai	Audience Tour 2021 in Fukuoka	
May 30	Shinya Aoki	Audience Tour 2021 in Kumamoto	
June 20	Kazuki Hirata	King of DDT 2021 2nd Round	Took place during a 9-person rumble rules match also involving Yukio Sakaguchi, Antonio Honda, Chris Brookes, Mad Paulie, Makoto Oishi, Saki Akai and Toru Owashi.
June 20	Shinya Aoki	King of DDT 2021 2nd Round	
July 25	Masayuki Okano	Kushiro Charity Sports Festival	Retired football player.
July 25	Danshoku Dino	Kushiro Charity Sports Festival	
September 12	Shunma Katsumata	Tenjin Wars 2021	Took place during a tag team match where Katsumata teamed with Yuki Ueno to successfully defend the KO-D Tag Team Championship against Danshoku Dino and Yuki Iino.
September 22	Harashima	Who's Gonna Top? Tour in Sapporo	Took place during a six-man tag team match where Harashima teamed with Toru Owashi and Naomi Yoshimura and defeated Shunma Katsumata, Yuki Ueno and Konosuke Takeshita.
October 23	Akito	Dramatic Dream Tour 2021 in Fuji	Pinned Harashima during Antonio Honda's autograph signing session.
November 10	Hideki Okatani	D-Oh Grand Prix 2021 II in Shinjuku	Took place during a six-person tag team match. Okatani pinned his own partner Akito to win the title.
November 10	Kazuki Hirata	D-Oh Grand Prix 2021 II in Shinjuku	Took place during a six-person tag team match. Hirata pinned Hideki Okatani to win the match and the title.
November 10	Toru Owashi	D-Oh Grand Prix 2021 II in Shinjuku	
November 21	Akito	D-Oh Grand Prix 2021 II in Korakuen Hall	
December 5	Kazuki Hirata	D-Oh Grand Prix 2021 II the Final	
December 5	Toru Owashi	D-Oh Grand Prix 2021 II the Final	
December 31	Yuna Mizumori	ChocoPro #187	Defeated Toru Owashi in a janken game. This was a Gatoh Move Pro Wrestling event.
December 31	Toru Owashi	ChocoPro #187	

=== Ice Ribbon ===
ICE×∞ Championship
Incoming champion – Suzu Suzuki
Date	Winner	Event/Show	Note(s)
January 23	Tsukasa Fujimoto	New Ice Ribbon #1095	
November 13	Tsukushi Haruka	New Ice Ribbon #1157	

FantastICE Championship
Incoming champion – Risa Sera
Date	Winner	Event/Show	Note(s)
June 27	Rina Yamashita	New Ice Ribbon #1129	This was a Fluorescent Light Tube Death Match.
December 31	Akane Fujita	New Ice Ribbon #1168 ~ Ribbonmania 2021	This was a falls count anywhere match.

Triangle Ribbon Championship
Incoming champion – Ram Kaicho
Date	Winner	Event/Show	Note(s)
March 27	Matsuya Uno	New Ice Ribbon #1106	This was a three-way match, also involving Ibuki Hoshi.
May 3	Thekla	New Ice Ribbon #1114	This was a three-way match, also involving Ibuki Hoshi.
August 9	Satsuki Totoro	New Ice Ribbon #1139 ~ Ice Ribbon 15th Anniversary	This was a three-way match, also involving Ram Kaicho.
October 17	Rina Shingaki	New Ice Ribbon #1152	This was a three-way match, also involving Miku Aono.
November 13	Maika Ozaki	New Ice Ribbon #1157	This was a three-way match, also involving Satsuki Totoro.

International Ribbon Tag Team Championship
Incoming champion – Rebel X Enemy (Maika Ozaki and Maya Yukihi)
Date	Winner	Event/Show	Note(s)
April 24	Hiragi Kurumi and Hiroyo Matsumoto	New Ice Ribbon #1112	
June 14	Vacated	—	
July 24	Hiroyo Matsumoto and Tsukasa Fujimoto	New Ice Ribbon #1135 ~ Summer Jumbo Ribbon 2021	Fujimoto and Matsumoto defeated Akane Fujita and Risa Sera, and Rebel X Enemy (Maika Ozaki and Maya Yukihi) in a three-way tag team match to win the vacant titles.
August 9	Azure Revolution (Maya Yukihi and Risa Sera)	New Ice Ribbon #1139 ~ Ice Ribbon 15th Anniversary	Between December 1 and 31, Yukihi and Sera held the titles under the stable banner of Prominence in which Yukihi has only acted as an associate.
December 31	Parent&Child (Hamuko Hoshi and Ibuki Hoshi)	New Ice Ribbon #1168 ~ Ribbonmania 2021	

=== Impact ===
Impact World Championship
Incoming champion – Rich Swann
Date	Winner	Event/Show	Note(s)
The title was briefly referred to as the Impact Unified World Championship after Rich Swann defeated TNA World Heavyweight Champion Moose at Sacrifice on March 13 to unify the Impact World Championship and TNA World Heavyweight Championship.
April 25	Kenny Omega	Rebellion	Winner Takes All match in which Omega also defended the AEW World Championship.
August 13	Christian Cage	AEW Rampage	First-time ever that the championship was defended on All Elite Wrestling (AEW) programming.
October 23	Josh Alexander	Bound for Glory	
October 23	Moose	Bound for Glory	Cashed in his Call Your Shot opportunity which he won earlier that same night.

Impact X Division Championship
Incoming champion – Manik
Date	Winner	Event/Show	Note(s)
March 13	Ace Austin	Sacrifice	
April 25	Josh Alexander	Rebellion	Three-way match also involving TJP.
September 23	Vacated	Impact!	Josh Alexander vacated the title to invoke Option C.
October 23	Trey Miguel	Bound for Glory	Defeated El Phantasmo and Steve Maclin in a three-way match to win the vacant title.

Impact Knockouts Championship
Incoming champion – Deonna Purrazzo
Date	Winner	Event/Show	Note(s)
October 23	Mickie James	Bound for Glory	

Impact World Tag Team Championship
Incoming champions – The Good Brothers (Doc Gallows and Karl Anderson)
Date	Winner	Event/Show	Note(s)
March 13	FinJuice (David Finlay and Juice Robinson)	Sacrifice	
May 17	Violent By Design (Eric Young, Deaner, Joe Doering, and Rhino)	Impact!	This was Rhino's Call Your Shot match. Rhino and Doering represented Violent By Design
July 17	The Good Brothers (Doc Gallows and Karl Anderson)	Slammiversary	This was a fatal four-way tag team match, also involving Rich Swann & Willie Mack and Fallah Bahh & No Way. Doering and Rhino represented Violent By Design. Gallows pinned Rhino to win the match and the titles.

Impact Knockouts Tag Team Championship
(Title reactivated)
Date	Winner	Event/Show	Note(s)
January 16	Fire N Flava (Kiera Hogan and Tasha Steelz)	Hard To Kill	Defeated Havok and Nevaeh in the tournament final to win the revived title; the title had been inactive since 2013.
April 25	Jordynne Grace and Rachael Ellering	Rebellion	
May 15	Fire N Flava (Kiera Hogan and Tasha Steelz)	Under Siege	
July 17	Decay (Jessicka Havok and Rosemary)	Slammiversary; Pre-Show	
October 23	The IInspiration (Cassie Lee and Jessica McKay)	Bound for Glory	

TNA World Heavyweight Championship
(Title sanctioned)
Date	Winner	Event/Show	Note(s)
February 23	Moose	Impact!	In April 2020 at Rebellion, Moose declared himself the TNA World Heavyweight Champion and began carrying around the belt that last represented the title before it became known as the Impact World Championship. Impact Wrestling did not officially recognize this until the following year on February 23 when they officially sanctioned the championship, recognizing Moose as champion.
March 13	Rich Swann	Sacrifice	Championship unification match in which Swann defended the Impact World Championship.
March 13	Unified	Sacrifice	Unified with the Impact World Championship, which became briefly known as the Impact Unified World Championship.

Impact Digital Media Championship
(Title created)
Date	Winner	Event/Show	Note(s)
October 23	Jordynne Grace	Bound for Glory; Pre-Show	Defeated Chelsea Green, Crazzy Steve, Fallah Bahh, John Skyler, and Madison Rayne in a six-way tournament final to win the title

=== IWRG ===
IWRG Intercontinental Heavyweight Championship
Incoming champion – Fresero Jr.
Date	Winner	Event/Show	Note(s)
September 5	Vacated	N/A	
September 5	Gianni Valletta	IWRG show	
September 16	El Hijo del Espectro Jr.	IWRG show	

IWRG Intercontinental Lightweight Championship
Incoming champion – Vacant
Date	Winner	Event/Show	Note(s)
July 12	Vacated	—	Vacated when Baby Extreme left the promotion.
July 15	Puma de Oro	IWRG Thursday Night Wrestling	Defeated Aster Boy, Baby Star Jr., Lunatic Xtreme, Mr. Puma, Noicy Boy, Redimido and Sobredosis in an eight-way elimination match for the vacant title.
October 30	Aster Boy	IWRG Castillo Del Terror 2021	

IWRG Intercontinental Middleweight Championship
Incoming champion – Dragon Bane
No title changes

IWRG Intercontinental Tag Team Championship
Incoming champions – Bryce Benjamin and Marshe Rockett
No title changes

IWRG Intercontinental Trios Championship
Incoming champions – Centella de Oro, Multifacético, and Prayer
No title changes

IWRG Intercontinental Welterweight Championship
Incoming champion – Cerebro Negro
Date	Winner	Event/Show	Note(s)
November 21	Jessy Ventura	—	

IWRG Junior de Juniors Championship
Incoming champion – Fresero Jr.
Date	Winner	Event/Show	Note(s)
May 6	El Hijo del Espectro Jr.	IWRG show	

IWRG Rey del Aire Championship
Incoming champion – Dragón Bane
No title changes.

IWRG Rey del Ring Championship
Incoming champion – Demonio Infernal
Date	Winner	Event/Show	Note(s)
March 21	Eterno	Guerreros de Acero	This was a Lucha de Apuestas Hair and Mask vs Titles tag team match between Eterno (hair) and El Hijo del Espectro Jr. (mask) against Fresero Jr. (Intercontinental Heavyweight) and Demonio Infernal (Rey del Ring). Eterno pinned Demonio Infernal to win the title.
May 9	Vacated	Rey del Ring	
May 9	El Hijo de Canis Lupus	Rey del Ring	Defeated DMT Azul by DQ to win the vacant title. DMT Azul performed a piledriver (which is a banned move in Mexico), being DQ'd, so Hijo de Canis Lupus won the title.

Distrito Federal Trios Championship
Incoming champions – El Infierno Eterno (Demonio Infernal, Eterno, and Lunatic Xtreme)
No title changes.

=== AAA ===
AAA Mega Championship
Incoming champion – Kenny Omega
Date	Winner	Event/Show	Note(s)
November 22	Vacated	—	Omega vacated the title due to injury.
December 4	El Hijo del Vikingo	Triplemanía Regia II	Defeated Bandido, Bobby Fish, Jay Lethal, and Samuray del Sol to win the vacant championship.

AAA World Cruiserweight Championship
Incoming champion – Laredo Kid
No title changes

AAA World Mini-Estrella Championship
Incoming champion – Dinastía
No title changes

AAA Latin American Championship
Incoming champion – Daga
Date	Winner	Event/Show	Note(s)
April 24	Vacated	—	Daga vacated the title.
May 1	Taurus	Rey de Reyes	Defeated Octagón Jr. and Villano III Jr. to win the vacant championship.

AAA Reina de Reinas Championship
Incoming champion – Taya Valkyrie
Date	Winner	Event/Show	Note(s)
February 24	Vacated	—	Taya Valkyrie vacated the championship due to signing with WWE.
May 1	Faby Apache	Rey de Reyes	Defeated Lady Shani, Lady Flammer, Chik Tormenta, Lady Maravilla, and Sexy Star II to win the vacant championship.
August 14	Deonna Purrazzo	Triplemanía XXIX	This was a Champion vs. Champion match where Purrazzo's Impact Knockouts Championship was also on the line.

AAA World Tag Team Championship
Incoming champions – Lucha Brothers (Fenix and Pentagón Jr.)
Date	Winner	Event/Show	Note(s)
October 16	FTR (Cash Wheeler and Dax Harwood)	AEW Dynamite	First time the championship changed hands on an All Elite Wrestling (AEW) program.

AAA World Mixed Tag Team Championship
Incoming champions – Lady Maravilla and Villano III Jr.
Date	Winner	Event/Show	Note(s)
October 21	Los Vipers (Arez and Chik Tormenta)	AAA TV-Taping	

AAA World Trios Championship
Incoming champions – Jinetes del Aire (El Hijo del Vikingo, Octagón Jr., and Myzteziz Jr.)
Date	Winner	Event/Show	Note(s)
May 8	Los Mercenarios (La Hiedra, Rey Escorpión, Taurus, and Texano Jr.)	Luchando por la Identidad de Mexico	

=== MLW ===
MLW World Heavyweight Championship
Incoming champion – Jacob Fatu
Date	Winner	Event/Show	Note(s)
October 2	Alexander Hammerstone	Fightland	Title vs. Title No Disqualification match also for Hammerstone's MLW National Openweight Championship

MLW World Tag Team Championship
Incoming champions – The Von Erichs (Marshall and Ross Von Erich)
Date	Winner	Event/Show	Note(s)
January 13	Los Parks (El Hijo de L.A. Park, L.A. Park, and L.A. Park Jr.)	Fusion	Texas Tornado match; Tom Lawlor served as special guest referee. L.A. Park and El Hijo de L.A. Park represented Los Parks
November 6	5150 (Danny Rivera and Slice Boogie)	War Chamber	Philadelphia street fight. El Hijo de L.A. Park and L.A. Park Jr. represented Los Parks

MLW World Middleweight Championship
Incoming champion – Myron Reed
Date	Winner	Event/Show	Note(s)
January 6	Lio Rush	Kings of Colosseum	
May 5	Myron Reed	MLW Fusion	
October 2	Yoshihiro Tajiri	Fightland	Pinned Reed in a four-way match also involving Aramis and Arez

MLW National Openweight Championship
Incoming champion – Alexander Hammerstone
Date	Winner	Event/Show	Note(s)
October 13	Vacated	Fusion: ALPHA	Hammerstone vacated the title after winning the MLW World Heavyweight Championship
November 6	Alex Kane	War Chamber	Defeated A. C. H., Alex Shelley, Myron Reed, and Zenshi in a ladder match to win the vacant title

MLW Caribbean Heavyweight Championship
Incoming champion – Savio Vega and Richard Holliday
Date	Winner	Event/Show	Note(s)
The title was initially a property of IWA Puerto Rico. Vega first appeared with the title on the June 15, 2019 episode of MLW Fusion, but after Holliday defeated Vega in a match, Holliday stole the championship and defended it as if he was champion. Holliday would soon defeat Vega in a Caribbean Strap match on the January 27, 2021 Fusion to become the undisputed champion.
July 10	King Muertes	Battle Riot III	Caribbean Rules match.

=== NJPW ===
IWGP Heavyweight Championship
Incoming champion – Tetsuya Naito
Date	Winner	Event/Show	Note(s)
January 4	Kota Ibushi	Wrestle Kingdom 15 in Tokyo Dome; Night 1	
March 4	Unified	—	The championship was unified with the IWGP Intercontinental Championship to create the IWGP World Heavyweight Championship. An official title unification match was held between defending champion Kota Ibushi and El Desperado at NJPW's 49th Anniversary Show on March 4.

IWGP Intercontinental Championship
Incoming champion – Tetsuya Naito
Date	Winner	Event/Show	Note(s)
January 4	Kota Ibushi	Wrestle Kingdom 15 in Tokyo Dome; Night 1	
March 4	Unified	—	The championship was unified with the IWGP Heavyweight Championship to create the IWGP World Heavyweight Championship. An official title unification match was held between defending champion Kota Ibushi and El Desperado at NJPW's 49th Anniversary Show on March 4.

IWGP World Heavyweight Championship
(Title created)
Date	Winner	Event/Show	Note(s)
March 4	Kota Ibushi	49th Anniversary Show	Defeated El Desperado in a title unification match to officially unify the IWGP Heavyweight Championship and IWGP Intercontinental Championship and be recognized as the inaugural IWGP World Heavyweight Champion. Ibushi held both former titles going into the match.
April 4	Will Ospreay	Sakura Genesis	
May 20	Vacated	—	Will Ospreay vacated the championship due to suffering a legitimate neck injury.
June 7	Shingo Takagi	Dominion 6.6 in Osaka-jo Hall	Defeated Kazuchika Okada to win the vacant title.

IWGP United States Championship
Incoming champion – Jon Moxley
Date	Winner	Event/Show	Note(s)
July 21	Lance Archer	AEW Fyter Fest; Night 2	First time the title changed hands on an All Elite Wrestling (AEW) program.
August 14	Hiroshi Tanahashi	Resurgence	
November 6	Kenta	Power Struggle	

IWGP Tag Team Championship
Incoming champions – Dangerous Tekkers (Taichi and Zack Sabre Jr.)
Date	Winner	Event/Show	Note(s)
January 4	Guerrillas of Destiny (Tama Tonga and Tanga Loa)	Wrestle Kingdom 15 in Tokyo Dome; Night 1	
June 1	Dangerous Tekkers (Taichi and Zack Sabre Jr.)	Road to Dominion	
July 11	Los Ingobernables de Japón (Tetsuya Naito and Sanada)	Summer Struggle in Sapporo; Night 2	
July 25	Dangerous Tekkers (Taichi and Zack Sabre Jr.)	Wrestle Grand Slam in Tokyo Dome	

IWGP Junior Heavyweight Championship
Incoming champion – Taiji Ishimori
Date	Winner	Event/Show	Note(s)
January 5	Hiromu Takahashi	Wrestle Kingdom 15 in Tokyo Dome; Night 2	
February 25	Vacated	Road to Castle Attack	The championship was vacated after Takahashi suffered a pect injury.
February 28	El Desperado	Castle Attack; Night 2	Defeated Bushi and El Phantasmo in a three-way match to win the vacant title.
July 25	Robbie Eagles	Wrestle Grand Slam in Tokyo Dome	
November 6	El Desperado	Power Struggle	

IWGP Junior Heavyweight Tag Team Championship
Incoming champions – Suzuki-gun (El Desperado and Yoshinobu Kanemaru)
Date	Winner	Event/Show	Note(s)
January 23	Bullet Club (El Phantasmo and Taiji Ishimori)	Road to The New Beginning	
February 25	Suzuki-gun (El Desperado and Yoshinobu Kanemaru)	Road to Castle Attack	
April 4	Roppongi 3K (Sho and Yoh)	Sakura Genesis	
June 23	Bullet Club (El Phantasmo and Taiji Ishimori)	Kizuna Road	
October 26	Flying Tiger (Robbie Eagles and Tiger Mask)	Road to Power Struggle; Night 3	

NEVER Openweight Championship
Incoming champion – Shingo Takagi
Date	Winner	Event/Show	Note(s)
January 30	Hiroshi Tanahashi	The New Beginning in Nagoya	
May 3	Jay White	Wrestling Dontaku; Night 1	
November 13	Tomohiro Ishii	Battle in the Valley	Last Chance match

NEVER Openweight 6-Man Tag Team Championship
Incoming champions – Chaos (Hirooki Goto, Tomohiro Ishii, and YOSHI-HASHI)
Date	Winner	Event/Show	Note(s)
November 6	House of Torture (Evil, Sho, and Yujiro Takahashi)	Power Struggle	

KOPW
Incoming Champion – Toru Yano
No title changes

Strong Openweight Championship
(Title created)
Date	Winner	Event/Show	Note(s)
April 23	Tom Lawlor	Strong	Defeated Brody King in the New Japan Cup USA finals to become the inaugural champion.

=== NWA ===
NWA Worlds Heavyweight Championship
Incoming champion – Nick Aldis
Date	Winner	Event/Show	Note(s)
August 29	Trevor Murdoch	73rd Anniversary Show	Title vs. Career match. This was Murdoch's Champion Series title match.

NWA World Women's Championship
Incoming champion – Serena Deeb
Date	Winner	Event/Show	Note(s)
June 6	Kamille	When Our Shadows Fall	

NWA World Television Championship
Incoming champion – Elijah Burke
Date	Winner	Event/Show	Note(s)
August 6	Tyrus	ExtraPowerrr	No Time Limit

NWA World Tag Team Championship
Incoming champions – Aron Stevens and JR Kratos
Date	Winner	Event/Show	Note(s)
August 29	La Rebelión (Bestia 666 and Mecha Wolf 450)	73rd Anniversary Show	

NWA National Championship
Incoming champion – Trevor Murdoch
Date	Winner	Event/Show	Note(s)
March 30	Chris Adonis	Power	No disqualification match
May 25	Vacated	—	Adonis vacated the championship to compete in an NWA Worlds Heavyweight Championship #1 contender's battle royal
July 5	Chris Adonis	Power	Defeated JTG to win the vacant title.

NWA World Women's Tag Team Championship
(Title reactivated)
Date	Winner	Event/Show	Note(s)
August 28	The Hex (Allysin Kay and Marti Belle)	EmPowerrr	Defeated Red Velvet and KiLynn King in a tournament final to win the revived championship.

=== Noah ===
GHC Heavyweight Championship
Incoming champion – Go Shiozaki
Date	Winner	Event/Show	Note(s)
February 12, 2021	Keiji Muto	Destination 2021	
June 6	CyberFight Festival 2021	Naomichi Marufuji	
October 10	Katsuhiko Nakajima	Grand Square 2021 in Osaka	

GHC Junior Heavyweight Championship
Incoming champion – Daisuke Harada
Date	Winner	Event/Show	Note(s)
February 12, 2021	Seiki Yoshioka	Destination 2021	
March 14	Atsushi Kotoge	Great Voyage 2021 in Fukuoka	
June 27	Hayata	Muta The World	

GHC National Championship
Incoming champion – Kenoh
Date	Winner	Event/Show	Note(s)
March 21	Kazuyuki Fujita	The Infinity 2021	
April 29	Takashi Sugiura	The Glory 2021	
October 28	Masaaki Mochizuki	Go On The Demolition Stage 2021	

GHC Tag Team Championship
Incoming champions – Sugiura-gun (Kazushi Sakuraba and Takashi Sugiura)
Date	Winner	Event/Show	Note(s)
March 7	The Aggression (Katsuhiko Nakajima and Masa Kitamiya)	Great Voyage 2021 In Yokohama	Kitamiya and Nakajima won the titles on this occasion as part of the Kongo stable. Kitamiya turned on Nakajima following their lone title defense from Mitsuharu Misawa Memorial from May 31, 2021. Despite that, they remained champions until a decision match was held.
July 22	Kaito Kiyomiya and Masa Kitamiya	NOAH Up To Emotion 2021	Katsuhiko Nakajima teamed with Manabu Soya to defend against Kitamiya and Kiyomiya to determine new champions.
November 13	M's Alliance (Keiji Muto and Naomichi Marufuji)	Demolition Stage 2021 In Yokohama	

GHC Junior Heavyweight Tag Team Championship
Incoming champions – Stinger (Hayata and Yoshinari Ogawa)
Date	Winner	Event/Show	Note(s)
May 31	Daisuke Harada and Hajime Ohara	Mitsuharu Misawa Memorial 2021 In Korakuen Hall: Forever In Our Hearts	
August 1	Scramble Time (Seiki Yoshioka and Yuya Susumu)	Cross Over in Hiroshima 2021	
September 12	Atsushi Kotoge and Hajime Ohara	N-1 Victory (Night 1)	
October 10	Los Perros del Mal de Japón (Eita and Nosawa Rongai)	Grand Square 2021 in Osaka	
November 28	Stinger (Hayata and Yoshinari Ogawa)	The Best 2021	

=== ROH ===
ROH World Championship
Incoming champion – Rush
Date	Winner	Event/Show	Note(s)
July 11	Bandido	Best in the World	
December 11	Vacated	Final Battle	The title was vacated after Bandido contracted COVID-19
December 11	Jonathan Gresham	Final Battle	Defeated Jay Lethal to win the vacant title, represented by the original design

ROH World Television Championship
Incoming champion – Dragon Lee
Date	Winner	Event/Show	Note(s)
March 26	Tracy Williams	ROH 19th Anniversary Show	Defeated Kenny King, who subbed in for an injured Lee.
N/A (aired May 1)	Tony Deppen	Ring of Honor Wrestling	The actual date the match took place is currently unknown.
July 11	Dragon Lee	Best in the World	
N/A (aired November 20)	Dalton Castle	Ring of Honor Wrestling	The actual date the match took place is currently unknown.
December 11	Rhett Titus	Final Battle	Four Corner Survival match, also featuring Joe Hendry and Silas Young. Titus pinned Young

ROH Pure Championship
Incoming champion – Jonathan Gresham
Date	Winner	Event/Show	Note(s)
September 12	Josh Woods	Death Before Dishonor	

ROH Women's World Championship
(Title introduced)
Date	Winner	Event/Show	Note(s)
September 12	Rok-C	Death Before Dishonor	Defeated Miranda Alize in a tournament final to win the inaugural championship.

ROH World Tag Team Championship
Incoming champions – The Foundation (Jay Lethal and Jonathan Gresham)
Date	Winner	Event/Show	Note(s)
N/A (aired February 27)	La Faccion Ingobernable (Dragon Lee and Kenny King)	Ring of Honor Wrestling	Pure Rules tag team match. The actual date the match took place is currently unknown.
March 26	The Foundation (Rhett Titus and Tracy Williams)	ROH 19th Anniversary Show	Defeated King and La Bestia del Ring, who was subbing for an injured Lee.
July 11	Violence Unlimited (Chris Dickinson and Homicide)	Best in the World	Fight Without Honor match; defeated Titus and Jonathan Gresham, who was subbing for an injured Williams.
N/A (aired September 11)	La Faccion Ingobernable (Dragon Lee and Kenny King)	Ring of Honor Wrestling	The actual date the match took place is currently unknown.
November 14	The OGK (Matt Taven and Mike Bennett)	Honor for All	
December 11	The Briscoe Brothers (Mark Briscoe and Jay Briscoe)	Final Battle	

ROH World Six-Man Tag Team Championship
Incoming champions – MexiSquad (Bandido, Flamita, and Rey Horus)
Date	Winner	Event/Show	Note(s)
N/A (aired February 20)	Shane Taylor Promotions (Shane Taylor, Moses, and Kaun)	Ring of Honor Wrestling	The actual date the match took place is currently unknown. O'Shay Edwards would occasionally defend the titles under the Freebird Rule.
December 11	The Righteous (Bateman, Dutch, and Vincent)	Final Battle; Pre-Show	Defeated Kaun, Moses, and O'Shay Edwards, who took Taylor's place, as Taylor would have a match the same night

=== The Crash ===
The Crash Heavyweight Championship
Incoming champion – Bandido
Date	Winner	Event/Show	Note(s)
November 5	El Hijo del Vikingo	The Crash 10th Anniversary Show	This was a four-way match that also included Dragon Lee and Willie Mack.

The Crash Cruiserweight Championship
Incoming champion – Oraculo
Date	Winner	Event/Show	Note(s)
November 5	Dinámico	The Crash 10th Anniversary Show	This was a three-way match that also included Black Danger.

The Crash Junior Championship
Incoming champion – Dinamico
No title changes.

The Crash Tag Team Championship
Incoming champions – Los Traumas (Trauma I and Trauma II)
Date	Winner	Event/Show	Note(s)
November 5	La Rebelión Amarilla (Bestia 666 and Mecha Wolf)	The Crash 10th Anniversary Show	This was a tag team four-way match that also included Los Mercenarios (Taurus & Rey Escorpión) and Funnybone & Super Beast

The Crash Women's Championship
Incoming champion – Lady Flamer
No title changes.

=== WWE ===
– Raw
– SmackDown
– NXT
– NXT UK
– Unbranded

==== Raw and SmackDown ====
Raw and SmackDown each have a world championship, a secondary championship, a women's championship, and a male tag team championship.

WWE Championship
Incoming champion – Drew McIntyre
Date	Winner	Event/Show	Note(s)
February 21	The Miz	Elimination Chamber	This was Miz's Money in the Bank contract cash-in match.
March 1	Bobby Lashley	Raw	This was a Lumberjack match.
September 13	Big E	Raw	This was Big E's Money in the Bank contract cash-in match.

WWE Universal Championship
Incoming champion – Roman Reigns
No title changes.

WWE United States Championship
Incoming champion – Bobby Lashley
Date	Winner	Event/Show	Note(s)
February 21	Riddle	Elimination Chamber	This was a triple threat match, also involving John Morrison, who Riddle pinned.
April 11	Sheamus	WrestleMania 37; Night 2	
August 21	Damian Priest	SummerSlam	

WWE Intercontinental Championship
Incoming champion – Big E
Date	Winner	Event/Show	Note(s)
April 11	Apollo Crews	WrestleMania 37; Night 2	This was a Nigerian Drum Fight.
August 13	King Nakamura	SmackDown	His ring name reverted to Shinsuke Nakamura on October 8 out of respect for the King of the Ring tournament.

WWE Raw Women's Championship
Incoming champion – Asuka
Date	Winner	Event/Show	Note(s)
April 11	Rhea Ripley	WrestleMania 37; Night 2	
July 18	Charlotte Flair	Money in the Bank	
July 19	Nikki A.S.H.	Raw	This was A.S.H.'s Money in the Bank contract cash-in match.
August 21	Charlotte Flair	SummerSlam	This was a triple threat match, also involving Rhea Ripley.
October 22	Becky Lynch	SmackDown	During the 2021 WWE Draft, Charlotte Flair was drafted by SmackDown, while Lynch, who held the SmackDown Women's Championship, was drafted by Raw. To keep the championships on their respective brands, Lynch and Flair exchanged titles.

WWE SmackDown Women's Championship
Incoming champion – Sasha Banks
Date	Winner	Event/Show	Note(s)
April 10	Bianca Belair	WrestleMania 37; Night 1	
August 21	Becky Lynch	SummerSlam	
October 22	Charlotte Flair	SmackDown	During the 2021 WWE Draft, Becky Lynch was drafted by Raw, while Flair, who held the Raw Women's Championship, was drafted by SmackDown. To keep the championships on their respective brands, Flair and Lynch exchanged titles.

WWE Raw Tag Team Championship
Incoming champions – The Hurt Business (Cedric Alexander and Shelton Benjamin)
Date	Winner	Event/Show	Note(s)
March 15	The New Day (Kofi Kingston and Xavier Woods)	Raw	
April 10	AJ Styles and Omos	WrestleMania 37; Night 1	
August 21	RK-Bro (Randy Orton and Riddle)	SummerSlam	

WWE SmackDown Tag Team Championship
Incoming champions – The Street Profits (Angelo Dawkins and Montez Ford)
Date	Winner	Event/Show	Note(s)
January 8	The Dirty Dawgs (Dolph Ziggler and Robert Roode)	SmackDown	
May 16	The Mysterios (Rey Mysterio and Dominik Mysterio)	WrestleMania Backlash	First-ever father and son team to win a tag team championship in WWE.
July 18	The Usos (Jey Uso and Jimmy Uso)	Money in the Bank; Kickoff	

==== NXT ====
NXT Championship
Incoming champion – Finn Bálor
Date	Winner	Event/Show	Note(s)
April 8	Karrion Kross	TakeOver: Stand & Deliver; Night 2	
August 22	Samoa Joe	TakeOver 36	
September 12	Vacated	—	Samoa Joe vacated the title due to an undisclosed injury.
September 14	Tommaso Ciampa	NXT 2.0	This was a fatal four-way match for the vacant title, also involving L. A. Knight, Pete Dunne, and Von Wagner.

NXT North American Championship
Incoming champion – Johnny Gargano
Date	Winner	Event/Show	Note(s)
May 18	Bronson Reed	NXT	This was a Steel Cage match.
June 29	Isaiah "Swerve" Scott	NXT	
October 12	Carmelo Hayes	NXT 2.0	This was Hayes' NXT Breakout Tournament contract cash-in match.

NXT Women's Championship
Incoming champion – Io Shirai
Date	Winner	Event/Show	Note(s)
April 7	Raquel González	TakeOver: Stand & Deliver; Night 1	
October 26	Mandy Rose	NXT 2.0: Halloween Havoc	This was a Chucky's choice Trick or Street Fight match (a Halloween-themed Street Fight).

NXT Tag Team Championship
Incoming champions – Danny Burch and Oney Lorcan
Date	Winner	Event/Show	Note(s)
March 23	Vacated	—	NXT General Manager William Regal vacated the championship after Danny Burch suffered a shoulder injury the week prior.
April 7	MSK (Wes Lee and Nash Carter)	TakeOver: Stand & Deliver; Night 1	This was a triple threat tag team match for the vacant title, also involving Grizzled Young Veterans (James Drake and Zack Gibson) and Legado Del Fantasma (Raul Mendoza and Joaquin Wilde).
October 26	Imperium (Fabian Aichner and Marcel Barthel)	NXT 2.0: Halloween Havoc	This was a Lumber Jack-o'-Lantern Tag Team match (a Halloween-themed lumberjack tag team match).

NXT Cruiserweight Championship
Incoming champions – Jordan Devlin and Santos Escobar (interim)
Due to a travel ban as a result of the COVID-19 pandemic in 2020, an interim champion was determined in the United States as Jordan Devlin, who resides in the United Kingdom, was unable to travel to the U.S. and defend the title until March 2021. Santos Escobar became the U.S.-based interim champion, while Devlin defended the title on NXT UK. Both Devlin and Escobar were recognized as champion until Escobar defeated Devlin in a ladder match to determine the undisputed champion at TakeOver: Stand & Deliver Night 2 on April 8.
Date	Winner	Event/Show	Note(s)
April 13	Kushida	NXT	
September 21	Roderick Strong	NXT 2.0	

NXT Women's Tag Team Championship
(Title created)
Date	Winner	Event/Show	Note(s)
March 10	Dakota Kai and Raquel González	NXT	After winning the inaugural Women's Dusty Rhodes Tag Team Classic, Kai and González received a match for the WWE Women's Tag Team Championship against champions Nia Jax and Shayna Baszler on the March 3 episode of NXT; following a controversial finish resulting in a win for Jax and Baszler, NXT General Manager William Regal introduced the NXT Women's Tag Team Championship the following week and awarded them to Kai and González on account of winning the Dusty Rhodes Tag Team Classic. The WWE Women's Tag Team Championship subsequently became exclusive to just the Raw and SmackDown brands afterwards.
March 10	Ember Moon and Shotzi Blackheart	NXT	
May 4	The Way (Candice LeRae and Indi Hartwell)	NXT	This was a Street Fight.
July 6	Io Shirai and Zoey Stark	NXT: The Great American Bash	
October 26	Toxic Attraction (Gigi Dolin and Jacy Jayne)	NXT 2.0: Halloween Havoc	This was a triple threat tag team Scareway to Hell Ladder match (a Halloween-themed ladder match), also involving the team of Indi Hartwell and Persia Pirotta.

Million Dollar Championship
(Title reactivated)
Date	Winner	Event/Show	Note(s)
June 13	L. A. Knight	TakeOver: In Your House	Ted DiBiase reintroduced the championship on the June 8, 2021 episode of NXT. It was previously unsanctioned but became recognized by WWE with its reintroduction on NXT. Knight defeated Cameron Grimes in a ladder match to win the revived title.
August 22	Cameron Grimes	TakeOver 36	Had Grimes lost, Ted DiBiase would have become L. A. Knight's butler.
August 23 (aired August 24)	Deactivated	NXT	Cameron Grimes gave the title back to Ted DiBiase, thus deactivating the title and being recognized as the final champion.

==== NXT UK ====
NXT United Kingdom Championship
Incoming champion – Walter
Date	Winner	Event/Show	Note(s)
August 22	Ilja Dragunov	NXT TakeOver 36	

NXT UK Heritage Cup
Incoming champion – A-Kid
Date	Winner	Event/Show	Note(s)
N/A (aired May 20)	Tyler Bate	NXT UK	The actual date the match took place is currently unknown.
October 6 (aired October 28)	Noam Dar	NXT UK	

NXT UK Women's Championship
Incoming champion – Kay Lee Ray
Date	Winner	Event/Show	Note(s)
N/A (aired June 10)	Meiko Satomura	NXT UK	The actual date the match took place is currently unknown.

NXT UK Tag Team Championship
Incoming champions – Gallus (Mark Coffey and Wolfgang)
Date	Winner	Event/Show	Note(s)
N/A (aired February 25)	Pretty Deadly (Lewis Howley and Sam Stoker)	NXT UK	The actual date the match took place is currently unknown.
N/A (aired December 9)	Moustache Mountain (Tyler Bate and Trent Seven)	NXT UK	The actual date the match took place is unknown.

==== Unbranded ====
These titles are not brand exclusive. The colors indicate the home brand of the champions (names without a color are former WWE wrestlers, Hall of Famers, or non-wrestlers).

WWE 24/7 Championship
Incoming champion – Angel Garza
Date	Winner	Event/Show	Note(s)
January 4	R-Truth	Raw; Legends Night	Pinned Angel Garza backstage after Garza had been scared by The Boogeyman.
January 31	Alicia Fox	Royal Rumble	During the women's Royal Rumble match, R-Truth ran out to the ring. Several other wrestlers attempted to attack Truth. During the distraction, Fox rolled up Truth in the ring to win the title.
January 31	R-Truth	Royal Rumble	After Alicia Fox was eliminated from the women's Royal Rumble match, Truth pinned her outside the ring with a rollup to win back the title.
January 31	Peter Rosenberg	Royal Rumble	Rosenberg, who had served as a panelist during the Royal Rumble Kickoff pre-show, rolled up R-Truth by the panelist table to win the title. Rosenberg is a radio personality who often serves as a panelist during the pre-shows of WWE pay-per-views. Eighth non-wrestler to win the title.
February 1	R-Truth	The Michael Kay Show	During the live remote broadcast, which aired on the YES Network and WEPN Radio, Truth pinned Peter Rosenberg in the latter's hotel room.
February 6	Doug Flutie	Celebrity Flag Football Game	At Clearwater Beach during halftime of the game, which aired on ESPNEWS, Flutie rolled up R-Truth to win the title. Flutie is a former National Football League, Canadian Football League, and United States Football League player. Ninth non-wrestler to win the title.
February 6	R-Truth	Celebrity Flag Football Game	Shortly after, Truth snuck up from behind and rolled up Doug Flutie to win back the title, which also aired on ESPNEWS.
February 15	Akira Tozawa	Raw	Following a scuffle, Tozawa pinned R-Truth backstage.
February 15	Bad Bunny	Raw	After witnessing Akira Tozawa win the title, Damian Priest attacked Tozawa and allowed guest star Bad Bunny to pin him and become champion. Bad Bunny is a rapper, singer, and songwriter. 10th non-wrestler to win the title.
March 15	R-Truth	Raw	Bad Bunny relinquished the title to R-Truth in exchange for Stone Cold Steve Austin memorabilia.
March 21	Joseph Average	Fastlane	Old Spice representative Joseph Average accidentally pinned R-Truth backstage during an Old Spice advertisement after a shelf full of deodorants fell over. Joseph Average was portrayed by NXT and WWE Performance Center trainee Rik Bugez.
March 21	R-Truth	Fastlane	Pinned Old Spice representative Joseph Average with a roll up to win back the title.
N/A (aired April 19)	Akira Tozawa	N/A	Pinned R-Truth in the backstage area of Tropicana Field. This title change was shown on WWE's YouTube channel. The actual date the title change took place is unknown. WWE's official title history currently does not recognize this reign.
N/A (aired April 19)	Joseph Average	N/A	Pinned Akira Tozawa in the backstage area of Tropicana Field. This title change was shown on WWE's YouTube channel. The actual date the title change took place is unknown. WWE's official title history currently does not recognize this reign.
N/A (aired April 19)	R-Truth	N/A	Pinned Joseph Average in the backstage area of Tropicana Field. This title change was shown on WWE's YouTube channel. The actual date the title change took place is unknown. WWE's official title history currently does not recognize this reign.
May 17	Akira Tozawa	Raw	Pinned R-Truth backstage in a stairwell.
June 29	Drew Gulak	Raw	Pinned Akira Tozawa at ringside during a battle royal.
June 29	R-Truth	Raw	Pinned Drew Gulak at ringside during a battle royal.
June 29	Akira Tozawa	Raw	Pinned R-Truth at ringside during a battle royal
July 19	Reginald	Raw	Pinned Akira Tozawa in the ring after Tozawa had been chased to the ring by other wrestlers. His ring name was changed to Reggie on July 23.
November 8	Drake Maverick	Raw	This was an official watch where Maverick pinned Reggie in-ring to win the title.
November 8	Akira Tozawa	Raw	
November 8	Corey Graves	Raw	
November 8	Byron Saxton	Raw	
November 8	Drake Maverick	Raw	
November 8	Reggie	Raw	
November 22	Cedric Alexander	Raw	This was an official match where Alexander pinned Reggie in-ring to win the title.
November 22	Dana Brooke	Raw	

WWE Women's Tag Team Championship
Incoming champions – Asuka and Charlotte Flair
Date	Winner	Event/Show	Note(s)
January 31	Nia Jax and Shayna Baszler	Royal Rumble; Kickoff	
The title became exclusive to the Raw and SmackDown brands following the establishment of the NXT Women's Tag Team Championship for the NXT brand on March 10.
May 14	Natalya and Tamina	SmackDown	
September 20	Nikki A.S.H and Rhea Ripley	Raw	
November 22	Queen Zelina and Carmella	Raw	

== Awards and honors ==
=== WWE ===
==== WWE Hall of Fame ====
Category	Inductee
Individual	Molly Holly
Individual	Eric Bischoff
Individual	Kane
Individual	The Great Khali
Individual	Rob Van Dam
Celebrity	Ozzy Osbourne
Warrior Award	Rich Hering
Legacy	Dick the Bruiser
Legacy	Pez Whatley
Legacy	Buzz Sawyer
Legacy	Ethel Johnson
Legacy	Paul Boesch

=== Impact ===
==== Impact Hall of Fame ====
Inductee
Awesome Kong

== Debuts ==
- February 14 – Yuto Nakashima (NJPW)
- March 11
  - Astroman
  - Junya Matsunaga
- April 1 – Arisu Endo
- April 2 – Logan Paul
- April 3 – Saran
- April 4 – Yuya Koroku
- April 17 – Kazumasa Yoshida
- April 30 – Minorita (Dragon Gate)
- May 3 – Aoi
- June 9 – Saito Brothers
- July 1 – Maya Fukuda (Gleat)
- August 21 – Ilusion
- August 24 – Brutus Creed, Julius Creed, Kosei Fujita and Ryohei Oiwa (NJPW)
- September 20 – Ishin Iihashi
- October 5 – Trick Williams (NXT)
- October 12 – Yuki Ishida (DDT)
- October 19 – Ru Feng (NXT)
- October 22 – Natsuki (Actwres girl'Z)
- November 2 – Erica Yan (NXT)
- November 3 – Kaho Matsushita
- November 6 – Ricky Sosa
- November 13 – Kiku (Ice Ribbon)
- November 20 – Chiaki
- December 8 – Hook
- December 11 – Rayne Leverkusen
- December 18 – Evan Golden

== Retirements ==
- January – Lars Sullivan (2015-2021)
- March – The Brian Kendrick
- April 20 – Kenny Dykstra (2001-2021)
- April 28 – Sadie Gibbs
- May 6 – Solo Darling (2011–2021)
- June 27 – Matsuya Uno
- July 31 - David Arquette (2000-July 31, 2021)
- August 1 – Masato Yoshino
- August 22 – Ryo Kawamura
- August 28 – Awesome Kong (1999-2021)
- November 5 – Sabu (1984-2021)
- November 23 – Rina Shingaki (2018–2021)

== Deaths ==
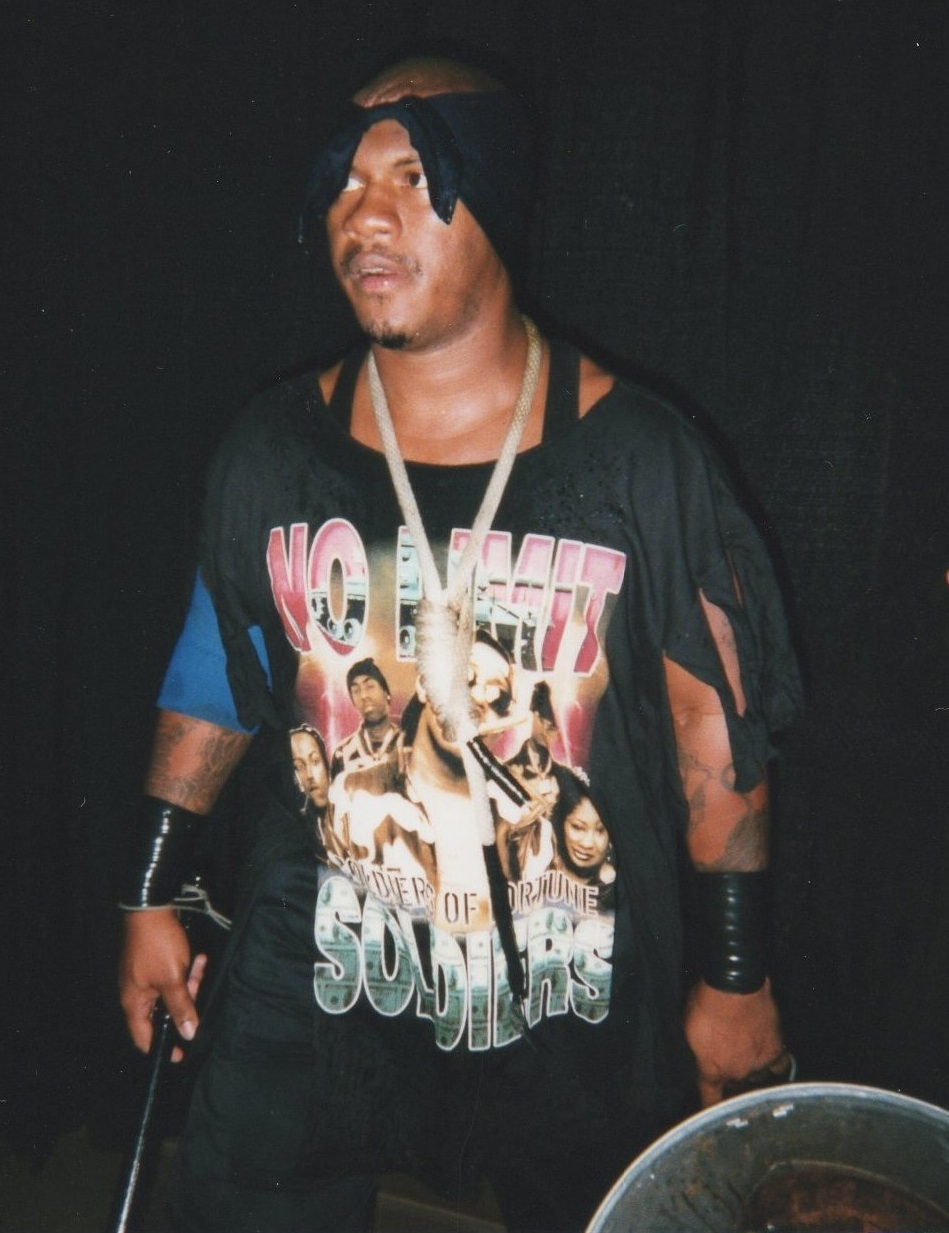
New Jack

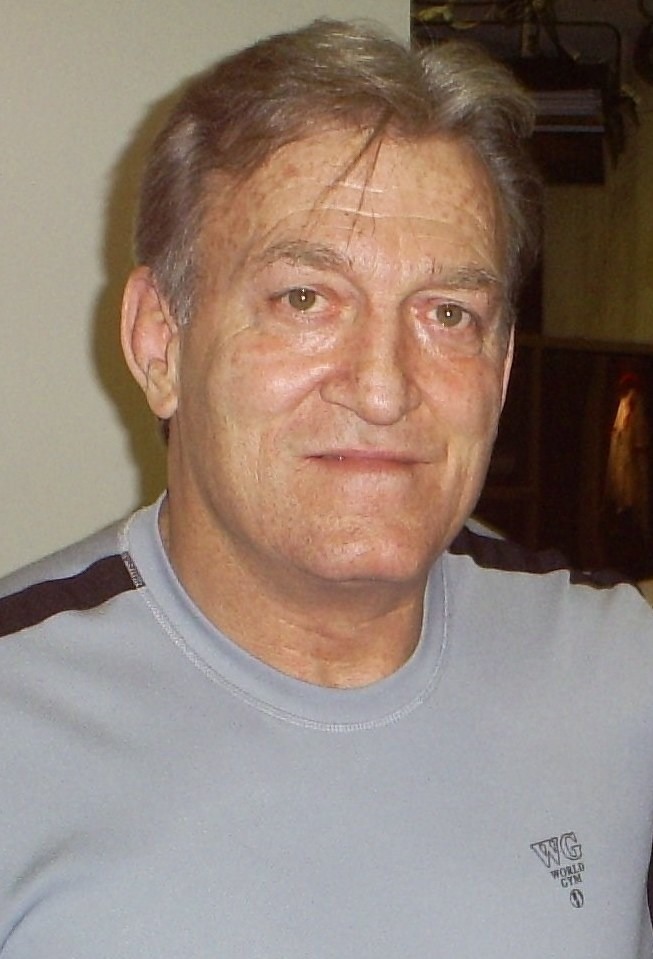
Paul Orndorff

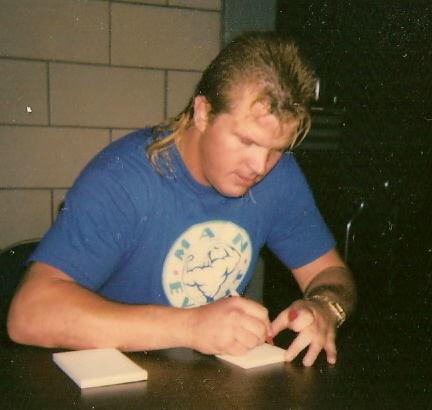
Bobby Eaton

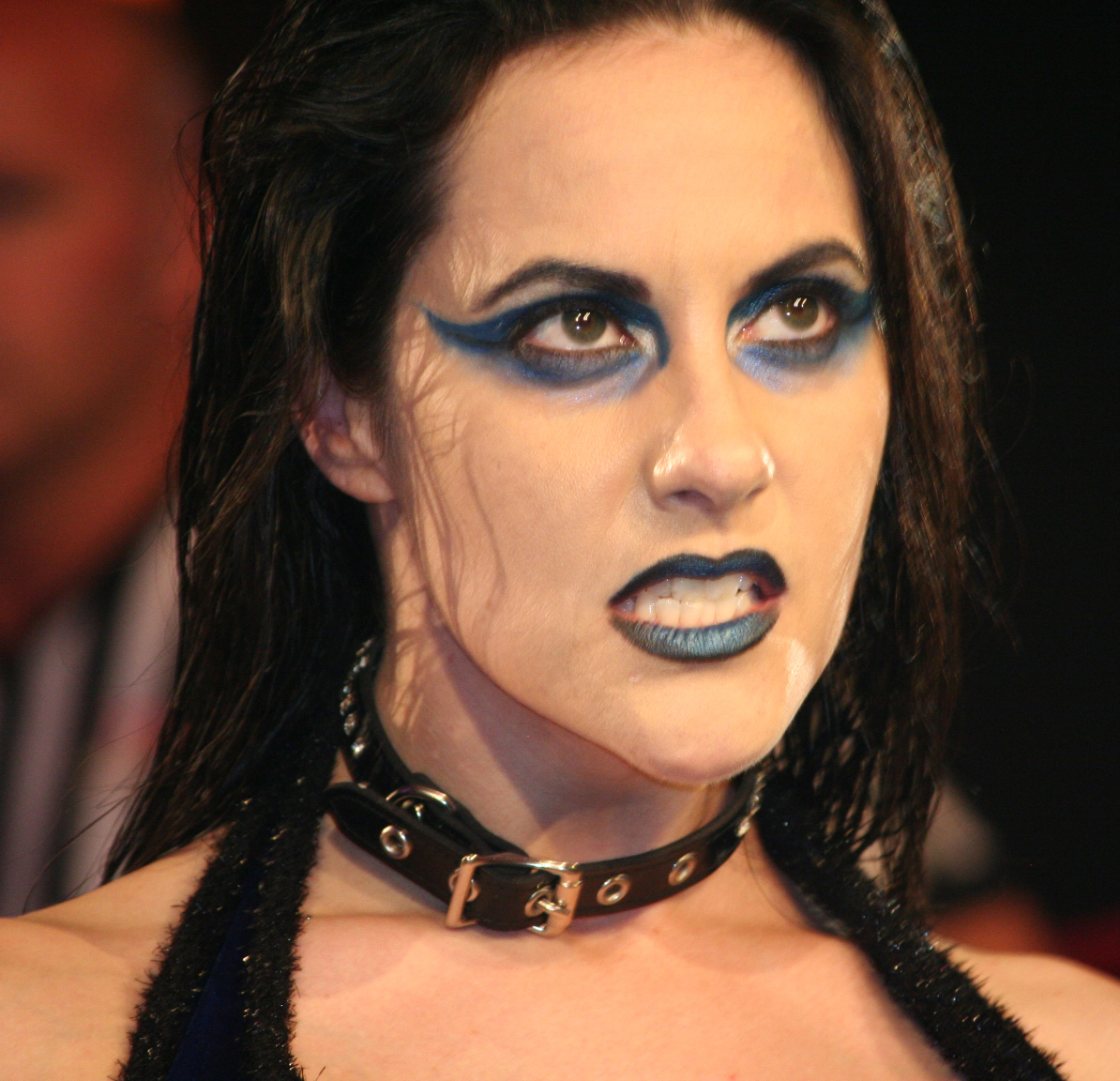
Daffney

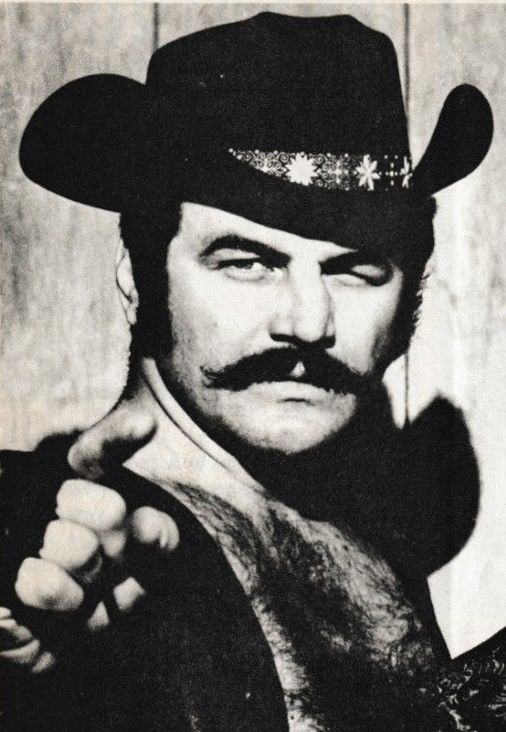
Blackjack Lanza

- January 7 - Bobby Davis (wrestler) (born 1937)
- January 10 - Danie Voges (born 1954)
- January 11 - David Khakhaleishvili (born 1971)
- January 16 – Paul Varelans (born 1969)
- February 1 – Dustin Diamond (born 1977)
- February 5 –
  - Butch Reed (born 1954)
  - Leon Spinks (born in 1953)
- February 11 – Rusty Brooks (born 1958)
- February 20 – Dean Ho (born 1940)
- February 23 – Art Michalik (born 1930)
- February 24 - Jocephus (born 1977)
- February 26 – Johnny De Fazio (born 1940)
- March 1 – Ann Casey (born 1938)
- March 3 – Jim Crockett Jr. (born 1944)
- March 5 – Buddy Colt (born 1936)
- March 19 – Barry Orton (born 1958)
- March 21 – Jimmy Abbott (born 1959)
- April 6 – Jack Veneno (born 1942)
- April 8 – John da Silva (born 1934)
- May 14 – New Jack (born 1963)
- May 17 – Don Kernodle (born 1950)
- May 23 - Deepak Singh (born 1942)
- May 24 – Paul Christy (born 1939)
- May 28 – Tony Marino (born 1931)
- June 2 – Pasión Kristal (born 1976)
- June 23 – Melissa Coates (born 1971)
- June 30 – The Patriot (born 1961)
- July 7 – Chris Youngblood (born 1966)
- July 12 – Paul Orndorff (born 1949)
- July 26 – Brazo de Plata (born 1963)
- July 28 – Ted Lewin (born 1935)
- August 2 – Hideki Hosaka (born 1971)
- August 3 – Jody Hamilton (born 1938)
- August 4
  - – Bobby Eaton (born 1958)
  - – Bert Prentice (born 1958)
- August 12 – Dominic DeNucci (born 1932)
- August 14 - Fez Whatley (born 1964)
- August 21 - Jarvis Astaire (born 1923)
- August 23 – Brick Bronsky (born 1964)
- September 1
  - Daffney (born 1975)
  - Yar (born 1971)
- September 2
  - – Steve Lawler (born 1965)
  - – Ryan Sakoda (born 1974)
- September 7 – Bill White (born 1945)
- September 21 – Rumi Kazama (born 1965)
- September 29 – Snowman (born 1945)
- October 7 – Reggie Parks (born 1934)
- October 17 – Hido (born 1969)
- November 6 – Angelo Mosca (born 1937)
- November 11 - Buzz Tyler (born 1948)
- November 14 - John Lees (born 1930)
- November 15 – Estrella Blanca (born 1938)
- November 28 – Pat Barrett (born 1936)
- December 1 – Kal Rudman (born 1930)
- December 8 – Blackjack Lanza (born 1935)
- December 13 – Jimmy Rave (born 1982)
- December 14 – Raul Reyes (born 1937)
- December 22 - Corporal Kirchner (born 1957)
- December 27 - Markus Crane (born 1988)
- December 31 - Strong Kobayashi (born 1940)

== See also ==
- List of WWE pay-per-view and WWE Network events, WWE Raw special episodes, WWE SmackDown special episodes, and WWE NXT special episodes
- List of AEW pay-per-view events, AEW Dynamite special episodes, and AEW Rampage special episodes
- List of Impact Wrestling pay-per-view events and Impact Plus Monthly Specials
- List of NJPW major events and NJPW Strong special episodes
- List of ROH pay-per-view events
- List of World Wonder Ring Stardom major events
- List of major Pro Wrestling Noah events
- List of major DDT Pro-Wrestling events
- List of MLW events
- List of NWA pay-per-view events
- WWE ThunderDome
