= Snowman (wrestler) =

American professional wrestler

Personal information
- Born: Eddie Crawford; November 17, 1945 Germantown, Tennessee
- Died: September 29, 2021 (aged 75)

Professional wrestling career
- Ring name(s): Snowman; Dr. Detriot; Jimmy Hart Jr.
- Billed weight: 264 lb (120 kg)
- Trained by: Jerry Lawler; Koko B. Ware
- Debut: 1982
- Retired: 1990

Eddie Crawford (November 17, 1945 – September 29, 2021) was an American professional wrestler. He was known by his ring name Snowman during his time in Mid-South Wrestling, Continental Wrestling Association and United States Wrestling Association.

== Wrestling career ==
He made his professional wrestling debut in 1982. On May 8, 1985 he defeated Jake Roberts for the Mid-South Television Championship in a tournament. He surrendered the title to Dutch Mantel on July 3, 1985. Snowman defeated his trainer Jerry Lawler for the USWA Heavyweight Championship on June 18, 1990. He then vacated the title two months later and retired from wrestling.

== Death ==
On September 29, 2021, Crawford died of a heart attack at 75.

== Accomplishments ==
- Mid-South Wrestling Association
  - Mid-South Television Championship (1 time)
- United States Wrestling Association
  - USWA Heavyweight Championship (1 time)
