= Dramatic Infinity =

DDT Pro Wrestling pay-per-view event series

- Promotions: CyberFight (2024–present)
- Brands: DDT Pro-Wrestling (2024–present)
- First event: Dramatic Infinity 2024

Dramatic Infinity is a recurring professional wrestling event promoted by CyberFight for the DDT Pro-Wrestling brand (DDT). The event is held in September and airs as an internet pay-per-view (iPPV) on CyberFight's streaming service Wrestle Universe.

== History ==
In 2024, Dramatic Infinity was produced by CyberFight's DDT Pro-Wrestling brand as a 3-hour special event in Korakuen Hall, effectively replacing Who's Gonna Top, which served as DDT's September event between 2003 and 2023.

== Events ==
Event	Date	City	Venue	Main event	Ref.
Dramatic Infinity 2024	September 29, 2024	Tokyo, Japan	Korakuen Hall	Schadenfreude International (Chris Brookes, Masahiro Takanashi and Takeshi Masada) vs. The37Kamiina (Yuki Ueno and Mao) and Kaisei Takechi	
Dramatic Infinity 2025	September 28, 2025	Tokyo, Japan	Korakuen Hall	Kazuki Hirata (c) vs. Yoshihiko for the KO-D Openweight Championship	
Dramatic Infinity 2026	September 21, 2026	Tokyo, Japan	Korakuen Hall	Mao (c) vs. Fuminori Abe for the KO-D Openweight Championship	
(c) – refers to the champion(s) heading into the match
