= Ultimate Party 2025 =

2025 DDT Pro-Wrestling event

- Promotional poster of the event
- Promotion: CyberFight
- Brand: DDT Pro-Wrestling
- Date: November 3, 2025
- City: Tokyo, Japan
- Venue: Ryōgoku Kokugikan

Pay-per-view chronology
← Previous; Dramatic Infinity 2025	Next → —

Ultimate Party chronology
← Previous; 2024	Next → —

Ultimate Party 2025 was a professional wrestling event produced by CyberFight's DDT Pro-Wrestling (DDT). The event took place on November 3, 2025, in Tokyo at the Ryōgoku Kokugikan. It was the fifth event under the Ultimate Party chronology. The event aired live on DDT's streaming service Wrestle Universe.

== Production ==
=== Background ===
Ultimate Party is a professional wrestling event that was established by DDT Pro-Wrestling in 2019. The event was held a second time in 2020, but was discontinued. In May 2023, DDT announced the revival of the event, with the third Ultimate Party to take place on November 12, 2023, at the Ryōgoku Kokugikan, in Tokyo.

Danshoku Dino was scheduled to appear in a singles match against Daisuke Sasaki, but he had to withdraw from the event due to complications following an appendectomy.

=== Storylines ===
The event featured matches that resulted from scripted storylines, where wrestlers portray heroes, villains, or less distinguishable characters in scripted events that build tension and culminate in a wrestling match or series of matches.

=== Event ===
The event started with the singles confrontation between Hinata Kasaki and Sanshiro Takagi solded with the victory of the latter. Next up, Harashima, Toru Owashi, and Naomi Yoshimura picked up a victory over Soma Takao, Shinichiro Kawamatsu, and Rukiya in six-man tag team competition. In the third bout, Hideki Okatani, MJ Paul, Demus, and Ilusion outmatched Daichi Satoh, Yuki Ishida, Kazuma Sumi, and Kumadori in eight-man tag team competition. Next up, To-y defeated Akito, Super Sasadango Machine, Kazuki Hirata and Antonio Honda in a Blindfold Deathmatch to secure the fourth consecutive defense of the DDT Extreme Championship in that respective reign. The fifth bout saw Jun Akiyama, Shinya Aoki, and Yuya Koroku defeat Tetsuya Endo, Hayata, and Junta Miyawaki in six-man tag team competition. Next up, Amakusa defeted Daisuke Sasaki in singles competition. In the seventh bout, Mao and Kanon defeated reigning champions Yuki Iino and Yukio Naya and the team of Chihiro Hashimoto and Yuu in three-way tag team competition to win the KO-D Tag Team Championship, ending the champions' reign at 127 days and five defenses. In the eighth bout, Zack Sabre Jr. defeated Chris Brookes in a Dramatic Dream match. In the semi main event, Konosuke Takeshita and Kaisei Takechi defeated Kazusada Higuchi and Takeshi Masada in tag team competition.

In the main event, Yuki Ueno defeated Minoru Suzuki to win the DDT Universal Championship in a winner takes all match which was also disputed for Ueno's KO-D Openweight Championship. He secured the second consecutive defense for the latter title while he ended Suzuki's Universal title reign at 228 days and five defenses.

== Results ==
No.	Results	Stipulations	Times
1	Sanshiro Takagi defeated Hinata Kasai	Singles match	7:07
2	Harashima, Toru Owashi, and Naomi Yoshimura defeated Soma Takao, Shinichiro Kawamatsu, and Rukiya	Six-man tag team match	10:05
3	Damnation T.A. (Hideki Okatani, MJ Paul, Demus, and Ilusion) defeated Daichi Sato, Yuki Ishida, Kazuma Sumi, and Kumadori	Eight-man tag team match	11:03
4	To-y (c) defeated Akito, Super Sasadango Machine, Kazuki Hirata and Antonio Honda	Five-way Blindfold Deathmatch for the DDT Extreme Championship	14:13
5	Jun Akiyama, Shinya Aoki, and Yuya Koroku defeated Tetsuya Endo, Hayata, and Junta Miyawaki	Six-man tag team match	14:52
6	Amakusa defeated Daisuke Sasaki	Singles match	16:23
7	Strange Love Connection (Mao and Kanon) (with Kimihiro) defeated The Apex (Yuki Iino and Yukio Naya) (c) and Team 200kg (Chihiro Hashimoto and Yuu)	Three-way tag team match for the KO-D Tag Team Championship	18:43
8	Zack Sabre Jr. defeated Chris Brookes	Dramatic Dream match	26:03
9	Konosuke Takeshita and Kaisei Takechi defeated Kazusada Higuchi and Takeshi Masada	Tag team match	24:14
10	Yuki Ueno (Openweight) defeated Minoru Suzuki (Universal)	Winner Takes All match for the KO-D Openweight Championship and the DDT Universal Championship	34:30
(c) / – the champion(s) heading into the match
