= Ultimate Party 2024 =

2024 DDT Pro-Wrestling event

- Promotional poster featuring various wrestlers
- Promotion: CyberFight
- Brand: DDT Pro-Wrestling
- Date: December 28, 2024
- City: Tokyo, Japan
- Venue: Ryōgoku Kokugikan
- Attendance: 3,579

Pay-per-view chronology
← Previous; God Bless DDT 2024	Next → Judgement 2025

Ultimate Party chronology
← Previous; 2023	Next → 2025

Ultimate Party 2024 was a professional wrestling event produced by CyberFight's DDT Pro-Wrestling (DDT). The event took place on December 28, 2024, in Tokyo at the Ryōgoku Kokugikan. It was the fourth event under the Ultimate Party chronology. The event aired live on AbemaTV and on DDT's streaming service Wrestle Universe.

Twelve matches were contested at the event. The main event saw Chris Brookes successfully defend the KO-D Openweight Championship against Daisuke Sasaki. In other prominent matches, The37Kamiina (Mao and To-y) defeated Burning (Tetsuya Endo and Yuya Koroku) for the vacant KO-D Tag Team Championship, and Pro Wrestling Noah's Kenoh and Yu Owada defeated Shinya Aoki and Keigo Nakamura.

== Production ==
=== Background ===
Ultimate Party is a professional wrestling event that was established by DDT Pro-Wrestling in 2019. The event was held a second time in 2020, but was discontinued. In May 2023, DDT announced the revival of the event, with the third Ultimate Party to take place on November 12, 2023, at the Ryōgoku Kokugikan, in Tokyo.

=== Storylines ===
The event featured matches that resulted from scripted storylines, where wrestlers portray heroes, villains, or less distinguishable characters in scripted events that build tension and culminate in a wrestling match or series of matches.

=== Event ===
The event started with the tag team confrontation between Demus and Ilusion, and Yuni and Kazuma Sumi, solded with the victory of the latter team. Next up, Shuji Ishikawa, Tomomitsu Matsunaga and Shinichiro Kawamatsu picked up a victory over Masahiro Takanashi, Daichi Satoh and Yuki Ishida in six-man tag team competition. The third bout saw Makoto Oishi and Akito defeat Kazuki Hirata and Kumadori in six seconds time, only for the match to restart and finally conclude with the victory of the latters. In the fifth match, Tokyo Joshi Pro Wrestling's Rika Tatsumi, Hyper Misao and Pom Harajuku defeated Toru Owashi, Super Sasadango Machine and Antonio Honda. Next up, Kanon, MJ Paul and Haruto Sakuraba outmatched Harashima, Yuki Iino and Soma Takao in six-man tag team competition. The seventh bout saw Jun Akiyama defeat Yukio Naya in singles competition. Next up, Pro Wrestling Noah's Kenoh and Yu Owada defeated Shinya Aoki and Keigo Nakamura in tag team competition. Next up, Invisible Man defeated Danshoku Dino in another singles bout. The tenth bout saw Yuki Ueno defeat Takeshi Masada. In the semi main event, Mao and To-y defeated Tetsuya Endo and Yuya Koroku to win the vacant KO-D Tag Team Championship.

In the main event, Chris Brookes defeated Daisuke Sasaki to secure the first successful defense of the KO-D Openweight Championship in that respective reign.

== Results ==
No.	Results	Stipulations	Times
1	Yuni and Kazuma Sumi defeated Demus and Ilusion by pinfall	Tag team match	9:05
2	Shuji Ishikawa, Tomomitsu Matsunaga and Shinichiro Kawamatsu defeated Masahiro Takanashi, Daichi Sato and Yuki Ishida by pinfall	Six-man tag team match	8:59
3	Makoto Oishi and Akito defeated Kazuki Hirata and Kumadori by pinfall	Tag team match	0:06
4	Kazuki Hirata and Kumadori defeated Makoto Oishi and Akito by pinfall	Tag team match	10:44
5	Rika Tatsumi, Hyper Misao and Pom Harajuku (with Tetsuya Koda) defeated Toru Owashi, Super Sasadango Machine and Antonio Honda (with Hisaya Imabayashi) by pinfall	Six-person tag team match	12:17
6	Damnation T.A. (Kanon and MJ Paul) and Haruto Sakuraba defeated Harashima, Yuki Iino and Soma Takao by pinfall	Six-man tag team match	12:52
7	Jun Akiyama defeated Yukio Naya by pinfall	Singles match	13:24
8	Kenoh and Yu Owada defeated Shinya Aoki and Keigo Nakamura by pinfall	Tag team match	11:41
9	Invisible Man defeated Danshoku Dino (with Tetsu Inada) by pinfall	Singles match	11:13
10	Yuki Ueno defeated Takeshi Masada by pinfall	Singles match	16:23
11	The37Kamiina (Mao and To-y) defeated Burning (Tetsuya Endo and Yuya Koroku) by pinfall	Tag team match for the vacant KO-D Tag Team Championship	24:17
12	Chris Brookes (c) defeated Daisuke Sasaki by pinfall	Singles match for the KO-D Openweight Championship	36:55
(c) / – the champion(s) heading into the match
