= King of Street Wrestling =

Professional wrestling tournament

- Promotions: CyberFight
- Brands: DDT Pro-Wrestling
- Date: Unknown (aired April 10–23, 2022)
- City: Various, Japan; Final: Nagano, Japan
- Venue: Various; Final: Kawanakajima Battleground

The King of Street Wrestling (Japanese: 路上プロレス世界一決定戦～King of Street Wrestling～, Hepburn: Rojō Puroresu Sekaiichi Ketteisen: King of Street Wrestling) was a professional wrestling tournament held by DDT Pro-Wrestling in its sub-brand Street Pro-Wrestling (路上プロレス, Rojō Puroresu), during which eight wrestlers from different promotions competed in street fights to determine who was the "best street wrestler in the world". Chris Brookes won the tournament on April 23, 2022, by defeating Abdullah Kobayashi in the final.

== Background ==
On March 20, 2022, at Judgement, it was announced that an eight-person street fight tournament would be held in April and broadcast on CyberFight's video on demand service Wrestle Universe. Every participant would represent their hometown and a championship title they have held. On March 25, the bracket, the dates and locations of the first round matches were revealed during a press conference.

Participants
Entrant	Representing	Title
(Japan) Sanshiro Takagi	Setagaya	KO-D Openweight Championship
(Japan) Shunma Katsumata	Chiba	DDT Extreme Championship
(United Kingdom) Chris Brookes	United Kingdom	DDT Universal Championship
(Thailand) Worawutnoi Keatchaiyong	Thailand	Surat Thani Province S Featherweight Championship
(Japan) Hikaru Machida	Akiruno	WPMF World Super Featherweight Championship
Onryo	"The Spirit World"	666 Disorder Openweight Championship
(Japan) Suzu Suzuki	Miyazaki	ICE×∞ Championship
(Japan) Abdullah Kobayashi	Yokohama	BJW Deathmatch Heavyweight Championship

== Tournament ==
The tournament aired between April 10 and 23.

First round (April 10)
Studio Flamme, Shin-Kiba, Tokyo
(United Kingdom) Chris Brookes	Casket (Note: This was a Casket Match.)
Onryo	15:43
Enoshima Beach, Fujisawa
(Japan) Hikaru Machida	KO (Note: This match was fought in rounds of 3 minutes.)
(Thailand) Worawutnoi Keatchaiyong	3R 1:20
BJW Dojo, Yokohama
(Japan) Abdullah Kobayashi	Pin
(Japan) Sanshiro Takagi	13:02
Kitaya Park, Shibuya, Tokyo
(Japan) Shunma Katsumata	Pin
(Japan) Suzu Suzuki	17:18

Semifinals (April 16)
Fumotoppara Campground, Shizuoka
(United Kingdom) Chris Brookes	Sub
(Japan) Hikaru Machida	22:24
Ofuronokuni Sauna, Yokohama
(Japan) Abdullah Kobayashi	Pin
(Japan) Shunma Katsumata	22:07

Final (April 23)
Kawanakajima Battleground, Nagano
(United Kingdom) Chris Brookes	Pin
(Japan) Abdullah Kobayashi	20:55

== See also ==
- CZW Tournament of Death
