= Dramatic Infinity 2024 =

2024 DDT Pro-Wrestling event

- Promotional poster featuring Kaisei Takechi
- Promotion: CyberFight
- Brand: DDT
- Date: September 29, 2024
- City: Tokyo, Japan
- Venue: Korakuen Hall
- Attendance: 1,650

Pay-per-view chronology
← Previous; Wrestle Peter Pan 2024	Next → God Bless DDT 2024

Dramatic Infinity chronology
← Previous; First	Next → 2025

Dramatic Infinity 2024 3-Hour Special was a professional wrestling event promoted by CyberFight's sub-brand DDT Pro-Wrestling (DDT). It took place on September 29, 2024, in Tokyo, Japan, at the Korakuen Hall. The event aired on CyberFight's streaming service Wrestle Universe.

Seven matches were contested at the event. The main event saw Kaisei Takechi and The37Kamiina (Mao and Yuki Ueno) defeat Schadenfreude International (Chris Brookes, Masahiro Takanashi and Takeshi Masada). Other top matches included Yuki Iino defeating Yukio Naya to retain the DDT Universal Championship, and Akito and Yuni defeated Kazuma Sumi and Shunma Katsumata in a One Light Tube Ippon Deathmatch for Katsumata's DDT Extreme Championship.

== Background ==
The event featured professional wrestling matches that resulted from scripted storylines, where wrestlers portrayed villains, heroes, or less distinguishable characters in the scripted events that built tension and culminated in a wrestling match or series of matches.

== Event ==
=== Preliminary matches ===
The event started with the tag team confrontation between Jun Akiyama and Keigo Nakamura, and Harashima and KO-D Openweight Champion Shinya Aoki, solded with the victory of the latter team. After the bout concluded, Harashima challenged Aoki for his Openweight Championship in a bout set to take place on October 20, 2024.

Next up, Tetsuya Endo, Yuya Koroku and Soma Takao picked up a victory over Kazuki Hirata, Toru Owashi and Yuki Ishida in six-man tag team competition.

The third bout saw KO-D 6-Man Tag Team Champions Daisuke Sasaki, MJ Paul and Kanon outmatching Antonio Honda, Ilusion and To-y in another six-man tag team confrontation.

In the fourth bout, Makoto Oishi defeated Danshoku Dino to win the Ironman Heavymetalweight Championship, only to lose it back to Dino after the match concluded.

The fifth bout saw Akito and Yuni teaming up against Shunma Katsumata and Kazuma Sumi in a One Light Tube Ippon Deathmatch in which Katsumata defended his DDT Extreme Championship. Akito and Yuni won the match when Yuni performed a top rope diving foot stomp onto Katsumata and Sumi while they were being maintained on top of the light tube by Akito. The light tube broke, scoring the match in favor of Akito and Yuni. After the bout concluded, Akito nominated Danshoku Dino as his next challenger in a bout which was set to take place on October 20, 2024.

In the semi main event, Yuki Iino defeated Yukio Naya to secure the first successful defense of the DDT Universal Championship. After the bout concluded, To-y challenged Iino to a title match which was set to take place on October 13, 2024.

=== Main event ===
In the main event, The37Kamiina (Mao and Yuki Ueno) and The Rampage from Exile Tribe member Kaisei Takechi defeated Schadenfreude International (Chris Brookes, Masahiro Takanashi and Takeshi Masada) in a six-man tag team match, which was Takechi's second ever professional wrestling bout.

== Results ==
No.	Results	Stipulations	Times
1	Shinya Aoki and Harashima defeated Jun Akiyama and Keigo Nakamura by pinfall	Tag team match	12:20
2	Burning (Tetsuya Endo and Yuya Koroku) and Soma Takao defeated Kazuki Hirata, Toru Owashi and Yuki Ishida by pinfall	Six-man tag team match	10:51
3	Damnation T.A (Daisuke Sasaki, MJ Paul and Kanon) defeated Schadenfreude International (Antonio Honda and Ilusion) and To-y by pinfall	Six-man tag team match	11:39
4	Makoto Oishi defeated Danshoku Dino (c) by submission	Singles match for the Ironman Heavymetalweight Championship	10:33
5	Akito and Yuni defeated Shunma Katsumata (c) and Kazuma Sumi by ippon	One Light Tube Ippon Deathmatch for the DDT Extreme Championship	15:02
6	Yuki Iino (c) defeated Yukio Naya by pinfall	Singles match for the DDT Universal Championship	17:04
7	Kaisei Takechi and The37Kamiina (Mao and Yuki Ueno) defeated Schadenfreude International (Chris Brookes, Masahiro Takanashi and Takeshi Masada) by pinfall	Six-man tag team match	25:11
(c) / – the champion(s) heading into the match
