= DDT Ultimate Party =

Ultimate Party
- Promotions: DDT Pro-Wrestling (2019); CyberFight (2020–present)
- Brands: DDT Pro-Wrestling (2020–present)
- First event: Ultimate Party 2019

Ultimate Party is a recurring professional wrestling event promoted by DDT Pro-Wrestling (DDT). Originally held by DDT as an independent promotion in 2019, it has since been held by CyberFight as a DDT-branded event. The event is usually held in November and airs as an internet pay-per-view (iPPV) on CyberFight's streaming service Wrestle Universe and on AbemaTV.

== History ==
In 2019, Ultimate Party was produced by DDT Pro-Wrestling, an independent promotion founded in 1997 by Shintaro Muto and Pro Wrestling Crusaders alumni Kyohei Mikami, Kazushige Nosawa and Sanshiro Takagi. In 2020, DDT and its subsidiaries merged with Pro Wrestling Noah into a new company called CyberFight owned by the digital advertising company CyberAgent, with DDT and Noah persisting as separate brands under the CyberFight umbrella. Ultimate Party has since been held as a DDT-branded event.

== Events ==
Event	Date	City	Venue	Main event	Ref(s)
Ultimate Party 2019	November 3, 2019	Tokyo, Japan	Ryōgoku Kokugikan	Konosuke Takeshita (KO-D) vs. Harashima (Extreme) for the KO-D Openweight Championship and the DDT Extreme Championship	
Ultimate Party 2020	November 3, 2020	Tokyo, Japan	Ota City General Gymnasium	Tetsuya Endo (c) vs. Daisuke Sasaki for the KO-D Openweight Championship	
Ultimate Party 2023	November 12, 2023	Tokyo, Japan	Ryōgoku Kokugikan	Chris Brookes (c) vs. Yuki Ueno for the KO-D Openweight Championship	
Ultimate Party 2024	December 28, 2024	Tokyo, Japan	Ryōgoku Kokugikan	Chris Brookes (c) vs. Daisuke Sasaki for the KO-D Openweight Championship	
Ultimate Party 2025	November 3, 2025	Tokyo, Japan	Ryōgoku Kokugikan	Yuki Ueno (Openweight) vs. Minoru Suzuki (Universal) for the KO-D Openweight Championship and the DDT Universal Championship	
(c) – refers to the champion(s) heading into the match
