= Ultimate Party 2020 =

2020 DDT Pro-Wrestling event

- Promotional poster featuring most of the participants
- Promotion: CyberFight
- Brand: DDT Pro-Wrestling
- Date: November 3, 2020
- City: Tokyo, Japan
- Venue: Ota City General Gymnasium
- Attendance: Undisclosed
- Tagline: Let's Watch DDT Pro-Wrestling Together!

Pay-per-view chronology
← Previous; Peter Pan 2020	Next → Kawasaki Strong 2021

Ultimate Party chronology
← Previous; 2019	Next → 2023

Ultimate Party 2020 was a professional wrestling event produced by CyberFight's DDT Pro-Wrestling (DDT). The event took place on November 3, 2020, in Tokyo at the Ota City General Gymnasium. It was the second event under the Ultimate Party chronology. The event aired live on AbemaTV and on DDT's streaming service Wrestle Universe.

Ten matches were contested at the event, including two on the pre-show. The main event saw Tetsuya Endo successfully retain the KO-D Openweight Championship against Daisuke Sasaki. Other top matches include Yuki Ueno defeating Chris Brookes to win the DDT Universal Championship, and Sanshiro Takagi defeating Shinya Aoki in a Weapon Rumble match to win the DDT Extreme Championship.

== Storylines ==
The show featured ten matches that resulted from scripted storylines, where wrestlers portray heroes, villains, or less distinguishable characters in scripted events that build tension and culminate in a wrestling match or series of matches.

On August 23, 2020, Tetsuya Endo won the annual King of DDT tournament by defeating T-Hawk in the finals. Usually, the winner of the tournament would receive a shot at the KO-D Openweight Championship, but since Endo was already holding the title, he was allowed to choose his challenger. Endo initially named Kenny Omega, a former DDT full-time member, but due to the COVID-19 pandemic, travel restrictions prevented the match from happening. At Get Alive 2020, Endo chose his Damnation stablemate Daisuke Sasaki to be his challenger instead. On September 27, at Who's Gonna Top? 2020, Sasaki hit Endo with a low blow and ordered the rest of Damnation and #StrongHearts to beat Endo up. They refused and attacked Sasaki instead before announcing he was being kicked out of the unit. In a following interview, Sasaki refused to acknowledge his eviction and promised that he would leave DDT if he failed to defeat Endo. On October 3, at "This Will Be Our Third Narimasu Event! 2020", a handicap match pitting Sasaki against the team of Endo and T-Hawk ended in a disqualification when Damnation interfered in order to attack Sasaki. Hiroshi Yamato came to Sasaki's rescue and the match was restarted as a regular tag team match that Yamato and Sasaki were unable to win.

In February, Chris Brookes became the inaugural DDT Universal Champion, a title created to attract an international viewership to DDT's programming. By June, he was already a two-time champion, and after defending his title against Naomi Yoshimura on October 10, at DDT TV Show! #9, he called his opponent weak. Unhappy about the insult, Yoshimura's tag team partner Yuki Ueno came out to challenge Brookes to a title match. Days later, at a press conference, Brookes presented Ueno with flowers as if he was already mourning Ueno's KO-D Tag Team Championship title reign and the end of his tag team as Yoshimura was scheduled to take a medical leave of absence following the Ultimate Party event.

== Results ==
No.	Results	Stipulations	Times
1^{P}	Hideki Okatani defeated Keigo Nakamura	Singles match	04:24
2^{P}	Hiroshi Yamato and Hoshitango defeated Mizuki Watase and Yukio Naya by submission	Tag team match	09:00
3	Mao defeated Shunma Katsumata	Singles match	07:51
4	Akito defeated Danshoku Dino by submission	Singles match	09:51
5	Eruption (Kazusada Higuchi, Yukio Sakaguchi and Saki Akai) defeated Disaster Box (Toru Owashi, Naomi Yoshimura and Kazuki Hirata), #DamnHearts (Mad Paulie, El Lindaman and Nobuhiro Shimatani) and Super Sasadango Machine, Makoto Oishi and Antonio Honda	Four-way elimination match	11:03
6	Sanshiro Takagi defeated Shinya Aoki (c)	Weapon Rumble match for the DDT Extreme Championship	10:55
7	CimaSoma (Cima and Soma Takao) defeated HarashiMarufuji (Harashima and Naomichi Marufuji)	Tag team match	12:47
8	Yuki Ueno defeated Chris Brookes (c)	Singles match for the DDT Universal Championship	14:05
9	Jun Akiyama defeated Konosuke Takeshita by submission	Singles match	25:38
10	Tetsuya Endo (c) defeated Daisuke Sasaki (with Hiroshi Yamato)	Singles match for the KO-D Openweight Championship	27:48
(c) / – the champion(s) heading into the match; P / – the match was broadcast on the pre-show

=== Four-way elimination match ===
Elimination	Wrestler	Team	Eliminated by	Method	Time
1	Nobuhiro Shimatani	#DamnHearts	Kazuki Hirata	Pinfall	07:12
2	Antonio Honda	Super Sasadango Machine, Makoto Oishi and Antonio Honda	Kazuki Hirata	Pinfall	09:50
3	Kazuki Hirata	Disaster Box	Yukio Sakaguchi	Pinfall	11:03
Winners:	Eruption (Kazusada Higuchi, Yukio Sakaguchi and Saki Akai)				
