= Ryuya Takekura =

Japanese professional wrestler

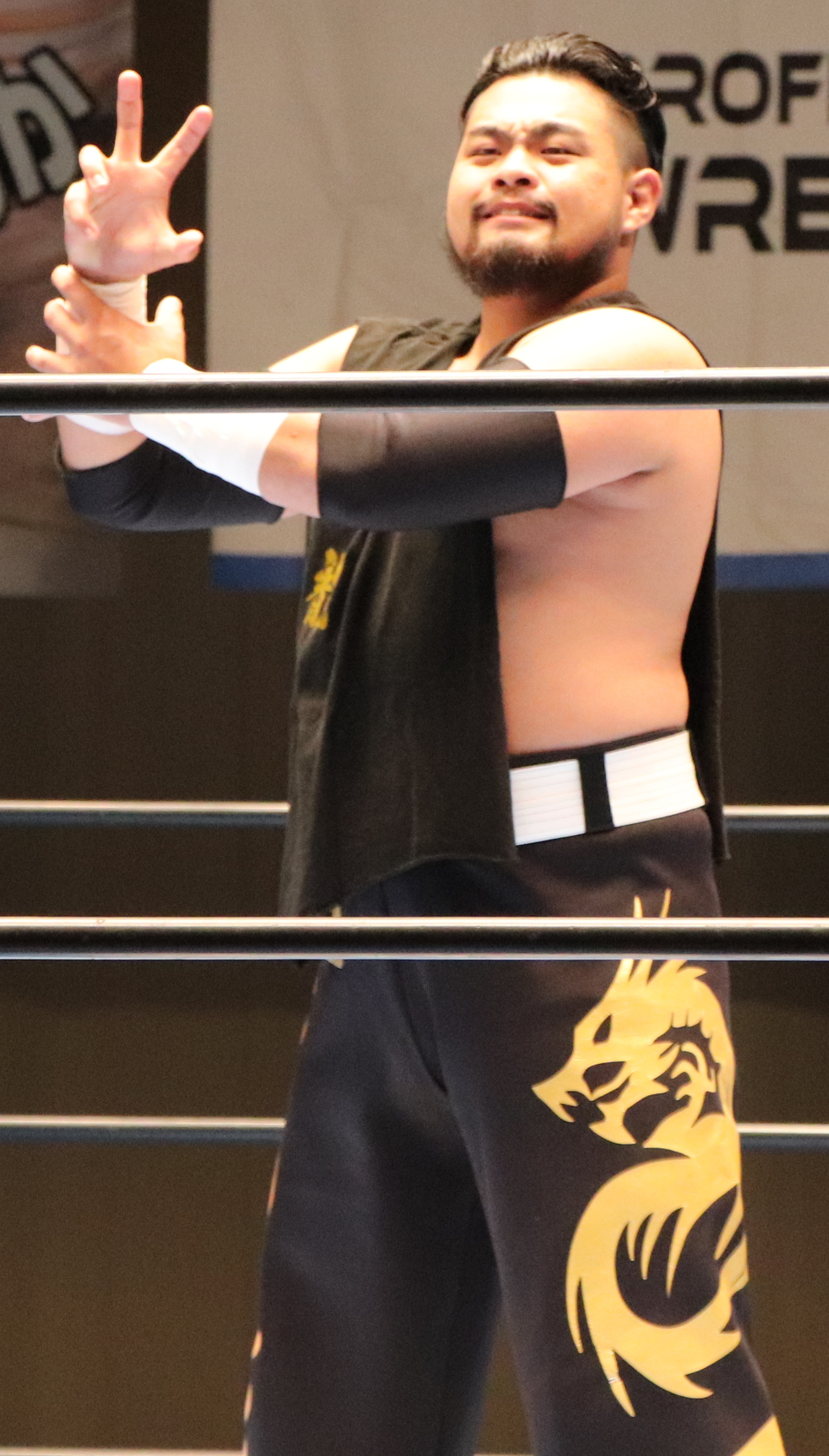
- Takekura in September 2020

Personal information
- Born: 26 June 1995 (age 31) Musashimurayama, Tokyo, Japan

Professional wrestling career
- Ring name: Ryuya Takekura
- Billed height: 185 cm (6 ft 1 in)
- Billed weight: 115 kg (254 lb)
- Trained by: Taka Michinoku
- Debut: 2019

Ryuya Takekura (武蔵龍也, Takekura Ryūya) is a Japanese professional wrestler signed to Professional Wrestling Just Tap Out (JTO) where he is a former three-time King of JTO Champion. He is also known for freelance work with various promotions from the Japanese independent scene.

== Professional wrestling career ==
=== Japanese independent circuit (2019–present) ===
Takekura made his professional wrestling debut at TAKATaichiMania II, an independent event produced by his coach Taka Michinoku and Taichi, on May 7, 2019, where he fell short to Shota Umino in singles competition. He took part in other events of the "TakaTaichi Produce Season 3". On December 14, 2024, he teamed up with Tomoaki Honma to defeat Ryoma Tsukamoto and Abdullah Kobayashi.

At GLEAT Ver. 5, an event promoted by Gleat on January 8, 2023, he teamed up with Masayoshi Miyairi in a losing effort against Takanori Ito and Yu Iizuka as a result of a UWF rules match. Takekura participated in the 2024 edition of Pro Wrestling Zero1's Fire Festival, where he placed himself in the B block of the competition, scoring a total of ten points after going against Koji Doi, Yuko Miyamoto, Chris Vice, Tatsuya Hanami and Blazer Tannai, failing to qualify for the finals. At Tenryu Project Bridge Of Dreams, an event promoted by Tenryu Project on May 6, 2024, Takekura teamed up with Masato Shibata to defeat Ryoma Tsukamoto and Masayuki Kono.

=== Professional Wrestling Just Tap Out (2019–present) ===
Takekura made his debut in Professional Wrestling Just Tap Out at JTO Hajime on July 8, 2019, where he defeated Kanon. He is a former three-time King of JTO Champion, having won it last at JTO 4th Anniversary on July 17, 2023, where he defeated Ren Ayabe. He is part of the "Myo-o" stable since 2023.

He won the 2022 JTO Tournament in which he defeated Arata in the first rounds, Fire Katsumi in the semifinals, and Ren Ayabe in the finals in a match which was also disputed for the King of JTO title.

== Championships and accomplishments ==
- Professional Wrestling Just Tap Out
  - King of JTO Championship (4 times)
  - JTO Tag Team Championship (1 time) - with Bomber Tetsuya
  - JTO Tournament (2022)
  - Dream Challenge Tournament (2021)
