= Koju Takeda =

Japanese professional wrestler

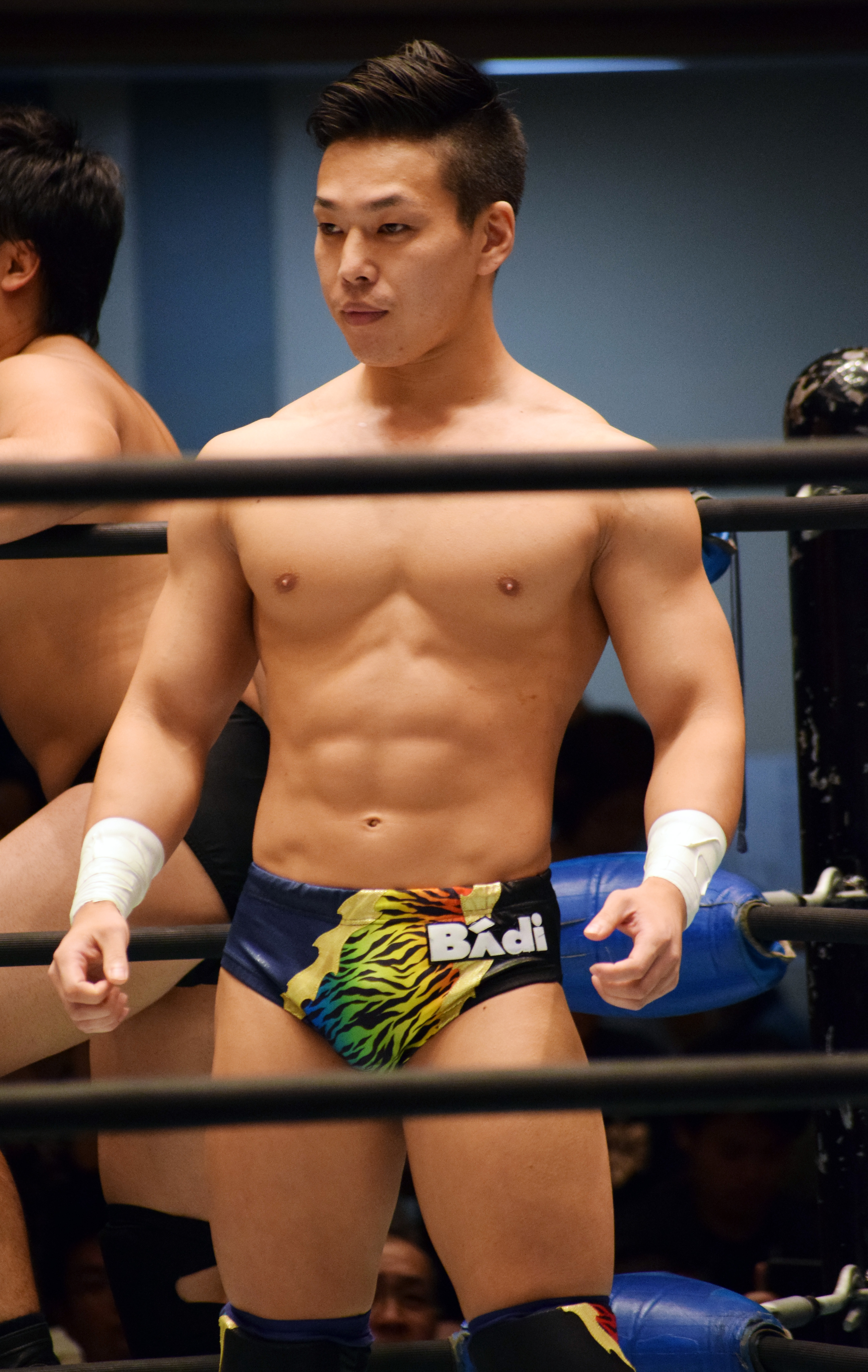
- Takeda in August 2019

Personal information
- Born: May 8, 1991 (age 35) Iwate, Japan

Professional wrestling career
- Ring names: Garlin Shoe Perros C; Lady Koju; Koju Takeda; Koju "Shining Ball" Takeda
- Billed height: 170 cm (5 ft 7 in)
- Billed weight: 70 kg (154 lb)
- Debut: 2017
- Retired: 2026

Koju Takeda (竹田光珠, Takeda Kōju) (born May 8, 1991) is a Japanese retired professional wrestler best known for his tenures with the Japanese promotions DDT Pro-Wrestling and Wrestling of Darkness 666.

== Professional wrestling career ==
=== DDT Pro-Wrestling (2017–2026) ===
Takeda made his debut in DDT Pro-Wrestling in late 2017 in the "DNA" series. However, his notable work began at DDT Dramatic Nerima The Fighter, an event promoted February 3, 2018, where he teamed up with Daiki Shimomura and Yuki Ueno in a losing effort against Shuten Doji (Kota Umeda, Masahiro Takanashi and Yukio Sakaguchi) as a result of a six-man tag team match.

Takeda is known for competing in various of the promotion's signature pay-per-views. His first event was the Judgement 2018: DDT 21st Anniversary on March 25, 2018, where he teamed up with Kota Umeda and Yuki Ueno to defeat Shuten-dōji (Kudo, Masahiro Takanashi and Yukio Sakaguchi) to win the KO-D 6-Man Tag Team Championship.

After an almost four-year hiatus with the company, Takeda returned and joined the unit of "Pheromones" and challenged former tag team partner Yuki Ueno to a match for the latter's DDT Universal Championship. At Wrestle Peter Pan 2022 on August 25, Takeda teamed up with his stablemates Danshoku Dino and Yuki Iino to defeat Yuji Hino, Yukio Naya and Super Sasadango Machine and Disaster Box (Toru Owashi and Kazuki Hirata) and Antonio Honda. At DDT God Bless DDT 2022 on October 23, he unsuccessfully challenged Ueno for the DDT Universal Championship. At Never Mind 2022 on December 29, Takeda is scheduled to team up with his stablemates Danshoku Dino, Yuki Iino and Yumehito Imanari in a Losing unit must disband match against Akito, Shunma Katsumata, Osamu Nishimura and Shinichiro Kawamatsu.

=== Big Japan Pro Wrestling (2018–2026) ===
Takeda often makes appearances for the deathmatch promotion Big Japan Pro Wrestling. His most notable ones were part of the promotion's top annual tournaments. On the finals of the 2022 Ikkitousen Strong Climb, he teamed up with Kota Sekifuda and Tatsuhiko Yoshino to defeat Chicharito Shoki, Kosuke Sato and Shinya Ishida. On the thirteenth night of the 2022 Saikyo Tag League from October 17, Takeda teamed up with Takuho Kato and Tatsuhiko Yoshino in a losing effort against Kazumi Kikuta, Ryota Hama and Yasufumi Nakanoue as a result of a six-man tag team match.

=== Wrestling of Darkness 666 (2019–2026) ===
Takeda made his debut in Wrestling of Darkness 666 at 666 Vol. 90/Shinjuku 2-Chome Shinobu Debut 15th Anniversary Memorial on June 6, 2019, where he teamed up with Fuminori Abe, Taro Yamada and Konaka and competed in a Four-way eight-man tag team match won by Banana Senga, Hiroaki Taniguchi, Guts Ishijima and Yanagwa, and also involving Akkun Ohashi, Jun Kasai, Masashi Takeda and Takayuki Ueki, and Nene Dai, Onryo, Shinobu and Yuko Miyamoto. On the same night, he competed for the second time as he won a pants battle royal involving the same opponents as in the precedent match. 666 and Ice Ribbon co-promoted the 666 Vol. 99 Halloween, an event which took place on November 8, 2020, where Takeda competed on two separate occasions. In first of them he defeated dropped the Triangle Ribbon Championship which he captured one week earlier to Ram Kaicho in a three-way match also involving Fuminori Abe, and in the second one, he competed in a battle royal won by Taro Yamada and also involving notable opponents such as Risa Sera, Suzu Suzuki, Hiragi Kurumi, Mochi Miyagi, Maika Ozaki and others. Takeda is also known for competing in the world title scene as he unsuccessfully faced Konaka for the 666 Disorder Openweight Championship at 666 Vol. 115 on April 2, 2022.

Takeda announced his retirement from wrestling in late 2025. His final match took place on March 4, 2026, where he teamed up with Onryo to defeat Ken and Shinobu.

== Championships and accomplishments ==
- DDT Pro-Wrestling
  - KO-D 6-Man Tag Team Championship (1 time) – with Yuki Ueno and Kota Umeda
- Japan Indie Awards
  - Best Unit Award (2022) – with Pheromones
- Ice Ribbon
  - Triangle Ribbon Championship (1 time)
- Mobius
  - Kin No Fundoshi Championship (1 time)
- Total Triumph Team
  - TTT Indie Unified Six Man Tag Team Championship (2 time) – with Garlin Shoe Perros B and Syuou Fujiwara (1) and Banana Senga and Maya Yukihi (1)
- Wrestling of Darkness 666
  - 666 Disorder Openweight Championship (1 time)
  - Shinjuku Ni-chōme Pro-Wrestling ILNP Championship (1 time)
  - One Night Tag Tournament (2020) – with Yuko Miyamoto
  - Tag Team Tournament (2021) – with Yusuke Kodama
  - One Night Six Man Tag Tournament (2022) – with Banana Senga and Konaka
  - Battle Royal (2025)
