= Ultimate Party 2023 =

2023 DDT Pro-Wrestling event

- Promotional poster featuring most of the participants
- Promotion: CyberFight
- Brand: DDT Pro-Wrestling
- Date: November 12, 2023
- City: Tokyo, Japan
- Venue: Ryōgoku Kokugikan
- Attendance: 4,785

Pay-per-view chronology
← Previous; Wrestle Peter Pan 2023	Next → Sweet Dreams! 2024

Ultimate Party chronology
← Previous; 2020	Next → 2024

Ultimate Party 2023 was a professional wrestling event produced by CyberFight's DDT Pro-Wrestling (DDT). The event took place on November 12, 2023, in Tokyo at the Ryōgoku Kokugikan. It was the third event under the Ultimate Party chronology. The event aired live on AbemaTV and on DDT's streaming service Wrestle Universe.

Twelve matches were contested at the event, including two on the pre-show. The main event saw Yuki Ueno defeat Chris Brookes to win the KO-D Openweight Championship. Other top matches included Chris Jericho defeating Konosuke Takeshita, and Mao defeated Matt Cardona to win the DDT Universal Championship.

== Production ==
=== Background ===
Ultimate Party is a professional wrestling event that was established by DDT Pro-Wrestling in 2019. The event was held a second time in 2020, but was discontinued. In May 2023, DDT announced the revival of the event, with the third Ultimate Party to take place on November 12, 2023, at the Ryōgoku Kokugikan, in Tokyo.

=== Storylines ===
The show featured matches that resulted from scripted storylines, where wrestlers portray heroes, villains, or less distinguishable characters in scripted events that build tension and culminate in a wrestling match or series of matches.

On August 27, it was announced that New Japan Pro-Wrestling's Hiromu Takahashi would be appearing at Ultimate Party 2023. At DDT Big Bang 2023, Kazuki Hirata defended the DDT Extreme Championship while capturing the Ironman Heavymetalweight Championship by defeating Naruki Doi. After the match, Takahashi appeared and reminded Hirata of their past confrontations in NJPW's NEVER brand and DDT's Wakate Tsūshin series of events. He then challenged him and the match was made official.

At Who's Gonna Top? 2023, Chris Brookes achieved his second successful defense of the KO-D Openweight Championship against Saki Akai. He was then challenged by Yuki Ueno and immediately accepted the challenge.

=== Event ===
The event started with two matches broadcast live on DDT's YouTube channel. In the first bout, Soma Takao and Shota defeated Masahiro Takanashi and Antonio Honda to successfully defend the KO-D Tag Team Championship for the first time in that respective reign. In the second bout, Yusuke Okada and Yuya Koroku picked up a victory over the teams of Kanon and MJ Paul, Naruki Doi and Kazuma Sumi, Toy Kojima and Yuki Ishida and Yuni and Rukiya in a Rumble rules tag team battle royal.

In the first main card match, Tokyo Joshi Pro-Wrestling's Yuki Arai, Moka Miyamoto and Shino Suzuki defeated Suzume, Arisu Endo and Wakana Uehara. Next up, Yoshitatsu, Yoshihiko, Danshoku Dino and Super Sasadango Machine defeated Sanshiro Takagi, Akito, Makoto Oishi and Shinichiro Kawamatsu in a special stipulation match in which the winner was the one who made the opponent kneel on the ground and apologize. Next up, a returning Kuroshio Tokyo Japan defeated Takeshi Masada in singles competition. In the sixth bout, Jun Akiyama, Harashima and Yukio Naya defeated All Japan Pro Wrestling's Voodoo-Murders (Jun Saito, Rei Saito and Toshizo). Next, Daisuke Sasaki defeated Tetsuya Endo via knockout. In the eighth bout, Naomichi Marufuji, Kazusada Higuchi and Miyu Yamashita defeated Eruption (Saki Akai, Yukio Sakaguchi and Hideki Okatani) in what was Akai's official retirement match. After the bout concluded, she received a retirement ceremony where various superstars such as Hiroshi Tanahashi, Togi Makabe and Genichiro Tenryu reached out via video to pay homage for her career. Upon Akai's retirement, the KO-D 6-Man Tag Team Championship were subsequently vacated by herself, Yukio Sakaguchi and Hideki Okatani.

In the ninth match, Hiromu Takahashi defended the Ironman Heavymetalweight Championship against Kazuki Hirata in a special multiple-stipulation match which consisted of multiple settlements decided by a spinning wheel. The comedic bout took place under the stipulation of a musical deatchmatch, a handicap match in which Takahashi teamed up with Yoshihiko, two dancing contests, and a blindfold bra removal. Takahashi picked up the win, but moments after he pinned Hirata, he was lying down to the canvas, moment in which his IWGP Junior Heavyweight Championship belt which was lying on his chest pinned him to win the Ironman title. Seconds later, Hirata pinned Takahashi's junior belt to take the Ironman belt. Before both clearing the ring out, Takahashi once again tried to pin Hirata but unsuccessfully. After the chaotic scene ended, Takahashi performed one last dance in the ring, moment in which he was jumped and kissed by Danshoku Dino.

In the tenth bout, Mao defeated Matt Cardona to win the DDT Universal Championship for the second time in his career, ending Cardona's title on his second defense. In the semi main event, All Elite Wrestling's Chris Jericho defeated Konosuke Takeshita by submission after hitting his signature "Walls of Jericho" move.

In the main event, Yuki Ueno defeated Chris Brookes to win the KO-D Openweight Championship.

== Results ==
No.	Results	Stipulations	Times
1^{P}	Romance Dawn (Soma Takao and Shota) (c) defeated Masahiro Takanashi and Antonio Honda by pinfall	Tag team match for the KO-D Tag Team Championship	7:46
2^{P}	Burning (Yusuke Okada and Yuya Koroku) defeated Damnnation T.A (Kanon and MJ Paul), Naruki Doi and Kazuma Sumi, Toy Kojima and Yuki Ishida and Yuni and Rukiya by pinfall	Rumble rules tag team battle royal	9:08
3	Yuki Arai, Moka Miyamoto and Shino Suzuki defeated Daisy Monkey (Suzume and Arisu Endo) and Wakana Uehara by pinfall	Six-woman tag team match	11:15
4	Yoshitatsu, Yoshihiko, Danshoku Dino and Super Sasadango Machine defeated Sanshiro Takagi, Akito, Makoto Oishi and Shinichiro Kawamatsu by pinfall	Eight-man tag team dogeza match	8:20
5	Kuroshio Tokyo Japan defeated Takeshi Masada by pinfall	Singles match	13:14
6	Jun Akiyama, Harashima and Yukio Naya defeated Voodoo-Murders (Jun Saito, Rei Saito and Toshizo) by pinfall	Six-man tag team match	10:11
7	Daisuke Sasaki defeated Tetsuya Endo via knockout	Singles match	14:20
8	Naomichi Marufuji, Kazusada Higuchi and Miyu Yamashita defeated Eruption (Saki Akai, Yukio Sakaguchi and Hideki Okatani) by pinfall	Six-person tag team match This was Akai's retirement match.	20:03
9	Hiromu Takahashi (c) defeated Kazuki Hirata by pinfall	Multiple stipulation match for the Ironman Heavymetalweight Championship	17:37
10	Mao defeated Matt Cardona (c) (with Steph De Lander) by pinfall	Singles match for the DDT Universal Championship	16:50
11	Chris Jericho defeated Konosuke Takeshita by submission	Singles match	23:32
12	Yuki Ueno defeated Chris Brookes (c) by pinfall	Singles match for the KO-D Openweight Championship	29:39
(c) / – the champion(s) heading into the match; P / – the match was broadcast on the pre-show
