= Wrestling of Darkness 666 =

Japanese professional wrestling

- Triple Six logo
- Founded: 2003
- Style: Puroresu; Comedy wrestling
- Headquarters: Shinjuku, Tokyo, Japan
- Founder(s): Onryo and The Crazy SKB
- Owner: Onryo
- Website: triplesix.jp

Wrestling of Darkness 666 (Japanese: 暗黒プロレス組織666, Hepburn: Ankoku Puroresu Soshiki Toripuru Shikkusu), also known as the Wrestling of Darkness Organization 666 and often referred to simply as 666 or Triple Six, is a Japanese professional wrestling promotion based in Shinjuku, Tokyo, Japan. The promotion was founded in 2003 by Onryo and Qp-Crazy frontman The Crazy SKB.

== History ==
On December 13, 2003, Onryo and The Crazy SKB co-produced a professional wrestling event in Tokyo that would become known as "666 vol. 1." The first events were mostly held at the Tokyo Battle Sphere until the promotion was banned from the venue that deemed their performances too extreme. Triple Six moved to the Differ Ariake arena which ended up also banning the promotion after The Crazy SKB destroyed equipment and broke into the Pro Wrestling Noah office. Today, the promotion holds most of its shows at the Shin-Kiba 1st Ring arena.

Triple Six also promotes three sub-brands: Shinjuku Ni-chōme Pro-Wrestling which began as a collaboration with the gay magazine Badi, Young Pro-Wrestling Wasshoi which features younger wrestlers, and Young Ribbon Wasshoi, a joint venture with women's wrestling promotion Ice Ribbon.

=== Succession of presidents ===
The Crazy SKB was considered the first president of the organization. Since his storyline disappearance, several wrestlers took over the presidency and adopted the title of "Crazy SKB".

- 1st: The Crazy SKB
- 2nd: Ultraman Robin
- 3rd: Tigers Mask
- 4th: Senpai
- 5th: Kurumi
- 6th: Batten Tamagawa
- 7th: Hirotsugu Suyama
- 8th: Kana
- 9th: Higanbana Dokumi

== Roster ==
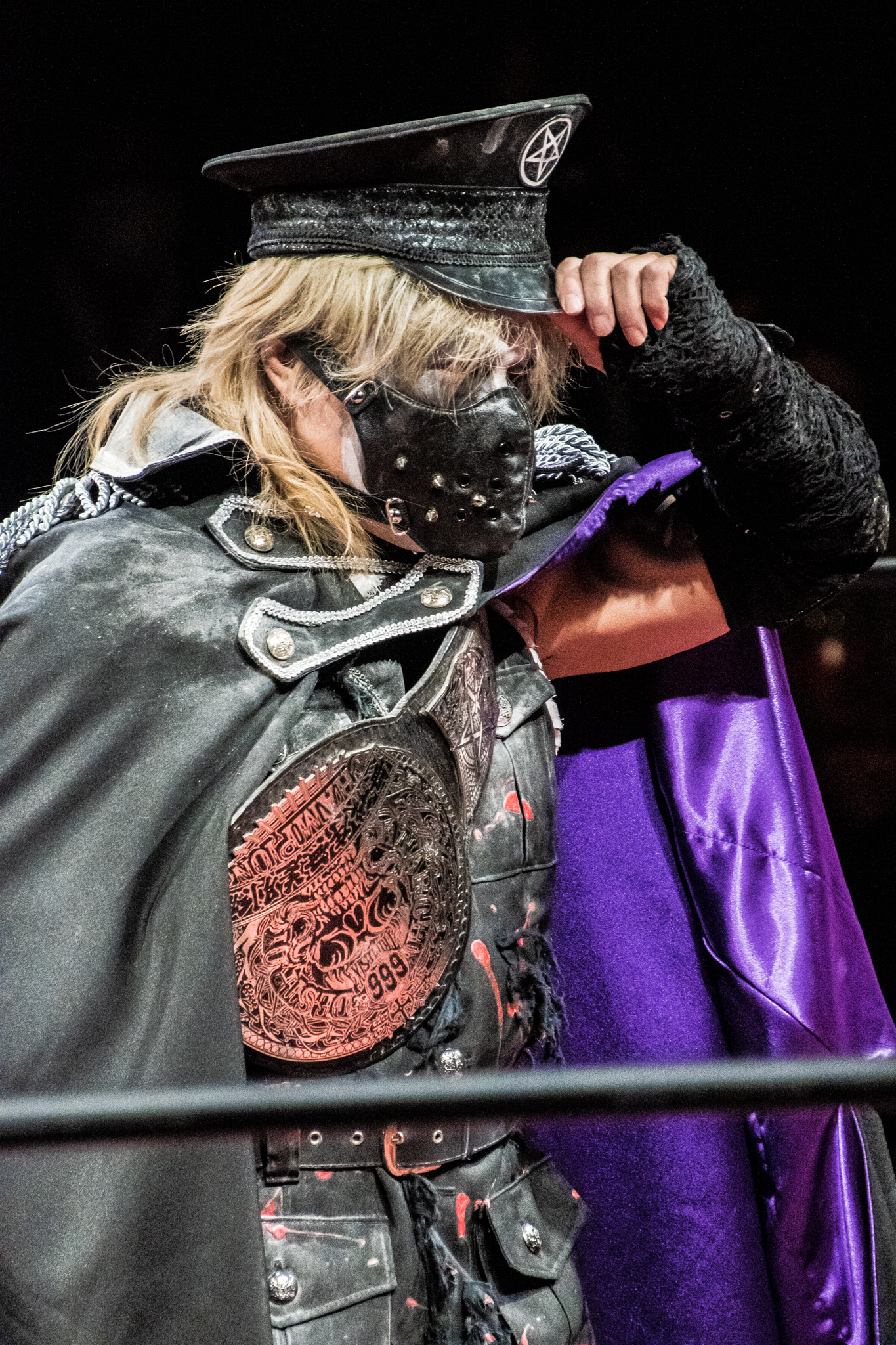
Onryo

Ring name	Real name	Notes
Dark Shaman Morinosu	Unknown	
Dynasty	Unknown	
Jumbo Lee Burbridge	Unknown	
K666	Unknown	
Ken	Unknown	
Kojiki	Unknown	
Koju Takeda	Koju Takeda	
Konaka=Pahalwhan	Unknown	
Mame Endo	Unknown	
Nene Mugen D.a.i	Unknown	
Onryo	Ryo Matsuri	
Ram Kaicho	Unknown	
Ryuya Kamishiro	Unknown	
Senpai	Unknown	
Shinobu	Shinobu Sugawara	
Taro Yamada	Unknown	Also wrestles masked as Kagura
Yanagawa	Unknown	
Yuko Miyamoto	Yuko Miyamoto	

== Championships ==
=== Current championships ===
Championship	Current champion(s)	Reign	Date won	Days held	Successful defenses	Location	Notes	Ref.
666 Disorder Openweight Championship	Maika Ozaki	1	May 8, 2026	158+	1	Tokyo, Japan	Defeated Kagura at 666 vol. 161.	
666 Locomotiveweight Championship	Vacant	—	August 9, 2026	—	—	Tokyo, Japan	Kagura teamed with Onryo to defeat previous champion Yanagawa and Shota Kawakami in a tag team match at 666 vol. 184, then immediately vacated the title.	
Shinjuku Ni-chōme Pro-Wrestling ILNP Championship	Masato Kamino	1	January 1, 2025	650+	1	Tokyo, Japan	Defeated Kohei Kinoshita at Shinjuku Ni-chōme Pro-Wrestling Petit Nicho!: Shinobu's 20th Debut Anniversary.	

=== Inactive championships ===
Championship	Last champion(s)	Reign	Date won	Location	Notes	Ref.
666 Welterweight Championship	Quidam	1	October 29, 2009	Unknown	The championship was defended in 666 Mexico, 666's Mexican branch, but was retired after 666 Mexico rebranded as Radical Shoot Fighting Wrestling.	
Young Ribbon Mixed Tag Team Championship	Risa Sera and Yuko Miyamoto	1	March 24, 2013	Warabi, Japan	Defeated Taro Yamada and Tsukushi to win the vacant title. The title, also recognized by Ice Ribbon, has been left inactive.	

== Broadcaster ==
- Niconico (2014–present)

== See also ==
- Professional wrestling in Japan
- List of professional wrestling promotions in Japan
