= Young Ribbon Mixed Tag Team Championship =

Professional wrestling championship

Details
- Promotion: 666; Ice Ribbon
- Date established: 2011
- Current champion(s): Yuko Miyamoto and Risa Sera
- Date won: March 23, 2013
Statistics
- First champion(s): Team Phoenix (Dynasty and Hikari Minami)

The Young Ribbon Mixed Tag Team Championship (Japanese: ヤングリボン認定ミックスタッグ王座, Hepburn: Yangu Ribon-nintei Mikkusu Taggu Ōza) is an inactive professional wrestling mixed tag team championship co-promoted by the Wrestling of Darkness 666 (Triple Six) and Ice Ribbon promotions. The title was established in 2011. There have been two reigns among two teams. Yuko Miyamoto and Risa Sera are the current champions in their first reign.

== History ==
On July 18, 2011, Team Phoenix (Hikari Minami and Dynasty) defeated Team Yankee Ribbon (Yuko Miyamoto and Chii Tomiya) in the final of a 4-team "Mixed Tag Team 1-Day tournament". Following their victory, they were awarded the inaugural title on September 9.

After two successful defenses, the title was vacated in March 2013 due to a lack of defenses. On March 24, Yuko Miyamoto and Risa Sera defeated Taro Yamada and Tsukushi to win the vacant title. The title has not been defended since, nor has it been officially deactivated.

=== Inaugural tournament ===
Semifinals
Team I Love Miyagi (Shinobu and Mochi Miyagi)	7:08
Team Yankee Ribbon (Yuko Miyamoto and Chii Tomiya)	Pin
Team Phoenix (Dynasty and Hikari Minami)	Pin
Team 53 Stations of the Yōkaidō (Note: Chīmu Yōkaidō Gojūsantsugi (チーム妖怪道五十三次)) (Konaka Pahalwan and Neko Nitta)	5:49

Final
Team Yankee Ribbon	Pin
Team Phoenix	8:28

== Reigns ==
Key
No.	Overall reign number
Reign	Reign number for the specific team—reign numbers for the individuals are in parentheses, if different
Days	Number of days held
Defenses	Number of successful defenses
+	Current reign is changing daily

No.	Champion	Championship change			Reign statistics			Notes	Ref.
No.	Champion	Date	Event	Location	Reign	Days	Defenses	Notes	Ref.
1	Team Phoenix (Dynasty and Hikari Minami)	September 9, 2011	—	Warabi, Japan	1	562	2	Defeated Team Yankee Ribbon (Yuko Miyamoto and Chii Tomiya) in the final of a 4-team tournament on July 18, 2011, to become the inaugural champions. They were awarded the title on September 9.	
—	Vacated	March 24, 2013	—	—	—	—	—	Title vacated due to a lack of defenses.	
2	Yuko Miyamoto and Risa Sera	March 24, 2013	Young Ribbon Wasshoi!! vol. 18	Warabi, Japan	1	4,385+	0	Defeated Taro Yamada and Tsukushi to win the vacant title.	

== See also ==
- Professional wrestling in Japan
