= Dramatic Infinity 2025 =

2025 DDT Pro-Wrestling event

- Promotional poster featuring Kazuki Hirata and Yoshihiko
- Promotion: CyberFight
- Brand: DDT
- Date: September 28, 2025
- City: Tokyo, Japan
- Venue: Korakuen Hall

Pay-per-view chronology
← Previous; Wrestle Peter Pan 2025	Next → Ultimate Party 2025

Dramatic Infinity chronology
← Previous; 2024	Next → —

Dramatic Infinity 2025: 3-Hour Special was a professional wrestling event promoted by CyberFight's sub-brand DDT Pro-Wrestling (DDT). It took place on September 28, 2025, in Tokyo, Japan, at the Korakuen Hall. The event aired on CyberFight's streaming service Wrestle Universe.

The event featured three KO-D Openweight Championship defenses. First, Kazuki Hirata successfully defended the title against Yoshihiko in the scheduled main event. Then, Yuki Ueno cashed in his Right to Challenge Anytime Anywhere contract to claim the title. Finally, Kazuma Sumi cashed in his own contract, which he had won in an earlier bout. However, he failed in his attempt. Other prominent matches saw Minoru Suzuki successfully defend his DDT Universal Championship against Takeshi Masada, and the team of The 37Kamiina (Yuki Ueno and To-y) and Kaisei Takechi win the vacant KO-D 6-Man Tag Team Championship against Damnation T.A. (Hideki Okatani, MJ Paul and Ilusion).

== Background ==
The event featured professional wrestling matches that resulted from scripted storylines, where wrestlers portrayed villains, heroes, or less distinguishable characters in the scripted events that built tension and culminated in a wrestling match or series of matches.

== Event ==
The event began with a pre-show tag team confrontation between Daichi Satoh and Hinata Kasai and Rukiya and Soma Takao. The latter team emerged victorious.

=== Preliminary matches ===
In the first main card bout, Shinya Aoki defeated Yuya Koroku in a singles match.

Next was a three-way tag team elimination match fought under "no touch rules" (i.e. lucha libre rules) between Akito and Kazuma Sumi, The Apex (Yuki Iino and Yukio Naya), and Strange Love Connection (Mao and Kanon). First, Mao pinned Naya with a Japanese Legroll Clutch Hold, eliminating The Apex and winning Naya's Right to Challenge Anytime Anywhere contract. Then, Sumi pinned Mao to win the bout and take the contract for himself.

In the next bout, Harimau (Kazusada Higuchi, Naomi Yoshimura and Yuki Ishida) defeated Chris Brookes, Antonio Honda and Diego in a six-man tag team match.

Next, Harashima and Jun Akiyama defeated Player Uno and Danshoku Dino in an eight-second tag team match, when Harashima pinned Dino with a jackknife hold. The bout was restarted but won again by Harashima and Akiyama.

In the fifth bout, Yuki Ueno and To-y teamed up with Kaisei Takechi to defeat Damnation T.A. (Hideki Okatani, MJ Paul and Ilusion) and win the vacant KO-D 6-Man Tag Team Championship.

Then, Minoru Suzuki defeated Takeshi Masada to secure his fifth consecutive defense of the DDT Universal Championship.

=== Main event ===
In the main event, Kazuki Hirata defended his KO-D Openweight Championship against Yoshihiko. Hirata defeated Yoshihiko with an Avalanche Rolling Powerbomb, securing his second consecutive title defense. Yuki Ueno then challenged Hirata, cashing in his Right to Challenge Anytime Anywhere contract. Ueno defeated Hirata by performing the WR for a pinfall victory. This win marked Ueno's third KO-D Openweight title victory and ended Hirata's reign at 28 days and two defenses. Kazumi Sumi then stepped forward as a challenger, having taken a contract from Mao earlier. Ueno successfully defended his new title by pinning Sumi after a WR.

== Results ==
No.	Results	Stipulations	Times
1^{P}	Rukiya and Soma Takao defeated Daichi Sato and Hinata Kasai by pinfall	Tag team match	4:47
2	Shinya Aoki defeated Yuya Koroku by pinfall	Singles match	8:04
3	Akito and Kazuma Sumi defeated The Apex (Yuki Iino and Yukio Naya) and Strange Love Connection (Mao and Kanon) (with Kimihiro) by pinfall	Survival three-way tag team no touch rules match	8:32
4	Harimau (Kazusada Higuchi, Naomi Yoshimura and Yuki Ishida) defeated Schadenfreude International (Chris Brookes and Antonio Honda) and Diego by pinfall	Six-man tag team match	11:20
5	Jun Akiyama and Harashima defeated Player Uno and Danshoku Dino by pinfall (Note: The match was restarted after it originally ended with Harashima pinning Dino in eight seconds.)	Tag team match	5:43
6	The 37Kamiina (Yuki Ueno and To-y) and Kaisei Takechi defeated Damnation T.A. (Hideki Okatani, MJ Paul and Ilusion) by pinfall	Six-man tag team match for the vacant KO-D 6-Man Tag Team Championship	18:47
7	Minoru Suzuki (c) defeated Takeshi Masada by pinfall	Singles match for the DDT Universal Championship	13:06
8	Kazuki Hirata (c) defeated Yoshihiko by pinfall	Singles match for the KO-D Openweight Championship	15:42
9	Yuki Ueno defeated Kazuki Hirata (c) by pinfall	Singles match for the KO-D Openweight Championship; This was Ueno's Right to Challenge Anytime Anywhere cash-in match.	6:47
10	Yuki Ueno (c) defeated Kazuma Sumi by pinfall	Singles match for the KO-D Openweight Championship; This was Sumi's Right to Challenge Anytime Anywhere cash-in match.	12:02
(c) / – the champion(s) heading into the match; P / – the match was broadcast on the pre-show
