= Ren Ayabe =

Japanese professional wrestler

Personal information
- Born: 13 February 1997 (age 29) Shiki, Saitama, Japan

Professional wrestling career
- Ring name: Ren Ayabe
- Billed height: 200 cm (6 ft 7 in)
- Billed weight: 110 kg (243 lb)
- Trained by: Taka Michinoku
- Debut: 2020

Ren Ayabe (綾部蓮, Ayabe Ren) is a Japanese professional wrestler currently signed to All Japan Pro Wrestling (AJPW). He is also makes appearances for Professional Wrestling Just Tap Out (JTO) and on the Japanese independent scene promotions.

== Professional wrestling career ==
=== Professional Wrestling Just Tap Out (2020–present) ===
Ayabe made his professional wrestling debut in Professional Wrestling Just Tap Out at JTO Yume on September 2, 2020, where he fell short to Kanon in singles competition. Ayabe is a former King of JTO Champion, title which he first won at a house show from April 9, 2023, by defeating Yasu Urano. He is also a former and inaugural JTO Openweight Champion, title which he won alongside the finals of the 2023 J1 League tournament by defeating Ryuya Takekura.

=== All Japan Pro Wrestling (2022–present) ===
Ayabe made his debut in All Japan Pro Wrestling on the second night of the AJPW New Year Wars 2022 from January 3, where he teamed up with Shuji Ishikawa and Takao Omori to defeat Saito Brothers (Jun and Rei Saito) and Yoshi Tatsu. On the third night of the AJPW Giant Series 2023 from September 8, he teamed up with Shuji Ishikawa to unsuccessfully challenge the Saito Brothers for Gleat's G-Infinity Championship.

Ayabe competed in various of the promotion's signature events. In the Ōdō Tournament, he made his first appearance at the 2022 edition where he fell short to Jake Lee in the first rounds. One year later at the 2023 edition, he fell short to Shuji Ishikawa in the same phase of the competition. Ayabe succeeded in winning the 2024 edition of the tournament by defeating Yuma Anzai in the first rounds, Davey Boy Smith Jr. in the second ones, Rei Saito in the semifinals and Ryuki Honda in the finals.

In the World's Strongest Tag Determination League, Ayabe made his first appearance at the 2023 edition of the event where he teamed up with Shuji Ishikawa and scored a total of six points after going against the teams of Katsuhiko Nakajima and Hokuto Omori, Hayato Tamura and Galeno del Mal, Suwama and Hideki Suzuki, Saito Brothers, Yuma Aoyagi and Kento Miyahara, Ryuki Honda and Yuma Anzai, Kuroshio Tokyo Japan and Seigo Tachibana, Yukio Sakaguchi and Hideki Okatani, and Cyrus and Ryan Davidson.

In the Champion Carnival, Ayabe made his first appearance at the 2023 edition in which he placed himself in the A Block where scored a total of four points against Kento Miyahara, Davey Boy Smith Jr., Yuma Aoyagi, Kuroshio Tokyo Japan, Cyrus, Shotaro Ashino and Hokuto Omori.

== Championships and accomplishments ==
- All Japan Pro Wrestling
  - World Tag Team Championship (1 time) – with Talos
  - Ōdō Tournament (2024)
  - World's Strongest Tag Determination League (2025) – with Talos
- National Wrestling Alliance
  - Crockett Cup (2026) – with Talos
- Professional Wrestling Just Tap Out
  - King of JTO Championship (1 time)
  - JTO Openweight Championship (1 time, inaugural)
  - J1 League (2023)
- Pro Wrestling Illustrated
  - Ranked No. 263 of the top 500 singles wrestlers in the PWI 500 of 2026
