= King of JTO Championship =

Professional wrestling championship

King of JTO
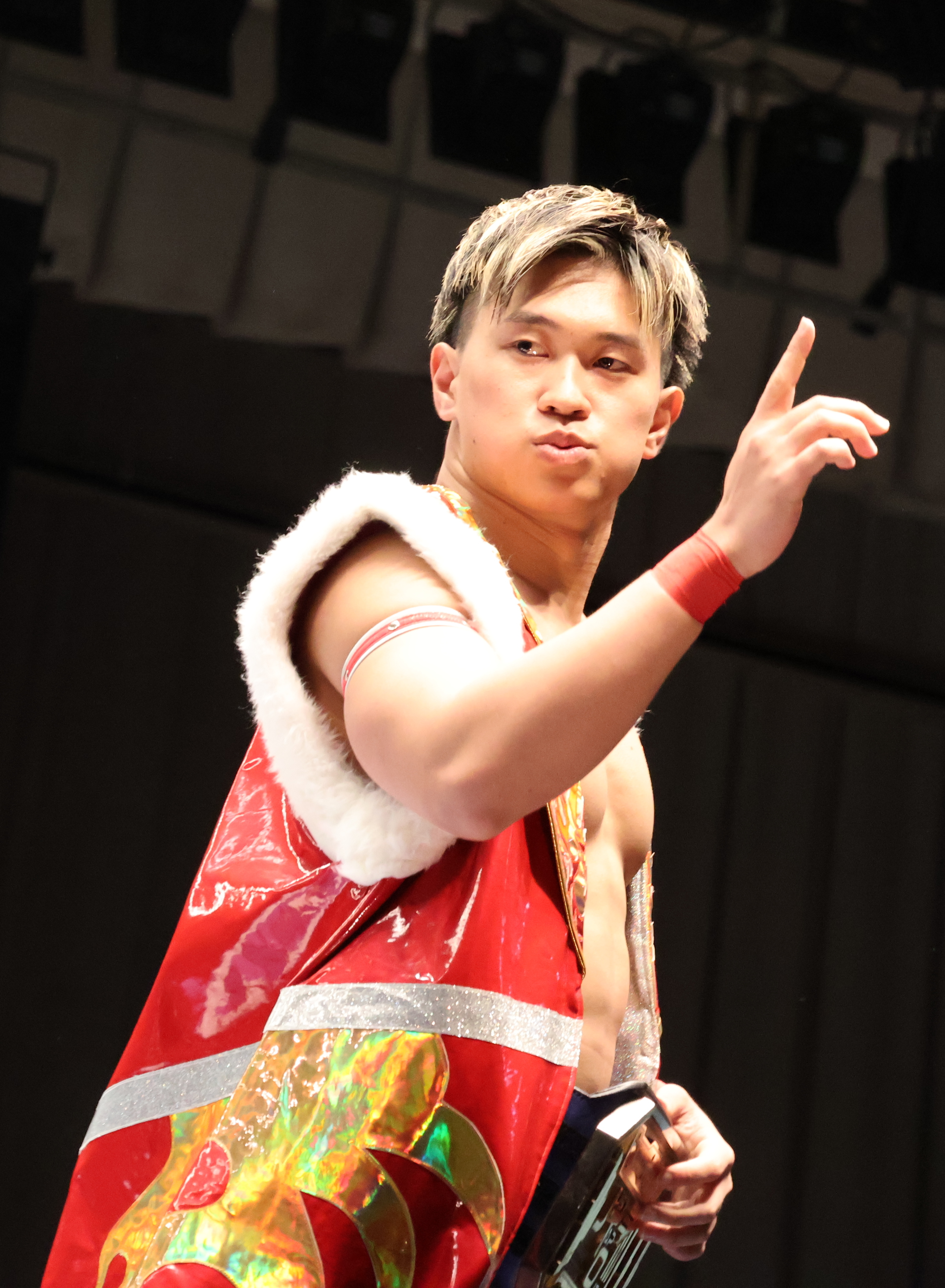
- Two-time champion Fire Katsumi wearing the title belt

Details
- Promotion: Professional Wrestling Just Tap Out
- Date established: March 6, 2026
- Current champion: Yukimitsu Takahashi
- Date won: August 11, 2026
Statistics
- First champion: Taka Michinoku
- Most reigns: Ryuya Takekura (4 reigns)
- Longest reign: Taka Michinoku (328 days)
- Shortest reign: Keita (41 days)
- Oldest champion: Taka Michinoku (46 years, 356 days)
- Youngest champion: Thunder Masami (20 years, 6 days)
- Heaviest champion: Ryuya Takekura (253 lbs)
- Lightest champion: Yukimitsu Takahashi (154 lbs)

King of JTO Championship is a professional wrestling championship owned by the Professional Wrestling Just Tap Out (JTO) promotion serving as the top accomplishment of JTO's male division. There have been a total of thirteen reigns shared between ten different champions and three vacancies. The current title holder is Yukimitsu Takahashi who is in his first reign.

== Title history ==
At the time of Professional Wrestling Just Tap Out establishment in 2020, a championship belt was not immediately produced, but instead, a ranking system was launched, later activating under the name of the male division "JTO Ranking" based on JTO rules that differed from other organizations. On August 14, 2020, Taka Michinoku won the inaugural "JTO Tournament" held at the Professional Wrestling Just Tap Out Shinkiba 1st Ring event by defeating Arata in the finals, thus becoming the first champion.

In 2022, a championship belt was produced with the cooperation of voters. On October 2, 2022, JTO launched a second-string ranking system, the J2 Ranking, due to the increase in the number of affiliated players, supplying opportunities for the promotion's championships.

== Reigns ==
Key
No.	Overall reign number
Reign	Reign number for the specific champion
Days	Number of days held
Defenses	Number of successful defenses
<1	Reign lasted less than a day
+	Current reign is changing daily

No.	Champion	Championship change			Reign statistics			Notes	Ref.
No.	Champion	Date	Event	Location	Reign	Days	Defenses	Notes	Ref.
1	Taka Michinoku	October 16, 2020	JTO House	Tokyo, Japan	1	328	5	Defeated Arata to become the inaugural champion.	
2	Ryuya Takekura	September 9, 2021	JTO Yume	Tokyo, Japan	1	70	2		
3	Kanon	November 18, 2021	JTO Itadaki	Tokyo, Japan	1	106	2		
—	Vacated	March 4, 2022	—	—	—	—	—		
4	Ryuya Takekura	March 4, 2022	JTO Tournament 2022	Tokyo, Japan	2	245	1	Defeated Ren Ayabe in the finals of the 2022 King of JTO Tournament.	
5	Yasu Urano	November 4, 2022	JTO Ran	Tokyo, Japan	1	156	1		
6	Ren Ayabe	April 9, 2023	JTO	Tokyo, Japan	1	99	1		
7	Ryuya Takekura	July 17, 2023	JTO 4th Anniversary	Tokyo, Japan	3	228	2		
8	Fire Katsumi	March 1, 2024	JTO	Tokyo, Japan	1	245	4		
9	Keita	November 1, 2024	JTO	Tokyo, Japan	1	41	0		
—	Vacated	December 12, 2024	—	—	—	—	—		
10	Fire Katsumi	December 15, 2024	JTO West Japan Series 2024	Takamatsu, Japan	2	208	2	Defeated Genta Yubari to win the vacant title.	
11	Thunder Masami	July 11, 2025	JTO 6th Anniversary	Tokyo, Japan	1	170	1		
11	Ryuya Takekura	December 28, 2025	JTO Final Show Of The Year	Tokyo, Japan	4	68	1		
12	Ibuki	March 6, 2026	JTO	Tokyo, Japan	1	112	1		
—	Vacated	June 26, 2026	—	—	—	—	—		
13	Yukimitsu Takahashi	August 11, 2026	JTO Special	Saitama, Japan	1	102+	2	Defeated Ryuya Takekura to win the vacant title.	

== Combined reigns ==
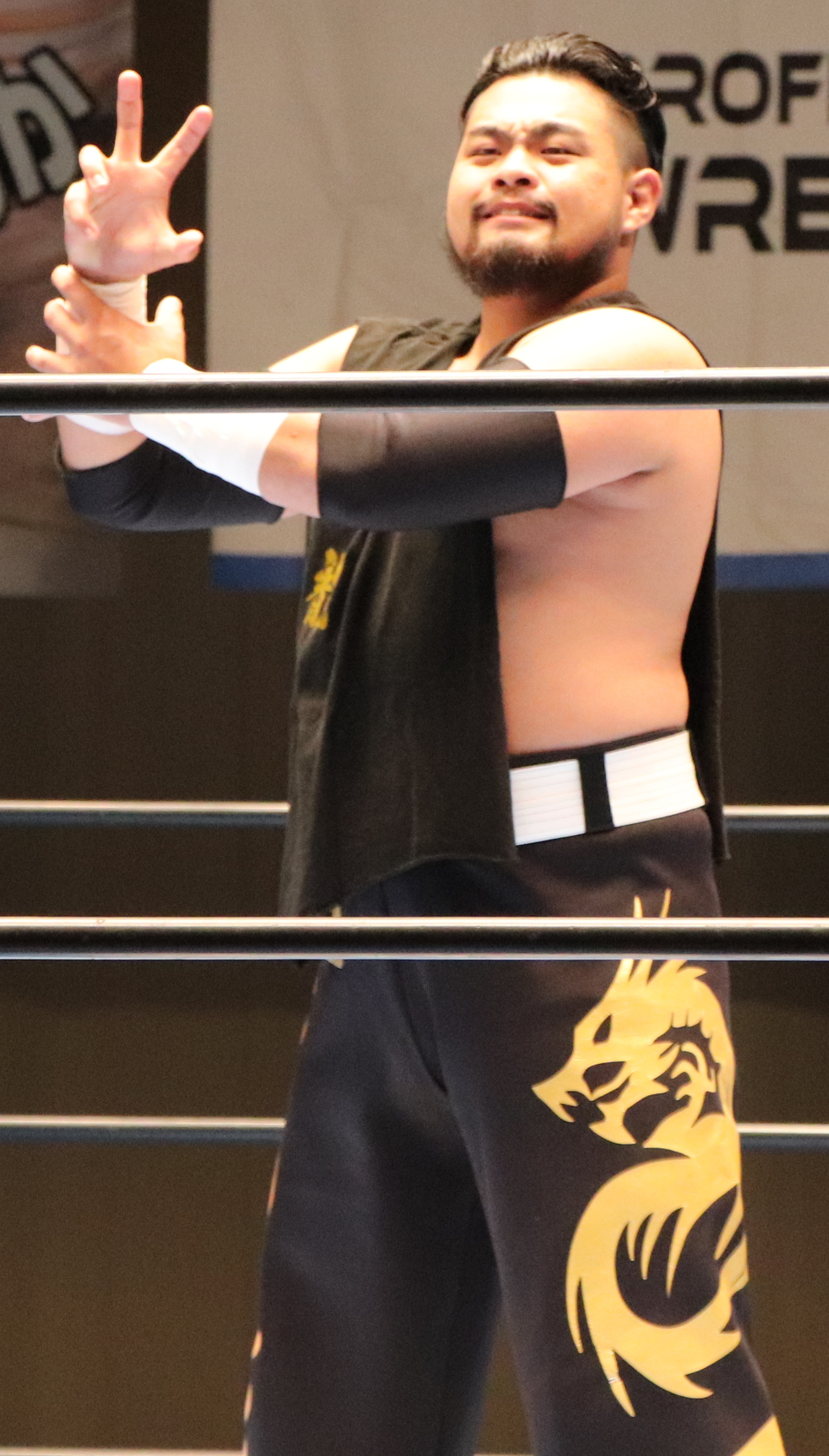
Record four-time champion Ryuya Takekura.

As of November 21, 2026.

†	Indicates the current champion

Rank	Wrestler	No. of reigns	Combined defenses	Combined days
1	Ryuya Takekura	4	6	611
2	Fire Katsumi	2	6	453
3	Taka Michinoku	1	5	328
4	Thunder Masami	1	1	170
5	Yasu Urano	1	1	156
6	Ibuki	1	1	112
7	Kanon	1	2	106
8	Yukimitsu Takahashi †	1	2	102+
9	Ren Ayabe	1	1	99
10	Keita	1	0	41
