= WMF Junior Heavyweight Championship =

Details
- Promotion: Wrestling Marvelous Future
- Date established: July 25, 2003
- Date retired: July 31, 2005
Statistics
- First champion: Tomoya Adachi
- Most reigns: Tomoya Adachi, Hi69, Gentaro, Onryo and Goemon (1 reign)
- Longest reign: Onryo (415 days)
- Shortest reign: Hi69 (<1 day)

WMF Junior Heavyweight Championship was a junior heavyweight title in the Japanese independent promotion Wrestling Marvelous Future (WMF). It was the primary championship in WMF and the only title defended in the promotion throughout its history. The inaugural champion was determined via a single elimination tournament in 2003. The title was disbanded in 2005 after the promotion suffered financial loss.

== Inaugural tournament ==
Quarterfinals
Asian Cougar	DQ
Sasuke the Great	10:55
Soldier	Pin
Minoru Fujita	8:45
Tomoya Adachi	Pin
Flying Kid Ichihara	13:25
GOEMON	Pin
Ideka-kun	18:08

Semifinals
Asian Cougar	Pin
Soldier	11:35
Tomoya Adachi	Pin
Ideka-kun	11:51

Final
Asian Cougar	Pin
Tomoya Adachi	16:16

== Title history ==
#	Wrestler	Reign	Date	Days held	Location	Event	Notes
1	Tomoya Adachi	1	July 25, 2003	161	Tokyo, Japan	Marvelous Days 3rd	Adachi defeated Asian Cougar in a tournament final to become the inaugural champion. The title change aired on August 3 via tape delay.
2	Hi69	1	February 1, 2004	<1	Chiba, Japan	Kaientai Dojo's Yoshidaya Kogyo	
3	Gentaro	1	February 1, 2004	10	Chiba, Japan	Kaientai Dojo's Yoshidaya Kogyo	
4	Onryo	1	February 11, 2004	415	Tokyo, Japan	Marvelous Days 8th	The title change aired on February 23 via tape delay.
5	Goemon	1	April 1, 2005	121	Tokyo, Japan	IWC vs. WMF Confrontation Super Hardcore Night	This was a hardcore match.
—	Retired	—	July 31, 2005	—	—	—	The title was abandoned due to financial losses for WMF.
