= Kaisei Takechi =

Japanese singer, dancer and actor (born 1997)

- 武知 海青
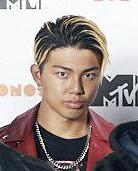
- Takechi with The Rampage at the VMAJ 2017 Awards.
- Born: 4 February 1998 (age 28); Takarazuka, Hyōgo Prefecture, Japan
- Occupations: Singer; rapper; dancer; actor; professional wrestler
- Years active: 2014–present
- Agent: LDH
- Musical career
- Genres: J-pop; Dance
- Labels: Rhythm Zone; MoooD Records
- Professional wrestling career
- Ring name: Kaisei Takechi
- Billed height: 183 cm (6 ft 0 in)
- Billed weight: 78 kg (172 lb)
- Trained by: DDT Pro-Wrestling Dojo
- Debut: 2024
- Website: www.ldh.co.jp

Kaisei Takechi (武知 海青, Takechi Kaisei; born 4 February 1998) is a Japanese singer, dancer, actor and professional wrestler. He is a member of the J-Pop group The Rampage from Exile Tribe represented with LDH. In professional wrestling, he is signed to DDT Pro-Wrestling, where he is a former KO-D 6-Man Tag Team Champion.

== Early life ==
Takechi was born in Takarazuka, Hyōgo Prefecture and has two older sisters. In the fifth grade, he competed in the butterfly stroke events at the JOC Junior Olympic Cup. His mother ran a dancing school and he began dancing at the age of two. During elementary and junior high school, Takechi has a senior-junior relationship with Hiroshima Toyo Carp baseball player Kaito Kozono.

== Music career ==
In April 2014, he was eliminated in the final round of the Exile Performer Battle Audition, but was selected as a candidate member of THE RAMPAGE. On September 12 of the same year, he became an official member of the group.

On November 16, 2019, he won the overall title in the Stylish Guy category of the "Summer Style Award 2019 ROOKIE CHALLENGE CUP," a body contest to determine the man or woman who looks best in summer. He won the TBS program "Strongest Athletes Summit Battle 2022" on March 22, 2022. He is the second LDH member to win the tournament, following Mandy Sekiguchi. In April 2022, the video streaming service “CL” aired a segment that closely followed Takechi, who had no prior judo experience, for a year until he obtained his black belt.

He is one of the members of a Krump dance crew "Rag Pound" with fellow members Kazuma Kawamura and Makoto Hasegawa.

== Professional wrestling career ==
=== DDT Pro-Wrestling (2024–present) ===
Takechi played the role of a professional wrestler in the drama Masked D, which began airing in October 2022. He received a contract offer from president of DDT Pro-Wrestling Sanshiro Takagi, professional wrestling organization that cooperated with the filming.

Takechi made his in-ring debut at Into The Fight 2024 on February 25, where he teamed up with The37Kamiina (Shunma Katsumata and Yuki Ueno) to defeat Hideki Okatani, Takeshi Masada and Tetsuya Endo in six-man tag team competition. At Dramatic Infinity 2024 on September 29, he teamed up with Mao and Yuki Ueno to defeat Schadenfreude International (Chris Brookes, Masahiro Takanashi and Takeshi Masada). After a nearly one-year hiatus from professional wrestling, Takechi made his return at Dramatic Infinity 2025 on September 28, where he teamed up with To-y and Yuki Ueno and defeated Damnation T.A. (MJ Paul, Hideki Okatani and Ilusion) to win the vacant KO-D 6-Man Tag Team Championship. At Ultimate Party 2025 on November 3, he teamed up with Konosuke Takeshita to defeat Kazusada Higuchi and Takeshi Masada.

=== New Japan Pro-Wrestling (2025–present) ===
He made his debut in a New Japan Pro Wrestling show at Purge Night of Torture on November 19, 2025, where he teamed up with Akito and Yuki Ueno in a losing effort against House of Torture (Douki, Sanada and Sho). Takechi wrestled at Wrestle Kingdom 20 where he competed in a six-man tag team Ranbo for the NEVER Openweight 6-Man Tag Team Championship against defending champions Toru Yano and Spiritech (Master Wato and Yoh) alongside Shota Umino and Yuya Uemura, in a losing effort.

== Works ==
=== Music videos ===
Year	Title	Artist	Notes	ref.
2017	100 Degrees	The Rampage	Dancing	
2022	Tsutsumikomu Yō ni...	iScream & The Rampage	Dancing	
2025	Summer Vacation	Generation & The Rampage	Dancing	

== Filmography ==
=== Streaming programs ===
Year	Title	Role	Broadcast	ref.
2021	Fighting Dreamers Season 1	Navigator and supporter	Abema	
2022	Fighting Dreamers Season 2	Fighting supporter	Abema	
2022	Love Coach is My Ex-Lover	Studio MC	Abema	
2022	Masked D	Haou	Abema	

=== TV Drama ===
Year	Title	Role	Broadcast	ref.
2022	Takahashi from the Bike Shop (Final episode)	Aoki Hayato	TV Tokyo	
2024	Red Blue	Nueji Ganmaru	MBS/TBS	

=== Stage ===
Year	Title	Role	ref.
2022	Real RPG Stage "Eternal 2" - Justice Burning in the Wilderness	Connie	
2023	PICK☆3	Atsumu Takeda	
2024	Book Act Final "I want to dance with you again"		

== Championships and accomplishments ==
- DDT Pro-Wrestling
  - KO-D 6-Man Tag Team Championship (1 time) – with To-y and Yuki Ueno
- Tokyo Sports
  - Newcomer Award (2025)
