= Onryo (wrestler) =

Japanese professional wrestler

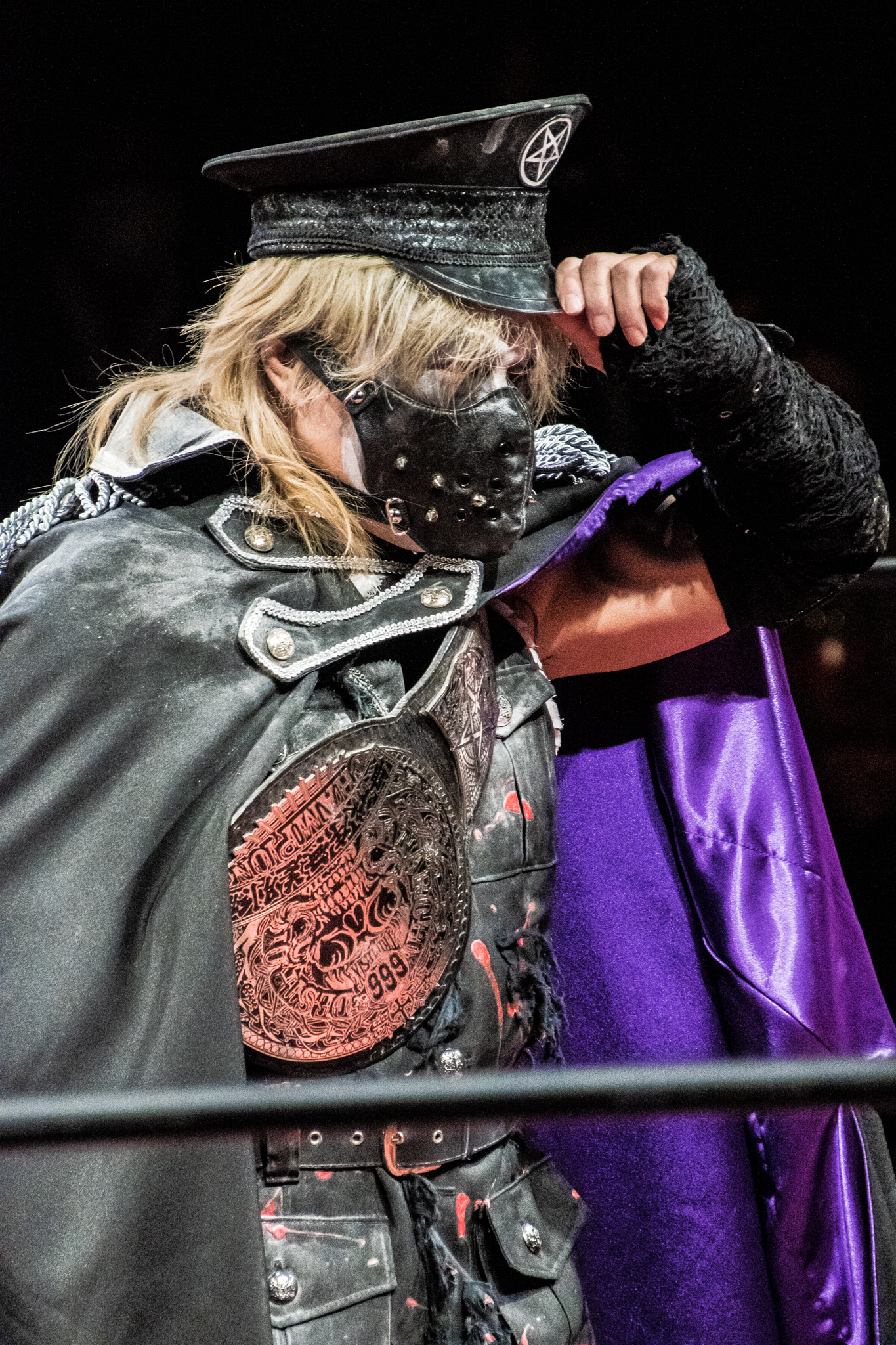
- Onryo in March 2021

Personal information
- Born: May 27, 1971 (age 55) Ota, Gunma, Japan

Professional wrestling career
- Ring names: Calgary Wolf; Onryo; Wolf Ozawa
- Billed height: 173 cm (5 ft 8 in)
- Billed weight: 89 kg (196 lb)
- Trained by: Wrestle Dream Factory
- Debut: March 31, 1995

Ryo Matsuri (祭 遼, Matsuri Ryō; born May 27, 1971), known by the ring name Onryo (怨霊, Onryō) (sometimes stylized in romaji as ONRYO), is a Japanese professional wrestler and promoter. Matsuri, as Onryo, portrays a ghost wrestler who was killed after winning a cursed championship. He is known for his work in Frontier Martial-Arts Wrestling and Big Japan Pro Wrestling and is the founder of the Wrestling of Darkness 666 (666) promotion, who he co-owned with Qp-Crazy frontman Yasuhiro "Crazy SKB" Sakano until 2018.

== Professional wrestling career ==
Onryo started his career as Wolf Ozawa in the Tokai University backyard wrestling promotion, where he was eventually discovered by Men's Teioh and invited to train in the Wrestle Yume Factory. There he adopted the gimmick of Onryo, an undead wrestler based on the Japanese folklore ghosts of the same name. Under this character, Onryo wore pale facepaint and shabby clothes that released ashes with each movement, and elements of his gimmick included the ability to turn invisible to his opponents and disappear at will.

Onryo gained popularity and began appearing in promotions like Pro Wrestling Fujiwara Gumi, Wrestle Association R and Dramatic Dream Team before eventually signing with Frontier Martial Arts Wrestling (FMW) in 2000. He also participated in that year's Super J-Cup, eliminating Curry Man before being eliminated himself by Cima. His FMW tenure would be the most prolific one, however. He participated in a feud with Goemon about a cursed championship that slowly killed his champion, which was revealed as the reason why Onryo became a ghost in the past.

In 2003, Onryo founded Wrestling of Darkness 666, also known as simply 666 (Triple Six), along with The Crazy SKB. Along with his participations in 666, he found his niche in Big Japan Pro Wrestling teaming with (and occasionally facing) Men's Teioh in cruiserweight matches.

== Championships and accomplishments ==
- 666
  - 666 Disorder Openweight Championship (2 time, current)
- Frontier Martial-Arts Wrestling
  - WEW Tag Team Championship (1 time) – with Goemon
  - WEW Hardcore Tag Team Championship (1 time) – with Goemon
- Kaientai Dojo
  - UWA World Middleweight Championship (1 time)
- Wrestling Marvelous Future
  - WMF Junior Heavyweight Championship (1 time)
  - WEW Tag Team Championship (1 time) – with Tetsuhiro Kuroda
