= 666 Disorder Openweight Championship =

Professional wrestling championship

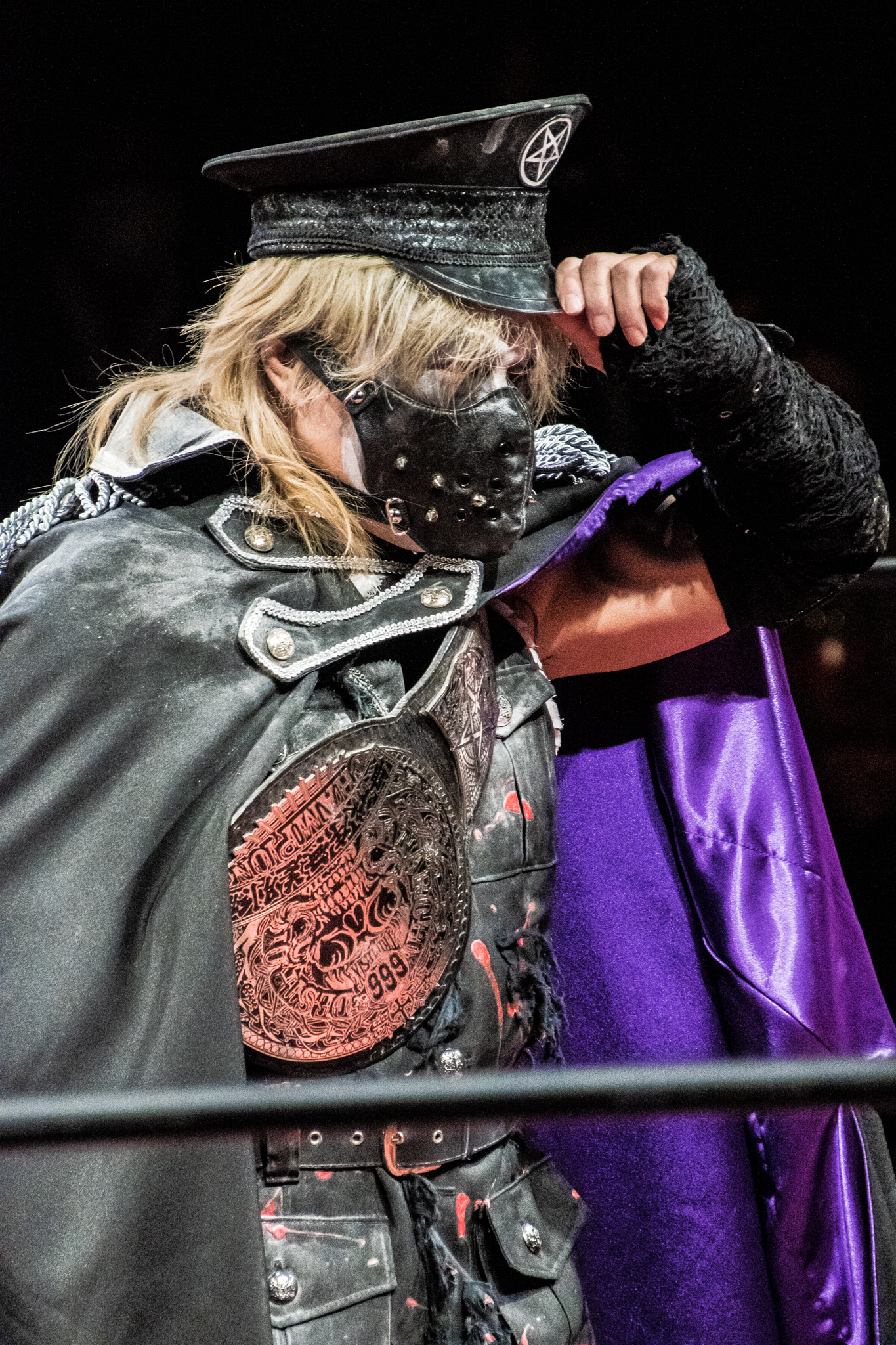
- Onryo with the current belt design in March 2021

Details
- Promotion: 666
- Date established: 2018
- Current champion: Maika Ozaki
- Date won: May 8, 2026
Statistics
- First champion: Yuko Miyamoto
- Most reigns: Yuko Miyamoto and Onryo (2 reigns)
- Longest reign: Konaka=Pahalwhan (569 days)
- Shortest reign: Yuko Miyamoto (63 days)
- Oldest champion: Onryo (54 years, 10 days)
- Youngest champion: Koju Takeda (32 years, 86 days)
- Heaviest champion: Yuko Miyamoto (90 kg (200 lb))
- Lightest champion: Onryo (0 kg (0 lb)) (Note: In storyline, Onryo is a yōkai that is billed as weighing 0 kg.)

The 666 Disorder Openweight Championship (Japanese: 666認定無秩序無差別級王座, Hepburn: Toripuru Shikkusu-nintei Muchitsujo Musabetsu-kyū Ōza) is a professional wrestling championship established in 2018 as the top singles accomplishment in the Japanese promotion Wrestling of Darkness 666 (Triple Six).

The title is currently held by Maika Ozaki who is in her first reign.

== History ==
On December 23, 2018, Yuko Miyamoto defeated Onryo in the final of a 16-person tournament to win the inaugural title.

In October 2023, Koju Takeda vacated the title after suffering an injury and having been diagnosed with a cervical hernia. A tournament was then held in early 2024 to determine a new champion.

=== Inaugural tournament ===
The tournament to crown the inaugural 666 Disorder Openweight Champion started on February 23, 2018, at 666 vol. 81. A "first round" 26-person battle royal was held with the last 15 survivors advancing to the second round alongside Mame Endo who received an automatic bye.

Round 2 February 23, April 28, June 6
Yuko Miyamoto	Pin
Naoshi Sano	7:46
K666	9:13
Kouzy	Pin
Koju Takeda	Pin
Masked Badi II	12:39
Mame Endo	13:06
Hiroaki Taniguchi	Sub
Onryo	Pin
Hercules Senga	7:43
Ram Kaicho
Taro Yamada	Forfeit
Konaka=Pahalwhan	Pin
Takonyūtō	12:00
Shinobu	Sub
Nene Mugen D.a.i	9:58

Quarterfinals; August 17, October 27
Yuko Miyamoto	Pin
Kouzy	1:36
Koju Takeda	Pin
Hiroaki Taniguchi	9:12
Onryo	Pin
Taro Yamada	11:15
Konaka=Pahalwhan	Pin
Nene Mugen D.a.i (Note: Although Shinobu defeated Nene Mugen D.a.i in the first round, he offered Nene to advance in the tournament.)	5:53

Semifinals; December 23
Yuko Miyamoto	Pin
Koju Takeda	9:22
Onryo	Pin
Konaka=Pahalwhan	7:42

Final; December 23
Yuko Miyamoto	Pin
Onryo	12:35

== Reigns ==
As of October 13, 2026, there have been a total of nine reigns shared among seven different wrestlers, and one vacancy. The current champion is Maika Ozaki who is in her first reign.

Key
No.	Overall reign number
Reign	Reign number for the specific champion
Days	Number of days held
Defenses	Number of successful defenses
+	Current reign is changing daily

No.	Champion	Championship change			Reign statistics			Notes	Ref.
No.	Champion	Date	Event	Location	Reign	Days	Defenses	Notes	Ref.
1	Yuko Miyamoto	December 23, 2018	666 vol. 86: 16th Anniversary Show	Tokyo, Japan	1	552	4	Defeated Onryo in the final of a 16-person tournament to become the inaugural champion.	
2	Onryo	June 27, 2020	666 vol. 97: Onryo 25th Debut Anniversary	Tokyo, Japan	1	562	2		
3	Konaka=Pahalwhan	January 10, 2022	666 vol. 111	Tokyo, Japan	1	569	5		
4	Koju Takeda	August 2, 2023	666 vol. 131: 666 20th Anniversary & Yuko Miyamoto 20th Debut Anniversary	Tokyo, Japan	1	149	0		
—	Vacated	December 29, 2023	666 vol. 136	Tokyo, Japan	—	—	—	The title was vacated after Koju Takeda suffered a torn calf muscle and was diagnosed with a cervical hernia in October.	
5	Ikuto Hidaka	April 28, 2024	666 vol. 141	Tokyo, Japan	1	341	3	Defeated Yuko Miyamoto in a tournament final to win the vacant title.	
6	Yuko Miyamoto	April 4, 2025	666 vol. 150	Tokyo, Japan	2	63	0		
7	Onryo	June 6, 2025	666 vol. 152: Onryo's 30th Anniversary & Ram Kaichow's 20th Anniversary	Tokyo, Japan	2	245	2	This match was also for Onryo's 666 Locomotiveweight Championship.	
8	Kagura	February 6, 2026	666 vol. 158	Tokyo, Japan	1	91	0	This was a Winner Takes All three-way match also for Yanagawa's 666 Locomotiveweight Championship.	
9	Maika Ozaki	May 8, 2026	666 vol. 161	Tokyo, Japan	1	158+	1	First woman to hold the title.	

== Combined reigns ==
As of October 13, 2026.

†	Indicates the current champions

Rank	Wrestler	No. of reigns	Combined defenses	Combined days
1	Onryo	2	4	807
2	Yuko Miyamoto	2	4	615
3	Konaka=Pahalwhan	1	5	569
4	Ikuto Hidaka	1	3	341
5	Maika Ozaki †	1	1	158+
6	Koju Takeda	1	0	149
7	Kagura	1	0	91

== See also ==
- Professional wrestling in Japan
