= Qp-Crazy =

Japanese hardcore punk band

- Origin: Kanagawa, Japan
- Genres: Hardcore punk
- Years active: 1994-present
- Labels: Satsugai Ennka Vinyl
- Members: The Crazy SKB; Kura; Tuji-Q; Dandy Muu; Ogeretsudouji
- Past members: Proletar

Qp-Crazy is a Japanese hardcore punk band. The band was started by Crazy Skb in 1994. They usually perform in Japan, but they released their 9th Album タンク山の動物園(Tank Mountain Zoo) in the United States.

== Members ==
- Vocal:The Crazy SKB (Kyouaku Kyoujin Dan→Moudoku→Hightechnology Suicide→Qp-Crazy)
- Guitar:Kura
- Bass:Tuji-Q (The Stalin→Qp-Crazy)
- Drums:Dandy Muu
- DJ: 汚喧烈童子(Ogeretsudouji)

Past Members

- Sampler:Proletar

== Discography ==
- 1st Album「トワイライトゾンビ（死霊の盆踊り）」"Twilight Zombie (Ghost Bonodori)"
- 2nd Album「顔面土砂崩れ」"Landslide Face"
- 3rd Album「バイオレンス・ホモ」"Violence Homo"
- 4th Album「DEATHPORN21ANIMAL」
- 5th Album「棺桶に片足を突っ込んでいるおまえの姿が見える」"I can see you are thrust your feet into the coffin"
- 6th Album「悪魔の毒々新録ワースト」"Devil of New Recording gaudy worst Album"(New Recording Best Album)
- 7th Album「キューピークレイジーの地獄逝きだョ！出発進行！」(Qp-Crazy's "this is going to Hell! Let's Go!!")
- 8th Album「夜霧の挑発ジュラシック」
- 9th Album「タンク山の動物園」"Tank Mountain Zoo" (This Album sell in United States)
- 10th Album「平成暗イ死ス」(Heisei Period Crisis) Maybe Release in United States.
