= Yuko Miyamoto =

Japanese professional wrestler (born 1982)

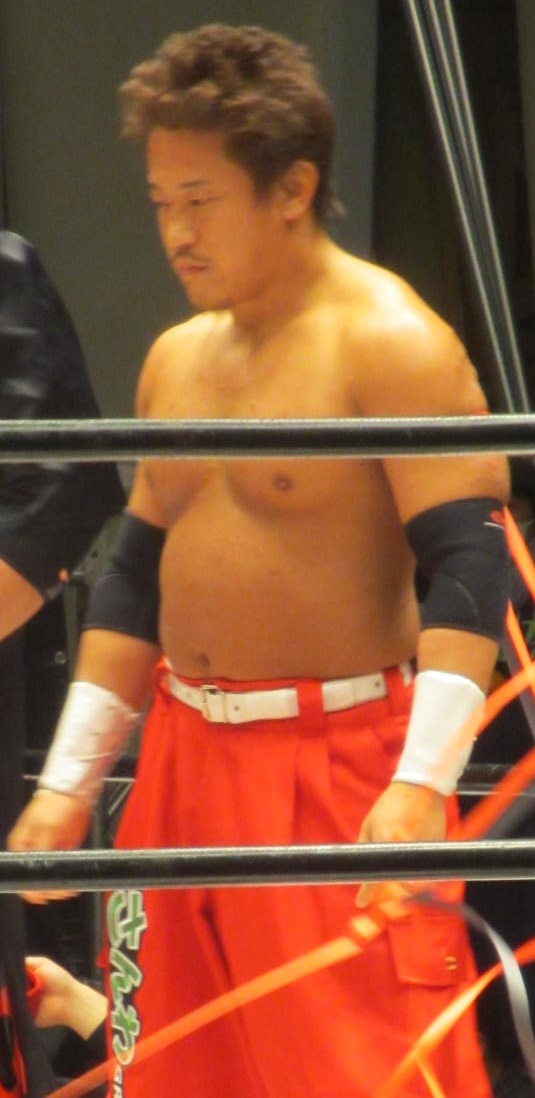
- Miyamoto in December 2015

Personal information
- Born: May 25, 1982 (age 44) Yoshiwa, Hiroshima, Japan

Professional wrestling career
- Ring name(s): Puroresu Mania Mask; Yuko Miyamoto
- Billed height: 1.75 m (5 ft 9 in)
- Billed weight: 90 kg (198 lb)
- Trained by: Mr. Gannosuke; Mammoth Sasaki
- Debut: August 2, 2003

Yuko Miyamoto (宮本 裕向, Miyamoto Yūkō; born May 25, 1982) is a Japanese professional wrestler. He originally started his career in Wrestling Marvelous Future in August 2003, but later left the promotion and in 2004, signed with Wrestling of Darkness 666 (Triple Six). Miyamoto has since appeared in Big Japan Pro Wrestling (BJW), DDT Pro-Wrestling (DDT) and All Japan Pro Wrestling (AJPW).

Miyamoto is a former one-time DDT Extreme Champion, two-time BJW Deathmatch Heavyweight and a two-time Dove Pro Heavyweight Champion and a one-time CZW Ultraviolent Underground Champion. He is also known as one half of the tag team Yankee Nichokenju (ヤンキー二丁拳銃, Yankī Nichōkenjū; "Yankee Pistols Akimbo") with Isami Kodaka, where they are one-time KO-D Tag Team Champions, three-time BJW Tag Team Champions, one-time Wave Tag Team Champions, two-time All Asia Tag Team Champions and have also won the Dai Nihon Saikyo Tag League three times. In 2016, Miyamto formed a tag team with Harashima, named Smile Yankees (スマイル・ヤンキース, Sumairu yankīsu), where they were one-time KO-D Tag Team Champions.

== Early life ==
After entering high school, Yuko Miyamoto joined a bōsōzoku motorcycle gang and within six months became the "suicide squad leader" of a 100-member group. In November 1999, during his sophomore year in high school, he was at the forefront of 50 bōsōzoku groups in the "1999 Ebisu-ko Violence Incident", which was widely covered by the mass media nationwide, and was arrested and detained by the riot police. When he saw his mother crying at the police station where she went to pick up her son, he decided to retire from the motorcycle gang and was expelled from high school. He then worked as a steeplejack.

== Professional wrestling career ==
=== Wrestling Marvelous Future (2003–2004) ===
Miyamoto would find himself as a trainee in WMF (Wrestling Marvelous Future) as he would spare with Mammoth Sasaki. His debut would come on August 2, 2003 against Mineo Fujita in Tokushima, Japan. He would then become aligned with the Wrestling of Darkness 666 promotion, run by The Crazy SKB.

=== Big Japan Pro Wrestling (2004–present) ===
Miyamoto would go on to compete in Big Japan Pro Wrestling (BJW) in which he would begin working in the death match style in 2006, after BJW ran a recruitment for wrestlers to compete in deathmatches. Miyamoto would then go on to win his first ever death match in his career. In the deathmatch circles, Yuko found himself a generational rival in Isami Kodaka.

In 2007 Miyamoto would begin teaming with Takashi Sasaki as the two would remain as a team, off and on, throughout the years to come, they even got close to winning the BJW Saikyo Tag League and becoming the new BJW Tag Team Champions.

On May 4, 2008 Miyamoto defeated the veteran Shadow WX to win the BJW Deathmatch Heavyweight Championship. Miyamoto would go on to compete in the United States in 2009 and even go on to capture the CZW Ultraviolent Championship from Nick Gage. Miyamoto would go on to make five successful defenses with the belt defeating Masashi Takeda, Abdullah Kobayashi, Mad Man Pondo, Takashi Sasaki and Isami Kodaka before losing it to Ryuji Ito on May 4, 2010.

In 2010, Miyamoto formed a new tag team named "Deathmatch Nichokenju", later renamed "Yankee Nichokenju", with longtime rival Isami Kodaka.

On May 5, 2011 Yankee Nichokenju won their first title together, when they defeated Jaki Numazawa and Jun Kasai for the BJW Tag Team Championship.

On March 29, 2012, Miyamoto defeated his partner Isami Kodaka to win the DDT Extreme Championship as part of an interpromotional rivalry between Union Pro and BJW. On April 1, Kodaka and Miyamoto also lost the BJW Tag Team Championship to Shinobu and Yoshihito Sasaki. On July 18 Miyamoto lost the DDT Extreme Championship to Shuji Ishikawa in a BJW and Union Pro co-event. The two bounced back on November 22 by winning the 2012 Dai Nihon Saikyo Tag League and becoming the new BJW Tag Team Champions.

On May 5, 2014, Yankee Nichokenju faced off in a 300 fluorescent light tube TLC deathmatch for the BJW Deathmatch Heavyweight Championship. Kodaka won the match, making his fourth successful title defense. On May 31 Yankee Nichokenju lost the BJW Tag Team Championship to Twin Towers (Kohei Sato and Shuji Ishikawa), ending their eighteen-month reign at seventeen successful title defenses. On June 15 Miyamoto would recapture the BJW Deathmatch Heavyweight Championship defeating Ryuji Ito. On November 21, Yankee Nichokenju defeated Abdullah Kobayashi and Ryuji Ito in the finals to win their third Dai Nihon Saikyo Tag League in a row. On December 31, Yankee Nichokenju took part in Toshikoshi Puroresu, an annual new year's collaboration event between BJW, DDT and Kaientai Dojo, winning the Tenka Toitsu! tournament, held for the first time in a tag team format.

After five successful title defenses Miyamoto lost the BJW Deathmatch Heavyweight Championship to Abdullah Kobayashi on May 5, 2015.

=== DDT Pro-Wrestling (2013–present) ===
On August 18, 2013 at Ryōgoku Peter Pan 2013, DDT's biggest event of the year, Miyamoto and Kodaka defeated Hikaru Sato and Yukio Sakaguchi to win the KO-D Tag Team Championship for the first time and become double tag team champions. Following their win, Miyamoto and Kodaka vowed to successfully defend their double crown hundred times. Yankee Nichokenju went undefeated for most of 2013, before losing to Speed of Sounds (Hercules Senga and Tsutomu Oosugi) in a non-title match on October 18. Miyamoto dominated independent wrestling awards ceremony, winning the Best Unit Award with Isami Kodaka.

Yankee Nichokenju's reign as double tag team champions came to an end on January 26, 2014, when they lost the KO-D Tag Team Championship to the Golden☆Lovers (Kenny Omega and Kota Ibushi) in a three-way match, also involving the team of Konosuke Takeshita and Tetsuya Endo.

On June 12, 2016, during a DDT event Miyamoto pinned Danshoku Dino, claiming Dino's Right To Challenge Anytime Anywhere contract. After the match he declared that he wanted to challenge Konosuke Takeshita for the KO-D Openweight Championship. On July 3, Miyamoto unsuccessfully challenged Takeshita for the KO-D Openweight Champion. Later Miyamoto would join the stable Smile Squash in DDT and form a team with Harashima named Smile Yankees. On August 28 at Ryōgoku Peter Pan 2016, Smile Yankees defeated KAI and Ken Ohka to win the KO-D Tag Team Championship. On September 25, Smile Yankees defeated Daisuke Sasaki and Tetsuya Endo to make their first successful title defense of the KO-D Tag Team Championship. On October 9, Miyamoto and Harashima lost the KO-D Tag Team Championship in the second title defense to Sasaki and Endo in a rematch.

=== All Japan Pro Wrestling (2015–present) ===
In October 2015, Yankee Nichokenju took part in All Japan Pro Wrestling (AJPW)'s Jr. Tag Battle of Glory, where they finished second with a record of two wins, one draw and one loss, suffered against Atsushi Aoki and Hikaru Sato in their last round-robin match, the de facto final of the tournament. On November 15, Kodaka and Miyamoto defeated Kotaro Suzuki and Yohei Nakajima in a decision match to win the vacant All Asia Tag Team Championship. During Miyamoto and Kodaka's title defenses of the All Asia Tag Team Champions Yankee Nichokenju joined the Axe Bombers stable. After six successful title defenses, Miyamoto and Kodaka lost the All Asia Tag Team Championship to Atsushi Aoki and Hikaru Sato on July 24 at a BJW event.

=== Other appearances ===
On July 27, Yankee Nichokenju won women's wrestling promotion Pro Wrestling Wave (Wave)'s Tag Team Championship by defeating Las Aventureras (Ayako Hamada and Yuu Yamagata). On August 24, Yankee Nichokenju lost the Wave Tag Team Championship to Sakuragohan (Kyusei Sakura Hirota and Mika Iida) in a three-way match, which also included Las Aventureras. On October 2, Kodaka made an appearance for Pro Wrestling Noah, teaming with Yuko Miyamoto and Daisuke Sekimoto in a six-man tag team main event, where they defeated Atsushi Kotoge, Hitoshi Kumano and Naomichi Marufuji.

In July, Miyamoto made it to the finals of Pro Wrestling Zero1 (Zero1)'s 2015 Tenkaichi Jr. tournament, but was defeated there by Takuya Sugawara. Also in Zero1, Yankee Nichokenju joined the stable Dangan Yankies.

== Championships and accomplishments ==
- 666
  - 666 Disorder Openweight Championship (1 time, inaugural)
  - 666 Locomotiveweight Championship (1 time) – with K666
- All Japan Pro Wrestling
  - All Asia Tag Team Championship (2 times) – with Isami Kodaka
  - Gaora TV Championship (1 time)
- Big Japan Pro Wrestling
  - BJW Deathmatch Heavyweight Championship (2 times)
  - Yokohama Shopping Street 6-Man Tag Team Championship (3 times) – with Abdullah Kobayashi and Jaki Numazawa, Jaki Numazawa and Ryuji Ito, and Ryuji Ito and Takashi Sasaki
  - BJW Tag Team Championship (3 times) – with Isami Kodaka
  - Saikyo Tag League (2012, 2013, 2014) – with Isami Kodaka
- Chō Hanabi Puroresu
  - Bakuha-ō Championship (1 time)
- Combat Zone Wrestling
  - CZW Ultraviolent Underground Championship (1 time)
- DDT Pro-Wrestling
  - DDT Extreme Championship (2 times)
  - Ironman Heavymetalweight Championship (215 times)
  - KO-D Tag Team Championship (2 times) – with Isami Kodaka (1) and Harashima (1)
- Dove Pro-Wrestling

- Dove World Heavyweight Championship (2 times)

- IWA East Coast
  - Masters of Pain Tournament (2009)
- Japan Indie Awards
  - Best Bout Award (2007) vs. Takashi Sasaki on March 14
  - Best Unit Award (2013) – with Isami Kodaka
- Pro Wrestling Freedoms
  - King Of Freedom World Title #1 Contendership One Day Tournament
- Pro Wrestling Illustrated
  - Ranked No. 216 of the top 500 wrestlers in the PWI 500 in 2020
- Pro Wrestling Wave
  - Wave Tag Team Championship (1 time) – with Isami Kodaka
- Pro Wrestling Zero1
  - NWA Intercontinental Tag Team Championship (1 time) – with Masashi Takeda
  - Fire Festival (2018)
- Tokyo Gurentai
  - Tokyo Intercontinental Tag Team Championship (1 time) – with Isami Kodaka
- Toshikoshi Puroresu
  - Tenka Toitsu! Tag Tournament (2014) – with Isami Kodaka
  - Toshiwasure! Shuffle Tag Tournament (2018) – with Konosuke Takeshita
