= Kanon (wrestler) =

Japanese professional wrestler

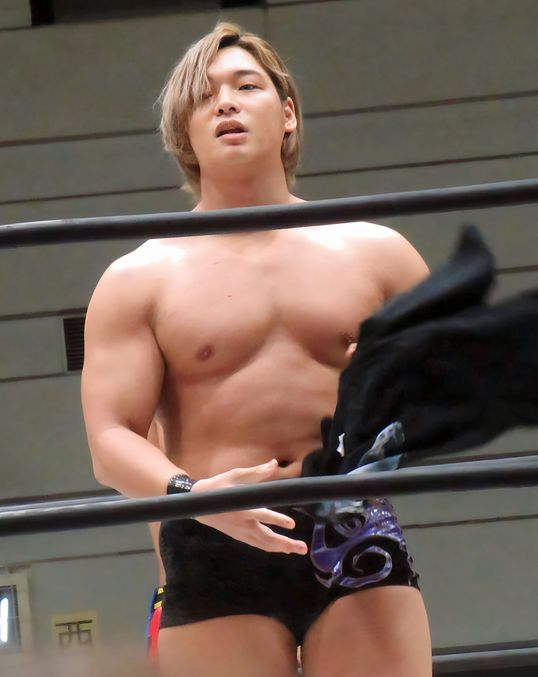
- Kanon in November 2023

Personal information
- Born: September 23, 1996 (age 29) Kanazawa, Japan

Professional wrestling career
- Ring name: Kanon
- Billed height: 180 cm (5 ft 11 in)
- Billed weight: 90 kg (198 lb)
- Trained by: Taka Michinoku
- Debut: 2019

Kanon (stylized in capital letters as KANON) is a Japanese professional wrestler signed to the Japanese promotion DDT Pro-Wrestling, where he is a two-time and reigning KO-D 6-Man Tag Team Champion (with Daisuke Sasaki and MJ Paul).

== Professional wrestling career ==
=== Independent circuit (2019–present) ===
Kanon made sporadic freelancer appearances in various promotions from the Japanese independent scene. On the first night of Pro Wrestling Zero1's 2020 edition of the Furinkazan tournament, he teamed up with Hayato Tamura and Ren Ayabe in a losing effort against Asuka and Revengers (Masato Tanaka and Takuya Sugawara). At NOAH Sanctuary, an event promoted by Pro Wrestling Noah on May 30, 2022, he teamed up with Daisuke Sasaki and MJ Paul to defeat Kongo (Hajime Ohara, Hi69 and Kenoh) in a six-man tag team match.

=== Professional Wrestling Just Tap Out (2019–2022) ===
Kanon made his professional wrestling debut at JTO Hajime on July 8, 2019, where he fell short to Ryuya Takekura. Kanon won the 2021 edition of the JTO Tournament, the flagship competition of the promotion by defeating Eagle Mask in the first rounds, Chojin Yusha G Valion in the second ones and Ryuya Takekura in the finals from March 19. The only championship he has held in the company was the Kinf of JTO Championship which he won at JTO Itadaki on November 18, 2021, by defeating Ryuya Takekura. Kanon vacated the title three and a half months later due to leaving JTO for DDT Pro-Wrestling.

=== DDT Pro-Wrestling (2022–present) ===
Kanon made his debut in DDT Pro-Wrestling at April Fool 2022 on April 10, where he defeated Yuki Ishida in singles competition. At DDT Mega Max Bump 2022 In Yokohama on May 1, he was revealed as the newest member of the Damnation T.A faction as he teamed up with stablemates Daisuke Sasaki and MJ Paul to defeat Soma Takao, Yuji Hino and Yukio Naya. Kanon won his first title in DDT, the KO-D 6-Man Tag Team Championship at Audience 2022 on May 22 by teaming up with Daisuke Sasaki and MJ Paul and defeating Eruption (Yukio Sakaguchi, Kazusada Higuchi and Hideki Okatani) in the final of a four-team tournament to win the vacant titles. He also competed for the DDT Universal Championship at DDT Friendship, Effort & Victory In Nagoya 2023 on February 19 against Naruki Doi but came out unsuccessful.

Kanon competed in various of the promotion's signature events such as the King of DDT Tournament in which he made his first appearance at the 2022 edition where he fell short to Yuki Ueno in the first rounds. As for the D-Oh Grand Prix, he made his first appearance at the 2022 edition where he placed himself in the block B and scored a total of two points after competing against Yukio Naya, Kazusada Higuchi, Yuji Hino, Chris Brookes and Mao. In the DDT Peter Pan series, Kanon made his first appearance at the 2022 edition where he teamed up with Damnation T.A stablemate Daisuke Sasaki and Dick Togo in a losing effort against The 37Kamiina (Konosuke Takeshita and Mao) and Yasu Urano in Six-man tag team action.

In the Never Mind series, he first competed at Never Mind 2022 on December 29, where he teamed up with MJ Paul and Minoru Fujita to defeat Masahiro Takanashi, Soma Takao and Antonio Honda. At DDT Sweet Dreams! 2023 on January 29, he teamed up with Paul to defeat Disaster Box (Kazuki Hirata and Toru Owashi), Akito and Antonio Honda, and Yuki Ishida and Yuya Koroku in a Four-way tag team match. In the DDT Into The Fight series, he first competed at Into The Fight 2023 on February 23, where he teamed up with MJ Paul to defeat Masahiro Takanashi and Antonio Honda. In the DDT Judgement series, Kanon debuted at Judgement 2023 on March 21, where he teamed up with Daisuke Sasaki and MJ Paul to defeat Chris Brookes, Drew Parker and Hagane Shinno.

== Championships and accomplishments ==
- DDT Pro-Wrestling
  - KO-D Tag Team Championship (3 times) – with Minoru Fujita (1), Daisuke Sasaki (1) and Mao (1)
  - KO-D 6-Man Tag Team Championship (4 times) – with Daisuke Sasaki and MJ Paul (3), and with Viento Levante and Yukio Naya (1)
  - KO-D Six Man Tag Team Title Tournament (2022)
- Professional Wrestling Just Tap Out
  - King of JTO Championship (1 time)
  - JTO Tournament (2021)
- Pro Wrestling Illustrated
  - Ranked No. 424 of the top 500 singles wrestlers in the PWI 500 in 2025
