= CyberFight =

Japanese company

CyberFight Co., Ltd.
- Trade name: CyberFight
- Native name: 株式会社CyberFight
- Romanized name: Kabushiki gaisha CyberFight
- Formerly: DDT Pro-Wrestling
- Company type: Subsidiary
- Industry: Professional wrestling; Streaming media
- Founded: July 27, 2020; 5 years ago
- Headquarters: Shiratori Building, 1F, 2-1-2 Shinjuku, Shinjuku, Tokyo, Japan
- Area served: Worldwide
- Key people: Yasuo Okamoto (President & CEO); Sanshiro Takagi (EVP); Naomichi Marufuji (EVP); Akito Nishigaki (Director)
- Brands: DDT Pro-Wrestling; Pro Wrestling Noah; Tokyo Joshi Pro Wrestling; Wrestle Universe
- Net income: ▼¥−212 million; (2024)
- Total assets: ▲¥342 million; (2024)
- Parent: CyberAgent
- Website: cyber-fight.co.jp

CyberFight Co., Ltd. (Japanese: 株式会社CyberFight, Hepburn: Kabushiki gaisha Saibāfaito), operating simply as CyberFight (CF), is a Japanese professional wrestling parent company based in Tokyo. It is a subsidiary of the CyberAgent digital advertising company. CyberFight serves as an umbrella brand for three promotions: Pro Wrestling Noah, DDT Pro-Wrestling and Tokyo Joshi Pro Wrestling.

== History ==
=== DDT Pro-Wrestling ===
In April 1997, following the success of the first Judgement event held on March 25, Sanshiro Takagi, Mikami and Nosawa Rongai left the Pro Wrestling Crusaders promotion to start their own promotion called Dramatic Dream Team with Takagi and Shoichi Ichimiya as owners. In June 2000, the promotion was incorporated as Dramatic Dream Team, Co., Ltd. (有限会社ドラマチック・ドリーム・チーム, Yūgen gaisha Doramachikku Dorīmu Chīmu) and Koichiro Kimura was appointed director. In 2003, Ichimiya was appointed representative director. In April 2004, the company changed its name to DDT Pro-Wrestling, Co., Ltd. (有限会社DDTプロレスリング, Yūgen gaisha Dī Dī Tī Puroresuringu). On December 28, 2005, Ichimiya announced his retirement from professional wrestling and stepped down from his position in the company, leaving Takagi as the sole owner and new president. In 2009, DDT changed its legal form of incorporation to a kabushiki gaisha.

=== Pro Wrestling Noah ===
On January 31, 1999, All Japan Pro Wrestling (AJPW) founder Giant Baba died and left the company to his widow Motoko Baba as owner and Mitsuharu Misawa as president. Disagreements over the proposed direction for the company led Misawa to leave AJPW on May 28, 2000, to form a new promotion called Pro Wrestling Noah. He was followed in this venture by almost the entire AJPW roster. The promotion quickly rose in popularity and was even named best promotion in 2004 and 2005, as well as having the best weekly television show in 2003 by the Wrestling Observer.

On June 13, 2009, after taking a belly to back suplex from Akitoshi Saito, Misawa lost consciousness in the ring and was taken to a hospital. He was pronounced dead in the hospital later that day due to spinal damage. Two weeks later, Akira Taue was named as Misawa's successor, taking over as president of Noah.

In March 2012, a scandal revealed that some of the Noah management had had ties to a Yakuza syndicate between 2003 and 2010. As part of the fallout, Noah lost its TV show. In the years that followed, many major stars such as Kenta Kobashi, Kenta and Jun Akiyama left the company.

On October 1, 2016, it was announced that Noah had been purchased by IT company Estbee, Co., Ltd. As a result, former AJPW president Masayuki Uchida replaced Taue as president. On November 7, Estbee changed its legal name to Noah Global Entertainment, Inc. (ノア・グローバルエンタテインメント株式会社, Noa Gurōbaru Entateinmento Kabushiki gaisha). At the end of 2016, relations between Noah and New Japan Pro-Wrestling (NJPW) reportedly turned "extremely sour" and NJPW pulled all of its wrestlers from Noah. In the months following the end of the relationship, Noah's attendance numbers went down by 29%. On January 29, 2019, Uchida announced that Lidet Entertainment had acquired 75% of Noah's shares.

=== CyberAgent and the creation of CyberFight ===
On September 1, 2017, 100% of DDT's shares were sold to the CyberAgent company. Sanshiro Takagi remained as the DDT president. On January 28, 2020, it was announced that CyberAgent had purchased Pro Wrestling Noah from Lidet Entertainment. On July 27, 2020, it was announced that Noah, DDT Pro-Wrestling and the DDT Foods company would merge in a new company that would eventually be called CyberFight. The decision came after financial troubles faced by Noah and DDT due in part to the COVID-19 pandemic. Sanshiro Takagi was named as president of the promotion and he established a plan of running events at the Tokyo Dome and overtaking NJPW in popularity. It was also revealed that the Noah and DDT brands would not be retired and would maintain their unique and current brand names, logos, etc. and would act as two separate brands within CyberFight, as well as the Tokyo Joshi Pro-Wrestling (TJPW) and Ganbare☆Pro-Wrestling (GanPro) brands, originally created and operated by DDT.

On June 6, 2021, CyberFight held its first event promoted under the CyberFight name, CyberFight Festival 2021, at the Saitama Super Arena.

On December 15, 2023, the four brands of CyberFight were announced as founding members of the United Japan Pro-Wrestling alliance, a joint effort to further develop professional wrestling in Japan through promotion and organization, with Seiji Sakaguchi being named as the chairman of the project.

On January 31, 2024, a press conference was held to announce GanPro would become independent from CyberFight at the end of March, with the final GanPro event under the CyberFight umbrella to be held on March 28.

On May 16, 2024, it was announced that Takagi would be stepping down as president of CyberFight to assume the position of executive vice president on June 1, and Yasuo Okamoto was named the new president.

== Current championships ==
=== DDT Pro-Wrestling ===
==== Singles ====
Championship	Current champion(s)	Reign	Date won	Days held	Successful defenses	Location	Notes	Ref.
KO-D Openweight Championship	Yuki Ueno	3	September 28, 2025	12	1	Tokyo, Japan	Defeated Kazuki Hirata at Dramatic Infinity 2025.	
DDT Universal Championship	Minoru Suzuki	1	March 20, 2025	204	0	Tokyo, Japan	Defeated Yuki Ueno at Judgement 2025.	
DDT Extreme Championship	To-y	1	June 15, 2025	117	0	Niigata, Japan	Defeated Super Sasadango Machine in a Best two-out-of-three-falls match score (2-1) at Echigo Power Slam	
O-40 Championship	Antonio Honda	1	April 23, 2025	170	0	Tokyo, Japan	Defeated Toru Owashi at DDT Spring Fist Festival: Ueno Is Still Going On.	
World Ōmori Championship	Masahiro Takanashi	1	November 10, 2024	334	0	Tokyo, Japan	Defeated Soma Takao at UTAN Festa 2024.	
Ironman Heavymetalweight Championship	Mahiro Kiryu	2	September 20, 2025	20	—	Tokyo, Japan	Took place during an eight-person battle royal at Wrestle Princess VI.	

==== Tag teams ====
Championship	Current champion(s)	Reign	Date won	Days held	Successful defenses	Location	Notes	Ref.
KO-D Tag Team Championship	The Apex (Yuki Iino and Yukio Naya)	1 (2, 1)	June 29, 2025	103	3	Tokyo, Japan	Defeated Astronauts (Fuminori Abe and Takuya Nomura) at DDT King of Kings.	
KO-D 6-Man Tag Team Championship	Kaisei Takechi and The 37Kamiina (To-y and Yuki Ueno)	1 (1, 1, 3)	September 28, 2025	12+	0	Tokyo, Japan	Defeated Damnation T.A. (MJ Paul, Hideki Okatani and Ilusion) to win the vacant titles at Dramatic Infinity 2025.	
KO-D 10-Man Tag Team Championship	Keigo Nakamura, To-y, Yuya Koroku, Yuki Ishida and Kazuma Sumi	1 (2, 2, 1, 1, 1)	October 19, 2024	356	0	Tokyo, Japan	Defeated Schadenfreude International (Masahiro Takanashi, Chris Brookes, Takeshi Masada, and Mecha Mummy) and Munetatsu Nakamura at DDT Pro-Wrestling in Ikebukuro Full Moon Festival 2024.	

=== Pro Wrestling Noah ===
==== Singles ====
Championship	Current champion(s)	Reign	Date won	Days held	Successful defenses	Location	Notes	Ref.
GHC Heavyweight Championship	Kenta	2	July 20, 2025	82	1	Tokyo, Japan	Defeated Kenoh at New Departure 2025.	
GHC National Championship	Galeno	1	April 11, 2025	182	3	Niigata, Japan	Defeated Tetsuya Endo to win the vacant championship at Sunny Voyage 2025.	
GHC Junior Heavyweight Championship	Hiromu Takahashi	1	September 8, 2025	32	0	Tokyo, Japan	Defeated Yo-Hey at 2025 N-1 Victory Night 1.	
GHC Hardcore Championship	Hayata	1	June 30, 2025	102	0	Tokyo, Japan	Defeated Shuji Ishikawa at Noah Wrestle Magic 2025.	

==== Tag teams ====
Championship	Current champion(s)	Reign	Date won	Days held	Successful defenses	Location	Notes	Ref.
GHC Tag Team Championship	Team 2000X (Masa Kitamiya and Takashi Sugiura)	1 (8, 11)	August 11, 2025	60	0	Kawasaki, Japan	Defeated Team 2000X (Masa Kitamiya and Takashi Sugiura) at Noah Kawasaki Summer Voyage 2025.	
GHC Junior Heavyweight Tag Team Championship	Los Golpeadores (Alpha Wolf and Dragon Bane)	2	May 3, 2025	160	3	Tokyo, Japan	Defeated Amakusa and Junta Miyawaki at Memorial Voyage in Kokugikan.	

==== Women's ====
Championship	Current champion(s)	Reign	Date won	Days held	Successful defenses	Location	Notes	Ref.
GHC Women's Championship	Takumi Iroha	1	June 2, 2025	130	3	Tokyo, Japan	Defeated Kouki Amarei at NOAH Monday Magic.	

=== Tokyo Joshi Pro Wrestling ===
Championship	Current champion(s)	Reign	Date won	Days held	Successful defenses	Location	Notes	Ref.
Princess of Princess Championship	Miu Watanabe	2	September 20, 2025	20	0	Tokyo, Japan	Defeated Mizuki at Wrestle Princess VI.	
International Princess Championship	Arisu Endo	1	September 20, 2025	20	0	Tokyo, Japan	Defeated Priscilla Kelly at Wrestle Princess VI to win the vacant title. Previous champion Moka Miyamoto vacated the title due to being sidelined with illness.	
Princess Tag Team Championship	Ober Eats (Yuki Kamifuku and Wakana Uehara)	1 (1, 1)	September 20, 2025	20	0	Tokyo, Japan	Defeated Kyoraku Kyomei (Hyper Misao and Shoko Nakajima) at Wrestle Princess VI.	

== See also ==
- Professional wrestling in Japan
- List of professional wrestling promotions in Japan
- Pro Wrestling Noah
- DDT Pro-Wrestling
- Tokyo Joshi Pro Wrestling
- WWE brand extension
