= Chris Brookes =

English wrestler (born 1991)

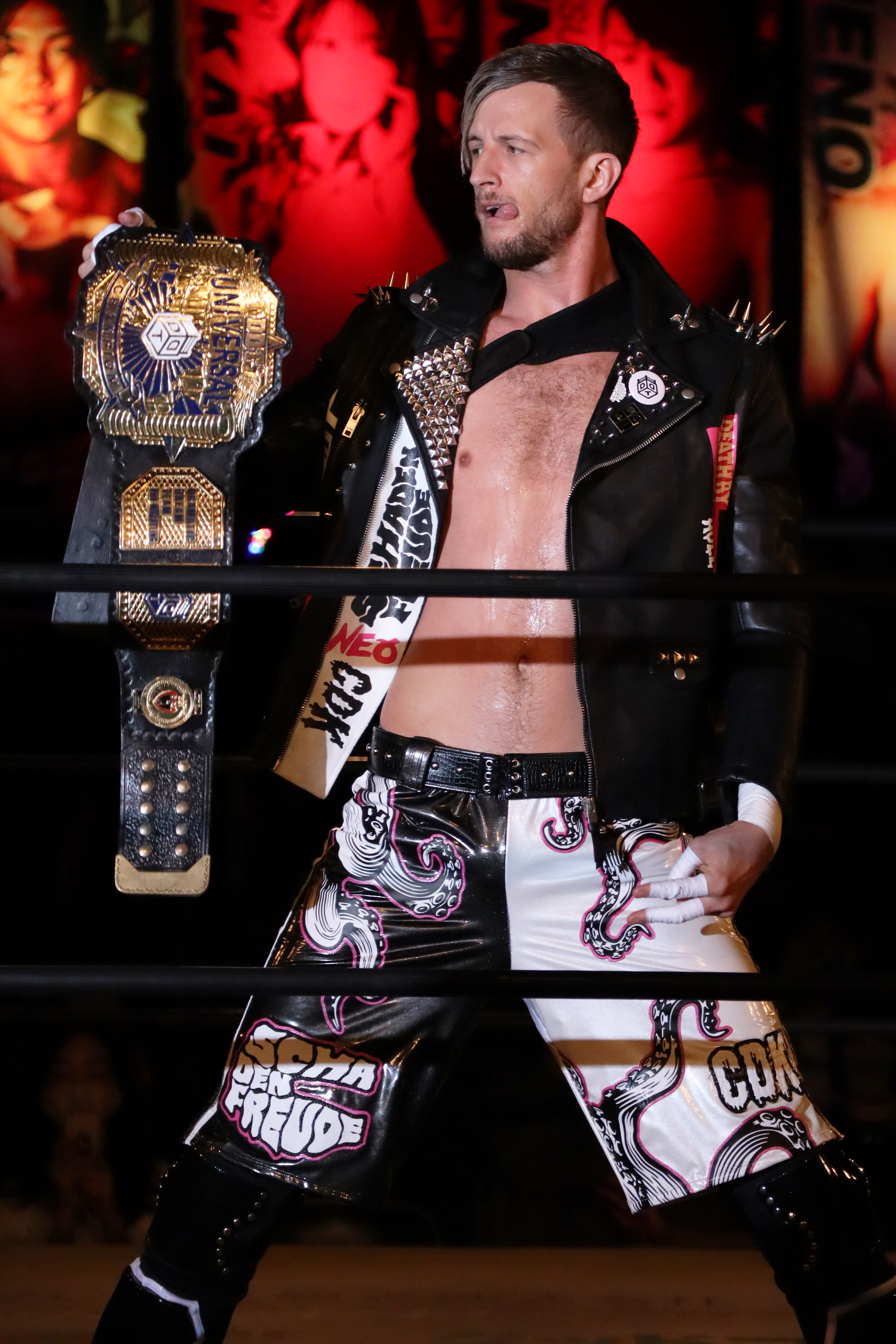
- Brookes as the DDT Universal Champion in 2020

Personal information
- Born: 24 August 1991 (age 35) Tipton, England

Professional wrestling career
- Ring name(s): Chris Brookes; Chris Drago
- Billed height: 6 ft 4 in (1.93 m)
- Billed weight: 207 lb (94 kg)
- Trained by: Jim Hunter; Lee Hunter
- Debut: 2007

Chris Brookes (Note: クリス・ブルックス, Kurisu Burukkusu) (born 24 August 1991) is an English professional wrestler. He is signed to Japanese promotion DDT Pro-Wrestling, where he is a two-time KO-D Openweight Champion, two-time DDT Universal Champion, one-time DDT Extreme Champion, five-time Ironman Heavymetalweight Champion, and the winner of the 2022 King of Street Wrestling and 2023 King of DDT tournaments.

Before moving to Japan, Brookes also performed for European and American promotions such as Attack! Pro Wrestling, Combat Zone Wrestling, Progress Wrestling, Revolution Pro Wrestling, and Westside Xtreme Wrestling.

== Early life ==
Brookes was born in Tipton on 24 August 1991.

== Career ==
=== Early career (2007–2017) ===
Brookes was trained by Jim Hunter and Lee Hunter. In 2007, at the age of 16, he made his debut on the British independent circuit.

=== Progress Wrestling (2017–2020, 2022) ===
On 24 August 2019 at Progress x APC, a joint event organised Progress Wrestling and the French Association les Professionels du Catch (APC), Brookes lost to Tristan Archer in a three way match also including Aigle Blanc and failed to capture the APC Championship.

=== Revolution Pro Wrestling (2017–2018) ===
Joining Revolution Pro Wrestling, Brookes formed the tag team CCK (Commonwealth Catch Kings) alongside Travis Banks, winning the Revolution Pro Wrestling tag team titles from Charlie Sterling and Joel Redman in his first match for the company. CCK successfully defended those titles against a number of teams including Ryan Smile and Shane Strickland, Sami Callihan and Martin Stone, and Los Ingobernables de Japón (Bushi and Hiromu Takahashi) before losing the belts to Moustache Mountain (Trent Seven and Tyler Bate).

CCK had a successful Global Wars 2017, defeating Chaos (Rocky Romero and Yoshi-Hashi) on the first night of the event and successfully teaming with Kid Lykos on the second night against the team of Gedo, Hirooki Goto, and Yoshi-Hashi. CCK then attempted to regain the tag team titles from new champions Suzuki-gun (Minoru Suzuki and Zack Sabre Jr.) but lost at Epic Encounter 2018.

=== DDT Pro-Wrestling (2019–present) ===
Brookes started wrestling for DDT Pro-Wrestling in June 2019. He began teaming with Masahiro Takanashi, naming themselves CDK (Calamari Drunken Kings). At Wrestle Peter Pan, they defeated Moonlight Express (Mao and Mike Bailey). At Summer Vacation, Brookes lost to Konosuke Takeshita, failing to win the KO-D Openweight Championship. From 29 November to 28 December 2019, he was an entrant in the D-Oh Grand Prix, where he tied Tetsuya Endo for first place in block A. He lost the subsequent tie-breaking match to Endo.

In January 2020, Brookes announced that he would spend the rest of the year in Japan, as he wanted DDT to be his primary commitment; soon after his announcement, the outbreak of the COVID-19 pandemic rendered him unable to leave the country anyway, and he eventually decided to settle there permanently. On 23 February at Into the Fight, he defeated Takeshita to become the inaugural DDT Universal Champion. On 20 March at Judgement 2020: DDT 23rd Anniversary, he lost the title to Daisuke Sasaki.

On 14 March 2021 at Day Dream Believer 2021, Brookes won his first DDT Extreme Championship by defeating Shunma Katsumata in a barbed wire coffin deathmatch.

On 20 March 2022, at Judgement 2022: DDT 25th Anniversary, CDK defeated Disaster Box (Harashima and Naomi Yoshimura) to win their first KO-D Tag Team Championship. On 23 April, Brookes won the King of Street Wrestling tournament by defeating Abdullah Kobayashi in the final.

On 21 May 2023, Brookes won the King of DDT Tournament, defeating Jun Akiyama in the semifinals and Kazusada Higuchi in the finals; this earned him a title shot for the KO-D Openweight Championship. On 23 July at Wrestle Peter Pan 2023, he defeated Yuji Hino for the KO-D Openweight Championship. After two successful defenses, against Shigehiro Irie and Saki Akai, he lost the title to Yuki Ueno at Ultimate Party 2023. When speaking to reporters immediately after the loss, Brookes announced that he had formed a new stable called Schadenfreude International with Masahiro Takanashi, Antonio Honda, and Takeshi Masada.

On 4 November 2024 at Sumida Dramatic Dream, Brookes defeated Shinya Aoki to regain the KO-D Openweight Championship.

=== Baka Gaijin + Friends (2022–present) ===
On 13 December 2022, Brookes and Drew Parker produced an event celebrating Brookes' 15th anniversary in wrestling. The event, Baka Gaijin + Friends, (Note: "Baka gaijin" is a Japanese phrase meaning "dumb foreigner" and is often used by foreigners in Japan as a self-deprecating joke.) was held at a curry restaurant in Shimokitazawa without a ring and in front of 50 customers. In the main event, CDK (Brookes and Takanashi) defeated Parker and Mao. Since then, Baka Gaijin + Friends has become a monthly show at the restaurant.

On 21 January 2025 at Baka Gaijin + Friends Vol. 19: Investigation of a Citizen Above Suspicion, Brookes defeated Ram Kaicho to become the first BK-G Openweight Champion, winning a homemade belt made of cardboard parodying the KO-D Openweight Championship. He lost the championship on 15 April at Baka Gaijin + Friends Vol. 21: The Beginning of the End, in a three-way match against Mr. Bueno and eventual winner Mr. Malo. On 22 August, he helped stage Baka Gaijin + Friends MNL, a joint event with the Filipino promotion Dexcon in Makati.

== Other media ==
In February 2022, Brookes appeared in a video by Japan-based Welsh voice actor and YouTuber Connor Colquhoun, in which he joined wrestlers such as Konosuke Takeshita and Toy Kojima in helping Colquhoun undergo training as a professional wrestler.

== Championships and accomplishments ==
- Attack! Pro Wrestling
  - Attack! 24:7 Championship (1 time)
  - Attack! Tag Team Championship (5 times) – with Kid Lykos (4) and Kid Lykos II (1)
- Baka Gaijin + Friends
  - BK-G Openweight Championship (1 time)
- Combat Zone Wrestling
  - CZW World Tag Team Championship (1 time) – with Kid Lykos
- DDT Pro-Wrestling
  - DDT Extreme Championship (1 time)
  - DDT Universal Championship (2 times)
  - Ironman Heavymetalweight Championship (6 times)
  - KO-D 10-Man Tag Team Championship (1 time) – with Masahiro Takanashi, Antonio Honda, Takeshi Masada, Mecha Mummy and Takayuki Ueki
  - KO-D Openweight Championship (2 times)
  - KO-D Tag Team Championship (3 times) – with Masahiro Takanashi (1), Takeshi Masada (1) and Harashima (1)
  - King of DDT (2023)
  - King of Street Wrestling (2022)
- Gatoh Move Pro Wrestling
  - Asia Dream Tag Team Championship (1 time) – with Masa Takanashi
- Good Wrestling
  - Good Wrestling Grand Prize Championship (1 time)
- Fight Club: Pro
  - FCP Championship (1 time)
  - FCP Tag Team Championship (2 times) – with Kid Lykos (1) and Kyle Fletcher (1)
  - Dream Tag Team Invitational (2017) – with Kid Lykos
  - Infinity Trophy (2014)
- Plex Wrestling
  - Plex Wrestling British Championship (1 time)
  - Plex Wrestling British Title Tournament (2015)
- Pro Wrestling Illustrated
  - Ranked No. 88 of the 500 best singles wrestlers in the PWI 500 in 2025
- Progress Wrestling
  - Progress Tag Team Championship (3 times) – with Kid Lykos
- Revolution Pro Wrestling
  - RPW Undisputed British Tag Team Championship (1 time) – with Travis Banks
- Setup Thailand Pro Wrestling
  - IWA Japan Setup World Tag Team Championship (1 time) – with Masahiro Takanashi
- Shropshire Wrestling Alliance
  - SWA British Lions Championship (1 time, final)
  - British Lions Tournament (2015)
- Singapore Pro Wrestling
  - SPW Southeast Asian Tag Team Championship (1 time) – with Masa Takanashi
- Southside Wrestling Entertainment
  - SWE Tag Team Championship (1 time) – with Kid Lykos
- Westside Xtreme Wrestling
  - wXw Shotgun Championship (1 time)
- Wrestling Association Of Rugby
  - WAR Tag Team Championship (1 time) – with Falcon
