= List of professional wrestling matches rated 5 or more stars by Dave Meltzer =

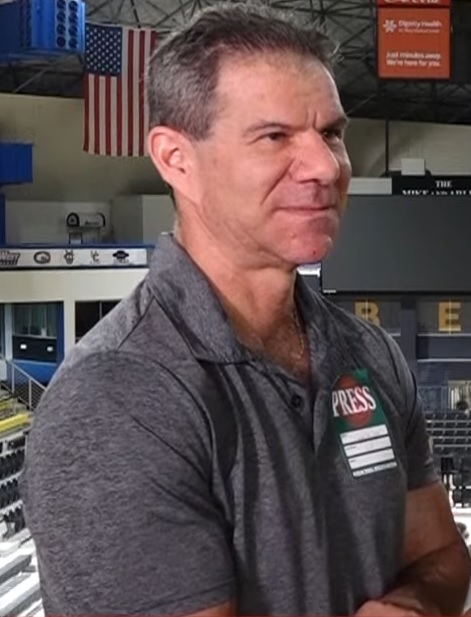
Dave Meltzer

Journalist and sports historian Dave Meltzer has assigned his ratings to professional wrestling matches since the creation of his publication, the Wrestling Observer Newsletter in the 1980s, and named his first 5-star match in April 1983. Receiving a 5 or higher star rating is considered by many in professional wrestling to be a great achievement.

The first match rated more than five stars by Meltzer was Ric Flair vs. Ricky Steamboat in 1989, which received a six star rating. The highest-ever rating is seven stars, awarded to Kazuchika Okada vs. Kenny Omega at Dominion 6.9 in Osaka-jo Hall in June 2018.

As of November 2026, 357 matches have earned a five-star rating or higher, with Will Ospreay holding the individual record with 60 appearances. Ospreay is also one of five wrestlers to have been awarded five stars for two matches on the same night, alongside Akira Hokuto, Kyoko Inoue, Manami Toyota, and Toshiyo Yamada.

== Matches ==
=== 1980s ===
	Date	Match	Promotion	Event	Rating	Notes	Ref.
1	April 7, 1982	Ric Flair vs. Butch Reed (Note: Occurred before the creation of the Wrestling Observer Newsletter)	CWF	Miami Beach show	5	for the NWA World Heavyweight Championship	
2	April 21, 1983	Dynamite Kid vs. Tiger Mask	NJPW	Big Fight Series II; Night 19	5	for the WWF Junior Heavyweight Championship	
3	December 5, 1984	Kazuo Yamazaki vs. Nobuhiko Takada	UWF	Year-End Special; Day 10	5		
4	December 8, 1984	Bruiser Brody and Stan Hansen vs. Dory Funk Jr. and Terry Funk	AJPW	Real World Tag League; Night 15	5		
5	March 9, 1985	Kuniaki Kobayashi vs. Tiger Mask	AJPW	85 Gekitoh! Exciting Wars; Night 14	5		
6	August 22, 1985	Lioness Asuka vs. Jaguar Yokota	AJW	Summer Night Festival in Budokan	5	for the WWWA World Singles Championship	
7	January 28, 1986	Jumbo Tsuruta and Genichiro Tenryu vs. Riki Choshu and Yoshiaki Yatsu	AJPW	New Years War Super Battle; Night 25	5	for the NWA International Tag Team Championship	
8	February 14, 1986	Ric Flair vs. Barry Windham	CWF	Battle of the Belts 2	5	for the NWA World Heavyweight Championship	
9	April 19, 1986	The Fantastics (Bobby Fulton and Tommy Rogers) vs. The Sheepherders (Butch Miller and Luke Williams)	JCP	Crockett Cup	5		
10	January 20, 1987	Ric Flair vs. Barry Windham	JCP	World Wide Wrestling	5	for the NWA World Heavyweight Championship	
11	February 26, 1987	Chigusa Nagayo vs. Lioness Asuka	AJW	Kawasaki show	5	for the WWWA World Singles Championship	
12	March 20, 1987	Akira Maeda and Nobuhiko Takada vs. Keiji Muto and Shiro Koshinaka	NJPW	Spring Flare Up; Night 21	5	for the IWGP Tag Team Championship	
13	April 11, 1987	Ric Flair vs. Barry Windham	JCP	Crockett Cup	5	for the NWA World Heavyweight Championship	
14	July 4, 1987	Paul Ellering, The Road Warriors (Hawk and Animal), and The Super Powers (Dusty Rhodes and Nikita Koloff) vs. The Four Horsemen (Arn Anderson, Lex Luger, Ric Flair, Tully Blanchard, and J. J. Dillon)	JCP	The Great American Bash	5	WarGames match	
15	July 31, 1987	Paul Ellering, The Road Warriors (Hawk and Animal), and The Super Powers (Dusty Rhodes and Nikita Koloff) vs. The Four Horsemen (Arn Anderson, Lex Luger, Ric Flair, The War Machine, and Tully Blanchard)	JCP	The Great American Bash	5	WarGames match	
16	December 6, 1987	Chigusa Nagayo, Mika Suzuki, Mika Takahashi, Yachiya Hirata, Yumi Ogura, and Yumiko Hotta vs. Etsuko Mita, Kazue Nagahori, Lioness Asuka, Mika Komatsu, Mitsuko Nishiwaki, and Sachiko Nakamura	AJW	Korakuen Hall show	5		
17	December 16, 1988	Genichiro Tenryu and Toshiaki Kawada vs. Stan Hansen and Terry Gordy	AJPW	Real World Tag League; Night 23	5		
18	January 28, 1989	Genichiro Tenryu, Toshiaki Kawada, and Samson Fuyuki vs. Jumbo Tsuruta, Yoshiaki Yatsu, and Masanobu Fuchi	AJPW	New Year Giant Series; Night 17	5		
19	February 20, 1989	Ric Flair vs. Ricky Steamboat	WCW	Chi-Town Rumble	5	for the NWA World Heavyweight Championship	
20	March 18, 1989	Ric Flair vs. Ricky Steamboat	WCW	Landover, MD show	6	for the NWA World Heavyweight Championship	
21	April 2, 1989	Ric Flair vs. Ricky Steamboat	WCW	Clash of the Champions VI	5	Two out of Three falls match	
22	May 7, 1989	Ric Flair vs. Ricky Steamboat	WCW	WrestleWar	5	for the NWA World Heavyweight Championship	
23	June 5, 1989	Jumbo Tsuruta vs. Genichiro Tenryu	AJPW	Super Power Series; Night 18	5	for the Triple Crown Heavyweight Championship	
24	November 15, 1989	Ric Flair vs. Terry Funk	WCW	Clash of the Champions IX	5	"I Quit" match	

=== 1990s ===
		Date	Match	Promotion	Event	Rating	Notes	Ref.
25	1	January 31, 1990	Jushin Thunder Liger vs. Naoki Sano	NJPW	New Year Golden Series	5	for the IWGP Junior Heavyweight Championship	
26	2	June 8, 1990	Jumbo Tsuruta vs. Mitsuharu Misawa	AJPW	Super Power Series; Night 19	5		
27	3	September 30, 1990	Jumbo Tsuruta and Akira Taue vs. Mitsuharu Misawa and Toshiaki Kawada	AJPW	October Giant Series; Night 2	5		
28	4	October 19, 1990	Mitsuharu Misawa, Toshiaki Kawada, and Kenta Kobashi vs. Jumbo Tsuruta, Masanobu Fuchi, and Akira Taue	AJPW	October Giant Series; Night 16	5		
29	5	January 4, 1991	Akira Hokuto vs. Bull Nakano	AJW	Korakuen Hall show	5	for the WWWA World Singles Championship	
30	6	February 24, 1991	The Four Horsemen (Barry Windham, Larry Zbyszko, Ric Flair, and Sid Vicious) vs. Brian Pillman, Sting, and The Steiner Brothers (Rick Steiner and Scott Steiner)	WCW	WrestleWar	5	WarGames match	
31	7	April 20, 1991	Mitsuharu Misawa, Toshiaki Kawada, and Kenta Kobashi vs. Jumbo Tsuruta, Masanobu Fuchi, and Akira Taue	AJPW	Fan Appreciation Day	5		
32	8	August 9, 1991	Big Van Vader vs. Keiji Mutoh	NJPW	G1 Climax 1991; Night 2	5		
33	9	April 25, 1992	Kyoko Inoue vs. Manami Toyota	AJW	Wrestlemarinepiad	5	for the IWA World Women's Championship	
34	10	April 30, 1992	El Samurai vs. Jushin Thunder Liger	NJPW	Explosion Tour; Night 13 (Final)	5	Top of the Super Juniors III tournament final	
35	11	May 16, 1992	Atsushi Onita, El Hijo del Santo and Tarzan Goto vs. Horace Boulder, Negro Casas and Tim Patterson	FMW/WWA	Los Ángeles show	5	Two out of Three falls match	
36	12	May 17, 1992	Dangerous Alliance (Arn Anderson, Bobby Eaton, Larry Zbyszko, Rick Rude, and Steve Austin) vs. Sting's Squadron (Barry Windham, Dustin Rhodes, Nikita Koloff, Ricky Steamboat, and Sting)	WCW	WrestleWar	5	WarGames match	
37	13	May 22, 1992	Mitsuharu Misawa, Toshiaki Kawada, and Kenta Kobashi vs. Jumbo Tsuruta, Masanobu Fuchi, and Akira Taue	AJPW	Super Power Series; Night 6	5		
38	14	May 25, 1992	Kenta Kobashi and Tsuyoshi Kikuchi vs. Can-Am Express (Doug Furnas and Dan Kroffat)	AJPW	Super Power Series; Night 8	5	for the All Asia Tag Team Championship	
39	15	July 5, 1992	Kenta Kobashi and Tsuyoshi Kikuchi vs. Masanobu Fuchi and Yoshinari Ogawa	AJPW	Summer Action Series; Night 2	5	for the All Asia Tag Team Championship	
40	16	August 15, 1992	Manami Toyota vs. Toshiyo Yamada	AJW	Mid Summer Typhoon	5	Hair vs. Hair match for the IWA World Women's Championship	
41	17	April 2, 1993	Kyoko Inoue and Takako Inoue vs. Cutie Suzuki and Mayumi Ozaki	AJW	Dream Slam I	5		
42	18	April 2, 1993	Shinobu Kandori vs. Akira Hokuto	AJW	Dream Slam I	5		
43	19	April 11, 1993	Manami Toyota and Toshiyo Yamada vs. Dynamite Kansai and Mayumi Ozaki	AJW	Dream Slam II	5	Two out of Three falls match for the WWWA World Tag Team Championship	
44	20	April 18, 1993	Bull Nakano vs. Devil Masami	JWP	Korakuen Hall show	5		
45	21	April 25, 1993	Kenta Kobashi vs. Toshiaki Kawada	AJPW	Champion Carnival	5		
46	22	July 2, 1993	Mitsuharu Misawa, Kenta Kobashi, and Jun Akiyama vs. Yoshinari Ogawa and Holy Demon Army (Toshiaki Kawada and Akira Taue)	AJPW	Summer Action Series; Night 1	5		
47	23	July 29, 1993	Kenta Kobashi vs. Stan Hansen	AJPW	Summer Action Series; Night 22	5		
48	24	July 31, 1993	Aja Kong, Kyoko Inoue, Takako Inoue, and Sakie Hasegawa vs. Cutie Suzuki, Dynamite Kansai, Mayumi Ozaki, and Hikari Fukuoka	JWP	Thunder Queen Battle in Yokohama	5	60 Minute Iron Woman "First Attack" tag match	
49	25	August 31, 1993	Kenta Kobashi vs. Steve Williams	AJPW	Summer Action Series II; Night 10	5	Triple Crown Heavyweight Championship #1 contendership	
50	26	December 3, 1993	The Holy Demon Army (Toshiaki Kawada and Akira Taue) vs. Kenta Kobashi and Mitsuharu Misawa	AJPW	Real World Tag League; Night 18 (Final)	5	for the AJPW World Tag Team Championship	
51	27	December 6, 1993	Manami Toyota and Toshiyo Yamada vs. Dynamite Kansai and Mayumi Ozaki	AJW	St. Battle Final	5	for the WWWA World Tag Team Championship	
52	28	December 10, 1993	Manami Toyota and Akira Hokuto vs. Toshiyo Yamada and Kyoko Inoue	AJW	Tag League The Best	5		
53	29	December 10, 1993	Manami Toyota and Akira Hokuto vs. Toshiyo Yamada and Kyoko Inoue	AJW	Tag League The Best	5	tournament final	
54	30	January 29, 1994	Mitsuharu Misawa, Kenta Kobashi, and Giant Baba vs. Masanobu Fuchi and Holy Demon Army (Toshiaki Kawada and Akira Taue)	AJPW	New Year Giant Series; Night 20	5		
55	31	March 20, 1994	Razor Ramon vs. Shawn Michaels	WWF	WrestleMania X	5	Ladder match for the WWF Intercontinental Championship	
56	32	April 16, 1994	The Great Sasuke vs. Wild Pegasus	NJPW	Super J-Cup	5	tournament final	
57	33	May 21, 1994	Mitsuharu Misawa and Kenta Kobashi vs. The Holy Demon Army (Toshiaki Kawada and Akira Taue)	AJPW	Super Power Series; Night 6	5	for the AJPW World Tag Team Championship	
58	34	June 3, 1994	Mitsuharu Misawa vs. Toshiaki Kawada	AJPW	Super Power Series; Night 16	5	for the Triple Crown Heavyweight Championship	
59	35	July 8, 1994	The Great Sasuke vs. Jushin Thunder Liger	NJPW	Summer Struggle	5		
60	36	August 29, 1994	Bret Hart vs. Owen Hart	WWF	SummerSlam	5	Steel Cage match for the WWF Championship	
61	37	October 9, 1994	Kyoko Inoue and Takako Inoue vs. Manami Toyota and Toshiyo Yamada	AJW	Wrestlemarinpiad	5	Two out of Three falls match for the WWWA World Tag Team Championship	
62	38	November 6, 1994	Los Gringos Locos (Art Barr and Eddy Guerrero) vs. El Hijo del Santo and Octagón	AAA	When Worlds Collide	5	Two out of Three falls Masks vs. Hairs tag match	
63	39	November 20, 1994	Aja Kong vs. Manami Toyota	AJW	Big Egg Wrestling Universe	5		
64	40	November 30, 1994	Rey Misterio Jr. vs. Juventud Guerrera	AAA	Matamoros show	5	Two out of Three falls match for the WWA World Lightweight Championship	
65	41	January 19, 1995	Kenta Kobashi vs. Toshiaki Kawada	AJPW	New Year Giant Series; Night 14	5	for the Triple Crown Heavyweight Championship	
66	42	January 24, 1995	Mitsuharu Misawa and Kenta Kobashi vs. The Holy Demon Army (Toshiaki Kawada and Akira Taue)	AJPW	New Year Giant Series; Night 17	5	for the AJPW World Tag Team Championship	
67	43	March 4, 1995	Kenta Kobashi and Mitsuharu Misawa vs. Johnny Ace and Steve Williams	AJPW	Excite Series; Night 12	5	for the AJPW World Tag Team Championship	
68	44	April 15, 1995	Akira Taue vs. Mitsuharu Misawa	AJPW	Champion Carnival; Night 19 (Final)	5		
69	45	May 7, 1995	Manami Toyota vs. Kyoko Inoue	AJW	G*Top 2nd	5	for the WWWA World Singles Championship	
70	46	June 9, 1995	Kenta Kobashi and Mitsuharu Misawa vs. The Holy Demon Army (Toshiaki Kawada and Akira Taue)	AJPW	Super Power Series; Night 15	5	for the AJPW World Tag Team Championship	
71	47	June 27, 1995	Manami Toyota vs. Aja Kong	AJW	Zenjo Movement; Night 40	5	for the WWWA World Singles Championship	
72	48	June 30, 1995	Mitsuharu Misawa, Kenta Kobashi, and Satoru Asako vs. Tamon Honda and Holy Demon Army (Toshiaki Kawada and Akira Taue)	AJPW	Summer Action Series; Night 1	5		
73	49	July 23, 1995	Manami Toyota vs. Mima Shimoda	AJW	Japan Grand Prix; Night 8	5		
74	50	August 30, 1995	Kyoko Inoue and Takako Inoue vs. Manami Toyota and Sakie Hasegawa	AJW	WWWA Champions Night	5	Two out of Three falls match for the WWWA World Tag Team Championship	
75	51	September 2, 1995	Akira Hokuto vs. Manami Toyota	AJW	Destiny	5		
76	52	September 22, 1995	Rey Misterio Jr. vs. Psicosis	AAA	Mexico City show	5	Two out of Three falls match for the WWA World Welterweight Championship	
77	53	March 9, 1996	Juventud Guerrera vs. Rey Misterio Jr.	ECW	Big Ass Extreme Bash	5	Two out of Three falls match	
78	54	May 23, 1996	Mitsuharu Misawa and Jun Akiyama vs. The Holy Demon Army (Toshiaki Kawada and Akira Taue)	AJPW	Super Power Series; Night 5	5	for the AJPW World Tag Team Championship	
79	55	June 7, 1996	Jun Akiyama and Mitsuharu Misawa vs. Johnny Ace and Steve Williams	AJPW	Super Power Series; Night 15	5	for the AJPW World Tag Team Championship	
80	56	October 10, 1996	Kaientai DX (Dick Togo, Men's Teioh, Shiryu, Shoichi Funaki, and Taka Michinoku) vs. Gran Hamada, Gran Naniwa, Masato Yakushiji, Super Delfin, and Tiger Mask IV	Michinoku Pro	3rd Anniversary – "These Days"	5		
81	57	December 6, 1996	Holy Demon Army (Toshiaki Kawada and Akira Taue) vs. Jun Akiyama and Mitsuharu Misawa	AJPW	Real World Tag League; Night 16 (Final)	5		
82	58	January 20, 1997	Kenta Kobashi vs. Mitsuharu Misawa	AJPW	Super Power Series; Night 14	5 (Note: Originally 4.75, but later revised)	for the Triple Crown Heavyweight Championship	
83	59	March 23, 1997	Bret Hart vs. Stone Cold Steve Austin	WWF	WrestleMania 13	5	No Disqualification Submission match	
84	60	June 5, 1997	Koji Kanemoto vs. El Samurai	NJPW	Best of the Super Juniors IV; Night 17 (Final)	5		
85	61	June 6, 1997	Mitsuharu Misawa vs. Toshiaki Kawada	AJPW	Super Power Series; Night 16	5	for the Triple Crown Heavyweight Championship	
86	62	October 5, 1997	Shawn Michaels vs. The Undertaker	WWF	In Your House 18: Badd Blood	5	Hell in a Cell match for WWF Championship #1 contendership	
87	63	December 5, 1997	The Holy Demon Army (Toshiaki Kawada and Akira Taue) vs. Jun Akiyama and Mitsuharu Misawa	AJPW	Real World Tag League; Night 15 (Final)	5		
88	64	June 27, 1998	Kiyoshi Tamura vs. Tsuyoshi Kosaka	RINGS	Fourth Fighting Integration	5	RINGS rules	
89	65	October 31, 1998	Kenta Kobashi vs. Mitsuharu Misawa	AJPW	26th Anniversary Show	5	for the Triple Crown Heavyweight Championship	
90	66	June 11, 1999	Mitsuharu Misawa vs. Kenta Kobashi	AJPW	Super Power Series; Night 14	5	for the Triple Crown Heavyweight Championship	
91	67	October 23, 1999	Mitsuharu Misawa and Yoshinari Ogawa vs. Burning (Kenta Kobashi and Jun Akiyama)	AJPW	October Giant Series; Night 11	5	for the AJPW World Tag Team Championship	

=== 2000s ===
		Date	Match	Promotion	Event	Rating	Notes	Ref.
92	1	December 14, 2000	Masanobu Fuchi and Toshiaki Kawada vs. Takashi Iizuka and Yuji Nagata	NJPW	The 2nd Judgement!!	5		
93	2	March 1, 2003	Mitsuharu Misawa vs. Kenta Kobashi	Noah	Navigate For Evolution	5	for the GHC Heavyweight Championship	
94	3	July 10, 2004	Kenta Kobashi vs. Jun Akiyama	Noah	Departure	5	for the GHC Heavyweight Championship	
95	4	October 16, 2004	Samoa Joe vs. CM Punk	ROH	Joe vs. Punk II	5	for the ROH World Championship	
96	5	September 11, 2005	Christopher Daniels vs. AJ Styles vs. Samoa Joe	TNA	Unbreakable	5	for the TNA X Division Championship	
97	6	October 1, 2005	Samoa Joe vs. Kenta Kobashi	ROH	Joe vs. Kobashi	5		
98	7	March 31, 2006	Cima, Masato Yoshino, and Naruki Doi vs. Dragon Kid, Genki Horiguchi, and Ryo Saito	ROH	Supercard of Honor	5		

=== 2010s ===
		Date	Match	Promotion	Event	Rating	Notes	Ref.
99	1	July 17, 2011	CM Punk vs. John Cena	WWE	Money in the Bank	5	for the WWE Championship	
100	2	March 31, 2012	Davey Richards vs. Michael Elgin	ROH	Showdown in the Sun	5	for the ROH World Championship	
101	3	October 8, 2012	Hiroshi Tanahashi vs. Minoru Suzuki	NJPW	King of Pro Wrestling	5	for the IWGP Heavyweight Championship	
102	4	April 7, 2013	Hiroshi Tanahashi vs. Kazuchika Okada	NJPW	Invasion Attack	5	for the IWGP Heavyweight Championship	
103	5	August 4, 2013	Katsuyori Shibata vs. Tomohiro Ishii	NJPW	G1 Climax 23; Night 4	5		
104	6	October 14, 2013	Kazuchika Okada vs. Hiroshi Tanahashi	NJPW	King of Pro Wrestling	5	for the IWGP Heavyweight Championship	
105	7	September 21, 2014	Hiroshi Tanahashi vs. Katsuyori Shibata	NJPW	Destruction in Kobe	5		
106	8	January 4, 2015	Shinsuke Nakamura vs. Kota Ibushi	NJPW	Wrestle Kingdom 9	5	for the IWGP Intercontinental Championship	
107	9	February 14, 2015	Tomoaki Honma vs. Tomohiro Ishii	NJPW	The New Beginning in Sendai	5	for the NEVER Openweight Championship	
108	10	August 16, 2015	Hiroshi Tanahashi vs. Shinsuke Nakamura	NJPW	G1 Climax 25; Final	5	Tournament Final	
109	11	November 1, 2015	Masaaki Mochizuki vs. Shingo Takagi	DG	Gate of Destiny	5	for the Open the Dream Gate Championship	
110	12	January 4, 2016	Kazuchika Okada vs. Hiroshi Tanahashi	NJPW	Wrestle Kingdom 10	5	for the IWGP Heavyweight Championship	
111	13	August 6, 2016	Kazuchika Okada vs. Tomohiro Ishii	NJPW	G1 Climax 26; Night 13	5		
112	14	August 13, 2016	Kenny Omega vs. Tetsuya Naito	NJPW	G1 Climax 26; Night 18	5	Tournament simifinal	
113	15	September 3, 2016	Superkliq (Adam Cole, Matt Jackson, and Nick Jackson) vs. Matt Sydal, Ricochet, and Will Ospreay	PWG	Battle of Los Angeles; Night 2	5		
114	16	January 4, 2017	Kazuchika Okada vs. Kenny Omega	NJPW	Wrestle Kingdom 11	6	for the IWGP Heavyweight Championship	
115	17	February 11, 2017	Tetsuya Naito vs. Michael Elgin	NJPW	The New Beginning in Osaka	5	for the IWGP Intercontinental Championship	
116	18	April 9, 2017	Kazuchika Okada vs. Katsuyori Shibata	NJPW	Sakura Genesis	5	for the IWGP Heavyweight Championship	
117	19	June 3, 2017	Kushida vs. Will Ospreay	NJPW	Best of the Super Juniors; Final	5	Tournament Final	
118	20	June 11, 2017	Kazuchika Okada vs. Kenny Omega	NJPW	Dominion 6.11 in Osaka-jo Hall	6.25	for the IWGP Heavyweight Championship	
119	21	August 11, 2017	Hiroshi Tanahashi vs. Tetsuya Naito	NJPW	G1 Climax 27; Night 17	5		
120	22	August 12, 2017	Kazuchika Okada vs. Kenny Omega	NJPW	G1 Climax 27; Night 18	6	Tournament simifinal	
121	23	August 13, 2017	Tetsuya Naito vs. Kenny Omega	NJPW	G1 Climax 27; Final	5.75	Tournament final	
122	24	September 3, 2017	Donovan Dijak vs. Keith Lee	PWG	Battle of Los Angeles; Night 3	5		
123	25	October 21, 2017	Walter vs. Zack Sabre Jr.	PWG	All Star Weekend 13; Night 2	5		
124	26	January 4, 2018	Kenny Omega vs. Chris Jericho	NJPW	Wrestle Kingdom 12	5	for the IWGP United States Heavyweight Championship	
125	27	January 27, 2018	Andrade "Cien" Almas vs. Johnny Gargano	WWE	NXT TakeOver: Philadelphia	5	for the NXT Championship	
126	28	March 25, 2018	Golden Lovers (Kenny Omega and Kota Ibushi) vs. The Young Bucks (Matt Jackson and Nick Jackson)	NJPW	Strong Style Evolved	5		
127	29	April 1, 2018	Will Ospreay vs. Marty Scurll	NJPW	Sakura Genesis	5	for the IWGP Junior Heavyweight Championship	
128	30	April 7, 2018	Adam Cole vs. EC3 vs. Killian Dain vs. Lars Sullivan vs. Ricochet vs. Velveteen Dream	WWE	NXT TakeOver: New Orleans	5	Ladder match for the NXT North American Championship	
129	31	April 7, 2018	Johnny Gargano vs. Tommaso Ciampa	WWE	NXT TakeOver: New Orleans	5	Unsanctioned match	
130	32	April 14, 2018	A-Kid vs. Zack Sabre Jr.	La Triple W	Total Rumble 8	5	for the Triple W Absolute Championship	
131	33	May 4, 2018	Kazuchika Okada vs. Hiroshi Tanahashi	NJPW	Wrestling Dontaku	5.5	for the IWGP Heavyweight Championship	
132	34	June 4, 2018	Taiji Ishimori vs. Hiromu Takahashi	NJPW	Best of the Super Juniors; Final	5.5	Tournament Final	
133	35	June 9, 2018	Kazuchika Okada vs. Kenny Omega	NJPW	Dominion 6.9 in Osaka-jo Hall	7	No-time limit Two out of Three falls match for the IWGP Heavyweight Championship	
134	36	June 21, 2018	Moustache Mountain (Trent Seven and Tyler Bate) vs. The Undisputed Era (Kyle O'Reilly and Roderick Strong)	WWE	NXT	5	for the WWE NXT Tag Team Championship	
135	37	July 15, 2018	Kenny Omega vs. Tetsuya Naito	NJPW	G1 Climax 28; Night 2	5		
136	38	July 19, 2018	Hirooki Goto vs. Kenny Omega	NJPW	G1 Climax 28; Night 4	5		
137	39	July 21, 2018	Hirooki Goto vs. Tomohiro Ishii	NJPW	G1 Climax 28; Night 6	5		
138	40	August 4, 2018	Kenny Omega vs. Tomohiro Ishii	NJPW	G1 Climax 28; Night 14	5.5		
139	41	August 10, 2018	Hiroshi Tanahashi vs. Kazuchika Okada	NJPW	G1 Climax 28; Night 17	5		
140	42	August 11, 2018	Kenny Omega vs. Kota Ibushi	NJPW	G1 Climax 28; Night 18	5.5	Tournament simifinal	
141	43	August 12, 2018	Hiroshi Tanahashi vs. Kota Ibushi	NJPW	G1 Climax 28; Final	5.75	Tournament Final	
142	44	September 23, 2018	Hiroshi Tanahashi vs. Kazuchika Okada	NJPW	Destruction in Kobe	5	for the Wrestle Kingdom Championship match contract	
143	45	September 30, 2018	Chaos (Kazuchika Okada and Tomohiro Ishii) vs. Golden Lovers (Kenny Omega and Kota Ibushi)	NJPW	Fighting Spirit Unleashed	5		
144	46	December 15, 2018	Hiroshi Tanahashi and Will Ospreay vs. Golden Lovers (Kenny Omega and Kota Ibushi)	NJPW	Road to Tokyo Dome; Night 2	5		
145	47	January 4, 2019	Kenny Omega vs. Hiroshi Tanahashi	NJPW	Wrestle Kingdom 13	5.75 (Note: Originally 5.5, but later revised)	for the IWGP Heavyweight Championship	
146	48	March 24, 2019	Kazuchika Okada vs. Sanada	NJPW	New Japan Cup; Final	5	Tournament Final	
147	49	April 5, 2019	Adam Cole vs. Johnny Gargano	WWE	NXT TakeOver: New York	5.5	Two out of three falls match for the NXT Championship	
148	50	May 23, 2019	Will Ospreay vs. Bandido	NJPW	Best of the Super Juniors; Night 8	5		
149	51	May 25, 2019	Cody Rhodes vs. Dustin Rhodes	AEW	Double or Nothing	5		
150	52	June 1, 2019	Johnny Gargano vs. Adam Cole	WWE	NXT TakeOver: XXV	5.25	for the NXT Championship	
151	53	June 5, 2019	Shingo Takagi vs. Will Ospreay	NJPW	Best of the Super Juniors; Final	5.75	Tournament final	
152	54	June 9, 2019	Dragon Lee vs. Will Ospreay	NJPW	Dominion 6.9 in Osaka-jo Hall	5	for the IWGP Junior Heavyweight Championship	
153	55	July 18, 2019	Kota Ibushi vs. Will Ospreay	NJPW	G1 Climax 29; Night 5	5		
154	56	July 19, 2019	Jon Moxley vs. Tomohiro Ishii	NJPW	G1 Climax 29; Night 6	5		
155	57	July 20, 2019	Kazuchika Okada vs. Will Ospreay	NJPW	G1 Climax 29; Night 7	5.75		
156	58	July 26, 2019	Bandido, Flamita, and Rey Horus vs. Black Taurus, Laredo Kid, and Puma King	PWG	Sixteen	5		
157	59	August 3, 2019	Sanada vs. Kazuchika Okada	NJPW	G1 Climax 29; Night 13	5		
158	60	August 4, 2019	Tetsuya Naito vs. Shingo Takagi	NJPW	G1 Climax 29; Night 14	5		
159	61	August 8, 2019	Shingo Takagi vs. Tomohiro Ishii	NJPW	G1 Climax 29; Night 16	5.5		
160	62	August 10, 2019	Kota Ibushi vs. Kazuchika Okada	NJPW	G1 Climax 29; Night 17	5		
161	63	August 12, 2019	Kota Ibushi vs. Jay White	NJPW	G1 Climax 29; Final	5.5	Tournament final	
162	64	August 31, 2019	Walter vs. Tyler Bate	WWE	NXT UK TakeOver: Cardiff	5.25	for the WWE United Kingdom Championship	
163	65	August 31, 2019	Lucha Brothers (Pentagón Jr. and Rey Fenix) vs. The Young Bucks (Matt Jackson and Nick Jackson)	AEW	All Out	5.25	Ladder match for the AAA World Tag Team Championship	
164	66	September 22, 2019	Bandido vs. Dragon Lee	PWG	Battle of Los Angeles; Night 3	5		
165	67	October 26, 2019	David Starr vs. Jordan Devlin	OTT	5th Year Anniversary	5	for the OTT World Championship	

=== 2020s ===
		Date	Match	Promotion	Event	Rating	Notes	Ref.
166	1	January 4, 2020	Will Ospreay vs. Hiromu Takahashi	NJPW	Wrestle Kingdom 14; Night 1	5.5 (Note: Originally 5.25, but later revised)	for the IWGP Junior Heavyweight Championship	
167	2	January 4, 2020	Kazuchika Okada vs. Kota Ibushi	NJPW	Wrestle Kingdom 14; Night 1	5.5	for the IWGP Heavyweight Championship	
168	3	January 5, 2020	Kazuchika Okada vs. Tetsuya Naito	NJPW	Wrestle Kingdom 14; Night 2	5 (Note: Originally 4.75, but later revised)	Winner takes all match for the IWGP Heavyweight Championship and IWGP Intercontinental Championship	
169	4	February 14, 2020	Will Ospreay vs. Zack Sabre Jr.	RevPro	High Stakes	5	for the Undisputed British Heavyweight Championship	
170	5	February 29, 2020	Kenny Omega and "Hangman" Adam Page vs. The Young Bucks (Matt Jackson and Nick Jackson)	AEW	Revolution	6	for the AEW World Tag Team Championship	
171	6	September 16, 2020	Best Friends (Chuck Taylor and Trent) vs. Santana and Ortiz	AEW	Dynamite	5	Parking Lot Fight	
172	7	September 27, 2020	Shingo Takagi vs. Will Ospreay	NJPW	G1 Climax 30; Night 5	5		
173	8	October 10, 2020	Kota Ibushi vs. Minoru Suzuki	NJPW	G1 Climax 30; Night 13	5.25		
174	9	October 10, 2020	Kazuchika Okada vs. Shingo Takagi	NJPW	G1 Climax 30; Night 13	5.25		
175	10	October 29, 2020	Walter vs. Ilja Dragunov	WWE	NXT UK	5	for the WWE United Kingdom Championship	
176	11	November 7, 2020	The Young Bucks (Matt Jackson and Nick Jackson) vs. FTR (Cash Wheeler and Dax Harwood)	AEW	Full Gear	5.25	Last Chance match for the AEW World Tag Team Championship	
177	12	December 6, 2020	Go Shiozaki vs. Takashi Sugiura	Noah	The BEST ~Final Chronicle 2020~	5	for the GHC Heavyweight Championship	
178	13	January 4, 2021	Kazuchika Okada vs. Will Ospreay	NJPW	Wrestle Kingdom 15; Night 1	5.25		
179	14	January 4, 2021	Tetsuya Naito vs. Kota Ibushi	NJPW	Wrestle Kingdom 15; Night 1	5	for the IWGP Heavyweight Championship and IWGP Intercontinental Championship	
180	15	January 5, 2021	Shingo Takagi vs. Jeff Cobb	NJPW	Wrestle Kingdom 15; Night 2	5	for the NEVER Openweight Championship	
181	16	January 5, 2021	Kota Ibushi vs. Jay White	NJPW	Wrestle Kingdom 15; Night 2	5.25	for the IWGP Heavyweight Championship and IWGP Intercontinental Championship	
182	17	January 6, 2021	Kenny Omega vs. Rey Fenix	AEW	Dynamite; New Year's Smash: Night 1	5	for the AEW World Championship	
183	18	January 30, 2021	Hiroshi Tanahashi vs. Shingo Takagi	NJPW	The New Beginning in Nagoya	5	for the NEVER Openweight Championship	
184	19	March 14, 2021	Will Ospreay vs. Zack Sabre Jr.	NJPW	New Japan Cup; Night 8	5		
185	20	March 21, 2021	Will Ospreay vs. Shingo Takagi	NJPW	New Japan Cup; Night 13 (Final)	5.5	Tournament Final	
186	21	April 8, 2021	The Young Bucks (Matt Jackson and Nick Jackson) vs. Death Triangle (Pac and Rey Fenix)	AEW	Dynamite	5	for the AEW World Tag Team Championship	
187	22	May 4, 2021	Will Ospreay vs. Shingo Takagi	NJPW	Wrestling Dontaku 2021; Night 2	6	for the IWGP World Heavyweight Championship	
188	23	June 12, 2021	Syuri vs. Utami Hayashishita	Stardom	Tokyo Dream Cinderella	5.5	for the World of Stardom Championship	
189	24	July 25, 2021	Hiroshi Tanahashi vs. Shingo Takagi	NJPW	Wrestle Grand Slam in Tokyo Dome	5	for the IWGP World Heavyweight Championship	
190	25	August 22, 2021	Ilja Dragunov vs. Walter	WWE	NXT TakeOver 36	5.25	for the NXT United Kingdom Championship	
191	26	September 5, 2021	The Young Bucks (Matt Jackson and Nick Jackson) vs. Lucha Brothers (Pentagón Jr. and Rey Fenix)	AEW	All Out	5.75	Steel Cage match for the AEW World Tag Team Championship	
192	27	September 18, 2021	Tomohiro Ishii vs. Shingo Takagi	NJPW	G1 Climax 31; Night 1	5.5		
193	28	September 22, 2021	Bryan Danielson vs. Kenny Omega	AEW	Dynamite; Grand Slam: Night 1	5		
194	29	October 9, 2021	Lucha Brothers (Pentagón Jr. and Fénix) vs. Jinetes del Aire (El Hijo del Vikingo and Laredo Kid)	AAA	Héroes Inmortales XIV	5	for the AAA World Tag Team Championship	
195	30	November 13, 2021	Superkliq (Adam Cole, Matt Jackson and Nick Jackson) vs. Christian Cage and Jurassic Express (Jungle Boy and Luchasaurus)	AEW	Full Gear	5	Falls Count Anywhere match	
196	31	November 13, 2021	Kenny Omega vs. "Hangman" Adam Page	AEW	Full Gear	5.5	for the AEW World Championship	
197	32	December 15, 2021	"Hangman" Adam Page vs. Bryan Danielson	AEW	Dynamite; Winter Is Coming	5	for the AEW World Championship	
198	33	January 5, 2022	Kazuchika Okada vs. Will Ospreay	NJPW	Wrestle Kingdom 16; Night 2	5.75	for the IWGP World Heavyweight Championship	
199	34	January 26, 2022	Cody Rhodes vs. Sammy Guevara	AEW	Dynamite; Beach Break	5	Ladder match for the AEW TNT Championship	
200	35	January 29, 2022	Will Ospreay vs. Michael Oku	RevPro	High Stakes	5	for the Undisputed British Heavyweight Championship	
201	36	March 21, 2022	Will Ospreay vs. Zack Sabre Jr.	NJPW	New Japan Cup; Night 13	5		
202	37	March 26, 2022	Shingo Takagi vs. Zack Sabre Jr.	NJPW	New Japan Cup; Night 14	5		
203	38	April 1, 2022	Briscoe Brothers (Jay Briscoe and Mark Briscoe) vs. FTR (Cash Wheeler and Dax Harwood)	ROH	Supercard of Honor XV	5	for the ROH World Tag Team Championship	
204	39	May 29, 2022	Jericho Appreciation Society (Chris Jericho, Daniel Garcia, Jake Hager, Angelo Parker and Matt Menard) vs. Blackpool Combat Club (Bryan Danielson and Jon Moxley), Eddie Kingston, and Santana and Ortiz	AEW	Double or Nothing	5	Anarchy in the Arena match	
205	40	June 3, 2022	The Young Bucks (Matt Jackson and Nick Jackson) vs. Lucha Brothers (Penta Oscuro and Rey Fenix)	AEW	Rampage	5		
206	41	June 5, 2022	Cody Rhodes vs. Seth "Freakin" Rollins	WWE	Hell in a Cell	5	Hell in a Cell match	
207	42	July 23, 2022	FTR (Cash Wheeler and Dax Harwood) vs. Briscoe Brothers (Jay Briscoe and Mark Briscoe)	ROH	Death Before Dishonor	5	Two out of Three falls match for the ROH World Tag Team Championship	
208	43	August 6, 2022	Shingo Takagi vs. Will Ospreay	NJPW	G1 Climax 32; Night 12	5.5		
209	44	August 18, 2022	Kazuchika Okada vs. Will Ospreay	NJPW	G1 Climax 32; Night 20 (Final)	5.75	tournament Final	
210	45	August 21, 2022	Will Ospreay vs. Ricky Knight Jr.	RevPro	Tenth Anniversary; Night 2	5	for the Undisputed British Heavyweight Championship	
211	46	August 24, 2022	United Empire (Will Ospreay, Kyle Fletcher and Mark Davis) vs. Death Triangle (Pac, Penta El Zero M and Rey Fenix)	AEW	Dynamite	5	AEW World Trios Championship tournament match	
212	47	September 3, 2022	Gunther vs. Sheamus	WWE	Clash at the Castle	5	for the WWE Intercontinental Championship	
213	48	October 2, 2022	FTR (Cash Wheeler and Dax Harwood) vs. Aussie Open (Kyle Fletcher and Mark Davis)	NJPW	Royal Quest II; Day 1	5	for the IWGP Tag Team Championship	
214	49	October 15, 2022	Rey Fenix vs. El Hijo del Vikingo	AAA	Triplemanía XXX	5	for the AAA Mega Championship	
215	50	October 23, 2022	Laredo Kid vs. El Hijo del Vikingo	AAA	Showcenter	5	tournament final	
216	51	November 5, 2022	Will Ospreay vs. Tetsuya Naito	NJPW	Battle Autumn '22	5	for the IWGP United States Heavyweight Championship	
217	52	December 10, 2022	FTR (Cash Wheeler and Dax Harwood) vs. Briscoe Brothers (Jay Briscoe and Mark Briscoe)	ROH	Final Battle	5.5	Dog collar match for the ROH World Tag Team Championship	
218	53	December 19, 2022	Shingo Takagi vs. Taichi	JTO	50th Anniversary for TAKATaichi Together	5	Last Man Standing Lumberjack match for the NJPW King Of Pro-Wrestling Championship	
219	54	January 4, 2023	Will Ospreay vs. Kenny Omega	NJPW	Wrestle Kingdom 17; Night 1	6.25	for the IWGP United States Heavyweight Championship	
220	55	January 11, 2023	Death Triangle (Pac, Penta El Zero M and Rey Fenix) vs. The Elite (Kenny Omega, Matt Jackson and Nick Jackson)	AEW	Dynamite	5	Ladder match for the AEW World Trios Championship	
221	56	March 5, 2023	"Hangman" Adam Page vs. Jon Moxley	AEW	Revolution	5	Texas Death match	
222	57	March 5, 2023	MJF vs. Bryan Danielson	AEW	Revolution	5.75	60-minute Iron Man match for the AEW World Championship	
223	58	March 22, 2023	Kenny Omega vs. El Hijo del Vikingo	AEW	Dynamite	5		
224	59	April 1, 2023	Kevin Owens and Sami Zayn vs. The Usos (Jey Uso and Jimmy Uso)	WWE	WrestleMania 39; Night 1	5	for the Undisputed WWE Tag Team Championship	
225	60	April 2, 2023	Gunther vs. Drew McIntyre vs. Sheamus	WWE	WrestleMania 39; Night 2	5	for the WWE Intercontinental Championship	
226	61	April 2, 2023	Shingo Takagi vs. Aaron Henare	NJPW	Road to Sakura Genesis	5.25	"Ultimate Triad" match for the NJPW King Of Pro-Wrestling Championship	
227	62	May 28, 2023	Master Wato vs. Titán	NJPW	Best of the Super Juniors; Finals	5	Tournament Final	
228	63	May 28, 2023	Blackpool Combat Club (Jon Moxley, Bryan Danielson, Claudio Castagnoli and Wheeler Yuta) vs. The Elite (Kenny Omega, Matt Jackson, Nick Jackson and "Hangman" Adam Page)	AEW	Double or Nothing	5	Anarchy in the Arena match	
229	64	June 4, 2023	Blackpool Combat Club (Jon Moxley and Claudio Castagnoli) and Shota Umino vs. Chaos (Kazuchika Okada and Tomohiro Ishii) and Hiroshi Tanahashi	NJPW	Dominion 6.4 in Osaka-jo Hall	5	for the NEVER Openweight 6-Man Tag Team Championship	
230	65	June 25, 2023	Kenny Omega vs. Will Ospreay	AEW/NJPW	Forbidden Door	6	for the IWGP United States Heavyweight Championship	
231	66	July 15, 2023	Kento Miyahara vs. Katsuhiko Nakajima	Noah	One Night Dream	5.25		
232	67	July 15, 2023	FTR (Cash Wheeler and Dax Harwood) vs. Bullet Club Gold (Jay White and Juice Robinson)	AEW	Collision	5.25	Two out of Three falls match for the AEW World Tag Team Championship	
233	68	August 12, 2023	Tetsuya Naito vs. Will Ospreay	NJPW	G1 Climax 33; Night 18	6	Tournament simifinal	
234	69	August 13, 2023	Tetsuya Naito vs. Kazuchika Okada	NJPW	G1 Climax 33; Night 19	5.25	Tournament Final	
235	70	August 26, 2023	Will Ospreay vs. Shingo Takagi	RevPro	11th Anniversary	5		
236	71	September 3, 2023	Bryan Danielson vs. Ricky Starks	AEW	All Out	5	No Disqualification Strap match	
237	72	September 3, 2023	Kenny Omega vs. Konosuke Takeshita	AEW	All Out	5		
238	73	September 24, 2023	Will Ospreay vs. Yota Tsuji	NJPW	Destruction in Kobe	5	for the IWGP United Kingdom Heavyweight Championship	
239	74	October 1, 2023	Bryan Danielson vs. Zack Sabre Jr.	AEW	WrestleDream	5.5		
240	75	October 14, 2023	Will Ospreay vs. Zack Sabre Jr.	NJPW	Royal Quest III	5.5	for the IWGP United Kingdom Heavyweight Championship	
241	76	October 21, 2023	"Speedball" Mike Bailey vs. Will Ospreay	Impact	Bound for Glory	5.25		
242	77	November 4, 2023	Will Ospreay vs. Shota Umino	NJPW	Power Struggle	5.75	for the IWGP United States Heavyweight Championship	
243	78	November 5, 2023	Katsuhiko Nakajima vs. Yuma Aoyagi	AJPW	Giant Series 2023: Hokkaido Edition; Day 6 (Evening Show)	5.25	for the Triple Crown Heavyweight Championship	
244	79	November 18, 2023	Swerve Strickland vs. "Hangman" Adam Page	AEW	Full Gear	5	Texas Death match	
245	80	December 31, 2023	Katsuhiko Nakajima vs. Kento Miyahara	AJPW	ManiaX	5.25	for the Triple Crown Heavyweight Championship	
246	82	January 4, 2024	Kazuchika Okada vs. Bryan Danielson	NJPW	Wrestle Kingdom 18	5.25		
247	83	January 5, 2024	Máscara Dorada vs. Templario	CMLL	Super Viernes	5	Two out of Three falls match	
248	84	January 13, 2024	Jon Moxley vs. Shingo Takagi	NJPW	Battle in the Valley	5	No Disqualification match	
249	85	January 13, 2024	Kazuchika Okada vs. Will Ospreay	NJPW	Battle in the Valley	5		
250	86	January 14, 2024	Josh Alexander vs. Will Ospreay	TNA	Impact!	5.5		
251	87	February 11, 2024	Zack Sabre Jr. vs. Bryan Danielson	NJPW	The New Beginning in Osaka	5.5		
252	88	February 18, 2024	Michael Oku vs. Will Ospreay	RevPro	High Stakes	6	for the Undisputed British Heavyweight Championship	
253	89	March 3, 2024	Will Ospreay vs. Konosuke Takeshita	AEW	Revolution	5.75		
254	90	March 6, 2024	Will Ospreay vs. Kyle Fletcher	AEW	Dynamite	5		
255	91	April 21, 2024	Will Ospreay vs. Bryan Danielson	AEW	Dynasty	6.5		
256	92	May 4, 2024	Cody Rhodes vs. AJ Styles	WWE	Backlash	5	for the Undisputed WWE Championship	
257	93	May 22, 2024	Masa Kitamiya vs. Tomohiro Ishii	Noah	One Night Dream 2	5		
258	94	June 22, 2024	Hechicero vs. Zack Sabre Jr.	CMLL	Sabados de Coliseo	5	Two out of Three falls match	
259	95	June 30, 2024	Swerve Strickland vs. Will Ospreay	AEW/NJPW	Forbidden Door	5.5	for the AEW World Championship	
260	96	July 17, 2024	MJF vs. Will Ospreay	AEW	Dynamite; 250	5.75	for the AEW International Championship	
261	97	August 7, 2024	Konosuke Takeshita vs. El Phantasmo	NJPW	G1 Climax 34; Night 12	5		
262	98	August 25, 2024	Will Ospreay vs. MJF	AEW	All In	5	for the AEW International Championship	
263	99	August 25, 2024	Bryan Danielson vs. Swerve Strickland	AEW	All In	5.25	Title vs. Career match for the AEW World Championship	
264	100	September 7, 2024	Will Ospreay vs. Pac	AEW	All Out	5.5	for the AEW International Championship	
265	101	October 5, 2024	CM Punk vs. Drew McIntyre	WWE	Bad Blood	5	Hell in a Cell match	
266	102	October 12, 2024	Konosuke Takeshita vs. Will Ospreay vs. Ricochet	AEW	WrestleDream	5.5	for the AEW International Championship	
267	103	October 19, 2024	Konosuke Takeshita vs. "Speedball" Mike Bailey	MLP	Forged in Excellence; Night 1	5		
268	104	November 4, 2024	Zack Sabre Jr. vs. Shingo Takagi	NJPW	Power Struggle	5.25	for the IWGP World Heavyweight Championship	
269	105	November 23, 2024	Kyle Fletcher vs. Will Ospreay	AEW	Full Gear	5.25		
270	106	December 18, 2024	Darby Allin vs. Will Ospreay	AEW	Dynamite; Holiday Bash	5	2024 Continental Classic match	
271	107	December 28, 2024	Will Ospreay vs. Kyle Fletcher	AEW	Worlds End	5	2024 Continental Classic semifinal	
272	108	December 28, 2024	Kazuchika Okada vs. Will Ospreay	AEW	Worlds End	5.25	2024 Continental Classic final	
273	109	January 5, 2025	Kenny Omega vs. Gabe Kidd	AEW/CMLL/NJPW/ROH/Stardom	Wrestle Dynasty	5.25		
274	110	February 2, 2025	Cosmic Angels (Saori Anou, Tam Nakano and Natsupoi) vs. Neo Genesis (AZM, Starlight Kid and Miyu Amasaki)	Stardom	Supreme Fight	5	for the Artist of Stardom Championship	
275	111	February 11, 2025	Yota Tsuji vs. Gabe Kidd	NJPW	The New Beginning in Osaka	5	for the IWGP Global Heavyweight Championship	
276	112	February 15, 2025	Kenny Omega and Will Ospreay vs. Don Callis Family (Konosuke Takeshita and Kyle Fletcher)	AEW	Grand Slam Australia	5		
277	113	March 1, 2025	Kevin Owens vs. Sami Zayn	WWE	Elimination Chamber	5	Unsanctioned match	
278	114	March 3, 2025	Saya Kamitani vs. Tam Nakano	Stardom	Stardom Nighter in Korakuen	5	Loser Leaves Stardom Match	
279	115	March 9, 2025	Toni Storm vs. Mariah May	AEW	Revolution	5	"Hollywood Ending" match for the AEW Women's World Championship	
280	116	March 9, 2025	Kenny Omega vs. Konosuke Takeshita	AEW	Revolution	5	for the AEW International Championship	
281	117	March 9, 2025	Will Ospreay vs. Kyle Fletcher	AEW	Revolution	5	Cage match	
282	118	April 16, 2025	Will Ospreay vs. Konosuke Takeshita	AEW	Dynamite; Spring BreakThru	5.5	Owen Hart Cup semi-final	
283	119	April 20, 2025	Iyo Sky vs. Rhea Ripley vs. Bianca Belair	WWE	WrestleMania 41; Night 2	5	for the Women's World Championship	
284	120	April 25, 2025	Street Profits (Angelo Dawkins and Montez Ford) vs. DIY (Johnny Gargano and Tommaso Ciampa) vs. Motor City Machine Guns (Alex Shelley and Chris Sabin)	WWE	SmackDown	5	Tables, ladders & chairs match for the WWE Tag Team Championship	
285	121	April 27, 2025	Saya Kamitani vs. Tam Nakano	Stardom	All Star Grand Queendom	5.25	Career vs. Career match for the World of Stardom Championship	
286	122	May 25, 2025	Kenny Omega, Willow Nightingale, Swerve Strickland and The Opps (Samoa Joe, Powerhouse Hobbs and Katsuyori Shibata) vs. Death Riders (Jon Moxley, Claudio Castagnoli, Marina Shafir and Wheeler Yuta) and The Young Bucks (Matthew Jackson and Nicholas Jackson)	AEW	Double or Nothing	5	Anarchy in the Arena match	
287	123	May 25, 2025	"Hangman" Adam Page vs. Will Ospreay	AEW	Double or Nothing	5.5	Owen Hart Cup final	
288	124	June 1, 2025	Kosei Fujita vs. Yoh	NJPW	Best of the Super Juniors; Finals	5.25	Tournament Final	
289	125	June 11, 2025	Will Ospreay vs. Swerve Strickland	AEW	Dynamite; Summer Blockbuster	5.25		
290	126	June 17, 2025	Bandido vs. Máscara Dorada	AEW/CMLL/ROH	CMLL vs. AEW & ROH	5	for the ROH World Championship	
291	127	June 20, 2025	Bandido and Hologram vs. El Sky Team (Místico and Máscara Dorada)	CMLL	Fantastica Mania: Mexico	5		
292	128	June 21, 2025	Sareee vs. Syuri	Stardom	Stardom The Conversion 2025	5.25	for the IWGP Women's Championship	
293	129	July 6, 2025	Taichi vs. Tomohiro Ishii	NJPW	New Japan Soul; Day 9	5	Final competitors in a 4-man gauntlet match to determine the final G1 Climax 35 entrant, also featuring Chase Owens and Satoshi Kojima	
294	130	July 11, 2025	Bandido vs. Konosuke Takeshita	ROH	Supercard of Honor	5.75	for the ROH World Championship	
295	131	July 12, 2025	Will Ospreay and Swerve Strickland vs. The Young Bucks (Matthew Jackson and Nicholas Jackson)	AEW	All In: Texas	5.5	EVP powers vs World Title contendership	
296	132	July 12, 2025	"Hangman" Adam Page vs. Jon Moxley	AEW	All In: Texas	5.5	Texas Death match for the AEW World Championship	
297	133	July 25, 2025	Neón vs. Máscara Dorada	CMLL	Leyenda de Plata	5	tournament final	
298	134	July 31, 2025	Kyle Fletcher vs. Dustin Rhodes	AEW	Collision	5	Street Fight for the AEW TNT Championship	
299	135	August 3, 2025	Cody Rhodes vs. John Cena	WWE	SummerSlam; Night 2	5	Street Fight for the Undisputed WWE Championship	
300	136	August 24, 2025	Will Ospreay, Hiroshi Tanahashi, Darby Allin and Golden Lovers (Kenny Omega and Kota Ibushi) vs. Death Riders (Jon Moxley and Claudio Castagnoli), Gabe Kidd and The Young Bucks (Matt Jackson and Nick Jackson)	AEW/NJPW	Forbidden Door	5	Lights Out Steel Cage match	
301	137	August 29, 2025	Bandido vs. Hechicero	ROH	Death Before Dishonor	5.5	for the ROH World Championship	
302	138	August 29, 2025	Team Mexico (Ángel de Oro, Atlantis Jr., Difunto, Máscara Dorada, Neón, Místico, Templario, Titán, Volador Jr. and Zandokan Jr.) vs. Team International (Action Andretti, "Speedball" Mike Bailey, Donovan Dijak, Taiji Ishimori, The Beast Mortos, Michael Oku, Rocky Romero, Lio Rush, TJP and Robbie X)	CMLL	International Gran Prix	5	Torneo cibernetico	
303	139	September 19, 2025	Místico vs. MJF	CMLL	92nd Anniversary Show	5.5	Lucha de Apuestas Title vs. Mask match for the CMLL World Light Heavyweight Championship	
304	140	September 20, 2025	Kazuchika Okada vs. Konosuke Takeshita vs. Máscara Dorada	AEW	All Out	5.25	for the AEW Unified Championship	
305	141	September 20, 2025	"Hangman" Adam Page vs. Kyle Fletcher	AEW	All Out	5.25	for the AEW World Championship	
306	142	October 13, 2025	Konosuke Takeshita vs. Zack Sabre Jr.	NJPW	King of Pro-Wrestling	5.5	for the IWGP World Heavyweight Championship	
307	143	October 18, 2025	Brodido (Bandido and Brody King) vs. Don Callis Family (Kazuchika Okada and Konosuke Takeshita)	AEW	WrestleDream	5	for the AEW World Tag Team Championship	
308	144	November 12, 2025	Darby Allin and The Conglomeration (Mark Briscoe, Orange Cassidy, Kyle O'Reilly, and Roderick Strong) vs. Death Riders (Jon Moxley, Claudio Castagnoli, Daniel Garcia, Pac and Wheeler Yuta)	AEW	Dynamite; Blood and Guts	5	Blood and Guts match	
309	145	November 22, 2025	FTR (Dax Harwood and Cash Wheeler) vs. Brodido (Bandido and Brody King)	AEW	Full Gear	5	for the AEW World Tag Team Championship	
310	146	November 22, 2025	Mark Briscoe vs. Kyle Fletcher	AEW	Full Gear	5	No Disqualification match for the AEW TNT Championship	
311	147	November 23, 2025	Máscara Dorada vs. Komander	CMLL	Domingo Familiar	5	for the World Historic Welterweight Championship	
312	148	December 10, 2025	"Speedball" Mike Bailey vs. Kyle Fletcher	AEW	Dynamite; Winter Is Coming	5.25	2025 Continental Classic match	
313	149	December 27, 2025	Kyle Fletcher vs. Jon Moxley	AEW	Worlds End	5	2025 Continental Classic semifinal	
314	150	January 4, 2026	Konosuke Takeshita vs. Yota Tsuji	NJPW	Wrestle Kingdom 20	5	Winner takes all match for the IWGP World Heavyweight Championship and IWGP Global Heavyweight Championship	
315	151	January 4, 2026	Hiroshi Tanahashi vs. Kazuchika Okada	NJPW	Wrestle Kingdom 20	6	Tanahashi's Retirement match	
316	152	January 19, 2026	Shota Umino and Yuya Uemura vs. Tomohiro Ishii and Taichi	NJPW	Road to The New Beginning	5.25	IWGP Tag Team Championship #1 contendership	
317	153	February 18, 2026	Swerve Strickland vs. Kenny Omega	AEW	Dynamite	5.25		
318	154	February 25, 2026	Jack Perry, The Rascalz (Dezmond Xavier & Zachary Wentz), and The Young Bucks (Matt Jackson and Nick Jackson) vs. FTR (Dax Harwood & Cash Wheeler) and The Demand (Ricochet and Gates of Agony (Bishop Kaun and Toa Liona))	AEW	Dynamite	5	"Mile High Madness" Anything Goes match	
319	155	March 11, 2026	Kyle Fletcher vs. "Speedball" Mike Bailey	AEW	Dynamite	5	for the AEW TNT Championship	
320	156	March 15, 2026	FTR (Dax Harwood and Cash Wheeler) vs. The Young Bucks (Matt Jackson and Nick Jackson)	AEW	Revolution	5.5	for the AEW World Tag Team Championship	
321	157	March 15, 2026	Jon Moxley vs. Konosuke Takeshita	AEW	Revolution	5	No-time limit match for the AEW Continental Championship	
322	158	March 15, 2026	Andrade El Idolo vs. Bandido	AEW	Revolution	5		
323	159	March 21, 2026	Callum Newman vs. Yuya Uemura	NJPW	New Japan Cup; Final	5.25		
324	160	April 3, 2026	Místico and JetSpeed (Kevin Knight & “Speedball” Mike Bailey) vs. Hechicero, Volador Jr., and El Clon	CMLL	Super Viernes	5		
325	161	April 12, 2026	The Young Bucks (Matt Jackson and Nick Jackson) vs. Don Callis Family (Kazuchika Okada and Konosuke Takeshita)	AEW	Dynasty	5		
326	162	April 19, 2026	CM Punk vs. Roman Reigns	WWE	WrestleMania 42; Night 2	5	for the World Heavyweight Championship	
327	163	April 22, 2026	Darby Allin vs. Tommaso Ciampa	AEW	Dynamite	5	for the AEW World Championship	
328	164	May 13, 2026	Darby Allin vs. Konosuke Takeshita	AEW	Dynamite	5	for the AEW World Championship	
329	165	May 24, 2026	Adam Copeland and Christian Cage vs. FTR (Dax Harwood and Cash Wheeler)	AEW	Double or Nothing	5	New York Street Fight "I Quit" match for the AEW World Tag Team Championship	
330	166	May 24, 2026	Kazuchika Okada vs. Konosuke Takeshita	AEW	Double or Nothing	5	for the AEW International Championship	
331	167	May 29, 2026	Bandido, Noisy Boy, Spider Fly and Zonik vs. Gringo Loco, Vengador, Iron Kid and Turbo	Riot Lucha Libre	Lo Mismo Pero Sin Cambios	5.25		
332	168	May 30, 2026	El Grande Americano vs. "The Original" El Grande Americano	AAA/WWE	Noche de Los Grandes; Week 1	5.75	No Disqualification Lucha de Apuestas Mask vs. Mask match	
333	169	June 28, 2026	Team Briscoe (The Conglomeration (Mark Briscoe, Orange Cassidy, Kyle O'Reilly and Roderick Strong), Darby Allin and Konosuke Takeshita) vs. Team DCMJF (MJF and Don Callis Family (Kevin Knight, Andrade El Idolo, Kyle Fletcher, Kazuchika Okada and Jake Doyle))	AEW/NJPW/Stardom/CMLL	Forbidden Door	5	Death's Door Steel Cage match	
334	170	June 28, 2026	Will Ospreay vs. Swerve Strickland	AEW/NJPW/Stardom/CMLL	Forbidden Door	5.5	Owen Hart Cup final	
335	171	July 8, 2026	MJF vs. Kenny Omega	AEW	Dynamite; Beach Break	5.5	Last Chance match for the AEW World Championship	
336	172	July 18, 2026	Syuri vs. Natsupoi	Stardom	5 Star Grand Prix; Night 1	5	for the IWGP Women's Championship	
337	173	July 19, 2026	Yuya Uemura vs. Zack Sabre Jr.	NJPW	G1 Climax 36; Night 3	5		
338	174	July 26, 2026	The Young Bucks (Matt Jackson and Nick Jackson) vs. Death Riders (Jon Moxley and Will Ospreay)	AEW	Redemption	5		
339	175	July 26, 2026	Kyle Fletcher vs. Bandido	AEW	Redemption	5	for the AEW International Championship	
340	176	July 31, 2026	Máscara Dorada vs. Komander	CMLL	Leyenda de Plata 2026	5	Leyenda de Plata Final	
341	177	August 2, 2026	Gabe Kidd vs. Henare	NJPW	G1 Climax 36; Night 11	5		
342	178	August 7, 2026	Team Mexico (Hechicero, Ángel de Oro, Bárbaro Cavernario, Máscara Dorada, Místico, Soberano Jr., Templario, Titán, Último Guerrero, Volador Jr. and Xelhua) vs. Team World (Austin Aries, Bandido, Blake Christian, Claudio Castagnoli, Douki, Leon Cage, Orange Cassidy, Pac, Roderick Strong, Rohan Raja and Yujiro Takahashi)	CMLL	International Gran Prix 2026	5	International Gran Prix	
343	179	August 8, 2026	Sareee vs. Mio Momono	Marvelous	Korakuen Hall Show	5		
344	180	August 16, 2026	Yuya Uemura vs. Ryohei Oiwa	NJPW	G1 Climax 36; Final	5.5	Tournament Final	
345	181	August 23, 2026	Rina vs. Starlight Kid	Stardom	5 Star Grand Prix; Night 16	5	Tournament final	
346	182	August 30, 2026	Mercedes Moné vs. Willow Nightingale	AEW	All In	5	for the AEW Women's World Championship	
347	183	August 30, 2026	Will Ospreay vs. Kenny Omega	AEW	All In	6.5	for the AEW World Championship	
348	184	September 13, 2026	Rey Fénix vs. Jack Cartwheel vs. Mini Vikingo vs. Nathan Frazer	AAA/WWE	Triplemanía 34; Night 2	5.25	Fatal four-way match for the AAA World Cruiserweight Championship	
349	185	September 26, 2026	Swerve Strickland and The New Level (Austin Creed and Kofi) vs. "Hangman" Adam Page and Brodido (Brody King and Bandido)	AEW	All Out	5	for the AEW World Trios Championship	
350	186	September 26, 2026	The Young Bucks (Matt Jackson and Nick Jackson) vs. Adam Copeland and Christian Cage vs. FTR (Dax Harwood and Cash Wheeler)	AEW	All Out	5	Ladder match for the AEW World Tag Team Championship	
351	187	September 30, 2026	Will Ospreay vs. Ricochet	AEW	Dynamite; A Tribute to Pac	5		
352	188	October 6, 2026	Kazuchika Okada vs. Will Ospreay	AEW	Grand Slam France	5	for the AEW World Championship	
353	189	October 12, 2026	Yota Tsuji vs. Ryohei Oiwa	NJPW	King of Pro-Wrestling	5.5	for the IWGP Heavyweight Championship	
354	190	October 17, 2026	The Young Bucks (Matt and Nick Jackson) vs. Don Callis Family (Kevin Knight and Kyle Fletcher)	AEW	WrestleDream	5.5	for the AEW World Tag Team Championship	
355	191	November 3, 2026	Gabe Kidd vs. Taichi	NJPW	Power Struggle	5.25	for the IWGP Global Heavyweight Championship	
356	192	November 14, 2026	The Young Bucks (Matt and Nick Jackson) vs. Mark Davis and Jake Doyle	AEW	Full Gear	5	for the AEW World Tag Team Championship	
357	193	November 14, 2026	Will Ospreay vs. Kyle Fletcher	AEW	Full Gear	5.25	for the AEW World Championship	

== By wrestlers ==
As of November 22, 2026.

Rank	Wrestler	Total No. of 5★+ matches	No. of matches over 5★	Highest rating
1	Will Ospreay	60	32	6.5
2	Kazuchika Okada	35	16	7
3	Kenny Omega	33	16	7
4	Mitsuharu Misawa	26	0	5
5	Kenta Kobashi	24	0	5
6	The Young Bucks	21	7	6
6	Toshiaki Kawada	21	0	5
8	Shingo Takagi	19	9	6
9	Konosuke Takeshita	18	6	5.75
9	Hiroshi Tanahashi	18	4	6

== By promotions ==
As of November 22, 2026.

Rank	Promotion	Abbreviation	Total No. of 5★+ matches	No. of matches over 5★	Highest rating
1	New Japan Pro-Wrestling	NJPW	112	47	7
2	All Elite Wrestling	AEW	86	33	6.5
3	All Japan Pro Wrestling	AJPW	38	2	5.25
4	World Wrestling Federation / World Wrestling Entertainment	WWF/WWE	27	6	5.75
5	All Japan Women's Pro-Wrestling	AJW	19	0	5
6	Ring of Honor	ROH	11	4	5.75
7	Consejo Mundial de Lucha Libre	CMLL	11	2	5.5
8	World Wonder Ring Stardom	Stardom	8	4	5.5
9	Asistencia Asesoría y Administración / AAA	AAA	8	2	5.75
10	World Championship Wrestling	WCW	7	1	6

== See also ==
- Professional wrestling in Australia
- Professional wrestling in Canada
- Professional wrestling in Japan
- Professional wrestling in Mexico
- Professional wrestling in New Zealand
- Professional wrestling in the United Kingdom
- Professional wrestling in the United States
- Professional wrestling match types
