= Into The Fight 2021 =

2021 DDT Pro-Wrestling event

- Promotional poster featuring most of the participants
- Promotion: DDT Pro-Wrestling
- Date: February 28, 2021
- City: Tokyo, Japan
- Venue: Korakuen Hall
- Attendance: 584
- Tagline: If you want to see pro-wrestling, DDT!

Event chronology
← Previous; Kawasaki Strong 2021	Next → Judgment 2021

Into The Fight chronology
← Previous; 2020	Next → 2023

Into The Fight 2021 was a professional wrestling event promoted by DDT Pro-Wrestling (DDT). It took place on February 28, 2021, in Tokyo, Japan, at Korakuen Hall. The event aired live on Fighting TV Samurai and on DDT's streaming service Wrestle Universe.

== Production ==
Other on-screen personnel
Role:	Name:
Commentators	Sayoko Mita
Commentators	Haruo Murata
Commentators	Kagehiro Osano
Ring announcers	Inoue Mic
Ring announcers	Kazunori Kosuge
Referees	Yukinori Matsui
Referees	Daisuke Kiso

=== Background ===
Into The Fight is an event held each year since 2005 (except in 2006) at Korakuen Hall (except the 2015 edition which was held at Shinjuku Face). The 2021 edition was the sixteenth event under that name.

Due to the COVID-19 pandemic, the show only had an attendance of 584 people whereas the previous editions held at Korakuen Hall generally attracted around 1,500 people.

The official theme song of the event was "Shut Up and Dance" by Walk the Moon.

=== Storylines ===
The show featured six professional wrestling matches that resulted from scripted storylines, where wrestlers portrayed villains, heroes, or less distinguishable characters in the scripted events that built tension and culminated in a wrestling match or series of matches.

On February 7, 2021, Shunma Katsumata won his first DDT Extreme Division Championship title from Sanshiro Takagi in a three-way Falls Count Anywhere 45-minute Iron Man match also involving Batten×Burabura. He then immediately named Mao as his first challenger and the match was made official later that day.

On July 25, 2020, Yoshihiko brought its Ironman Heavymetalweight Championship to Game Changer Wrestling (GCW) in the United States. Joey Janela won the championship from Yoshihiko which initiated a series of quick title changes between various GCW wrestlers due to the championship's 24/7 rule. The title then went to All Elite Wrestling (AEW) when Dean Malenko submitted Janela in a backstage segment filmed for Twitter. The title eventually went to Britt Baker who lost it to a copy of The Young Bucks' autobiography "Killing the Business" when the book fell on top of Baker after she fell asleep reading it. On February 9, 2021, DDT announced a five-way match for the title with Kazuki Hirata, Danshoku Dino, Antonio Honda and Saki Akai as challengers.

== Event ==
=== Preliminary matches ===
In the opening match, Yusuke Okada and Toui Kojima defeated Yuki Ueno and Keigo Nakamura when Okada performed his newly named "Tricolor" tornado DDT on Ueno, earning him the pinfall victory.

Next, the Ironman Heavymetalweight Championship was being defended in a five-way match. The 1,498th champion heading into the match was a copy of The Young Bucks' autobiography "Killing the Business" and the challengers were Kazuki Hirata, Danshoku Dino, Antonio Honda and Saki Akai. The match had a 10-minute time limit and the first to pin the book would win and be declared the new champion. The challengers all fought each other trying to cover the book. Hirata eventually went backstage looking for something that would help him defeat the champion. Rummaging through the belongings of Gota Ihashi, he found a copy of "Lip Hip Shake", the first photobook of Akai from 2006. Hirata used the photobook as a weapon and tried to show its content to the audience while Akai frantically tried to hide it from view. In the end, every wrestler was knocked down and the photobook fell on top of The Young Bucks' autobiography. Referee Yukinori Matsui counted it as a pin and declared the photobook winner of both the match and the title.

Kazuki Hirata then congratulated the new champion before executing the "Viagra Driver" (a pumphandle version of the "Michinoku Driver II") to try and pin it. The book kicked out at two and retaliated by hitting Hirata in the head and knocking him down with a huracánrana. Gota Ihashi then ran down to the ring, grabbed the photobook and fled.

In the third match, Harashima, Toru Owashi and Yukio Naya faced Damnation (Daisuke Sasaki, Mad Paulie and Nobuhiro Shimatani). The match concluded when Shimatani tried to hit Harashima with "Somato", Harashima's own finisher. Harashima countered the attempt and executed two "Somato" of his own to pin Shimatani. Though Sasaki and Paulie were in position to break up the pin, they chose not to do so, visibly taken aback by Shimatani's plan.

Next, Damnation (Tetsuya Endo, Soma Takao and Yuji Hino) faced All Out (Konosuke Takeshita, Akito and Yuki Iino). Iino, eager to fight Hino, went for a "Diving Hip Drop" but he was stopped by Hino. Endo tried to hit Iino with a powerbomb, but he collapsed under Iino's weight. Finally, Takao performed the "Official Endless Waltz" (a rolling arm wrench inside cradle) on Iino for the pinfall victory.

After the match, Akito called the entire All Out stable into the ring to give a speech. He announced he had thought long about the future of All Out now that Iino was back from his injury. He pointed out that each member of the stable had bigger personal objectives: Iino was going after Yuji Hino, Takeshita and Shunma Katsumata had their new DDT Sauna Club stable, Katsumata also had the DDT Extreme Division title to defend, and Akito had the KO-D 6-Man Tag Team title to defend. For all these reasons, Akito proposed that All Out disbanded. Everyone agreed that they had all grown out of the stable, and General Manager Hisaya Imabayashi agreed to schedule a special farewell show on March 12.

Next, in what was a preview of the Judgement 2021: DDT 24th Anniversary main event, Junretsu (Jun Akiyama, Makoto Oishi and Hideki Okatani) faced Kazusada Higuchi, Yukio Sakaguchi and Chris Brookes. Higuchi targeted Akiyama throughout the match until he was able to apply a clawhold on him. Akiyama rolled out of the ring to escape the hold, but Higuchi was able to maintain it. Meanwhile, Brookes hit Okatani with the "Praying Mantis Bomb" to win the match. Sakaguchi separated Higuchi from Akiyama who had to be helped to the back.

In a backstage interview, Akiyama complimented Higuchi on his strength and his determination while also expressing frustration for the loss.

=== Main event ===
The main event was a deathmatch with special rules dubbed the "Kids Room Deathmatch 37 (Sauna) Count Edition" (キーズルームデスマッチ・37（サウナ）カウントエディション, kīzu rūmu desumatchi sauna kaunto edishon) in which Shunma Katsumata defended the DDT Extreme Division Championship against Mao. Toys such as Lego bricks, a miniature train and kid size furniture were displayed in the ring. The match had no disqualification or rope breaks, every object inside the ring was legal and any weapon introduced by the wrestlers was legal if referee Matsui deemed it "kid safe". The goal of the match was to pin the opponent for a cumulative 37-count (in Japanese, "37" can be read in a way that sounds like "sauna", in reference to the DDT Sauna Club stable of which Katsumata and Mao were both members). Katsumata convinced referee Matsui that he used to play with cinder blocks as a child in order to drop one on Mao. Both traded 2-count pinfalls in an intense bout that saw its conclusion when Katsumata donned a barbed wire laced apron and climbed the top turnbuckle for a diving splash. Mao rolled out of the way but Katsumata caught him in a cradle to get the 37th count and retain his title.

After the match, Chris Brookes cordially challenged Katsumata for the title. Katsumata accepted and Brookes attacked him.

== Results ==
No.	Results	Stipulations	Times
1	Yusuke Okada and Toui Kojima defeated Yuki Ueno and Keigo Nakamura	Tag team match	9:22
2	Saki Akai's photo book "Lip Hip Shake" defeated The Young Bucks' autobiography "Killing the Business" (c), Kazuki Hirata, Danshoku Dino, Antonio Honda and Saki Akai (Note: Kazuki Hirata introduced the photo book while the match was in progress, making it a six-way.)	Six-way match for the Ironman Heavymetalweight Championship (Note: Although the match was not advertised as such, it was also technically for the Revolution in Eastern Wrestling (REW) Pakistan 24/7 Championship.)	9:09
3	Disaster Box (Harashima and Toru Owashi) and Yukio Naya defeated Damnation (Daisuke Sasaki, Mad Paulie and Nobuhiro Shimatani)	Six-man tag team match	9:27
4	Damnation (Tetsuya Endo, Soma Takao and Yuji Hino) defeated All Out (Konosuke Takeshita, Akito and Yuki Iino)	Six-man tag team match	15:17
5	Eruption (Kazusada Higuchi and Yukio Sakaguchi) and Chris Brookes defeated Junretsu (Jun Akiyama, Makoto Oishi and Hideki Okatani)	Six-man tag team match	12:07
6	Shunma Katsumata (c) defeated Mao 37–36	Kids Room Deathmatch 37 (Sauna) Count Edition for the DDT Extreme Division Championship	21:59
(c) / – the champion(s) heading into the match
