= Judgement 2021: DDT 24th Anniversary =

2021 DDT Pro-Wrestling event

- Official poster for the event featuring Jun Akiyama and Kazusada Higuchi
- Promotion: CyberFight
- Brand: DDT Pro-Wrestling
- Date: March 28, 2021
- City: Tokyo, Japan
- Venue: Korakuen Hall
- Attendance: 669

Event chronology
← Previous; Into The Fight 2021	Next → Peter Pan 2021

Judgement chronology
← Previous; 2020	Next → 2022

Judgement 2021: DDT 24th Anniversary (Judgement2021〜DDT旗揚げ24周年記念大会〜, Judgement 2021: DDT hataage 24 shūnen kinen taikai) was a professional wrestling event promoted by CyberFight's DDT Pro-Wrestling (DDT). It took place on March 28, 2021, in Tokyo, Japan, at the Korakuen Hall . It was the twenty-fifth event under the Judgement name. The event aired domestically on Fighting TV Samurai and globally on DDT's video-on-demand service Wrestle Universe.

== Production ==
Other on-screen personnel
Role:	Name:
Commentators	Sayoko Mita
Commentators	Haruo Murata
Commentators	Kagehiro Osano
Ring announcers	Kazunori Kosuge
Ring announcers	Ken Kato
Referees	Yukinori Matsui
Referees	Daisuke Kiso

=== Background ===
DDT held its inaugural event, entitled Judgement, on March 25, 1997. The next year DDT held Judgement 2, starting the annual tradition of the Judgement Anniversary shows that have been held each year, most commonly in March. Over the years, Judgement would become the biggest show of the year until 2009 when the Peter Pan event series started and took that spot.

The theme song of the event was "Welcome to the Black Parade" by My Chemical Romance.

=== Storylines ===
Judgement 2021 featured seven professional wrestling matches that involved different wrestlers from pre-existing scripted feuds and storylines. Wrestlers portrayed villains, heroes, or less distinguishable characters in the scripted events that built tension and culminated in a wrestling match or series of matches.

On December 27, 2020, Jun Akiyama defeated Konosuke Takeshita in the final of the D-Oh Grand Prix 2021 and thus became the number one contender to the KO-D Openweight Championship then held by Tetsuya Endo. In the group phase of the tournament, Akiyama suffered only two losses: one at the hands of Endo and one against Kazusada Higuchi. Akiyama went on to defeat Endo on February 14, 2021, at Kawasaki Strong 2021 to win the title. He then decided to challenge Higuchi for his first defense, in order to avenge his remaining D-Oh Grand Prix loss.

On March 14, 2021, at Day Dream Believer 2021, Sanshiro Takagi announced he had assembled a surprise team to challenge for the KO-D 8-Man Tag Team Championship. The team, baptized "Team Thoroughbred" was centered around the concept of nepotism and featured Yukio Naya (son of former sekiwake Takatōriki Tadashige and grandson of former yokozuna Taihō Kōki), Chikara (grandson of the "Father of Puroresu" Rikidōzan) and Yakan Nabe (son of comedian Osami Nabe).

== Event ==
=== Preliminary matches ===
In the opening match, Chris Brookes and Toui Kojima faced Yusuke Okada and Yuki Iino. Iino performed a spear on Brookes while Okada submitted Kojima with a Boston Crab for the victory.

Next, Soma Takao faced Hideki Okatani. In the climax, Takao kicked out of a Northern Lights Suplex, countered Okatani with an elbow strike and performed the "Gin Tonic" (a cradle variant of a back-to-belly piledriver) to win the match.

Following the match, the participants of the revived Ultimate Tag League that would take place in May were announced.

Next, Danshoku Dino, Makoto Oishi and Saki Akai faced Toru Owashi, Akito and Keigo Nakamura. Oishi, now the leader of the Junretsu stable centered around Jun Akiyama, tried to convince Dino and Owashi to have a more serious match than their usual comedic style. Oishi finally gave up on the idea and ended up having his face pushed into Dino's exposed backside, causing him to pass out. The arena lights flashed out and Oishi rose as an "anal zombie". In the end, Dino pinned Nakamura with the "Gaydo Clutch" to win the bout.

After this, Shinya Aoki, Super Sasadango Machine, Antonio Honda and Kazuki Hirata defended the KO-D 8-Man Tag Team Championship against Team Thoroughbred (Sanshiro Takagi, Yukio Naya, Chikara and Yakan Nabe). In the closing moments, Takagi, Naya, Chikara and Nabe all hit Super Sasadango Machine with chops and Naya performed a belly-to-back suplex to get a pinfall victory and win the title. Following the match, Chikara dedicated the win to his father Mitsuo Momota who was hospitalized.

In the next match, Harashima faced Yukio Sakaguchi. Harashima staggered Sakaguchi with a jumping high kick, before performing the "Somato" to win the match.

After that, Wrestle Peter Pan 2021 was announced to take place on August 21 at the Fujitsu Stadium Kawasaki.

In the penultimate match, Damnation (Daisuke Sasaki, Tetsuya Endo, Yuji Hino and Mad Paulie) faced The37Kamiina (Konosuke Takeshita, Yuki Ueno, Shunma Katsumata and Mao). Takeshita performed a "Last Ride" powerbomb on Paulie, allowing Mao and Ueno to launch Katsumata in the air to land a diving splash and get a pinfall victory.

=== Main event ===
In the main event, Jun Akiyama defended the KO-D Openweight Championship against Kazusada Higuchi (accompanied by Saki Akai and Yukio Sakaguchi). Akiyama extensively used knee strikes to avoid Higuchi's "Brain Claw". He performed the "Exploder '98" but Higuchi kicked out at 2. In the end, Akiyama removed his kneepad to hit a running knee strike, pin Higuchi and retain his title. Following the match, Danshoku Dino challenged Akiyama to a future title match. The match was then scheduled for April 11.

== Results ==
No.	Results	Stipulations	Times
1	Yusuke Okada and Yuki Iino defeated Chris Brookes and Toui Kojima by submission	Tag team match	10:51
2	Soma Takao defeated Hideki Okatani	Singles match	6:19
3	Danshoku Dino, Makoto Oishi and Saki Akai defeated Toru Owashi, Akito and Keigo Nakamura	Six-person tag team match	9:16
4	Team Thoroughbred (Sanshiro Takagi, Yukio Naya, Chikara and Yakan Nabe) defeated Shinya Aoki, Super Sasadango Machine, Antonio Honda and Kazuki Hirata (c)	Eight-man tag team match for the KO-D 8-Man Tag Team Championship	9:48
5	Harashima defeated Yukio Sakaguchi	Singles match	6:03
6	The37Kamiina (Konosuke Takeshita, Yuki Ueno, Shunma Katsumata and Mao) defeated Damnation (Daisuke Sasaki, Tetsuya Endo, Yuji Hino and Mad Paulie) (with Soma Takao)	Eight-man tag team match	16:08
7	Jun Akiyama (c) defeated Kazusada Higuchi (with Saki Akai and Yukio Sakaguchi)	Singles match for the KO-D Openweight Championship	21:10
(c) / – the champion(s) heading into the match
