= Kawasaki Strong 2021 =

2021 DDT Pro-Wrestling event

- Promotional poster featuring most of the participants
- Promotion: CyberFight
- Brand: DDT Pro-Wrestling
- Date: February 14, 2021
- City: Kawasaki, Japan
- Venue: Culttz Kawasaki
- Attendance: 900
- Tagline: If you want to see pro-wrestling, DDT!

Event chronology
← Previous; Ultimate Party 2020	Next → Into The Fight 2021

Kawasaki Strong 2021 was a professional wrestling event promoted by CyberFight's DDT Pro-Wrestling (DDT). It took place on February 14, 2021, in Kawasaki, Japan, at the Culttz Kawasaki arena. The event aired live on Fighting TV Samurai and on DDT's streaming service Wrestle Universe.

Eight matches were contested at the event. The main event saw Jun Akiyama defeat Tetsuya Endo to win the KO-D Openweight Championship. In another prominent match, Yuki Ueno successfully retained the DDT Universal Championship against Yukio Sakaguchi.

== Production ==
Other on-screen personnel
Role:	Name:
Commentators	Sayoko Mita
Commentators	Haruo Murata
Commentators	Kenta Kobashi (guest)
Ring announcer	Inoue Mic
Referees	Yukinori Matsui
Referees	Daisuke Kiso

=== Background ===
Usually, DDT holds two major events each year, often in venues such as the Ryōgoku Kokugikan, the Nippon Budokan or the Ota City General Gymnasium. As a result of the COVID-19 pandemic in Japan and the rescheduled 2020 Summer Olympics, DDT had to consider new venues for their 2021 events and picked the Culttz Kawasaki arena located in Kawasaki, Kanagawa.

=== Storylines ===
The show featured eight professional wrestling matches that resulted from scripted storylines, where wrestlers portray villains, heroes, or less distinguishable characters in the scripted events that build tension and culminate in a wrestling match or series of matches.

On December 27, 2020, Jun Akiyama defeated Konosuke Takeshita in the final of the D-Oh Grand Prix 2021 tournament, earning himself first contendership to the KO-D Openweight Championship held by Tetsuya Endo. The match was then officially signed the next day at a press conference.

On November 3, 2020, at Ultimate Party 2020, Yuki Ueno became the 4th DDT Universal Champion by defeating Chris Brookes. After successfully defending it for the second time on January 9, 2021, he asked for his next challenger to be Yukio Sakaguchi, from whom he said he learned a lot in the past year. Sakaguchi accepted the match, then, in the backstage interview that followed, snuck up behind Ueno and applied a sleeper hold to choke him out.

On December 21, 2020, the KO-D 10-Man Tag Team Championship was vacated and renamed "KO-D 8-Man Tag Team Championship" due to the difficulty of scheduling a proper title defense during the pandemic. A title match was immediately announced for the Kawasaki Strong 2021 event in which a team led by Sanshiro Takagi would face a team led by Shinya Aoki. The remaining participants were later announced one after another. Takagi and Aoki had previously been fighting over the DDT Extreme Division Championship with Takagi finally winning the title and ending Aoki's 237 days reign (the third longest in the title history) at Ultimate Party 2020.

On January 3, 2021, at the New Year's Day special show, Yuki Iino, a member of the All Out stable who was scheduled to return from an injury at the Kawasaki event, angrily confronted Yuji Hino who had returned to DDT on December 23 and aligned himself with the rival Damnation stable. A singles match between the two was scheduled for the February 23 event and Iino return match would be an eight-man tag team match pitting All Out against Damnation.

== Event ==
=== Preliminary matches ===
The event opened with the two youngest members of the Junretsu stable Mizuki Watase and Hideki Okatani facing Yusuke Okada and Toui Kojima. In the end, Watase submitted Kojima with a Boston crab.

The second match of the evening saw the team of Shinya Aoki, Super Sasadango Machine, Antonio Honda and Kazuki Hirata win the vacant KO-D 8-Man Tag Team Championship. In the closing moment, Hirata's signature dance routine caused the lights to go out. In order to restore power to the venue, Danshoku Dino offered to use his "anal electricity" as a power supply, but the extension chord brought by assistant producer Hisaya Imabayashi was too short to reach the ring. One by one, the competitors each gave a speech regarding the importance of sacrifice and joined a human chain connecting Dino's behind to the chord. With the power back on, Hirata was able to perform his dance routine but this caused Dino's power to run out. Finally, Aoki offered to use his own "anal electricity" power, Hirata was able to finish his dance and then pinned Sanshiro Takagi for the victory.

Next, Saki Akai and Maya Yukihi faced Saori Anou and Miyako Matsumoto. Annoyed by her partner's antics, Anou performed a fisherman buster on Matsumoto. This allowed Akai to get a pinfall victory after executing the "Rookie Award" on Matsumoto. Akai, Yuhiki and Anou then posed all together for the photographs and quickly exited the ring when Matsumoto tried to join in.

The penultimate match was Yuki Ueno defending the DDT Universal Championship against veteran Yukio Sakaguchi. Ueno executed a "WR" (a modified "Ranhei") but wasn't able to get a pinfall out of it. Sakaguchi went for a Sleeper Hold but Ueno reversed the hold. The referee called for a technical knockout and awarded the victory to Ueno. Following the match, Sakaguchi got back on his feet and handed Ueno his title belt himself as a mark of respect.

=== Main event ===
In the main event of the evening, Tetsuya Endo defended the KO-D Openweight Championship against D-Oh Grand Prix 2021 winner Jun Akiyama. Endo heavily targeted Akiyama's surgically repaired knee while Akiyama kept on hitting Exploder suplexes one after another on Endo. In the closing moments of the bout, Akiyama evaded Endo's signature "Shooting Star Press" and took the opportunity to hit Endo with various knee strikes. Then, he performed the "Exploder '98" but Endo managed to kick out. Finally, Akiyama scored the pinfall victory after a "Modified Sternness Dust α".

== Results ==
No.	Results	Stipulations	Times
1	Junretsu (Mizuki Watase and Hideki Okatani) defeated Yusuke Okada and Toui Kojima by submission	Tag team match	8:30
2	Shinya Aoki, Super Sasadango Machine, Antonio Honda and Kazuki Hirata defeated Sanshiro Takagi, Danshoku Dino, Toru Owashi and Makoto Oishi	Eight-man No Disqualification match for the vacant KO-D 8-Man Tag Team Championship	12:49
3	Saki Akai and Maya Yukihi defeated Saori Anou and Miyako Matsumoto	Tag team match	10:52
4	Super Delfin and NEO Itoh Respect Army (Chris Brookes and Maki Itoh) defeated Mao, Keigo Nakamura and Mirai Maiumi	Six-person Tornado tag team match	16:07
5	Smile Pissari (Harashima and Yuji Okabayashi) defeated Kazusada Higuchi and Yukio Naya	Tag team match	13:34
6	All Out (Konosuke Takeshita, Yuki Iino, Akito and Shunma Katsumata) defeated Damnation (Yuji Hino, Daisuke Sasaki, Soma Takao and Mad Paulie)	Eight-man tag team match	20:34
7	Yuki Ueno (with Mao) (c) defeated Yukio Sakaguchi (with Saki Akai and Kazusada Higuchi) by technical knockout	Singles match for the DDT Universal Championship	17:10
8	Jun Akiyama defeated Tetsuya Endo (with Daisuke Sasaki, Soma Takao and Mad Paulie) (c)	Singles match for the KO-D Openweight Championship	31:11
(c) / – the champion(s) heading into the match
