= High Stakes (2025) =

2025 Revolution Pro Wrestling event

- Promotional poster featuring Mercedes Moné
- Promotion: Revolution Pro Wrestling
- Date: 20 April 2025
- City: Doncaster, England
- Venue: Doncaster Dome
- Tagline: Moné Changes Everything

Event chronology
← Previous; Epic Encounter	Next → Regresa A Barcelona

High Stakes chronology
← Previous; 2024	Next → 2026

High Stakes (2025) was the 12th High Stakes professional wrestling event produced by Revolution Pro Wrestling (RevPro). It took place on 20 April 2025 at the Doncaster Dome in Doncaster, England. The event featured the RevPro debut of Mercedes Moné.

== Storylines ==
The event featured professional wrestling matches that involved different wrestlers from pre-existing scripted feuds and storylines. Wrestlers portray heroes, villains, or less distinguishable characters in scripted events that build tension and culminate in a wrestling match or series of matches. Storylines are produced on RevPro's weekly tour-based shows.

== Results ==
No.	Results	Stipulations	Times
1	JJ Gale defeated David Francisco, Jay Joshua, Robbie X, Stephen Wolf and Zozaya by pinfall	Scramble match	11:25
2	RKJ defeated Donovan Dijak by pinfall	Singles match	13:15
3	Will Kaven (c) defeated Lio Rush by pinfall	Singles match for the Undisputed British Cruiserweight Championship	13:25
4	Dani Luna defeated Amira Blair, Anita Vaughan, Charli Evans, Emersyn Jayne, LA Taylor, Lizzy Evo, Mercedez Blaze, Safire Reed, Serena Deeb and Skye Smitson	Women's Revolution Gauntlet match	31:30
5	Leon Cage defeated Nino Bryant by pinfall	Singles match	21:45
6	Michael Oku (c) defeated Leon Slater by pinfall	Singles match for the Undisputed British Heavyweight Championship	33:00
7	Mercedes Moné (c) defeated Kanji by pinfall	Singles match for the Undisputed British Women's Championship	19:45
(c) / – the champion(s) heading into the match

== See also ==
- 2025 in professional wrestling
