= High Stakes (2026) =

2026 Revolution Pro Wrestling event

- Promotional poster featuring Mercedes Moné
- Promotion: Revolution Pro Wrestling
- Date: March 21, 2026
- City: Wolverhampton, England
- Venue: The Hangar

Event chronology
← Previous; Uprising	Next → Epic Encounter

High Stakes chronology
← Previous; 2025	Next → —

High Stakes (2026) was the 13th annual High Stakes professional wrestling event produced by Revolution Pro Wrestling. It took place on March 21, 2026 at The Hangar in Wolverhampton, England. The event also featured wrestlers from All Elite Wrestling (AEW).

== Storylines ==
The event featured professional wrestling matches involving different wrestlers from pre-existing scripted feuds and storylines. Wrestlers portray heroes, villains, or less distinguishable characters in scripted events that build tension and culminate in a wrestling match or series of matches. Storylines are produced on RevPro's weekly tour-based shows.

=== Event ===
The event started with the singles confrontation between Isaac Murray and Tom Thelwell, solded with the victory of the latter. Next up, Ricochet, Bishop Kaun and Toa Liona picked up a victory over Nino Bryant, Leland Bryant, and Zander Bryant in six-man tag team competition. The third bout saw Leyton Buzzard, Joe Lando, Danny Black and Maverick Mayhew and Taylor James outmatch Luke Jacobs, Ethan Allen, Liam Slater, Cameron Khai and HMD in ten-man tag team competition. In the fourth bout, Leon Slater defeated Connor Mills in singles competition. In the next two matches, Trent Seven defeated Thomas Shire, and Michael Oku defeated Ricky Sosa in the same type of bouts. In the semi main event, Jay Joshua defeated 1 Called Manders to retain the Undisputed British Heavyweight Championship.

In the main event, Alexxis Falcon defeated Mercedes Moné in a winner takes all match to win both the Bodyslam Scandinavian Championship and the Discovery Scottish Women's Championship.

== Results ==
No.	Results	Stipulations	Times
1	Tom Thelwell defeated Isaac Murray by pinfall	Singles match	—
2	Michael Oku (with Amira Blair) defeated Man Like DeReiss by submission	Revolution Road first round match	21:32
3	Leyton Buzzard, Taylor James, and CPF (Joe Lando, Danny Black and Maverick Mayhew) defeated Young Guns (Luke Jacobs and Ethan Allen), and Slater Dojo (Liam Slater, Cameron Khai, and HMD) by pinfall	Ten-man tag team elimination match	—
4	Alexxis Falcon defeated Mercedes Moné (c) by pinfall	Winner Takes All match for the Bodyslam Scandinavian and Discovery Scottish Women's Championship	15:56
5	Trent Seven defeated Thomas Shire by pinfall	Revolution Road first round match	19:16
6	Leon Slater defeated Connor Mills by pinfall	Singles match	19:30
7	The Demand (Ricochet, Bishop Kaun and Toa Liona) defeated Flying Bryant Brothers (Nino Bryant, Leland Bryant, and Zander Bryant) by pinfall	Six-man tag team match	18:57
8	Jay Joshua (c) defeated 1 Called Manders by pinfall	Singles match for the Undisputed British Heavyweight Championship	28:23
(c) / – the champion(s) heading into the match

== See also ==
- 2026 in professional wrestling
