= Differ Cup =

The Differ Cup is a cross-promotional professional wrestling tournament in Japan, contested among several teams of junior heavyweight tag teams, each typically representing a particular promotion. It was originally held biennially, first in 2003, then in 2005 and finally in 2007. After a ten-year hiatus, the tournament was revived in 2017. Since the founding of the Global Professional Wrestling Alliance in 2006, the Differ Cup had been considered a production of the GPWA, with several GPWA member promotions participating.

The tournament, featuring eight teams, would be held over two nights at the Tokyo Differ Ariake, which the tournament derived its name from. The quarterfinals and semifinals were held on the first night, with the finals and third place matches, as well as several non-tournament bouts, contested on the second.

== Results ==
=== List of winners ===
Year	Winners
2003	Último Dragón and Yossino (Toryumon Japan)
2005	Kenta and Naomichi Marufuji (Noah)
2007	Madoka and Kengo Mashimo (K-Dojo)
2017	Konosuke Takeshita and Yuki Ueno (DDT)

=== 2003 ===
The 2003 Differ Cup was held on February 8 and February 9. It involved the following teams:

- Kudo and Mikami (DDT)
- Tetsuhiro Kuroda and Chocoball Mukai (WEW)
- Yoshihito Sasaki and Tatsuhito Takaiwa (Zero1-Max)
- Masao Orihara and Ikuto Hidaka (Michinoku Pro)
- Kenta and Kotaro Suzuki (Pro Wrestling Noah)
- The Great Takeru and Kappa Kozou (IWA Japan)
- Último Dragón and Yossino (Toryumon Japan)
- Jun Kasai and Gran Naniwa (freelance)

Quarter-finals
Kudo and Mikami	Pin
Kuroda and Mukai	18:11
Hidaka and Orihara	Pin
Sasaki and Takaiwa	16:31
Kenta and Suzuki	Pin
Kozou and Takeru	20:44
Kasai and Naniwa	Sub
Dragón and Yossino	15:47

Semi-finals
Kudo and Mikami	Pin
Sasaki and Takaiwa	15:21
Kenta and Suzuki	Sub
Dragon and Yossino	11:49

Final
Sasaki and Takaiwa	Sub
Dragon and Yossino	20:27
Third place
Kudo and Mikami	Pin
Kenta and Suzuki	24:52

=== 2005 ===
The 2005 Differ Cup was held on May 7 and May 8. The winners, Kenta and Naomichi Marufuji, were also the GHC Junior Heavyweight Champions; their opponents in the finals, Minoru Fujita and Ikuto Hidaka, were the Zero1-Max International Lightweight Tag Team Champions. The following teams were involved:

- Tiger Emperor and Super Shisa (freelance)
- Takehiro Murahama and Katsuhiko Nakajima (freelance)
- Minoru Fujita and Ikuto Hidaka (Zero1-Max)
- Taka Michinoku and Psycho (K-Dojo)
- Kenta and Naomichi Marufuji (Noah)
- Kota Ibushi and Kudo (DDT)
- Kaz Hayashi and Leonardo Spanky (freelance)
- Gentaro and Takashi Sasaki (freelance)

Quarter-finals
Emperor and Shisa	Pin
Murahama and Nakajima	16:54
Fujita and Hidaka	Pin
Taka and Psycho	11:52
Kenta and Marufuji	Pin
Ibushi and Kudo	15:44
Hayashi and Spanky	Pin
Gentaro and Sasaki	15:26

Semi-finals
Emperor and Shisa	Pin
Fujita and Hidaka	11:29
Kenta and Marufuji	Pin
Hayashi and Spanky	19:12

Final
Fujita and Hidaka	Pin
Kenta and Marufuji	35:24
Third place
Emperor and Shisa	Pin
Hayashi and Spanky	18:44

=== 2007 ===
The third incarnation of the Differ Cup was held on May 5 and May 6. The event featured the following teams:

- Yoshinobu Kanemaru and Ippei Ota (Noah)
- Madoka and Kengo Mashimo (K-Dojo)
- Harashima and Kota Ibushi (DDT)
- Manabu Hara and Katsumi Usuda (BML)
- Kagetora and Banana Senga (El Dorado)
- Ikuto Hidaka and Osamu Namiguchi (Zero1-Max)
- Keizo Matsuda and Kappa Kozou (IWA Japan)
- Black Emperor and Pentagon Viper (GPWA)

Quarter-finals
Kanemaru and Ota	Pin
Hidaka and Namiguchi	18:48
Madoka and Mashimo	Pin
Emperor and Viper	16:21
Harashima and Ibushi	16:46
Hara and Usuda	Stop
Kagetora and Senga	Pin
Matsuda and Kozou	9:00

Semi-finals
Hidaka and Namiguchi	Pin
Madoka and Mashimo	17:59
Harashima and Ibushi	Pin
Kagetora and Senga	12:13

Final
Madoka and Mashimo	Pin
Harashima and Ibushi	26:16
Third place
Hidaka and Namiguchi	Pin
Kagetora and Senga	13:28

=== 2017 ===
After a ten-year hiatus, Differ Cup's revival was announced on September 28, 2017. The tournament took place on November 28 and featured teams from DDT Pro-Wrestling, Pro Wrestling Freedoms, Pro Wrestling Noah and Pro Wrestling Zero1. The event featured the following teams:

- Hitoshi Kumano and Katsuhiko Nakajima (Noah)
- Konosuke Takeshita and Yuki Ueno (DDT)
- Jun Kasai and Tomoya Hirata (Freedoms)
- Sean Guinness and Tatsuhito Takaiwa (Zero1)

Semifinals
Kumano and Nakajima	Pin
Guinness and Takaiwa	12:35
Takeshita and Ueno	Pin
Kasai and Hirata	9:37

Final
Kumano and Nakajima	Pin
Takeshita and Ueno	16:48
