= RevPro High Stakes =

Professional wrestling supercard by RevPro

High Stakes
- Promotions: Revolution Pro Wrestling
- First event: 2013

High Stakes is a major professional wrestling event produced by Revolution Pro Wrestling (RPW). The event has been annually produced in RPW from 2013 to present, except for 2023.

== Winners, dates, venues and main events ==
Event	Date	City	Venue	Main event	Ref.
High Stakes (2013)	March 31, 2013	Sittingbourne, Kent, England	Wyvern Hall	Sha Samuels (c) vs.Colt Cabana for the RevPro British Heavyweight Championship	
High Stakes (2014)	March 15, 2014	London, England	York Hall	El Ligero vs. Sonjay Dutt	
High Stakes (2015)	February 15, 2015	London, England	York Hall	A.J. Styles vs. Will Ospreay	
High Stakes (2016)	January 16, 2016	London, England	York Hall	Zack Sabre Jr. vs. A.J. Styles (c) for the RevPro British Heavyweight Championship	
High Stakes (2017)	January 21, 2017	London, England	York Hall	Katsuyori Shibata (c) vs. Matt Riddle for the RevPro British Heavyweight Championship	
High Stakes (2018)	January 20, 2018	London, England	York Hall	Suzuki-gun (Minoru Suzuki and Zack Sabre Jr.) vs. Moustache Mountain (Trent Seven and Tyler Bate) (c) for the RevPro British Tag Team Championships	
High Stakes (2019)	February 15, 2019	London, England	York Hall	Pac vs. Will Ospreay	
High Stakes (2020)	February 14, 2020	London, England	York Hall	Will Ospreay vs. Zack Sabre Jr.	
High Stakes (2021)	September 19, 2021	London, England	York Hall	Will Ospreay (c) vs. Ricky Knight Jr. (c) to unify the Undisputed British Heavyweight Championship and RevPro British Heavyweight Championships	
High Stakes (2022)	January 29, 2022	London, England	York Hall	Will Ospreay (c) vs. Michael Oku (w/Connor Mills) for the Undisputed British Heavyweight Championship	
High Stakes (2024)	February 18, 2024	London, England	Crystal Palace National Sports Centre	Michael Oku (c) vs.Will Ospreay for the Undisputed British Heavyweight Championship	
High Stakes (2025)	April 20, 2025	Doncaster, England	Doncaster Dome	Mercedes Moné (c) vs. Kanji for the Undisputed British Women's Championship	
High Stakes (2026)	March 21, 2026	Wolverhampton, England	The Hangar	Jay Joshua (c) vs. 1 Called Manders for the Undisputed British Heavyweight Championship	
