= High Stakes (2024) =

2024 Revolution Pro-Wrestling event

- Promotional poster featuring Michael Oku and Will Ospreay
- Promotion: Revolution Pro Wrestling
- Date: 18 February 2024
- City: London, England
- Venue: Crystal Palace National Sports Centre
- Attendance: cca. 3000

Event chronology
← Previous; Seasons Beatings	Next → Revolution Rumble

High Stakes chronology
← Previous; 2022	Next → 2025

High Stakes (2024) was the 11th High Stakes professional wrestling event produced by Revolution Pro Wrestling (RevPro) that took place on 18 February 2024, at the Crystal Palace National Sports Centre in London.

The event marked Will Ospreay's last RevPro match before officially signing with All Elite Wrestling (AEW). All Elite Wrestling owner Tony Khan was present for the event, with Ospreay addressing him following the main event.

== Storylines ==
The event featured eleven professional wrestling matches that involved different wrestlers from pre-existing scripted feuds and storylines. Wrestlers portray heroes, villains, or less distinguishable characters in scripted events that build tension and culminate in a wrestling match or series of matches. Storylines are produced on RevPro's weekly tour-based shows.

== Results ==
No.	Results	Stipulations	Times
1	Orange Cassidy (c) defeated Richard Holliday, Flash Morgan Webster, Sha Samuels, Spike Trivet, Shigehiro Irie and Cameron Khai by pinfall	Six-way scramble for the AEW International Championship	8:03
2	Dani Luna (c) defeated Safire Reed by pinfall	Singles match for the Undisputed British Women's Championship	9:42
3	Young Blood (Yuto Nakashima and Oskar Leube) defeated Kieron Lacey and Mark Trew by pinfall	Tag team match	9:27
4	Luke Jacobs defeated JJ Gale by pinfall	Singles match	17:02
5	Mustafa Ali defeated Robbie X by pinfall	Singles match	13:06
6	Shingo Takagi defeated Trent Seven by pinfall	Singles match	21:58
7	Anthony Ogogo defeated Ricky Knight Jr. by pinfall	Singles match	13:27
8	Zack Sabre Jr. defeated Connor Mills by pinfall	Singles match	21:24
9	Michael Oku (c) (with Amira) defeated Will Ospreay by submission	Singles match for the Undisputed British Heavyweight Championship	47:10
(c) / – the champion(s) heading into the match

== See also ==
- 2024 in professional wrestling
