= Konosuke Takeshita =

Japanese professional wrestler (born 1995)

- Takeshita in August 2026

Personal information
- Born: May 29, 1995 (age 31) Osaka, Japan
- Spouse: Yuka Sakazaki (m. 2025)

Professional wrestling career
- Ring name(s): Konosuke Takeshita; The Nishinaritaker; Takeshita=Pehlwan
- Billed height: 187 cm (6 ft 2 in)
- Billed weight: 114 kg (251 lb)
- Billed from: Osaka, Japan
- Trained by: Atsushi Maruyama; DDT Pro-Wrestling; Hub; Yasu Urano
- Debut: August 18, 2012

Konosuke Takeshita (竹下 幸之介, Takeshita Kōnosuke; born May 29, 1995; ring-name stylized in all caps) is a Japanese professional wrestler. As of November 2022, he is signed to the American promotion All Elite Wrestling (AEW). He has also been signed to Japanese promotions DDT Pro-Wrestling since 2011, and New Japan Pro-Wrestling (NJPW) since January 2025.

Takeshita was named the Rookie of the Year by Tokyo Sports in 2013 and is a five-time KO-D Openweight Champion, having first won the title on his 21st birthday to become the youngest holder in its history. He went on to become a four-time KO-D Tag Team Champion, five-time KO-D 6-Man Tag Team Champion, four-time Ironman Heavymetalweight Champion, one-time winner of the Ultimate Tag League (2021), two-time winner of the King of DDT Tournament (2019 and 2021), and record-setting two-time winner of the D-Oh Grand Prix (2019 and 2021 II). He signed with AEW in 2022, winning the AEW International Championship twice. He is also a one-time NEVER Openweight Champion in NJPW and the 35th G1 Climax tournament winner, the latter of which led to him becoming a one-time IWGP Heavyweight Champion.

== Early life ==
Konosuke Takeshita was born in Osaka on May 29, 1995. He participated in track and field at school. His mother is Keiko Takeshita; she would go on to become DDT's Ironman Heavymetalweight Champion in 2022 at an event that celebrated Konosuke's 10th year anniversary as a pro wrestler.

== Professional wrestling career ==
=== DDT Pro-Wrestling (2012–present) ===
==== Early years (2012–2017) ====
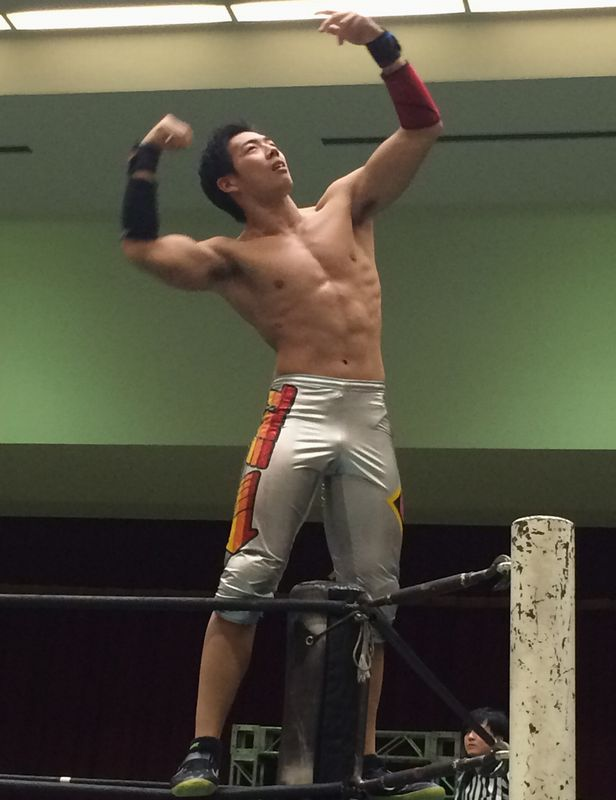
Takeshita in November 2014

In 2011, Takeshita began training for a professional wrestling career with DDT Pro-Wrestling. He had been a wrestling fan since childhood and had attended a DDT show as a 12-year-old, where he was kissed by wrestler Danshoku Dino. On April 1, 2012, DDT announced that he would debut for the promotion on August 18 at Tokyo's Nippon Budokan. Prior to his debut match, he took part in exhibition matches. During one of these matches on August 4, he scored an upset win over Hiroshi Fukuda to claim the Ironman Heavymetalweight Championship. The title had a 24/7 rule where it could be won anytime and anywhere. As Takeshita was being congratulated by DDT general manager Amon Tsurumi for winning his first match before his official debut, Fukuda hit him with a low blow and pinned him to immediately regain the title.

On August 18, 2012, at Budokan Peter Pan, Takeshita was defeated by El Generico in his official debut match. On November 25, Takeshita pinned Poison Sawada Julie in his retirement match, a six-man tag team match. At the end of 2013, Tokyo Sports named Takeshita Japanese professional wrestling's Rookie of the Year, with him becoming the first wrestler still in high school to win the award. He also finished second in Wrestling Observer Newsletter's award category for Rookie of the Year, losing to Yohei Komatsu by four votes (906–902).

On January 26, 2014, Takeshita received his first-ever shot at one of the King of DDT (KO-D) titles, when he and Tetsuya Endo challenged for the KO-D Tag Team Championship in a three-way match, which was won by the Golden☆Lovers (Kenny Omega and Kota Ibushi) and also included Isami Kodaka and Yuko Miyamoto. On May 6, Takeshita came together with Antonio Honda to form the "Happy Motel" stable. In June, he signed with the Oscar Promotion talent agency. He and Honda were eventually joined by Tetsuya Endo, with whom they went on to win the KO-D 6-Man Tag Team Championship by defeating Shuten-dōji (Kudo, Masa Takanashi and Yukio Sakaguchi) on July 13. They lost the title back to Shuten-dōji seven days later.

On August 17, Takeshita took part in a high-profile interpromotional match, when he was defeated by New Japan Pro-Wrestling (NJPW) representative Hiroshi Tanahashi at DDT's annual Ryōgoku Kokugikan event. On September 28, Takeshita and Endo defeated Kenny Omega and Kota Ibushi to win the KO-D Tag Team Championship for the first time. Afterwards, Omega dubbed Takeshita the "Future of DDT". Takeshita and Endo went on to lose the title to Daisuke Sekimoto and Yuji Okabayashi on February 15, 2015. The following June, Takeshita made it to the finals of the 2015 King of DDT tournament, but was defeated there by Yukio Sakaguchi. On December 23, Takeshita and Endo defeated Shigehiro Irie and Yuji Okabayashi in the finals of a tournament to regain the vacant KO-D Tag Team Championship.

With Kudo sidelined with an injury and Kota Ibushi announcing his resignation from DDT, Takeshita was poised to take a larger role in the promotion. On January 3, 2016, he received his first shot at DDT's top title, the KO-D Openweight Championship, but was defeated by the defending champion, Isami Kodaka. On March 21, Takeshita and Endo lost the KO-D Tag Team Championship to Daisuke Sasaki and Shuji Ishikawa. On May 29, his 21st birthday at Audience 2016, Takeshita defeated Daisuke Sasaki to win the KO-D Openweight Championship for the first time. With the win, Takeshita became the youngest KO-D Openweight Champion in history, beating the previous record held by Nosawa Rongai by three years and six months. On June 15, Takeshita made his debut for All Japan Pro Wrestling (AJPW), teaming with Tetsuya Endo in a tag team match, where they defeated Jun Akiyama and Yuma Aoyagi. On July 17, Takeshita successfully defended the KO-D Openweight Championship against his tag team partner Tetsuya Endo. After the match, Endo turned on Takeshita and joined Daisuke Sasaki's Damnation stable. After three successful title defenses, Takeshita lost the KO-D Openweight Championship to Shuji Ishikawa on August 28 at DDT's biggest event of the year, Ryōgoku Peter Pan. On December 4, Takeshita and Mike Bailey defeated Daisuke Sasaki and Tetsuya Endo to win the KO-D Tag Team Championship. They lost the title to Masakatsu Funaki and Yukio Sakaguchi in their second defense on January 9, 2017.

==== All Out (2017–2021) ====
On January 29, Takeshita defeated Kudo in the finals of a tournament to become the number one contender to the KO-D Openweight Championship. At Judgement, Takeshita defeated Harashima to win the KO-D Openweight Championship for the second time. The following month, Takeshita and Akito formed a new unit named "All Out". On August 20 at the 2017 Ryōgoku Peter Pan show, Takeshita made his seventh successful defense of the KO-D Openweight Championship against 2017 King of DDT winner Tetsuya Endo. On October 22, Takeshita set a new record for most successful defenses of the KO-D Openweight Championship by making his ninth defense against Danshoku Dino. On November 2, Takeshita became a double champion, when he and his All Out stablemates Akito and Diego defeated Damnation (Daisuke Sasaki, Mad Paulie and Shuji Ishikawa) to win the vacant KO-D 6-Man Tag Team Championship. On November 28, Takeshita and Yuki Ueno won the cross-promotional 2017 Differ Cup by defeating the Pro Wrestling Noah team of Hitoshi Kumano and Katsuhiko Nakajima in the finals. This marked the first Differ Cup held in 10 years. On December 10, All Out lost the KO-D 6-Man Tag Team Championship to Shuten-dōji.

In January 2018, Takeshita competed in the first edition of the D-Oh Grand Prix, competing in the A Block. Takeshita finished with 7 points, failing to advance to the finals. On March 25 at Judgement, Takeshita achieved his 11th successful defense of the KO-D Openweight Championship against Shuji Ishikawa. He finally lost the title to Shigehiro Irie the following month at Max Bump, on April 29. On June 26, Takeshita, Akito and Shunma Katsumata defeated Koju Takeda, Kota Umeda and Yuki Ueno to win the KO-D 6-Man Tag Team Championship. On December 30, Takeshita won the D-Oh Grand Prix 2019 by defeating Go Shiozaki in the finals.

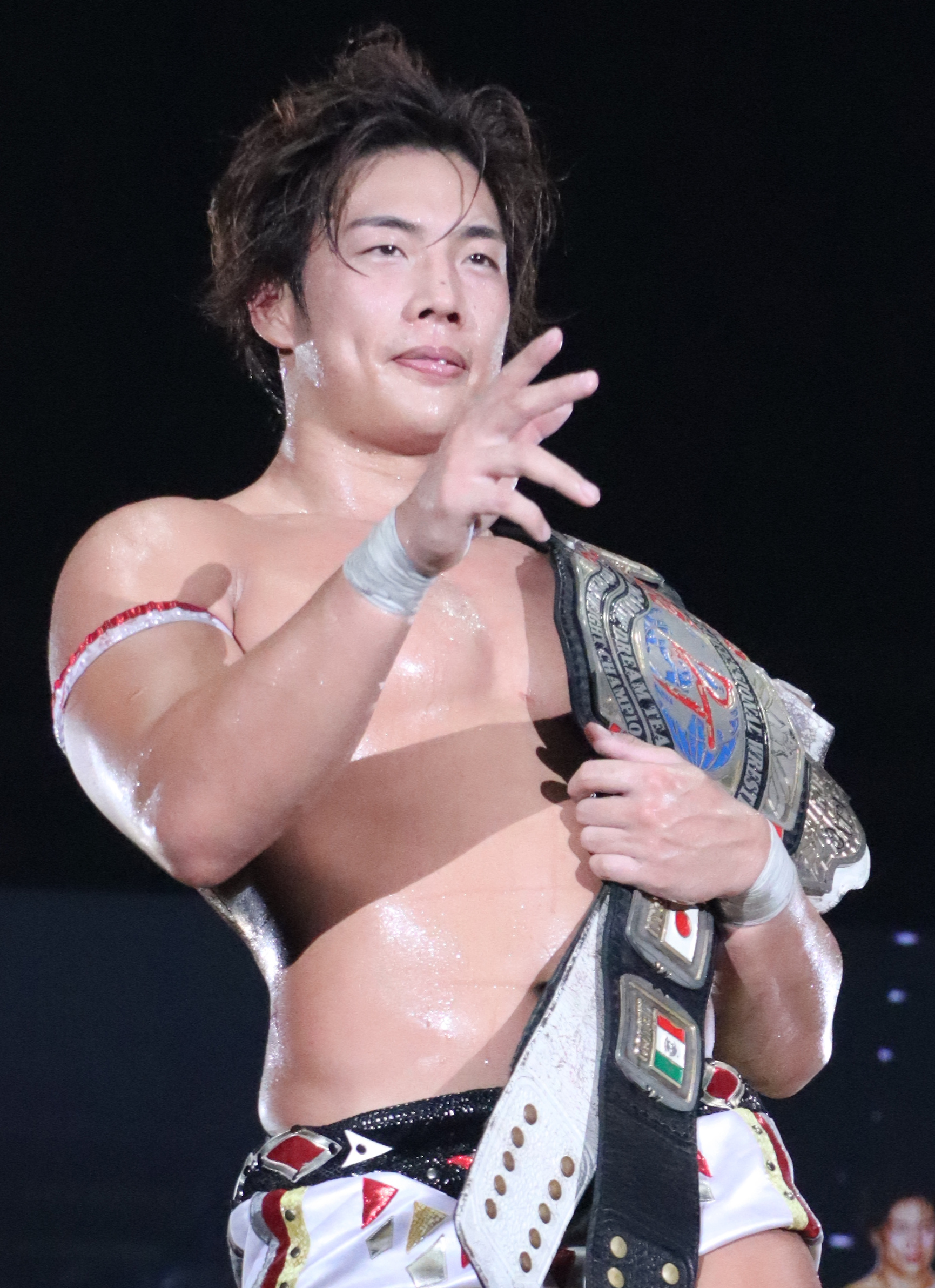
Takeshita in July 2019 during his fourth reign as KO-D Openweight Champion.

On February 17, 2019, at Judgement, Takeshita defeated Daisuke Sasaki to win his third KO-D Openweight Championship. On April 4 at DDT Is Coming to America, Takeshita lost the title to Daisuke Sasaki. Later on, Tetsuya Endo cashed in his "Right To Challenge Anytime, Anywhere" contract to win the title. On May 19, Takeshita defeated Soma Takao in the finals of the 2019 King of DDT tournament and thus became the number one contender to the KO-D Openweight Championship then held by Endo. On June 24, along with his All Out stablemates Shunma Katsumata and Yuki Iino, he won the KO-D 6-Man Tag Team Championship by defeating Chihiro Hashimoto, Dash Chisako and Meiko Satomura. On July 15, at Wrestle Peter Pan, he won the KO-D Openweight Championship by defeating Tetsuya Endo.

On February 23, 2020, at Into The Fight, Takeshita was defeated by Chris Brookes in a match to crown the inaugural DDT Universal Champion. On March 22, he lost the 6-man title to the team of Tetsuya Endo, T-Hawk and El Lindaman at Judgement. On the first night of Wrestle Peter Pan, on June 6, Takeshita defeated Yoshihiko in a pre-taped cinematic Last Man Standing match parodying the "Boneyard match" between AJ Styles and The Undertaker at WrestleMania 36. In August, Takeshita entered the King of DDT Tournament, defeating Naomi Yoshimura and El Lindaman to advance to the quarter-finals, where he was eliminated by Kazusada Higuchi. Between November and December, Takeshita took part in the D-Oh Grand Prix 2021, where he won his block with a record of four wins and two losses, advancing to the finals. On December 27, Takeshita was defeated in the finals by Jun Akiyama.

In early 2021, Takeshita announced that All Out would disband with their last match taking place on March 12 in a special All Out-produced event. Their farewell match was a tag team match that Takeshita and Akito won against Katsumata and Iino.

==== The37Kamiina and sporadic appearances (2021–present) ====
On March 28, in the pre-show of Judgement, Takeshita and Katsumata were announced as entrants in the Ultimate Tag League 2021 where they would represent their new stable The37Kamiina. They won the league by defeating Daisuke Sasaki and Yuji Hino in a tie-breaker match on May 27. On June 26, on the Summer Vacation Tour in Osaka, Takeshita and Katsumata defeated Smile Pissari (Harashima and Yuji Okabayashi) to win the KO-D Tag Team Championship. Takeshita then took part in the 2021 King of DDT Tournament in which he defeated Akito, Mao and Daisuke Sasaki to reach the finals. In the finals on July 4, Takeshita defeated Yuji Hino, thus becoming the fourth two-time winner of the tournament. At Wrestle Peter Pan on August 21, Takeshita defeated Jun Akiyama to capture the KO-D Openweight Championship for the fifth time of his career. Takeshita later departed The37Kamiina after turning heel in AEW in 2023.

On July 27, 2023 at Wrestle Peter Pan, Takeshita defeated former The37Kamiina stablemate Yuki Ueno. On November 12 at Ultimate Party, Takeshita was defeated by Chris Jericho, who Takeshita was feuding with in AEW.

=== All Elite Wrestling (2021–present) ===
==== Early appearances (2021–2023) ====
During All Elite Wrestling's first-ever non-televised event called "The House Always Wins", Takeshita made his debut for the company in a 10-man tag team match. He teamed alongside members of The Elite, including AEW World Champion Kenny Omega, the former AEW World Tag Team Champions The Young Bucks, along with Michael Nakazawa. They lost the match against a team that consisted out of Death Triangle (Pac, Penta El Zero Miedo and Rey Fenix) and the brothers Mike and Matt Sydal. Takeshita then made his YouTube debut for AEW on Dark: Elevation the following Monday competing against Danny Limelight. He won this match with a pinfall after using his finishing move.

Takeshita returned to AEW on the April 25, 2022 episode of AEW Dark: Elevation where he defeated Brandon Cutler. On the May 4 episode AEW Dynamite, he was challenged by Jay Lethal to wrestle him on the next episode of AEW Rampage. On the May 6, 2022 episode of Rampage, Lethal would defeat Takeshita following assistance from his manager Sonjay Dutt and Satnam Singh. On the May 18 episode of Dynamite, he was defeated by AEW World Champion "Hangman" Adam Page in a non-title singles match, which was heavily praised by wrestling critics. Takeshita continued to gather wins on Elevation. On the July 6th episode of AEW Rampage, Takeshita lost to Eddie Kingston in a hard-hitting match. Takeshita's impressive matches up to this point earned him an AEW Interim World Championship Eliminator match against then interim champion Jon Moxley on the July 13 special episode of Dynamite titled Fyter Fest, which he lost. At Battle of the Belts III in August, Takeshita fought Claudio Castagnoli for his ROH World Championship, and was defeated. On November 19, it was confirmed that Takeshita had signed with the company, after his match against Eddie Kingston and Ortiz, while keeping his contract with DDT.

==== Don Callis Family (2023–2026) ====
At Double or Nothing on May 28, Takeshita aligned with Don Callis after they attacked Kenny Omega in the final moments of his match against Blackpool Combat Club, forming the Don Callis Family and turning heel in the process. At Blood and Guts, Takeshita, along with PAC and the Blackpool Combat Club were defeated by The Elite at the events' eponymous match, where both Takeshita and PAC walked out on the Blackpool Combat Club during the match. Takeshita would later go on to defeat Omega three times on pay per view in the span of two months- In a six-man tag team match at All In, in a singles match at All Out, and in another six-man tag team match at WrestleDream. After beating Omega at All Out, Callis gave Takeshita the moniker of "The Alpha". Due to Omega being forced to go on hiatus after being diagnosed with diverticulitis, Takeshita and The Don Callis Family began a feud with Chris Jericho, who Omega was aligned with. At Worlds End on December 30, Takeshita teamed with fellow Don Callis Family member Powerhouse Hobbs, Ricky Starks, and Big Bill in a losing effort to Jericho, Sammy Guevera, Sting, and Darby Allin.

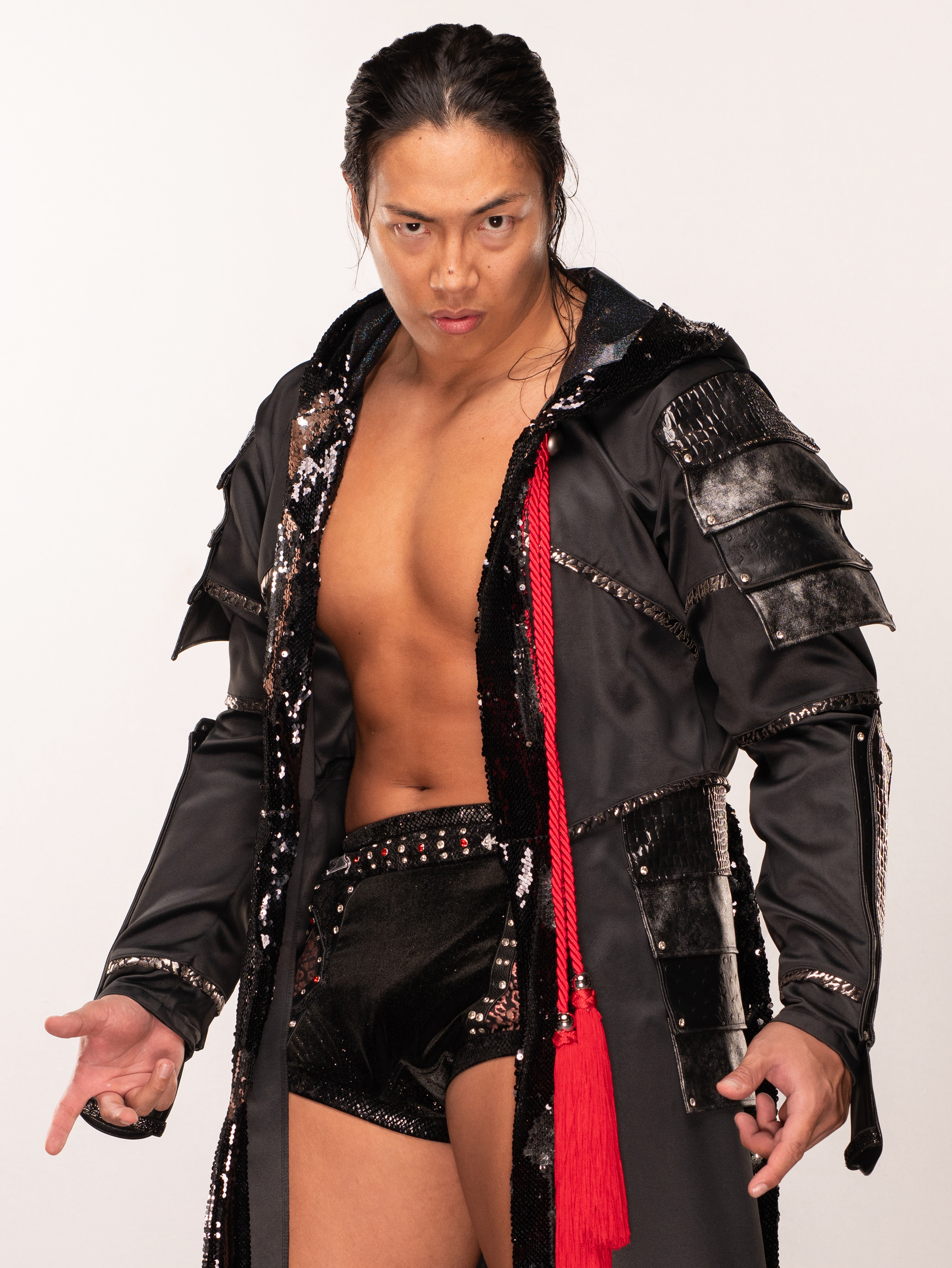
Takeshita in 2024

On the February 7, 2024 episode of Dynamite, Takeshita defeated Jericho, ending their feud and avenging his previous loss to him in DDT. On September 7 at All Out, Takeshita failed to capture the AEW Continental Championship in a four-way match, which Kazuchika Okada won and retained the title. During the AEW International Championship match between Will Ospreay and Ricochet on the fifth anniversary episode of Dynamite on October 2, Takeshita attacked both men causing it to end in a no contest. On October 12 at WrestleDream, Takeshita defeated Ospreay and Ricochet in a three-way match to win the International Championship for the first time and his first championship in AEW. On November 23 at Full Gear, Takeshita successfully defended his title against Ricochet. On December 28 at Worlds End, Takeshita successfully defended his title against Powerhouse Hobbs, who defected from the Don Callis Family a month prior.

On March 9 at Revolution, Takeshita lost the title to Kenny Omega, ending his reign at 148 days. In April, Takeshita participated in the men's bracket of the Owen Hart Cup, defeating Brody King in the quarter-final on Collision, but was eliminated in the semi-finals by Will Ospreay at Spring BreakThru. On May 25 at Double or Nothing, Takeshita teamed with stablemates Josh Alexander and Kyle Fletcher to defeat Paragon (Adam Cole, Kyle O'Reilly, and Roderick Strong). In June 2025, Takeshita and Fletcher formed a tag team called "Protoshita". On July 12 at All In, Takeshita competed in the men's Casino Gauntlet match, which was won by MJF. On September 20 at All Out, Takeshita failed to capture the AEW Unified Championship from Kazuchika Okada in a three-way match, involving Máscara Dorada. During this time, tensions began to develop between the two over their position in the Don Callis Family. On October 7 at Dynamite: Title Tuesday, Takeshita and Okada defeated the reigning AEW World Tag Team Champions Brodido (Brody King and Bandido) in a "Double Jeopardy Eliminator" match to earn a shot at the titles at WrestleDream on October 18. However the two failed to win the titles at the event after Okada attacked Takeshita mid-match. At Full Gear on November 22, Takeshita, Hechicero and Okada failed to win the CMLL World Trios Championship from El Sky Team (Místico, Máscara Dorada, and Neón) due to Takesita and Okada not being able to work together. Later in the show, Takeshita announced his entry into the 2025 Continental Classic, where he was placed in the Blue League. Takeshita finished the tournament at the top of his league with 13 points and advanced to the semi-finals at Worlds End on December 27. where he was eliminated by Okada after Okada used a screwdriver to get the win.

On February 14, 2026 at Grand Slam Australia, Takeshita wrestled Jon Moxley to a time limit draw for the Continential Championship. At Revolution on March 15, Takeshita failed to defeat Moxley in a no time limit rematch for the title.

==== Singles competition (2026–present) ====
Takeshita in August 2026 making his entrance during an AEW Dynamite episode.

After Revolution, Takeshita resumed his feud with stablemate Kazuchika Okada and agreed to team with Okada at Dynasty against The Young Bucks on the condition that he gets a shot at Okada's International Championship, later confirmed for Double or Nothing. On April 12 at Dynasty, Takeshita and Okada were defeated by The Young Bucks after Takeshita allowed The Young Bucks to hit the Meltzer Driver on Okada to win the match, teasing a face turn. On the May 13 episode of Dynamite, Takeshita unsuccessfully challenged Darby Allin for the AEW World Championship after refusing help from Don Callis.

At Double or Nothing on May 24, Takeshita defeated Okada to win the International Championship for a record-tying second time. Following the match, Takeshita was kicked out of the Don Callis Family by a returning Kyle Fletcher and turned face for the first time since 2023. On July 8 at Dynamite: Beach Break, Takeshita lost the International Championship to Fletcher, ending his second reign at 45 days. At All In on August 30, Takeshita failed to regain the title in a three-way match that was won by Okada. On the October 14 episode of Dynamite, Takeshita defeated Brian Cage to qualify for the Clockwork Carnage match for the AEW World Championship at WrestleDream. At the event on October 17, Takeshita failed to win the title after being eliminated in the first stage by Okada.

=== New Japan Pro-Wrestling (2024–present) ===
Takeshita during the G1 Climax 36 tour in August 2026

From July 20 to August 12, Takeshita participated in New Japan Pro-Wrestling's 2024 G1 Climax, his first G1 Climax tournament. On August 14, he finished the tournament with a record of five wins and four losses, advancing to the B block play-off match to decide the semifinalists of the tournament. On August 15, Takeshita was defeated by Yota Tsuji in the play-off match, failing to advance to the semifinals of the tournament.

On January 4, 2025 at Wrestle Kingdom 19, Takeshita defeated Shingo Takagi to win the NEVER Openweight Championship in a Winner Takes All match that also involved Takeshita's AEW International Championship. After successfully defending his championship against Tomohiro Ishii one day later at Wrestle Dynasty, Takeshita announced that he had also been signed to NJPW whilst remaining under contract with AEW and DDT. On April 5 at Sakura Genesis, Takeshita successfully defended his NEVER Openweight Championship against Ryohei Oiwa. On April 11 at Windy City Riot, Takeshita defeated Hiroshi Tanahashi in Tanahashi's final match in the United States. At Dominion 6.15 in Osaka-jo Hall, Takeshita lost his title to Boltin Oleg, ending his reign at 162 days. From July 19, 2025 till August 17, 2025, Takeshita participated in G1 Climax 35, where he advanced out of the B Block with a 6—3 record, defeated David Finlay in the playoffs, Zack Sabre Jr. in the semifinals, and then Evil in the final, making him the first contracted AEW and DDT wrestler to win the G1 tournament. At King of Pro-Wrestling on October 13, Takeshita successfully cashed in his guaranteed IWGP Heavyweight Championship title shot, granted by virtue of winning the G1 Climax, to win the title from Zack Sabre Jr. On November 2 at Final Homecoming, Takeshita successfully defended his title against Hirooki Goto.

On January 4, 2026, at Wrestle Kingdom 20, Takeshita lost his title to IWGP Global Heavyweight Champion Yota Tsuji in a Winner Takes All Match, ending his reign at 83 days. On February 27 at The New Beginning USA, Takeshita defeated El Phantasmo to win the NJPW World Television Championship. After retaining the title against Shota Umino in a time-limit draw on April 4 at Sakura Genesis, Takeshita was confronted by an unknown masked wrestler before being attacked by Chase Owens. On Night 2 of Wrestling Dontaku on 4 May, Takeshita successfully defended his title against Owens and was attacked by the masked wrestler who revealed himself to be the returning Sanada. In his post-match comments, Takeshita announced he would be joining the main Hontai unit of NJPW. On June 14 at Dominion 6.14 in Osaka-jo Hall, Takeshita successfully defended his title against Sanada. From July to August, Takeshita competed in the G1 Climax as part of A Block, where he finished with 12 points but failed to advance to the semi-finals due to losing tiebreakers to Ryohei Oiwa and Yota Tsuji. On September 27 at Destruction in Kobe, Takeshita lost the NJPW World Television Championship to Shun Skywalker, ending his reign at 212 days.

=== Consejo Mundial de Lucha Libre (2025–present) ===
On February 19, 2025, Takeshita was announced to make his debut for Consejo Mundial de Lucha Libre (CMLL) on February 28, where he successfully defended his NEVER Openweight Championship against Ángel de Oro at the Arena México. On June 19, 2026 at Fantastica Mania Mexico, Takeshita teamed with Hechicero to defeat Los Guerreros Laguneros (Último Guerrero and Gran Guerrero).

== Personal life ==
In February 2014, Takeshita was admitted into the Nippon Sport Science University. He wrote his thesis about the mechanics of the German suplex. His hobbies include weightlifting and bodybuilding. Takeshita has stated that his goal was to take part in the 2020 Tokyo Summer Olympics as a decathlete.

In May 2025, Takeshita revealed that he had married fellow wrestler Yuka Sakazaki. The two have a goldendoodle named Kenshiro.

== Championships and accomplishments ==
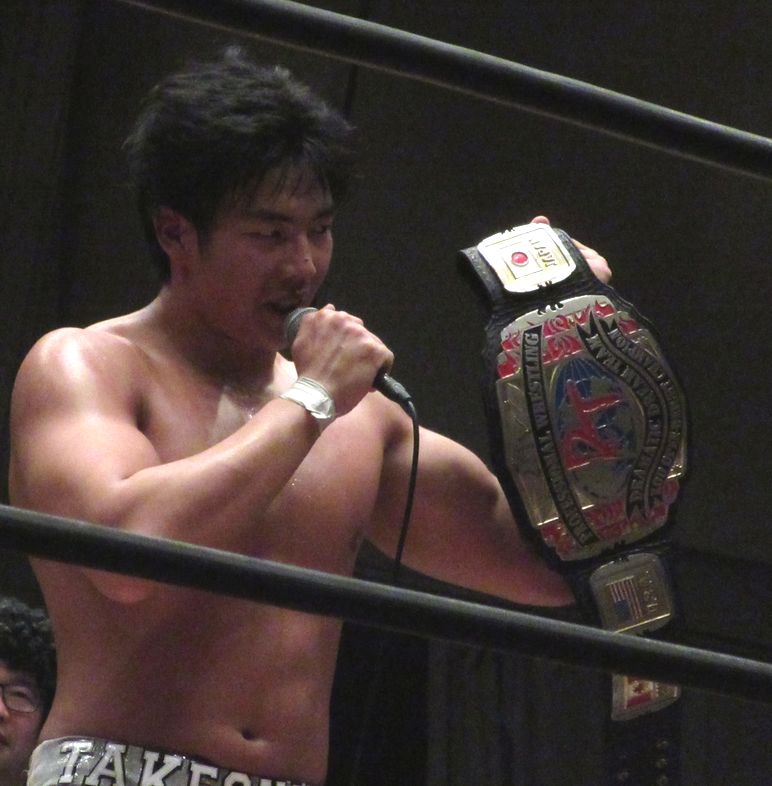
Takeshita holding the KO-D Openweight Championship belt in May 2016

- All Elite Wrestling
  - AEW International Championship (2 times)
- DDT Pro-Wrestling
  - Ironman Heavymetalweight Championship (4 times)
  - KO-D 6-Man Tag Team Championship (5 times) – with Antonio Honda and Tetsuya Endo (1), Akito and Diego (1), Akito and Shunma Katsumata (1), Akito and Yuki Iino (1), and Shunma Katsumata and Yuki Iino (1)
  - KO-D Openweight Championship (5 times)
  - KO-D Tag Team Championship (4 times) – with Tetsuya Endo (2), Mike Bailey (1) and Shunma Katsumata (1)
  - KO-D Openweight Championship Challenger Decision Tournament (2017)
  - KO-D Tag Team Championship Tournament (2015) – with Tetsuya Endo
  - D-Oh Grand Prix (2019, 2021 II)
  - King of DDT Tournament (2019, 2021)
  - Ultimate Tag League (2021) – with Shunma Katsumata
- Deadlock Pro-Wrestling
  - DPW Awards (2 times)
    - Moment of the Year (2022) – Yelling "Let's fucking go" at Fire
    - Match of the Year (2022) – vs. Andrew Everett at Believe The Hype
- ESPN
  - Ranked No. 8 of the 30 best Pro Wrestlers Under 30 in 2023
- Japan Indie Awards
  - Best Bout Award (2014) with Tetsuya Endo vs. Kenny Omega and Kota Ibushi on September 28
  - MVP Award (2021)
- New Japan Pro Wrestling
  - IWGP Heavyweight Championship (1 time) (Note: During Takeshita's reign, the title was called the IWGP World Heavyweight Championship.)
  - IWGP Intercontinental Championship (1 time) (Note: With the reactivation of the IWGP Heavyweight Championship and the restored and combined histories of both it, the World Heavyweight, and the Intercontinental titles, all former IWGP World Heavyweight Champions are retroactively recognized as having been an IWGP Intercontinental Champion.)
  - NEVER Openweight Championship (1 time)
  - NJPW World Television Championship (1 time)
  - G1 Climax (2025)
  - Ninth NJPW Triple Crown Champion
- Pro Wrestling Illustrated
  - Faction of the Year (2025) as part of the Don Callis Family
  - Ranked No. 17 of the top 500 singles wrestlers in the PWI 500 in 2025
- Tokyo Sports
  - Newcomer Award (2013)
  - Fighting Spirit Award (2021)
  - Outstanding Performance Award (2025)
- Toshikoshi Puroresu
  - Shuffle Tag Tournament (2015) – with Daisuke Sekimoto
  - Shuffle Tag Tournament (2017) – with Hideki Suzuki
  - Toshiwasure! Shuffle Tag Tournament (2018) – with Yuko Miyamoto
- Wrestling Observer Newsletter
  - Most Underrated (2022, 2024)
  - Most Outstanding Wrestler (2025)
- Other accomplishments
  - Differ Cup (2017) – with Yuki Ueno
