= Champion Carnival =

All Japan Pro Wrestling tournament

- The Champion Carnival trophy in 2021
- Promotions: All Japan Pro Wrestling
- First event: 1973

The Champion Carnival (Japanese: チャンピオン・カーニバル, Hepburn: Chanpion Kānibaru) is a professional wrestling tournament held by All Japan Pro Wrestling (AJPW). The tournament is also known by the nickname Haru no Saiten (春の祭典; "Spring Festival") and is sometimes abbreviated to CC. Created by AJPW founder Giant Baba, the tournament has been held annually since 1973 and is the longest-running singles tournament in professional wrestling, while also ranking as the most prestigious event in the AJPW calendar. It is considered a successor to the World League, held by Japan Pro Wrestling Alliance (JWA) between 1959 and 1972, predating the New Japan Pro-Wrestling (NJPW) G1 Climax tournament by a year.

The tournament is held in a round-robin format, where all participating wrestlers face each other once with the winner being awarded two points and the loser none. A draw results in both wrestlers being awarded a point. After all wrestlers have faced each other once, the top two wrestlers advance to the final to determine the tournament winner.

Baba himself holds the record for most Champion Carnival wins, having won the tournament seven times. Other notable winners include Abdullah the Butcher, Jumbo Tsuruta, Keiji Muto, Mitsuharu Misawa, Stan Hansen, Toshiaki Kawada and Kento Miyahara. Four wrestlers have won both the Champion Carnival and the G1 Climax: Muto, Satoshi Kojima, Kensuke Sasaki and Yuji Nagata, with Kojima the only one to win them alongside Fire Festival and Nagata the only one to win them alongside the Global League.

== History ==
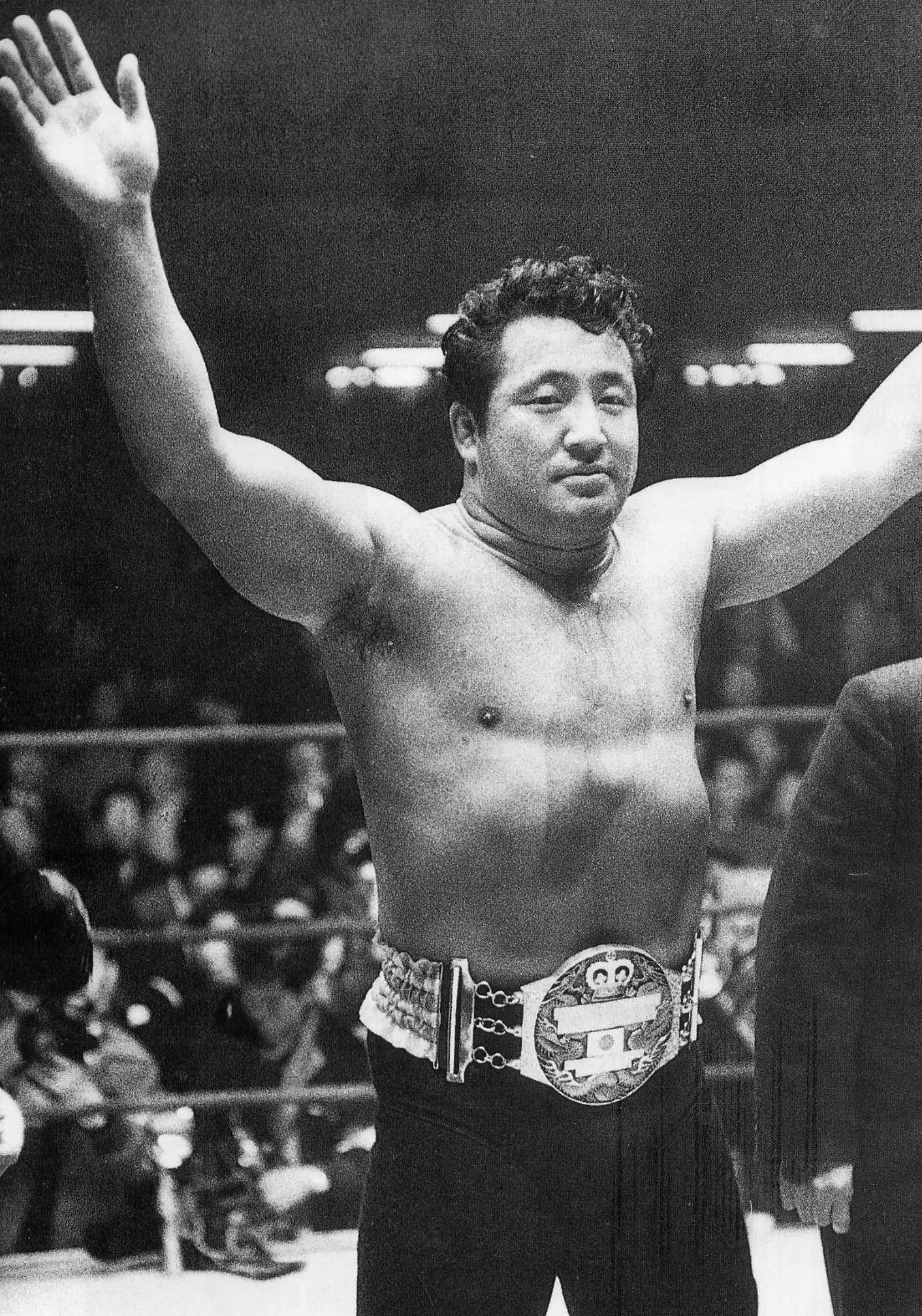
Rikidōzan, the creator of the original World League

From 1959 to 1972, the Japan Pro Wrestling Alliance (JWA), run by Rikidōzan, held a tournament called World League (also known as the "World Big League"), which featured both Japanese and foreign professional wrestlers. Rikidōzan himself dominated the annual tournament early on, however, after his death in 1963, the tournament was won six times by Giant Baba and once by Antonio Inoki. JWA folded shortly after both Baba and Inoki left the promotion to create All Japan Pro Wrestling (AJPW) and New Japan Pro-Wrestling (NJPW), respectively. Both men took the concept of World League with them to their new promotions, with Baba creating the "Champion Carnival" in 1973 and Inoki creating the World League in 1974, later renaming it G1 Climax.

The first Champion Carnival took place only six months after Baba had founded AJPW. The initial tournament was held in a single-elimination format and was intended for AJPW's heavyweight wrestlers such as Hiro Matsuda, Samson Kutsuwada and Thunder Sugiyama. For the tournament, Baba also recruited several foreign wrestlers, such as Baron Scicluna, The Destroyer, King Curtis Iaukea and Mark Lewin. Baba himself won the inaugural tournament, defeating Lewin in the final. A year later, AJPW presented the second Champion Carnival, which most notably introduced former Olympian Jumbo Tsuruta, who eventually went on to become one of the promotion's top names. Baba also won the second Champion Carnival, this time defeating Mr. Wrestling in the final. Heading into the 1975 Champion Carnival, Baba changed the tournament's format. Now the four wrestlers who advanced to the semifinals in the single-elimination tournament were put into a round-robin tournament, where the wrestler with the best record would be declared the winner. Baba went on to win the tournament for the third year in a row, defeating Gene Kiniski in the final. A year later, the single-elimination portion of the tournament was eliminated and the Champion Carnival was changed to a pure round-robin tournament, a format it holds to this day. The 1976 tournament was the first Champion Carnival not won by Baba. It was instead won by Canadian Abdullah the Butcher, who defeated Baba in the final. Baba went on to win the tournament four more times, winning a total of seven out of the ten first Champion Carnivals. In early 1980s, AJPW loaded the Champion Carnival with some of the top foreign wrestlers in the world, including Billy Robinson, Bruiser Brody, Dick Slater, Jack Brisco, Stan Hansen, Ted DiBiase and Terry Funk. However, after rival promotion NJPW took over as the number one promotion in Japan with a record-breaking business streak, AJPW decided to put the Champion Carnival on hiatus, not wanting the tournament to be overshadowed by their competitors. The hiatus lasted from 1983 to 1991.

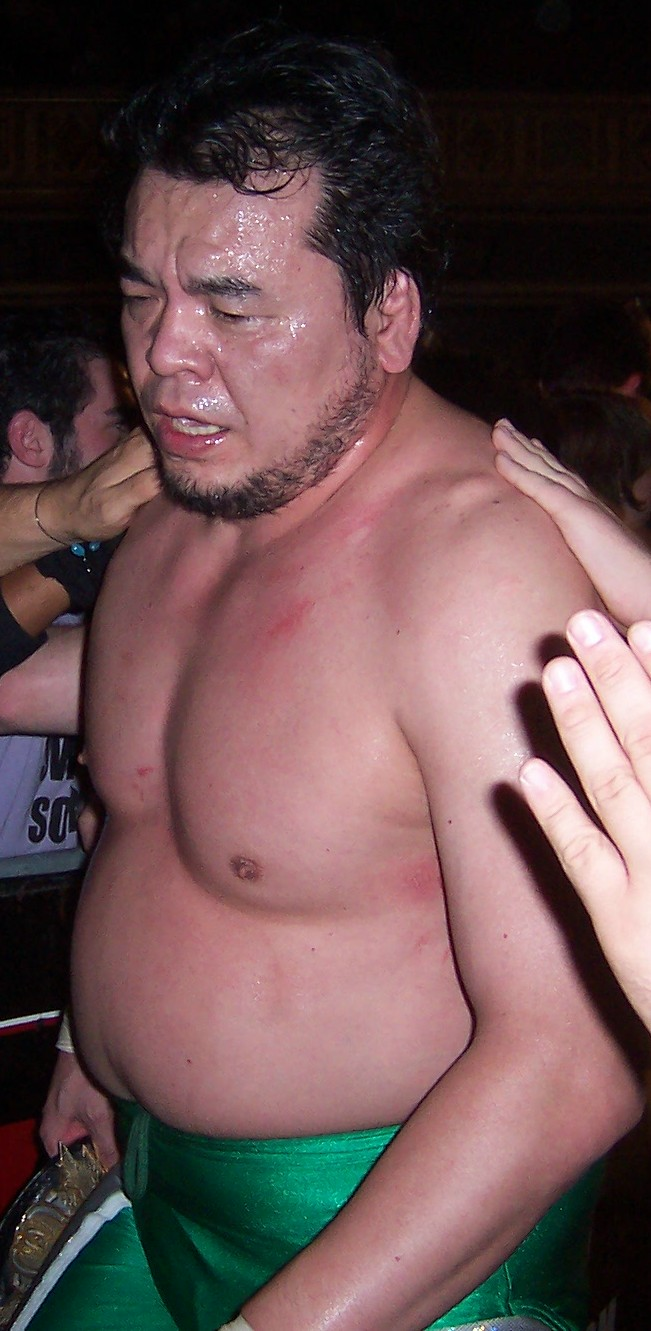
Mitsuharu Misawa, a two-time winner of the tournament, who took over its booking after Giant Baba's death

In 1991, AJPW had overtaken NJPW and was again the top promotion in Japan, boasting a roster of top foreign wrestlers mixed with top Japanese wrestlers. The 1991 tournament showcased several younger wrestlers, including Kenta Kobashi, Mitsuharu Misawa and Toshiaki Kawada, who bypassed the promotion's aging veterans and went on to become the promotion's cornerstones for the next decade. However, despite the emergence of the younger wrestlers and the participation of foreign wrestlers such as Doug Furnas, The Dynamite Kid, Johnny Ace, Johnny Smith and Mick Foley, the 1991 tournament was won by an AJPW veteran Jumbo Tsuruta, who defeated Stan Hansen in the final. The 1992 tournament was booked around the storyline of the "young lions" challenging the veterans for AJPW supremacy. Stan Hansen went on to win his first Champion Carnival, defeating Mitsuharu Misawa in the final. Despite losing in the final, the tournament made Misawa a star, someone earmarked to occupy the promotion's top spot. A year later, Hansen again defeated Misawa in the final. The 1993 tournament was also noteworthy for introducing rookie Jun Akiyama. In 1994, Toshiaki Kawada became the first of the "young lions" to win the Champion Carnival, defeating "Dr. Death" Steve Williams in the final, a match that has been called "arguably the greatest Carnival tournament match of all time". For the next several years the tournament was dominated by AJPW's younger wrestlers with Kawada repeating his win, Mitsuharu Misawa winning two tournaments and Kenta Kobashi one tournament. The 1997 tournament ended in a rare three-way draw between Kawada, Kobashi and Misawa, resulting in a round-robin playoff between the three, where Kawada emerged victorious.

On January 31, 1999, Giant Baba died, leaving the promotion in the hands of Mitsuharu Misawa. The 1999 Champion Carnival was the first one not booked by Baba. As the new booker, Misawa made a controversial decision to leave Stan Hansen out of the tournament, while giving Vader the win in the final over Kenta Kobashi. Problems between Misawa and Giant Baba's widow Motoko Baba led to Misawa exiting AJPW in 2000, taking 26 out of the 28 Japanese AJPW wrestlers with him to form the new Pro Wrestling Noah promotion. Struggling to cope with the loss of the majority of its roster, AJPW eventually hired NJPW wrestler Keiji Muto to lead the promotion. Muto went on to win the Champion Carnival three times (2002, 2004 and 2007), before leaving the promotion in 2013, after which he was replaced by Jun Akiyama. 2013 also saw Akiyama finally win his first Champion Carnival, twenty years after his debut appearance in the tournament.

In recent years, several outsiders have won the tournament, with freelancer Minoru Suzuki winning it in 2009 and 2010, NJPW representative Yuji Nagata winning it in 2011, Big Japan Pro Wrestling (BJW) representative Daisuke Sekimoto winning it in 2016, freelancer Shuji Ishikawa winning it in 2017, and Pro Wrestling Noah representative Naomichi Marufuji winning it in 2018.

On April 2, 2020, AJPW held a press conference, delaying this year's Champion Carnival, due to the COVID-19 pandemic. On May 28, they confirmed that the tournament has been moved to September.

== List of winners ==
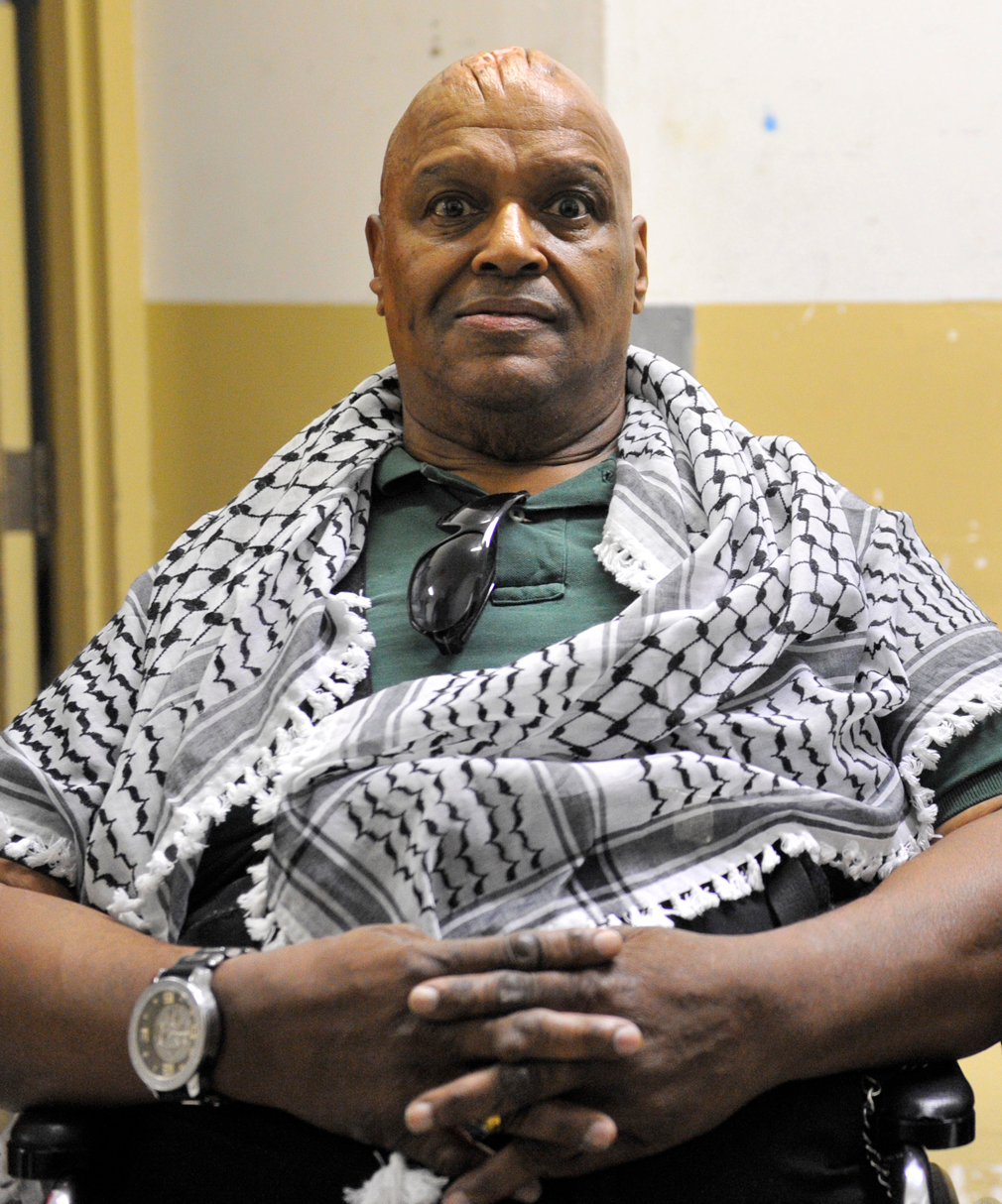
Abdullah the Butcher, a two-time and the first non-Japanese winner of the tournament

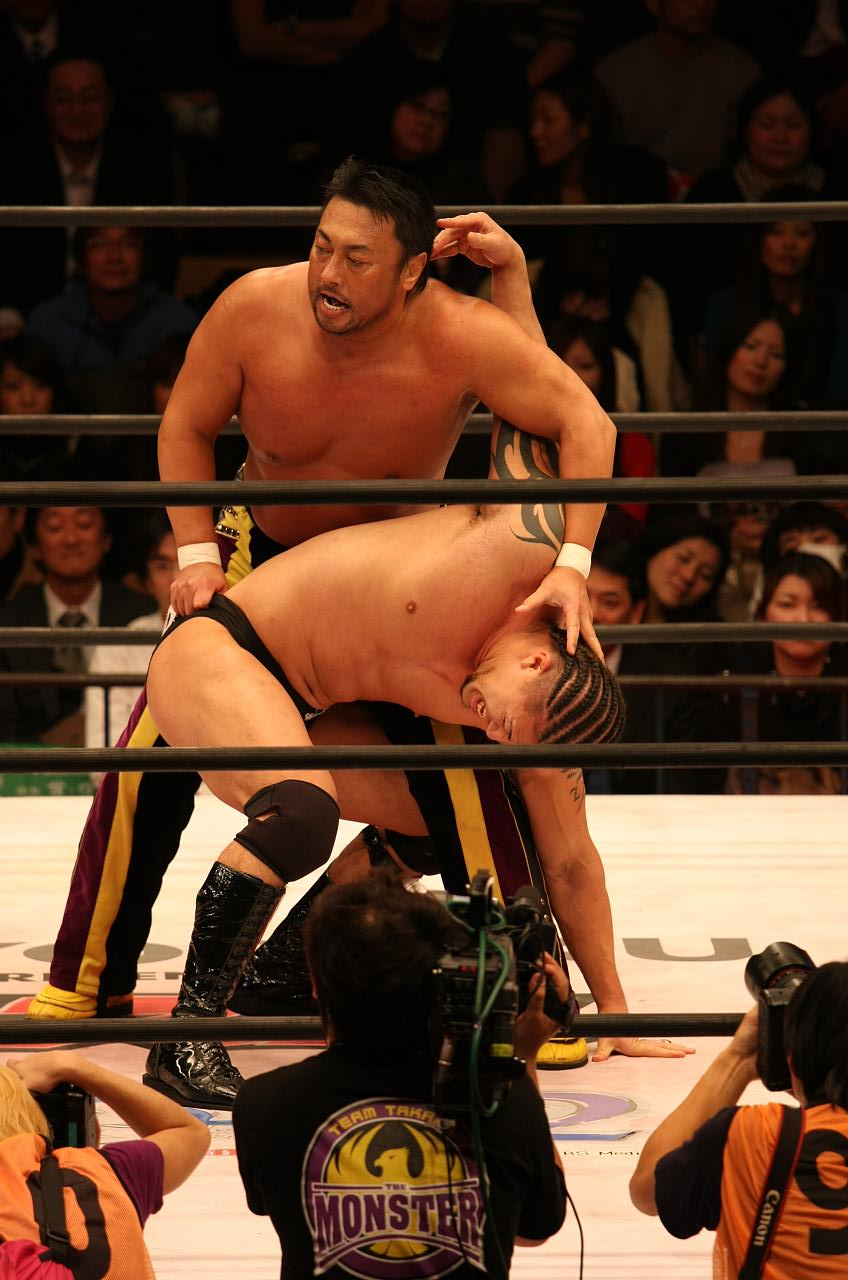
Toshiaki Kawada (top), a two-time winner of the tournament

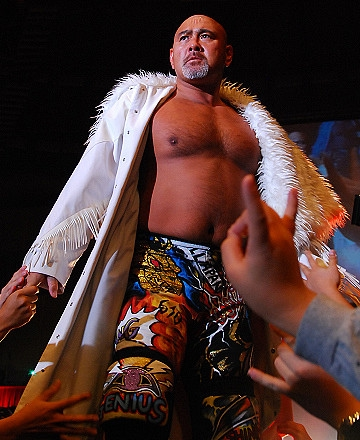
Keiji Muto, a three-time winner of the tournament

Year	Winner	Total won	Reference
1973	Giant Baba	1	
1974	Giant Baba	2	
1975	Giant Baba	3	
1976	Abdullah the Butcher	1	
1977	Giant Baba	4	
1978	Giant Baba	5	
1979	Abdullah the Butcher	2	
1980	Jumbo Tsuruta	1	
1981	Giant Baba	6	
1982	Giant Baba	7	
1991	Jumbo Tsuruta	2	
1992	Stan Hansen	1	
1993	Stan Hansen	2	
1994	Toshiaki Kawada	1	
1995	Mitsuharu Misawa	1	
1996	Akira Taue	1	
1997	Toshiaki Kawada	2	
1998	Mitsuharu Misawa	2	
1999	Vader	1	
2000	Kenta Kobashi	1	
2001	Genichiro Tenryu	1	
2002	Keiji Muto	1	
2003	Satoshi Kojima	1	
2004	Keiji Muto	2	
2005	Kensuke Sasaki	1	
2006	Taiyō Kea	1	
2007	Keiji Muto	3	
2008	Suwama	1	
2009	Minoru Suzuki	1	
2010	Minoru Suzuki	2	
2011	Yuji Nagata	1	
2012	Taiyō Kea	2	
2013	Jun Akiyama	1	
2014	Takao Omori	1	
2015	Akebono	1	
2016	Daisuke Sekimoto	1	
2017	Shuji Ishikawa	1	
2018	Naomichi Marufuji	1	
2019	Kento Miyahara	1	
2020	Zeus	1	
2021	Jake Lee	1	
2022	Yuma Aoyagi	1	
2023	Shotaro Ashino	1	
2024	Kento Miyahara	2	
2025	Rei Saito	1	
2026	Hideki Suzuki	1	

== 1973 ==
The 1973 Champion Carnival is the first edition of the Champion Carnival. It took place from March 17 to April 21, featuring fifteen wrestlers in a single-elimination format. Giant Baba received a first-round bye, and was the inaugural winner of the tournament.

Round 1 March 18 to April 4
Matty Suzuki	Pin
Calypso Hurricane	13:41
King Curtis Iaukea	Pin
Thunder Sugiyama	11:40
Moose Morowski	Pin
Motoshi Okuma	12:17
Baron Mikel Scicluna	Pin
Samson Kutsuwada	14:49
The Mad Russian	Sub
The Destroyer	20:48
Hiro Matsuda	Sub
Antonio Pugliese	16:07
Mashio Koma	Sub
Mark Lewin	17:31

Round 2 April 3 to April 10
Calypso Hurricane	Pin
Giant Baba	18:45
King Curtis Iaukea	Pin
Moose Morowski	12:27
Baron Mikel Scicluna	Sub
The Destroyer	19:22
Hiro Matsuda	Sub
Mark Lewin	21:55

Semifinals; April 10, 14 and 19
Giant Baba	Pin
King Curtis Iaukea	11:49
The Destroyer	Pin^{1}
Mark Lewin	20:04

Final; April 21
Giant Baba	2^{2}
Mark Lewin	1 (19:20)

^{1}This match originally ended in a no-contest on April 10, so a rematch was scheduled for April 14 to determine the 1st finalist with Mark Lewin winning.
^{2}The finals were contested under best of 3 falls rules, with Baba winning the first fall at 12:49 and Lewin winning the second fall at 16:55. Baba won the third and decisive fall at 19:20, thus becoming the inaugural Champion Carnival winner.

== 1974 ==
The 1974 Champion Carnival is the second edition of the Champion Carnival. It took place from April 13 to May 11, featuring fifteen wrestlers in a single-elimination format. Giant Baba emerging as the winner after defeating Mr. Wrestling in the final match. It was Baba's second tournament win.

Round 1 April 13 to April 27
Jumbo Tsuruta	Pin
Joe Soto	10:28
Abdullah The Butcher	DDQ^{1}
The Destroyer
Thunder Sugiyama	Pin
Sailor White	12:04
Mr. Wrestling	Sub
Matty Suzuki	14:50
Mark Lewin	Pin
Akihisa Takachio	14:50
Samson Kutsuwada	Sub
Rufus Jones	14:15
King Iaukea	Pin
Mashio Koma	5:08

Round 2 April 22 to April 28
Jumbo Tsuruta
BYE
Thunder Sugiyama	Sub
Mr. Wrestling	14:17
Mark Lewin	Pin
Samson Kutsuwada	16:24
King Iaukea	Pin
Giant Baba	4:48

Semifinals; April 30 to May 5
Jumbo Tsuruta	Referee Decision
Mr. Wrestling	28:32
Mark Lewin	Pin
Giant Baba	17:28

Final; May 11
Mr. Wrestling	1^{2}
Giant Baba	2 (14:20)

^{1}The first round match between Destroyer and Abdullah was so rough that it was impossible for the match to take place, and both were disqualified due to four consecutive no-contests.
^{2}The finals were contested under best of 3 falls rules, with Wrestling winning the first fall at 8:30 and Baba winning the second fall at 11:15. Baba won the third and decisive fall at 14:20, thus becoming the second Champion Carnival winner.

== 1975 ==
The 1975 Champion Carnival is the third edition of the Champion Carnival. It took place from April 5 to May 3, featuring fourteen wrestlers in a unique single-elimination format with repechage and a final round-robin league. Giant Baba emerged as the winner after defeating Gene Kiniski in the final match. It was Baba's third tournament win.

Round 1 April 6, 10, 14
Gene Kiniski	Sub
Motoshi Okuma	8:45
Bob Orton Jr.	Pin^{1}
Jumbo Tsuruta	13:01

Round 2 April 23
Gene Kiniski	Pin
Jumbo Tsuruta	21:25

Round 1 April 8, 15
Steve Keirn	Sub
The Destroyer	11:18
Mike George	Sub
Akihisa Takachiho	9:52

Round 2 April 19
The Destroyer	Pin
Akihisa Takachiho	15:28

Round 1 April 5, 7, 13, 16
Killer Kowalski	Pin
Great Kojika	13:42
Mark Lewin	Count-Out ^{2}
Giant Baba	13:33

Round 2 April 18, 21
Killer Kowalski	Pin
Giant Baba	26:39

Round 1 April 9		Round 2 April 27
Mr. Wrestling	Sub
Samson Kutsuwada	8:49
Samson Kutsuwada	8:49	Mr. Wrestling	Count-Out
		Jumbo Tsuruta	16:09

Repechage (Block D)
Jumbo Tsuruta	4
Killer Kowalski	2
Akihisa Takachiho	0

	Tsuruta	Takachiho	Kowalski
Tsuruta	—N/a	Tsuruta (14:39)	Tsuruta (17:15)
Takachiho	Tsuruta (14:39)	—N/a	Kowalski (11:34)
Kowalski	Tsuruta (17:15)	Kowalski (11:34)	—N/a

Final League
Giant Baba	6
Gene Kiniski	4
The Destroyer	2
Mr. Wrestling	0

	Kiniski	Destroyer	Baba	Wrestling
Kiniski	—N/a	Kiniski (16:57)	Baba (18:39)^{3}	Kiniski (17:45)
Destroyer	Kiniski (16:57)	—N/a	Baba (20:13)	Destroyer (Forfeit)
Baba	Baba (18:39)^{3}	Baba (20:13)	—N/a	Baba (24:10)
Wrestling	Kiniski (17:45)	Destroyer (Forfeit)	Baba (24:10)	—N/a

^{1}This match originally ended in a time limit draw on April 6, so a rematch was scheduled for April 10 to determine the winner with Jumbo Tsuruta winning.
^{2}This match originally ended in a no-contest on April 5, so a rematch was scheduled for April 6 to determine the winner but the match ended with double count-out, so a rematch was scheduled for April 12 to determine the winner with Giant Baba winning.
^{3}This match was contested under best of 3 falls rules, with Baba winning the first fall at 12:12 and Kiniski winning the second fall at 15:14. Baba won the third and decisive fall at 18:39, thus becoming the third Champion Carnival winner.

== 1976 ==
The 1976 Champion Carnival took place from April 7 to March 8, featuring fourteen wrestlers in a round-robin format. The tournament was won by Abdullah the Butcher, who defeated Giant Baba via disqualification in the finals. It was Butcher's first tournament win.

Final standings
Abdullah the Butcher	18
Giant Baba	18
Barracuda	17
Jumbo Tsuruta	17
Kintarō Ōki	17
The Destroyer	16
King Curtis Iaukea	16
The Beast	9
Samson Kutsuwada	9
Great Kojika	7
Buddy Wolfe	6
Motoshi Okuma	6
Larry Lane	4
Larry Sharpe	0

	Abdullah	Baba	Barracuda	Beast	Destroyer	Iaukea	Kojika	Kutsuwada	Lane	Okuma	Ōki	Sharpe	Wolfe	Tsuruta
Abdullah	—N/a	DCO (9:08)	Abdullah (7:12)	Abdullah (9:18)	Abdullah (5:12)	No-Contest (8:00)	Abdullah (8:05)	Abdullah (3:42)	Abdullah (3:18)	Abdullah (3:32)	DCO (6:12)	Abdullah (1:52)	Abdullah (2:13)	DCO (9:59)
Baba	DCO (9:08)	—N/a	Baba (12:24)	Draw (30:00)	Draw (30:00)	Iaukea (4:45)	Baba (8:09)	Baba (5:14)	Baba (10:46)	Baba (9:08)	DCO (8:21)	Baba (6:59)	Baba (9:01)	Baba (26:15)
Barracuda	Abdullah (7:12)	Baba (12:24)	—N/a	Barracuda (13:07)	Destroyer (15:17)	DCO (7:40)	Barracuda (17:49)	Barracuda (10:05)	Barracuda (11:40)	Barracuda (8:52)	Barracuda (11:40)	Barracuda (11:40)	Oki (12:46)	Draw (30:00)
Beast	Abdullah (9:18)	Draw (30:00)	DCO (13:55)	Duk (11:10)	—N/a	Duk (9:47)	Duk (17:17)	Duk (5:50)	Duk (13:24)	Duk (13:48)	Duk (10:12)	Duk (15:46)	Oki (Forfeit)	DCO (12:21)
Destroyer	Abdullah (5:12)	Draw (30:00)	Destroyer (15:17)	—N/a	DCO (13:55)	Destroyer (12:55)	Destroyer (11:42)	Iaukea (5:00)	DCO (17:12)	Destroyer (16:58)	Destroyer (16:35)	Destroyer (15:50)	Destroyer (12:17)	Destroyer (11:06)
Iaukea	No-Contest (8:00)	Iaukea (4:45)	DCO (7:40)	Iaukea (8:47)	Duk (5:50)	Iaukea (6:05)	Iaukea (5:10)	—N/a	DCO (4:21)	Iaukea (5:49)	Iaukea (7:42)	Iaukea (4:46)	Oki (3:46)	Iaukea (5:35)
Kojika	Abdullah (8:05)	Baba (9:08)	Destroyer (16:58)	DiBiase (11:05)	Duk (13:48)	Kojika (8:57)	DCO (21:05)	Iaukea (5:49)	Jonathan (12:00)	—N/a	Kojika (7:58)	DCO (14:19)	Oki (12:02)	Terror (Forfeit)
Kutsuwada	Abdullah (3:42)	Baba (1:16)	Destroyer (16:35)	DiBiase (8:59)	Duk (10:12)	DCO (9:42)	Hata (Forfeit)	Iaukea (7:42)	Jonathan (13:29)	Kojika (7:58)	—N/a	Okuma (8:53)	Oki (6:08)	Terror (8:29)
Lane	Abdullah (3:18)	Baba (10:46)	Barracuda (11:40)	DiBiase (9:10)	Duk (9:47)	—N/a	Hata (7:40)	Iaukea (6:05)	Jonathan (14:19)	Kojika (8:57)	DCO (9:42)	Graham (8:58)	Oki (8:37)	Terror (9:27)
Okuma	Abdullah (3:32)	Baba (5:53)	Destroyer (15:50)	DiBiase (12:15)	Duk (15:46)	Graham (8:58)	Okuma (16:23)	Iaukea (4:46)	Jonathan (5:15)	DCO (14:19)	Okuma (8:53)	—N/a	Oki (11:11)	Terror (10:30)
Ōki	DCO (6:12)	Oki (7:45)	Barracuda (11:40)	Oki (12:46)	Oki (Forfeit)	Oki (8:37)	Oki (13:10)	Oki (3:46)	DCO (8:35)	Oki (12:02)	Oki (6:08)	Oki (11:11)	—N/a	Oki (4:05)
Sharpe	Abdullah (1:52)	Baba (6:59)	Barracuda (11:40)	Jonathan (14:20)	Duk (13:24)	Jonathan (14:19)	Jonathan (8:40)	DCO (4:21)	—N/a	Jonathan (12:00)	Jonathan (13:29)	Jonathan (5:15)	DCO (8:35)	Jonathan (8:33)
Wolfe	Abdullah (2:13)	Baba (9:01)	Destroyer (11:06)	Terror (8:20)	DCO (12:21)	Terror (9:27)	Terror (9:41)	Iaukea (5:35)	Jonathan (8:33)	Terror (Forfeit)	Terror (8:29)	Oki (4:05)	—N/a	Tsuruta (9:45)
Tsuruta	DCO (9:59)	Baba (26:15)	Tsuruta (29:50)	Tsuruta (14:16)	Draw (30:00)	Tsuruta (11:25)	Tsuruta (15:59)	Tsuruta (7:02)	Jonathan (13:56)	Tsuruta (21:14)	Tsuruta (8:24)	Tsuruta (16:28)	Tsuruta (7:08)	—N/a

Final
Abdullah the Butcher	DQ
Giant Baba	9:53

== 1977 ==
The 1977 Champion Carnival took place from April 8 to May 14, featuring fifteen wrestlers in a round-robin format. The tournament was won by Giant Baba, who defeated Jumbo Tsuruta in the finals. It was Baba's fourth tournament win.

Final standings
Jumbo Tsuruta	21
Abdullah the Butcher	20
Giant Baba	20
The Destroyer	17
Kintarō Ōki	16
Bull Ramos	16
Super Destroyer	16
Akihisa Takachiho	12
Samson Kutsuwada	11
Great Kojika	10
Motoshi Okuma	9
Jim Dillon	6
Bill White	4
José González	2
Red Wolf	0

	Abdullah	Baba	Destroyer	Dillon	González	Kutsuwada	Kojika	Okuma	Ōki	Ramos	Super	Takachiho	Tsuruta	White	Wolf
Abdullah	—N/a	DCO (9:42)	DCO (11:46)	Abdullah (2:46)	Abdullah (2:25)	Abdullah (8:45)	Abdullah (4:26)	Abdullah (4:48)	DCO (10:58)	DCO (4:45)	Abdullah (4:08)	Abdullah (4:12)	Abdullah (11:15)	Abdullah (3:15)	Abdullah (1:58)
Baba	DCO (9:42)	—N/a	Draw (30:00)	DCO (6:26)	Baba (7:27)	Baba (12:48)	Baba (14:48)	Baba (7:55)	DCO (11:43)	Baba (3:08)	Baba (11:36)	Baba (12:02)	Draw (30:00)	Baba (8:07)	Baba (4:58)
Destroyer	DCO (11:46)	Draw (30:00)	—N/a	Destroyer (13:48)	Destroyer (15:02)	Destroyer (15:12)	Destroyer (15:59)	Destroyer (20:12)	DCO (17:12)	DCO (4:56)	Destroyer (13:04)	Destroyer (14:16)	Tsuruta (22:04)	DCO (13:21)	Destroyer (9:10)
Dillon	Abdullah (2:46)	DCO (6:26)	Destroyer (13:48)	—N/a	Dillon (16:08)	Kutsuwada (17:28)	Kojika (13:46)	DCO (13:55)	Oki (11:06)	Ramos (9:34)	Super (12:14)	Takachiho (14:10)	Tsuruta (16:25)	Dillon (13:43)	Dillon (10:19)
González	Abdullah (2:25)	Baba (7:27)	Destroyer (15:02)	Dillon (16:08)	—N/a	Kutsuwada (15:25)	Kojika (13:12)	Okuma (14:44)	Oki (12:35)	Ramos (forfeit)	Super (8:59)	Takachiho (11:47)	Tsuruta (15:03)	White (16:06)	Gonzalez (12:48)
Kutsuwada	Abdullah (8:45)	Baba (12:48)	Destroyer (15:12)	Kutsuwada (17:28)	Kutsuwada (15:25)	—N/a	Hata (7:40)	Iaukea (6:05)	Jonathan (14:19)	Kojika (8:57)	DCO (9:42)	Graham (8:58)	Oki (8:37)	Terror (9:27)	Tsuruta (11:25)
Kojika	Abdullah (4:26)	Baba (14:48)	Destroyer (15:59)	Kojika (13:46)	Kojika (13:12)	Hata (7:40)	—N/a	Iaukea (5:10)	Jonathan (8:40)	DCO (21:05)	Hata (Forfeit)	Okuma (16:23)	Oki (13:10)	Terror (9:41)	Tsuruta (15:59)
Okuma	Abdullah (4:48)	Baba (7:55)	Destroyer (20:12)	DCO (13:55)	Okuma (14:44)	Iaukea (6:05)	Iaukea (5:10)	—N/a	DCO (4:21)	Iaukea (5:49)	Iaukea (7:42)	Iaukea (4:46)	Oki (3:46)	Iaukea (5:35)	Tsuruta (7:02)
Ōki	DCO (10:58)	DCO (11:43)	DCO (17:12)	Oki (11:06)	Oki (12:35)	Jonathan (14:19)	Jonathan (8:40)	DCO (4:21)	—N/a	Jonathan (12:00)	Jonathan (13:29)	Jonathan (5:15)	DCO (8:35)	Jonathan (8:33)	Jonathan (13:56)
Ramos	DCO (4:45)	Baba (3:08)	DCO (4:56)	Ramos (9:34)	Ramos (forfeit)	Kojika (8:57)	DCO (21:05)	Iaukea (5:49)	Jonathan (12:00)	—N/a	Kojika (7:58)	DCO (14:19)	Oki (12:02)	Terror (Forfeit)	Tsuruta (21:14)
Super	Abdullah (4:08)	Baba (11:36)	Destroyer (13:04)	Super (12:14)	Super (8:59)	DCO (9:42)	Hata (Forfeit)	Iaukea (7:42)	Jonathan (13:29)	Kojika (7:58)	—N/a	Okuma (8:53)	Oki (6:08)	Terror (8:29)	Tsuruta (8:24)
Takachiho	Abdullah (4:12)	Baba (12:02)	Destroyer (14:16)	Takachiho (14:10)	Takachiho (11:47)	Graham (8:58)	Okuma (16:23)	Iaukea (4:46)	Jonathan (5:15)	DCO (14:19)	Okuma (8:53)	—N/a	Oki (11:11)	Terror (10:30)	Tsuruta (16:28)
Tsuruta	Abdullah (11:15)	Draw (30:00)	Tsuruta (22:04)	Tsuruta (16:25)	Tsuruta (15:03)	Oki (8:37)	Oki (13:10)	Oki (3:46)	DCO (8:35)	Oki (12:02)	Oki (6:08)	Oki (11:11)	—N/a	Oki (4:05)	Tsuruta (7:08)
White	Abdullah (3:15)	Baba (8:07)	DCO (13:21)	Dillon (13:43)	White (16:06)	Terror (9:27)	Terror (9:41)	Iaukea (5:35)	Jonathan (8:33)	Terror (Forfeit)	Terror (8:29)	Terror (10:30)	Oki (4:05)	—N/a	Tsuruta (9:45)
Wolf	Abdullah (1:58)	Baba (4:58)	Destroyer (9:10)	Dillon (10:19)	Gonzalez (12:48)	Tsuruta (11:25)	Tsuruta (15:59)	Tsuruta (7:02)	Jonathan (13:56)	Tsuruta (21:14)	Tsuruta (8:24)	Tsuruta (16:28)	Tsuruta (7:08)	Tsuruta (9:45)	—N/a

Semifinals		Final
Giant Baba	DQ
Abdullah the Butcher	9:15
Abdullah the Butcher	9:15	Giant Baba	Pin
		Jumbo Tsuruta	10:39

== 1978 ==
The 1978 Champion Carnival took place from March 4 to April 7, featuring fifteen wrestlers in a round-robin format. The tournament was won by Giant Baba, who defeated Abdullah the Butcher via countout in the finals. It was Baba's fifth tournament win.

Final standings
Abdullah the Butcher	25
Giant Baba	24
Jumbo Tsuruta	22
Kintarō Ōki	20
Kim Duk	17
The Destroyer	16
King Curtis Iaukea	16
Don Leo Jonathan	16
The Black Terror	12
Ted DiBiase	10
Rocky Hata	4
Great Kojika	4
Motoshi Okuma	2
Luke Graham	2
Frank Morrell	0

	Abdullah	Baba	Destroyer	DiBiase	Duk	Graham	Hata	Iaukea	Jonathan	Kojika	Morrell	Okuma	Ōki	Terror	Tsuruta
Abdullah	—N/a	Draw (30:00)	Abdullah (10:21)	Abdullah (4:08)	Abdullah (7:19)	Abdullah (4:30)	Abdullah (2:03)	Abdullah (7:52)	Abdullah (4:58)	Abdullah (5:32)	Abdullah (3:55)	Abdullah (4:05)	Abdullah (7:22)	DCO (4:18)	Abdullah (13:14)
Baba	Draw (30:00)	—N/a	Baba (19:27)	Baba (7:02)	Baba (7:04)	Baba (7:06)	Baba (8:09)	Baba (5:14)	Baba (11:33)	Baba (9:08)	Baba (1:16)	Baba (5:53)	Oki (7:45)	Baba (4:36)	Draw (30:00)
Destroyer	Abdullah (10:21)	Baba (19:27)	—N/a	Destroyer (17:21)	DCO (13:55)	Destroyer (12:55)	Destroyer (11:42)	Iaukea (5:00)	DCO (17:12)	Destroyer (16:58)	Destroyer (16:35)	Destroyer (15:50)	Destroyer (12:17)	Destroyer (11:06)	Tsuruta (29:50)
DiBiase	Abdullah (4:08)	Baba (7:02)	Destroyer (17:21)	—N/a	Duk (11:10)	DiBiase (9:10)	DiBiase (13:17)	Iaukea (8:47)	Jonathan (14:20)	DiBiase (11:05)	DiBiase (8:59)	DiBiase (12:15)	Oki (12:46)	Terror (8:20)	Tsuruta (14:16)
Duk	Abdullah (7:19)	Baba (7:04)	DCO (13:55)	Duk (11:10)	—N/a	Duk (9:47)	Duk (17:17)	Duk (5:50)	Duk (13:24)	Duk (13:48)	Duk (10:12)	Duk (15:46)	Oki (Forfeit)	DCO (12:21)	Draw (30:00)
Graham	Abdullah (4:30)	Baba (7:06)	Destroyer (12:55)	DiBiase (9:10)	Duk (9:47)	—N/a	Hata (7:40)	Iaukea (6:05)	Jonathan (14:19)	Kojika (8:57)	DCO (9:42)	Graham (8:58)	Oki (8:37)	Terror (9:27)	Tsuruta (11:25)
Hata	Abdullah (2:03)	Baba (8:09)	Destroyer (11:42)	DiBiase (13:17)	Duk (17:17)	Hata (7:40)	—N/a	Iaukea (5:10)	Jonathan (8:40)	DCO (21:05)	Hata (Forfeit)	Okuma (16:23)	Oki (13:10)	Terror (9:41)	Tsuruta (15:59)
Iaukea	Abdullah (7:52)	Baba (5:14)	Iaukea (5:00)	Iaukea (8:47)	Duk (5:50)	Iaukea (6:05)	Iaukea (5:10)	—N/a	DCO (4:21)	Iaukea (5:49)	Iaukea (7:42)	Iaukea (4:46)	Oki (3:46)	Iaukea (5:35)	Tsuruta (7:02)
Jonathan	Abdullah (4:58)	Baba (11:33)	DCO (17:12)	Jonathan (14:20)	Duk (13:24)	Jonathan (14:19)	Jonathan (8:40)	DCO (4:21)	—N/a	Jonathan (12:00)	Jonathan (13:29)	Jonathan (5:15)	DCO (8:35)	Jonathan (8:33)	Jonathan (13:56)
Kojika	Abdullah (5:32)	Baba (9:08)	Destroyer (16:58)	DiBiase (11:05)	Duk (13:48)	Kojika (8:57)	DCO (21:05)	Iaukea (5:49)	Jonathan (12:00)	—N/a	Kojika (7:58)	DCO (14:19)	Oki (12:02)	Terror (Forfeit)	Tsuruta (21:14)
Morrell	Abdullah (3:55)	Baba (1:16)	Destroyer (16:35)	DiBiase (8:59)	Duk (10:12)	DCO (9:42)	Hata (Forfeit)	Iaukea (7:42)	Jonathan (13:29)	Kojika (7:58)	—N/a	Okuma (8:53)	Oki (6:08)	Terror (8:29)	Tsuruta (8:24)
Okuma	Abdullah (4:05)	Baba (5:53)	Destroyer (15:50)	DiBiase (12:15)	Duk (15:46)	Graham (8:58)	Okuma (16:23)	Iaukea (4:46)	Jonathan (5:15)	DCO (14:19)	Okuma (8:53)	—N/a	Oki (11:11)	Terror (10:30)	Tsuruta (16:28)
Ōki	Abdullah (7:22)	Oki (7:45)	Destroyer (12:17)	Oki (12:46)	Oki (Forfeit)	Oki (8:37)	Oki (13:10)	Oki (3:46)	DCO (8:35)	Oki (12:02)	Oki (6:08)	Oki (11:11)	—N/a	Oki (4:05)	Tsuruta (7:08)
Terror	DCO (4:18)	Baba (4:36)	Destroyer (11:06)	Terror (8:20)	DCO (12:21)	Terror (9:27)	Terror (9:41)	Iaukea (5:35)	Jonathan (8:33)	Terror (Forfeit)	Terror (8:29)	Terror (10:30)	Oki (4:05)	—N/a	Tsuruta (9:45)
Tsuruta	Abdullah (13:14)	Draw (30:00)	Tsuruta (29:50)	Tsuruta (14:16)	Draw (30:00)	Tsuruta (11:25)	Tsuruta (15:59)	Tsuruta (7:02)	Jonathan (13:56)	Tsuruta (21:14)	Tsuruta (8:24)	Tsuruta (16:28)	Tsuruta (7:08)	Tsuruta (9:45)	—N/a

Final
Abdullah the Butcher	CO
Giant Baba	11:59

== 1979 ==
The 1979 Champion Carnival took place from March 3 to April 6, featuring sixteen wrestlers in a round-robin format. The tournament was won by Abdullah the Butcher, who defeated Jumbo Tsuruta in the second of two playoff matches after both men tied atop the standings. The first playoff match resulted in a double-countout, and a second match was held.

Final standings
Abdullah the Butcher	24
Jumbo Tsuruta	24
Giant Baba	23
The Destroyer	22
Dick Slater	21
Dos Caras	18
Kintarō Ōki	18
Tor Kamata	18
Mario Milano	10
Takashi Ishikawa	8
Rocky Hata	6
Great Kojika	6
Motoshi Okuma	6
Billy Francis	4
Don Milano	2
Big Red	0

	Abdullah	Baba	Big Red	Caras	Destroyer	Francis	Hata	Ishikawa	Kamata	Kojika	D. Milano	M. Milano	Ōki	Okuma	Slater	Tsuruta
Abdullah	—N/a	DCO (10:47)	Abdullah (3:43)	Abdullah (2:05)	Abdullah (14:50)	Abdullah (1:13)	Abdullah (2:45)	Abdullah (1:46)	Abdullah (8:46)	Abdullah (4:18)	Abdullah (2:14)	Abdullah (2:13)	Abdullah (4:26)	Abdullah (2:13)	DCO (8:55)	DCO (5:15)
Baba	DCO (10:47)	—N/a	Baba (2:47)	Baba (7:17)	DCO (13:23)	Baba (5:25)	Baba (12:30)	Baba (9:23)	Baba (8:43)	Baba (12:36)	Baba (4:38)	Baba (8:20)	DCO (9:37)	Baba (11:41)	Baba (11:38)	Draw (30:00)
Big Red	Abdullah (3:43)	Baba (2:47)	—N/a	Caras (5:59)	Destroyer (9:28)	Francis (5:20)	Hata (7:28)	Ishikawa (9:59)	Kamata (4:59)	Kojika (7:45)	D. Milano (1:26)	M. Milano (4:12)	Oki (5:50)	Okuma (6:53)	Slater (12:40)	Tsuruta (7:18)
Caras	Abdullah (2:05)	Baba (7:17)	Caras (5:59)	—N/a	Destroyer (12:18)	Caras (8:49)	Caras (10:33)	Caras (9:31)	Caras (4:36)	Caras (10:33)	Caras (6:47)	Caras (9:23)	Oki (10:29)	Caras (5:46)	Slater (12:33)	Tsuruta (15:18)
Destroyer	Abdullah (14:50)	DCO (13:23)	Destroyer (9:28)	Destroyer (12:18)	—N/a	Destroyer (5:35)	Destroyer (7:15)	Destroyer (14:18)	Destroyer (5:33)	Destroyer (9:59)	Destroyer (9:49)	Destroyer (5:00)	DCO (11:57)	Destroyer (7:48)	Draw (30:00)	Draw (30:00)
Francis	Abdullah (1:13)	Baba (5:25)	Francis (5:20)	Caras (8:49)	Destroyer (5:35)	—N/a	Hata (8:13)	Ishikawa (11:36)	Kamata (9:08)	Kojika (13:28)	Francis (7:15)	M. Milano (10:59)	Oki (10:47)	Okuma (11:21)	Slater (9:43)	Tsuruta (11:38)
Hata	Abdullah (2:45)	Baba (12:30)	Hata (7:28)	Caras (10:33)	Destroyer (7:15)	Hata (8:13)	—N/a	DCO (16:57)	Kamata (7:56)	DCO (13:33)	Hata (5:57)	M. Milano (10:43)	Oki (11:42)	DCO (15:47)	Slater (10:32)	Tsuruta (15:55)
Ishikawa	Abdullah (1:46)	Baba (9:23)	Ishikawa (9:59)	Caras (9:31)	Destroyer (14:18)	Ishikawa (11:36)	DCO (16:57)	—N/a	Kamata (3:04)	DCO (7:47)	Ishikawa (9:59)	Ishikawa (14:02)	Oki (9:45)	DCO (10:30)	Slater (8:59)	Tsuruta (20:47)
Kamata	Abdullah (8:46)	Baba (8:43)	Kamata (4:59)	Caras (4:36)	Destroyer (5:33)	Kamata (9:08)	Kamata (7:56)	Kamata (3:04)	—N/a	Kamata (7:38)	Kamata (2:28)	Kamata (7:12)	DCO (6:43)	Kamata (9:35)	Slater (5:56)	Tsuruta (5:55)
Kojik	Abdullah (4:18)	Baba (12:36)	Kojika (7:45)	Caras (10:33)	Destroyer (9:59)	Kojika (13:28)	DCO (13:33)	DCO (7:47)	Kamata (7:38)	—N/a	Kojika (13:21)	M. Milano (12:11)	Oki (12:48)	DCO (5:54)	Slater (11:43)	Tsuruta (24:04)
D. Milano	Abdullah (2:14)	Baba (4:38)	D. Milano (1:26)	Caras (6:47)	Destroyer (9:49)	Francis (7:15)	Hata (5:57)	Ishikawa (9:59)	Kamata (2:28)	Kojika (13:21)	—N/a	M. Milano (5:52)	Oki (6:24)	Okuma (8:25)	Slater (6:42)	Tsuruta (12:03)
M. Milano	Abdullah (2:13)	Baba (8:20)	M. Milano (4:12)	Caras (9:23)	Destroyer (5:00)	M. Milano (10:59)	M. Milano (10:43)	Ishikawa (14:02)	Kamata (7:12)	M. Milano (12:11)	M. Milano (5:52)	—N/a	Oki (7:05)	DCO (7:14)	Slater (11:48)	Tsuruta (14:11)
Ōki	Abdullah (4:26)	DCO (9:37)	Oki (5:50)	Oki (10:29)	DCO (11:57)	Oki (10:47)	Oki (11:42)	Oki (9:45)	DCO (6:43)	Oki (12:48)	Oki (6:24)	Oki (7:05)	—N/a	Oki (14:29)	DCO (4:38)	DCO (6:55)
Okuma	Abdullah (2:13)	Baba (11:41)	Okuma (6:53)	Caras (5:46)	Destroyer (7:48)	Okuma (11:21)	DCO (15:47)	DCO (10:30)	Kamata (9:35)	DCO (5:54)	Okuma (8:25)	DCO (7:14)	Oki (14:29)	—N/a	Slater (7:52)	Tsuruta (19:50)
Slater	DCO (8:55)	Baba (11:38)	Slater (12:40)	Slater (12:33)	Draw (30:00)	Slater (9:43)	Slater (10:32)	Slater (8:59)	Slater (5:56)	Slater (11:43)	Slater (6:42)	Slater (11:48)	DCO (4:38)	Slater (7:52)	—N/a	Tsuruta (18:55)
Tsuruta	DCO (5:15)	Draw (30:00)	Tsuruta (7:18)	Tsuruta (15:18)	Draw (30:00)	Tsuruta (11:38)	Tsuruta (15:55)	Tsuruta (20:47)	Tsuruta (5:55)	Tsuruta (24:04)	Tsuruta (12:03)	Tsuruta (14:11)	DCO (6:55)	Tsuruta (19:50)	Tsuruta (18:55)	—N/a

- Playoff matches:

- Abdullah the Butcher vs. Jumbo Tsuruta ended in a double-countout (13:14)
- Abdullah the Butcher defeated Jumbo Tsuruta (2:11)

== 1980 ==
The 1980 Champion Carnival took place from March 28 to May 1, featuring thirteen wrestlers in a round-robin format. The tournament was won by Jumbo Tsuruta, who defeated Dick Slater in the final.

Final standings
Dick Slater	19
Jumbo Tsuruta	19
Abdullah the Butcher	18
Terry Funk	18
Giant Baba	17
Tiger Toguchi	15
Ted DiBiase	12
Ray Candy	8
The Mysterious Assassin	6
Rocky Hata	4
Great Kojika	4
Motoshi Okuma	2
Carl Fergie	0

	Abdullah	Assassin	Baba	Candy	DiBiase	Fergie	Funk	Hata	Kojika	Okuma	Slater	Toguchi	Tsuruta
Abdullah	—N/a	Abdullah (0:35)	DCO (7:57)	Abdullah (5:45)	Abdullah (4:10)	Abdullah (1:15)	DCO (13:21)	Abdullah (2:45)	Abdullah (5:20)	Abdullah (4:30)	Abdullah (13:15)	Abdullah (5:35)	Tsuruta (10:45)
Assassin	Abdullah (0:35)	—N/a	Assassin (6:50)	Candy (10:44)	DiBiase (7:55)	Assassin (7:58)	Funk (11:30)	Hata (11:20)	DCO (13:29)	Assassin (10:50)	Slater (6:43)	Toguchi (12:17)	Tsuruta (11:50)
Baba	DCO (7:57)	Assassin (6:50)	—N/a	Baba (6:50)	Baba (10:59)	Baba (10:20)	Baba (13:02)	Baba (8:27)	Baba (12:30)	Baba (8:55)	Slater (11:22)	Baba (13:08)	Draw (30:00)
Candy	Abdullah (5:45)	Candy (10:44)	Baba (6:50)	—N/a	DCO (16:40)	Candy (5:10)	Funk (8:44)	Candy (10:21)	Kojika (13:13)	Candy (8:03)	Slater (13:08)	Toguchi (11:58)	Tsuruta (11:58)
DiBiase	Abdullah (4:10)	DiBiase (7:55)	Baba (10:59)	DCO (16:40)	—N/a	DiBiase (16:33)	Funk (22:45)	DiBiase (12:04)	DiBiase (11:20)	DiBiase (10:50)	Draw (30:00)	Draw (30:00)	Tsuruta (18:01)
Fergie	Abdullah (1:15)	Assassin (7:58)	Baba (10:20)	Candy (5:10)	DiBiase (16:33)	—N/a	Funk (9:39)	Hata (20:17)	Kojika (12:14)	Okuma (14:30)	Slater (9:34)	Toguchi (12:06)	Tsuruta (8:35)
Funk	DCO (13:21)	Funk (11:30)	Baba (13:02)	Funk (8:44)	Funk (22:45)	Funk (9:39)	—N/a	Funk (10:59)	Funk (11:40)	Funk (14:44)	Draw (30:00)	Funk (19:51)	Draw (30:00)
Hata	Abdullah (2:45)	Hata (11:20)	Baba (8:27)	Candy (10:21)	DiBiase (12:04)	Hata (20:17)	Funk (10:59)	—N/a	DCO (19:26)	DCO (20:14)	Slater (13:50)	Toguchi (20:18)	Tsuruta (18:19)
Kojika	Abdullah (5:20)	DCO (13:29)	Baba (12:30)	Kojika (13:13)	DiBiase (11:20)	Kojika (12:14)	Funk (11:40)	DCO (19:26)	—N/a	DCO (20:30)	Slater (8:53)	Toguchi (13:10)	Tsuruta (14:08)
Okuma	Abdullah (4:30)	Assassin (10:50)	Baba (8:55)	Candy (8:03)	DiBiase (10:50)	Okuma (14:30)	Funk (14:44)	DCO (20:14)	DCO (20:30)	—N/a	Slater (8:31)	Toguchi (18:03)	Tsuruta (18:05)
Slater	Abdullah (13:15)	Slater (6:43)	Slater (11:22)	Slater (13:08)	Draw (30:00)	Slater (9:34)	Draw (30:00)	Slater (13:50)	Slater (8:53)	Slater (8:31)	—N/a	Draw (30:00)	Slater (22:40)
Toguchi	Abdullah (5:35)	Toguchi (12:17)	Baba (13:08)	Toguchi (11:58)	Draw (30:00)	Toguchi (12:06)	Funk (19:51)	Toguchi (20:18)	Toguchi (13:10)	Toguchi (18:03)	Draw (30:00)	—N/a	Draw (30:00)
Tsuruta	Tsuruta (10:45)	Tsuruta (11:50)	Draw (30:00)	Tsuruta (11:58)	Tsuruta (18:01)	Tsuruta (8:35)	Draw (30:00)	Tsuruta (18:19)	Tsuruta (14:08)	Tsuruta (18:05)	Slater (22:40)	Draw (30:00)	—N/a

Final
Dick Slater	Pin
Jumbo Tsuruta	23:45

== 1981 ==
The 1981 Champion Carnival took place from March 27 to April 23, featuring fourteen wrestlers in a round-robin format. Giant Baba won the tournament for the sixth time.

Final standings
Giant Baba	21
Jumbo Tsuruta	19
Abdullah the Butcher	18
Jack Brisco	18
Bruiser Brody	18
Tiger Toguchi	17
Killer Brooks	12
The Avenger	10
Takashi Ishikawa	8
Rocky Hata	6
Great Kojika	6
Prince Tonga	6
Motoshi Okuma	4
Wayne Farris	3

	Abdullah	Avenger	Baba	Brisco	Brody	Brooks	Farris	Hata	Ishikawa	Kojika	Okuma	Toguchi	Tonga	Tsuruta
Abdullah	—N/a	Abdullah (4:44)	DCO (9:10)	DCO (2:44)	DCO (4:29)	Abdullah (2:58)	Abdullah (0:49)	Abdullah (3:07)	Abdullah (4:15)	Abdullah (5:08)	Abdullah (2:18)	Abdullah (5:40)	Abdullah (8:37)	DCO (10:02)
Avenger	Abdullah (4:44)	—N/a	Avenger (4:38)	Brisco (11:38)	Brody (3:36)	Brooks (10:58)	Avenger (17:12)	Avenger (12:11)	Ishikawa (7:51)	Kojika (16:29)	Avenger (13:32)	Toguchi (15:57)	Avenger (16:41)	Tsuruta (13:03)
Baba	DCO (9:10)	Avenger (4:38)	—N/a	Baba (11:25)	Baba (8:11)	Baba (4:41)	Baba (5:43)	Baba (8:20)	Baba (7:38)	Baba (17:35)	Baba (13:43)	Baba (7:28)	Baba (9:18)	Draw (30:00)
Brisco	DCO (2:44)	Brisco (11:38)	Baba (11:25)	—N/a	DCO (2:25)	Brisco (4:05)	Draw (30:00)	Brisco (15:12)	Brisco (7:18)	Brisco (11:22)	Brisco (12:05)	Brisco (13:53)	Brisco (10:27)	Draw (30:00)
Brody	DCO (4:29)	Brody (3:36)	Baba (8:11)	DCO (2:25)	—N/a	Brody (2:35)	Brody (0:16)	Brody (3:31)	Brody (2:19)	Brody (3:02)	Brody (3:11)	Brody (5:49)	Brody (4:24)	DCO (12:31)
Brooks	Abdullah (2:58)	Brooks (10:58)	Baba (4:41)	Brisco (4:05)	Brody (2:35)	—N/a	Brooks (9:15)	Brooks (15:17)	Ishikawa (Forfeit)	Brooks (14:09)	Brooks (12:30)	Toguchi (13:00)	Brooks (9:10)	Tsuruta (Forfeit)
Farris	Abdullah (0:49)	Avenger (17:12)	Baba (5:43)	Draw (30:00)	Brody (0:16)	Brooks (9:15)	—N/a	Hata (13:09)	Ishikawa (10:38)	Kojika (13:58)	Ferris (12:16)	Toguchi (14:59)	Tonga (15:32)	Tsuruta (2:55)
Hata	Abdullah (3:07)	Avenger (12:11)	Baba (8:20)	Brisco (15:12)	Brody (3:31)	Brooks (15:17)	Hata (13:09)	—N/a	Hata (23:49)	DCO (16:55)	Hata (26:30)	Toguchi (20:28)	Tonga (18:19)	Tsuruta (23:31)
Ishikawa	Abdullah (4:15)	Ishikawa (7:51)	Baba (7:38)	Brisco (7:18)	Brody (2:19)	Ishikawa (Forfeit)	Ishikawa (10:38)	Hata (23:49)	—N/a	Kojika (19:15)	Ishikawa (17:02)	Toguchi (16:18)	DCO (12:57)	Tsuruta (20:35)
Kojika	Abdullah (5:08)	Kojika (16:29)	Baba (17:35)	Brisco (11:22)	Brody (3:02)	Brooks (14:09)	Kojika (13:58)	DCO (16:55)	Kojika (19:15)	—N/a	Okuma (19:17)	Toguchi (21:37)	Tonga (18:43)	Tsuruta (21:57)
Okuma	Abdullah (2:18)	Avenger (13:32)	Baba (13:43)	Brisco (12:05)	Brody (3:11)	Brooks (12:30)	Ferris (12:16)	Hata (26:30)	Ishikawa (17:02)	Okuma (19:17)	—N/a	Toguchi (16:38)	Okuma (26:55)	Tsuruta (22:15)
Toguchi	Abdullah (5:40)	Toguchi (15:57)	Baba (7:28)	Brisco (13:53)	Brody (5:49)	Toguchi (13:00)	Toguchi (14:59)	Toguchi (20:28)	Toguchi (16:18)	Toguchi (21:37)	Toguchi (16:38)	—N/a	Toguchi (21:13)	Draw (30:00)
Tonga	Abdullah (8:37)	Avenger (16:41)	Baba (9:18)	Brisco (10:27)	Brody (4:24)	Brooks (9:10)	Tonga (15:32)	Tonga (18:19)	DCO (12:57)	Tonga (18:43)	Okuma (26:55)	Toguchi (21:13)	—N/a	Tsuruta (17:12)
Tsuruta	DCO (10:02)	Tsuruta (13:03)	Draw (30:00)	Draw (30:00)	DCO (12:31)	Tsuruta (Forfeit)	Tsuruta (2:55)	Tsuruta (23:31)	Tsuruta (20:35)	Tsuruta (21:57)	Tsuruta (22:15)	Draw (30:00)	Tsuruta (17:12)	—N/a

== 1982 ==
The 1982 Champion Carnival took place from March 23 to April 18, featuring eighteen wrestlers in a round-robin format. Giant Baba won the tournament for the seventh time.

Final standings
Giant Baba	29
Bruiser Brody	28
Ted DiBiase	28
Jumbo Tsuruta	28
Genichiro Tenryu	26
Billy Robinson	25
Mongolian Stomper	20
Alexis Smirnoff	18
Buck Robley	16
Mighty Inoue	11
Rocky Hata	10
Motoshi Okuma	10
Akio Sato	10
Prince Tonga	10
Takashi Ishikawa	9
Great Kojika	8
Bill Howard	2
Carl Fergie	0

	Baba	Brody	DiBiase	Fergie	Hata	Howard	Inoue	Ishikawa	Kojika	Okuma	Robinson	Robley	Sato	Smirnoff	Stomper	Tenryu	Tonga	Tsuruta
Baba	—N/a	Baba (10:02)	Baba (7:25)	Baba (Forfeit)	Baba (8:10)	Baba (6:01)	Baba (8:50)	Baba (9:18)	Baba (10:03)	Baba (10:42)	DCO (10:57)	Baba (2:29)	Baba (11:26)	Baba (6:14)	DDQ (5:19)	Baba (16:09)	Baba (11:41)	Draw (30:00)
Brody	Baba (10:02)	—N/a	Brody (9:59)	Brody (Forfeit)	Brody (1:05)	Brody (0:53)	Brody (1:24)	Brody (1:48)	Brody (2:54)	Brody (1:46)	Draw (30:00)	Brody (Forfeit)	Brody (1:26)	Brody (1:23)	Brody (2:09)	Brody (3:29)	Brody (4:17)	DCO (6:22)
DiBiase	Baba (7:25)	Brody (9:59)	—N/a	DiBiase (Forfeit)	DiBiase (11:47)	DiBiase (9:16)	DiBiase (6:55)	DiBiase (14:22)	DiBiase (11:01)	DiBiase (8:05)	DiBiase (Forfeit)	DiBiase (7:15)	DiBiase (8:29)	DiBiase (3:02)	DiBiase (7:39)	Draw (30:00)	DiBiase (15:02)	Draw (30:00)
Fergie	Baba (Forfeit)	Brody (Forfeit)	DiBiase (Forfeit)	—N/a	Hata (Forfeit)	Howard (Forfeit)	Inoue (Forfeit)	Ishikawa (Forfeit)	Kojika (Forfeit)	Okuma (Forfeit)	Robinson (Forfeit)	Robley (Forfeit)	Sato (Forfeit)	Smirnoff (Forfeit)	Stomper (Forfeit)	Tenryu (Forfeit)	Tonga (Forfeit)	Tsuruta (Forfeit)
Hata	Baba (8:10)	Brody (1:05)	DiBiase (11:47)	Hata (Forfeit)	—N/a	Hata (14:57)	Draw (30:00)	Draw (30:00)	Hata (21:58)	Okuma (18:36)	Robinson (6:00)	Robley (10:13)	DCO (10:11)	Smirnoff (Forfeit)	Stomper (7:29)	Tenryu (12:43)	Hata (10:51)	Tsuruta (18:50)
Howard	Baba (6:01)	Brody (0:53)	DiBiase (9:16)	Howard (Forfeit)	Hata (14:57)	—N/a	Inoue (9:35)	Ishikawa (6:51)	Kojika (11:30)	Okuma (10:36)	Robinson (9:44)	Robley (8:58)	Sato (6:39)	Smirnoff (Forfeit)	Stomper (4:31)	Tenryu (7:32)	Tonga (1:47)	Tsuruta (10:57)
Inoue	Baba (8:50)	Brody (1:24)	DiBiase (6:55)	Inoue (Forfeit)	Draw (30:00)	Inoue (9:35)	—N/a	Inoue (12:02)	Kojika (21:06)	Inoue (10:33)	Robinson (10:40)	Inoue (Forfeit)	Sato (11:31)	Smirnoff (9:49)	Stomper (7:35)	Tenryu (10:08)	DCO (10:52)	Tsuruta (11:00)
Ishikawa	Baba (9:18)	Brody (1:48)	DiBiase (14:22)	Ishikawa (Forfeit)	Draw (30:00)	Ishikawa (6:51)	Inoue (12:02)	—N/a	Kojika (13:14)	Ishikawa (16:59)	Robinson (9:41)	Robley (6:15)	Sato (??:??)	Smirnoff (8:30)	Stomper (6:54)	Tenryu (12:03)	Ishikawa (9:03)	Tsuruta (9:24)
Kojika	Baba (10:03)	Brody (2:54)	DiBiase (11:01)	Kojika (Forfeit)	Hata (21:58)	Kojika (11:30)	Kojika (21:06)	Kojika (13:14)	—N/a	Double Forfeit	Robinson (11:25)	Robley (12:11)	Sato (17:32)	Smirnoff (9:28)	Stomper (9:05)	Tenryu (8:31)	Tonga (15:27)	Tsuruta (12:28)
Okuma	Baba (10:42)	Brody (1:46)	DiBiase (8:05)	Okuma (Forfeit)	Okuma (18:36)	Okuma (10:36)	Inoue (10:33)	Ishikawa (16:59)	Double Forfeit	—N/a	Robinson (8:33)	Robley (9:10)	Okuma (11:31)	Smirnoff (8:50)	Stomper (3:21)	Tenryu (11:48)	Tonga (16:19)	Tsuruta (19:00)
Robinson	DCO (10:57)	Draw (30:00)	DiBiase (Forfeit)	Robinson (Forfeit)	Robinson (6:00)	Robinson (9:44)	Robinson (10:40)	Robinson (9:41)	Robinson (11:25)	Robinson (8:33)	—N/a	DCO (8:03)	Robinson (10:51)	Robinson (13:19)	Robinson (11:10)	Robinson (19:39)	Robinson (10:55)	Draw (30:00)
Robley	Baba (2:29)	Brody (Forfeit)	DiBiase (7:15)	Robley (Forfeit)	Robley (10:13)	Robley (8:58)	Inoue (Forfeit)	Robley (6:15)	Robley (12:11)	Robley (9:10)	DCO (8:03)	—N/a	Robley (7:55)	DCO (7:48)	DCO (8:06)	Tenryu (11:49)	Robley (8:21)	Tsuruta (7:54)
Sato	Baba (11:26)	Brody (1:26)	DiBiase (8:29)	Sato (Forfeit)	DCO (10:11)	Sato (6:39)	Sato (11:31)	Sato (??:??)	Sato (17:32)	Okuma (11:31)	Robinson (10:51)	Robley (7:55)	—N/a	Smirnoff (5:12)	Stomper (8:17)	Tenryu (13:16)	Tonga (7:45)	Tsuruta (10:30)
Smirnoff	Baba (6:14)	Brody (1:23)	DiBiase (3:02)	Smirnoff (Forfeit)	Smirnoff (Forfeit)	Smirnoff (Forfeit)	Smirnoff (9:49)	Smirnoff (8:30)	Smirnoff (9:28)	Smirnoff (8:50)	Robinson (13:19)	DCO (7:48)	Smirnoff (5:12)	—N/a	Stomper (Forfeit)	Tenryu (7:39)	Stomper (11:19)	Tsuruta (10:44)
Stomper	DDQ (5:19)	Brody (2:09)	DiBiase (7:39)	Stomper (Forfeit)	Stomper (7:29)	Stomper (4:31)	Stomper (7:35)	Stomper (6:54)	Stomper (9:05)	Stomper (3:21)	Robinson (11:10)	DCO (8:06)	Stomper (8:17)	Stomper (Forfeit)	—N/a	Tenryu (7:44)	Stomper (6:10)	Tsuruta (7:54)
Tenryu	Baba (16:09)	Brody (3:29)	Draw (30:00)	Tenryu (Forfeit)	Tenryu (12:43)	Tenryu (7:32)	Tenryu (10:08)	Tenryu (12:03)	Tenryu (8:31)	Tenryu (11:48)	Robinson (19:39)	Tenryu (11:49)	Tenryu (13:16)	Tenryu (7:39)	Tenryu (7:44)	—N/a	Tenryu (12:19)	Draw (30:00)
Tonga	Baba (11:41)	Brody (4:17)	DiBiase (15:02)	Tonga (Forfeit)	Hata (10:51)	Tonga (1:47)	DCO (10:52)	Ishikawa (9:03)	Tonga (15:27)	Tonga (16:19)	Robinson (10:55)	Robley (8:21)	Tonga (7:45)	Stomper (11:19)	Stomper (6:10)	Tenryu (12:19)	—N/a	Tsuruta (15:50)
Tsuruta	Draw (30:00)	DCO (6:22)	Draw (30:00)	Tsuruta (Forfeit)	Tsuruta (18:50)	Tsuruta (10:57)	Tsuruta (11:00)	Tsuruta (9:24)	Tsuruta (12:28)	Tsuruta (19:00)	Draw (30:00)	Tsuruta (7:54)	Tsuruta (10:30)	Tsuruta (10:44)	Tsuruta (7:54)	Draw (30:00)	Tsuruta (15:50)	—N/a

== 1991 ==
The 1991 Champion Carnival took place from March 23 to April 18, featuring fourteen wrestlers participating in a two-block round-robin format. The two wrestlers who finished atop each block met in the final.

Jumbo Tsuruta, the reigning Triple Crown Heavyweight Champion, defeated Stan Hansen in the final.

Final standings
Block A		Block B	
Stan Hansen	12	Jumbo Tsuruta	12
Mitsuharu Misawa	10	Danny Spivey	10
Dynamite Kid	8	Toshiaki Kawada	8
Kenta Kobashi	6	Akira Taue	6
Doug Furnas	4	Dan Kroffat	4
Texas Terminator Hoss	2	Johnny Smith	2
Johnny Ace	0	Cactus Jack	0

Block A	Ace	Dynamite	Furnas	Hansen	Kobashi	Misawa	Terminator
Ace	—N/a	Dynamite (Forfeit)	Furnas (Forfeit)	Hansen (10:20)	Kobashi (18:22)	Misawa (12:30)	Terminator (Forfeit)
Dynamite	Dynamite (Forfeit)	—N/a	Dynamite (8:40)	Hansen (6:59)	Dynamite (10:33)	Misawa (8:18)	Dynamite (7:32)
Furnas	Furnas (Forfeit)	Dynamite (8:40)	—N/a	Hansen (7:23)	Kobashi (15:04)	Misawa (10:27)	Furnas (7:46)
Hansen	Hansen (10:20)	Hansen (6:59)	Hansen (7:23)	—N/a	Hansen (13:41)	Hansen (17:15)	Hansen (8:03)
Kobashi	Kobashi (18:22)	Dynamite (10:33)	Kobashi (15:04)	Hansen (13:41)	—N/a	Misawa (13:26)	Kobashi (5:02)
Misawa	Misawa (12:30)	Misawa (8:18)	Misawa (10:27)	Hansen (17:15)	Misawa (13:26)	—N/a	Misawa (7:53)
Terminator	Terminator (Forfeit)	Dynamite (7:32)	Furnas (7:46)	Hansen (8:03)	Kobashi (5:02)	Misawa (7:53)	—N/a
Block B	Cactus	Kawada	Kroffat	Smith	Spivey	Taue	Tsuruta
Cactus	—N/a	Kawada (7:01)	Kroffat (12:52)	Smith (9:58)	Spivey (7:50)	Taue (8:10)	Tsuruta (4:58)
Kawada	Kawada (7:01)	—N/a	Kawada (12:53)	Kawada (15:26)	Spivey (13:22)	Kawada (15:43)	Tsuruta (17:13)
Kroffat	Kroffat (12:52)	Kawada (12:53)	—N/a	Kroffat (11:55)	Spivey (9:47)	Taue (8:55)	Tsuruta (8:02)
Smith	Smith (9:58)	Kawada (15:26)	Kroffat (11:55)	—N/a	Spivey (11:05)	Taue (10:41)	Tsuruta (8:20)
Spivey	Spivey (7:50)	Spivey (13:22)	Spivey (9:47)	Spivey (11:05)	—N/a	Spivey (10:09)	Tsuruta (12:35)
Taue	Taue (8:10)	Kawada (15:43)	Taue (8:55)	Taue (10:41)	Spivey (10:09)	—N/a	Tsuruta (12:38)
Tsuruta	Tsuruta (4:58)	Tsuruta (17:13)	Tsuruta (8:02)	Tsuruta (8:20)	Tsuruta (12:35)	Tsuruta (12:38)	—N/a

Final
A1	Stan Hansen	Pin
B1	Jumbo Tsuruta	12:53

== 1992 ==
The 1992 Champion Carnival took place from March 20 to April 17, featuring twenty wrestlers participating in a two-block round-robin format. The two wrestlers who finished atop each block met in the final.

Stan Hansen, the reigning Triple Crown Heavyweight Champion, defeated Mitsuharu Misawa in the final.

Final standings
Block A		Block B	
Mitsuharu Misawa	17	Stan Hansen	18
Jumbo Tsuruta	16	Steve Williams	15
Terry Gordy	15	Toshiaki Kawada	12
Johnny Ace	12	Danny Spivey	12
Masanobu Fuchi	10	Kenta Kobashi	11
Doug Furnas	8	Dan Kroffat	8
Kimala II	6	Akira Taue	8
Tsuyoshi Kikuchi	4	Yoshinari Ogawa	4
Master Blaster	2	David Isley	2
Joel Deaton	0	Billy Black	0

Block A	Ace	Blaster	Deaton	Fuchi	Furnas	Gordy	Kikuchi	Kimala	Misawa	Tsuruta
Ace	—N/a	Ace (9:51)	Ace (Forfeit)	Ace (13:54)	Ace (11:49)	Gordy (9:30)	Ace (9:24)	Ace (9:45)	Misawa (17:04)	Tsuruta (9:21)
Blaster	Ace (9:51)	—N/a	Blaster (Forfeit)	Fuchi (9:42)	Furnas (9:43)	Gordy (7:27)	Kikuchi (8:19)	Kimala (6:31)	Misawa (1:26)	Tsuruta (6:06)
Deaton	Ace (Forfeit)	Blaster (Forfeit)	—N/a	Fuchi (Forfeit)	Furnas (Forfeit)	Gordy (8:03)	Kikuchi (Forfeit)	Kimala (Forfeit)	Misawa (Forfeit)	Tsuruta (Forfeit)
Fuchi	Ace (13:54)	Fuchi (9:42)	Fuchi (Forfeit)	—N/a	Fuchi (12:23)	Gordy (7:21)	Fuchi (20:26)	Fuchi (11:46)	Misawa (18:11)	Tsuruta (14:35)
Furnas	Ace (11:49)	Furnas (9:43)	Furnas (Forfeit)	Fuchi (12:23)	—N/a	Gordy (12:51)	Furnas (11:09)	Furnas (8:36)	Misawa (11:20)	Tsuruta (8:15)
Gordy	Gordy (9:30)	Gordy (7:27)	Gordy (8:03)	Gordy (7:21)	Gordy (12:51)	—N/a	Gordy (6:25)	Gordy (7:27)	Misawa (17:27)	Draw (30:00)
Kikuchi	Ace (9:24)	Kikuchi (8:19)	Kikuchi (Forfeit)	Fuchi (20:26)	Furnas (11:09)	Gordy (6:25)	—N/a	Kimala (8:41)	Misawa (10:28)	Tsuruta (15:03)
Kimala	Ace (9:45)	Kimala (6:31)	Kimala (Forfeit)	Fuchi (11:46)	Furnas (8:36)	Gordy (7:27)	Kimala (8:41)	—N/a	Misawa (6:29)	Tsuruta (7:13)
Misawa	Misawa (17:04)	Misawa (1:26)	Misawa (Forfeit)	Misawa (18:11)	Misawa (11:20)	Misawa (17:27)	Misawa (10:28)	Misawa (6:29)	—N/a	Draw (30:00)
Tsuruta	Tsuruta (9:21)	Tsuruta (6:06)	Tsuruta (Forfeit)	Tsuruta (14:35)	Tsuruta (8:15)	Draw (30:00)	Tsuruta (15:03)	Tsuruta (7:13)	Draw (30:00)	—N/a
Block B	Black	Hansen	Isley	Kawada	Kobashi	Kroffat	Ogawa	Spivey	Taue	Williams
Black	—N/a	Hansen (Forfeit)	Isley (Forfeit)	Kawada (Forfeit)	Kobashi (Forfeit)	Kroffat (Forfeit)	Ogawa (Forfeit)	Spivey (Forfeit)	Taue (Forfeit)	Williams (Forfeit)
Hansen	Hansen (Forfeit)	—N/a	Hansen (9:26)	Hansen (17:59)	Hansen (14:43)	Hansen (8:55)	Hansen (2:22)	Hansen (9:29)	Hansen (11:43)	Hansen (19:16)
Isley	Isley (Forfeit)	Hansen (9:26)	—N/a	Kawada (0:41)	Kobashi (7:49)	Kroffat (7:21)	Ogawa (6:39)	Spivey (1:20)	Taue (5:53)	Williams (3:03)
Kawada	Kawada (Forfeit)	Hansen (17:59)	Kawada (0:41)	—N/a	Kawada (20:40)	Kawada (9:55)	Kawada (10:08)	Kawada (12:50)	Taue (17:03)	Williams (22:45)
Kobashi	Kobashi (Forfeit)	Hansen (14:43)	Kobashi (7:49)	Kawada (20:40)	—N/a	Kobashi (12:43)	Kobashi (11:48)	Spivey (16:16)	Kobashi (Forfeit)	Draw (30:00)
Kroffat	Kroffat (Forfeit)	Hansen (8:55)	Kroffat (7:21)	Kawada (9:55)	Kobashi (12:43)	—N/a	Kroffat (10:10)	Spivey (11:06)	Kroffat (Forfeit)	Williams (13:04)
Ogawa	Ogawa (Forfeit)	Hansen (2:22)	Ogawa (6:39)	Kawada (10:08)	Kobashi (11:48)	Kroffat (10:10)	—N/a	Spivey (1:40)	Taue (7:09)	Williams (2:19)
Spivey	Spivey (Forfeit)	Hansen (9:29)	Spivey (1:20)	Kawada (12:50)	Spivey (16:16)	Spivey (11:06)	Spivey (1:40)	—N/a	Spivey (10:44)	Williams (14:30)
Taue	Taue (Forfeit)	Hansen (11:43)	Taue (5:53)	Taue (17:03)	Kobashi (Forfeit)	Kroffat (Forfeit)	Taue (7:09)	Spivey (10:44)	—N/a	Williams (11:35)
Williams	Williams (Forfeit)	Hansen (19:16)	Williams (3:03)	Williams (22:45)	Draw (30:00)	Williams (13:04)	Williams (2:19)	Williams (14:30)	Williams (11:35)	—N/a

Final
A1	Mitsuharu Misawa	Pin
B1	Stan Hansen	20:06

== 1993 ==
The 1993 Champion Carnival took place from March 25 to April 21, featuring thirteen wrestlers participating in a single-block round-robin format. Stan Hansen repeated as tournament champion, a feat that had only been achieved by Giant Baba.

Jun Akiyama suffered an arm injury in a tag team match on the first event of the tournament, partnered with Takao Omori against Satoru Asako and Masao Inoue (their first match as a team). Akiyama was unable to participate in the tournament as a result.

Final standings
Stan Hansen	20
Mitsuharu Misawa	20
Terry Gordy	19
Steve Williams	19
Toshiaki Kawada	18
Akira Taue	17
Kenta Kobashi	12
Davey Boy Smith	8
Johnny Ace	8
The Patriot	7
Philip LaFon	4
Doug Furnas	4
Jun Akiyama	0

	Ace	Akiyama	Furnas	Gordy	Hansen	Kawada	Kobashi	LaFon	Misawa	Patriot	Smith	Taue	Williams
Ace	—N/a	Ace (Forfeit)	Ace (12:50)	Gordy (18:03)	Hansen (21:20)	Kawada (11:25)	Kobashi (20:19)	Ace (10:51)	Misawa (22:39)	Ace (13:03)	Smith (18:23)	Taue (15:42)	Williams (12:01)
Akiyama	Ace (Forfeit)	—N/a	Furnas (Forfeit)	Gordy (Forfeit)	Hansen (Forfeit)	Kawada (Forfeit)	Kobashi (Forfeit)	LaFon (Forfeit)	Misawa (Forfeit)	Patriot (Forfeit)	Smith (Forfeit)	Taue (Forfeit)	Williams (Forfeit)
Furnas	Ace (12:50)	Furnas (Forfeit)	—N/a	Gordy (14:38)	Hansen (12:31)	Kawada (16:02)	Kobashi (13:50)	LaFon (13:43)	Misawa (11:19)	Furnas (13:59)	Smith (12:54)	Taue (9:05)	Williams (13:51)
Gordy	Gordy (18:03)	Gordy (Forfeit)	Gordy (14:38)	—N/a	Hansen (15:56)	Gordy (20:17)	Draw (30:00)	Gordy (7:52)	Gordy (20:29)	Gordy (18:13)	Gordy (16:42)	Taue (17:52)	Gordy (24:14)
Hansen	Hansen (21:20)	Hansen (Forfeit)	Hansen (12:31)	Hansen (15:56)	—N/a	Kawada (20:50)	Hansen (24:45)	Hansen (6:38)	Hansen (20:23)	Hansen (11:16)	Hansen (6:02)	Hansen (18:38)	Williams (21:22)
Kawada	Kawada (11:25)	Kawada (Forfeit)	Kawada (16:02)	Gordy (20:17)	Kawada (20:50)	—N/a	Kawada (23:44)	Kawada (10:33)	Misawa (22:00)	Kawada (12:25)	Kawada (12:07)	Draw (30:00)	Draw (30:00)
Kobashi	Kobashi (20:19)	Kobashi (Forfeit)	Kobashi (13:50)	Draw (30:00)	Hansen (24:45)	Kawada (23:44)	—N/a	Kobashi (14:17)	Misawa (21:16)	Draw (30:00)	Kobashi (13:53)	Taue (22:43)	Williams (20:04)
LaFon	Ace (10:51)	LaFon (Forfeit)	LaFon (13:43)	Gordy (7:52)	Hansen (6:38)	Kawada (10:33)	Kobashi (14:17)	—N/a	Misawa (9:54)	Patriot (13:36)	Smith (11:59)	Taue (9:41)	Williams (10:33)
Misawa	Misawa (22:39)	Misawa (Forfeit)	Misawa (11:19)	Gordy (20:29)	Hansen (20:23)	Misawa (22:00)	Misawa (21:16)	Misawa (9:54)	—N/a	Misawa (12:20)	Misawa (9:39)	Misawa (19:11)	Misawa (13:54)
Patriot	Ace (13:03)	Patriot (Forfeit)	Furnas (13:59)	Gordy (18:13)	Hansen (11:16)	Kawada (12:25)	Draw (30:00)	Patriot (13:36)	Misawa (12:20)	—N/a	Patriot (10:20)	Taue (12:41)	Williams (13:36)
Smith	Smith (18:23)	Smith (Forfeit)	Smith (12:54)	Gordy (16:42)	Hansen (6:02)	Kawada (12:07)	Kobashi (13:53)	Smith (11:59)	Misawa (9:39)	Patriot (10:20)	—N/a	Taue (12:01)	Williams (13:16)
Taue	Taue (15:42)	Taue (Forfeit)	Taue (9:05)	Taue (17:52)	Hansen (18:38)	Draw (30:00)	Taue (22:43)	Taue (9:41)	Misawa (19:11)	Taue (12:41)	Taue (12:01)	—N/a	Williams (16:47)
Williams	Williams (12:01)	Williams (Forfeit)	Williams (13:51)	Gordy (24:14)	Williams (21:22)	Draw (30:00)	Williams (20:04)	Williams (10:33)	Misawa (13:54)	Williams (13:36)	Williams (13:16)	Williams (16:47)	—N/a

Final
Stan Hansen	Pin
Mitsuharu Misawa	20:26

== 1994 ==
The 1994 Champion Carnival took place from March 19 to April 16, featuring twelve wrestlers participating in a single-block round-robin format. Toshiaki Kawada won the tournament in his fourth appearance. Mitsuharu Misawa was injured during the tournament, causing him to miss most of it.

Final standings
Toshiaki Kawada	19
Steve Williams	19
Stan Hansen	18
Kenta Kobashi	17
Akira Taue	17
Johnny Ace	11
Jun Akiyama	9
John Nord	6
The Eagle	4
Doug Furnas	4
Mitsuharu Misawa	4
Johnny Smith	4

	Ace	Akiyama	Eagle	Furnas	Hansen	Kawada	Kobashi	Misawa	Nord	Smith	Taue	Williams
Ace	—N/a	Draw (30:00)	Ace (15:11)	Ace (14:41)	Hansen (11:53)	Kawada (15:47)	Kobashi (21:22)	Ace (Forfeit)	Ace (15:01)	Ace (14:00)	Taue (12:06)	Williams (14:33)
Akiyama	Draw (30:00)	—N/a	Akiyama (12:27)	Akiyama (12:26)	Hansen (11:49)	Kawada (11:25)	Kobashi (14:40)	Misawa (13:57)	Akiyama (8:00)	Akiyama (15:11)	Taue (11:50)	Williams (12:26)
Eagle	Ace (15:11)	Akiyama (12:27)	—N/a	Eagle (11:12)	Hansen (6:21)	Kawada (12:30)	Kobashi (12:17)	Eagle (Forfeit)	Nord (11:17)	Smith (17:01)	Taue (10:35)	Williams (4:13)
Furnas	Ace (14:41)	Akiyama (12:26)	Eagle (11:12)	—N/a	Hansen (16:24)	Kawada (10:25)	Kobashi (15:25)	Misawa (12:15)	Furnas (12:05)	Furnas (14:28)	Taue (12:29)	Williams (14:38)
Hansen	Hansen (11:53)	Hansen (11:49)	Hansen (6:21)	Hansen (16:24)	—N/a	Hansen (19:38)	Kobashi (26:55)	Hansen (Forfeit)	Hansen (9:03)	Hansen (8:12)	Taue (17:31)	Hansen (16:35)
Kawada	Kawada (15:47)	Kawada (11:25)	Kawada (12:30)	Kawada (10:25)	Hansen (19:38)	—N/a	Kawada (23:06)	Kawada (Forfeit)	Kawada (10:02)	Kawada (9:31)	Kawada (20:20)	Draw (30:00)
Kobashi	Kobashi (21:22)	Kobashi (14:40)	Kobashi (12:17)	Kobashi (15:25)	Kobashi (26:55)	Kawada (23:06)	—N/a	Kobashi (Forfeit)	Kobashi (11:41)	Kobashi (16:45)	Draw (30:00)	Williams (22:10)
Misawa	Ace (Forfeit)	Misawa (13:57)	Eagle (Forfeit)	Misawa (12:15)	Hansen (Forfeit)	Kawada (Forfeit)	Kobashi (Forfeit)	—N/a	Nord (Forfeit)	Smith (Forfeit)	Taue (Forfeit)	Williams (Forfeit)
Nord	Ace (15:01)	Akiyama (8:00)	Nord (11:17)	Furnas (12:05)	Hansen (9:03)	Kawada (10:02)	Kobashi (11:41)	Nord (Forfeit)	—N/a	Nord (7:29)	Taue (10:34)	Williams (10:16)
Smith	Ace (14:00)	Akiyama (15:11)	Smith (17:01)	Furnas (14:28)	Hansen (8:12)	Kawada (9:31)	Kobashi (16:45)	Smith (Forfeit)	Nord (7:29)	—N/a	Taue (11:53)	Williams (12:32)
Taue	Taue (12:06)	Taue (11:50)	Taue (10:35)	Taue (12:29)	Taue (17:31)	Kawada (20:20)	Draw (30:00)	Taue (Forfeit)	Taue (10:34)	Taue (11:53)	—N/a	Williams (15:17)
Williams	Williams (14:33)	Williams (12:26)	Williams (4:13)	Williams (14:38)	Hansen (16:35)	Draw (30:00)	Williams (22:10)	Williams (Forfeit)	Williams (10:16)	Williams (12:32)	Williams (15:17)	—N/a

Final
Toshiaki Kawada	Pin
Steve Williams	25:48

== 1995 ==
The 1995 Champion Carnival took place from March 21 to April 15, featuring eleven wrestlers participating in a single-block round-robin format. Mitsuharu Misawa won the tournament.

There were originally twelve wrestlers scheduled for the tournament, but that number dropped to eleven on March 22 when Steve Williams was suspended from AJPW for one year after being found in possession of painkillers at the airport and returned to the United States.

Final standings
Mitsuharu Misawa	17
Akira Taue	17
Toshiaki Kawada	16
Stan Hansen	16
Kenta Kobashi	13
Johnny Ace	11
Jun Akiyama	6
Doug Furnas	6
Danny Spivey	4
Dan Kroffat	4
Takao Omori	0

	Ace	Akiyama	Furnas	Hansen	Kawada	Kobashi	Kroffat	Misawa	Omori	Spivey	Taue
Ace	—N/a	Ace (11:48)	Ace (13:49)	Hansen (15:17)	Kawada (19:22)	Draw (30:00)	Ace (10:49)	Misawa (19:03)	Ace (12:35)	Ace (9:33)	Taue (14:56)
Akiyama	Ace (11:48)	—N/a	Akiyama (12:26)	Hansen (10:46)	Kawada (15:20)	Kobashi (18:14)	Kroffat (14:32)	Misawa (12:28)	Akiyama (13:41)	Akiyama (8:12)	Taue (10:26)
Furnas	Ace (13:49)	Akiyama (12:26)	—N/a	Hansen (5:23)	Kawada (11:37)	Kobashi (14:48)	Furnas (12:14)	Misawa (11:25)	Furnas (9:18)	Furnas (9:38)	Taue (10:19)
Hansen	Hansen (15:17)	Hansen (10:46)	Hansen (5:23)	—N/a	Kawada (21:04)	Draw (30:00)	Hansen (8:50)	Draw (30:00)	Hansen (4:22)	Hansen (6:58)	Hansen (16:04)
Kawada	Kawada (19:22)	Kawada (15:20)	Kawada (11:37)	Kawada (21:04)	—N/a	Draw (30:00)	Kawada (10:16)	Draw (30:00)	Kawada (11:49)	Kawada (14:55)	Taue (23:51)
Kobashi	Draw (30:00)	Kobashi (18:14)	Kobashi (14:48)	Draw (30:00)	Draw (30:00)	—N/a	Kobashi (15:14)	Misawa (22:31)	Kobashi (14:46)	Kobashi (5:57)	Taue (25:22)
Kroffat	Ace (10:49)	Kroffat (14:32)	Furnas (12:14)	Hansen (8:50)	Kawada (10:16)	Kobashi (15:14)	—N/a	Misawa (12:01)	Kroffat (12:27)	Spivey (4:17)	Taue (10:24)
Misawa	Misawa (19:03)	Misawa (12:28)	Misawa (11:25)	Draw (30:00)	Draw (30:00)	Misawa (22:31)	Misawa (12:01)	—N/a	Misawa (11:26)	Misawa (8:42)	Draw (30:00)
Omori	Ace (12:35)	Akiyama (13:41)	Furnas (9:18)	Hansen (4:22)	Kawada (11:49)	Kobashi (14:46)	Kroffat (12:27)	Misawa (11:26)	—N/a	Spivey (11:41)	Taue (8:40)
Spivey	Ace (9:33)	Akiyama (8:12)	Furnas (9:38)	Hansen (6:58)	Kawada (14:55)	Kobashi (5:57)	Spivey (4:17)	Misawa (8:42)	Spivey (11:41)	—N/a	Taue (9:00)
Taue	Taue (14:56)	Taue (10:26)	Taue (10:19)	Hansen (16:04)	Taue (23:51)	Taue (25:22)	Taue (10:24)	Draw (30:00)	Taue (8:40)	Taue (9:00)	—N/a

Final
Mitsuharu Misawa	Pin
Akira Taue	27:03

== 1996 ==
The 1996 Champion Carnival took place from March 22 to April 20, featuring twelve wrestlers in a single-block round-robin format. Akira Taue, one-half of the reigning AJPW World Tag Team Champions, won the tournament, after having fallen to Mitsuharu Misawa in the 1995 final.

Final standings
Akira Taue	17
Steve Williams	17
Stan Hansen	16
Kenta Kobashi	16
Mitsuharu Misawa	16
Toshiaki Kawada	15
Gary Albright	12
Johnny Ace	9
The Patriot	6
Jun Akiyama	5
Takao Omori	2
Tamon Honda	1

	Ace	Akiyama	Albright	Hansen	Honda	Kawada	Kobashi	Misawa	Omori	Patriot	Taue	Williams
Ace		Ace (16:18)	Draw (30:00)	Hansen (10:04)	Ace (12:31)	Kawada (21:54)	Draw (30:00)	Draw (30:00)	Ace (13:43)	Patriot (14:24)	Taue (19:42)	Williams (18:14)
Akiyama	Ace (16:18)		Albright (8:19)	Hansen (7:02)	Draw (30:00)	Kawada (1:45)	Kobashi (18:34)	Misawa (17:56)	Akiyama (3:15)	Akiyama (14:05)	Taue (13:26)	Williams (8:15)
Albright	Draw (30:00)	Albright (8:19)		Hansen (11:26)	Albright (8:26)	Albright (17:38)	Kobashi (14:09)	Misawa (18:14)	Albright (6:56)	Albright (10:49)	Taue (15:15)	Draw (30:00)
Hansen	Hansen (10:04)	Hansen (7:02)	Hansen (11:26)	—N/a	Hansen (4:59)	Draw (30:00)	Kobashi (22:15)	Hansen (17:31)	Hansen (5:15)	Hansen (12:44)	Taue (15:08)	Draw (30:00)
Honda	Ace (12:31)	Draw (30:00)	Albright (8:26)	Hansen (4:59)	—N/a	Kawada (9:30)	Kobashi (16:31)	Misawa (10:10)	Omori (14:16)	Patriot (10:04)	Taue (10:40)	Williams (4:57)
Kawada	Kawada (21:54)	Kawada (1:45)	Albright (17:38)	Draw (30:00)	Kawada (9:30)	—N/a	Kawada (29:38)	Draw (30:00)	Kawada (7:19)	Kawada (7:51)	Draw (30:00)	Williams (17:30)
Kobashi	Draw (30:00)	Kobashi (18:34)	Kobashi (14:09)	Kobashi (22:15)	Kobashi (16:31)	Kawada (29:38)	—N/a	Misawa (24:07)	Kobashi (14:29)	Kobashi (18:07)	Draw (30:00)	Kobashi (27:53)
Misawa	Draw (30:00)	Misawa (17:56)	Misawa (18:14)	Hansen (17:31)	Misawa (10:10)	Draw (30:00)	Misawa (24:07)	—N/a	Misawa (10:23)	Misawa (14:42)	Misawa (18:18)	Williams (19:59)
Omori	Ace (13:43)	Akiyama (3:15)	Albright (6:56)	Hansen (5:15)	Omori (14:16)	Kawada (7:19)	Kobashi (14:29)	Misawa (10:23)	—N/a	Patriot (11:34)	Taue (8:55)	Williams (6:34)
Patriot	Patriot (14:24)	Akiyama (14:05)	Albright (10:49)	Hansen (12:44)	Patriot (10:04)	Kawada (7:51)	Kobashi (18:07)	Misawa (14:42)	Patriot (11:34)	—N/a	Taue (15:38)	Williams (16:07)
Taue	Taue (19:42)	Taue (13:26)	Taue (15:15)	Taue (15:08)	Taue (10:40)	Draw (30:00)	Draw (30:00)	Misawa (18:18)	Taue (8:55)	Taue (15:38)	—N/a	Draw (30:00)
Williams	Williams (18:14)	Williams (8:15)	Draw (30:00)	Draw (30:00)	Williams (4:57)	Williams (17:30)	Kobashi (27:53)	Williams (19:59)	Williams (6:34)	Williams (16:07)	Draw (30:00)	—N/a

Final
Akira Taue	Pin
Steve Williams	21:41

== 1997 ==
The 1997 Champion Carnival was held from March 22 to April 19, featuring thirteen wrestlers in a single-block round-robin format. Due to a three-way tie for first place between Toshiaki Kawada, Kenta Kobashi and Mitsuharu Misawa, a one-night round-robin playoff was contested among them with the winner claiming the tournament.

Final standings
Toshiaki Kawada	19
Kenta Kobashi	19
Mitsuharu Misawa	19
Stan Hansen	18
Akira Taue	18
Steve Williams	18
Gary Albright	12
Johnny Ace	10
Jun Akiyama	9
Kamala II	6
Tamon Honda	4
Takao Omori	4
Jun Izumida	0

	Ace	Akiyama	Albright	Hansen	Honda	Izumida	Kamala	Kawada	Kobashi	Misawa	Omori	Taue	Williams
Ace	—N/a	Akiyama (2:29)	Ace (11:17)	Hansen (14:08)	Ace (14:52)	Ace (Forfeit)	Ace (14:19)	Kawada (22:37)	Kobashi (16:39)	Misawa (26:27)	Ace (18:23)	Taue (16:38)	Williams (20:44)
Akiyama	Akiyama (2:29)	—N/a	Albright (6:50)	Draw (30:00)	Akiyama (14:46)	Akiyama (Forfeit)	Kamala (12:39)	Kawada (17:16)	Kobashi (20:13)	Misawa (20:33)	Akiyama (11:25)	Taue (11:25)	Williams (14:12)
Albright	Ace (11:17)	Albright (6:50)	—N/a	Hansen (9:47)	Albright (8:08)	Albright (Forfeit)	Albright (6:51)	Kawada (7:27)	Kobashi (12:39)	Misawa (13:06)	Albright (4:58)	Taue (8:18)	Albright (11:21)
Hansen	Hansen (14:08)	Draw (30:00)	Hansen (9:47)	—N/a	Hansen (8:05)	Hansen (Forfeit)	Hansen (7:17)	Hansen (10:45)	Kobashi (19:51)	Misawa (17:59)	Hansen (10:18)	Hansen (15:06)	Draw (30:00)
Honda	Ace (14:52)	Akiyama (14:46)	Albright (8:08)	Hansen (8:05)	—N/a	Honda (Forfeit)	Kamala (10:09)	Kawada (7:32)	Kobashi (13:00)	Misawa (10:15)	Honda (13:38)	Taue (9:45)	Williams (8:45)
Izumida	Ace (Forfeit)	Akiyama (Forfeit)	Albright (Forfeit)	Hansen (Forfeit)	Honda (Forfeit)	—N/a	Kamala (Forfeit)	Kawada (Forfeit)	Kobashi (Forfeit)	Misawa (Forfeit)	Omori (Forfeit)	Taue (Forfeit)	Williams (Forfeit)
Kamala	Ace (14:19)	Kamala (12:39)	Albright (6:51)	Hansen (7:17)	Kamala (10:09)	Kamala (Forfeit)	—N/a	Kawada (7:07)	Kobashi (13:23)	Misawa (9:48)	Omori (12:38)	Taue (6:50)	Williams (9:43)
Kawada	Kawada (22:37)	Kawada (17:16)	Kawada (7:27)	Hansen (10:45)	Kawada (7:32)	Kawada (Forfeit)	Kawada (7:07)	—N/a	Draw (30:00)	Draw (30:00)	Kawada (9:38)	Kawada (14:17)	Draw (30:00)
Kobashi	Kobashi (16:39)	Kobashi (20:13)	Kobashi (12:39)	Kobashi (19:51)	Kobashi (13:00)	Kobashi (Forfeit)	Kobashi (13:23)	Draw (30:00)	—N/a	Kobashi (24:09)	Kobashi (13:53)	Taue (21:22)	Williams (23:50)
Misawa	Misawa (26:27)	Misawa (20:33)	Misawa (13:06)	Misawa (17:59)	Misawa (10:15)	Misawa (Forfeit)	Misawa (9:48)	Draw (30:00)	Kobashi (24:09)	—N/a	Misawa (12:53)	Misawa (12:14)	Williams (18:21)
Omori	Ace (18:23)	Akiyama (11:25)	Albright (4:58)	Hansen (10:18)	Honda (13:38)	Omori (Forfeit)	Omori (12:38)	Kawada (9:38)	Kobashi (13:53)	Misawa (12:53)	—N/a	Taue (8:31)	Williams (16:27)
Taue	Taue (16:38)	Taue (11:25)	Taue (8:18)	Hansen (15:06)	Taue (9:45)	Taue (Forfeit)	Taue (6:50)	Kawada (14:17)	Taue (21:22)	Misawa (12:14)	Taue (8:31)	—N/a	Taue (18:30)
Williams	Williams (20:44)	Williams (14:12)	Albright (11:21)	Draw (30:00)	Williams (8:45)	Williams (Forfeit)	Williams (9:43)	Draw (30:00)	Williams (23:50)	Williams (18:21)	Williams (16:27)	Taue (18:30)	—N/a

Playoff Final standings
Toshiaki Kawada	4
Kenta Kobashi	1
Mitsuharu Misawa	1

	Kawada	Kobashi	Misawa
Kawada	—N/a	Kawada (21:27)	Kawada (6:09)
Kobashi	Kawada (21:27)	—N/a	Draw (30:00)
Misawa	Kawada (6:09)	Draw (30:00)	—N/a

== 1998 ==
The 1998 Champion Carnival was held from March 21 to April 18, featuring thirteen wrestlers in a single-block round-robin format, with the top two finishers wrestling in the final.

The reigning Triple Crown Heavyweight Champion Mitsuharu Misawa won the tournament for the second time, also having won in 1995.

Final standings
Jun Akiyama	19
Mitsuharu Misawa	19
Kenta Kobashi	18
Toshiaki Kawada	18
Stan Hansen	17
Steve Williams	17
Johnny Ace	14
Gary Albright	12
Akira Taue	8
Takao Omori	6
Giant Kimala	4
Wolf Hawkfield	4
Jun Izumida	0

	Ace	Akiyama	Albright	Hansen	Hawkfield	Izumida	Kamala	Kawada	Kobashi	Misawa	Omori	Taue	Williams
Ace	—N/a	Akiyama (11:13)	Ace (9:48)	Hansen (10:18)	Ace (12:57)	Ace (10:56)	Ace (10:54)	Draw (30:00)	Draw (30:00)	Misawa (16:48)	Ace (10:41)	Ace (8:09)	Williams (10:14)
Akiyama	Akiyama (11:13)	—N/a	Akiyama (6:02)	Akiyama (15:01)	Akiyama (12:42)	Akiyama (17:10)	Akiyama (10:43)	Kawada (18:01)	Draw (30:00)	Draw (30:00)	Akiyama (17:41)	Akiyama (Forfeit)	Draw (30:00)
Albright	Ace (9:48)	Akiyama (6:02)	—N/a	Hansen (10:54)	Albright (10:38)	Albright (12:17)	Albright (8:48)	Kawada (9:17)	Albright (13:58)	Misawa (12:35)	Albright (8:42)	Albright (Forfeit)	Williams (10:04)
Hansen	Hansen (10:18)	Akiyama (15:01)	Hansen (10:54)	—N/a	Hansen (8:00)	Hansen (7:22)	Hansen (4:10)	Kawada (17:50)	Kobashi (19:32)	Draw (30:00)	Hansen (10:52)	Hansen (6:13)	Hansen (18:58)
Hawkfield	Ace (12:57)	Akiyama (12:42)	Albright (10:38)	Hansen (8:00)	—N/a	Hawkfield (12:00)	Kamala (11:34)	Kawada (12:05)	Kobashi (9:09)	Misawa (10:50)	Hawkfield (12:04)	Taue (6:23)	Williams (15:19)
Izumida	Ace (10:56)	Akiyama (17:10)	Albright (12:17)	Hansen (7:22)	Hawkfield (12:00)	—N/a	Kamala (11:23)	Kawada (3:59)	Kobashi (12:29)	Misawa (11:34)	Omori (12:03)	Taue (5:46)	Williams (9:41)
Kamala	Ace (10:54)	Akiyama (10:43)	Albright (8:48)	Hansen (4:10)	Kamala (11:34)	Kamala (11:23)	—N/a	Kawada (4:05)	Kobashi (12:35)	Misawa (7:22)	Omori (12:44)	Taue (9:41)	Williams (11:50)
Kawada	Draw (30:00)	Kawada (18:01)	Kawada (9:17)	Kawada (17:50)	Kawada (12:05)	Kawada (3:59)	Kawada (4:05)	—N/a	Kobashi (19:34)	Draw (30:00)	Kawada (11:52)	Kawada (9:17)	Williams (16:29)
Kobashi	Draw (30:00)	Draw (30:00)	Albright (13:58)	Kobashi (19:32)	Kobashi (9:09)	Kobashi (12:29)	Kobashi (12:35)	Kobashi (19:34)	—N/a	Misawa (25:00)	Kobashi (12:42)	Kobashi (Forfeit)	Kobashi (20:06)
Misawa	Misawa (16:48)	Draw (30:00)	Misawa (12:35)	Draw (30:00)	Misawa (10:50)	Misawa (11:34)	Misawa (7:22)	Draw (30:00)	Misawa (25:00)	—N/a	Misawa (13:56)	Taue (15:39)	Misawa (18:22)
Omori	Ace (10:41)	Akiyama (17:41)	Albright (8:42)	Hansen (10:52)	Hawkfield (12:04)	Omori (12:03)	Omori (12:44)	Kawada (11:52)	Kobashi (12:42)	Misawa (13:56)	—N/a	Omori (Forfeit)	Williams (16:26)
Taue	Ace (8:09)	Akiyama (Forfeit)	Albright (Forfeit)	Hansen (6:13)	Taue (6:23)	Taue (5:46)	Taue (9:41)	Kawada (9:17)	Kobashi (Forfeit)	Taue (15:39)	Omori (Forfeit)	—N/a	Williams (12:44)
Williams	Williams (10:14)	Draw (30:00)	Williams (10:04)	Hansen (18:58)	Williams (15:19)	Williams (9:41)	Williams (11:50)	Williams (16:29)	Kobashi (20:06)	Misawa (18:22)	Williams (16:26)	Williams (12:44)	—N/a

Final
Jun Akiyama	Pin
Mitsuharu Misawa	22:05

== 1999 ==
The 1999 Champion Carnival was held from March 24 to April 16, featuring ten wrestlers in a single-block round-robin format, with the top two finishers wrestling in the final.

Vader, reigning Triple Crown Heavyweight Champion, won the tournament in his first appearance.

Final standings
Kenta Kobashi	16
Vader	15
Mitsuharu Misawa	14
Jun Akiyama	11
Akira Taue	11
Johnny Ace	9
Gary Albright	8
Yoshihiro Takayama	3
Jinsei Shinzaki	2
Takao Omori	1

	Ace	Akiyama	Albright	Kobashi	Misawa	Omori	Shinzaki	Takayama	Taue	Vader
Ace	—N/a	Ace (10:23)	Albright (7:33)	Draw (30:00)	Misawa (12:24)	Ace (13:58)	Ace (12:47)	Ace (8:31)	Taue (11:58)	Vader (9:19)
Akiyama	Ace (10:23)	—N/a	Akiyama (8:11)	Kobashi (24:37)	Draw (30:00)	Akiyama (22:03)	Akiyama (18:19)	Akiyama (9:12)	Akiyama (12:48)	Vader (9:22)
Albright	Albright (7:33)	Akiyama (8:11)	—N/a	Kobashi (12:25)	Misawa (10:37)	Albright (9:27)	Albright (12:36)	Albright (7:19)	Taue (9:44)	Vader (7:23)
Kobashi	Draw (30:00)	Kobashi (24:37)	Kobashi (12:25)	—N/a	Kobashi (24:15)	Kobashi (17:14)	Kobashi (16:20)	Kobashi (11:52)	Kobashi (17:06)	Draw (30:00)
Misawa	Misawa (12:24)	Draw (30:00)	Misawa (10:37)	Kobashi (24:15)	—N/a	Misawa (12:16)	Misawa (16:54)	Misawa (12:47)	Draw (30:00)	Misawa (10:52)
Omori	Ace (13:58)	Akiyama (22:03)	Albright (9:27)	Kobashi (17:14)	Misawa (12:16)	—N/a	Shinzaki (19:35)	Draw (30:00)	Taue (15:36)	Vader (2:10)
Shinzaki	Ace (12:47)	Akiyama (18:19)	Albright (12:36)	Kobashi (16:20)	Misawa (16:54)	Shinzaki (19:35)	—N/a	Takayama (15:12)	Taue (10:53)	Vader (12:40)
Takayama	Ace (8:31)	Akiyama (9:12)	Albright (7:19)	Kobashi (11:52)	Misawa (12:47)	Draw (30:00)	Takayama (15:12)	—N/a	Taue (11:00)	Vader (5:23)
Taue	Taue (11:58)	Akiyama (12:48)	Taue (9:44)	Kobashi (17:06)	Draw (30:00)	Taue (15:36)	Taue (10:53)	Taue (11:00)	—N/a	Vader (7:41)
Vader	Vader (9:19)	Vader (9:22)	Vader (7:23)	Draw (30:00)	Misawa (10:52)	Vader (2:10)	Vader (12:40)	Vader (5:23)	Vader (7:41)	—N/a

Final
Kenta Kobashi	Pin
Vader	19:11

== 2000 ==
The 2000 Champion Carnival was held from March 24 to April 15, featuring sixteen wrestlers in a single-elimination format.

Kenta Kobashi, reigning Triple Crown Heavyweight Champion, won the tournament in his 10th consecutive appearance.

First Round (March 24 to April 1)
Akira Taue	Pin
Steve Williams	17:15
Wolf Hawkfield	Pin
Jun Izumida	13:02
Mike Barton	Pin
Masao Inoue	14:17
Jun Akiyama	Pin
Takao Omori	0:07
Toshiaki Kawada	Pin
Mitsuharu Misawa	15:35
Yoshihiro Takayama	Pin
Vader	6:04
Tamon Honda	Pin
Johnny Smith	15:12
Johnny Ace	Pin
Kenta Kobashi	20:56

Quarterfinals (April 2 to 8)
Steve Williams	Forf
Jun Izumida
Mike Barton	Pin
Takao Omori	15:55
Mitsuharu Misawa	Sub
Vader	11:31
Johnny Smith	Sub
Kenta Kobashi	17:43

Semifinals (April 9 and 11)
Steve Williams	Pin
Takao Omori	10:33
Mitsuharu Misawa	Pin
Kenta Kobashi	26:08

Final (April 15)
Takao Omori	Pin
Kenta Kobashi	25:12

== 2001 ==
The 2001 Champion Carnival was held from March 23 to April 11, featuring ten wrestlers in a single-block round-robin format, with the top two finishers wrestling in the final.

Genichiro Tenryu, reigning Triple Crown Heavyweight Champion, won the tournament in his second appearance, his first since 1982.

Final standings
Taiyō Kea	15
Genichiro Tenryu	15
Toshiaki Kawada	14
Mike Barton	13
Steve Williams	13
Yoshiaki Fujiwara	7
Johnny Smith	7
George Hines	2
Mitsuya Nagai	2
Jim Steele	2

	Barton	Fujiwara	Hines	Kawada	Kea	Nagai	Smith	Steele	Tenryu	Williams
Barton	—N/a	Barton (14:02)	Barton (17:13)	Barton (16:12)	Kea (13:17)	Barton (12:48)	Barton (19:01)	Barton (15:07)	Tenryu (11:17)	Draw (30:00)
Fujiwara	Barton (14:02)	—N/a	Fujiwara (10:34)	Kawada (12:11)	Kea (7:57)	Fujiwara (10:31)	Draw (30:00)	Fujiwara (9:06)	Tenryu (5:23)	Williams (7:15)
Hines	Barton (17:13)	Fujiwara (10:34)	—N/a	Kawada (2:24)	Kea (14:41)	Hines (11:56)	Smith (17:25)	Steele (14:36)	Tenryu (4:38)	Williams (14:08)
Kawada	Barton (16:12)	Kawada (12:11)	Kawada (2:24)	—N/a	Kawada (20:59)	Kawada (11:50)	Kawada (22:39)	Kawada (9:46)	Kawada (8:17)	Williams (16:59)
Kea	Kea (13:17)	Kea (7:57)	Kea (14:41)	Kawada (20:59)	—N/a	Kea (16:15)	Kea (20:18)	Kea (14:46)	Draw (30:00)	Kea (18:35)
Nagai	Barton (12:48)	Fujiwara (10:31)	Hines (11:56)	Kawada (11:50)	Kea (16:15)	—N/a	Smith (14:00)	Nagai (9:12)	Tenryu (3:08)	Williams (4:13)
Smith	Barton (19:01)	Draw (30:00)	Smith (17:25)	Kawada (22:39)	Kea (20:18)	Smith (14:00)	—N/a	Smith (16:05)	Tenryu (5:51)	Williams (12:24)
Steele	Barton (15:07)	Fujiwara (9:06)	Steele (14:36)	Kawada (9:46)	Kea (14:46)	Nagai (9:12)	Smith (16:05)	—N/a	Tenryu (4:45)	Williams (12:44)
Tenryu	Tenryu (11:17)	Tenryu (5:23)	Tenryu (4:38)	Kawada (8:17)	Draw (30:00)	Tenryu (3:08)	Tenryu (5:51)	Tenryu (4:45)	—N/a	Tenryu (10:28)
Williams	Draw (30:00)	Williams (7:15)	Williams (14:08)	Williams (16:59)	Kea (18:35)	Williams (4:13)	Williams (12:24)	Williams (12:44)	Tenryu (10:28)	—N/a

Final
Taiyō Kea	Pin
Genichiro Tenryu	17:08

== 2002 ==
The 2002 Champion Carnival was held from March 23 to April 10, re-introduced the dual-block round-robin format used in 1991 and 1992, this time with seven men in each block; the top two scorers in each would advance to a four-man tournament, with Block A's first place finalist facing Block B's runner-up, and vice versa, and the winners wrestling in the final. Despite the Triple Crown Heavyweight Championship being vacant as a result of Toshiaki Kawada injuring his knee after his match against Arashi (thereby forfeiting all his other scheduled matches), All Japan decided not to use the tournament to fill the vacancy, citing the time limit for tournament matches (30 minutes as opposed to 60 in championship bouts).

The winner, Keiji Muto, became the first man in history to win both the Champion Carnival and the G1 Climax, as well as the second man (after Vader) to win the Carnival in his first appearance.

Final standings
Block A		Block B	
Satoshi Kojima	11	Genichiro Tenryu	12
Mike Barton	10	Keiji Muto	8
Jim Steele	6	Taiyō Kea	7
Mitsuya Nagai	6	Steve Williams	7
Yoji Anjo	5	Mike Rotundo	3
Toshiaki Kawada	2	George Hines	3
Arashi	2	Nobutaka Araya	2

Block A	Anjo	Arashi	Barton	Kawada	Kojima	Nagai	Steele
Anjo	—N/a	Anjo (9:45)	Barton (13:49)	Anjo (Forfeit)	Kojima (18:25)	Draw (30:00)	Steele (14:07)
Arashi	Anjo (9:45)	—N/a	Barton (9:55)	Kawada (3:20)	Kojima (13:05)	Nagai (10:56)	Arashi (11:10)
Barton	Barton (13:49)	Barton (9:55)	—N/a	Barton (Forfeit)	Draw (30:00)	Draw (30:00)	Barton (16:51)
Kawada	Anjo (Forfeit)	Kawada (3:20)	Barton (Forfeit)	—N/a	Kojima (Forfeit)	Nagai (Forfeit)	Steele (Forfeit)
Kojima	Kojima (18:25)	Kojima (13:05)	Draw (30:00)	Kojima (Forfeit)	—N/a	Kojima (18:06)	Kojima (17:00)
Nagai	Draw (30:00)	Nagai (10:56)	Draw (30:00)	Nagai (Forfeit)	Kojima (18:06)	—N/a	Steele (11:56)
Steele	Steele (14:07)	Arashi (11:10)	Barton (16:51)	Steele (Forfeit)	Kojima (17:00)	Steele (11:56)	—N/a
Block B	Araya	Hines	Kea	Muto	Rotundo	Tenryu	Williams
Araya	—N/a	Hines (16:15)	Kea (15:27)	Muto (5:13)	Araya (9:19)	Tenryu (7:05)	Williams (5:11)
Hines	Hines (16:15)	—N/a	Kea (14:18)	Muto (8:26)	Rotundo (11:23)	Tenryu (6:54)	Draw (30:00)
Kea	Kea (15:27)	Kea (14:18)	—N/a	Muto (24:04)	Draw (30:00)	Tenryu (15:17)	Kea (13:54)
Muto	Muto (5:13)	Muto (8:26)	Muto (24:04)	—N/a	Muto (13:09)	Tenryu (14:15)	Williams (15:16)
Rotundo	Araya (9:19)	Rotundo (11:23)	Draw (30:00)	Muto (13:09)	—N/a	Tenryu (2:09)	Williams (10:28)
Tenryu	Tenryu (7:05)	Tenryu (6:54)	Tenryu (15:17)	Tenryu (14:15)	Tenryu (2:09)	—N/a	Tenryu (6:32)
Williams	Williams (5:11)	Draw (30:00)	Kea (13:54)	Williams (15:16)	Williams (10:28)	Tenryu (6:32)	—N/a

Semifinals
A1	Satoshi Kojima	Sub
B2	Keiji Muto	15:46
B1	Genichiro Tenryu	Pin
A2	Mike Barton	5:38

Final
B2	Keiji Muto	Pin
A2	Mike Barton	9:50

== 2003 ==
The 2003 version of the Champion Carnival took place between March 22 and March 28. Keiji Muto, Satoshi Kojima, George Hines, Johnny Smith, Arashi and Nobutaka Araya received byes to the quarterfinals, leaving Yoji Anjo, Gigantes, The Gladiator and Big John Tenta to fight in the first round. Shinya Hashimoto, reigning Triple Crown Heavyweight Champion, did not participate, citing prior commitments to his Pro Wrestling Zero1 promotion.

First Round
Yoji Anjo	Pin
Gigantes	9:18
The Gladiator	Pin
Big John Tenta	13:04

Quarterfinals
Gigantes	Pin
Satoshi Kojima	16:23
George Hines	Pin
Johnny Smith	25:02
Big John Tenta	Pin
Keiji Muto	12:21
Arashi	Pin
Nobutaka Araya	12:34

Semifinals
Satoshi Kojima	Pin
George Hines	16:16
Keiji Muto	Pin
Arashi	18:03

Final
Satoshi Kojima	Pin
Arashi	16:30

== 2004 ==
The 2004 version of the Champion Carnival took between April 10 and April 20.

Final standings
Block A		Block B	
Kensuke Sasaki	7	Takao Omori	7
Keiji Muto	5	Satoshi Kojima	5
Jamal	4	Taiyō Kea	4
Kaz Hayashi	2	Toshiaki Kawada	2
Arashi	2	Nobutaka Araya	2

Block A	Arashi	Hayashi	Jamal	Muto	Sasaki
Arashi	—N/a	Hayashi (9:27)	Arashi (11:13)	Muto (10:34)	Sasaki (5:41)
Hayashi	Hayashi (9:27)	—N/a	Jamal (10:56)	Muto (13:31)	Sasaki (14:41)
Jamal	Arashi (11:13)	Jamal (10:56)	—N/a	Jamal (16:56)	Sasaki (13:17)
Muto	Muto (10:34)	Muto (13:31)	Jamal (16:56)	—N/a	Draw (30:00)
Sasaki	Sasaki (5:41)	Sasaki (14:41)	Sasaki (13:17)	Draw (30:00)	—N/a
Block B	Araya	Kawada	Kea	Kojima	Omori
Araya	—N/a	Kawada (4:02)	Kea (7:16)	Araya (17:55)	Omori (12:22)
Kawada	Kawada (4:02)	—N/a	Kea (Forfeit)	Kojima (Forfeit)	Omori (Forfeit)
Kea	Kea (7:16)	Kea (Forfeit)	—N/a	Kojima (18:44)	Omori (14:02)
Kojima	Araya (17:55)	Kojima (Forfeit)	Kojima (18:44)	—N/a	Draw (30:00)
Omori	Omori (12:22)	Omori (Forfeit)	Omori (14:02)	Draw (30:00)	—N/a

Semifinals
A1	Kensuke Sasaki	Pin
B2	Satoshi Kojima	16:51
B1	Takao Omori	Pin
A2	Keiji Muto	11:09

Final
A1	Kensuke Sasaki	Pin
A2	Keiji Muto	15:33

== 2005 ==
The 2005 version of the Champion Carnival took place between April 9 and April 20. Kensuke Sasaki, the winner of this edition, was the second man to win both Champion Carnival and G1 Climax tournaments, the first man being Keiji Muto.

Final standings
Block A		Block B	
Satoshi Kojima	7	Toshiaki Kawada	7
Kensuke Sasaki	6	Jamal	6
Taiyō Kea	5	Chuck Palumbo	5
Arashi	4	Keiji Muto	5
Giant Bernard	4	Buchanan	5
Shuji Kondo	2	Suwama	2

Block A	Arashi	Bernard	Kea	Kojima	Kondo	Sasaki
Arashi	—N/a	Arashi (2:38)	Kea (4:01)	Kojima (15:09)	Kondo (10:33)	Arashi (7:11)
Bernard	Arashi (2:38)	—N/a	DCO (10:51)	Kojima (8:56)	Bernard (3:20)	Bernard (7:50)
Kea	Kea (4:01)	DCO (10:51)	—N/a	Draw (30:00)	Kea (10:34)	Sasaki (21:01)
Kojima	Kojima (15:09)	Kojima (8:56)	Draw (30:00)	—N/a	Kojima (15:44)	Sasaki (29:29)
Kondo	Kondo (10:33)	Bernard (3:20)	Kea (10:34)	Kojima (15:44)	—N/a	Sasaki (14:29)
Sasaki	Arashi (7:11)	Bernard (7:50)	Sasaki (21:01)	Sasaki (29:29)	Sasaki (14:29)	—N/a
Block B	Buchanan	Jamal	Kawada	Muto	Palumbo	Suwama
Buchanan	—N/a	Buchanan (8:50)	Kawada (7:06)	Muto (9:13)	Draw (30:00)	Buchanan (8:34)
Jamal	Buchanan (8:50)	—N/a	Jamal (17:31)	Muto (13:14)	Jamal (14:27)	Jamal (6:08)
Kawada	Kawada (7:06)	Jamal (17:31)	—N/a	Draw (30:00)	Kawada (9:32)	Kawada (3:36)
Muto	Muto (9:13)	Muto (13:14)	Draw (30:00)	—N/a	Palumbo (14:39)	Suwama (13:09)
Palumbo	Draw (30:00)	Jamal (14:27)	Kawada (9:32)	Palumbo (14:39)	—N/a	Palumbo (9:18)
Suwama	Buchanan (8:34)	Jamal (6:08)	Kawada (3:36)	Suwama (13:09)	Palumbo (9:18)	—N/a

Semifinals
A1	Satoshi Kojima	Pin
B2	Jamal	16:22
B1	Toshiaki Kawada	Pin
A2	Kensuke Sasaki	19:11

Final
B2	Jamal	Pin
A2	Kensuke Sasaki	17:32

== 2006 ==
The 2006 version of the Champion Carnival took place between April 7 and April 20.

Final standings
Block A		Block B	
Suwama	7	Minoru Suzuki	9
Taiyō Kea	6	Satoshi Kojima	8
Kensuke Sasaki	5	D'Lo Brown	5
Keiji Muto	5	Arashi	4
Yutaka Yoshie	5	Matt Morgan	2
Buchanan	2	Katsuhiko Nakajima	2

Block A	Buchanan	Kea	Muto	Sasaki	Suwama	Yoshie
Buchanan	—N/a	Kea (12:53)	Buchanan (11:54)	Sasaki (12:20)	Suwama (17:18)	Yoshie (12:10)
Kea	Kea (12:53)	—N/a	Draw (30:00)	Kea (18:35)	Suwama (10:15)	Draw (30:00)
Muto	Buchanan (11:54)	Draw (30:00)	—N/a	Draw (30:00)	Draw (30:00)	Muto (18:22)
Sasaki	Sasaki (12:20)	Kea (18:35)	Draw (30:00)	—N/a	Suwama (12:28)	Sasaki (10:35)
Suwama	Suwama (17:18)	Suwama (10:15)	Draw (30:00)	Suwama (12:28)	—N/a	Yoshie (16:06)
Yoshie	Yoshie (12:10)	Draw (30:00)	Muto (18:22)	Sasaki (10:35)	Yoshie (16:06)	—N/a
Block B	Arashi	Brown	Kojima	Morgan	Nakajima	Suzuki
Arashi	—N/a	Brown (4:28)	Kojima (11:36)	Arashi (7:46)	Arashi (7:18)	Suzuki (4:50)
Brown	Brown (4:28)	—N/a	Draw (30:00)	Brown (7:32)	Nakajima (7:10)	Suzuki (9:53)
Kojima	Kojima (11:36)	Draw (30:00)	—N/a	Kojima (10:30)	Kojima (9:15)	Draw (30:00)
Morgan	Arashi (7:46)	Brown (7:32)	Kojima (10:30)	—N/a	Morgan (5:46)	Suzuki (5:13)
Nakajima	Arashi (7:18)	Nakajima (7:10)	Kojima (9:15)	Morgan (5:46)	—N/a	Suzuki (8:13)
Suzuki	Suzuki (4:50)	Suzuki (9:53)	Draw (30:00)	Suzuki (5:13)	Suzuki (8:13)	—N/a

Semifinals
A1	Suwama	CO
B2	Satoshi Kojima	15:12
B1	Minoru Suzuki	Pin
A2	Taiyō Kea	11:24

Final
A1	Suwama	Pin
A2	Taiyō Kea	20:21

== 2007 ==
The 2007 version of the Champion Carnival took place between March 26 and March 30.

Final standings
Block A		Block B	
Keiji Muto	6	Toshiaki Kawada	5
Kensuke Sasaki	5	Satoshi Kojima	4
Suwama	5	Tajiri	4
Taiyō Kea	4	Minoru Suzuki	3
Toru Owashi	0	RO'Z	2

Block A	Kea	Muto	Owashi	Sasaki	Suwama
Kea	—N/a	Muto (19:21)	Kea (14:24)	Draw (30:00)	Draw (30:00)
Muto	Muto (19:21)	—N/a	Muto (17:23)	Sasaki (25:37)	Muto (25:17)
Owashi	Kea (14:24)	Muto (17:23)	—N/a	Sasaki (5:57)	Suwama (10:14)
Sasaki	Draw (30:00)	Sasaki (25:37)	Sasaki (5:57)	—N/a	Suwama (0:16)
Suwama	Draw (30:00)	Muto (25:17)	Suwama (10:14)	Suwama (0:16)	—N/a
Block B	Kawada	Kojima	RO'Z	Suzuki	Tajiri
Kawada	—N/a	Kawada (15:24)	RO'Z (6:15)	Draw (30:00)	Kawada (14:09)
Kojima	Kawada (15:24)	—N/a	Kojima (10:53)	Kojima (17:31)	DCO (11:58)
RO'Z	RO'Z (6:15)	Kojima (10:53)	—N/a	Suzuki (7:24)	Tajiri (5:04)
Suzuki	Draw (30:00)	Kojima (17:31)	Suzuki (7:24)	—N/a	Tajiri (4:17)
Tajiri	Kawada (14:09)	DCO (11:58)	Tajiri (5:04)	Tajiri (4:17)	—N/a

Final
A1	Keiji Muto	Pin
B1	Toshiaki Kawada	22:28

== 2008 ==
The 2008 version of the Champion Carnival took place between April 5 and April 9.

Final standings
Block A		Block B	
Hiroshi Tanahashi	6	Suwama	5
Toshiaki Kawada	5	Joe Doering	4
Keiji Muto	5	Kensuke Sasaki	4
Satoshi Kojima	4	Minoru Suzuki	4
Taiyō Kea	0	Osamu Nishimura	3

Block A	Kawada	Kea	Kojima	Muto	Tanahashi
Kawada	—N/a	Kawada (13:35)	Kojima (15:41)	Kawada (10:32)	Draw (30:00)
Kea	Kawada (13:35)	—N/a	Kojima (14:53)	Muto (16:41)	Tanahashi (20:53)
Kojima	Kojima (15:41)	Kojima (14:53)	—N/a	Muto (17:36)	Tanahashi (18:10)
Muto	Kawada (10:32)	Muto (16:41)	Muto (17:36)	—N/a	Draw (30:00)
Tanahashi	Draw (30:00)	Tanahashi (20:53)	Tanahashi (18:10)	Draw (30:00)	—N/a
Block B	Doering	Nishimura	Sasaki	Suwama	Suzuki
Doering	—N/a	Doering (25:20)	Sasaki (8:01)	Suwama (9:18)	Doering (10:55)
Nishimura	Doering (25:20)	—N/a	Draw (30:00)	Suwama (15:13)	Nishimura (3:58)
Sasaki	Sasaki (8:01)	Draw (30:00)	—N/a	Draw (30:00)	Suzuki (12:22)
Suwama	Suwama (9:18)	Suwama (15:13)	Draw (30:00)	—N/a	Suzuki (9:31)
Suzuki	Doering (10:55)	Nishimura (3:58)	Suzuki (12:22)	Suzuki (9:31)	—N/a

Final
A1	Hiroshi Tanahashi	Pin
B1	Suwama	29:49

== 2009 ==
The 2009 version of the Champion Carnival tournament took place between April 5 and April 12.

Final standings
Block A		Block B	
Keiji Muto	8	Satoshi Kojima	8
Kaz Hayashi	7	Minoru Suzuki	6
Yoshihiro Takayama	6	Taiyō Kea	5
Osamu Nishimura	5	Suwama	5
Joe Doering	4	Ryota Hama	4
Seiya Sanada	0	Zodiac	2

Block A	Doering	Hayashi	Muto	Nishimura	Sanada	Takayama
Doering	—N/a	Hayashi (11:54)	Muto (14:03)	Doering (15:17)	Doering (9:06)	Takayama (8:45)
Hayashi	Hayashi (11:54)	—N/a	Hayashi (19:08)	Draw (30:00)	Hayashi (10:57)	Takayama (18:10)
Muto	Muto (14:03)	Hayashi (19:08)	—N/a	Muto (11:06)	Muto (13:57)	Muto (18:10)
Nishimura	Doering (15:17)	Draw (30:00)	Muto (11:06)	—N/a	Nishimura (15:35)	Nishimura (8:33)
Sanada	Doering (9:06)	Hayashi (10:57)	Muto (13:57)	Nishimura (15:35)	—N/a	Takayama (9:41)
Takayama	Takayama (8:45)	Takayama (18:10)	Muto (18:10)	Nishimura (8:33)	Takayama (9:41)	—N/a
Block B	Hama	Kea	Kojima	Suwama	Suzuki	Zodiac
Hama	—N/a	Hama (9:08)	Kojima (10:21)	Suwama (11:22)	Suzuki (12:27)	Hama (7:30)
Kea	Hama (9:08)	—N/a	Kea (20:01)	Draw (30:00)	Kea (9:31)	Zodiac (14:38)
Kojima	Kojima (10:21)	Kea (20:01)	—N/a	Kojima (18:55)	Kojima (21:08)	Kojima (11:19)
Suwama	Suwama (11:22)	Draw (30:00)	Kojima (18:55)	—N/a	Suzuki (14:45)	Suwama (9:07)
Suzuki	Suzuki (12:27)	Kea (9:31)	Kojima (21:08)	Suzuki (14:45)	—N/a	Suzuki (13:43)
Zodiac	Hama (7:30)	Zodiac (14:38)	Kojima (11:19)	Suwama (9:07)	Suzuki (13:43)	—N/a

Semifinals
A1	Keiji Muto	CO
B2	Minoru Suzuki	15:13
B1	Satoshi Kojima	Pin
A2	Kaz Hayashi	16:30

Final
B2	Minoru Suzuki	Pin
A2	Kaz Hayashi	23:35

== 2010 ==
The 2010 version of the Champion Carnival took place between April 3 and April 11.

Final standings
Block A		Block B	
Minoru Suzuki	6	Masakatsu Funaki	7
Masayuki Kono	5	Suwama	5
Ryota Hama	4	Kiyoshi	4
Satoshi Kojima	4	René Duprée	2
Seiya Sanada	1	Taiyō Kea	2

Block A	Hama	Kojima	Kono	Sanada	Suzuki
Hama	—N/a	Kojima (12:47)	Kono (11:14)	Hama (11:01)	Hama (18:30)
Kojima	Kojima (12:47)	—N/a	Kono (27:57)	Kojima (13:54)	Suzuki (17:57)
Kono	Kono (11:14)	Kono (27:57)	—N/a	Draw (30:00)	Suzuki (14:40)
Sanada	Hama (11:01)	Kojima (13:54)	Draw (30:00)	—N/a	Suzuki (12:28)
Suzuki	Hama (18:30)	Suzuki (17:57)	Suzuki (14:40)	Suzuki (12:28)	—N/a
Block B	Duprée	Funaki	Kea	Kiyoshi	Suwama
Duprée	—N/a	Funaki (9:12)	Duprée (10:15)	Kiyoshi (11:34)	Suwama (11:18)
Funaki	Funaki (9:12)	—N/a	Funaki (14:40)	Funaki (15:47)	Draw (30:00)
Kea	Duprée (10:15)	Funaki (14:40)	—N/a	Kea (15:02)	Suwama (22:56)
Kiyoshi	Kiyoshi (11:34)	Funaki (15:47)	Kea (15:02)	—N/a	Kiyoshi (18:55)
Suwama	Suwama (11:18)	Draw (30:00)	Suwama (22:56)	Kiyoshi (18:55)	—N/a

Semifinals
A1	Minoru Suzuki	Pin
B2	Suwama	16:46
B1	Masakatsu Funaki	Sub
A2	Masayuki Kono	13:12

Final
A1	Minoru Suzuki	Sub
B1	Masakatsu Funaki	13:37

== 2011 ==
The 2011 version of the Champion Carnival tournament took place between April 8 and April 13. Kenso suffered an injury and was forced to drop out of the tournament after his first match, forfeiting the rest of his matches.

Final standings
Block A		Block B	
Yuji Nagata	8	Seiya Sanada	8
Masakatsu Funaki	6	Jun Akiyama	7
Kono	6	Minoru Suzuki	6
Suwama	6	Taiyō Kea	5
Takao Omori	4	Joe Doering	4
Ryota Hama	0	Kenso	0

Block A	Kono	Funaki	Hama	Nagata	Omori	Suwama
Kono	—N/a	Kono (12:44)	Kono (12:07)	Nagata (13:50)	Omori (12:19)	Kono (15:00)
Funaki	Kono (12:44)	—N/a	Funaki (8:43)	Funaki (13:07)	Funaki (14:01)	Suwama (18:57)
Hama	Kono (12:07)	Funaki (8:43)	—N/a	Nagata (11:18)	Omori (8:53)	Suwama (12:25)
Nagata	Nagata (13:50)	Funaki (13:07)	Nagata (11:18)	—N/a	Nagata (12:14)	Nagata (23:13)
Omori	Omori (12:19)	Funaki (14:01)	Omori (8:53)	Nagata (12:14)	—N/a	Suwama (16:56)
Suwama	Kono (15:00)	Suwama (18:57)	Suwama (12:25)	Nagata (23:13)	Suwama (16:56)	—N/a
Block B	Akiyama	Doering	Kea	Kenso	Sanada	Suzuki
Akiyama	—N/a	Akiyama (10:14)	Draw (30:00)	Akiyama (Forfeit)	Akiyama (22:05)	Suzuki (19:21)
Doering	Akiyama (10:14)	—N/a	Doering (8:44)	Doering (Forfeit)	Sanada (9:36)	Suzuki (16:09)
Kea	Draw (30:00)	Doering (8:44)	—N/a	Kea (Forfeit)	Sanada (18:37)	Kea (24:33)
Kenso	Akiyama (Forfeit)	Doering (Forfeit)	Kea (Forfeit)	—N/a	Sanada (Forfeit)	Suzuki (14:25)
Sanada	Akiyama (22:05)	Sanada (9:36)	Sanada (18:37)	Sanada (Forfeit)	—N/a	Sanada (16:06)
Suzuki	Suzuki (19:21)	Suzuki (16:09)	Kea (24:33)	Suzuki (14:25)	Sanada (16:06)	—N/a

Final
A1	Yuji Nagata	Pin
B1	Seiya Sanada	22:44

== 2012 ==
The 2012 version of the Champion Carnival took place between April 21 and May 7. Yutaka Yoshie suffered an injury and was forced to forfeit the rest of his matches. Takumi Soya was injured after his fifth match and was pulled out of the tournament as well, forfeiting his final match. Jun Akiyama, the reigning Triple Crown Heavyweight Champion, did not participate due to commitments with Pro Wrestling Noah.

Final standings
Block A		Block B	
Yuji Nagata	9	Akebono	10
Suwama	7	Taiyō Kea	9
Daisuke Sekimoto	6	Seiya Sanada	8
Takao Omori	6	Manabu Soya	6
Masayuki Kono	6	Yuji Okabayashi	5
Kenso	4	Takumi Soya	2
Ryota Hama	4	Yutaka Yoshie	2

Block A	Hama	Kenso	Kono	Nagata	Omori	Sekimoto	Suwama
Hama	—N/a	Kenso (11:11)	Hama (9:00)	Nagata (9:44)	Omori (9:43)	Hama (10:29)	Suwama (13:47)
Kenso	Kenso (11:11)	—N/a	Kono (13:11)	Nagata (15:37)	Kenso (19:36)	Sekimoto (13:22)	Suwama (17:17)
Kono	Hama (9:00)	Kono (13:11)	—N/a	Kono (13:40)	Omori (15:23)	Sekimoto (7:08)	Kono (20:01)
Nagata	Nagata (9:44)	Nagata (15:37)	Kono (13:40)	—N/a	Nagata (16:25)	Nagata (16:38)	Draw (30:00)
Omori	Omori (9:43)	Kenso (19:36)	Omori (15:23)	Nagata (16:25)	—N/a	Sekimoto (21:12)	Omori (19:37)
Sekimoto	Hama (10:29)	Sekimoto (13:22)	Sekimoto (7:08)	Nagata (16:38)	Sekimoto (21:12)	—N/a	Suwama (21:03)
Suwama	Suwama (13:47)	Suwama (17:17)	Kono (20:01)	Draw (30:00)	Omori (19:37)	Suwama (21:03)	—N/a
Block B	Akebono	Kea	Okabayashi	Sanada	M.Soya	T.Soya	Yoshie
Akebono	—N/a	Kea (7:07)	Akebono (5:50)	Akebono (9:31)	Akebono (8:41)	Akebono (Forfeit)	Akebono (Forfeit)
Kea	Kea (7:07)	—N/a	Draw (30:00)	Sanada (14:42)	Kea (14:04)	Kea (10:31)	Kea (Forfeit)
Okabayashi	Akebono (5:50)	Draw (30:00)	—N/a	Sanada (15:45)	Okabayashi (14:44)	Okabayashi (13:28)	Yoshie (10:48)
Sanada	Akebono (9:31)	Sanada (14:42)	Sanada (15:45)	—N/a	M.Soya (14:30)	Sanada (11:08)	Sanada (Forfeit)
M.Soya	Akebono (8:41)	Kea (14:04)	Okabayashi (14:44)	M.Soya (14:30)	—N/a	M.Soya (16:24)	M.Soya (Forfeit)
T.Soya	Akebono (Forfeit)	Kea (10:31)	Okabayashi (13:28)	Sanada (11:08)	M.Soya (16:24)	—N/a	T.Soya (Forfeit)
Yoshie	Akebono (Forfeit)	Kea (Forfeit)	Yoshie (10:48)	Sanada (Forfeit)	M.Soya (Forfeit)	T.Soya (Forfeit)	—N/a

Semifinals
A1	Yuji Nagata	Pin
B2	Taiyō Kea	11:51
B1	Akebono	Pin
A2	Suwama	8:18

Final
B2	Taiyō Kea	Pin
A2	Suwama	22:33

== 2013 ==
The 2013 version of the Champion Carnival tournament took place between April 18 to April 29.

Final standings
Block A		Block B	
Go Shiozaki	8	Jun Akiyama	8
Seiya Sanada	7	Kai	6
Suwama	5	Akebono	4
Masayuki Kono	4	Joe Doering	4
Takao Omori	4	Masakatsu Funaki	4
Ryota Hama	2	Kenso	4

Block A	Hama	Kono	Omori	Sanada	Shiozaki	Suwama
Hama	—N/a	Hama (8:04)	Omori (10:31)	Sanada (9:40)	Shiozaki (10:58)	Suwama (14:01)
Kono	Hama (8:04)	—N/a	Kono (13:44)	Sanada (10:22)	Shiozaki (14:00)	Kono (19:03)
Omori	Omori (10:31)	Kono (13:44)	—N/a	Sanada (13:22)	Shiozaki (19:02)	Omori (14:18)
Sanada	Sanada (9:40)	Sanada (10:22)	Sanada (13:22)	—N/a	Draw (30:00)	Suwama (17:28)
Shiozaki	Shiozaki (10:58)	Shiozaki (14:00)	Shiozaki (19:02)	Draw (30:00)	—N/a	Draw (30:00)
Suwama	Suwama (14:01)	Kono (19:03)	Omori (14:18)	Suwama (17:28)	Draw (30:00)	—N/a
Block B	Akebono	Akiyama	Doering	Funaki	Kai	Kenso
Akebono	—N/a	Akebono (5:47)	Doering (4:13)	Akebono (6:20)	Kai (8:44)	Kenso (9:30)
Akiyama	Akebono (5:47)	—N/a	Akiyama (7:13)	Akiyama (9:42)	Akiyama (16:54)	Akiyama (12:43)
Doering	Doering (4:13)	Akiyama (7:13)	—N/a	Doering (8:18)	Kai (4:55)	Kenso (11:01)
Funaki	Akebono (6:20)	Akiyama (9:42)	Doering (8:18)	—N/a	Funaki (12:45)	Funaki (13:17)
Kai	Kai (8:44)	Akiyama (16:54)	Kai (4:55)	Funaki (12:45)	—N/a	Kai (16:26)
Kenso	Kenso (9:30)	Akiyama (12:43)	Kenso (11:01)	Funaki (13:17)	Kai (16:26)	—N/a

Semifinals
A1	Go Shiozaki	Sub
B2	Kai	16:09
B1	Jun Akiyama	Pin
A2	Seiya Sanada	12:33

Final
B2	Kai	Pin
B1	Jun Akiyama	18:57

== 2014 ==
The 2014 version of the Champion Carnival tournament took place between April 13 and April 27. Akebono, reigning Triple Crown Heavyweight Champion, who was leading his block at the time, was forced to pull out of the tournament on April 22 after being hospitalized with poor health, forfeiting his last two matches (The title was eventually declared vacant on May 30, after the tournament was over.) On April 25, Go Shiozaki also withdrew from the tournament due to a broken thumb, and forfeited his final match against Jun Akiyama.

Final standings
Block A		Block B	
Suwama	8	Joe Doering	8
Takao Omori	8	Jun Akiyama	8
Akebono	6	Go Shiozaki	7
Kendo Kashin	4	Zeus	3
Kento Miyahara	2	Yutaka Yoshie	2
Osamu Nishimura	0	Kenso	2

Block A	Akebono	Kashin	Miyahara	Nishimura	Omori	Suwama
Akebono	—N/a	Akebono (5:25)	Akebono (9:19)	Akebono (8:18)	Omori (Forfeit)	Suwama (Forfeit)
Kashin	Akebono (5:25)	—N/a	Draw (10:01)	Kashin (5:21)	Omori (5:04)	Kashin (9:44)
Miyahara	Akebono (9:19)	Draw (10:01)	—N/a	Miyahara (8:47)	Omori (18:16)	Suwama (20:14)
Nishimura	Akebono (8:18)	Kashin (5:21)	Miyahara (8:47)	—N/a	Omori (12:08)	Suwama (21:18)
Omori	Omori (Forfeit)	Omori (5:04)	Omori (18:16)	Omori (12:08)	—N/a	Suwama (24:55)
Suwama	Suwama (Forfeit)	Kashin (9:44)	Suwama (20:14)	Suwama (21:18)	Suwama (24:55)	—N/a
Block B	Akiyama	Doering	Kenso	Shiozaki	Yoshie	Zeus
Akiyama	—N/a	Doering (14:26)	Akiyama (9:45)	Akiyama (Forfeit)	Akiyama (13:34)	Akiyama (15:27)
Doering	Doering (14:26)	—N/a	Doering (6:43)	Draw (30:00)	Doering (5:37)	Draw (30:00)
Kenso	Akiyama (9:45)	Doering (6:43)	—N/a	Shiozaki (13:15)	Kenso (11:23)	Zeus (8:02)
Shiozaki	Akiyama (Forfeit)	Draw (30:00)	Shiozaki (13:15)	—N/a	Shiozaki (17:46)	Shiozaki (21:17)
Yoshie	Akiyama (13:34)	Doering (5:37)	Kenso (11:23)	Shiozaki (17:46)	—N/a	Yoshie (14:35)
Zeus	Akiyama (15:27)	Draw (30:00)	Zeus (8:02)	Shiozaki (21:17)	Yoshie (14:35)	—N/a

Decision Matches
A1	Suwama	Pin
A2	Takao Omori	9:55
B1	Joe Doering	Pin
B2	Jun Akiyama	9:28

Final
A2	Takao Omori	Pin
B2	Jun Akiyama	17:14

== 2015 ==
The 2015 version of the Champion Carnival tournament took place between April 5 and April 25.

Final standings
Block A		Block B	
Go Shiozaki	7	Akebono	8
Suwama	7	Kento Miyahara	7
Takao Omori	6	Jun Akiyama	6
Kengo Mashimo	4	Joe Doering	6
Yutaka Yoshie	2	Zeus	3
The Bodyguard	2	Kenso	0

Block A	Bodyguard	Mashimo	Omori	Shiozaki	Suwama	Yoshie
Bodyguard	—N/a	Bodyguard (12:00)	Omori (14:25)	Shiozaki (19:22)	Suwama (11:17)	Yoshie (11:59)
Mashimo	Bodyguard (12:00)	—N/a	Mashimo (14:05)	Shiozaki (21:56)	No; Contest (9:15)	Mashimo (10:50)
Omori	Omori (14:25)	Mashimo (14:05)	—N/a	Omori (19:11)	Suwama (10:30)	Omori (15:42)
Shiozaki	Shiozaki (19:22)	Shiozaki (21:56)	Omori (19:11)	—N/a	Draw (30:00)	Shiozaki (14:33)
Suwama	Suwama (11:17)	No; Contest (9:15)	Suwama (10:30)	Draw (30:00)	—N/a	Suwama (13:39)
Yoshie	Yoshie (11:59)	Mashimo (10:50)	Omori (15:42)	Shiozaki (14:33)	Suwama (13:39)	—N/a
Block B	Akebono	Akiyama	Doering	Kenso	Miyahara	Zeus
Akebono	—N/a	Akebono (10:07)	Akebono (4:13)	Akebono (11:20)	Miyahara (10:34)	Akebono (6:58)
Akiyama	Akebono (10:07)	—N/a	Akiyama (7:52)	Akiyama (9:29)	Miyahara (10:02)	Akiyama (19:25)
Doering	Akebono (4:13)	Akiyama (7:52)	—N/a	Doering (10:41)	Doering (13:11)	Doering (12:14)
Kenso	Akebono (11:20)	Akiyama (9:29)	Doering (10:41)	—N/a	Miyahara (14:08)	Zeus (14:46)
Miyahara	Miyahara (10:34)	Miyahara (10:02)	Doering (13:11)	Miyahara (14:08)	—N/a	Draw (30:00)
Zeus	Akebono (6:58)	Akiyama (19:25)	Doering (12:14)	Zeus (14:46)	Draw (30:00)	—N/a

Block A Decision			Final
			A2	Suwama	16:25
A1	Go Shiozaki	5:35	B1	Akebono	Pin
A2	Suwama	Sub

== 2016 ==
The 2016 version of the Champion Carnival tournament took place between April 9 and April 24.

Final standings
Block A		Block B	
Daisuke Sekimoto	8	Zeus	10
Kento Miyahara	7	Ryoji Sai	8
Kengo Mashimo	7	Yutaka Yoshie	8
The Bodyguard	6	Takao Omori	6
Super Tiger	6	Atsushi Aoki	6
Jun Akiyama	6	Hideyoshi Kamitani	2
Naoya Nomura	2	Jake Lee	2

Block A	Akiyama	Bodyguard	Mashimo	Miyahara	Nomura	Sekimoto	Tiger
Akiyama	—N/a	Bodyguard (5:43)	Akiyama (17:19)	Akiyama (9:48)	Akiyama (11:23)	Sekimoto (17:53)	Tiger (7:52)
Bodyguard	Bodyguard (5:43)	—N/a	Mashimo (13:14)	Miyahara (8:59)	Nomura (9:54)	Bodyguard (13:35)	Bodyguard (9:12)
Mashimo	Akiyama (17:19)	Mashimo (13:14)	—N/a	Draw (30:00)	Mashimo (7:34)	Sekimoto (13:01)	Mashimo (9:22)
Miyahara	Akiyama (9:48)	Miyahara (8:59)	Draw (30:00)	—N/a	Miyahara (11:19)	Sekimoto (8:40)	Miyahara (9:42)
Nomura	Akiyama (11:23)	Nomura (9:54)	Mashimo (7:34)	Miyahara (11:19)	—N/a	Sekimoto (14:09)	Tiger (6:32)
Sekimoto	Sekimoto (17:53)	Bodyguard (13:35)	Sekimoto (13:01)	Sekimoto (8:40)	Sekimoto (14:09)	—N/a	Tiger (12:11)
Tiger	Tiger (7:52)	Bodyguard (9:12)	Mashimo (9:22)	Miyahara (9:42)	Tiger (6:32)	Tiger (12:11)	—N/a
Block B	Aoki	Kamitani	Lee	Omori	Sai	Yoshie	Zeus
Aoki	—N/a	Aoki (Forfeit)	Aoki (8:38)	Omori (9:10)	Aoki (7:43)	Yoshie (11:29)	Zeus (6:55)
Kamitani	Aoki (Forfeit)	—N/a	Kamitani (8:53)	Omori (Forfeit)	Sai (17:41)	Yoshie (Forfeit)	Zeus (12:46)
Lee	Aoki (8:38)	Kamitani (8:53)	—N/a	Lee (10:41)	Sai (8:16)	Yoshie (10:52)	Zeus (9:22)
Omori	Omori (9:10)	Omori (Forfeit)	Lee (10:41)	—N/a	Omori (13:20)	Yoshie (11:07)	Zeus (12:47)
Sai	Aoki (7:43)	Sai (17:41)	Sai (8:16)	Omori (13:20)	—N/a	Sai (9:43)	Sai (17:50)
Yoshie	Yoshie (11:29)	Yoshie (Forfeit)	Yoshie (10:52)	Yoshie (11:07)	Sai (9:43)	—N/a	Zeus (13:09)
Zeus	Zeus (6:55)	Zeus (12:46)	Zeus (9:22)	Zeus (12:47)	Sai (17:50)	Zeus (13:09)	—N/a

Final
A1	Daisuke Sekimoto	Pin
B1	Zeus	24:55

== 2017 ==
The 2017 version of the Champion Carnival tournament took place between April 16 and April 30.

Final standings
Block A		Block B	
Joe Doering	8	Shuji Ishikawa	9
Kento Miyahara	7	Kengo Mashimo	8
Daisuke Sekimoto	7	Suwama	8
Kai	6	The Bodyguard	6
Ryoji Sai	6	Daichi Hashimoto	4
Zeus	6	Naoya Nomura	4
Jake Lee	2	Takao Omori	3

Block A	Doering	Kai	Lee	Miyahara	Sai	Sekimoto	Zeus
Doering	—N/a	Doering (8:21)	Doering (8:17)	Miyahara (13:12)	Doering (6:22)	Doering (6:42)	Zeus (10:36)
Kai	Doering (8:21)	—N/a	Kai (15:04)	Miyahara (26:42)	Kai (9:55)	Sekimoto (5:53)	Kai (9:23)
Lee	Doering (8:17)	Kai (15:04)	—N/a	Miyahara (13:55)	Sai (6:14)	Sekimoto (10:51)	Lee (6:13)
Miyahara	Miyahara (13:12)	Miyahara (26:42)	Miyahara (13:55)	—N/a	Sai (13:55)	Draw (30:00)	Zeus (13:32)
Sai	Doering (6:22)	Kai (9:55)	Sai (6:14)	Sai (13:55)	—N/a	Sekimoto (16:08)	Sai (14:22)
Sekimoto	Doering (6:42)	Sekimoto (5:53)	Sekimoto (10:51)	Draw (30:00)	Sekimoto (16:08)	—N/a	Zeus (11:27)
Zeus	Zeus (10:36)	Kai (9:23)	Lee (6:13)	Zeus (13:32)	Sai (14:22)	Zeus (11:27)	—N/a
Block B	Bodyguard	Hashimoto	Ishikawa	Mashimo	Nomura	Omori	Suwama
Bodyguard	—N/a	Hashimoto (5:22)	Ishikawa (5:56)	Bodyguard (7:48)	Nomura (8:21)	Bodyguard (9:35)	Bodyguard (5:42)
Hashimoto	Hashimoto (5:22)	—N/a	Ishikawa (6:28)	Mashimo (9:37)	Hashimoto (5:08)	Omori (12:49)	Suwama (6:14)
Ishikawa	Ishikawa (5:56)	Ishikawa (6:28)	—N/a	Draw (30:00)	Ishikawa (9:19)	Ishikawa (16:37)	Suwama (13:48)
Mashimo	Bodyguard (7:48)	Mashimo (9:37)	Draw (30:00)	—N/a	Mashimo (6:49)	Draw (30:00)	Mashimo (15:00)
Nomura	Nomura (8:21)	Hashimoto (5:08)	Ishikawa (9:19)	Mashimo (6:49)	—N/a	Nomura (0:48)	Suwama (10:04)
Omori	Bodyguard (9:35)	Omori (12:49)	Ishikawa (16:37)	Draw (30:00)	Nomura (0:48)	—N/a	Suwama (14:02)
Suwama	Bodyguard (5:42)	Suwama (6:14)	Suwama (13:48)	Mashimo (15:00)	Suwama (10:04)	Suwama (14:02)	—N/a

Final
A1	Joe Doering	Pin
B1	Shuji Ishikawa	15:13

== 2018 ==
The 2018 version of the Champion Carnival tournament took place between April 7 and April 30.

Final standings
Block A		Block B	
Kento Miyahara	10	Naomichi Marufuji	10
Yuji Hino	8	Zeus	8
Shuji Ishikawa	8	Suwama	8
Joe Doering	8	Jun Akiyama	8
Shingo Takagi	8	Yoshitatsu	6
Ryoji Sai	6	Kai	6
Naoya Nomura	4	Dylan James	6
The Bodyguard	4	Yutaka Yoshie	4

Block A	Bodyguard	Doering	Hino	Ishikawa	Miyahara	Nomura	Sai	Takagi
Bodyguard	—N/a	Doering (6:29)	Bodyguard (7:17)	Ishikawa (4:26)	Miyahara (Forfeit)	Nomura (9:09)	Bodyguard (11:43)	Takagi (9:09)
Doering	Doering (6:29)	—N/a	Hino (8:47)	Ishikawa (11:25)	Doering (12:47)	Nomura (4:28)	Doering (5:53)	Doering (9:48)
Hino	Bodyguard (7:17)	Hino (8:47)	—N/a	Hino (12:48)	Miyahara (19:32)	Hino (7:28)	Sai (9:54)	Hino (16:25)
Ishikawa	Ishikawa (4:26)	Ishikawa (11:25)	Hino (12:48)	—N/a	Miyahara (16:57)	Ishikawa (14:40)	Sai (17:32)	Ishikawa (18:37)
Miyahara	Miyahara (Forfeit)	Doering (12:47)	Miyahara (19:32)	Miyahara (16:57)	—N/a	Miyahara (17:44)	Miyahara (18:00)	Takagi (14:28)
Nomura	Nomura (9:09)	Nomura (4:28)	Hino (7:28)	Ishikawa (14:40)	Miyahara (17:44)	—N/a	Sai (14:56)	Takagi (10:41)
Sai	Bodyguard (11:43)	Doering (5:53)	Sai (9:54)	Sai (17:32)	Miyahara (18:00)	Sai (14:56)	—N/a	Takagi (11:07)
Takagi	Takagi (9:09)	Doering (9:48)	Hino (16:25)	Ishikawa (18:37)	Takagi (14:28)	Takagi (10:41)	Takagi (11:07)	—N/a
Block B	Akiyama	James	Kai	Marufuji	Suwama	Yoshie	Yoshitatsu	Zeus
Akiyama	—N/a	Akiyama (3:57)	Akiyama (15:05)	Marufuji (20:53)	Suwama (13:03)	Akiyama (11:12)	Akiyama (7:09)	Zeus (18:50)
James	Akiyama (3:57)	—N/a	Kai (6:37)	Marufuji (5:39)	James (7:15)	James (10:10)	Yoshitatsu (14:40)	James (4:12)
Kai	Akiyama (15:05)	Kai (6:37)	—N/a	Marufuji (15:54)	Suwama (13:29)	Kai (10:00)	Yoshitatsu (13:24)	Kai (13:57)
Marufuji	Marufuji (20:53)	Marufuji (5:39)	Marufuji (15:54)	—N/a	Suwama (19:03)	Marufuji (11:38)	Marufuji (12:29)	Zeus (17:33)
Suwama	Suwama (13:03)	James (7:15)	Suwama (13:29)	Suwama (19:03)	—N/a	Suwama (11:05)	Yoshitatsu (16:36)	Zeus (15:45)
Yoshie	Akiyama (11:12)	James (10:10)	Kai (10:00)	Marufuji (11:38)	Suwama (11:05)	—N/a	Yoshie (11:43)	Yoshie (13:32)
Yoshitatsu	Akiyama (7:09)	Yoshitatsu (14:40)	Yoshitatsu (13:24)	Marufuji (12:29)	Yoshitatsu (16:36)	Yoshie (11:43)	—N/a	Zeus (15:52)
Zeus	Zeus (18:50)	James (4:12)	Kai (13:57)	Zeus (17:33)	Zeus (15:45)	Yoshie (13:32)	Zeus (15:52)	—N/a

Final
A1	Kento Miyahara	Pin
B1	Naomichi Marufuji	24:50

== 2019 ==
The 2019 version of the Champion Carnival took place between April 4 and April 29. Eighteen wrestlers competed in this tournament with nine men in each block. Kengo Mashimo was originally scheduled to compete, but was forced to withdraw due to injury. Atsushi Aoki took his place.

Kento Miyahara, reigning Triple Crown Heavyweight Champion, won the tournament in his sixth consecutive appearance.

Final standings
Block A		Block B	
Kento Miyahara	10	Naoya Nomura	10
Dylan James	9	Jake Lee	10
Yuji Okabayashi	9	Suwama	8
Shuji Ishikawa	9	Joe Doering	8
Zeus	8	Takashi Yoshida	8
Atsushi Aoki	8	Yoshitatsu	8
Ryoji Sai	7	Daichi Hashimoto	8
Yuma Aoyagi	6	Joel Redman	6
Gianni Valletta	6	Sam Adonis	6

Block A	Aoki	Aoyagi	Ishikawa	James	Miyahara	Okabayashi	Sai	Valletta	Zeus
Aoki	—N/a	Aoki (10:00)	Ishikawa (7:58)	Aoki (9:07)	Miyahara (13:30)	Okabayashi (8:32)	Aoki (8:33)	Aoki (6:49)	Zeus (10:46)
Aoyagi	Aoki (10:00)	—N/a	Ishikawa (13:38)	James (4:58)	Miyahara (17:55)	Okabayashi (5:28)	Aoyagi (11:43)	Aoyagi (11:26)	Aoyagi (11:02)
Ishikawa	Ishikawa (7:58)	Ishikawa (13:38)	—N/a	James (15:20)	Ishikawa (19:16)	Okabayashi (22:36)	Draw (30:00)	Valletta (5:07)	Ishikawa (17:49)
James	Aoki (9:07)	James (4:58)	James (15:20)	—N/a	Miyahara (20:39)	Draw (30:00)	James (8:20)	James (10:30)	Zeus (16:56)
Miyahara	Miyahara (13:30)	Miyahara (17:55)	Ishikawa (19:16)	Miyahara (20:39)	—N/a	Miyahara (18:24)	Miyahara (22:52)	Valletta (14:02)	Zeus (17:04)
Okabayashi	Okabayashi (8:32)	Okabayashi (5:28)	Okabayashi (22:36)	Draw (30:00)	Miyahara (18:24)	—N/a	Sai (10:06)	Valletta (9:04)	Okabayashi (16:28)
Sai	Aoki (8:33)	Aoyagi (11:43)	Draw (30:00)	James (8:20)	Miyahara (22:52)	Sai (10:06)	—N/a	Sai (11:46)	Sai (22:30)
Valletta	Aoki (6:49)	Aoyagi (11:26)	Valletta (5:07)	James (10:30)	Valletta (14:02)	Valletta (9:04)	Sai (11:46)	—N/a	Zeus (4:34)
Zeus	Zeus (10:46)	Aoyagi (11:02)	Ishikawa (17:49)	Zeus (16:56)	Zeus (17:04)	Okabayashi (16:28)	Sai (22:30)	Zeus (4:34)	—N/a
Block B	Adonis	Doering	Hashimoto	Lee	Nomura	Redman	Suwama	Yoshida	Yoshitatsu
Adonis	—N/a	Adonis (4:41)	Adonis (8:03)	Lee (10:12)	Nomura (13:11)	Redman (8:51)	Adonis (12:20)	Yoshida (9:23)	Yoshitatsu (8:24)
Doering	Adonis (4:41)	—N/a	Doering (8:05)	Lee (9:03)	Doering (10:47)	Doering (8:32)	Suwama (9:14)	Doering (9:25)	Yoshitatsu (16:13)
Hashimoto	Adonis (8:03)	Doering (8:05)	—N/a	Hashimoto (10:28)	Hashimoto (12:57)	Hashimoto (8:00)	Suwama (22:01)	Yoshida (7:52)	Hashimoto (11:26)
Lee	Lee (10:12)	Lee (9:03)	Hashimoto (10:28)	—N/a	Nomura (12:14)	Lee (12:47)	Suwama (22:18)	Lee (14:06)	Lee (13:04)
Nomura	Nomura (13:11)	Doering (10:47)	Hashimoto (12:57)	Nomura (12:14)	—N/a	Redman (10:18)	Nomura (22:31)	Nomura (17:43)	Nomura (19:46)
Redman	Redman (8:51)	Doering (8:32)	Hashimoto (8:00)	Lee (12:47)	Redman (10:18)	—N/a	Redman (11:12)	Yoshida (8:36)	Yoshitatsu (10:44)
Suwama	Adonis (12:20)	Suwama (9:14)	Suwama (22:01)	Suwama (22:18)	Nomura (22:31)	Redman (11:12)	—N/a	Suwama (15:14)	Yoshitatsu (20:16)
Yoshida	Yoshida (9:23)	Doering (9:25)	Yoshida (7:52)	Lee (14:06)	Nomura (17:43)	Yoshida (8:36)	Suwama (15:14)	—N/a	Yoshida (10:39)
Yoshitatsu	Yoshitatsu (8:24)	Yoshitatsu (16:13)	Hashimoto (11:26)	Lee (13:04)	Nomura (19:46)	Yoshitatsu (10:44)	Yoshitatsu (20:16)	Yoshida (10:39)	—N/a

Block B Decision			Final
			A1	Kento Miyahara	Pin
B1	Naoya Nomura	Pin	B2	Jake Lee	27:23
B2	Jake Lee	12:25

== 2020 ==
The 2020 Champion Carnival was a ten-man, two-block round-robin tournament that took place from September 12 until October 5, postponed from its original dates of April as a result of the COVID-19 pandemic.

Final standings
Block A		Block B	
Zeus	8	Kento Miyahara	6
Jake Lee	6	Shuji Ishikawa	4
Jiro Kuroshio	2	Yuma Aoyagi	4
Suwama	2	Shotaro Ashino	4
Kuma Arashi	2	Yoshitatsu	2

Block A	Arashi	Kuroshio	Lee	Suwama	Zeus
Arashi	—N/a	Arashi (20:56)	Lee (7:32)	Suwama (3:54)	Zeus (8:34)
Kuroshio	Arashi (20:56)	—N/a	Lee (8:36)	Kuroshio (14:00)	Zeus (7:13)
Lee	Lee (7:32)	Lee (8:36)	—N/a	Lee (17:38)	Zeus (10:21)
Suwama	Suwama (3:54)	Kuroshio (14:00)	Lee (17:38)	—N/a	Zeus (5:16)
Zeus	Zeus (8:34)	Zeus (7:13)	Zeus (10:21)	Zeus (5:16)	—N/a
Block B	Aoyagi	Ashino	Ishikawa	Miyahara	Yoshitatsu
Aoyagi	—N/a	Aoyagi (10:21)	Ishikawa (8:01)	Miyahara (22:14)	Aoyagi (5:11)
Ashino	Aoyagi (10:21)	—N/a	Ashino (22:14)	Miyahara (18:28)	Ashino (10:13)
Ishikawa	Ishikawa (8:01)	Ashino (22:14)	—N/a	Miyahara (20:56)	Ishikawa (forfeit)
Miyahara	Miyahara (22:14)	Miyahara (18:28)	Miyahara (20:56)	—N/a	Yoshitatsu (21:52)
Yoshitatsu	Aoyagi (5:11)	Ashino (10:13)	Ishikawa (forfeit)	Yoshitatsu (21:52)	—N/a

Final
A1	Zeus	Pin
B1	Kento Miyahara	31:05

== 2021 ==
The 2021 edition of the Champion Carnival took place between April 9 and May 3, 2021. For the first time since 2001, the round-robin tournament was a single table, with ten participants. Shinjiro Otani forfeited his final two matches due to injury.

Standings
Jake Lee	12
Kento Miyahara	10
Yuma Aoyagi	10
Kohei Sato	10
Zeus	10
Shuji Ishikawa	10
Suwama	10
Shotaro Ashino	8
Shinjiro Otani	4
Koji Doi	2

	Aoyagi	Ashino	Doi	Ishikawa	Lee	Miyahara	Otani	Sato	Suwama	Zeus
Aoyagi	—N/a	Aoyagi (9:22)	Aoyagi (10:21)	Ishikawa (11:13)	Aoyagi (17:23)	Miyahara (26:59)	Otani (9:51)	Aoyagi (8:54)	Suwama (17:44)	Aoyagi (14:35)
Ashino	Aoyagi (9:22)	—N/a	Ashino (8:46)	Ashino (7:08)	Lee (3:44)	Ashino (12:11)	Ashino (11:08)	Sato (9:48)	Suwama (11:44)	Zeus (8:22)
Doi	Aoyagi (10:21)	Ashino (8:46)	—N/a	Ishikawa (9:09)	Lee (8:10)	Miyahara (9:20)	DCO (6:39)	Doi (4:52)	Suwama (6:58)	DCO (11:04)
Ishikawa	Ishikawa (11:13)	Ashino (7:08)	Ishikawa (9:09)	—N/a	Ishikawa (14:12)	Ishikawa (19:16)	Otani (10:49)	Sato (11:06)	Ishikawa (20:15)	Zeus (10:41)
Lee	Aoyagi (17:23)	Lee (3:44)	Lee (8:10)	Ishikawa (14:12)	—N/a	Lee (27:48)	Lee (10:07)	Lee (11:05)	Suwama (18:23)	Lee (15:50)
Miyahara	Miyahara (26:59)	Ashino (12:11)	Miyahara (9:20)	Ishikawa (19:16)	Lee (27:48)	—N/a	Miyahara (13:23)	Miyahara (12:00)	Miyahara (20:51)	Zeus (18:16)
Otani	Otani (9:51)	Ashino (11:08)	DCO (6:39)	Otani (10:49)	Lee (10:07)	Miyahara (13:23)	—N/a	Sato (Forfeit)	Suwama (15:49)	Zeus (Forfeit)
Sato	Aoyagi (8:54)	Sato (9:48)	Doi (4:52)	Sato (11:06)	Lee (11:05)	Miyahara (12:00)	Sato (Forfeit)	—N/a	Sato (10:49)	Sato (11:21)
Suwama	Suwama (17:44)	Suwama (11:44)	Suwama (6:58)	Ishikawa (20:15)	Suwama (18:23)	Miyahara (20:51)	Suwama (15:49)	Sato (10:49)	—N/a	Zeus (19:52)
Zeus	Aoyagi (14:35)	Zeus (8:22)	DCO (11:04)	Zeus (10:41)	Lee (15:50)	Zeus (18:16)	Zeus (Forfeit)	Sato (11:21)	Zeus (19:52)	—N/a

== 2022 ==
The 2022 edition of the Champion Carnival took place between April 9 and May 4, 2022. This edition saw the return of the two-block round robin format after its absence in the 2021 edition. There were twelve participants including Big Japan Pro-Wrestling's Takuya Nomura and Gleat's T-Hawk competing in this year's tournament as special guests.

Final standings
Block A		Block B	
Jake Lee	8	Yuma Aoyagi	7
Shuji Ishikawa	6	Kento Miyahara	6
Shotaro Ashino	6	Takuya Nomura	6
Shigehiro Irie	5	Suwama	5
T-Hawk	5	Yoshitatsu	4
Ryuki Honda	0	Kuma Arashi	2

Block A	Ashino	Honda	Irie	Ishikawa	Lee	T-Hawk
Ashino	—N/a	Ashino (9:40)	Ashino (13:39)	Ishikawa (12:36)	Ashino (6:29)	T-Hawk (12:05)
Honda	Ashino (9:40)	—N/a	Irie (10:08)	Ishikawa (10:23)	Lee (10:54)	T-Hawk (7:17)
Irie	Ashino (13:39)	Irie (10:08)	—N/a	Irie (11:33)	Lee (13:01)	Draw (30:00)
Ishikawa	Ishikawa (12:36)	Ishikawa (10:23)	Irie (11:33)	—N/a	Lee (22:43)	Ishikawa (9:43)
Lee	Ashino (6:29)	Lee (10:54)	Lee (13:01)	Lee (22:43)	—N/a	Lee (16:21)
T-Hawk	T-Hawk (12:05)	T-Hawk (7:17)	Draw (30:00)	Ishikawa (9:43)	Lee (16:21)	—N/a
Block B	Aoyagi	Arashi	Miyahara	Nomura	Suwama	Yoshitatsu
Aoyagi	—N/a	Aoyagi (9:52)	Draw (30:00)	Nomura (11:00)	Aoyagi (14:30)	Aoyagi (9:11)
Arashi	Aoyagi (9:52)	—N/a	Arashi (13:26)	Nomura (11:05)	Suwama (14:48)	Yoshitatsu (9:43)
Miyahara	Draw (30:00)	Arashi (13:26)	—N/a	Miyahara (16:03)	Draw (30:00)	Miyahara (13:39)
Nomura	Nomura (11:00)	Nomura (11:05)	Miyahara (16:03)	—N/a	Suwama (11:09)	Nomura (9:45)
Suwama	Aoyagi (14:30)	Suwama (14:48)	Draw (30:00)	Suwama (11:09)	—N/a	Yoshitatsu (6:54)
Yoshitatsu	Aoyagi (9:11)	Yoshitatsu (9:43)	Miyahara (13:39)	Nomura (9:45)	Yoshitatsu (6:54)	—N/a

Final
A1	Jake Lee	Pin
B1	Yuma Aoyagi	30:24

== 2023 ==
The 2023 edition of the Champion Carnival took place between April 8 and May 7, 2023, with sixteen wrestlers participating. Naoya Nomura was originally scheduled to compete, but pulled out due to injury. Takao Omori took his place in the tournament.

Final standings
Block A		Block B	
T-Hawk	10	Shotaro Ashino	10
Kento Miyahara	8	Rei Saito	8
Ryuki Honda	8	Shuji Ishikawa	8
Yuma Aoyagi	8	Suwama	8
Satoshi Kojima	8	Manabu Soya	8
Cyrus	6	Hokuto Omori	6
Jun Saito	6	Yuma Anzai	6
Yoshitatsu	2	Takao Omori	0

Block A	Aoyagi	Cyrus	Honda	Miyahara	Jun	T-Hawk	Yoshitatsu	Kojima
Aoyagi	—N/a	Cyrus (7:03)	Honda (10:21)	Aoyagi (18:22)	Jun (9:37)	Aoyagi (14:02)	Aoyagi (7:50)	Aoyagi (13:59)
Cyrus	Cyrus (7:03)	—N/a	Honda (4:43)	Miyahara (6:23)	Cyrus (2:58)	T-Hawk (3:23)	Cyrus (4:05)	Kojima (9:22)
Honda	Honda (10:21)	Honda (4:43)	—N/a	Miyahara (8:42)	Jun (7:30)	T-Hawk (7:06)	Honda (2:02)	Honda (9:11)
Miyahara	Aoyagi (18:22)	Miyahara (6:23)	Miyahara (8:42)	—N/a	Miyahara (9:10)	T-Hawk (16:45)	Miyahara (18:17)	Kojima (19:42)
Jun	Jun (9:37)	Cyrus (2:58)	Jun (7:30)	Miyahara (9:10)	—N/a	T-Hawk (6:42)	Jun (6:25)	Kojima (8:19)
T-Hawk	Aoyagi (14:02)	T-Hawk (3:23)	T-Hawk (7:06)	T-Hawk (16:45)	T-Hawk (6:42)	—N/a	Yoshitatsu (6:58)	T-Hawk (7:02)
Yoshitatsu	Aoyagi (7:50)	Cyrus (4:05)	Honda (2:02)	Miyahara (18:17)	Jun (6:25)	Yoshitatsu (6:58)	—N/a	Kojima (9:20)
Kojima	Aoyagi (13:59)	Kojima (9:22)	Honda (9:11)	Kojima (19:42)	Kojima (8:19)	T-Hawk (7:02)	Kojima (9:20)	—N/a
Block B	Anzai	Ashino	Ishikawa	Hokuto	Takao	Rei	Suwama	Soya
Anzai	—N/a	Anzai (10:29)	Ishikawa (7:24)	Hokuto (9:04)	Anzai (7:46)	Anzai (7:35)	Suwama (14:51)	Soya (8:41)
Ashino	Anzai (10:29)	—N/a	Ashino (15:01)	Ashino (7:12)	Ashino (4:42)	Ashino (5:59)	Ashino (13:29)	Soya (6:48)
Ishikawa	Ishikawa (7:24)	Ashino (15:01)	—N/a	Hokuto (8:56)	Ishikawa (5:35)	Rei (7:31)	Ishikawa (17:51)	Ishikawa (11:02)
Hokuto	Hokuto (9:04)	Ashino (7:12)	Hokuto (8:56)	—N/a	Hokuto (4:57)	Rei (6:51)	Suwama (6:12)	Soya (9:18)
Takao	Anzai (7:46)	Ashino (4:42)	Ishikawa (5:35)	Hokuto (4:57)	—N/a	Rei (1:31)	Suwama (3:01)	Soya (9:02)
Rei	Anzai (7:35)	Ashino (5:59)	Rei (7:31)	Rei (6:51)	Rei (1:31)	—N/a	DCO (10:20)	Rei (9:47)
Suwama	Suwama (14:51)	Ashino (13:29)	Ishikawa (17:51)	Suwama (6:12)	Suwama (3:01)	DCO (10:20)	—N/a	Suwama (15:13)
Soya	Soya (8:41)	Soya (6:48)	Ishikawa (11:02)	Soya (9:18)	Soya (9:02)	Rei (9:47)	Suwama (15:13)	—N/a

Final
A1	T-Hawk	Sub
B1	Shotaro Ashino	24:45

== 2024 ==
The 2024 edition of the Champion Carnival took place between April 18 and May 12, 2024, with sixteen wrestlers participating. Hideki Suzuki, Ren Ayabe, Hartley Jackson, Davey Boy Smith Jr. and Lord Crewe made their tournament debuts. This was also Crewe's AJPW debut.

Final standings
Block A		Block B	
Kento Miyahara	12	Jun Saito	10
Davey Boy Smith Jr.	10	Rei Saito	8
Yuma Aoyagi	8	Hideki Suzuki	8
Kuroshio Tokyo Japan	6	Yuma Anzai	8
Cyrus	6	Suwama	8
Shotaro Ashino	6	Lord Crewe	6
Hokuto Omori	4	Hartley Jackson	4
Ren Ayabe	4	Ryuki Honda	4

Block A	Aoyagi	Ashino	Ayabe	Cyrus	Kuroshio	Miyahara	Omori	Smith
Aoyagi	—N/a	Ashino (12:06)	Aoyagi (10:23)	Aoyagi (8:52)	Aoyagi (11:44)	Miyahara (20:15)	Omori (8:59)	Aoyagi (15:38)
Ashino	Ashino (12:06)	—N/a	Ashino (11:00)	Cyrus (7:57)	Kuroshio (9:10)	Miyahara (18:40)	Ashino (7:02)	Smith (13:05)
Ayabe	Aoyagi (10:23)	Ashino (11:00)	—N/a	Cyrus (9:21)	Ayabe (9:37)	Ayabe (12:17)	Omori (9:48)	Smith (11:29)
Cyrus	Aoyagi (8:52)	Cyrus (7:57)	Cyrus (9:21)	—N/a	Kuroshio (3:12)	Miyahara (12:43)	Cyrus (6:46)	Smith (10:20)
Kuroshio	Aoyagi (11:44)	Kuroshio (9:10)	Ayabe (9:37)	Kuroshio (3:12)	—N/a	Miyahara (16:22)	Kuroshio (7:46)	Smith (10:47)
Miyahara	Miyahara (20:15)	Miyahara (18:40)	Ayabe (12:17)	Miyahara (12:43)	Miyahara (16:22)	—N/a	Miyahara (16:38)	Miyahara (26:12)
Omori	Omori (8:59)	Ashino (7:02)	Omori (9:48)	Cyrus (6:46)	Kuroshio (7:46)	Miyahara (16:38)	—N/a	Smith (11:33)
Smith	Aoyagi (15:38)	Smith (13:05)	Smith (11:29)	Smith (10:20)	Smith (10:47)	Miyahara (26:12)	Smith (11:33)	—N/a
Block B	Anzai	Crewe	Honda	Jackson	Jun	Rei	Suwama	Suzuki
Anzai	—N/a	Anzai (7:31)	Honda (21:13)	Anzai (9:04)	Anzai (15:18)	Rei (20:57)	Anzai (19:09)	Suzuki (10:45)
Crewe	Anzai (7:31)	—N/a	Crewe (2:12)	Jackson (8:27)	Jun (5:37)	Crewe (6:57)	Suwama (3:21)	Crewe (5:55)
Honda	Honda (21:13)	Crewe (2:12)	—N/a	Jackson (10:12)	Jun (14:07)	Honda (13:01)	Suwama (11:42)	Suzuki (5:47)
Jackson	Anzai (9:04)	Jackson (8:27)	Jackson (10:12)	—N/a	Jun (7:47)	Rei (9:41)	Suwama (6:52)	Suzuki (4:30)
Jun	Anzai (15:18)	Jun (5:37)	Jun (14:07)	Jun (7:47)	—N/a	Rei (23:50)	Jun (14:18)	Jun (13:08)
Rei	Rei (20:57)	Crewe (6:57)	Honda (13:01)	Rei (9:41)	Rei (23:50)	—N/a	Suwama (8:31)	Rei (6:54)
Suwama	Anzai (19:09)	Suwama (3:21)	Suwama (11:42)	Suwama (6:52)	Jun (14:18)	Suwama (8:31)	—N/a	Suzuki (15:07)
Suzuki	Suzuki (10:45)	Crewe (5:55)	Suzuki (5:47)	Suzuki (4:30)	Jun (13:08)	Rei (6:54)	Suzuki (15:07)	—N/a

Final
A1	Kento Miyahara	Pin
B1	Jun Saito	27:15

== 2025 ==
The 2025 edition of the Champion Carnival took place between April 9 and May 18, 2025, with eighteen wrestlers participating. Xyon, Aigle Blanc, Mike D Vecchio, and Madoka Kikuta made their tournament debuts. Cyrus was originally meant to take part in the tournament, but due to health issues, Takashi Yoshida was inserted in his place.

Final standings
Block A		Block B	
Hideki Suzuki	12	Ryuki Honda	10
Kento Miyahara	12	Rei Saito	10
Davey Boy Smith Jr.	10	Madoka Kikuta	8
Jun Saito	10	Yuma Anzai	8
Kumaarashi	8	Yuma Aoyagi	8
Kengo Mashimo	8	Ren Ayabe	8
Shotaro Ashino	6	Mike D Vecchio	8
Xyon	4	Aigle Blanc	6
Takashi Yoshida	2	Hokuto Omori	6

Block A	Ashino	Jun	Kumaarashi	Mashimo	Miyahara	Smith	Suzuki	Xyon	Yoshida
Ashino	—N/a	Jun (17:24)	Kumaarashi (13:46)	Mashimo (9:21)	Miyahara (17:10)	Ashino (13:26)	Suzuki (7:51)	Ashino (7:49)	Ashino (13:15)
Jun	Jun (17:24)	—N/a	Jun (9:36)	Jun (16:47)	Miyahara (20:36)	Smith (17:56)	Suzuki (15:16)	Jun (17:21)	Jun (15:24)
Kumaarashi	Kumaarashi (13:46)	Jun (9:36)	—N/a	Kumaarashi (10:21)	Miyahara (17:03)	Smith (9:43)	Kumaarashi (5:51)	Xyon (8:54)	Kumaarashi (14:26)
Mashimo	Mashimo (9:21)	Jun (16:47)	Kumaarashi (10:21)	—N/a	Miyahara (20:34)	Mashimo (13:30)	Mashimo (12:43)	Mashimo (8:31)	Yoshida (11:59)
Miyahara	Miyahara (17:10)	Miyahara (20:36)	Miyahara (17:03)	Miyahara (20:34)	—N/a	Smith (18:44)	Suzuki (21:13)	Miyahara (11:32)	Miyahara (14:19)
Smith	Ashino (13:26)	Smith (17:56)	Smith (9:43)	Mashimo (13:30)	Smith (18:44)	—N/a	Suzuki (12:48)	Smith (12:17)	Smith (12:47)
Suzuki	Suzuki (7:51)	Suzuki (15:16)	Kumaarashi (5:51)	Mashimo (12:43)	Suzuki (21:13)	Suzuki (12:48)	—N/a	Suzuki (8:30)	Suzuki (8:58)
Xyon	Ashino (7:49)	Jun (17:21)	Xyon (8:54)	Mashimo (8:31)	Miyahara (11:32)	Smith (12:17)	Suzuki (8:30)	—N/a	Xyon (10:24)
Yoshida	Ashino (13:15)	Jun (15:24)	Kumaarashi (14:26)	Yoshida (11:59)	Miyahara (14:19)	Smith (12:47)	Suzuki (8:58)	Xyon (10:24)	—N/a
Block B	Anzai	Aoyagi	Ayabe	Blanc	Honda	Kikuta	Omori	Rei	Vecchio
Anzai	—N/a	Aoyagi (17:48)	Anzai (17:51)	Anzai (7:59)	Honda (22:51)	Kikuta (15:32)	Anzai (1:39)	Rei (18:00)	Anzai (10:41)
Aoyagi	Aoyagi (17:48)	—N/a	Aoyagi (15:48)	Aoyagi (18:35)	Honda (19:04)	Kikuta (12:57)	Omori (11:47)	Rei (13:53)	Aoyagi (8:27)
Ayabe	Anzai (17:51)	Aoyagi (15:48)	—N/a	Blanc (12:16)	Ayabe (16:52)	Ayabe (12:44)	Ayabe (10:33)	Ayabe (13:30)	Vecchio (10:26)
Blanc	Anzai (7:59)	Aoyagi (18:35)	Blanc (12:16)	—N/a	Blanc (11:31)	Kikuta (10:49)	Blanc (8:58)	Rei (9:25)	Vecchio (10:36)
Honda	Honda (22:51)	Honda (19:04)	Ayabe (16:52)	Blanc (11:31)	—N/a	Honda (14:24)	Omori (8:36)	Honda (9:04)	Honda (12:22)
Kikuta	Kikuta (15:32)	Kikuta (12:57)	Ayabe (12:44)	Kikuta (10:49)	Honda (14:24)	—N/a	Kikuta (9:43)	Rei (16:55)	Vecchio (10:46)
Omori	Anzai (1:39)	Omori (11:47)	Ayabe (10:33)	Blanc (8:58)	Omori (8:36)	Kikuta (9:43)	—N/a	Rei (8:59)	Omori (9:15)
Rei	Rei (18:00)	Rei (13:53)	Ayabe (13:30)	Rei (9:25)	Honda (9:04)	Rei (16:55)	Rei (8:59)	—N/a	Vecchio (11:33)
Vecchio	Anzai (10:41)	Aoyagi (8:27)	Vecchio (10:26)	Vecchio (10:36)	Honda (12:22)	Vecchio (10:46)	Omori (9:15)	Vecchio (11:33)	—N/a

Semi-finals
A1	Hideki Suzuki	KO
B2	Rei Saito	1:49
B1	Ryuki Honda	Pin
A2	Kento Miyahara	9:53

Final
B2	Rei Saito	24:22
A2	Kento Miyahara	Pin

== 2026 ==
The 2026 edition of the Champion Carnival took place between April 12 and May 17, 2026, with sixteen wrestlers participating. Foreigners Talos and Oddyssey made their tournament debuts. On the second night of the tournament, Jun Saito suffered a right eye injury during his match against Yuma Aoyagi, forcing him to forfeit the rest of his tournament matches. On the eight night, Yuma Anzai injured his right leg in his match against Kuma Arashi, forcing him to forfeit his final tournament match against Rei Saito.

Final standings
Block A		Block B	
Go Shiozaki	8	Hideki Suzuki	9
Rei Saito	8	Madoka Kikuta	8
Kengo Mashimo	8	Ren Ayabe	8
Talos	8	Ryuki Honda	8
Kento Miyahara	7	Daisuke Sekimoto	8
Oddyssey	6	Yuma Aoyagi	7
Kuma Arashi	6	Xyon	6
Yuma Anzai	5	Jun Saito	0

Block A	Rei	Miyahara	Shiozaki	Anzai	Arashi	Mashimo	Talos	Oddyssey
Rei	—N/a	Miyahara (16:57)	Rei (12:31)	Rei (forfeit)	Rei (8:22)	Mashimo (9:25)	Rei (9:47)	Odyssey (11:02)
Miyahara	Miyahara (16:57)	—N/a	Shiozaki (25:46)	Draw (30:00)	Miyahara (18:45)	Mashimo (15:51)	Talos (12:22)	Miyahara (10:04)
Shiozaki	Rei (12:31)	Shiozaki (25:46)	—N/a	Shiozaki (23:49)	Arashi (12:07)	Shiozaki (19:23)	Talos (7:42)	Shiozaki (9:48)
Anzai	Rei (forfeit)	Draw (30:00)	Shiozaki (23:49)	—N/a	Arashi (1:54)	Anzai (18:13)	Anzai (12:10)	Oddyssey (12:20)
Arashi	Rei (8:22)	Miyahara (18:45)	Arashi (12:07)	Arashi (1:54)	—N/a	Arashi (10:37)	Talos (7:46)	Oddyssey (9:18)
Mashimo	Mashimo (9:25)	Mashimo (15:51)	Shiozaki (19:23)	Anzai (18:13)	Arashi (10:37)	—N/a	Mashimo (7:31)	Mashimo (9:01)
Talos	Rei (9:47)	Talos (12:22)	Talos (7:42)	Anzai (12:10)	Talos (7:46)	Mashimo (7:31)	—N/a	Talos (12:18)
Oddyssey	Odyssey (11:02)	Miyahara (10:04)	Shiozaki (9:48)	Oddyssey (12:20)	Oddyssey (9:18)	Mashimo (9:01)	Talos (12:18)	—N/a
Block B	Suzuki	Ayabe	Jun	Honda	Sekimoto	Kikuta	Xyon	Aoyagi
Suzuki	—N/a	Suzuki (13:32)	Suzuki (forfeit)	Suzuki (13:49)	Sekimoto (10:42)	Suzuki (13:48)	Xyon (5:55)	Draw (4:48)
Ayabe	Suzuki (13:32)	—N/a	Ayabe (20:12)	Ayabe (16:07)	Ayabe (12:28)	Kikuta (18:43)	Ayabe (7:19)	Aoyagi (20:48)
Jun	Suzuki (forfeit)	Ayabe (20:12)	—N/a	Honda (forfeit)	Sekimoto (forfeit)	Kikuta (forfeit)	Xyon (forfeit)	Aoyagi (14:26)
Honda	Suzuki (13:49)	Ayabe (16:07)	Honda (forfeit)	—N/a	Honda (14:11)	Kikuta (17:51)	Honda (12:18)	Honda (14:38)
Sekimoto	Sekimoto (10:42)	Ayabe (12:28)	Sekimoto (forfeit)	Honda (14:11)	—N/a	Kikuta (17:38)	Sekimoto (10:09)	Sekimoto (15:14)
Kikuta	Suzuki (13:48)	Kikuta (18:43)	Kikuta (forfeit)	Kikuta (17:51)	Kikuta (17:38)	—N/a	DCO (10:05)	Aoyagi (19:29)
Xyon	Xyon (5:55)	Ayabe (7:19)	Xyon (forfeit)	Honda (12:18)	Sekimoto (10:09)	DCO (10:05)	—N/a	Xyon (12:03)
Aoyagi	Draw (4:48)	Aoyagi (20:48)	Aoyagi (14:26)	Honda (14:38)	Sekimoto (15:14)	Aoyagi (19:29)	Xyon (12:03)	—N/a

Block A Decision
A1	Go Shiozaki	8:20
A4	Talos	Pin
A2	Rei Saito	4:50
A3	Kengo Mashimo	Pin

Semi-finals
A1	Go Shiozaki	18:18
B2	Madoka Kikuta	Pin
B1	Hideki Suzuki	1:09
A2	Rei Saito	Pin

Final
A1	Go Shiozaki	Pin
B1	Hideki Suzuki	24:15

== See also ==
- All Japan Pro Wrestling
- G1 Climax
- N-1 Victory
- Fire Festival
- Ikkitousen Strong Climb
- D-Oh Grand Prix
- King of Gate
