= Xceed (professional wrestling) =

Professional wrestling stable

Stable
- Members: Atsushi Aoki; Go Shiozaki; Kotaro Suzuki; Kenso; Kento Miyahara; Yohei Nakajima
- Name: Xceed
- Debut: November 18, 2013
- Disbanded: November 16, 2015

Xceed was a professional wrestling stable in All Japan Pro Wrestling and led by Go Shiozaki. The name "Xceed" means "surpass", "transcend", as well as a play on the original word "Exceed".

== History ==
=== 2013 ===
On October 23, Go Shiozaki quit the Burning stable and decided to go on his own. On November 18, Shiozaki announced the formation of his new stable: Xceed and that Kenso was the first member. The group made their in-ring debut on the first day of the Royal Road Renaissancetour on November 21 with Shiozaki and Kenso teaming up against D-Lo Brown and Bambi Killer. The debut would end in disaster when the team lost after Kenso refused to tag in and betrayed Shiozaki by announcing he was with Brown and Bambi Killer all along. Following the match, Kento Miyahara, Kotaro Suzuki, and Atsushi Aoki came out to save Shiozaki. Following the event, Miyahara, Suzuki, and Aoki officially joined Xceed. For the remainder of the tour, Xceed would feud with Kenso's new stable, now called Dark Kingdom, with the two stable exchanging wins. From November to December, Xceed would enter the 2013 World's Strongest Tag Determination League with Shiozaki and Miyahara forming one team while Suzuki and Aoki would form another. Ultimately, Suzuki and Aoki finished last place with 2 points by only defeating Jun Akiyama and Takao Omori. Shiozaki and Miyahara would fare better by making it to the finals but lost to the World Tag Team Champions Suwama and Joe Doering

=== 2014 ===
On January 2, Miyahara officially joined All Japan and defeated Hikaru Sato. At the same show, Shiozaki would gain revenge by defeating Kenso in a one-on-one match. Aoki would challenge Ultimo Dragon for the World Junior Heavyweight Championship but came up short. In the main event, Suzuki and Miyahara entered the New Year's Battle Royal but lost to Takao Omori. On January 26, Suzuki and Aoki lost the All Asia Tag Team Championship to former Burning teammates Jun Akiyama and Yoshinobu Kanemaru. In February, Shiozaki began pursuing the Triple Crown Heavyweight Championship while Suzuki and Aoki entered the 2014 Jr. Battle of Glory tournament. On February 5, Shiozaki scored a pinfall over triple crown champion Akebono in a tag team match. On the same show, Aoki announced his departure from Xceed and decided to go on his own. On February 16, Suzuki won the Jr. Battle of Glory by defeating Masaaki Mochizuki in the finals and earned a junior heavyweight title shot. On February 23 at Okinawa Impact Vol. 1, Miyahara defeated Takao Omori but the stable were unable to win any titles as Suzuki failed to win the junior heavyweight title against Ultimo Dragon while Shiozaki was unable to wrestle the triple crown from Akebono. In March, Miyahara challenged Akebono for the Triple Crown and received a shot on March 18, but he too, fell to Akebono.

In April, Shiozaki and Miyahara entered the 2014 Champion Carnival but neither won. Miyahara would place 5th in Block A with 2 points and his only win being over Osamu Nishimura. Shiozaki finished in 3rd place in Block B with 7 points but was unable to finish the tournament when he suffered a broken thumb and had to withdraw from the final day. In May, Xceed got two title shots. On May 15, Suzuki and Miyahara challenged Team Dream Future for the All Asia Tag Team Titles but lost. The following day, Suzuki bounced back by defeating Sushi for the Gaora TV Championship. In June, the group had a quiet month with the only highlights being Suzuki's title defenses. During the June Dynamite Tour, Suzuki would make two successful title defenses of his TV Championship. He defeated Sushi in a rematch on June 15 and Menso-re Oyaji on June 30. Oyaji joined Xceed under his real name Yohei Nakajima on July 27. On September 28, Shiozaki defeated Suwama in the finals to win the 2014 Ōdō Tournament and earn another shot at the Triple Crown Heavyweight Championship.

=== 2015 ===
On January 3, 2015, Shiozaki defeated Joe Doering to win the Triple Crown Heavyweight Championship for the first time. Earlier in the event, Miyahara and Suzuki lost the All Asia Tag Team Championship to Dark Kingdom representatives Mitsuya Nagai and Takeshi Minamino. On March 27, Kotaro Suzuki defeated Atsushi Aoki to win the World Junior Heavyweight Championship. On May 6, Shiozaki and Miyahara defeated Akebono and Yutaka Yoshie to win the World Tag Team Championship. On May 21, Shiozaki lost the Triple Crown Heavyweight Championship to Akebono in his third defense. On August 16, Nakajima defeated Billyken Kid to win the vacant Gaora TV Championship. On September 28, Shiozaki announced his resignation from AJPW, which led to him and Miyahara vacating the World Tag Team Championship. He wrestled his final AJPW match on October 4. On November 16, Xceed was disbanded, when Kotaro Suzuki also announced his departure from AJPW.

== Championships and accomplishments ==
- All Japan Pro Wrestling
  - All Asia Tag Team Championship (2 times) – Suzuki and Aoki (1), Suzuki and Miyahara (1)
  - Gaora TV Championship (2 times) – Suzuki (1) and Nakajima (1)
  - Triple Crown Heavyweight Championship (1 time) – Shiozaki
  - World Junior Heavyweight Championship (1 time) – Suzuki
  - World Tag Team Championship (1 time) – Shiozaki and Miyahara
  - Jr. Battle of Glory (2014, 2015) – Suzuki
  - Ōdō Tournament (2014) – Shiozaki

== See also ==
- All Japan Pro Wrestling
- Puroresu
