= Dark Kingdom (professional wrestling) =

Professional wrestling stable

Stable
- Name(s): Dark Kingdom; DK
- Former members: Kenso; Mitsuya Nagai; Takeshi Minamino; Kenichiro Arai; Bear Fukuda; Bambi Killer; Masahiro Chono; D-Lo Brown; Kengo Mashimo
- Debut: November 21, 2013
- Disbanded: September 25, 2016

Dark Kingdom (DK) was a stable that appeared in All Japan Pro Wrestling and led by Kenso.

== History ==
=== 2013 ===
On November 18, 2013, Go Shiozaki announced forming a new group in Xceed with Kenso being the first member to the group. On November 21 at the first show of the 2013 Oudou Renaissance tour, Kenso teamed with Shiozaki in a losing effort against D-Lo Brown and Bambi Killer after Kenso betrayed Shiozaki and refused to tag in. Afterwards, Kenso announced he'd been with Brown and Bambi all along with the three eventually being chased out of the ring by new Xceed members Kotaro Suzuki, Kento Miyahara, and Atsushi Aoki. In a press conference, Kenso claimed that Brown and Bambi Killer were his family, they were going for the belts, and he was targeting the Triple Crown Heavyweight Championship for himself. For the remainder of the November tour, Kenso and his group would feud with Xceed with both groups trading wins. On November 24, Masahiro Chono joined the group for one match to defeat Shiozaki, Miyahara, and Aoki. On November 27, the group hit a setback when Bambi Killer suffered a neck injury during his match with Joe Doering which forced him out for several months. The following day, Kenso officially announced his stable to be "Dark Kingdom". It was also announced that Kenso would replace Bambi Killer and team with Brown in the World's Strongest Tag Determination League. At the 2013 World Strongest Tag League, Kenso and Brown teamed up to represent Dark Kingdom where they finished 7th place with 2 points. They're only win was against All Asia Tag Team Champions Kotaro Suzuki and Atsushi Aoki. Aside from that, the team had a chaotic run losing a few of their tournament matches by disqualification and went a double countout with Takao Omori and Jun Akiyama. Following this tour, Brown was no longer booked by All Japan which left Kenso as the only member left in Dark Kingdom.

=== 2014 ===
Kenso began 2014 on a bad note as he lost to Go Shiozaki on January 2. The following day, Kenso teamed with the returning Mitsuya Nagai and rebounded with a win over Osamu Nishimura and Ryuji Hijikata. Dark Kingdom began to rebuild with this match as Kenso formed an alliance with Nagai, who began appearing regularly in All Japan. During the 2014 Excite Series, the stable began expanding again with Kenso announcing Nagai as an official member on February 13. At the same time, Kenso began courting Atsushi Aoki after Aoki left Xceed but was not successful. In March, Dark Kingdom formed new alliances with Takeshi Minamino and Kengo Mashimo. On March 16, Kenso and Mashimo defeated Suwama and Hikaru Sato, while Minamino came in on March 18 when he teamed with Nagai in a winning effort over Yutaka Yoshie and Shigehiro Irie. On March 29, Nagai and Minamino challenged Jun Akiyama and Yoshinobu Kanemaru for the All Asia Tag Team Championship but lost. Despite the loss, Kenso offered Minamino an invitation to Dark Kingdom after the match. April would be a huge month for the group. Kenso would enter the 2014 Champion Carnival where he placed 5th place in Block B with 2 points with his only won coming from Yutaka Yoshie. On April 23, the group would expand greatly when after the win over Yoshie, Kenso announced Nagai, Minamino, Mashimo, Bear Fukuda, and Kenichiro Arai as new members with Kenso announcing that this is the "true beginning" of DK. Dark Kingdom wrestled throughout the Super Power Series tour of May. On May 29, Kenso and Mashimo challenged Suwama and Joe Doering for the World Tag Team Championship but came up short. On the June Dynamite tour, Bambi Killer made his return to All Japan and rejoined DK while Nagai and Minamino began campaigning for an All Asia Tag Team Title shot while Kenso and Nagai campaigned for a World Tag Team Title shot. On August 30, Kengo Mashimo turned on Kenso, costing DK their match for the KO-D 6-Man Tag Team Championship. On December 14, Kenso brought Dark Kingdom its first title, when he defeated Kotaro Suzuki for the Gaora TV Championship.

=== 2015 ===
Dark Kingdom added another title on January 3, 2015, when Nagai and Minamino defeated Kento Miyahara and Kotaro Suzuki to win the All Asia Tag Team Championship. They lost the title to Último Dragón and Yoshinobu Kanemaru on March 22. On June 4, Kenso lost the Gaora TV Championship to Sushi. On July 31, it was announced that KENSO would begin freelancing following the expiration of his AJPW contract and he left Dark Kingdom with Nagai and Minamino remaining the only members of the stable due to Fukuda and Arai leaving DK to continue their careers outside of AJPW.

=== 2016 ===
In 2016 Minamino participated in the Jr. Battle of Glory but he finished his block with all of his matches going to double count outs and he failed to reach the finals. On July 14, he defeated Yohei Nakajima for the Gaora TV Championship but he lost back to Nakajima on August 11. On September 25, 2016, Nagai and Minamino decided to disband Dark Kingdom in order to found their own stable named Dark Nightmare with Tatsuhito Takaiwa, Black Tiger V and Black Tiger VII.

== Championships and accomplishments ==
- All Japan Pro Wrestling
  - All Asia Tag Team Championship (1 time) - Nagai and Minamino
  - Gaora TV Championship (1 time) - Kenso
