= Kento Miyahara =

Japanese professional wrestler

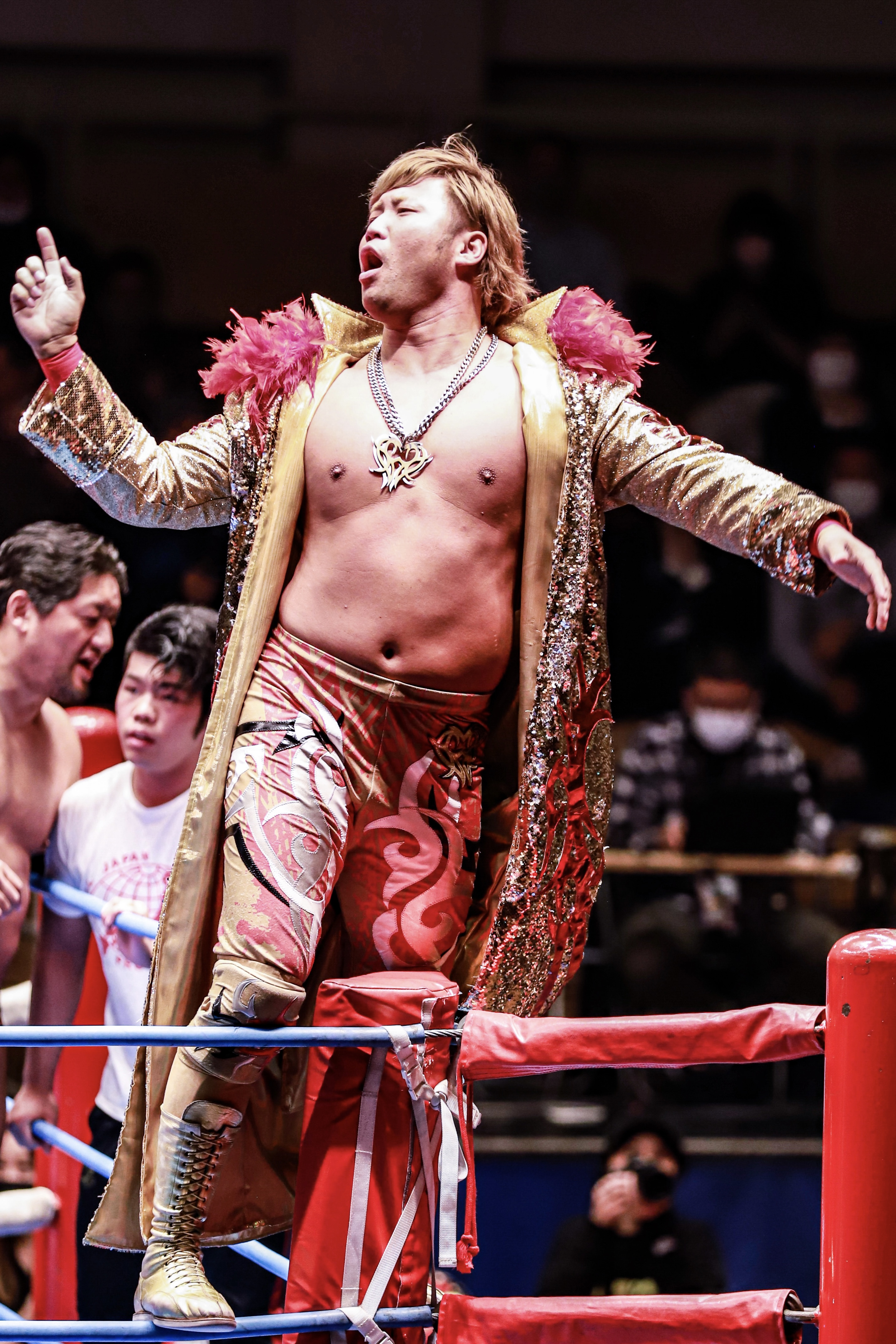
- Miyahara in March 2023

Personal information
- Born: February 27, 1989 (age 37) Fukuoka, Fukuoka, Japan

Professional wrestling career
- Ring name(s): Kento Miyahara; Miyahara
- Billed height: 1.86 m (6 ft 1 in)
- Billed weight: 105 kg (231 lb)
- Trained by: Katsuhiko Nakajima; Kensuke Sasaki; Masa Saito
- Debut: February 11, 2008

Kento Miyahara (宮原 健斗, Miyahara Kento; born February 27, 1989) is a Japanese professional wrestler, signed to All Japan Pro Wrestling (AJPW), where he is the current seven-time Triple Crown Heavyweight Champion. He was trained by Kensuke Sasaki and started his career in his Kensuke Office promotion in February 2008, before joining AJPW in January 2014. He won his first title, the All Asia Tag Team Championship, in August 2014. He has also held AJPW's World Tag Team Championship. In February 2016, Miyahara won AJPW's top title, the Triple Crown Heavyweight Championship, becoming the youngest winner of the title in the process until March 20, 2024, when Yuma Anzai break his record at 24 years. He has since won the title five more times and is tied with Toshiaki Kawada for the most title defenses with ten. Currently regarded as the ace of the promotion, he is known for his charismatic and energetic demeanor in his matches and segments, with him adding brash and anti-authority rhetoric within his later years as the "Best of the Best".

== Professional wrestling career ==
=== Kensuke Office / Diamond Ring (2008–2013) ===
With a background in judo, Miyahara made his professional wrestling debut on February 11, 2008, at a Kensuke Office event, losing to All Japan Pro Wrestling (AJPW) representative Seiya Sanada. Through Kensuke Office's relationship with Pro Wrestling Noah, Miyahara also began making appearances for Noah, taking part in both the NTV G+ Cup Junior Heavyweight Tag League and Mauritius Cup later in the year. Miyahara continued working regularly for both Kensuke Office and Pro Wrestling Noah for the next few years, being pegged as the "next Kensuke Sasaki". On May 17, 2012, Miyahara made his Mexican debut for International Wrestling Revolution Group (IWRG), when he represented a team of Japanese wrestlers in the 2012 Copa Higher Power. In February 2013, Miyahara entered a storyline, where he turned on Sasaki and the former Kensuke Office, now known as Diamond Ring, by joining the villainous Voodoo Murders stable. Backed by his new partners, he then started a storyline rivalry with the remaining Diamond Ring representatives such as Katsuhiko Nakajima and Satoshi Kajiwara.

=== All Japan Pro Wrestling (2013–present) ===
==== Xceed (2013–2015) ====
In August 2013, it was announced that Miyahara would be taking part in AJPW's 2013 Ōdō Tournament the following month. On September 9, Miyahara announced he was officially breaking off his affiliation with Diamond Ring and becoming a freelancer. On September 14, Miyahara was eliminated from the Ōdō Tournament in his first round match by Suwama. In AJPW, Miyahara formed a new partnership with Go Shiozaki due to the similarities between the two in both size and age. On November 14, Voodoo Murders held a press conference to announce that Miyahara was also leaving the stable to fully concentrate on working for AJPW. On November 21, Miyahara and Shiozaki came together with Atsushi Aoki and Kotaro Suzuki to form the new Xceed stable. The following month, Miyahara and Shiozaki made it to the finals of the 2013 World's Strongest Tag Determination League, but were defeated there by Evolution (Joe Doering and Suwama). In January 2014, Miyahara signed a contract to officially become affiliated with AJPW. On March 18, Miyahara received his first shot at AJPW's top title, the Triple Crown Heavyweight Championship, but was defeated by the defending champion, Akebono. On August 16, Miyahara won his first professional wrestling title, when he and Kotaro Suzuki defeated Keisuke Ishii and Shigehiro Irie to win the All Asia Tag Team Championship. In December, Miyahara and Go Shiozaki made it to the finals of their second World's Strongest Tag Determination League in a row, this time contested for the vacant World Tag Team Championship, but were again defeated there by Wild Burning (Jun Akiyama and Takao Omori). Miyahara and Suzuki's reign as the All Asia Tag Team Champions ended in their second defense on January 3, 2015, when they were defeated by Dark Kingdom representatives Mitsuya Nagai and Takeshi Minamino. On March 27, Miyahara received another shot at the Triple Crown Heavyweight Championship, but was defeated by the defending champion, Xceed stablemate Go Shiozaki. On May 6, Miyahara and Shiozaki defeated Akebono and Yutaka Yoshie to win the World Tag Team Championship. On June 4, Miyahara scored a major win, when he led Xceed to a six-man captain's fall tag team match win over the Evolution stable, scoring the deciding pinfall over Suwama. Following the win, Miyahara announced his intention of becoming the youngest Triple Crown Heavyweight Champion in history, challenging Akebono to a title match. However, the title match on June 21 ended with Miyahara once again being defeated. On September 28, Miyahara and Shiozaki vacated the World Tag Team Championship due to Shiozaki resigning from AJPW. On November 16, Xceed was disbanded, when Kotaro Suzuki also announced his departure from AJPW.

With Xceed gone, Miyahara was offered a spot in the Evolution stable. Though he turned down the offer, he agreed to team with Suwama in the 2015 World's Strongest Tag Determination League. On December 6, the two defeated Bodyguard and Zeus in the finals to win the tournament. Following the final match, Miyahara expressed interest in continuing to team up with Suwama, but was attacked by Suwama, who instead announced Naoya Nomura as the newest member of Evolution. Miyahara responded by announcing a new partnership with Jake Lee, vowing to start a generational change in AJPW. On December 25, the new team was named "Nextream".

==== Triple Crown Heavyweight Champion (2016–2020) ====
On February 12, 2016, Miyahara defeated Zeus in a decision match to win the vacant Triple Crown Heavyweight Championship for the first time. At 26 years and 350 days, Miyahara became the youngest Triple Crown Heavyweight Champion in history at the time, beating the previous record held by then 29-year-old Terry Gordy. On February 21, Miyahara failed in his bid to become a "Quintuple Crown Champion", when he and Jake Lee were defeated by Zeus and Bodyguard in a match for the World Tag Team Championship. Miyahara made his first successful defense of the Triple Crown Heavyweight Championship on March 21 against Takao Omori. His second title defense took place on May 25, when he defeated 2016 Champion Carnival winner Daisuke Sekimoto. On June 15, Miyahara defeated Kengo Mashimo for his third successful title defense and afterwards nominated Jun Akiyama as his next challenger, whom he went on to defeat in his fourth title defense on July 24. On August 27, Miyahara made his fifth successful title defense against Ryoji Sai. On November 27, Miyahara defeated Suwama in the main event of AJPW's first show in Ryōgoku Kokugikan in three years to make his sixth successful defense of the Triple Crown Heavyweight Championship. The following month, Miyahara and Jake Lee won their block in the 2016 World's Strongest Tag Determination League with a record of four wins and one loss, advancing to the finals of the tournament. On December 18, Miyahara and Lee were defeated in the finals of the tournament by Get Wild (Manabu Soya and Takao Omori).

After announcing his goal for 2017 of breaking the record for most successful defenses of the Triple Crown Heavyweight Championship, held by Toshiaki Kawada with his ten defenses, Miyahara made his seventh successful defense on January 15 by defeating Takao Omori. En route to his next defense, Miyahara teamed up with Jake Lee to unsuccessfully challenge Bodyguard and Zeus for the World Tag Team Championship on February 17. On February 26, Miyahara defeated Bodyguard for his eighth successful title defense. On May 21, Miyahara lost the Triple Crown Heavyweight Championship to 2017 Champion Carnival winner Shuji Ishikawa in his ninth defense. AJPW experienced greatly increased business during Miyahara's fifteen-month title reign. On August 27, Miyahara defeated Ishikawa at AJPW's 45th anniversary event in Ryōgoku Kokugikan to regain the Triple Crown Heavyweight Championship. He lost the title to 2017 Ōdō Tournament winner Suwama in his first defense on October 9. On February 3, 2018, Miyahara and Yoshitatsu defeated Suwama and Shuji Ishikawa to win the World Tag Team Championship. However, on February 25, they would lose the titles in their first defense to The Big Guns (Zeus and Bodyguard). Miyahara captured the Triple Crown for a third time on March 25, 2018, at a show at the Saitama Super Arena Community Hall by defeating Joe Doering. Throughout April, Miyahara, while still champion, participated in the 2018 Champion Carnival, where he won his block with a record of five wins and two losses. However, in the finals on April 30, he was defeated by Pro Wrestling NOAH's Naomichi Marufuji. He defeated Marufuji in a rematch on May 24 to successfully defend the title. On June 12, he defeated Dylan James for his second successful defense. However, on July 29, he lost the championship in his third defense to Zeus. On September 24, Miyahara defeated Kengo Mashimo to win the Ōdō Tournament, thus, giving him his rematch for the Triple Crown Championship. He defeated Zeus on October 21 to regain the Title and begin his fourth reign. Miyahara participated in the 2018 World's Strongest Tag Determination League along with Yoshitatsu, both of them would make 10 points, winning 5 matches and losing 5, failing to advance to the finals.

On January 3, 2019, Miyahara made his first successful defence against KAI. On February 24, he made his second defence against long-term rival Suwama, right after the match, Naoya Nomura came to the ring and challenged Miyahara to a title match, which the champion accepted. This led to a match between the former partners on March 19, where Miyahara became victorious. He participated in the Champion Carnival, making 10 points, winning 5 matches and losing 3, advancing to the finals. On April 29, the champion defeated Jake Lee to win the Champion Carnival for the first time. Miyahara successfully defended his title against Shuji Ishikawa on May 20. 2019 became the third year when the Triple Crown did not change hands, Miyahara's fourth reign becoming the third overall in terms of length, after Mitsuharu Misawa's first reign (705 days, lasted all of 1993), and Toshiaki Kawada's fifth reign (529 days, lasted all of 2004), before finally losing the belt back to Suwama on March 23, 2020.

==== NEXTREAM Revival & Zennichi Shin Jidai (2020–present) ====
After being dethroned from the Triple Crown, Miyahara would compete mainly in the tag division, teaming with the likes of Jiro Kuroshio, Francesco Akira and Yoshi Tatsu from March up until August. This would climax with Miyahara & Kuroshio unsuccessfully challenging the Violent Giants (Suwama & Shuji Ishikawa) for the AJPW World Tag Team Championship belts on August 30. With the arrival of September, so came the arrival of the AJPW 2020 Champion Carnival. Miyahara would round off his score with three victories and one loss (6 points) in the B-Block, and make it to the finals, yet would be defeated by Zeus on October 5. While Miyahara would be lying on the mat defeated, an old ally and foe in the form of Yuma Aoyagi would come to his aid. Aoyagi who had been a member of the original Nextream, was ousted from the stable when he would be defeated by Miyahara on February 11, in a bid for the Triple Crown. Soon later Miyahara & Yuma would regularly be teaming together under the umbrella of a revived form of Nextream.

Into November, the team would take part in the 2020 AJPW Real World Tag League, and would accumulate a score of 10 points, with two losses and five wins, including the tournament final against Jake Lee & Koji Iwamoto on December 7. With the title of being the 2020 Real World Tag League victors, they would defeat the Violent Giants on January 1, 2021, and become the new World Tag Team Champions. Kento would then induct two new members into the stable: Yuma's brother Atsuki & Rising HAYATO. On February 23, Miyahara & Aoyagi would defeat the team of Abdullah Kobayashi & Daisuke Sekimoto, who had challenged them on February 2, and would complete their first successful defense of the World Tag Team belts.

On January 23, 2022, Miyahara defeated Ryuki Honda in a tournament final to win the vacant Triple Crown Heavyweight Championship for the fifth time. In April, Miyahara took part in the 2022 Champion Carnival, finishing the tournament with a record of two wins, two draws and one loss, failing to advance to the finals of the tournament, after drawing with Nextream stablemate Yuma Aoyagi on the final day. On June 20, Miyahara lost the Triple Crown Heavyweight Championship to Jake Lee, suffering his first singles loss against him. On August 20, Miyahara defeated Lee in the finals to win the 2022 Ōdō Tournament. On September 18, Miyahara defeated Suwama to win the Triple Crown Heavyweight Championship for the sixth time. From November 13 until December 7, Miyahara and Takuya Nomura took part in the 2022 World's Strongest Tag Determination League as "Miyaken to Takuya", winning the tournament, with a record of four wins and three losses;, the two defeated Shuji Ishikawa and Cyrus in the finals to win the tournament. On January 2, 2023, Miyahara and Nomura defeated Suwama and KONO to win World Tag Team Championship. They lost the titles to Yuma Aoyagi and Naoya Nomura on January 22.

On February 4, 2023, after successfully defending the Triple Crown Heavyweight Championship against Yuma Aoyagi, Miyahara formed a stable alongside Yuma and his brother Atsuki Aoyagi, Rising HAYATO, Shuji Ishikawa, Yuma Anzai and Ryo Inoue, dubbed "Zennichi Shin Jidai" (New Age of All Japan), serving as a reaction against the influence of wrestlers from other promotions, who appeared or held titles in AJPW making them an anti-invader stable. On February 19, Miyahara lost the Triple Crown Heavyweight Championship to New Japan Pro-Wrestling's Yuji Nagata. Later that month, Miyahara began feuding with Pro Wrestling NOAH's Masa Kitamiya, who was his junior during their years as part of Diamond Ring. On February 27, Kitamiya's partner Yoshiki Inamura confronted Miyahara, leading to a match between the two on March 14, with Miyahara demanded that Kitamiya came as Inamura's second. At the event, Miyahara defeated Inamura. Afterwards, Miyahara requested that NOAH competed in a match on March 21 and that Kitamiya should be involved. On March 21, Miyahara, Yuma Anzai and Ryo Inoue faced Kitamiya, Inamura and Kinya Okada in a losing effort, ending their feud. From April 8 and May 7, Miyahara took part in the 2023 Champion Carnival, finishing the tournament with a record of four wins and three losses, failing to advance to the finals of the tournament. On June 15, Miyahara and Aoyagi defeated Kongo's Kenoh and Manabu Soya to win the World Tag Team Championship, Miyahara's sixth individual reign. On June 17, Miyahara was challenged by Katsuhiko Nakajima to a singles match at NOAH's One Night Dream event on July 15. Their match was made official on June 21 in a press conference, with Miyahara slapping Nakajima to the floor during a stand-off. To Nakajima, Miyahara's behavior stemmed from jealousy, which he said was a "hindrance"; to Miyahara, it was a sense of incompatibility and a battle to overcome his senior for the position in wrestling he had seen Nakajima hold for so long. At One Night Dream, Miyahara was defeated by Nakajima in a match that was rated 5 and a quarter stars by Dave Meltzer of the Wrestling Observer Newsletter.

== Outside of wrestling ==
He joined SASUKE 39 at 28 December 2021. He failed Stage 1 at Rolling Hill.

== Championships and accomplishments ==
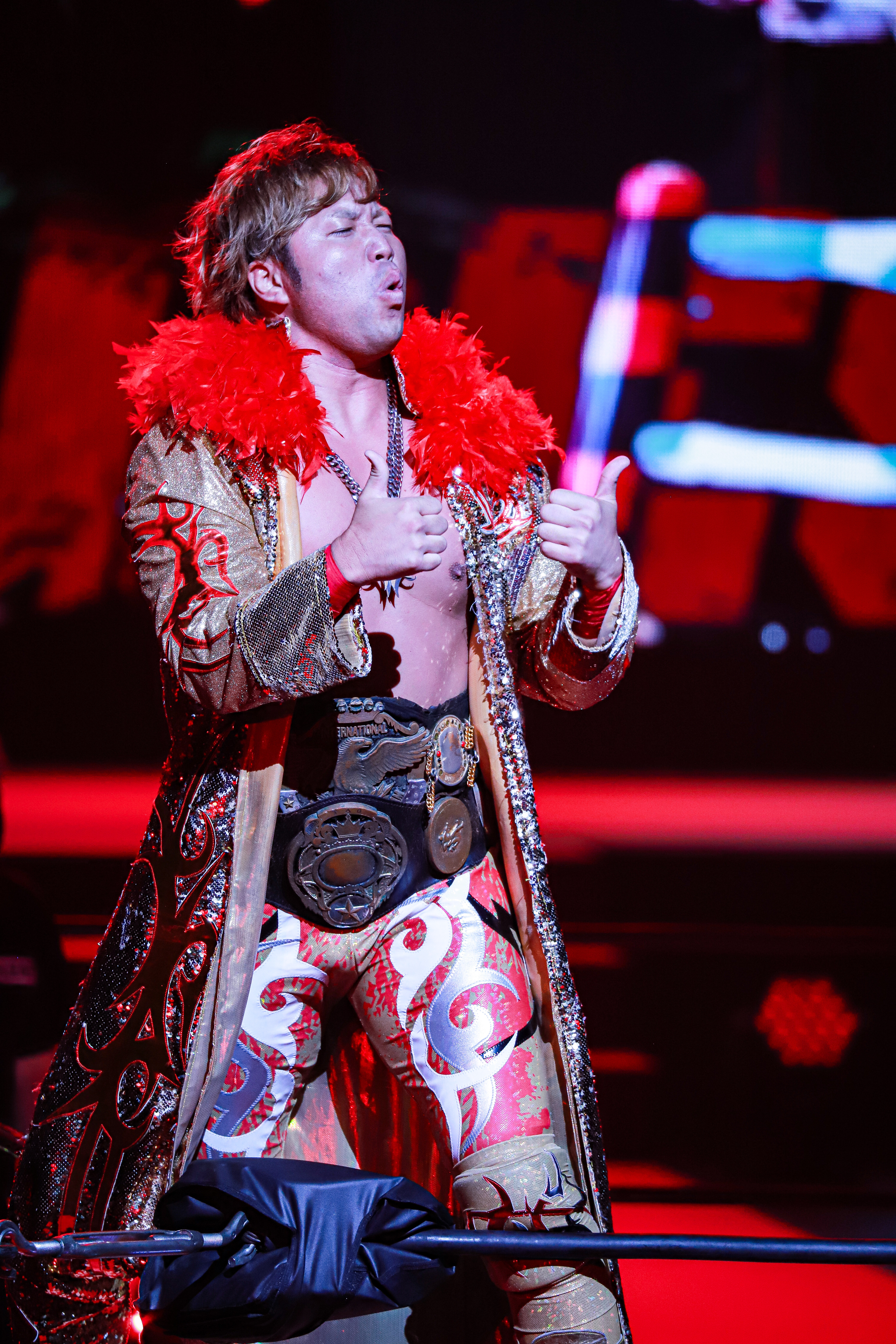
In AJPW, Miyahara is a six-time World Tag Team Champion

- All Japan Pro Wrestling
  - All Asia Tag Team Championship (1 time) – with Kotaro Suzuki
  - Triple Crown Heavyweight Championship (7 times, current)
  - World Tag Team Championship (6 times) – with Go Shiozaki (1), Yoshitatsu (1), Yuma Aoyagi (3) and Takuya Nomura (1)
  - World's Strongest Tag Determination League (2015) – with Suwama
  - World's Strongest Tag Determination League (2020, 2021) – with Yuma Aoyagi
  - World's Strongest Tag Determination League (2022) – with Takuya Nomura
  - Nemuro Shokudō Cup 6-Man Tag Tournament (2017) – with Jake Lee and Yuma Aoyagi
  - Triple Crown Heavyweight Championship Tournament (2022)
  - Royal Road Tournament (2018, 2022, 2025)
  - Champion Carnival (2019, 2024)
- Kensuke Office
  - Summer Volcano Tag Tournament (2011) – with Antonio Honda
- Pro Wrestling Illustrated
  - Ranked No. 24 of the top 500 singles wrestlers in the PWI 500 in 2019 and 2020
- Pro Wrestling Noah
  - One Night 6-Man Tag Tournament (2012) – with Kensuke Sasaki and Takeshi Morishima
  - Global Tag League Fighting Spirit Award (2012) – with Kensuke Sasaki
  - Global Tag League Outstanding Performance Award (2011) – with Kensuke Sasaki
  - NTV G+ Cup Junior Heavyweight Tag League Outstanding Performance Award (2009) – with Katsuhiko Nakajima
  - NTV G+ Cup Junior Heavyweight Tag League Outstanding Performance Award (2011) – with Satoshi Kajiwara
- Tokyo Sports
  - Outstanding Performance Award (2016, 2019, 2022)
