= Shuji Ishikawa =

Japanese professional wrestler (born 1975)

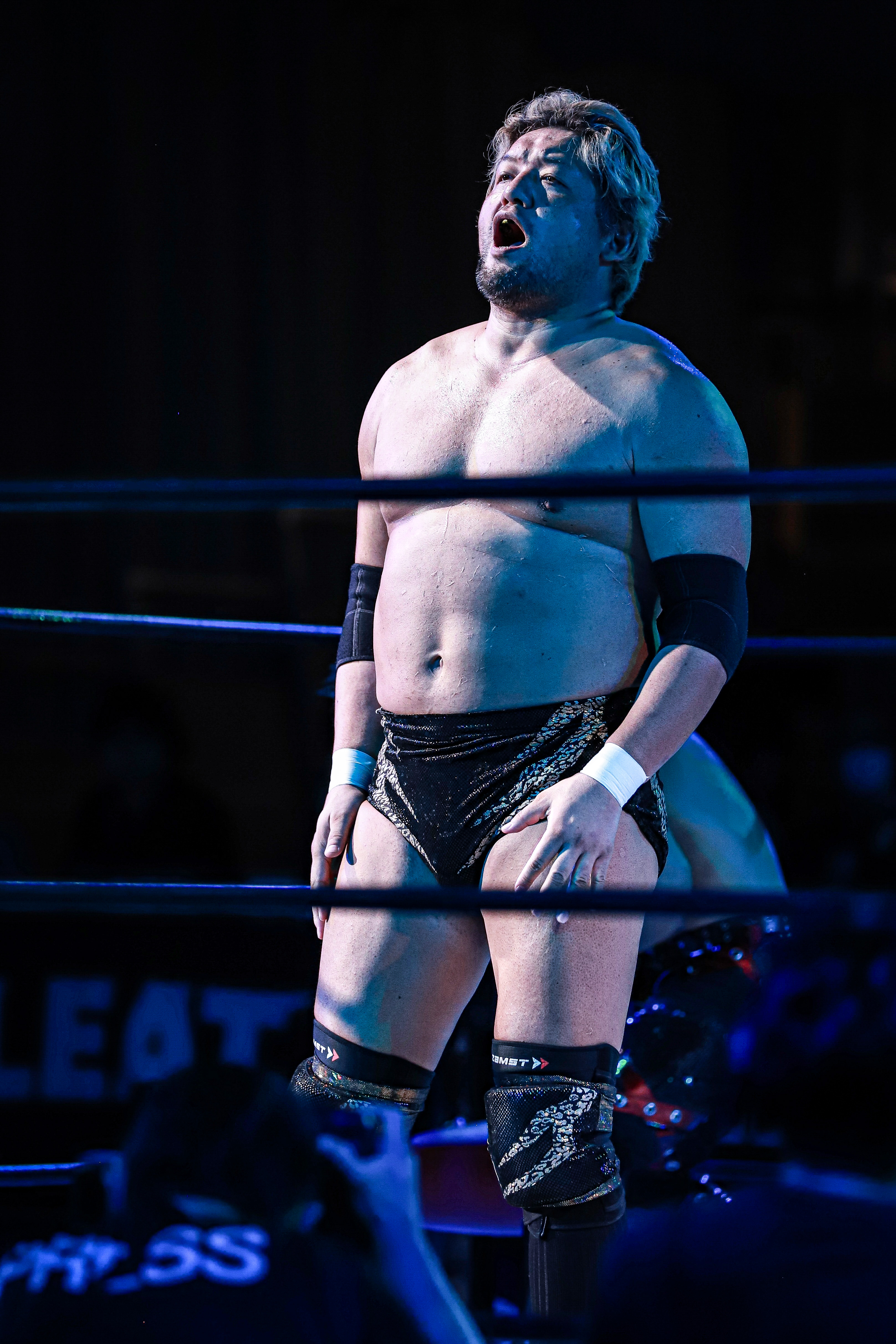
- Ishikawa in 2023

Personal information
- Born: September 25, 1975 (age 51) Iwata, Shizuoka, Japan

Professional wrestling career
- Ring name(s): Big Shoe; Giant; Giant Bashoku; Giant Hero; Giant Marines; Hiroko Mangrove; J. Ace; Jaiant Hebi Ishikawa; Jaiko Ishikawa; Koo; The Mummy; Pitarri; Tokeidai Otoko; Shuji Ishikawa
- Billed height: 196 cm (6 ft 5 in)
- Billed weight: 130 kg (287 lb)
- Trained by: Dramatic Dream Team
- Debut: May 8, 2003

Shuji Ishikawa (石川 修司, Ishikawa Shūji; born September 25, 1975) is a Japanese professional wrestler, He is signed to All Japan Pro Wrestling (AJPW), where he is a former one-time Gaora TV Champion, Triple Crown Heavyweight Champion, World Tag Team Champion and the winner of the 2017 Champion Carnival. and he is a Winner 2 time World's Strongest Tag Determination League (2017, 2019) with Suwama. He also performs for Pro Wrestling Noah, where he is a current GHC Openweight Hardcore Champion in his second reign.

Ishikawa is also known for his work in DDT Pro-Wrestling and Big Japan Pro Wrestling (BJW), as well as numerous other independent promotions. He is a former KO-D Openweight Champion, BJW Deathmatch Heavyweight Champion and BJW World Strong Heavyweight Champion.

== Early life ==
Ishikawa was friends with fellow future professional wrestler Takashi Sasaki as a teenager, whom he met through judo.

== Professional wrestling career ==
=== DDT Pro-Wrestling (2003–2018) ===
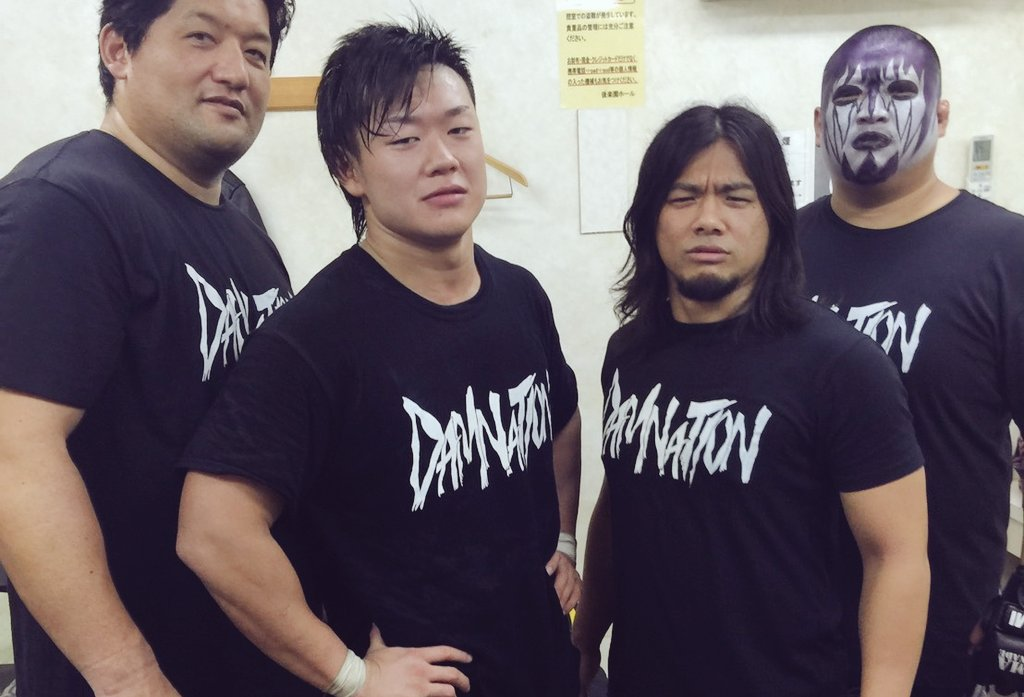
Ishikawa (far left) as part of Damnation

After meeting Sanshiro Takagi, Ishikawa was invited to a tryout for DDT Pro Wrestling in 2002. Despite failing the tryout, Ishikawa was invited to work for the company anyway and served as an accountant and receptionist for DDT between 2002 and 2003, while occasionally training as a wrestler. When DDT moved into JWP's dojo in 2003, Ishikawa began training more regularly. As the DDT roster was running short due to older wrestlers retiring and others sustaining injuries, Takagi bought Ishikawa up to the main roster with limited training in May 2003. He made his debut at the age of 27 in a loss to Seiya Morohashi. Early in his career and due to his size Ishikawa wore red trunks, red knee pads and black boots as an homage to Giant Baba. In 2004, Ishikawa was paired up with Poison Sawada Julie, joining his Serpent Council stable. After achieving little success in his early career, Ishikawa began competing more sporadically in DDT, instead becoming a regular in DDT's sister promotion Union Pro Wrestling, where he gained considerable popularity due to his size. In 2007, Ishikawa officially became recognised as the ace of UPW after Poison Sawada Julie left the promotion. Ishikawa competed in high-profile feuds with Style-E's Kyosuke Sasaki and Pro Wrestling Zero1's Yoshihito Sasaki, as well as regularly competing in DDT once again under a mask as Koo in the Hawaii Army stable. On June 3, 2007, Ishikawa defeated Harashima to capture the KO-D Openweight Championship for the first time. He held on to the belt until October, where he was defeated by Harashima in a rematch. Ishikawa began his second reign in late 2009, defeating Kota Ibushi on November 29, holding it until February 2010, when he was defeated by Daisuke Sekimoto at a Union Pro event.

On March 27, 2011, at DDT's 14 Anniversary Show, Ishikawa won a battle royal, giving him the right to a KO-D Openweight Championship match in the future. Ishikawa captured the championship for a third time on May 4, 2011, defeating Dick Togo. Ishikawa held the championship until July, when he was defeated by Kudo at Ryogoku Peter Pan. In 2016, Ishikawa won the KO-D Tag Team Championship for the first time in his career, teaming with Daisuke Sasaki to defeat Konosuke Takeshita and Tetsuya Endo on March 21. On July 3, Ishikawa and Sasaki lost the title to Ken Ohka and Kai. In May 2016, Ishikawa formed the Damnation stable along with Sasaki, Mad Paulie and later Tetsuya Endo. Ishikawa captured the KO-D Openweight Championship for a fourth time in August 2016, defeating Konosuke Takeshita at Peter Pan. Ishikawa held on to the belt until December, when he was defeated by Harashima at Osaka Octopus. Beginning in 2017, Ishikawa's appearances in DDT began to decrease due to his commitments with All Japan Pro Wrestling (AJPW), however, he continues to make sporadic appearances.

=== Big Japan Pro Wrestling (2009–present) ===
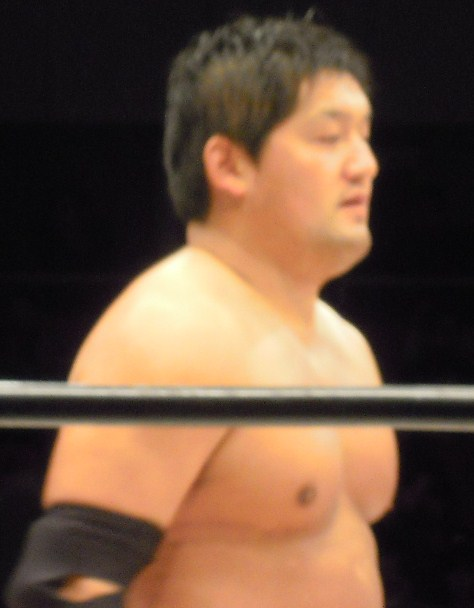
Ishikawa in 2010

Ishikawa competed in his first ever deathmatch on January 2, 2009, teaming with Ryuji Ito to take on childhood friend Takashi Sasaki and Yuko Miyamoto. Ishikawa would go on to become a mainstay in BJW, capturing his first championship in the company on May 4, 2012, teaming with Shigehiro Irie to defeat Shinobu and Yoshihito Sasaki to win the BJW World Tag Team Championship. Irie and Ishikawa held the title until July of that year, when they were defeated by Shinobu and Yuji Okabayashi. Ishikawa defeated longtime rival Abdullah Kobayashi to become the BJW Deathmatch Heavyweight Champion on January 2, 2013, four years after competing in his first ever deathmatch. Ishikawa would go on to hold the championship for 11 months, until he was defeated by Isami Kodaka. After the loss to Kodaka, Ishikawa announced that he would no longer be competing in deathmatches, and would instead be focusing on the strong division. In 2014, Ishikawa achieved his first major success in BJW's strong division, defeating Daisuke Sekimoto to win the Ikkitosen Strong Climb tournament. Later that year, Ishikawa began teaming with Kohei Sato as the "Twin Towers" with much success, defeating the team of Yuko Miyamoto and Isami Kodaka on May 31, 2014, to win the BJW Tag Team Championships. Ishikawa and Sato successfully retained the championships for 516 days, until they were defeated by Yuji Okabayashi and Daisuke Sekimoto on October 29, 2015. In 2016, Ishikawa won the Ikkitosen Strong Climb Tournament for a second time, defeating Daichi Hashimoto and Hideyoshi Kamitani in the semi-final and final respectively on the same night to win. Ishikawa and Sato once again captured the BJW World Tag Team Championships on May 30, 2016, defeating Hideyoshi Kamitani and Ryota Hama.

=== All Japan Pro Wrestling (2015–present) ===
Ishikawa debuted for All Japan Pro Wrestling (AJPW) in 2015, and in September of that year, took part in the Ōdō Tournament, making it to the semi-final where he was eliminated by Akebono. In December, he teamed with Hoshitango in the Real World Tag League, finishing with six points but failing to advance past the group stages. On March 27, 2016, Ishikawa and Hoshitango unsuccessfully challenged Zeus and The Bodyguard for the World Tag Team Championship. In April 2017, Ishikawa took part in his first Champion Carnival, finishing first in his block and highest of anybody in the tournament with 9 points. On April 30, 2017, he defeated Joe Doering to win the tournament. On May 21, he defeated Miyahara to win the Triple Crown Heavyweight Championship for the first time in his career. He lost the title back to Miyahara on August 27. He began to form an alliance with Suwama in late 2017. Calling themselves "Violence Giant", the two entered the World's Strongest Tag Determination League in December, where they defeated Daichi Hashimoto and Hideyoshi Kamitani in the finals to win the tournament. On January 3, they won the World Tag Team Championship by defeating Wild Burning (Takao Omori and Jun Akiyama). They dropped the belts to Kento Miyahara and Yoshi Tatsu on February 3. They won the belts back on June 30, beating Ryoji Sai and Dylan James. They once again entered the World Tag League in December 2018, making it to the final where they lost to Dylan James and Joe Doering, however, they managed to retain the championships in the rematch. They dropped the belts to Daisuke Sekimoto and Yuji Okabayashi at a BJW show on January 13, but regained them on March 19 in Korakuen Hall.

== Championships and accomplishments ==
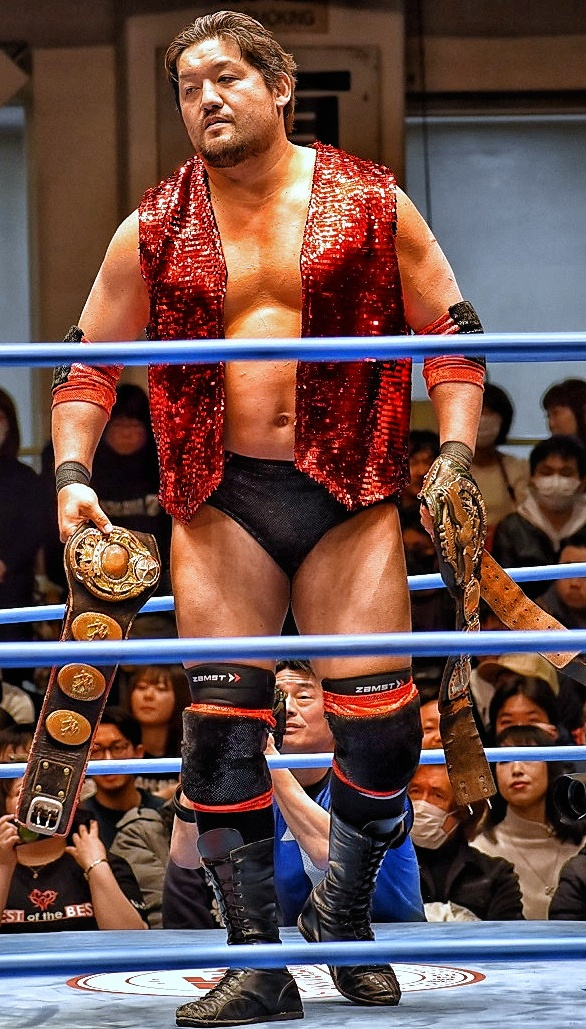
In All Japan Pro Wrestling, Ishikawa is a former Triple Crown Heavyweight Champion

- All Japan Pro Wrestling
  - Gaora TV Championship (1 time)
  - Triple Crown Heavyweight Championship (1 time)
  - World Tag Team Championship (5 times) – with Suwama (4) and Kohei Sato (1)
  - AJPW TV Six-Man Tag Team Championship (1 time) – with Chihiro Hashimoto and Yuu
  - Champion Carnival (2017)
  - World's Strongest Tag Determination League (2017, 2019) – with Suwama
- Big Japan Pro Wrestling
  - BJW Deathmatch Heavyweight Championship (1 time)
  - BJW World Strong Heavyweight Championship (1 time)
  - BJW Tag Team Championship (3 times) – with Shigehiro Irie (1) and Kohei Sato (2)
  - Ikkitousen Strong Climb (2014, 2016)
- DDT Pro-Wrestling
  - KO-D Openweight Championship (4 times)
  - DDT Extreme Championship (1 time)
  - KO-D Tag Team Championship (1 time) – with Daisuke Sasaki
  - King of DDT Tournament (2016)
  - D-Oh Grand Prix (2018)
- Japan Indie Awards
  - Best Bout Award (2013) vs. Isami Kodaka on November 4
  - Best Unit Award (2016, 2017) Damnation with Daisuke Sasaki, Mad Paulie and Tetsuya Endo
  - MVP Award (2016)
- Kyushu Pro-Wrestling
  - Kyushu Pro-Wrestling Championship (1 time)
- Pro-Wrestling Basara
  - Union Max Championship (1 time)
- Pro Wrestling Illustrated
  - Ranked No. 106 of the top 500 singles wrestlers in the PWI 500 in 2019
- Pro Wrestling Noah
  - GHC Openweight Hardcore Championship (2 times, current)
- Tokyo Sports
  - Best Tag Team Award (2017, 2018, 2019) with Suwama
- Union Pro Wrestling
  - UWA World Tag Team Championship (1 time) - with Masato Shibata
