= Dark Kingdom (disambiguation) =

The Dark Kingdom is an organization of antagonists in the Sailor Moon manga series.

Dark Kingdom may also refer to:

- "Dark Kingdom" arc, the corresponding Sailor Moon first season story arc
- Dark Kingdom (professional wrestling), a professional wrestling stable
- Dark Kingdom: The Dragon King, a 2004 fantasy film and mini-series
- Untold Legends: Dark Kingdom, a 2006 hack and slash video game
