= Kenzo Suzuki (wrestler) =

Japanese professional wrestler (born 1974)

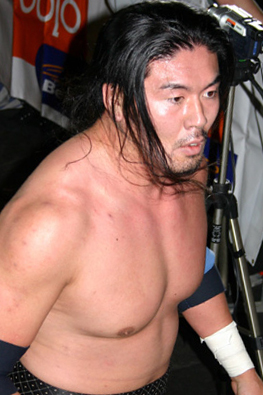
- Suzuki in 2005

Personal information
- Born: July 25, 1974 (age 52) Hekinan, Aichi, Japan
- Spouse: Hiroko Suzuki (m. 2003)

Professional wrestling career
- Ring name(s): Kenso; Kenzo Suzuki
- Billed height: 1.91 m (6 ft 3 in)
- Billed weight: 118 kg (260 lb)
- Billed from: The Land of the Rising Sun; Tokyo, Japan
- Trained by: Kensuke Sasaki; Seiji Sakaguchi
- Debut: January 4, 2000

Kenzo Suzuki (鈴木 健三, Suzuki Kenzō; born July 25, 1974) is a Japanese professional wrestler. He is perhaps best known for his appearances with New Japan Pro-Wrestling (NJPW), in Mexico with Asistencia Asesoría y Administración (AAA) and in the United States with World Wrestling Entertainment (WWE), where he was a one-time WWE Tag Team Champion in the latter company. He currently performs for All Japan Pro Wrestling (AJPW) under the ring name Kenso, where he is a one-time World Tag Team Champion and a one-time Gaora TV Champion.

== Early career ==
Suzuki was a rugby union player, playing at the international level for Japan prior to his professional debut as a wrestler in January 2000.

== Professional wrestling career ==
=== Early career (2000–2003) ===
Suzuki debuted on January 4, 2000, at New Japan Pro-Wrestling (NJPW)'s Wrestling World 2000 event at the Tokyo Dome, losing to Manabu Nakanishi. Later that year, Suzuki won NJPW's Young Lion Cup tournament, defeating Shinya Makabe. He also won Rookie of the Year honors from NJPW in the same year. Following this, he would go on to win the Young Lion Tournament after defeating Hiroshi Tanahashi in the finals, later forming a tag team with Tanahashi known as The Kings of the Hills.

In 2003, Suzuki resigned from NJPW, choosing to follow his mentor and trainer, Riki Choshu, to Choshu's World Japan promotion. Later in the year, he left to wrestle in the United States. It is speculated that he was forced to resign because a wrestler he was helping to train, Giant Ochiai, died while training on his watch. As a result, this led to Suzuki venturing to the United States' independent circuit, where he worked for the Major League Wrestling (MLW) and Total Nonstop Action Wrestling (TNA) promotions during 2003 before ultimately quitting World Japan, citing a lack of competition within the latter promotion.

=== World Wrestling Entertainment (2004–2005) ===
In 2004, Suzuki signed a developmental contract with World Wrestling Entertainment (WWE) and was assigned to their developmental territory Ohio Valley Wrestling (OVW) in February. Originally, Suzuki was scheduled to debut on the Raw brand in May under the ring name Hirohito. He was to be presented as the grandson of Emperor Michi Hirohito, who ruled Japan during World War II. He would portray a Japanese patriot, holding anti-American views and wanting revenge on America for the atomic bombings of Hiroshima and Nagasaki. However, the gimmick was dropped after the first vignette aired on the April 19, 2004 edition of Raw. Suzuki and his wife, Hiroko, reportedly told Vince McMahon directly that it would be extremely offensive in Japan and cause big problems for the company doing future business there. Suzuki also told Bruce Prichard that Emperor Hirohito was not as beloved in Japan as they thought.

Suzuki and Hiroko were instead moved to the SmackDown! brand. Suzuki used his given name and Hiroko was used as his geisha valet. Their real-life marriage was not mentioned on television. Together, they made their television debut on the June 10 episode of SmackDown!, where Suzuki defeated Scotty 2 Hotty. Suzuki then began a short feud with Billy Gunn, which ended with Suzuki defeating Gunn at The Great American Bash. On the July 15 episode of SmackDown!, Suzuki, René Duprée, and Booker T defeated John Cena in a 3-on-1 elimination match. on the July 29 episode of SmackDown!, Suzuki competed in an 8-man elimination match for the vacant United States Championship, which was won by Booker T. On the September 2 episode of SmackDown!, Suzuki, Duprée and Booker T lost to Cena, Rob Van Dam and Rey Mysterio.

On the September 9 episode of SmackDown!, Suzuki and Duprée defeated Paul London and Billy Kidman to win the WWE Tag Team Championship. During the title reign, Suzuki adopted a comedic pro-American gimmick that saw him poorly sing popular songs. At No Mercy, Suzuki and Duprée successfully defended their titles against Rob Van Dam and Rey Mysterio. After continued weeks of feuding, Suzuki and Duprée lost the titles to Van Dam and Mysterio on the December 9 episode of SmackDown!. They failed to regain the titles in a rematch at Armageddon.

Suzuki entered a feud with John Cena over the United States Championship. On the January 6, 2005, episode of SmackDown!, Suzuki challenged United States Champion John Cena to a battle rap. He then challenged Cena for the championship on the January 13 and 27 episodes of SmackDown!, but was unsuccessful in both attempts.

Suzuki entered the Royal Rumble match as the sixth entrant, but was eliminated by Rey Mysterio. His final WWE match came on the February 26 episode of Velocity where he lost to Booker T. In the following months, Suzuki suffered a collapsed lung. He returned to Ohio Valley Wrestling to continue his recovery. Suzuki and Hiroko were traded to Raw during the 2005 Draft Lottery. However, the pair were released from their contracts on July 6, 2005, before ever making an appearance on the brand.

=== Hustle and Consejo Mundial de Lucha Libre (2005–2006) ===
After leaving WWE, Suzuki returned to Japan, where he began performing for Hustle and wrestled in a number of humorous matches against the likes of Liosazer and Razor Ramon HG. In addition to Hustle, Suzuki also began performing for Consejo Mundial de Lucha Libre (CMLL) alongside fellow WWE alumnus Mark Jindrak, who began performing as Marco Corleone. Together, they were put into a feud with Shocker and Universo 2000, which led to Suzuki and Corleone losing a hair vs. hair match on June 12 and thus being forced to have their heads shaved. Following this, Suzuki was used sparingly before eventually leaving CMLL.

=== AAA (2007–2010, 2015) ===
On March 13, Suzuki was seen on AAA after jumping from the rival CMLL. He is a part of the Legion Extranjera with Konnan as the ring leader. On July 7, Suzuki lost his hair in the main event of AAA's Triplemanía XV. Sean Waltman was also in the match with his fiancee, Alicia Webb. Suzuki has been an active member of Konnan's Legion Extranjera since his debut and he had an opportunity for the AAA Mega Championship against Cibernético. He has teamed up with the returning Electroshock who is also a member of the Legion Extranjera. They have feuded with La Parka and Octagón. As of Triplemania XVI he has received a mini who accompanied him to the ring for a six-man tag match teaming with Electroshock and Bobby Lashley to take on Chessman, La Parka, and the returning Silver King. Suzuki's team won in the end. Suzuki was part of the 2009 Rey de Reyes, losing to La Parka on March 15.

After Triplemania XVII, Konnan's Legion Extranjera lost control of AAA; Konnan was suspended from Mexican wrestling for an indefinite time. At this time Legion Extranjera was dissolved leaving only Electroshock, Chessman, and Suzuki. Suzuki made an alliance with El Oriental and they formed their own team with Sugi San getting victories in their debut. They would lose to the Psycho Circus at Verano de Escandalo. In December 2009, Suzuki re-joined La Legión Extranjera before leaving the promotion in mid-2010.

Suzuki returned to AAA on May 24, 2015, when he, Masamune and Tiger Mask III formed a trio for the Lucha Libre World Cup. They were defeated in the first round of the tournament by Team MexLeyendas (Blue Demon Jr., Dr. Wagner Jr. and El Solar).

=== Dragon Gate (2007) ===
On November 7, 2007, Suzuki made his debut in Dragon Gate as the surprise member of the Muscle Outlaw'z unit. He came out to Anthony W. Mori's entrance theme to trick the Typhoon unit into believing one of their own betrayed them. Suzuki competed in a six-man tag team match with new teammates Genki Horiguchi and Yasushi Kanda against Cima, Dragon Kid, and Ryo Saito that resulted in a disqualification loss for his team after assaulting the referee. Afterward, he and the rest of the MO'z assaulted Dragon Kid and removed the ring ropes to be used against him. This set up a match between Suzuki and Dragon Kid at the big November 25 show in Osaka. On November 18, he faced Kenichiro Arai in Fukuoka in his first match for the promotion.

=== All Japan Pro Wrestling (2010–2019) ===
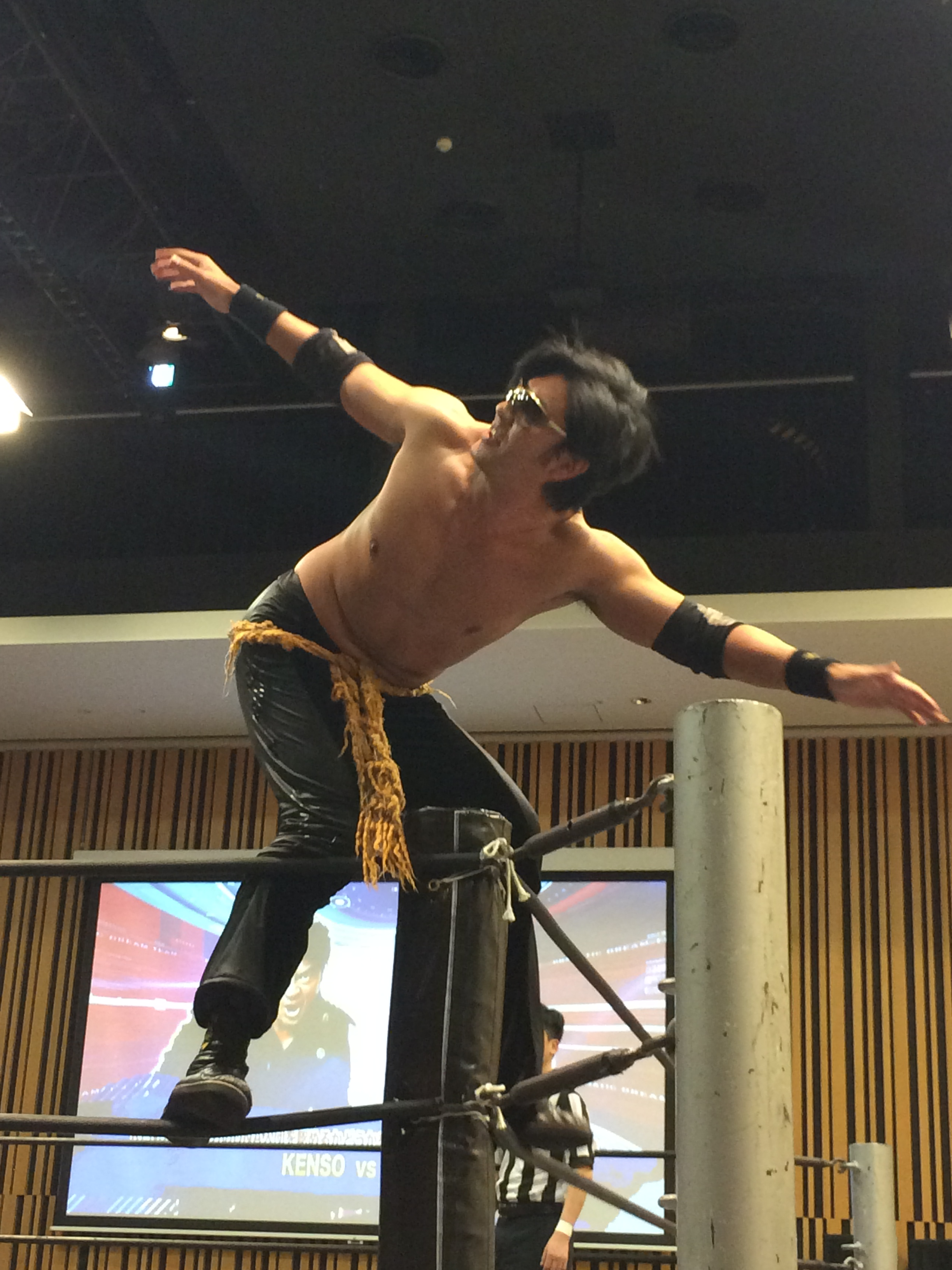
Kenso in April 2016

On July 25, 2010, Suzuki, disguised under a La Parka mask, made his debut for All Japan Pro Wrestling (AJPW), helping the Voodoo Murders put Keiji Mutoh through a table. Afterwards, Suzuki unmasked himself, adopted the ring name Kenso and joined the heel group, which also included his former tag team partner René Duprée. On November 20, 2010, Kenso entered the World's Strongest Tag Determination League, teaming with fellow Voodoo Murders member Kono. After winning six out of their eight round robin stage matches, Kenso and Kono finished first in the group and on December 7 defeated Ryota Hama and Suwama in the finals to win the 2010 World's Strongest Tag Determination League. Kenso and Kono received their shot at the World Tag Team Championship on January 3, 2011, but were defeated by the defending champions, Akebono and Taiyō Kea. Shortly afterwards Kenso left the Voodoo Murders, turning face and on February 13, 2011, defeated Kono and Akebono in a three-way match to become the number one contender to the Triple Crown Heavyweight Championship, held by Suwama. On March 21 Kenso failed in his challenge for the AJPW Triple Crown Heavyweight Championship. On June 19, Kenso and The Great Muta defeated Akebono and Ryota Hama to win the vacant World Tag Team Championship. After losing the title to Dark Cuervo and Dark Ozz on October 23, Muta turned on Kenso. The turn was part of a storyline, where other AJPW wrestlers did not take Kenso seriously and refused to team with him as part of his Kenso Kakumei ("Kenso Revolution") stable. After failed attempts to form new partnerships with Kaz Hayashi and Great Sasuke, Kenso announced on November 18, 2013, that he had decided to join Go Shiozaki's new Xceed stable. However, in the two's first match together three days later, Kenso turned on Shiozaki and announced he was forming a new heel stable named Dark Kingdom (DK) with foreigners Bambi Killer and D'Lo Brown. On April 23, 2014, Kenso introduced AJPW outsiders Bear Fukuda, Kengo Mashimo, Kenichiro Arai, Mitsuya Nagai and Takeshi Minamino as the newest members of DK, proclaiming this the "real beginning" of the stable. On December 14, Kenso won his first singles title in AJPW, when he defeated Kotaro Suzuki for the Gaora TV Championship. He lost the title to Sushi in his fourth defense on June 4, 2015. On July 31, it was announced that Kenso would begin freelancing following the expiration of his AJPW contract. He would, however, continue working for AJPW as a freelancer. He took a hiatus from wrestling.

=== Return to wrestling (2021-present) ===
Suzuki returned to wrestling in 2021.

== Personal life ==
Suzuki married Hiroko Suzuki in 2003, who acted as his valet during their time in WWE.

== Championships and accomplishments ==
- All Japan Pro Wrestling

- Gaora TV Championship (1 time)
- World Tag Team Championship (1 time) –with The Great Muta
- World's Strongest Tag Determination League (2010) –with KONO

- DDT Pro-Wrestling

- KO-D 6-Man Tag Team Championship (1 time) –with Danshoku Dino and Super Sasadango Machine
- King of Dark Championship (1 time)

- Ganbare☆Pro-Wrestling

- World's Strongest Ganbare Tag Tournament (2017) – with Kazma Sakamoto

- New Japan Pro-Wrestling

- Young Lion Cup (2000)
- Young Lion Tournament (2002)

- Pro Wrestling Illustrated

- PWI ranked him #392 of the top 500 singles wrestlers in the PWI 500 in 2010

- Tokyo Sports

- Rookie of the Year (2000)

- VKF Battle Entertainment

- VKF Championship (1 time)

- World Wrestling Entertainment

- WWE Tag Team Championship (1 time) –with René Duprée

=== Luchas de apuestas record ===
Winner (wager)	Loser (wager)	Location	Event	Date	Notes
Shocker and Universo 2000 (hair)	Marco Corleone and Kenzo Suzuki (hair)	Mexico City, Mexico	Sin Piedad	December 15, 2006	
Cibernético (hair)	Kenzo Suzuki (hair)	Mexico City, Mexico State	Triplemanía XV	July 15, 2007	(Note: Steel Cage match that also included Charly Manson, Chessman, X-Pac, and El Mesias.)
