= Chris Raaber =

Austrian professional wrestler

Personal information
- Born: September 6, 1981 (age 45) Leoben, Styria, Austria

Professional wrestling career
- Ring name(s): Bambikiller / Bambi Killer; Chris Raab; Chris Raaber; Chris the Bambikiller; Christoph Herzog; Flaming Spirit; Kristof Hertzog; Narciso
- Billed height: 6 ft 4 in (1.93 m)
- Billed weight: 255 lb (116 kg)
- Trained by: Dory Funk Jr. Michael Kovac; Ian Rotten; FCW; Riki Choshu
- Debut: May 9, 1998

Chris Raaber (born September 6, 1981) is an Austrian professional wrestler, better known by his ring name Bambikiller (occasionally spelled Bambi Killer). He runs his own promotion European Wrestling Association.

Raaber is a former one time (Zero1) World Heavyweight Champion, one-time wXw Heavyweight Champion and four-time EWA World Heavyweight Champion.

== Professional wrestling career ==
=== Europe ===
In 1997, Chris Raaber met with Michael Kovac who was wrestling in Europe; by then Raaber accepted Kovac's offer to teach him to wrestle. At the age of 16, Raaber made his debut in Independent Wrestling World wrestling in Hannover, Niedersachsen, Germany, against Gary Mountain as he lost by disqualification. Less than a year into his career, Raaber won the WFU Rookie Trophy by defeating German Kid in the finals of the tournament. During his early years, Raaber wrestled for several German promotions including German Wrestling Association, German Wrestling Federation and NWA Germany.

After a short stint in North America, Raaber returned to Germany, making his debut for Westside Xtreme Wrestling in May 2001. After winning a number one contenders tournament, Raaber faced Mad Cow for the vacant wXw World Heavyweight Championship, which he lost. However, on February 3, 2002, he won another number one contenders tournament and defeated Thomas Blade for the wXw World Heavyweight Championship. He later vacated the title in July 2002. During his time as champion, he won the ACW International Championship from Aykut in May and in June he made his Ireland debut where he won the EWA World Heavyweight Championship. Raaber lost his ACW International Championship back to Aykut in September only to win it back in December, he lost the title to Mr. Natural Wonder in March 2003. As the EWA World Heavyweight Champion, Raaber wrestled throughout western Europe, making his debut in France. On December 14, 2004, Raaber lost the championship to Cannonball Grizzly but regained it on April 3, 2005. On April 2, 2006, Raaber won the ICW Italian Championship in a fatal four way but would lose it a month later to Kaio. In December, he would lose to Joe E. Legend in the semi-final of the EPW Iron Man Tournament and the next day would defeat him by DQ in a match for the EPW Heavyweight Championship. In August 2007, Raaber made his debut in Finland and took on Finland's top star, Starbuck and would retain his World Championship. In September, Raaber would win the Königsschlacht Battle Royal at the European Wrestling Association. On April 5, 2008, Raaber made it to the final of the King Of Kutenholz Tournament before losing to Karsten Kretschmer. In the spring of 2009, Raaber had to vacate the EWA World Heavyweight Championship when he signed a development contract with World Wrestling Entertainment.

Raaber returned to Europe in early 2010 and made a sudden impact the EWA Iron Man Cup 2010 on April 24. In November he would tour with American Wrestling Rampage. On April 9, 2011, Raaber won his fourth EWA World Heavyweight Championship when he defeated Tiny Iron for the vacant title. In October 2012, Raaber won the Catch Wrestling World Grand Prix by last defeating Nelson Frazier, Jr.

=== America ===
As he was wrestling throughout Europe and he met with Ian Rotten during one of their shows in Germany then started training the American style of wrestling, Raaber was sent on a learning excursion to the United States where he enter the Funking Conservatory a professional wrestling school in Ocala, Florida, run by Dory Funk Jr. and became the FC International Champion. While in the US he appeared on World Championship Wrestling as part of R and B Security with James Storm, Cassidy O'Reilly and Chris Harris, although he didn't have any matches his memorable moment was being chokeslammed to a table by Scott Steiner on Nitro.

In 2007, Raaber participated in the Campeonato Internacional De Lucha Libre X-Trema CWS 2007 for Colombian Wrestling Superstars and made it to the final before losing a battle royal to Lloyd Anoaʻi.

In spring 2009 it was revealed that Raaber had signed a developmental contract with World Wrestling Entertainment and was sent to Florida Championship Wrestling. He made his debut on May 28, losing to Eric Escobar. Raaber changed his in-ring name to Christoph Herzog and made several FCW TV appearances before being released in late 2009.

=== Japan ===
Throughout Raaber's career, he has toured Japan on several occasions under the name Bambikiller for the most part. Raaber debuted for Pro Wrestling Zero1 in summer 2005 when he participated in the Fire Festival and gained four points, not enough for advancement. In 2006, Raaber became a representative member for an interpromotional company called Global Professional Wrestling Alliance which is run by the founder Mitsuharu Misawa and joined along with other wrestling organizations. On October 27, 2006, he lost the EWA World Heavyweight Championship to Takao Omori but would regain it on November 11. In October 2008, he participated in the Continent Confrontation Tournament. On July 11, 2010, Raaber defeated Kohei Sato to become the World Heavyweight Champion and would lose the title on September 9, 2010, to Daisuke Sekimoto. In 2012, Raaber participated in that years Real World Tag League, paired with Franz Dynamite and only managed to win one match. In November 2013, Bambi Killer came together with D'Lo Brown and Kenso to form the DK (Dark Kingdom) stable. Bambikiller faced New Japan Pro Wrestling star Hiroshi Tanahashi at GL1 Gloucester Leisure Centre Oct 4th in England for Superstars Of Wrestling.

== Championships and accomplishments ==
- Athletik Club Wrestling
  - ACW International Championship (2 times)
- Bullhead City Wrestling
  - Bullhead City Wrestling Championship (1 time)
- Catch Wrestling Europe
  - CWA World Heavyweight Championship (1 time, current)
- European Pro Wrestling
  - EPW Heavyweight Championship (1 time)
- European Wrestling Association
  - EWA World Heavyweight Championship (7 times, current)
  - Catch Wrestling World Grand Prix (2012)
  - Iron Man Cup (2010)
- Riotgas Wrestling Alliance
  - Battle Royal (2009)
- Federation Francaise de Catch Professional
  - FFCP Heavyweight Championship (1 time)
- Funking Conservatory
  - FC International Championship (1 time)
- Independent Wrestling World
  - WFU Rookie Championship Trophy
- Italian Championship Wrestling
  - ICW Italian Championship (1 time)
- Nigerian Pro-Wrestling Federation
  - BRF Intercontinental Championship (1 time)
- Power Of Wrestling
  - POW World Heavyweight Championship (2 times)
  - POW Catch Weltcup (2014)
- Power Wrestling Entertainment
  - PWE World Championship (1 time, inaugural)
  - PWE World Title Tournament (2012)
- Pro-Wrestling SUN
  - WDB Tag Team Championship (1 time) - with Saki Maemura
- Pro Wrestling Zero1
  - World Heavyweight Championship (1 time)
- Qatar Pro Wrestling
  - QPW Heavyweight Championship (1 time)
- Wawan Wrestling Championship
  - WWC Heavyweight Championship (1 time)
- Westside Xtreme Wrestling
  - wXw World Heavyweight Championship (1 time)
  - wXw #1-Contender Tournament (2001, 2002)
