= Joe Doering =

American professional wrestler (1982–2026)

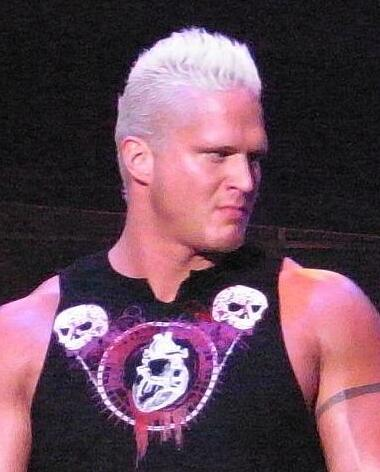
- Doering in 2009

Personal information
- Born: Joseph Doering; April 16, 1982 Chicago, Illinois, U.S.
- Died: June 26, 2026 (aged 44) Columbus, Ohio, U.S.

Professional wrestling career
- Ring names: Drake Brewer; Hans Von Doering; Joe Doering; Joseph Doering; Vaughn Doering; Von Doering
- Billed height: 6 ft 8 in (2.03 m)
- Billed weight: 276 lb (125 kg)
- Trained by: Scott D'Amore; Keiji Mutoh; Kaz Hayashi; Steve Keirn; Tom Prichard; Norman Smiley; Dusty Rhodes
- Debut: December 19, 2004
- Retired: August 30, 2022

Joseph Doering (April 16, 1982 – June 26, 2026) was an American professional wrestler. He was best known for his time in All Japan Pro Wrestling (AJPW) and Total Nonstop Action Wrestling/Impact Wrestling (TNA).

Doering started his career in 2004 and started to work with the Japanese promotion AJPW in 2007. During his first stint with the promotion, he won the World's Strongest Tag Determination League in 2007 with Keiji Muto and was part of Voodoo Murders stable. He also won the promotion's World Tag Team Championship with Muto. In 2010, he worked for 7 months for World Wrestling Entertainment as part of the developmental territory, Florida Championship Wrestling (FCW), under the ring name Drake Brewer. After leaving FCW, he returned to AJPW, where he worked for 9 years. During his second stint with AJPW, he won the World's Strongest Tag Determination League twice (in 2013 with Suwama and 2018 with Dylan James), the World Tag Team Championship three times and AJPW's top title, the Triple Crown Championship, twice. In 2020, Doering signed with American promotion TNA Wrestling, where he was part of the Violent By Design stable. He won the TNA World Tag Team Championship twice.

During his life, Doering battled brain tumors. The first one was diagnosed in 2016 and the second one in 2022, which caused his retirement from pro wrestling. He had a third brain tumor in 2025, and died in 2026.

== Professional wrestling career ==
=== Early career (2004–2007) ===
Doering was trained at the Can-Am Wrestling School/Total Nonstop Action Wrestling School in 2004. On December 19, 2004, Doering wrestled his first match for the Border City Wrestling (BCW), where he was defeated by D-Ray 3000.

=== World Wrestling Council (2006) ===
On April 28, 2006, Doering made his debut for the Puerto Rican promotion World Wrestling Council (WWC) under the ring name Hans von Doering and defeated Fire Blaze. Doering continued working for WWC until June 10.

=== All Japan Pro Wrestling (2007–2010) ===
Doering debuted for All Japan Pro Wrestling on June 24, 2007. After finishing the studying abroad period, All Japan rewarded Joe Doering with a gaijin contract in September 2007, and Doering became a member of the main roster. His first feud would be with Suwama, whom he pinned on October 18, 2007. Suwama swore revenge on Doering, but was once again pinned by him in the opening match of the 2007 World's Strongest Tag Determination League, where Doering teamed with Japanese legend Keiji Mutoh and Suwama with Satoshi Kojima. The teams would meet again in the finals of the same tournament and this time Mutoh pinned Suwama to win the tournament. On January 3, 2008, Doering and Mutoh defeated Kojima and TARU to win the World Tag Team Championship. However, due to Mutoh's busy schedule the team did not make any defenses, before losing the titles on June 28 to GURENTAI's Taiyō Kea and Minoru Suzuki.

Doering's next feud would be with Zodiac, whom he defeated on May 25, 2008, in a Hair vs. mask match. On October 28, 2008, Doering turned heel and joined the Voodoo Murders, where he would form a tag team with former rival Zodiac. The team entered the 2008 World's Strongest Tag Determination League, where they finished third.

In January 2010, it was reported that Doering had signed a developmental contract with World Wrestling Entertainment (WWE). In his final match with All Japan, he failed to claim the Triple Crown Heavyweight Championship from Satoshi Kojima.

=== World Wrestling Entertainment (2010) ===
On February 25, 2010, Doering made his debut in Florida Championship Wrestling, WWE's developmental territory under his real name, where he lost to Johnny Prime. On March 18, he defeated Prime in a rematch under the ring name Drake Brewer. In September 2010 it was reported Doering had been released from his developmental contract.

=== Return to AJPW (2010–2019) ===
On November 5, 2010, Doering returned to All Japan Pro Wrestling and re–joined the Voodoo Murders, teaming with KENSO in a tag team match, where they were defeated by Suwama and Ryota Hama. On February 6, 2011, Doering and Kono defeated Akebono and Taiyō Kea to win the World Tag Team Championship. On June 3, 2011, in the aftermath of a backstage fight, which resulted in Nobukazu Hirai suffering a stroke, All Japan Pro Wrestling disbanded Voodoo Murders, suspended all of its Japanese members and vacated the World Tag Team Championship. Doering regained the title from Manabu Soya and Takao Omori on May 20, 2012, this time teaming with Seiya Sanada. Doering and Sanada lost the title back to Soya and Omori on June 17. Doering then reunited with the returning Zodiac, however, after the two failed to regain the World Tag Team Championship from Soya and Omori on September 8, Doering ended the short-lived partnership by turning on Zodiac. On November 13, Suwama announced that he and Doering had decided to form a new partnership named "Last Revolution". Later in the month, Last Revolution made it to the finals of the 2012 World's Strongest Tag Determination League, before losing to the team of Manabu Soya and Takao Omori. In early 2013, Last Revolution was joined by Kaz Hayashi, Shuji Kondo and Yasufumi Nakanoue. However, when Hayashi and Kondo announced in June 2013 that they were resigning from All Japan, Doering announced that Last Revolution could no longer continue and would be disbanding following June 30. However, after defeating Suwama, the reigning Triple Crown Heavyweight Champion, in a non-title singles match on September 15, Doering and he decided to come back together and go for the World Tag Team Championship, renaming their team "Evolution". On October 22, Evolution defeated Burning (Go Shiozaki and Jun Akiyama) to win the World Tag Team Championship. As a result of pinning Akebono in a tag team match, Doering earned himself a shot at his Triple Crown Heavyweight Championship, but was defeated in the title match on November 24. On December 8, Evolution defeated Xceed (Go Shiozaki and Kento Miyahara) in the finals to win the 2013 World's Strongest Tag Determination League. On February 16, 2014, Hikaru Sato joined Doering and Suwama, turning Evolution into a stable. On June 28, Doering and Suwama lost the World Tag Team Championship to Wild Burning (Jun Akiyama and Takao Omori). On July 27, Doering defeated Suwama to win the Triple Crown Heavyweight Championship for the first time, becoming only the sixth non-Japanese holder of the title. On August 30, Doering made his first successful defense of the title against former champion Akebono. Doering's second defense took place on October 18 at a Border City Wrestling (BCW) event in Windsor, Ontario, where he defeated Rhino. This marked the first time the title was defended outside Japan. Doering made his third successful defense on October 29 against the winner of the 2014 Ōdō Tournament, Go Shiozaki. Doering lost his title to Shiozaki in a rematch on January 3, 2015.

Doering was scheduled to return to All Japan at the 2016 Champion Carnival, but was forced to pull out of the tournament after being diagnosed with a brain tumor. On November 27, Doering made an appearance at All Japan's show in Ryōgoku Kokugikan, announcing he would return to the ring in January 2017. His return match took place on January 2, when he, Hikaru Sato and Suwama defeated Jake Lee, Kento Miyahara and Naoya Nomura in a six-man tag team match. In April, Doering made it to the finals of the 2017 Champion Carnival, before losing to Shuji Ishikawa. On July 30, Doering quit Evolution. On October 21, Doering defeated former Evolution partner Suwama to win the Triple Crown Heavyweight Championship for the second time. he would lose it to Kento Miyahara on March 25, 2018.

=== Total Nonstop Action Wrestling/Impact Wrestling (2005–2022) ===
==== Early appearances (2005–2006, 2018) ====
On December 12, 2005, Joe Doering competed during the free preview show of Total Nonstop Action Wrestling (TNA)'s Turning Point pay-per-view, where he, Buck Quartermain and Jon Bolen lost to Lance Hoyt and The Naturals (Andy Douglas and Chase Stevens) in a six-man tag-team match. On the December 17 edition of TNA Impact!, which was taped four days earlier, Doering lost to Rhino. On the September 28, 2006, edition of Impact!, taped three days prior, Doering, under the ring name Vaughn Doring, made his final TNA appearance in a tag team match, where he and Brandon Thomaselli were defeated by Team 3D (Brother Ray and Brother Devon).

On March 16, 2018, Doering returned to Impact for the first time in 12 years at One Night Only: March Breakdown, where he defeated Moose.

==== Violent By Design (2020–2022) ====
On November 14, 2020, Doering made a surprise return to Impact Wrestling, formerly known as TNA, at Turning Point, where he aided Eric Young in beating up The Deaners. During the broadcast and the following weeks, there was no mention of Doering's prior history with Impact Wrestling (formerly TNA). On the November 17 edition of Impact!, Doering made his official in ring debut defeating Suicide in a squash match. Soon after, the duo of Doering and Young began a short-lived feud with The Deaners claiming that they need to be "cleansed of their sickness". At Final Resolution, Doering and Young coerced Cody Deaner to turn on his partner and align himself with them instead. After this, Doering, Deaner and Young became a trio while later adopting the name Violent By Design (VBD). On January 16, 2021, Doering made his Impact PPV debut teaming with his Violent by Design stablemates as they defeated Rhino, Tommy Dreamer, and Cousin Jake at Hard to Kill. On the May 20, 2021, episode of Impact Wrestling, Doering and Rhino defeated FinJuice (David Finlay and Juice Robinson) to win the Impact World Tag Team Championship. At Slammiversary, Violent By Design (Doering and Rhino) lost the titles to The Good Brothers (Doc Gallows and Karl Anderson).

At Sacrifice, Doering and Young defeated The Good Brothers (Doc Gallows and Karl Anderson) to win the Impact World Tag Team Championship. At Under Siege, Violent By Design lost the titles to The Briscoes (Jay Briscoe and Mark Briscoe).

On July 1, 2022, Doering would receive his first Impact World Championship match against Josh Alexander at Against All Odds, however he would fail to win the title, thus ending his undefeated streak in Impact Wrestling. The following month, Doering stepped away from the promotion to undergo brain surgery.

Doering's last match in TNA took place on the August 25, 2022, episode of Impact Wrestling, Violent By Design (Doering, Deaner and Eric Young) lost to Time Machine (Chris Sabin, Kushida and Alex Shelley).

=== Other promotions (2007–2022) ===
On March 20, 2007, Doering made his debut for Juggalo Championship Wrestling, where he teamed with Conrad Kennedy III and was defeated by Necro Butcher and Zach Gowen. On November 8, 2013, Doering made his debut for Dubai Wrestling Entertainment, where he was defeated by Behnam Ali. On January 17, 2014, Doering debuted in European Wrestling Association, where he defeated Dragon Okic. On May 9, 2014, Doering made his return for Border City Wrestling, where he teamed with Jon Bolen and defeated Hiroshi Tanahashi and Takaaki Watanabe.

Doering's last match was on the August 21, 2022, when he defeated 1 Called Manders at Wrestling Revolver's Sunday FunBey at Calumet Center in Dayton, Ohio.

== Personal life and death ==
Joseph Doering was born in Chicago, Illinois on April 16, 1982.

On February 25, 2016, Doering was diagnosed with a brain tumor. He underwent surgery to remove it on March 4. Doering underwent a second surgery after the disease returned in August 2022. He developed ataxia after the second surgery, which negatively impacted his mobility.

Doering's sister-in-law announced in November 2025 that he was diagnosed with a third brain tumor and he entered hospice care on June 23, 2026. He died three days later, on June 26, at the age of 44. His death was announced publicly that day by Scott D'Amore, and he was mourned by various figures throughout the professional wrestling industry, including Josh Alexander, as well as the official social media accounts of TNA and All Elite Wrestling. TNA also honored him during the Slammiversary event. AJPW also paid tribute to Doering on the July 19 event. Scott D'Amore announced a Celebration of Life event taking place on September 20, 2026.

== Championships and accomplishments ==
- All Japan Pro Wrestling
  - Triple Crown Heavyweight Championship (2 times)
  - World Tag Team Championship (4 times) – with Keiji Mutoh (1), Kono (1), Seiya Sanada (1) and Suwama (1)
  - World's Strongest Tag Determination League (2007) – with Keiji Mutoh
  - World's Strongest Tag Determination League (2013) – with Suwama
  - World's Strongest Tag Determination League (2018) – with Dylan James
- European Wrestling Association
  - EWA World Heavyweight Championship (1 time)
- Impact Wrestling / Total Nonstop Action Wrestling
  - Impact World Tag Team Championship (2 times) – with Eric Young, Rhino, and Deaner (1), Eric Young and Deaner (1)
- Power of Wrestling
  - Catch Weltcup (2019)
- Pro Wrestling Illustrated
  - Ranked No. 64 of the top 500 singles wrestlers in the PWI 500 in 2014 and 2018

=== Lucha de Apuestas record ===
| Winner (wager) | Loser (wager) | Event | Location | Date | Notes |
|---|---|---|---|---|---|
| Joe Doering (mask) | Zodiac (hair) | Rise Up Tour; Night 12 | Kobe, Hyōgo, Japan | May 25, 2008 | This was an All-Japan Pro Wrestling event. |
