= Wild Burning =

Professional wrestling tag team

Tag team
- Members: Jun Akiyama; Takao Omori
- Billed heights: 1.90 m (6 ft 3 in)- Omori; 1.88 m (6 ft 2 in)-Akiyama
- Combined billed weight: 220 kg (490 lb)
- Debut: March 25, 1993

Wild Burning is a tag team composed of Japanese professional wrestlers Jun Akiyama and Takao Omori. Although Akiyama and Omori have been using the team name since 2013, their team goes back almost to the era of their debut in All Japan Pro Wrestling in the early 1990s. The name is a portmanteau of their previous stables Burning (Akiyama) and Get Wild (Omori).

== History ==
=== First era: All Japan under Giant Baba (1993–1998) ===
Akiyama and Omori's first match as a team happened on 25 March 1993, defeating Masao Inoue and Satoru Asako. One year from that date, they started teaming regularly. Their first championship was earned on 29 January 1995, defeating The Fantastics in a tournament final for the vacant All Asia Tag Team Championship, a reign that would go on to 1076 days.

Despite his team with Omori, Akiyama's talent ensured that promoter Giant Baba would lead him into pushes by teaming with established stars, namely Mitsuharu Misawa and Kenta Kobashi. While holding the Asia tag team title, Akiyama would team with Misawa to win the World title on 23 May 1996. After Akiyama & Misawa dropped the title a few months later, Akiyama went back to defending the Asia tag title with Omori until they dropped it on 9 January 1998 to Johnny Smith and Wolf Hawkfield. Following this loss, Akiyama decided to focus on his team with Kobashi and the World tag team titles, while Omori briefly became a member of the Holy Demon Army team of Toshiaki Kawada and Akira Taue, until finally establishing a loyal partnership with Yoshihiro Takayama as No Fear. Despite that, they teamed on-and-off until 19 January 1999, when they teamed with Jinsei Shinzaki to beat Smith, Johnny Ace and Bart Gunn.

=== Various events (1999–2012) ===
As Akiyama and Omori found themselves on opposite sides of the spectrum following Giant Baba's death and Mitsuharu Misawa taking control of the promotion, they could only team on and off and often in six-man matches. The last time they were part of a team happened on 12 April 2000, when Akiyama teamed up with Omori and Yoshihiro Takayama to beat Misawa, Yoshinari Ogawa and Daisuke Ikeda, until the mass exodus to Pro Wrestling NOAH happened.

On 19 February 2012, at the 2nd All Together show, they teamed for the first time in 12 years, in a brave loss to Akiyama's former partner Kobashi and Keiji Mutoh. At the time, Omori was teaming with Manabu Soya in AJPW, where he had returned in 2011.

=== Reformation and name (2013–present) ===
Due to the split of the Wrestle-1 promotion under Mutoh, Soya abandoned Omori, and thus the stage was set for a regular re-formation of the former Asian tag team championship unit. On 28 June 2014, Wild Burning defeated Joe Doering and Suwama to win the long-elusive World Tag Team Championship. They vacated the title shortly before the 2014 World's Strongest Tag League and won the tournament, regaining the title.

Akiyama and Omori remain allied as Wild Burning but have competed against each other in singles matches, namely during the Champion Carnival 2000 and in the 2014 decision match for the vacant Triple Crown Heavyweight Championship.

== Championships and accomplishments ==
- All Japan Pro Wrestling
  - All Asia Tag Team Championship (1 time)
  - World Tag Team Championship (3 times)
  - World's Strongest Tag Determination League (2014)
