= Suwama =

Japanese professional wrestler (born 1976)

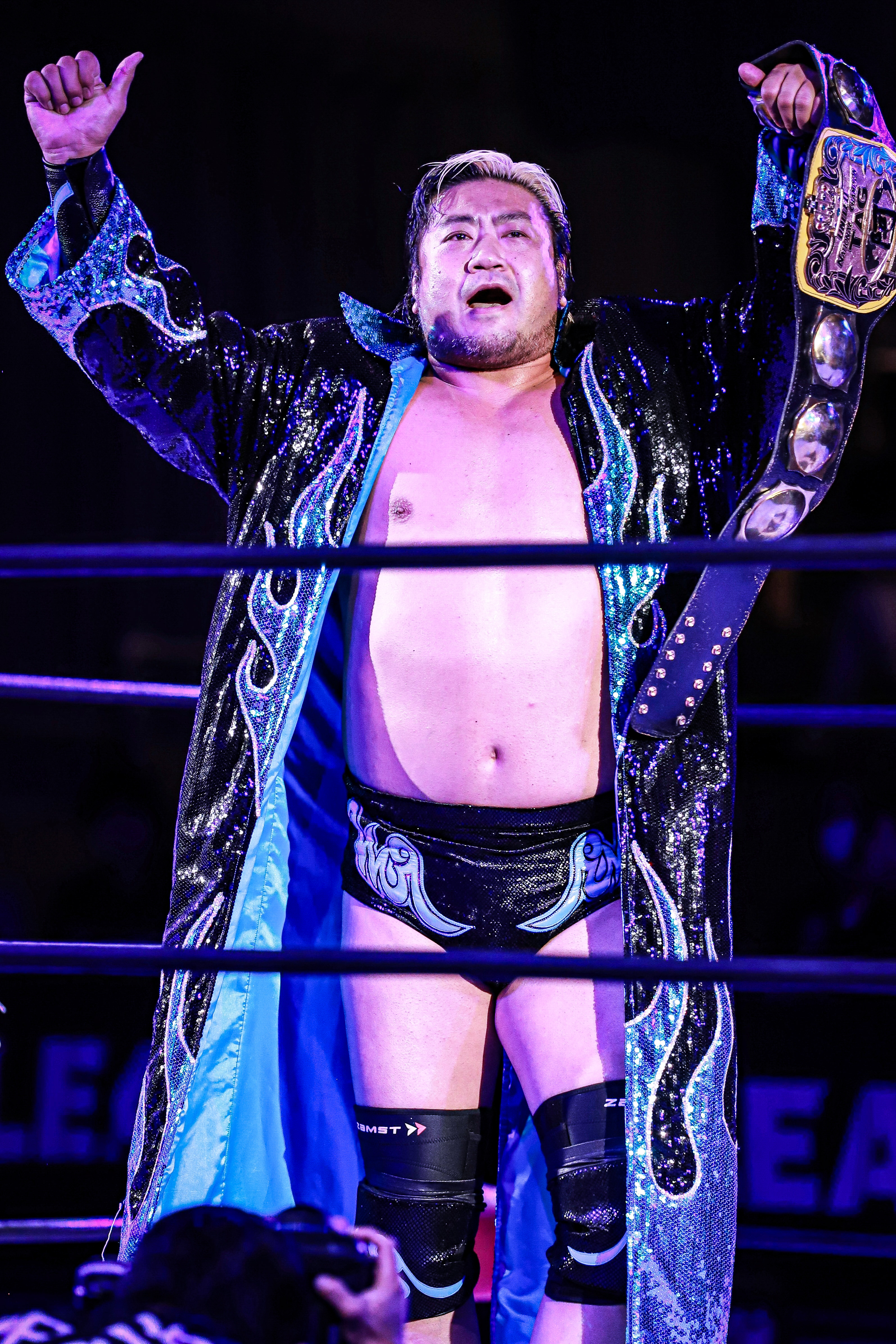
- Suwama in August 2023

Personal information
- Born: Kohei Suwama; November 23, 1976 (age 49) Fujisawa, Kanagawa, Japan

Professional wrestling career
- Ring name(s): Kohei Suwama; Suwama
- Billed height: 1.88 m (6 ft 2 in)
- Billed weight: 120 kg (265 lb)
- Trained by: AJPW Dojo; Hiroshi Hase; Kaz Hayashi
- Debut: October 11, 2004

Kohei Suwama (諏訪間 幸平, Suwama Kōhei; born November 23, 1976), also known mononymously as Suwama (諏訪魔, Suwa Ma; literally translated to "Suwa Evil Spirit"), is a Japanese professional wrestler and executive. He is the founder and president of Pro Wrestling Evolution, which was created in 2023. He is also signed to All Japan Pro Wrestling, where he is a former record eight-time Triple Crown Heavyweight Champion and an eight-time World Tag Team Champion. He was also part of AJPW's board of directors until his departure in early 2025 to focus on Evolution.

Debuting in 2004 at the age of 27 under Hiroshi Hase and Kaz Hayashi in the AJPW Dojo, Suwama was seen as the spiritual successor to then-president Keiji Muto, until he turned on him in 2006 to join Voodoo Murders (VDM). Upon dropping his first name and joining VDM, he teamed with both leader Taru and Satoshi Kojima on numerous occasions. He left VDM in 2008 to represent AJPW, and, after winning the Champion Carnival that year, won his first Triple Crown title against Osamu Nishimura.

In the years following his first Triple Crown title, he rose to become the legitimate ace of the promotion, winning multiple more Triple Crown and Tag championships. His meteoric rise led to him becoming known in AJPW as both The Emperor and the Next Jumbo. He founded the Evolution stable, which was first known as Last Revolution, in 2012. Within this time, he had been quietly dropped as the ace of AJPW, being replaced by the younger Kento Miyahara. The rivalry between Suwama and Miyahara between 2016 and 2019, and again in 2022, was a pivotal point in AJPW's successes in the mid-to-late 2010s. He formed the Violent Giants (暴走大巨人, Bōsō Dai Kyojin; Japanese for "Runaway Giants") with former DDT and BJW star Shuji Ishikawa; they won four World Tag Team titles and three consecutive Tokyo Sports Best Tag Team Awards between 2017 and 2019 during their run as a tag team.

He won the 2016 and 2017 Ōdō Tournaments, and won three World's Strongest Tag Determination Leagues (once with Joe Doering, once with Miyahara, and once with Ishikawa). Since 2008, he has won eight Triple Crown titles and eight World Tag Team titles, becoming one of the winniest competitors in AJPW, surpassing even Mitsuharu Misawa and Toshiaki Kawada for championships combined.

== Professional wrestling career ==
=== All Japan Pro Wrestling ===
==== Early days (2004–2006) ====
Suwama was scouted and recruited to All Japan Pro Wrestling (AJPW) by Hiroshi Hase, particularly because of his amateur wrestling background. He joined the All Japan dojo on March 1, 2004, and teamed with AJPW president Keiji Muto early in his career, defeating many of his seniors. In 2005, he defeated Muto in the 2005 Champion Carnival.

==== Voodoo Murders (2006–2008) ====
Suwama aligned himself with the Voodoo Murders stable on January 8, 2006, following a Triple Crown Heavyweight Championship match between Satoshi Kojima and stable leader Taru. Upon joining the group, he officially changed his name mononymously to Suwama (諏訪魔, Suwa Ma), which translates to "Suwa Evil Spirit".

He formed a team with RO'Z in early 2007, as the two set their sights on the vacant World Tag Team Championship. Their pursuit would be unsuccessful, as Toshiaki Kawada and Taiyō Kea defeated them in a decision match for the vacant belts on February 17, 2007. Suwama was sent by the group to Orlando, Florida on July 2, 2007, in order to secure Total Nonstop Action Wrestling star Scott Steiner for All Japan's Pro Wrestling Love in Ryogoku, Vol. 3 event in Sumo Hall on August 26, 2007. Suwama had observed Steiner's match and shortly afterwards came to an agreement with Steiner to team with him and challenge the team of The Great Muta and Tajiri. They were unsuccessful in the challenge.

For the rest of the year, Suwama mainly competed in six-man tags with Taru and Satoshi Kojima (who joined the group in July), but also had a short feud with rookie gaijin Joe Doering. Suwama teamed with Kojima in the 2008 World's Strongest Tag Determination League, where they defeated Toshiaki Kawada and Kensuke Sasaki to reach the finals, but lost to Keiji Mutoh and Joe Doering. Suwama and Kojima scored 10 points.

==== Rise of the Human Weapon (2008–2011) ====
At All Japan's New Year's Shining Series show on January 3, 2008, Suwama saved Keiji Mutoh and Joe Doering from a post-match attack by the Voodoo Murders stable. After Suwama tore off his Voodoo Murders shirt, he shook hands with Mutoh and signaled his return to the All Japan Seikigun. On March 1, 2008, Suwama defeated Taru at Pro Wrestling Love in Ryogoku, Vol. 4. From April 5–9, Suwama participated in All Japan's annual Champion Carnival tournament, which he ultimately won on April 9 by defeating New Japan Pro-Wrestling (NJPW) star Hiroshi Tanahashi in the finals. Suwama finished the Carnival group stage with 2 wins, 1 loss and 1 draw, which earned him 5 points. On April 29, 2008, Suwama defeated Kensuke Sasaki to win the All Japan Triple Crown Championship.

Suwama first defended the Triple Crown on June 28, 2008, against Osamu Nishimura, beating Nishimura with the Last Ride. Suwama challenged Taiyo Kea and Minoru Suzuki on August 3, 2008 for the World Tag Team Championship teaming with Osamu Nishimura but did not win the belts. Suwama's second defense of the Triple crown was on August 31, 2008 versus Taiyo Kea it went to a 60-minute time limit draw. Suwama team up with Ryuji Hijikata in the All Asia Tag Team Championship tournament on January 2–3, 2009 to crown new All Asia Tag Team Champions. Suwama and Hijikata got eliminated in the first round of the tournament by losing to Satoshi Kojima and Kai when Kojima used a lariat on Hijikata. Suwama and Shuji Kondo defeated Joe Doering and Zodiac on March 1, 2009, to become the number one contenders for the World Tag Team Championship, but did not win the championship from Taiyō Kea and Minoru Suzuki. On August 29, 2010, Suwama defeated Minoru Suzuki to win the Triple Crown Heavyweight Championship for the second time. He would go on to lose the title to Jun Akiyama on October 23, 2011.

==== Ace of AJPW (2012–2016) ====
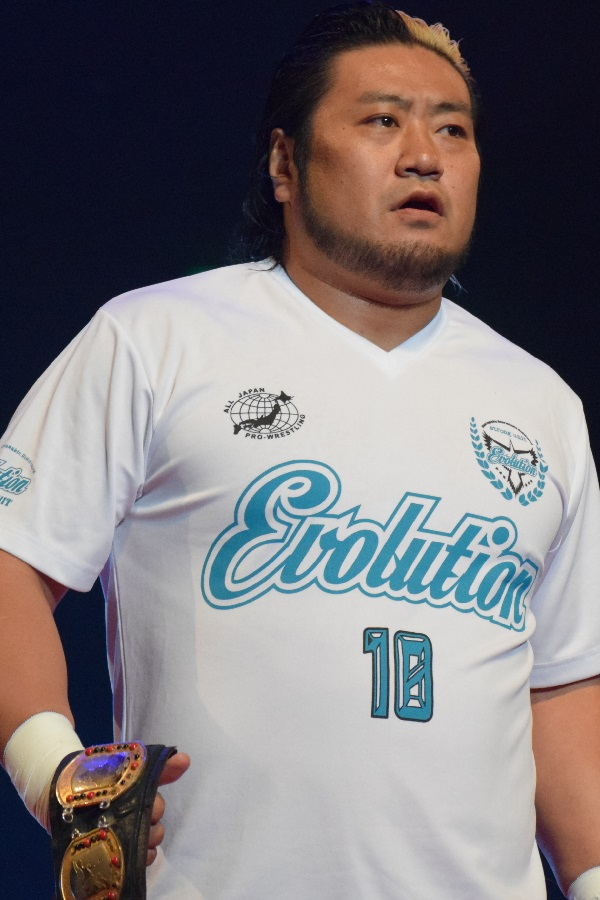
Suwama wearing a t-shirt with the logo of Evolution, the unit he has led since 2013

In later 2012, Suwama formed the Last Revolution tag team with Joe Doering, which in early 2013 was also joined by Kaz Hayashi, Shuji Kondo and Yasufumi Nakanoue. On March 17, Suwama defeated Masakatsu Funaki to win the Triple Crown Heavyweight Championship for the third time. In June, Joe Doering disbanded Last Revolution, when Kaz Hayashi and Shuji Kondo announced their resignation from All Japan following Nobuo Shiraishi taking over as the new president of All Japan and Keiji Mutoh leaving the promotion. While several other wrestlers also quit All Japan following the change in management, Suwama emerged as one of the first wrestlers to publicly show his support to Shiraishi, announcing that he was going to be staying in the promotion. In September, Suwama came back together with Joe Doering, with the two forming a tag team named "Evolution". On October 22, Evolution defeated Burning (Go Shiozaki and Jun Akiyama) to win the World Tag Team Championship, making Suwama the first "Quintuple Crown Champion" in 12 years. However, just five days later, Suwama lost the Triple Crown Heavyweight Championship to Akebono. On December 8, Evolution defeated Xceed (Go Shiozaki and Kento Miyahara) in the finals to win the 2013 World's Strongest Tag Determination League. On February 16, 2014, Hikaru Sato joined Suwama and Doering, turning Evolution into a stable. On June 28, Suwama and Doering lost the World Tag Team Championship to Wild Burning (Jun Akiyama and Takao Omori). However, the next day, Suwama defeated Omori to win the Triple Crown Heavyweight Championship for the fourth time. That same day Suwama was made a part of All Japan's new board of directors. He was later also given the title of "senior managing director". On July 27, Suwama lost the Triple Crown Heavyweight Championship to his Evolution stablemate Joe Doering. In December 2015, Suwama resigned from his senior managing director role. On January 2, 2016, Suwama defeated Jun Akiyama to win the Triple Crown Heavyweight Championship for the fifth time. However, Suwama was stripped of the title only ten days later after suffering an achilles tendon rupture.

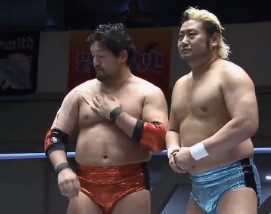
Violent Giants in 2019 (Shuji Ishikawa on the left, Suwama on the right)

Suwama returned to the ring on July 14, 2016. On September 19, Suwama defeated Zeus in the finals to win the 2016 Ōdō Tournament. Suwama would then unsuccessfully challenge the Triple Crown Heavyweight Champion Kento Miyahara on November 27. On September 23, 2017, Suwama won his second Ōdō Tournament in a row. On October 9, Suwama defeated Miyahara to win the Triple Crown for a record sixth time. He lost the title to Joe Doering on October 21.

==== Violent Giants (2017-2020) ====
On November 19, Suwama allied with Shuji Ishikawa to enter the World's Strongest Tag Determination League, which the two won by defeating Daichi Hashimoto and Hideyoshi Kamitani in the finals. They coined themselves as the Violent Giants (暴走大巨人, Bōsō Dai Kyojin; Japanese for "Runaway Giants") afterward. On January 3, 2018, the two won the World Tag Team Championship by defeating Wild Burning (Takao Omori and Jun Akiyama). They dropped the belts to Kento Miyahara and Yoshi Tatsu on February 3. Between April 7 and April 30, Suwama took part in the Champion Carnival, winning four matches and losing three. He was unable to reach the finals, but scored an important victory against eventual winner Naomichi Marufuji.

== Personal life ==
Kohei Suwama is the father of Japanese footballer, Kosei Suwama.

Kosei currently plays for Yokohama F. Marinos, having graduated from Tsukuba University, the same university paved path of post-college professional career for Japan National Football Team players such as Kaoru Mitoma and Shogo Taniguchi, and previously a member of Marinos youth team.

== Championships and accomplishments ==
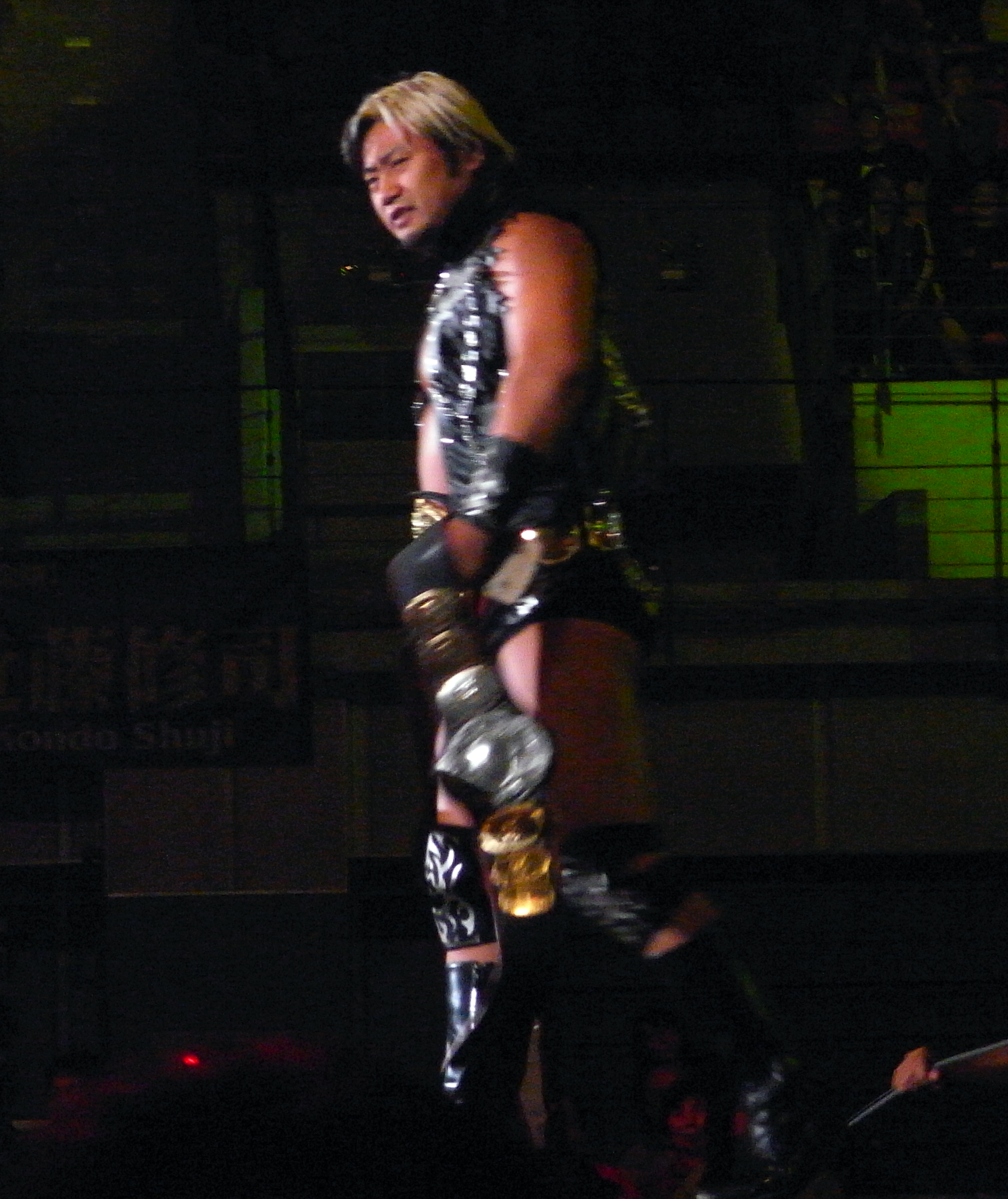
Suwama is an eight-time Triple Crown Heavyweight Champion

- All Japan Pro Wrestling
  - Triple Crown Heavyweight Championship (8 times)
  - World Tag Team Championship (8 times) – with Joe Doering (1), Shuji Ishikawa (4), Shotaro Ashino (1), Kono (1) and Hideki Suzuki (1)
  - AJPW TV Six-Man Tag Team Championship (2 times) – with Mayumi Ozaki and Maya Yukihi (1), Dan Tamura and Hideki Suzuki (1)
  - Champion Carnival (2008)
  - January 2 Korakuen Hall Heavyweight Battle Royal (2005)
  - Mika Kayama Cup (2010) – with Shuji Kondo
  - Ōdō Tournament (2016, 2017, 2021)
  - Taiwan Cup (2009)
  - World's Strongest Tag Determination League (2013) – with Joe Doering
  - World's Strongest Tag Determination League (2015) – with Kento Miyahara
  - World's Strongest Tag Determination League (2017, 2019) – with Shuji Ishikawa
- Nikkan Sports
  - Best Bout (2011) – vs. Jun Akiyama on October 23
- Pro Wrestling Illustrated
  - Ranked No. 14 of the best 500 singles wrestlers in the PWI 500 in 2011
- Tenryu Project
  - Tenryu Project United National Heavyweight Tag Team Championship (1 time) – with Dan Tamura
  - Tenryu Project World 6-Man Tag Team Championship (1 time) – with Arashi and Tomohiro Ishii
- Tokyo Sports
  - Outstanding Performance Award (2010)
  - Tag Team of the Year (2006) with Taru, Shuji Kondo, and "brother" Yasshi
  - Tag Team of the Year (2017, 2018, 2019) with Shuji Ishikawa
