= Takao Omori =

Japanese professional wrestler (born 1969)

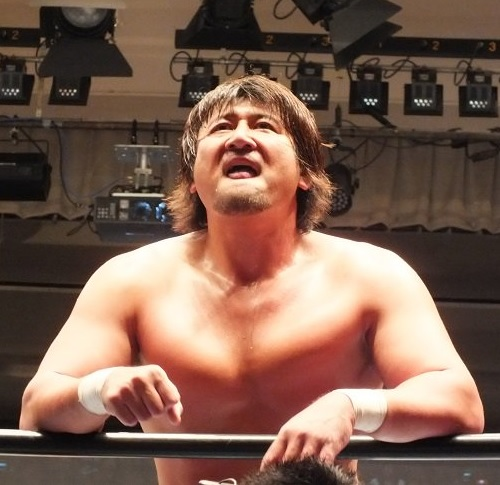
- Omori in November 2012

Personal information
- Born: October 16, 1969 (age 57) Tokyo, Japan

Professional wrestling career
- Ring name: Takao Omori
- Billed height: 1.91 m (6 ft 3 in)
- Billed weight: 110 kg (243 lb)
- Trained by: Animal Hamaguchi
- Debut: October 16, 1992

Takao Omori (大森隆男, Ōmori Takao; born October 16, 1969) is a Japanese professional wrestler, working for All Japan Pro Wrestling (AJPW), where he is a one-time Triple Crown Heavyweight Champion and seven-time World Tag Team Champion. He is also part of the All Japan Board of Directors. He has worked in New Japan Pro-Wrestling (NJPW), Pro Wrestling Noah (Noah) and Pro Wrestling Zero1 (Zero1).

== Professional wrestling career ==
=== All Japan Pro Wrestling (1992–2000) ===
After being trained by Animal Hamaguchi, Omori debuted in All Japan Pro Wrestling, initially languishing in the mid-card as most rookies in the company do when they debut, Omori would get his first big break in 1995, when he and Jun Akiyama captured the All Asia Tag Team Championship. Omori and Akiyama would hold the Championships for 1,076 days with 12 successful defenses, before losing the Championships to Johnny Smith and Wolf Hawkfield. In 1998, he and newcomer Yoshihiro Takayama formed the NO FEAR tag team. The team soon won both the All Asia Tag Team Championship and the World Tag Team Championship, becoming the first team to win both titles at the same time. In late 1999, former Super Generation Army member Satoru Asako would join the group and would often compete alongside them in Six Man Tag matches. Hiroshi Hase, Masanobu Fuchi, Takeshi Morishima and Gary Albright would also support the team at times but weren't full fledged members. In 2000, Omori would make it to the finals of that year's Champion Carnival after beating Jun Akiyama, Mike Barton and Steve Williams in the first 3 rounds. In the finals he'd be defeated by Kenta Kobashi in 25 minutes and 12 seconds. Later on in 2000, AJPW's top star and former president Mitsuharu Misawa would form Pro Wrestling Noah. Omori, Takayama and Asako followed him and dyed their hair blond to match the change of environment.

Omori's first American venture was in the World Wrestling Federation, where he competed in the 1996 Royal Rumble. He was eliminated by the returning Jake Roberts.

=== Pro Wrestling Noah and other promotions (2000–2004) ===
Omori would begin his career in Pro Wrestling NOAH largely competing in Tag Team and Six Man Tag Team matches alongside fellow NO FEAR stablemates Yoshihiro Takayama and Satoru Asako. However he would still compete in singles matches, often winning. However, for an undisclosed reason, Omori called for an early ending to his singles bout with Shinya Hashimoto in the middle of their singles match at Noah's Great Voyage 2000 event, which was the company's most important event up to that point. Because of this, Omori was immediately in Misawa's doghouse for a time. However, after this he and Takayama would defeat Mitsuharu Misawa and Yoshinari Ogawa to capture the GHC Tag Team Championships at Pro Wrestling NOAH's Navigation In Raging Ocean tour in 2001. They would hold the titles for 70 days before losing them to Takeshi Rikio and Takeshi Morishima. The members of NO FEAR would still continue to have success in NOAH, winning a majority of their Tag Team and Six Man Tag matches as a stable. In 2002 the NO FEAR team broke up following a betrayal from Omori over Takayama as well as Asako's premature retirement due to a career ending neck injury. Omori was then sent abroad to Harley Race's World League Wrestling promotion in the American Midwest, where he won the company's heavyweight title. During his excursion, Misawa continued to deny that Omori had been sent abroad by Noah, and Omori was not welcomed back to Noah when he returned from the excursion. As a result, Omori joined Fighting World of Japan Pro Wrestling, where he feuded with Riki Choshu, Genichiro Tenryu and Kensuke Sasaki.

In 2011, Omori would compete at a Pro Wrestling NOAH related event again for the first time in 9 years when he and NO FEAR stablemate Yoshihiro Takayama would wrestle at AJPW/NJPW/NOAH All Together There they would face Kensuke Sasaki and Omori's longtime rival and partner Jun Akiyama in a losing effort. He would return for the next year's All Together event when he would team with Jun Akiyama against Kenta Kobashi and Keiji Muto in a losing effort. In 2013 Omori would compete at his first solo NOAH event in 11 years when he and Yoshihiro Takayama defeated Naomichi Marufuji and Minoru Suzuki at Pro Wrestling NOAH's Final Burning in Budokan event, which commemorated the retirement of Kenta Kobashi. In 2018 Omori would return to NOAH again, teaming with Cody Hall in a winning effort against Quiet Storm and Tadasuke. This match took place at NOAH Naomichi Marufuji 20th Anniversary Show ~ Flight ~ which was an event commemorating the 20th anniversary of Naomichi Marufuji's Professional Wrestling career.

=== Pro Wrestling Zero1-Max (2004–2008) ===
In 2004, he joined Pro Wrestling ZERO1-MAX, where he was one of the strong native competitors along with (fellow Hamaguchi Dojo classmate) Shinjiro Otani. He has feuded with old team mate Yoshihiro Takayama, resulting in many bloody battles and disqualifications. On March 8, 2007, he and Manabu Nakanishi lost the ZERO1-MAX Intercontinental Tag Team Championship to Yoshihiro Takayama and Kohei Sato. On March 31, 2007, he defeated Steve Corino for the AWA Superstars of Wrestling World Heavyweight Championship, becoming a three-time champion. Nearly seven months to the day Omori won the AWA World Heavyweight championship, he would lose the title to Masato Tanaka. On August 16, 2008 Omori announced that he was leaving ZERO1-MAX and taking a break from pro wrestling.

=== New Japan Pro-Wrestling (2009–2010) ===
This break would not last long, as Omori appeared at a New Japan Pro-Wrestling show on March 15, 2009 to revive his team with Manabu Nakanishi. He also participated in the 2009 G1 Climax, pulling off two impressive victories in his first two matches by defeating both IWGP Heavyweight Champion Hiroshi Tanahashi and eventual tournament winner Togi Makabe. In January 2010 Omori announced his semi-retirement.

=== Freelancing (2010–2011; 2024 - Present) ===
Since semi-retiring, Omori had been wrestling select shows in various promotions, both mainstream and independent. In 2011, he has been wrestling semi-regularly with All Japan Pro Wrestling. Following the 2011 World's Strongest Tag Determination League, Omori appealed to Keiji Mutoh to officially join All Japan and Mutoh granted the request, officially rejoining All Japan.

In 2024, Omori would begin wrestling on a freelance basis more frequently. This would include matches in Japanese Independent promotions like Extreme Fighting Stage COMBO, Asian Pro Wrestling and Pro Wrestling KAGEKI. In 2025 after a 10 month hiatus he returned at New York based independent promotion Wrestling Is Now, where he was brought in as the main attraction for Wrestling Is Now: NO FEAR DAY. On the event he teamed up with Bull James and PJ Savage in a winning effort against Joel Maximo, Adrian Santos and Carlos Billetes of La Casa, the promotion's top heel stable. This was his first match in the United States since 2006.

=== Return to AJPW (2011–present) ===
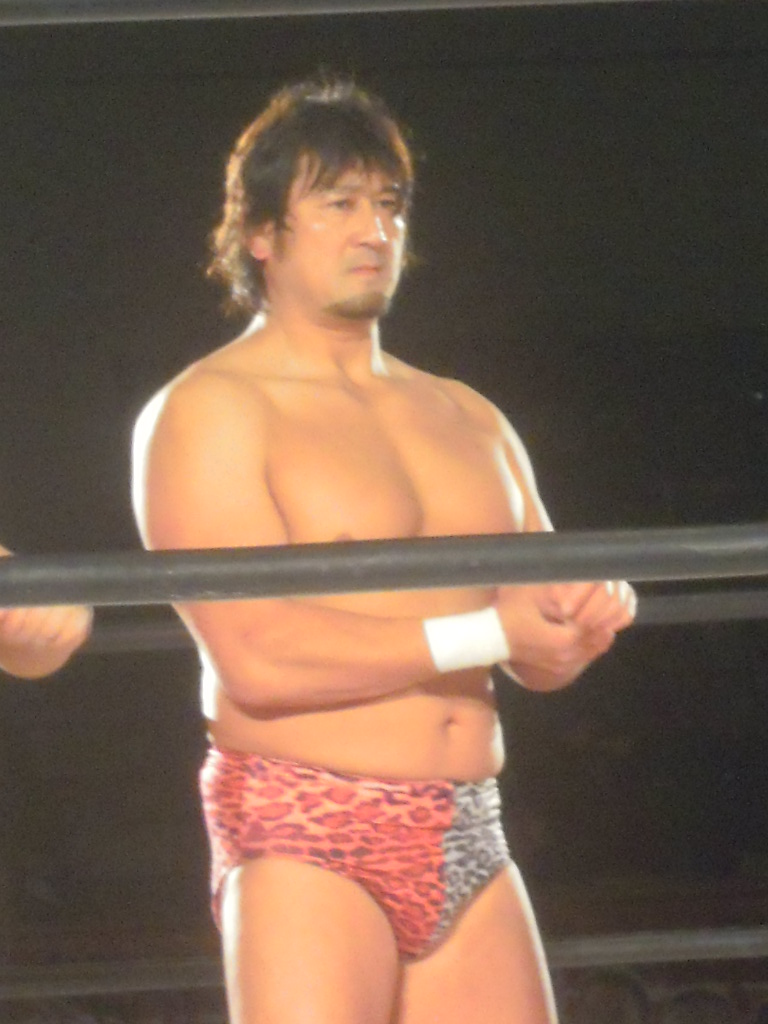
Omori in December 2012

Omori's first match back as an official member of the AJPW roster took place on December 25, 2011, teaming up with Manabu Soya and Seiya Sanada in a loss to Akebono, Keiji Mutoh, and Super Delfin. On March 20, 2012, Omori and Soya defeated Dark Cuervo and Dark Ozz for the World Tag Team Championship. After losing the title to Joe Doering and Seiya Sanada on May 20, Omori and Soya, known collectively as "Get Wild", regained the title on June 17. They vacated the title on October 30, in time for the 2012 World's Strongest Tag Determination League. On November 30, Get Wild won the tournament to regain the title. On December 11, Soya unsuccessfully challenged Masakatsu Funaki for the Triple Crown Heavyweight Championship. As a result, Get Wild was forced to disband, despite still holding the World Tag Team Championship. Get Wild went on to lose the title to Burning (Go Shiozaki and Jun Akiyama) on March 17, 2013. Following Soya's resignation from AJPW, Omori revived his team with Akiyama, naming it "Wild Burning" in January 2014. On February 8, Wild Burning unsuccessfully challenged Evolution (Joe Doering and Suwama) for the World Tag Team Championship. On April 27, Omori won his first Champion Carnival, defeating Jun Akiyama in the finals. On June 15, Omori defeated Akiyama in a rematch to win the vacant Triple Crown Heavyweight Championship for the first time. On June 28, Omori became only the sixth "Quintuple Crown Champion" in All Japan history, when he and Akiyama defeated Joe Doering and Suwama to win the World Tag Team Championship. However, the next day, Omori lost the Triple Crown Heavyweight Championship to Suwama, ending his reign at just 14 days. After successfully defending the World Tag Team Championship against Akebono and Yutaka Yoshie on October 22, Omori and Akiyama vacated the title the following day in time for the 2014 World's Strongest Tag Determination League. They regained the title by winning the tournament on December 6, defeating Go Shiozaki and Kento Miyahara in the finals. Wild Burning's second reign ended on March 22, 2015, when they were defeated by Akebono and Yutaka Yoshie. On January 1, 2016, Omori was appointed to the All Japan Board of Directors. On December 18, the reunited Get Wild defeated Jake Lee and Kento Miyahara in the finals to win the 2016 World's Strongest Tag Determination League. Omori would continue to be a major presence in All Japan, winning several more Championships. In 2017, on a show dedicated to both his and Jun Akiyama's 25th anniversary as Professional Wrestlers, Omori and Akiyama would defeat Daisuke Sekimoto and Ryuji Ito for the vacant AJPW World Tag Team Championships, winning them one final time. In 2020 he would team with Black Menso-re and Carbell Ito to win the AJPW TV Six-Man Tag Team Championship. In 2022 he and fellow 1990s All Japan veteran Masao Inoue would capture the AJPW All Asia Tag Team Championship in a Four Way Tag Team Match also involving defending champions Seigo Tachibana and Yusuke Kodama, TAJIRI and Yoshi Tatsu, and Black Mensore and Carbell Ito. They'd hold the Championships for the rest of the year until the team of NOSAWA Rongai and Kendo Kashin defeated them for the titles at the following year's New Year Giant Series tour. In 2023 Omori would win his final championship to date when he, Black Mensore and Carbell Ito would win the AJPW TV Six-Man Tag Team Championship again. In 2024 Omori would appear for All Japan less frequently and would freelance on a more regular basis.

== Championships and accomplishments ==
- All Japan Pro Wrestling

- AJPW TV Six-Man Tag Team Championship (2 times, inaugural) – with Black Menso~re and Carbell Ito/ATM
- All Asia Tag Team Championship (3 times) – with Jun Akiyama (1), Yoshihiro Takayama (1) and Masao Inoue (1)
- Triple Crown Heavyweight Championship (1 time)
- World Tag Team Championship (7 times) – with Yoshihiro Takayama (1), Manabu Soya (3) and Jun Akiyama (3)
- F-1 Tag Team Championship (1 time) – with Kannazuki^{1}
- Asunaro Tag Team Cup (1998) – with Jun Akiyama
- Champion Carnival (2014)
- January 2 Korakuen Hall Heavyweight Battle Royal (1997, 2014, 2017)
- World's Strongest Tag Determination League (2012, 2016) – with Manabu Soya
- World's Strongest Tag Determination League (2014) – with Jun Akiyama

- DDT Pro-Wrestling

- GAY World Anal Championship (1 time)

- European Wrestling Association

- EWA World Heavyweight Championship (1 time)

- New Japan Pro-Wrestling

- IWGP Tag Team Championship (1 time) – with Manabu Nakanishi
- Interim IWGP Tag Team Championship (1 time) – with Manabu Nakanishi

- Nikkan Sports

- Best Tag Team Award (2012) with Manabu Soya

- Pro Wrestling Illustrated

- Ranked No. 66 of the top 500 singles wrestlers in the PWI 500 in 2000

- Pro Wrestling Noah

- GHC Tag Team Championship (1 time) – with Yoshihiro Takayama

- Pro Wrestling Zero1-Max

- AWA World Heavyweight Championship (3 times)
- NWA Intercontinental Tag Team Championship (3 times)^{2} – with Shiro Koshinaka (1), Shinjiro Otani (1), and Manabu Nakanishi (1)
- NWA United National Heavyweight Championship (1 time)^{3}

- Tokyo Sports

- Best Tag Team Award (2012) – with Manabu Soya

- World League Wrestling

- WLW Heavyweight Championship (1 time)

^{1}Championship not officially recognized by All Japan Pro Wrestling.
^{2}Although the title still uses the NWA initials, it is not recognized or sanctioned by the National Wrestling Alliance since the promotion withdrew from the NWA in 2004.
^{3}This title shouldn't be confused with the NWA United National Championship, a defunct NWA singles championship that is currently one of the three championships used to comprise the Triple Crown Heavyweight Championship.
