= Triple Crown Heavyweight Championship =

Professional wrestling world championship

- Belt in use since October 2013.

Details
- Promotion: All Japan Pro Wrestling
- Date established: April 18, 1989
- Current champion: Kento Miyahara
- Date won: September 23, 2025

Other names
- PWF Triple Crown World Heavyweight Championship; AJPW Triple Crown Heavyweight Championship
Statistics
- First champion: Jumbo Tsuruta
- Most reigns: Suwama (8 reigns)
- Longest reign: Mitsuharu Misawa (705 days)
- Shortest reign: Terry Gordy (3 days)
- Oldest champion: Yuji Nagata (54 years, 9 months and 26 days)
- Youngest champion: Yuma Anzai (24 years, 10 months and 15 days)
- Heaviest champion: Akebono (210 kg (460 lb))
- Lightest champion: Katsuhiko Nakajima (87 kg (192 lb))

The Triple Crown Heavyweight Championship (三冠ヘビー級王座, Sankan Hebīkyū Ōza) is a professional wrestling world heavyweight championship in the Japanese All Japan Pro Wrestling promotion. The current champion is Kento Miyahara, who is in his seventh reign.

== Title history ==
The championship was established after the unification of All Japan's then-flagship title, the PWF World Heavyweight Championship, with the NWA United National Championship and the NWA International Heavyweight Championship. The titles were unified on April 18, 1989, when NWA International Heavyweight Champion Jumbo Tsuruta defeated the PWF World Heavyweight and NWA United National Champion Stan Hansen.

Unlike most unified championships, the Triple Crown was originally represented through the continued use of the three individual championship belts. From 1989 to 2000, the holder of the Triple Crown was also presented by Nippon TV (AJPW's broadcaster at the time) with a large, globe-shaped trophy bearing the words "World Heavyweight Champion". The original title belts were returned to All Japan founder Giant Baba's widow Motoko in August 2013 and a new single title belt incorporating designs from the three original belts was made. The new title belt, which featured three plates representing the three original title belts, was unveiled on October 27. One of the plates includes the text "Jumbo Tsuruta Apr. 18 1989", representing the crowning of the inaugural champion. There have been a total of 35 recognized champions who have had a combined 76 official reigns. Six men in history have held the championship for a continuous reign of one year (365 days) or more: Kento Miyahara (who have each achieved the feat thrice), Mitsuharu Misawa, Suwama (who have each achieved the feat twice), Jumbo Tsuruta, Satoshi Kojima and Toshiaki Kawada.

== Reigns ==
Key
No.	Overall reign number
Reign	Reign number for the specific champion
Days	Number of days held
Defenses	Number of successful defenses
+	Current reign is changing daily

No.	Champion	Championship change			Reign statistics			Notes	Ref.
No.	Champion	Date	Event	Location	Reign	Days	Defenses	Notes	Ref.
All Japan Pro Wrestling (AJPW)
1	Jumbo Tsuruta	April 18, 1989	Champion Carnival tour	Tokyo, Japan	1	48	1	Tsuruta, the NWA International Heavyweight Champion, defeated Stan Hansen, the PWF Heavyweight and NWA United National Champion, to unify the titles.	
2	Genichiro Tenryu	June 5, 1989	Super Power Series tour	Tokyo, Japan	1	128	2		
3	Jumbo Tsuruta	October 11, 1989	October Giant Series tour	Yokohama, Japan	2	237	2		
4	Terry Gordy	June 5, 1990	Super Power Series tour	Chiba, Japan	1	3	0		
5	Stan Hansen	June 8, 1990	Super Power Series tour	Tokyo, Japan	1	39	0		
6	Terry Gordy	July 17, 1990	Summer Action Series tour	Kanazawa, Japan	2	10	0		
—	Vacated	July 27, 1990	—	—	—	—	—	The title was vacated after Gordy was hospitalized during a scheduled title defense later that night.	
7	Stan Hansen	July 27, 1990	Summer Action Series tour	Matsudo, Japan	2	176	1	Defeated Mitsuharu Misawa to win the vacant title.	
8	Jumbo Tsuruta	January 19, 1991	New Year Giant Series tour	Matsumoto, Japan	3	374	3		
9	Stan Hansen	January 28, 1992	New Year Giant Series tour	Chiba, Japan	3	207	3		
10	Mitsuharu Misawa	August 22, 1992	Summer Action Series II tour	Tokyo, Japan	1	705	7		
11	Steve Williams	July 28, 1994	Summer Action Series tour	Tokyo, Japan	1	86	1		
12	Toshiaki Kawada	October 22, 1994	October Giant Series tour	Tokyo, Japan	1	133	1		
13	Stan Hansen	March 4, 1995	Excite Series tour	Tokyo, Japan	4	83	0		
14	Mitsuharu Misawa	May 26, 1995	Super Power Series tour	Sapporo, Japan	2	364	4		
15	Akira Taue	May 24, 1996	Super Power Series tour	Sapporo, Japan	1	61	1		
16	Kenta Kobashi	July 24, 1996	Super Power Series tour	Tokyo, Japan	1	180	2		
17	Mitsuharu Misawa	January 20, 1997	New Year Giant Series tour	Osaka, Japan	3	466	8		
18	Toshiaki Kawada	May 1, 1998	AJPW 25th Anniversary	Tokyo, Japan	2	42	0		
19	Kenta Kobashi	June 12, 1998	Super Power Series tour	Tokyo, Japan	2	141	2		
20	Mitsuharu Misawa	October 31, 1998	October Giant Series tour	Tokyo, Japan	4	83	0		
21	Toshiaki Kawada	January 22, 1999	New Year Giant Series tour	Osaka, Japan	3	7	0		
—	Vacated	January 29, 1999	—	—	—	—	—	Vacated after Kawada fractured his right ulna in winning the title.	
22	Big Van Vader	March 6, 1999	Excite Series tour	Tokyo, Japan	1	57	0	Defeated Akira Taue to win the vacant title.	
23	Mitsuharu Misawa	May 2, 1999	Giant Baba Memorial Show	Tokyo, Japan	5	181	2		
24	Big Van Vader	October 30, 1999	October Giant Series tour	Tokyo, Japan	2	120	1		
25	Kenta Kobashi	February 27, 2000	Excite Series tour	Tokyo, Japan	3	110	1		
—	Vacated	June 16, 2000	—	—	—	—	—	Title was vacated after Kobashi jumped to Pro Wrestling Noah.	
26	Genichiro Tenryu	October 28, 2000	October Giant Series tour	Tokyo, Japan	2	223	1	Defeated Toshiaki Kawada in a tournament final to win the vacated title.	
27	Keiji Muto	June 8, 2001	Super Power Series tour	Tokyo, Japan	1	261	4		
28	Toshiaki Kawada	February 24, 2002	Excite Series tour	Tokyo, Japan	4	32	0		
—	Vacated	March 28, 2002	—	—	—	—	—	Title was vacated after Kawada suffered a knee injury.	
29	Genichiro Tenryu	April 13, 2002	Champion Carnival tour	Tokyo, Japan	3	197	1	Defeated Keiji Muto to win the vacant title.	
30	The Great Muta	October 27, 2002	Royal Road 30 Giant Battle Final	Tokyo, Japan	2	119	1	Formerly known as Keiji Muto.	
31	Shinya Hashimoto	February 23, 2003	Excite Series tour	Tokyo, Japan	1	171	2		
—	Vacated	August 13, 2003	—	—	—	—	—	Title was vacated after Hashimoto dislocated his right shoulder.	
32	Toshiaki Kawada	September 6, 2003	Summer Action Series II tour	Tokyo, Japan	5	529	10	Defeated Shinjiro Otani in a tournament final to win the vacant title.	
33	Satoshi Kojima	February 16, 2005	Realize tour	Tokyo, Japan	1	502	8		
34	Taiyō Kea	July 3, 2006	Crossover tour	Tokyo, Japan	1	62	1		
35	Minoru Suzuki	September 3, 2006	Summer Impact tour	Sapporo, Japan	1	357	5		
36	Kensuke Sasaki	August 26, 2007	Pro Wrestling Love in Ryogoku Vol. 3	Tokyo, Japan	1	247	2		
37	Suwama	April 29, 2008	Growin' Up tour	Nagoya, Japan	1	152	2		
38	The Great Muta	September 28, 2008	Flashing tour	Yokohama, Japan	3	167	1		
39	Yoshihiro Takayama	March 14, 2009	Pro Wrestling Love in Ryogoku Vol. 7	Tokyo, Japan	1	196	2		
40	Satoshi Kojima	September 26, 2009	Flashing tour	Yokohama, Japan	2	176	1		
41	Ryota Hama	March 21, 2010	Pro Wrestling Love in Ryogoku Vol. 9	Tokyo, Japan	1	42	0		
42	Minoru Suzuki	May 2, 2010	Growin' Up tour	Nagoya, Japan	2	119	1		
43	Suwama	August 29, 2010	Pro Wrestling Love in Ryogoku Vol. 10	Tokyo, Japan	2	420	5		
44	Jun Akiyama	October 23, 2011	Pro Wrestling Love in Ryogoku Vol. 13	Tokyo, Japan	1	308	4		
45	Masakatsu Funaki	August 26, 2012	Summer Impact tour	Tokyo, Japan	1	203	4		
46	Suwama	March 17, 2013	2013 Pro Wrestling Love in Ryogoku: Basic & Dynamic	Tokyo, Japan	3	224	2		
47	Akebono	October 27, 2013	Anniversary Tour	Tokyo, Japan	1	215	4		
—	Vacated	May 30, 2014	—	—	—	—	—	Vacated due to Akebono being sidelined with health issues.	
48	Takao Omori	June 15, 2014	2014 Dynamite Series	Tokyo, Japan	1	14	0	Defeated Jun Akiyama to win the vacant title.	
49	Suwama	June 29, 2014	2014 Dynamite Series	Sapporo, Japan	4	28	0		
50	Joe Doering	July 27, 2014	2014 Summer Action Series	Tokyo, Japan	1	160	3		
51	Go Shiozaki	January 3, 2015	New Year Wars 2015	Tokyo, Japan	1	138	2		
52	Akebono	May 21, 2015	2015 Super Power Series	Tokyo, Japan	2	164	2		
53	Jun Akiyama	November 1, 2015	All Japan Pro Wrestling Charity Hirosaki Tournament	Hirosaki, Japan	2	62	0		
54	Suwama	January 2, 2016	2016 New Years Two Days	Tokyo, Japan	5	10	0		
—	Vacated	January 12, 2016	—	—	—	—	—	Vacated due to Suwama rupturing his achilles tendon.	
55	Kento Miyahara	February 12, 2016	2016 Excite Series	Tokyo, Japan	1	464	8	Defeated Zeus to win the vacant title.	
56	Shuji Ishikawa	May 21, 2017	2017 Super Power Series	Tokyo, Japan	1	98	2		
57	Kento Miyahara	August 27, 2017	AJPW 45th Anniversary	Tokyo, Japan	2	43	0		
58	Suwama	October 9, 2017	2017 Hataage Kinen Series	Tokyo, Japan	6	12	0		
59	Joe Doering	October 21, 2017	Jun Akiyama and Takao Omori Debut 25th Anniversary Show	Yokohama, Japan	2	155	3		
60	Kento Miyahara	March 25, 2018	2018 Power Dream Series	Saitama, Japan	3	126	2		
61	Zeus	July 29, 2018	2018 Summer Action Series	Osaka, Japan	1	84	1		
62	Kento Miyahara	October 21, 2018	2018 Raising An Army Memorial Series	Yokohama, Japan	4	519	10		
63	Suwama	March 23, 2020	2020 Dream Power Series	Tokyo, Japan	7	454	7		
—	Vacated	June 20, 2021	—	—	—	—	—	Suwama vacated the championship after testing positive for COVID-19.	
64	Jake Lee	June 26, 2021	Champions Night ~ From The Land Of The Triple Crown Unification Flight To The 50th Anniversary	Tokyo, Japan	1	185	3	Lee defeated Kento Miyahara and Yuma Aoyagi in a three-way tomoesen match to win the vacant title.	
—	Vacated	December 28, 2021	—	—	—	—	—	Jake Lee vacated the championship after suffering an injury.	
65	Kento Miyahara	January 23, 2022	2022 New Year Wars	Tokyo, Japan	5	147	4	Defeated Ryuki Honda in a tournament final to win the vacant title.	
66	Jake Lee	June 19, 2022	AJPW Champions Night 4: 50th Anniversary Tour	Tokyo, Japan	2	25	0		
67	Suwama	July 14, 2022	AJPW Summer Action Series 2022	Tokyo, Japan	8	66	0		
68	Kento Miyahara	September 18, 2022	AJPW 50th Anniversary	Tokyo, Japan	6	154	4		
69	Yuji Nagata	February 19, 2023	Excite Series - Night 2: Pro-Wrestling Day MANIAx	Tokyo, Japan	1	133	3		
70	Yuma Aoyagi	July 2, 2023	Summer Action Series	Tokyo, Japan	1	126	5		
71	Katsuhiko Nakajima	November 5, 2023	Giant Series 2023: Hokkaido Edition - Day 6 (Evening Show)	Sapporo, Japan	1	146	4		
72	Yuma Anzai	March 30, 2024	Dream Power Series 2024: Day 5	Tokyo, Japan	1	140	5		
73	Yuma Aoyagi	August 17, 2024	Summer Action Wars 2024	Tokyo, Japan	2	79	2		
74	Davey Boy Smith, Jr.	November 4, 2024	Giant Series 2024	Sapporo, Japan	1	57	0		
75	Jun Saito	December 31, 2024	New Year's Eve 2024	Tokyo, Japan	1	266	7		
76	Kento Miyahara	September 23, 2025	Giant Dream	Tokyo, Japan	7	416+	10		

== Combined reigns ==
As of November 13, 2026.

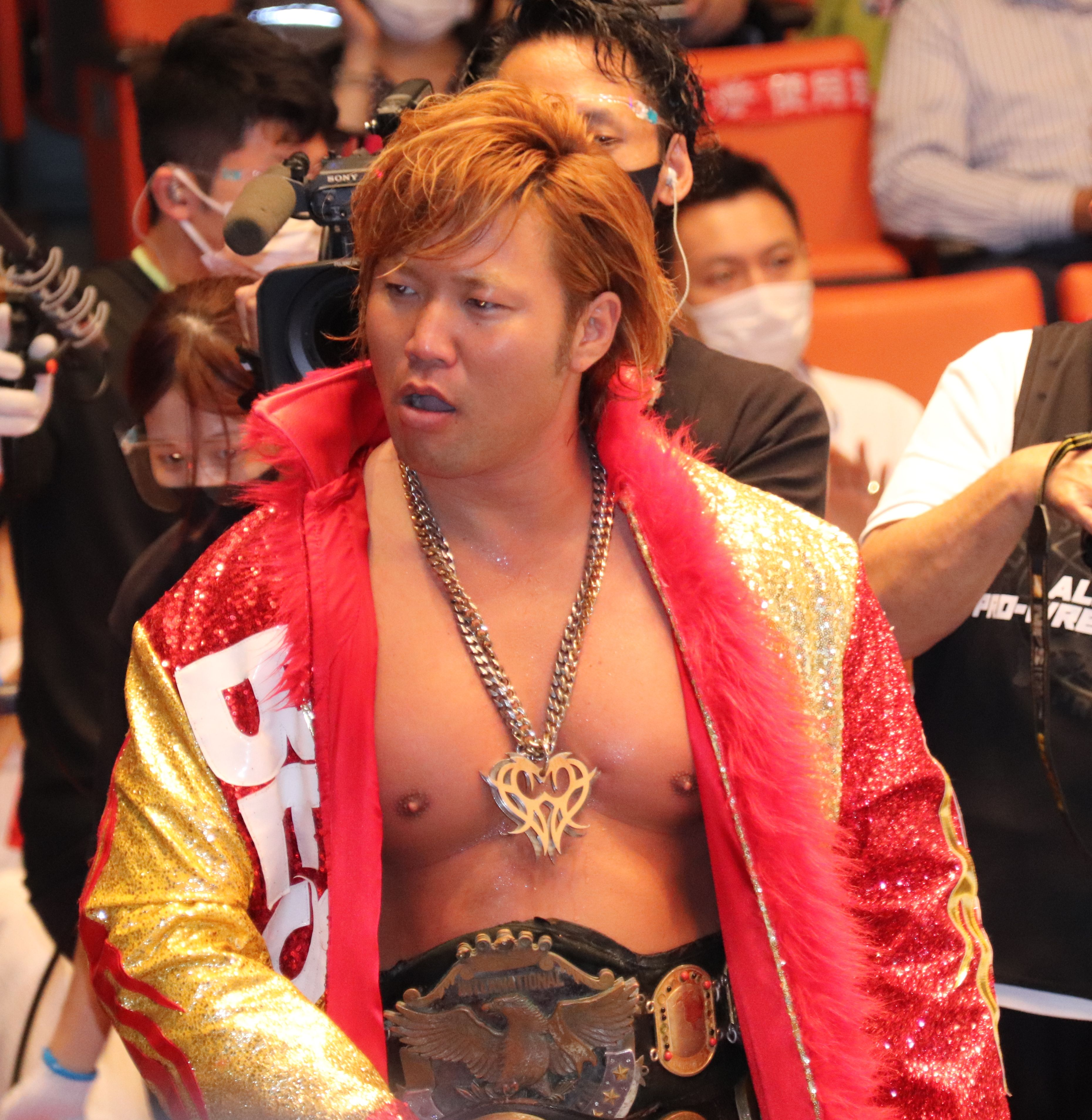
Seven-time and current champion Kento Miyahara holds the records for most defenses in one reign at 10 (tied with Toshiaki Kawada twice), most combined defenses at 38 and most combined days at 1,869+ days.

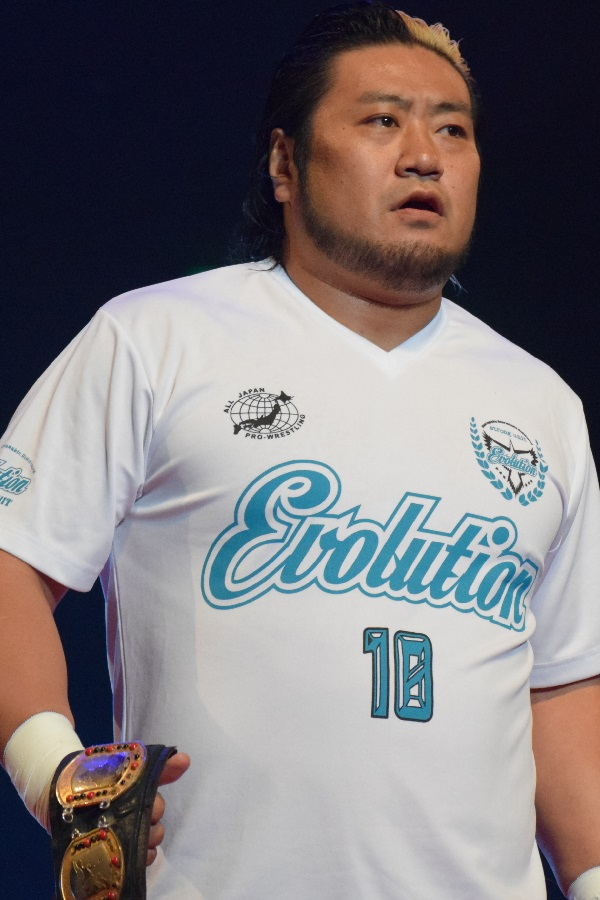
Record eight-time champion Suwama.

†	Indicates the current champion

Rank	Wrestler	No. of reigns	Combined defenses	Combined days
1	Kento Miyahara †	7	38	1,869+
2	Mitsuharu Misawa	5	21	1,799
3	Suwama	8	16	1,366
4	Toshiaki Kawada	5	11	743
5	Satoshi Kojima	2	9	678
6	Jumbo Tsuruta	3	6	659
7	Genichiro Tenryu	3	4	548
8	Keiji Muto/The Great Muta	3	6	547
9	Stan Hansen	4	7	505
10	Minoru Suzuki	2	6	476
11	Kenta Kobashi	3	5	431
12	Akebono	2	6	379
13	Jun Akiyama	2	4	370
14	Joe Doering	2	6	315
15	Jun Saito	1	7	266
16	Kensuke Sasaki	1	2	247
17	Jake Lee	2	3	210
18	Yuma Aoyagi	2	7	205
19	Masakatsu Funaki	1	4	203
20	Yoshihiro Takayama	1	2	196
21	Big Van Vader	2	1	177
22	Shinya Hashimoto	1	2	171
23	Katsuhiko Nakajima	1	4	146
24	Yuma Anzai	1	5	140
25	Go Shiozaki	1	2	138
26	Yuji Nagata	1	3	133
27	Shuji Ishikawa	1	2	98
28	Steve Williams	1	1	86
29	Zeus	1	1	84
30	Taiyō Kea	1	1	62
31	Akira Taue	1	1	61
32	Davey Boy Smith Jr.	1	0	57
33	Ryota Hama	1	0	42
34	Takao Omori	1	0	14
35	Terry Gordy	2	0	13

Sporting positions
Preceded by PWF World Heavyweight Championship	All Japan Pro Wrestling's top heavyweight championship 1989–present	Succeeded by Current
