= IWRG 17th Anniversary Show =

2013 International Wrestling Revolution Group event

- Official poster for the 17th Anniversary
- Promotion: International Wrestling Revolution Group
- Date: January 1, 2013
- City: Naucalpan, State of Mexico
- Venue: Arena Naucalpan

Event chronology
← Previous; Arena Naucalpan 35th Anniversary Show	Next → El Protector

IWRG Anniversary Shows chronology
← Previous; 16th Anniversary	Next → 18th Anniversary

The IWRG 17th Anniversary Show was an annual professional wrestling major event produced by Mexican professional wrestling promotion International Wrestling Revolution Group (IWRG), which took place on January 1, 2013, in Arena Naucalpan, Naucalpan, State of Mexico, Mexico. The main event was a lucha libre special stipulation match, the Relevos Suicidas Tag Team match. In a Relevos Suicida match the first two wrestlers pinned are forced to wrestle against each other with a wager on the line. In the main event the teams consisted of rivals Oficial 911 and El Ángel teaming up to take on Oficial Factor and Hijo de Pirata Morgan who had been rivals as well. Each wrestler would risk something in case they lost; 911 would risk his wrestling mask, El Angel the IWRG Intercontinental Middleweight Championship, Factor risked the IWRG Rey del Ring Championship and Hijo de Pirata Morgan would risk the IWRG Junior de Juniors Championship if he was pinned in the tag team match. On the under card a team representing IWRG's Naucalpan based wrestling school (Alan Extreme, Black Terry, Carta Brava, Jr., Dinamic Black, Eita, Golden Magic, Imposible and Saruman) facing a team representing Fuerza Guerrera's Gimnasio Konkreto (Guerrera, Arana de Plata, Fleeyzer, John Crazy, King Boy, Mr. Leo, Rey Espacial and Rey Tabu). The show featured three additional matches.

== Production ==
=== Background ===
The 2013 International Wrestling Revolution Group (IWRG; Sometimes referred to as Grupo Internacional Revolución in Spanish) anniversary show commemorated the 17th anniversary of IWRG's creation as a wrestling promotion and holding their first show on January 1, 1996. The Anniversary show, as well as the majority of the IWRG shows in general are held in "Arena Naucalpan", owned by the promoters of IWRG and their main arena. The Anniversary Shows generally take place on January 1 each year whenever possible.

=== Storylines ===
The event featured six professional wrestling matches with different wrestlers involved in pre-existing scripted feuds, plots and storylines. Wrestlers were portrayed as either heels (referred to as rudos in Mexico, those that portray the "bad guys") or faces (técnicos in Mexico, the "good guy" characters) as they followed a series of tension-building events, which culminated in a wrestling match or series of matches.

== Results ==
No.	Results	Stipulations
1	Araña de Plata and Fulgor defeated Seiya and Serpiente de Oro – two falls to one	Tag team best two-out-of-three falls tag team match
2	Los Oficialitos (Oficialito 911, Oficialito AK47 and Oficialito Fierro) defeated Mini Canis Lupus, Mini Cobra and Mini Multifacetico – two falls to one	Best two-out-of-three falls six-man tag team match
3	Los Oficiales (Oficial AK-47 and Oficial Fierro) and Cerebro Negro and defeated Los Clowns (Dave The Clown, Niko and Rothen Clown) – two falls to one	Best two-out-of-three falls six-man tag team match
4	Gimnasio Konkreto (Araña de Plata, Fleeyzer, Fuerza Guerrera, John Crazy, King Boy, Mr. Leo, Rey Espacial and Rey Tabu) defeated Gimnasio Naucalpan (Alan Extreme, Black Terry, Carta Brava, Jr., Dinamic Black, Eita, Golden Magic, Imposible and Saruman)	Copa Higher Power, 16-man Torneo cibernetico Match
5	Oficial 911 and El Ángel defeated Oficial Factor and Hijo de Pirata Morgan	Relevos Suicidas Tag Team match
6	Factor (C - Rey) defeated Hijo de Pirata Morgan (C - Junior)	Best two-out-of-three falls singles match for the IWRG Junior de Juniors Championship and Rey del Ring Championship
