= Arena Naucalpan 37th Anniversary Show =

2014 International Wrestling Revolution Group event

- Official poster for the event
- Promotion: International Wrestling Revolution Group
- Date: December 21, 2014
- City: Naucalpan, State of Mexico
- Venue: Arena Naucalpan

Event chronology
← Previous; Caravana de Campeones	Next → IWRG 19th Anniversary Show

Arena Naucalpan Anniversary Show chronology
← Previous; 36th Anniversary	Next → 38th Anniversary

The Arena Naucalpan 37th Anniversary Show was a major annual professional wrestling event produced and scripted by the Mexican professional wrestling promotion International Wrestling Revolution Group (IWRG), which took place on December 21, 2014, in Arena Naucalpan, Naucalpan, State of Mexico, Mexico. As the name implies the show celebrated the 37th Anniversary of the construction of Arena Naucalpan, IWRG's main venue in 1977. The show is IWRG's longest-running show, predating IWRG being founded in 1996 and is the fourth oldest, still held, annual show in professional wrestling.

The main event of the anniversary show was a 10-man steel cage match contested under Lucha de Apuestas, or "bet match" rules, where the last man in the ring would be forced to either unmask or have their hair shaved off as a result. Canis Lupus, El Hijo del Máscara Año 2000, El Hijo del Pirata Morgan, Máscara Año 2000, Máscara Sagrada, Pirata Morgan, Rayo de Jalisco Jr. and Súper Nova all climbed out of the cage, leaving Oficial AK-47 to defeat X-Fly, thanks to help from his regular tag team partner Oficial 911. Afterwards X-Fly was forced to be shaved bald as a result of his loss.

== Production ==
=== Background ===
The location at Calle Jardín 19, Naucalpan Centro, 53000 Naucalpan de Juárez, México, Mexico was originally an indoor roller rink for the locals in the late part of the 1950s known as "Cafe Algusto". By the early-1960s, the building was sold and turned into "Arena KO Al Gusto" and became a local lucha libre or professional wrestling arena, with a ring permanently set up in the center of the building. Promoter Adolfo Moreno began holding shows on a regular basis from the late 1960s, working with various Mexican promotions such as Empresa Mexicana de Lucha Libre (EMLL) to bring lucha libre to Naucalpan. By the mid-1970s the existing building was so run down that it was no longer suitable for hosting any events. Moreno bought the old build and had it demolished, building Arena Naucalpan on the same location, becoming the permanent home of Promociones Moreno. Arena Naucalpan opened its doors for the first lucha libre show on December 17, 1977. From that point on the arena hosted regular weekly shows for Promociones Moreno and also hosted EMLL and later Universal Wrestling Association (UWA) on a regular basis. In the 1990s the UWA folded and Promociones Moreno worked primarily with EMLL, now rebranded as Consejo Mundial de Lucha Libre (CMLL).

In late 1995 Adolfo Moreno decided to create his own promotion, creating a regular roster instead of relying totally on wrestlers from other promotions, creating the International Wrestling Revolution Group (IWRG; sometimes referred to as Grupo Internacional Revolución in Spanish) on January 1, 1996. From that point on Arena Naucalpan became the main venue for IWRG, hosting the majority of their weekly shows and all of their major shows as well. While IWRG was a fresh start for the Moreno promotion they kept the annual Arena Naucalpan Anniversary Show tradition alive, making it the only IWRG show series that actually preceded their foundation. The Arena Naucalpan Anniversary Show is the fourth oldest still ongoing annual show in professional wrestling, the only annual shows that older are the Consejo Mundial de Lucha Libre Anniversary Shows (started in 1934), the Arena Coliseo Anniversary Show (first held in 1943), and the Aniversario de Arena México (first held in 1957).

=== Storylines ===
The event featured five professional wrestling matches with different wrestlers involved in pre-existing scripted feuds, plots and storylines. Wrestlers were portrayed as either heels (referred to as rudos in Mexico, those that portray the "bad guys") or faces (técnicos in Mexico, the "good guy" characters) as they followed a series of tension-building events, which culminated in a wrestling match or series of matches.

== Event ==
In the second match of the night El Hijo del Diablo gained a tainted victory for his team (Apolo Estrada Jr., Electro Boy and Imposible) over Los Tortugas Ninjas (Leo, Mike, Rafy and Teelo) when he tricked one of Los Tortugas into hitting a referee with one of his moves as El Hijo del Diablo ducked out of the way. Los Tortugas were subsequently disqualified for hitting the referee.

The fourth match of the night saw Negro Navarro team up with Black Terry to take on his sons, the masked wrestlers known as Los Traumas (Trauma I and Trauma II). Prior to the match Navarro took the microphone and managed to convince Los Traumas to wrestle a clean, technical match. Navarro and Black Terry defeated Navarro's sons in two straight falls. Afterwards Los Traumas praised both of the much older wrestlers, with Trauma II handing Black Terry as a sign of respect.

All ten competitors in the main event steel cage match were supposed to fight for 10-minutes before they would be allowed to leave the ring, but Pirata Morgan and El Hijo de Pirata Morgan started the match off early by attacking Máscara Sagrada outside the ring as he was being introduced to the crowd. Once the remaining competitors; Canis Lupus, El Hijo del Máscara Año 2000, Máscara Año 2000, Oficial AK-47, Rayo de Jalisco Jr., Súper Nova and X-Fly were inside the cage the match itself could start. The match came down to Oficial AK-47 and X-Fly as the last two men in the cage. Moments later Oficial 911 came to ringside and helped his regular tag team partner defeat X-Fly. As a result, X-Fly had all his hair shaved off.

== Results ==
No.	Results	Stipulations
1	Dragón Celestial and Metaleon defeated Araña de Plata Jr. and Hip Hop Man	Best two-out-of-three-falls tag team match
2	Apolo Estrada Jr., El Hijo del Diablo, Electro Boy and Imposible defeated Los Tortugas Ninjas (Leo, Mike, Rafy and Teelo) by disqualification	Best two-out-of-three falls eight-man tag team match
3	Emperador Azteca, El Pantera I and Mike Segura defeated Chicano, Eterno and Oficial 911 by disqualification	Best two-out-of-three falls six-man tag team match
4	Black Terry and Negro Navarro defeated Los Traumas (Trauma I and Trauma II)	Best two-out-of-three-falls tag team match
5	Oficial AK-47 defeated X-Fly; Also in the match: Canis Lupus, El Hijo del Máscara Año 2000, El Hijo del Pirata Morgan, Máscara Año 2000, Máscara Sagrada, Pirata Morgan, Rayo de Jalisco Jr. and Súper Nova	10-man Lucha de Apuestas, mask or hair, steel cage match
