= Seiya =

- Pronunciation: Sei-ya
- Gender: Male
- Language: Japanese

Origin
- Origin: Japanese
- Meaning: star arrow
- Region of origin: Japan

Other names
- Related names: Seizō

Seiya (星矢) is a masculine name of Japanese origin. It is a common masculine Japanese given name.

== Written forms ==
Seiya can be written in Hiragana as せいや. In Kanji, it can be alternatively rendered as;

- 星矢 "star, heavenly body of arrow"
- 清耶 "pure, father"
- 正夜 "correct, night"
- 生八 "life, eight"
- 成也 "successful, to be"
- 声弥 "voice, extensive complete"
- 盛哉 "prosper, how"
- 聖野 "holy, field"
- 世乎 "world, question"
- 西椰 "west, coconut tree"
- 征椰 "conquer, coconut tree"

== People with the name ==
- Seiya Adachi (安達安 星矢, born 1995), Japanese water polo player
- Seiya Ando (安藤 誓哉, born 1992), Japanese basketball player
- Asahifuji Seiya (旭富士 正也, born 1960), Japanese sumo wrestler
- Seiya Baba (馬場 晴也, born 2001) is a Japanese professional footballer
- Seiya Da Costa Lay (born 2001) is an Indonesian professional footballer.
- Seiya Fujita (藤田 征也, born 1987), Japanese footballer
- Seiya Hosokawa (細川 成也, born 1988), Japanese baseball player
- Seiya Inoue (baseball) (井上 晴哉; born 1989), Japanese baseball player
- Seiya Katakura (片倉誠也, born 1998) is a Japanese footballer.
- Seiya Kinami (木浪 聖也, born 1994), Japanese baseball infielder
- Seiya Kishikawa (岸川聖也, born 1987), Japanese table tennis player
- Seiya Kitano (星矢 北野, born 1997), Japanese footballer
- Seiya Kojima (小島 聖矢, born 1989) Japanese footballer
- Seiya Kondō (近藤 誠也, born 1996), Japanese shogi player
- Seiya Maikuma (毎熊 晟矢, born 1997) is a Japanese professional footballer
- Seiya Morohashi (諸橋晴也, born 1977) is a Japanese professional wrestler.
- Seiya Motoki (元木 聖也, born 1993), Japanese actor
- Seiya Nakagawa (中川 誠也, born, 1993), Japanese baseball player
- Seiya Nakano (中野誠也, born 1995), is a Japanese football player
- Seiya Niizeki (新関 成弥, born, 1999), Japanese football player
- Seiya Sakamoto (坂本 清耶, born 1944), Japanese water polo player
- Seiya Sanada (真田 聖也, born 1988), Japanese professional wrestler
- Seiya Sugishita (杉下 聖也, born 1988), Japanese footballer
- Seiya Suezawa (末澤 誠也, born 1994), Japanese idol and actor
- Seiya Suzuki (鈴木 誠也, born 1994), Japanese baseball player
- Seiya Tsutsumi (堤聖也, born 1995) is a Japanese professional boxer
- Seiya Tomita (冨田 誠也, born 1996) is a Japanese professional shogi player.
- Seiya Yamaguchi (山口 聖矢, born 1993), is a Japanese football player

== Fictional characters ==
- Pegasus Seiya, the main character in the manga series Saint Seiya
- Kou Seiya (星野 光), a character in the manga series Sailor Moon
- Seiya Ryuguin, the main protagonist of the light novel series Cautious Hero: The Hero Is Overpowered but Overly Cautious
- Seiya Yaboshi, a character in the manga series UFO Baby
- Seiya Kanie, protagonist of the light novel series Amagi Brilliant Park
- Seiya Takehaya, a character in the light novel series Tsurune
