= IWRG 19th Anniversary Show =

2015 International Wrestling Revolution Group event

- Poster for the show, mistakenly listing it as the 18th anniversary.
- Promotion: International Wrestling Revolution Group
- Date: January 1, 2015 (aired January 5, 2015)
- City: Naucalpan, State of Mexico
- Venue: Arena Naucalpan

Event chronology
← Previous; Arena Naucalpan 37th Anniversary Show	Next → El Protector

IWRG Anniversary Shows chronology
← Previous; 18th Anniversary	Next → 20th Anniversary

The IWRG 19th Anniversary Show was an annual professional wrestling major event produced by Mexican professional wrestling promotion International Wrestling Revolution Group (IWRG), which took place on January 1, 2015, in Arena Naucalpan, Naucalpan, State of Mexico, Mexico. The show commemorated the creation of the IWRG 19 years prior on January 1, 1996, when Adolfo "Pirata" Moreno took over running the wrestling in Arena Naucalpan and turned it into the IWRG.

== Production ==
=== Background ===
The 2015 International Wrestling Revolution Group (IWRG; Sometimes referred to as Grupo Internacional Revolución in Spanish) anniversary show commemorated the 19th anniversary of IWRG's creation as a wrestling promotion and holding their first show on January 1, 1996. The Anniversary show, as well as the majority of the IWRG shows in general are held in "Arena Naucalpan", owned by the promoters of IWRG and their main arena. The Anniversary Shows generally take place on January 1 each year whenever possible.

=== Storylines ===
The event featured five professional wrestling matches with different wrestlers involved in pre-existing scripted feuds, plots and storylines. Wrestlers were portrayed as either heels (referred to as rudos in Mexico, those that portray the "bad guys") or faces (técnicos in Mexico, the "good guy" characters) as they followed a series of tension-building events, which culminated in a wrestling match or series of matches.

== Results ==
No.	Results	Stipulations
1^{D}	El Fresero Jr. and Hip Hop Man defeated Alfa and Sky Angel	tag team match
2	Douki, Imposible and Tony Rivera defeated La Diva Salvaje, Estrella Divina and Miss Gaviota	Best two-out-of-three falls six-man "Lucha Libre rules" tag team match
3	Los Tortugas Ninjas (Leo, Mike, Rafy and Teelo) defeated Oficial AK-47, Liderk and Los Gringos VIP (Apolo Estrada Jr. and El Hijo del Diablo)	Best two-out-of-three falls six-man "Lucha Libre rules" tag team match
4	Danny Casas, Chicano and Hijo de Máscara Año 2000 defeated Canis Lupus, Eterno and X-Fly	Best two-out-of-three falls six-man "Lucha Libre rules" tag team match
5	El Hijo de Dos Caras, Máscara Sagrada and Pantera defeated Monsther, Pirata Morgan and El Hijo del Pirata Morgan	Best two-out-of-three falls six-man "Lucha Libre rules" tag team match
D / – this was a dark match
