= Arena Naucalpan 36th Anniversary Show =

2013 International Wrestling Revolution Group event

- Official poster for the event
- Promotion: International Wrestling Revolution Group
- Date: December 19, 2013
- City: Naucalpan, State of Mexico
- Venue: Arena Naucalpan

Event chronology
← Previous; Caravana de Campeones	Next → IWRG 18th Anniversary Show

Arena Naucalpan Anniversary Show chronology
← Previous; 35th Anniversary	Next → 37th Anniversary

The Arena Naucalpan 36th Anniversary Show was a major annual professional wrestling event produced and scripted by the Mexican professional wrestling promotion International Wrestling Revolution Group (IWRG), which took place on December 19, 2013 in Arena Naucalpan, Naucalpan, State of Mexico, Mexico. As the name implies the show celebrated the 36th Anniversary of the construction of Arena Naucalpan, IWRG's main venue in 1977. The show is IWRG's longest-running show, predating IWRG being founded in 1996 and is the fourth oldest, still held, annual show in professional wrestling.

The main event was a Triangular de la Muerte ("Triangle of death") match, with three teams competing against each other in a match where the losing team would be forced to unmask or have their hair shaved off under Lucha de Apuestas, or "bet match" ("betting fight"), rules. Oficial Fierro and Trauma II escaped the match with their hair and mask safe, leading to Golden Magic and El Hijo de Pirata Morgan defeating Oficial 911 and X-Fly. As a result, X-Fly was shaved bald and Oficial 911 had to take off his mask and state his given name per lucha libre traditions.

== Production ==
=== Background ===
The location at Calle Jardín 19, Naucalpan Centro, 53000 Naucalpan de Juárez, México, Mexico was originally an indoor roller rink for the locals in the late part of the 1950s known as "Cafe Algusto". By the early-1960s, the building was sold and turned into "Arena KO Al Gusto" and became a local lucha libre or professional wrestling arena, with a ring permanently set up in the center of the building. Promoter Adolfo Moreno began holding shows on a regular basis from the late 1960s, working with various Mexican promotions such as Empresa Mexicana de Lucha Libre (EMLL) to bring lucha libre to Naucalpan. By the mid-1970s the existing building was so run down that it was no longer suitable for hosting any events. Moreno bought the old build and had it demolished, building Arena Naucalpan on the same location, becoming the permanent home of Promociones Moreno. Arena Naucalpan opened its doors for the first lucha libre show on December 17, 1977. From that point on the arena hosted regular weekly shows for Promociones Moreno and also hosted EMLL and later Universal Wrestling Association (UWA) on a regular basis. In the 1990s the UWA folded and Promociones Moreno worked primarily with EMLL, now rebranded as Consejo Mundial de Lucha Libre (CMLL).

In late 1995 Adolfo Moreno decided to create his own promotion, creating a regular roster instead of relying totally on wrestlers from other promotions, creating the International Wrestling Revolution Group (IWRG; sometimes referred to as Grupo Internacional Revolución in Spanish) on January 1, 1996. From that point on Arena Naucalpan became the main venue for IWRG, hosting the majority of their weekly shows and all of their major shows as well. While IWRG was a fresh start for the Moreno promotion they kept the annual Arena Naucalpan Anniversary Show tradition alive, making it the only IWRG show series that actually preceded their foundation. The Arena Naucalpan Anniversary Show is the fourth oldest still ongoing annual show in professional wrestling, the only annual shows that older are the Consejo Mundial de Lucha Libre Anniversary Shows (started in 1934), the Arena Coliseo Anniversary Show (first held in 1943), and the Aniversario de Arena México (first held in 1957).=

=== Storylines ===
The event featured five professional wrestling matches with different wrestlers involved in pre-existing scripted feuds, plots and storylines. Wrestlers were portrayed as either heels (referred to as rudos in Mexico, those that portray the "bad guys") or faces (técnicos in Mexico, the "good guy" characters) as they followed a series of tension-building events, which culminated in a wrestling match or series of matches.

== Event ==
Fugor II was originally scheduled for the opening match of the show, but for unrevealed reasons he was replaced by Rey Hechicero in the match.

The main event match was a Triangular de la Muerte ("Triangle of Death") match, with three tag teams competing against each other. The first team to gain a pinfall or a submission would escape the match, leaving the last two teams to compete under Lucha de Apuestas, or "bet match", rules where both members of the team would unmask or have their hair shaved off. Each of the three teams consisted of a mask and an unmasked wrestler, the first team to escape was the masked Trauma II and the unmasked Oficial Fierro. The last two teams, Golden Magic (masked) and El Hijo de Pirata Morgan (unmasked) facing off against Oficial 911 (masked) and X-Fly (unmasked). Both Hijo de Pirata Morgan and X-Fly were pinned, leaving the two masked wrestlers in the ring to face off. During the match Oficial Fierro came to ringside to try and help his partner out, going so far as trying to help Oficial 911 escape the ring. The exit was blocked by Golden Magic's father, a professional wrestler known as Mr. Magia. In the end Golden Magic pinned Oficial 911. After unmasking, Oficial 911 announced that his real name was José Ángel Bocanegra González, that he was 28 years old and had been a professional wrestler for 15 years at that point in time.

== Aftermath ==
A year later, almost to the date, Oficial 911 gained a measure of revenge on X-Fly, blaming him for the team loss, as he helped Oficial AK-47 win a steel cage match against X-Fly in the main event of the Arena Naucalpan 37th Anniversary Show. As a result, X-Fly was shaved bald once again.

== Results ==
No.	Results	Stipulations
1	Alfa, Emperador Azteca and Omega defeated Fulgor, Rey Hechicero and Kalim-Black	Best two-out-of-three-falls six-man tag team match
2	Bracito de Plata and Piratita Morgan defeated Dragoncito de Oro and Mini Multifacético	Best two-out-of-three-falls tag team match
3	Canis Lupus, Danny Casas and Douki defeated Diva Salvaje, Dr. Cerebro and Miss Gaviota	Best two-out-of-three-falls six-man tag team match
4	Alan Extreme, Máscara Púrpura and El Veneno defeated Apolo Estrada Jr., Súper Nova and Trauma I	Best two-out-of-three-falls six-man tag team match
5	Golden Magic and El Hijo del Pirata Morgan defeated Oficial 911 and X-Fly, also in the match Oficial Fierro and Trauma II	Triangular de la Muerte, three-way Lucha de Apuestas, mask and hair match
