= Arena Naucalpan 34th Anniversary Show =

2011 International Wrestling Revolution Group event

- Official poster for the show depicting Oficial 911, Oficial AK-47, Trauma I and Trauma II
- Promotion: International Wrestling Revolution Group
- Date: December 22, 2011
- City: Naucalpan, State of Mexico
- Venue: Arena Naucalpan

Event chronology
← Previous; 49th Anniversary of Lucha Libre in Estado de México	Next → Guerra de Campeones

Arena Naucalpan Anniversary Shows chronology
← Previous; 33rd Anniversary	Next → 35th Anniversary

The Arena Naucalpan 34th Anniversary Show was an annual professional wrestling major event produced by Mexican professional wrestling promotion International Wrestling Revolution Group (IWRG), which took place on December 22, 2011 in Arena Naucalpan, Naucalpan, State of Mexico, Mexico. The show celebrated the 34th Anniversary of the construction of Arena Naucalpann, IWRG's main venue, in December 1977. From 1977 until 1996 the arena was affiliated with various promotions such as Universal Wrestling Association (UWA) and Consejo Mundial de Lucha Libre (CMLL) but in 1996 arena owner and wrestling promoter Adolfo Moreno created his own promotion, IWRG.

== Production ==
=== Background ===
Promoter Adolfo Moreno had promoted Lucha Libre, or professional wrestling in Naucalpan, State of Mexico, Mexico prior to financing the building of Arena Naucalpan that opened in late 1976. Originally Moreno worked together with the Universal Wrestling Association (UWA) and then later Consejo Mundial de Lucha Libre (CMLL) as a local promoter. On January 1, 1996 Moreno created International Wrestling Revolution Group (IWRG) as an independent promotion. IWRG celebrates the anniversary of Arena Naucalpan each year in December with a major show, making it the second oldest, still promoted show series in the world. pre-dating WrestleMania by eight years. Only the CMLL Anniversary Show series has a longer history. The 2011 Arena Naucalpan anniversary show marked the 34th Anniversary of Arena Naucalpab. The Anniversary show, as well as the majority of the IWRG shows in general are held in Arena Naucalpan.

=== Storylines ===
The event featured seven professional wrestling matches with different wrestlers involved in pre-existing scripted feuds, plots and storylines. Wrestlers were portrayed as either heels (referred to as rudos in Mexico, those that portray the "bad guys") or faces (técnicos in Mexico, the "good guy" characters) as they followed a series of tension-building events, which culminated in a wrestling match or series of matches.

== Results ==
No.	Results	Stipulations
1	Los Astros (Astro de Plata and Astro Rey Jr.) and Tritón defeated Imposible and Los Gemelos Fantasticos (I and II) – Two falls to zero	Best two-out-of-three falls tag team match
2	Alan Extreme and Los Gringos VIP (Apolo Estrada Jr. and Avisman) defeated Centvrión, Multifacético and Saruman – Two falls to one	Best two out of three falls six-man tag team match
3	Carta Brava, Jr. defeated Dinamic Black (C) – Two falls to one	Best two-out-of-three falls match for the IWRG Intercontinental Lightweight Championship
4	Eterno (C - WWS) defeated Golden Magic (C - IWRG) – Two falls to one	Best two-out-of-three falls match for the IWRG Intercontinental Welterweight Championship and WWS World Welterweight Championship
5	Canis Lupus, Headhunter A and Hernandez defeated El Pantera, El Texano, Jr. and Tony Rivera – Two falls to one	Best two-out-of-three falls six-man tag team match
6	Oficial 911 and Trauma II defeated Oficial AK-47 and Trauma I	Relevos Suicidas, losing team advances tag team match
7	Trauma I defeated Oficial AK-47 – Two falls to one	Best two-out-of-three falls Lucha de Apuestas, Mask Vs. Mask match
