= Gaora TV Championship =

Professional wrestling championship

- Current design of the championship (2012 – present)

Details
- Promotion: All Japan Pro Wrestling
- Date established: October 7, 2012
- Current champion: Oddyssey
- Date won: November 3, 2026

Other name
- AJPW Gaora TV Championship
Statistics
- First champion: Seiya Sanada
- Most reigns: Yohei Nakajima/Black Menso-re (5 reigns)
- Longest reign: Yoshitatsu (587 days)
- Shortest reign: Kazuhiro Tamura (6 days)
- Oldest champion: Masaaki Mochizuki (56 years, 6 months and 16 days)
- Youngest champion: Jiro Kuroshio (24 years, 2 months and 8 days)
- Heaviest champion: Oddyssey (184 kg (406 lb))
- Lightest champion: Kotaro Suzuki (83 kg (183 lb))

The Gaora TV Championship (GAORA TV チャンピオンシップ, Gaora Tī Bui Chanpionshippu) is a professional wrestling championship owned by the All Japan Pro Wrestling (AJPW) promotion. On August 28, 2012, AJPW and Gaora TV announced that AJPW would introduce a new championship called the Gaora TV Championship. A tournament for the title took place from September 8 to October 7, with Seiya Sanada becoming the inaugural champion.

There have been a total of 34 reigns shared between 27 different champions. The current title holder is Masaaki Mochizuki who is in his first reign.

== Championship tournament ==
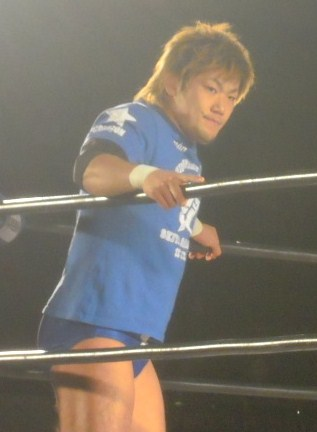
Inaugural champion Seiya Sanada

First Round (September 8)
Ryota Hama	06:21
Yasufumi Nakanoue	W
Kazushi Miyamoto	W
Manabu Soya	06:01
Masayuki Kono	12:02
Tomoaki Honma	W
Seiya Sanada	W
Yuji Okabayashi	16:04

Semifinals (October 7)
Yasufumi Nakanoue	W
Kazushi Miyamoto	07:10
Tomoaki Honma	12:30
Seiya Sanada	W

Final (October 7)
Yasufumi Nakanoue	10:54
Seiya Sanada	W

== Title history ==
Key
No.	Overall reign number
Reign	Reign number for the specific champion
Days	Number of days held
Defenses	Number of successful defenses
+	Current reign is changing daily

No.	Champion	Championship change			Reign statistics			Notes	Ref.
No.	Champion	Date	Event	Location	Reign	Days	Defenses	Notes	Ref.
All Japan Pro Wrestling (AJPW)
1	Seiya Sanada	October 7, 2012	40th Anniversary Tour 2012	Bunkyo, Tokyo, Japan	1	232	7	Sanada defeated Yasufumi Nakanoue in the final of an eight-man tournament to become the inaugural champion.	
2	René Duprée	May 27, 2013	Rising Sun in the Maritimes Tour	Cocagne, New Brunswick, Canada	1	107	21		
—	Vacated	September 11, 2013	—	—	—	—	—	Duprée returned the title to All Japan, after leaving the promotion for Wrestle-1.	
3	Sushi	November 24, 2013	2013 Ōdō Renaissance	Nagano, Nagano, Japan	1	174	1	Sushi defeated Keisuke Ishii in the final of a four-man tournament to win the vacant title.	
4	Kotaro Suzuki	May 17, 2014	2014 Super Power Series	Yokohama, Kanagawa, Japan	1	211	4		
5	Kenso	December 14, 2014	Kyohei Wada Referee 40th Anniversary & 60th Birthday Commemorative Tournament	Bunkyo, Tokyo, Japan	1	172	3		
6	Sushi	June 4, 2015	2015 Dynamite Series	Bunkyo, Tokyo, Japan	2	72	0		
—	Vacated	August 15, 2015	—	—	—	—	—	The title was vacated due to Sushi being sidelined with a fractured jaw.	
7	Yohei Nakajima	August 16, 2015	2015 Summer Explosion	Kobe, Hyōgo, Japan	1	298	3	Nakajima defeated Billyken Kid to win the vacant title.	
8	Kazuhiro Tamura	June 9, 2016	Charity Puroresu Isesaki 69	Isesaki, Gunma, Japan	1	6	0		
9	Yohei Nakajima	June 15, 2016	2016 Dynamite Series	Bunkyo, Tokyo, Japan	2	29	0		
10	Takeshi Minamino	July 14, 2016	2016 Summer Action Series	Bunkyo, Tokyo, Japan	1	28	0		
11	Yohei Nakajima	August 11, 2016	2016 Summer Explosion	Ueda, Nagano, Japan	3	9	0		
12	Billy Ken Kid	August 20, 2016	2016 Summer Explosion	Kobe, Hyōgo, Japan	1	30	1		
13	Yohei Nakajima	September 19, 2016	Korakuen Hall Taikai	Bunkyo, Tokyo, Japan	4	69	1		
14	Jiro Kuroshio	November 27, 2016	Zen Nihon Puroresu in Ryōgoku Kokugikan	Sumida, Tokyo, Japan	1	80	0		
—	Vacated	February 15, 2017	—	—	—	—	—	Kuroshio returned the title to AJPW after being sidelined with a knee injury.	
15	Jun Akiyama	March 12, 2017	Yume Ryoku! 2017 Dream Power Series	Bunkyo, Tokyo, Japan	1	490	10	Akiyama defeated Kenso to win the vacant title.	
16	Tajiri	July 15, 2018	2018 Summer Action Series	Tokyo, Japan	1	316	6		
17	Yoshitatsu	May 27, 2019	2019 Super Power Series	Gifu, Japan	1	587	9		
18	Jun Kasai	January 3, 2021	New Year Wars	Tokyo, Japan	1	74	1	This was a Tables, Ladders and Chairs match	
19	Shuji Ishikawa	March 18, 2021	Special Box Office Blood Fight: Jun Kasai vs. Shuji Ishikawa ~ Crazy Monkey vs. Giant	Tokyo, Japan	1	227	3	This was a Glass Board, Barbed Wire Board, Tables, Ladders & Chairs + α Deathmatch.	
20	Shigehiro Irie	October 31, 2021	Raising An Army Memorial Series 2021	Tokyo, Japan	1	218	2		
21	Izanagi	June 6, 2022	AJPW Dynamite Series 2022	Tokyo, Japan	1	13	0		
22	Toshizo	June 19, 2022	AJPW Champions 50th Anniversary	Tokyo, Japan	1	217	3	This was a four-way ladder match also involving Yusuke Kodama and Black Menso-re.	
23	Minoru Tanaka	January 22, 2023	AJPW New Year Giant Series 2023	Tokyo, Japan	1	345	3		
24	Black Menso-re	January 2, 2024	AJPW New Year Giant Series 2024	Tokyo, Japan	5	12	0	Menso-re was previously known as Yohei Nakajima.	
25	Seigo Tachibana	January 14, 2024	AJPW New Year Giant Series 2024 - Night 3	Tokyo, Japan	1	162	3		
26	Fuminori Abe	June 24, 2024	AJPW Dynamite Series 2024 - Night 1	Tokyo, Japan	1	120	2		
27	Seigo Tachibana	October 22, 2024	AJPW Raising An Army Memorial Series 2024 - Night 4	Tokyo, Japan	2	47	2		
28	Yuko Miyamoto	December 8, 2024	AJPW Real World Tag League 2024 - Night 11	Tokyo, Japan	1	189	4		
29	Takashi	June 15, 2025	AJPW Super Power Series 2025 - Night 3	Kyoto, Japan	1	100	2		
30	Kuroshio Tokyo Japan	September 23, 2025	AJPW Giant Dream 2025	Tokyo, Japan	2	35	0	This was a battle royal also involving Aizawa No. 1, Hokuto Omori, Kikutaro, Kumaarashi, Naruki Doi, Seigo Tachibana and Senor Saito. Kuroshio was previously known as Jiro Kuroshio.	
31	Shotaro Ashino	October 28, 2025	AJPW Hokkaido Dynamite Series 2025	Tokyo, Japan	1	67	1		
32	Daisuke Sekimoto	January 3, 2026	AJPW New Year Wars 2026	Tokyo, Japan	1	51	0		
33	Kuma Arashi	February 23, 2026	AJPW Excite Series 2026	Tokyo, Japan	1	160	1		
34	Masaaki Mochizuki	August 2, 2026	All Japan Pro Wrestling Festival 2026	Tokyo, Japan	1	93	1		
35	Oddyssey	August 2, 2026	Hokkaido Dynamite Series 2026	Sapporo, Japan	1	13+	0		

== Combined reigns ==
As of November 16, 2026.

†	Indicates the current champion

Rank	Wrestler	No. of reigns	Combined defenses	Combined days
1	Yoshitatsu	1	9	587
2	Jun Akiyama	1	10	490
3	Yohei Nakajima/Black Menso-re	5	4	417
4	Minoru Tanaka	1	3	345
5	Tajiri	1	6	316
6	Sushi	2	1	246
7	Seiya Sanada	1	7	232
8	Shuji Ishikawa	1	2	227
9	Shigehiro Irie	1	2	218
10	Toshizo	1	3	217
11	Kotaro Suzuki	1	4	211
12	Seigo Tachibana	2	5	209
13	Yuko Miyamoto	1	4	189
14	Kenso	1	3	172
15	Kuma Arashi	1	1	160
16	Fuminori Abe	1	2	120
17	Jiro Kuroshio/Kuroshio Tokyo Japan	2	0	115
18	René Duprée	1	21	107
19	Takashi	1	2	100
20	Masaaki Mochizuki	1	1	93
21	Jun Kasai	1	1	74
22	Shotaro Ashino	1	1	67
23	Daisuke Sekimoto	1	0	52
24	Billy Ken Kid	1	1	30
25	Takeshi Minamino	1	0	28
26	Izanagi	1	0	13
27	Oddyssey †	1	1	13+
28	Kazuhiro Tamura	1	0	6

== See also ==
- NJPW World Television Championship
