= René Duprée =

Canadian professional wrestler (born 1983)

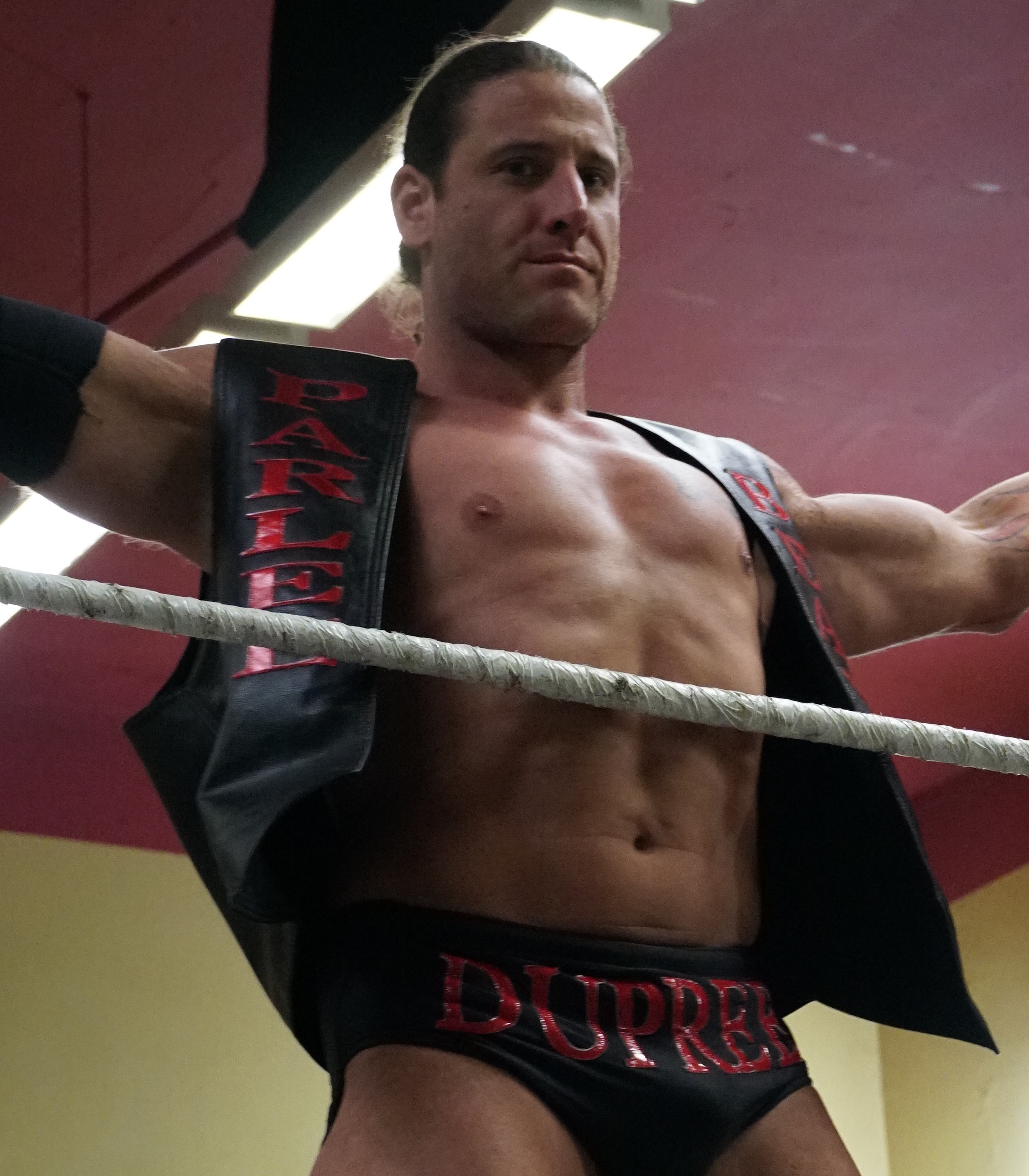
- Duprée in 2018

Personal information
- Born: René Goguen; December 15, 1983 (age 42) Moncton, New Brunswick, Canada
- Spouse: Kanako Goguen (m. 2009)
- Family: Emile Duprée (father)

Professional wrestling career
- Ring name(s): René Duprée; Gedon; Geddon; René Bonaparte; René E. Duprée; René Rougeau
- Billed height: 6 ft 3 in (191 cm)
- Billed weight: 260 lb (118 kg)
- Billed from: Paris, France; Quebec
- Trained by: Emile Duprée
- Debut: 1997

YouTube information
- Channel: Cafe de Rene with Rene Dupree
- Years active: 2021–present
- Genre: Professional wrestling
- Subscribers: 34.3 thousand
- Views: 14.1 million
- Last updated: August 19, 2025

René Goguen (born December 15, 1983), better known by his ring name René Duprée (French: [ʁəne dypʁe]; Japanese: レネ・デュプリ, romanized: Rene Dyupuri) is a Canadian professional wrestler and podcaster. Goguen is best known for his tenure in World Wrestling Entertainment, where he is a one-time World Tag Team Champion with Sylvain Grenier as the tag team La Résistance and a one-time WWE Tag Team Champion with Kenzo Suzuki. He has also worked for Japanese promotions All Japan Pro Wrestling, Wrestle-1 and Hustle.

He is the first wrestler in WWE to win a title as a teenager. Goguen is the son of Canadian Maritimes wrestling promoter Emile Duprée.

== Professional wrestling career ==
=== Early career (1997–2002) ===
Goguen started professional wrestling in 1997 for his father's promotion Grand Prix Wrestling in New Brunswick.

=== World Wrestling Federation/Entertainment (2002–2007) ===
==== Heartland Wrestling Association and Ohio Valley Wrestling (2002–2003) ====
In April 2002 Goguen signed with the World Wrestling Federation making him the youngest wrestler to sign with the WWF at the age of 18. On April 27, 2002, Goguen debuted under the ringname, René Duprée, after his father, for Heartland Wrestling Association when he defeated EZ Money. Then on October 9, 2002, defeating Johnny Jeter for Ohio Valley Wrestling. Duprée would team up with various wrestlers in dark matches on SmackDown! and Raw, while also competing in Ohio Valley Wrestling until April 2003. His first match in WWE was on November 12, 2002 in a dark match on Velocity when he lost to Chris Kanyon.

==== La Résistance (2003–2004) ====
After weeks of vignettes airing, Sylvain Grenier and Duprée made their first appearance on the April 28, 2003, episode of Raw as La Résistance by attacking Scott Steiner. Steiner had made remarks two weeks earlier comparing France to hell and Grenier and Duprée were offended. La Résistance went on to feud with Scott Steiner and Test, who was forced to be Steiner's tag team partner by Stacy Keibler. La Résistance ended up defeating Steiner and Test at Judgment Day on May 18, 2003, in the team's pay-per-view debut.

On June 15, 2003, La Résistance won the World Tag Team Championship from Kane and Rob Van Dam at Bad Blood, making Duprée the youngest wrestler in WWE history to not only win the World Tag Team Championship, but any championship in the company's history at 19 years old. As a result of winning the title, he became the first teenager in the history of the WWE that has won a championship. Duprée held on to this distinction until April 2018, when Nicholas won the WWE Raw Tag Team Championship at WrestleMania 34 at the age of 10.

The third member of La Résistance, Rob Conway, was originally introduced as an unnamed American serviceman being abused by Grenier and Duprée. On the August 18 episode of Raw, when The Dudley Boyz came out to attack La Résistance, they brought Conway into the ring with an American flag. Once the Dudley Boyz had their backs turned, Conway attacked the Dudley Boyz with the American flag and then tore it off the pole and laid it on top of them. Conway, now renamed to Robért Conway, joined Duprée and Grenier and the trio began carrying the French flag to ringside and singing the French national anthem before their matches. La Résistance lost the World Tag Team Championship to the Dudley Boyz at Unforgiven in a three-on-two handicapped tables match. The trio went on to feud with several tag teams, including the Dudley Boyz, The Hurricane and Rosey, and Garrison Cade and Mark Jindrak.

In October 2003, Grenier suffered a back injury, resulting in Duprée and Conway holding the tag team together. At Armageddon, La Résistance competed in a Tag Team Turmoil match for the World Tag Team Championship which was won by Ric Flair and Batista. At the Royal Rumble, Duprée competed in the 30-man Royal Rumble match where he eliminated Matt Hardy before getting eliminated by Rikishi. At WrestleMania XX, La Résistance (Duprée and Conway) competed in a Fatal four-way tag team match for the World Tag Team Championship but failed to win the titles. Grenier returned in March 2004, thus reuniting the trio. The reunion did not last long, as Duprée was drafted to the SmackDown! brand in the 2004 WWE Draft Lottery on the March 22 episode of Raw.

==== Championship pursuits (2004–2005) ====
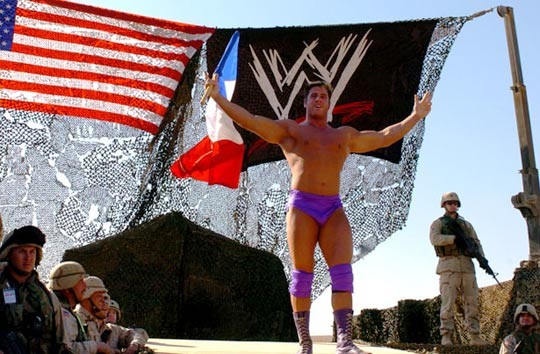
Duprée performing at the 2004 Tribute to the Troops in Iraq

Duprée made his SmackDown! debut on the March 25, 2004, episode of SmackDown!, defeating Billy Kidman. He briefly had a talk show on SmackDown!, called "Cafe de René", but his only guest was Torrie Wilson as the segment was cancelled after only one night. Duprée wrestled Wilson to a draw on the April 29 edition of SmackDown!. For several months, pursued the United States Championship, held by John Cena. After an incident that happened during his "Cafe de René" (the same incident involving Torrie Wilson), Duprée challenged Cena to a championship match. The match was granted by SmackDown! general manager Kurt Angle and it took place at Judgment Day. Cena retained the championship at Judgment Day when he pinned Duprée after executing an F-U. At The Great American Bash, Duprée competed in a Four-way elimination match for the United States Championship which saw Cena retain once again.

After losing to Cena, he focused on the WWE Tag Team Championship and eventually won the title with Kenzo Suzuki by defeating Billy Kidman and Paul London on the September 9 episode of SmackDown! (making him the youngest man to win the WWE Tag Team Championship at age 20). At No Mercy, Duprée and Suzuki defeated Rob Van Dam and Rey Mysterio to retain the WWE Tag Team Championship. They lost the WWE Tag Team Championship on the December 9 episode of SmackDown! to Van Dam and Mysterio. This match happened just days before Van Dam and Mysterio were to challenge Duprée and Suzuki at Armageddon. At Armageddon, Duprée and Suzuki lost to Van Dam and Mysterio in a rematch. At the 2005 Royal Rumble, Duprée competed in the 30-man Royal Rumble match where he was eliminated by Chris Jericho.

On the March 24, 2005, airing of SmackDown!, he was "sacrificed" by The Undertaker as a message to Randy Orton (regarding their match at WrestleMania 21), when The Undertaker interrupted a match between Duprée and Booker T. The result of the "sacrifice" saw Duprée receiving a Tombstone Piledriver on the steel steps which lead up to the ring. Duprée was taken off television after this, working dark matches until the April 28 edition of SmackDown!, where he was defeated by John Cena. Duprée went back to dark matches and a few Velocity matches until the June 18 episode of Velocity, where Duprée came out calling himself "The French Phenom", defeating Mark Jindrak via submission. The following week on Velocity, Duprée came out with a new look, sporting black trunks with his initials as well as jet black hair and a Dalí-styled goatee.

==== Brand switches (2005–2007) ====
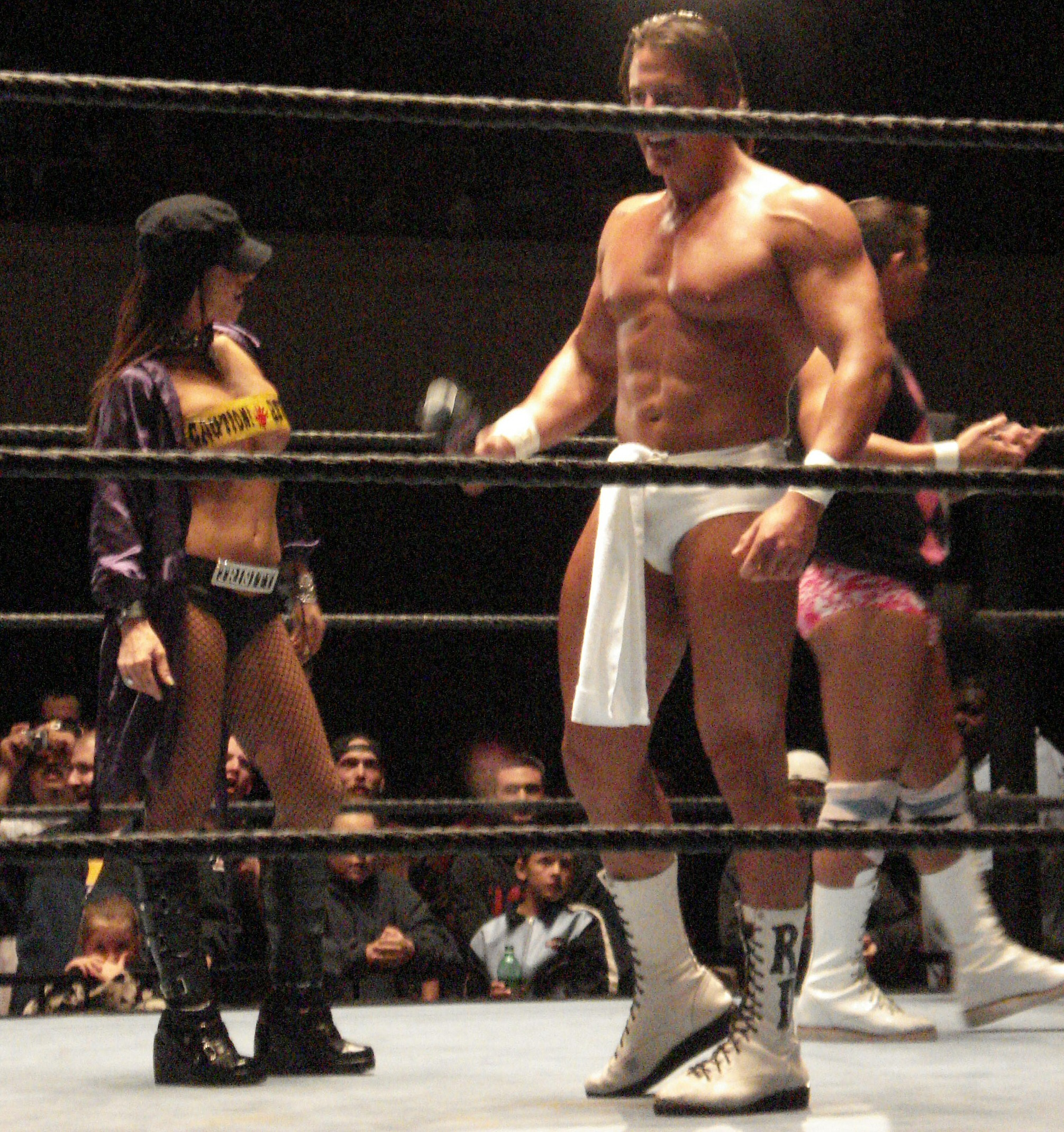
Duprée during his time on the ECW brand

On June 30, Duprée became one of the last minute trades in the 2005 WWE Draft Lottery, which saw him jump from SmackDown! back to Raw. On the July 4 edition of Raw, Duprée redebuted with his French Phenom gimmick and defeated Val Venis on the same night. Duprée began cutting promos using a new quote referring to himself as "Simply Phenomenal". Duprée also began a winning streak against superstars such as The Hurricane, Matt Striker and Tajiri before suffering a near career-ending hernia in mid-September.

Once Duprée was cleared to wrestle, WWE sent him back to Ohio Valley Wrestling for training before returning to WWE. On October 19, 2005, Duprée returned to OVW facing Robert Fury in a no-contest. On February 21, 2007, La Resistance defeated Kofi Kingston and David Hart Smith in what would be Duprée's final appearance in OVW.

On the August 8, 2006, episode of ECW on Sci Fi, a promo aired with Duprée, sporting a clean shave and long hair, announcing that he would be debuting for the ECW brand soon. Promos aired throughout the rest of August showing Duprée taking pictures, posing in mirrors, and working out, while claiming he is "the most extreme athlete in ECW history". Duprée made his ECW debut on September 12, 2006, defeating Balls Mahoney. On the February 20, 2007, episode of ECW on Sci Fi, Duprée reformed La Résistance with Sylvain Grenier, but the team's reunion was short-lived after Duprée was suspended at the start of March and sent to rehab after violating the Health and Wellness policy.

Duprée returned to the ring at WWE's new developmental territory Florida Championship Wrestling on June 26, 2007, and defeated Steve Madison. However, he was released from his WWE contract a month later on July 26, 2007, by his own request. In an interview with Chris Van Vliet in 2021, Duprée revealed the Chris Benoit double-murder and suicide was his main reason for leaving the company.

=== Independent circuit (2007–2012) ===
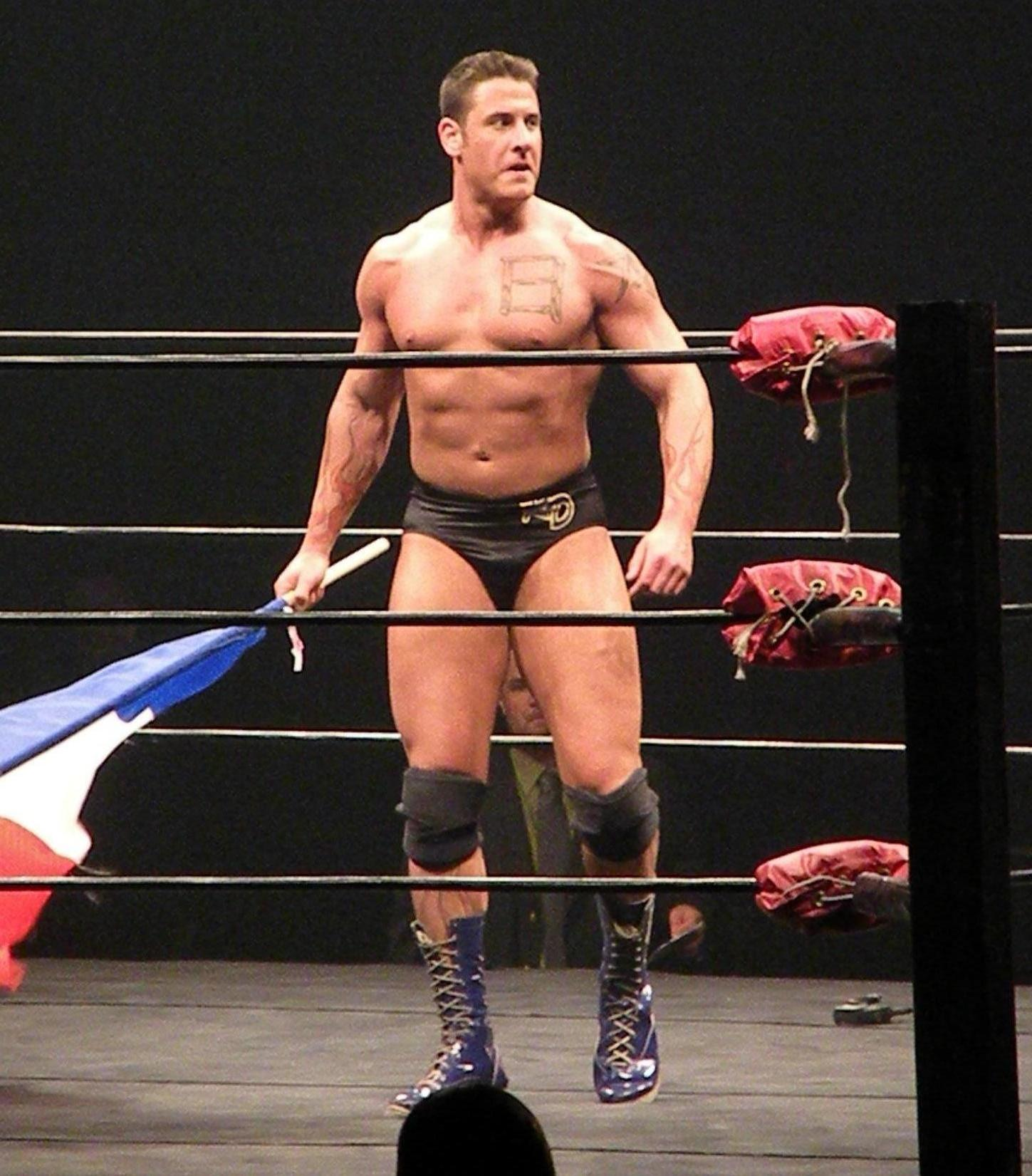
Duprée during American Wrestling Rampage tour

After leaving WWE, Goguen wrestled primarily on the European independent circuit and Japan. He made his debut for All Star Wrestling on January 25, 2008, defeating Mikey Whiplash. During his tenure at ASW, he formed a partnership with fellow French Canadian, Pierre Carl Ouellet. In March 2008, Duprée wrestled for Irish Whip Wrestling where he fought Mandrake for the IWW International Heavyweight Championship. In July 2008, he represented Europe in the Grand Prix Tournament. In September 2008, Duprée returned to Europe for several months where he won European Wrestling Promotion Royal Rumble and wrestled regularly for American Wrestling Rampage. In March 2009, Duprée defeated Rob Van Dam for the AWR No Limits Championship and would vacate it after two days when he was awarded the AWR Heavyweight Championship. On November 24, Duprée lost the AWR Heavyweight Championship to RVD in a best of two falls match but would regain the title on December 9. Duprée re-united La Resistance with Sylvain Grenier for AWR France 2010 Tour. After leaving AJPW, Duprée wrestled on the European independent circuit only and won the Southside Heavyweight Championship in a triple threat match. However his time in Europe came to an end when he returned to Canada.

On November 11, 2012, made his debut on the American independent circuit when Duprée lost to the Dynamic Sensation in a four corners match which also included Dan Maff and Devon Moore for Pro Wrestling Syndicate in Rahway, New Jersey. In May, Rene and his father restarted Grand Prix Wrestling and featured talent from All Japan Pro Wrestling and other assorted talent.

=== Hustle (2007–2009) ===
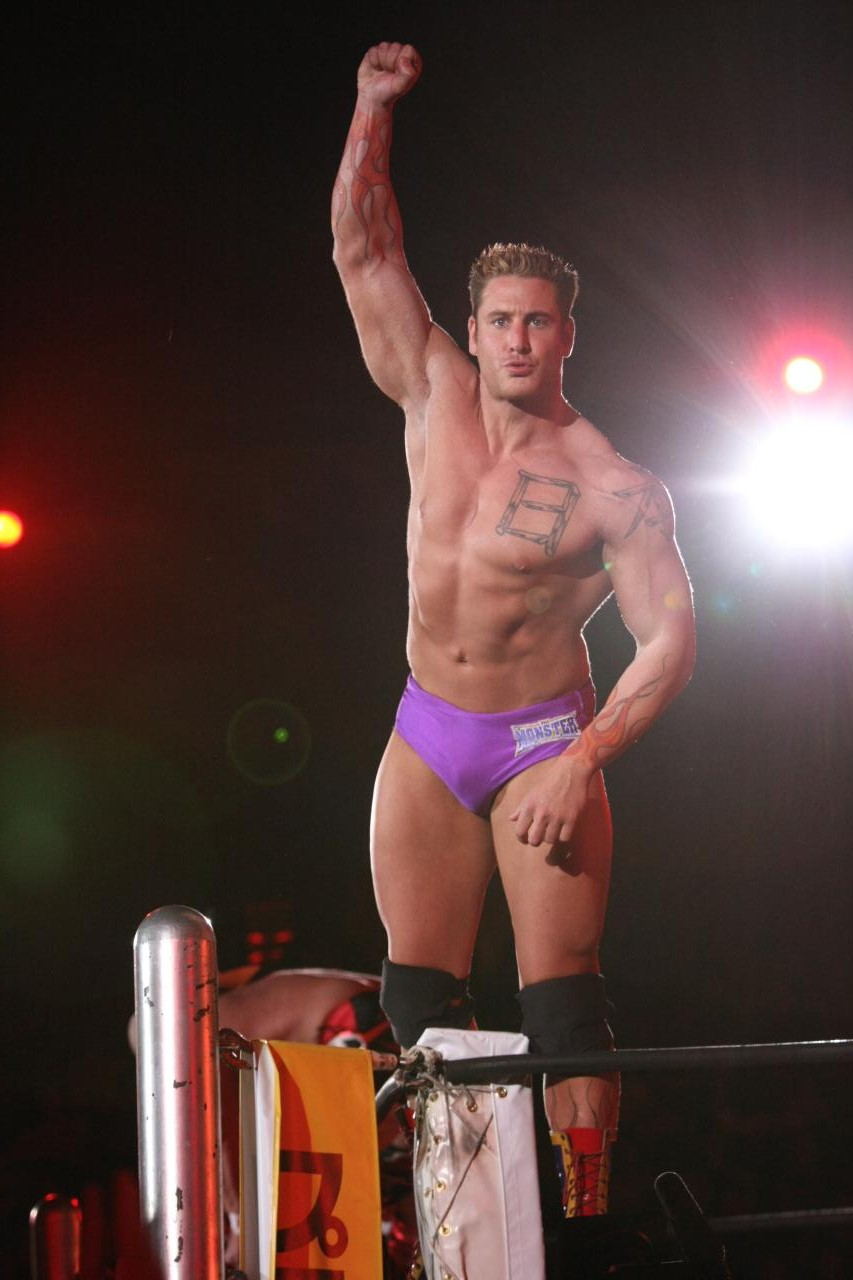
Goguen during his time in Hustle

Goguen debuted for the Japanese promotion Hustle on August 15, 2007, under the name "René Bonaparte", defeating fellow WWE alumnus Tajiri. After debuting, René became a member of President Nobuhiko Takada's Takada Monster Army thus continuing his winning streak. Bonaparte and Wataru wrestled their grudge match was on September 22, with the stipulation being that Wataru's wife, Eiko, was to become the wife of the winner of the match. Bonaparte defeated his tag team partner Sakata via disqualification, thus winning Eiko.

After a brief hiatus, Bonaparte made his return to the promotion in January 2008 and defeated Tajiri. His undefeated streak came to an end on January 17, when he and Giant Vabo lost to Tajiri and Kushida. In July 2008, he lost the first round of the Hustle GP to Toshiaki Kawada. Goguen debuted a new masked gimmick, Dina Sharp, and teamed with Mighty Sharp, this gimmick didn't last long with them dropping the gimmick after only two shows. In April to May 2009, Bonaparte teamed with Lance Cade and stayed undefeated in tag team matches until they lost twice to Tajiri and Magnum Tokyo. In June, Bonaparte teamed with Travis Tomko as Armageddon, where Tomko was named Arma and Bonaparte was named Geddon. In July, Geddon turned on Arma and reverted to his René Bonaparte name before defeating Arma. Goguen wrestled his final match for Hustle on October 10, where his team lost a five-on-five tag team match.

=== All Japan Pro Wrestling (2008, 2010–2011, 2013) ===
On June 22, 2008, Goguen debuted for All Japan Pro Wrestling under his René Duprée ring name and defeated Manabu Soya. During his short stint in 2008 he aligned himself with the Voodoo Murders stable where he teamed up with TARU mostly.

On January 2, 2010, Duprée returned to AJPW and rejoined Voodoo Murders by filling in the final spot for a Voodoo Murders vs Gurentai tag team match which he lost, later on in the night he lost a seventeen-man battle royal. In April, he participated in 2010's Champion Carnival, where he won only one match upon defeating Taiyō Kea. On September 20, 2010, Duprée and former tag team partner Kenso were defeated by Akebono and Taiyō Kea in a match for the World Tag Team Championship. From November 20 to December 7, Duprée teamed with TARU in the 2010 World's Strongest Tag Determination League, where they finished seventh in their bracket. On June 3, 2011, AJPW disbanded Voodoo Murders, suspended all of its Japanese members, including Duprée, and vacated all championships following the aftermath of a backstage fight between Yoshikazu Taru and Nobukazu Hirai, which resulted in Hirai suffering a stroke. In the aftermath of this, Duprée and former Voodoo Murders member Joe Doering stayed together as a tag team until the end of Duprée's run with AJPW. At the joint pay-per-view All Together, which featured wrestlers from AJPW, Pro Wrestling Noah and New Japan Pro-Wrestling, Duprée participated in the Destroyer Cup battle royal, which was ultimately won by Kentaro Shiga.

During an AJPW international tour in Cocagne, New Brunswick, Canada on May 27, 2013, Duprée defeated Seiya Sanada to win the Gaora TV Championship. However, he returned the title to AJPW on September 11 after leaving the promotion to begin performing for Wrestle-1.

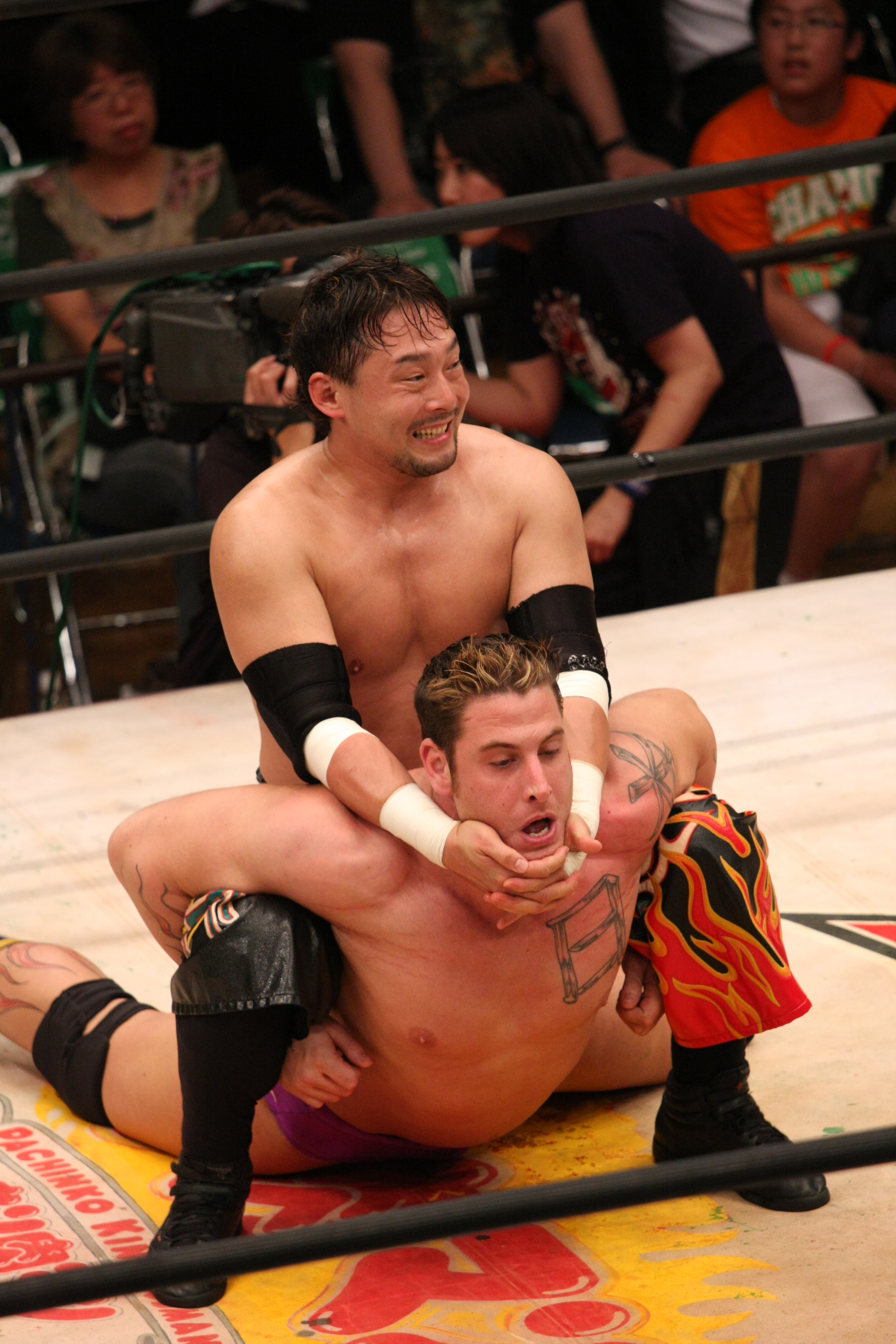
Yoshihiro Tajiri performing a camel clutch on Duprée.

=== Wrestle-1 (2013–2014, 2019–2020) ===
While still officially the Gaora TV Champion, Duprée made a surprise appearance at the AJPW splinter promotion Wrestle-1's inaugural event on September 8, 2013, teaming with Zodiac in a main event tag team match, where the two were defeated by Bob Sapp and Keiji Mutoh. Three days later, after Duprée had been announced for all future Wrestle-1 events, he returned the Gaora TV Championship to AJPW. During the October tour, Duprée joined Masayuki Kono's Desperado stable. On March 2, 2014, Duprée took part in the big Kaisen: Outbreak event, teaming with Desperado member Masayuki Kono and Samoa Joe losing to Rob Terry, Keiji Mutoh and Taiyō Kea in a six-man tag team match. On March 15, Duprée competed in a battle royal to determine the number one contender for the TNA X Division Championship, which was won by Seiki Yoshioka.

Duprée was due to return to Wrestle-1 on September 1, 2019, as part of the Pro Wrestling Love in Yokohama event but was unable to attend due to flight trouble. Enfants Terribles leader Shotaro Ashino announced that Duprée had joined the faction. On September 15, 2019, Duprée teamed with Ashino, Kuma Arashi and Yusuke Kodama in a losing effort. He teamed with Arashi in the 2019 Wrestle-1 Tag League, going undefeated in the round robin portion of the tournament before losing to T-Hawk and Shigehiro Irie in the final. Wrestle-1 financial issues meant Duprée would not return to the promotion and would eventually close on April 1, 2020.

=== Return to the independent circuit (2015–present) ===
On January 24, 2015, Duprée made his first post Wrestle-1 appearance for the Canadian Wrestling Federation (CWF) defeating Tyson Dux.

On May 20, 2015, Duprée began touring with his father promotion Atlantic Grand Prix Wrestling from May 2015 through August 2015. On April 29, 2017, Duprée defeated Hannibal to become the new GNW Canadian Champion as part of the 2017 AGPW tour in O'Leary, Prince Edward Island.

On May 26, 2017, Duprée competed for What Culture Pro Wrestling as part of their World Cup tournament where he was defeated by Michael Elgin due to disqualification in the first round of the Canadian qualifier.

On June 30, 2017, Duprée unsuccessfully defended his GNW Canadian Championship in a three-way elimination match against Wes Brisco and Hannibal, Brisco went on to win the championship.

On August 12, 2017, Duprée and Sylvain Grenier defeated Kryss Thorn and Scotty O'Shea to win the Canadian Wrestling Federation Tag Team Championship in Niagara Falls, Ontario.

On February 9, 2018, Duprée debuted in Singapore Pro Wrestling (SPW) at SPW Repentless, but was defeated by "The Statement" Andruew Tang.

From April to June 2018, Duprée worked in Europe in Germany, Belgium, France, and the United Kingdom. That summer, he returned to Canada, working in Newfoundland and Montreal and then that fall returned to the United Kingdom.

During 2019 Dupree worked in Europe, Montreal and Eastern Canada. Then returned to Japan that fall and worked threre for a year. He then took a hiatus from wrestling for a year between July 2020 and August 2021 due to the COVID-19 pandemic.

He returned to in August 2021 in Kingston, Ontario for Great North Wrestling when he defeated Rex Atkins in the afternoon show and the evening show losing to Blood Hunter.

In September 2023, Dupree reunited with Grienier at North Carolina's Fortitude Wrestling Entertainment. A month later, they wrestled in Montreal at Les Promotions J/R L'Invasion De l'Est 13 where they defeated the Monkey Family and Le Changement. On November 4, 2023 Dupree defeated GNW Canadian Champion Magnum McLaren by disqualification for Great North Wrestling in Renfrew, Ontario.

On July 12, 2024, Dupree lost to former WWE wrestler Chavo Guerrero Jr. in the Coupe Jean Corne 2024 for Association Biterroise de Catch in Beziers, France.

During the fall of 2024 Dupree returned to England and worked there for two months. He also wrestled in Austria and Romania.

In 2025, he wrestled for Canadian Wrestling's Elite in Saskatchewan and Manitoba where he feuded with Bobby Sharp.

=== Pro Wrestling Noah (2020–2022) ===
Duprée signed with Pro Wrestling Noah as a member of Takashi Sugiura's Sugiura-gun stable. He made his in-ring debut teaming with fellow Sugiura-gun member, El Hijo de Dr. Wagner Jr. to defeat Kenoh and Masa Kitamiya. Duprée and Hijo de Dr. Wagner Jr. would enter in the Global Tag League, where they won by defeating AXIZ in the finals. On April 19, 2020, they defeated Naomichi Marufuji and Masaaki Mochizuki to win the GHC Tag Team Championship. On July 26, 2020, it was announced that Duprée and Wagner Jr. vacated the GHC Tag Team Championships.

On April 30, 2022, Duprée made his return after a near two year absence due to the COVID-19 pandemic teaming with Wagner Jr. defeating the team of Daiki Inaba and Masato Tanaka. On May 4, 2022, Duprée and Wagner Jr. defeated Takashi Sugiura and Hideki Suzuki to reclaim the GHC Tag Team Championships they previously were forced to vacate. On May 21, 2022, Duprée and Wagner Jr. lost the GHC Tag Team Championships to the team of Michael Elgin and Masa Kitamiya.

== Personal life ==
Goguen's father, Emile, was also a professional wrestler and a promoter.

After leaving WWE, Goguen adopted several tattoos, including flame patterns on his forearms and lower legs, the kanji characters for Japan (日本) on his left deltoid and pectoral, and a large crucifix spanning across his back.

On October 14, 2009, Goguen married in Japan.

He previously hosted a podcast titled Cafe De Rene.

== Championships and accomplishments ==
=== Bodybuilding ===
- Mr. Canada Bodybuilding National Champion (2001)

=== Professional wrestling ===
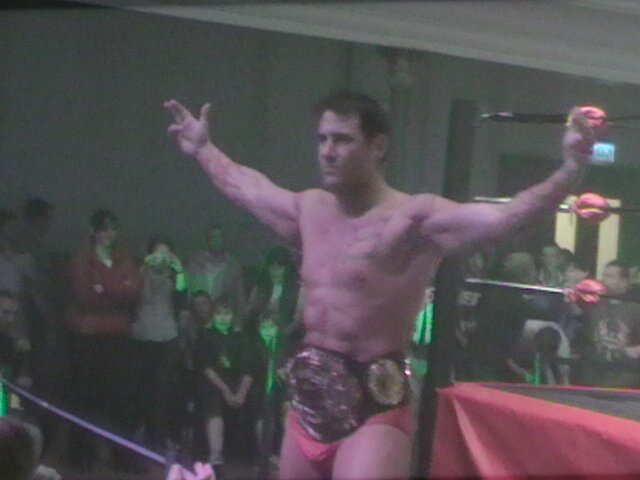
Rene as AWR Heavyweight Champion in August 2009

- All Japan Pro Wrestling
  - Gaora TV Championship (1 time)
- American Wrestling Rampage
  - AWR Heavyweight Championship (2 times)
  - AWR No Limits Championship (1 time)
- Canadian Wrestling Federation
  - CWF Tag Team Championship (1 time) – with Sylvain Grenier
- Federation de Lutte Quebecoise
  - FLQ Tag Team Championship (1 time) – with The Beast King FTM
- Fortitude Wrestling Entertainment
  - FWE Tag Team Championship (1 time) - with Sylvain Grenier
- Great North Wrestling
  - GNW Canadian Championship (1 time)
- Pro Wrestling Noah
  - GHC Tag Team Championship (2 times) – with El Hijo de Dr. Wagner Jr.
  - Global Tag League (2020) – with El Hijo de Dr. Wagner Jr.
- Southside Wrestling Entertainment
  - SWE Heavyweight Championship (1 time)
- Ultimate Championship Wrestling
  - UCW Tag Team Championship (1 time) - with Sylvain Grenier
- World Wrestling Entertainment
  - World Tag Team Championship (1 time) – with Sylvain Grenier
  - WWE Tag Team Championship (1 time) – with Kenzo Suzuki
- Wrestling Observer Newsletter
  - Worst Tag Team (2003) with Sylvain Grenier
