= IWRG Guerra de Campeones =

2011 International Wrestling Revolution Group event

Guerra de Campeones (2011)
- Official poster of the event depicting several of the participants
- Promotion(s): International Wrestling Revolution Group; Promociones Wagner
- Date: December 25, 2011
- City: Naucalpan, State of Mexico
- Venue: Arena Naucalpan

Event chronology
← Previous; Arena Naucalpan 34th Anniversary Show	Next → IWRG 16th Anniversary Show

Guerra de Campeones (2011) (Spanish for "War of the Champions") was a professional wrestling event produced and scripted collaboratively by International Wrestling Revolution Group (IWRG) and Promociones Wagner. It took place on December 25, 2011, at Arena Naucalpan in Naucalpan, State of Mexico, IWRG's main venue. The event featured six professional wrestling matches with different wrestlers involved in pre-existing scripted feuds or storylines.

Five of the six matches had a championship on the line, including the main event where La Parka and Octagón defended the Mexican National Tag Team Championship against Chessman and Silver Cain in a steel cage match. That match marked the first time in several years that the Mexican National Tag Team Championship had been defended. The show also featured title defenses from other wrestling promotions such as Xtreme Mexican Wrestling (XMW Mixed Tag Team Championship) and Desastre Total Ultraviolento (DTU Extreme Championship) in addition to the IWRG promoted IWRG Intercontinental Heavyweight Championship and Distrito Federal Trios Championship.

== Production ==
=== Background ===
Professional wrestling has a long running tradition of holding shows that feature several championship matches, and at times actually promotes shows as an "all championship matches" show. The earliest documented "All-Championship" show is the EMLL Carnaval de Campeones ("Carnival of Champions") held on January 13, 1965. In 2007 WWE held a pay-per-view called Vengeance: Night of Champions, making WWE Night of Champions a recurring theme. Starting in 2008 the Mexican lucha libre promotion International Wrestling Revolution Group (IWRG) has held a regular major show labeled Caravana de Campeones, Spanish for "Caravan of Champions" using the same concept for a major annual show. In 2011 IWRG joined together with Dr. Wagner Jr.'s Promociones Wagner to present Guerra de Campeones ("War of the Champions"), featuring champions representing a number of different promotions, not just IWRG.

=== Storylines ===
The event featured six professional wrestling matches with different wrestlers, where some were involved in pre-existing scripted feuds or storylines and others simply put together by the matchmakers without a backstory. Being a professional wrestling event matches are not won legitimately through athletic competition; they are instead won via predetermined outcomes to the matches that are kept secret from the general public. Wrestlers portrayed either heels (the bad guys, referred to as Rudos in Mexico) or faces (fan favorites or Técnicos in Mexico).

For the Guerra de Campeones show IWRG and Promociones Wagner invited the Xtreme Mexican Wrestling's Mixed Tag Team Champions Ojo Diabolico, Jr. and Ludark Shaitan to compete and defend the championship on their show against the mixed-gender team of Dement Xtreme and Sexy Lady (Ludark Shaitan cousin). Ojo Diabloico Jr. and Ludark had won the mixed tag team championship on September 1, 2011, from their now-challengers Dement Xtreme and Sexy Lady. This would be their first defense of the championship.

On April 29, 2010 the trio known as Los Gringos VIP (Avisman, El Hijo del Diablo and Gringo Loco) won the Distrito Federal Trios Championship by defeating the team of Máscara Año 2000, Máscara Año 2000 Jr. and El Hijo de Máscara Año 2000 in the finals of a tournament for the vacant championship. Initially it looked like the Máscara Año 2000 trio team had won the match and the championship, but Lucha Libre AAA World Wide (AAA) wrestler Silver King, who was watching from the front row, informed the referee that the team had used an illegal move to win the match, thus reversing the decision, making Los Gringos VIP the Distrito Federal Trios Champions instead. The appearance of Silver King started a long running story-line rivalry between IWRG and AAA, including the Guerra de Campeones show. Los Gringos VIP defended the championship on several occasions in 2010, including victories over trios such as Los Terribles Cerebros (Black Terry, Cerebro Negro and Dr. Cerebro) twice and Mike Segura teaming up with Trauma I and Trauma II. In 2011 the title was inactive as Gringo Loco returned to the US and did not work for IWRG on a regular basis, leaving the fate of the Distrito Federal Trios Championship in limbo. In late November IWRG announced that the Distrito Federal Trios Championship would be defended by Avisman, El Hijo del Diablo and Apolo Estrada Jr., allowing Estrada to take over from Gringo Loco.

Another promotion that IWRG and Promotiones Wagner reached out to was Desastre Total Ultraviolento (DTU), a Mexican Hardcore wrestling promotion. For the show DTU send their DTU Extreme Champion Joe Líder to IWRG to defend the championship against Súper Mega, Último Gladiador and Violento Jack in a Four-Way no-disqualification elimination Match. Líder had won the championship on December 18, 2010 when he defeated Zumbi on a DTU show in Tlalnepantla, Mexico State. Líder had previously defended the DTU Extreme Championship against IWRG mainstay Dr. Cerebro on an IWRG show.

The second IWRG championship to be defended on the Guerra de Campeones show was the IWRG Intercontinental Heavyweight Championship. The defending champion going into the show was Taboo, who had defeated Silver King, in a steel cage match that also included Dr. Wagner Jr. and La Parka, on October 16, 2011. The match itself reportedly lasted close to an hour and saw several wrestlers interfered before Taboo won the championship.

The Mexican National Tag Team Championship was established in 1957, making it one of the earliest examples of a tag team championship. Over the years the championship was primarily promoted by Empresa Mexicana de Lucha Libre ("Mexican Wrestling Enterprise"; EMLL) and held by famous teams such as Los Hermanos Shadow (Blue Demon and Black Shadow), Los Rebeldes ("The Rebels"; Rene Guajardo and Karloff Lagarde), Rayo de Jalisco and El Santo and La Ola Blanca (Dr. Wagner and Ángel Blanco). In 1993 then champions Los Destructores (Tony Arce and Rocco Valente) left EMLL to join AAA, bringing with them the Mexican National Tag Team Championship. From that point on it was promoted almost exclusively by AAA. Around 2007 AAA stopped promotion the Mexican National Tag Team Championship and introduced the AAA World Tag Team Championship, at which point the Mexican championship became inactive. Champions La Parka and Octagón revealed that they still had the championship belts in 2011, with IWRG deciding to make the return of the championship the main event of their Guerra de Campeones interpromotional show.

== Results ==
No.	Results	Stipulations
1	Blazer, The Mummy and Tiger Lee defeated Charly Madrid, La Chiva and Miss Gaviota	Best two-out-of-three falls six-man tag team match
2	Dement Xtreme and Sexy Lady defeated Ojo Diabolico, Jr. and Ludark Shaitan (C)	Mixed Tag Team Match for the XMW Mixed Tag Team Championship
3	Los Gringos VIP (Apolo Estrada, Jr., Avisman and El Hijo del Diablo) (C) defeated Los Exóticos AAA (Pasion Crystal, Polvo de Estrellas and Yuriko)	Six-Man Tag Team Lumberjack Strap Match for the Distrito Federal Trios Championship
4	Súper Mega defeated Joe Líder (C), Último Gladiador and Violento Jack: Último Gladiador is eliminated by Joe Líder; Violento Jack is eliminated by Súper Mega; Joe Líder is eliminated by Súper Mega	Four-Way Elimination Match for the DTU Extreme Championship
5	Headhunter A defeated Electroshock and Taboo (C)	Three-Way Bull Terrier Match for the IWRG Intercontinental Heavyweight Championship
6	La Parka and Octagón (C) defeated Chessman and Silver Cain	Tag Team Steel Cage Match for the Mexican National Tag Team Championship
