= Arena Naucalpan 35th Anniversary Show =

2012 International Wrestling Revolution Group event

- Official poster for the event showing all the cage match participants
- Promotion: International Wrestling Revolution Group
- Date: December 20, 2012
- City: Naucalpan, State of Mexico
- Venue: Arena Naucalpan
- Tagline(s): Lucha del Fin del Mundo, Guerra de familias en Jaula (Wrestling to the end of the world, War of the families in a cage)

Event chronology
← Previous; Prisión Fatal	Next → IWRG 17th Anniversary Show

Arena Naucalpan Anniversary Shows chronology
← Previous; 34th Anniversary	Next → 36th Anniversary

The Arena Naucalpan 35th Anniversary Show was an annual professional wrestling major event produced by Mexican professional wrestling promotion International Wrestling Revolution Group (IWRG), which took place on December 20, 2012 in Arena Naucalpan, Naucalpan, State of Mexico, Mexico. The show celebrated the 35th Anniversary of the construction of Arena Naucalpann, IWRG's main venue. The main event was a five team steel cage match contested under elimination rules. The teams were La Familia de Tijuana (Damian 666 and X-Fly), Los Hermanos Dinamita, Jr. (Hijo de Máscara Año 2000 and Máscara Año 2000, Jr.) and the father/son duos of Dr. Wagner, Jr. and El Hijo de Dr. Wagner, Jr., El Canek and El Canek, Jr. and Los Piratas (Hijo de Pirata Morgan and Pirata Morgan). Damian 666 was originally slated to team with his son Bestia 666, but was replaced by X-Fly. The match was contested under escape rules, which meant that the last team member in the ring would be the loser. Dr. Wagner, Jr. as well as Los Infierno Rockers and Los Psycho Circus who worked on the under card all appeared through IWRG's working relationship with fellow Mexican wrestling promotion AAA. The undercard also saw the continuation of the storyline feud between Fuerza Guerrera and Black Terry as well as a Torneo cibernetico elimination match between a team representing IWRG's wrestling school and a team representing Fuerza Guerrera's school Gimnasio Konkreto.

== Production ==
=== Background ===
Promoter Adolfo Moreno had promoted Lucha Libre, or professional wrestling in Naucalpan, State of Mexico, Mexico prior to financing the building of Arena Naucalpan that opened in late 1976. Originally Moreno worked together with the Universal Wrestling Association (UWA) and then later Consejo Mundial de Lucha Libre (CMLL) as a local promoter. On January 1, 1996 Moreno created International Wrestling Revolution Group (IWRG) as an independent promotion. IWRG celebrates the anniversary of Arena Naucalpan each year in December with a major show, making it the second oldest, still promoted show series in the world. pre-dating WrestleMania by eight years. Only the CMLL Anniversary Show series has a longer history. The 2012 Arena Naucalpan anniversary show marked the 35th Anniversary of Arena Naucalpab. The Anniversary show, as well as the majority of the IWRG shows in general are held in Arena Naucalpan.

=== Storylines ===
The event featured five professional wrestling matches with different wrestlers involved in pre-existing scripted feuds, plots and storylines. Wrestlers were portrayed as either heels (referred to as rudos in Mexico, those that portray the "bad guys") or faces (técnicos in Mexico, the "good guy" characters) as they followed a series of tension-building events, which culminated in a wrestling match or series of matches.

== Results ==
No.	Results	Stipulations
1	Gimnasio Konkreto (Boycot, Fleeyzer, Halcon Diabolico, John Crazy, Kiwby, Mr. Leo, Rey Espacial and Rey Tabu) defeated Gimnasio Naucalpan (Alan Extreme, Centvrión, Dinamic Black, Eita, Eterno, Imposible, Saruman and Violencia., Jr.)	Copa Higher Power 16-man Torneo cibernetico Match
2	Black Terry defeated Fuerza Guerrera – two falls to none	Best two-out-of-three falls singles match
3	Los Inferno Rockers (Devil Rocker, Machine Rocker and Soul Rocker) vs. Los Oficiales (Oficial 911, Oficial AK-47 and Oficial Fierro) ended in a draw	Super Libre best two-out-of-three falls six-man tag team match
4	Los Psycho Circus (Monster Clown, Murder Clown and Psycho Clown) defeated Cien Caras, Jr., Eterno and Headhunter A	Best two-out-of-three falls six-man tag team match
5	Dr. Wagner, Jr. and El Hijo de Dr. Wagner, Jr., El Canek and El Canek, Jr., La Familia de Tijuana (Damian 666 and X-Fly), Los Hermanos Dinamita, Jr. (Hijo de Máscara Año 2000 and Máscara Año 2000, Jr.) defeated Los Piratas (Hijo de Pirata Morgan and Pirata Morgan)	Five team steel cage match

Order of escape

1. El Canek and El Canek, Jr.
2. Los Hermanos Dinamita, Jr.
3. La Familia de Tijuana
4. El Hijo de Dr. Wagner, Jr.
5. Hijo de Pirata Morgan
6. Dr. Wagner, Jr.
