= IWRG 18th Anniversary Show =

2014 International Wrestling Revolution Group event

- Official poster for the 18th Anniversary with a picture of Vampiro
- Promotion: International Wrestling Revolution Group
- Date: January 1, 2014 (aired January 5, 2014)
- City: Naucalpan, State of Mexico
- Venue: Arena Naucalpan

Event chronology
| ← Previous; Arena Naucalpan 36th Anniversary Show | Next → El Protector |

IWRG Anniversary Shows chronology
| ← Previous; 17th Anniversary | Next → 19th Anniversary |

The IWRG 18th Anniversary Show was an annual professional wrestling major event produced by Mexican professional wrestling promotion International Wrestling Revolution Group (IWRG), which took place on January 1, 2014, in Arena Naucalpan, Naucalpan, State of Mexico, Mexico. The show commemorated the creation of the IWRG 18 years prior on January 1, 1996, when Adolfo "Pirata" Moreno took over running the wrestling in Arena Naucalpan and turned it into the IWRG. The main event featured the team of Lizmark, Jr., Vampiro Canadiense and Villano IV, three established wrestlers who had not worked for IWRG on a regular basis prior to the show taking on three IWRG full-time wrestlers in the team of Cien Caras, Jr., Super Nova and X-Fly. The show featured four additional matches.

== Production ==
=== Background ===
The 2014 International Wrestling Revolution Group (IWRG; Sometimes referred to as Grupo Internacional Revolución in Spanish) anniversary show commemorated the 18th anniversary of IWRG's creation as a wrestling promotion and holding their first show on January 1, 1996. The Anniversary show, as well as the majority of the IWRG shows in general are held in "Arena Naucalpan", owned by the promoters of IWRG and their main arena. The Anniversary Shows generally take place on January 1 each year whenever possible.

=== Storylines ===
The event featured five professional wrestling matches with different wrestlers involved in pre-existing scripted feuds, plots and storylines. Wrestlers were portrayed as either heels (referred to as rudos in Mexico, those that portray the "bad guys") or faces (técnicos in Mexico, the "good guy" characters) as they followed a series of tension-building events, which culminated in a wrestling match or series of matches.

== Results ==
| No. | Results | Stipulations |
|---|---|---|
| 1^{D} | Los Fulgores (Fulgor I and Fulgor II) defeated Emperador Azteca and Sky Angel | Tag team best two-out-of-three falls tag team match |
| 2 | Dragoncito de Oro and Mini Rey Cometa defeated Mini Dr. X and Mini Jocker | Tag team best two-out-of-three falls tag team match |
| 3 | Bombero Infernal, Centvrion and Dr. Cerebro defeated Tupac Amaru, Jr. and Los Gringos VIP (Avisman and El Hijo del Diablo) | Best two-out-of-three falls six-man tag team match |
| 4 | Alan Extreme, Golden Magic and Veneno defeated Oficial AK-47, Canis Lups and El Hijo de Máscara Año 2000 | Best two-out-of-three falls six-man tag team match |
| 5 | Cien Caras, Jr., Super Nova and X-Fly defeated Lizmark, Jr., Vampiro Canadiense and Villano IV | Best two-out-of-three falls six-man tag team match |
D / – this was a dark match
