= IWRG 16th Anniversary Show =

2012 International Wrestling Revolution Group event

- The official poster for the event depicting 14 of the wrestlers on the show. Note the "XV" typo, should have been "XVI"
- Promotion: International Wrestling Revolution Group
- Date: January 1, 2012
- City: Naucalpan, State of Mexico
- Venue: Arena Naucalpan

Event chronology
← Previous; Guerra de Campeones	Next → El Protector

IWRG Anniversary Shows chronology
← Previous; 15th Anniversary	Next → 17th Anniversary

The IWRG 16th Anniversary Show was an annual professional wrestling major event produced by Mexican professional wrestling promotion International Wrestling Revolution Group (IWRG), which took place on January 1, 2012 in Arena Naucalpan, Naucalpan, State of Mexico, Mexico. The event commemorated the creation of IWRG on January 1, 1996 by promoter Adolfo Moreno. In the main event Multifacético (the fourth wrestler to use that name) defeated Apolo Estrada, Jr. in a Lucha de Apuesta, or bet match, where both wrestlers put their hair on the line and as a result Estrada Jr. was shaved bald after the match.

== Production ==
=== Background ===
The 2012 International Wrestling Revolution Group (IWRG; Sometimes referred to as Grupo Internacional Revolución in Spanish) anniversary show commemorated the 16th anniversary of IWRG's creation as a wrestling promotion and holding their first show on January 1, 1996. The Anniversary show, as well as the majority of the IWRG shows in general are held in "Arena Naucalpan", owned by the promoters of IWRG and their main arena. The Anniversary Shows generally take place on January 1 each year whenever possible.

=== Storylines ===
The event featured five professional wrestling matches with different wrestlers involved in pre-existing scripted feuds, plots and storylines. Wrestlers were portrayed as either heels (referred to as rudos in Mexico, those that portray the "bad guys") or faces (técnicos in Mexico, the "good guy" characters) as they followed a series of tension-building events, which culminated in a wrestling match or series of matches.

== Results ==
No.	Results	Stipulations
1	Astro Rey, Jr., Centvrión and Eragón defeated Los Gemelo Fantasticos (I and II) and Pacto Negro	Best two-out-of-three falls six-man tag team match
2	Alan Extreme, Carta Brava, Jr. and Imposible defeated Dinamic Black, Golden Magic and Saruman	Best two-out-of-three falls six-man tag team match
3	Los Oficiales (Oficial 911, Oficial AK-47 and Oficial Fierro) defeated Centvrión, Chico Che, Ultramán, Jr.	Best two-out-of-three falls six-man tag team match
4	Canis Lupus, Eterno and Máscara Año 2000, Jr. defeated Freyser, Jr., Mr. Magia and Ultramán Jr.	Best two-out-of-three falls six-man tag team match
5	Multifacético defeated Apolo Estrada, Jr.	Best two-out-of-three falls Lucha de Apuesta, hair vs. hair match
