= Sanada (wrestler) =

Japanese professional wrestler

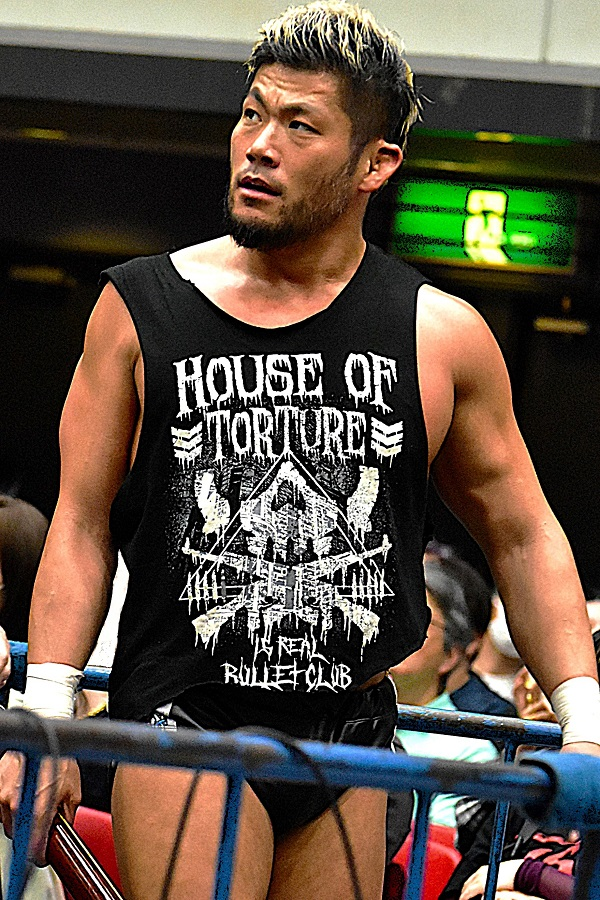
- Sanada in April 2025

Personal information
- Born: Seiya Sanada; January 28, 1988 (age 38) Niigata, Japan

Professional wrestling career
- Ring name(s): The Great Sanada; Kiyonari Sanada; Seiya Sanada; Sanada
- Billed height: 1.82 m (5 ft 11 1/2 in)
- Billed weight: 100 kg (220 lb)
- Trained by: Taiyō Kea; Kaz Hayashi; Keiji Muto; Osamu Nishimura; Satoshi Kojima; Kohei Suwama
- Debut: March 13, 2007

Seiya Sanada (真田 聖也, Sanada Seiya; born January 28, 1988), better known by his mononymous ring name Sanada (stylized in all caps), is a Japanese professional wrestler. He is signed to New Japan Pro-Wrestling (NJPW), where he is a member of House of Torture.

As part of NJPW, Sanada is mostly known for his tag team with Evil as a part of Los Ingobernables de Japón, with whom he is a two-time IWGP Tag Team Champion, two-time World Tag League winner, and a three-time NEVER Openweight 6-Man Tag Team Champion (alongside Bushi). He also had a short reign as IWGP Tag Team Champion with Tetsuya Naito. He won his first NJPW singles title, the IWGP United States Heavyweight Championship, in early 2022, and won the 2023 New Japan Cup, which led to him winning the IWGP Heavyweight Championship. During his New Japan Cup run, Sanada joined Just 5 Guys, and remained with the stable until late 2024, when he betrayed them to align with Bullet Club's War Dogs sub-group. However, this would be short-lived, as he would turn on them in early 2025 to join House of Torture.

He is also known for his work in All Japan Pro Wrestling (AJPW), where he was the first Gaora TV Champion, a two-time All Asia Tag Team Champion, a one-time World Tag Team Champion, and the winner of the 2011 World's Strongest Tag Determination League tournament. Sanada is also known for his time in the Japanese Wrestle-1 (W-1) and American Total Nonstop Action Wrestling (TNA) promotions. Through the W-1/TNA working relationship, Sanada became a one time TNA X Division Champion, winning the title at the collaborative Kaisen: Outbreak.

== Professional wrestling career ==
=== Early career ===
In 2005, Sanada tried to earn a training spot in the New Japan Pro-Wrestling (NJPW) dojo, but failed to pass an introductory test. Sanada took the test alongside future NJPW wrestlers Tetsuya Naito and Yoshi-Hashi. Afterwards, Sanada began looking to other promotions for a training school.

=== All Japan Pro Wrestling (2007–2013) ===
Sanada was eventually trained by Keiji Muto's All Japan Pro Wrestling (AJPW) affiliated Mutohjuku school and turned pro on March 13, 2007, in a losing effort teaming with Ryuji Hijikata against Katsuhiko Nakajima and T28. Within a few months into his career, Sanada won his first honor when he teamed with Kensuke Sasaki and Nakajima to win the Samurai! TV Triple Arrow Tournament on May 29, 2007. Following the tournament victory, Sanada spent the next two years in opening match wrestling other up-and-comers and began teaming with Manabu Soya. By 2009, Sanada began moving up the card as he took part in his first Champion Carnival but finished last with no points. Later in the year, Sanada broke up with Soya and briefly teamed up with Osamu Nishimura with the two entering the 2009 World's Strongest Tag Determination League with Sanada even getting a pinfall victory over the tag team champions: Taiyō Kea and Minoru Suzuki but the team's run ended when Sanada suffered the flu and had to withdraw from the tournament.

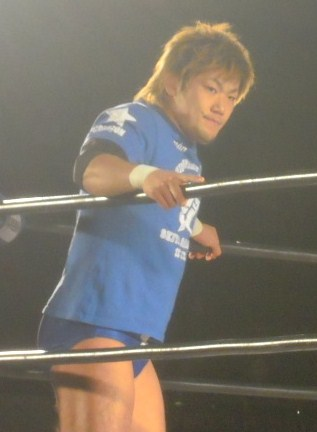
Sanada in 2011

In 2010, Sanada once again entered the Champion Carnival but the results were the same as he finished last in his block with no points. By the spring, Sanada helped form the New Generation Force stable with Suwama, Masayuki Kono, Ryota Hama, and Manabu Soya. On August 29, 2010, at Pro Wrestling Love in Ryogoku Vol. 10, Sanada and Soya defeated Taru and Big Daddy Voodoo to win the All Asia Tag Team Championship. Sanada and Soya entered the 2010 World's Strongest Tag Determination League in the fall where they finished in 6th place with 7 points. Sanada and Soya would lose the All Asia Tag Team Championship to Daisuke Sekimoto and Yuji Okabayashi on March 21, 2011. During the year 2011, Sanada reached his full potential by reaching the final against Yuji Nagata, but loss to him in the final. He also entered in 2011 World's Strongest Tag Determination League with Kai and won the tournament by defeating Masayuki Kono and Masakatsu Funaki in the final. They then challenged the All Japan World Tag Team Champions Dark Cuervo and Dark Ozz for a title shot but came up short. They then faced each other in a singles match, which led to Sanada winning that match. After the match they both had an interview and Sanada decided that they should part ways and move on with their Tag Team which Kai also agreed on. In 2012 he then challenged All Japan ace Suwama to a 60-minute match but also fell short in that match. He then challenged his former trainer Satoshi Kojima to match but also fell short after a Lariat by Kojima, during the Match he sustained a right knee injury but still wrestled and took a little time off to heal his knee. He then participated in 2012's Champion Carnival and lost to his former tag partner Manabu Soya. But he then won his first match against Soya's brother Takumi Soya and debuted a new finisher called "This Is It". On May 20, 2012, Sanada and Joe Doering defeated Soya and Takao Omori to win the World Tag Team Championship. Sanada and Doering lost the title back to Soya and Ōmori on June 17. On October 7, 2012, Sanada defeated Yasufumi Nakanoue in a tournament final to become the inaugural Gaora TV Champion. After reaching the semifinals of the 2013 Champion Carnival, All Japan announced on May 1, 2013, that Sanada would be leaving on a learning excursion to Moncton, Canada, where he would train under Emile Duprée. During the excursion, Sanada lost the Gaora TV Championship to René Duprée on May 27.

=== Wrestle-1 (2013–2015) ===
On July 1, while still in Canada, Sanada announced his resignation from All Japan, taking part in a mass exodus caused by Nobuo Shiraishi becoming the promotion's new president. Following his resignation, Sanada traveled to Mexico on his own expense to continue his training. Though Sanada was not announced as part of Keiji Muto's splinter promotion Wrestle-1, he did make a surprise appearance at the promotion's inaugural event on September 8, losing to Kai in a singles match. Sanada and Kai had a rematch in the main event of Wrestle-1's second show on September 15; this time Sanada was victorious. On September 24, Wrestle-1 announced that Sanada had signed a contract with the promotion. Sanada wrestled his first match under a Wrestle-1 contract on October 6, losing to Kai in the main event of the promotion's first event in Korakuen Hall. As a result, Kai won the series between him and Sanada 3–2. On November 16, Sanada unsuccessfully challenged visiting American wrestler A.J. Styles for the TNA World Heavyweight Championship.

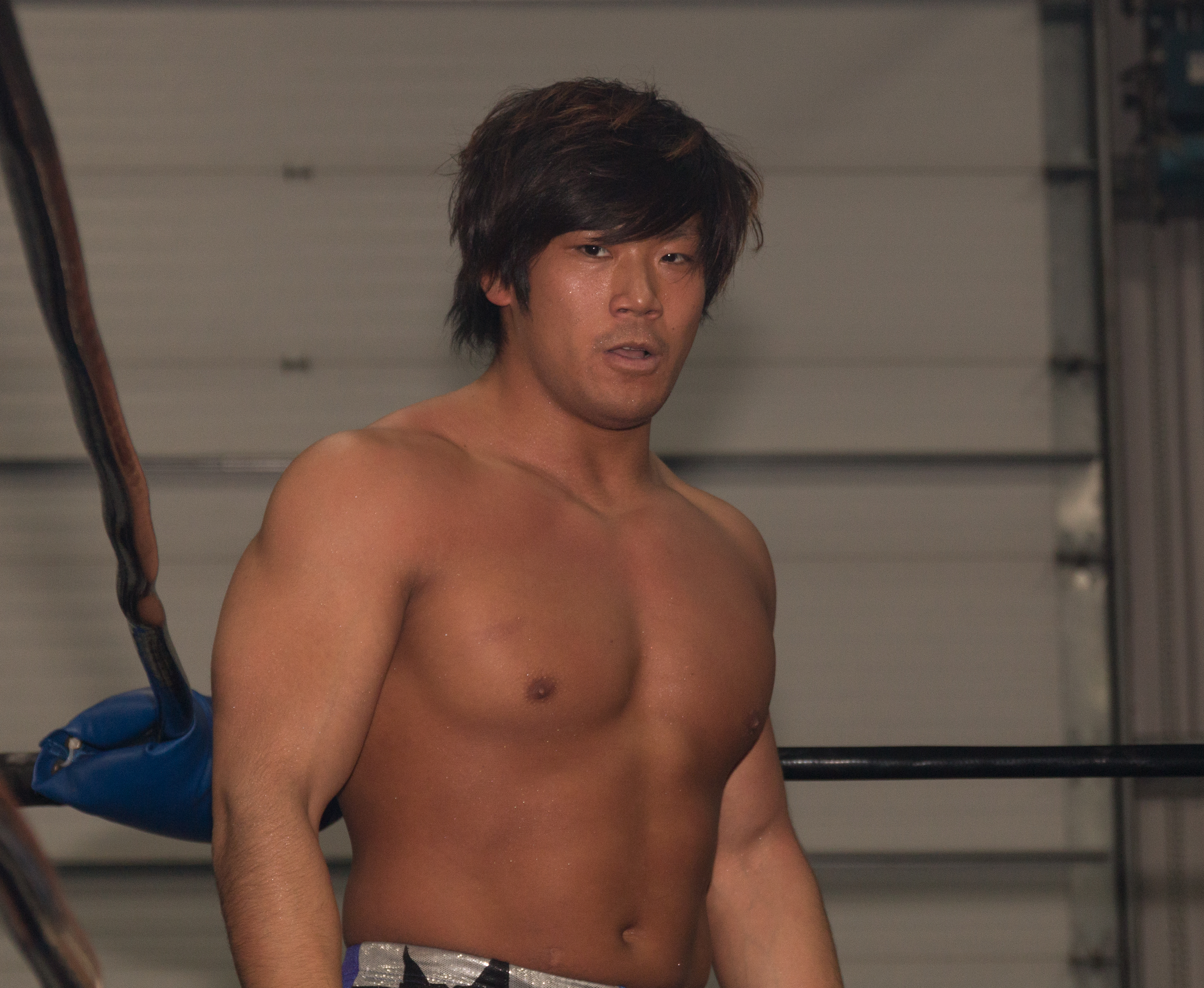
Sanada in January 2015

In early 2014, Sanada was offered an opportunity to earn another shot at the TNA World Heavyweight Championship, but he instead opted to go for the TNA X Division Championship. On February 15, Sanada defeated nineteen other men in a battle royal to become the number one contender to the title. On March 2 at Kaisen: Outbreak, Sanada defeated Austin Aries to become the new TNA X Division Champion. The following day, Wrestle-1 announced Sanada would be leaving Japan to work for TNA indefinitely. Sanada continued making sporadic appearances for Wrestle-1, defending his X Division Championship against Seiki Yoshioka on March 22 and against Christopher Daniels on April 17, while also losing to The Great Muta in the main event of Wrestle-1's second Ryōgoku Kokugikan event, Shōgeki: Impact, on July 6. The following day, Wrestle-1 and Sanada held a press conference to announce that he had signed a contract with TNA, giving him a dual contract between Wrestle-1 and the American promotion.

Sanada returned to working for Wrestle-1 full-time in October 2014, when TNA went inactive for the rest of the year. The following month, Sanada teamed up with Hiroshi Yamato for the First Tag League Greatest tournament, set to determine the inaugural Wrestle-1 Tag Team Champions. The team finished their block with a record of one win, two draws and one loss, narrowly missing advancement to the semifinals. On December 22, Sanada unsuccessfully challenged Muto for the Wrestle-1 Championship. On May 13, 2015, Sanada held a press conference in Japan, where he announced that he was leaving Wrestle-1 once his contract expired two days later, so he could continue working in the United States full-time as a freelancer.

=== Total Nonstop Action Wrestling (2014–2015) ===
Sanada made his TNA debut on March 9 at Lockdown, where he, working under just his family name, teamed with The Great Muta and Yasu to defeat Chris Sabin and Bad Influence (Christopher Daniels and Kazarian) in a six-man tag team steel cage match. Four days later, Sanada made his Impact Wrestling debut, teaming with Tigre Uno to defeat TNA World Tag Team Champions The BroMans (Jessie Godderz and Robbie E), in a non-title match. As a result, the two received a shot at the TNA World Tag Team Championship the following week, but were defeated in a three-way match, which also included The Wolves (Davey Richards and Eddie Edwards). Sanada and Tigre Uno were then put against each other in a "best of three" match series for the TNA X Division Championship. On April 27 at Sacrifice, Sanada defeated Uno to win the series 2–1 and retain the X Division Championship. On June 15 at Slammiversary XII, Sanada defeated Crazzy Steve, Davey Richards, Eddie Edwards, Manik and Tigre Uno in a six-way ladder match to retain the X Division Championship. On the July 10 episode of Impact Wrestling, Sanada lost the X Division Championship back to Austin Aries.

On the July 24 Impact Wrestling, Sanada took part in an angle, where he turned on his mentor The Great Muta, hitting him with a steel chair and a moonsault, after initially saving him from James Storm. The following week at Destination X, Storm introduced Sanada as his new protégé, before he defeated Brian Cage and Crazzy Steve to advance to the final of a tournament for the vacant X Division Championship. On the August 7 Impact Wrestling, Sanada was defeated by Samoa Joe in the final of the tournament, which also included Low Ki. After signing a one-year contract with TNA, Sanada debuted the new ring name "The Great Sanada" and a look inspired by The Great Muta on the August 27 Impact Wrestling, defeating Austin Aries with help from Storm. Sanada and Storm were eventually joined by Abyss and Manik to form a stable named The Revolution. On October 12, Sanada main evented TNA's Bound for Glory event in Tokyo, teaming with Storm in a tag team match, where they were defeated by The Great Muta and Tajiri. On the April 10, 2015 Impact Wrestling, Storm dismissed Sanada from The Revolution, stating that Sanada had let him down one too many times. Sanada's departure from TNA was officially confirmed by the promotion on April 16.

=== Independent circuit (2014–2016) ===
On September 20, 2014, Sanada, using his villainous Great Sanada persona, made his debut for American independent promotion Chikara, entering the annual Rey de Voladores tournament. After defeating Amasis, AR Fox and Orlando Christopher in his opening four-way elimination match, Sanada was defeated in the final of the tournament the following day by Shynron. After leaving TNA in April 2015, Sanada began working more regularly on the American independent circuit. On May 6, Global Force Wrestling (GFW) announced Sanada as part of their roster. He made his debut for the promotion on July 11, teaming with Takaaki Watanabe in a tag team match, where they were defeated by Bullet Club (Doc Gallows and Karl Anderson). Though now living in the United States, in July Sanada flew back to Japan to take part in a WWE tryout held by William Regal. In August 2016, Sanada teamed with Minoru Fujita and Mazada to defeat the team of Harashima, Kotaro Suzuki and Masato Tanaka at a Tokyo Gurentai event.

=== New Japan Pro-Wrestling (2016–present) ===
==== Los Ingobernables de Japón (2016–2023) ====
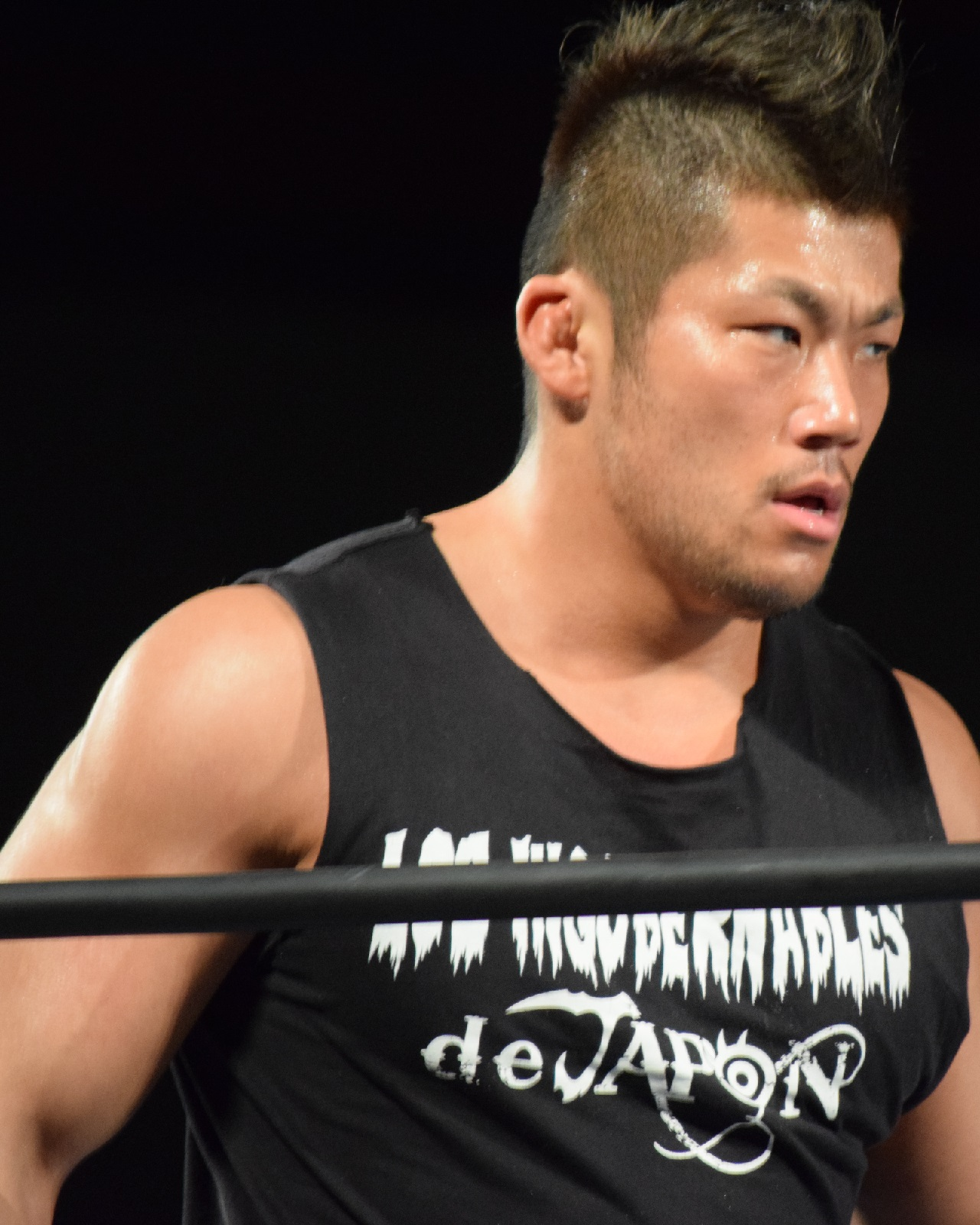
Sanada in May 2016, shortly after joining Los Ingobernables de Japón

On April 10, 2016, Sanada, sporting a new look including a mohawk, made a surprise debut for NJPW at Invasion Attack 2016 by interfering in the main event and helping Tetsuya Naito defeat Kazuchika Okada for the IWGP Heavyweight Championship, joining Naito's Los Ingobernables de Japón (L.I.J.) stable in the process. The following day, NJPW announced Sanada's new ring name; SANADA, his family name stylized in all capital letters. Though he started working for NJPW full-time, Sanada remained a freelancer. Sanada wrestled his first NJPW match on April 17, when he and his L.I.J. stablemates Naito, Bushi and Evil defeated Gedo, Hirooki Goto, Okada and Tomohiro Ishii, with him submitting Gedo for the win. Sanada's first big match in NJPW took place on May 3 at Wrestling Dontaku 2016, where he was defeated by Okada. On July 18, Sanada entered the 2016 G1 Climax, opening his tournament by scoring a major win over Hiroshi Tanahashi. He finished the tournament on August 12 with a record of four wins and five losses. At the end of the year, Sanada took part in the 2016 World Tag League, teaming with stablemate Evil. The two finished second in their block with a record of five wins and two losses, tied with block winners Togi Makabe and Tomoaki Honma, but failed to advance to the final due to losing the head-to-head match against Makabe and Honma.

On January 4, 2017, at Wrestle Kingdom 11, Sanada, Bushi and Evil won a four-team gauntlet match to become the new NEVER Openweight 6-Man Tag Team Champions. They lost the title to Tanahashi, Manabu Nakanishi and Ryusuke Taguchi the next day, before regaining it on February 11 at The New Beginning in Osaka. They lost the title to Tanahashi, Taguchi and Ricochet in their second defense on April 4, before regaining it on May 3 at Wrestling Dontaku 2017. During the summer, Sanada took part in the 2017 G1 Climax, where he finished with a record of four wins and five losses. In December, Sanada and Evil won their block in the 2017 World Tag League with a record of five wins and two losses, advancing to the final of the tournament. On December 11, they defeated Guerrillas of Destiny (Tama Tonga and Tanga Loa) in the final to win the tournament. Six days later, Sanada, Bushi and Evil lost the NEVER Openweight 6-Man Tag Team Championship to Guerrillas of Destiny and Bad Luck Fale in their fourth defense.

On January 4, 2018, at Wrestle Kingdom 12, Evil and Sanada defeated the Killer Elite Squad (Davey Boy Smith Jr. and Lance Archer) to win the IWGP Tag Team Championship for the first time. The following day at New Year Dash!! in a post-show interview, Sanada challenged Okada to an IWGP Heavyweight Championship match at The New Beginning in Osaka. At the event, he lost to Okada. In April at Wrestling Hinokuni 2018, Evil and Sanada defeated Killer Elite Squad for their second successful defense. At Dominion 6.9 in Osaka-jo Hall, Evil and Sanada lost the IWGP Tag Team Championship to the Young Bucks. The rematch was set on July 7, at G1 Special in San Francisco, but they were unsuccessful in regaining the title. During the summer, Sanada took part in the 2018 G1 Climax, where he finished with a record of four wins and five losses, failing to advance from his block. He also got a huge win against Kota Ibushi in the tournament. In December, Evil and Sanada took part in 2018 World Tag League. Team first qualified to the final and then defeated Guerrillas of Destiny to win the tournament. On January 4, 2019, at Wrestle Kingdom 13, Evil and Sanada defeated both Guerrillas of Destiny and Young Bucks to win the IWGP Tag Team Championship for the second time. The following day at New Year Dash!!, Suzuki-gun attacked Los Ingobernables de Japón. Minoru Suzuki and Zack Sabre Jr. challenged Evil and Sanada for the IWGP Tag Team Championship. At The New Beginning in Sapporo, they retained their titles. At Honor Rising: Japan 2019, Evil and Sanada lost the titles in their second defense against Guerillas of Destiny.

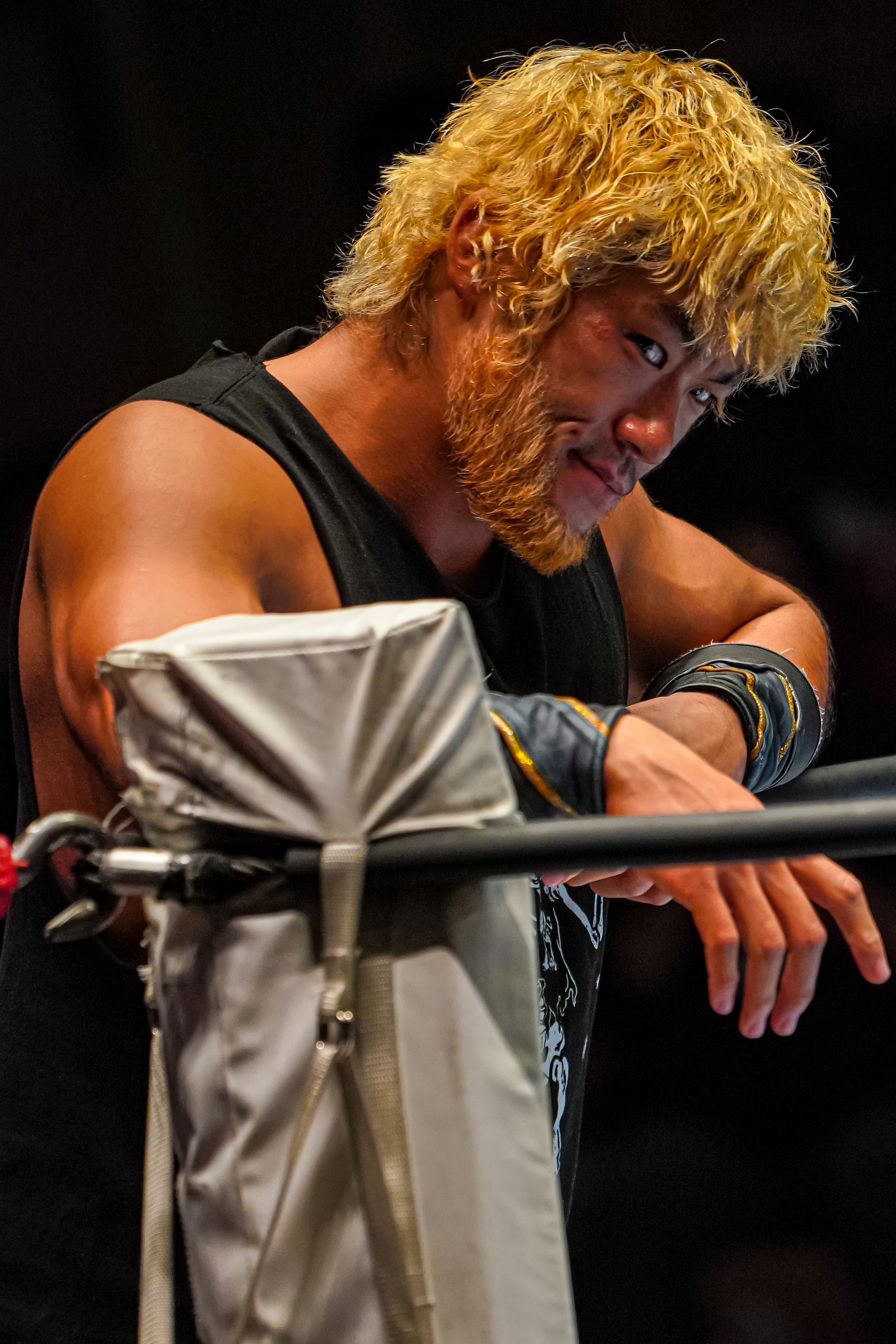
Sanada in October 2019

Sanada was announced to take part in 2019 New Japan Cup and faced Hirooki Goto in the first round. After defeating Goto, Sanada went on to defeat Minoru Suzuki, Colt Cabana and then Hiroshi Tanahashi to make it to the final. Sanada lost in the final against Kazuchika Okada. On March 28, Dave Meltzer rated this match 5 stars, which was the first match that Sanada got this rating. On May 4, the second night of Wrestling Dontaku 2019, Sanada unsuccessfully challenged Okada for the IWGP Heavyweight Championship. Sanada entered the G1 Climax, where he finished with a record of 4 wins and 5 losses, ending the tournament with 8 points. One of Sanada's wins in the tournament came against Okada, who was still IWGP Heavyweight Champion at the time. It was after Royal Quest, where Okada successfully defended the championship against Suzuki, when Sanada once again challenged Okada for the Championship. However, at King of Pro-Wrestling, Sanada lost to Okada. On the second night of Wrestle Kingdom 14, Sanada challenged Sabre for the British Heavyweight Championship, but was unsuccessful. The following night at New Years Dash!!, Sanada teamed with Naito to defeat Bullet Club's Jay White and Kenta. White would then go on to challenge Sanada to a special singles match at The New Beginning in Osaka, where White would defeat Sanada. Sanada was then announced to be participating in the New Japan Cup, facing Mikey Nicholls in the first round. However, due to the COVID-19 pandemic, all New Japan Cup and further events were cancelled. Following NJPW's return to producing shows, Sanada entered the rescheduled New Japan Cup. He defeated Ryusuke Taguchi, Sho, and Taichi, before losing to Evil in the semi-finals. Following Evil's betrayal and departure from L.I.J. after winning the New Japan Cup, it was announced that the NEVER 6-Man titles would be vacated and that new champions would be crowned in a tournament. Sanada would occupy Evil's previous spot and team with Bushi and Shingo Takagi in the tournament, defeating Suzuki-gun in the first round but then losing to Chaos in the semi-finals.

Sanada would then enter the inaugural KOPW 2020 tournament, defeating Sho once again in a submission match, but failed to capture the trophy in a fatal four way against El Desperado, Toru Yano and Okada at Jingu Stadium. Sanada then participated in the G1 Climax 30 where he would lose his first three matches, but then go on to win six in a row (including matches against stablemate and IWGP double champion Naito, and former partner Evil) to win his first ever G1 Climax block, before losing to Kota Ibushi in the longest G1 Climax final match in history. At Wrestle Kingdom 15, Sanada defeated Evil. On February 11 at The New Beginning in Hiroshima, he unsuccessfully challenged Ibushi for the IWGP Heavyweight and Intercontinental Championships. He then went on to compete in the New Japan Cup, where he defeated Tomohiro Ishii In the first round and defeated Yuji Nagata in the second round before being eliminated by Will Ospreay in the quarter final. On July 11 at night two of Summer Struggle in Sapporo, Sanada and Naito defeated Dangerous Tekkers (Taichi and Zack Sabre Jr.) to win the IWGP Tag Team Championship for the first time as a team. They would lose the championship at Wrestle Grand Slam in Tokyo Dome, ending their reign at just 14 days.

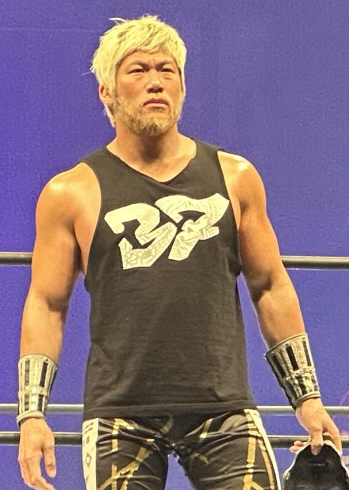
Sanada in February 2023

At New Years Golden Series on February 19, Sanada would beat Tanahashi for the IWGP United States Heavyweight Championship, marking his first singles championship victory in New Japan Pro-Wrestling since his debut in April 2016. Sanada would compete in that years New Japan Cup, where he received a bye to the second round. He defeated Aaron Henare in the second round, but lost to Ospreay in the third round. The match ended in a referee stoppage. Later, it was revealed Sanada had suffered a fractured orbital bone. Sanada vacated the championship at Hyper Battle, ending his reign at 49 days. Sanada returned from injury on June 12 at Dominion 6.12 in Osaka-jo Hall, where he faced Ospreay for the vacant US title, as former champion Juice Robinson was forced to vacate due to suffering from appendicitis. At the event, Ospreay once again defeated Sanada. Also at the event, Sanada was announced to be a part of the G1 Climax 32 tournament in July, where he would compete in the B Block. He finished with 6 points, failing to advance to the semi-finals. In October, Sanada competed in a tournament to crown the first NJPW World Television Champion, defeating Taichi in the opening round. Sanada then defeated Kenta in the following round. In the semi-final round, Sanada lost to Ren Narita, ending his tournament campaign. The following month, Sanada teamed with Naito in the World Tag League, however, the group failed to reach the finals, after ending the tournament with 12 points. At Wrestle Kingdom 17, Sanada teamed with Naito and Bushi, losing to Tanahashi, Shota Umino and Keiji Muto, in a six-man tag team match, which was Muto's NJPW retirement match. On Night 2 on January 21, Sanada lost to former tag team partner Manabu Soya, in a series of matches between Los Ingobernables de Japón and the Kongo stable.

==== Just 5 Guys and IWGP World Heavyweight Champion (2023–2024) ====
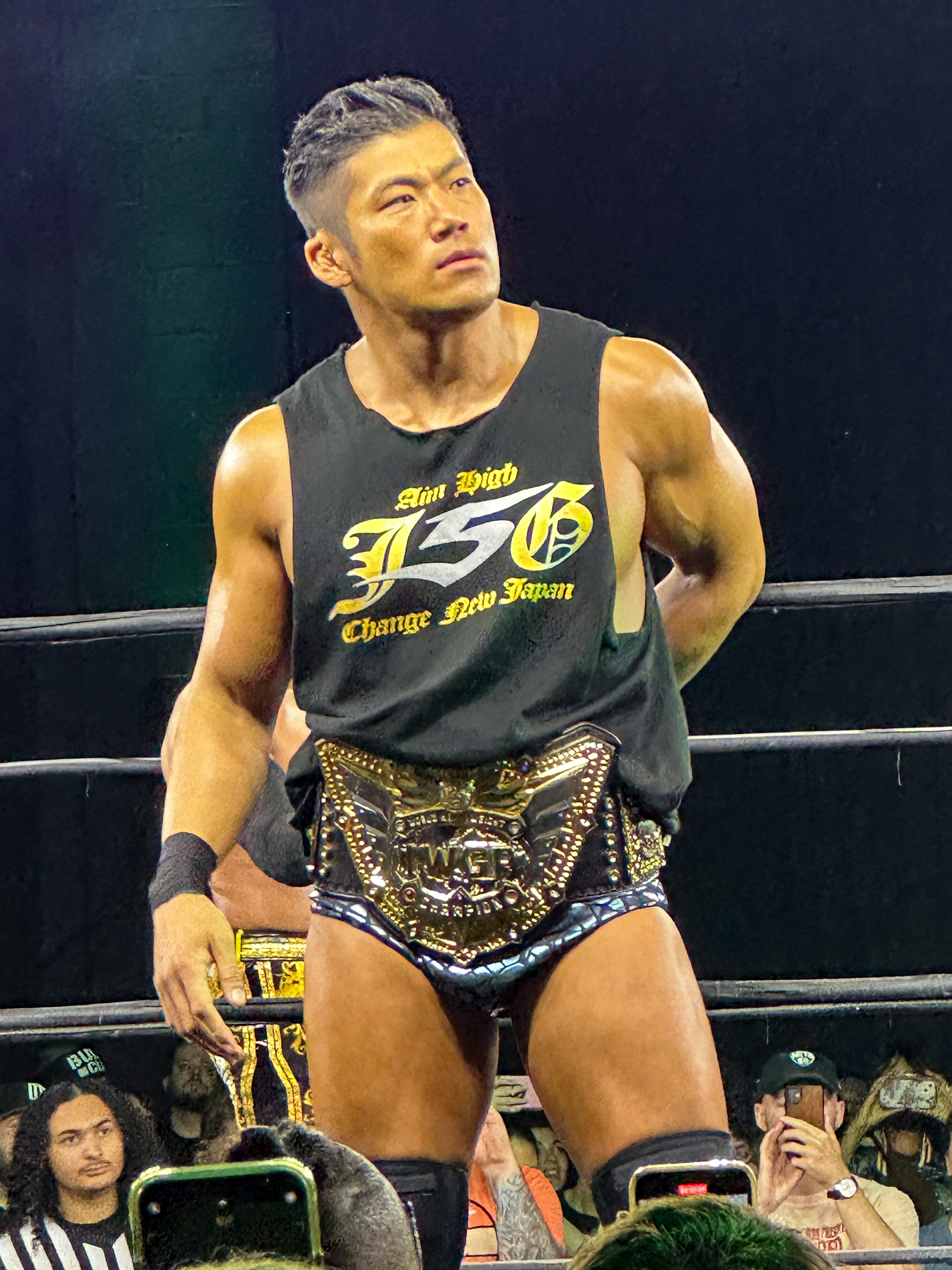
Sanada as IWGP World Heavyweight Champion in April 2023

In March, Sanada entered the New Japan Cup, defeating Taichi and Kenta in the first two rounds. In the quarterfinal round, Sanada defeated Los Ingobernables de Japón stablemate and leader, Tetsuya Naito. After the match, Sanada was joined in the ring by Taichi, Yoshinobu Kanemaru, Taka Michinoku and Douki, where they all shook hands. This led to L.I.J. members, Hiromu Takahashi, Bushi and Shingo Takagi coming to ringside. Sanada then stated that he could not achieve further success in L.I.J., Michinoku and Taichi, then confirmed Sanada was the newest member of the Just 4 Guys stable, thus making it Just 5 Guys. Sanada then told the LIJ members to leave, confirming his departure from the stable. In the semi-final round, Sanada, now sporting jet-black, shorter hair and a clean shave, defeated Mark Davis. In the tournament final, Sanada defeated David Finlay, winning the New Japan Cup, his first singles tournament, and setting himself up to face Kazuchika Okada for the IWGP World Heavyweight Championship at Sakura Genesis. On April 8 at the event, Sanada defeated Okada for the title, winning his first World Championship in his career.

Following his title win, Sanada was confronted by his former L.I.J. stablemate Hiromu Takahashi, who challenged him for the World Championship. Sanada accepted on the basis that Kanemaru would be able to challenge for Takahashi's IWGP Junior Heavyweight Championship, which Takahashi similarly accepted. Following Takahashi retaining the title against Kanemaru, he faced Sanada at Wrestling Dontaku, where Sanada retained the World title. Following the match, Sanada and the remainder of Just 5 Guys were attacked by the returning Yota Tsuji, who challenged Sanada for his title. The title match was made official for Dominion. On June 3 at the press conference the day before the event, Tsuji officially joined L.I.J. The day after at the event, Sanada retained his title against Tsuji. On June 25, Sanada made his third title defence on June 25 at Forbidden Door, defeating "Jungle Boy" Jack Perry. The following month, Sanada entered the annual G1 Climax tournament, participating in the A Block. Sanada finished the tournament with a perfect record, defeating all A Block participants to finish with 14 points, being the only man in the tournament to do so and thus finishing top of the block and advancing to the quarterfinal round. In the quarterfinal round, Sanada was defeated by former tag-team partner Evil, thus eliminating him from the tournament.

The loss to Evil caused Sanada to defend the World Championship against the latter, with the title match being scheduled as a Lumberjack match for Destruction in Ryōgoku on October 9. On September 24 at Destruction in Kobe, Kanemaru betrayed Just 5 Guys, joining Evil's House of Torture stable, reverting Just 5 Guys back to Just 4 Guys. On October 9, Just 4 Guys reverted to Just 5 Guys, when Yuya Uemura returned from excursion and joined the stable. In the show's main event, Sanada defeated Evil to retain the IWGP World Heavyweight Championship, in his fourth successful defence. Following the victory, Naito, the G1 Climax winner and former stablemate, confronted Sanada about their upcoming title match at Wrestle Kingdom 18. On January 4, 2024, at Wrestle Kingdom 18, Sanada was defeated in the main event by Naito, ending his record reign at 271 days. On February 24 at night two of The New Beginning in Sapporo, Sanada unsuccessfully attempted to regain the championship from Naito.

==== Bullet Club War Dogs and House of Torture (2024–present) ====
On November 4 at Power Struggle, Sanada betrayed Taichi and assisted Bullet Club leader David Finlay retain his IWGP Global Heavyweight Championship, joining Bullet Club and its War Dogs sub-group in the process. After joining the War Dogs, Sanada debuted a new look of blonde hair and beard, similar to his days in LIJ and adopted the moniker of "Cold Blooded". For the 2024 World Tag League, Sanada teamed with fellow War Dogs member Gabe Kidd, where they were placed in A-Block. The duo finished at the top of their block and advanced to the grand finals, where they lost to Tetsuya Naito and Hiromu Takahashi.

On February 11, 2025, at The New Beginning in Osaka, Sanada defeated Taichi. On the third day of the New Japan Cup, Sanada came out during Finlay and Evil's match and, seemingly inadvertently, hitting Finlay and Gedo, leading to tension throughout the tour and leaving his status with the War Dogs in question. On April 4 at Sakura Genesis, Sanada betrayed the War Dogs and joined House of Torture, thus realigning with former tag team partner Evil. After joining House of Torture, Sanada tweaked his moniker to "Cold Blooded Snake". In a post-match interview, Finlay, alongside the War Dogs (Kidd, Drilla Moloney, Clark Connors and Taiji Ishimori) challenged House of Torture (Evil, Ren Narita, Sho, Yoshinobu Kanemaru and Sanada) to a Dog Pound match, with the stipulation that the losers must leave Bullet Club. On May 3 at night one of Wrestling Dontaku, the War Dogs defeated House of Torture, thus HoT were forced to leave Bullet Club. From July to August, Sanada competed in the G1 Climax, where he was placed in A-Block and finished the tournament with 8 points, failing to advance to the semi-finals.

On January 6, 2026, NJPW announced that Sanada would be taking an indefinite leave of absence from in-ring competition for undisclosed reasons. Sanada returned on Night 2 of Wrestling Dontaku on 4 May, attacking the reigning NJPW World Television Champion Konosuke Takeshita. NJPW would later confirm that the leave of absence was taken as he had suffered from thoracic outlet syndrome since Wrestle Kingdom 18. On June 14 at Dominion 6.14 in Osaka-jo Hall, Sanada failed to win the World Television title from Takeshita.

== Championships and accomplishments ==
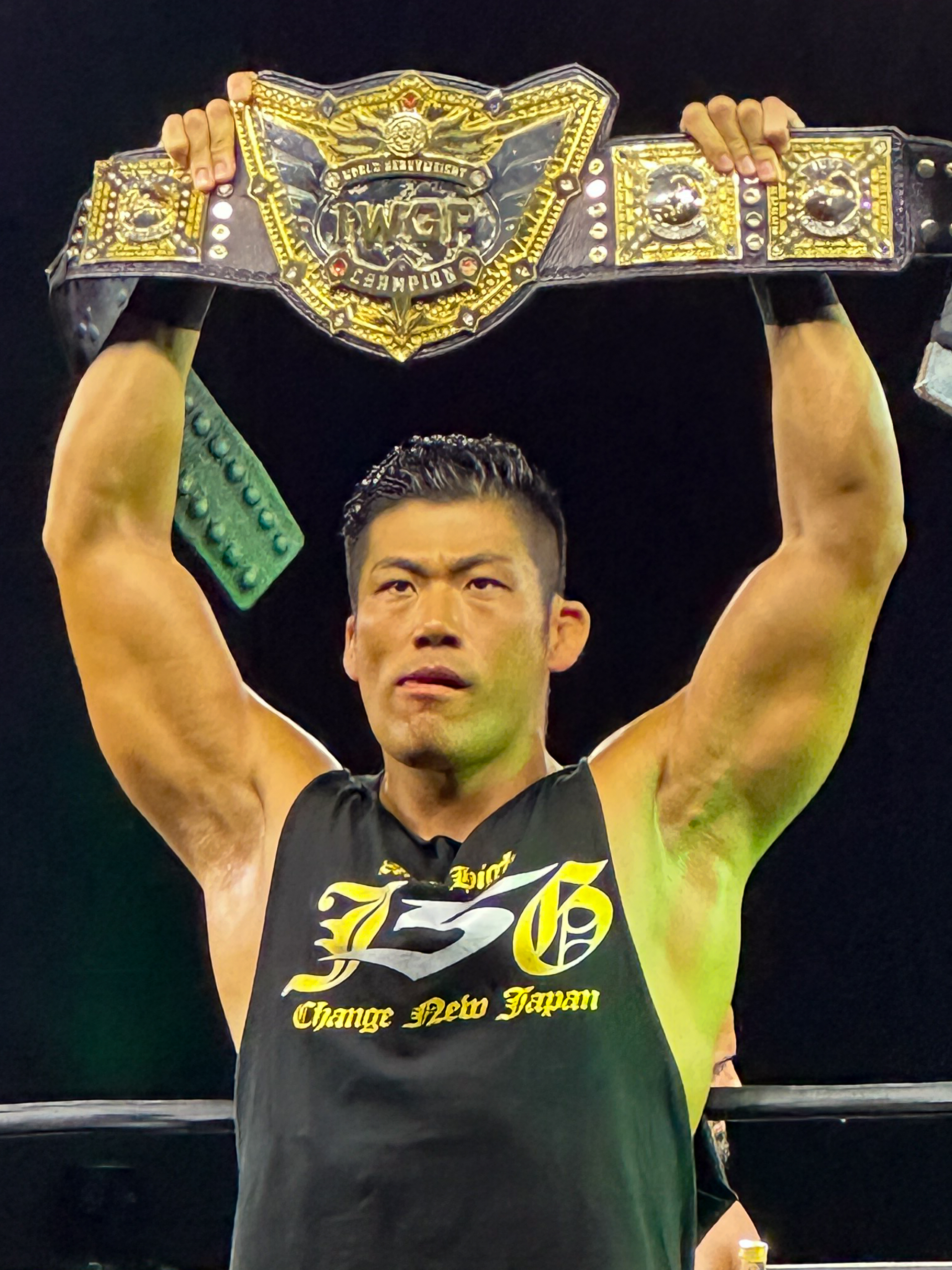
Sanada is a one-time IWGP Heavyweight Champion...

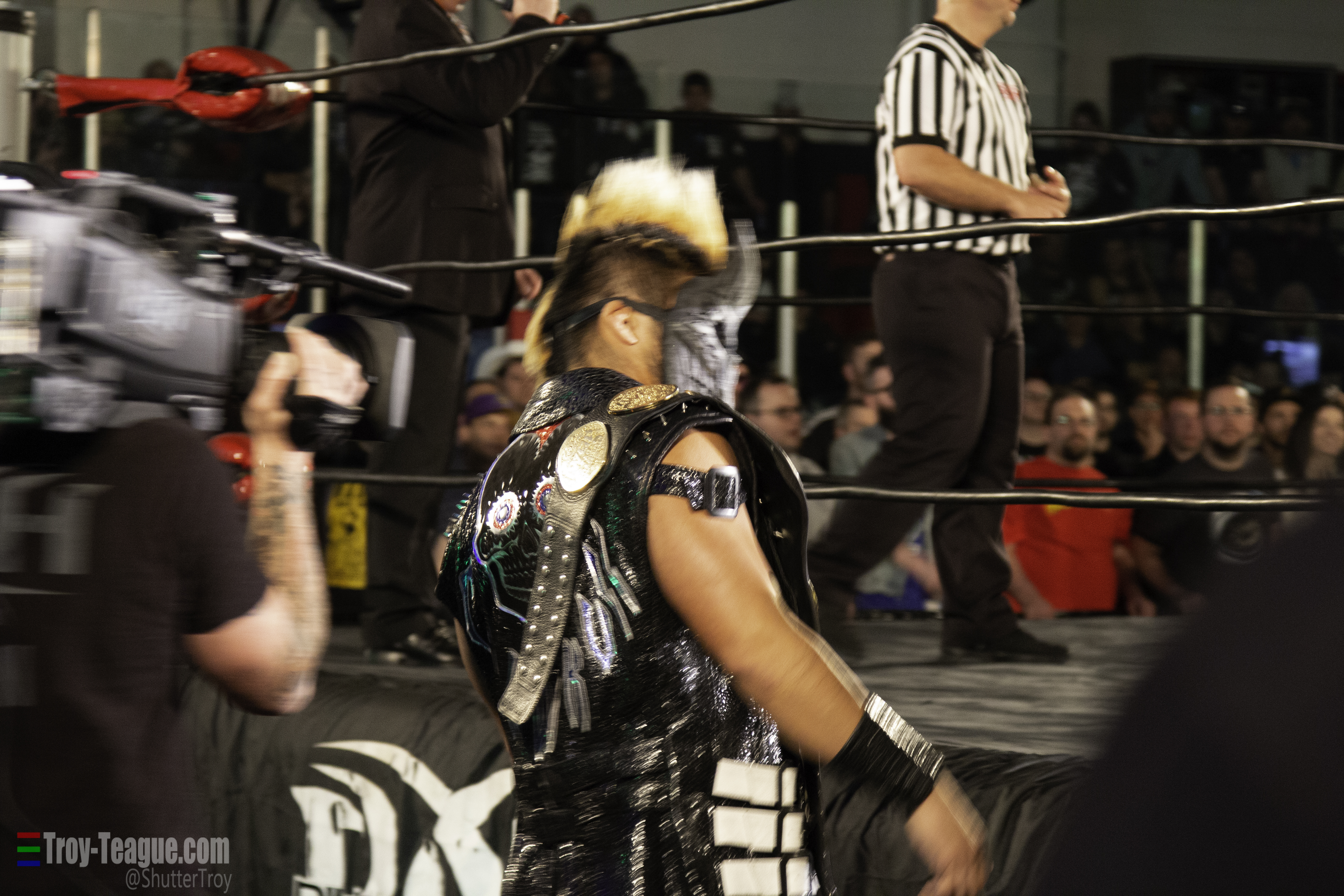
As well as a three-time IWGP Tag Team Champion...

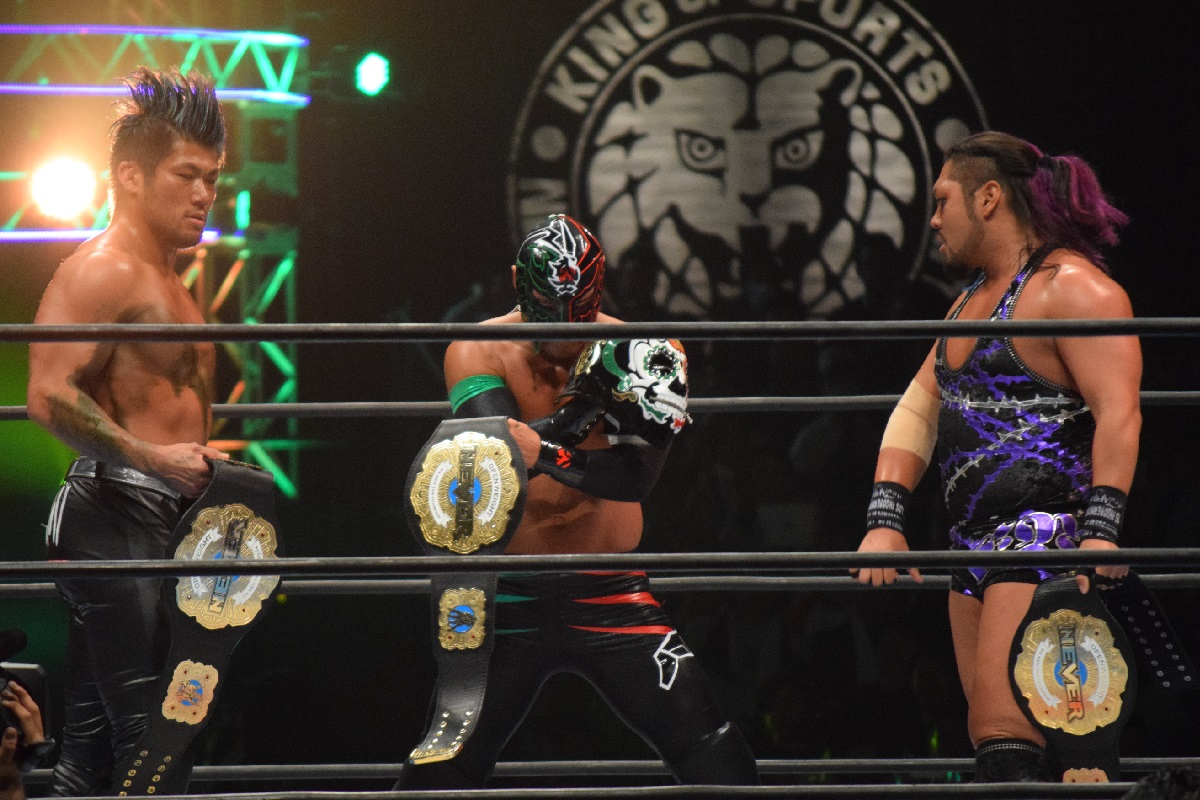
...and a three-time NEVER Openweight 6-Man Tag Team Champion, as he was here with Bushi and Evil in February 2017.

- All Japan Pro Wrestling
  - All Asia Tag Team Championship (2 times) – with Manabu Soya
  - Gaora TV Championship (1 time)
  - World Tag Team Championship (1 time) – with Joe Doering
  - Gaora TV Championship Tournament (2012)
  - Samurai! TV Cup Triple Arrow Tournament (2007) – with Kensuke Sasaki and Katsuhiko Nakajima
  - World's Strongest Tag Determination League (2011) – with Kai
- New Japan Pro-Wrestling
  - IWGP Heavyweight Championship (1 time) (Note: During Sanada's reign, the title was called the IWGP World Heavyweight Championship.)
  - IWGP Intercontinental Championship (1 time) (Note: With the reactivation of the IWGP Heavyweight Championship and the restored and combined histories of both it, the World Heavyweight, and the Intercontinental titles, all former IWGP World Heavyweight Champions are retroactively recognized as having been an IWGP Intercontinental Champion.)
  - IWGP United States Heavyweight Championship (1 time)
  - IWGP Tag Team Championship (3 times) – with Evil (2) and Tetsuya Naito (1)
  - NEVER Openweight 6-Man Tag Team Championship (3 times) – with Bushi and Evil
  - New Japan Cup (2023)
  - World Tag League (2017, 2018) – with Evil
- Pro Wrestling Illustrated
  - Ranked No. 11 of the top 500 singles wrestlers in the PWI 500 in 2023
- Total Nonstop Action Wrestling
  - TNA X Division Championship (1 time)
  - Global Impact Tournament (2015) – with Team International (Angelina Love, Bram, Drew Galloway, The Great Muta, Khoya, Magnus, Rockstar Spud, Sonjay Dutt and Tigre Uno)
- Tokyo Sports
  - Best Bout Award (2019) vs. Kazuchika Okada (October 14 at King of Pro-Wrestling)
- Wrestling Observer Newsletter
  - Best Gimmick (2017) as part of Los Ingobernables de Japón
  - Most Overrated (2023)

== Personal life ==
On June 26, 2026, he announced his marriage to former SKE48 member Mizuki Kuwabara.
